= Synchronized swimming at the 1996 Summer Olympics =

Synchronized swimming at the Games of the XXVI Olympiad
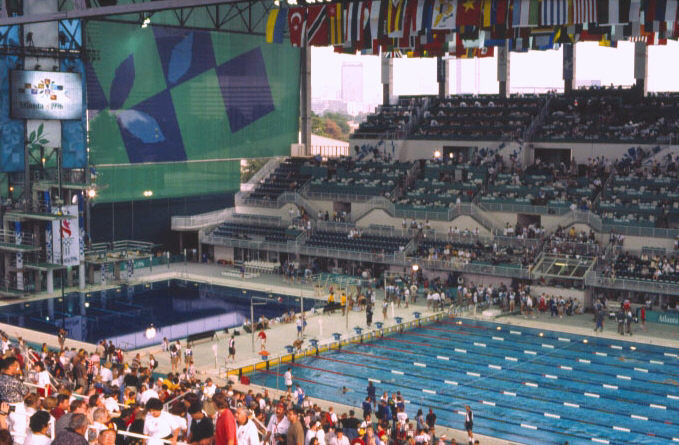
- Georgia Tech Aquatic Center
- Venue: Georgia Tech Aquatic Center
- Dates: 30 July – 2 August 1996
- Competitors: 78 from 8 nations
- Winning points: 99.720

Medalists
1st place, gold medalist(s)		United States; Suzannah Bianco, Tammy Cleland, Becky Dyroen-Lancer, Heather Pease, Jill Savery, Nathalie Schneyder, Heather Simmons-Carrasco, Jill Sudduth, Emily LeSueur, Margot Thien
2nd place, silver medalist(s)		Canada; Karen Clark, Sylvie Fréchette, Janice Bremner, Karen Fonteyne, Christine Larsen, Erin Woodley, Cari Read, Lisa Alexander, Valérie Hould-Marchand, Kasia Kulesza
3rd place, bronze medalist(s)		Japan; Miya Tachibana, Akiko Kawase, Rei Jimbo, Miho Takeda, Raika Fujii, Miho Kawabe, Junko Tanaka, Riho Nakajima, Mayuko Fujiki, Kaori Takahashi

At the 1996 Summer Olympics in Atlanta, the team event in women's synchronized swimming was contested. It was the first appearance of the team event, which replaced the duet and solo events held previously. (The duet event would return four years later.)

Eight countries qualified for the Olympic Games at an Olympic qualifying event held in conjunction with the 1995 FINA Synchronized Swimming World Cup. Each team consisted of eight swimmers (chosen from a total team of ten). The competition included two events, the technical routine program and the free routine program.

The technical routine required entries to perform a series of required elements in prescribed order. It had a time limit of two minutes and 50 seconds. Music selection and choreography was up to the discretion of each team. In the free routine, there were no specifications for the routine other than the five-minute time limit. In both the technical and free routines, a panel of 10 judges (five giving scores for technical merit and five awarding scores for artistic impression) awarded points from 0 to 10 in one tenth point increments.

When the technical merit and artistic impression scores were calculated for a total score, the technical routine score was weighted to 35 percent and the free routine to 65 percent. These two scores were then combined to determine overall medal placement.

== Schedule ==
Date	Time	Round
Tuesday, July 30, 1996	19:30	Free routine
Friday, August 2, 1996	19:30	Technical routine

== Results ==
Rank	Country	Athletes	Technical	Free	Total
1st place, gold medalist(s)	United States	Suzannah Bianco, Tammy Cleland, Becky Dyroen-Lancer, Heather Pease, Jill Savery, Nathalie Schneyder, Heather Simmons-Carrasco, Jill Sudduth, Emily LeSueur, Margot Thien	34.720	65.000	99.720
2nd place, silver medalist(s)	Canada	Karen Clark, Sylvie Fréchette, Janice Bremner, Karen Fonteyne, Christine Larsen, Erin Woodley, Cari Read, Lisa Alexander, Valérie Hould-Marchand, Kasia Kulesza	34.277	64.090	98.367
3rd place, bronze medalist(s)	Japan	Miya Tachibana, Akiko Kawase, Rei Jimbo, Miho Takeda, Raika Fujii, Miho Kawabe, Junko Tanaka, Riho Nakajima, Mayuko Fujiki, Kaori Takahashi	34.183	63.570	97.753
4	Russia	Elena Azarova, Anna Iouriaeva, Mariya Kiselyova, Olga Brusnikina, Yelena Antonova, Marina Lobova, Youlia Pankratova, Olga Novokshchenova, Gana Maximova, Olga Sedakova	33.950	63.310	97.260
5	France	Virginie Dedieu, Marianne Aeschbacher, Myriam Lignot, Celine Leveque, Julie Fabre, Isabelle Manable, Magali Rathier, Charlotte Massardier, Delphine Maréchal, Éva Riffet	33.460	62.616	96.076
6	Italy	Serena Bianchi, Giada Ballan, Manuela Carnini, Mara Brunetti, Giovanna Burlando, Brunella Carrafelli, Roberta Farinelli, Paola Celli, Maurizia Cecconi, Letizia Nuzzo	32.807	61.446	94.253
7	China	Li Min, Long Yan, Chen Xuan, Wu Chunlan, Li Yuanyuan, Jin Na, Fu Yuling, Li Fei, Guo Cui, Pan Yan	33.110	61.014	94.124
8	Mexico	Wendy Aguilar, Olivia González, Lilián Leal, Ingrid Reich, Aline Reich, Patricia Vila, Ariadna Medina, Berenice Guzmán, Perla Ramírez, Erika Leal	33.04	60.796	93.836
