= List of World Aquatics Championships medalists in synchronised swimming =

This is the complete list of the World Aquatics Championships medalists in synchronised swimming from 1973 to 2025.

== Men ==
Bold numbers in brackets denotes record number of victories in corresponding disciplines.

=== Solo free routine ===
Games	Gold	Silver	Bronze
2023 Fukuoka	Dennis González; Spain	Gustavo Sánchez; Colombia	Kenneth Gaudet; United States
2024 Doha	Giorgio Minisini; Italy	Dennis González; Spain	Gustavo Sánchez; Colombia
2025 Singapore	Aleksandr Maltsev; Neutral Athletes B	Guo Muye; China	Filippo Pelati; Italy

Medal table as of 2025

Rank	Nation	Gold	Silver	Bronze	Total
1	Spain	1	1	0	2
2	Italy	1	0	1	2
3	Neutral Athletes B (Note: At the 2025 World Championships, in accordance with sanctions imposed following by the 2022 Russian invasion of Ukraine, athletes from Russia were not permitted to use the name, flag, or anthem of Russia. They instead participated as "Neutral Athletes B (NAB)" and under the World Aquatics flag.)	1	0	0	1
4	Colombia	0	1	1	2
5	China	0	1	0	1
6	United States	0	0	1	1
Totals (6 entries)		3	3	3	9

=== Solo technical routine ===
Games	Gold	Silver	Bronze
2023 Fukuoka	Fernando Díaz del Río; Spain	Kenneth Gaudet; United States	Eduard Kim; Kazakhstan
2024 Doha	Yang Shuncheng; China	Giorgio Minisini; Italy	Gustavo Sánchez; Colombia
2025 Singapore	Aleksandr Maltsev; Neutral Athletes B	Dennis González; Spain	Diego Villalobos; Mexico

Medal table

Rank	Nation	Gold	Silver	Bronze	Total
1	Spain	1	1	0	2
2	China	1	0	0	1
2	Neutral Athletes B	1	0	0	1
4	Italy	0	1	0	1
4	United States	0	1	0	1
6	Colombia	0	0	1	1
6	Kazakhstan	0	0	1	1
6	Mexico	0	0	1	1
Totals (8 entries)		3	3	3	9

== Women ==
Bold numbers in brackets denotes record number of victories in corresponding disciplines.

=== Solo routine ===
Games	Gold	Silver	Bronze
1973 Belgrade	Teresa Andersen; United States	Jojo Carrier; Canada	Junko Hasumi; Japan
1975 Cali	Gail Buzonas; United States	Sylvie Fortier; Canada	Yasuko Unezaki; Japan
1978 West Berlin	Helen Vanderburg; Canada	Pam Tryon; United States	Yasuko Unezaki; Japan
1982 Guayaquil	Tracie Ruiz; United States	Kelly Kryczka; Canada	Miwako Motoyoshi; Japan
1986 Madrid	Carolyn Waldo; Canada	Sarah Josephson; United States	Muriel Hermine; France
1991 Perth	Sylvie Fréchette; Canada	Kristen Babb-Sprague; United States	Mikako Kotani; Japan
1994 Rome	Becky Dyroen-Lancer; United States	Fumiko Okuno; Japan	Lisa Alexander; Canada
1998 Perth	Olga Sedakova; Russia	Virginie Dedieu; France	Miya Tachibana; Japan
2001 Fukuoka	Olga Brusnikina; Russia	Virginie Dedieu; France	Miya Tachibana; Japan
2003 Barcelona	Virginie Dedieu; France	Anastasia Ermakova; Russia	Gemma Mengual; Spain
2005 Montreal	Virginie Dedieu (2); France	Natalia Ischenko; Russia	Gemma Mengual; Spain

Medal table

Rank	Nation	Gold	Silver	Bronze	Total
1	United States	4	3	0	7
2	Canada	3	3	1	7
3	France	2	2	1	5
4	Russia	2	2	0	4
5	Japan	0	1	7	8
6	Spain	0	0	2	2
Totals (6 entries)		11	11	11	33

==== Solo free routine ====
Games	Gold	Silver	Bronze
2007 Melbourne	Virginie Dedieu; France	Natalia Ischenko; Russia	Gemma Mengual; Spain
2009 Rome	Natalia Ischenko; Russia	Gemma Mengual; Spain	Beatrice Adelizzi; Italy
2011 Shanghai	Natalia Ischenko; Russia	Andrea Fuentes; Spain	Sun Wenyan; China
2013 Barcelona	Svetlana Romashina; Russia	Huang Xuechen; China	Ona Carbonell; Spain
2015 Kazan	Natalia Ischenko (3); Russia	Huang Xuechen; China	Ona Carbonell; Spain
2017 Budapest	Svetlana Kolesnichenko; Russia	Ona Carbonell; Spain	Anna Voloshyna; Ukraine
2019 Gwangju	Svetlana Romashina; Russia	Ona Carbonell; Spain	Yukiko Inui; Japan
2022 Budapest	Yukiko Inui; Japan	Marta Fiedina; Ukraine	Evangelia Platanioti; Greece
2023 Fukuoka	Yukiko Inui; Japan	Vasiliki Alexandri; Austria	Kate Shortman; Great Britain
2024 Doha	Jacqueline Simoneau; Canada	Evangelia Platanioti; Greece	Vasilina Khandoshka; Neutral Independent Athletes
2025 Singapore	Iris Tió; Spain	Xu Huiyan; China	Vasilina Khandoshka; Neutral Athletes A

Medal table

Rank	Nation	Gold	Silver	Bronze	Total
1	Russia	6	1	0	7
2	Japan	2	0	1	3
3	Spain	1	4	3	8
4	Canada	1	0	0	1
4	France	1	0	0	1
6	China	0	3	1	4
7	Greece	0	1	1	2
7	Ukraine	0	1	1	2
9	Austria	0	1	0	1
10	Great Britain	0	0	1	1
10	Italy	0	0	1	1
10	Neutral Athletes A (Note: At the 2025 World Championships, in accordance with sanctions imposed following by the 2022 Russian invasion of Ukraine, athletes from Belarus were not permitted to use the name, flag, or anthem of Belarus. They instead participated as "Neutral Athletes A (NAA)" and under the World Aquatics flag.)	0	0	1	1
10	Neutral Independent Athletes (Note: At the 2024 World Championships, in accordance with sanctions imposed following by the 2022 Russian invasion of Ukraine, athletes from Belarus were not permitted to use the name, flag, or anthem of Belarus. They instead participated as "Neutral Independent Athletes (NIA)" and under the World Aquatics flag.)	0	0	1	1
Totals (13 entries)		11	11	11	33

==== Solo technical routine ====
Games	Gold	Silver	Bronze
2007 Melbourne	Natalia Ischenko; Russia	Gemma Mengual; Spain	Saho Harada; Japan
2009 Rome	Natalia Ischenko; Russia	Gemma Mengual; Spain	Marie-Pier Boudreau Gagnon; Canada
2011 Shanghai	Natalia Ischenko (3); Russia	Huang Xuechen; China	Andrea Fuentes; Spain
2013 Barcelona	Svetlana Romashina; Russia	Huang Xuechen; China	Ona Carbonell; Spain
2015 Kazan	Svetlana Romashina; Russia	Ona Carbonell; Spain	Sun Wenyan; China
2017 Budapest	Svetlana Kolesnichenko; Russia	Ona Carbonell; Spain	Anna Voloshyna; Ukraine
2019 Gwangju	Svetlana Kolesnichenko; Russia	Ona Carbonell; Spain	Yukiko Inui; Japan
2022 Budapest	Yukiko Inui; Japan	Marta Fiedina; Ukraine	Evangelia Platanioti; Greece
2023 Fukuoka	Yukiko Inui; Japan	Vasiliki Alexandri; Austria	Iris Tió; Spain
2024 Doha	Evangelia Platanioti; Greece	Jacqueline Simoneau; Canada	Xu Huiyan; China
2025 Singapore	Xu Huiyan; China	Vasilina Khandoshka; Neutral Athletes A	Iris Tió; Spain

Medal table

Rank	Nation	Gold	Silver	Bronze	Total
1	Russia	7	0	0	7
2	Japan	2	0	2	4
3	China	1	2	2	5
4	Greece	1	0	1	2
5	Spain	0	5	4	9
6	Canada	0	1	1	2
6	Ukraine	0	1	1	2
8	Austria	0	1	0	1
8	Neutral Athletes A	0	1	0	1
Totals (9 entries)		11	11	11	33

=== Duet routine ===
Games	Gold	Silver	Bronze
1973 Belgrade	Teresa Andersen and Gail Johnson (USA)	Jojo Carrier and Madeleine Ramsay (CAN)	Masako Fujiwara and Yasuko Fujiwara (JPN)
1975 Cali	Robin Curren and Amanda Norrish (USA)	Carol Stewart and Laura Wilkin (CAN)	Masako Fujiwara and Yasuko Fujiwara (JPN)
1978 West Berlin	Michelle Calkins and Helen Vanderburg (CAN)	Masako Fujiwara and Yasuko Fujiwara (JPN)	Michele Barone and Pam Tryon (USA)
1982 Guayaquil	Sharon Hambrook and Kelly Kryczka (CAN)	Candy Costie and Tracie Ruiz (USA)	Ikuko Abe and Masako Fujiwara (JPN)
1986 Madrid	Michelle Cameron and Carolyn Waldo (CAN)	Karen Josephson and Sarah Josephson (USA)	Megumi Itō and Mikako Kotani (JPN)
1991 Perth	Karen Josephson and Sarah Josephson (USA)	Mikako Kotani and Aki Takayama (JPN)	Lisa Alexander and Kathy Glen (CAN)
1994 Rome	Becky Dyroen-Lancer and Jill Sudduth (USA)	Lisa Alexander and Erin Woodley (CAN)	None awarded
1994 Rome	Becky Dyroen-Lancer and Jill Sudduth (USA)	Fumiko Okuno and Miya Tachibana (JPN)	None awarded
1998 Perth	Olga Brusnikina and Olga Sedakova (RUS)	Miya Tachibana and Miho Takeda (JPN)	Virginie Dedieu and Myriam Lignot (FRA)
2001 Fukuoka	Miya Tachibana and Miho Takeda (JPN)	Anastasia Davydova and Anastasia Ermakova (RUS)	Claire Carver-Dias and Fanny Létourneau (CAN)
2003 Barcelona	Anastasia Davydova and Anastasia Ermakova (RUS)	Miya Tachibana and Miho Takeda (JPN)	Gemma Mengual and Paola Tirados (ESP)
2005 Montreal	Anastasia Davydova (2) and Anastasia Ermakova (2) (RUS)	Gemma Mengual and Paola Tirados (ESP)	Saho Harada and Emiko Suzuki (JPN)

Medal table

Rank	Nation	Gold	Silver	Bronze	Total
1	United States	4	2	1	7
2	Canada	3	3	2	8
3	Russia	3	1	0	4
4	Japan	1	5	5	11
5	Spain	0	1	1	2
6	France	0	0	1	1
Totals (6 entries)		11	12	10	33

==== Duet free routine ====
Games	Gold	Silver	Bronze
2007 Melbourne	Anastasia Davydova and Anastasia Ermakova (RUS)	Gemma Mengual and Paola Tirados (ESP)	Ayako Matsumura and Emiko Suzuki (JPN)
2009 Rome	Natalia Ishchenko and Svetlana Romashina (RUS)	Andrea Fuentes and Gemma Mengual (ESP)	Jiang Tingting and Jiang Wenwen (CHN)
2011 Shanghai	Natalia Ishchenko and Svetlana Romashina (RUS)	Jiang Tingting and Jiang Wenwen (CHN)	Ona Carbonell and Andrea Fuentes (ESP)
2013 Barcelona	Svetlana Kolesnichenko and Svetlana Romashina (RUS)	Jiang Tingting and Jiang Wenwen (CHN)	Ona Carbonell and Margalida Crespí (ESP)
2015 Kazan	Natalia Ishchenko and Svetlana Romashina (RUS)	Huang Xuechen and Sun Wenyan (CHN)	Lolita Ananasova and Anna Voloshyna (UKR)
2017 Budapest	Svetlana Kolesnichenko and Alexandra Patskevich (RUS)	Jiang Tingting and Jiang Wenwen (CHN)	Anna Voloshyna and Yelyzaveta Yakhno (UKR)
2019 Gwangju	Svetlana Kolesnichenko and Svetlana Romashina (5) (RUS)	Huang Xuechen and Sun Wenyan (CHN)	Marta Fiedina and Anastasiya Savchuk (UKR)
2022 Budapest	Wang Liuyi and Wang Qianyi (CHN)	Maryna Aleksiiva and Vladyslava Aleksiiva (UKR)	Anna-Maria Alexandri and Eirini-Marina Alexandri (AUT)
2023 Fukuoka	Anna-Maria Alexandri and Eirini-Marina Alexandri (AUT)	Wang Liuyi and Wang Qianyi (CHN)	Moe Higa and Mashiro Yasunaga (JPN)
2024 Doha	Wang Liuyi and Wang Qianyi (CHN)	Bregje de Brouwer and Noortje de Brouwer (NED)	Kate Shortman and Isabelle Thorpe (GBR)
2025 Singapore	Lilou Lluís and Iris Tió (ESP)	Enrica Piccoli and Lucrezia Ruggiero (ITA)	Mayya Doroshko and Tatiana Gayday (NAB)

Medal table

Rank	Nation	Gold	Silver	Bronze	Total
1	Russia	7	0	0	7
2	China	2	6	1	9
3	Spain	1	2	2	5
4	Austria	1	0	1	2
5	Ukraine	0	1	3	4
6	Italy	0	1	0	1
6	Netherlands	0	1	0	1
8	Japan	0	0	2	2
9	Great Britain	0	0	1	1
9	Neutral Athletes B	0	0	1	1
Totals (10 entries)		11	11	11	33

==== Duet technical routine ====
Games	Gold	Silver	Bronze
2007 Melbourne	Anastasia Davydova and Anastasia Ermakova (RUS)	Gemma Mengual and Paola Tirados (ESP)	Saho Harada and Emiko Suzuki (JPN)
2009 Rome	Anastasia Davydova and Svetlana Romashina (RUS)	Andrea Fuentes and Gemma Mengual (ESP)	Jiang Tingting and Jiang Wenwen (CHN)
2011 Shanghai	Natalia Ishchenko and Svetlana Romashina (RUS)	Huang Xuechen and Liu Ou (CHN)	Ona Carbonell and Andrea Fuentes (ESP)
2013 Barcelona	Svetlana Kolesnichenko and Svetlana Romashina (RUS)	Jiang Tingting and Jiang Wenwen (CHN)	Ona Carbonell and Margalida Crespí (ESP)
2015 Kazan	Natalia Ishchenko and Svetlana Romashina (RUS)	Huang Xuechen and Sun Wenyan (CHN)	Yukiko Inui and Risako Mitsui (JPN)
2017 Budapest	Svetlana Kolesnichenko and Alexandra Patskevich (RUS)	Jiang Tingting and Jiang Wenwen (CHN)	Anna Voloshyna and Yelyzaveta Yakhno (UKR)
2019 Gwangju	Svetlana Kolesnichenko and Svetlana Romashina (5) (RUS)	Huang Xuechen and Sun Wenyan (CHN)	Marta Fiedina and Anastasiya Savchuk (UKR)
2022 Budapest	Wang Liuyi and Wang Qianyi (CHN)	Maryna Aleksiiva and Vladyslava Aleksiiva (UKR)	Anna-Maria Alexandri and Eirini-Marina Alexandri (AUT)
2023 Fukuoka	Moe Higa and Mashiro Yasunaga (JPN)	Linda Cerruti and Lucrezia Ruggiero (ITA)	Alisa Ozhogina and Iris Tió (ESP)
2024 Doha	Wang Liuyi and Wang Qianyi (CHN)	Kate Shortman and Isabelle Thorpe (GBR)	Alisa Ozhogina and Iris Tió (ESP)
2025 Singapore	Anna-Maria Alexandri and Eirini-Marina Alexandri (AUT)	Lin Yanhan and Lin Yanjun (CHN)	Mayya Doroshko and Tatiana Gayday (NAB)

Medal table

Rank	Nation	Gold	Silver	Bronze	Total
1	Russia	7	0	0	7
2	China	2	6	1	9
3	Japan	1	0	2	3
4	Austria	1	0	1	2
5	Spain	0	2	4	6
6	Ukraine	0	1	2	3
7	Great Britain	0	1	0	1
7	Italy	0	1	0	1
9	Neutral Athletes B	0	0	1	1
Totals (9 entries)		11	11	11	33

=== Team routine ===
Games	Gold	Silver	Bronze
1973 Belgrade	United States	Canada	Japan
1975 Cali	United States	Canada	Japan
1978 West Berlin	United States	Japan	Canada
1982 Guayaquil	Canada	United States	Japan
1986 Madrid	Canada	United States	Japan
1991 Perth	United States	Canada	Japan
1994 Rome	United States	Canada	Japan
1998 Perth	Russia	Japan	United States
2001 Fukuoka	Russia	Japan	Canada
2003 Barcelona	Russia	Japan	United States
2005 Montreal	Russia	Japan	Spain

Medal table

Rank	Nation	Gold	Silver	Bronze	Total
1	United States	5	2	2	9
2	Russia	4	0	0	4
3	Canada	2	4	2	8
4	Japan	0	5	6	11
5	Spain	0	0	1	1
Totals (5 entries)		11	11	11	33

==== Team free routine ====
Games	Gold	Silver	Bronze
2007 Melbourne	Russia	Spain	Japan
2009 Rome	Russia	Spain	China
2011 Shanghai	Russia	China	Spain
2013 Barcelona	Russia	Spain	Ukraine
2015 Kazan	Russia	China	Japan
2017 Budapest	Russia	China	Ukraine
2019 Gwangju	Russia	China	Ukraine
2022 Budapest	China	Ukraine	Japan

Medal table

Rank	Nation	Gold	Silver	Bronze	Total
1	Russia	7	0	0	7
2	China	1	4	1	6
3	Spain	0	3	1	4
4	Ukraine	0	1	3	4
5	Japan	0	0	3	3
Totals (5 entries)		8	8	8	24

==== Team technical routine ====
Games	Gold	Silver	Bronze
2007 Melbourne	Russia	Japan	Spain
2009 Rome	Russia	Spain	China
2011 Shanghai	Russia	China	Spain
2013 Barcelona	Russia	Spain	Ukraine
2015 Kazan	Russia	China	Japan
2017 Budapest	Russia	China	Japan
2019 Gwangju	Russia	China	Ukraine
2022 Budapest	China	Japan	Italy

Medal table

Rank	Nation	Gold	Silver	Bronze	Total
1	Russia	7	0	0	7
2	China	1	4	1	6
3	Japan	0	2	2	4
3	Spain	0	2	2	4
5	Ukraine	0	0	2	2
6	Italy	0	0	1	1
Totals (6 entries)		8	8	8	24

=== Free routine combination ===
Games	Gold	Silver	Bronze
2003 Barcelona	Japan	Spain	None awarded
2003 Barcelona	Japan	United States	None awarded
2005 Montreal	Russia	Japan	Spain
2007 Melbourne	Russia	Japan	United States
2009 Rome	Spain	China	Canada
2011 Shanghai	Russia	China	Canada
2013 Barcelona	Russia	Spain	Ukraine
2015 Kazan	Russia	China	Japan
2017 Budapest	China	Ukraine	Japan
2019 Gwangju	Russia	China	Ukraine
2022 Budapest	Ukraine	Japan	Italy

Medal table

Rank	Nation	Gold	Silver	Bronze	Total
1	Russia	6	0	0	6
2	China	1	4	0	5
3	Japan	1	3	2	6
4	Spain	1	2	1	4
5	Ukraine	1	1	2	4
6	United States	0	1	1	2
7	Canada	0	0	2	2
8	Italy	0	0	1	1
Totals (8 entries)		10	11	9	30

=== Highlight routine ===
Games	Gold	Silver	Bronze
2019 Gwangju	Ukraine	Italy	Spain
2022 Budapest	Ukraine	Italy	Spain

Medal table

Rank	Nation	Gold	Silver	Bronze	Total
1	Ukraine	2	0	0	2
2	Italy	0	2	0	2
3	Spain	0	0	2	2
Totals (3 entries)		2	2	2	6

== Mixed ==
Bold numbers in brackets denotes record number of victories in corresponding disciplines.

=== Duet free routine ===
Games	Gold	Silver	Bronze
2015 Kazan	Darina Valitova and Aleksandr Maltsev (RUS)	Kristina Lum and Bill May (USA)	Mariangela Perrupato and Giorgio Minisini (ITA)
2017 Budapest	Mikhaela Kalancha and Aleksandr Maltsev (RUS)	Mariangela Perrupato and Giorgio Minisini (ITA)	Kanako Spendlove and Bill May (USA)
2019 Gwangju	Mayya Gurbanberdieva and Aleksandr Maltsev (3) (RUS)	Manila Flamini and Giorgio Minisini (ITA)	Yumi Adachi and Atsushi Abe (JPN)
2022 Budapest	Lucrezia Ruggiero and Giorgio Minisini (ITA)	Tomoka Sato and Yotaro Sato (JPN)	Zhang Yiyao and Shi Haoyu (CHN)
2023 Fukuoka	Cheng Wentao and Shi Haoyu (CHN)	Itzamary González and Diego Villalobos (MEX)	Mireia Hernández and Dennis González (ESP)
2024 Doha	Cheng Wentao and Shi Haoyu (CHN)	Mireia Hernández and Dennis González (ESP)	Trinidad Meza and Diego Villalobos (MEX)
2025 Singapore	Iris Tió and Dennis González (ESP)	Olesia Platonova and Aleksandr Maltsev (NAB)	Isabelle Thorpe and Ranjuo Tomblin (GBR)

Medal table

Rank	Nation	Gold	Silver	Bronze	Total
1	Russia	3	0	0	3
2	China	2	0	1	3
3	Italy	1	2	1	4
4	Spain	1	1	1	3
5	Japan	0	1	1	2
5	Mexico	0	1	1	2
5	United States	0	1	1	2
8	Neutral Athletes B	0	1	0	1
9	Great Britain	0	0	1	1
Totals (9 entries)		7	7	7	21

=== Duet technical routine ===
Games	Gold	Silver	Bronze
2015 Kazan	Christina Jones and Bill May (USA)	Darina Valitova and Aleksandr Maltsev (RUS)	Manila Flamini and Giorgio Minisini (ITA)
2017 Budapest	Manila Flamini and Giorgio Minisini (ITA)	Mikhaela Kalancha and Aleksandr Maltsev (RUS)	Kanako Spendlove and Bill May (USA)
2019 Gwangju	Mayya Gurbanberdieva and Aleksandr Maltsev (RUS)	Manila Flamini and Giorgio Minisini (ITA)	Yumi Adachi and Atsushi Abe (JPN)
2022 Budapest	Lucrezia Ruggiero and Giorgio Minisini (2) (ITA)	Tomoka Sato and Yotaro Sato (JPN)	Zhang Yiyao and Shi Haoyu (CHN)
2023 Fukuoka	Tomoka Sato and Yotaro Sato (JPN)	Emma García and Dennis González (ESP)	Cheng Wentao and Shi Haoyu (CHN)
2024 Doha	Nargiza Bolatova and Eduard Kim (KAZ)	Cheng Wentao and Shi Haoyu (CHN)	Miranda Barrera and Diego Villalobos (MEX)
2025 Singapore	Mayya Gurbanberdieva and Aleksandr Maltsev (NAB)	Mireia Hernández and Dennis González (ESP)	Lucrezia Ruggiero and Filippo Pelati (ITA)

Medal table

Rank	Nation	Gold	Silver	Bronze	Total
1	Italy	2	1	2	5
2	Russia	1	2	0	3
3	Japan	1	1	1	3
4	United States	1	0	1	2
5	Kazakhstan	1	0	0	1
5	Neutral Athletes B	1	0	0	1
7	Spain	0	2	0	2
8	China	0	1	2	3
9	Mexico	0	0	1	1
Totals (9 entries)		7	7	7	21

=== Team free routine ===
Games	Gold	Silver	Bronze
2023 Fukuoka	China	Japan	Ukraine
2024 Doha	China	Japan	United States
2025 Singapore	China	Japan	Spain

Medal table

Rank	Nation	Gold	Silver	Bronze	Total
1	China	3	0	0	3
2	Japan	0	3	0	3
3	Spain	0	0	1	1
3	Ukraine	0	0	1	1
3	United States	0	0	1	1
Totals (5 entries)		3	3	3	9

=== Team technical routine ===
Games	Gold	Silver	Bronze
2023 Fukuoka	Spain	Italy	United States
2024 Doha	China	Spain	Japan
2025 Singapore	China	Neutral Athletes B	Spain

Medal table

Rank	Nation	Gold	Silver	Bronze	Total
1	China	2	0	0	2
2	Spain	1	1	1	3
3	Italy	0	1	0	1
3	Neutral Athletes B	0	1	0	1
5	Japan	0	0	1	1
5	United States	0	0	1	1
Totals (6 entries)		3	3	3	9

=== Acrobatic routine ===
Games	Gold	Silver	Bronze
2023 Fukuoka	China	United States	Japan
2024 Doha	China	Ukraine	United States
2025 Singapore	China	Neutral Athletes B	Spain

Medal table

Rank	Nation	Gold	Silver	Bronze	Total
1	China	3	0	0	3
2	United States	0	1	1	2
3	Neutral Athletes B	0	1	0	1
3	Ukraine	0	1	0	1
5	Japan	0	0	1	1
5	Spain	0	0	1	1
Totals (6 entries)		3	3	3	9

== All-time medal table 1973–2025 ==
Updated after the 2025 World Aquatics Championships.

Rank	Nation	Gold	Silver	Bronze	Total
1	Russia	60	6	0	66
2	China	19	31	10	60
3	United States	14	11	10	35
4	Canada	9	11	8	28
5	Japan	8	21	36	65
6	Spain	7	27	27	61
7	Italy	4	9	7	20
8	Ukraine	3	7	15	25
9	Neutral Athletes B	3	3	2	8
10	France	3	2	2	7
11	Austria	2	2	2	6
12	Greece	1	1	2	4
13	Kazakhstan	1	0	1	2
14	Great Britain	0	1	3	4
14	Mexico	0	1	3	4
16	Colombia	0	1	2	3
17	Neutral Athletes A	0	1	1	2
18	Netherlands	0	1	0	1
19	Neutral Independent Athletes	0	0	1	1
Totals (19 entries)		134	136	132	402

== Multiple medalists ==
Boldface denotes active synchronised swimmers and highest medal count per type. The medals won as reserve were not included into these tables.

=== Ranked by their gold medals ===
Rank	Synchronised swimmer	Country	From	To	Gold	Silver	Bronze	Total
1	Svetlana Romashina	Russia	2005	2019	**21**	–	–	21
2	Natalia Ishchenko	Russia	2005	2015	19	2	–	21
3	Svetlana Kolesnichenko	Russia	2011	2019	16	–	–	16
4	Alla Shishkina	Russia	2009	2019	14	–	–	14
5	Anastasia Davydova	Russia	2001	2011	13	1	–	14
6	Alexandra Patskevich	Russia	2009	2017	13	–	–	13
7	**Feng Yu**	China	2017	2025	11	5	–	16
8	**Chang Hao**	China	2017	2025	11	3	–	14
9	Vlada Chigireva	Russia	2013	2019	11	–	–	11
9	Maria Shurochkina	Russia	2013	2019	11	–	–	11
9	Angelika Timanina	Russia	2009	2015	11	–	–	11

=== Ranked by their total medals ===
Rank	Synchronised swimmer	Country	From	To	Gold	Silver	Bronze	Total
1	Ona Carbonell	Spain	2007	2019	1	10	**11**	**22**
2	Svetlana Romashina	Russia	2005	2019	**21**	–	–	21
3	Natalia Ishchenko	Russia	2005	2015	19	2	–	21
4	Gemma Mengual	Spain	2003	2009	1	11	7	19
5	Huang Xuechen	China	2009	2019	–	**16**	2	18
6	Svetlana Kolesnichenko	Russia	2011	2019	16	–	–	16
7	**Feng Yu**	China	2017	2025	11	5	–	16
8	Andrea Fuentes	Spain	2003	2011	1	7	8	16
9	Sun Wenyan	China	2009	2019	–	14	2	16
10	Alla Shishkina	Russia	2009	2019	14	–	–	14
