= Synchronised swimming at the 1991 World Aquatics Championships =

These are the results from the synchronised swimming competition at the 1991 World Aquatics Championships. The United States was the top achiever in the 1991 world championship, winning two gold medals and 1 silver.

== Medal table ==
Rank	Nation	Gold	Silver	Bronze	Total
1	United States (USA)	2	1	0	3
2	Canada (CAN)	1	1	1	3
3	Japan (JPN)	0	1	2	3
Totals (3 entries)		3	3	3	9

== Medal summary ==
Event	Gold	Silver	Bronze
Solo routine	Sylvie Fréchette (CAN); 201.013	Kristen Babb-Sprague (USA); 196.314	Mikako Kotani (JPN); 195.110
Duet routine	Karen Josephson (USA); Sarah Josephson (USA); 199.762	Mikako Kotani (JPN); Aki Takayama (JPN); 194.307	Lisa Alexander (CAN); Kathy Glen (CAN); 192.649
Team routine	United States Kristen Babb-Sprague; Becky Dyroen; Karen Josephson; Sarah Josephson; Jill Savery; Nathalie Schneyder; Heather Simmons; Michelle Svitenko; 196.144	Canada Lisa Alexander; Karen Clark; Charlene Davies; Karen Fonteyne; Kathy Glen; Heather Johnston; Christine Larsen; Cari Read; 193.259	Japan Hisako Aoishi; Mina Enkaku; Kiyoko Ishibashi; Ikuko Kato; Fumiko Okuno; Aki Takayama; Yumi Wakabayashi; Chiaki Yamamura; 189.753

== Multiple medal winners ==
- Mikako Kotani (Japan): won 2 silver medals.
