= Heather Simmons-Carrasco =

American synchronized swimmer (born 1970)

Personal information
- Born: May 25, 1970 (age 56) Mountain View, California, U.S.
- Education: West Valley College
- Occupation: Synchronized Swim Coach
- Spouse: Victor Carrasco

Sport
- Club: Santa Clara Aquamaids
- Coached by: Chris Carver (SC Aquamaids)
Medal record
Synchronized swimming
Representing the United States
Olympic Games
Gold medal – first place	1996 Atlanta	Team
World Championships
Gold medal – first place	1994 Rome	Team

Heather Jean Simmons-Carrasco (born May 25, 1970) is an American competitor in synchronized swimming and Olympic champion, who competed with the strong Santa Clara Aquamaids team. Born in Mountain View, California, she competed for the American Olympic team that received a gold medal in synchronized swimming at the 1996 Summer Olympics in Atlanta. With a long and distinguished career from 1989-1996, Simmons-Carrasco earned a total of eight team gold medals in team competitions which the Olympic Games, World Championships, World Cups, and the FINA World Championships. She was part of one of the most winning teams in the history of synchronized swimming.

Simmons-Carrasco participated as a youth with Chris Carver's strong Santa Clara Aquamaids team. Carver coached the Aquamaids from 1980-2022 when including her early years working with swimmers under the age of 10. By the 1990's, specializing in both group routines and team competition, she became known as a member of both the Santa Clara Aquamaids club and U.S. National team. Her early success on the international level included winning team event gold medals at Perth, Australia's 1991 World Aquatics Championships, and Rome Italy's 1994 World Aquatics Championships. At the 1995 Pan American Games, she was part of another group competition gold medal in Mar del Plata, Argentina. She married Victor Carrasco around the Fall of 1995, prior to her participation in the Olymp[ics

== 1996 Atlanta Olympics ==
Simmons-Carrasco participated in the 1996 Atlanta Olympics under Co-Head Synchronized swimming Olympic Coaches Chris Carver, with whom she had competed for many years, and Gail Emery, coach of the Walnut Creek Aquanuts. Simmons-Carrasco competed with the gold medal winning team of Suzannah Bianco, Tammy Cleland, Becky Dyroen-Lancer, Emily LeSueur, Heather Pease, Jill Savery, Nathalie Schneyder, Jill Sudduth, and Margot Thien. The U.S. finished with a score of 99.720 points, and received nine perfect 10s from the judges for their performance. It was the first-ever Synchronized Swim Team event. The Canadian team placed second with a total of 98.367 points, and the team from Japan won the bronze with a total of 97.753 points.

She attended West Valley College in Saratoga, California, where she continued to train and compete in synchronized swimming while taking classes.

=== Careers ===
In 2013, Simmons-Carrasco coached the Santa Clara Aquamaids, her former team. From 2004-2016, she participated in swimming shows as a mermaid in Las Vegas at the Silverton Casino in Las Vegas. Her 13-15 year-old age group teams won many medals. In 2013 and beyond, she served as a coach for the US national team coach. She later coached the strong synchronized swimming program of the Walnut Creek Aquanauts.

=== Honors ===
Simmons-Carrasco was inducted into the International Swimming Hall of Fame for her exceptional winning record as a competitor with the Santa Clara Aquamaids, and her successful history of coaching with the Santa Clara Aquamaids team, the U.S. National team, and later the Walnut Creek Aquanuts.
