= Synchronised swimming at the 1994 World Aquatics Championships =

These are the results from the synchronized swimming competition at the 1994 World Aquatics Championships, which were held in Rome in September 1994.

== Medal table ==
| Rank | Nation | Gold | Silver | Bronze | Total |
|---|---|---|---|---|---|
| 1 | United States (USA) | 3 | 0 | 0 | 3 |
| 2 | Japan (JPN) | 0 | 2 | 1 | 3 |
| 3 | Canada (CAN) | 0 | 1 | 2 | 3 |
| Totals (3 entries) | | 3 | 3 | 3 | 9 |

== Medalists ==
| Event | Gold | | Silver | | Bronze | |
|---|---|---|---|---|---|---|
| Solo routine | Becky Dyroen-Lancer (USA) | 191.040 | Fumiko Okuno (JPN) | 187.306 | Lisa Alexander (CAN) | 186.826 |
| Duet routine | Becky Dyroen-Lancer (USA); Jill Sudduth (USA) | 187.009 | Fumiko Okuno (JPN); Miya Tachibana (JPN) | 186.259 | Lisa Alexander (CAN); Erin Woodley (CAN) | 186.259 |
| Team routine | United States (USA); Suzannah Bianco; Tammy Cleland; Becky Dyroen-Lancer; Jill Savery; Nathalie Schneyder; Heather Simmons; Jill Sudduth; Margot Thien | 185.883 | Canada (CAN); Lisa Alexander; Janice Bremner; Karen Clark; Carrie Daguerre; Karen Fonteyne; Kasia Kulesza; Cari Read; Erin Woodley | 183.263 | Japan (JPN); Raika Fujii; Akiko Kawase; Rei Jimbo; Fumiko Okuno; Miya Tachibana; Kaori Takahashi; Miho Takeda; Masayo Yajima | 183.215 |
