= Janice Bremner =

Canadian synchronized swimmer

Personal information
- Nationality: Canadian
- Born: July 15, 1974 (age 51)

Sport
- Sport: Synchronized swimming
Medal record
Representing Canada
Women's synchronized swimming
Olympic Games
| Silver medal – second place | 1996 Atlanta | Team |
World Aquatics Championships
| Silver medal – second place | 1994 Rome | Team |
Pan American Games
| Silver medal – second place | 1995 Mar del Plata | Team |

Janice Birch (née Bremner) (born July 15, 1974) was a Canadian competitor and Olympic medalist in synchronized swimming.

== Career ==
Birch began synchronized swimming in the late 1980s, but was most successful in the 1990s. Birch competed with the Canadian Synchronized Swimming Team, where they won a Silver Medal in 1994, at the World Aquatics Championships, and again at the 1995 Pan American Games. In the 1996 Summer Olympics in Atlanta, Birch and team members Christine Larsen, Sylvie Fréchette, and Valérie Hould-Marchand, won another Silver Medal. Soon after the 1996 Olympic Games, Birch retired from competitive swimming and began studying at the University of British Columbia. Birch helped carry the Olympic Torch for the 2010 Winter Olympics in Vancouver, British Columbia.

== Personal life ==
Birch graduated from UBC in 1999, and worked in fitness and health education. She now resides with her family in the Lower Mainland in British Columbia and is married with four children.
