= Synchronized swimming at the 1998 Asian Games =

- Venue: Thammasat Aquatic Center
- Dates: 13–15 December 1998
- Competitors: 16 from 7 nations

Synchronized swimming was contested from December 13 to December 15 at the 1998 Asian Games in Thammasat Aquatic Center, Bangkok, Thailand. A total of 16 athletes from seven nations competed in the event, Japan won both gold medals, South Korea won both silver medals and China won all bronze medals.

== Schedule ==
T	Technical routine	F	Free routine

Event↓/Date →	13th Sun	14th Mon	15th Tue
Women's solo	T	F	
Women's duet		T	F

== Medalists ==
Event	Gold	Silver	Bronze
Solo	Miya Tachibana; Japan	Choi Yoo-jin; South Korea	Li Yuanyuan; China
Duet	Japan; Miya Tachibana; Miho Takeda	South Korea; Jang Yoon-kyeong; Yoo Na-mi	China; Li Min; Long Yan

== Medal table ==
Rank	Nation	Gold	Silver	Bronze	Total
1	Japan (JPN)	2	0	0	2
2	South Korea (KOR)	0	2	0	2
3	China (CHN)	0	0	2	2
Totals (3 entries)		2	2	2	6

== Participating nations ==
A total of 16 athletes from 7 nations competed in synchronized swimming at the 1998 Asian Games:

- China (3)
- Hong Kong (1)
- Japan (2)
- Kazakhstan (2)
- South Korea (3)
- Thailand (3)
- Uzbekistan (2)
