= 1987 FINA Synchronised Swimming World Cup =

International synchronised swimming competition

The 3rd FINA Synchronised Swimming World Cup was held 1987 in Cairo, Egypt. It featured swimmers from 10 nations, swimming in three events: Solo, Duet and Team.

== Participating nations ==
10 nations swam at the 1987 Synchro World Cup:

- Austria
- Canada
- Egypt
- France
- Great Britain
- Japan
- Netherlands
- Soviet Union
- Switzerland
- United States

== Results ==
Event	Gold		Silver		Bronze	
Solo details	Carolyn Waldo; Canada	198.367	Tracie Ruiz; United States	197.450	Muriel Hermine; France	188.867
Duet details	Carolyn Waldo; Michelle Cameron; Canada	195.592	Karen Josephson; Sarah Josephson; United States	195.067	Mikako Kotani; Miyako Tanaka; Japan	187.467
Team details	United States	193.496	Canada	191.638	Japan	185.850

== Point standings ==
Place	Nation	Total
1	United States	57
2	Canada	55
3	Japan	41
4	France	36
5	Switzerland	24
6	Soviet Union	22
7	Netherlands	12
8	(United Kingdom) Great Britain	7
9	Egypt	4
10	Austria	1
