= Synchronized swimming at the 1992 Summer Olympics =

Synchronized swimming at the Games of the XXV Olympiad
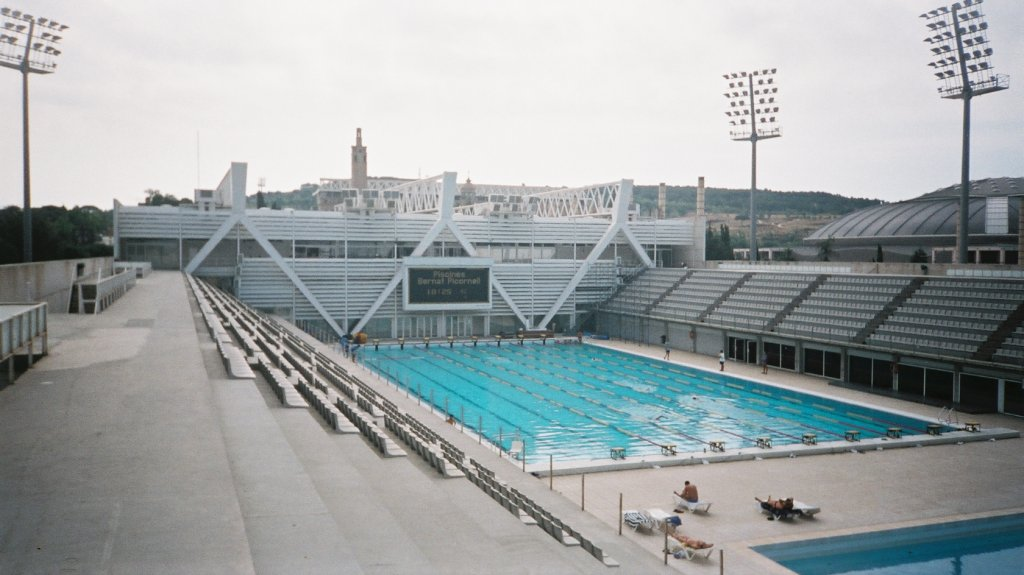
- Bernat Picornell Pools
- Venue: Piscines Bernat Picornell
- Dates: 2 to 7 August 1992
- Competitors: 53 from 22 nations

At the 1992 Summer Olympics in Barcelona, two events in synchronized swimming were contested, both for women only.

Two gold medals were awarded in solo synchronized swimming after a judge inadvertently entered the score of "8.7" instead of the intended "9.7" in the computerized scoring system for one of Sylvie Fréchette's figures. This error ultimately placed Fréchette second, leaving Kristen Babb-Sprague for the gold medal. Following an appeal FINA awarded Fréchette a gold medal, replacing her silver medal and leaving the two swimmers both with gold. This was the last time that solo synchronized swimming was included in the Olympic program before being replaced in favor of a team event.

== Qualification Summary ==
Nation	Solo	Duet	Athletes
Australia	X	X	2
Austria	X	X	2
Brazil	X	X	3
Canada	X	X	3
China	X	X	3
Czechoslovakia	X		1
Finland	X		1
France	X	X	3
Germany	X	X	2
Great Britain	X	X	3
Greece	X		1
Independent Olympic Participants	X	X	3
Italy	X	X	2
Japan	X	X	3
Mexico	X	X	3
Netherlands	X	X	3
South Africa	X	X	2
Spain	X	X	3
Switzerland	X	X	3
Unified Team	X	X	3
United States	X	X	3
Venezuela	X		1
Total: 22 NOC	22	18	

== Medal summary ==
Event	Gold	Silver	Bronze
Solo	Kristen Babb-Sprague; United States Sylvie Fréchette; Canada		Fumiko Okuno; Japan
Duet	United States; Karen Josephson; Sarah Josephson	Canada; Penny Vilagos; Vicky Vilagos	Japan; Fumiko Okuno; Aki Takayama

== Medal table ==
Rank	Nation	Gold	Silver	Bronze	Total
1	United States	2	0	0	2
2	Canada	1	1	0	2
3	Japan	0	0	2	2
Totals (3 entries)		3	1	2	6
