= Suddeth =

Suddeth is an English surname .

== Notables with this name include ==
- Greg Suddeth, screenwriter of Pet Shop (film)
- Lauren Alaina Kristine Suddeth, singer
- Jill Suddeth, Olympic synchronised swimmer with Heather Simmons-Carrasco
