= Riho Nakajima =

Japanese synchronized swimmer

Personal information
- Born: January 31, 1978 (age 48) Osakasayama, Japan

Sport
- Sport: Synchronised swimming
Medal record
Representing Japan
Olympic Games
Bronze medal – third place	1996 Atlanta	Team
World Championships
Silver medal – second place	1998 Perth	Team

Riho Nakajima (中島 理帆, Nakajima Riho; born 31 January 1978) is a Japanese former synchronized swimmer who competed in the 1996 Summer Olympics.
