= 1989 FINA World Junior Synchronised Swimming Championships =

The 1st FINA World Junior Synchronised Swimming Championships was held July 17-23, 1989 in Cali, Colombia. The synchronised swimmers are aged between 15 and 18 years old, swimming in three events: Solo, Duet and Team.

== Participating nations ==
- Aruba
- Brazil
- Canada
- China
- Colombia
- France
- Great Britain (United Kingdom)
- Italy
- Japan
- Netherlands
- Soviet Union
- Sweden
- United States

== Results ==
Event	Gold		Silver		Bronze	
Solo details	Becky Dyroen-Lancer (United States) USA	174.55	Karen Clark; Canada	171.80	Fumiko Okuno; Japan	169.65
Duet details	Becky Dyroen-Lancer; Jill Sudduth (United States) USA	172.84	Karen Clark; Keri Closson; Canada	171.60	Chiaki Yamamura; Nina Enkaku; Japan	168.34
Team details	(United States) USA	169.75	Canada	169.43	Japan	167.01
