= Synchronized swimming at the 1987 Pan American Games =

- Venue: Indiana University Natatorium
- No. of events: 3

Synchronized swimming at the 1987 Pan American Games was held from August 7 to August 23, 1987, in Indianapolis, United States. There were three medal events. Events were held at the Indiana University Natatorium.

== Medal table ==
Rank	Nation	Gold	Silver	Bronze	Total
1	United States (USA)	3	0	0	3
2	Canada (CAN)	0	3	0	3
3	Mexico (MEX)	0	0	2	2
4	Cuba (CUB)	0	0	1	1
Totals (4 entries)		3	3	3	9

== Medalists ==
Event	Gold		Silver		Bronze	
Solo	Tracie Ruiz; United States	195.484	Sylvie Fréchette; Canada	188.184	Teresa Pérez; Cuba	178.151
Duet	United States (USA); Karen Josephson; Sarah Josephson	192.117	Canada (CAN); Karen Fonteyne; Karn Sribney	183.450	Mexico (MEX); Lourdes Candini; Susana Candini	177.517
Team	United States (USA); Kristen Babb; Tracie Ruiz Conforto; Lori Hatch; Karen Josephson; Sarah Josephson; Tracy Long; Lisa Riddell; Michelle Svitenko; Karen Madsen; Susan Reed	190.598	Canada (CAN)	183.777	Mexico (MEX)	174.858
