= Cari Read =

Canadian synchronized swimmer

Personal information
- Nationality: Canadian
- Born: September 4, 1970 (age 55)

Sport
- Sport: Synchronized swimming
Medal record
Representing Canada
Women's synchronized swimming
Olympic Games
Silver medal – second place	1996 Atlanta	Team
World Aquatics Championships
Silver medal – second place	1991 Perth	Team
Silver medal – second place	1994 Rome	Team
Pan American Games
Silver medal – second place	1995 Mar del Plata	Team

Cari Read (born September 4, 1970) is a Canadian synchronized swimmer.

Read was a member of the successful Canadian synchronized swimming team that won silver medals at the 1991 World Aquatics Championships, the 1994 World Aquatics Championships and the 1995 Pan American Games, before going on to earn a silver medal in synchronized team at the 1996 Summer Olympics in Atlanta.
