= Margot Thien =

American synchronized swimmer (born 1971)

Personal information
- Born: December 29, 1971 (age 54) San Diego, California, U.S.
- Height: 167 cm (5 ft 6 in)
- Weight: 55 kg (121 lb)

Sport
- Sport: Synchronized Swimming
- College team: U. Cal Berkeley; Trained with Aquanuts
- Club: Sweetwater Dolphins (San Diego); Walnut Creek Aquanuts
- Coached by: Gail Emery (Aquanuts)
Medal record
Synchronized swimming
Representing the United States
Olympic Games
Gold medal – first place	1996 Atlanta	Team
World Championships
Gold medal – first place	1994 Rome	Team

Margot A. Thien (born December 29, 1971, in San Diego, California) is a former American competitor in synchronized swimming and an Olympic champion.

Thien was born December 29, 1971 in San Diego, California and initially trained and competed with San Diego's Sweetwater Dolphins where she was paired with Kindahl Hunter in Duet competition in May, 1985. Thien trained and competed for the Walnut Creek Aquanuts under Coach Gail Emery, who were likely her greatest influence in leading her to an Olympic gold championship. Emery was named to the International Women Sports Hall of Fame in 1997, coached the Walnut Creek Aquanuts to consecutive national championships, was a three time Olympic coach for synchronized swimming, having also coached Thien at the 1996 Olympics. In July, 1987, she swam in the solo and team competition at the U.S. Olympic Festival in Chapel Hill, North Carolina. Swimming for the Aquanuts at 17, Thien placed fifth with Nathalie Schneyder Bartleson in duet competition at the U.S. Synchronized Championships in April, 1989. In 1993, Thien placed third in duet competition with Walnut Creek teammate Nathalie Schneyder at the U.S. National Swimming Championships in Fort Lauderdale, Florida.

Continuing to train with the Aquanuts, Thien attended the University of California Berkeley, as had fellow 1996 American team Olympic gold medalist Jill Savery. At Berkeley, Thien majored in Exercise Physiology.

== 1996 Atlanta gold medalist ==
She was part of the American team that received a gold medal in synchronized swimming at the 1996 Summer Olympics in Atlanta. The 1996 Olympic team championship in Synchronized swimming was awarded with United States taking gold, Canada taking the silver, and Japan taking the bronze, which was the same order for the team event at the 1994 World Championships. At the Athens Olympics she was coached by her Walnut Creek Coach Gail Emery, as well as Coach Chris Carver from the Santa Clara Aquamaids, an exceptional program. Jill performed the routine "Patriotic" and "Symphony" with other Walnut Creek Aquanut synchronized swimmers that in addition to Thien included Heather Pease Olsen, Tammy Cleland McGregor, and Nathalie Schneyder Bartleson. Their routine, which was given 10's was considered nearly perfect by several judges, and received a standing ovation from the audience.

Demonstrating her abilities in blending with teams in group competition, in the group event she captured first place medals at the 1995 Pan American Games, and the 1994 World Championships.
