= Akiko Kawase =

Akiko Kawase may refer to:

- Akiko Kawase (actress) (born 1980), Japanese voice actor
- Akiko Kawase (synchronised swimmer) (born 1971), Japanese former synchronized swimmer
