= Jill Savery =

American synchronized swimmer (born 1972)

Personal information
- Born: May 2, 1972 (age 54) Fort Lauderdale, Florida, U.S.
- Occupation: Sustainability Consultant
- Height: 63 in (160 cm)
- Weight: 52 kg (115 lb)

Sport
- Sport: Synchronized Swimming
- College team: U. Cal Berkeley (1995); Trained with Aquanuts
- Club: Walnut Creek Aquanuts
- Coached by: Gail Emery (Walnut Creek)
Medal record
Synchronised swimming
Representing the United States
Olympic Games
Gold medal – first place	1996 Atlanta	Team
World Championships
Gold medal – first place	1994 Rome	Team

Jill Savery (born May 2, 1972) was an American competitor in synchronised swimming and a 1996 Athens Olympic champion in synchronized swimming in the team event.

Jill Savery was born in Fort Lauderdale, Florida on May 2, 1972, though she lived her early life in Concord, California. As a multi-sport athlete, she participated in gymnastics, diving, swimming, ballet, and baseball during her high school years. Betsy, Jill's mother, had been a synchronized swimmer in High School as was Jill's older sister Laura. Jill focused her athletic pursuits to synchronized swimming by the age of ten, and soon began competing with Hall of Fame Coach Gail Emery where at sixteen, she won the Championship for the Junior World Team.

== Walnut Creek Aquanuts ==
Prior to college, Savery swam for the Walnut Creek Aquanuts in Walnut Creek California, primarily under Coach Gail Emery. In the 1989 U.S. Synchronized Swimming championships, Savery placed ninth in the solo semi-finals swimming for Walnut Creek, helping to lead the team to a first place standing in the team semi-finals. In July 1990, she was selected to compete in the America Cup in Irvine California's Heritage Park Aquatics Complex in early August. The America Cup was the only international meet for synchronized swimming held in the United States at the time. In America Cup competition, she was a champion in the team event, as well as solo and duet events. Coach Emery and the Aquanuts may have been Savery's greatest influence in coaching her to an Olympic gold championship. Emery was named to the International Women Sports Hall of Fame in 1997, coached the Walnut Creek Aquanuts to consecutive national championships, was a three-time Olympic coach for synchronized swimming, and coached the Aquanuts team for close to fifty years. Out of 24 finalists in May 1995, she received the highest score of 46.947 points to qualify for the U.S. National Team, finishing ahead of Becky Dyroen-Lancer of the Santa Clara Aquamaids

== University of California Berkeley ==
In 1995, Savery was a University of California Berkeley graduate, having majored in Political Science. Continuing to compete in synchronized swimming while at Berkeley, she scored the most points in individual competition at the NCAA National Championships, though it is not clear if Berkeley had an official team at the time. While at Cal, she helped students with handicaps take notes. She later completed a master's degree in environmental management from Yale University. During her Berkeley years, from 1991 through 1995, she was part of team event gold medals in Open competitions in Rome, France and Switzerland, as well as the World Cup and Pan Pacific championships. From 1991-1995, Emery won ten medals in U.S. National championships including two gold medals.

== 1996 Atlanta gold medal ==
On October 14, 1905, qualifying for the U.S. team after four days of synchronized swimming try-outs at the U.S. Olympic trial in Indianapolis, with 97.868 points, Savery was second to American team member Becky Dryoen Lancer who had 98.708 points. Ten synchronized swimmers qualified for the team.

Savery competed for the American team that won a gold medal in the team event at the 1996 Summer Olympics in Atlanta, the first Olympics that included the team event in synchronized swimming, though the Solo, duet, and figures competition were cut. The team championship was awarded with United States taking gold, Canada taking the silver, and Japan taking the bronze, which was the same order for the team event at the 1994 World Championships. At the Athens Olympics she was coached by her Walnut Creek Coach Gail Emery, as well as Coach Chris Carver from the Santa Clara Aquamaids, and exceptional program. Jill performed the routine "Patriotic" and "Symphony" with other Walnut Creek Aquanut synchronized swimmers that included Heather Pease Olsen, Tammy Cleland McGregor, Margot Thien, and Nathalie Schneyder Bartleson. Their routine, which was scored with 10's was considered nearly perfect by several judges, and received a standing ovation from the audience.

Savery competed with the U.S. National Team for ten years, including serving as team Captain in 1989, 1991, and 1994. She was a world champion in eight years and was the only synchronized swimmer to compete in every available international team competition.

In service to the synchronized swimming community, she was active on the United States Olympic Committee Advisory Board. At the 1998 Nagano Winter Olympic Games, she worked as a liaison to the athletes.

=== Post-swimming careers ===
Utilizing her graduate degree in environmental engineering, she began a career as a sustainability advisor and consultant. In 2008, she worked for PMC, an environmental consulting firm in California's Rancho Cordova. Sustainability consultants advise businesses on how they can operate in a manner that leaves the least negative impact on the environment. She headed sustainability for the 2013 America’s Cup event in 2013, and in a similar service was a consultant at the 2012 London Olympics. She taught an MBA course at the University of Nevada as part of their master's in business administration curriculum on how businesses could increase their commitment to becoming socially responsible.

=== Honors ===
In a rare honor in 2000, she was inducted into the International Swimming Hall of Fame.

== See also ==
- List of members of the International Swimming Hall of Fame
