= Heather Simmons =

Heather Simmons may refer to:

- Heather Simmons-Carrasco, American competitor in synchronized swimming
- Heather Simmons (politician), member of the New Jersey General Assembly
