= 1989 FINA Synchronised Swimming World Cup =

International synchronised swimming competition

The 4th FINA Synchronised Swimming World Cup was held September 7–9, 1989 in Paris, France. It featured swimmers from 10 nations, swimming in three events: Solo, Duet and Team.

== Participating nations ==
10 nations swam at the 1989 Synchro World Cup:

- Canada
- France
- Federal Republic of Germany
- Great Britain
- Japan
- Netherlands
- Mexico
- Soviet Union
- Switzerland
- United States

== Results ==
Event	Gold		Silver		Bronze	
Solo details	Tracy Long; United States	192.64	Sylvie Fréchette; Canada	192.40	Mikako Kotani; Japan	191.76
Duet details	Tracy Long; Michele Svitenko; United States	191.03	Mikako Kotani; Aki Takayama; Japan	190.03	Sylvie Fréchette; Nathalie Guay; Canada	189.45
Team details	Canada	189.900	United States	187.716	Japan	184.722

== Point standings ==
Place	Nation	Total
1	United States	63
2	Canada	47
3	Soviet Union	44
4	Japan	32
5	France	31
6	Switzerland	19
7	(United Kingdom) Great Britain	8
8	Netherlands	8
9	Mexico	6
10	(West Germany) Federal Republic of Germany	1

== Medal table ==
Rank	Nation	Gold	Silver	Bronze	Total
1	United States	2	1	0	3
2	Canada	1	1	1	3
3	Japan	0	1	2	3
Totals (3 entries)		3	3	3	9
