= Synchronized swimming at the 1998 Asian Games – Women's duet =

Women's duet at the 1998 Asian Games
- Venue: Thammasat Aquatic Center
- Dates: 14–15 December 1998
- Competitors: 12 from 6 nations

Medalists
gold medal	Miya Tachibana; Miho Takeda	Japan
silver medal	Jang Yoon-kyeong; Yoo Na-mi	South Korea
bronze medal	Li Min; Long Yan	China

The women's duet synchronized swimming competition at the 1998 Asian Games in Bangkok was held on 14 December and 15 December at the Thammasat Aquatic Center.

== Schedule ==
All times are Indochina Time (UTC+07:00)

Date	Time	Event
Monday, 14 December 1998	12:00	Technical routine
Tuesday, 15 December 1998	17:00	Free routine

== Results ==
Rank	Team	Technical (35%)	Free (65%)	Total
1st place, gold medalist(s)	Japan (JPN); Miya Tachibana; Miho Takeda	34.230	63.960	98.190
2nd place, silver medalist(s)	South Korea (KOR); Jang Yoon-kyeong; Yoo Na-mi	33.670	62.834	96.504
3rd place, bronze medalist(s)	China (CHN); Li Min; Long Yan	33.413	62.530	95.943
4	Kazakhstan (KAZ); Aliya Karimova; Galina Shatnaya	30.077	56.810	86.887
5	Uzbekistan (UZB); Marina Abrashkina; Olga Bistrova	29.587	55.206	84.793
6	Thailand (THA); Katesaya Kaewsrimuang; Augkana Roysuwan	25.527	49.010	74.537
