= Miho Kawabe =

Japanese synchronized swimmer

Personal information
- Born: July 2, 1974 (age 51) Ibaraki Prefecture, Japan

Sport
- Sport: Synchronised swimming
Medal record
Representing Japan
Olympic Games
Bronze medal – third place	1996 Atlanta	Team
World Championships
Silver medal – second place	1998 Perth	Team

Miho Kawabe (河邉 美穂, Kawabe Miho; born 2 July 1974) is a Japanese former synchronized swimmer who competed in the 1996 Summer Olympics.
