= Junko Tanaka =

Japanese synchronized swimmer

Personal information
- Born: October 9, 1973 (age 52) Shizuoka Prefecture, Japan

Sport
- Sport: Synchronised swimming
Medal record
Representing Japan
Olympic Games
Bronze medal – third place	1996 Atlanta	Team

Junko Tanaka (田中 順子, Tanaka Junko; born 9 October 1973) is a Japanese former synchronized swimmer who competed in the 1996 Summer Olympics.
