= Olivia González =

Mexican synchronized swimmer

Personal information
- Born: October 14, 1978 (age 47)

Sport
- Sport: Swimming
Medal record
Representing Mexico
Pan American Games
Bronze medal – third place	1995 Mar del Plata	Team

Olivia González (born 25 May 1971) is a Mexican former synchronized swimmer who competed in the 1996 Summer Olympics.
