= Karen Clark (synchronized swimmer) =

Canadian synchronized swimmer

Personal information
- Full name: Karen Lynn Clark
- Born: April 9, 1972 (age 54) Montreal, Quebec

Sport
- Sport: Swimming
- Strokes: Synchronized swimming
Medal record
Women's synchronized swimming
Representing Canada
Olympic Games
Silver medal – second place	1996 Atlanta	Team
World Aquatics Championships
Silver medal – second place	1991 Perth	Team
Silver medal – second place	1994 Rome	Team
Pan American Games
Silver medal – second place	1995 Mar del Plata	Solo
Silver medal – second place	1995 Mar del Plata	Team

Karen Lynn Clark (born April 9, 1972) is a Canadian Olympic medalist and former synchronized swimmer.

== Career ==
Clark began synchronized swimming at age six. She won three silver medals in solo, duet and team at 1989 FINA World Junior Synchronised Swimming Championships As a member of Team Canada she would win silver in the team events at the 1991 World Aquatics Championships and 1994 World Aquatics Championships. She won a silver medal in the solo event at the 1995 Pan American Games. Her most notable achievement was winning a silver medal at the 1996 Summer Olympics in Atlanta with the Canadian team.

== Honours ==
Clark was inducted into the Mississauga Sports Hall of Fame in 2004.
