= Sarah Josephson =

American synchronized swimmer

Personal information
- Full name: Sarah Gay Josephson
- Born: January 10, 1964 (age 62) Bristol, Connecticut, U.S.
- Height: 5 ft 4 in (163 cm)
- Weight: 55 kg (121 lb)

Sport
- Country: United States
- Sport: Synchronized swimming
- Event(s): Duet, Solo, Team
- College team: Ohio State Buckeyes (OSU)
- Club: Spindrifts Synchro Team (Bristol, CT); Hamden Heronettes (Hamden, CT); Walnut Creek Aquanuts (Walnut Creek, CA)
- Coached by: Susan BeVier (Spindrifts); Linda Lichter (Heronettes, US Team); Mary Jo Ruggieri (Ohio State); Gail Emery (Aquanuts, Olympics)
Medal record
Olympic Games
| Gold medal – first place | 1992 Barcelona | Duet |
| Silver medal – second place | 1988 Seoul | Duet |
World Championships
| Gold medal – first place | 1991 Perth | Duet |
| Gold medal – first place | 1991 Perth | Team |
| Silver medal – second place | 1986 Madrid | Solo |
| Silver medal – second place | 1986 Madrid | Duet |
| Silver medal – second place | 1986 Madrid | Team |
Pan American Games
| Gold medal – first place | 1987 Indianapolis | Duet |
| Gold medal – first place | 1987 Indianapolis | Team |

Sarah Gay Josephson (born January 10, 1964) was a competitor in synchronized swimming, who competed for Ohio State University and was an American 1992 Barcelona Olympic champion in duet competition. A member of the International Swimming Hall of Fame, at the 1988 Seoul Olympics, Josephson won a silver medal in duet competition. In collegiate competition, she was nearly undefeated competing with her sister Karen in duet competition,

== Early life ==
Sarah Josephson was born January 10, 1964, in Bristol, Connecticut. She and her sister Karen began competing by the age of six with local clubs, and first trained in synchronized swimming at Bristol's Girl's Club, later training with the Spindrifts Synchro team beginning around 1977, as part of the Rocky Hill School of Swimming. As High School Sophomores at Bristol Central High School, the sister's mother Beryl P. Josephson, who worked as a teacher at Bristol High, drove both daughters twenty miles to practice with the Spindrifts after school, where training averaged three hours per day. With the Spindrifts team, Sarah and Karen were coached by Susan BeVier.

To increase the quality of their training, in September 1979, the sisters left Bristol High and moved to Hamden, Connecticut to train with the Hamden Heronettes and attend Hamden High School, while living with an Aunt. Sarah's sister Jennifer was also a synchronized swimmer and competed for the Hamden Heronettes. While in Hamden, by 1980, Sarah and Karen were coached by Linda Lichter, a founder of the Hamden Heronettes, a U.S. National team coach and an Assistant Coach at Yale. Years later, Lichter would become an able successor to Dr. Mary Jo Ruggieri as a Hall of Fame synchro team Head Coach at Ohio State. Sarah graduated Hamden High around 1981.

Competing for the Spindrifts, Sarah and her sister Karen won a gold medal at the National AAU Junior Olympics in Lincoln, Nebraska on August 12, 1979.

== Ohio State University ==
Sarah and Karen enrolled at Ohio State University in the fall of 1981 and competed on the synchronized swimming team under head coach Mary Jo Ruggieri from 1982 to 1985. During her time at Ohio State, Sarah earned All-American honors four times and studied genetics, graduating with honors in 1985 with a 3.5 grade point average. Ruggieri coached the Ohio State team from 1970 to 1995, during which the program won 17 of the 19 collegiate national championships in which it competed. Sarah and Karen were members of teams that won national championships during their tenure at the university.

Beginning around 1979, Sarah and Karen spent twelve years on the U.S. National Synchronized swimming team. After graduating college in 1985, the sisters moved to Walnut Creek, California to train with Gail Emery and the U.S. National Team. After college, they swam for a period with Emery's Walnut Creek Aquanuts team in Walnut Creek.

== Olympics 1984-1992 ==
Sarah Josephson competed in the women's solo event at the 1984 Summer Olympics in Los Angeles. She partnered with her twin sister Karen Josephson to win a silver medal in the women's duet at the 1988 Summer Olympics in Seoul and then a gold medal in the same event with at the 1992 Summer Olympics in Barcelona.

Sarah and, and her sister Karen were American Synchronized Swimming Champions in Duet competition seven times.

=== International competition highlights ===
Sarah competing both alone and with her sister, had a record of achievement in international synchronized swimming competition. Sarah won silver medals in the solo, duet, and team events at the 1986 World Championships in Madrid. At the 1991 World Championships in Perth she won gold medals in the duet and team events.

Josephson also competed at the 1987 Pan American Game in Indianapolis, winning gold medals in duet and team events.

Competing with her sister Karen, the two captured gold medals at the 1991 Pan Pacific Championships, and the World Cups in 1991.

Sarah and Karen retired from elite synchronized swimming not long after the 1992 Olympics.

=== Honors ===
A United States Synchronized Swimming Inc. (USSSI) National Solo Champion twice, Josephson received the Western Conference Medal of Honor during her collegiate years. Josephson was Athlete of the year for Ohio State for women in 1984, and College Athlete of the year for the USSSI. Highly recognized in the sport of Synchronized Swimming, in 1993, Sarah was admitted to The Ohio State University Athletic Hall of Fame, and in 1997 to the International Swimming Hall of Fame in Fort Lauderdale. In a rare honor, Sarah and sister Karen were only one of two Synchronized Swimming duet teams to become members of the International Swimming Hall of Fame. Sarah and Karen were AAU Sullivan Award finalists, and became members of Connecticut's Bristol Sports Hall of Fame in 1997.

== See also ==
- List of members of the International Swimming Hall of Fame
