= Kasia Kulesza =

Canadian synchronized swimmer

Personal information
- Born: August 29, 1976 (age 49) Warsaw, Poland

Sport
- Sport: Swimming
- Strokes: Synchronised swimming
Medal record
Women's Synchronised swimming
Representing Canada
Olympic Games
Silver medal – second place	1996 Atlanta	Team
Pan American Games
Silver medal – second place	1995 Mar del Plata	Team
Commonwealth Games
Gold medal – first place	1998 Kuala Lumpur	Duet

Kasia Kulesza (born August 29, 1976 in Warsaw) is a Canadian competitor in synchronised swimming and Olympic medalist.

She participated on the Canadian team that received a silver medal in synchronized team at the 1996 Summer Olympics in Atlanta.

She received a gold medal in duet with Jacinthe Taillon at the 1998 Commonwealth Games in Kuala Lumpur.
