= Artistic swimming at the 2028 Summer Olympics =

Artistic swimming at the Games of the XXXIV Olympiad
- Venue: Long Beach Aquatics Center; Long Beach, California
- Dates: 25–29 July 2028
- No. of events: 2 (1 women, 1 mixed)
- Competitors: 96 from 18 nations

Artistic swimming (formerly called synchronized swimming) competitions at the 2028 Summer Olympics in Los Angeles, California, United States, are scheduled to be held in the Long Beach Aquatics Center.

Several significant changes were instituted in the artistic swimming program for the previous Paris 2024 Summer Olympics to reinforce the Games-wide effort to achieve gender equality and vast diversity among the nations in the qualifying process. On October 7, 2022, World Aquatics (then FINA) favored nearly 99 percent of the votes to amend the artistic swimming rules between 2022 and 2025, such as the composition of an eight-member mixed team (previously a women's team event) with a maximum number of two males in the team.

== Qualification ==
=== Qualification summary ===
Nation	Team	Duet	Athletes
United States	Yes	Yes	8
Total: 18 NOCs	80	16	96

== Participating nations ==
- United States (8)

== Competition schedule ==
All times use Pacific Time (PT) (UTC–7)

Day	Date	Start	Finish	Event	Phase
Day 11	Tuesday 25 July 2028	11:00	13:00	Duet	Technical routine
Day 12	Wednesday 26 July 2028	11:00	13:15	Duet	Free routine
Day 13	Thursday 27 July 2028	11:00	12:30	Team	Technical routine
Day 14	Friday 28 July 2028	11:00	12:30	Team	Free routine
Day 15	Saturday 29 July 2028	10:45	12:30	Team	Acrobatic routine
