= Heather Pease =

American synchronized swimmer (born 1975)

Personal information
- Full name: Heather M. Pease-Olson
- National team: United States
- Born: September 29, 1975 (age 51) Monterey, California
- Occupations: Coaching Synchro; Stanford (2001-12)
- Height: 1.77 m (5 ft 10 in)
- Weight: 59 kg (130 lb)
- Spouse: Erik Olson

Sport
- Sport: Synchronized swimming
- College team: Stanford University (1999)
- Club: Cypress Swim Club; Walnut Creek Aquanuts
- Coached by: Don Squire (Cypress SC); Gail Emery (Walnut Creek)
Medal record
Women's synchronized swimming
Representing the United States
Olympic Games
Gold medal – first place	1996 Atlanta	Team

Heather Pease (born September 29, 1975), known as Heather Pease-Olson since 2003, is an American former synchronized swimmer who competed for Stanford University and was an Olympic champion in synchronized team competition at the Atlanta Olympics in 1996. She participated in the Sydney Olympic synchronized team event in 2000, where the U.S. placed fifth. After her competitive career, she coached synchronized swimming for Stanford, where she led the team to four NCAA championships by 2012.

== Early life and competition ==
Pease was born in Monterey, California on September 29, 1975, the youngest of several siblings to Sarah and Douglas Pease. After a family move, she attended the Stevenson School a private school in Pebble Beach, California, graduating in 1993. She lived in the greater Carmel Valley area during most of her High School years where she swam for the Cypress Swim Club's Synchronized swimming squad under Coach Don Squire. Swimming for the Cypress Club at only 14, Pease was America's youngest synchronized swimmer selected to be part of the West Zone squad that would compete at the Olympic Sports Festival in Minneapolis, Minnesota in early July 1990. In February 1992, she briefly competed with her duet partner Desiree Castro as her Coach, but continued to achieve in competition qualifying for and performing well at the Junior National Championships at Florida State.

After recognizing the need for an elite program and coach in her Senior year in High School, Savery began training and competing with the Walnut Creek Aquanuts beginning around 1993–1995, in Walnut Creek California, under the guidance of Head Coach Gail Emery. Heather lived with her sister Robin Travernik after moving to Walnut Creek to train with the Aquanuts.

== St. Marys and Stanford University ==
Pease spent two years studying at Moraga, California's St. Mary's, roughly between 1993 and 1995, while majoring in English, where she could continue to train with the Walnut Creek Aquanuts, around eight miles Northeast of the school. Coach Emery and the Aquanuts were likely one of Pease's primary influences paving her way to an Olympic gold medal championship. Emery was named to the International Women Sports Hall of Fame in 1997, coached the Walnut Creek Aquanuts to consecutive national championships, and was a three time U.S. Olympic coach for synchronized swimming, serving as an Olympic coach to Pease.

Transferring from St. Mary's, she competed for Stanford University in Palo Alto, where in 1997 she captured solo, trio, and figures in NCAA competition. She also captured titles in solo, duet, trio, and figures competition in 1998, and was honored as a collegiate All American in both 1997 and 1998. In 1998, she helped bring Stanford to their first NCAA national championship in the sport of synchronized swimming. She graduated Stanford in 1999 with a major in English.

== 1996 Atlanta Olympic gold ==
Heather was a member of the American team that won a gold medal in team event at the 1996 Summer Olympics in Atlanta. At the Atlanta Olympics, Heather performed the routine "Patriotic" and "Symphony" with other Walnut Creek Aquanut synchronized swimmers that included Jill Savery, Tammy Cleland McGregor, Margot Thien, and Nathalie Schneyder Bartleson. Their routine, which received 10's was considered nearly perfect by several judges, and received a standing ovation from the audience.

== 2000 Sydney Olympics ==
As team Captain, she competed again in the Synchronized swimming team event four years later at the 2000 Sydney Olympics, finishing in fifth position. The order of finish that year in the team competition was Russia with the gold, Japan with the silver, Canada with the bronze, and then France and the United States. Russia had not formerly placed in the Olympic team event which had begun in 1996, but they would dominate the team competition in the following Olympics as well.

She married husband Erik Olson around 2003, and they had two sons, beginning in 2013. She continued to coach age group swimming in 2018, in the 13-15 age group.

=== Coaching ===
After retiring from her synchronized swimming career around 2000, Pease-Olson assistant coached and then served as Stanford's head synchronized swimming coach, where she led the team to four NCAA championships during her coaching tenure from 2001 to 2012. She led the team to a runner-up title in five other years.

=== Honors ===
In tribute to her exceptional and groundbreaking achievements as both a competitor and coach, she was inducted into the Stanford University Hall of Fame in October, 2014.
