= Raika Fujii =

Japanese synchronized swimmer

Personal information
- Born: July 5, 1974 (age 51) Kyoto Prefecture, Japan

Sport
- Sport: Synchronised swimming
Medal record
Representing Japan
Olympic Games
Silver medal – second place	2000 Sydney	Team
Bronze medal – third place	1996 Atlanta	Team
World Championships
Silver medal – second place	1998 Perth	Team
Bronze medal – third place	1994 Rome	Team

Raika Fujii (born 5 July 1974) is a Japanese former synchronized swimmer who competed in the 1996 Summer Olympics and in the 2000 Summer Olympics.
