= Berenice Guzmán =

Mexican synchronized swimmer

Personal information
- Born: August 8, 1975 (age 50)

Sport
- Sport: Swimming
Medal record
Representing Mexico
Pan American Games
Bronze medal – third place	1995 Mar del Plata	Team
Bronze medal – third place	1999 Winnipeg	Team

Berenice Guzmán Cano (born 8 August 1975) is a Mexican former synchronized swimmer who competed in the 1996 Summer Olympics.
