= Ingrid Reich =

Mexican synchronized swimmer

Personal information
- Born: June 12, 1973 (age 53)

Sport
- Sport: Synchronised swimming
Medal record
Representing Mexico
Pan American Games
Bronze medal – third place	1995 Mar del Plata	Team
Central American and Caribbean Games
Gold medal – first place	1993 Ponce	Team

Íngrid Reich Rincón (born 12 June 1973) is a Mexican former synchronized swimmer who competed in the 1996 Summer Olympics. She is the sister of Aline Reich.
