= Mayuko Fujiki =

Spanish synchronized swimming coach

Mayuko Fujiki 藤木 麻祐子
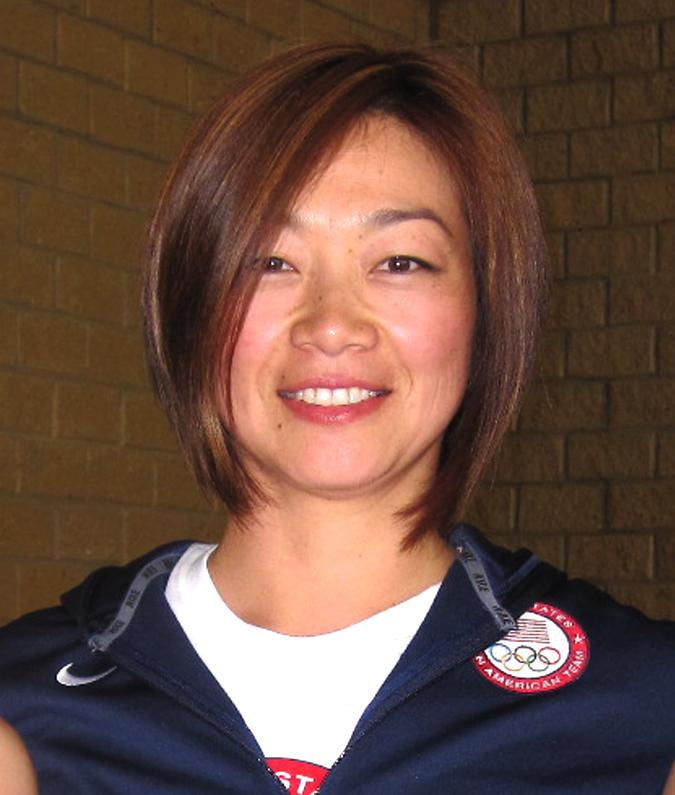
- Mayuko Fujiki in 2011

Personal information
- Full name: Mayuko Fujiki
- National team: Spain, China, USA, Japan

Sport
- Sport: Swimming
- Strokes: Synchronized swimming
Medal record
Women's Synchronized swimming
Representing Spain, China, United States, Japan Olympic Games
Bronze medal – third place	2024 Paris Olympics	Team ESP
Silver medal – second place	2016 Rio Olympics	Team CHN
Silver medal – second place	2016 Rio Olympics	Duet CHN
Silver medal – second place	2004 Athens Olympics	Team JPN
Silver medal – second place	2004 Athens Olympics	Duet JPN
Event	1st	2nd	3rd
Olympic Games	0	5	1
World Championships (LC)	3	10	15
World Cup	2	0	0
European Games	3	0	0
Asian Games	2	0	0
Pan American Games	0	2	0
Total	10	17	16

Mayuko Fujiki (藤木 麻祐子, Fujiki Mayuko; born June 21, 1975) is an international artistic swimming coach originally from Japan, who has competed over seven Olympic Games as an athlete, and has served as the head coach for the national teams of Spain, China, and the United States. Leveraging her success at Paris 2024, she transitioned to a new role as an international High-performance Consultant.

== Early career as a swimmer ==
Due to the influence of her parents, who were both avid swimmers, Fujiki learned swimming at an early age. When she was seven years old, she began attending a swimming school in Osaka and started to learn artistic swimming. When she was 14 years old, she won the Japanese National Junior Olympic and was selected to represent Japan at the Junior World Championships.

In 1992, Fujiki moved to the United States and attended the Las Lomas High School in Walnut Creek, California. While she was in Walnut Creek, she joined the Walnut Creek Aquanuts, which was regarded as one of the best artistic swimming teams in the world at that time. At Aquanuts, she was trained by coaches such as Gail Pucci, a world champion herself, whose creativity and the skill as a coach has been teaching how to be a teacher for the athletes. Fujiki also sought guidance from Santa Clara Aquamaide's Chris Caver, who remains as a close confidant and mentor to Fujiki since she retired from swimming and began coaching. The mentorship and guidance by these seasoned veterans continue to support Fujiki navigating her career to this day.

While at Aquanuts, she met her future teammates and notable synchronized swimmers such as Tamara Crow DeClercq and Heather Pease Olsen. In 1993, she won the solo-preliminary category at the U.S. Open artistic swimming Championships in Irvine, CA. After successfully completing her junior year at the Las Lomas High School, Fujiki returned to Japan in 1993. After completing high school in Japan, she moved to Tokyo to attend the Nihon University, where she studied English Literature and specialized in Intercultural Communications. While she was at Nihon University, she joined the Tokyo artistic swimming Club.

In 1995, she was selected to be part of the Japanese National Team for the 1996 World Cup. Then in 1996, she was selected to be one of the swimmers to represent Japan in the Atlanta Olympics. There were only team events at the Atlanta Olympics and Fujiki's team won a bronze medal.

In 1997, as part of the Japanese National Team, she participated in a Duet event and won another bronze medal in the Swiss Open Championships. In 1998, Fujiki moved back to California to join the Walnut Creek Aquanuts again and took part in the US National Championships and US Open in 2000. She was also one of the eight American swimmers that performed in the Rome and Spain Opens in 1999 and 2000, respectively.

In 2000, she retired from swimming and began coaching in 2001 at Walnut Creek Aquanuts.

== Coaching career ==
Before 2010 Between 2003 and 2010, she worked as a coach for the Spanish National Team. She trained some of the most notable synchronized swimmers of that time, including Gemma Mengual, Paola Tirados and Andrea Fuentes. Spanish Team had a series of breakthrough victories under Fujiki's coaching, frequently competing for the top three medals with Russia, Japan and US. Fujiki led the team to win three medals in 2003 Barcelona World Championships (the first time for Spain to win a medal in World Championships), 2005 Montreal, and 2007 Melbourne World Championships.

In 2008 at the Beijing Olympics, her team won its first silver medal.

Leading US National Team (2010-2014) From 2010, she served as the head coach for the US national team, which competed in the duet at the finals in London Olympics.

In 2011, she was the head coach of the US National team that competed at the Pan American Games held in Mexico City.

Leading Chinese National Team (2014-2017) In 2014, she became the head coach of the Chinese national team. The Chinese team at that time was thriving but remained outside of the mainstream artistic swimming paradigm. Fujiki introduced a new approach and concept and she led the Chinese national team to earn the highest score in its history, resulting in both team and duet winning the silver medals.

Leading Spanish National Team (2017- current) In 2017, the Spanish Federation announced Fujiki's appointment as the head coach of the Spanish National Team. This announcement came during a period where the Spanish National Team had experienced a decline in scores, costing the team qualification to the Rio 2016 Olympic Games. Fujiki entered the position with hopes to bring "a different approach to show the unique ‘Spanish’ synchro" and "to build fundamental techniques in individual swimmers" with a new generation of swimmers.

In less than two years after being appointed as the head coach of the Spanish National Team, Fujiki led a team of young swimmers to earn a bronze medal in the newly established Highlight category in 2019 at the FINA World Championship. This feat marked the end of the "dark period" of the Spanish Team of not earning any medals in two consecutive world championships.

Ona Carbonell, FINA's most decorated female swimmer, stated that athletes training under Fujiki trusted her coaching. Carbonell also stated that Fujiki's expertise includes the artistic, technical, and planning aspects of artistic swimming.

For the Tokyo 2020 Olympics, Fujiki, representing Spain, choreographed unique routines that celebrated Japanese culture. The team's theme for one routine, "Baseball," honored the host country's most beloved sport and included music that featured Japanese baseball legends such as Ichiro, Shohei Ohtani, and Hideki Matsui.

Another routine, themed around "Darwin's Theory of Evolution," was also innovative. The most notable performance in this series uniquely combined Japanese music, flamenco, and Japanese sign language to create a powerful and inclusive message.

At the 2023 Fukuoka World Championships, Fujiki made history for Spanish artistic swimming by securing a gold medal in the Olympic Team event. This was the most significant achievement ever for the Spanish team. Overall, Spain won a total of seven medals during the championship.

At the 2024 Paris Olympics, Fujiki's leadership brought Spain back to the medal podium after a twelve-year absence. For the duet of Iris Tió and Alisa Ozhogina, she created a routine with the theme of "Sagrada Família." For the team event, she choreographed a routine that was a fusion of music, including "Mambo" from West Side Story by composer Gustavo Dudamel, Eminem's "Lose Yourself," and "O Fortuna" from Carmina Burana. The team's routine won Spain its long-awaited Olympic medal. In 2018, Fujiki recognized the exceptional potential of a then-16-year-old IRIS Tio and recruited her to the national team. Though she was known more for her physicality than her expressive ability at the time, Fujiki personally coached her. He not only selected Tio, the team's youngest athlete, as a duet member for the Tokyo Olympics but also focused on developing her artistry as a soloist, helping her become one of the world's top performers in the sport.

== Diversity and Inclusion in Artistic Swimming ==
=== Inclusion of boys and men ===
Fujiki was one of the first Olympic-level coaches in Spain to train male-presenting and/or male-identifying swimmers in artistic swimming. Prior to 2017, there was no systematic effort in Spain to include male-identifying and/or male-presenting swimmers at the regional or national level in artistic swimming. Boys and men interested in the sport had limited opportunities, restricted to joining local teams and participating only at the local level. Recognizing this gap, Fujiki took the initiative to make artistic swimming more inclusive and championed the development of artistic swimming for boys in Spain.

In December 2017, Fujiki invited Bill May, widely regarded as a trailblazer for men and boys in artistic swimming, to lead Spain’s first-ever boys’ swimmer camp at the Centre d'Alt Rendiment (C.A.R.). The camp brought together male-identifying and male-presenting swimmers from across the country to train under May’s guidance.

=== Inclusion of new mothers as top level athletes ===
In addition to promoting the inclusion of male-identifying and male-presenting swimmers in artistic swimming, Fujiki further pushed gender boundaries by developing training schedules that accommodate lactating mothers. When Ona Carbonell, a key member of the Spanish national team, gave birth in August 2020—just eleven months before the Tokyo Olympics—conventional wisdom did not consider recently postpartum or lactating mothers as competitive athletes. However, Fujiki devised an innovative training approach that went beyond merely accommodating breastfeeding times.

Rather than allowing breastfeeding to disrupt team practice, Fujiki provided emotional support and designed a training schedule that aligned with Carbonell’s breastfeeding rhythm and accounted for the physical and hormonal changes she was experiencing. This holistic approach enabled Carbonell to endure the rigorous training regimen and successfully compete in the Tokyo Olympics.

== Choreography ==
Fujiki received high accolades for her choreography, music selection and production. She has been invited by national teams in Australia, Greece, Hungary, the Hunan Province, and Colombia as a choreographer. Ona Carbonell, who is recognized as the most decorated female swimmer by FINA, credits Fujiki's routine for earning the 2019 World Championship medal. In this routine, Fujiki used only the speech of Nelson Mandela about how sports unite people instead of relying on conventional music as an accompaniment to the performance.

== High Performance Advisor ==
Since 2025, Fujiki has begun focusing on global performance advising consulting around the world. https://www.israelhayom.co.il/sport/other-sports/article/17672632

== Speakers ==
Fujiki has been involved in the FINA's effort to promote artistic swimming globally, and served as a lecturer at FINA's promotional program called FINA Development Clinic, which is part of the Olympic Solidarity Program, in Argentina, New Zealand, Cuba and Panama.

== Other episodes ==
She was selected as Newsweek Japan's 100 Japanese Respected by the World (世界で尊敬される日本人100人).

When the Spanish team won the first silver medal at the 2008 Beijing Olympics, the Spanish media recognized Fujiki as the catalyst who not only helped the team to excel, but also revolutionized Spanish training style.

After Fujiki left the Spain team in 2013, one of the swimmers commented to the local newspaper how Fujiki's departure meant the end of artistic swimming in her.

Sun Wenyan, who was trained by both Fujiki and another Japanese coach, Masayo Imura, was asked the difference between the two coaches. Sun explained that while Imura places an emphasis on technique, Fujiki focuses on the artistic expression. The goal of practice under Fujiki's coaching is not for the sake of practicing, but for the swimmers to be able to express their emotions fully during the competition.
