= Patricia Vila =

Mexican synchronized swimmer

Personal information
- Born: January 20, 1972 (age 54)

Sport
- Sport: Synchronised swimming
Medal record
Representing Mexico
Pan American Games
| Bronze medal – third place | 1995 Mar del Plata | Team |
Central American and Caribbean Games
| Gold medal – first place | 1990 Mexico City | Team |
| Gold medal – first place | 1993 Ponce | Team |

Norma Patricia Vila Islas (born 20 January 1972) is a Mexican former synchronized swimmer who competed in the 1996 Summer Olympics.
