= Karen Josephson =

American synchronized swimmer

Personal information
- Full name: Karen Julia Josephson
- Born: January 10, 1964 (age 62) Bristol, Connecticut, U.S.
- Height: 162 cm (5 ft 4 in)
- Weight: 55 kg (121 lb)

Sport
- Country: United States
- Sport: Synchronized swimming
- College team: Ohio State University
- Club: Spindrifts Synchro Team (Bristol, CT); Hamden Heronettes (Hamden, CT); Walnut Creek Aquanuts (Walnut Creek, CA)
- Coached by: Susan BeVier (Spindrifts); Linda Lichter (Heronettes); Dr. Mary Jo Ruggieri (OSU); Gail Emery, Linda Lichter (US Team)
Medal record
Olympic Games
Gold medal – first place	1992 Barcelona	Duet
Silver medal – second place	1988 Seoul	Duet
World Championships
Gold medal – first place	1991 Perth	Duet
Gold medal – first place	1991 Perth	Team
Silver medal – second place	1986 Madrid	Duet
Silver medal – second place	1986 Madrid	Team
Pan American Games
Gold medal – first place	1987 Indianapolis	Duet
Gold medal – first place	1987 Indianapolis	Team

Karen Julia Josephson (born January 10, 1964) is a former American synchronized swimmer who competed for Ohio State University and was a 1988 Olympic silver medalist and a 1992 Olympic gold medalist.

== Early life ==
Karen was born January 10, 1964 in Bristol, Connecticut. She and her sister Sarah began competing by the age of five and first trained in synchronized swimming at the Girl's Club of Bristol, later training for around two years beginning in 1977 with the Spindrifts Synchro team in greater Bristol, as part of the Rocky Hill School of Swimming. As High School Sophomores at Bristol Central High School, the sister's mother Beryl P. Josephson drove both daughters twenty miles to practice with the Spindrifts after school, where training averaged three hours per day. With the Spindrifts team, Sarah and Karen were coached by Susan BeVier.

To increase the quality of their training, in September 1979, the sisters left Bristol High and moved to Hamden, Connecticut to train with the Hamden Heronettes and attend Hamden High School, while living with an Aunt. While in Hamden, by 1980, Sarah and Karen were coached by Linda Lichter, a founder of the Heronettes, a U.S. National team coach and an Assistant Coach at Yale, who would later coach the Ohio State team. Karen's sister Jennifer was also a synchronized swimmer and competed for the Hamden Heronettes. An honors student in many semesters, Karen graduated Hamden High around 1981.

== Ohio State University ==
Enrolling around 1981, Josephson and her sister Sarah attended and competed in synchronized swimming for the strong program at Ohio State University from 1982-1985 under Head Coach Dr. Mary Jo Ruggieri. Karen's syncro coach, Dr. Ruggieri coached the Ohio State team from 1970-1995, leading them to 17 of the 19 National Championships for Collegiate synchronized swimming in which the team participated. In duet competition, Karen paired with sister Sarah earned nine NCAA national titles. Karen helped lead OSU to three national championships in 1982, 1983, and 1985, and was the 1985 United States Synchronized Swimming Inter-collegiate Athlete of the year. An outstanding student, she was an All Big-10 Academic selection in 1984, as well as an OSU Scholar Athlete for four years. Karen graduated OSU with a degree in biochemistry in 1985, graduating with honors while maintaining a 3.5 grade point average. Both she and her sister Sarah attended medical school but left after two semesters.

== Olympic medals ==
Karen partnered with her twin sister Sarah Josephson to win a silver medal in the women's duet at the 1988 Summer Olympics in Seoul and then a gold medal in the same event with her sister at the 1992 Summer Olympics in Barcelona where she was managed by U.S. Synchronized Swimming Team Hall of Fame Head Coach Gail Emery.

Sarah and Karen spent twelve years on the U.S. National Synchronized swimming team. After graduating Ohio State University in 1985, the sisters moved to Walnut Creek, California to train with Gail Emery and the U.S. National Team. After college, they swam for a period with Emery's Walnut Creek Aquanuts team.

Sarah and her sister Karen were American National Synchronized Swimming Champions in Duet competition seven times.

=== International competition ===
Josephson competed at the 1987 Pan American Game in Indianapolis, winning gold medals in duet and team events.

Between 1988-1992, the team of Karen and Sarah were undefeated in Duet competition. Karen won silver medals in the duet and team events at the 1986 World Championships in Madrid. At the 1991 World Championships in Perth she won gold medals in the same events.

Karen and Sarah remained in greater Concord, California, at least through 2010.

=== Honors ===
Karen became a member of The Ohio State University Athletic Hall of Fame in 1993, and the International Swimming Hall of Fame in 1997. She became a member of Connecticut's Bristol Sports Hall of Fame in 1997. At the time of their induction, Sarah and sister Karen were only one of two Synchronized Swimming duet teams to become members of the International Swimming Hall of Fame.

== See also ==
- List of members of the International Swimming Hall of Fame
