= Synchronized swimming at the 1998 Asian Games – Women's solo =

Women's solo at the 1998 Asian Games
- Venue: Thammasat Aquatic Center
- Dates: 13–14 December 1998
- Competitors: 7 from 7 nations

Medalists
gold medal	Miya Tachibana	Japan
silver medal	Choi Yoo-jin	South Korea
bronze medal	Li Yuanyuan	China

The women's solo synchronized swimming competition at the 1998 Asian Games in Bangkok was held on 13 December and 14 December at the Thammasat Aquatic Center.

== Schedule ==
All times are Indochina Time (UTC+07:00)

Date	Time	Event
Sunday, 13 December 1998	09:00	Technical routine
Monday, 14 December 1998	17:00	Free routine

== Results ==
Rank	Athlete	Technical (35%)	Free (65%)	Total
1st place, gold medalist(s)	Miya Tachibana (JPN)	33.973	63.960	97.933
2nd place, silver medalist(s)	Choi Yoo-jin (KOR)	33.320	62.530	95.850
3rd place, bronze medalist(s)	Li Yuanyuan (CHN)	32.783	61.446	94.229
4	Aliya Karimova (KAZ)	29.657	56.896	86.553
5	Marina Abrashkina (UZB)	29.260	55.424	84.684
6	Wong Man Ting (HKG)	27.837	52.736	80.573
7	Sirintra Pongsarak (THA)	25.480	48.404	73.884
