= Synchronised swimming at the 1986 World Aquatics Championships =

These are the results from the synchronised swimming competition at the 1986 World Aquatics Championships. Canada won 3 gold medals in the tournament. It was the fifth World Aquatics Championship

== Medal table ==
Rank	Nation	Gold	Silver	Bronze	Total
1	Canada (CAN)	3	0	0	3
2	United States (USA)	0	3	0	3
3	Japan (JPN)	0	0	2	2
4	France (FRA)	0	0	1	1
Totals (4 entries)		3	3	3	9

== Medal summary ==
Event	Gold	Silver	Bronze
Solo routine	Carolyn Waldo (CAN); 200.033	Sarah Josephson (USA); 194.967	Muriel Hermine (FRA); 186.250
Duet routine	Michelle Cameron (CAN); Carolyn Waldo (CAN); 196.267	Karen Josephson (USA); Sarah Josephson (USA); 193.401	Megumi Itō (JPN); Mikako Kotani (JPN); 185.467
Team routine	Canada Nathalie Audet; Michelle Cameron; Sylvie Fréchette; Karin Larsen; Chantal Laviolette; Traci Meades; Missy Morlock; Carolyn Waldo; 191.200	United States Kristen Babb-Sprague; Lori Hatch; Karen Josephson; Sarah Josephson; Karen Madsen; Susan Reed; Lisa Riddell; Mary Visniski; 190.821	Japan Hisako Aoishi; Emiko Goto; Emiko Hirada; Megumi Itō; Mikako Kotani; Xurika Ohgane; Aki Takayama; Miyako Tanaka; 185.763
