= Kaori Takahashi (synchronized swimmer) =

Japanese synchronized swimmer

Personal information
- Born: March 30, 1974 (age 52) Iwate Prefecture, Japan

Sport
- Sport: Synchronised swimming
Medal record
Representing Japan
Olympic Games
Bronze medal – third place	1996 Atlanta	Team
World Championships
Bronze medal – third place	1994 Rome	Team

Kaori Takahashi (高橋 馨, Takahashi Kaori; born 30 March 1974) is a Japanese former synchronized swimmer who competed in the 1996 Summer Olympics.
