= Emily LeSueur =

American synchronized swimmer (born 1972)

Personal information
- Full name: Emily J. Porter LeSueur
- Born: November 7, 1972 (age 53) Glendale, California, U.S.
- Height: 170 cm (5 ft 7 in)
- Weight: 55 kg (121 lb)
- Spouse: Dr. Ben LeSueur

Sport
- Sport: Swimming
- Strokes: Synchronized swimming
- College team: University of Arizona
Medal record
Women's synchronized swimming
Representing the United States
Olympic Games
Gold medal – first place	1996 Atlanta	Team

Emily LeSueur (born November 7, 1972) is an American competitor in synchronized swimming and was a 1996 Atlanta Olympic champion.

== Early life ==
LeSueur tried several sports, starting out as a dancer, and as a youth started in a Mesa Parks Swim program. Because of her love of both swimming and the water, she decided on synchronized swimming. She first took up the sport at age 12, around 1984 in Mesa, Arizona, where she grew up. She attended Carson Junior High and swam for Mesa's Westwood High School. From around 1985-1994, she performed with the Arizona Stars, known as the Arizona Aqua Stars.

She later enrolled and graduated from Arizona State University where she met her husband. At Arizona State, she earned a bachelor’s degree in elementary education, and was an All-American in synchronized swimming.

== Pre-Olympic competition ==
Prior to the 1996 Olympics, she was a US Olympic Festival team champion, a US Collegiate solo champion, a French Open team champion, and a US Collegiate solo silver medalist.

Competing under her maiden name of Emily Porter, she won a gold medal at the 1991 Pan American Games in group competition. After travelling extensively for a period as a competitor, she trained for the Olympics with the U.S. team in California's San Francisco Bay Area, where most of the members of the U.S. team lived. Training for six to eight hours a day, she did road running, plyometrics, dancing, and swimming, in addition to her rigorous water routines. After the Olympics, she planned to work as a teacher while her husband attended medical school.

== 1996 Atlanta Olympics ==
She competed with the American team of ten at the Georgia Tech Aquatic Center, receiving a gold medal in synchronized team competition at the 1996 Summer Olympics in Atlanta. Since 1973 the top finishers had always been America, followed by Canada, and then Japan, and that was the order of finish in Atlanta in 1996.

In 1993 she married dermatologist Ben LeSueur, who also attended Arizona State, and after medical school would practice in Phoenix, Arizona. The couple raised five children.
