= Synchronized swimming at the 1995 Pan American Games =

- No. of events: 3

Synchronized swimming at the 1995 Pan American Games was held from March 11 to March 26, 1995 in Mar del Plata, Argentina. There were three medal events.

== Medal table ==
Rank	Nation	Gold	Silver	Bronze	Total
1	United States	3	0	0	3
2	Canada	0	3	0	3
3	Mexico	0	0	2	2
4	Venezuela	0	0	1	1
Totals (4 entries)		3	3	3	9

== Medalists ==
Event	Gold		Silver		Bronze	
Solo	Becky Dyroen-Lancer; United States	97.090	Karen Clark; Canada	95.595	María Elena Giusti; Venezuela	95.381
Duet	United States (USA); Becky Dyroen-Lancer; Jill Sudduth	96.451	Canada (CAN); Lisa Alexander; Erin Woodley	95.471	Mexico (MEX); Wendy Aguilar; Lilian Leal	92.270
Team	United States (USA); Suzannah Bianco; Tammy Cleland; Becky Dyroen-Lancer; Emily Porter LeSueur; Heather Pease; Jill Savery; Nathalie Schneyder; Heather Simmons; Jill Sudduth; Margot Thien	96.164	Canada (CAN)	95.059	Mexico (MEX)	92.997
