= Tammy Cleland =

American synchronized swimmer (born 1975)

Personal information
- Full name: Tammy P. Cleland-McGregor
- Born: October 26, 1975 (age 50) Sanford, Florida, U.S.
- Occupation(s): Synchro Coach: Aquanuts 2003-07; Team USA 2006; Beijing Olympics 2008
- Height: 172 cm (5 ft 8 in)
- Weight: 59 kg (130 lb)

Sport
- Sport: Synchronized swimming
- Club: Loreleis (Maitland, Fl); Walnut Creek Aquanuts (CA)
- Coached by: Mary Rose (Loreleis); Gail Emery (Aquanuts)
Medal record
Women's synchronized swimming
Representing the United States
Olympic Games
Gold medal – first place	1996 Atlanta	Team
World Aquatics Championships
Gold medal – first place	1994 Rome	Team

Tammy P. Cleland (born October 26, 1975), later known by her married name Tammy Cleland-McGregor is a former American competitor in synchronized swimming, a 1996 Olympic champion, and a 2000 Sydney Olympic participant. She would later serve as a Synchro coach for her former team, the Aquanuts from 2003-2007, and for the U.S. Olympic team in Beijing n 2008.

Tammy Cleland was born in Sanford, Florida in greater Orlando, to Troy and Thelma Cleland on August 26, 1975. She started in synchronized swimming by the age of five while also participating in competitive swimming. At seven, she trained and competed in Synchro with the Loreleis, founded by synchronized swim Coach Mary Rose, in Maitland, Florida, where Tammy won the solo and duet competition at the Sunshine State Games in Orlando in July, 1983. Competing as a competitive swimmer for the Orlando Area Dolphins, at age eight she won the 50 freestyle in 33.67, the 25 breaststroke in 21.08, and the 25 fly in 17.06 at the Dolphins Invitational meet in April, 1984. In July, 1985, at age nine she won the Figures and the Trios events in synchro competition at the Sunshine State Games in Brandon, Florida.

== Move to Walnut Creek, California ==
At 10, Cleland moved with her family to Walnut Creek, California area, living in Concord, California where she later attended and graduated Northgate High School, and began training with the Walnut Creek Aquanuts under Hall of Fame Coach Gail Emery. At 14, she represented the United States at the America Cup in early August, 1990, in Irvine, California.

== Olympics ==
=== 1996 Atlanta gold medal ===
She participated on the American team that received a gold medal in the synchronized team event at the 1996 Summer Olympics in Atlanta. 1996 was the first year the team event was included in the Olympic synchro competition. The 1996 Olympic team championship in Synchronized swimming presented the United States with the gold, Canada with the silver, and Japan with the bronze, which was the same order for the team event at the 1994 World Championships. At the Athens Olympics she was coached by her Walnut Creek Coach Gail Emery, as well as Coach Chris Carver from the Santa Clara Aquamaids, an exceptional program. Tammy performed the routine "Patriotic" and "Symphony" with other Walnut Creek Aquanut synchronized swimmers that included Heather Pease Olsen, Margot Thien, and Nathalie Schneyder Bartleson. Their routine, which was given 10's was considered nearly perfect by several judges, and received a standing ovation from the audience.

After the Atlanta Olympics, Cleland studied fashion merchandising at San Francisco State, and earned a degree before deciding to train again for the Sydney Olympics in 2000. She returned to the Aquanuts to resume her training.

=== 2000 Sydney ===
As Tammy Cleland McGregor, with former Walnut Creek teammate Jill Savery as team Captain, Cleland-McGregor competed again in the Synchronized swimming team event four years later at the Sydney Olympics in 2000, finishing in fifth position. The order of finish that year in the team competition was Russia with the gold, Japan with the silver, Canada with the bronze, and then France. Russia had not formerly placed in the Olympic team event which had begun in 1996.

Demonstrating her timing and ability to synchronize in group events, at the 1994 World Championships, McGregor won a gold medal in the team competition.

== Coaching ==
After ending her competitive career, Cleland coached synchronized swimming for her former team, the Walnut Creek Aquanuts from 2003-2007. In 2006, she was named as the syncro coach of Team USA, and would serve as a coach for the US synchro swimming team at the Beijing Olympics in 2008.
