= Mikako Kotani =

Japanese synchronized swimmer

Mikako Kotani OLY
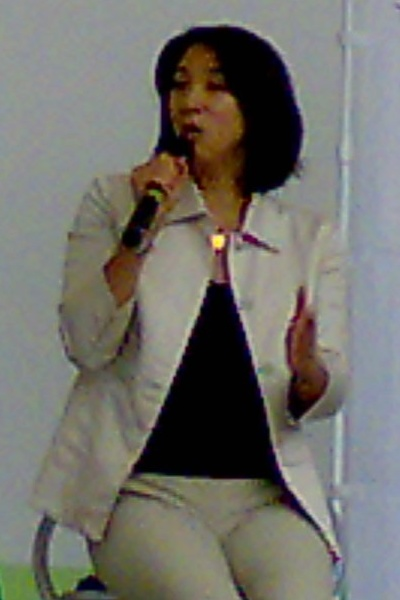
- Kotani in 2008

Personal information
- Native name: 小谷 実可子, Kotani Mikako
- Nationality: Japan
- Born: 30 August 1966 (age 59) Tokyo, Japan
- Height: 1.64 m (5 ft 5 in)
- Weight: 53 kg (117 lb)

Sport
- Sport: Swimming
- Strokes: Synchronised swimming
Medal record
Olympic Games
Synchronised swimming
Bronze medal – third place	1988 Seoul	Women's solo
Bronze medal – third place	1988 Seoul	Women's duet
World Championships
Bronze medal – third place	1986 Madrid	-Duet
Bronze medal – third place	1986 Madrid	-Team
Silver medal – second place	1991 Perth	-Duet
Bronze medal – third place	1991 Perth	-Solo
Bronze medal – third place	1991 Perth	-Team
Pan Pacific Swimming Championships
Gold medal – first place	1985 Tokyo	-Duet
Silver medal – second place	1985 Tokyo	-Solo
Gold medal – first place	1987 Brisbane	-Duet
World Cup
Bronze medal – third place	1985 Indianapolis	-Team
Bronze medal – third place	1987 Cairo	-Duet
Bronze medal – third place	1987 Cairo	-Team
Silver medal – second place	1989 Paris	-Duet
Bronze medal – third place	1989 Paris	-Solo
Bronze medal – third place	1989 Paris	-Team

Mikako Kotani (小谷 実可子, Kotani Mikako; born 30 August 1966) is a Japanese former synchronized swimmer who competed in the 1988 Summer Olympics, where she gained a bronze medal each for the solo and duet events, and the 1992 Summer Olympics. She was the first woman to be Japan's flag-bearer for the 1988 Summer Olympics Opening Ceremony.

== Retirement ==
Since retiring, Mikako Kotani has opened a synchronized swimming school and served on the JOC (Japanese Olympic Committee), IOC Athletes' Commission, and Association of National Olympic Committees. In 1997, she introduced the resolution to promote Olympic truce to the United Nations General Assembly. In 2013, she was chosen to present the proposed venue layout for Tokyo's successful bid to host the 2020 Summer Olympics.

As of September 2017, she is currently a director on the board for the JOC and Olympians Association of Japan. In addition, she is on the executive committee of the World Olympians Association.

== See also ==
- List of members of the International Swimming Hall of Fame
