= Akiko Kawase (synchronized swimmer) =

Japanese synchronized swimmer

Personal information
- Born: 13 July 1971 (age 54) Tokyo, Japan
Medal record
Synchronized swimming
Representing Japan
Olympic Games
Bronze medal – third place	1996 Atlanta	Team

Akiko Kawase (born 13 July 1971 in Tokyo) is a Japanese former synchronized swimmer who competed in the 1996 Summer Olympics.
