= Megumi Itō (synchronized swimmer) =

Japanese synchronized swimmer

Personal information
- National team: Japan
- Born: March 6, 1966 (age 60) Tokyo, Japan
- Height: 1.65 m (5 ft 5 in)
- Weight: 53 kg (117 lb)

Sport
- Sport: Swimming
- Strokes: Synchronised swimming
Medal record
Women's synchronized swimming
Representing Japan
World Championships
Bronze medal – third place	1986 Madrid	Duet Routine
Bronze medal – third place	1986 Madrid	Team Routine

Megumi Itō (伊東 恵, Itō Megumi; born 6 March 1966) is a former Japanese competitor in synchronised swimming. She competed for Japan in the women's solo competition at the 1988 Summer Olympics.

She won two bronze medals at the 1986 World Aquatics Championships.
