= Valérie Hould-Marchand =

Canadian synchronized swimmer

Personal information
- Born: May 29, 1980 (age 46) Rivière-du-Loup, Quebec, Canada

Sport
- Sport: Synchronised swimming
Medal record
Representing Canada
Olympic Games
| Silver medal – second place | 1996 Atlanta | Team |
Pan American Games
| Gold medal – first place | 1999 Winnipeg | Team |
Commonwealth Games
| Gold medal – first place | 1998 Kuala Lumpur | Solo |

Valérie Hould-Marchand (born May 29, 1980) is a retired Canadian synchronized swimmer and Olympic medalist.

== Career ==
Hould-Marchand was a member of the Canadian team that received a silver medal in the team event at the age of 16 at the 1996 Summer Olympics in Atlanta. She would go on to win gold in two major competitions, the 1998 Commonwealth Games in the solo event and 1999 Pan American Games in the team event. She became embroiled in a dispute with the national synchronized swimming organization when they prevented her from training her solo routine, despite already being selected to compete in the 2000 Summer Olympics, Hould-Marchard fought for her rights but was officially retired for doing so despite strict instructions from the sport minister of Canada not to do so. A committee was born out of this battle in order to give a safe haven to athletes to be heard without putting their career at risk.
