= Synchronised swimming at the 1978 World Aquatics Championships =

These are the results from the synchronised swimming competition at the 1978 World Aquatics Championships. Canada was the top achiever in the competition, winning 2 gold medals and 1 bronze.

== Medal table ==
Rank	Nation	Gold	Silver	Bronze	Total
1	Canada (CAN)	2	0	1	3
2	United States (USA)	1	1	1	3
3	Japan (JPN)	0	2	1	3
Totals (3 entries)		3	3	3	9

== Medal summary ==
Event	Gold	Silver	Bronze
Solo routine	Helen Vanderburg (CAN); 187.849	Pam Tryon (USA); 181.499	Yasuko Unezaki (JPN); 179.650
Duet routine	Michelle Calkins (CAN); Helen Vanderburg (CAN); 183.300	Masako Fujiwara (JPN); Yasuko Fujiwara (JPN); 181.842	Michele Barone (USA); Pam Tryon (USA); 180.758
Team routine	United States (USA); 182.300	Japan (JPN); 181.533	Canada (CAN); 177.919
