= Karen Fonteyne =

Canadian synchronized swimmer

Personal information
- Nationality: Canadian
- Born: January 29, 1969 (age 57)

Sport
- Sport: Synchronized swimming
Medal record
Representing Canada
Women's synchronized swimming
Olympic Games
Silver medal – second place	1996 Atlanta	Team
Pan American Games
Silver medal – second place	1987 Indianapolis	Duet
Silver medal – second place	1987 Indianapolis	Team
Silver medal – second place	1995 Mar del Plata	Team

Karen Fonteyne (born January 29, 1969) is a Canadian competitor in synchronized swimming and Olympic medalist.

She participated on the Canadian team that received a silver medal in synchronized team at the 1996 Summer Olympics in Atlanta.

She received a silver medal in duet with Karn Sribney at the 1987 Pan American Games in Indianapolis.
