= Lilián Leal =

Mexican synchronized swimmer

Personal information
- Born: February 23, 1975 (age 51) Mexico City, Mexico

Sport
- Sport: Synchronised swimming
Medal record
Representing Mexico
Pan American Games
Bronze medal – third place	1995 Mar del Plata	Duet
Bronze medal – third place	1995 Mar del Plata	Team
Central American and Caribbean Games
Gold medal – first place	1993 Ponce	Duet
Gold medal – first place	1993 Ponce	Team
Gold medal – first place	1998 Maracaibo	Duet
Gold medal – first place	1998 Maracaibo	Solo

Lilián Leal Ramírez (born 23 February 1975) is a Mexican former synchronized swimmer who competed in the 1996 Summer Olympics and in the 2000 Summer Olympics.
