= Wendy Aguilar =

Mexican synchronized swimmer (born 1972)

Personal information
- Born: 14 May 1972 (age 54)

Sport
- Sport: Synchronised swimming
Medal record
Representing Mexico
Pan American Games
Bronze medal – third place	1995 Mar del Plata	Team

Wendy Aguilar (born 14 May 1972) is a Mexican former synchronized swimmer who competed in the 1996 Summer Olympics.
