= Li Yuanyuan (synchronized swimmer) =

Chinese synchronized swimmer (born 1976)

Personal information
- Born: September 24, 1976 (age 49) Sichuan, China

Sport
- Sport: Swimming
Medal record
Representing China
Asian Games
Bronze medal – third place	1998 Bangkok	Solo

Li Yuanyuan (Chinese: 李园圆, born 24 September 1976) is a Chinese former synchronized swimmer who competed in the 1996 Summer Olympics and in the 2000 Summer Olympics.
