= Suzannah Bianco =

American synchronized swimmer

Suzannah Dyroen -Bianco
Personal information
- Born: Suzannah Dyroen; May 15, 1973 (age 53) San Jose, California, U.S.
- Education: West Valley College
- Occupations: Performer, Synchro Coach
- Height: 165 cm (5 ft 5 in)
- Weight: 52 kg (115 lb)
- Spouse: Bradley Bianco (Divorced)
- Children: yes

Sport
- Club: Santa Clara Aquamaids
- Coached by: Chris Carver (Aquamaids)
Medal record
Women's synchronized swimming
Representing the United States
Olympic Games
Gold medal – first place	1996 Atlanta	Team
World Aquatics Championships
Gold medal – first place	1994 Rome	Team

Suzannah Dyroen Bianco (née Dyroen) (born May 15, 1973) is an American competitor in synchronized swimming and a 1998 Atlanta Olympic champion.

Suzanne Dyroen was born May 15, 1973 in San Jose, California. She is the sister of synchronized swimmer Becky Dyroen-Lancer. Bianco swam for the Santa Clara Swim Club, where through the age of eight through twenty-four, she was part of the highly competitive Santa Clara Aquamaids sycnronized swimming team under Hall of Fame Head Coach Chris Carver.

In career highlights, at the 1994 World Championships, Bianco won a gold medal in the group competition and at the 1995 Pan American Games won another gold in group competition.

At the April, 1995 Jantzen National Synchronized swimming championships at the Tonawanda Aquatic Fitness Center, Suzannah's Santa Clara Aquamaids team won the team championship with her sister Becky Dryoen-Lancer also participating and winning gold medals in the solo, duet and figures, competition.

Prior to the Olympics, Dryoen married Bradley Bianco in 1993, a cyclist, though the marriage was not a lengthy one. The couple had children together.

== 1996 Atlanta Olympics ==
She participated on the American team that received a gold medal in the synchronized swimming team event at the 1996 Summer Olympics in Atlanta. The United States Team finished first, with Canada second, and Japan third, in the same order they had finished in the 1994 Championships two years earlier. The U.S. team received a perfect score of ten that year from the judges in the team event for the first time in the event, with four of the team members having trained with the Santa Clara Aquamaids.

=== Later life ===
Bianco was a graduate of Northern California's West Valley College in Saratoga, where she majored in nutrition. Around 1996, she worked as a Health Coach targeting middle age women. In 1997, she coached the 12-13 age group for the Santa Clara Aquamaids where her swimmers performed well and won the team championship. She remained as a youth coach with the Aquamaids for a number of years. Beginning around 1998, Bianco performed professionally with the Las Vegas production of "O", a swimming performance featuring a fantasy aquatic universe staged at the Bellagio Hotel, where she continued as a performer over five years.
