= Long Yan =

Chinese synchronized swimmer

Personal information
- Born: September 22, 1973 (age 52) Wuhan, Hubei, China

Sport
- Sport: Synchronised swimming
Medal record
Representing China
Asian Games
Bronze medal – third place	1998 Bangkok	Duet

Long Yan (Chinese: 龙艳, born 22 September 1973) is a Chinese former synchronized swimmer who competed in the 1996 Summer Olympics.
