= Li Min (synchronized swimmer) =

Chinese synchronized swimmer

Personal information
- Born: February 20, 1976 (age 50) Wuhan, Hubei, China

Sport
- Sport: Synchronised swimming
Medal record
Representing China
Asian Games
| Silver medal – second place | 1994 Hiroshima | Duet |
| Bronze medal – third place | 1998 Bangkok | Duet |

Li Min (Chinese: 李敏, born 20 February 1976) is a Chinese former synchronized swimmer who competed in the 1996 Summer Olympics and in the 2000 Summer Olympics.
