= Christine Larsen =

Canadian synchronized swimmer

Personal information
- Born: December 15, 1967 (age 58) Coquitlam, British Columbia, Canada

Sport
- Sport: Synchronised swimming
Medal record
Representing Canada
Women's synchronized swimming
Olympic Games
Silver medal – second place	1996 Atlanta	Team
World Championships
Silver medal – second place	1998 Perth	Team
Commonwealth Games
Gold medal – first place	1990 Auckland	Duet
Bronze medal – third place	1990 Auckland	Figures

Christine Larsen (born December 15, 1967) is a Canadian competitor in synchronized swimming and Olympic medalist.

She competed for Canada and received a silver medal in synchronized team swimming at the 1996 Summer Olympics in Atlanta.

Larsen is the sister of sportscaster and fellow Olympian Karin Larsen, who covered Larsen's medal-winning performance for CBC News.
