= Becky Dyroen-Lancer =

American synchronized swimmer (born 1971)

Personal information
- Full name: Rebekah Dyroen-Lancer
- Born: February 19, 1971 (age 55) San Jose, California, U.S.
- Education: West Valley College; DeAnza College
- Occupations: Synchronized Swim Coach; Schoolteacher
- Height: 174 cm (5 ft 9 in)
- Weight: 58 kg (128 lb)
- Spouse: Kevin Lancer
- Children: Dyroen and Thomas

Sport
- Club: Santa Clara Aquamaids
- Coached by: Chris Carver (Aquamaids)
Medal record
Women's synchronised swimming
Representing the United States
Olympic Games
Gold medal – first place	1996 Atlanta	Team
World Aquatics Championships
Gold medal – first place	1994 Rome	Solo
Gold medal – first place	1994 Rome	Duet
Gold medal – first place	1994 Rome	Team
Pan American Games
Gold medal – first place	1991 Havana	Solo
Gold medal – first place	1995 Mar del Plata	Solo
Gold medal – first place	1995 Mar del Plata	Duet

Rebekah Dyroen-Lancer (born February 19, 1971) is an American competitor in synchronised swimming and Olympic champion. Demonstrating unparalleled dominance in her sport, she won nine grand slams successively between 1992-1996, which required winning solo, duet, team, and figures events in major Synchronized Swimming competitions nine times. After her career as a competitor, she served as a synchronized swimming coach, and later had a career as a school teacher.

== Early life ==
Rebekah Dyroen was born February 17, 1971 in San Jose, California. Born a blue baby, she overcame an early heart ailment requiring open heart surgery to become a future Olympic champion. From a swimming family, Becky's mother Paula, a former synchronized swimmer, may have influenced her to select synchronized swimming as an early pursuit. By nine, Becky competed and trained with the renowned Santa Clara Aquamaids Synchro Team under Hall of Fame Head Coach Chris Carver. Her sister Suzannah Dyroen-Bianco, who would be part of Becky's 1996 gold medal in the synchro team event, also trained with the Aquamaids.

By 1988, Dyroen-Lancer was a member of the U.S. National team. Distinguishing herself prior to the Olympics, she was a Junior World Solo, Duet and Team champion in 1989. She captured a silver medal at the Moscow Invitational Duet in 1990 and from 1990-1995 received honors as a United States Synchronized Swimming All-American.

At the 1992 U.S. Olympic trials, Becky placed second in the solo event competition.

== 1996 Atlanta Olympics ==
Acting as team Captain, Dyroen-Lancer participated on the American team that received a gold medal in synchronized swimming at the 1996 Summer Olympics in Atlanta. Demonstrating excellence in her sport, after performing their free routine entitled "Fantasia on the Orchestra", her U.S. synchro team received "10's" from each of the 10 judges for a perfect score of 100. The United States Team finished first, with Canada second, and Japan third, in the same order they had finished in the 1994 Championships two years earlier.

=== College ===
Dyroen-Lancer attended West Valley College, and by July 1996, finished her education at DeAnza College in Cuppertino where she studied Secondary Education.

== International competition ==
She received a gold medal in solo at the 1991 Pan American Games in Havana. At the World Championships, Becky captured a total of four golds, in a 1991 win in the group event, and a 1994 victory in the solo, duet, and group events. She likewise won four gold medals at the Pan American Games, winning the solo in 1991, and the Grand Slam of solo, duet, and group in 1995. Between 1993-1995, she captured nine FINA World Cup titles. After 1993, Dyroen-Lancer was undefeated in Synchronized swimming FINA events that she entered.

She received a gold medal in solo, and a second gold medal in duet with Jill Sudduth at the 1995 Pan American Games in Mar del Plata, Argentina. The majority of Becky's duet competition were won with partner Jill Sudduth. Her choreography was aided with the efforts of her husband Kevin Lancer, who had worked as a professional ballet dancer.

== Awards ==
Becky Dyroen-Lancer was inducted into the International Swimming Hall of Fame in Fort Lauderdale, Florida, in 2004. Broadly recognized for her achievements in synchronized swimming, for each of the years from 1993-1995, she received the honor of Synchronized Swimmer of the Year by Swimming World Magazine.

== Professional pursuits ==
Becky worked as the choreographer for the synchronized swimming scene in Austin Powers The Spy Who Shagged Me. She also worked for Cirque du Soleil from 2000 to 2005 as a performer in O.

Becky coached various levels of synchronized swimming for many years after her time with Cirque du Soleil, sharing her knowledge with the next generation of synchronized swimmers. In 2015, she changed life paths and moved into education. Becky is currently an art teacher at Oak Hall School in Gainesville, Florida and still coaches in synchronized swimming clinics and camps.

== See also ==
- List of members of the International Swimming Hall of Fame
