= Sylvie Fréchette =

Canadian synchronized swimmer

Sylvie Fréchette MSC
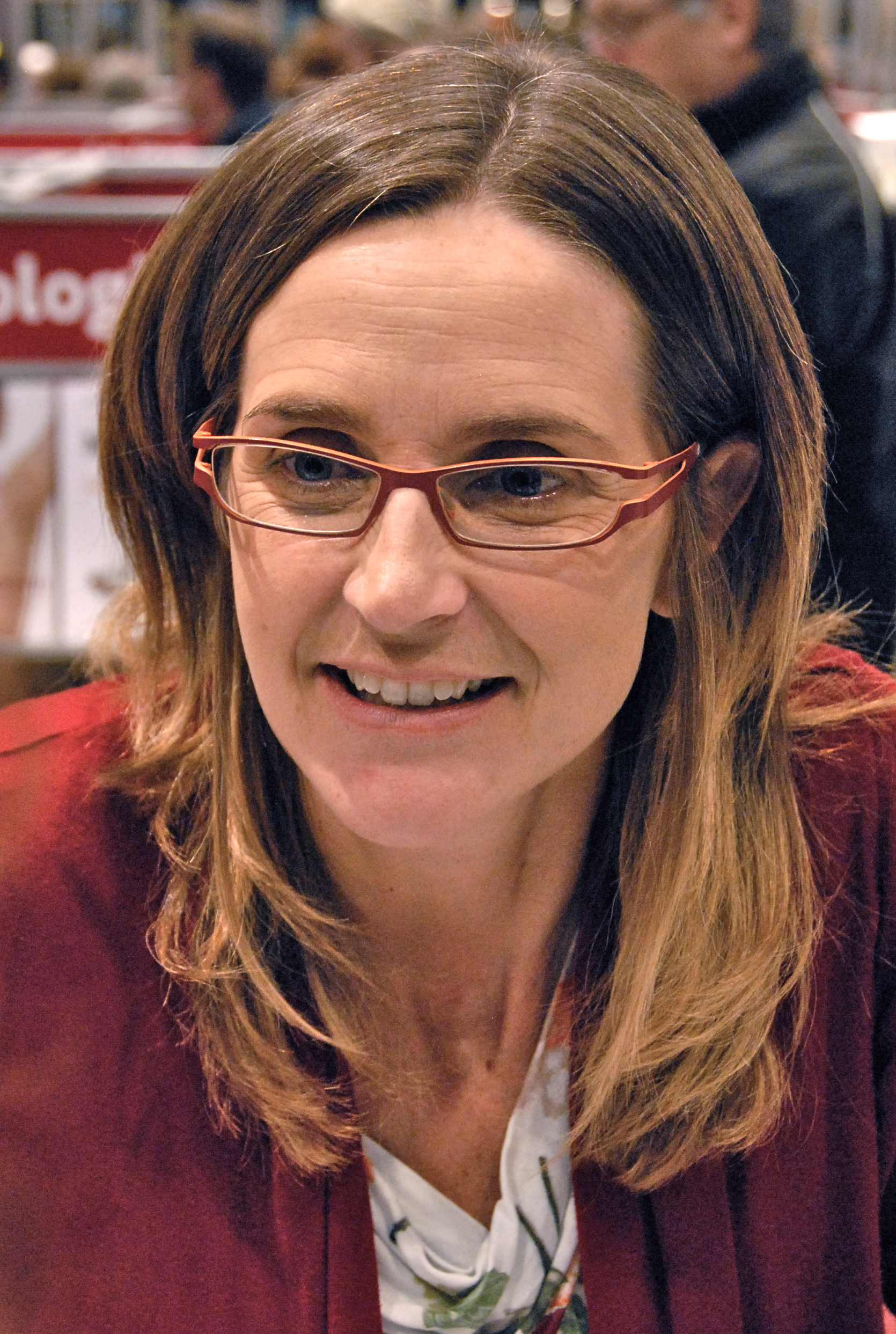
- Fréchette in 2012

Personal information
- Born: June 27, 1967 (age 59) Montreal, Quebec, Canada
- Height: 177 cm (5 ft 10 in)
- Weight: 64 kg (141 lb)

Sport
- Country: Canada
- Sport: Swimming
- Strokes: Synchronised swimming
- Club: Montréal Synchro Inc
Medal record
Synchronised swimming
Representing Canada
Olympic Games
Gold medal – first place	1992 Barcelona	Women's solo
Silver medal – second place	1996 Atlanta	Women's team
World Aquatics Championships
Gold medal – first place	1991 Perth	Women's solo
Gold medal – first place	1986 Madrid	Women's team
Commonwealth Games
Gold medal – first place	1986 Edinburgh	Women's solo
Gold medal – first place	1990 Auckland	Women's solo
Pan American Games
Silver medal – second place	1987 Indianapolis	Women's solo

Sylvie Fréchette, MSC (born 27 June 1967 in Montreal, Quebec) is a Canadian former synchronised swimmer. She is the 1992 Olympic champion in the women's solo event.

== Career ==
Fréchette competed in the women's solo at the 1992 Summer Olympics. In the technical figures routine, a Brazilian judge accidentally entered a score of 8.7 instead of 9.7, costing her first place; after several appeals by the Canadian Olympic Committee, her medal was upgraded to gold. Kristen Babb-Sprague, the beneficiary of the judge's error, was allowed to keep her gold medal.

Fréchette's success in the pool continued with a silver medal in the women's team event at the following Olympics. In 1999, she was inducted into Canada's Sports Hall of Fame. She has also contributed as a swimmer, designer, and coach to the synchronized-swimming portions of Cirque du Soleil's water-based stage production O, which opened in 1998 at the Bellagio hotel and casino in Las Vegas.

In 2006, Fréchette became an ambassador for Oxfam.

Fréchette ran for the Conservative Party of Canada in the 2019 Canadian federal election, as the party's candidate in the Quebec riding of Rivière-du-Nord. She came in third and, after the election, ascribed her loss to party leader Andrew Scheer's inability to take a stance on abortions.

== Personal life ==
Sylvie Frechette was engaged to her business partner Sylvain Lake, who committed suicide a week before the 1992 Games. Lake was a television track analyst and former 400 m track athlete.

== Electoral record ==
2019 Canadian federal election: Rivière-du-Nord
Party	Candidate	Votes	%	±%	Expenditures
Bloc Québécois	Rhéal Fortin	31,281	52.0	+20.0	$14,299.86
Liberal	Florence Gagnon	13,402	22.3	-4.1	$53,916.68
Conservative	Sylvie Fréchette	7,120	11.8	+3.3	$28,363.50
New Democratic	Myriam Ouellette	4,194	7.0	-23.1	none listed
Green	Joey Leckman	3,345	5.6	+3.1	$7,366.15
People's	Normand Michaud	407	0.7	–	$45.01
Indépendance du Québec	Nicolas Riqueur-Lainé	225	0.4	–	$117.25
Independent	Lucie St-Gelais	127	0.2	–	$0.00
Total valid votes/expense limit		60,101	100.0		
Total rejected ballots		1,206			
Turnout		61,307	64.0		
Eligible voters		95,813			
Bloc Québécois hold		Swing		+12.05	
Source: Elections Canada

== See also ==
- List of members of the International Swimming Hall of Fame
