= Kristen Babb-Sprague =

American synchronized swimmer

Personal information
- Full name: Kristen Elizabeth Babb-Sprague
- National team: United States
- Born: July 29, 1968 (age 57) Walnut Creek, California
- Height: 178 cm (5 ft 10 in)
- Weight: 58 kg (128 lb)
- Spouse: Ed Sprague m 1991
- Children: 4

Sport
- Sport: Swimming
- Strokes: Synchronized swimming
- Club: Walnut Creek Aquanuts (WCA)
- Coach: Sue Ahlf, Gail Emery (WCA)
Medal record
Women's synchronised swimming
Representing the United States
Olympic Games
Gold medal – first place	1992 Barcelona	Women's solo
World Championships
Silver medal – second place	1991 Perth	Women's solo

Kristen Elizabeth Babb, (born July 29, 1968) also known by her married name Kristen Elizabeth Babb-Sprague after February 1991, is an American former synchronized swimmer who competed for the Walnut Creek Aquanuts and was a 1992 Barcelona Olympic gold medalist in the solo event in synchronized swimming.

== Early life and competition ==
Babb was born on July 29, 1968 in Walnut Creek, California. Her mother Karen was a synchronized swimmer in her youth, as was her older sister Lisa which may be why Kristin began training in the sport at a very early age, initially appearing in water shows. Kristin swam for the Walnut Creek Aquanuts by the age of six where she was trained first by Coach Sue Ahlf, who founded the club in 1968, and later by Ahlf's daughter, Head Coach Gail Emery, as well as Gail Pucci, and Pam Edwards. Kristen attended nearby Northgate High School, graduating in 1986. Prior to High School she trained and competed in regular swimming competition which she gave up in 1980 to focus exclusively on synchronized swimming.

By 1987, and likely earlier, her Aquanuts coaches included her mother Karen. A nationally recognized program, the Aquanuts won the National title at the Senior Nationals in Albany, New York in 1987 for the eighth consecutive year. In the same year, while teaming with Lisa Riddell, Kristen won a gold medal in the Roma Synchronized Tournament in Italy, and a silver medal in the Majorca Open. Accustomed to travel, Kristen placed first in the solo division at the Moscow Invitational tournament in March, 1987. At 19, she attended Diablo Valley College.

In 1989 Babb-Sprague suffered a painful back injury and it was not clear if she could continue to compete. She recovered only after laying off from competition for a year.

== Marriage ==
On February 2, 1991 in Stockton, California, having resumed her demanding training schedule, Babb-Sprague married Major League Baseball player Ed Sprague Jr., who played for Stanford University and was a 1988 Olympic gold medalist in baseball. He played professionally for the Toronto Blue Jays and subsequent teams including Oakland, Pittsburgh, San Diego, Boston and Seattle. The couple formerly met at the 1987 Pan American Games, where Sprague was playing for Team USA. On October 18, 1992 Sprague hit a game winning home run in the ninth inning for the Toronto Blue Jays in Toronto in the second game of the World Series against the Atlanta Braves, but was viewed poorly by many of the Canadian fans who believed Sprague should have been more empathetic when Canadian Sylvie Fréchette was initially denied the gold medal in synchronized swimming at the August, 1992 Olympics. Sprague would later work as a Director of Player Development for the Oakland A's.

== 1992 Barcelona Olympic gold ==
On August 6, having just turned twenty-four, Babb-Sprague was awarded a gold medal in the women's solo event at the 1992 Summer Olympics in Barcelona after a scoring scandal. In the technical figures routine, a Brazilian judge accidentally entered a score of 8.7 instead of 9.7 for the Canadian swimmer Sylvie Fréchette, allowing Babb-Sprague to win the competition. Fréchette's medal was afterwards upgraded to gold by the International Swimming Federation, and in a fortunate turn of events Babb-Sprague was also allowed to retain her gold medal. Frechette, as a 1991 World Champion, had been favored to win the gold in 1992, and after the decision received her medal from the International Olympic Committee sixteen months later.

At the 1992 games, Babb deviated from a traditional approach to the sport which used operatic and classical music, by using more contemporary upbeat music including Leonard Bernstein’s “Rodeo”, John Williams’ “Cowboy” and a portion of “Amazing Grace”. A very positive response to her new approach and American Western-style performance helped earn Babb-Sprague scores of 10 in artistic impression and three scores of 10 for technical merit. She became the first synchronized swimmer to receive perfect scores in the category of artistic impression at the Olympics largely for the innovation she brought to her routines.

== Competition highlights ==
In her career, Babb-Sprague captured 13 US titles, consisting of 4 solo, 1 duet, and 8 team championships. She won a team gold at the 1991 Pan Pacific Championships, and a team silver at the 1986 World Aquatics Championships in Madrid, Spain. She won a team gold and a solo silver medal in synchronized swimming at the World Championships in Perth, Australia in January, 1991.

Babb-Sprague captured 2 golds and 2 silver medals in FINA World Cup competition. She took a team gold in Cairo in September, 1979, and a team silver in Indianapolis in August 1985. In Bonn, Germany, in September, 1991, she won a team gold and a solo silver medal.

She was the first U.S. Synchronized swimmer to qualify for 4 World Cup teams. She participated in 14 World Regional Championships or Invitational Meets where she won 16 gold and 7 silver medals.

=== Later life ===
By 2001, Kristen and Ed Sprague were raising three young children, and were living in Stockton, California and would have a fourth child. They had considered future plans to start a sports academy and a winery, having previously purchased a vineyard with 20 acres of cabernet grapes. Kristen served as a national spokesperson for the Juvenile Diabetes Foundation.

=== Honors ===
Babb-Sprague became a member of the US Synchronized Swimming Hall of Fame in 1997, and is a member of the International Swimming Hall of Fame. She was an American Athletic Union Sullivan Award finalist in 1992 and a USSS Athlete of the Year. She received the honor of being named the “Womens Sports and Fitness” Magazine Up-and-Coming Athlete of the Year three times.

== See also ==
- List of members of the International Swimming Hall of Fame
