= Nathalie Schneyder =

American synchronized swimmer (born 1968)

Personal information
- Born: May 25, 1968 (age 58) San Francisco, California, U.S.
- Occupation: Syncro Coach
- Height: 167 cm (5 ft 6 in)
- Weight: 58 kg (128 lb)
- Spouse: Erin Bartleson

Sport
- Sport: Synchronized Swimming
- Club: Walnut Creek Aquanuts
- Coached by: Gail Emory
Medal record
Synchronised swimming
Representing the United States
Olympic Games
Gold medal – first place	1996 Atlanta	Team
World Championships
Gold medal – first place	1994 Rome	Team

Nathalie Schneyder (born May 25, 1968) is a former American competitor in synchronized swimming and has served as an accomplished coach. She was an Olympic champion in team competition in the 1996 Atlanta Olympics, and won team golds in FINA World competitions and Pan Pacific competitions. She competed in team, individual, and duet synchronized competition.

== Walnut Creek Aquanuts ==
After starting swimming lessons around the age of four, Nathalie began competing in synchronized swimming at eight with the Walnut Creek Aquanuts Synchronized Swimming Team. An exceptional team first formed in 1968, to date the Aquanuts have been national champions 14 times. The group was essential in providing Nathalie with an early grasp of synchronized swimming fundamentals and skills.

== 1996 Olympic Team Gold in Atlanta ==
Born in San Francisco, California, she was a member of the American team that received a gold medal in synchronized swimming at the 1996 Summer Olympics in Atlanta. The team received the first "10" score in the synchro free style event in the history of the Olympics. She also won a team gold medal in 1994 in Rome.

According to one source, Nathalie married Division II swimmer and swim coach Erin Bartleson not long after the 1996 Summer Olympics in Atlanta.

=== Influential coaches ===
Linda Krieger and Betty Hazel coached her in her earliest career. Her dancing abilities were enhanced by her Junior Team coach Joan Marie Vanaski. Nathalie swam with the U. S. National team for nine years. Lynn Virglio coached her each day in her swim workouts of 3 to 6 thousand yards completed before her synchronized swim workout. She was taken from her club's junior team to the competitive team by Gail Johnson, a 1983 Hall of Fame inductee for synchronized swimming and four-time Olympic gold medalist. Her National Team Coach Chris Carver, who was the U.S. Syncro team Head Coach at the 1996 Olympics, further enhanced her existing conditioning and skills. Karen Babb worked with her swimming figures. Hall of Famer Gail Emery, her club coach, may have been her greatest influence in developing her into an Olympic Champion. Emery was named to the International Women Sports Hall of Fame in 1997, coached the Walnut Creek Aquanuts to consecutive national championships, was a three time Olympic coach for synchronized swimming. In 2000, Emery was inducted into the International Swimming Hall of Fame.

== Competition medals ==
=== Four Fina Swimming World Cups ===
Nathalie was part of the team that won gold medals in the FINA Synchronized Swimming World Cup on September 7–9, 1989 in Paris, France, on September 12–15, 1991 in Bonn, Germany), on July 7–10, 1993 in Lausanne, Switzerland, and on August 1–5, 1995 in Atlanta, Georgia.

She won a silver team medal in the U.S. Nationals in 1992-1995, as well as taking bronze medals in duet and solo in 1993 (Fort Lauderdale) and 1995. In the 1988 and 1992 Swiss Open, she took a team gold with the American team. In the 1993 China Open, she took a silver in duet competition. She took a gold team medal in the 1994 French Open, which was particularly memorable to her as both her parents had emigrated from France.

She won a team gold medal in the Pan American games in 1995 and in the Pan Pacific games in Tokyo in 1991.

== Coaching synchro ==
Schneyder began coaching synchronized swimming after she left competition. She worked with the US Junior national team, and teams in Argentina, China, Great Britain, and the Netherlands. At Stanford, she led the team to win their NCAA title in synchronized swimming.

=== Honors ===
She was inducted into the International Swimming Hall of Fame in 2013.
