= Gail Emery =

American synchronized swimming coach

Biographical details
- Born: June 30, 1951 (age 75); LaFayette, California
- Education: CSU-Hayward

Playing career
- 1959-1972: Solfettes Walnut Creek, CA; Howell Swim Club Danville, CA; Santa Clara Aquamaids; Coach Kay Velen (Aquamaids); CSU-Hayward
- Position: synchronized swimming

Coaching career (HC unless noted)
- 1972-1998: Walnut Creek Aquanuts
- 1979-1996: U.S. National Team
- 1984-1996: U.S. Olympic Team; Coach/Coach Manager
- 1982, 1986 1991, 1994: U.S. Team World Championships
- 1998-2001: Stanford University

Accomplishments and honors

Championships
- 10 U.S. National Championships (Aquanuts); NCAA Team Championship (Stanford)

Awards
- Women's Sports Hall of Fame 1991; International Swimming Hall of Fame; Elvira College Hall of Fame 2000

Gail Emery is an American former synchronized swimmer and a Hall of Fame synchronized swimming coach for both age-group and collegiate programs. In an unprecedented achievement, Emery coached her primary team, the Walnut Creek Aquanuts to 10 consecutive national championships beginning in 1980 and served as a member of six U.S. Olympic coaching staffs. In elite international competition, she served as coach of every U.S. world championship team from 1982-1998, winning seven of the available 18 gold medals.

== Early life ==
Emery was born in 1951 in Lafayette, California, about 20 miles Northeast of San Francisco, and 4 miles West of Walnut Creek. She is a graduate of California State University-Hayward.

=== Competitor ===
She was introduced to synchronized swimming in 1959 by her mother, Sue Ahlf. Emery initially trained with the Solfettes in Walnut Creek, California, before joining the Howell Swim Club in Danville. Later, she trained with the Santa Clara Aquamaids, under Hall of Fame Coach Kay Vilen, the club's first Head Coach. While competing with the Aquamaids, she won a national team championship in 1972 and was part of a demonstration team at the Munich Olympics in the same year. Synchronized swimming did not become an Olympic event until 1984, due significantly to the efforts of Emery.

== Coaching ==
Emery started coaching the Walnut Creek Aquanuts around 1972, shortly after they were founded by her mother Sue Alf, and continued at least through 1998. In 1980, the Aquanuts defeated the Santa Clara Aquamaids, marking the start of a decade-long run of national championships.

In 1979, Emery was appointed as the U.S. national team's coach, a role she held through four Olympic cycles. She was the head coach for the 1988 Seoul, 1992 Barcelona, and 1996 Atlanta Olympics, and a coach/manager in 1984. In 1996, Emery's Co-coach for the U.S. Olympic team was Chris Carver, who would serve as a head coach for the 200 Games. Athletes coached by Emery, including Karen Josephson, twin sister Sarah Josephson and Kristen Babb-Sprague, won Olympic medals, with Babb-Sprague winning a solo gold in 1992 and the Josephson sisters earning a silver in 1988 and a gold in 1992. In the 1996 Olympics, five of Emery's athletes were part of the team that won a gold medal. In 1984, working with Head Coach Charlotte Davis, Gail helped coach Tracie Ruiz to the gold medal in the solo event and to a second gold medal in the duet event with Candy Costie. Ruiz won the silver medal in 1988.

Emery coached the U.S. team in international competitions at the World Championships from 1982 to 1998, during which her teams won seven gold medals. In FINA World Cup competitions, her teams won 25 gold and four silver medals. Her athletes also won various years of gold medals in the Pan American Games.

Under Emery's tenure, synchronized swimming evolved in technical and athletic aspects. She implemented new training methods and cross-training regimens.

In her long career, she has coached 15 Olympic gold medalists, and three silver medalists. She has developed training and coached over 50 international champions and more than 100 national event winners.

== Stanford University ==
In 1998, Emery became the coach of Stanford University's synchronized swimming program, winning the NCAA National Championship in her first year of coaching, 1998-1999. In 2000, Emery's team included Shannon Montague, the Collegiate Athlete of the Year, in addition to six All-Americans and six Academic All-Americans. Two of Emery's athletes, Lindsay Wigginton and Katie Norris, became the first Stanford synchronized swimmers to secure a place on the United States' World Championship Team. Emery left Stanford in 2001 to spend more time with her family.

=== Honors ===
She became a member of the International Swimming Hall of Fame around 2000, and was honored as a new member of the Women Sports Hall of Fame in October, 1997. She was admitted to the Elvira College Hall of Fame in 2000.
