= Artistic swimming at the Summer Olympics =

- IOC Code: SWA
- Governing body: World Aquatics
- Events: 2 (women: 1; mixed: 1)

Summer Olympics
- 1896; 1900; 1904; 1908; 1912; 1920; 1924; 1928; 1932; 1936; 1948; 1952; 1956; 1960; 1964; 1968; 1972; 1976; 1980; 1984; 1988; 1992; 1996; 2000; 2004; 2008; 2012; 2016; 2020; 2024; 2028; 2032
- Medalists

Artistic swimming (known as synchronised swimming until 2017) has been a discipline at the Summer Olympics since the 1984 Games. It is part of the Olympic sport of aquatics alongside diving, marathon swimming, swimming and water polo. The current Olympic program consists of a Women's Duet event and a Mixed Team event.

In the Women's Duet, pairs complete two routines, the Duet Technical routine and Duet Free routine, with medals awarded on cumulative scores.

In the Mixed Team, teams of eight complete three routines, the Team Technical, Team Free, and Team Acrobatic, with medals awarded on cumulative scores. Male athletes were permitted to enter this event from Paris 2024, however no male athletes have yet competed in this event.

A Women's Solo event was removed from the Olympic program after the 1992 Olympic Games.

The United States, Canada and Japan were initially the strongest nations in the sport, however from 2000 to 2020, Russian athletes competing as either Russia or under the Russian Olympic Committee flag won all twelve gold medals contested.

Following sanctions being placed on Russia competing in international events from 2021 onwards, the People's Republic of China have become the dominant force in the sport.

New rules were introduced into the sport in 2023, with the 2024 Olympic Games the first to be conducted under these rules.

== Summary ==
Games	Year	Events	Best nation
23	1984	2	United States (1)
24	1988	2	Canada (1)
25	1992	2	United States (2)
26	1996	1	United States (3)
27	2000	2	Russia (1)
28	2004	2	Russia (2)
29	2008	2	Russia (3)
30	2012	2	Russia (4)
31	2016	2	Russia (5)
32	2020	2	ROC (1)
33	2024	2	China (1)
34	2028	2	

== Events ==
Event	84	88	92	96	00	04	08	12	16	20	24	28	Years
Team	–	–	–	X	X	X	X	X	X	X	X	X	9
Women's duet	X	X	X	–	X	X	X	X	X	X	X	X	11
Women's solo	X	X	X	–	–	–	–	–	–	–	–	–	3
Total Events	2	2	2	1	2	2	2	2	2	2	2	2	

== Medal table ==
As of the conclusion of the 2024 Olympics, eleven NOCs have won Olympic medals across 21 events. The Women's solo event at the 1992 Olympics saw a tie for first place, with no silver presented.

Rank	Nation	Gold	Silver	Bronze	Total
1	Russia	10	0	0	10
2	United States	5	3	2	10
3	Canada	3	4	1	8
4	China	2	5	2	9
5	ROC (ROC)	2	0	0	2
6	Japan	0	4	10	14
7	Spain	0	3	2	5
8	Great Britain	0	1	0	1
9	Ukraine	0	0	2	2
10	France	0	0	1	1
10	Netherlands	0	0	1	1
Totals (11 entries)		22	20	21	63

== Nations and number of national participants ==
Nation	96	00	04	08	12	20	24	28	32	36	48	52	56	60	64	68	72	76	80	84	88	92	96	00	04	08	12	16	20	24	28	Years
Argentina																											2	2				2
Aruba																					2											1
Australia																				2	2	2		9	2	9	8	9	8	8		10
Austria																				2		2				2	2	2	2	2		7
Barbados																				1												1
Belarus																								2	2	2		2	2			5
Belgium																				2	1											2
Brazil																				2	3	3		2	2	2	2	9				8
Bulgaria																									2							1
Canada																				3	3	3	9	8	9	9	9	2	8	8		11
China																					3	3	8	9	8	9	9	9	8	8		10
Colombia																												2	2			2
Cuba																								2								1
Czechoslovakia																						1										1
Czech Republic																								2	2	2	2	2				5
Dominican Republic																				2												1
Egypt																				3				2	2	9	8	9	8	8		8
Finland																						1										1
France																				3	3	3	8	8	2	2	2	2	2	8		11
Germany																						2										1
Great Britain																				3	3	3				2	9	2	2	2		8
Greece																						1		2	9	2	2	2	8	2		8
Hungary																								2			2					2
Independent Olympic Athletes																						3										1
Israel																									2	2	2	2	2	2		6
Italy																				1		2	10	9	9	2	2	9	8	8		10
Japan																				3	3	3	9	9	9	9	9	9	8	8		11
Kazakhstan																								2	2	2	2	2	2			6
Liechtenstein																													2			1
Mexico																				3	3	3	9	2	2	2	2	2	2	8		11
Netherlands																				3		3			2	2			2	2		6
Netherlands Antilles																				2												1
New Zealand																				2						2				2		3
North Korea																								2		2	2					3
Puerto Rico																									2							1
Russia																							9	8	9	9	9	9	9	X		7
Slovakia																								2	2			2				3
Spain																				3	3	3		2	8	8	8	2	8	8		10
South Africa																						2										1
South Korea																					3			2	2		2			2		5
Soviet Union																					3											1
Sweden																					1											1
Switzerland																				3	3	3		2	2	2	2	2				8
Ukraine																								2	2	2	2	9	8	2		7
Unified Team																						3										1
United States																				3	3	3	10	9	9	9	2	2	2	8		11
Venezuela																				1	1	1		2								4
West Germany																				3	3											2
Nations																				21	18	22	8	24	24	24	24	24	22	18		49
Athletes																				50	46	53	78	102	104	104	100	104	104	96		793
Year	96	00	04	08	12	20	24	28	32	36	48	52	56	60	64	68	72	76	80	84	88	92	96	00	04	08	12	16	20	24	28	

== See also ==
- List of Olympic medalists in artistic swimming
- List of Olympic venues in artistic swimming
