= List of Olympic medalists in artistic swimming =

This is the complete list of Olympic medalists in Artistic Swimming (synchronized swimming).

== Current Olympic program ==
=== Women's Duet ===
Games	Gold	Silver	Bronze
1984 Los Angeles	Candy Costie and Tracie Ruiz; United States	Sharon Hambrook and Kelly Kryczka; Canada	Saeko Kimura and Miwako Motoyoshi; Japan
1988 Seoul	Michelle Cameron and Carolyn Waldo; Canada	Karen Josephson and Sarah Josephson; United States	Mikako Kotani and Miyako Tanaka; Japan
1992 Barcelona	Karen Josephson and Sarah Josephson; United States	Penny Vilagos and Vicky Vilagos; Canada	Fumiko Okuno and Aki Takayama; Japan
2000 Sydney	Olga Brusnikina and Mariya Kiselyova; Russia	Miya Tachibana and Miho Takeda; Japan	Virginie Dedieu and Myriam Lignot; France
2004 Athens	Anastasia Davydova and Anastasiya Yermakova; Russia	Miya Tachibana and Miho Takeda; Japan	Alison Bartosik and Anna Kozlova; United States
2008 Beijing	Anastasia Davydova and Anastasiya Yermakova; Russia	Andrea Fuentes and Gemma Mengual; Spain	Saho Harada and Emiko Suzuki; Japan
2012 London	Natalia Ishchenko and Svetlana Romashina; Russia	Ona Carbonell and Andrea Fuentes; Spain	Huang Xuechen and Liu Ou; China
2016 Rio de Janeiro	Natalia Ishchenko and Svetlana Romashina; Russia	Huang Xuechen and Sun Wenyan; China	Yukiko Inui and Risako Mitsui; Japan
2020 Tokyo	Svetlana Kolesnichenko and Svetlana Romashina; ROC	Huang Xuechen and Sun Wenyan; China	Marta Fiedina and Anastasiya Savchuk; Ukraine
2024 Paris	Wang Liuyi and Wang Qianyi; China	Kate Shortman and Isabelle Thorpe; Great Britain	Bregje de Brouwer and Noortje de Brouwer; Netherlands
2028 Los Angeles			

Rank	Nation	Gold	Silver	Bronze	Total
1	Russia	5	0	0	5
2	United States	2	1	1	4
3	China	1	2	1	4
4	Canada	1	2	0	3
5	ROC	1	0	0	1
6	Japan	0	2	5	7
7	Spain	0	2	0	2
8	Great Britain	0	1	0	1
9	France	0	0	1	1
9	Netherlands	0	0	1	1
9	Ukraine	0	0	1	1
Totals (11 entries)		10	10	10	30

=== Mixed Team ===
Note: Male athletes were permitted to compete in this event from Paris 2024.

Games	Gold	Silver	Bronze
1996 Atlanta	United States; Suzannah Bianco; Tammy Cleland; Becky Dyroen-Lancer; Emily LeSueur; Heather Pease; Jill Savery; Nathalie Schneyder; Heather Simmons; Jill Sudduth; Margot Thien	Canada; Lisa Alexander; Janice Bremner; Karen Clark; Karen Fonteyne; Sylvie Fréchette; Valerie Hould; Kasia Kulesza; Christine Larsen; Cari Read; Erin Woodley	Japan; Raika Fujii; Mayuko Fujiki; Rei Jimbo; Miho Kawabe; Akiko Kawase; Riho Nakajima; Miya Tachibana; Kaori Takahashi; Miho Takeda; Junko Tanaka
2000 Sydney	Russia; Yelena Azarova; Olga Brusnikina; Mariya Kiselyova; Olga Novokshchenova; Irina Pershina; Yelena Soya; Yuliya Vasilyeva; Olga Vasyukova; Yelena Antonova	Japan; Ayano Egami; Raika Fujii; Yoko Isoda; Rei Jimbo; Miya Tachibana; Miho Takeda; Yoko Yoneda; Yuko Yoneda; Juri Tatsumi	Canada; Lyne Beaumont; Claire Carver-Dias; Erin Chan; Catherine Garceau; Fanny Létourneau; Kirstin Normand; Jacinthe Taillon; Reidun Tatham; Jessica Chase
2004 Athens	Russia; Yelena Azarova; Olga Brusnikina; Anastasia Davydova; Anastasiya Yermakova; Elvira Khasyanova; Mariya Kiselyova; Olga Novokshchenova; Anna Shorina; Mariya Gromova	Japan; Michiyo Fujimaru; Saho Harada; Kanako Kitao; Emiko Suzuki; Miya Tachibana; Miho Takeda; Juri Tatsumi; Yoko Yoneda	United States; Alison Bartosik; Tamara Crow; Erin Dobratz; Rebecca Jasontek; Anna Kozlova; Sara Lowe; Lauren McFall; Stephanie Nesbitt; Kendra Zanotto
2008 Beijing	Russia; Anastasia Davydova; Anastasiya Yermakova; Mariya Gromova; Natalia Ishchenko; Elvira Khasyanova; Olga Kuzhela; Svetlana Romashina; Anna Shorina; Yelena Ovchinnikova	Spain; Alba María Cabello; Raquel Corral; Andrea Fuentes; Thaïs Henríquez; Laura López*; Gemma Mengual; Irina Rodríguez; Paola Tirados; Gisela Morón	China; Gu Beibei; Jiang Tingting; Jiang Wenwen; Liu Ou; Luo Xi; Sun Qiuting; Wang Na; Zhang Xiaohuan; Huang Xuechen
2012 London	Russia; Anastasia Davydova; Mariya Gromova; Natalia Ishchenko; Elvira Khasyanova; Daria Korobova; Alexandra Patskevich; Svetlana Romashina; Angelika Timanina; Alla Shishkina	China; Chang Si; Chen Xiaojun; Huang Xuechen; Jiang Tingting; Jiang Wenwen; Liu Ou; Luo Xi; Wu Yiwen; Sun Wenyan	Spain; Clara Basiana; Alba Cabello; Ona Carbonell; Margalida Crespí; Andrea Fuentes; Thaïs Henríquez; Paula Klamburg; Irene Montrucchio; Laia Pons
2016 Rio de Janeiro	Russia; Vlada Chigireva; Natalia Ishchenko; Svetlana Kolesnichenko; Alexandra Patskevich; Svetlana Romashina; Alla Shishkina; Maria Shurochkina; Gelena Topilina; Elena Prokofyeva	China; Gu Xiao; Guo Li; Li Xiaolu; Liang Xinping; Sun Wenyan; Tang Mengni; Yin Chengxin; Zeng Zhen; Huang Xuechen	Japan; Aika Hakoyama; Yukiko Inui; Kei Marumo; Risako Mitsui; Kanami Nakamaki; Mai Nakamura; Kano Omata; Kurumi Yoshida; Aiko Hayashi
2020 Tokyo	ROC; Vlada Chigireva; Marina Goliadkina; Svetlana Kolesnichenko; Polina Komar; Alexandra Patskevich; Svetlana Romashina; Alla Shishkina; Maria Shurochkina	China; Feng Yu; Guo Li; Huang Xuechen; Liang Xinping; Sun Wenyan; Wang Qianyi; Xiao Yanning; Yin Chengxin	Ukraine; Maryna Aleksiiva; Vladyslava Aleksiiva; Marta Fiedina; Kateryna Reznik; Anastasiya Savchuk; Alina Shynkarenko; Kseniya Sydorenko; Yelyzaveta Yakhno
2024 Paris	China; Chang Hao; Feng Yu; Wang Ciyue; Wang Liuyi; Wang Qianyi; Xiang Binxuan; Xiao Yanning; Zhang Yayi	United States; Anita Alvarez; Jaime Czarkowski; Megumi Field; Keana Hunter; Audrey Kwon; Jacklyn Luu; Daniella Ramirez; Ruby Remati	Spain; Txell Ferré; Marina García Polo; Lilou Lluís Valette; Meritxell Mas; Alisa Ozhogina; Paula Ramírez; Iris Tió; Blanca Toledano
2028 Los Angeles			

Rank	Nation	Gold	Silver	Bronze	Total
1	Russia	5	0	0	5
2	China	1	3	1	5
3	United States	1	1	1	3
4	ROC	1	0	0	1
5	Japan	0	2	2	4
6	Spain	0	1	2	3
7	Canada	0	1	1	2
8	Ukraine	0	0	1	1
Totals (8 entries)		8	8	8	24

== Discontinued Olympic events ==
=== Women's Solo ===
Games	Gold	Silver	Bronze
1984 Los Angeles	Tracie Ruiz; United States	Carolyn Waldo; Canada	Miwako Motoyoshi; Japan
1988 Seoul	Carolyn Waldo; Canada	Tracie Ruiz; United States	Mikako Kotani; Japan
1992 Barcelona	Kristen Babb-Sprague; United States	none awarded	Fumiko Okuno; Japan
1992 Barcelona	Sylvie Fréchette; Canada	none awarded	Fumiko Okuno; Japan

Rank	Nation	Gold	Silver	Bronze	Total
1	Canada	2	1	0	3
1	United States	2	1	0	3
3	Japan	0	0	3	3
Totals (3 entries)		4	2	3	9

== Athletes ==
The following table shows the most successful athletes in Olympic artistic swimming to have won at least one gold medal:

Rank	Athlete	Gold	Silver	Bronze	Total
1	Svetlana Romashina Russia	7	0	0	7
2	Natalia Ishchenko Russia	5	0	0	5
2	Anastasia Davydova Russia	5	0	0	5
4	Anastasiya Yermakova Russia	4	0	0	4
5	Svetlana Kolesnichenko Russia	3	0	0	3
5	Alexandra Patskevich Russia	3	0	0	3
5	Mariya Kiselyova Russia	3	0	0	3
5	Mariya Gromova Russia	3	0	0	3
5	Olga Brusnikina Russia	3	0	0	3
5	Elvira Khasyanova Russia	3	0	0	3
5	Alla Shishkina Russia	3	0	0	3
12	Carolyn Waldo Canada	2	1	0	3
12	Wang Qianyi China	2	1	0	3
12	Tracie Ruiz United States	2	1	0	3
15	Wang Liuyi China	2	0	0	2
15	Maria Shurochkina Russia	2	0	0	2
15	Vlada Chigireva Russia	2	0	0	2
15	Olga Novokshchenova Russia	2	0	0	2
15	Yelena Azarova Russia	2	0	0	2
15	Anna Shorina Russia	2	0	0	2
21	Michelle Cameron Canada	1	1	0	2
21	Sylvie Fréchette Canada	1	1	0	2
21	Xiao Yanning China	1	1	0	2
21	Feng Yu China	1	1	0	2
21	Karen Josephson United States	1	1	0	2
21	Sarah Josephson United States	1	1	0	2
27	Chang Hao China	1	0	0	1
27	Zhang Yayi China	1	0	0	1
27	Wang Ciyue China	1	0	0	1
27	Xiang Binxuan China	1	0	0	1
27	Heather Simmons United States	1	0	0	1
27	Olga Kuzhela Russia	1	0	0	1
27	Angelika Timanina Russia	1	0	0	1
27	Yelena Soya Russia	1	0	0	1
27	Polina Komar Russia	1	0	0	1
27	Daria Korobova Russia	1	0	0	1
27	Gelena Topilina Russia	1	0	0	1
27	Elena Prokofyeva Russia	1	0	0	1
27	Yelena Ovchinnikova Russia	1	0	0	1
27	Yuliya Vasilyeva Russia	1	0	0	1
27	Irina Pershina Russia	1	0	0	1
27	Olga Vasyukova Russia	1	0	0	1
27	Marina Goliadkina Russia	1	0	0	1
27	Becky Dyroen-Lancer United States	1	0	0	1
27	Margot Thien United States	1	0	0	1
27	Nathalie Schneyder United States	1	0	0	1
27	Emily LeSueur United States	1	0	0	1
27	Kristen Babb-Sprague United States	1	0	0	1
27	Tammy Cleland United States	1	0	0	1
27	Candy Costie United States	1	0	0	1
27	Heather Pease United States	1	0	0	1
27	Jill Sudduth United States	1	0	0	1
27	Jill Savery United States	1	0	0	1
27	Suzannah Bianco United States	1	0	0	1
27	Yelena Antonova Russia	1	0	0	1

Note: Russian medallists at Tokyo 2020 competed under the ROC banner, however are listed as Russian on the table above.
