= Synchronized swimming at the 2000 Summer Olympics – Women's team =

Women's team at the Games of the XXVII Olympiad
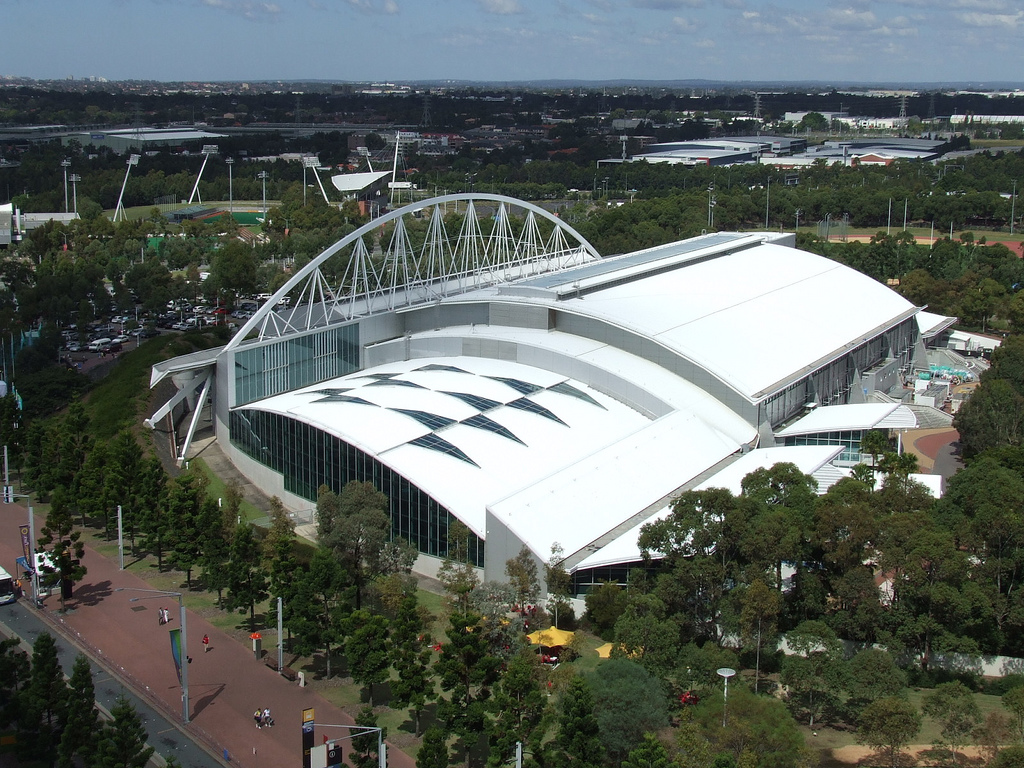
- Aquatic Centre in Sydney
- Venue: Sydney International Aquatic; Centre
- Date: 28–29 September
- Competitors: 67 from 8 nations
- Winning points: 99.146

Medalists
1st place, gold medalist(s)		Russia; Yelena Antonova, Yelena Azarova, Olga Brusnikina, Maria Kisseleva, Olga Novokshchenova, Irina Pershina, Yelena Soya, Yuliya Vasilyeva, Olga Vasyukova
2nd place, silver medalist(s)		Japan; Ayano Egami, Raika Fujii, Yoko Isoda, Rei Jimbo, Miya Tachibana, Miho Takeda, Juri Tatsumi, Yoko Yoneda, Yuko Yoneda
3rd place, bronze medalist(s)		Canada; Lyne Beaumont, Claire Carver-Dias, Erin Chan, Jessica Chase, Catherine Garceau, Fanny Létourneau, Kirstin Normand, Jacinthe Taillon, Reidun Tatham

The women's team event at the 2000 Summer Olympics in Sydney, Australia, took place at the Sydney International Aquatic Centre from 28 to 29 September. The Russian synchronized swimmers (led by duet champions Olga Brusnikina and Maria Kisseleva) performed a witch-themed routine with a variety of flying lifts and multiple pattern changes to score 99.146 out of a possible 100 points for an Olympic gold medal in the team event. The Japanese squad excelled in the artistic impression component for a score of 40 in the final free routine, but had to be satisfied with a second Olympic silver at these Games, having received an overall total of 98.860. Meanwhile, the Canadian octet snatched the bronze with a composite score of 97.357, finishing ahead of France by almost a full point (96.467). The U.S. team failed to collect an Olympic medal for the first time since the sport's introduction in 1984, as the swimmers finished the routine in fifth at 96.467.

Eight teams competed, each consisting of eight swimmers (from a total team of nine swimmers). There was a single round of competition. Each team presents two routines: a technical routine and a free routine. The technical routine consists of twelve required elements, which must be completed in order and within a time of between 2 minutes 35 seconds and 3 minutes 5 seconds. The free routine has no restrictions other than time; this routine must last between 3 minutes 45 seconds and 4 minutes 15 seconds.

For each routine, the team is judged by two panels of five judges each. One panel is the technical jury, the other is the artistic jury. Each judge gives marks of between 0 and 10. The highest and lowest score from each panel are dropped, leaving a total of six scores which are then summed to give the routine's score. The scores of the two routines are then added to give a final score for the team.

== Schedule ==
All times are Australia Standard Time (UTC+11)

Date	Time	Round
Thursday, September 28, 2000	16:30	Final technical routine
Friday, September 29, 2000	16:30	Final free routine

== Results ==
Rank	Country	Athletes	Technical	Free	Total
1st place, gold medalist(s)	Russia	Yelena Antonova, Yelena Azarova, Olga Brusnikina, Maria Kisseleva, Olga Novokshchenova, Irina Pershina, Yelena Soya, Yuliya Vasilyeva, Olga Vasyukova	34.580	64.566	99.146
2nd place, silver medalist(s)	Japan	Ayano Egami, Raika Fujii, Yoko Isoda, Rei Jimbo, Miya Tachibana, Miho Takeda, Juri Tatsumi, Yoko Yoneda, Yuko Yoneda	34.510	64.350	98.860
3rd place, bronze medalist(s)	Canada	Lyne Beaumont, Claire Carver-Dias, Erin Chan, Jessica Chase, Catherine Garceau, Fanny Létourneau, Kirstin Normand, Jacinthe Taillon, Reidun Tatham	33.767	63.570	97.357
4	France	Cinthia Bouhier, Virginie Dedieu, Charlotte Fabre, Myriam Glez, Rachel le Bozec, Myriam Lignot, Charlotte Massardier, Magali Rathier	33.763	62.704	96.467
5	United States	Carrie Barton, Tammy Cleland, Anna Kozlova, Kristina Lum, Elicia Marshall, Tuesday Middaugh, Heather Pease, Kim Wurzel	33.530	62.574	96.104
6	Italy	Giada Ballan, Serena Bianchi, Mara Brunetti, Chiara Cassin, Maurizia Cecconi, Alice Dominici, Alessia Lucchini, Clara Porchetto	32.993	62.184	95.177
7	China	Hou Yingli, Jin Na, Li Min, Li Rouping, Li Yuanyuan, Wang Fang, Xia Ye, Zhang Xiaohuan	33.017	61.576	94.593
8	Australia	Tracey Davis, Kelly Geraghty, Amanda Laird, Dannielle Liesch, Katrina Orpwood, Rachel Ren, Cathryn Wightman, Naomi Young	31.383	58.110	89.493
