= Synchronized swimming at the 2004 Summer Olympics – Women's team =

Women's team at the Games of the XXVIII Olympiad
- Aquatic Centre in Athens
- Venue: Athens Olympic Aquatic Centre
- Date: 26–27 August
- Competitors: 64 from 8 nations
- Winning points: 99.501

Medalists
| 1st place, gold medalist(s) | | Russia; Elena Azarova, Olga Brusnikina, Anastasia Davydova, Anastasia Ermakova, Elvira Khasyanova, Maria Kiseleva, Olga Novokshchenova, Anna Shorina |
| 2nd place, silver medalist(s) | | Japan; Michiyo Fujimaru, Saho Harada, Kanako Kitao, Emiko Suzuki, Miya Tachibana, Miho Takeda, Juri Tatsumi, Yoko Yoneda |
| 3rd place, bronze medalist(s) | | United States; Alison Bartosik, Tamara Crow, Erin Dobratz, Rebecca Jasontek, Anna Kozlova, Sara Lowe, Lauren McFall, Stephanie Nesbitt, Kendra Zanotto |

The women's team event at the 2004 Summer Olympics in Athens, Greece, took place at the Athens Olympic Aquatic Centre from 26 to 27 August. The Russian synchronized swimmers (led by Olympic duet champions Anastasia Davydova and Anastasia Ermakova) delivered a superb performance to defend their Olympic title in the event, having received a straight line of five perfect marks from the judges for a composite score of 99.501. Japan maintained a silver-medal streak on its second Olympics by a single point short of Russia's score with 98.501, after displaying their explosive lifts and quick changes of pattern throughout the routine. Having failed to secure an Olympic medal in the sport from the previous Olympics, the U.S. squad assembled a colorful demonstration of multiple sequences and flying leaps to hold on for the bronze with a score of 97.418.

Eight teams competed, each consisting of eight swimmers (from a total team of nine swimmers). There was a single round of competition. Each team presents two routines: a technical routine and a free routine. The technical routine consists of twelve required elements, which must be completed in order and within a time of between 2 minutes 35 seconds and 3 minutes 5 seconds. The free routine has no restrictions other than time; this routine must last between 3 minutes 45 seconds and 4 minutes 15 seconds.

For each routine, the team is judged by two panels of five judges each. One panel is the technical jury, the other is the artistic jury. Each judge gives marks of between 0 and 10. The highest and lowest score from each panel are dropped, leaving a total of six scores which are then summed to give the routine's score. The scores of the two routines are then added to give a final score for the team.

== Schedule ==
All times are Beijing Standard Time UTC+8

| Date | Time | Round |
|---|---|---|
| Thursday, August 26, 2004 | 19:30 | Final technical routine |
| Friday, August 27, 2004 | 19:30 | Final free routine |

== Results ==
| Rank | Country | Athletes | Technical | Free | Total |
|---|---|---|---|---|---|
| 1st place, gold medalist(s) | Russia | Elena Azarova, Olga Brusnikina, Anastasia Davydova, Anastasia Ermakova, Elvira Khasyanova, Maria Kiseleva, Olga Novokshchenova, Anna Shorina | 49.667 | 49.834 | 99.501 |
| 2nd place, silver medalist(s) | Japan | Michiyo Fujimaru, Saho Harada, Kanako Kitao, Emiko Suzuki, Miya Tachibana, Miho Takeda, Juri Tatsumi, Yoko Yoneda | 49.167 | 49.334 | 98.501 |
| 3rd place, bronze medalist(s) | United States | Alison Bartosik, Tamara Crow, Erin Dobratz, Rebecca Jasontek, Anna Kozlova, Sara Lowe, Lauren McFall, Stephanie Nesbitt, Kendra Zanotto | 48.584 | 48.834 | 97.418 |
| 4 | Spain | Raquel Corral, Andrea Fuentes, Tina Fuentes, Gemma Mengual, Ana Montero, Irina Rodríguez, Saray Serrano, Paola Tirados | 48.167 | 48.584 | 96.751 |
| 5 | Canada | Erin Chan, Jessica Chase, Jessika Dubuc, Marie-Pierre Gagné, Fanny Létourneau, Shayna Nackoney, Anouk Reniere-Lafreniere, Courtenay Stewart | 47.584 | 47.667 | 95.251 |
| 6 | China | Chen Yu, Gu Beibei, He Xiaochu, Hou Yingli, Hu Ni, Li Zhen, Wang Na, Zhang Xiaohuan | 47.084 | 47.500 | 94.584 |
| 7 | Italy | Monica Cirulli, Costanza Fiorentini, Joey Paccagnella, Elisa Plaisant, Sara Savoia, Beatrice Spaziani, Lorena Zaffalon, Laura Zanazza | 46.834 | 47.250 | 94.084 |
| 8 | Greece | Aglaia Anastasiou, Maria Christodoulou, Eleftheria Ftouli, Eleni Georgiou, Effrosyni Gouda, Apostolia Ioannou, Evgenia Koutsoudi, Olga Pelekanou | 46.250 | 46.500 | 92.750 |
