= Synchronised swimming at the 2001 World Aquatics Championships =

These are the results from the synchronised swimming competition at the 2001 World Aquatics Championships. The competition was only open to women. The competition was held in Japan.

== Medal table ==
Rank	Nation	Gold	Silver	Bronze	Total
1	Russia (RUS)	2	1	0	3
2	Japan (JPN)	1	1	1	3
3	France (FRA)	0	1	0	1
4	Canada (CAN)	0	0	2	2
Totals (4 entries)		3	3	3	9

== Medal summary ==
Event	Gold	Silver	Bronze
Solo routine	Olga Brusnikina (RUS); 99.434	Virginie Dedieu (FRA); 98.287	Miya Tachibana (JPN); 97.870
Duet routine	Miya Tachibana (JPN); Miho Takeda (JPN); 98.910	Anastasia Davydova (RUS); Anastassia Ermakova (RUS); 98.390	Claire Carver-Dias (CAN); Fanny Létourneau (CAN); 96.704
Team routine	Russia (RUS); Anastasia Davydova; Anastassia Ermakova; Irina Tolkatcheva; Elena Ovtchinnikova; Anna Shorina; Elvira Khasyanova; Svetlana Petratchina; Joulia Chestakovitch; Maria Gromova; 98.917	Japan (JPN); Yoko Yoneda; Juri Tatsumi; Michiyo Fujimaru; Satoe Hokoda; Chiaki Watanabe; Naoko Kawashima; Emiko Suzuki; Saho Harada; Miho Takeda; 98.083	Canada (CAN); Claire Carver-Dias; Fanny Létourneau; Catherine Garceau; Erin Chan; Jessica Chase; Lynn Johnson; Amy Caskey; Sara Petrov; Shayna Nackoney; Sarah L. Alexander; 97.453
