= Synchronized swimming at the 2004 Summer Olympics =

Synchronized swimming at the Games of the XXVIII Olympiad
- Venue: Athens Olympic Aquatic Centre
- Dates: 23–27 August 2004
- Competitors: 104 from 24 nations

Synchronized swimming at the 2004 Summer Olympics was held in the Olympic Aquatic Centre where 104 competitors challenged for 2 gold medals in the duet and team events. Each event was made up of a technical and free routine with the points added together to determine the medalists.

== Medal summary ==
Event	Gold	Silver	Bronze
Duet	Anastasia Davydova and Anastasiya Yermakova; Russia	Miya Tachibana and Miho Takeda; Japan	Alison Bartosik and Anna Kozlova; United States
Team	Russia; Yelena Azarova; Olga Brusnikina; Anastasia Davydova; Anastasia Ermakova; Elvira Khasyanova; Maria Kisseleva; Olga Novokshchenova; Anna Shorina; Mariya Gromova	Japan; Michiyo Fujimaru; Saho Harada; Kanako Kitao; Emiko Suzuki; Miya Tachibana; Miho Takeda; Juri Tatsumi; Yoko Yoneda	United States; Alison Bartosik; Tamara Crow; Erin Dobratz; Rebecca Jasontek; Anna Kozlova; Sara Lowe; Lauren McFall; Stephanie Nesbitt; Kendra Zanotto

== Medal table ==
Rank	Nation	Gold	Silver	Bronze	Total
1	Russia	2	0	0	2
2	Japan	0	2	0	2
3	United States	0	0	2	2
Totals (3 entries)		2	2	2	6
