= Tamara Crow =

American synchronized swimmer (born 1977)

Personal information
- Full name: Tamara Clara Crow -deClerq
- Nickname: "Tammy"
- Born: February 3, 1977 (age 49) St. Louis, Missouri, U.S.
- Education: University of California Berkeley
- Occupations: Synchronized swimming coach Lending Officer
- Height: 160 cm (5 ft 3 in)
- Weight: 48 kg (106 lb)
- Spouse: Christopher deClercq

Sport
- Club: Walnut Creek Aquanuts; Santa Clara Aquamaids
- Coached by: Gail Pucci (Aquanuts, age 14-19); Tammy Cleland McGregor (Aquanuts); Chris Carver (Santa Clara)
Medal record
Women's synchronized swimming
Representing the United States
Olympic Games
Bronze medal – third place	2004 Athens	Team

Tamara "Tammy" Crow -deClercq (born February 3, 1977) is an American competitor and coach in synchronized swimming who attended the University of California Berkeley, and won a bronze medal in team competition at the 2004 Athens Olympics.

Crow was born in St. Louis, Missouri, the daughter of Caroline Crow. By High School, Tamara was living in greater Walnut Creek, California. Tamara trained and competed with the exceptional program provided by the Walnut Creek Aquanuts beginning by age eleven and continuing through her High School years. At seventeen she trained with the Aquanuts at Heather Farms Pool in Walnut Creek. While training with the Aquanuts she was managed by 14-19 age group Coach Gail Pucci, Head Coach Tammy Cleland McGregor, and founder and Hall of Fame inductee Gail Emery.

== University of California Berkeley ==
Crow attended the University of California Berkeley where she competed in synchronized swimming, likely in club competition. During her college years, she trained primarily with the Santa Clara Aquamaids synchronized swim team managed by Hall of Fame Coach Chris Carver.

== 2004 Athens Olympics ==
Managed by her former Santa Clara Aquamaids Coach Chris Carver who acted as the Head Olympic coach, Crow won an Olympic bronze medal in the team competition at the 2004 Athens Olympics with the American team earning a total points score of 97.418. She had qualified for the U.S. team in December 2003. The team from the Russian Federation, who were the heavy favorites to win, took the gold medal with a score of 99.501, and the team from Japan took the silver medal with a total points score of 98.501. The American women's synchro team were pleased with their performance as they had not won a medal in the even in 2000. Her 2004 Olympic teammates in synchronized swimming included Anna Kozlova, Alison Bartosik, Rebecca Jasontek, Sara Lowe, Lauren McFall, Stephanie Nesbitt and Kendra Zanotto. Crow was part of the technical routine, helping to score 48.584 for the team, and for the free routine acted as a reserve.

== Vehicular accident ==
On February 16, 2003, Crow was driving a Nissan Pathfinder in the Sierra Nevada on Highway 108 when her car slid off the road, killing two passengers, her then-boyfriend Cody Tatro, and a child in Tatro's care, 12-year-old Brett Slinger. Tatro had earlier promised to drive Slinger back to his parents, but Tatro was inebriated that evening so Crow got behind the wheel. Crow was injured in the accident, with an arm broken in four places, and a badly scraped body. She underwent physical therapy to rehabilitate her arm prior to returning to the Olympic team practices.

Although her blood level did not indicate alcohol at the scene of the accident, her admission to having had drinks the night before led the District Attorney to charge her with two misdemeanors of vehicular manslaughter. Crow pleaded no contest to vehicular manslaughter. The judge allowed Crow to postpone serving her 90-day jail sentence until after the 2004 Summer Olympics. A judge later postponed her incarceration a total of nine months which allowed her both some continued training time, and time to compete in the Olympics. Seven seven weeks after the 2004 Athens Olympic games, beginning on October 25, 2004, she began serving her sentence at Tuolumne County Jail in Sonora, California, near where the accident occurred.Crow was released around November, 2004 after serving 50 days of her sentence.

=== Careers ===
She later married Christopher deClercq. Tamara coached synchronized swimming, and began to coach her former team, the Walnut Creek Aquanuts not long after the 2004 Olympics. She continued to coach the Aquanuts at least through 2011, though she has also served with lending institution Velocity SBA, and Lendistry, a provider of loans to small businesses.

== See also ==
- United States at the Olympics
