= Synchronized swimming at the 2004 Summer Olympics – Women's duet =

Women's duet at the Games of the XXVIII Olympiad
- Aquatic Centre in Athens
- Venue: Athens Olympic Aquatic Centre
- Date: 23–25 August 2004
- Competitors: 48 from 24 nations
- Winning points: 99.334

Medalists
1st place, gold medalist(s)		Anastasia Davydova; Anastasia Ermakova	Russia
2nd place, silver medalist(s)		Miya Tachibana; Miho Takeda	Japan
3rd place, bronze medalist(s)		Alison Bartosik; Anna Kozlova	United States

The women's duet event at the 2004 Summer Olympics in Athens, Greece, took place inside the Athens Olympic Aquatic Centre from 23 to 25 August. Reigning world champions Anastasia Davydova and Anastasia Ermakova of Russia overwhelmed the audience with an extraordinarily synchronous and impressive performance to defend their Olympic title with a final merit of 99.334 points. Japan's Miya Tachibana and Miho Takeda maintained a silver-medal streak in their second Olympics with 98.417, while U.S. duo Anna Kozlova and Alison Bartosik climbed out from behind to earn a bronze with 96.918.

The preliminary phase consisted of a technical routine and a free routine. The scores from the two routines were added together and the top 12 duets qualified for the final.

The final consisted of one free routine, the score from the final free routine was added to the score from the preliminary technical routine to decide the overall winners.

== Schedule ==
All times are Greece Standard Time (UTC+2)

Date	Time	Round
Monday, August 23, 2004	19:30	Preliminary technical routine
Tuesday, August 24, 2004	19:30	Preliminary free routine
Wednesday, August 25, 2004	19:30	Final free routine

== Results ==
=== Qualification ===
Rank	Country	Athlete	Technical	Free	Total
1	Russia	Anastasia Davydova & Anastasia Ermakova	49.417	49.584	99.001
2	Japan	Miya Tachibana & Miho Takeda	49.000	49.000	98.000
3	United States	Alison Bartosik & Anna Kozlova	48.334	48.584	96.918
4	Spain	Gemma Mengual & Paola Tirados	47.917	48.167	96.084
5	France	Virginie Dedieu & Laure Thibaud	47.667	47.584	95.251
6	Canada	Fanny Létourneau & Courtenay Stewart	47.500	46.667	95.167
7	Italy	Beatrice Spaziani & Lorena Zaffalon	46.500	46.917	93.417
8	China	Gu Beibei & Zhang Xiaohuan	46.584	46.750	93.334
9	Greece	Eleftheria Ftouli & Christina Thalassinidou	46.334	46.584	92.918
10	Ukraine	Iryna Gayvoronska & Daria Iushko	45.417	46.084	91.501
11	Switzerland	Magdalena Brunner & Belinda Schmid	45.334	46.000	91.334
12	Brazil	Carolina Moraes & Isabela Moraes	45.167	45.584	90.751
13	Netherlands	Bianca van der Velden & Sonja van der Velden	44.334	44.833	89.167
14	Czech Republic	Soňa Bernardová & Ivana Bursová	43.750	44.334	88.084
14	South Korea	Kim Sung-eun & Yoo Na-mi	43.834	44.334	88.084
16	Mexico	Nara Falcón & Olga Vargas	42.667	43.417	86.084
17	Israel	Anastasia Gloushkov & Inna Yoffe	42.750	43.000	85.750
18	Kazakhstan	Aliya Karimova & Arna Toktagan	42.250	42.667	84.917
19	Belarus	Krystsina Markovich & Nastassia Vlasenka	42.250	42.584	84.834
20	Bulgaria	Assia Anastassova & Bogdana Zareva	41.583	41.834	83.417
21	Egypt	Heba Abdel Gawad & Dalia Allam	41.167	41.667	82.834
22	Slovakia	Veronika Feriancová & Katarína Havlíková	41.167	41.417	82.584
23	Puerto Rico	Luña del Mar Aguiliú & Leilani Torres	39.667	39.917	79.584
24	Australia	Amanda Laird & Leonie Nichols	38.917	38.834	77.751

=== Final ===
Rank	Country	Athlete	Technical	Free	Total
1st place, gold medalist(s)	Russia	Anastasia Davydova & Anastasia Ermakova	49.417	49.917	99.334
2nd place, silver medalist(s)	Japan	Miya Tachibana & Miho Takeda	49.000	49.417	98.417
3rd place, bronze medalist(s)	United States	Alison Bartosik & Anna Kozlova	48.334	48.584	96.918
4	Spain	Gemma Mengual & Paola Tirados	47.917	48.334	96.251
5	France	Virginie Dedieu & Laure Thibaud	47.667	47.917	95.584
6	Canada	Fanny Létourneau & Courtenay Stewart	47.500	47.834	95.334
7	China	Gu Beibei & Zhang Xiaohuan	46.584	47.084	93.668
8	Italy	Beatrice Spaziani & Lorena Zaffalon	46.500	46.750	93.250
9	Greece	Eleftheria Ftouli & Christina Thalassinidou	46.334	46.584	92.918
10	Switzerland	Magdalena Brunner & Belinda Schmid	45.334	46.084	91.418
11	Ukraine	Iryna Gayvoronska & Daria Iushko	45.417	45.834	91.251
12	Brazil	Carolina Moraes & Isabela Moraes	45.167	45.750	90.917
