= Synchronized swimming at the 2003 Pan American Games =

- No. of events: 2

Synchronized swimming at the 2003 Pan American Games was held from 1 August to 17 August 2003 in Santo Domingo, Dominican Republic. There were just two medal events after the exclusion of the solo event.

== Medal table ==
Rank	Nation	Gold	Silver	Bronze	Total
1	United States	2	0	0	2
2	Canada	0	2	0	2
3	Brazil	0	0	2	2
Totals (3 entries)		2	2	2	6

== Medalists ==
Event	Gold	Silver	Bronze
Duet	United States (USA); Alison Bartosik; Anna Kozlova	Canada (CAN); Fanny Létourneau; Courtenay Stewart	Brazil (BRA); Carolina Moraes; Isabela Moraes
Team	United States (USA); Alison Bartosik; Erin Dobratz; Becky Jasontek; Anna Kozlova; Sara Lowe; Lauren McFall; Stephanie Nesbitt; Katie Norris; Kendra Zanotto	Canada (CAN); Lindsay Cargill; Amy Caskey; Erin Chan; Jessica Chase; Marie-Pierre Gagné; Lynn Johnson; Fanny Létourneau; Courtenay Stewart	Brazil (BRA)

== Duet ==
Rank	Synchronized swimmers	Total points
1st place, gold medalist(s)	Alison Bartosik & Anna Kozlova (USA)	95.917
2nd place, silver medalist(s)	Fanny Létourneau & Courtenay Stewart (CAN)	95.584
3rd place, bronze medalist(s)	Carolina Moraes & Isabela Moraes (BRA)	91.833
4	Nara Falcon & Olga Vargas (MEX)	87.834
5	Luna Aguilu & Leilani Torres (PUR)	84.000
6	Eglen Martínez & Ninth Martínez (VEN)	82.833
7	Claudia Cueli & Maricarmen Saleta (DOM)	80.084
8	Nadezhda Gomez & Violeta Mitinian (CRC)	73.084
9	Deevah Leenheer & Kemberly Vinck (ARU)	73.000
10	Florence Corleto & Andrea Esquivel (ESA)	69.334

== Team ==
Rank	Nation	Total points
1st place, gold medalist(s)	United States (USA)	97.000
2nd place, silver medalist(s)	Canada (CAN)	96.416
3rd place, bronze medalist(s)	Brazil (BRA)	91.166
4	Mexico (MEX)	88.250
5	Venezuela (VEN)	84.500
6	Dominican Republic (DOM)	81.250
7	El Salvador (ESA)	68.250
