= Synchronized swimming at the 1999 Pan American Games =

- No. of events: 2

Synchronized swimming at the 1999 Pan American Games, held from July 23 to August 8, 1999, in Winnipeg, Manitoba, Canada. There were just two medal events after the exclusion of the solo event.

== Medal table ==
Rank	Nation	Gold	Silver	Bronze	Total
1	Canada	2	0	0	2
2	United States	0	2	0	2
3	Brazil	0	0	1	1
3	Mexico	0	0	1	1
Totals (4 entries)		2	2	2	6

== Medalists ==
Event	Gold	Silver	Bronze
Duet	Canada (CAN); Claire Carver-Dias; Fanny Létourneau	United States (USA); Rebecca Jasontek; Emily Marsh	Brazil (BRA); Carolina Moraes; Isabela Moraes
Team	Canada (CAN); Lyne Beaumont; Claire Carver-Dias; Jessica Chase; Valérie Hould-Marchand; Kirstin Normand; Jacinthe Taillon; Reidun Tatham; Lesley Wright	United States (USA); Carrie Barton; Bridget Finn; Rebecca Jasontek; Kristina Lum; Emily Marsh; Elicia Marshall; Tuesday Middaugh; Kim Wurzel	Mexico (MEX)

== Duet ==
- Held on August 6, 1999

Rank	Synchronized swimmers	Total points
1st place, gold medalist(s)	Claire Carver-Dias & Fanny Létourneau (CAN)	97.733
2nd place, silver medalist(s)	Rebecca Jasontek & Emily Marsh (USA)	96.467
3rd place, bronze medalist(s)	Carolina Moraes & Isabela Moraes (BRA)	94.667
4	Beatriz Jacobo & Erika Leal (MEX)	92.400
5	Patricia Mitat & Kenia Pérez (CUB)	89.867
6	Jaqueline Gonima & Erika Piedrahita (COL)	88.467
7	Gina Saleta & Maricarmen Saleta (DOM)	85.067
8	Paola Capucci & Cécilia Zunzunegui (ARG)	84.200
9	Jessica Hermans & Amanda Maduro (ARU)	75.400
10	María Pavlovskaya & Dania Zapoyasko (CRC)	74.600

== Team ==
- Held on August 7, 1999

Rank	Nation	Total points
1st place, gold medalist(s)	Canada (CAN)	97.396
2nd place, silver medalist(s)	United States (USA)	97.317
3rd place, bronze medalist(s)	Mexico (MEX)	93.373
4.	Brazil (BRA)	92.489
5.	Cuba (CUB)	91.731
