= 2002 FINA World Junior Synchronised Swimming Championships =

The 8th FINA World Junior Synchronised Swimming Championships was held August 15–18, 2002 in Montreal, Quebec, Canada. The synchronised swimmers are aged between 15 and 18 years old, from 29 nations, swimming in four events: Solo, Duet, Team and Free combination.

== Participating nations ==
29 nations swam at the 2002 World Junior Championships were:

- Australia
- Austria
- Brazil
- Canada
- China
- Colombia
- Costa Rica
- Dominican Republic
- Egypt
- Germany
- Great Britain
- Greece
- Israel
- Italy
- Japan
- Kazakhstan
- Korea
- Malaysia
- Mexico
- Netherlands
- New Zealand
- Russia
- Slovakia
- Spain
- Switzerland
- Ukraine
- USA
- Venezuela
- Yugoslavia

== Results ==
Event	Gold		Silver		Bronze	
Solo details	Natalia Ishchenko; Russia	88.376	Nicole Cargill; Canada	86.596	Tina Fuentes; Spain	86.110
Duet details	Natalia Zlobina; Olga Larkina; Russia	87.264	Courtenay Stewart; Nicole Cargill; Canada	86.608	Sara Lowe; Stephanie Nesbitt (United States) USA	85.724
Team details	Russia	87.511	Japan	85.745	Canada	85.601
Free combination details	Japan	94.600	Canada	94.000	Spain	92.700
