= Erin Chan =

Canadian synchronized swimmer

Personal information
- Born: August 9, 1979 (age 46) Toronto, Ontario, Canada
- Height: 167 cm (5 ft 6 in)
- Weight: 55 kg (121 lb)
Medal record
Synchronised swimming
Representing Canada
Olympic Games
Bronze medal – third place	2000 Sydney	Team event
World Championships
Bronze medal – third place	2001 Fukuoka	Team event

Erin Chan (born August 9, 1979) is a Canadian synchronized swimmer.

Chan began synchronized swimming at age seven. She won a bronze medal at the team event at the 2000 Summer Olympics and at the 2001 world championships in Fukuoka, Japan. Chan also represented Canada in the team event at the 2004 Summer Olympics in Athens, Greece with teammates Courtenay Stewart, Fanny Létourneau, Jessica Chase, Shayna Nackoney, Anouk Reniere-Lafreniere, Marie-Pierre Gagne, Jessika Dubuc and Nicole Cargill. There, the Canadian squad placed 5th.

== Personal life ==
Chan is an alum of Bishop Carroll High School.
