= Vasyukov =

Vasyukov (Russian: Васюков) is a Russian masculine surname, its feminine counterpart is Vasyukova. Notable people with the surname include:

- Kostyantyn Vasyukov (born 1981), Ukrainian sprinter
- Olga Vasyukova (born 1980), Russian synchronized swimmer
