= Synchronized swimming at the 2000 Summer Olympics =

Synchronized swimming at the Games of the XXVII Olympiad
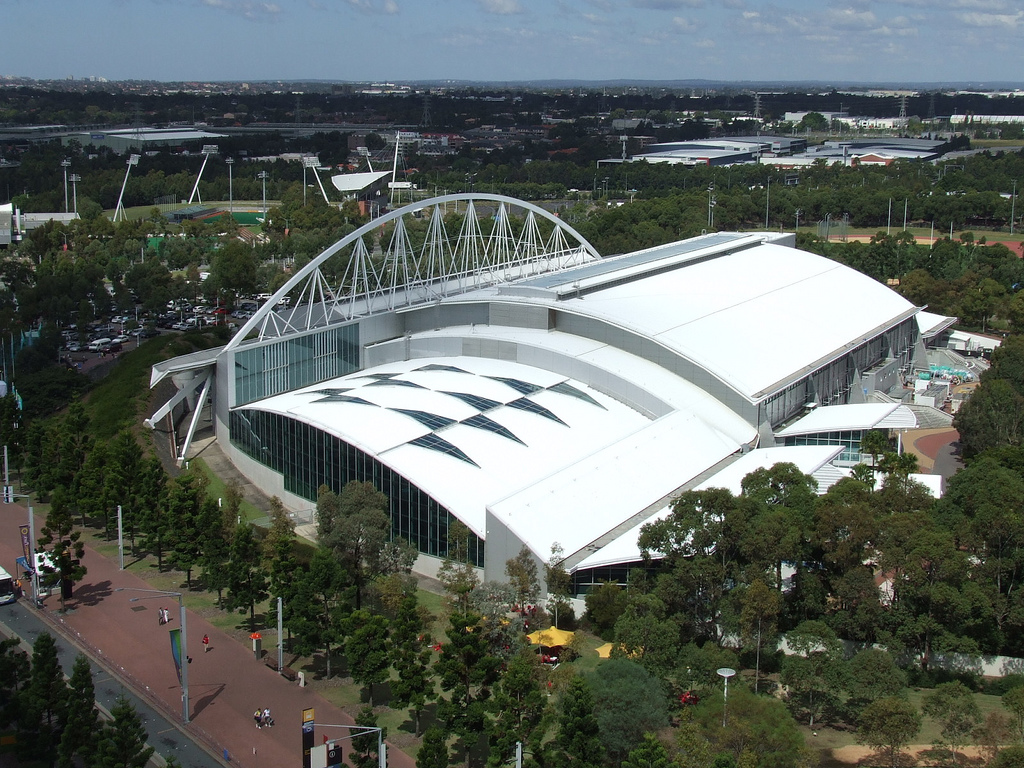
- The Olympic Aquatic Centre
- Venue: Sydney International Aquatic Centre
- Dates: 24 to 29 September 2000
- Competitors: 102 from 24 nations

Synchronized swimming at the 2000 Summer Olympics was held in the Olympic Aquatic Centre where 104 competitors challenged for 2 gold medals in the duet and team events. Each event was made up of a technical and free routine with the points added together to determine the medalists.

== Medal summary ==
Event	Gold	Silver	Bronze
Duet	Olga Brusnikina and Mariya Kiselyova; Russia	Miya Tachibana and Miho Takeda; Japan	Virginie Dedieu and Myriam Lignot; France
Team	Russia; Yelena Azarova; Olga Brusnikina; Maria Kisseleva; Olga Novokshchenova; Irina Pershina; Yelena Soya; Yuliya Vasilyeva; Olga Vasyukova; Yelena Antonova	Japan; Ayano Egami; Raika Fujii; Yoko Isoda; Rei Jimbo; Miya Tachibana; Miho Takeda; Yoko Yoneda; Yuko Yoneda; Juri Tatsumi	Canada; Lyne Beaumont; Claire Carver-Dias; Erin Chan; Catherine Garceau; Fanny Létourneau; Kirstin Normand; Jacinthe Taillon; Reidun Tatham; Jessica Chase

== Medal table ==
Rank	Nation	Gold	Silver	Bronze	Total
1	Russia	2	0	0	2
2	Japan	0	2	0	2
3	Canada	0	0	1	1
3	France	0	0	1	1
Totals (4 entries)		2	2	2	6
