= Synchronised swimming at the 2002 Commonwealth Games =

- Venue: Manchester Aquatics Centre
- Location: Manchester, England
- Dates: 25 July to 4 August 2002

Synchronised swimming at the 2002 Commonwealth Games was the fifth appearance of Synchronised swimming at the Commonwealth Games. Competition was held in Manchester, England, from 25 July to 4 August 2002.

The synchronised swimming events were held at the Manchester Aquatics Centre.

There were just two medal events, both for women. Canada topped the medal table by virtue of winning both gold medals.

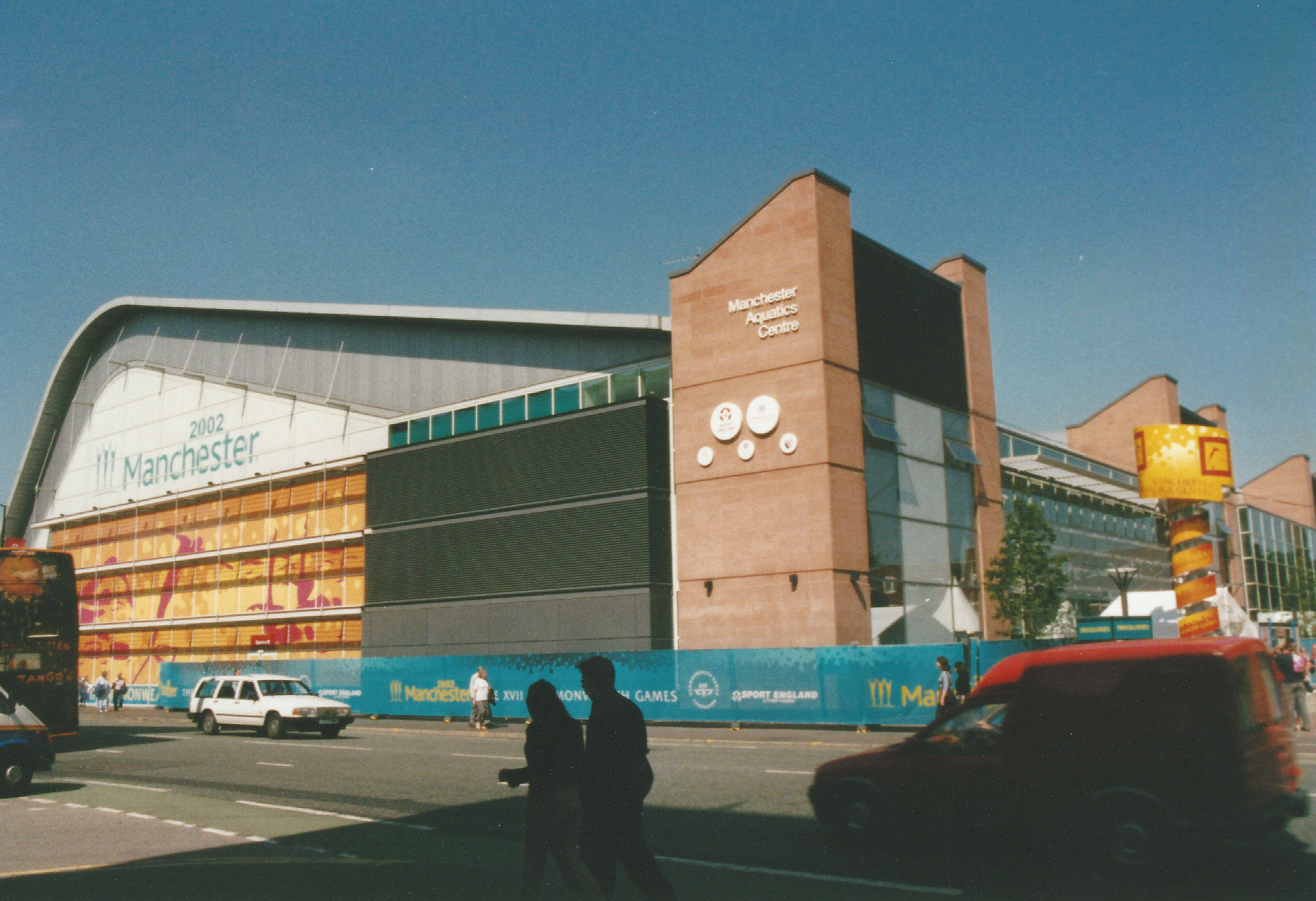
Manchester Aquatics Centre during the Games

== Medal table ==
| Rank | Nation | Gold | Silver | Bronze | Total |
|---|---|---|---|---|---|
| 1 | Canada | 2 | 0 | 0 | 2 |
| 2 | England* | 0 | 2 | 0 | 2 |
| 3 | Australia | 0 | 0 | 2 | 2 |
| Totals (3 entries) | | 2 | 2 | 2 | 6 |

== Medallists ==
=== Women's events only ===
| Event | Gold | | Silver | | Bronze | |
|---|---|---|---|---|---|---|
| Solo | Claire Carver-Dias; Canada | 93.834 | Gayle Adamson; England | 87.917 | Naomi Young; Australia | 85.834 |
| Duet | Claire Carver-Dias and Fanny Létourneau; Canada | 94.417 | Gayle Adamson & Katie Hooper; England | 88.167 | Ashleigh Rudder & Naomi Young; Australia | 85.917 |
