= Bishop Carroll High School (Calgary) =

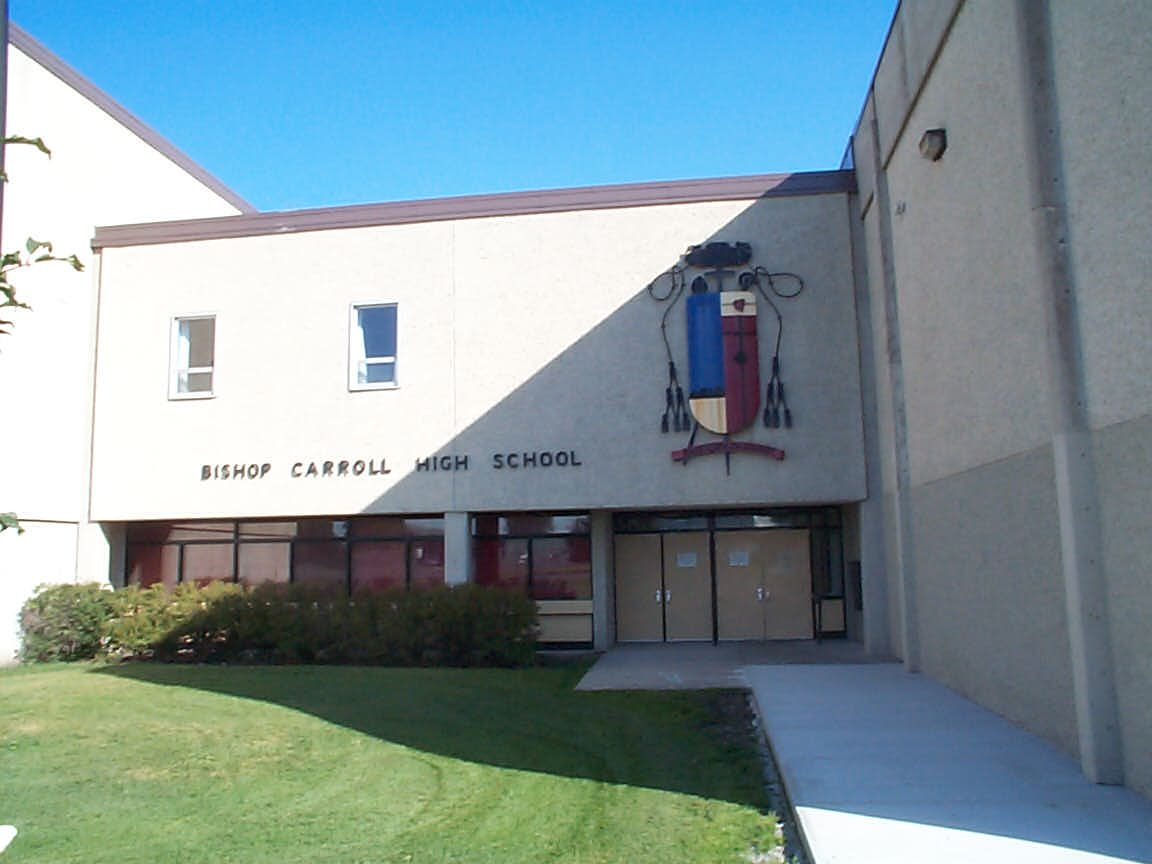
- Front Entrance of School

Location
- 4624 Richard Road S.W. (Area A/Ward 11); Calgary, Alberta; Canada; 51.012°N 114.120°W

Information
- School type: Separate secondary
- Motto: Mane nobiscum, Domine ("Stay with us, Lord")
- Religious affiliation: Roman Catholic
- Established: 1971
- School board: Calgary Catholic School District
- Principal: Dave McFarland
- Staff: 80
- Grades: 10–12
- Enrolment: 1,350 around
- Colours: Red and Yellow
- Mascot: Cardinals
- Special programs: Continuous Progress; Self-directed Learning
- Website: www.cssd.ab.ca/schools/bishopcarroll/Pages/default.aspx/

Bishop Carroll High School is a Canadian Catholic high school that is part of the Calgary Catholic School District in Alberta. The school is named after Francis Patrick Carroll, the Bishop of Calgary from 1935 to 1966. The school welcomes students who are not Catholic but all pupils are expected to complete religious studies courses.

Bishop Carroll's athletic teams are nicknamed the Cardinals.

== Curriculum ==
The school offers a unique program that allows students to work at their own pace in an individual environment. This self-directed learning is part of the constructivist model of student-centered learning advocated by member schools of the Canadian Coalition of Self-Directed Learning (CCSDL).

The school is a member of the Action for Bright Children Society.

== History ==
Opened in 1971, Bishop Carroll High School was the first school in Canada to offer a program based on the CCSDL fundamental practices of personalized programming, flexible scheduling, continuous progress, mastery learning and a Teacher Advisory Program. In 2011, Mount Royal University signed a Memorandum of Agreement with Bishop Carroll High School to build on a history of cooperation between the two institutions in order to enhance a working relationship that will increase educational opportunities for students. The MOU allows discussions to commence between the parties to offer specific courses at the high school (dual credit courses). Bishop Carroll High School students beginning in 2013 got a head start on their University studies with the successful completion of Critical Reading and Writing, a university-level credit course offered jointly by Mount Royal University and Bishop Carroll High School. This course was the first of its kind, and is part of a plan of continuing cooperation between the University and Bishop Carroll High School in many disciplines. In 2015, this MRU-BCHS course became dual credit.

== Student Services Department ==
Three full-time counsellors offer a Comprehensive School Counselling program, which meet the needs of student in three basic domains: academic development, career development, and personal/social development. In 2014, Mount Royal University and partner school Bishop Carroll joined together to raise awareness about, and change the culture of, bullying. Who's Frank? is an initiative determined to change hearts and minds through the power of stories and inspire action against bullying.

== Fine arts and performing arts ==
=== Music department ===
The Bishop Carroll Music Society (BCMS) is an independently-run organization directed by parent volunteers and faculty from the department of music at the school; it funds, promotes, and supports the music program and all its members. The music program consists of a Concert Choir, a Treble Choir & Auditioned Chamber Choir, Vocal Jazz Ensemble, Gold and Ruby Jazz Ensembles, four string orchestras (Beginner Strings, Intermezzo Strings, Cantabile Strings, and Virtuosi Strings), a Concert Band, Auditioned Touring Band, Wind Ensemble and Symphonic Band, 1:00 Jazz band and 2:00 Jazz Bands and in 2014 added a Symphony Orchestra. This is the only high school in Calgary with an Orchestra. In December 2017, the Virtuosi Strings were invited to perform at The Midwest Clinic, an International Band and Orchestra Conference in Chicago, IL.

=== School of Alberta Ballet ===
Bishop Carroll is one of two Calgary schools that has a relationship with The School of Alberta Ballet. Ballet students at Bishop Carroll and Queen Elizabeth High (in the public system) may receive credit toward their high school diploma for the instruction they receive at ballet school.

== Student body ==
=== 2008 Lockdown ===
Bishop Carroll was locked down for approximately four hours on December 12, 2008. No threat was found and students were released.

=== 2016 Lockdown ===
Bishop Carroll was locked down for approximately two hours on September 20, 2016. Once again, Police "found nothing out of the ordinary". Certain sources claim that a "bomb threat" was made to the school, while others say that the threat was "unspecified". A very similar lockdown happened at Bishop Grandin at the same time, but "Police say the calls to the schools were unrelated". No one was harmed, and all students were released.

== Notable alumni ==
- Amanda Billings - Figure skater.
- Anastasia Bucsis - Speed Skater. Competed in the 2010 Winter Olympics in Vancouver in the Women's 500 metre.
- Erin Chan and Shayna Nackoney - Synchronized swimmers who won a bronze medal at the team event at the 2001 world championships in Fukuoka, Japan.
- Mark Dewit - Was drafted in the 6th round, 42nd overall to the Toronto Argonauts in the 2008 round.
- Lindsay Ell - Country Music Singer/Songwriter. Graduated as valedictorian in 2006.
- Jeromy Farkas - Mayor of Calgary and former Calgary city councillor for Ward 11 elected in the Calgary municipal election, 2017
- Leslie Feist, known as Feist, singer/songwriter, founded a punk band named Placebo at Bishop Carroll before switching to Alternative High School.
- Jim Henderson - Major League Baseball pitcher with the Milwaukee Brewers.
- James Keelaghan - Folk Singer/Songwriter. Juno Award winner
- Laureen Harper, Married to The 22nd Prime Minister of Canada Stephen Harper
- Julie Nolke - Comedian/Internet Personality. Her main YouTube channel has over one million subscribers.
- Warren Kinsella - Lawyer, author, and political consultant; who advised former Prime Minister Jean Chrétien.
- John Kucera - Previously on the Canadian National Ski Team. Member of the 2006 Canadian Olympic Team. 2005/2006 National Super G Champion. 2005 National Downhill Champion. 2006 National GS Champion
- Dana Murzyn - An NHL defenceman who, in 1985, was the first round draft pick of the Hartford Whalers. He was later traded to the Calgary Flames where he was a member of the 1989 Stanley Cup championship team.
- Curtis Myden - Olympic bronze medallist swimmer in three consecutive Summer Olympics starting in 1992.
- Nattie Neidhart - Professional wrestler in WWE
- Alison Redford - Premier of Alberta and leader of Progressive Conservative Party of Alberta from 2011 to 2014.
- Chris Renaud - Medal winning swimmer in the 1994 and 1998 Commonwealth Games. He also competed in the 2000 Olympics and has won multiple Canadian championships.
- Jeff Schultz - NHL defenceman with the Washington Capitals. Played with the Calgary Hitmen while attending Bishop Carroll, and graduated in 2004.
- Tyler Seitz - Competed in the 1998 and 2002 Olympics in luge.
- Tyler Sloan - Professional hockey player with the Washington Capitals, Milwaukee Admirals, Hershey Bears. Graduated in 1999
- Danielle Smith - Broadcaster and former leader of the provincial Wildrose Party, 19th Premier of Alberta.
- Michael Soroka - Major League Baseball pitcher with the Atlanta Braves.
- Mark Tewksbury - Olympic gold medallist in 1992 Summer Olympics in 100 meter backstroke
- Hayley Wickenheiser - Olympic gold medallist with the Canadian Women's National Hockey Team at the 2002, 2006 and 2010 Winter games.
- Ryan Yip - Professional Golf Player on the Canadian Tour. Played on Kent State Golf Team. Quarter-finalist in the 2005 U.S. Amateur. Semi-finalist in the 2006 U.S. Amateur
- Dominick Zator - Professional soccer player. Has competed in the Canadian Premier League for Cavalry FC and across Europe.
