= Gabriel Gardner =

American volleyball player (born 1976)

Gabe Gardner

Personal information
- Born: Gabriel Bryan Gardner; March 18, 1976 (age 50); San Diego, California, U.S.
- Height: 6 ft 9 in (206 cm)
- Education: University of Southern California, Stanford University

Volleyball information
- Position: Opposite

National team
United States
Medal record
Men's volleyball
Representing the United States
Olympic Games
Gold medal – first place	2008 Beijing	Team competition
FIVB World League
Gold medal – first place	2008 Rio de Janeiro	Team competition
Bronze medal – third place	2007 Katowice	Team competition

Gabriel Bryan Gardner (born March 18, 1976) is an American professional volleyball player. He is a two-time Olympian, having played at the 2004 Athens Olympics and 2008 Beijing Olympics with the U.S. national team.

Gardner graduated from San Clemente High School, where he went on to the University of Southern California, playing for the USC Trojans volleyball team in 1996–97. He then transferred to Stanford University, where due to NCAA transfer rules he sat out the 1998 season before playing for the Cardinal in 1999. Gardner also played water polo as a goalie in addition to being an accomplished volleyball player at the high school level. He is married to Olympic bronze medalist Lauren McFall Gardner, who was the team captain of the 2004 Olympic synchronized swimming team.
