= Magdalena Brunner =

Swiss synchronized swimmer

Personal information
- Born: 10 April 1983 (age 43) Glarus, Switzerland

Sport
- Sport: Synchronised swimming

Magdalena Brunner (born 10 April 1983) is a Swiss synchronized swimmer who competed in the 2004 Summer Olympics and in the 2008 Summer Olympics.
