= Iryna Gayvoronska =

Ukrainian synchronized swimmer

Personal information
- Nationality: Ukraine
- Born: 4 January 1983 (age 43) Nizhny Tagil, Russian SSR, Soviet Union
- Height: 1.73 m (5 ft 8 in)
- Weight: 62 kg (137 lb)

Sport
- Sport: Swimming
- Strokes: Synchronized swimming
- Club: Dynamo Kharkiv
- Updated on 2 August 2015

Iryna Gayvoronska (born 4 January 1983) is a Ukrainian synchronized swimmer who competed in the women's duet at the 2004 Summer Olympics.
