= Olga Brusnikina =

Russian synchronized swimmer

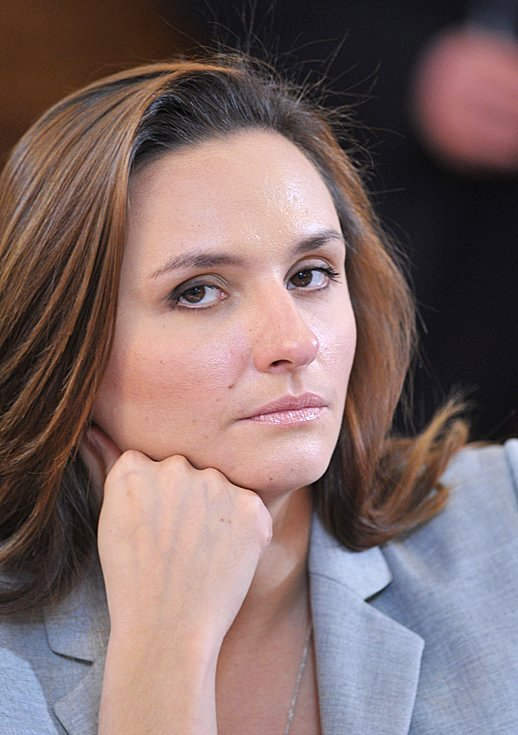
- Olga Brusnikina in 2012

Personal information
- Born: 9 November 1978 (age 47) Moscow, Russian SFSR, Soviet Union
- Height: 1.69 m (5 ft 7 in)
- Weight: 55 kg (121 lb)

Sport
- Sport: Synchronised swimming
- Club: MGFSO-Dynamo, Moscow
Medal record
Representing Russia
Olympic Games
Gold medal – first place	2000 Sydney	Duet
Gold medal – first place	2000 Sydney	Team
Gold medal – first place	2004 Athens	Team
World Championships
Gold medal – first place	1998 Perth	Duet
Gold medal – first place	1998 Perth	Team
Gold medal – first place	2001 Fukuoka	Solo
Gold medal – first place	2003 Barcelona	Team

Olga Aleksandrovna Brusnikina (Russian: Ольга Александровна Брусникина; born 9 November 1978) is a Russian competitor in synchronised swimming and three times Olympic champion.

She first attracted attention when, at the age of 14, she performed a solo routine at the 1993 World Junior Synchro championships. Upon the addition of team synchronised swimming to the list of Olympic events in 1996, Brusnikina was a member of the Russian team which came fourth. She won gold medal in duet with Mariya Kiselyova at the 2000 Summer Olympics in Sydney. She was part of the Russian winning team in 2000, and again at the 2004 Summer Olympics in Athens.

In September 2001, Brusnikina married Sergey Yevstigneyev, an Olympic water polo player and national coach whom she first met in 1994. After marriage, they lived for a few years in Italy, where Yevstigneyev played for a local team and Brusnikina coached synchronized swimming.

Brusnikina retired shortly after the 2004 Olympics, and on 14 August 2006 gave birth to a son, Iliya. After that she coached synchronized swimming in Moscow Oblast and worked as an international referee. Currently, she is a member of the Government Commission on Physical Education and Sport and of the Russian Olympic Committee.

Since 6 December 2022, she has headed the Synchronized Swimming Federation of the Russian Federation.

== Awards ==
In 2001, she was awarded the Order of Honour.

== See also ==
- List of members of the International Swimming Hall of Fame
