= Anna Kozlova =

Russian/American synchronized swimmer

Personal information
- Full name: Anna A. Kozlova
- National team: Soviet Union; Russia; United States
- Born: 30 December 1972 (age 53) Leningrad, Soviet Union

Sport
- Sport: Synchronized swimming
- Club: Santa Clara Aquamaids
- Coached by: Chris Carver (SC Aquamaids, 2000-2004 Olympics)
Medal record
Women's synchronized swimming
Representing the Soviet Union
European Championships
Gold medal – first place	1991 Athens	Duet
Gold medal – first place	1991 Athens	Team
World Cup
Bronze medal – third place	1991 Bonn	Team
Representing Russia
European Championships
Gold medal – first place	1993 Sheffield	Duet
Gold medal – first place	1993 Sheffield	Team
World Cup
Silver medal – second place	1993 Lausanne	Duet
Representing the United States
Olympic Games
Bronze medal – third place	2004 Athens	Duet
Bronze medal – third place	2004 Athens	Team Competition
World Aquatics Championships
Silver medal – second place	2003 Barcelona	Free Combination
Bronze medal – third place	2003 Barcelona	Team Competition
World Cup
Bronze medal – third place	2002 Zurich	Team
Pan American Games
Gold medal – first place	2003 Santo Domingo	Duet
Gold medal – first place	2003 Santo Domingo	Team Competition

Anna Kozlova (Russian: Анна Козлова; born 30 December 1972) is a former synchronized swimmer who competed in three Olympic Games. After competing in the 1992 Summer Olympics and winning four European Championships representing the Soviet Union and its successor organizations, she defected to the United States in 1993. After missing the 1996 Atlanta Games due to a five-year wait to receive U.S. citizenship, she competed for her new country in Sydney, where her best placing was fourth. She went on to win gold medals in the Pan-American Games in 2003, before returning to her third and final Olympics in Athens, where she won two bronze medals.

== Early life ==
Kozlova was born in Leningrad, RFSFR, Soviet Union on December 30, 1972, the daughter of a mathematics professor and a swimming instructor. By 1993, Kozlova trained with the Santa Clara Aquamaids under Hall of Fame Head Coach Gail Emery.

== Early international career ==
Kozlova's first international competition was at the 1989 World Cup in Paris, where although she failed to win a medal, she would later credit her impression of the American team at that competition as influencing her 1993 decision to defect to the United States. (Note: Note that while Almond's article refers to this event as a World Championships, the World Aquatics Championships were not contested in 1989; the two closest being in 1986 and 1991, neither of which fit with the rest of Almond's article, including the age he indicates Kozlova was at the time.)

Kozlova found success in two international competitions in 1991. At the World Cup in Bonn, she won a bronze medal with the Soviet team, and at 1991 European Aquatics Championships in Athens, she paired with Olga Sedakova to win the gold medal in the duet routine competition. The Soviet team also captured the team gold medal. Following the breakup of the Soviet Union, twelve of the former Soviet Republics chose to compete together at the 1992 Summer Olympics in Barcelona as the Unified Team. Kozlova was chosen to compete in both competitions contested, solo and duet, the duet again with Sedakova.

Kozlova's performance in the solo competition was unremarkable, as she failed to advance past the first day of competition. However, the duet with Sedakova was much better, as the team finished in fourth place, one shy of the medals. Remarkably, Kozlova and Sedakova had to finish the duet competition without a coach, as their coach abandoned them part-way through the three-day competition.

In January 1993, Kozlova and Sedakova traveled to the United States to train on a temporary visa, where they lived with the family of Atlanta gold medalists and sisters; Becky Dyroen-Lancer and Suzannah Bianco. Returning to Russia, she competed at the 1993 European Aquatics Championships in Sheffield that August. Leaving the Unified Team concept behind, Russia competed as an independent nation. Kozlova partnered with Sedakova for the final time at the Sheffield competition, but they repeated their success from 1991, and captured the duet gold medal. The Russian team also won the gold medal, their first of eight consecutive they would eventually win.

== In the United States ==
Shortly after the European Championships in 1993, Kozlova flew to California to attend U.S. Olympic 1996 synchronized team event gold medalist Suzannah Bianco's wedding. Kozlova received her green card in 1994, which allowed her to work in the United States, after receiving a gift to pay for an immigration lawyer from a man in a diner who overheard her talking to Carver. As a result of this decision, Kozlova was unable to participate in international competition until she received her U.S. citizenship, which received on 7 October 1999. While training with the Santa Clara, California club team, the Santa Clara Aquamaids as noted earlier, she won national titles in solo, duet, and team competitions multiple times.

Because of the timing of her citizenship application, Kozlova's first major competition as an American was the 2000 Summer Olympics in Sydney, and at age 27, she competed at the Olympics under the U.S. flag. In the duet competition, Kozlova partnered with Tuesday Middaugh to take fourth place out of 24 pairs competing. As part of the United States team, she placed fifth in the team competition. This was the first Olympics the United States did not win a medal in synchronized swimming.

At the 2002 World Cup in Zurich, Kozlova won her first international medal as an American, winning bronze in the team competition. For the 2003 World Aquatics Championships in Barcelona Kozlova participated in three events. With new partner Alison Bartosik, she placed fourth in the duet competition. It was in Barcelona that Kozlova won her first world championship medals with a silver medal in the free combination team event, and a bronze medal in the team technical competition. For the 2003 Pan American Games Kozlova won two gold medals; with Bartosik she won the duet competition, and they both were part of the U.S. team that won the team competition.

The crescendo of Kozlova's career was at the 2004 Summer Olympics in Athens. For the duet competition, Kozlova again partnered with Bartosik. The partnership finished in third place in each of the three routines, which resulted in them finishing third overall, earning them a bronze medal. Two nights later, Kozlova won another bronze medal, in the team competition.
