= Jessika Dubuc =

Canadian synchronized swimmer

Personal information
- Born: June 26, 1983 (age 43) Montreal, Quebec, Canada

Sport
- Sport: Swimming
- Strokes: Synchronised swimming
Medal record
Women's synchronised swimming
Representing Canada
Pan American Games
Silver medal – second place	2003 Santo Domingo	Team
Silver medal – second place	2007 Rio de Janeiro	Team

Jessika Dubuc (born June 26, 1983) was a Canadian synchronized swimmer.

== Career ==
She finished in fourth place at the 2003 world championships at Barcelona, Spain in the free routine combination event. She is a two-time Olympian, finishing fourth in 2004 Summer Olympics and fifth in 2008 Summer Olympics, both in the team events. Dubuc won two silver medals at the Pan American Games, one in 2003 and one in 2007. She retired from synchronized swimming in October 2008.
