= Eleftheria Ftouli =

Greek synchronized swimmer

Personal information
- Nationality: Greece
- Born: 4 July 1981 (age 45) Volos, Greece
- Height: 1.71 m (5 ft 7 in)
- Weight: 56 kg (123 lb)

Sport
- Sport: Swimming
- Strokes: Synchronized swimming
- Club: Panellinios GS
Medal record
Representing Greece
European Championships
Bronze medal – third place	2004 Madrid	Team, free routine
Bronze medal – third place	2006 Budapest	Duet
- Updated on 2 June 2024

Eleftheria Ftouli (born 4 July 1981) is a Greek former synchronized swimmer who competed in the women's duet at the 2004 Summer Olympics.
