= Erin Dobratz =

American synchronized swimmer

Personal information
- Full name: Erin Patricia Dobratz -McGregor
- Nationality: United States
- Born: 19 October 1982 (age 43) Concord, California, United States
- Occupations: IT Manager, IT Entrepreneur; Digital Asset Management
- Height: 167 cm (5 ft 6 in)
- Weight: 63 kg (139 lb)
- Spouse: Chris McGregor

Sport
- Event: Synchronized swimming
- College team: Stanford University (USA)
- Club: Walnut Creek Aquanuts
- Coached by: Pam Edwards (Aquanuts); Heather Pease-Olson (Stanford)
Medal record
Women's synchronized swimming
Representing the United States
Olympic Games
Bronze medal – third place	2004 Athens	Team
World Championships
Silver medal – second place	2003 Barcelona	Combination
Bronze medal – third place	2003 Barcelona	Team
Pan American Games
Gold medal – first place	2003 Santo Domingo	Team

Erin Patricia Dobratz (born October 19, 1982 in Concord, California), later known by her married name Erin McGregor, is a retired American synchronized swimmer who trained with the Walnut Creek Aquanuts, competed for Stanford, and won a bronze medal in the team event in synchronized swimming at the 2004 Athens Olympics. After her athletic career, she worked as an executive and entrepreneur in the field of digital asset technology.

== Early life and competition ==
Born October 18, 1982 in Concord, California, to Carl and Judy Dobratz, Erin graduated Concord's Clayton Valley High School in 2000, and swam for Clayton Valley High, likely in freestyle events where she gained endurance, an essential skill required for synchronized swimmers. She trained in synchronized swimming with the Walnut Creek Aquanuts and was coached throughout High School by Head Aquanuts Coach Gail Pucci and Pamela Edwards. The Aquanuts program was earlier founded by Hall of Fame Coach Gail Emery. Beginning her participation in synchronized swimming with the Aquanuts by the age of nine, from 1999-2000, she became a member of the U.S. Junior National Team member as a High School upperclassman, training with the team primarily in the summer months. With challenging practice schedules, as a member of the U.S. Junior National team, Dobratz would train up to 10 hours daily, significantly more than her training sessions with the Walnut Creek Aquanuts B-team during the school year. With her demanding travel schedule, Dobratz often needed to take high school midterms or final exams before her classmates, to prevent them from conflicting from her competitions. Around sixteen in 1998, she captured gold in America's Cup team competition. In 1998, she also placed second at the Jr. Nationals in team competition, and at the U.S. Open finished second in team competition while placing third in duet as an individual competitor.

=== 2000 Olympic trials ===
At the end of her High School Junior year at Clayton, she was not selected to participate in the 2000 Sydney Olympics, though at 16, she was the youngest American synchronized swimmer to qualify for the 1999 Olympic trials in Federal, Washington. As a Walnut Creek Aquanut B-swimmer, she trained 3-4 hours daily, usually six days a week. Her Aquanuts Coach, Pamela Edwards noted that her coordination and athletic ability were exceptional for a sixteen-yard old competitor.

== Stanford University ==
She attended Stanford University from 2001-2005, intending to graduate in communications. She competed for the Stanford Cardinal women's synchronized swimming team where she was coached by Heather Pease-Olson, a 1996 Olympic gold medalist in synchronized swimming who as coach led the Stanford women to four NCAA Championships between 2001-2012. Like Dobratz, Pease had formerly competed and trained in synchronized swimming with both the Aquanuts and Stanford where she was an All-American in 1997-98. In fraternal organizations, Dobratz was a member of Pi Beta Phi Sorority. Accomplished in her collegiate career, in 2001 she placed third in duet and second in team at the America's Cup.At Collegiate Nationals for the 2002 season, Erin captured a third place in Duet, trio, and team competition. In her early years at Stanford in 2001, she was an Academic All-American, and in collegiate nationals that year captured a second overall place in competition with second places in team, duet and trio. She took time off from Stanford in the 2003-2004 season to prepare for the 2004 Olympics. At a high point in her collegiate career in 2003, she was selected to train with the 2004 Olympic squad.

== International competition ==
She shared a silver medal in the combination routine, and captured a bronze for the Americans in the team event at the 2003 FINA World Championships in Barcelona, Spain. In that same year, Dobratz added a gold to her career hardware in the group competition at the Pan American Games in Santo Domingo, Dominican Republic.

== 2004 Athens Olympic bronze medal ==
Dobratz qualified for the women's team routine, as a member of the American squad, at the 2004 Summer Olympics in Athens. She took a year off from her studies at Stanford to prepare for the games. With Dobratz's participation, the Americans secured a third-place technical merit score of 48.584 points, and had a free routine of 48.834 to accumulate a total score of 97.418, placing third in the women's team event for the bronze. The Russian team took the gold, with the team from Japan taking the silver medal.

=== Marriage ===
According to one newspaper article, while living in greater San Francisco, Erin married Chris McGregor, opting for a simple civil ceremony at the San Francisco courthouse. Very few publications confirm the exact date of her wedding as there was likely no wedding announcement, though several publications list her married name as McGregor. At the time McGregor was around 36, and Erin was 26, and working as a web-site project manager in San Francisco, only around 30 miles from her native Concord.

=== Post-swimming careers ===
Dobratz-McGregor used her Stanford degree in communications to work as an entrepreneur and executive in the field of digital asset technology. Digital assets include videos, images, documents, audio, cryptocurrencies, software code, and NFT's, which are primarily digital indentifiers of ownership. A rather broad field, digital asset management includes the storage and management of digital assets, tools that protect digital assets, ensuring proper copyright and liscensing, and distribution, reuse and archiving of digital assets. In a simpler definition, digital assets are anything in digital form that have usage rights, or a specific form of permission for use.
