= Jill Sudduth =

American synchronized swimmer

Personal information
- Born: Jill Sabrina Sudduth; September 9, 1971 (age 54) Baltimore, Maryland, U.S.
- Education: San Jose State University

Sport
- Club: Santa Clara Aquamaids
- Coached by: Chris Carver (SC Aquamaids, 96 Olympics)
Medal record
Synchronized swimming
Representing the United States
Olympic Games
Gold medal – first place	1996 Atlanta	Team
World Championships
Gold medal – first place	1994 Rome	Duet
Gold medal – first place	1994 Rome	Team
Pan American Games
Gold medal – first place	1995 Mar del Plata	Duet

Jill Sabrina Sudduth (born September 9, 1971, in Baltimore, Maryland), also known as Jill Sudduth Smith, is an American competitor in synchronized swimming and 1996 Atlanta Olympic gold medalist in the synchronized team event. Sudduth attended college at San Jose State University, and most of her training from the Santa Clara Aquamaids team coached by Hall of Fame Coach Chris Carver. A Junior National titlist, she began competing for the U.S. National team around 1986.

== Early life ==
Sudduth was born September 9, 1971 in Baltimore, Maryland, but spent her teen years in Morgan Hill, California, where she attended Morgan Hill's Live Oak High School, graduating in 1989.

Representing the Santa Clara Aquamaids by May 1985 at age 13, she competed in the semi-finals of the Duet Competition at the Contra Costa International Sports Festival, in Concord, California. Sudduth continued to train for elite competition with the strong Santa Clara Aquamaids team, where she received coaching from Hall of Fame Coach Chris Carver, and joined the U.S. National team around 1986. During her peak years with the National Team, Sudduth trained as many as seven hours daily, most frequently six days a week. Sudduth was soon winning Junior National titles, and by her High School Senior year, became World Duet and Team Champion in Junior competition.

Sudduth attended San Jose State University in the early 1990's, where she was a Marine Biology Major, and within driving distance of the Santa Clara Aquamaids where she continued to train.

In 1991, Sudduth recovered from a wrist injury, but it did not long affect her achievements in elite competition.

== International competition highlights ==
In the 1990's Sudduth competed with great success with her duet partner Becky Dyroen-Lancer. Between 1993-96, they were undefeated in syncro duet competitive events. She won several international gold medals, including golds in duet with Becky Dyroen-Lancer, at the 1995 Pan American Games in Mar del Plata, Argentina. Dyroen-Lancer was also coached by Carver with the Aquamaids She also won gold medals in both duet and group at the 1994 World Championships in Rome. At the 1994 World Championships, Sudduth was second in the medal count only to her American Aquamaids partner Becky-Dyroen Lancer. Sudduth also won a group title at the 1989 FINA World Cup.

== 1996 Atlanta Olympics ==
Coached by Chris Carver, Sudduth competed for the American team that received a gold medal in team competition in synchronized swimming at the late July-early August 1996 Summer Olympics in Atlanta. Sudduth's U.S. Synchronized team was the first and only to receive a perfect score of 100 in Olympic team competition. The Canadian team received the silver medal, and the bronze went to Japan, with the three teams recording a finish in same order they had at the World Championships in 1994.

At the height of her career from 1994-1998, Sudduth captured 16 major competitions at the international level. These included the German, Swiss, and French, Open tournaments, and the World Cup. As noted earlier, she also took the Pan Pacific Championships during this period, and the World Championships Team event in 1991. She retired from elite competition in the early 2000's.

=== Honors ===
Sudduth was inducted into the International Swimming Hall of Fame in 2012. In 1993, Sudduth was a World Synchronized Swimmer of the Year. From 1990-1995, she earned honors as an All American Synchronized Swimmer of the Year.

In a later career in Las Vegas, Sudduth was a Cirque du Soleil performer, with the program Journey of Man.
