= Shayna Nackoney =

Canadian synchronized swimmer

Personal information
- Born: April 24, 1982 (age 44) Winnipeg, Canada

Sport
- Sport: Synchronised swimming
Medal record
Representing Canada
World Championships
Bronze medal – third place	2001 Fukuoka	Team Event
Pan American Games
Silver medal – second place	2003 Santo Domingo	Team

Shayna Nackoney Skauge (born April 24, 1982) is a Canadian synchronized swimmer. She began synchronized swimming in 1989. She won a bronze medal at the team event at the 2001 world championships in Fukuoka, Japan. She was a member of the 2004 Canadian Olympic Synchronized Swimming Team.

She then went on to perform with the O Show in Las Vegas. Shayna now is a mentor and coach to athletes and synchronized swimming clubs coaching and leading performance focused workshops. Shayna's commitment to lifelong athleticism and sport is ongoing. Information as of November 2021

== Personal life ==
Born in Winnipeg, Manitoba, Skauge is an alumna of Bishop Carroll High School.
