= Synchronised swimming at the 2003 World Aquatics Championships =

These are the results from the synchronised swimming competition at the 2003 World Aquatics Championships.

== Medal summary ==
| Event | Gold | Silver | Bronze |
|---|---|---|---|
| Solo routine | Virginie Dedieu (FRA); 99.251 | Anastasiya Yermakova (RUS); 97.417 | Gemma Mengual (ESP); 97.334 |
| Duet routine | Anastasia Davydova (RUS); Anastasiya Yermakova (RUS); 99.084 | Miya Tachibana (JPN); Miho Takeda (JPN); 98.084 | Gemma Mengual (ESP); Paola Tirados (ESP); 96.667 |
| Team routine | Russia (RUS); 98.750 | Japan (JPN); 98.334 | United States (USA); 96.834 |
| Combination routine | Japan (JPN); 98.500 | United States (USA); Spain (ESP); 97.333 | |
