= Yelena Antonova (synchronised swimmer) =

Russian synchronized swimmer

Personal information
- Born: 10 October 1974 (age 51) Moscow, Soviet Union

Sport
- Sport: Synchronised swimming
Medal record
Representing Russia
Olympic Games
| Gold medal – first place | 2000 Sydney | Team competition |
European Championships
| Gold medal – first place | 1995 Vienna | Team competition |
| Gold medal – first place | 1997 Istanbul | Team competition |
| Gold medal – first place | 2000 Helsinki | Team competition |

Yelena Anatolyevna Antonova (Russian: Елена Анатольевна Антонова, born 10 October 1974) is a Russian Synchro-swimmer.

She has Olympic gold medal in team competition in 2000 and won three European Championships (1995, 1999, 2000).

She was a member of the national team from 1994 to 2000.
