= Tuesday Middaugh =

American synchronized swimmer (born 1973)

Personal information
- Full name: Tuesday Jane Middaugh
- Nationality: United States
- Born: August 27, 1973 (age 52) Riverside, California, USA
- Height: 1.75 m (5 ft 9 in)
- Weight: 62 kg (137 lb)

Sport
- Sport: Swimming
- Strokes: Synchronized swimming
- Club: Santa Clara Aquamaids
- Updated on 16 November 2014

Tuesday Middaugh (born August 27, 1973) is a former synchronized swimmer from the United States. She competed in both the women's duet and women's team competitions at the 2000 Summer Olympics.
