= Anouk Renière-Lafrenière =

Canadian synchronized swimmer

Personal information
- Born: February 15, 1983 (age 43) Montreal, Quebec, Canada

Sport
- Sport: Swimming
- Strokes: Synchronized swimming

Anouk Renière-Lafrenière (born February 15, 1983) is a Canadian synchronized swimmer. She won a bronze medal at a 2002 world cup tournament in Zürich, Switzerland in the duet event. She was a member of the 2004 Olympic team in Athens, finishing fifth.
