= Kirstin Normand =

Canadian synchronized swimmer

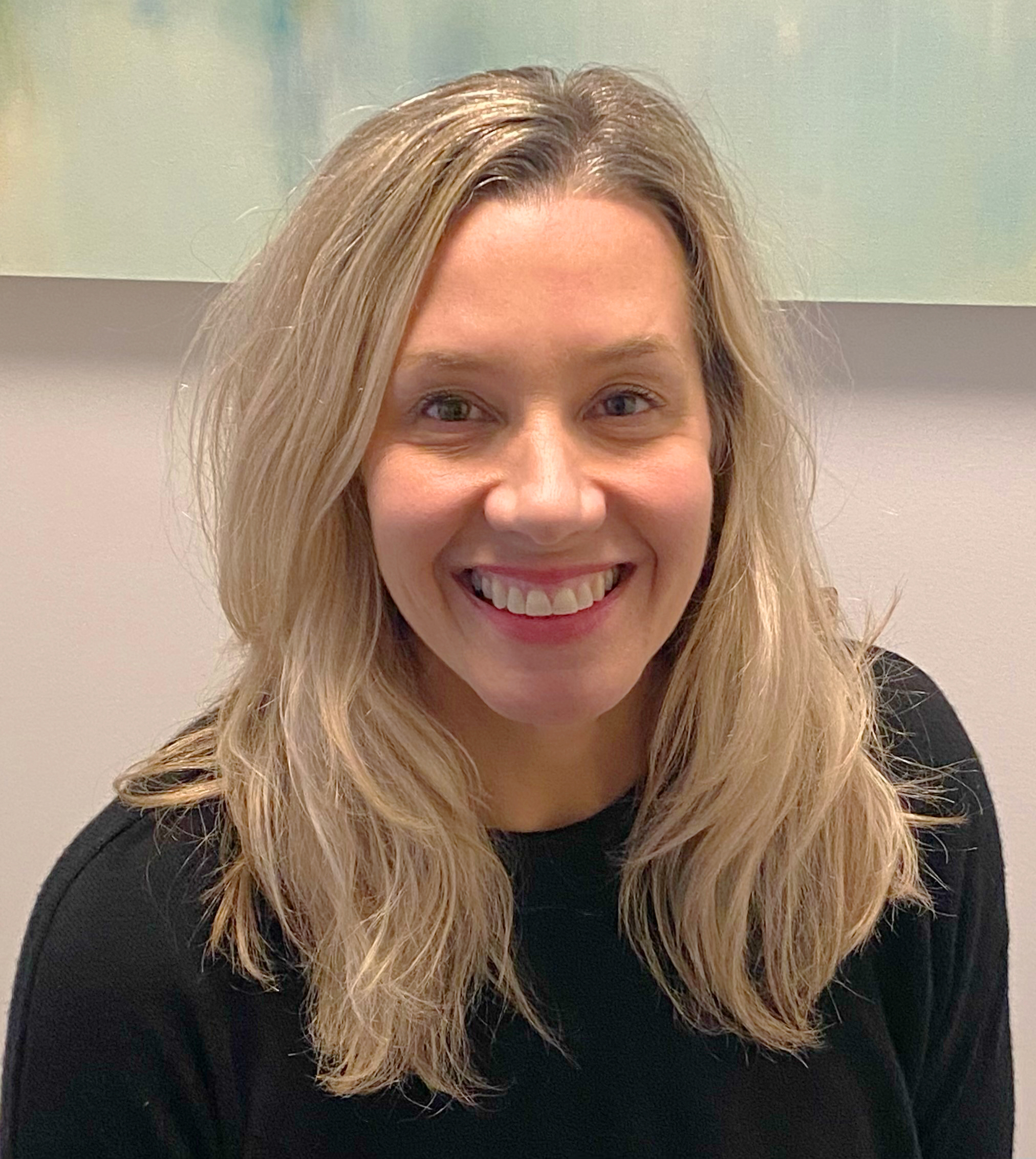
- Normand in 2021

Personal information
- Born: June 10, 1974 (age 52) North York, Ontario, Canada

Sport
- Sport: Synchronised swimming
Medal record
Representing Canada
Olympic Games
Bronze medal – third place	2000 Sydney	Team
Pan American Games
Gold medal – first place	1999 Winnipeg	Team

Kirstin Normand (born June 10, 1974) is a Canadian athlete. Normand was a competitor in synchronized swimming and Olympic medalist.

Born in North York, Ontario, Normand was the captain of the Canadian team that received a bronze medal in synchronized team at the 2000 Summer Olympics in Sydney, Australia.
