= Kanako Kitao =

Japanese-American synchronized swimmer

Personal information
- Born: February 6, 1982 (age 44) Kyoto, Japan

Sport
- Sport: Synchronised swimming
Medal record
Representing Japan
Olympic Games
Silver medal – second place	2004 Athens	Team
World Championships
Gold medal – first place	2003 Barcelona	Team, free routine
Silver medal – second place	2005 Montreal	Team
Silver medal – second place	2005 Montreal	Team, free routine
Representing United States
World Championships
Bronze medal – third place	2017 Budapest	Mixed duet free
Bronze medal – third place	2017 Budapest	Mixed duet technical routine

Kanako Spendlove (スペンドラブ 佳奈子, Spendlove Kanako; née Kitao (北尾), born 6 February 1982) is a Japanese-American synchronized swimmer who competed in the 2004 Summer Olympics for Japan, and won a silver medal.

After the 2004 Summer Olympics, Spendlove performed for Cirque du Soleil and she renounced her Japanese citizenship in December 2015. During this time, she found her own fashion brand, Perolagua.

Spendlove is continuing synchro-swimming in mixed duet, partnering with Bill May since 2016. The pair met on their respective first national team outings in 1996. Together, they won the bronze medals in the mixed duet free routine and the mixed duet technical routine at the 2017 Synchronized Swimming World Championships.
