= Reidun Tatham =

Canadian synchronized swimmer

Personal information
- Born: March 20, 1978 (age 48) Calgary, Alberta, Canada

Sport
- Sport: Swimming
Medal record
Representing Canada
Olympic Games
| Bronze medal – third place | 2000 Sydney | Team |
Pan American Games
| Gold medal – first place | 1999 Winnipeg | Team |

Reidun Tatham (born March 20, 1978) is a Canadian retired synchronized swimmer and Olympic medalist.

Born in Calgary, Alberta, Tatham participated on the Canadian team that received a bronze medal in synchronized team at the 2000 Summer Olympics in Sydney, Australia.

She later changed careers and is currently employed as Senior Natural Gas Trader at Macquarie Energy Canada Ltd. in Calgary, Alberta.
