= Chris Carver =

American synchronized swimming coach

Biographical details
- Born: Northern California
- Education: San Jose State University

Coaching career (HC unless noted)
- 1968-1980: Cloverdale Cabana Club Dolphinettes
- 1980-1984: Santa Clara Aquamaids; Ages 10 and Under
- 1984-2022: Santa Clara Aquamaids; Head coach
- 1987-2004: U.S. Olympic Team; Coach, Co-Coach with G. Emery

Accomplishments and honors

Championships
- 17 National Championships (SC Aquamaids); Synchro Team Gold Medals (1996 Olympics); Duet Bronze Medals (2004 Olympics)

Awards
- International Swimming Hall of Fame (2023); San Jose Sports Hall of Fame (2015); Hall of Fame (Women's Sports Foundation); U.S. Synchronized Swimming Coach of the Year

Chris Carver is a Hall of Fame synchronized swimming coach for age-group and U.S. national programs. She may be best known for coaching the Santa Clara Aquamaids to 17 titles in National Championship competition during her tenure as head team coach from 1984-2022. In addition to developing elite age group competitors through the Aquamaids, Carver served as a U.S. National team coach from 1987-2004.

In the years leading up to the 1996 Atlanta Olympics with Co-Coach Gail Emery, Carver helped lead the U.S. team to capture first place medals in all the international competitions it entered from the Pan American Games in 1991 to the Atlanta Summer Olympic Games in 1996. The Santa Clara Aquamaids under Carver have been credited with producing as many as 40% of the U.S. Olympic team's synchronized swimmers from 1996 through her later career. Of the nine American synchro team competitors at the 1996 Atlanta Olympics, four were Santa Clara Aquamaids, including Jill Sudduth and Becky Dyroen-Lancer. The 1996 synchro team, with four of Carver's Aquamaids, won the team Olympic gold medal, becoming the first team to receive a perfect score of 100 in Olympic team competition.

== Early life ==
Growing up in the California area, Carver attended Elwood Cubberly High School in greater Palo Alto. She took up synchronized swimming initially around seventh grade, at the urgings of her High School Gymnastics teacher, and also participated in synchronized swimming with the Athens Swim Club.

== Coaching career ==
Carver began coaching Campbell, California's Cloverdale Cabana Club Dolphinettes team around 1968, near San Jose. Under Carver's guidance, the team gained sponsorship from the Campbell Community, and on occasion performed for the International Academy of Art. By 1980, Carver was asked by Head Santa Clara Aquamaids Coach Kay Villen to coach age groups 10 and under with the larger and more accomplished nearby Santa Clara team.

== Santa Clara Aquamaids ==
Carver started as Head Coach with the Santa Clara team in 1984 after having served four years as a youth coach for their younger synchro team. From 1985-2024, Carver led the Aquamaids to 17 National Championships. In 1984, with 100 members, the Aquamaids were one of the better known and largest synchronized swimming clubs in the country.

== U.S. National Team Coach ==
Carver began coaching the U.S. National team around 1987, where she served with the Walnut Creek Aquanuts's Hall of Fame Coach Gail Emery and National Team Director Charlotte Davis. In international competition under Carver between 1987-1996, the U.S. national team won the great majority of competitions. At the 1996 Atlanta Olympics, four of Chris's swimmers from the Aquamaids were on the 1996 team. Chris served as Head Coach, and as noted also produced the choreography for the American team's first Olympic gold team event medal. With a well-received routine by the judges, Chris's synchro team earned the first 100 point score ever to be tabulated in the team event for synchronized swimming in Olympic competition. Carver also coached the U.S. Olympic team for the 2000 Sydney, and 2004 Athens Olympics. Seven of the nine members of the 2000 Sydney USA Olympic Team, had previously swum with Carver. Eight of the team in the 2004 Athens Olympics, which included synchro swimmers duet bronze medal winners Alison Bartosik and Anna Kozlova, had trained with Carver and the Aquamaids. Though Carver's official time as a U.S. National team coach spans from 1987-2004, a seventeen year period according to official sources, Carver's linked in page lists her total years as part of the National Coaching team pool from 1984-2011, though not all of these years may be considered official time as a national team coach, with consulting responsibilities varying from year to year.

=== Training methodology as coach ===
An important feature of Carver's technique included training synchro swimmers in gymnastics for flexibility, as well as plyometrics, which builds muscle while maintaining flexibility. Plyometrics can include exercises such as pushups, running, jumping and kicking. In swim training, Carver's elite swimmers averaged 6,000 yards a day, close to 3.4 miles, or 5500 meters to obtain the endurance and strength required of competition.

=== Carver's outanding swimmers ===
Carver coached Becky Dyroen-Lancer with the Aquamaids to four golds medals, a sweep, at the Synchronized Swimming World Championships in 1994. Well-recognized on the world stage, Dyroen-Lancer achieved a four gold medal sweep in international competition eight times in her career. She captured the FINA Prize Eminence, and was the only synchronized swimmer to do so. Becky and her synchro duet partner Jill Sudduth, also coached by Carver with the Aquamaids, were undefeated in international competition for a five year period.

Carver has also coached Bill May, beginning in 1996 with the Aquamaids, who later became one of the club's first male competitors. Later, in 1999 May would capture a winner's medal in the duet competitions at the Swiss and French Open championships. In 1998-9, May would be named a Synchro Athlete of the Year, and would later return to again train under Carver. Becoming the first man to win a synchro gold medal at a FINA event, May won a gold medal in the mixed duet event at the 2015 FINA World Championships.

=== Work as choreographer ===
In addition to the careful coaching of the movements of her synchro athletes, Carver has been known for her skills as a choreographer. She was the chief choreographer for “Sirella,” a French program. She correographed “Classical Splash” shows for the U.S. synchro team that featured background music from a live Orchestra, used in important exhibitions, but not at the Olympics. She has done choreography for Sea World and has worked for commercials including one for the insurance company AFLAC, which was quite well known in 2003. At the 1996 Atlanta Olympics, Coaches Carver and Emery used a medley of tunes edited for the event which has come to be known as Warriors or Tribal Percussion. The 1996 background team theme music borrowed from the Jungle, a tribal, dark percussion sound, and the Hunt from David Byrne's ritual, a more driving, and intense beat for faster high energy portions of the program.

Serving the swimming community, Carver has coached swimming clinics throughout the world during her career. She has also done product endorsements.

=== Honors ===
Carver became a member of the San Jose Sports Hall of Fame in 2015, and has been named an Olympic Coach of the year four times successively by the U.S. Aquatics Sports organization. As of 2000, she became an International Hall of Fame inductee of the Women's Sports Foundation. Carver was inducted International Swimming Hall of Fame in Fort Lauderdale as an Honor Coach in 2023. She had been named a U.S. Synchronizeded Swimming coach of the Year an unprecedented 14 times by 2011.
