= Irina Pershina =

Russian synchronized swimmer

Personal information
- Born: 13 September 1978 (age 47) Kropotkin, Krasnodar Krai, USSR

Sport
- Sport: Swimming
Medal record
Representing Russia
Olympic Games
Gold medal – first place	2000 Sydney	Team
European Championships
Gold medal – first place	1999 Istanbul	Team
Gold medal – first place	2000 Helsinki	Team

Irina Vladimirovna Pershina (Russian: Ирина Владимировна Першина; 13 September 1978) is a Russian synchronised swimmer. She won an Olympic gold medal in team competition in 2000 and won two European Championships (1999, 2000).

She was a member of National team since 1997, she is now a TV presenter for Channel One.
