= Yelena Soya =

Russian synchronized swimmer

Personal information
- Born: 9 November 1981 (age 44) Moscow, USSR

Sport
- Sport: Synchronised swimming
Medal record
Representing Russia
Olympic Games
Gold medal – first place	2000 Sydney	Team
European Championships
Gold medal – first place	1999 Istanbul	Team
Gold medal – first place	2000 Helsinki	Team

Yelena Igorevna Soya (Russian: Елена Игоревна Соя born 9 November 1981) is a Russian Synchro-swimmer. She won an Olympic gold medal in team competition in 2000 and won two European Championships (1999, 2000).

She was a member of national team in 1999-2000.

Her father Igor Soya is a coach for modern pentathlete Dmitri Svatkovskiy. On 1 January 2010, she is working with the Russian Paralympic Committee.
