= Hou Yingli =

Chinese synchronized swimmer

Personal information
- Nationality: China
- Born: August 15, 1978 (age 47) Nantong, Jiangsu, China
- Height: 1.70 m (5 ft 7 in)
- Weight: 53 kg (117 lb)

Sport
- Sport: Swimming
- Strokes: Synchronized swimming
- Club: Jiangsu Swimming Club
- Updated on 31 May 2015

Hou Yingli (Chinese: 候颖莉, born 15 August 1978) is a Chinese synchronized swimmer who competed in both the 2000 and 2004 Summer Olympics. Yingli emigrated to Canada in 2006 and now works as the head coach for the Waterloo Regional Synchronized Swimming Club.
