= Yoko Isoda =

Japanese synchronized swimmer

Personal information
- Born: August 26, 1978 (age 47) Osakasayama, Japan

Sport
- Sport: Synchronised swimming
Medal record
Representing Japan
Olympic Games
Silver medal – second place	2000 Sydney	Team
World Championships
Silver medal – second place	1998 Perth	Team

Yoko Isoda (磯田 陽子, Isoda Yōko; born 26 August 1978) is a Japanese synchronized swimmer who competed in the 2000 Summer Olympics.
