= Jacinthe Taillon =

Canadian synchronized swimmer

Personal information
- Born: January 1, 1977 (age 49) Saint-Eustache, Quebec, Canada

Sport
- Sport: Swimming
- Strokes: Synchronized swimming
Medal record
Representing Canada
Women's synchronized swimming
Olympic Games
Bronze medal – third place	2000 Sydney	Team
Pan American Games
Gold medal – first place	1999 Winnipeg	Team
Commonwealth Games
Gold medal – first place	1998 Kuala Lumpur	Duet

Jacinthe Taillon (born January 1, 1977) is a Canadian competitor in synchronized swimming and Olympic medalist.

Born in Saint-Eustache, Quebec, Taillon participated on the Canadian team that received a bronze medal in synchronized team at the 2000 Summer Olympics in Sydney, Australia.

She also won a gold medal at the 1999 Pan American Games in the team event and a gold medal at the 1998 Commonwealth Games in the Duet event.
