= Athens Olympic Aquatic Centre =

Swimming center in Athens, Greece

Coordinates: 38.0387°N 23.7808°E

- Athens Olympic Aquatic Center in 2011
- Interactive map of Athens Olympic Aquatic Centre
- Full name: Athens Olympic Aquatic Centre
- Address: Marousi, Athens, Greece
- Capacity: 11,500 (larger pool); 5,300 (smaller pool); 6,200 (indoor pool)

The Athens Olympic Aquatic Centre is a complex at the Athens Olympic Sports Complex in Marousi, Athens, Greece, consisting of two outdoor pools and one indoor pool, that was built for the 1991 Mediterranean Games. It was refurbished and expanded for the 2004 Summer Olympics and the 2004 Summer Paralympics. The larger of the two outdoor pools, which seats 11,500 spectators, hosted swimming and water polo events. The smaller pool, which hosted synchronized swimming, had the capacity for 5.300 people. The indoor pool also hosted the water polo, diving and the swimming during the Paralympics had capacity for another 6.300 persons.

The outdoor pool was the subject of significant controversy during the run-up to the Olympic Games. At the bidding process, the Bidding Committee and the Greek Government promised that the outdoor pools would gain cover to meet the necessary conditions requested by FINA at the time. But, due to the inflation of the Game's works and the constant delays, it was decided that the planned coverage would have to wait for later, which until 2024 has not happened. According to preliminary assessments, the roof would serve to protect both athletes and spectators from the scorching sun and summer heat of Athens, which were even worse in the pools because of their location in the west. However, this ended up not happening because of inflated costs and constant delays in other works that were more urgent and there is no option, FINA approved the holding of events in outdoor pools that received temporary bleachers to reach the minimum required capacity these bleachers were higher than the fixed ones and provided shade for the outdoor pools and other areas of the complex, but not for the present public.

Since 2005, outdoor pools have been used to host swimming programs during the period between the late spring to the early winter. During the high winter period, the programs were held in the indoor pools.

In 2024, the two outdoor pools remain wide open to the sky.

The outdoor pool during the 2004 Summer Olympics.

After the games, the city did not have any legacy plans for the venue. The last master plan dated back to 1985 for the 1991 Mediterranean Games and the next one was adopted in 2014, so they did not get the most out of the opportunity. It is known that the dynamics of cities have been strongly influenced by late 20th-century economic globalization. Hosting the 2004 Summer Olympics at this existent aquatic center has helped Athens's economic growth and helped enhance the globalization of the urban areas. The aquatic center got many upgrades as well, many visual. Athens Olympic Aquatic Centre for the 2004 Olympics had a contract with the company PICO to supply the overlays to every Olympic center that was hosting the Olympic games.

The Aquatic Centre needed many service overlays, tents, and stations to host all of the behind-the-scenes portions of the 2004 Summer Olympics. This insured that the running of the event had the infrastructure. This included locations to film, the security personnel, and the barricades around the perimiter, and including modifications to the aquatic center to increase the visual appearance. They supplied nearly 1000 flag and banner poles, hanging up a variety of countries' flags and more.
