= Alison Bartosik =

American synchronized swimmer

Personal information
- Born: April 20, 1983 (age 43) Flagstaff, Arizona, U.S.
- Occupations: Coach, Business Sales Exec
- Spouse: Matthew Beaver (m. 2018)

Sport
- Events: Synchonized Swimming; Duet, Team
- College team: Stanford University
- Club: Santa Clara Aquamaids
- Coached by: Chris Carver (Aquamaids, Olympics)
Medal record
Women's synchronized swimming
Representing United States
Olympic Games
| Bronze medal – third place | 2004 Athens | Duet |
| Bronze medal – third place | 2004 Athens | Team |
World Championships
| Silver medal – second place | 2003 Barcelona | Team, free routine |
| Bronze medal – third place | 2003 Barcelona | Team |
Pan American Games
| Gold medal – first place | 2003 Santo Domingo | Duet |
| Gold medal – first place | 2003 Santo Domingo | Team |

Alison Bartosik (born April 20, 1983), also known at times by her 2018 married name Allison Beaver, is an American competitor in synchronized swimming who competed for Stanford University and won two bronze medals at the 2004 Summer Olympics. In addition to competing during her college years, she worked as a coach, and after graduating from college with a business degree, worked as a corporate sales executive.

Bartosik was born April 20, 1983 in Flagstaff, Arizona, but grew up in California. Beginning to train in synchronized swimming at age 8, by 15 she became one of the youngest members of the U.S. Junior National team. She attended Santa Clara High School, and trained and competed with the Santa Clara Aquamaids. The Aquamaids trained at the Santa Clara Aquatics complex in the same facility as the highly competitive Santa Clara Swim Club. Through the age of 19 with the Aquamaids, Bartosik was managed by Chris Carver who served as head coach from 1984 to 2022.

At the 2003 World Championships, Bartosik captured a second place finish in the combo competition and in the team event placed third. At the U.S. Open Swimming Championships, she captured the 14–15 age-group solo championship. At the Santo Domingo Pan American games in 2003, Bartosik won a gold medal in both the duet and team competition.

== 2004 Olympics ==
In a career highpoint, Alison won two bronze medals at the 2004 Summer Olympics in Athens, Greece, with one in duet with the more experienced Russian-born Anna Kozlova, and one in the team competition. In the duet competition, Bartosik and Kozlova, earned technical marks of 9.8 and 9.7 primarily, and artistic scores that did not exceed 9.8. Their duet earned a total 96.918 points and was a salute to Greek myths, focusing on the character Medusa. Following that theme, the duet team had suits with images of snakes, and were colored gold and white with sequins in green. At the 2004 Olympics, Bartosik was coached U.S. Olympic synchronized swimming head coach and her former coach at the Aquamaids Chris Carver.

Not long after the Olympics in 2005, Bartosik worked as a coach with Nevada Desert Mermaids that at Age Group nationals placed second for 12–13 year-olds, also coaching the Las Vegas Synchronettes that year.

=== Stanford University ===
Bartosik attended Stanford University and competed in synchronized swimming for three years. In her third season with the team, she served as an assistant coach on a voluntary basis. She began at Stanford in the fall of 2007, spending much of the summer of 2007 coaching combo, solo and teams as a USA National Team II assistant coach. As a competitor, Bartosik helped lead the Stanford team to the U.S. National Title and the National Collegiate Title, in the 2008 season.

Although she did not medal, her Senior Duet team performed in the 2008 Beijing Olympics.

Due to the demands of her career as an athlete and coach, Bartosik did not complete her studies at Stanford, but transferred to Santa Clara University, completing a Bachelor of Science with a major in Finance in 2009.

Bartosik married Matthew Beaver on June 8, 2018 in Lake Tahoe, California.

=== Post collegiate career ===
In later careers, Bartosik served as an executive in sales for Motally, a San Francisco-based company which provided analytics for applications and mobile websites. She also was associated with Athletes For Hope and was a volunteer in the Aquatics program for KEEN San Francisco.
