= Michiyo Fujimaru =

Japanese synchronized swimmer

Personal information
- Born: April 6, 1979 (age 47) Tokyo, Japan

Sport
- Sport: Synchronised swimming
Medal record
Representing Japan
Olympic Games
Silver medal – second place	2004 Athens	Team
World Championships
Gold medal – first place	2003 Barcelona	Team, free routine
Silver medal – second place	2001 Fukuoka	Team
Silver medal – second place	2003 Barcelona	Team

Michiyo Fujimaru (born 6 April 1979) is a Japanese synchronized swimmer who competed in the 2004 Summer Olympics.
