= Lyne Beaumont =

Canadian synchronized swimmer

Personal information
- Born: January 23, 1978 (age 48) Quebec City, Canada

Sport
- Sport: Synchronised swimming
Medal record
Representing Canada
Olympic Games
Bronze medal – third place	2000 Sydney	Team

Lyne Beaumont (born January 23, 1978) is a Canadian competitor in synchronized swimming and Olympic medalist. She participated in the Canadian team that received a bronze medal in synchronized team at the 2000 Summer Olympics in Sydney, Australia.
