= Elena Azarova =

Russian synchronized swimmer

Personal information
- Born: 5 June 1973 (age 53) Moscow, Soviet Union

Sport
- Sport: Synchronised swimming
Medal record
Representing Russia
Olympic Games
Gold medal – first place	2000 Sydney	Team competition
Gold medal – first place	2004 Athens	Team competition
World Championships
Gold medal – first place	1998 Perth	Team competition
European Championships
Gold medal – first place	1991 Athens	Team competition
Gold medal – first place	1993 Sheffield	Team competition
Gold medal – first place	1995 Vienna	Duet competition
Gold medal – first place	1995 Vienna	Team competition
Gold medal – first place	1997 Seville	Team competition
Gold medal – first place	1999 Istanbul	Team competition
Gold medal – first place	2000 Helsinki	Team competition

Elena Yuryevna Azarova (Russian: Еле′на Ю′рьевна Аза′рова; born 5 June 1973) is a Russian synchronized swimmer.

She has two won Olympic gold medals (2000, 2004), and a winner of World (1998) and European Championships (1991, 1993, 1995, 1997, 1999, 2000), World Cups and other tournaments.

She is a member of National team since 1989 and retirement in 2004, and now she is media relations manager of Special Olympics.
