= Olga Vasyukova =

Russian synchronized swimmer

Personal information
- Born: 8 May 1980 (age 46) Budapest, Hungary

Sport
- Sport: Synchronised swimming
Medal record
Representing Russia
Olympic Games
Gold medal – first place	2000 Sydney	Team
European Championships
Gold medal – first place	1999 Istanbul	Team
Gold medal – first place	2000 Helsinki	Team

Olga Petrovna Vasyukova (Russian: Ольга Петровна Васюкова born May 8, 1980) is a former Russian synchronised swimmer. She won an Olympic gold medal in team competition in 2000 and won two European Championships (1999, 2000).

She was a member of National team in 1998–2000, she is working in Channel One.
