= Catherine Garceau =

Canadian synchronized swimmer

Personal information
- Born: July 1, 1978 (age 47) Montreal, Quebec, Canada

Sport
- Sport: Synchronised swimming
Medal record
Representing Canada
Olympic Games
Bronze medal – third place	2000 Sydney	Team
World Championships
Bronze medal – third place	2001 Fukuoka	Team

Catherine Garceau (born July 1, 1978) is a Canadian competitor in synchronized swimming and Olympic medalist. She participated in the Canadian team that received a bronze medal in synchronized team at the 2000 Summer Olympics in Sydney, Australia.

In 2012, Garceau authored "Swimming Out of Water," which was published by Morgan James Publishing.
