= Kendra Zanotto =

American synchronized swimmer

Personal information
- Born: October 30, 1981 (age 44) Los Gatos, California, U.S.
- Education: Columbia University B.A. San Jose State University M.A.
- Occupations: Synchro Coach; Elementary School teacher
- Height: 162 cm (5 ft 4 in)
- Weight: 52 kg (115 lb)

Sport
- Club: Santa Clara Aquamaids
- Coached by: Chris Carver (Aquamaids, Nat. Team)
Medal record
Women's synchronized swimming
Representing the United States
Olympic Games
Bronze medal – third place	2004 Athens	Team

Kendra Zanotto (born October 30, 1981) was an American competitor in synchronized swimming, who competed and trained with the Santa Clara Aquamaids and won a Team gold medal in the 2004 Athens Olympics. She coached synchronized swimming for the Aquamaids after her elite years as a competitor. After receiving a Masters in Education from San Jose State University, she taught elementary school, including a seven year stint teaching Math and Science at Loma Prieta Elementary.

Kendra was born in Los Gatos, California, on October 30, 1981, as the oldest child of Daniel and Kimber Zanotto, of Zanotto Markets, a business started by her grandparents. Kendra graduated St. Francis High School a coeducational Catholic High School founded by the Brothers of the Holy Cross in Mountain View, California. She began training around 1988 with various clubs in synchronized swimming, and soon swam with the Santa Clara Aquamaids under Hall of Fame Coach Chris Carver who also coached the U.S. National team .

== International competition ==
In international competition, she won a silver medal in the synchronized Free Routine competition at the World Aquatics Championships in 2003 in Barcelona and a bronze in the team competition, and won a gold medal in the group competition at the 2003 Summer Pan American Games in Santo Domingo.

=== Coaching ===
After leaving elite competition, she coached synchronized swimming with the Santa Clara Aquamaids for around six years and coached the Synchro Belles swimming team in 2004 at the Belle Terre Swimming Pool.

She is married, has two children, and as of 2026 resided in Los Gatos, where she grew up.

== 2004 Athens Olympics ==
She won an Olympic bronze medal at the 2004 Summer Olympics, in the team competition, with the U.S. team scoring a total of 97.418 points. With the Russian team taking gold with 99.501 points, and the Japanese taking the silver 98.501 points, Zanotto competed with the American team of Allison Bartosik, Tammy Crow, Erin Dobratz, Becky Jasontek, Anna Kozlova, Sara Lowe, Lauren McFall, and Stephanie Nesbit. The U.S. edged out the team from Spain who scored a total of 96.751 points.

=== Education and careers ===
In educational pursuits, Kendra attended Columbia University where she received a BA in Political Science. She later completed a Masters from San Jose State University in Education. She has taught elementary school Math and Science at Loma Prieta Elementary for seven years.
