= Claire Carver-Dias =

Canadian synchronized swimmer

Claire Carver-Dias OLY
Personal information
- Born: May 19, 1977 (age 49) Burlington, Ontario, Canada
- Education: University of Toronto (BA)

Sport
- Sport: Swimming
Medal record
Representing Canada
Women's synchronized swimming
Olympic Games
Bronze medal – third place	2000 Sydney	Team
Pan American Games
Gold medal – first place	1999 Winnipeg	Duet
Gold medal – first place	1999 Winnipeg	Team
Commonwealth Games
Gold medal – first place	2002 Manchester	Solo
Gold medal – first place	2002 Manchester	Duet

Claire Rhiannon Carver-Dias (born May 19, 1977) is a Canadian competitor in synchronized swimming and Olympic medallist.

== Career ==
She grew up in Montreal, Quebec, but moved to Toronto in her late teens to pursue a career on the Canadian National Synchronized Swim Team.

From 1994 to 1996 Carver-Dias competed in the duet event and won several national titles with duet partner Estella Warren, who went on to become an international model and movie-star.

Carver-Dias won the gold medal at the 1999 Pan American Games in the Women's Duet alongside Fanny Létourneau, and a gold medal in the team event as well.

She participated on the Canadian team that received a bronze medal in synchronized team at the 2000 Summer Olympics in Sydney, Australia, and placed fifth in the duet event.

During this time she attended the Mississauga campus of the University of Toronto and graduated with a Bachelor of Arts in English in 2002. At the 2002 Commonwealth Games, Carver-Dias earned two gold medals, one in the solo event and one in the duet event.

She was the President of AthletesCAN from 2006 to 2008 and was elected to the board of Commonwealth Games Canada in 2014. She completed a master's degree at McGill University and currently works as a management consultant (www.clearday.ca). She also holds a PhD from the University of Wales, an MBA from Cornell and Queen's Universities, and has written a novel called "The Games," which earned her a Mississauga Literary Arts Award in 2013.

She is in the Mississauga Sports Hall of Fame, the Canada Games Hall of Honour, and the Synchro Quebec Hall of Fame; and hosted podcasts called "The Water Cooler Effect", and "Bright Lights, Big Sauga," which are available on iTunes.

In 2018, she led Team Canada as the chef de mission of Canada's 2018 Commonwealth Games team, where the team tied their best ever medal haul. She served as Co-Chef de Mission for Team Canada at the 2022 Commonwealth Games, alongside Sam Effah, a track star who was also runner up in the Amazing Race Canada.

Carver-Dias is the current President of Commonwealth Sport Canada. She also serves as Chair of OLY Canada, Canada's Olympian association.
