= Rebecca Jasontek =

American synchronized swimmer

Personal information
- Born: February 26, 1975 (age 51) Cincinnati, Ohio, U.S.
- Height: 162 cm (64 in)
- Weight: 58 kg (128 lb)
- Spouse: Joe Tomsic

Sport
- College team: Ohio State University 1997
- Club: Walnut Creek Aquanuts
- Coached by: Gail Emery (Aquanuts); Mary Jo Ruggieri (OSU); Chris Carver (2004 Olympics)
Medal record
Women's synchronized swimming
Representing United States
Olympic Games
Bronze medal – third place	2004 Athens	Team
World Aquatics Championships
Silver medal – second place	2003 Barcelona	Combination
Bronze medal – third place	2003 Barcelona	Team
Bronze medal – third place	1998 Perth	Team

Rebecca Jasontek (born February 26, 1975) is an American competitor in synchronized swimming who was an All American at Ohio State University, and a bronze medalist in the team event at the 2004 Olympics. An accomplished international competitor, she was an alternate at the 2000 Olympics and received medals in both the 1998 and 2003 World Aquatic Championships.

Born February 26, 1975, in greater Cincinnati, Ohio, Rebecca was the youngest daughter of Michael and Virginia Jasontek. She grew up in Loveland, Ohio and attended Mount Notre Dame High School graduating in 1993. She has an older sister, Julie who competed in swimming for Mount Notre Dame, attended Ohio State, and would later help coach her mother's Cincinnati Synchrogator team, focusing at one point on the 18-19 year olds. Born into a family focused on synchronized swimming, Rebecca took to the pool by the age of 6 and was soon training in synchro, rarely experiencing long periods away from the pool. Her mother Ginny served as the head coach of the Cincinnati Synchrogator Team, and was a former synchronized swimming champion from New Jersey who started the team in September 1969 at the Gamble-Nippert YMCA.

== Ohio State ==
Jasontek attended The Ohio State University from 1993–1997 where she was a four time All American in synchronized swimming and was coached by Dr. Mary Jo Ruggieri through 1995, and then Linda Lichter-Witter. A focused student despite the demands of her athletic training, she was an All Big-10 honoree in academics. Widely recognized for her synchronized skills during college, she was the 1996 Collegiate Synchronized Swimmer of the Year. Jasontek was a four-time Collegiate National team champion, a Collegiate National duet champion three times, and a Collegiate National trio champion three times. An able student, she received a Bachelor of Arts in Communication in 1997 from Ohio State, graduating cum laude.

In 1997, Rebecca moved to Walnut Creek, California, and practiced with the Walnut Creek Aquanuts where she was trained by Hall of Fame Coach Gail Emery after her eligibility with Ohio State ended. An exceptionally strong program, the Aquanuts had finished as high as second in the National Championships with Jasonteck as a team member, and Jasontek had placed fifth as her best individual finish in 1999. Emery, who began as a coach with Walnut Creek in 1970's, had been a Co-coach for the U.S. National team in 1996 that won the first Olympic team competition. In her career, Emery had led a few of her Aquanuts to Olympic Gold medals in Barcelona in 1992.

== Olympics ==
Going into the 1996 Olympic trials in Indianapolis for synchronized swimming in mid-October, 1995, Jasontek was rated 16th, and placed 14th in the final standings.

=== 2000 Sydney ===
In June 1999, Jasontek was selected as a potential Olympian and placed fifth among the 13 team candidates selected for the team. In an unexpected turn of events, Jasontek had emergency surgery for a ruptured ovarian cyst in September, 1999 that could have been life threatening. She would likely have been picked as a full team member if not for the incident which required time away from training. She spent a full two weeks in bed, and six weeks before attempting light pool training. Her surgery occurred a year before the late September 2000 Sydney Olympics. By late April, 2000, Jasontek had recovered and trained sufficiently to attend the Janzen National Synchronized Swimming Championship in Maryland. She had originally been picked as a second alternate for the U.S. Sydney team in January, 2000, but at the 2000 Olympics, after moving up to a first alternate, she watched by the sidelines as the American team finished a disappointing fifth. Despite her recovery, the surgery affected her pre-Olympic training, and made her question if she could ever return to serious training for the next Olympics.

Deciding to undertake the challenge, Jasontek continued with the Santa Clara based U.S. team, training for four years. For the final two years, she trained up to eight hours a day, six days a week in preparation for Athens.

=== 2004 Athens ===
Considering the team's 2000 performance, Jasontek was thrilled to win a bronze medal at the 2004 Summer Olympics, in the synchronized team competition. The American team placed behind the winning gold medal Russian Federation, and silver medalists Japan. The dominant Russian team had won every event they had previously entered since the 2000 Olympics in 2000 and were expected to dominate the 2004 synchronized swimming event, and won handily. The American team performed in one routine to the music of Lord of the Rings, and executed a well-performed double toss of two of the team members, considered a nearly flawless routine by the U.S. coach Chris Carver. Their final routine was to the music of the Sorcerer's Apprentice.

After the 2004 Olympics, Jasontek began working in marketing in Santa Clara, California.

== Personal life ==
Rebecca married Joey Tomsic prior to the 2004 Olympics at St. Francis DeSales Church in greater Cincinnati on August 30, 2003. Rebecca's sister Julie served as Maid of Honor. With the demands of her training schedule, their honeymoon was postponed until after the 2004 Olympics. In 2008, the family lived in Kansas City, where husband Joe had been transferred with his job. They later welcomed their son in April, 2010.

=== Honors ===
Jasontek was a Hall of Fame Honoree at Ohio State. She was a finalist for the 1997 Big Ten Conference Medal of Honor. A local recipient of recognition, Jasontek was the Greater Cincinnati Collegiate Sportswoman of the Year.
