= Marie-Pierre Gagné =

Canadian synchronized swimmer

Personal information
- Full name: Marie-Pierre Gagné
- Nationality: Canada
- Born: February 28, 1983 (age 43) Montreal, Quebec, Canada
- Height: 5 ft 5 in (165 cm)
- Weight: 123 lb (56 kg)

Sport
- Sport: Swimming
- Club: Montréal Synchro Club

Marie-Pierre Gagné (born February 28, 1983) is a Canadian former synchronized swimmer. She began synchronized swimming at age six. She finished in fourth place at the 2003 world championships at Barcelona, Spain in the free routine combination event. She is also currently studying medicine at Université de Montréal, in Montreal.

She was the captain of the Canadian national team and competed at Beijing in 2008 for her second Olympics.
