= Olga Novokshchenova =

Russian synchronized swimmer

Personal information
- Born: 29 November 1974 (age 51) Moscow, USSR

Sport
- Sport: Synchronised swimming
Medal record
Representing Russia
Olympic Games
Gold medal – first place	2000 Sydney	Team
Gold medal – first place	2004 Athens	Team
World Championships
Gold medal – first place	1998 Perth	Team
European Championships
Gold medal – first place	1993 Sheffield	Team
Gold medal – first place	1995 Vienna	Team
Gold medal – first place	1997 Seville	Team
Gold medal – first place	1999 Istanbul	Team
Gold medal – first place	2000 Helsinki	Team
Gold medal – first place	2004 Madrid	Team

Olga Nikolayevna Novokshchenova (Russian: О′льга Никола′евна Новокще′нова, 29 November 1974) is a Russian Synchro-swimmer.

She has two Olympic gold medals (2000, 2004), and a winner of World (1997, 1998, 2000) and European Championships (1993, 1995, 1997, 1999, 2000, 2004), World Cups and other tournaments.

She is a member of National team since 1992. Now, she is the manager of public relations for Russian Paralympic Committee. She also teaches synchronized swimming in Port Antonio, Jamaica.
