= Mariya Kiselyova =

Russian synchronized swimmer

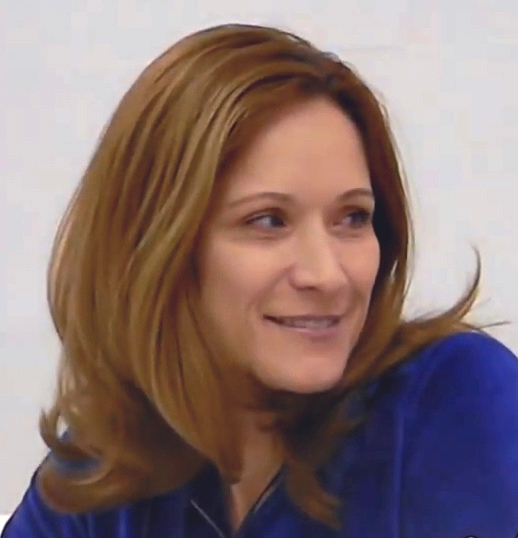
- Kiselyova in 2011

Member of the Moscow City Duma
- Incumbent
- Assumed office 2019

Personal details
- Born: September 28, 1974 (age 51) Samara, Samara Oblast, Russian SFSR, Soviet Union

Mariya Kiselyova
Medal record

Women's synchronized swimming

Representing Russia

Olympic Games
Gold medal – first place	2000 Sydney	Duet
Gold medal – first place	2000 Sydney	Team competition
Gold medal – first place	2004 Athens	Team competition

Mariya Aleksandrovna Kiselyova (Russian: Мари́я Александровна Киселёва; born September 28, 1974, in Samara) is a female synchronised swimmer from Russia. She competes in synchronised swimming and has won three Olympic golds and three golds in the world championships. In Russia, she is currently known as a TV show presenter and a politician for the ruling United Russia party. She is currently a member of the Moscow City Duma.

== Electoral history ==
2019 Moscow City Duma election (4th constituency)
Candidate	Party	Votes	%
Maria Kiseleva	United Russia	14,835	42.74%
Sergey Desyatkin	CPRF	12,598	36.29%
Darya Mitina	CPCR	3589	10.34%
Vladimir Bessonov	LDPR	2348	6.76%
Erik Lobakh	A Just Russia	1344	3.87%
