= Stephanie Nesbitt =

American synchronized swimmer

Personal information
- Full name: Stephanie Nesbitt -Dracz
- Born: 10 August 1985 (age 41) Toronto, Ontario, Canada
- Education: Sierra College
- Height: 165 cm (5 ft 5 in)
- Weight: 52 kg (115 lb)

Sport
- Sport: Synchronized Swimming
- Club: Riverside Aquettes
- Coached by: Sue Baross Nesbitt (Aquettes)
Medal record
Women's synchronized swimming
Representing the United States
Olympic Games
Bronze medal – third place	2004 Athens	Team

Stephanie Nesbitt (born 10 August 1985) is a Canadian-born American competitor in synchronized swimming who won a bronze medal in team competition at the 2004 Athens Olympics.

== Early life ==
Nesbitt was born in Toronto, Canada, on 10 August 1985. Stephanie's mother Sue Baross Nesbitt served as a synchronized swimming champion and coached the Riverside Aquettes, and in 1973 and 1975 was a world champion in team competition. Stephanie's younger sister, Barbara Nesbitt, who attended Ohio State, competed as a synchronized swimmer and was a synchronized coach and trainer.

== Career highlights ==
Stephanie began swimming with the Riverside Aquettes in Riverside, CA, as a child. In 1994, she took first place in the Junior National Duet Championship with fellow Riverside Aquettes team member Courtenay Stewart. In 2002, she placed second in the duet competition with Sara Lowe at the VIII Junior World Championships in Montreal, and was a member of the USA Team that came in 3rd place at the X FINA World Cup in Zurich, Switzerland. She was a member of the USA Team that placed 3rd overall and in Free Routine Combination at the X World Aquatic Championships in Barcelona, Spain, in 2003, before she went on to participate with the team that took first at the XIV Pan American Games in Santo Domingo, Dominican Republic.

== 2004 Olympics ==
Stephanie won an Olympic bronze medal at the 2004 Summer Olympics, in Athens, in the Women's synchronized team competition. The Russian synchronized swimming team had been highly dominant in previous Olympics, and had won nearly every synchronized event they had entered since the 2004 Olympics. The Japanese team had taken the silver in the team compeitition in 2000, and did the same in 2004. After winning her medal, she was honored with a parade on Main Street in her home town of Riverside, California.

In August 2008, Stephanie performed in Le Reve, a synchronized swimming act with around 14 performers, which included four international Olympians. La Reve performed at the Wynn Las Vegas Hotel. In 2009, Stephanie attended Sierra College.

=== Honors ===
In conjunction with the U.S. 2004 Olympic Team for Synchronized Swimming, Stephanie was a U.S.S. Athlete of the Year. She was a U.S.O.C. Sportswoman of the Year, and was nominated for the James E. Sullivan Award.
