= Courtenay Stewart =

Canadian synchronized swimmer

Personal information
- Born: January 17, 1985 (age 41) Unionville, Ontario, Canada

Sport
- Sport: Synchronised swimming
Medal record
Representing Canada
Pan American Games
Silver medal – second place	2003 Santo Domingo	Duet
Silver medal – second place	2002 Santo Domingo	Team

Courtenay Stewart (born January 17, 1985) is a Canadian synchronized swimmer, who won the silver medal in the women's duet at the 2003 Pan American Games alongside partner Fanny Létourneau.

== Early life and education ==
Courtenay Stewart was born on January 17, 1985, in Unionville, Ontario, Canada.

She attended Stanford University and swam for the Stanford Synchronized Swimming Squad. She graduated from osteopathic medical school at Touro University California.

She completed her residency in Physical Medicine and Rehabilitation at Stanford University Medical Center and is completing a CERC Fellowship (clinical excellence research center) at Stanford University Medical Center.

== Career ==
Stewart was affiliated with the Riverside AQuettes, Riverside.

She won the silver medal in the women's duet at the 2003 Pan American Games alongside partner Fanny Létourneau.

Her best finish at the 2003 World Championships in Barcelona, Spain was a fourth-place finish in the free routine combination.

She was a member of the 2004 Canadian Olympic Team that placed 5th at the Games in Athens, Greece. Courtenay, along with duet partner Létourneau, placed sixth in duet at the Olympics as well.
