= Yoko Yoneda =

Japanese synchronized swimmer

Personal information
- Born: November 22, 1975 (age 50) Osakasayama, Japan

Sport
- Sport: Synchronised swimming
Medal record
Representing Japan
Olympic Games
Silver medal – second place	2000 Sydney	Team
Silver medal – second place	2004 Athens	Team
World Championships
Gold medal – first place	2003 Barcelona	Team, free routine
Silver medal – second place	1998 Perth	Team
Silver medal – second place	2001 Fukuoka	Team
Silver medal – second place	2003 Barcelona	Team

Yoko Yoneda (born 22 November 1975) is a Japanese synchronized swimmer who competed in the 2000 Summer Olympics and in the 2004 Summer Olympics. She is the older sister of Yuko Yoneda who is also a synchronized swimmer.
