= Lauren McFall =

American synchronized swimmer

Lauren McFall Gardner
Personal information
- Born: February 9, 1980 (age 46) Sacramento, California, U.S.
- Education: Columbia University
- Occupations: Business developer, financial transactions
- Height: 175 cm (5 ft 9 in)
- Weight: 58 kg (128 lb)
- Spouse: Gabriel Gardner

Sport
- Club: Santa Clara Aquamaids
- Coached by: Chris Carver (Aquamaids)
Medal record
Women's synchronized swimming
Representing the United States
Olympic Games
Bronze medal – third place	2004 Athens	Team

Lauren Gardner (née McFall) (born February 9, 1980) represented America in synchronized swimming at the 2004 Summer Olympics in Athens, Greece.

== Education ==
McFall was born in Sacramento, California on February 9, 1980. She attended Los Altos High School, and swam for the Santa Clara Aquamaids under Hall of Fame Coach Chris Carver. With an outstanding record of achievement, Carver coached a large percentage of the U.S. women synchronized swimmers who participated in the Olympics since 1984, and has coached the U.S. National team. Carver has been noted for her exceptional achievements in choreographing her athletes and synchronizing their movements to music, a focus that was recognized by the Olympic judges in 2004.

McFall attended the Columbia University School of General Studies in Manhattan, New York. McFall attended Columbia from 2005 to 2008 and was awarded a BA with majors in political science and international relations.

== 2004 Olympics ==
McFall served as the American team captain, leading the American women to a bronze medal in the team competition. With the Russian team as heavy favorites, they took the gold with a score of 99.667 having won every synchronized swimming event they had entered since 2000. The Japanese, who placed second in team competition, repeated their prior performance, having taken silver in former Olympics in 2000. The American team were pleased to be among the medalists, having failed to receive a synchro medal in the prior Olympics.

=== Careers ===
Gardner has worked for several companies in electronic processing in the financial field, specifically for fixed income and other specialized financial contracts. Beginning in December 2015, she held the position of Head of Business Development for EBS/BrokerTec- an electronic execution venue for Foreign Exchange and US Treasuries.

She has been a supporter of Asphalt Green and The Big Swim since 2002. She served as a volunteer for Olympic Day 2016, benefitting children ages 5–12, where former Olympians explain how the ideals of the Olympics have helped shape their lives.

=== Personal life ===
She is married to Gabriel Gardner, a gold medalist in men's indoor volleyball from the 2008 Beijing Olympics. They have four children, two of whom are from Gabriel's previous marriage, and they reside in California.
