= Sara Lowe =

American synchronized swimmer (born 1984)

Personal information
- Full name: Sara Elizabeth Lowe
- Born: April 30, 1984 (age 42) DeSoto, Texas, U.S.

Sport
- Sport: Synchronized swimming
- College team: Stanford University
- Club: Santa Clara Aquamaids
- Coached by: Chris Carver (Santa Clara)
Medal record
Women's synchronized swimming
Representing the United States
Olympic Games
Bronze medal – third place	2004 Athens	Team
Pan American Games
Gold medal – first place	2003 Santo Domingo	Team

Sara Elizabeth Lowe (born April 30, 1984), also known by her married name Sarah Lilly, was an All American competitor in synchronized swimming for Stanford University, and won a bronze medal in synchronized swimming team competition at the 2004 Athens Olympics. From 2012 until 2018, she served as a highly successful synchronized swimming coach at Stanford, and in 2013 was inducted into the United States Synchronized Swimming Hall of Fame.

== High School era competition ==
Lowe was born in DeSoto, Texas on April 30, 1984. She was exposed to synchronized swimming at a fairly young age as her mother had competed in the sport in college. She took her first synchronized Swimming course at Northlake College, a Community college in the Dallas, Fort-Worth area. She continued to train in synchronized swimming, and in 1999, at the age of 15, she moved to California to train with the Santa Clara Aquamaids, a nationally recognized program where she was coached by Head Coach Chris Carver and Assistant Coach Nancy Hines. Carver also coached the U.S. National Team for several years and had coached nearly all of the members of the 2004 U.S. Synchronized Swimming Team. In 2000, Lowe competed with her first National team. From 2000 until 2005, while competing with both the U.S. National Team and the Santa Clara Aquamaids, Lowe was a U.S. synchronized swimming All-American.

Lowe won a gold in synchronized swimming at the 2003 Pan American Games in the Dominican Republic.

== 2004 Olympic bronze medal ==
She won an Olympic bronze medal at the 2004 Summer Olympics, in the synchronized swimming team competition with Russia taking the Gold, and Japan taking the silver. The 2004 U.S. Olympic team was managed by Santa Clara Aquamaid's assistant coach Nancy Hines.

=== Stanford University ===
Considered the most impactful member of Stanford's synchronized swimming team in the program's history, Lowe started her role as a student involved in Stanford Collegiate athletics in the fall of 2004, and graduated with a degree in communication in 2008. She was an All-American four-times, and a member of Stanford teams that won four consecutive U.S. Collegiate National Championships, while capturing the Collegiate High Point Athlete award each of her four years at Stanford. She served as captain during her sophomore, junior and senior years. She completed a master's in business administration from St. Mary's College in the spring of 2017.

=== Coaching ===
Beginning in 2012, she served as a synchronized swimming coach at Stanford University, and became head coach in 2013. She served a total of four years as an assistant coach at Stanford, beginning to coach not long after her 2008 graduation from the university. In 2016, she guided the program to the U.S. Collegiate National Championship in Gainesville, Florida. In 2017, she coached the Stanford team to a second-place finish at the U.S. National Collegiate Championships in Columbus, Ohio, with the Ohio State team finishing first. From around 2015 until 2018, she coached Stanford's synhcronized swimming team to three first-place finishes at the Western Regional Championships.

Lowe served as a member of the board of directors for United States Synchronized Swimming from 2009 to 2012.

Lowe produced 33 All-American synchronized swimmers at Stanford before retiring as Head Coach in June of 2016.

In 2020, she was named Head Synchronized Swimming Coach at Texas Woman's University in Denton, Texas, closer to her native town of DeSoto, Texas.

=== Honors ===
As an athlete, she was nominated for the United States Olympic Committee Sports Woman of the Year as a junior in 2007 and as a senior in 2008. She was named USA Synchronized Swimming Athlete of the Year twice.

While at Stanford, in her sophomore year, Lowe received the "Block S" Award from the Stanford Athletics Board as the outstanding female athlete. As a senior, she was chosen the Stanford Athletic Board's Female Athlete of the Year.

In 2013, Lowe was inducted into the United States Synchronized Swimming Hall of Fame for her contributions an athlete and coach.

She has twice been voted USA Synchro Coach of the year, once in 2013, and once in 2016.
