= Miya Tachibana =

Japanese synchronized swimmer

Personal information
- Nationality: Japan
- Born: 12 December 1974 (age 51) Ōtsu, Japan
- Height: 1.70 m (5 ft 7 in)
- Weight: 55 kg (121 lb)

Sport
- Sport: Swimming
- Strokes: Synchronised swimming
- Club: Osaka Sayama
Medal record
Women's synchronised swimming
Representing Japan
Olympic Games
Silver medal – second place	2000 Sydney	Duet
Silver medal – second place	2000 Sydney	Team competition
Silver medal – second place	2004 Athens	Duet
Silver medal – second place	2004 Athens	Team competition
Bronze medal – third place	1996 Atlanta	Team competition
World Aquatics Championships
Gold medal – first place	2001 Fukuoka	Duet
Silver medal – second place	1994 Rome	Duet
Silver medal – second place	1998 Perth	Duet
Silver medal – second place	1998 Perth	Team
Silver medal – second place	2003 Barcelona	Duet
Bronze medal – third place	1994 Rome	Team
Bronze medal – third place	1998 Perth	Solo
Bronze medal – third place	2001 Fukuoka	Solo
Asian Games
Gold medal – first place	2002 Busan	Duet
- Updated on 5 May 2020

Miya Tachibana (立花 美哉, Tachibana Miya; born December 12, 1974) is a Japanese competitor in synchronised swimming from Ōtsu, Shiga. Tachibana began practicing the sport during her fourth year in elementary school. She was inducted into the International Swimming Hall of Fame in 2011.

== World Aquatics Championships ==
Tachibana has won eight medals at World Aquatics Championships. Her duet gold medal, won with Miho Takeda at the 2001 Fukuoka Championships, was the first gold medal for a Japanese synchronised swimming team in the history of the tournament.

== Asian Games ==
Tachibana won a gold medal in the duet event at the 2002 Busan Asian Games.

== Olympics ==
She received five Olympic medals at the 1996, the 2000 and the 2004 Summer Olympics. The silver medal from the 2000 Olympics was in the duet with Miho Takeda, and they also received a silver medal at the 2004 Olympics.

== After competition ==
Tachibana retired following the 2004 Athens Olympics. She moved on to a coaching role, working alongside Masayo Imura (known in Japan as “the mother of synchro”).

During the summer of 2008, she was a synchronized swimming coach for the Santa Clara Aquamaids in Santa Clara, California.

After this, Tachibana coached at the Imura Synchro Club.

== Personal life ==
In February, 2012, Tachibana announced that she would be marrying an office worker living in Osaka.
