= Miho Takeda =

Japanese synchronized swimmer

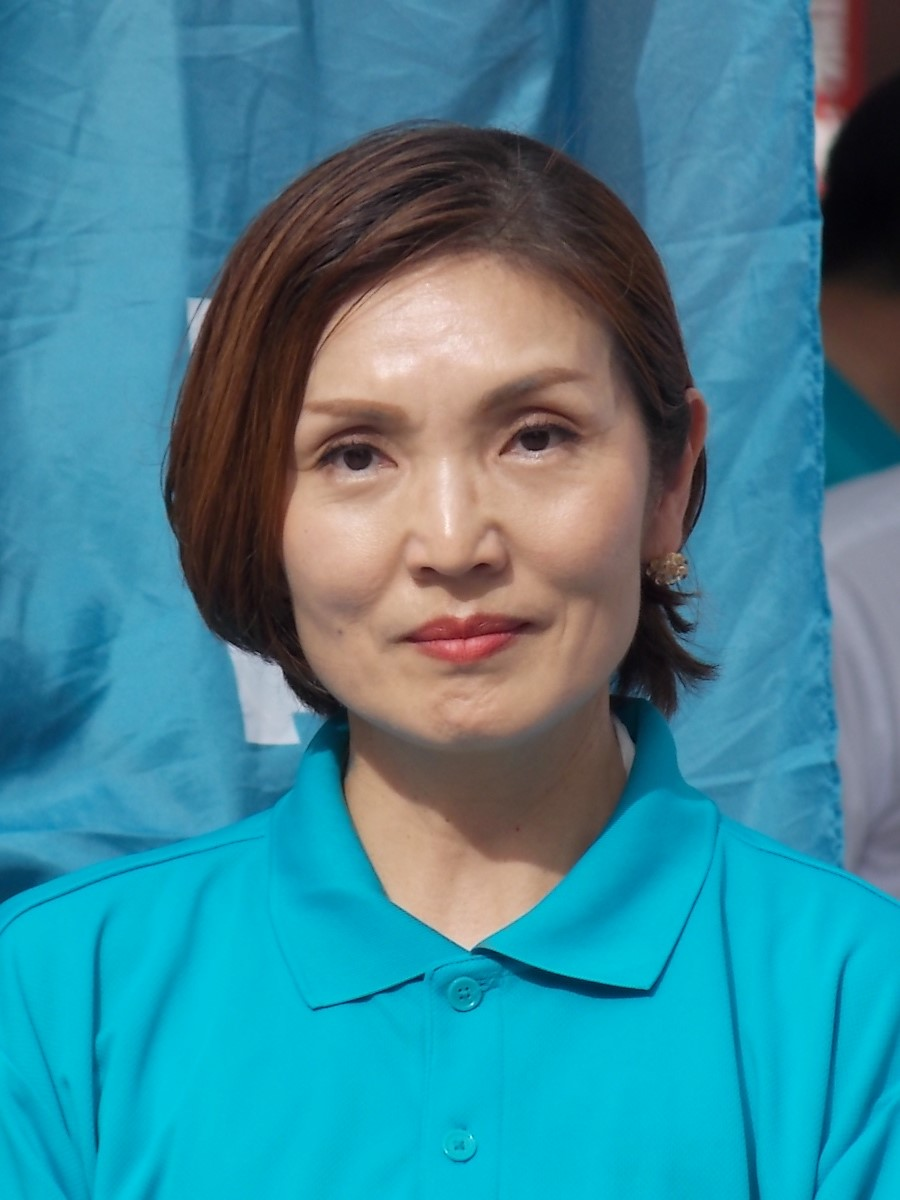

Personal information
- Nationality: Japan
- Born: 13 September 1976 (age 49) Kyoto, Japan
- Height: 1.65 m (5 ft 5 in)
- Weight: 54 kg (119 lb)

Sport
- Sport: Swimming
- Strokes: Synchronized swimming
- Club: Osaka Sayama
Medal record
Women's synchronized swimming
Representing Japan
Olympic Games
Silver medal – second place	2000 Sydney	Duet
Silver medal – second place	2000 Sydney	Team competition
Silver medal – second place	2004 Athens	Duet
Silver medal – second place	2004 Athens	Team competition
Bronze medal – third place	1996 Atlanta	Team competition
Asian Games
Gold medal – first place	2002 Busan	Duet
- Updated on 5 May 2020

Miho Takeda (武田 美保, Takeda Miho; born September 13, 1976 in Kyoto) is a Japanese competitor in synchronized swimming.

She received five Olympic medals at the 1996, 2000 and 2004 Summer Olympics. The silver medal from the 2000 Olympics was in the duet with Miya Tachibana, and they also received a silver medal at the 2004 Olympics.

Miho is a graduate of Ritsumeikan University and the wife of Governor Eikei Suzuki of Mie.
