= Jessica Chase =

Canadian synchronized swimmer

Personal information
- Born: July 11, 1978 (age 47) Montreal, Quebec, Canada

Sport
- Sport: Swimming
- Strokes: Synchronised swimming
Medal record
Representing Canada
Synchronised swimming
Olympic Games
Bronze medal – third place	2000 Sydney	Team Event
World Championships
Bronze medal – third place	2001 Fukuoka	Team Event
Pan American Games
Gold medal – first place	1999 Winnipeg	Team

Jessica Chase (born July 11, 1978) is a Canadian synchronized swimmer who competed in the Sydney and Athens Olympics.

Chase won a bronze medal at the team event at the 2000 Summer Olympics and at the 2001 world championships in Fukuoka, Japan. Chase competed and finished fifth at the 2004 Summer Olympics in Athens with Canadian team.
