= Fanny Létourneau =

Canadian synchronized swimmer

Personal information
- Born: June 24, 1979 (age 47) Quebec City, Quebec, Canada

Sport
- Sport: Swimming
- Strokes: Synchronized swimming
Medal record
Women's synchronized swimming
Representing Canada
Olympic Games
Bronze medal – third place	2000 Sydney	Team event
World Championships
Bronze medal – third place	2001 Fukuoka	Duet
Bronze medal – third place	2001 Fukuoka	Team event
Pan American Games
Gold medal – first place	1999 Winnipeg	Duet
Gold medal – first place	1999 Winnipeg	Team
Silver medal – second place	2003 Santo Domingo	Duet

Fanny Létourneau (born June 24, 1979) is a Canadian former synchronized swimmer and Olympian.

== Career ==
Létourneau was a two-time Olympian, competing for Canada in the team and duet events at the 2000 Summer Olympics in Sydney, Australia, winning a bronze medal in the team event, and at the 2004 Summer Olympics in Athens, Greece. With partner Claire Carver-Dias Létourneau won gold medals at the 1999 Pan American Games and at the 2002 Commonwealth Games in Manchester. After the 2004 Olympics, Létourneau decided to retire from the sport.
