= List of synchronised swimmers =

This is a list of synchronised swimmers:

== A ==
- (Spain) Leyre Abadía
- (Egypt) Reem Abdalazem
- (Egypt) Aziza Abdelfattah
- (Japan) Atsushi Abe
- (United States) Brooke Abel
- (Mexico) Karem Achach
- (Japan) Yumi Adachi
- (Italy) Beatrice Adelizzi
- (France) Marianne Aeschbacher
- (Egypt) Nour El-Afandi
- (Mexico) Wendy Aguilar
- (Egypt) Samia Ahmed
- (Japan) Kaho Aitaka
- (Japan) Sakiko Akutsu
- (Canada) Lisa Alexander
- (Austria) (Greece) Eirini-Marina Alexandri
- (Austria) (Greece) Vasiliki Alexandri
- (Mexico) Regina Alférez
- (Hungary) Zsófia Almádi
- (United Kingdom) Olivia Allison
- (Uruguay) Paulina Altieri
- (United States) Anita Alvarez
- (Australia) Eloise Amberger
- (Lithuania) Natalija Ambrazaitė
- (Venezuela) Ana Amicarella
- (Spain) Marta Amorós
- (Ukraine) Lolita Ananasova
- (Greece) Aglaia Anastasiou
- (United States) Teresa Andersen
- (Australia) Jenny-Lyn Anderson
- (Italy) Beatrice Andina
- (France) Marie Annequin
- (Indonesia) Rasya Annisa Rahman
- (Singapore) Yvette Ann Chong
- (Spain) Mónica Antich
- (Russia) Yelena Antonova
- (Japan) Ai Aoki
- (Colombia) Mónica Arango
- (Japan) Miho Arai
- (New Zealand) Ashley Armstrong
- (Mexico) Marla Fernanda Arellano
- (Spain) Cristina Arámbula
- (Canada) Emily Armstrong
- (France) Laura Augé
- (Mexico) Daniela Avila Villa
- (Slovenia) Masa Avramovic
- (Spain) Nuria Ayala
- (Russia) Elena Azarova

== B ==
- (United States) Kristen Babb-Sprague
- (Egypt) Lamyaa Badawi
- (Egypt) Hagar Badran
- (United Kingdom) Yvette Baker
- (Netherlands) Hetty Balkenende
- (Italy) Giada Ballan
- (Hungary) Blanka Barbócz
- (Belgium) Renaud Barral
- (Egypt) Nadine Barsoum
- (Hungary) Angelika Bastianelli
- (Cuba) Gabriela Batista
- (United States) Sue Baross Nesbitt
- (United States) Carrie Barton
- (United States) Alison Bartosik
- (Spain) Clara Basiana
- (France) (Russia) Anastasia Bayandina
- (Canada) Lyne Beaumont
- (Canada) Geneviève Bélanger
- (Mexico) Joel Benavides
- (Australia) Coral Bentley
- (Ukraine) Valeriya Berezhna
- (Colombia) Estefania Bernal
- (Czech Republic) Soňa Bernardová
- (South Africa) Olivia Berndt
- (France) Pascale Besson
- (Italy) Serena Bianchi
- (United States) Suzannah Bianco
- (Italy) Valentina Bisi
- (Israel) Eden Blecher
- (Germany) Klara Bleyer
- (Germany) Amelie Blumenthal Haz
- (Israel) Shelly Bobritsky
- (Switzerland) Elisa Boffi
- (Germany) Marlene Bojer
- (Kazakhstan) Nargiza Bolatova
- (Australia) Sarah Bombell
- (Brazil) Luisa Borges
- (Switzerland) Edith Boss
- (Colombia) Luisa Fernanda Botero Manzano
- (Netherlands) Marjolijn Both
- (France) Cinthia Bouhier
- (United Kingdom) Lucy Bowes
- (France) Rachel le Bozec
- (New Zealand) Chloe Boyt
- (Italy) Eliza Bozzo
- (Austria) Nadine Brandl
- (Canada) Janice Bremner
- (Italy) Mara Brunetti
- (Switzerland) Magdalena Brunner
- (Brazil) Maria Bruno
- (Russia) Olga Brusnikina
- (Australia) Hannah Burkhill
- (Italy) Giovanna Burlando
- (Australia) Donella Burridge
- (Australia) Olia Burtaev
- (Croatia) Matea Butorac
- (South Korea) Byun Jae-jun

== C ==
- (Spain) Alba María Cabello
- (Spain) Jordi Caceres
- (Canada) Michelle Calkins
- (Australia) Ethan Calleja
- (Australia) Natalia Caloiero
- (Costa Rica) Florella Calvo
- (United States) Anamaria Camero
- (Canada) Michelle Cameron
- (Chile) Nicolás Campos
- (Mexico) Lourdes Candini
- (New Zealand) Evie Caple
- (France) Anne Capron
- (Spain) Ona Carbonell
- (Mexico) Sonia Cárdeñas
- (Dominican Republic) Ximena Carias
- (Australia) Amelie Carle
- (Mexico) Fernanda Paola Carmona Vazquez
- (Italy) Manuela Carnini
- (Italy) Brunella Carrafelli
- (Argentina) María Carasatorre
- (Brazil) Paula Carvalho
- (Brazil) Tessa Carvalho
- (Canada) Claire Carver-Dias
- (Brazil) Vitoria Casale
- (Italy) Chiara Cassin
- (Colombia) Sara Castaneda
- (Panama) Katherine Castillo Gutierres
- (Venezuela) Jenny Castro
- (France) Léa Catania
- (Brazil) Jullia Catharino
- (Italy) Camilla Cattaneo
- (Italy) Domiziana Cavanna
- (Colombia) Melisa Ceballos
- (Italy) Maurizia Cecconi
- (Italy) Paola Celli
- (United Kingdom) Loya Cenkci
- (Italy) Linda Cerruti
- (Canada) Erin Chan
- (China) Chang Hao
- (China) Chang Si
- (France) Maëva Charbonnier
- (Canada) Jessica Chase
- (China) Chen Xiaojun
- (China) Chen Xuan
- (China) Chen Yu
- (China) Cheng Wentao
- (Ukraine) Anastasiya Chepak
- (Soviet Union) Mariya Chernyayeva
- (Paraguay) Virginie Isabelle Chevalet
- (Hong Kong) Chi Yin Lee
- (Russia) Vlada Chigireva
- (Sweden) Marfa Chargina
- (France) Margaux Chrétien
- (Greece) Maria Christodoulou
- (Hong Kong) Katherine Chu
- (Mexico) Mariana Cifuentes
- (Italy) Monica Cirulli
- (Canada) Karen Clark
- (United Kingdom) Katie Clark
- (United States) Tammy Cleland
- (United States) Claudia Coletti
- (Spain) Abril Conesa
- (Spain) Raquel Corral
- (Spain) Rosa Costa
- (United States) Candy Costie
- (Australia) Georgia Courage-Gardiner
- (United Kingdom) Jodie Cowie
- (Canada) Andrée-Anne Côté
- (Spain) Margalida Crespí
- (Greece) Marios Critsas
- (Netherlands Antilles) Esther Croes
- (United States) Tamara Crow
- (Hungary) Katalin Csilling
- (Colombia) Ingrid Cubillos
- (Malta) Ana Culic
- (United States) Janet Culp
- (Hungary) Eszter Czékus

== D ==
- (Greece) Thaleia Dampali
- (New Zealand) Lisa Daniels
- (New Zealand) Nina Daniels
- (Egypt) Aya Darwish
- (United States) Ivy Davis
- (Australia) Tracey Davis
- (Russia) Anastasia Davydova
- (France) Iphinoé Davvetas
- (United Kingdom) Katie Dawkins
- (France) Virginie Dedieu
- (Italy) Francesca Deidda
- (Mexico) Daniela Delgado Cornejo
- (Mexico) Isabel Delgado
- (Germany) Maria Denisov
- (Ukraine) Olesia Derevianchenko
- (Cuba) Idaili Diaz
- (United States) Emily Ding
- (Spain) Fernando Díaz del Río
- (Mexico) Nuria Diosdado
- (France) Manon Disbeaux
- (United States) Erin Dobratz
- (Italy) Alice Dominici
- (Australia) Tamika Domrow
- (France) Apolline Dreyfuss
- (New Zealand) Jasmine Du
- (Canada) Jessika Dubuc
- (Czech Republic) Alžběta Dufková
- (South Africa) Chloe Dundas-Starr
- (Canada) Stéphanie Durocher
- (United States) Becky Dyroen-Lancer

== E ==
- (Austria) Eva-Maria Edinger
- (Japan) Ayano Egami
- (Netherlands) Catrien Eijken
- (Egypt) Nour Elayoubi
- (Egypt) Amina Elfeky
- (Egypt) Jomana Elmaghrabi
- (Netherlands) Marijke Engelen
- (Russia) Anastasia Ermakova
- (Italy) Beatrice Esegio
- (France) Ambre Esnault
- (Mexico) Daniela Estrada Flores

== F ==
- (France) Charlotte Fabre
- (France) Julie Fabre
- (Mexico) Nara Falcón
- (China) Fan Jiachen
- (Italy) Roberta Farinelli
- (Germany) Anette Feil
- (China) Feng Yu
- (Brazil) Bia and Branca Feres
- (Australia) Celeste Ferraris
- (Spain) Berta Ferreras
- (Brazil) Fabiano Ferreira
- (Spain) Meritxell Ferré
- (Italy) Costanza Ferro
- (Ukraine) Marta Fiedina
- (United States) Megumi Field
- (Brazil) Nayara Figueira
- (Italy) Costanza Fiorentini
- (Switzerland) Pamela Fischer
- (Italy) Manila Flamini
- (Canada) Karen Fonteyne
- (Canada) Jo-Annie Fortin
- (New Zealand) Sascha Fox
- (Sweden) Lassar Frenud
- (Sweden) Sandra Freund
- (Canada) Sylvie Fréchette
- (Germany) Heike Friedrich
- (Greece) Eleftheria Ftouli
- (China) Fu Yuling
- (Spain) Andrea Fuentes
- (Spain) Tina Fuentes
- (Japan) Raika Fujii
- (Japan) Michiyo Fujimaru
- (Japan) Juka Fukumura
- (Australia) Nicole Furst

== G ==
- (Hungary) Boglárka Gács
- (Canada) Marie-Pierre Gagné
- (Italy) Veronica Gallo
- (Canada) Marie-Pier Boudreau Gagnon
- (Canada) Catherine Garceau
- (Chile) Soledad and Trinidad Garcia
- (Spain) Emma García
- (Spain) Marina García Polo
- (Chile) Theodora Garrido
- (Australia) Raphaelle Gauthier
- (Ukraine) Iryna Gayvoronska
- (Australia) Kiera Gazzard
- (Egypt) Dalia El-Gebaly
- (Greece) Eleni Georgiou
- (Australia) Kelly Geraghty
- (Sweden) Malin Gerdin
- (Greece) Krystalenia Gialama
- (Switzerland) Sophie Giger
- (Venezuela) María Elena Giusti
- (France) (Australia) Myriam Glez
- (Israel) Anastasia Gloushkov
- (Ukraine) Maryna Golyadkina
- (France) Laura Gonzalez
- (Spain) Dennis González
- (Mexico) Olivia González
- (United Kingdom) Lian Goodwin
- (Ukraine) Oleksandra Goretska
- (Greece) Effrosyni Gouda
- (Kazakhstan) Irina Govorukhina
- (Hungary) Lilien Götz
- (Ukraine) Olena Grechykhina
- (Israel) Emili Green
- (Russia) Mariya Gromova
- (Switzerland) Emma Grosvenor
- (China) Gu Beibei
- (China) Gu Xiao
- (China) Guan Zewen
- (France) Mayssa Guermoud
- (France) Camille Guerre
- (Germany) Solene Guisard
- (United States) Beulah Gundling
- (China) Guo Cui
- (China) Guo Li
- (Mexico) Berenice Guzmán

== H ==
- (South Korea) Ha Su-gyeong
- (Morocco) Jennah Aida Hafsi
- (Japan) Aika Hakoyama
- (Switzerland) Melody Halbeisen
- (Canada) Sharon Hambrook
- (Australia) Bianca Hammett
- (Germany) Gudrun Hänisch
- (Japan) Saho Harada
- (Egypt) Samar Hassounah
- (Japan) Aiko Hayashi
- (China) He Xiaochu
- (Egypt) Malak Hebesha
- (Spain) Thaïs Henríquez
- (France) Muriel Hermine
- (Spain) Mireia Hernández
- (Japan) Moe Higa
- (Japan) Ikoi Hirota
- (New Zealand) Isabelle Hitchen
- (Singapore) Rachel Ho
- (Aruba) Nicole Hoevertsz
- (United Kingdom) Andrea Holland
- (United Kingdom) Caroline Holmyard
- (United States) Kate Hooven
- (Canada) Paige Hopper
- (Japan) Asaka Hosokawa
- (China) Hou Yingli
- (Canada) Valérie Hould-Marchand
- (Sweden) Anna Hödgal
- (China) Hu Ni
- (China) Huang Xuechen
- (France) Estel-Anaïs Hubaud
- (United States) Bert Hubbard
- (United Kingdom) Holly Hughes
- (Croatia) Antonija Huljev
- (Hungary) Szabina Hungler
- (United States) Keana Hunter
- (South Africa) Tayla-Jade van Huyssteen

== I ==
- (Italy) Marta Iacoacci
- (Switzerland) Caroline Imoberdorf
- (Japan) Masayo Imura
- (Japan) Yukiko Inui
- (Greece) Apostolia Ioannou
- (Canada) Chloé Isaac
- (Russia) Natalia Ishchenko
- (Japan) Yumiko Ishiguro
- (Kazakhstan) Irada Islamova
- (Kazakhstan) Yasmina Islamova
- (Japan) Yoko Isoda
- (Japan) Megumi Itō
- (Japan) Mayo Itoyama
- (Ukraine) Daria Iushko

== J ==
- (Sweden) Marie Jacobsson
- (Kazakhstan) Dayana Jamanchalova
- (North Korea) Jang Hyang-mi
- (France) Claudia Janvier
- (Hong Kong) Cheng Jasmine
- (United States) Rebecca Jasontek
- (Costa Rica) Natalia Jenkins
- (Czech Republic) Karolína Jetmarová
- (China) Jiang Tingting
- (China) Jiang Wenwen
- (Japan) Rei Jimbo
- (Spain) Cecilia Jiménez
- (Mexico) Joana Jiménez
- (China) Jin Na
- (Cuba) Talia Joa Fernandez
- (South Africa) Clarissa Johnston
- (United States) Christina Jones
- (North Korea) Jong Yon-hui
- (Australia) it:Margo Joseph-Kuo
- (United States) Karen Josephson
- (United States) Sarah Josephson
- (France) May Jouvenez
- (Spain) María Juárez

== K ==
- (Russia) Mikhaela Kalancha
- (Kazakhstan) Makpal Kalmurzayeva
- (Czech Republic) Barbora Kalvodová
- (Greece) Athina Kamarinopoulou
- (Greece) Estella Karamanidou
- (Greece) Zoi Karangelou
- (Greece) Ismini Maria Karavasili
- (Kazakhstan) Aliya Karimova
- (France) Chloé Kautzmann
- (Japan) Miho Kawabe
- (Japan) Akiko Kawase
- (Japan) Yuka Kawase
- (Japan) Naoko Kawashima
- (Hungary) Kira Kecskés
- (Australia) Annette Kellermann
- (Kazakhstan) Ainur Kerey
- (Australia) Danielle Kettlewell
- (Egypt) Youmna Khallaf
- (Russia) Elvira Khasyanova
- (Japan) Moeka Kijima
- (United States) Mary Killman
- (United States) Becky Kim
- (South Korea) Kim Mi-jinsu
- (North Korea) Kim Yong-mi
- (Japan) Saeko Kimura
- (Australia) (Canada) Kirsten Kinash
- (Georgia (country)) Ani Kipiani
- (Russia) Mariya Kiselyova
- (Japan) Kanako Kitao
- (Hungary) Szofi Kiss
- (Spain) Paula Klamburg
- (Czech Republic) Karolína Klusková
- (Ukraine) Ganna Klymenko
- (Canada) (United Kingdom) Jennifer Knobbs
- (Japan) Chisa Kobayashi
- (Japan) Hiromi Kobayashi
- (Japan) Uta Kobayashi
- (Switzerland) Vivienne Koch
- (Russia) Svetlana Kolesnichenko
- (Japan) Erika Komura
- (Japan) Takako Konishi
- (Japan) Minami Kono
- (Canada) Dominika Kopcik
- (Canada) Emilia Kopcik
- (India) Kavita Kolapkar
- (Russia) Daria Korobova
- (United States) Mariya Koroleva
- (Serbia) Maja Kos
- (Japan) Mikako Kotani
- (Greece) Stylianos Koukouselis Fouskis
- (Greece) Artemi Koutraki
- (Greece) Evgenia Koutsoudi
- (Russia) (United States) Anna Kozlova
- (Switzerland) Sascia Kraus
- (Greece) Ifiyeneia Krommydaki
- (Canada) Kelly Kryczka
- (Brazil) Isabella Kuhlmann Ricetto
- (Canada) Kasia Kulesza
- (Kazakhstan) Anna Kulkina
- (Belarus) Katsiaryna Kulpo
- (Japan) Hinata Kumagai
- (Kazakhstan) Aigerim Kurmangaliyeva
- (Russia) Olga Kuzhela
- (Japan) Okina Kyogoku

== L ==
- (France) Sara Labrousse
- (Chile) Macarena Lagos
- (France) Christine Lagarde
- (Australia) Amanda Laird
- (Canada) Éve Lamoureux
- (Austria) Livia Lang
- (Italy) Giulia Lapi
- (Canada) Christine Larsen
- (Finland) Liisa Laurila
- (United Kingdom) Aimee Lawrence
- (Mexico) Erika Leal-Ramirez
- (Mexico) Lilián Leal
- (Canada) Stéphanie Leclair
- (United States) Emily LeSueur
- (Canada) Fanny Létourneau
- (Spain) Sara Levy
- (Czech Republic) Julie Lewczyszynová
- (China) Li Min
- (China) Li Rouping
- (China) Li Xiaolu
- (China) Li Yuanyuan
- (China) Li Zhen
- (China) Liang Xinping
- (Australia) Dannielle Liesch
- (Australia) Lisa Lieschke
- (France) Myriam Lignot
- (United States) Padded Lilies
- (Brazil) Isabella Lima Viana
- (Switzerland) Ladina Lippuner
- (Canada) Tracy Little
- (United States) Calista Liu
- (China) Liu Ou
- (Spain) Lilou Lluís
- (United Kingdom) Daniella Lloyd
- (Brazil) Cristiana Lobo
- (China) Long Yan
- (Brazil) Luiza Lopes
- (Spain) Eva López
- (Spain) Laura López
- (Aruba) Roswitha Lopez
- (United States) Sara Lowe
- (United Kingdom) Vicki Lucass
- (Italy) Alessia Lucchini
- (United States) Kristina Lum
- (France) Romane Lunel
- (China) Luo Xi (born 1969)
- (China) Luo Xi (born 1987)
- (United States) Jacklyn Luu

== M ==
- (Italy) Alessia Macchi
- (Brazil) Érika MacDavid
- (South Africa) Skye MacDonald
- (Italy) Giorgia Lucia Macino
- (Egypt) Maryam Maghraby
- (Austria) Elisabeth Mahn
- (Czech Republic) Silvia Majerova
- (Kazakhstan) Xeniya Makarova
- (South Africa) Phindy Makhaye
- (Greece) Evanthia Makrygianni
- (Greece) Sofia Malkogeorgou
- (Russia) Aleksandr Maltsev
- (South Africa) Emma Manners-Wood
- (Guinea) Alexandra Mansare-Traore
- (Italy) Ginevra Marchetti
- (Canada) Élise Marcotte
- (Egypt) Salma Marei
- (France) Delphine Maréchal
- (Brazil) Sara Marinho
- (United States) Elicia Marshall
- (Germany) Daria Martens
- (Mexico) Ana Martínez
- (Sweden) David Martínez
- (Liechtenstein) Leila Marxel
- (Israel) Aya Mazor
- (Japan) Kei Marumo
- (Spain) Meritxell Mas
- (France) Charlotte Massardier
- (Italy) Sofia Mastroianni
- (Japan) Ayako Matsumura
- (United States) Bill May
- (United States) Lauren McFall
- (Canada) Beverly McKnight
- (Uruguay) Agustina Medina
- (Mexico) Ariadna Medina
- (France) Lila Meesseman-Bakir
- (Hong Kong) Zhao Meyako
- (Spain) Elena Melián
- (Spain) Gemma Mengual
- (Brazil) Laura Miccuci
- (Serbia) Vanja Mičeta
- (United States) Tuesday Middaugh
- (Italy) Giorgio Minisini
- (Greece) Andriana Misikevych
- (Japan) Risako Mitsui
- (Egypt) Mai Mohamed
- (Egypt) Sondos Mohamed
- (Egypt) Laila Mohsen
- (Egypt) Dahlia Mokbel
- (Cuba) Alejandra Molina
- (Spain) Ana Montero
- (Malta) Zea Montfort
- (Spain) Irene Montrucchio
- (Brazil) Carolina Moraes
- (Brazil) Isabela Moraes
- (Aruba) Mikayla Morales
- (Switzerland) Milla Morel
- (Spain) Gisela Morón
- (Uzbekistan) Anastasiya Morozova
- (New Zealand) Eva Morris
- (Japan) Miwako Motoyoshi
- (Italy) Marta Murru
- (Italy) Viola Musso
- (Germany) Monika Müller
- (Austria) Beatrix Müllner
- (Austria) Christine Müllner
- (Switzerland) Sofie Müntener
- (Greece) Georgia Myrto Zangana

== N ==
- (Canada) Shayna Nackoney
- (Japan) Riho Nakajima
- (Japan) Kanami Nakamaki
- (Japan) Mai Nakamura
- (Georgia (country)) Nita Natobadzel
- (United States) Stephanie Nesbitt
- (Canada) Jonnie Newman
- (Australia) Cliodhna Ni Cathain
- (Australia) Leonie Nichols
- (Russia) Liliia Nizamova
- (Canada) Kirstin Normand
- (United Kingdom) Sarah Northey
- (United States) Andrea Nott
- (Mexico) Claudia Novelo
- (Russia) Olga Novokshchenova
- (Brazil) Ana Beatriz Nunes
- (Indonesia) Nurfa Nurul Utami
- (Italy) Letizia Nuzzo
- (Switzerland) Anja Nyffeler

== O ==
- (Japan) Fumiko Okuno
- (Australia) Irena Olevsky
- (Mexico) Lourdes Olivera
- (Russia) Anisya Olkhova
- (Egypt) Mariam Omar
- (Japan) Kano Omata
- (Singapore) Rae-Anne Org
- (United States) Annabelle Orme
- (Australia) Katrina Orpwood
- (Japan) Yuriko Osawa
- (Chile) Carla Otero
- (Australia) Tarren Otte
- (Russia) Yelena Ovchinnikova
- (Belgium) Katia Overfeldt
- (Australia) Frankie Owen
- (Spain) Alisa Ozhogina

== P ==
- (Italy) Joey Paccagnella
- (China) Pan Yan
- (Greece) Lydia Papanastasiou
- (Greece) Evangelia Papazoglou
- (Belarus) Nastassia Parfenava
- (South Korea) Park Hyun-ha
- (South Korea) Park Hyun-sun
- (Russia) Alexandra Patskevich
- (Kazakhstan) Anna Pavletsova
- (United States) Heather Pease
- (Switzerland) Claudia Peczinka
- (Italy) Susanna Pedotti
- (Greece) Olga Pelekanou
- (United States) Jill Penner
- (Greece) Despoina Pentza
- (Uruguay) Tamar Perez
- (Switzerland) Madeleine Perk
- (Italy) Mariangela Perrupato
- (Russia) Irina Pershina
- (Uruguay) Lucía Pérez
- (Switzerland) Noemi Peschl
- (Slovenia) Karin Pesrl
- (Canada) Sara Petrov
- (Italy) Alessia Pezone
- (Italy) Enrica Piccoli
- (Argentina) Camila Pineda Bootello
- (Italy) Elisa Plaisant
- (France) Eve Planeix
- (Canada) (Austria) Raphaelle Plante
- (Greece) Evangelia Platanioti
- (Spain) Laia Pons
- (Switzerland) Alice Ponsar
- (France) Lauriane Pontat
- (Italy) Clara Porchetto
- (Brazil) Marina Postal
- (Australia) Zoe Poulis
- (South Africa) Aurelia Pretorius
- (Canada) Kenzie Priddell
- (Chile) Fiona Prieto
- (United States) Kim Probst
- (Russia) Elena Prokofyeva

== Q ==
- (Canada) Kiara Quieti
- (Peru) Sandy Quiroz Villaran

== R ==
- (Egypt) Farida Radwan
- (United States) Daniella Ramirez
- (Mexico) Perla Ramírez
- (Mexico) Pilar Ramírez
- (Spain) Paula Ramírez
- (Canada) Isabelle Rampling
- (United Kingdom) Asha Randall
- (United Kingdom) Genevieve Randall
- (United Kingdom) Jenna Randall
- (Greece) Ilektra Rapti
- (France) Magali Rathier
- (Kazakhstan) Aldiyar Ramazanov
- (Australia) (Singapore) Carolyn Rayna Buckle
- (Canada) Cari Read
- (Brazil) Gabriela Regly
- (Mexico) Aline Reich
- (Mexico) Ingrid Reich
- (Australia) Samantha Reid
- (Germany) Daniela Reinhardt
- (United States) (Australia) Ruby Remati
- (China) (Australia) Rachel Ren
- (Canada) Anouk Renière-Lafrenière
- (Russia) Kateryna Reznik
- (Spain) Pau Ribes
- (France) Lisa Richaud
- (Brazil) Eva Riera
- (Italy) Sarah Maria Rizea
- (France) Éva Riffet
- (Greece) Sofia Rigakou
- (Italy) Carmen Rocchino
- (Spain) Irina Rodríguez
- (Mexico) Luisa Rodríguez Rubio
- (Cuba) Rodsany Rodríguez
- (Australia) Semon Rohloff
- (Russia) Svetlana Romashina
- (Venezuela) Anastasia Roque
- (United Kingdom) Sophie Rowney
- (Italy) Lucrezia Ruggiero
- (Puerto Rico) Javier Ruisanchez
- (United States) Tracie Ruiz
- (Venezuela) Virgina Ruíz
- (New Zealand) Jennifer Russanov
- (Uzbekistan) Anastasiya Ruzmetova
- (Czech Republic) Jana Rybářová

== S ==
- (Egypt) Nehal Saafan
- (Egypt) Nihal Saafan
- (Ukraine) Oleksandra Sabada
- (New Zealand) Katie Sadleir
- (New Zealand) Lynette Sadleir
- (Ukraine) Kateryna Sadurska
- (Japan) Mariko Sakai
- (Italy) Federica Sala
- (Spain) Sara Saldaña
- (Egypt) Nouran Saleh
- (Spain) Cristina Salvador
- (Egypt) Maryam Samer
- (Argentina) Etel Sánchez
- (Colombia) Gustavo Sánchez
- (Argentina) Sofía Sánchez
- (Malaysia) Sara Kamil-Yusof
- (Japan) Tomoka Sato
- (Ukraine) Anastasiya Savchuk
- (United States) Jill Savery
- (Italy) Sara Savoia
- (Egypt) Shaza El-Sayed
- (Canada) Claire Scheffel
- (Germany) Gerlind Scheller
- (Italy) Dalila Schiesaro
- (Czech Republic) Sofie Schindlerová
- (Switzerland) Belinda Schmid
- (Switzerland) Ariane Schneider
- (United States) Nathalie Schneyder
- (Germany) Margit Schreib
- (South Africa) Kate Schropfer
- (United States) Lindi Schroeder
- (France) Karine Schuler
- (Switzerland) Babou Schupbach
- (Russia) Olga Sedakova
- (Germany) Frithjof Seidel
- (Switzerland) Alicia Semon
- (Serbia) Marija Senica
- (Slovenia) Nika Seljak
- (Belgium) Patricia Serneels
- (Spain) Ione Serrano
- (Italy) Sara Sgarzi
- (United Kingdom) Kerry Shacklock
- (Kazakhstan) Galina Shatnaya
- (United Kingdom) Nicola Shearn
- (Australia) Cristina Sheehan
- (China) Shi Xin
- (Japan) Ayano Shimada
- (Japan) Nao Shirahase
- (Russia) Alla Shishkina
- (Russia) Anna Shorina
- (United Kingdom) Kate Shortman
- (Russia) Maria Shurochkina
- (United States) Heather Simmons-Carrasco
- (Canada) Jacqueline Simoneau
- (Switzerland) Karin Singer
- (Barbados) Chemene Sinson
- (United Kingdom) Katie Skelton
- (Australia) Charlotte Smith
- (United States) Kenyon Smith
- (Mexico) Jessica Sobrino
- (Singapore) Debbie Soh
- (Costa Rica) Mariana Solis
- (Dominican Republic) Maribel Solis
- (Greece) Despoina Solomou
- (Canada) Jennifer Song
- (Thailand) Supitchaya Songpan
- (Brazil) Gláucia Soutinho
- (Russia) Yelena Soya
- (Italy) Beatrice Spaziani
- (Italy) Isotta Sportelli
- (Australia) Lisa Steanes
- (New Zealand) Karlina Steiner
- (Canada) Courtenay Stewart
- (Kazakhstan) Valeriya Stolbunova
- (Austria) Valentina Strahsberger
- (Slovakia) Žofia Strapeková
- (Canada) Heather Strong
- (South Africa) Laura Strugnell
- (Russia) Varvara Subbotina
- (United States) Jill Sudduth
- (China) Sun Qiuting
- (China) Sun Wenyan
- (China) Sun Yijing
- (Japan) Emiko Suzuki
- (Japan) Hikari Suzuki
- (Czech Republic) Lucie Svrčinová
- (United Kingdom) Robyn Swatman
- (South Africa) Ayrton Sweeney
- (Ukraine) Kseniya Sydorenko

== T ==
- (Italy) Sophie Tabbiani
- (Japan) Masako Tachibana
- (Japan) Miya Tachibana
- (Canada) Vivien Tai
- (Canada) Jacinthe Taillon
- (Japan) Kaori Takahashi
- (Japan) Aki Takayama
- (Japan) Miho Takeda
- (Hungary) Blanka Taksonyi
- (Singapore) Caithyn Anne Tan
- (Singapore) Clarie Tan
- (China) Tan Min
- (Japan) Junko Tanaka
- (Japan) Miyako Tanaka
- (China) Tang Mengni
- (China) Tao Hong
- (Spain) Ana Tarrés
- (Japan) Asuka Tasaki
- (Colombia) Nicolas Tascon
- (Japan) Juri Tatsumi
- (Canada) Reidun Tatham
- (South Africa) Amanda Taylor
- (Brazil) Lara Teixeira
- (France) Romane Temessek
- (Italy) Antonella Terenzi
- (Sweden) Clara Ternström
- (Greece) Christina Thalassinidou
- (Greece) Vasiliki Thanou
- (Singapore) Rachel Thean
- (Singapore) Rhea Thean
- (Greece) Despoina Theodoridou
- (France) Laure Thibaud
- (United States) Margot Thien
- (Canada) Karine Thomas
- (United States) Ruth Pickett Thompson
- (United Kingdom) Isabelle Thorpe
- (Aruba) Yvette Thuis
- (Russia) Angelika Timanina
- (Spain) Paola Tirados
- (Soviet Union) Tatyana Titova
- (Spain) Iris Tió
- (Kazakhstan) Arna Toktagan
- (Spain) Blanca Toledano
- (Germany) Daria Tonn
- (Russia) Gelena Topilina
- (Mexico) Pamela Toscano Millan
- (Uzbekistan) Khonzodakhon Toshkhujaeva
- (Egypt) Malak Toson
- (France) Charlotte et Laura Tremble
- (Greece) Danai Tsaprali
- (Japan) Mayu Tsukamoto
- (Kazakhstan) Yasmin Tuyakova

== U ==
- (Japan) Sakurako Uchida

== V ==
- (United Kingdom) Laila Vakil
- (Russia) Darina Valitova
- (Mexico) Olga Vargas
- (Chile) Rocio Vargas
- (Cuba) Dayaris Varona
- (Netherlands) Bianca van der Velden
- (Netherlands) Sonja van der Velden
- (Canada) Helen Vanderburg
- (Switzerland) Margaux Varesio
- (Russia) Yuliya Vasilyeva
- (Russia) Olga Vasyukova
- (United States) Natalia Vega
- (Brazil) Fernanda Veirano
- (Brazil) Anna Veloso
- (Italy) Flaminia Vernice
- (Italy) Giulia Vernice
- (Uruguay) Lucia Ververis
- (Mexico) Patricia Vila
- (Canada) Penny Vilagos
- (Canada) Vicky Vilagos
- (Slovakia) Isabella Vilímová
- (Mexico) Diego Villalobos
- (South Africa) Marin Vine
- (Ukraine) Anna Voloshyna

== W ==
- (Canada) Carolyn Waldo
- (China) Wang Fang
- (China) Wang Liuyi
- (China) Wang Na
- (North Korea) Wang Ok-gyong
- (China) Wang Qianyi
- (China) Wang Xiaojie
- (Australia) Milena Waldmann
- (Australia) Bethany Walsh
- (Canada) Estella Warren
- (Canada) Valerie Welsh
- (Australia) Cathryn Wightman
- (France) Chloé Willhelm
- (United Kingdom) Amelie Williams
- (South Africa) Casey Williams
- (South Africa) Sarah Williams
- (United Kingdom) Carolyn Wilson
- (Hong Kong) Wong Wing Ka
- (Canada) Erin Woodley
- (Austria) Alexandra Worisch
- (New Zealand) Eden Worsley
- (China) Wu Chunlan
- (China) Wu Yiwen
- (South Africa) Loren Wulfsohn
- (United States) Kim Wurzel

== X ==
- (China) Xia Ye
- (China) Xiang Binxuan
- (China) Xiao Yanning
- (China) Xu Huiyan
- (United States) Karen Xue

== Y ==
- (Hong Kong) Lam Nok Yan Lauren
- (Japan) Akane Yanagisawa
- (Japan) Mashiro Yasunaga
- (Russia) Anastasiya Yermakova
- (China) Yin Chengxin
- (Israel) Inna Yoffe
- (Japan) Yoko Yoneda
- (Japan) Yuko Yoneda
- (Japan) Kurumi Yoshida
- (Japan) Megumu Yoshida
- (Japan) Rie Yoshida
- (Australia) Naomi Young
- (Egypt) Sahar Youssef
- (China) Yu Lele

== Z ==
- (Italy) Lorena Zaffalon
- (Italy) Laura Zanazza
- (United States) Kendra Zanotto
- (China) Zeng Zhen
- (China) Zhang Xiaohuan
- (China) Zhang Ying
- (Kazakhstan) Aigerim Zhexembinova
- (Germany) Michelle Zimmer
- (Ukraine) Olha Zolotarova
- (Russia) Aleksandra Zueva
- (Netherlands) Tamara Zwart
