= List of European Aquatics Championships medalists in artistic swimming =

This is the complete list of LEN European Aquatics Championships medalists in artistic swimming since 1974.

== Solo free routine ==
Event	Gold	Silver	Bronze
Vienna 1974	Jane Holland; Great Britain	Angelika Honsbeek; Netherlands	Brigitte Serwonski; West Germany
Jönköping 1977	Jackie Cox; Great Britain	Marijke Engelen; Netherlands	Renate Baur; Switzerland
Split 1981	Carolyn Wilson; Great Britain	Alexandra Worisch; Austria	Marijke Engelen; Netherlands
Rome 1983	Carolyn Wilson; Great Britain	Muriel Hermine; France	Gudrun Hänisch; West Germany
Sofia 1985	Carolyn Wilson; Great Britain	Muriel Hermine; France	Alexandra Worisch; Austria
Strasbourg 1987	Muriel Hermine; France	Alexandra Worisch; Austria	Karin Singer; Switzerland
Bonn 1989	Khristina Falasinidi; Soviet Union	Karine Schuler; France	Karin Singer; Switzerland
Athens 1991	Olga Sedakova; Soviet Union	Khristina Falasinidi; Greece	Anne Capron; France
Sheffield 1993	Olga Sedakova; Russia	Marianne Aeschbacher; France	Kerry Shacklock; Great Britain
Vienna 1995	Olga Sedakova; Russia	Marianne Aeschbacher; France	Khristina Falasinidi; Greece
Sevilla 1997	Olga Sedakova; Russia	Virginie Dedieu; France	Giovanna Burlando; Italy
Istanbul 1999	Olga Brusnikina; Russia	Virginie Dedieu; France	Giovanna Burlando; Italy
Helsinki 2000	Olga Brusnikina; Russia	Virginie Dedieu; France	Gemma Mengual; Spain
Berlin 2002	Virginie Dedieu; France	Anastasija Davydova; Russia	Gemma Mengual; Spain
Madrid 2004	Virginie Dedieu; France	Natalja Iščenko; Russia	Gemma Mengual; Spain
Budapest 2006	Natalja Iščenko; Russia	Gemma Mengual; Spain	Nathalia Anthopoulou; Greece
Eindhoven 2008	Gemma Mengual; Spain	Natalja Iščenko; Russia	Beatrice Adelizzi; Italy
Budapest 2010	Natalja Iščenko; Russia	Andrea Fuentes; Spain	Lolita Ananasova; Ukraine
Eindhoven 2012	Natalja Iščenko; Russia	Andrea Fuentes; Spain	Lolita Ananasova; Ukraine
Berlin 2014	Svetlana Romashina; Russia	Ona Carbonell; Spain	Anna Voloshyna; Ukraine
London 2016	Natalja Iščenko; Russia	Anna Vološyna; Ukraine	Linda Cerruti; Italy
Glasgow 2018	Svetlana Kolesničenko; Russia	Linda Cerruti; Italy	Yelyzaveta Yakhno; Ukraine
Budapest 2020	Varvara Subbotina; Russia	Marta Fiedina; Ukraine	Evangelia Platanioti; Greece
Rome 2022	Marta Fiedina; Ukraine	Linda Cerruti; Italy	Vasiliki Alexandri; Austria
Belgrade 2024	Vasiliki Alexandri; Austria	Klara Bleyer; Germany	Marloes Steenbeek; Netherlands

== Solo technical routine ==
Event	Gold	Silver	Bronze
London 2016	Svetlana Romashina; Russia	Anna Vološyna; Ukraine	Linda Cerruti; Italy
Glasgow 2018	Svetlana Kolesničenko; Russia	Yelyzaveta Yakhno; Ukraine	Linda Cerruti; Italy
Budapest 2020	Marta Fiedina; Ukraine	Evangelia Platanioti; Greece	Vasilina Khandoshka; Belarus
Rome 2022	Marta Fiedina; Ukraine	Linda Cerruti; Italy	Vasiliki Alexandri; Austria
Belgrade 2024	Vasiliki Alexandri; Austria	Klara Bleyer; Germany	Marloes Steenbeek; Netherlands

== Duet free routine ==
Event	Gold	Silver	Bronze
Vienna 1974	Great Britain; Jane Holland; Jennifer Lane	West Germany; Beate Mäckle; Brigitte Serwonski	Netherlands; Helma Giuvers; Angelika Honsbeek
Jönköping 1977	Great Britain; Jackie Cox; Andrea Holland	Netherlands; Marijke Engelen; Helma Giuvers	Switzerland; Renate Baur; Liselotte Meyer
Split 1981	Great Britain; Caroline Holmyard; Carolyn Wilson	Netherlands; Catrien Eijken; Marijke Engelen	Austria; Eva-Maria Edinger; Alexandra Worisch
Rome 1983	Great Britain; Amanda Dodd; Carolyn Wilson	West Germany; Gudrun Hänisch; Gerlind Scheller	Netherlands; Catrien Eijken; Marijke Engelen
Sofia 1985	Austria; Eva-Maria Edinger; Alexandra Worisch	France; Pascale Besson; Muriel Hermine	Great Britain; Amanda Dodd; Carolyn Wilson
Strasbourg 1987	France; Muriel Hermine; Karine Schuler	Switzerland; Edith Boss; Karin Singer	Soviet Union; Irina Čukova; Tatyana Titova
Bonn 1989	France; Marianne Aeschbacher; Karine Schuler	Soviet Union; Marija Čerjaeva; Elena Fročeskaja	Switzerland; Edith Boss; Karin Singer
Athens 1991	Soviet Union; Olga Sedakova; Anna Kozlova	France; Anne Capron; Céline Leveque	Netherlands; Marjolijn Both; Tamara Zwart
Sheffield 1993	Russia; Anna Kozlova; Olga Sedakova	France; Marianne Aeschbacher; Céline Leveque	Great Britain; Kerry Shacklock; Laila Vakil
Vienna 1995	Russia; Elena Azarova; Marija Kiselëva	France; Marianne Aeschbacher; Myriam Lignot	Italy; Giovanna Burlando; Manuela Carnini
Siviglia 1997	Russia; Olga Brusnikina; Marija Kiselëva	France; Virginie Dedieu; Myriam Lignot	Italy; Giada Ballan; Serena Bianchi
Istanbul 1999	Russia; Olga Brusnikina; Marija Kiselëva	France; Virginie Dedieu; Myriam Lignot	Italy; Giovanna Burlando; Maurizia Cecconi
Helsinki 2000	Russia; Olga Brusnikina; Marija Kiselëva	France; Virginie Dedieu; Myriam Lignot	Spain; Gemma Mengual; Paola Tirados
Berlin 2002	Russia; Anastasija Davydova; Anastasija Ermakova	Spain; Gemma Mengual; Paola Tirados	France; Virginie Dedieu; Myriam Glez
Madrid 2004	Russia; Anastasija Davydova; Anastasija Ermakova	Spain; Gemma Mengual; Paola Tirados	France; Virginie Dedieu; Laure Thibaud
Budapest 2006	Russia; Anastasija Davydova; Anastasija Ermakova	Spain; Gemma Mengual; Paola Tirados	Greece; Eleftheria Ftouli; Evanthia Makrygianni
Eindhoven 2008	Spain; Gemma Mengual; Andrea Fuentes	Italy; Beatrice Adelizzi; Giulia Lapi	Ukraine; Dar'ja Juško; Ksenija Sydorenko
Budapest 2010	Russia; Natal'ja Iščenko; Svetlana Romašina	Spain; Ona Carbonell; Andrea Fuentes	Ukraine; Dar'ja Juško; Ksenija Sydorenko
Eindhoven 2012	Russia; Natal'ja Iščenko; Svetlana Romašina	Spain; Ona Carbonell; Andrea Fuentes	Ukraine; Dar'ja Juško; Ksenija Sydorenko
Berlino 2014	Russia; Daria Korobova; Svetlana Kolesnichenko	Ukraine; Lolita Ananasova; Anna Voloshyna	Spain; Ona Carbonell; Paula Klamburg
London 2016	Russia; Natal'ja Iščenko; Svetlana Romašina	Ukraine; Lolita Ananasova; Anna Vološyna	Italy; Linda Cerruti; Costanza Ferro
Glasgow 2018	Russia; Svetlana Kolesničenko; Varvara Subbotina	Ukraine; Anastasija Savčuk; Yelyzaveta Yakhno	Italy; Linda Cerruti; Costanza Ferro
Budapest 2020	Russia; Svetlana Kolesničenko; Svetlana Romashina	Ukraine; Anastasija Savčuk; Marta Fiedina	Austria; Anna Maria Alexandri; Eirini Alexandri
Rome 2022	Ukraine; Maryna Aleksiiva; Vladyslava Aleksiiva	Austria; Anna Maria Alexandri; Eirini Alexandri	Italy; Linda Cerruti; Costanza Ferro
Kraków 2023	Austria; Anna-Maria Alexandri; Eirini-Marina Alexandri	Ukraine; Maryna Aleksiyiva; Vladyslava Aleksiyiva	Great Britain; Kate Shortman; Isabelle Thorpe
Belgrade 2024	Netherlands; Bregje de Brouwer; Noortje de Brouwer	United Kingdom; Kate Shortman; Isabelle Thorpe	Israel; Ariel Nassee; Shelly Bobritsky

== Duet technical routine ==
Event	Gold	Silver	Bronze
London 2016	Russia; Natal'ja Iščenko; Svetlana Romašina	Ukraine; Lolita Ananasova; Anna Vološyna	Italy; Linda Cerruti; Costanza Ferro
Glasgow 2018	Russia; Svetlana Kolesničenko; Varvara Subbotina	Ukraine; Anastasija Savčuk; Yelyzaveta Yakhno	Italy; Linda Cerruti; Costanza Ferro
Budapest 2020	Russia; Svetlana Kolesničenko; Svetlana Romashina	Ukraine; Anastasija Savčuk; Marta Fiedina	Austria; Anna Maria Alexandri; Eirini Alexandri
Rome 2022	Ukraine; Maryna Aleksiiva; Vladyslava Aleksiiva	Austria; Anna Maria Alexandri; Eirini Alexandri	Italy; Linda Cerruti; Costanza Ferro
Krakow 2023	Austria; Anna-Maria Alexandri; Eirini-Marina Alexandri	Netherlands; Bregje de Brouwer; Marloes Steenbeek	Greece; Sofia Malkogeorgou; Evangelia Platanioti
Belgrade 2024	Netherlands; Bregje de Brouwer; Noortje de Brouwer	United Kingdom; Kate Shortman; Isabelle Thorpe	Israel; Ariel Nassee; Shelly Bobritsky

== Team free routine ==
Event	Gold	Silver	Bronze
Vienna 1974	Great Britain	West Germany	Netherlands
Jönköping 1977	Netherlands	Great Britain	Switzerland
Split 1981	Great Britain	Netherlands	Switzerland
Rome 1983	Great Britain	Netherlands	West Germany
Sofia 1985	France	Great Britain	Netherlands
Strasbourg 1987	France	Soviet Union	Switzerland
Bonn 1989	France	Soviet Union	Switzerland
Athens 1991	Soviet Union	France	Italy
Sheffield 1993	Russia	France	Italy
Vienna 1995	Russia	France	Italy
Siviglia 1997	Russia	France	Italy
Istanbul 1999	Russia	France	Italy
Helsinki 2000	Russia	Italy	France
Berlin 2002	Russia	Spain	Italy
Madrid 2004	Russia	Spain	Italy
Budapest 2006	Russia	Spain	Italy
Eindhoven 2008	Spain	Italy	Ukraine
Budapest 2010	Russia	Spain	Ukraine
Eindhoven 2012	Spain	Ukraine	Italy
Berlino 2014	Russia	Ukraine	Spain
London 2016	Russia	Ukraine	Italy
Glasgow 2018	Russia	Ukraine	Italy
Budapest 2020	Ukraine	Spain	Israel
Rome 2022	Ukraine	Italy	France
Krakow 2023	Spain	Italy	Israel
Belgrade 2024	Greece	Italy	United Kingdom

== Team technical routine ==
Event	Gold	Silver	Bronze
London 2016	Russia	Ukraine	Italy
Glasgow 2018	Russia	Ukraine	Italy
Budapest 2020	Russia	Ukraine	Spain
Rome 2022	Ukraine	Italy	France
Krakow 2023	Spain	Italy	France
Belgrade 2024	Spain	Greece	Italy

== Team Free Routine Combination ==
Event	Gold	Silver	Bronze
Madrid 2004	Spain	Italy	Greece
Budapest 2006	Russia	Spain	Italy
Eindhoven 2008	Spain	Italy	Ukraine
Budapest 2010	Russia	Spain	Ukraine
Eindhoven 2012	Spain	Ukraine	Italy
Berlino 2014	Ukraine	Spain	Italy
London 2016	Russia	Ukraine	Italy
Glasgow 2018	Ukraine	Italy	Spain
Budapest 2020	Ukraine	Greece	Belarus
Rome 2022	Ukraine	Italy	Greece
Krakow 2023	Israel	Germany	Turkey

== Team highlights routine ==
Event	Gold	Silver	Bronze
Budapest 2020	Ukraine	Belarus	Hungary
Rome 2022	Ukraine	Italy	France

== Team acrobatic routine ==
Event	Gold	Silver	Bronze
Krakow 2023	France	Ukraine	Italy
Belgrade 2024	Germany	Greece	Italy

== Mixed duet free routine ==
Event	Gold	Silver	Bronze
London 2016	Russia; Aleksandr Maltsev; Michaėla Kalanča	Italy; Giorgio Minisini; Mariangela Perrupato	Spain; Pau Ribes; Berta Ferreras
Glasgow 2018	Russia; Aleksandr Maltsev; Mayya Gurbanberdieva	Italy; Giorgio Minisini; Manila Flamini	Spain; Pau Ribes; Berta Ferreras
Budapest 2020	Russia; Aleksandr Maltsev; Olesia Platonova	Spain; Pau Ribes; Emma García	Italy; Nicolò Ogliari; Isotta Sportelli
Rome 2022	Italy; Giorgio Minisini; Lucrezia Ruggiero	Spain; Pau Ribes; Emma García	Slovakia; Jozef Solymosy; Silvia Solymosyová
Krakow 2023	Spain; Mireia Hernández; Dennis González	Italy; Giorgio Minisini; Lucrezia Ruggiero	Great Britain; Beatrice Crass; Ranjuo Tomblin
Belgrade 2024	Spain; Dennis González; Emma García	Italy; Filippo Pelati; Flaminia Vernice	United Kingdom; Ranjuo Tomblin; Beatrice Crass

== Mixed duet technical routine ==
Event	Gold	Silver	Bronze
London 2016	Russia; Aleksandr Maltsev; Michaėla Kalanča	Italy; Giorgio Minisini; Manila Flamini	Spain; Pau Ribes; Berta Ferreras
Glasgow 2018	Russia; Aleksandr Maltsev; Mayya Gurbanberdieva	Italy; Giorgio Minisini; Manila Flamini	Spain; Pau Ribes; Berta Ferreras
Budapest 2020	Russia; Aleksandr Maltsev; Mayya Gurbanberdieva	Spain; Pau Ribes; Emma García	Italy; Nicolò Ogliari; Isotta Sportelli
Rome 2022	Italy; Giorgio Minisini; Lucrezia Ruggiero	Spain; Pau Ribes; Emma García	Slovakia; Jozef Solymosy; Silvia Solymosyová
Krakow 2023	Italy; Giorgio Minisini; Lucrezia Ruggiero	Spain; Emma García; Dennis González	Great Britain; Beatrice Crass; Ranjuo Tomblin
Belgrade 2024	Spain; Dennis González; Mireia Hernández	Italy; Filippo Pelati; Sarah Maria Rizea	Great Britain; Ranjuo Tomblin; Beatrice Crass

== Men solo free routine ==
Event	Gold	Silver	Bronze
Rome 2022	Giorgio Minisini; Italy	Fernando Díaz del Río; Spain	Quentin Rakotomalala; France
Belgrade 2024	Ranjuo Tomblin; United Kingdom	Giorgio Minisini; Italy	Quentin Rakotomalala; France

== Men solo technical routine ==
Event	Gold	Silver	Bronze
Rome 2022	Giorgio Minisini; Italy	Fernando Díaz del Río; Spain	Ivan Martinović; Serbia
Belgrade 2024	Dennis González; Spain	Ranjuo Tomblin; United Kingdom	Giorgio Minisini; Italy

== See also ==
- European Aquatics Championships all-time medal table
