= Synchronized swimming at the 1984 Summer Olympics – Women's solo =

Women's solo at the Games of the XXIII Olympiad
- Venue: Uytengsu Aquatics Center
- Date: 8–12 August
- Competitors: 50 from 21 nations
- Winning points: 198.467

Medalists
1st place, gold medalist(s)		Tracie Ruiz	United States
2nd place, silver medalist(s)		Carolyn Waldo	Canada
3rd place, bronze medalist(s)		Miwako Motoyoshi	Japan

The women's solo was one of two events in the synchronized swimming program at the 1984 Summer Olympics. The final was held on August 12, 1984.

To qualify for the final, the swimmers had to compete in a figures competition. A total of eighteen swimmers qualified to compete in the solo competition.

== Results ==
=== Technical figures ===
Rank	Country	Athlete	Technical
1	United States	Tracie Ruiz	99.467
2	Canada	Carolyn Waldo	96.700
3	Canada	Sharon Hambrook	96.233
4	Canada	Kelly Kryczka	95.834
5	United States	Candy Costie	93.700
6	United States	Sarah Josephson	93.267
7	Great Britain	Carolyn Wilson	91.900
8	Japan	Saeko Kimura	91.733
9	Japan	Kazuno Fujiwara	91.566
10	Great Britain	Amanda Dodd	90.466
11	Japan	Miwako Motoyoshi	90.250
12	Netherlands	Marijke Engelen	89.232
13	West Germany	Gudrun Hänisch	87.817
14	Great Britain	Caroline Holmyard	87.400
15	France	Muriel Hermine	87.334
16	Switzerland	Karin Singer	87.183
17	Switzerland	Edith Boss	87.034
18	Mexico	Pilar Ramírez	85.434
19	Switzerland	Caroline Sturzenegger	85.184
20	Venezuela	Ana Amicarella	85.100
21	Mexico	Claudia Novelo	84.983
22	Netherlands	Catrien Eijken	84.883
23	Netherlands	Marjolein Philipsen	84.867
24	France	Pascale Besson	84.484
25	Austria	Alexandra Worisch	84.383
26	Brazil	Tessa Carvalho	84.284
27	West Germany	Christine Lang	83.966
28	France	Odile Petit	81.433
29	West Germany	Gerlind Scheller	81.317
30	Austria	Eva-Maria Edinger	81.150
31	Brazil	Paula Carvalho	79.900
32	Australia	Donella Burridge	79.883
33	Barbados	Chemene Sinson	79.584
34	Mexico	Lourdes Candini	79.550
35	New Zealand	Lynette Sadleir	79.500
36	Dominican Republic	Maribel Solis	79.434
37	New Zealand	Katie Sadleir	79.383
38	Italy	Antonella Terenzi	78.833
39	Australia	Lisa Steanes	78.500
40	Spain	Mónica Antich	77.867
41	Dominican Republic	Ximena Carias	76.199
42	Belgium	Katia Overfeldt	75.666
43	Belgium	Patricia Serneels	75.066
44	Egypt	Dahlia Mokbel	73.367
45	Egypt	Sahar Helal	70.049
46	Spain	Ana Tarrés	69.234
47	Spain	Rosa Costa	69.083
48	Egypt	Sahar Youssef	67.165
49	Netherlands Antilles	Esther Croes	66.067
50	Netherlands Antilles	Nicole Hoevertsz	64.900

=== Qualification ===
Rank	Country	Athlete	Technical	Free	Total
1	United States	Tracie Ruiz	99.467	98.20	197.667
2	Canada	Carolyn Waldo	96.700	97.80	194.500
3	Japan	Miwako Motoyoshi	90.250	95.60	185.850
4	Netherlands	Marijke Engelen	89.232	91.80	181.032
5	Great Britain	Caroline Holmyard	87.400	93.00	180.400
6	West Germany	Gudrun Hänisch	87.817	92.40	180.217
7	France	Muriel Hermine	87.334	92.20	179.534
8	Switzerland	Karin Singer	87.183	90.80	177.983
9	Venezuela	Ana Amicarella	85.100	88.60	173.700
10	Austria	Alexandra Worisch	84.383	89.00	173.383
11	Barbados	Chemene Sinson	79.584	87.60	167.184
12	Australia	Donella Burridge	79.883	86.40	166.283
13	Brazil	Paula Carvalho	79.900	85.80	165.700
14	Italy	Antonella Terenzi	78.833	86.20	165.033
15	Belgium	Patricia Serneels	75.066	85.60	160.666
16	Egypt	Dahlia Mokbel	73.367	82.40	155.767
17	Spain	Rosa Costa	69.083	80.80	149.883
—	Netherlands Antilles	Esther Croes	66.067	DNS	—

=== Final ===
Rank	Country	Athlete	Technical	Free	Total
Gold medal	United States	Tracie Ruiz	99.467	99.00	198.467
Silver medal	Canada	Carolyn Waldo	96.700	98.60	195.300
Bronze medal	Japan	Miwako Motoyoshi	90.250	96.80	187.050
4	Netherlands	Marijke Engelen	89.232	93.40	182.632
5	West Germany	Gudrun Hänisch	87.817	94.20	182.017
6	Great Britain	Caroline Holmyard	87.400	94.60	182.000
7	France	Muriel Hermine	87.334	93.20	180.534
8	Switzerland	Karin Singer	87.183	91.20	178.383
