= Synchronized swimming at the 1984 Summer Olympics – Women's duet =

Women's duet at the Games of the XXIII Olympiad
- Venue: Uytengsu Aquatics Center
- Date: 6–9 August
- Competitors: 36 from 18 nations
- Winning points: 195.584

Medalists
1st place, gold medalist(s)		Candy Costie; Tracie Ruiz	United States
2nd place, silver medalist(s)		Sharon Hambrook; Kelly Kryczka	Canada
3rd place, bronze medalist(s)		Saeko Kimura; Miwako Motoyoshi	Japan

The women's duet was one of two events in the synchronized swimming program at the 1984 Summer Olympics. The final was held on August 9.

== Results ==
=== Technical figures ===
Rank	Country	Athlete	Technical	Rank	Average
1	United States	Candy Costie	93.700	5	96.584
1	United States	Tracie Ruiz	99.467	1	96.584
2	Canada	Sharon Hambrook	96.233	3	96.034
2	Canada	Kelly Kryczka	95.834	4	96.034
3	Japan	Saeko Kimura	91.733	8	90.992
3	Japan	Miwako Motoyoshi	90.250	11	90.992
4	Great Britain	Caroline Holmyard	87.400	14	89.650
4	Great Britain	Carolyn Wilson	91.900	7	89.650
5	Switzerland	Edith Boss	87.034	17	87.109
5	Switzerland	Karin Singer	87.183	16	87.109
6	Netherlands	Catrien Eijken	84.883	22	87.058
6	Netherlands	Marijke Engelen	89.232	12	87.058
7	France	Pascale Besson	84.484	24	85.909
7	France	Muriel Hermine	87.334	15	85.909
8	Mexico	Claudia Novelo	84.983	21	85.209
8	Mexico	Pilar Ramírez	85.434	18	85.209
9	West Germany	Gudrun Hänisch	87.817	13	84.567
9	West Germany	Gerlind Scheller	81.317	29	84.567
10	Austria	Eva-Maria Edinger	81.150	30	82.767
10	Austria	Alexandra Worisch	84.383	25	82.767
11	Brazil	Paula Carvalho	79.900	31	82.092
11	Brazil	Tessa Carvalho	84.284	26	82.092
12	New Zealand	Katie Sadleir	79.383	37	79.442
12	New Zealand	Lynette Sadleir	79.500	35	79.442
13	Australia	Donella Burridge	79.883	32	79.192
13	Australia	Lisa Steanes	78.500	39	79.192
14	Dominican Republic	Ximena Carias	76.199	41	77.817
14	Dominican Republic	Maribel Solis	79.434	36	77.817
15	Belgium	Katia Overfeldt	75.666	42	75.366
15	Belgium	Patricia Serneels	75.066	43	75.366
16	Spain	Mónica Antich	77.867	40	73.551
16	Spain	Ana Tarrés	69.234	46	73.551
17	Egypt	Dahlia Mokbel	73.367	44	70.266
17	Egypt	Sahar Youssef	67.165	48	70.266
18	Netherlands Antilles	Esther Croes	66.067	49	65.484
18	Netherlands Antilles	Nicole Hoevertsz	64.900	50	65.484

=== Qualification ===
Rank	Country	Athlete	Technical	Free	Total
1	United States	Candy Costie & Tracie Ruiz	96.584	98.40	194.484
2	Canada	Sharon Hambrook & Kelly Kryczka	96.034	97.80	193.834
3	Japan	Saeko Kimura & Miwako Motoyoshi	90.992	96.80	187.792
4	Great Britain	Caroline Holmyard & Carolyn Wilson	89.650	92.60	182.250
5	Switzerland	Edith Boss & Karin Singer	87.109	91.40	178.509
6	Netherlands	Catrien Eijken & Marijke Engelen	87.058	91.00	178.058
7	France	Pascale Besson & Muriel Hermine	85.909	90.40	176.309
8	Mexico	Claudia Novelo & Pilar Ramírez	85.209	90.20	175.409
9	West Germany	Gudrun Hänisch & Gerlind Scheller	84.567	89.80	174.367
10	Austria	Eva-Maria Edinger & Alexandra Worisch	82.767	88.60	171.367
11	Brazil	Paula Carvalho & Tessa Carvalho	82.092	84.20	166.292
12	New Zealand	Katie Sadleir & Lynette Sadleir	79.442	85.20	164.642
13	Australia	Donella Burridge & Lisa Steanes	79.192	85.40	164.592
14	Dominican Republic	Ximena Carias & Maribel Solis	77.817	80.20	158.017
15	Belgium	Katia Overfeldt & Patricia Serneels	75.366	81.20	156.566
16	Spain	Mónica Antich & Ana Tarrés	73.551	80.60	154.151
17	Egypt	Dahlia Mokbel & Sahar Youssef	70.266	80.60	150.866
18	Netherlands Antilles	Esther Croes & Nicole Hoevertsz	65.484	76.40	141.884

=== Final ===
Rank	Country	Athlete	Technical	Free	Total
1st place, gold medalist(s)	United States	Candy Costie & Tracie Ruiz	96.584	99.00	195.584
2nd place, silver medalist(s)	Canada	Sharon Hambrook & Kelly Kryczka	96.034	98.20	194.234
3rd place, bronze medalist(s)	Japan	Saeko Kimura & Miwako Motoyoshi	90.992	97.00	187.992
4	Great Britain	Caroline Holmyard & Carolyn Wilson	89.650	94.40	184.050
5	Switzerland	Edith Boss & Karin Singer	87.109	93.00	180.109
6	Netherlands	Catrien Eijken & Marijke Engelen	87.058	92.00	179.058
7	France	Pascale Besson & Muriel Hermine	85.909	90.80	176.709
8	Mexico	Claudia Novelo & Pilar Ramírez	85.209	91.20	176.409
