= Tarrés (surname) =

Tarrés is a surname. Notable people with the surname include:

- Ana Tarrés (born 1967), Spanish synchronized swimmer
- Jordi Tarrés:
  - Jordi Tarrés (motorcycle trials rider) (born 1966), Spanish motorcycle trials rider in off-road competitions
  - Jordi Tarrés (footballer) (born 1981), Hong Kong footballer
- Pere Tarrés i Claret (1905–1950), Spanish doctor and Roman Catholic priest
