= 1981 European Aquatics Championships =

Water sport competitions

15th European Aquatics Championships
- Host city: (Socialist Federal Republic of Yugoslavia) Split, Yugoslavia
- Date: 5–12 September 1981
- Events: 37

The 1981 European Aquatics Championships were held in an indoor pool (50 m) in Split, Yugoslavia from 5 September to 12 September 1981. Besides swimming there were titles contested in diving, synchronized swimming (women) and water polo (men).

== Medal table ==
* Host nation (Yugoslavia)

Rank	Nation	Gold	Silver	Bronze	Total
1	East Germany	15	11	3	29
2	Soviet Union	13	11	8	32
3	Great Britain	3	2	3	8
4	West Germany	2	2	4	8
5	Hungary	2	0	1	3
6	Sweden	1	4	2	7
7	Yugoslavia*	1	1	1	3
8	Netherlands	0	3	4	7
9	Poland	0	1	3	4
10	Austria	0	1	2	3
11	Italy	0	1	1	2
12	Czechoslovakia	0	0	1	1
12	France	0	0	1	1
12	Romania	0	0	1	1
12	Spain	0	0	1	1
12	Switzerland	0	0	1	1
Totals (16 entries)		37	37	37	111

== Swimming ==
=== Men's events ===
Event	Gold	Silver	Bronze
100 m freestyle	Per Johansson (SWE)	Jörg Woithe (GDR)	Sergey Krasyuk (URS)
200 m freestyle	Sergey Kopliakov (URS)	Michael Söderlund (SWE)	Thomas Lejdström (SWE)
400 m freestyle	Borut Petrič (YUG)	Vladimir Salnikov (URS)	Darjan Petrič (YUG)
1500 m freestyle	Vladimir Salnikov (URS)	Borut Petrič (YUG)	Rafael Escalas (ESP)
100 m backstroke	Sándor Wladár (HUN)	Vladimir Shemetov (URS)	Viktor Kuznetsov (URS)
200 m backstroke	Sándor Wladár (HUN)	Vladimir Shemetov (URS)	Frédéric Delcourt (FRA)
100 m breaststroke	Yuriy Kis (URS)	Arsens Miskarovs (URS)	Gerald Mörken (FRG)
200 m breaststroke	Robertas Žulpa (URS)	Arsens Miskarovs (URS)	Adrian Moorhouse (GBR)
100 m butterfly	Aleksey Markovsky (URS)	Pär Arvidsson (SWE)	Vadim Dombrovskiy (URS)
200 m butterfly	Michael Groß (FRG)	Phil Hubble (GBR)	Sergey Fesenko (URS)
200 m individual medley	Aleksandr Sidorenko (URS)	Giovanni Franceschi (ITA)	Josef Hladký (TCH)
400 m individual medley	Sergey Fesenko (URS)	Leszek Górski (POL)	Giovanni Franceschi (ITA)
4 × 100 m freestyle relay	Soviet Union; Vladimir Shemetov; Vladimir Salnikov; Aleksandr Chaev; Sergey Kopliakov	Sweden; Per Holmertz; Per Wikström; Lasse Lindqvist; Per Johansson	West Germany; Peter Knust; Wilfried Kuhlem; Michael Groß; Andreas Schmidt
4 × 200 m freestyle relay	Soviet Union; Vladimir Shemetov; Vladimir Salnikov; Aleksandr Chaev; Sergey Kopliakov	West Germany; Michael Groß; Gerald Schlupp; Andreas Schmidt; Frank Wennmann	Sweden; Michael Söderlund; Per Wikström; Per-Alvar Magnusson; Thomas Lejdström
4 × 100 m medley relay	Soviet Union; Viktor Kuznetsov; Yuriy Kis; Aleksey Markovsky; Sergey Krasyuk	Sweden; Bengt Baron; Glen Christiansen; Pär Arvidsson; Per Johansson	East Germany; Dirk Richter; Sigurd Hanke; Olaf Ziesche; Jörg Woithe

=== Women's events ===
Event	Gold	Silver	Bronze
100 m freestyle	Caren Metschuck (GDR)	Birgit Meineke (GDR)	Conny van Bentum (NED)
200 m freestyle	Carmela Schmidt (GDR)	Birgit Meineke (GDR)	Conny van Bentum (NED)
400 m freestyle	Ines Diers (GDR)	Carmela Schmidt (GDR)	Jackie Wilmott (GBR)
800 m freestyle	Carmela Schmidt (GDR)	Ines Diers (GDR)	Jackie Wilmott (GBR)
100 m backstroke	Ina Kleber (GDR)	Cornelia Polit (GDR)	Carmen Bunaciu (ROU)
200 m backstroke	Cornelia Polit (GDR)	Jolanda de Rover (NED)	Larisa Gorchakova (URS)
100 m breaststroke	Ute Geweniger (GDR)	Suki Brownsdon (GBR)	Larisa Belokon (URS)
200 m breaststroke	Ute Geweniger (GDR)	Larisa Belokon (URS)	Grażyna Dziedzic (POL)
100 m butterfly	Ute Geweniger (GDR)	Ines Geißler (GDR)	Karin Seick (FRG)
200 m butterfly	Ines Geißler (GDR)	Heike Dähne (GDR)	Agnieszka Czopek (POL)
200 m individual medley	Ute Geweniger (GDR)	Petra Schneider (GDR)	Olga Klevakina (URS)
400 m individual medley	Petra Schneider (GDR)	Ute Geweniger (GDR)	Agnieszka Czopek (POL)
4 × 100 m freestyle relay	East Germany; Birgit Meineke; Caren Metschuck; Ines Diers; Susanne Link	West Germany; Marion Aizpors; Karin Seick; Ute Neubert; Susanne Schuster	Netherlands; Annemarie Verstappen; Monique Drost; Wilma van Velsen; Conny van Bentum
4 × 100 m medley relay	East Germany; Ina Kleber; Ute Geweniger; Ines Geißler; Caren Metschuck	Soviet Union; Larisa Gorchakova; Larisa Belokon; Natalia Pokas; Natalya Strunnikova	West Germany; Ute Neubert; Andrea Schönborn; Karin Seick; Marion Aizpors

== Diving ==
=== Men's events ===
Event	Gold	Silver	Bronze
3 m springboard	Aleksandr Portnov (URS)	Sergei Kuzmin (URS)	Niki Stajković (AUT)
10 m platform	David Ambartsumyan (URS)	Vladimir Aleynik (URS)	Dieter Waskow (GDR)

=== Women's events ===
Event	Gold	Silver	Bronze
3 m springboard	Zhanna Tsirulnikova (URS)	Martina Jäschke (GDR)	Irina Kalinina (URS)
10 m platform	Katarina Zipperling (GDR)	Tatyana Belyakova (URS)	Martina Jäschke (GDR)

== Synchronized swimming ==
Event	Gold	Silver	Bronze
Solo	Carolyn Wilson (GBR)	Alexandra Worisch (AUT)	Marijke Engelen (NED)
Duet	Caroline Holmyard (GBR); Carolyn Wilson (GBR)	Catrien Eijken (NED); Marijke Engelen (NED)	Eva-Maria Edinger (AUT); Alexandra Worisch (AUT)
Team competition	Great Britain (GBR); Tracy Cook; Louise Corkhilld; Amanda Dodd; Deborah Golding; Caroline Holmyard; Sheila Kenton; Philippa Sutton; Carolyn Wilson	Netherlands (NED); Catrien Eijken; Marijke Engelen; Marleen Engelen; Petri Engels; Judith van de Berg; Maria van den Broek; Liesbeth van Hoorn; Ilse Westbroe	Switzerland (SUI); Cornelia Blank; Edith Boss; Ines Gerber; Silvia Grossenbacher; Maya Mast; Irene Singer; Karin Singer; Caroline Sturzenegger

== Water polo ==
Event	Gold	Silver	Bronze
Team competition	West Germany	Soviet Union	Hungary
