= Larisa Belokon =

Soviet swimmer (born 1964)

Personal information
- Born: 18 May 1964 (age 62) Tashkent, Uzbek SSR, Soviet Union

Sport
- Sport: Swimming
Medal record
Women's swimming
Representing the Soviet Union
European Championships
Silver medal – second place	1981 Split	200 m breaststroke
Silver medal – second place	1981 Split	4×100 m medley
Bronze medal – third place	1981 Split	100 m breaststroke
Universiade
Gold medal – first place	1983 Edmonton	100 m breaststroke
Gold medal – first place	1983 Edmonton	200 m breaststroke
Gold medal – first place	1983 Edmonton	4×100 m medley

Larisa Yuryevna Belokon (Russian: Лариса Юрьевна Белоконь; born 18 May 1964) is a Soviet breaststroke swimmer who mostly competed in the 100 m and 200 m breastroke and 4 × 100 m medley relay. In these events she won a bronze and two silver medals at the 1981 European Aquatics Championships and three gold medals at the 1983 Summer Universiade. She missed the 1984 Summer Olympics due to the boycott by the Soviet Union and took part in the Friendship Games instead, winning three medals in the same three events.

Since 2009 Belokon has been living in the Moscow Oblast, in the early 2010s she competed in swimming in the masters category. After marriage she changed her last name to Pashkanova (Russian: Пашканова).
