= Vadim Dombrovskiy =

Soviet swimmer (born 1958)

Personal information
- Born: 21 May 1958 (age 68) Kyiv, Ukraine

Sport
- Sport: Swimming
- Club: Dynamo Kyiv (1974-1982)
Medal record
Representing Soviet Union
European Championships
Bronze medal – third place	1981 Split	100 m butterfly

Vadim Aleksandrovich Dombrovskiy (Russian: Вадим Александрович Домбровский; born 21 May 1958) is a Soviet swimmer who won a bronze medal in the 100 m butterfly at the 1981 European Aquatics Championships. In 1980, he set a European record in the same event. During his career he won four national titles, in the 100 m butterfly (1975, 1980, 1981) and 4 × 100 m medley (1982).
