= Ingrid Scheffer =

Australian paediatric neurologist and senior research (born 1958)

Professor Ingrid Scheffer AO FRS FAA FAHMS
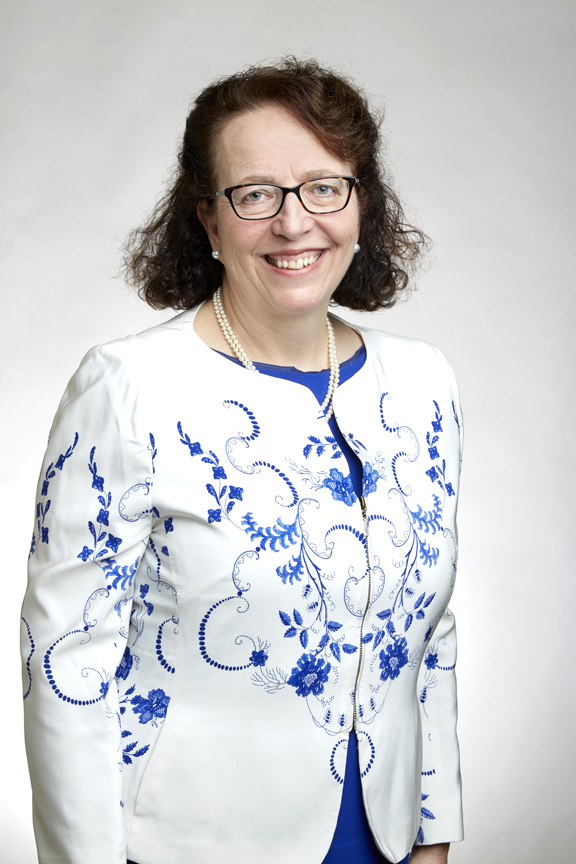
- Ingrid Scheffer at the Royal Society admissions day in London, July 2018
- Born: Ingrid Eileen Scheffer; Melbourne, Australia
- Education: Methodist Ladies' College, Melbourne
- Alma mater: University of Melbourne (PhD)
- Awards: Prime Minister's Prizes for Science (2014); L'Oréal-UNESCO For Women in Science Award (2012)
- Scientific career
- Fields: Epilepsy; Neurology
- Workplaces: Florey Institute of Neuroscience and Mental Health
- Thesis: Inherited epilepsy syndromes in multiplex families (1988)
- Website: ingridscheffer.com

Ingrid Eileen Scheffer is an Australian paediatric neurologist and senior research fellow at the Florey Institute of Neuroscience and Mental Health. Scheffer has made several major advances in the field of epilepsy research. Scheffer is credited with finding the first gene implicated in epilepsy. She has also described and classified novel epileptic syndromes such as Epilepsy limited to Females with cognitive disability.

== Early life and education ==
Ingrid Eileen Scheffer was born in Melbourne, Victoria on 21 December 1958. Scheffer finished secondary school at Methodist Ladies' College in 1976, and then attended Monash University, where she graduated with a Bachelor of Medicine and a Bachelor of Surgery (MBBS) in 1983. Scheffer went on to complete her PhD in neurology at the University of Melbourne in 1998. Scheffer undertook her general paediatric neurology training at the Royal Children’s Hospital before moving to the UK to train in child neurology at the Great Ormond Street Hospital, London, and epileptology at the Austin Hospital.

== Career and research ==
Beyond further describing the aetiology of epilepsy, Ingrid has worked to characterise new epilepsy syndromes, from infancy to adulthood, which have permitted appropriate treatment and diagnosis, such as Dravet Syndrome and Epilepsy limited to Females with cognitive disability. Her work also provides for more accurate genetic reproductive counselling.

In 2014, Scheffer, alongside her close collaborator Professor Sam Berkovic, AC, won the Prime Minister’s Prize for Science for their work on deciphering the genetics of epilepsy. It is one of many awards in she has received throughout her career.

== Awards and honours ==
- American Epilepsy Society Research Recognition Award (2007)
- RACP Eric Susman Prize (2009)
- GSK Award for Research Excellence (2013)
- ILAE Ambassador for Epilepsy Award (2013)
- Australian Neuroscience Medallion (2013)
- Emil Becker Prize for child neurology (2013)
- L'Oréal-UNESCO Awards for Women in Science (2012)
- Prime Minister's Prize for Science (2014)
- Order of Australia (2014)
- Elected Fellow of the Australian Academy of Health and Medical Sciences
- Elected a Fellow of the Royal Society (FRS) in 2018
