= Rosa Costa =

Spanish synchronized swimmer

Personal information
- Full name: Rosa Costa Soler
- Nationality: Spain
- Born: 25 December 1964 (age 61) Palma de Mallorca, Spain
- Height: 1.70 m (5 ft 7 in)
- Weight: 65 kg (143 lb)

Sport
- Sport: Swimming
- Strokes: Synchronized swimming
- Updated on 16 November 2014

Rosa Costa (born 25 December 1964) is a former synchronized swimmer from Spain. She competed in the women's solo competition at the 1984 Summer Olympics.
