= Chemene Sinson =

Barbadian synchronized swimmer (born 1964)

Personal information
- Nationality: Barbados
- Born: 10 March 1964 (age 62)
- Height: 1.62 m (5 ft 4 in)
- Weight: 52 kg (115 lb)

Sport
- Sport: Swimming
- Strokes: Synchronized swimming
- Updated on 16 November 2014

Chemene Sinson (born 10 March 1964) is a former synchronized swimmer from Barbados. She competed in the women's solo competition at the 1984 Summer Olympics.
