= Donella Burridge =

Australian synchronised swimmer

Personal information
- Full name: Donella May Burridge
- Nationality: Australia
- Born: 31 May 1958 (age 68)
- Height: 1.57 m (5 ft 2 in)
- Weight: 56 kg (123 lb)

Sport
- Sport: Swimming
- Strokes: Synchronised swimming
- Updated on 16 November 2014

Donella Burridge (born 31 May 1958) is a former synchronised swimmer from Australia. She competed in both the women's solo and women's duet competitions at the 1984 Summer Olympics .
