= Lynette Sadleir =

Canadian synchronized swimmer and paediatric neurologist

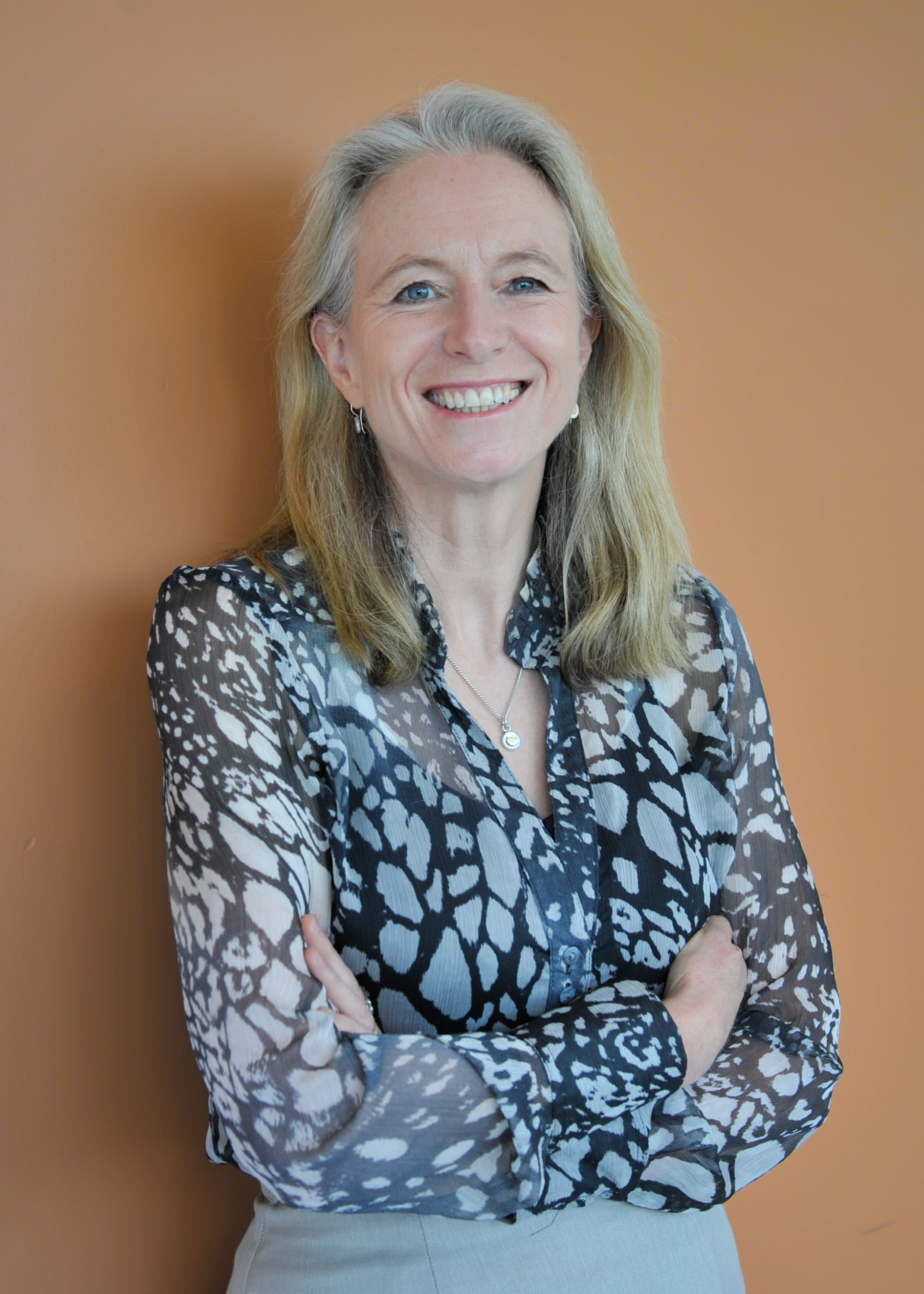
- Sadleir in 2024

Personal information
- Full name: Lynette Grant Sadleir
- Nationality: New Zealander
- Born: 1 August 1963 (age 62) Vancouver, British Columbia, Canada
- Scientific career
- Education: University of Otago
- Relatives: Katie Sadleir (sister)
- Fields: Neurology
- Institutions: University of Otago, Wellington
- Thesis: The electro-clinical features of typical absence seizures in untreated children (2004)

Sport
- Sport: Swimming
- Strokes: Synchronized swimming

Lynette Grant Sadleir (born 1 August 1963) is a New Zealand paediatric neurologist and epileptologist, and a former synchronised swimmer and coach.

== Biography ==
Born on 1 August 1963 in Vancouver, British Columbia, Canada, Sadleir competed for New Zealand in synchronised swimming at the 1984 Summer Olympics in Los Angeles. With her sister Katie Sadleir, she finished 12th in the women's duet.

After retiring from competition, Sadleir was the synchronised swimming coach for the New Zealand teams at three Commonwealth Games: in 1986, 1990 and 1994.

== Academic career ==
Sadleir completed her medical degree at the University of Otago and also earned a Diploma in Paediatrics from the University of Auckland. Sadleir completed postdoctoral work at British Columbia Children's Hospital, then joined the faculty of Otago. Sadleir is a paediatric neurologist and epileptologist, and was promoted to full professor in the Department of Paediatrics and Child Health at University of Otago, Wellington on 1 February 2019. Sadleir's research focus is the genetics of families with paediatric epilepsy.

== Selected works ==
- Gemma L Carvill; Sinéad B Heavin; Simone C Yendle; et al. (26 May 2013). "Targeted resequencing in epileptic encephalopathies identifies de novo mutations in CHD2 and SYNGAP1". Nature Genetics. 45 (7): 825–830. doi:10.1038/NG.2646. ISSN 1061-4036. PMC 3704157. PMID 23708187. Wikidata Q24602558.
- Louise A Harkin; Jacinta M McMahon; Xenia Iona; et al. (1 March 2007). "The spectrum of SCN1A-related infantile epileptic encephalopathies". Brain. 130 (Pt 3): 843–852. doi:10.1093/BRAIN/AWM002. ISSN 0006-8950. PMID 17347258. Wikidata Q48249670.
- Gemma L Carvill; Brigid M Regan; Simone C Yendle; et al. (11 August 2013). "GRIN2A mutations cause epilepsy-aphasia spectrum disorders". Nature Genetics. 45 (9): 1073–1076. doi:10.1038/NG.2727. ISSN 1061-4036. PMC 3868952. PMID 23933818. Wikidata Q37405551.
- Fadi F Hamdan; Candace T Myers; Patrick Cossette; et al. (1 November 2017). "High Rate of Recurrent De Novo Mutations in Developmental and Epileptic Encephalopathies". American Journal of Human Genetics. 101 (5): 664–685. doi:10.1016/J.AJHG.2017.09.008. ISSN 0002-9297. PMC 5673604. PMID 29100083. Wikidata Q47581915.
- Lynette G Sadleir; Ingrid E Scheffer (1 February 2007). "Febrile seizures". The BMJ. 334 (7588): 307–311. doi:10.1136/BMJ.39087.691817.AE. ISSN 0959-8138. PMC 1796669. PMID 17289734. Wikidata Q30478969.
- "De novo mutations in synaptic transmission genes including DNM1 cause epileptic encephalopathies". American Journal of Human Genetics. 95 (4): 360–70. 2 October 2014. doi:10.1016/J.AJHG.2014.08.013. ISSN 0002-9297. PMC 4185114. PMID 25262651. Wikidata Q24563008.
- Sadleir LG; Farrell K; Smith S; Mary B Connolly; Ingrid Scheffer (1 August 2006). "Electroclinical features of absence seizures in childhood absence epilepsy". Neurology. 67 (3): 413–418. doi:10.1212/01.WNL.0000228257.60184.82. ISSN 1526-632X. PMID 16894100. Wikidata Q80071396.
