= Sahar Youssef =

Egyptian synchronized swimmer

Personal information
- Nationality: Egypt
- Born: 1 December 1968 (age 57)

Sport
- Sport: Swimming
- Strokes: Synchronized swimming
- Updated on 17 November 2014

Sahar Youssef (born 1 December 1968) is a former synchronized swimmer from Egypt. She competed in the women's solo and women's duet at the 1984 Summer Olympics.
