= Tessa Carvalho =

Brazilian synchronized swimmer

Personal information
- Full name: Teresa Carvalho
- Nationality: Brazil
- Born: 13 December 1966 (age 59)

Sport
- Sport: Swimming
- Strokes: Synchronized swimming
- Updated on 16 November 2014

Tessa Carvalho (born 13 December 1966) is a former synchronized swimmer from Brazil. She competed in both the women's solo and women's duet competitions at the 1984 Summer Olympics.

Tessa's sister is Paula Carvalho, who was her partner in the women's duet at the 1984 Summer Olympics.
