= Ximena Carias =

Dominican Republic synchronized swimmer (born 1965)

Personal information
- Nationality: Dominican Republic
- Born: May 7, 1965 (age 61) Santo Domingo, Dominican Republic

Sport
- Sport: Swimming
- Strokes: Synchronized swimming

Ximena Carias (born May 7, 1965) is a former synchronized swimmer from the Dominican Republic. She competed in both the women's solo and the women's duet competitions at the 1984 Summer Olympics.

She also competed in the women's duet competition at the Seoul 1988 Summer Olympics, after which she effectively retired. She continued to judge various Pan Am games in her retirement.
