= Maribel Solis =

Dominican Republic synchronised swimmer

Personal information
- Nationality: Dominican Republic

Sport
- Sport: Swimming
- Strokes: Synchronized swimming
- Updated on 16 November 2014

Maribel Solis (date of birth unknown) is a former synchronized swimmer from the Dominican Republic. She competed in both the women's solo and the women's duet competitions at the 1984 Summer Olympics.
