= Synchronized swimming at the 1984 Summer Olympics =

Synchronized swimming at the Games of the XXIII Olympiad
- Venue: Uytengsu Aquatics Center
- Dates: August 6–12, 1984
- Competitors: 50 from 21 nations

Synchronized swimming was introduced to the Olympic Games at the 1984 Summer Olympics in Los Angeles, with two events, both for women only. Former competitive swimmer and MGM film star Esther Williams served as commentator. The events were contested at the McDonald's Olympic Swim Stadium.

== Participating nations ==
- Australia (2)
- Austria (2)
- Barbados (1)
- Belgium (2)
- Brazil (2)
- Canada (3)
- Dominican Republic (2)
- Egypt (3)
- France (3)
- Great Britain (3)
- Italy (1)
- Japan (3)
- Mexico (3)
- Netherlands (3)
- Netherlands Antilles (2)
- New Zealand (2)
- Spain (3)
- Switzerland (3)
- United States (3)
- Venezuela (1)
- West Germany (3)

== Competition schedule ==
Day	Date	Event	Phase
Day 10	Monday 6 August 1984	Duet	Musical Routine - Preliminary
Day 12	Wednesday 8 August 1984	Solo	Technical figures
Day 13	Thursday 9 August 1984	Duet	Musical Routine - Final
Day 14	Friday 10 August 1984	Solo	Musical Routine - Preliminary
Day 16	Sunday 12 August 1984	Solo	Musical Routine - Final

== Medal summary ==
=== Medal table ===
* Host nation (United States)

Rank	Nation	Gold	Silver	Bronze	Total
1	United States*	2	0	0	2
2	Canada	0	2	0	2
3	Japan	0	0	2	2
Totals (3 entries)		2	2	2	6

=== Medalists ===
Event	Gold	Silver	Bronze
Solo	Tracie Ruiz (USA)	Carolyn Waldo (CAN)	Miwako Motoyoshi (JPN)
Duet	United States; Candy Costie; Tracie Ruiz	Canada; Sharon Hambrook; Kelly Kryczka	Japan; Saeko Kimura; Miwako Motoyoshi
