= Malin Gerdin =

Swedish synchronized swimmer

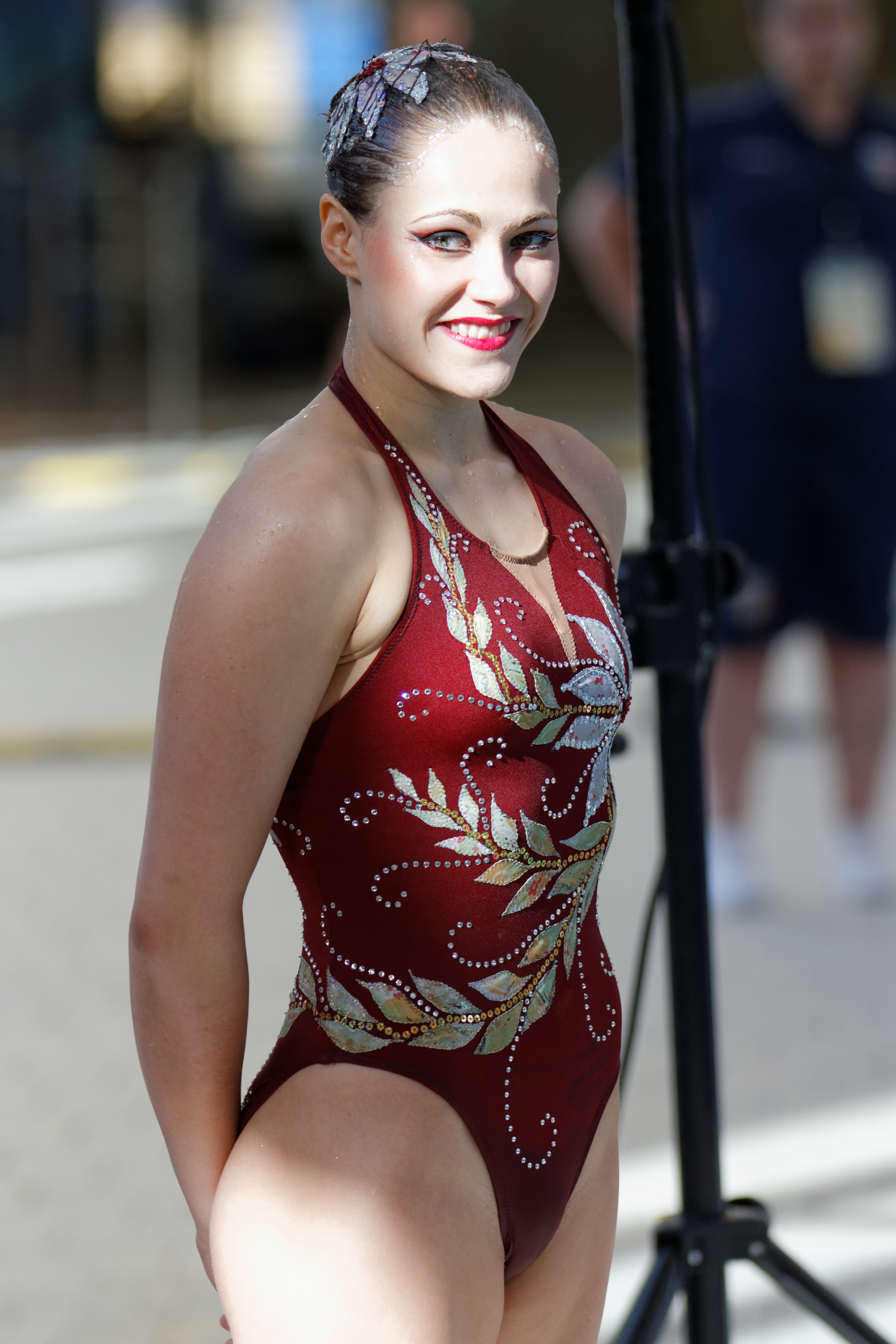
- Malin Gerdin at the 2013 French Open

Personal information
- Born: 12 March 1993 (age 33)
- Height: 163 cm (5 ft 4 in)
- Weight: 48 kg (106 lb)

Sport
- Country: Sweden
- Sport: Synchronized swimming
- Event(s): Solo, Duet

Malin Gerdin (born 12 March 1993) is a Swedish synchronized swimmer. She won the Swedish "synchronized swimmer of the year" award four times.

== Career records ==
Solo
2011, Junior European Championships, Belgrade, 11th
2012, European Championships, Debrecen, 13th
2013, World Championships, Barcelona, 22nd

Duet
2012, Summer Olympics Qualification Event, London, 30th
