= Alexandra Worisch =

Austrian synchronized swimmer

Personal information
- Nationality: Austria
- Born: 29 September 1965 (age 60)
- Height: 1.64 m (5 ft 5 in)
- Weight: 52 kg (115 lb)

Sport
- Sport: Swimming
- Strokes: Synchronized swimming
Medal record
Representing Austria
Synchronized swimming
European Aquatics Championships
Gold medal – first place	1985 Sofia	Women's duet
Silver medal – second place	1981 Split	Women's solo
Silver medal – second place	1987 Strasbourg	Women's solo
Bronze medal – third place	1981 Split	Women's duet
Bronze medal – third place	1985 Sofia	Women's solo
- Updated on 18 November 2014

Alexandra "Xandi" Worisch (born 29 September 1965 in Vienna) is a former synchronized swimmer from Austria. Worisch first competed internationally at the 3rd FINA World Championships 1978 held in what was then West Berlin, Germany. At the 1981 European Aquatics Championships, which took place in Split, Croatia (then Yugoslavia), Worisch won a silver medal in the women's solo event and a bronze in the duet. Worisch's participation in the 1981 Championships was made famous in celebrated photograph by Tony Duffy, of the Allsport photo agency.

Worisch went on to compete at the 1984 Summer Olympics, placing 10th in the women's solo competition and 10th in the women's duet competition with Eva-Maria Edinger.

Worisch was born to a family of Olympians; her mother, Eva Pfarrhofer, was an Olympic diver, as was her father Franz Worisch and her brother Michael Worisch. Xandi's niece, Nadine Brandl, also went on to compete in synchronized swimming for Austria at the 2008 and 2012 Olympic Games.
