= Katie Sadleir =

New Zealand synchronized swimmer

Katie Sadleir CNZM
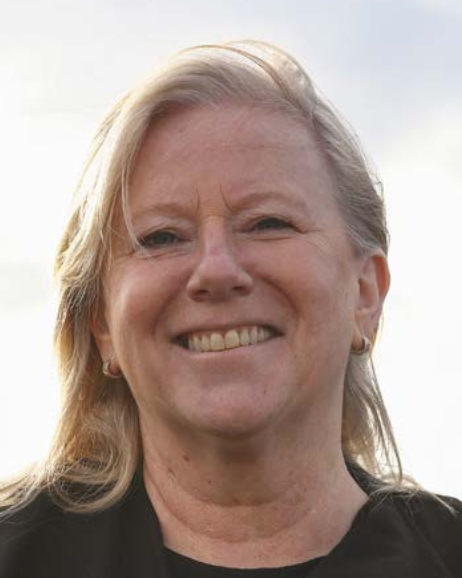
- Sadleir in 2022

Personal information
- Full name: Catherine Ann Grant Sadleir
- Nationality: New Zealander
- Born: 14 August 1964 (age 62) Torphins, Scotland
- Relatives: Lynette Sadleir (sister)

Sport
- Sport: Swimming
- Strokes: Synchronised swimming
Medal record
Women's synchronised swimming
Representing New Zealand
Commonwealth Games
Bronze medal – third place	1986 Edinburgh	Solo

Catherine Anne Grant Sadleir CNZM (born 14 August 1964) is a New Zealand sports executive and former synchronised swimmer.

== Biography ==
Sadleir was born in Torphins, Scotland, to Australian and Scottish parents. The family emigrated to Canada, then, when she was 16, moved to New Zealand and settled in Lower Hutt.

Sadleir first participated in synchronised swimming when she was living in Canada, aged 8, and represented the country in the sport. She later competed for New Zealand at the 1984 Summer Olympics in Los Angeles with her sister Lynette Sadleir. In the women's solo, Sadleir finished 37th and in the women's duet, Katie and Lynette finished 12th. At the 1986 Commonwealth Games in Edinburgh, Sadleir won the bronze medal in the women's solo.

Sadleir has been involved a range of governance and leadership roles in sport: she was appointed to the New Zealand Swimming Federation board while in her 20s, and also served on the New Zealand Olympic Committee Athletes Commission, was general manager of Sport New Zealand and led the establishment of the New Zealand Academy of Sport. She was the Assistant Chef de Mission for the New Zealand team at the 1994 Commonwealth Games in Victoria. She was the general manager of women's rugby for World Rugby from 2016 to August 2021, when she was appointed chief executive officer of the Commonwealth Games Federation. Sadleir is the first woman to hold the position.

In the 2024 King's Birthday Honours, Sadleir was appointed a Companion of the New Zealand Order of Merit, for services to sports governance and women.

Sadleir has completed a master's degree on swimming at Victoria University of Wellington.

Sadleir was chief executive when the Australian state of Victoria withdrew as host of the 2026 Commonwealth Games in 2023, citing rising costs, a decision that took Commonwealth Sport's leadership by surprise. Glasgow stepped in as replacement host, running a reduced programme of ten sports at a cost of about £160 million, compared with £700–800 million for the Birmingham 2022 and Gold Coast 2018 Games. Sadleir told BBC Sport: "I don't think we have ever been stronger... We took a hard look at ourselves and realised we needed to reset and reimagine this Games so it is an attractive proposition for our members."

In November 2025, Commonwealth Sport's general assembly confirmed Ahmedabad, India, as host of the centenary 2030 Commonwealth Games, after its executive board had recommended the city over a rival bid from Nigeria the previous month. Sadleir said: "Today's recommendation is strategically important for the future of the Commonwealth Sport movement. It builds on the platform that Glasgow 2026 will provide and sets a clear direction for the years ahead." The number of sports at the 2030 Games is expected to rise to between 15 and 18.

=== Publications ===
- Sadleir, Kaite (1999). "Managing elite sport". In Trenberth, Linda D.; Collins, Chris (eds.). Sport business management in New Zealand. Palmerston North: Dunmore.
