= Christine Lang =

German microbiologist and entrepreneur

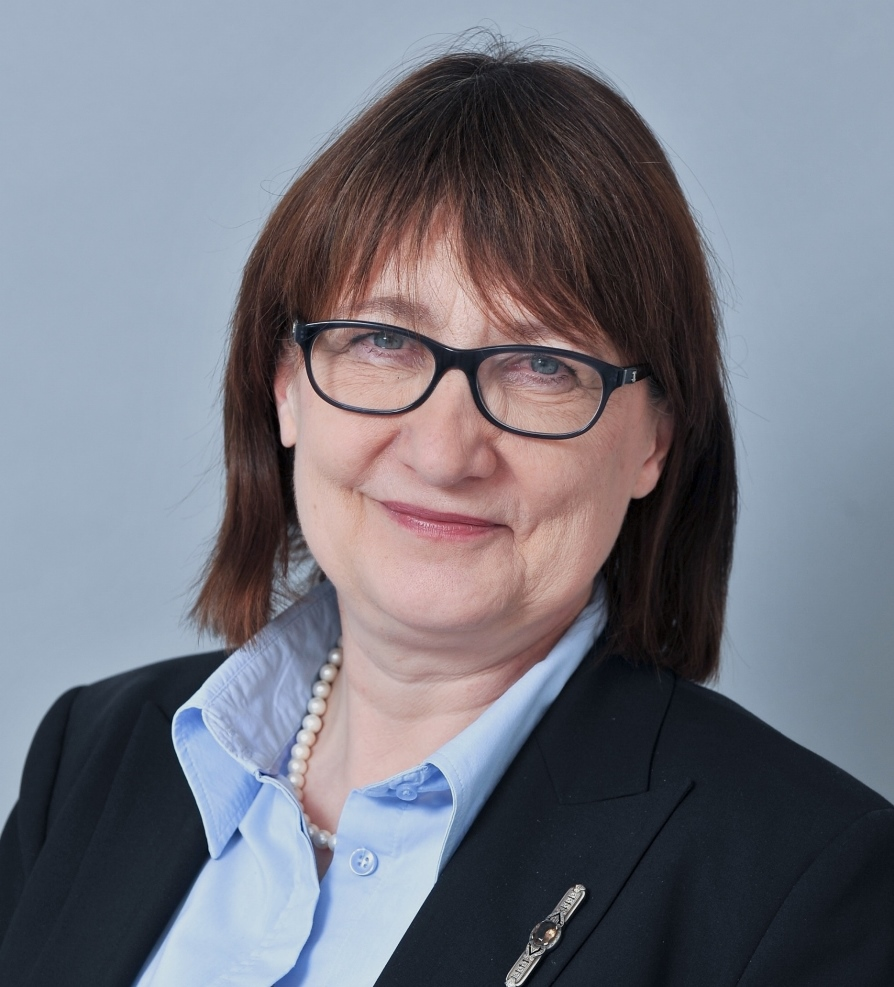
- Christine Lang (2015)
- Born: December 23, 1957 (age 68); Bochum, West Germany
- Education: Ruhr University Bochum, Technische Universität Berlin
- Occupations: Entrepreneur, adjunct professor of microbiology and molecular genetics

Christine Lang (born 23 December 1957, in Bochum, West Germany) is a German microbiologist and entrepreneur. She is an adjunct professor of microbiology and molecular genetics and teaches genetics in biotechnology at Technische Universität Berlin.

== Life and work ==
Lang was raised in Bochum, West Germany, with four brothers. She studied biology from 1976 to 1981 at the Ruhr University Bochum and the University of Sussex. In 1985, she obtained a Dr. rer. nat. in biology in Bochum on the molecular genetics of fungi, with her thesis entitled "Extrachromosomal in vitro genetics in fungi: chondriome vectors in yeasts." She then worked in industrial research at the Hüls Chemie research center (now Marl Chemical Plant). In 1993 she moved to the Technische Universität Berlin and habilitated in the field of microbiology and molecular genetics under the supervision of Ulf Stahl. At the TU Berlin she is an adjunct professor of microbiology and molecular genetics and teaches genetics in biotechnology.

In 2001 Lang and Ulf Stahl founded Organobalance GmbH, a company specializing in microbial strain development, which has been part of the Danish Novozymes A / S since September 2016. As of July 1, 2018, Lang gave up her long-term position as managing director of Organobalance Novozymes Berlin. Since December 2023, Novozymes has been renamed Novonesis following a merger.

In 2010, together with Bernd Wegener, she founded Organobalance Medical AG, now Belano Medical AG. In 2019, she was appointed to the Management Board with the responsibility for research and development. The company has been cooperating with Henkel Germany and the Müller retail store since 2021. Belano Medical AG filed for insolvency in mid-November 2023. The product line and brands will be continued by Rigix GmbH, based in Ronnenberg near Hanover.

In 2024, Christine Lang established the Biobased Future Foundation (Stiftung Biobasierte Zukunft) to encourage and support researchers and young scientists in their work on biobased processes.

== Research focus ==
Based on her microbiological research, Christine Lang focused primarily on the positive effects of yeasts and bacteria. Under her leadership, several studies were conducted which, among other things, demonstrated the preventive effect of lactic acid bacteria against tooth decay. In cooperation with BASF, starting in 2007, raw materials for toothpaste and mouthwash were developed from the bacterial strains.

Another focus of her research was the bio-based prevention and treatment of Helicobacter infections, which are suspected of causing stomach cancer, among other things. In research initiated by Lang and carried out in her companies, a strain of lactic acid bacteria was identified based on the principle of specific co-aggregation that binds the Helicobacter germ in the body and renders it harmless: Lactobacillus reuteri DSM17648. The resulting active ingredient Pylopass and its production are protected by several patents and were initially distributed by the Swiss supplier Lonza and later by Organobalance itself. The active ingredient is contained in other products for use in Helicobacter infections.

In her research, Lang is also committed to the further development of sustainable biotechnology. This so-called white biotechnology is intended to make optimal use of limited resources and protect nature and the environment. She investigated the extent to which yeasts or fungi can be used as an alternative to fossil raw materials. Studies have subsequently shown that, for example, the active ingredient squalene, which is important for skin care and medical applications, does not have to be extracted from shark liver as previously, but can be produced using yeast. Succinic acid can also be produced from renewable resources using baker's yeast and used as a natural starting material for plastics. This eliminates the high temperatures required for conventional chemical synthesis, with their correspondingly high energy consumption and environmentally harmful solvents.

== Awards and honors (selection) ==
- Darboven IDEE Award (2nd place), 2003
- Berlin Entrepreneur of the Year (2nd place), 2008
- Journal of Dental Research Cover of the Year Award (1st place for innovative work and best photo), 2011
- Nomination for the Innovation Prize of the German Economy, 2016

== Boards and memberships ==
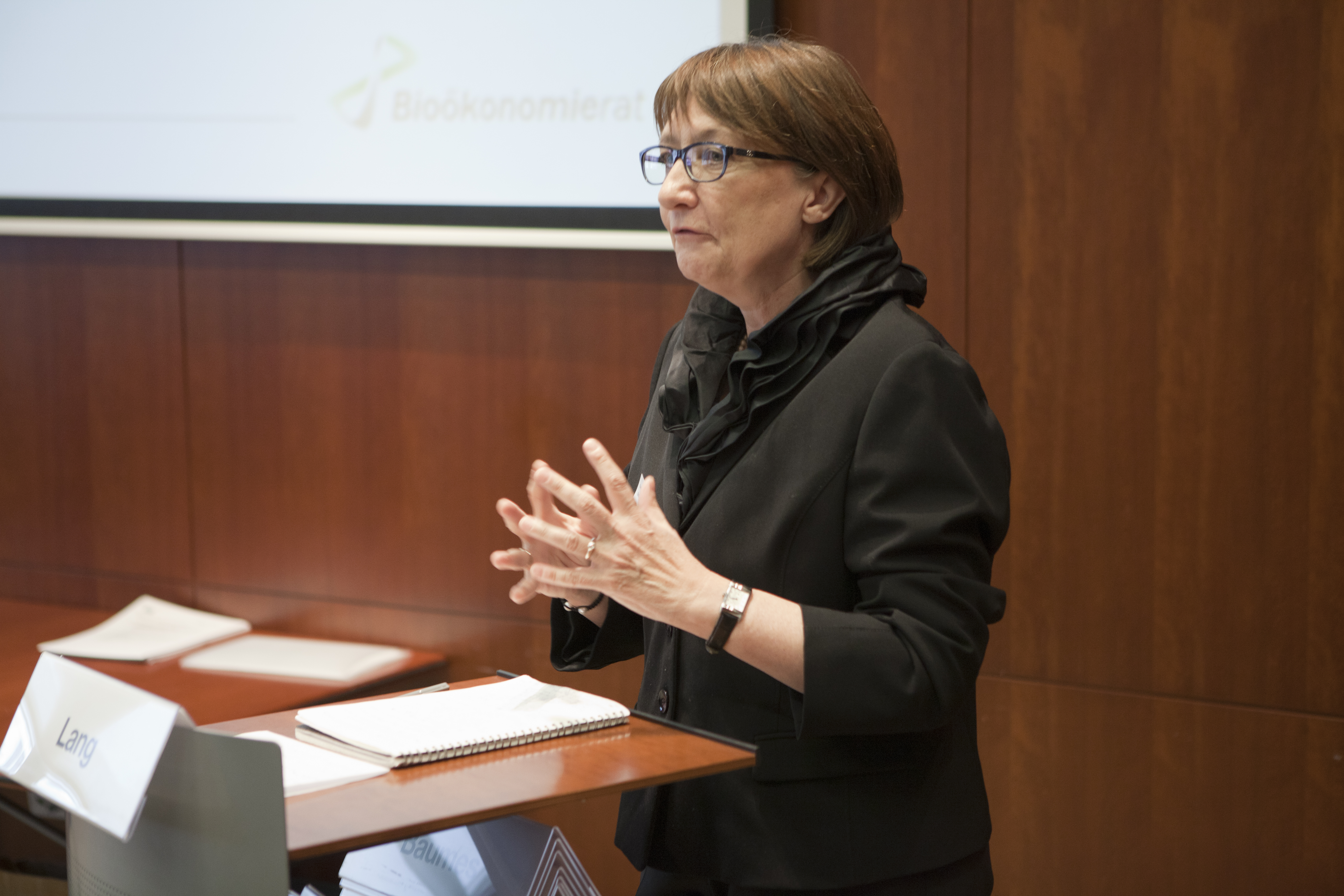
Christine Lang, Foreign Agriculture Service Bioeconomy Conference (2015)

Since 2012, Christine Lang, together with the agricultural economist Joachim von Braun, chaired the Bioeconomy Council of the German Federal Government, which advised the German government on the further development of the bioeconomy in Germany. With the expiration of the national research strategy in July 2019, the term of the Bioeconomy Council ended as well.

- Board member of the German Society for Chemical Engineering and Biotechnology e.V.
- Board member of the German Biotechnology Industry Association (professional association in the German Chemical Industry Association)
- since 2013: Advisory Board of the Association for General and Applied Microbiology (VAAM) as representative of Industrial Microbiology
- 2017–2019: Vice President of the VAAM, 2019–2021: President
- Board of Trustees Fraunhofer IAP
- Scientific Advisory Board Helmholtz Centre for Environmental Research – UFZ
- Scientific Advisory Board Leibniz Institute of Agricultural Engineering and Bioeconomy, Potsdam
- Board of Trustees Technical University of Munich, Institute for Advanced Study – IAS
- Advisory Board of Cerefort GmbH, Füringen
- Co-Chair of the Industrial Bioeconomy Working Group in the Biotechnology Industry Association BIO Deutschland
- Co-Chair of the International Advisory Council on Global Bioeconomy

== Works (selection) ==
=== Monographs ===
- (1986) Extrachromosomale In-vitro-Genetik bei Pilzen – Chondriom-Vektoren bei Hefen. Series: Bibliotheca mycologica. Vol. 102. Berlin and Stuttgart: J. Cramer in der Gebrüder-Borntraeger-Verlags-Buchhandlung. ISBN 9783443590031. (in German)
- (2020) with Boris A. Shenderov, Alexander V. Sinitsa, Mikhail M. Zakharchenko: Metabiotics. Present State, Challenges and Perspectives. Cham: Springer Nature. ISBN 9783030341664.

=== Contributions (selection) ===
- (20210) with J. M. Tanzer, A. Thompson, L. Hareng, A. Garner, A. Reindl, Markus Pompejus: ″Caries Inhibition by and Safety of Lactobacillus paracasei DSMZ16671″. In: Journal of Dental Research. Vol. 89, June 2, 2010, doi:10.1177/0022034510369460, pp. 921–926.
- (2011) with Raab, Andreas M.: ″Oxidative versus reductive succinic acid production in the yeast Saccharomyces cerevisiae″. In: Bioengineered Bugs. Vol. 2, No. 2, March 1, 2011, doi:10.4161/bbug.2.2.14549, pp. 1–4.
- with Andreas M. Raab, Verena Hlavacek, Natalia Bolotina: Shifting the Fermentative/Oxidative Balance in Saccharomyces cerevisiae by Transcriptional Deregulation of the Snf1 Upstream Activating Kinase Sak1p. In: Applied and environmental microbiology. Band 77, Nr. 6, 21. Januar 2011, doi:10.1128/AEM.02219-10, pp. 1981–1989.
- with Caterina Holz, Christiane Alexander, Christina Balcke, Margret Moré, Annegret Auinger, Maren Bauer, Lauren Junker, Jörg Grünwald, Markus Pompejus (2013): Lactobacillus paracasei DSMZ16671 Reduces Mutans Streptococci: A Short-Term Pilot Study. In: Probiotics and Antimicrobial Proteins. Band 5, 8. September 2013, doi:10.1007/s12602-013-9148-9, pp. 259–263.
- with Caterina Holz, Andreas Busjahn, Heidrun Mehling, Stefanie Arya, Mewes Boettner, Hajar Habibi: Significant reduction in Helicobacter pylori load in humans with non-viable Lactobacillus reuteri DSM17648. A pilot study. In: Probiotics and Antimicrobial Proteins. Band 7, Nr. 2, Juni 2015, doi:10.1007/s12602-014-9181-3, pp. 91–100.
- with Caterina Holz: Helicobacter-Infektion mit Bakterien bekämpfen. In: DZKF – Deutsche Zeitschrift für Klinische Forschung. Nr. 4, April 2015, pp. 23–26. (in German)
- with Beate El-Chichakli, Joachim von Braun, Daniel Barben, Jim Philp: Policy: Five cornerstones of a global bioeconomy. In: Nature. Band 535, Juli 2016, doi:10.1038/535221a, pp. 221–223.
- with Caterina Holz, J. Benning, M. Schaudt, A. Heilmann, J. Schultchen, D. Goelling: Novel bioactive from Lactobacillus brevis DSM17250 to stimulate the growth of Staphylococcus epidermidis: a pilot study. In: Beneficial Microbes. Band 8, Nr. 1, 2017, pp. 121–131. pdf.
- Lactobacillus – Mikrobe des Jahres. Lactobacillus – Alleskönner für die Gesundheit? In: BioSpektrum. Band 24, Nr. 1, Februar 2018, doi:10.1007/s12268-018-0885-x, pp. 23–26. (in German)
