= Katia Overfeldt =

Belgian synchronized swimmer

Personal information
- Nationality: Belgium
- Born: 14 March 1968 (age 58) Kortrijk, Belgium
- Height: 1.65 m (5 ft 5 in)
- Weight: 50 kg (110 lb)

Sport
- Sport: Swimming
- Strokes: Synchronized swimming
- Updated on 17 November 2014

Katia Overfeldt (born 14 March 1968) is a former synchronized swimmer from Belgium. She competed in both the women's solo and the women's duet competitions at the 1984 Summer Olympics.
