= Antonella Terenzi =

Italian synchronized swimmer

Personal information
- Nationality: Italy
- Born: 28 December 1965 (age 60) Rome, Italy
- Height: 1.70 m (5 ft 7 in)
- Weight: 60 kg (130 lb)

Sport
- Sport: Swimming
- Strokes: Synchronized swimming
- Updated on 16 November 2014

Antonella Terenzi (born 28 December 1965) is a former synchronized swimmer from Italy. She competed in the women's solo competition at the 1984 Summer Olympics.
