= Dahlia Mokbel =

Egyptian synchronized swimmer

Personal information
- Nationality: Egypt
- Born: 25 May 1969 (age 57)

Sport
- Sport: Swimming
- Strokes: Synchronized swimming
- Updated on 16 November 2014

Dahlia Mokbel (born 25 May 1969) is a former synchronized swimmer from Egypt. She participated in the women's solo and the women's duet at the 1984 Summer Olympics.
