= Kenyon Smith =

American synchronized swimmer

Personal information
- Born: 1990 (age 35–36)

Sport
- Sport: Synchronised swimming

Kenyon Smith (born 1990) was a male synchronized swimmer.

Smith became interested in the sport from one of his sisters, and joined the Santa Clara Aquamaids. He had hoped to compete in the 2008 Summer Olympics, but could not because synchronized swimming at the Summer Olympics is an all-female sport.
