= Ana Amicarella =

Venezuelan synchronized swimmer

Personal information
- Nationality: Venezuela
- Born: 9 April 1966 (age 60)

Sport
- Sport: Swimming
- Strokes: Synchronized swimming
Medal record
Representing Venezuela
Synchronized swimming
Pan American Games
Bronze medal – third place	1983 Caracas	Women's solo
- Updated on 19 November 2014

Ana Amicarella (born 9 April 1966) is a former synchronized swimmer from Venezuela. She competed in the women's solo competition at the 1984 Summer Olympics.
