= Mónica Antich =

Spanish synchronized swimmer

Personal information
- Nationality: Spain
- Born: 31 August 1966 (age 59)
- Height: 1.70 m (5 ft 7 in)
- Weight: 63 kg (139 lb)

Sport
- Sport: Swimming
- Strokes: Synchronized swimming
- Club: CN Kallipolis
- Updated on 18 November 2014

Mónica Antich (born 31 August 1966) is a former synchronized swimmer from Spain. She competed in the women's solo and the women's duet at the 1984 Summer Olympics.
