= Lisa Steanes =

Australian synchronised swimmer

Personal information
- Nationality: Australia
- Born: 30 December 1972 (age 53)
- Height: 1.70 m (5 ft 7 in)
- Weight: 61 kg (134 lb)

Sport
- Sport: Swimming
- Strokes: Synchronised swimming
- Updated on 16 November 2014

Lisa Steanes (born 23 May 1958) is a former synchronised swimmer from Australia. She competed in both the women's solo and women's duet competitions at the 1984 Summer Olympics.
