= Serena Bianchi =

Italian synchronized swimmer

Personal information
- Born: June 15, 1974 (age 52) Savona, Italy

Sport
- Sport: Synchronised swimming
Medal record
Representing Italy
European Championships
Silver medal – second place	2000 Helsinki	Team competition
Bronze medal – third place	1995 Vienna	Team competition
Bronze medal – third place	1997 Seville	Duet competition
Bronze medal – third place	1997 Seville	Team competition
Bronze medal – third place	1999 Istanbul	Team competition

Serena Bianchi (born 15 June 1974) is an Italian former synchronized swimmer who competed in the 1996 Summer Olympics and in the 2000 Summer Olympics.
