= Pascale Besson =

French synchronized swimmer

Personal information
- Nationality: France
- Born: 24 January 1960 (age 66)
- Height: 1.77 m (5 ft 10 in)

Sport
- Sport: Swimming
- Strokes: Synchronized swimming
- Club: C.N.O.
Medal record
Representing France
Synchronized swimming
European Aquatics Championships
Silver medal – second place	1985 Sofia	Women's duet

Pascale Besson (born 24 January 1960) is a former synchronized swimmer from France. She competed in both the women's solo and the women's duet competitions at the 1984 Summer Olympics.
