= Nicole Hoevertsz =

Dutch Antillean synchronized swimmer

Nicole Hoevertsz OLY
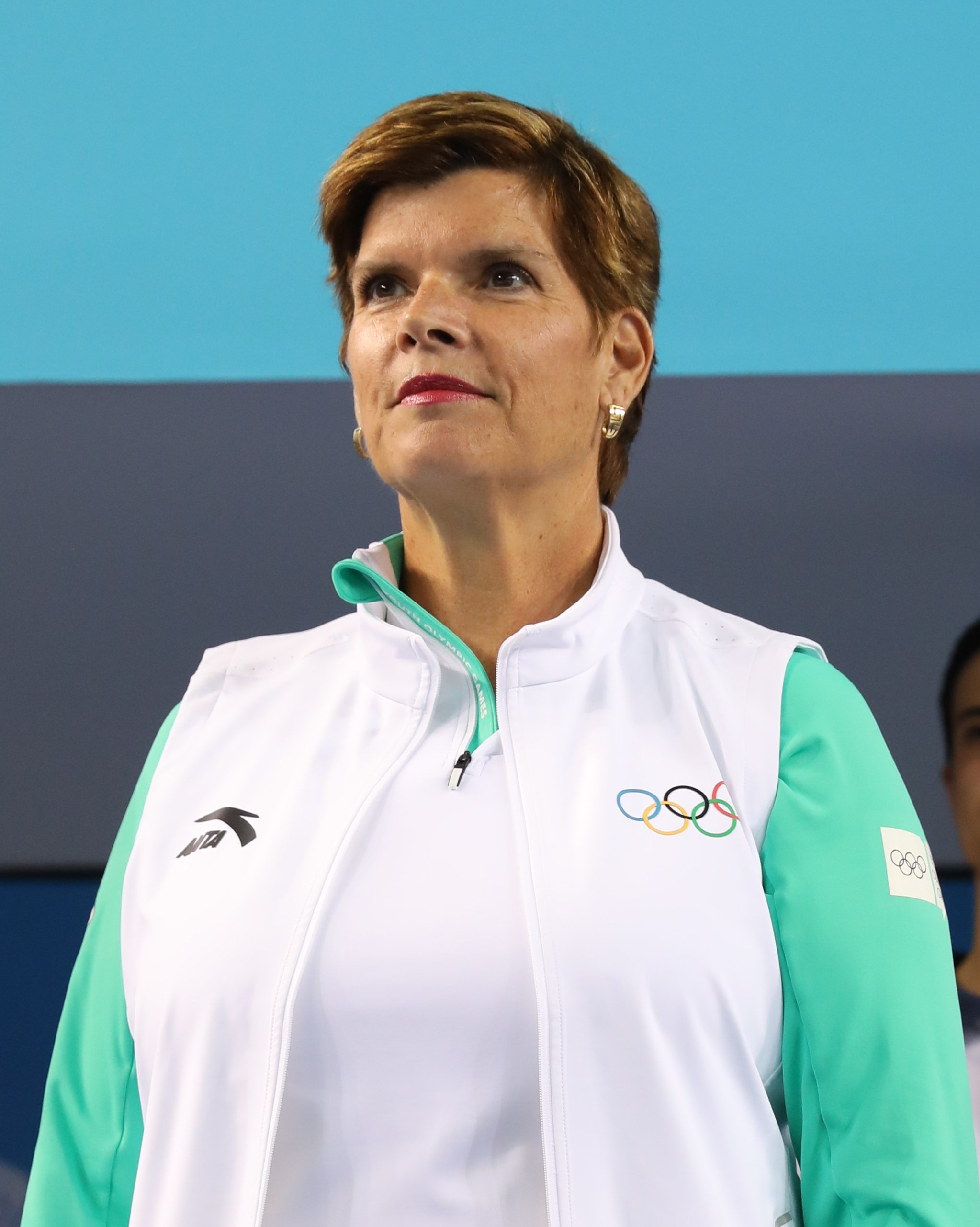
- Nicole Hoevertsz (2018)

Personal information
- Full name: Nicole L. M. Hoevertsz
- Nationality: Aruba
- Born: 30 May 1964 (age 62) Oranjestad, Aruba

Sport
- Sport: Swimming
- Strokes: Synchronized swimming
- Updated on 16 November 2014

Nicole L. M. Hoevertsz (born 30 May 1964) is a former synchronized swimmer from Aruba (formerly part of the Netherlands Antilles). She competed in the women's duet competitions.

Nicole has been a member of the International Olympic Committee since 2006 and is currently a member of the IOC Executive Board. In July 2021 she was elected as the Vice-President of the IOC. She has additionally served as the secretary-general of the Aruban Swimming Federation since 1991 and was a member of the organizing committee for the 1999 Pan American Games as well as a member of the Executive Board of the Pan American Sports Organization.

She studied law at the Colegio Arubano, the University of The Netherlands Antilles (now the University of Curaçao), and Leiden University. She served as a legal advisor to the Department of Foreign Affairs of Aruba from 1991-94 and then since 2002. She additionally served as Deputy Permanent Secretary to the Council of Ministers of Aruba from 1994-96, and as legal advisor to the Prime Minister of Aruba from 1997-2001. She was furthermore appointed as the Permanent Secretary to the Council of Ministers in 2009.
