= Esther Croes =

Dutch Antillean synchronized swimmer

Personal information
- Full name: Esther Casandra Croes
- Nationality: Netherlands Antilles
- Born: 28 July 1966 (age 59) The Netherlands
- Height: 1.73 m (5 ft 8 in)
- Weight: 60 kg (132 lb)

Sport
- Sport: Swimming
- Updated on 16 November 2014

Esther Croes (born 28 July 1966) is a former synchronized swimmer from the Netherlands Antilles. She competed in both the women's duet competitions at the 1984 Summer Olympics.
