= Marijke Engelen =

Dutch synchronized swimmer

Personal information
- Full name: Maria Theresia Engelen
- Nationality: Netherlands
- Born: 30 November 1961 (age 64) Nijmegen, Netherlands
- Height: 5 ft 4 in (163 cm)
- Weight: 52 kg (115 lb)

Sport
- Sport: Swimming
- Strokes: Synchronized swimming
Medal record
Representing Netherlands
Synchronized swimming
European Aquatics Championships
Silver medal – second place	1977 Jönköping	Women's solo
Silver medal – second place	1977 Jönköping	Women's duet
Silver medal – second place	1981 Split	Women's duet
Bronze medal – third place	1981 Split	Women's solo
Bronze medal – third place	1983 Rome	Women's duet
- Updated on 13 December 2014

Marijke Engelen (born 30 November 1961) is a former synchronized swimmer from The Netherlands. She competed in both the women's solo and the women's duet competitions at the 1984 Summer Olympics.
