= Manuela Carnini =

Italian former synchronized swimmer

Personal information
- Born: October 12, 1973 (age 52) Busto Arsizio, Italy

Sport
- Sport: Synchronised swimming
Medal record
Representing Italy
European Championships
Bronze medal – third place	1991 Athens	Team competition
Bronze medal – third place	1993 Sheffield	Team competition
Bronze medal – third place	1995 Vienna	Duet competition
Bronze medal – third place	1995 Vienna	Team competition

Manuela Carnini (born 12 October 1973) is an Italian former synchronized swimmer who competed in the 1996 Summer Olympics.
