= Kelly Kryczka =

Canadian synchronized swimmer

Personal information
- Full name: Kelly Marie Kryczka
- Nationality: Canada
- Born: July 8, 1961 (age 65) Calgary, Alberta, Canada
- Height: 1.68 m (5 ft 6 in)
- Weight: 55 kg (121 lb)

Sport
- Sport: Swimming
- Strokes: Synchronized swimming
- Club: Calgary Aquabelles
- Coach: Debbie Muir
Medal record
Synchronized swimming
Representing Canada
Olympic Games
Silver medal – second place	1984 Los Angeles	Duet
World Aquatics Championships
Gold medal – first place	1982 Guayaquil	Team
Gold medal – first place	1982 Guayaquil	Duet
Silver medal – second place	1982 Guayaquil	Solo
Pan American Games
Gold medal – first place	1979 San Juan	Duet

Kelly Kryczka (born July 8, 1961) is a Canadian competitor in synchronized swimming, world champion and Olympic medalist.

== Career ==
Kelly Kryczka began synchronized swimming at the Calgary Glencoe Club and then moved on to train with the Calgary Aquabelles. She and Helen Vanderburg earned gold in duet at the 1979 Canadian Aquatic Championships, a gold medal in duet at the 1979 Pan American Games in San Juan, and gold at the Federation Internationale De Natation Amateur Cup in 1979. Kryczka won the solo and duet events at the Canadian Aquatic Championships in 1980.

After Helen Vanderburg retired in 1979 Kryczka paired with Sharon Hambrook. They received a gold medal in duet at the 1982 World Aquatics Championships in Guayaquil, where Kryczka also received a silver medal in solo and a gold medal in the team event.

Kryczka won a silver medal in the women's duet with Sharon Hambrook at the 1984 Summer Olympics in Los Angeles, the first year that the sport was recognized by the Olympics.

== Honours ==
Kelly Kryczka was inducted into the Canadian Olympic Hall of Fame in 1996, and the Alberta Sports Hall of Fame in 1980.

== Family ==
Kryczka is the daughter of Alberta politician Karen Kryczka, and the niece of Joe Kryczka.
