= Andrea Holland =

British synchronised swimmer and coach

Personal information
- Born: 29 June 1958 (age 67) Guildford, Great Britain

Sport
- Sport: Synchronised swimming
Medal record
Representing Great Britain
European Championships
Gold medal – first place	1977 Jönköping	Duet

Andrea Holland (born 29 June 1958) is a former British synchronised swimmer and coach of the Swiss and British synchronised swimming teams. She competed at the 1978 World Aquatics Championships, where she finished 4th in the duet event and the 1977 European Aquatics Championships, where she received a gold medal in the duet event with Jackie Cox.

Since the 90's, she has been a synchronised swimming freelance commentator.
