= Caroline Holmyard =

British synchronised swimmer

Personal information
- Nationality: United Kingdom
- Born: 17 December 1961 (age 64) Bristol, England
- Height: 1.71 m (5 ft 7 in)
- Weight: 55 kg (121 lb)

Sport
- Sport: Swimming
- Strokes: Synchronised swimming
- Club: Bristol Central SC
Medal record
Synchronised swimming
Representing United Kingdom
European Aquatics Championships
Gold medal – first place	1981 Split	Women's duet
- Updated on 19 November 2014

Caroline Holmyard (born 17 December 1961) is a former synchronised swimmer from Great Britain. She competed in both the women's solo and the women's duet competitions at the 1984 Summer Olympics.
