= Gudrun Hänisch =

German synchronized swimmer

Personal information
- Nationality: West Germany
- Born: 6 November 1963 (age 62) Willich, Germany
- Height: 1.75 m (5 ft 9 in)
- Weight: 63 kg (139 lb)

Sport
- Sport: Swimming
- Strokes: Synchronized swimming
- Club: DJK St. Tönis
Medal record
Representing West Germany
Synchronized swimming
European Aquatics Championships
Silver medal – second place	1983 Rome	Women's duet
Bronze medal – third place	1983 Rome	Women's solo
- Updated on 19 November 2014

Gudrun Hänisch (born 6 November 1963) is a former synchronized swimmer from Germany. She competed for West Germany in both the women's solo and women's duet competitions at the 1984 Summer Olympics.
