= Miwako Motoyoshi =

Japanese synchronized swimmer

Personal information
- Nationality: Japanese
- Born: 21 December 1960 (age 65) Osaka, Japan
- Height: 1.63 m (5 ft 4 in)
- Weight: 51 kg (112 lb)

Sport
- Sport: Swimming
- Strokes: Synchronized swimming
Medal record
Synchronized swimming
Representing Japan
Olympic Games
Bronze medal – third place	1984 Los Angeles	Women's solo
Bronze medal – third place	1984 Los Angeles	Women's duet
World Aquatics Championships
Bronze medal – third place	1982 Guayaquil	Solo routine
- Updated on 14 February 2015

Miwako Motoyoshi (元好 三和子, Motoyoshi Miwako; born 21 December 1960) is a Japanese former synchronized swimmer who competed in the 1984 Summer Olympics.
