= Giada Ballan =

Italian synchronized swimmer

Personal information
- Born: 19 October 1973 (age 52) Castelfranco Veneto, Treviso, Italy

Sport
- Sport: Swimming
Medal record
Representing Italy
European Championships
Silver medal – second place	2000 Helsinki	Team competition
Bronze medal – third place	1991 Athens	Team competition
Bronze medal – third place	1993 Sheffield	Team competition
Bronze medal – third place	1995 Vienna	Team competition
Bronze medal – third place	1997 Seville	Team competition
Bronze medal – third place	1997 Seville	Duet competition
Bronze medal – third place	1999 Istanbul	Team competition

Giada Ballan (born 19 October 1973) is an Italian former synchronized swimmer who competed in the 1996 Summer Olympics and in the 2000 Summer Olympics.
