= Laure Thibaud =

French synchronized swimmer (born 1978)

Personal information
- Nationality: French
- Born: 2 July 1978 (age 48) Nîmes
- Height: 166 cm (5 ft 5 in) (2004)
- Weight: 52 kg (115 lb) (2004)

Sport
- Country: France
- Sport: Synchronized swimming
- Retired: 2004

Achievements and titles
- Olympic finals: 2004 Summer Olympics
Medal record
Synchronized swimming
Representing France
LEN European Aquatics Championships
Bronze medal – third place	2004 Madrid	Duet

Laure Thibaud (born 2 July 1978) is a French former synchronized swimmer.

== Synchronized swimming ==
Thibaud joined the National Team in 2000, after the Sydney Games.

Thibaud competed at the 2002 European Aquatics Championships and 2003 World Aquatics Championships. She won a bronze medal at the 2004 European Aquatics Championships with Virginie Dedieu and they finished 5th at the 2004 Summer Olympics.

Thibaud retired after the Athens 2004 Games at the age of 26. She is now technical advisor of the North-East of France for FINA.
