= Catrien Eijken =

Dutch synchronized swimmer

Personal information
- Full name: Catharina Petronella Eijken
- Nationality: Netherlands
- Born: 29 June 1961 (age 65) Singapore
- Height: 5 ft 7 in (170 cm)
- Weight: 63 kg (139 lb)

Sport
- Sport: Swimming
- Strokes: Synchronized swimming
Medal record
Representing Netherlands
Synchronized swimming
European Aquatics Championships
Silver medal – second place	1981 Split	Women's duet
Bronze medal – third place	1983 Rome	Women's duet
- Updated on 14 December 2014

Catrien Eijken (born 29 June 1961) is a former synchronized swimmer from The Netherlands. She competed in both the women's solo and the women's duet competitions at the 1984 Summer Olympics.
