= Maurizia Cecconi =

Italian synchronized swimmer

Personal information
- Born: April 12, 1975 (age 51) Rome, Italy

Sport
- Sport: Synchronised swimming
Medal record
Representing Italy
European Championships
Silver medal – second place	2000 Helsinki	Team competition
Bronze medal – third place	1993 Sheffield	Team competition
Bronze medal – third place	1995 Vienna	Team competition
Bronze medal – third place	1999 Istanbul	Duet competition
Bronze medal – third place	1999 Istanbul	Team competition

Maurizia Cecconi (born 12 April 1975) is an Italian former synchronized swimmer who competed in the 1996 Summer Olympics and in the 2000 Summer Olympics.
