= Beatrice Adelizzi =

Italian synchronized swimmer

Personal information
- Born: 11 November 1988 (age 37) Monza, Italy

Sport
- Sport: Synchronised swimming
Medal record
Representing Italy
World Championships
Bronze medal – third place	2009 Rome	Solo, free
European Championships
Silver medal – second place	2008 Eindhoven	Duet
Bronze medal – third place	2008 Eindhoven	Solo

Beatrice Adelizzi (born 11 November 1988) is an Italian synchronized swimmer who competed in the 2008 Summer Olympics.
