= Paula Carvalho =

Brazilian synchronized swimmer

Personal information
- Nationality: Brazil
- Born: 9 April 1965 (age 61)
- Height: 1.65 m (5 ft 5 in)
- Weight: 62 kg (137 lb)

Sport
- Sport: Swimming
- Strokes: Synchronized swimming
- Updated on 16 November 2014

Paula Carvalho (born 9 April 1965) is a former synchronized swimmer from Brazil. She competed in both the 1984 and 1988 Summer Olympics.

Paula's sister is Tessa Carvalho, who was her partner in the women's duet at the 1984 Summer Olympics.
