= Giovanna Burlando =

Italian synchronized swimmer

Personal information
- Nationality: Italy
- Born: 20 November 1969 (age 56) Genoa, Italy
- Height: 1.72 m (5 ft 8 in)
- Weight: 60 kg (130 lb)

Sport
- Sport: Swimming
- Strokes: Synchronized swimming
- Club: Sportiva Sturla
- Updated on 22 May 2015

Giovanna Burlando (born 20 November 1969) is an Italian former synchronized swimmer who competed in the 1992, 1996 and 2000 Summer Olympics.
