= Sharon Hambrook =

Canadian synchronized swimmer

Personal information
- Born: March 28, 1963 (age 63) Calgary, Alberta, Canada
- Height: 1.59 m (5 ft 3 in)
- Weight: 52 kg (115 lb)

Sport
- Country: Canada
- Sport: Swimming
- Strokes: Synchronized swimming
- Club: Calgary Aquabelles
- Coach: Debbie Muir
Medal record
Synchronized swimming
Representing Canada
Olympic Games
Silver medal – second place	1984 Los Angeles	Women's duet
World Aquatics Championships
Gold medal – first place	1982 Guayaquil	Women's duet
Gold medal – first place	1982 Guayaquil	Women's team
Pan American Games
Silver medal – second place	1983 Caracas	Women's solo
- Updated on 14 February 2015

Sharon Hambrook (born March 28, 1963) is a Canadian former world champion and Olympic medalist in synchronized swimming.

== Career ==
Hambrook trained with the Calgary Aquabelles. She won a gold medal with her partner Kelly Kryczka in the women's duet at the 1982 World Aquatics Championships in Guayaquil as well as a gold medal in the team event. She received a silver medal in the women's solo at the 1983 Pan American Games in Caracas. Her most notable success was a silver medal in the women's duet with Kelly Kryczka at the 1984 Summer Olympics in Los Angeles, the first year that the sport was recognized by the Olympics.

== Honours ==
Sharon Hambrook was inducted into the Canadian Olympic Hall of Fame in 1996, and was inducted into the Alberta Sports Hall of Fame in 1988.
