= Carolyn Wilson =

British former synchronised swimmer (born 1959)

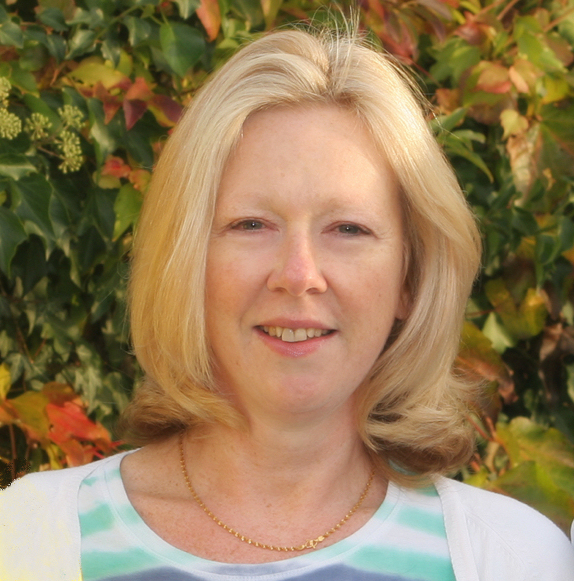

Personal information
- Nationality: United Kingdom
- Born: 11 March 1959 (age 67) Farnborough, England
- Height: 1.75 m (5 ft 9 in)
- Weight: 59 kg (130 lb)

Sport
- Sport: Swimming
- Strokes: Synchronised swimming
- Club: Rushmoor Synchronised Swimming Club
Medal record
Synchronised swimming
Representing Great Britain
European Aquatics Championships
Gold medal – first place	1981 Split	Women's duet
Gold medal – first place	1981 Split	Women's solo
Gold medal – first place	1981 Split	Women's team
Gold medal – first place	1983 Rome	Women's duet
Gold medal – first place	1983 Rome	Women's solo
Gold medal – first place	1983 Rome	Women's team
Gold medal – first place	1985 Sofia	Women's solo
Silver medal – second place	1985 Sofia	Women's team
Bronze medal – third place	1985 Sofia	Women's duet
- Updated on 13 December 2014

Carolyn Wilson (born 11 March 1959) is a British former synchronised swimmer. She was the European solo champion in 1981, 1983 and 1985. She won 7 European Gold medals, and competed in the women's duet competition at the 1984 Summer Olympics gaining a 4th place.

Wilson choreographed the synchronised swimming scenes in the Kenneth Branagh film Love's Labour's Lost (2000 film) and has appeared on a number of television programmes such as Jim'll Fix It, The Generation Game and How Do They Do That?. She was also one of the swimmers in the Carling Black Label UK TV advert "Lady of the Lake"

She retired from competitive synchronised swimming in August 1985. She is a life member of Rushmoor Synchronised Swimming Club.

Wilson holds a BSc Hons degree in Botany & Zoology from Bristol University (1981), a Postgraduate Certificate in Education from Reading University and a First Class Master's degree with Distinction in Institutional Management & Leadership for Professional Development from Southampton University (2007). She is currently Assistant Deputy Head & Head of Science at a school in Guildford, England.
