= Saeko Kimura =

Japanese synchronized swimmer

Personal information
- Nationality: Japan
- Born: January 28, 1963 (age 63) Osaka, Japan
- Height: 1.63 m (5 ft 4 in)
- Weight: 51 kg (112 lb)

Sport
- Sport: Swimming
- Strokes: Synchronized swimming
Medal record
Synchronized swimming
Representing Japan
Olympic Games
Bronze medal – third place	1984 Los Angeles	Duet
- Updated on 14 February 2015

Saeko Kimura (木村 さえこ, Kimura Saeko; born 28 January 1963) is a Japanese former synchronized swimmer who competed in the 1984 Summer Olympics.
