= Ana Tarrés =

Spanish synchronized swimmer and politician

Anna Tarrés
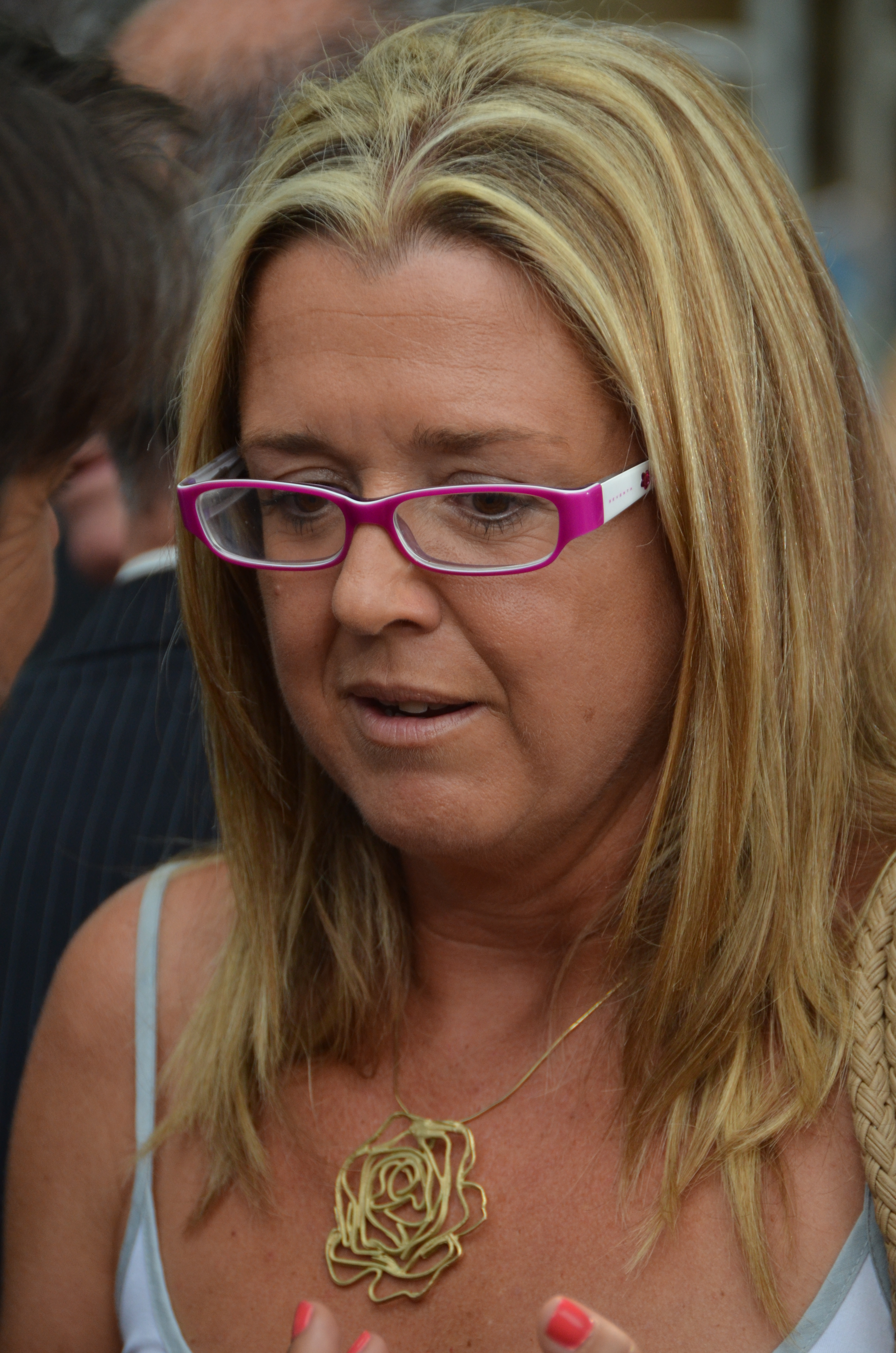
- Tarrés in 2012

Personal information
- Full name: Anna Tarrés Campà
- Nationality: Spain
- Born: 19 October 1967 (age 58) Barcelona, Spain
- Height: 1.60 m (5 ft 3 in)

Sport
- Sport: Swimming
- Strokes: Synchronized swimming
- Club: CN Kallipolis
- Updated on 18 November 2014

Ana Tarrés

Member of the Catalan Parliament
- Incumbent
- Assumed office 17 January 2018
- Constituency: Barcelona

Anna Tarrés Campà (born 19 October 1967) is a synchronized swimming coach and former national synchronized swimmer from Spain. She competed in the women's duet at the 1984 Summer Olympics. After retiring from competition Tarrés began coaching at her swimming club, CN Kallipolis, in 1987, where she coached Gemma Mengual to international success. In 1997 she was appointed as head coach of the Spanish national synchronised swimming team: during her time in charge the team enjoyed great success, taking four Olympic medals, 26 World Championship medals, and 25 European Championship medals, however in September 2012 the Royal Spanish Swimming Federation informed her that her contract would not be extended beyond the end of the year. Shortly afterwards 15 former members of the team issued a public letter criticising Tarrés for using authoritarian and demeaning behaviour in her role as head coach, although Mengual and national team captain Andrea Fuentes both spoke in Tarrés' defence, and Fuentes subsequently announced her retirement from elite competition in January 2013 due to demotivation as a result of the conflict between Tarrés and the federation. After her dismissal, Tarrés won a €383,000 lawsuit against the federation for unfair dismissal.

After leaving the Spanish national team Tarrés was appointed as one of the coaches of the Ukrainian national team in 2015. She coached the Chinese artistic swimming team for the 2024 Summer Olympics, leading them to a gold medal.

She was elected deputy in the Parliament of Catalonia in the 21 December 2017 Catalan regional elections.
