= Patricia Serneels =

Belgian synchronized swimmer

Personal information
- Nationality: Belgian
- Born: 6 June 1965 (age 61) Wilrijk, Belgium
- Height: 1.64 m (5 ft 5 in)
- Weight: 50 kg (110 lb)

Sport
- Sport: Swimming
- Strokes: Synchronized swimming
- Club: KAZC Syndrodolphins

Patricia Serneels (born 6 June 1965) is a former synchronized swimmer from Belgium. She competed in both the 1984 and 1988 Summer Olympics.
