= Eva-Maria Edinger =

Austrian synchronized swimmer

Personal information
- Nationality: Austria
- Born: June 13, 1966 (age 60)
- Height: 1.67 m (5 ft 6 in)
- Weight: 50 kg (110 lb)

Sport
- Sport: Swimming
- Strokes: Synchronized swimming
Medal record
Representing Austria
Synchronized swimming
European Aquatics Championships
Gold medal – first place	1985 Sofia	Women's duet
Bronze medal – third place	1981 Split	Women's duet
- Updated on 18 November 2014

Eva-Maria Edinger (born 13 June 1966) is a former synchronized swimmer from Austria. She competed in both the women's solo and the women's duet competitions at the 1984 Summer Olympics.
