= Muriel Hermine =

French synchronized swimmer

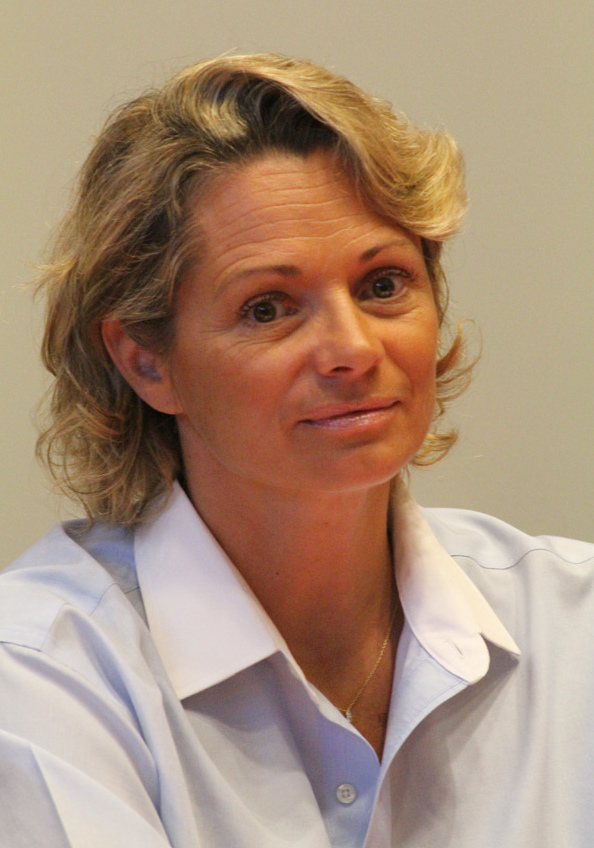

Personal information
- Nationality: France
- Born: 3 September 1963 (age 62) Le Mans, France
- Height: 1.78 m (5 ft 10 in)
- Weight: 59 kg (130 lb)

Sport
- Sport: Swimming
- Strokes: Synchronized swimming
- Club: Racing Club de France
Medal record
Representing France
Synchronized swimming
European Aquatics Championships
Gold medal – first place	1987 Strasbourg	Women's solo
Gold medal – first place	1987 Strasbourg	Women's duet
Gold medal – first place	1987 Strasbourg	Women's team
Gold medal – first place	1985 Sofia	Women's team
Silver medal – second place	1983 Rome	Women's solo
Silver medal – second place	1985 Sofia	Women's solo
Silver medal – second place	1985 Sofia	Women's duet
World Aquatics Championships
Bronze medal – third place	1986 Madrid	Women's solo
- Updated on 5 August 2015

Muriel Hermine (born 3 September 1963) is a synchronized swimmer from France. She competed in the 1984, 1988 Summer Olympics and won the 50-59 solo world title in the 2015 FINA Masters World Championships at the age of 51.
