= Gerlind Scheller =

German synchronized swimmer

Personal information
- Nationality: West Germany
- Born: 15 October 1967 (age 58) Berlin, Germany
- Height: 1.76 m (5 ft 9 in)
- Weight: 67 kg (148 lb)

Sport
- Sport: Swimming
- Strokes: Synchronized swimming
- Club: DJK St. Tönis
Medal record
Representing West Germany
Synchronized swimming
European Aquatics Championships
Silver medal – second place	1983 Rome	Women's duet
- Updated on 19 November 2014

Gerlind Scheller (born 15 October 1967) is a former synchronized swimmer from Germany. She competed for West Germany at both the 1984 and 1988 Summer Olympics.
