= Karin Singer =

Swiss synchronized swimmer

Personal information
- Nationality: Switzerland
- Born: 14 May 1966 (age 60) Buchs, Switzerland
- Height: 1.68 m (5 ft 6 in)
- Weight: 48 kg (106 lb)

Sport
- Sport: Swimming
- Strokes: Synchronized swimming
- Club: SC Flös Buchs
Medal record
Synchronized swimming
Representing Switzerland
European Aquatics Championships
Silver medal – second place	1987 Strasbourg	Women's duet
Bronze medal – third place	1989 Bonn	Women's duet
- Updated on 18 November 2014

Karin Singer (born 14 May 1966) is a former synchronized swimmer from Switzerland. She competed in both the women's solo and the women's duet competitions at the 1984 and 1988 Summer Olympics.
