= Edith Boss =

Swiss synchronized swimmer

Personal information
- Nationality: Switzerland
- Born: 3 January 1966 (age 60) Bern, Switzerland
- Height: 1.72 m (5 ft 8 in)
- Weight: 60 kg (130 lb)

Sport
- Sport: Swimming
- Strokes: Synchronized swimming
- Club: SY Bern
Medal record
Synchronized swimming
Representing Switzerland
European Aquatics Championships
Silver medal – second place	1987 Strasbourg	Women's duet
Bronze medal – third place	1989 Bonn	Women's duet
- Updated on 18 November 2014

Edith Boss (born 3 January 1966) is a former synchronized swimmer from Switzerland. She competed in both the women's solo and the women's duet competitions at the 1984 and 1988 Summer Olympics.
