= Italy at the European Aquatics Championships =

Italy team at swimming event

- World Aquatics code: ITA
- National federation: FIN
- Website: www.federnuoto.it
- Medals Ranked 3rd: Gold 143 Silver 175 Bronze 220 Total 538

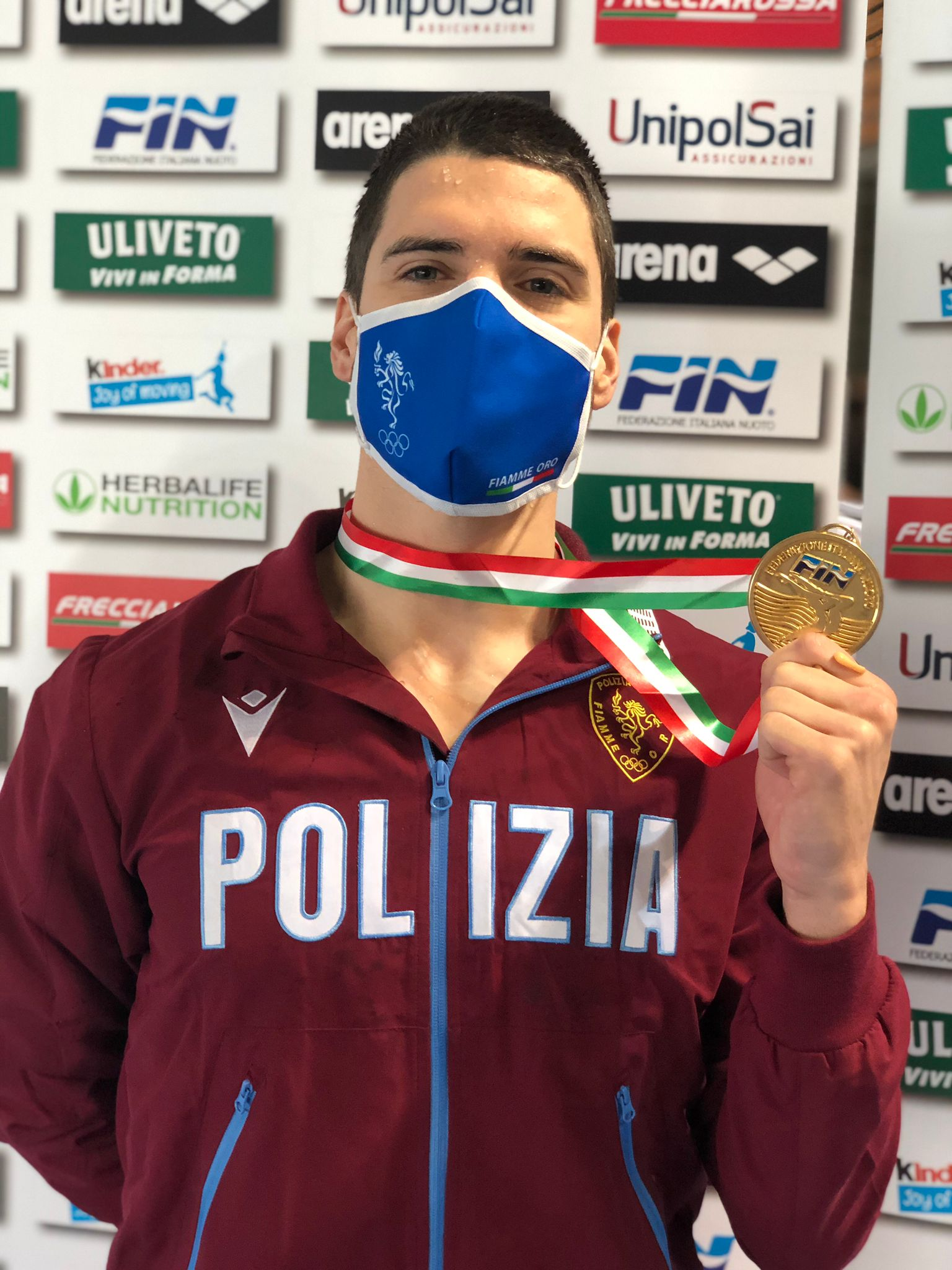
Giorgio Minisini, first historic Italian gold medal in artistic swimming only arrived at the 23rd edition of the Europeans at Rome 2022.

Italy has participated in all 36 editions of the LEN European Aquatics Championships, since the first edition Budapest 1926 to Rome 2022.

== Medals by disciplines ==
Are excluded European Open Water Swimming Championships stand alone (7 editions from 1989 to 2016 was discontinued), the European Water Polo Championship stand alone tournament (12 editions from 1999 to 2022) and the European Diving Championships stand alone (6 editions from 2009 to 2019).

Sport	First	Last	Editions	Gold	Silver	Bronze	Total	Rank	Notes
Swimming	1926	2022	36	76	91	107	274	5	
Waterpolo	1926	1997	23	5	0	6	10	4	(Note: From 1999 Water Polo European Championship was separated and got its own independent tournament.)
Diving	1926	2018	35	20	19	22	61	4	(Note: A separate European Diving Championships is a biennial competition and 6 editions from 2009 to 2019.)
Open water swimming	1995	2018	10	14	15	19	48	2	(Note: European Open Water Swimming Championships was seven-time stand alone championship (1989, 1991, 1993, 2008, 2011, 2012, 2016).)
Artistic swimming	1974	2018	22	0	12	31	43	9	

== Swimming ==
Edition	Men			Women			Total				Rank
Edition	Gold medal	Silver medal	Bronze medal	Gold medal	Silver medal	Bronze medal	Gold medal	Silver medal	Bronze medal		Rank
(Hungary) Budapest 1926	0	0	0	0	0	0	0	0	0	0	
(Italy) Bologna 1927	0	1	0	0	0	0	0	1	0	1	6
(France) Paris 1931	0	1	3	0	0	0	0	1	3	4	7
(Germany) Magdeburg 1934	0	2	2	0	0	0	0	2	2	4	
(United Kingdom) London 1938	0	0	0	0	0	0	0	0	0	0	
(Monaco) Monte Carlo 1947	0	0	0	0	0	0	0	0	0	0	
(Austria) Vienna 1950	0	0	0	0	0	0	0	0	0	0	
(Italy) Turin 1954	0	1	0	0	0	0	0	1	0	1	7
(Hungary) Budapest 1958	1	2	2	0	0	0	1	2	2	5	4
(East Germany) Leipzig 1962	0	0	0	0	0	0	0	0	0	0	
(Netherlands) Utrecht 1966	0	0	0	0	0	0	0	0	0	0	
(Spain) Barcelona 1970	0	0	0	0	0	1	0	0	1	1	11
(Austria) Vienna 1974	0	0	0	0	1	1	0	1	1	2	8
(Sweden) Jönköping 1977	0	2	2	0	0	0	0	2	2	4	7
(Socialist Federal Republic of Yugoslavia) Split 1981	0	1	1	0	0	0	0	1	1	2	10
(Italy) Rome 1983	2	0	2	0	0	1	2	0	3	5	4
(Bulgaria) Sofia 1985	0	0	1	0	0	0	0	0	1	1	14
(France) Strasbourg 1987	0	1	1	0	2	0	0	3	1	4	8
(West Germany) Bonn 1989	4	0	2	0	1	3	4	1	5	10	2
(Greece) Athens 1991	1	2	5	0	0	2	1	2	7	10	8
(United Kingdom) Sheffield 1993	0	0	1	0	1	0	0	1	1	2	11
(Austria) Vienna 1995	0	0	2	0	1	0	0	1	2	3	13
(Spain) Sevilla 1997	2	3	0	0	0	0	2	3	0	5	3
(Turkey) Istanbul 1999	1	3	2	0	0	0	1	3	2	6	9
(Finland) Helsinki 2000	5	3	1	0	2	0	5	5	1	11	3
(Germany) Berlin 2002	4	5	2	0	0	0	4	5	2	11	3
(Spain) Madrid 2004	5	1	6	0	1	1	5	2	7	14	3
(Hungary) Budapest 2006	4	5	2	1	1	2	5	6	4	15	3
(Netherlands) Eindhoven 2008	1	4	3	3	1	1	4	5	4	13	3
(Hungary) Budapest 2010	1	0	3	1	0	1	2	0	4	6	8
(Hungary) Debrecen 2012	4	5	3	2	3	1	6	8	4	18	3
(Germany) Berlin 2014 (Note: One gold medal by mixed relay.)	2.5	1	5	2.5	0	4	5	1	9	15	4
(United Kingdom) London 2016 (Note: Two silver medals by mixed relays.)	4	4	4	1	3	1	5	7	5	17	3
(United Kingdom) Glasgow 2018 (Note: One bronze medal by mixed relays.)	2	3	6.5	4	2	4.5	6	5	11	22	3
(Hungary) Budapest 2021							5	9	13	27	3
(Italy) Rome 2022							13	13	9	35	1
(Serbia) Belgrade 2024											
(France) Paris 2026							6	8	6	20	2
Total	43.5	50	61.5	14.5	19	23.5	82	99	113	294	3

note 1: in italic to update.
note 2: Where it is reported half medal refers to those assigned in mixed relays from 2014 for the first time.

=== Gold medalists ===
Relays are included, open water is not included.

Still active

Swimmer	1st	2nd	3rd	Total
Simona Quadarella	11	1	1	12
Emiliano Brembilla (Note: Although by mistake the gold medal with the 4×200 m freestyle relay in Budapest 2006 was not included in the LEN reports, Brembilla won that medal because he competed in the heats.)	10	3	0	13
Filippo Magnini	9	5	5	19
Massimiliano Rosolino	7	8	6	21
Federica Pellegrini	7	6	7	20
Gregorio Paltrinieri	6	5	1	12
Nicolò Martinenghi	5	2	3	10
Thomas Ceccon	4	4	5	13
Margherita Panziera	4	2	3	9
Christian Galenda	4	1	2	7
Alessandro Miressi	3	3	6	12
Giorgio Lamberti	3	3	3	9
Fabio Scozzoli	3	2	2	7
Alessia Filippi	3	0	2	5
Matteo Pelliciari	3	0	0	3
Luca Dotto	2	3	3	8
Benedetta Pilato	2	3	1	6
Lorenzo Vismara	2	2	3	7
Alice Mizzau	2	1	3	6
Stefano Battistelli	2	1	2	5
Giovanni Franceschi	2	1	1	4
Domenico Fioravanti	2	1	0	3
Matteo Rivolta	2	1	0	3
Manuel Frigo	2	0	3	5
Nicola Cassio	2	0	0	2
Alberto Razzetti	1	4	2	7
Erika Ferraioli	1	4	2	7
Gabriele Detti	1	3	4	8
Sara Curtis	1	2	3	6
Luca Leonardi	1	2	3	6
Filippo Megli	1	2	3	6
Alessio Boggiatto	1	2	2	5
Leonardo Deplano	1	2	1	4
Michele Lamberti	1	2	0	3
Federico Burdisso	1	1	2	4
Paolo Pucci	1	1	1	3
Lorenzo Zazzeri	1	1	1	3
Piero Codia	1	1	1	3
Stefania Pirozzi	1	1	1	3
Roberto Gleria	1	1	1	3
Giada Galizi	1	1	0	2
Alessandro Calvi	1	1	0	2
Alessandro Terrin	1	1	0	2
Mirco Di Tora	1	1	0	2
Paolo Bossini	1	1	0	2
Luca Sacchi	1	0	2	2
Erica Buratto	1	0	1	2
Simone Cercato	1	0	1	2
Chiara Masini Luccetti	1	0	0	1
Alice Nesti	1	0	0	1
Diletta Carli	1	0	0	1
David Berbotto	1	0	0	1
Giacomo Vassanelli	1	0	0	1
Davide Rummolo	1	0	0	1
Federico Cappellazzo	1	0	0	1
Massimo Trevisan	1	0	0	1

== Diving ==
Diving was an integral part of the European Aquatics Championships since its introduction in 1926. But also a separate European Diving Championships were first held in 2009 in Turin, the competition is biennial and 6 editions was held from 2009 to 2019.

== Open water swimming ==
European Open Water Swimming Championships was seven-time stand alone championship (1989, 1991, 1993, 2008, 2011, 2012, 2016) and eleven-time part of the European Aquatics Championships (1995, 1997, 1999, 2000, 2002, 2004, 2006, 2010, 2014, 2018, 2022).

== Artistic swimming ==
Formerly known as Synchronized swimming, is part of the program of the European Aquatics Championships from 1974.

== Water polo ==
The first European Water Polo Championship was held in 1926 in Budapest, Hungary, with just a men's competition. The women for the first time competed in 1985 (Oslo, Norway) for the European title. The water polo tournament was part of the European Aquatics Championships up to and including 1997, and from 1999 the event was separated and got its own independent tournament.

== See also ==
- Italy national swimming team
- Italy national diving team
- Italy at the World Aquatics Championships
- European Aquatics Championships all-time medal table
