= Italy national swimming team =

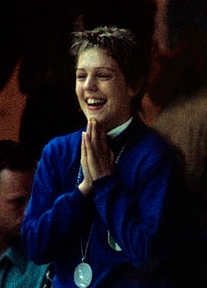
Novella Calligaris in 1972, first Italian to win an Olympic medal in swimming.

The Italy national swimming team represents Italy in International swimming competitions such as Olympic Games or World swimming Championships.

== History ==
The national Italian swimming team participated to all the Summer Olympics editions, from London 1908, 25 times on 29.

== Medal tables ==
Swimming

(not included open water swimming) ✓ update to last edition

Event	Editions	1st edition	last edition	Men				Women				Total				Ranking
Event	Editions	1st edition	last edition	Gold medal	Silver medal	Bronze medal	Tot.	Gold medal	Silver medal	Bronze medal	Tot.	Gold medal	Silver medal	Bronze medal	Tot.	Ranking
Olympic Games	25	1912	2024	6	4	14	24	1	3	3	7	7	7	17	31	15th
World Championships (LC) ✓	17	1973	2024									26	30	33	89	7th
European Championships (LC) ✓	34	1926	2024									76	90	108	274	5th
World Championships (SC) ✓	16	1993	2022									16	36	30	82	13th
European Championships (SC) ✓	22	1996	2023									82	98	88	268	5th

== Olympic Games ==
=== Swimming ===
The Italian national swimming team won its first medal at 1972 Summer Olympics with Novella Calligaris.

Edition	Gold	Silver	Bronze	Total
(West Germany) Munich 1972		400 metre freestyle Novella Calligaris		3
(West Germany) Munich 1972			800 metre freestyle Novella Calligaris	3
(West Germany) Munich 1972			400 metre medley Novella Calligaris	3
(South Korea) Seoul 1988			400 metre medley Stefano Battistelli	1
(Spain) Barcelona 1992			400 metre medley Luca Sacchi	2
(Spain) Barcelona 1992			200 metre backstroke Stefano Battistelli	2
(United States) Atlanta 1996			200 metre backstrokee Emanuele Merisi	1
(Australia) Sydney 2000	100 metre breaststroke Domenico Fioravanti			6
(Australia) Sydney 2000	200 metre breaststroke Domenico Fioravanti		200 metre breaststroke Davide Rummolo	6
(Australia) Sydney 2000	200 metre medley Massimiliano Rosolino			6
(Australia) Sydney 2000			200 metre freestyle Massimiliano Rosolino	6
(Australia) Sydney 2000		400 metre freestyle Massimiliano Rosolino		6
(Greece) Athens 2004			4 × 200 metre freestyle relay Emiliano Brembilla; Massimiliano Rosolino; Simone Cercato; Filippo Magnini; Federico Cappellazzo; Matteo Pelliciari	2
(Greece) Athens 2004		200 metre freestyle Federica Pellegrini		2
(China) Beijing 2008	200 metre freestyle Federica Pellegrini			2
(China) Beijing 2008		800 metre freestyle Alessia Filippi		2
(Brazil) Rio de Janeiro 2016	1500 metre freestyle Gregorio Paltrinieri		1500 metre freestyle Gabriele Detti	3
(Brazil) Rio de Janeiro 2016			400 metre freestyle Gabriele Detti	3
(Japan) Tokyo 2020		800 metre freestyle Gregorio Paltrinieri		6
(Japan) Tokyo 2020			100 metre breaststroke Nicolò Martinenghi	6
(Japan) Tokyo 2020			200 metre butterfly Federico Burdisso	6
(Japan) Tokyo 2020		4 x 100 metre freestyle relay Alessandro Miressi; Thomas Ceccon; Lorenzo Zazzeri; Manuel Frigo; Santo Condorelli		6
(Japan) Tokyo 2020			4 x 100 metre mixed relay Thomas Ceccon; Nicolò Martinenghi; Federico Burdisso; Alessandro Miressi	6
(Japan) Tokyo 2020			800 metre freestyle Simona Quadarella	6
(France) Paris 2024		1500 metre freestyle Gregorio Paltrinieri		5
(France) Paris 2024	100 metre breaststroke Nicolò Martinenghi			5
(France) Paris 2024	100 metre backstroke Thomas Ceccon			5
(France) Paris 2024			4 x 100 metre freestyle relay Alessandro Miressi; Thomas Ceccon; Lorenzo Zazzeri; Manuel Frigo; Santo Condorelli	5
(France) Paris 2024			800 metre freestyle Gregorio Paltrinieri	5
	7	7	17	31

=== Open water ===
Open water swimming was introduced at Beijing 2008.

Edition	Gold	Silver	Bronze	Total
(United Kingdom) London 2012			10 km Martina Grimaldi	1
(Brazil) Rio de Janeiro 2016		10 km Rachele Bruni		1
(Japan) Tokyo 2020			10 km Gregorio Paltrinieri	1
	0	1	2	3

== World Championships ==
=== Long course ===
Update after Doha 2024.

Edition	1st place, gold medalist(s)	2nd place, silver medalist(s)	3rd place, bronze medalist(s)	Total	Rank
(Socialist Federal Republic of Yugoslavia) 1973 Belgrade	1	0	2	3	5
(Colombia) 1975 Cali	0	0	1	1	11
(West Germany) 1978 West Berlin	0	0	0	0	-
(Ecuador) 1982 Guayaquil	0	0	1	1	12
(Spain) 1986 Madrid	0	2	0	2	8
(Australia) 1991 Perth	1	1	4	6	7
(Italy) 1994 Rome	0	0	1	1	15
(Australia) 1998 Perth	0	2	0	2	14
(Japan) 2001 Fukuoka	2	2	2	6	7
(Spain) 2003 Barcelona	0	0	1	1	21
(Canada) 2005 Montreal	1	2	0	3	8
(Australia) 2007 Melbourne	1	1	4	6	7
(Italy) 2009 Rome	3	0	1	4	5
(China) 2011 Shanghai	2	3	0	5	6
(Spain) 2013 Barcelona	0	1	1	2	17
(Russia) 2015 Kazan	1	3	1	5	9
(Hungary) 2017 Budapest	3	0	3	6	6
(South Korea) 2019 Gwangju	3	2	3	8	5
(Hungary) 2022 Budapest	5	2	2	9	3
(Japan) 2023 Fukuoka	1	4	1	6	10
(Qatar) 2024 Doha	2	5	5	12	5
	26	30	33	89	

=== Short course ===
Update after 2022 Melbourne.

Edition	1st place, gold medalist(s)	2nd place, silver medalist(s)	3rd place, bronze medalist(s)	Total	Rank
(Spain) 1993 Palma de Mallorca	0	1	0	1	13
(Brazil) 1995 Rio de Janeiro	0	0	0	0	-
(Sweden) 1997 Gothenburg	0	0	0	0	-
1999 Hong Kong	0	1	1	2	18
(Greece) 2000 Athens	0	1	2	3	13
(Russia) 2002 Moscow	0	0	0	0	-
(United States) 2004 Indianapolis	0	1	0	1	12
(China) 2006 Shanghai	2	7	3	12	6
(United Kingdom) 2008 Manchester	0	2	2	4	13
(United Arab Emirates) 2010 Dubai	0	1	1	2	17
(Turkey) 2012 Istanbul	2	2	0	4	6
(Qatar) 2014 Doha	1	2	3	6	13
(Canada) 2016 Windsor	1	4	2	7	11
(China) 2018 Hangzhou	0	3	4	7	13
(United Arab Emirates) 2021 Abu Dhabi	5	5	6	16	3
(Australia) 2022 Melbourne	5	6	5	16	3

== European Championships ==
This table is of swimming pool events, it excludes open water events. See LEN official report.

Update after day 7 (17 August) of the Rome 2022 swimming program (complete).

Edition	Men			Women			Total				rank
Edition	Gold medal	Silver medal	Bronze medal	Gold medal	Silver medal	Bronze medal	Gold medal	Silver medal	Bronze medal		
(Hungary) Budapest 1926	0	0	0	0	0	0	0	0	0	0	
(Italy) Bologna 1927	0	1	0	0	0	0	0	1	0	1	6
(France) Paris 1931	0	1	3	0	0	0	0	1	3	4	7
(Germany) Magdeburg 1934	0	2	2	0	0	0	0	2	2	4	
(United Kingdom) London 1938	0	0	0	0	0	0	0	0	0	0	
(Monaco) Monte Carlo 1947	0	0	0	0	0	0	0	0	0	0	
(Austria) Vienna 1950	0	0	0	0	0	0	0	0	0	0	
(Italy) Turin 1954	0	1	0	0	0	0	0	1	0	1	7
(Hungary) Budapest 1958	1	2	2	0	0	0	1	2	2	5	4
(East Germany) Leipzig 1962	0	0	0	0	0	0	0	0	0	0	
(Netherlands) Utrecht 1966	0	0	0	0	0	0	0	0	0	0	
(Spain) Barcelona 1970	0	0	0	0	0	1	0	0	1	1	11
(Austria) Vienna 1974	0	0	0	0	1	1	0	1	1	2	8
(Sweden) Jönköping 1977	0	2	2	0	0	0	0	2	2	4	7
(Socialist Federal Republic of Yugoslavia) Split 1981	0	1	1	0	0	0	0	1	1	2	10
(Italy) Rome 1983	2	0	2	0	0	1	2	0	3	5	4
(Bulgaria) Sofia 1985	0	0	1	0	0	0	0	0	1	1	14
(France) Strasbourg 1987	0	1	1	0	2	0	0	3	1	4	8
(West Germany) Bonn 1989	4	0	2	0	1	3	4	1	5	10	2
(Greece) Athens 1991	1	2	5	0	0	2	1	2	7	10	8
(United Kingdom) Sheffield 1993	0	0	1	0	1	0	0	1	1	2	11
(Austria) Vienna 1995	0	0	2	0	1	0	0	1	2	3	13
(Spain) Sevilla 1997	2	3	0	0	0	0	2	3	0	5	3
(Turkey) Istanbul 1999	1	3	2	0	0	0	1	3	2	6	9
(Finland) Helsinki 2000	5	3	1	0	2	0	5	5	1	11	3
(Germany) Berlin 2002	4	5	2	0	0	0	4	5	2	11	3
(Spain) Madrid 2004	5	1	6	0	1	1	5	2	7	14	3
(Hungary) Budapest 2006	4	5	2	1	1	2	5	6	4	15	3
(Netherlands) Eindhoven 2008	1	4	3	3	1	1	4	5	4	13	3
(Hungary) Budapest 2010	1	0	3	1	0	1	2	0	4	6	8
(Hungary) Debrecen 2012	4	5	3	2	3	1	6	8	4	18	3
(Germany) Berlin 2014 ✓	2.5	1	5	2.5	0	4	5	1	9	15	4
(United Kingdom) London 2016 ✓	4	4	4	1	3	1	5	7	5	17	3
(United Kingdom) Glasgow 2018 ✓	2	3	6.5	4	2	4.5	6	5	11	22	3
(Hungary) Budapest 2021	0	5,5	8	5	3,5	5	5	9	13	27	3
(Italy) Rome 2022	8	7,5	5,5	5	5,5	3,5	13	13	9	35	1
Total	51.5	63	75	24.5	28	32	76	91	107	274	5

note 1: in italic to update.
note 2: Where it is reported half medal refers to those assigned in mixed relays from 2014 for the first time.

== Multiple medalists ==
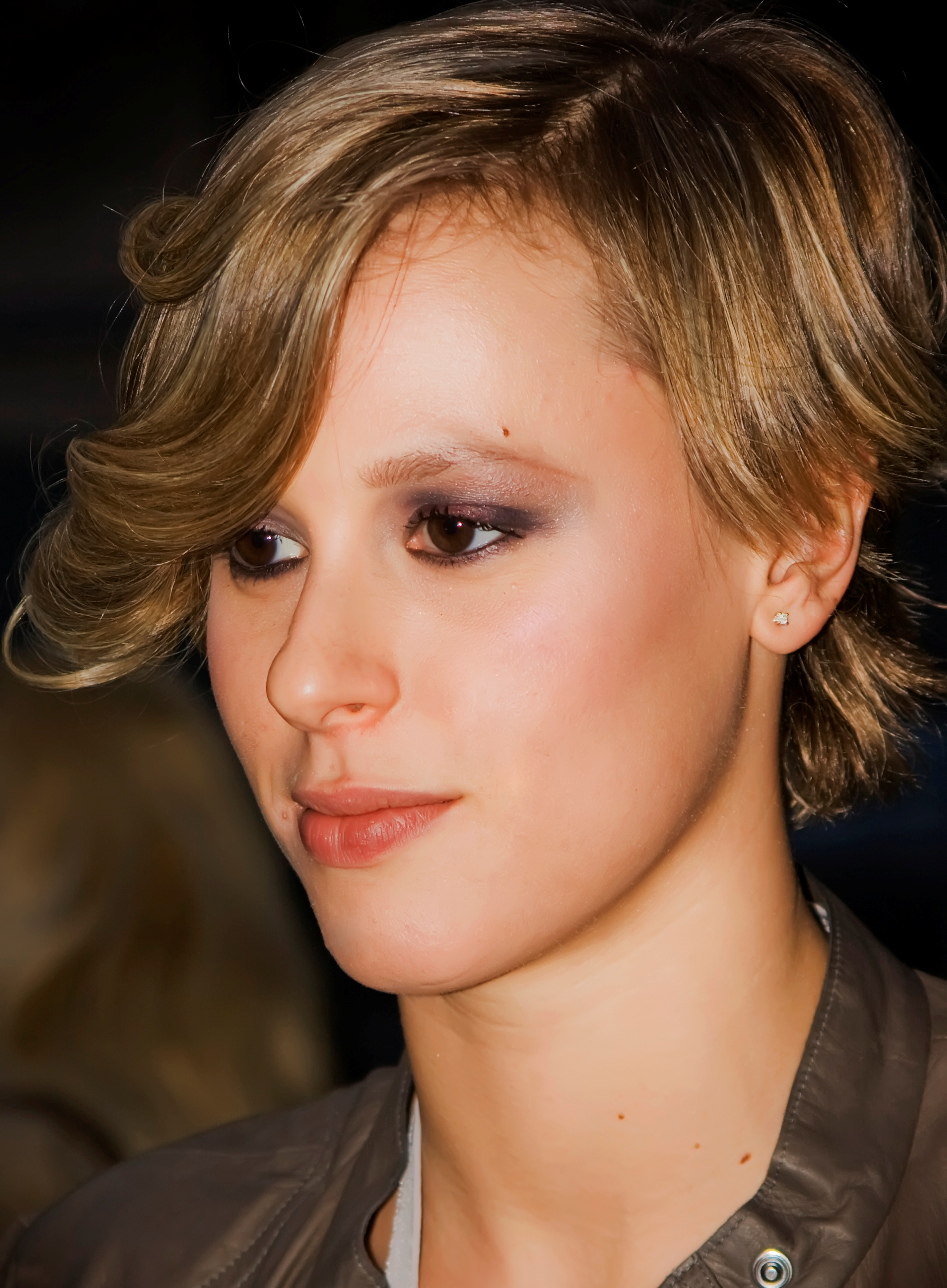
Federica Pellegrini, 33 individual medals.

Still active
Medals only in relay

Updated to Lublin 2025

=== Men ===
Paltrinieri open water medals are not included.

#	Swimmer	Olympics			World Ch. (LC)			World Ch. (SC)			European Ch. (LC)			European Ch. (SC)			Total			
#	Swimmer	Gold medal	Silver medal	Bronze medal	Gold medal	Silver medal	Bronze medal	Gold medal	Silver medal	Bronze medal	Gold medal	Silver medal	Bronze medal	Gold medal	Silver medal	Bronze medal	Gold medal	Silver medal	Bronze medal	
1	Massimiliano Rosolino	1	1	2	1	3	1	1	2	7	7	8	6	7	8	5	17	22	21	60
2	Filippo Magnini	0	0	1	2	1	1	2	5	2	9	5	5	8	7	5	21	18	14	53
3	Thomas Ceccon	1	1	2	3	4	2	4	2	4	4	4	4	4	3	2	16	14	14	44
4	Alessandro Miressi	0	1	2	1	3	2	6	3	4	3	2	6	0	9	1	10	18	15	43
5	Nicolò Martinenghi	1	0	2	2	5	1	2	5	3	5	2	3	5	3	2	15	15	11	41
6	Gregorio Paltrinieri	1	2	1	4	1	4	3	3	0	6	5	1	4	2	0	18	13	6	37
7	Marco Orsi	0	0	0	0	0	1	0	3	1	0	1	1	9	11	5	9	15	8	32
8	Fabio Scozzoli	0	0	0	0	2	0	1	1	2	3	2	3	8	3	5	12	8	10	30
9	Lorenzo Zazzeri	0	1	1	1	3	1	3	2	2	1	1	1	5	6	1	10	13	6	29
10	Luca Dotto	0	0	0	0	1	1	0	1	1	2	3	3	3	6	4	5	11	9	25

=== Women ===
#	Swimmer	Olympics			World Ch. (LC)			World Ch. (SC)			European Ch. (LC)			European Ch. (SC)			Total			
#	Swimmer	Gold medal	Silver medal	Bronze medal	Gold medal	Silver medal	Bronze medal	Gold medal	Silver medal	Bronze medal	Gold medal	Silver medal	Bronze medal	Gold medal	Silver medal	Bronze medal	Gold medal	Silver medal	Bronze medal	
1	Federica Pellegrini	1	1	0	6	4	1	1	2	5	7	6	7	7	4	6	22	17	19	58
2	Silvia Di Pietro	0	0	0	0	0	0	1	4	4	0	3	3	6	8	7	7	15	14	36
3	Simona Quadarella	0	0	1	3	3	2	0	2	1	11	1	1	4	6	1	18	12	6	36
4	Erika Ferraioli	0	0	0	0	0	0	0	2	3	1	4	2	3	1	4	4	7	9	20
5	Benedetta Pilato	0	0	0	1	2	3	0	1	1	2	3	1	2	4	0	5	10	5	20
6	Sara Curtis	0	0	0	0	0	0	1	0	0	1	2	3	3	4	2	5	6	5	16
7	Margherita Panziera	0	0	0	0	0	0	0	0	1	4	2	3	1	1	1	5	3	5	13
8	Alessia Filippi	0	1	0	1	1	1	0	1	0	3	0	2	3	1	2	4	3	5	12
9	Ilaria Bianchi	0	0	0	0	0	0	1	0	1	0	3	2	1	2	2	2	5	5	12
10	Novella Calligaris	0	1	2	1	0	2	-	-	-	0	1	2	-	-	-	1	2	6	9

=== Olympic Games ===
The list refers to individual and team events and include men and women (in pink color), sorted by number of individual titles.

#	Swimmer	Individual			Team			Total		
#	Swimmer	Gold medal	Silver medal	Bronze medal	Gold medal	Silver medal	Bronze medal	Gold medal	Silver medal	Bronze medal
1	Domenico Fioravanti	2	0	0	0	0	0	2	0	0
2	Gregorio Paltrinieri	1	2	1	0	0	0	1	2	1
3	Massimiliano Rosolino	1	1	1	0	0	1	1	1	2
4	Federica Pellegrini	1	1	0	0	0	0	1	1	0
5	Nicolò Martinenghi	1	0	1	0	0	1	1	0	2
6	Thomas Ceccon	1	0	0	0	1	2	1	1	2
7	Novella Calligaris	0	1	2	0	0	0	0	1	2
8	Alessia Filippi	0	1	0	0	0	0	0	1	0
9	Stefano Battistelli	0	0	2	0	0	0	0	0	2
10	Federico Burdisso	0	0	1	0	0	1	0	0	2
11	Simona Quadarella	0	0	1	0	0	0	0	0	1

== See also ==
- Italy at the Olympics
- Italy at the World Aquatics Championships
- Italy at the European Aquatics Championships
- Italy national diving team
- List of Italian records in swimming
- Swimming Summer Olympics medal table
- Swimming World Championships medal table
