= Marianne Aeschbacher =

French synchronized swimmer

Personal information
- Nationality: France
- Born: 10 December 1970 (age 55) Toulouse, France
- Height: 166 cm (5 ft 5 in)
- Weight: 50 kg (110 lb)

Sport
- Sport: Swimming
- Strokes: Synchronized swimming
- Club: C.N.O
Medal record
Synchronized swimming
Representing France
LEN European Aquatics Championships
Gold medal – first place	1987 Strasbourg	Team
Gold medal – first place	1989 Bonn	Team
Gold medal – first place	1989 Bonn	Duet
Silver medal – second place	1993 Sheffield	Solo
Silver medal – second place	1993 Sheffield	Duet
Silver medal – second place	1993 Sheffield	Team
Silver medal – second place	1995 Vienna	Solo
Silver medal – second place	1995 Vienna	Duet
Silver medal – second place	1995 Vienna	Team
- Updated on 22 May 2015

Marianne Aeschbacher (born 10 December 1970 in Toulouse) is a French former synchronized swimmer who competed in the 1992 and 1996 Summer Olympics.

== Career records ==
Solo
1992 Summer Olympics, Barcelona, 18th
1993 European Aquatics Championships, Sheffield, 2nd
1994 World Aquatics Championships, Rome, 6th
1995 European Aquatics Championships, Vienna, 2nd

Duet
1989 European Aquatics Championships, Bonn, 1st (with Karine Schuler)
1992 Summer Olympics, Barcelona, 5th (with Anne Capron)
1993 European Aquatics Championships, Sheffield, 2nd (with Céline Léveque)
1994 World Aquatics Championships, Rome, 4th (with Myriam Lignot)
1995 European Aquatics Championships, Vienna, 2nd (with Myriam Lignot)

Team
1987 European Aquatics Championships, Strasbourg, 1st
1989 European Aquatics Championships, Bonn, 1st
1993 European Aquatics Championships, Sheffield, 2nd
1995 European Aquatics Championships, Vienna, 2nd
1996 Summer Olympics, Atlanta, 5th
