= 2027 World Aquatics Men's Water Polo World Cup =

- League: FINA Water Polo World Cup
- Sport: Water polo
- Duration: 11 January – 28 February

Super Final

World Aquatics Water Polo World Cup seasons
- ← 2026 2028 →

The 2027 Men's World Aquatics Water Polo World Cup will be the 20th edition of the tournament. It will run from 11 January to 28 February 2027. The super final will be held in Athens, Greece.

The winner will qualify for the 2028 Summer Olympics.

== Format ==
There will be two divisions. The top-six teams of Division 1 and the top-two teams from Division 2 will compete in the super final. A win gives a team three points, a win after penalties two, a loss after penalties one and a loss after regular time zero points.

== Division 1 ==
Division 1
Tournament details
- Host country: Turkey
- Venue: 1 (in 1 host city)
- Dates: 11–16 January
- Teams: 8 (from 2 confederations)

Division 1 will be held in Istanbul, Turkey from 11 and 16 January 2027.

The teams are split into two pools of four teams, with the top two-teams forming a new group, same with the bottom two-teams. The top five teams advance to the super final along with the hosts, Greece.

All times are local (UTC+3).

=== Preliminary round ===
==== Group A ====
Pos	Team	Pld	W	PW	PL	L	GF	GA	GD	Pts	Qualification
1	Italy	0	0	0	0	0	0	0	0	0	Group C
1	Serbia	0	0	0	0	0	0	0	0	0	Group C
1	Greece	0	0	0	0	0	0	0	0	0	Group D
1	United States	0	0	0	0	0	0	0	0	0	Group D

First match(es) will be played: 11 January 2027. Source:
Rules for classification: 1) Points; 2) Head-to-head points; 3) Head-to-head goal difference; 4) Head-to-head goals scored; 5) Goal difference.

11 January 2027; 14:30	Italy	–	United States	Atakoy Olympic Pool Stadium, Istanbul

11 January 2027; 18:00	Serbia	–	Greece	Atakoy Olympic Pool Stadium, Istanbul

12 January 2027; 14:30	United States	–	Serbia	Atakoy Olympic Pool Stadium, Istanbul

12 January 2027; 18:00	Greece	–	Italy	Atakoy Olympic Pool Stadium, Istanbul

13 January 2027; 14:30	Italy	–	Serbia	Atakoy Olympic Pool Stadium, Istanbul

13 January 2027; 18:00	Greece	–	United States	Atakoy Olympic Pool Stadium, Istanbul

==== Group B ====
Pos	Team	Pld	W	PW	PL	L	GF	GA	GD	Pts	Qualification
1	Hungary	0	0	0	0	0	0	0	0	0	Group C
1	Croatia	0	0	0	0	0	0	0	0	0	Group C
1	Montenegro	0	0	0	0	0	0	0	0	0	Group D
1	Spain	0	0	0	0	0	0	0	0	0	Group D

First match(es) will be played: 11 January 2027. Source:
Rules for classification: 1) Points; 2) Head-to-head points; 3) Head-to-head goal difference; 4) Head-to-head goals scored; 5) Goal difference.

11 January 2027; 16:15	Hungary	–	Spain	Atakoy Olympic Pool Stadium, Istanbul

11 January 2027; 19:45	Croatia	–	Montenegro	Atakoy Olympic Pool Stadium, Istanbul

12 January 2027; 16:15	Spain	–	Croatia	Atakoy Olympic Pool Stadium, Istanbul

12 January 2027; 19:45	Montenegro	–	Hungary	Atakoy Olympic Pool Stadium, Istanbul

13 January 2027; 16:15	Hungary	–	Croatia	Atakoy Olympic Pool Stadium, Istanbul

13 January 2027; 19:45	Montenegro	–	Spain	Atakoy Olympic Pool Stadium, Istanbul

=== Second round ===
The points obtained against teams from the same preliminary group are carried over.

==== Group C ====
Pos	Team	Pld	W	PW	PL	L	GF	GA	GD	Pts	Qualification
1	A1	0	0	0	0	0	0	0	0	0	Super final
1	B1	0	0	0	0	0	0	0	0	0	Super final
1	A2	0	0	0	0	0	0	0	0	0	Super final
1	B2	0	0	0	0	0	0	0	0	0	Super final

First match(es) will be played: 14 January 2027. Source:
Rules for classification: 1) Points; 2) Head-to-head points; 3) Head-to-head goal difference; 4) Head-to-head goals scored; 5) Goal difference.

15 January 2027; 18:00	B1	–	A2	Atakoy Olympic Pool Stadium, Istanbul

15 January 2027; 19:45	A1	–	B2	Atakoy Olympic Pool Stadium, Istanbul

16 January 2027; 14:30	B2	–	A2	Atakoy Olympic Pool Stadium, Istanbul

16 January 2027; 16:15	A1	–	B1	Atakoy Olympic Pool Stadium, Istanbul

==== Group D ====
Pos	Team	Pld	W	PW	PL	L	GF	GA	GD	Pts	Qualification
1	A3	0	0	0	0	0	0	0	0	0	Super final
1	B3	0	0	0	0	0	0	0	0	0	Super final
1	A4	0	0	0	0	0	0	0	0	0	Super final
1	B4	0	0	0	0	0	0	0	0	0	Super final

First match(es) will be played: 14 January 2027. Source:
Rules for classification: 1) Points; 2) Head-to-head points; 3) Head-to-head goal difference; 4) Head-to-head goals scored; 5) Goal difference.

15 January 2027; 14:30	B3	–	A4	Atakoy Olympic Pool Stadium, Istanbul

15 January 2027; 16:15	A3	–	B4	Atakoy Olympic Pool Stadium, Istanbul

16 January 2027; 11:00	B4	–	A4	Atakoy Olympic Pool Stadium, Istanbul

16 January 2027; 12:45	A3	–	B3	Atakoy Olympic Pool Stadium, Istanbul

== Division 2 ==
Division 2
Tournament details
- Host country: Turkey
- Venue: 1 (in 1 host city)
- Dates: 18–24 January
- Teams: 20 (from 6 confederations)

Division 2 will be held in Istanbul, Turkey 18 and 24 January 2027.

The teams are sorted in one league phase, playing three games based on ranking. The top eight teams of the standings advance to the knockout stage, where the top two teams qualify for the super final.

=== League phase ===
Teams were ranked by average Tournament Performance Index (TPI) points, calculated using the margin of victory/defeat and the strength of opposition, before the other tiebreakers are used.

Pos	Team	Pld	W	PSW	PSL	L	GF	GA	GD	TPI	Qualification
1	Australia	0	0	0	0	0	0	0	0	0	Quarterfinals
2	Germany	0	0	0	0	0	0	0	0	0	Quarterfinals
3	France	0	0	0	0	0	0	0	0	0	Quarterfinals
4	Netherlands	0	0	0	0	0	0	0	0	0	Quarterfinals
5	Georgia	0	0	0	0	0	0	0	0	0	Quarterfinals
6	Canada	0	0	0	0	0	0	0	0	0	Quarterfinals
7	Ukraine	0	0	0	0	0	0	0	0	0	Quarterfinals
8	Japan	0	0	0	0	0	0	0	0	0	Quarterfinals
9	Russia	0	0	0	0	0	0	0	0	0	9–16th place quarterfinals
10	Romania	0	0	0	0	0	0	0	0	0	9–16th place quarterfinals
11	Brazil	0	0	0	0	0	0	0	0	0	9–16th place quarterfinals
12	China	0	0	0	0	0	0	0	0	0	9–16th place quarterfinals
13	Turkey (H)	0	0	0	0	0	0	0	0	0	9–16th place quarterfinals
14	Malta	0	0	0	0	0	0	0	0	0	9–16th place quarterfinals
15	Argentina	0	0	0	0	0	0	0	0	0	9–16th place quarterfinals
16	Singapore	0	0	0	0	0	0	0	0	0	9–16th place quarterfinals
17	South Africa	0	0	0	0	0	0	0	0	0	17–20th placement round
18	Portugal	0	0	0	0	0	0	0	0	0	17–20th placement round
19	Bulgaria	0	0	0	0	0	0	0	0	0	17–20th placement round
20	Poland	0	0	0	0	0	0	0	0	0	17–20th placement round

First match(es) will be played: 18 January 2027. Source:
Rules for classification: 1) Points; 2) Strength of opposition; 3) Head-to-head points; 4) Head-to-head goal difference; 5) Head-to-head goals scored; 6) Goal difference.
(H) Hosts

All times are local (UTC+3).

=== Day 1 ===
18 January 2027; 09:00	Canada	–	Brazil	Atakoy Olympic Pool Stadium, Istanbul

18 January 2027; 10:30	Ukraine	–	China	Atakoy Olympic Pool Stadium, Istanbul

18 January 2027; 12:00	Russia	–	Malta	Atakoy Olympic Pool Stadium, Istanbul

18 January 2027; 13:30	Romania	–	Argentina	Atakoy Olympic Pool Stadium, Istanbul

18 January 2027; 15:00	Australia	–	Singapore	Atakoy Olympic Pool Stadium, Istanbul

18 January 2027; 16:30	Germany	–	South Africa	Atakoy Olympic Pool Stadium, Istanbul

18 January 2027; 18:00	France	–	Portugal	Atakoy Olympic Pool Stadium, Istanbul

18 January 2027; 19:30	Japan	–	Turkey	Atakoy Olympic Pool Stadium, Istanbul

18 January 2027; 21:00	Netherlands	–	Bulgaria	Atakoy Olympic Pool Stadium, Istanbul

18 January 2027; 22:30	Georgia	–	Poland	Atakoy Olympic Pool Stadium, Istanbul

=== Day 2 ===
19 January 2027; 09:00	Romania	–	Singapore	Atakoy Olympic Pool Stadium, Istanbul

19 January 2027; 10:30	Canada	–	South Africa	Atakoy Olympic Pool Stadium, Istanbul

19 January 2027; 12:00	Ukraine	–	Portugal	Atakoy Olympic Pool Stadium, Istanbul

19 January 2027; 13:30	Japan	–	Bulgaria	Atakoy Olympic Pool Stadium, Istanbul

19 January 2027; 15:00	Russia	–	Poland	Atakoy Olympic Pool Stadium, Istanbul

19 January 2027; 16:30	Australia	–	China	Atakoy Olympic Pool Stadium, Istanbul

19 January 2027; 18:00	France	–	Malta	Atakoy Olympic Pool Stadium, Istanbul

19 January 2027; 19:30	Germany	–	Turkey	Atakoy Olympic Pool Stadium, Istanbul

19 January 2027; 21:00	Netherlands	–	Argentina	Atakoy Olympic Pool Stadium, Istanbul

19 January 2027; 22:30	Georgia	–	Brazil	Atakoy Olympic Pool Stadium, Istanbul

=== Day 3 ===
20 January 2027; 09:00	China	–	Bulgaria	Atakoy Olympic Pool Stadium, Istanbul

20 January 2027; 10:30	Malta	–	Singapore	Atakoy Olympic Pool Stadium, Istanbul

20 January 2027; 12:00	Argentina	–	South Africa	Atakoy Olympic Pool Stadium, Istanbul

20 January 2027; 13:30	Brazil	–	Portugal	Atakoy Olympic Pool Stadium, Istanbul

20 January 2027; 15:00	Netherlands	–	Canada	Atakoy Olympic Pool Stadium, Istanbul

20 January 2027; 16:30	Georgia	–	Ukraine	Atakoy Olympic Pool Stadium, Istanbul

20 January 2027; 18:00	Germany	–	Russia	Atakoy Olympic Pool Stadium, Istanbul

20 January 2027; 19:30	Turkey	–	Poland	Atakoy Olympic Pool Stadium, Istanbul

20 January 2027; 21:00	France	–	Georgia	Atakoy Olympic Pool Stadium, Istanbul

20 January 2027; 22:30	Australia	–	Japan	Atakoy Olympic Pool Stadium, Istanbul

=== Final phase ===
==== Bracket ====
Quarter-finals
22 January
1 Team 1
8 Team 8
22 January
4 Team 4
5 Team 5
22 January
2 Team 2
7 Team 7
22 January
3 Team 3
6 Team 8

Semi-finals
23 January
23 January

Final
24 January
Third place
24 January

Fifth place bracket

5–8th place semifinals
23 January
23 January

Fifth place
24 January
Seventh place
24 January

Ninth place bracket

9–16th place quarterfinals
22 January
9 Team 9
16 Team 16
22 January
12 Team 12
13 Team 13
22 January
10 Team 10
15 Team 15
22 January
11 Team 11
14 Team 14

9–12th place semifinals
23 January
23 January

Ninth place
24 January
Eleventh place
24 January

13th place bracket

13–16th place semifinals
23 January
23 January

13th place
24 January
15th place
24 January

==== 17–20th placement round ====
Pos	Team	Pld	W	PW	PL	L	GF	GA	GD	Pts
1	Team 17	0	0	0	0	0	0	0	0	0
1	Team 18	0	0	0	0	0	0	0	0	0
1	Team 19	0	0	0	0	0	0	0	0	0
1	Team 20	0	0	0	0	0	0	0	0	0

First match(es) will be played: 22 January 2027. Source:
Rules for classification: 1) Points; 2) Head-to-head points; 3) Head-to-head goal difference; 4) Head-to-head goals scored; 5) Goal difference.

22 January 2027	Team 20	–	Team 17	Atakoy Olympic Pool Stadium, Istanbul

22 January 2027	Team 18	–	Team 19	Atakoy Olympic Pool Stadium, Istanbul

23 January 2027	Team 18	–	Team 20	Atakoy Olympic Pool Stadium, Istanbul

23 January 2027	Team 17	–	Team 19	Atakoy Olympic Pool Stadium, Istanbul

24 January 2027	Team 19	–	Team 20	Atakoy Olympic Pool Stadium, Istanbul

24 January 2027	Team 17	–	Team 18	Atakoy Olympic Pool Stadium, Istanbul

==== 9–16th place quarterfinals ====
22 January 2027	Team 9	–	Team 16	Atakoy Olympic Pool Stadium, Istanbul

22 January 2027	Team 10	–	Team 15	Atakoy Olympic Pool Stadium, Istanbul

22 January 2027	Team 11	–	Team 14	Atakoy Olympic Pool Stadium, Istanbul

22 January 2027	Team 12	–	Team 13	Atakoy Olympic Pool Stadium, Istanbul

==== Quarterfinals ====
22 January 2027	Team 1	–	Team 8	Atakoy Olympic Pool Stadium, Istanbul

22 January 2027	Team 2	–	Team 7	Atakoy Olympic Pool Stadium, Istanbul

22 January 2027	Team 3	–	Team 6	Atakoy Olympic Pool Stadium, Istanbul

22 January 2027	Team 4	–	Team 5	Atakoy Olympic Pool Stadium, Istanbul

==== 13–16th place semifinals ====
23 January 2027	LQF1	–	LQF2	Atakoy Olympic Pool Stadium, Istanbul

23 January 2027	LQF3	–	LQF4	Atakoy Olympic Pool Stadium, Istanbul

==== 9–12th place semifinals ====
23 January 2027	WQF1	–	WQF2	Atakoy Olympic Pool Stadium, Istanbul

23 January 2027	WQF3	–	WQF4	Atakoy Olympic Pool Stadium, Istanbul

==== 5–8th place semifinals ====
23 January 2027	LQF1	–	LQF2	Atakoy Olympic Pool Stadium, Istanbul

23 January 2027	LQF3	–	LQF4	Atakoy Olympic Pool Stadium, Istanbul

==== Semifinals ====
23 January 2027	WQF1	–	WQF2	Atakoy Olympic Pool Stadium, Istanbul

23 January 2027	WQF3	–	WQF4	Atakoy Olympic Pool Stadium, Istanbul

==== 15th place game ====
24 January 2027	LSF1	–	LSF2	Atakoy Olympic Pool Stadium, Istanbul

==== 13th place game ====
24 January 2027	WSF1	–	WSF2	Atakoy Olympic Pool Stadium, Istanbul

==== Eleventh place game ====
24 January 2027	LSF1	–	LSF2	Atakoy Olympic Pool Stadium, Istanbul

==== Ninth place game ====
24 January 2027	WSF1	–	WSF2	Atakoy Olympic Pool Stadium, Istanbul

==== Seventh place game ====
24 January 2027	LSF1	–	LSF2	Atakoy Olympic Pool Stadium, Istanbul

==== Fifth place game ====
24 January 2027	WSF1	–	WSF2	Atakoy Olympic Pool Stadium, Istanbul

==== Third place game ====
24 January 2027	LSF1	–	LSF2	Atakoy Olympic Pool Stadium, Istanbul

==== Final ====
24 January 2027	WSF1	–	WSF2	Atakoy Olympic Pool Stadium, Istanbul

== Super final ==
Super final
Tournament details
- Host country: Greece
- Venue: 1 (in 1 host city)
- Dates: 25–28 February
- Teams: 8

The tournament will take place between 25 and 28 February 2027 in Athens, Greece.

Teams

- Greece

=== Bracket ===
Quarter-finals
25 February
25 February
25 February
25 February

Semi-finals
27 February
27 February

Final
28 February
Third place
28 February

Fifth place bracket

5–8th place semifinals
26 February
26 February

Fifth place
27 February
Seventh place
27 February

== Final standings ==
Rank	Team
1st place, gold medalist(s)	
2nd place, silver medalist(s)	
3rd place, bronze medalist(s)	
4	
5	
6	
7	
8	

Qualified for the 2028 Summer Olympics

== See also ==
- 2027 World Aquatics Women's Water Polo World Cup
