= Éva Riffet =

French synchronized swimmer

Personal information
- Born: December 5, 1974 (age 51) Paris, France

Sport
- Sport: Synchronised swimming
Medal record
Representing France
European Championships
Silver medal – second place	1993 Sheffield	Team
Silver medal – second place	1995 Vienna	Team
Silver medal – second place	1997 Seville	Team

Éva Riffet (born 5 December 1974) is a French former synchronized swimmer who competed in the 1996 Summer Olympics.
