= Cinthia Bouhier =

French former synchronized swimmer

Personal information
- Born: January 24, 1979 (age 47) Angers, France

Sport
- Sport: Synchronised swimming
Medal record
Representing France
European Championships
Silver medal – second place	1999 Istanbul	Team
Bronze medal – third place	2000 Helsinki	Team

Cinthia Bouhier (born 24 January 1979) is a French former synchronized swimmer who competed in the 2000 Summer Olympics.

She was a performer with the Cirque du Soleil production "O" at the Bellagio Hotel & Casino Las Vegas, NV from 2004 to 2011.
