= Imre Lengyel =

Hungarian diver

Personal information
- Nationality: Hungarian
- Born: 24 April 1977 (age 49)

Sport
- Sport: Diving
Medal record
Men's diving
Representing Hungary
European Championships
Silver medal – second place	1999 Istanbul	3 m springboard
Silver medal – second place	2002 Helsinki	10 m platform
Silver medal – second place	2002 Helsinki	10 m synchro
Universiade
Gold medal – first place	1997 Sicily	1 m springboard
Gold medal – first place	1997 Sicily	3 m springboard
Bronze medal – third place	2001 Beijing	1 m springboard

Imre Lengyel (born 24 April 1977) is a Hungarian former diver who competed in the 1996 Summer Olympics and in the 2000 Summer Olympics. Studied at University of Miami 1998 – 2003 and was a Cirque du Soleil performer.

As of 2023, Imre is one of the head diving coaches at Metro Area Dive Club in North Bethesda, Maryland.
