= Vladimir Timoshinin =

Russian diver (1970–2023)

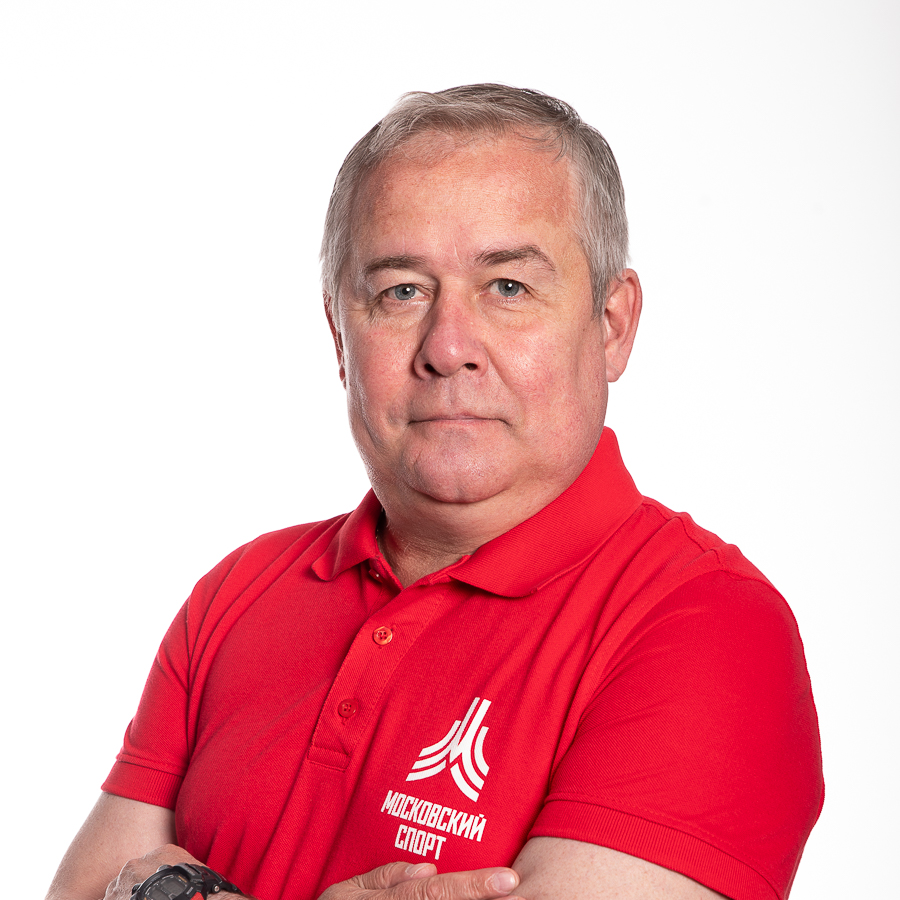
- Timoshinin in 2023

Personal information
- Born: 12 July 1970 Moscow, Russian SFSR, Soviet Union
- Died: 15 August 2023 (aged 53)

Sport
- Sport: Diving
Medal record
Men's diving
Representing Russia
World Championships
Bronze medal – third place	1994 Rome	10 m platform
European Championships
Gold medal – first place	1995 Vienna	10 m platform
Silver medal – second place	1999 Istanbul	10 m synchro
Representing the Soviet Union
European Championships
Gold medal – first place	1991 Athens	10 m platform
Bronze medal – third place	1989 Bonn	10 m platform

Vladimir Alexandrovich Timoshinin (Russian: Владимир Александрович Тимошинин; 12 July 1970 – 15 August 2023) was a Russian diver who won the gold medal in the men's 10 m platform at the 1991 European Championships in Athens, Greece.

Timoshinin represented the Soviet Union at the 1988 Summer Olympics, and Russia at the 1996 Summer Olympics (Atlanta, Georgia). He was affiliated with the Central Sport Klub Army in Moscow during his career.

His daughter is Yulia Timoshinina. Vladimir Timoshinin died on 15 August 2023, at the age of 53.

== Sources ==
- sports-reference
