= Delphine Maréchal =

French synchronized swimmer

Personal information
- Born: September 21, 1972 (age 53) Aix-en-Provence, France

Sport
- Sport: Synchronised swimming
Medal record
Representing France
European Championships
Silver medal – second place	1991 Athens	Team
Silver medal – second place	1993 Sheffield	Team
Silver medal – second place	1997 Seville	Team

Délphine Maréchal (born 21 September 1972) is a French former synchronized swimmer who competed in the 1996 Summer Olympics.
