= Jan Hempel =

German diver

Personal information
- Born: 21 August 1971 (age 54) Dresden, East Germany
Medal record
Men's diving
Representing Germany
Olympic Games
Silver medal – second place	1996 Atlanta	10 m platform
Bronze medal – third place	2000 Sydney	Platform synchro
World Championships
Silver medal – second place	1998 Perth	Platform synchro
Bronze medal – third place	1998 Perth	10 m platform
European Championships
Representing East Germany
Silver medal – second place	1987 Strasbourg	10 m platform
Silver medal – second place	1989 Bonn	10 m platform
Bronze medal – third place	1989 Bonn	3 m springboard
Representing Germany
Gold medal – first place	1993 Sheffield	3 m springboard
Gold medal – first place	1997 Seville	10 m platform
Gold medal – first place	1997 Seville	Platform synchro
Gold medal – first place	1999 Istanbul	Platform synchro
Silver medal – second place	1995 Vienna	3 m springboard
Silver medal – second place	1995 Vienna	10 m platform
Bronze medal – third place	1993 Sheffield	10 m platform

Jan Hempel (born 21 August 1971) is a German diver who competed at the 1988, 1992, 1996, and the 2000 Summer Olympics, winning two Olympic medals. Hempel won a silver in 10 m Platform and a bronze medal in 10 m synchronized platform. He also competed on the 3m springboard, scoring "the second best dive of all time" in Vienna in 1993.

== Olympic career ==
=== 1988 ===
Hempel made his Olympic debut at age 17 in Seoul, where he placed fifth.

=== 1992 ===
Hempel returned to the Olympics in Barcelona, but again did not medal, placing fourth.

=== 1996 ===
The third time was charm, as Hempel won silver in the 10 m platform, scoring 663.27. He saved his toughest dive for last. He nailed the back 1 1/2 somersault with 4 1/2 twists from the free position, earning 92.88 points. It was one of the two dives out of the 72 in the finals with a 3.6 degree of difficulty.

=== 2000 ===
In the inaugural men's 10 m synchronized platform event, Hempel, now 29, with partner Heiko Meyer won the bronze medal at the Sydney 2000 Games, earning Hempel his second medal in four Olympic appearances.

Meyer and first-time Olympian Heiko Meyer began training together in 1998 and won the bronze medal at the World Championships later that year. The pair also won the event at the 1999 European Championships.

Despite these achievements, Hempel came into the 2000 Games with modest expectations. Hempel stated, "If you had asked us before the competition, we wouldn't have thought we were a chance for a medal." However, the team pulled off a solid performance on the program's most difficult dive, a back 3 1/2 somersault tuck and reverse 3 1/2 somersault tuck, scoring 78.54. Hempel continued, "It has the most risk but it paid off for us."

== Other appearances ==
=== European Diving Championships ===
In the European Diving Championships, Hempel won silver in 1987 in Strasbourg, France, bronze in 1989 in Bonn, Germany, gold in 1993 in Sheffield, England, and silver in 1995 in Vienna, Austria.

In 1997 in Seville, Spain, Hempel finally won a European highboard diving gold 10 years after taking the first of three silvers on the 10-meter board.

Hempel had been suffering from influenza for three days and considered pulling out of the competition. But he decided against it and was rewarded with the gold. "I'm happy it worked out at the sixth attempt", said Hempel. During the competition, he scored a rare perfect 10 mark.

After taking the silver in 1987, 1989 and 1995 and bronze in 1993, he had finally added a highboard gold to the European three-meter springboard gold he won in 1993.

At the 2003 Arena Diving Champions Cup in Stockholm, Sweden, Hempel, now 32, was described as the man "who wrote diving history", citing the second best dive of all time in the Diving Champions Cup 3m finals performing a back 1 1/2 somersault with 3 1/2 twists in Vienna 1993, for a fantastic 87.36 points.

=== Synchronized diving ===
With Meyer, the synchronized pair continued to compete in the event at the World Championships, through at least 2001. They also competed separately on the men's 10 m platform. Hempel placed 4th at the 2001 Goodwill Games.

== Personal life ==
Hempel is a father of two. In summer of 2022, he was diagnosed with Alzheimer's disease.

== Sexual abuse allegations against coach ==
In August 2022, Hempel revealed that his long-term coach Werner Langer sexually abused him over the course of 14 years, commenting: "I was abused by my coach. He never missed a moment to give free rein to his desires... I just know that in the end I let him get away with it, because he would say things like: 'If you do that, you'll have the afternoon off.'" When he finally informed the German Swimming Association (DSV) they relieved the coach from duty but did not make the reason public or bring criminal charges.

In March 2023, media reported that Hempel was suing the DSV for compensation.

== See also ==
- Diving at the 1996 Summer Olympics - Men's 10 metre platform
- Diving at the 2000 Summer Olympics – Men's synchronized 10 metre platform
