= José Miguel Gil =

Spanish diver (born 1971)

Personal information
- Nationality: Spanish
- Born: 28 February 1971 (age 55) Madrid, Spain

Sport
- Sport: Diving
Medal record
Men's diving
Representing Spain
European Championships
Gold medal – first place	1999 Istanbul	1 m springboard
Silver medal – second place	2002 Berlin	1 m springboard
Bronze medal – third place	2000 Helsinki	3 m synchro

José Miguel Gil (born 28 February 1971) is a Spanish diver. He competed at the 1988, 1992, 1996 and the 2000 Summer Olympics.
