= Christina Thalassinidou =

Soviet-Greek synchronized swimmer

Personal information
- Nationality: Greece
- Born: 31 July 1970 (age 55) Tbilisi, Georgian SSR, Soviet Union
- Height: 1.72 m (5 ft 8 in)
- Weight: 53 kg (117 lb)

Sport
- Sport: Swimming
- Strokes: Synchronised swimming
- Coach: Natalia Mashchuk
Medal record
Synchronised swimming
European Championships
Representing Soviet Union
Silver medal – second place	1987 Strasbourg	Women's team
Gold medal – first place	1989 Bonn	Solo
Silver medal – second place	1989 Bonn	Women's team
Representing Greece
Silver medal – second place	1991 Athens	Solo
Bronze medal – third place	1995 Vienna	Solo
Bronze medal – third place	2004 Madrid	Combination

Christina Thalassinidou (born 31 July 1970) is a Soviet and later Greek former synchronized swimmer. She competed in the 1988, 1992, 2000, and 2004 Summer Olympics.

She was named the Greek Female Athlete of the Year for 1991.
