= Zhu Jinhong =

Chinese diver

Personal information
- Nationality: Chinese
- Born: 24 November 1976 (age 49)

Sport
- Sport: Diving
Medal record
Women's diving
Representing China
Universiade
Gold medal – first place	1997 Sicily	3 m springboard

Zhu Jinhong (simplified Chinese: 朱金红; traditional Chinese: 朱金紅; pinyin: Zhū Jīnhóng; born 24 November 1976) is a Chinese diver. She competed in the women's 10 metre platform event at the 1992 Summer Olympics.
