= Valery Statsenko =

Soviet and Russian diver

Personal information
- Born: 15 August 1968 Kyiv, Ukrainian SSR, Soviet Union
- Died: 29 August 2017 (aged 49) Moscow, Russia

Sport
- Sport: Diving
Medal record
Representing the Soviet Union
European Championships
Silver medal – second place	1989 Bonn	1 m springboard

Valery Statsenko (Russian: Валерий Стаценко, 15 August 1968 – 29 August 2017) was a Soviet and Russian diver who won a silver medal in the 1m springboard at the 1989 European Aquatics Championships. He also competed in the 3m springboard at the 1992 and 1996 Summer Olympics and finished in eighth and ninth place, respectively.

In 1991 Statsenko graduated from the Kyiv State Institute of Physical Education. After retiring from competitive diving, he worked as a diving coach in Moscow. He was an Honored Coach of Russia. In 1998–2004 among his students was Svetlana Timoshinina.
