= Matjaž Kozelj =

Slovenian swimmer (born 1970)

Matjaž Koželj
Personal information
- Full name: Matjaž Koželj
- Nationality: Slovenia
- Born: 12 March 1970 Maribor, Slovenia, Yugoslavia
- Died: August 2026 (aged 56)

Sport
- Sport: Swimming
- Strokes: Butterfly
- Club: Branik Maribor
Medal record
Men's swimming
Representing Yugoslavia
European Championships (LC)
Bronze medal – third place	1989 Bonn	200 m butterfly

Matjaž Koželj (12 March 1970 – August 2026) was a swimmer from Slovenia. He competed at the 1992 Summer Olympics in the 100 m and 200 m butterfly events, but did not reach the finals.
