= Chiara Cassin =

Italian former synchronized swimmer

Personal information
- Born: January 13, 1978 (age 48) Mestre, Italy

Sport
- Sport: Synchronised swimming
Medal record
Representing Italy
European Championships
Silver medal – second place	2000 Helsinki	Team
Bronze medal – third place	1997 Seville	Team
Bronze medal – third place	1999 Istanbul	Team

Chiara Cassin (born 13 January 1978) is an Italian former synchronized swimmer who competed in the 2000 Summer Olympics.

== Biography ==
Born in Mestre in 1978, in 2000, she won silver in the team competition at the European Championships in Helsinki, finishing behind Russia, while in 1997 and 1999 she won bronze in the same competition in Seville and Istanbul, in both cases behind Russia and France.

At the age of 22, he took part in the Sydney 2000 Olympic Games, in the team competition with Ballan, Bianchi, Brunetti, Cecconi, Dominici, Lucchini and Porchetto, arriving in 6th place with 95,177 points (32,993 in the technical and 62,184 in the free).

In the same year 2000 she was awarded the title of Knight of the Order of Merit of the Italian Republic.
