= Heiko Meyer =

German diver (born 1976)

Personal information
- Born: 2 December 1976 (age 49)
Medal record
Men's diving
Representing Germany
Olympic Games
Bronze medal – third place	2000 Sydney	10 m synchro
European Championships
Gold medal – first place	1999 Istanbul	10 m synchro
Gold medal – first place	2002 Berlin	10 m platform
Silver medal – second place	1999 Istanbul	10 m platform
Silver medal – second place	2000 Helsinki	10 m platform
Silver medal – second place	2004 Madrid	10 m platform
Silver medal – second place	2004 Madrid	10 m synchro
Silver medal – second place	2006 Budapest	10 m platform
Silver medal – second place	2006 Budapest	10 m synchro
Bronze medal – third place	1997 Seville	10 m platform

Heiko Meyer (born 2 December 1976 in Dresden, Sachsen) is a German diver who competed in the 2000 Summer Olympics. He won a bronze medal with Jan Hempel in the men's 10 m platform synchronized event.
