= Darya Shmeleva =

Russian swimmer

Personal information
- Born: 28 May 1976 (age 50)
- Height: 1.75 m (5 ft 9 in)
- Weight: 61 kg (134 lb)

Sport
- Sport: Swimming
- Club: CSKA Volgograd
Medal record
Women's swimming
Representing Russia
European Championships
Silver medal – second place	1993 Sheffield	200 m medley
Silver medal – second place	1993 Sheffield	400 m medley

Darya Viktorovna Shmelyova (Russian: Дарья Викторовна Шмелёва; born 28 May 1976) is a retired Russian swimmer who won silver medals in the 200 m and 400 m medley at the 1993 European Aquatics Championships. She competed in the same events at the 1996 Summer Olympics and 1991 and 1995 European championships, but finished outside the medals.

In early 1997 she married the Russian swimmer Alexander Popov, and has since lived with him for years in Australia, Switzerland and Russia. They have two sons, Vladimir (b. 1997) and Anton (b. 2000), and a daughter, Mia (b. 22 December 2010).
