= Joakim Andersson (diver) =

Swedish diver

Personal information
- Born: 9 September 1971 (age 54) Jönköping, Sweden
Medal record
Men's diving
Representing Sweden
European Championships
Silver medal – second place	1991 Athens	3 m springboard
Silver medal – second place	1993 Sheffield	1 m springboard
Silver medal – second place	1995 Vienna	1 m springboard
Bronze medal – third place	1993 Sheffield	3 m springboard

Arne Joakim Andersson (born 9 September 1971) is a retired diver from Sweden. He won four medals (three silver, one bronze) at the European Championships in the early 1990s.

Andersson represented Sweden in three consecutive Summer Olympics, starting in 1988 (Seoul, South Korea). He was affiliated with the Jönköpings Simsällskap during his career.
