= Alice Dominici =

Italian synchronized swimmer

Personal information
- Born: 3 April 1975 (age 51) Imperia, Italy

Sport
- Sport: Synchronised swimming
Medal record
Representing Italy
European Championships
Silver medal – second place	2000 Helsinki	Team
Bronze medal – third place	1999 Istanbul	Team

Alice Dominici (born 3 April 1975) is an Italian former synchronized swimmer who competed in the 2000 Summer Olympics.
