= Diving at the 2000 Summer Olympics – Men's synchronized 10 metre platform =

Men's synchronized 10 metre platform at the Games of the XXVII Olympiad
- Date: 23 September
- Competitors: 16 from 8 nations

Medalists
1st place, gold medalist(s)		Dmitri Sautin, Igor Lukashin	Russia
2nd place, silver medalist(s)		Hu Jia, Tian Liang	China
3rd place, bronze medalist(s)		Jan Hempel, Heiko Meyer	Germany

The men's synchronized 10 metre platform was one of eight diving events included in the Diving at the 2000 Summer Olympics programme and one of the newest four events since 1924.

The competition was held as an outright final on 23 September. Each pair of divers performed five dives freely chosen from the five diving groups, with two dives limited to a 2.0 degree of difficulty and the others without limitation. Divers could perform different dives during the same dive if both presented the same difficulty degree. The final ranking was determined by the score attained by the pair after all five dives had been performed.

== Results ==
Rank	Nation	Dives					Total
Rank	Nation	1	2	3	4	5	Total
1st place, gold medalist(s)	Russia; Dmitri Sautin; Igor Lukashin	58.20	52.80	82.80	83.52	87.72	365.04
2nd place, silver medalist(s)	China; Hu Jia; Tian Liang	55.20	53.40	88.32	74.70	87.12	358.74
3rd place, bronze medalist(s)	Germany; Jan Hempel; Heiko Meyer	52.80	53.40	78.30	75.84	78.54	338.88
4	Great Britain; Leon Taylor; Peter Waterfield	48.60	52.20	77.22	77.52	79.80	335.34
5	Australia; Mathew Helm; Robert Newbery	52.80	49.20	69.30	76.80<	85.14	333.24
6	Ukraine; Oleksandr Skrypnik; Roman Volod'kov	51.00	50.40	77.22	78.72	74.88	332.22
7	United States; David Pichler; Mark Ruiz	52.80	52.20	71.10	76.23	69.36	321.69
8	France; Gilles Emptoz-Lacote; Fréderic Piérre	49.80	51.60	72.00	65.70	75.84	314.94

== Sources ==
- Sydney Organising Committee for the Olympic Games (SOCOG) (2001). Official Report of the XXVII Olympiad - Volume Three: Results (Diving) (pdf) (in English and French). Sydney, New South Wales: Sydney Organising Committee for the Olympic Games (SOCOG). pp. 58–61. ISBN 0-9579616-1-8. OCLC 49687523.
