= Nicola Kennedy =

British swimmer

Personal information
- Nationality: British
- Born: 20 August 1969 (age 56) Stratford-upon-Avon, Warwickshire
- Height: 1.72 m (5 ft 7 1/2 in)

Sport
- Sport: Swimming
- Club: Avon Neptunes, Nova Centurion
Medal record
Representing United Kingdom
Bronze medal – third place	1993 Sheffield	4 x 100 medley

Nicola Kennedy (born 20 August 1969), also known by her married name Nicola Goodwin, is a former England and Great Britain butterfly and freestyle swimmer.

== Early life ==
She attended the University of Nottingham, and trained with Nova Centurion.

== Swimming career ==
Nicola represented Great Britain at the European Swimming Championships in Sheffield in 1991 where she won a bronze medal in the 4 × 100 m medley relay alongside Karen Pickering, Kathy Osher and Jaime King.

She was captain of the swimming team at the World Student Games in 1991, coming 6th in the 50m free and the only female swimming finalist.

== National championships ==
She was the British Swimming Champion for the Women's 50m Free in 1987 (Crystal Palace) when she was aged 18.

Nicola was also the British Swimming Champion for the Women's 50m Fly in 1991 (Leeds). In this year she was also part of the winning Nova Centurion team in the Women's 4 × 100 m freestyle team and the Women's 4 × 100 m Medley relay team. She was also runner up in the Women's 100m Fly in 1991 (Leeds), 1993 (Sheffield) and 1994 (Crystal Palace)
