= Odile Arboles-Souchon =

French diver (born 1975)

Personal information
- Nationality: French
- Born: 23 January 1975 (age 51) Madrid, Spain

Sport
- Sport: Diving
Medal record
Women's diving
Representing France
European Championships
Silver medal – second place	1997 Seville	10 m synchro
Bronze medal – third place	1999 Istanbul	3 m synchro
Bronze medal – third place	1999 Istanbul	10 m synchro

Odile Arboles-Souchon (born 23 January 1975) is a French diver. She competed in two events at the 2000 Summer Olympics.
