= Sylvain Cros =

French swimmer (born 1980)

Personal information
- Born: June 2, 1980 (age 46) Clermont-Ferrand, France

Sport
- Sport: Swimming
Medal record
Representing France
European Championships (LC)
Bronze medal – third place	1999 Istanbul	1500 m freestyle

Sylvain Cros (born 2 June 1980) is a long-distance freestyle swimmer from France, who won the bronze medal in the men's individual 1500 metres freestyle event at the 1999 European Championships in Istanbul. He has won twenty one French titles since 1998.
