= Roberta Farinelli =

Italian former synchronized swimmer

Personal information
- Born: 6 February 1975 (age 51) Rome, Italy

Sport
- Sport: Synchronised swimming
Medal record
Representing Italy
European Championships
Bronze medal – third place	1991 Athens	Team competition
Bronze medal – third place	1993 Sheffield	Team competition
Bronze medal – third place	1995 Vienna	Team competition

Roberta Farinelli (born 6 February 1975) is an Italian former synchronized swimmer who competed in the 1996 Summer Olympics.
