= Jacqueline Jacob =

German swimmer

Sport
- Sport: Swimming
- Club: SC Magdeburg
Medal record
Swimming
Representing East Germany
European Championships
Gold medal – first place	1989 Bonn	4×100 m medley
Silver medal – second place	1989 Bonn	100 m butterfly
Silver medal – second place	1989 Bonn	200 m butterfly

Jacqueline Jacob (also Jakob) is a retired German butterfly swimmer who won one gold and two silver medals at the 1989 European Aquatics Championships.
