= Charlotte Massardier =

French synchronized swimmer

Personal information
- Born: 12 October 1975 (age 51) Saint-Étienne, France

Sport
- Sport: Synchronised swimming
Medal record
Representing France
European Championships
Silver medal – second place	1993 Sheffield	Team
Silver medal – second place	1995 Vienna	Team
Silver medal – second place	1997 Seville	Team
Silver medal – second place	1999 Istanbul	Team
Bronze medal – third place	2000 Helsinki	Team

Charlotte Massardier (born 12 October 1975) is a French former synchronized swimmer who competed in the 1996 Summer Olympics and in the 2000 Summer Olympics.
