= Martin Herrmann =

German swimmer

Personal information
- Born: 20 March 1970 (age 56) Cologne, West Germany
- Height: 1.92 m (6 ft 4 in)
- Weight: 74 kg (163 lb)

Sport
- Sport: Swimming
- Club: SV Rhenania Köln
Medal record
Men's swimming
Representing West Germany
European Championships
Silver medal – second place	1989 Bonn	4×200 m freestyle
Bronze medal – third place	1989 Bonn	100 m butterfly

Martin Herrmann (born 20 March 1970) is a retired German swimmer who won two medals at the 1989 European Aquatics Championships. He also competed in the 100 m and 200 m butterfly at the 1988 and 1992 Summer Olympics, he placed 11th in the 100 m butterfly.
