= Ute Wetzig =

German diver

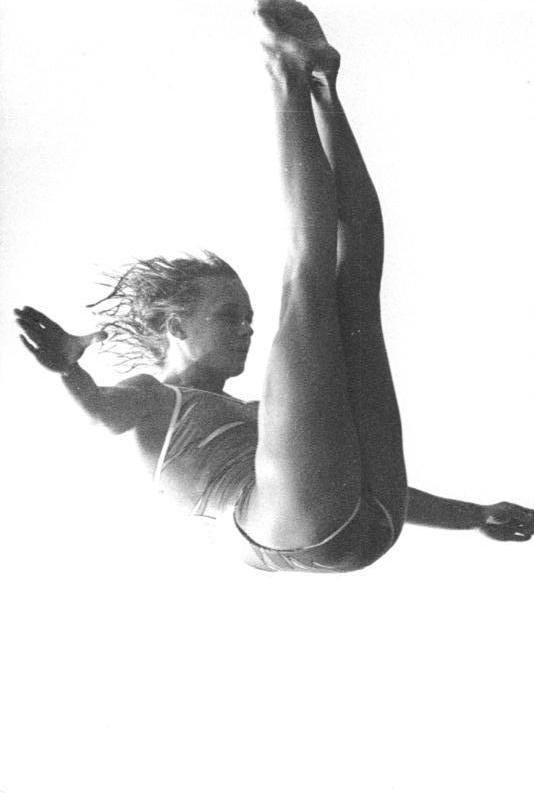
- Ute Wetzig in 1989

Personal information
- Born: 11 April 1971 (age 55) Halle an der Saale, Sachsen-Anhalt, West Germany

Sport
- Sport: Diving
Medal record
Representing Germany
European Championships
Gold medal – first place	1989 Bonn	10 m platform
Gold medal – first place	1995 Vienna	10 m platform
Gold medal – first place	1997 Seville	10 m platform synchro
Gold medal – first place	2000 Helsinki	10 m platform synchro
Silver medal – second place	1993 Sheffield	10 m platform
Silver medal – second place	1999 Istanbul	10 m platform synchro
Silver medal – second place	2000 Helsinki	10 m platform
Bronze medal – third place	1991 Athens	10 m platform

Ute Wetzig (born 11 April 1971) is a female diver from Germany, who won a gold, a silver and a bronze medal in the women's 10 m platform event at the European Championships in the early 1990s.

Wetzig competed for her native country in three consecutive Summer Olympics, starting in 1992 (Barcelona, Spain). She was affiliated with the BSV AOK Leipzig during her career.
