= Marina Babkova =

Soviet diver (born 1969)

Personal information
- Born: 24 November 1969 (age 56) Moscow, Soviet Union

Sport
- Sport: Diving
- Club: CSKA
Medal record
Women's diving
Representing the Soviet Union
World Championships
Bronze medal – third place	1986 Madrid	3 m springboard
European Championships
Gold medal – first place	1989 Bonn	3 m springboard
Silver medal – second place	1987 Strasbourg	3 m springboard
Bronze medal – third place	1989 Bonn	1 m springboard

Marina Babkova (Russian: Марина Бабкова, born 24 November 1969) is a Soviet diver. She competed in the women's 3 metre springboard event at the 1988 Summer Olympics.
