= Igor Lukashin =

Russian diver

Personal information
- Born: 7 August 1979 (age 46)
Medal record
Men's diving
Representing Russia
Olympic Games
Gold medal – first place	2000 Sydney	10 m synchro
World Championships
Bronze medal – third place	1998 Perth	10 m synchro
European Championships
Gold medal – first place	2000 Helsinki	10 m synchro
Silver medal – second place	1997 Seville	10 m synchro
Silver medal – second place	1999 Istanbul	10 m synchro
Bronze medal – third place	2000 Helsinki	10 m platform

Igor Vladimirovich Lukashin (Russian: Игорь Владимирович Лукашин; born 7 August 1979, in Penza) is a Russian diver who, along with Dmitri Sautin, won the gold medal at the 2000 Summer Olympics in the men's 10 m platform synchronized event.
