= Marianne Muis =

Dutch swimmer (born 1968)

Personal information
- Born: 28 July 1968 (age 58) Amsterdam, Netherlands

Sport
- Club: Dedemsvaart AC
Medal record
Women's swimming
Representing the Netherlands
Olympic Games
| Silver medal – second place | 1988 Seoul | 4×100 m freestyle |
World Championships (LC)
| Silver medal – second place | 1991 Perth | 4×200 m freestyle |
| Bronze medal – third place | 1986 Madrid | 4×200 m freestyle |
| Bronze medal – third place | 1991 Perth | 4×100 m freestyle |
European Championships (LC)
| Silver medal – second place | 1989 Bonn | 200 m freestyle |
| Silver medal – second place | 1989 Bonn | 200 m medley |
| Silver medal – second place | 1987 Strasbourg | 4×100 m freestyle |
| Silver medal – second place | 1989 Bonn | 4×100 m freestyle |
| Silver medal – second place | 1989 Bonn | 4×200 m freestyle |
| Bronze medal – third place | 1989 Bonn | 100 m freestyle |
| Bronze medal – third place | 1989 Bonn | 4×100 m medley |
Summer Universiade
| Silver medal – second place | 1995 Fukuoka | 100 m freestyle |
| Bronze medal – third place | 1987 Zagreb | 200 m medley |
| Bronze medal – third place | 1995 Fukuoka | 50 m freestyle |

Marianne Muis (born 28 July 1968 in Amsterdam) is a female former medley and freestyle swimmer from the Netherlands.

== Swimming career ==
Muis competed in three consecutive Summer Olympics for her native country, starting in 1988. She won the silver medal with the Dutch women's 4×100 m freestyle relay team, behind East Germany, at the 1988 Olympics. Her twin sister and two-time Olympian Mildred was on the same silver winning team.

Despite being of Dutch nationality she won the 200 metres medley title in 1988 at the ASA National British Championships.
