= Julie Danaux =

French diver

Personal information
- Nationality: French
- Born: 4 September 1975 (age 50) Paris, France

Sport
- Sport: Diving
Medal record
Women's diving
Representing France
European Championships
Silver medal – second place	1997 Seville	10 m synchro
Bronze medal – third place	1999 Istanbul	3 m synchro
Bronze medal – third place	1999 Istanbul	10 m synchro
Summer Universiade
Silver medal – second place	1997 Sicily	10 m platform

Julie Danaux (born 4 September 1975) is a French diver. She competed at the 1996 Summer Olympics and the 2000 Summer Olympics. In 1996, she competed in the Women's Platform event where she placed 29th; four years later in Sydney she competed in both the Women's SpringBoard and Women's Synchronized Platform events where she placed 36th and 7th respectively.
