= Jukka Piekkanen =

Finnish diver

Personal information
- Nationality: Finnish
- Born: 22 November 1975 (age 50) Helsinki, Finland

Sport
- Sport: Diving
Medal record
Men's diving
Representing Finland
European Championships
Bronze medal – third place	1999 Istanbul	3 m springboard

Jukka Piekkanen (born 22 November 1975) is a Finnish former diver. He competed at the 2000 Summer Olympics and the 2004 Summer Olympics.
