= Diving at the 1997 Summer Universiade =

The Diving competition in the 1997 Summer Universiade were held in the island of Sicily, Italy.

== Medal overview ==
Event	Gold	Silver	Bronze
Men's 1-Meter Springboard	Imre Lengyel (HUN)	Wang Tianling (CHN)	Chris Lepoole (CAN)
Men's 3-Meter Springboard	Imre Lengyel (HUN)	Pat Bogart (USA)	Dean Pullar (AUS)
Men's Platform	Xiao Hailiang (CHN)	Wei Jianhui (CHN)	Jesús Aballi (CUB)
Men's Team	United States (USA)	Mexico (MEX)	China (CHN)
Women's 1-Meter Springboard	Lu Haisong (CHN)	Chen Lixia (CHN)	Michelle Rojohn (USA)
Women's 3-Meter Springboard	Zhu Jinhong (CHN)	Lu Haisong (CHN)	María José Alcalá (MEX)
Women's Platform	Chi Meilan (CHN)	Julie Danaux (FRA)	Wang Xuan (CHN)
Women's Team	China (CHN)	United States (USA)	Russia (RUS)

== Medal table ==
Rank	Nation	Gold	Silver	Bronze	Total
1	China (CHN)	5	4	2	11
2	Hungary (HUN)	2	0	0	2
3	United States (USA)	1	2	1	4
4	Mexico (MEX)	0	1	1	2
5	France (FRA)	0	1	0	1
6	Australia (AUS)	0	0	1	1
6	Canada (CAN)	0	0	1	1
6	Cuba (CUB)	0	0	1	1
6	Russia (RUS)	0	0	1	1
Totals (9 entries)		8	8	8	24
