= Mildred Muis =

Dutch swimmer (born 1968)

Personal information
- National team: Netherlands
- Born: 28 July 1968 (age 57) Amsterdam, Netherlands

Sport
- Sport: Swimming
Medal record
Women's swimming
Representing the Netherlands
Olympic Games
Silver medal – second place	1988 Seoul	4×100 m freestyle
World Championships
Silver medal – second place	1991 Perth	4×200 m freestyle
Bronze medal – third place	1986 Madrid	4×200 m freestyle
Bronze medal – third place	1991 Perth	4×100 m freestyle
European Championships (LC)
Silver medal – second place	1985 Sofia	4×200 m freestyle
Silver medal – second place	1987 Strasbourg	4×100 m freestyle
Silver medal – second place	1989 Bonn	4×100 m freestyle
Silver medal – second place	1989 Bonn	4×200 m freestyle
Bronze medal – third place	1989 Bonn	200 m medley
Summer Universiade
Silver medal – second place	1987 Zagreb	200 m medley
Bronze medal – third place	1987 Zagreb	100 m freestyle

Mildred Muis (born 28 July 1968 in Amsterdam) is a former medley and freestyle swimmer from the Netherlands, who competed in two consecutive Summer Olympics for her native country, starting in 1988. There she won the silver medal with the Dutch women's 4×100 m freestyle relay team, behind East Germany. Her twin sister and three-time Olympian Marianne was on the same silver winning team.
