= Jesús Aballí =

Cuban diver

Personal information
- Full name: Jesús Iory Aballí Martínez
- Nationality: Cuban
- Born: 5 April 1974 (age 52)
- Height: 1.67 m (5 ft 6 in)
- Weight: 65 kg (143 lb)

Sport
- Sport: Diving
Medal record
Men's diving
Representing Cuba
Summer Universiade
Bronze medal – third place	1997 Sicily	10 m platform
Bronze medal – third place	1999 Palma de Mallorca	10 m platform

Jesús Iory Aballí Martínez (born 5 April 1974) is a Cuban diver. He competed in the 2000 Summer Olympics.
