= 2027 World Aquatics Women's Water Polo World Cup =

- League: FINA Water Polo World Cup
- Sport: Water polo
- Duration: 6 December – 28 February

Super Final

World Aquatics Women's Water Polo World Cup seasons
- ← 2026 2028 →

The 2027 Women's World Aquatics Water Polo World Cup will be the 20th edition of the tournament. It will run from 6 December 2026 to 28 February 2027. The super final will be held in Athens, Greece.

The winner will qualify for the 2028 Summer Olympics.

== Format ==
There will be two divisions. The top-six teams of Division 1 and the top-two teams from Division 2 will compete in the super final. A win gives a team three points, a win after penalties two, a loss after penalties one and a loss after regular time zero points.

== Division 1 ==
Division 1
Tournament details
- Host country: Portugal
- Venue: 1 (in 1 host city)
- Dates: 14–19 December
- Teams: 8 (from 3 confederations)

Division 1 will be held in Coimbra, Portugal from 14 and 19 December 2026.

The teams are split into two pools of four teams, with the top two-teams forming a new group, same with the bottom two-teams. The top five teams advance to the super final along with the hosts, Greece.

=== Preliminary round ===
==== Group A ====
Pos	Team	Pld	W	PW	PL	L	GF	GA	GD	Pts	Qualification
1	Australia	0	0	0	0	0	0	0	0	0	Group C
1	Hungary	0	0	0	0	0	0	0	0	0	Group C
1	United States	0	0	0	0	0	0	0	0	0	Group D
1	Netherlands	0	0	0	0	0	0	0	0	0	Group D

First match(es) will be played: 14 December 2026. Source:
Rules for classification: 1) Points; 2) Head-to-head points; 3) Head-to-head goal difference; 4) Head-to-head goals scored; 5) Goal difference.

14 December 2026; 14:30	Australia	–	Netherlands	Centro Olímpico de Piscinas Municipais, Coimbra

14 December 2026; 16:15	Hungary	–	United States	Centro Olímpico de Piscinas Municipais, Coimbra

15 December 2026; 14:30	Netherlands	–	Hungary	Centro Olímpico de Piscinas Municipais, Coimbra

15 December 2026; 16:15	United States	–	Australia	Centro Olímpico de Piscinas Municipais, Coimbra

16 December 2026; 14:30	Australia	–	Hungary	Centro Olímpico de Piscinas Municipais, Coimbra

16 December 2026; 16:15	United States	–	Netherlands	Centro Olímpico de Piscinas Municipais, Coimbra

==== Group B ====
Pos	Team	Pld	W	PW	PL	L	GF	GA	GD	Pts	Qualification
1	Spain	0	0	0	0	0	0	0	0	0	Group C
1	Russia	0	0	0	0	0	0	0	0	0	Group C
1	Greece	0	0	0	0	0	0	0	0	0	Group D
1	Italy	0	0	0	0	0	0	0	0	0	Group D

First match(es) will be played: 14 December 2026. Source:
Rules for classification: 1) Points; 2) Head-to-head points; 3) Head-to-head goal difference; 4) Head-to-head goals scored; 5) Goal difference.

14 December 2026; 18:00	Russia	–	Greece	Centro Olímpico de Piscinas Municipais, Coimbra

14 December 2026; 19:45	Spain	–	Italy	Centro Olímpico de Piscinas Municipais, Coimbra

15 December 2026; 18:00	Greece	–	Spain	Centro Olímpico de Piscinas Municipais, Coimbra

15 December 2026; 19:45	Italy	–	Russia	Centro Olímpico de Piscinas Municipais, Coimbra

16 December 2026; 18:00	Greece	–	Italy	Centro Olímpico de Piscinas Municipais, Coimbra

16 December 2026; 19:45	Spain	–	Russia	Centro Olímpico de Piscinas Municipais, Coimbra

=== Second round ===
The points obtained against teams from the same preliminary group are carried over.

==== Group C ====
Pos	Team	Pld	W	PW	PL	L	GF	GA	GD	Pts	Qualification
1	A1	0	0	0	0	0	0	0	0	0	Super final
1	B1	0	0	0	0	0	0	0	0	0	Super final
1	A2	0	0	0	0	0	0	0	0	0	Super final
1	B2	0	0	0	0	0	0	0	0	0	Super final

First match(es) will be played: 18 December 2026. Source:
Rules for classification: 1) Points; 2) Head-to-head points; 3) Head-to-head goal difference; 4) Head-to-head goals scored; 5) Goal difference.

18 December 2026; 18:00	B1	–	A2	Centro Olímpico de Piscinas Municipais, Coimbra

18 December 2026; 19:45	A1	–	B2	Centro Olímpico de Piscinas Municipais, Coimbra

19 December 2026; 15:30	B2	–	A2	Centro Olímpico de Piscinas Municipais, Coimbra

19 December 2026; 17:15	A1	–	B1	Centro Olímpico de Piscinas Municipais, Coimbra

==== Group D ====
Pos	Team	Pld	W	PW	PL	L	GF	GA	GD	Pts	Qualification
1	A3	0	0	0	0	0	0	0	0	0	Super final
1	B3	0	0	0	0	0	0	0	0	0	Super final
1	A4	0	0	0	0	0	0	0	0	0	Super final
1	B4	0	0	0	0	0	0	0	0	0	Super final

First match(es) will be played: 18 December 2026. Source:
Rules for classification: 1) Points; 2) Head-to-head points; 3) Head-to-head goal difference; 4) Head-to-head goals scored; 5) Goal difference.

18 December 2026; 14:30	B3	–	A4	Centro Olímpico de Piscinas Municipais, Coimbra

18 December 2026; 16:15	A3	–	B4	Centro Olímpico de Piscinas Municipais, Coimbra

19 December 2026; 12:00	B4	–	A4	Centro Olímpico de Piscinas Municipais, Coimbra

19 December 2026; 13:45	A3	–	B3	Centro Olímpico de Piscinas Municipais, Coimbra

== Division 2 ==
Division 2
Tournament details
- Host country: Portugal
- Venue: 1 (in 1 host city)
- Dates: 14–19 December
- Teams: 13 (from 5 confederations)

Division 1 will be held in Coimbra, Portugal 14 and 19 December 2026.

13 teams are split into four groups. The top two teams of each group advance to the knockout stage, where the top two teams qualify for the super final.

=== Preliminary round ===
==== Group A ====
Pos	Team	Pld	W	PW	PL	L	GF	GA	GD	Pts	Qualification
1	Portugal (H)	0	0	0	0	0	0	0	0	0	Quarterfinals
1	Croatia	0	0	0	0	0	0	0	0	0	Quarterfinals
1	France	0	0	0	0	0	0	0	0	0	

First match(es) will be played: 7 December 2026. Source:
Rules for classification: 1) Points; 2) Head-to-head points; 3) Head-to-head goal difference; 4) Head-to-head goals scored; 5) Goal difference.
(H) Host

7 December 2026; 18:00	Portugal	–	France	Centro Olímpico de Piscinas Municipais, Coimbra

8 December 2026; 11:00	France	–	Croatia	Centro Olímpico de Piscinas Municipais, Coimbra

9 December 2026; 18:00	Portugal	–	Croatia	Centro Olímpico de Piscinas Municipais, Coimbra

==== Group B ====
Pos	Team	Pld	W	PW	PL	L	GF	GA	GD	Pts	Qualification
1	China	0	0	0	0	0	0	0	0	0	Quarterfinals
1	Germany	0	0	0	0	0	0	0	0	0	Quarterfinals
1	South Africa	0	0	0	0	0	0	0	0	0	

First match(es) will be played: 7 December 2026. Source:
Rules for classification: 1) Points; 2) Head-to-head points; 3) Head-to-head goal difference; 4) Head-to-head goals scored; 5) Goal difference.

7 December 2026; 11:00	China	–	South Africa	Centro Olímpico de Piscinas Municipais, Coimbra

8 December 2026; 12:45	South Africa	–	Germany	Centro Olímpico de Piscinas Municipais, Coimbra

9 December 2026; 11:00	China	–	Germany	Centro Olímpico de Piscinas Municipais, Coimbra

==== Group C ====
Pos	Team	Pld	W	PW	PL	L	GF	GA	GD	Pts	Qualification
1	Israel	0	0	0	0	0	0	0	0	0	Quarterfinals
1	Great Britain	0	0	0	0	0	0	0	0	0	Quarterfinals
1	Canada	0	0	0	0	0	0	0	0	0	

First match(es) will be played: 7 December 2026. Source:
Rules for classification: 1) Points; 2) Head-to-head points; 3) Head-to-head goal difference; 4) Head-to-head goals scored; 5) Goal difference.

7 December 2026; 12:45	Israel	–	Canada	Centro Olímpico de Piscinas Municipais, Coimbra

8 December 2026; 14:30	Canada	–	Great Britain	Centro Olímpico de Piscinas Municipais, Coimbra

9 December 2026; 12:45	Israel	–	Great Britain	Centro Olímpico de Piscinas Municipais, Coimbra

==== Group D ====
Pos	Team	Pld	W	PW	PL	L	GF	GA	GD	Pts	Qualification
1	Japan	0	0	0	0	0	0	0	0	0	Quarterfinals
1	Turkey	0	0	0	0	0	0	0	0	0	Quarterfinals
1	Serbia	0	0	0	0	0	0	0	0	0	
1	New Zealand	0	0	0	0	0	0	0	0	0	

First match(es) will be played: 7 December 2026. Source:
Rules for classification: 1) Points; 2) Head-to-head points; 3) Head-to-head goal difference; 4) Head-to-head goals scored; 5) Goal difference.

7 December 2026; 14:30	Japan	–	Serbia	Centro Olímpico de Piscinas Municipais, Coimbra

7 December 2026; 16:15	Turkey	–	New Zealand	Centro Olímpico de Piscinas Municipais, Coimbra

8 December 2026; 16:15	Serbia	–	Turkey	Centro Olímpico de Piscinas Municipais, Coimbra

8 December 2026; 18:00	New Zealand	–	Japan	Centro Olímpico de Piscinas Municipais, Coimbra

9 December 2026; 14:30	Japan	–	Turkey	Centro Olímpico de Piscinas Municipais, Coimbra

9 December 2026; 16:15	Serbia	–	New Zealand	Centro Olímpico de Piscinas Municipais, Coimbra

=== Placement games ===
10 December 2026; 16:15	Match 1	Team 11	–	Team 12	Centro Olímpico de Piscinas Municipais, Coimbra

10 December 2026; 10:00	Match 2	Team 9	–	Team 10	Centro Olímpico de Piscinas Municipais, Coimbra

11 December 2026; 10:00	Match 3	Team 13	–	Loser of match 1	Centro Olímpico de Piscinas Municipais, Coimbra

11 December 2026; 11:30	Match 4	Loser of match 2	–	Winner of match 1	Centro Olímpico de Piscinas Municipais, Coimbra

12 December 2026; 10:00	Match 5	Loser of match 3	–	Loser of match 4	Centro Olímpico de Piscinas Municipais, Coimbra

12 December 2026; 11:30	Match 6	Winner of match 2	–	Winner of match 4	Centro Olímpico de Piscinas Municipais, Coimbra

13 December 2026; 10:00	Winner of match 3	–	Loser of match 6	Centro Olímpico de Piscinas Municipais, Coimbra

13 December 2026; 11:30	Winner of match 5	–	Winner of match 6	Centro Olímpico de Piscinas Municipais, Coimbra

=== Final phase ===
Teams are ranked by their preliminary round results, with first-placed teams ranked one to four and second-ranked teams fifth to eighth.

==== Bracket ====
Quarter-finals
11 December
1 Team 1
8 Team 8
11 December
4 Team 4
5 Team 5
11 December
2 Team 2
7 Team 7
11 December
3 Team 3
6 Team 8

Semi-finals
12 December
12 December

Final
13 December
Third place
13 December

Fifth place bracket

5–8th place semifinals
12 December
12 December

Fifth place
13 December
Seventh place
13 December

==== Quarterfinals ====
11 December 2026; 13:00	Team 1	–	Team 8	Centro Olímpico de Piscinas Municipais, Coimbra

11 December 2026; 15:00	Team 2	–	Team 7	Centro Olímpico de Piscinas Municipais, Coimbra

11 December 2026; 16:30	Team 3	–	Team 6	Centro Olímpico de Piscinas Municipais, Coimbra

11 December 2026; 18:00	Team 4	–	Team 5	Centro Olímpico de Piscinas Municipais, Coimbra

==== 5–8th place semifinals ====
12 December 2026; 13:00	LQF1	–	LQF2	Centro Olímpico de Piscinas Municipais, Coimbra

12 December 2026; 15:00	LQF3	–	LQF4	Centro Olímpico de Piscinas Municipais, Coimbra

==== Semifinals ====
12 December 2026; 16:30	WQF1	–	WQF2	Centro Olímpico de Piscinas Municipais, Coimbra

12 December 2026; 18:00	WQF3	–	WQF4	Centro Olímpico de Piscinas Municipais, Coimbra

==== Seventh place game ====
13 December 2026; 13:00	LSF1	–	LSF2	Centro Olímpico de Piscinas Municipais, Coimbra

==== Fifth place game ====
13 December 2026; 15:00	WSF1	–	WSF2	Centro Olímpico de Piscinas Municipais, Coimbra

==== Third place game ====
13 December 2026; 16:30	LSF1	–	LSF2	Centro Olímpico de Piscinas Municipais, Coimbra

==== Final ====
13 December 2026; 18:00	WSF1	–	WSF2	Centro Olímpico de Piscinas Municipais, Coimbra

== Super final ==
Super final
Tournament details
- Host country: Greece
- Venue: 1 (in 1 host city)
- Dates: 24–28 February
- Teams: 8

The tournament will take place between 24 and 28 February 2027 in Athens, Greece.

Teams

- Greece

=== Bracket ===
Quarter-finals
24 February
24 February
24 February
24 February

Semi-finals
26 February
26 February

Final
28 February
Third place
28 February

Fifth place bracket

5–8th place semifinals
26 February
26 February

Fifth place
27 February
Seventh place
27 February

== Final standings ==
Rank	Team
1st place, gold medalist(s)	
2nd place, silver medalist(s)	
3rd place, bronze medalist(s)	
4	
5	
6	
7	
8	

Qualified for the 2028 Summer Olympics

== See also ==
- 2027 World Aquatics Men's Water Polo World Cup
