= Mara Brunetti =

Italian synchronized swimmer

Personal information
- Born: April 9, 1976 (age 50) Rome, Italy

Sport
- Sport: Synchronised swimming
Medal record
European Championships
Silver medal – second place	2000 Helsinki	Team competition
Bronze medal – third place	1995 Vienna	Team competition
Bronze medal – third place	1999 Istanbul	Team competition

Mara Brunetti (born 9 April 1976) is an Italian former synchronized swimmer who competed in the 1996 Summer Olympics and in the 2000 Summer Olympics.
