= Svetlana Alekseyeva =

Belarusian diver (born 1970)

Personal information
- Nationality: Belarusian
- Born: 13 March 1970 (age 56) Minsk, Belarus

Sport
- Sport: Diving
Medal record
Women's diving
European Championships
Representing the Soviet Union
Bronze medal – third place	1989 Bonn	3 m springboard
Representing Belarus
Bronze medal – third place	1995 Vienna	1 m springboard

Svetlana Alekseyeva (born 13 March 1970) is a Belarusian diver. She competed at the 1996 Summer Olympics and the 2000 Summer Olympics.
