= Cathleen Rund =

German swimmer

Personal information
- Born: 3 November 1977 (age 48) East Berlin, East Germany
Medal record
Women's swimming
Representing Germany
Olympic Games
Bronze medal – third place	1996 Atlanta	200 m backstroke
European Championships (LC)
Gold medal – first place	1995 Vienna	4×100 m medley
Gold medal – first place	1997 Seville	200 m backstroke
Silver medal – second place	1995 Vienna	100 m backstroke
Silver medal – second place	1999 Istanbul	200 m backstroke
Bronze medal – third place	1995 Vienna	200 m backstroke
Bronze medal – third place	1995 Vienna	400 m individual medley

Cathleen Großmann (born Cathleen Rund; 3 November 1977 in Berlin), formerly called Cathleen Stolze, is a former backstroke and medley swimmer from Germany, who competed at two consecutive Summer Olympics for her native country, starting in 1996 in Atlanta, Georgia. There she won the bronze medal in the 200 m backstroke. Rund retired from international competition after the Sydney Olympics in 2000. In 2004, she moved to Frankfurt to work as a swimming trainer.

== Private life ==
Cathleen Großmann is the daughter of former East German Olympians Evelyn Stolze (swimming) and Peter Rund (water polo), and changed her name back from Stolze to Rund when they remarried in 1993. She attended the Werner-Seelenbinder-Schule, before studying sport at the Humboldt University of Berlin.
