= Simona Koch =

German retired diver (born 1968)

Personal information
- Born: 27 May 1968 (age 58) Berlin, Germany
- Height: 1.64 m (5 ft 4 1/2 in)
Medal record
Women's diving
Representing Germany
European Championships
Gold medal – first place	1993 Sheffield	1 m springboard
Silver medal – second place	1999 Istanbul	3 m synchro
Bronze medal – third place	1993 Sheffield	3 m springboard

Simona Koch (born 27 May 1968) is a German retired diver who competed for her country at the Summer Olympics in 1992 and 1996. She was affiliated with the Berliner Turn- und Sportclub in Berlin. Koch won two medals at the 1993 European Championships.

== Bibliography ==
- sports-reference
