= Magali Rathier =

French synchronized swimmer

Personal information
- Born: 2 December 1974 (age 51) Firminy, France

Sport
- Sport: Synchronised swimming
Medal record
Representing France
European Championships
Silver medal – second place	1993 Sheffield	Team
Silver medal – second place	1995 Vienna	Team
Silver medal – second place	1999 Istanbul	Team
Bronze medal – third place	2000 Helsinki	Team

Magali Rathier (born 2 December 1974, in Firminy) is a French former synchronized swimmer who competed in the 1996 Summer Olympics and in the 2000 Summer Olympics for the women's team, finishing fifth and fourth, respectively.
