= Myriam Lignot =

French synchronized swimmer

Personal information
- Nationality: French
- Born: 9 July 1975 (age 51) Laon
- Height: 169 cm (5 ft 7 in)
- Weight: 53 kg (117 lb)

Sport
- Country: France
- Sport: Synchronized swimming
- Events: Duet, Team

Achievements and titles
- Olympic finals: 2000 Summer Olympics
Medal record
Synchronized swimming
Representing France
Summer Olympics
| Bronze medal – third place | 2000 Sydney | Duet |
LEN European Aquatics Championships
| Silver medal – second place | 1995 Vienna | Duet |
| Silver medal – second place | 1997 Sevilla | Duet |
| Silver medal – second place | 1999 Istanbul | Duet |
| Silver medal – second place | 2000 Helsinki | Duet |
| Bronze medal – third place | 2000 Helsinki | Team |

Myriam Lignot (born 9 July 1975 in Laon, Aisne) is a French synchronized swimmer and Olympic medalist. She won a bronze medal at the 2000 Summer Olympics in Sydney, in duet together with Virginie Dedieu, and placed fourth in the team competition.

Lignot retired after the Sydney 2000 Games at the age of 25. Few years later, she became coach of Pays d'Aix Natation synchronized swimming club.

== Career records ==
Duet
1994 World Aquatics Championships, Rome, 4th (with Marianne Aeschbacher)
1995 European Aquatics Championships, Vienna, 2nd (with Marianne Aeschbacher)
1997 European Aquatics Championships, Sevilla, 2nd (with Virginie Dedieu)
1999 European Aquatics Championships, Istanbul, 2nd (with Virginie Dedieu)
2000 European Aquatics Championships, Helsinki, 2nd (with Virginie Dedieu)
2000 Summer Olympics, Sydney, 3rd (with Virginie Dedieu)

Team
1996 Summer Olympics, Atlanta, 5th
2000 European Aquatics Championships, Helsinki, 3rd
2000 Summer Olympics, Sydney, 4th
