= Karine Schuler =

French synchronized swimmer

Personal information
- Nationality: France
- Born: 29 November 1968 (age 57) Versailles, France
- Height: 1.72 m (5 ft 8 in)
- Weight: 53 kg (117 lb)

Sport
- Sport: Swimming
- Strokes: Synchronized swimming
- Club: Racing Club de France
Medal record
Representing France
Synchronized swimming
European Aquatics Championships
Gold medal – first place	1987 Strasbourg	Women's duet
Gold medal – first place	1989 Bonn	Women's duet
Silver medal – second place	1989 Bonn	Women's solo
- Updated on 8 February 2015

Karine Schuler (born 29 November 1968) is a former synchronized swimmer from France. She competed in the women's solo competition at both the 1988 and 1992 Summer Olympics.
