= 1993 European Aquatics Championships =

Water sport competitions

21st European Aquatics Championships
- Host city: Sheffield, United Kingdom
- Date: 3–8 August 1993
- Venue: Ponds Forge International Sports Centre
- Events: 47

The 1993 European Aquatics Championships were held in Sheffield, United Kingdom from Tuesday 3 August to Sunday 8 August, in the 50 m pool of the Ponds Forge International Sports Centre. The 21st edition of the event was organised by the LEN.

Besides swimming there were titles contested in open water swimming, diving, synchronised swimming (women) and water polo. The open water competition though was held in Slapy, Czech Republic from 28 to 29 August, while the women's water polo tournament was played in Leeds.

The swimming championships resulted in one world and one European record: Károly Güttler improved the world's best time in the qualifying heats of the men's 100 m breaststroke, while Franziska van Almsick bettered the continental's best time in the women's 100 m freestyle. Star swimmer at this meet was Krisztina Egerszegi, winning four gold medals for Hungary.

== Medal table ==
* Host nation (Great Britain)

Rank	Nation	Gold	Silver	Bronze	Total
1	Germany	15	6	8	29
2	Russia	12	12	5	29
3	Hungary	6	4	2	12
4	Italy	3	2	2	7
5	Finland	3	1	0	4
6	France	2	5	2	9
7	Great Britain*	1	3	8	12
8	Netherlands	1	3	3	7
9	Spain	1	1	3	5
10	Czech Republic	1	0	4	5
11	Belgium	1	0	0	1
11	Poland	1	0	0	1
13	Sweden	0	6	3	9
14	Ukraine	0	1	2	3
15	Norway	0	1	1	2
16	Romania	0	1	0	1
16	Slovakia	0	1	0	1
18	Belarus	0	0	1	1
18	Croatia	0	0	1	1
18	Lithuania	0	0	1	1
18	Slovenia	0	0	1	1
Totals (21 entries)		47	47	47	141

== Swimming ==
=== Men's events ===
Event	Gold	Silver	Bronze
50 m freestyle	Alexander Popov; Russia	Christophe Kalfayan; France	Raimundas Mažuolis; Lithuania
100 m freestyle	Alexander Popov; Russia	Tommy Werner; Sweden	Pavel Khnykin; Ukraine
200 m freestyle	Antti Kasvio; Finland	Yevgeny Sadovyi; Russia	Anders Holmertz; Sweden
400 m freestyle	Antti Kasvio; Finland	(United Kingdom) Paul Palmer; Great Britain	Anders Holmertz; Sweden
1500 m freestyle	Jörg Hoffmann; Germany	Sebastian Wiese; Germany	Igor Majcen; Slovenia
100 m backstroke	Martin López-Zubero; Spain	Vladimir Selkov; Russia	(United Kingdom) Martin Harris; Great Britain
200 m backstroke	Vladimir Selkov; Russia	Martin López-Zubero; Spain	Emanuele Merisi; Italy
100 m breaststroke	Károly Güttler; Hungary	(United Kingdom) Nick Gillingham; Great Britain	Vitaly Kirinchuk; Russia
200 m breaststroke	(United Kingdom) Nick Gillingham; Great Britain	Károly Güttler; Hungary	Andrey Korneyev; Russia
100 m butterfly	Rafał Szukała; Poland	Denis Pankratov; Russia	Miloš Milošević; Croatia
200 m butterfly	Denis Pankratov; Russia	Franck Esposito; France	Chris-Carol Bremer; Germany
200 m individual medley	Jani Sievinen; Finland	Attila Czene; Hungary	Christian Keller; Germany
400 m individual medley	Tamás Darnyi; Hungary	Jani Sievinen; Finland	Marcel Wouda; Netherlands
4 × 100 m freestyle relay	Russia; Vladimir Predkin; Vladimir Pyshnenko; Yevgeny Sadovyi; Alexander Popov	Sweden; Fredrik Letzler; Tommy Werner; Lars Frölander; Anders Holmertz	Germany; Christian Tröger; Jochen Bludau; Steffen Zesner; Bengt Zikarsky
4 × 200 m freestyle relay	Russia; Sergey Lepikov; Vladimir Pyshnenko; Yuri Mukin; Yevgeny Sadovyi	Germany; Jörg Hoffmann; Christian Tröger; Christian Keller; Steffen Zesner	France; Christophe Marchand; Yann DeFabrique; Lionel Poirot; Christophe Bordeau
4 × 100 m medley relay	Russia; Vladimir Selkov; Vitaly Kirinchuk; Denis Pankratov; Alexander Popov	Hungary; Tamás Deutsch; Károly Güttler; Péter Horváth; Béla Szabados	Great Britain; Martin Harris; Nick Gillingham; Mike Fibbens; Mark Foster

=== Women's events ===
Event	Gold	Silver	Bronze
50 m freestyle	Franziska van Almsick; Germany	Linda Olofsson; Sweden	Inge de Bruijn; Netherlands
100 m freestyle	Franziska van Almsick; Germany	Martina Moravcová; Slovakia	Catherine Plewinski; France
200 m freestyle	Franziska van Almsick; Germany	Liliana Dobrescu; Romania	(United Kingdom) Karen Pickering; Great Britain
400 m freestyle	Dagmar Hase; Germany	Kerstin Kielgass; Germany	Irene Dalby; Norway
800 m freestyle	Jana Henke; Germany	Irene Dalby; Norway	Olga Šplíchalová; Czech Republic
100 m backstroke	Krisztina Egerszegi; Hungary	Nina Zhivanevskaya; Russia	Sandra Völker; Germany
200 m backstroke	Krisztina Egerszegi; Hungary	Lorenza Vigarani; Italy	Nina Zhivanevskaya; Russia
100 m breaststroke	Sylvia Gerasch; Germany	Svitlana Bondarenko; Ukraine	Yelena Rudkovskaya; Belarus
200 m breaststroke	Brigitte Becue; Belgium	Anna Nikitina; Russia	(United Kingdom) Marie Hardiman; Great Britain
100 m butterfly	Catherine Plewinski; France	Franziska van Almsick; Germany	Bettina Ustrowski; Germany
200 m butterfly	Krisztina Egerszegi; Hungary	Katrin Jaeke; Germany	Bárbara Franco; Spain
200 m individual medley	Daniela Hunger; Germany	Darya Shmeleva; Russia	Silvia Parera; Spain
400 m individual medley	Krisztina Egerszegi; Hungary	Darya Shmeleva; Russia	Hana Černá; Czech Republic
4 × 100 m freestyle relay	Germany; Franziska van Almsick; Kerstin Kielgass; Manuela Stellmach; Daniela Hunger	Sweden; Ellen Svensson; Linda Olofsson; Louise Jöhncke; Malin Nilsson	Russia; Svetlana Leshukova; Natalya Meshcheryakova; Olga Kirichenko; Nina Zhivanevskaya
4 × 200 m freestyle relay	Germany; Kerstin Kielgass; Simone Osygus; Franziska van Almsick; Dagmar Hase	Sweden; Louise Jöhncke; Magdalena Schultz; Therèse Lundin; Malin Nilsson	Great Britain; Sarah Hardcastle; Debbie Armitage; Claire Huddart; Karen Pickering
4 × 100 m medley relay	Germany; Sandra Völker; Sylvia Gerasch; Bettina Ustrowski; Franziska van Almsick	Russia; Nina Zhivanevskaya; Anna Nikitina; Olga Kirichenko; Natalya Meshcheryakova	Great Britain; Kathy Osher; Jaime King; Nicola Kennedy; Karen Pickering

== Open water swimming ==
- Held in Slapy, Czech Republic on 28 and 29 August 1993.

=== Men's events ===
Event	Gold	Silver	Bronze
5 km open water	Marco Formentini (ITA)	Claudio Cargaro (ITA)	Alex Havranek (CZE)
25 km open water	Dario Taraboi (ITA)	Hans van Goor (NED)	Attila Molnar (HUN)

=== Women's events ===
Event	Gold	Silver	Bronze
5 km open water	Olga Šplíchalová (CZE)	Carla Geurts (NED)	Eva Novaková (CZE)
25 km open water	Anne Chagnaud (FRA)	Gea Veldhuizen (NED)	Wandy Kater (NED)

== Diving ==
=== Men's events ===
Event	Gold	Silver	Bronze
1 m springboard	Peter Böhler; Germany	Joakim Andersson; Sweden	Boris Lietzow; Germany
3 m springboard	Jan Hempel; Germany	Dmitri Sautin; Russia	Joakim Andersson; Sweden
10 m platform	Dmitri Sautin; Russia	(United Kingdom) Bobby Morgan; Great Britain	Jan Hempel; Germany

=== Women's events ===
Event	Gold	Silver	Bronze
1 m springboard	Simona Koch; Germany	Irina Lashko; Russia	Vera Ilyina; Russia
3 m springboard	Brita Baldus; Germany	Vera Ilyina; Russia	Simona Koch; Germany
10 m platform	Svetlana Khokhlova; Russia	Ute Wetzig; Germany	Olena Zhupina; Ukraine

== Synchronized swimming ==
Event	Gold	Silver	Bronze
Solo	Olga Sedakova; Russia	Marianne Aeschbacher; France	(United Kingdom) Kerry Shacklock; Great Britain
Duet	Olga Sedakova; Anna Kozlova; Russia	Marianne Aeschbacher; Céline Leveque; France	(United Kingdom) Kerry Shacklock; Laila Vakil; Great Britain
Team	Russia; Elena Azarova; Olga Brusnikina; Natalia Gruzdeva; Anna Kozlova; Gana Maximova; Elena Nikashina; Olga Novokshchenova; Olga Sedakova	France; Marianne Aeschbacher; Celine Leveque; Myriam Lignot; Isabelle Manable; Delphine Marechal; Charlotte Massardier; Magali Rathier; Eva Riffet	Italy; Giada Ballan; Giovanna Burlando; Giorgia Canale; Manuela Carnini; Maurizia Cecconi; Paola Celli; Roberta Farinelli; Simona Ricotta

== Water polo ==
=== Men's team event ===
Event	Gold	Silver	Bronze
Team competition	Italy	Hungary	Spain

=== Women's team event ===
Event	Gold	Silver	Bronze
Team competition	Netherlands	Russia	Hungary
