= Julie Fabre =

French synchronized swimmer

Personal information
- Born: June 27, 1976 (age 50) Nice, France

Sport
- Sport: Synchronised swimming

Julie Fabre (born 27 June 1976) is a retired French synchronized swimmer who competed in the 1996 Summer Olympics. She is the sister of Charlotte Fabre.
