= Atakoy Olympic Pool Stadium =

Former swimming stadium in Istanbul, Turkey

Coordinates: 40.9869°N 28.8556°E

Ataköy Olympic Pool Stadium was an open-air swimming stadium in Istanbul, Turkey.

The 1999 European Aquatics Championships were held in the 50 m pool. Alongside swimming, aquatic sports included diving, synchronised swimming and open water swimming.

== History ==
Sinan Erdam built the stadium, as well as other Olympic Pools; e.g. the Sinan Erdam Dome.

The building was destroyed in 2009, but now a bigger sports complex stands there.
