= 1989 European Aquatics Championships =

Water sport competitions

19th European Aquatics Championships
- Host city: Bonn, West Germany
- Date: 15–20 August 1989
- Events: 43

The 1989 European Aquatics Championships were held from 15 to 20 August 1989 in Bonn, West Germany.

== Medal table ==
* Host nation (West Germany)

Rank	Nation	Gold	Silver	Bronze	Total
1	East Germany	16	11	11	38
2	Soviet Union	6	10	6	22
3	France	4	4	1	9
4	Italy	4	1	6	11
5	Hungary	3	4	1	8
6	West Germany*	3	3	3	9
7	Netherlands	2	4	3	9
8	Poland	2	2	2	6
9	Great Britain	2	0	1	3
10	Spain	1	0	0	1
11	Yugoslavia	0	1	1	2
12	Belgium	0	1	0	1
12	Bulgaria	0	1	0	1
12	Ireland	0	1	0	1
15	Switzerland	0	0	3	3
16	Denmark	0	0	2	2
16	Sweden	0	0	2	2
18	Norway	0	0	1	1
Totals (18 entries)		43	43	43	129

== Swimming ==
=== Men's events ===
Event	Gold		Silver		Bronze	
50 m freestyle	Volodymyr Tkachenko; Soviet Union	22.64	Evgeniy Kotriaga; Soviet Union	22.67	Nils Rudolph; East Germany	22.76
100 m freestyle	Giorgio Lamberti; Italy	49.24^{ER}	Yuri Bashkatov; Soviet Union	50.13	Raimundas Mažuolis; Soviet Union	50.15
200 m freestyle	Giorgio Lamberti; Italy	1:46.69^{WR}	Artur Wojdat; Poland	1:47.96	Anders Holmertz; Sweden	1:48.06
400 m freestyle	Artur Wojdat; Poland	3:47.78	Stefan Pfeiffer; West Germany	3:48.68	Mariusz Podkościelny; Poland	3:49.29
1500 m freestyle	Jörg Hoffmann; East Germany	15:01.52	Stefan Pfeiffer; West Germany	15:01.93	Mariusz Podkościelny; Poland	15:19.29
100 m backstroke	Martin López-Zubero; Spain	56.44	Sergei Zabolotnov; Soviet Union	56.45	Dirk Richter; East Germany	56.52
200 m backstroke	Stefano Battistelli; Italy	1:59.96	Vladimir Selkov; Soviet Union	2:00.02	Tino Weber; East Germany	2:00.54
100 m breaststroke	Adrian Moorhouse; Great Britain	1:01.71	Dmitry Volkov; Soviet Union	1:01.94	Nick Gillingham; Great Britain	1:02.12
200 m breaststroke	Nick Gillingham; Great Britain	2:12.90^{WR}	Gary O'Toole; Ireland	2:15.73	József Szabó; Hungary	2:16.05
100 m butterfly	Rafał Szukała; Poland	54.47	Bruno Gutzeit; France	54.50	Martin Herrmann; West Germany	54.54
200 m butterfly	Tamás Darnyi; Hungary	1:58.87	Rafał Szukała; Poland	2:00.62	Matjaž Koželj; Yugoslavia	2:00.73
200 m individual medley	Tamás Darnyi; Hungary	2:01.03	Raik Hannemann; East Germany	2:03.07	Josef Hladký; West Germany	2:03.21
400 m individual medley	Tamás Darnyi; Hungary	4:15.25	Patrick Kühl; East Germany	4:16.08	Stefano Battistelli; Italy	4:19.13
4 × 100 m freestyle relay	West Germany; Peter Sitt; André Schadt; Bengt Zikarsky; Björn Zikarsky	3:19.68	France; Stéphan Caron; Christophe Kalfayan; Laurent Neuville; Bruno Gutzeit	3:19.73	Sweden; Tommy Werner; Anders Holmertz; Håkan Karlsson; Joakim Holmqvist	3:19.76
4 × 200 m freestyle relay	Italy; Massimo Trevisan; Roberto Gleria; Giorgio Lamberti; Stefano Battistelli	7:15.39	West Germany; Peter Sitt; Martin Herrmann; Erik Hochstein; Stefan Pfeiffer	7:17.38	East Germany; Uwe Dassler; André Matzk; Thomas Flemming; Steffen Zesner	7:17.79
4 × 100 m medley relay	Soviet Union; Sergei Zabolotnov; Dmitry Volkov; Vadim Yaroschuk; Yury Bashkatov	3:41.44	France; Franck Schott; Cédric Penicaud; Bruno Gutzeit; Stéphan Caron	3:43.09	Italy; Stefano Battistelli; Gianni Minervini; Marco Braida; Giorgio Lamberti	3:43.14

=== Women's events ===
Event	Gold		Silver		Bronze	
50 m freestyle	Catherine Plewinski; France	25.63	Daniela Hunger; East Germany	25.64	Katrin Meissner; East Germany	25.87
100 m freestyle	Katrin Meissner; East Germany	55.38	Manuela Stellmach; East Germany	55.40	Marianne Muis; Netherlands	55.61
200 m freestyle	Manuela Stellmach; East Germany	1:58.93	Marianne Muis; Netherlands	1:59.96	Mette Jacobsen; Denmark	2:00.35
400 m freestyle	Anke Möhring; East Germany	4:05.84^{ER}	Heike Freidrich; East Germany	4:10.14	Manuela Melchiorri; Italy	4:10.89
800 m freestyle	Anke Möhring; East Germany	8:23.99	Astrid Strauss; East Germany	8:28.24	Irene Dalby; Norway	8:28.59
100 m backstroke	Kristin Otto; East Germany	1:01.86	Krisztina Egerszegi; Hungary	1:02.44	Anja Eichhorst; East Germany	1:03.10
200 m backstroke	Dagmar Hase; East Germany	2:12.46	Krisztina Egerszegi; Hungary	2:12.61	Kristin Otto; East Germany	2:14.29
100 m breaststroke	Susanne Börnike; East Germany	1:09.55	Tanya Dangalakova; Bulgaria	1:09.65	Manuela Dalla Valle; Italy	1:10.39
200 m breaststroke	Susanne Börnike; East Germany	2:27.77	Brigitte Becue; Belgium	2:29.94	Yelena Volkova; Soviet Union	2:29.95
100 m butterfly	Catherine Plewinski; France	59.08	Jacqueline Jacob; East Germany	1:00.42	Kathleen Nord; East Germany	1:00.81
200 m butterfly	Kathleen Nord; East Germany	2:09.33	Jacqueline Jacob; East Germany	2:10.94	Mette Jacobsen; Denmark	2:12.63
200 m individual medley	Daniela Hunger; East Germany	2:13.26	Marianne Muis; Netherlands	2:15.85	Mildred Muis; Netherlands	2:17.23
400 m individual medley	Daniela Hunger; East Germany	4:41.82	Krisztina Egerszegi; Hungary	4:44.75	Grit Müller; East Germany	4:46.06
4 × 100 m freestyle relay	East Germany; Katrin Meissner; Manuela Stellmach; Daniela Hunger; Heike Friedrich	3:42.46	Netherlands; Diana van der Plaats; Marieke Mastenbroek; Mildred Muis; Marianne Muis	3:43.66	West Germany; Katja Ziliox; Susanne Bosserhoff; Marion Aizpors; Birgit Lohberg-Schulz	3:46.15
4 × 200 m freestyle relay	East Germany; Anke Möhring; Manuela Stellmach; Astrid Strauss; Heike Friedrich	7:58.54	Netherlands; Diana van der Plaats; Kirsten Silvester; Mildred Muis; Marianne Muis	8:08.00	Italy; Tanya Vannini; Orietta Patron; Silvia Persi; Manuela Melchiorri	8:10.49
4 × 100 m medley relay	East Germany; Kristin Otto; Susanne Börnike; Jacqueline Jacob; Katrin Meissner	4:07.40	Italy; Lorenza Vigarani; Manuela Dalla Valle; Manuela Carosi; Silvia Persi	4:10.78	Netherlands; Ellen Elzerman; Kira Bulten; Judith Anema; Marianne Muis	4:11.53

== Diving ==
=== Men's events ===
Event	Gold		Silver		Bronze	
1 m springboard	Edwin Jongejans (NED)	394.08	Valery Statsenko (URS)	378.24	Aleksandr Gladchenko (URS)	363.24
3 m springboard	Albin Killat (FRG)	672.75	Aleksandr Gladchenko (URS)	666.42	Jan Hempel (GDR)	663.84
10 m platform	Georgiy Chogovadze (URS)	639.69	Jan Hempel (GDR)	578.43	Vladimir Timoshinin (URS)	572.40

=== Women's events ===
Event	Gold		Silver		Bronze	
1 m springboard	Irina Lashko (URS)	278.46	Brita Baldus (GDR)	267.24	Marina Babkova (URS)	216.00
3 m springboard	Marina Babkova (URS)	514.23	Brita Baldus (GDR)	510.72	Svetlana Alekseyeva (URS)	486.09
10 m platform	Ute Wetzig (GDR)	403.35	Inga Afonina (URS)	400.83	Jana Eichler (GDR)	399.55

== Synchronized swimming ==
Event	Gold		Silver		Bronze	
Solo	Khristina Falasinidi (URS)	184.56	Karine Schuler (FRA)	182.87	Karin Singer (SUI)	181.83
Duet	Marianne Aeschbacher and Karine Schuler (FRA)	182.502	Maria Chernyaeva and Elena Foschevskaya (URS)	179.970	Edith Boss and Karin Singer (SUI)	179.652
Team competition	France (FRA); Karine Schuler; Marianne Aeschbacher; Anne Capron; Gaelle Quelin; Celine Leveque; Anne-Caroline Mathieu; Annie Lignot; Marie-Ange Bruckert	180.365	Soviet Union (URS); Khristina Falasinidi; Maria Chernyaeva; Elena Foschevskaya; Vera Artyomova; Elena Dolzhenko; Olga Pilipchuk; Gana Maximova; Ekaterina Lavrik	179.945	Switzerland (SUI); Karin Singer; Edith Boss; Claudia Peczinka; Claudia Muralt; Christine Lippuner; Simone Lippuner; Caroline Imoberdorf; Daniela Jordi	174.080

== Water polo ==
Event	Gold	Silver	Bronze
Men's team competition	West Germany	Yugoslavia	Italy

Event	Gold	Silver	Bronze
Women's team competition	Netherlands	Hungary	France
