= 1999 European Aquatics Championships =

Water sport competitions

24th European Aquatics Championships
- Host city: Istanbul, Turkey
- Date(s): 26 July – 1 August 1999
- Venue(s): Ataköy Olympic Pool Stadium
- Events: 55

The 1999 European Long Course Championships were a swimming competition held in Istanbul, Turkey from Monday 26 July to Sunday 1 August, in the 50 m pool of the Ataköy Olympic Pool Stadium. The 24th edition of the event was organised by the LEN.

The Istanbul championships resulted in two world and eight European records.

Alongside swimming (long course), the aquatics disciplines of diving, synchronised swimming and open water swimming were held. Water polo was no longer part of the LEN European Aquatics Championships from 1999 and separate European Water Polo Championship was held in Florence, Italy.

For the first time, the 50 m backstroke, breaststroke and butterfly were contested.

== Medal table ==
Rank	Nation	Gold	Silver	Bronze	Total
1	Germany	12	13	11	36
2	Russia	10	9	5	24
3	Netherlands	9	2	2	13
4	Ukraine	5	3	3	11
5	Sweden	3	5	3	11
6	Great Britain	3	4	6	13
7	France	3	3	6	12
8	Hungary	3	1	1	5
9	Italy	2	4	6	12
10	Romania	2	4	3	9
11	Spain	2	4	0	6
12	Denmark	1	0	0	1
13	Croatia	0	3	0	3
14	Israel	0	1	1	2
15	Poland	0	0	3	3
16	Finland	0	0	2	2
17	Belarus	0	0	1	1
17	Belgium	0	0	1	1
17	Czech Republic	0	0	1	1
17	Slovenia	0	0	1	1
Totals (20 entries)		55	56	56	167

== Swimming ==
=== Men's events ===
Event	Gold	Silver	Bronze
50 m freestyle	Pieter van den Hoogenband; Netherlands	Lorenzo Vismara; Italy	Alexander Popov; Russia
100 m freestyle	Pieter van den Hoogenband; Netherlands	Alexander Popov; Russia	Lars Frölander; Sweden
200 m freestyle	Pieter van den Hoogenband; Netherlands	(United Kingdom) Paul Palmer; Great Britain	Massimiliano Rosolino; Italy
400 m freestyle	(United Kingdom) Paul Palmer; Great Britain	Emiliano Brembilla; Italy	Dragoş Coman; Romania
1500 m freestyle	Igor Snitko; Ukraine	Dragoş Coman; Romania	Sylvain Cros; France
50 m backstroke	Stev Theloke; Germany	Thomas Rupprath; Germany	Mariusz Siembida; Poland
100 m backstroke	Stev Theloke; Germany	Gordan Kožulj; Croatia	Eithan Urbach; Israel
200 m backstroke	Ralf Braun; Germany	Gordan Kožulj; Croatia	Emanuele Merisi; Italy
50 m breaststroke	Mark Warnecke; Germany	Oleg Lisogor; Ukraine	Károly Güttler; Hungary
100 m breaststroke	Domenico Fioravanti; Italy	Mark Warnecke; Germany	Stéphan Perrot; France
200 m breaststroke	Stéphan Perrot; France	Dmitry Komornikov; Russia	Yohann Bernard; France
50 m butterfly	Pieter van den Hoogenband; Netherlands	Miloš Milošević; Croatia	(United Kingdom) Mark Foster; Great Britain Lars Frölander; Sweden
100 m butterfly	Lars Frölander; Sweden	(United Kingdom) James Hickman; Great Britain	Denys Sylantyev; Ukraine
200 m butterfly	Franck Esposito; France	Denys Sylantyev; Ukraine	Anatoly Polyakov; Russia
200 m individual medley	Marcel Wouda; Netherlands	Massimiliano Rosolino; Italy	Jani Sievinen; Finland
400 m individual medley	Frederik Hviid; Spain	Michael Halika; Israel	Marcel Wouda; Netherlands
4 × 100 m freestyle relay	Netherlands; Johan Kenkhuis; Mark Veens; Marcel Wouda; Pieter van den Hoogenband	Russia; Denis Pimankov; Sergey Ashihmin; Dmitry Chernyshov; Alexander Popov	Germany; Christian Keller; Lars Merseburg; Christian Tröger; Lars Conrad
4 × 200 m freestyle relay	Germany; Christian Keller; Stefan Pohl; Lars Conrad; Michael Kiedel	Great Britain; Paul Palmer; Gavin Meadows; James Salter; Edward Sinclair	Russia; Maksim Korsunov; Dmitri Kuzmin; Andrey Kapralov; Dmitry Chernyshov
4 × 100 m medley relay	Netherlands; Klaas-Erik Zwering; Marcel Wouda; Stefan Aartsen; Pieter van den Hoogenband	Germany; Stev Theloke; Mark Warnecke; Christian Keller; Christian Tröger	Russia; Sergey Ostapchuk; Dmitry Komornikov; Vladislav Kulikov; Alexander Popov; Sweden; Mattias Ohlin; Patrik Isaksson; Daniel Carlsson; Lars Frölander

=== Women's events ===
Event	Gold	Silver	Bronze
50 m freestyle	Inge de Bruijn; Netherlands	Therese Alshammar; Sweden	(United Kingdom) Alison Sheppard; Great Britain
100 m freestyle	(United Kingdom) Sue Rolph; Great Britain	Inge de Bruijn; Netherlands	Sandra Völker; Germany
200 m freestyle	Camelia Potec; Romania	Kerstin Kielgass; Germany	Natalya Baranovskaya; Belarus
400 m freestyle	Camelia Potec; Romania	Kerstin Kielgass; Germany	Yana Klochkova; Ukraine
800 m freestyle	Hannah Stockbauer; Germany	Kirsten Vlieghuis; Netherlands	Jana Henke; Germany
50 m backstroke	Sandra Völker; Germany	Nina Zhivanevskaya; Spain	Metka Šparovec; Slovenia
100 m backstroke	Sandra Völker; Germany	Nina Zhivanevskaya; Spain	Roxana Maracineanu; France
200 m backstroke	Roxana Maracineanu; France	Yuliya Fomenko; Russia Cathleen Rund; Germany	None
50 m breaststroke	Ágnes Kovács; Hungary	(United Kingdom) Zoë Baker; Great Britain	Janne Schäfer; Germany
100 m breaststroke	Ágnes Kovács; Hungary	Svitlana Bondarenko; Ukraine	Brigitte Becue; Belgium
200 m breaststroke	Ágnes Kovács; Hungary	Beatrice Câșlaru; Romania	Alicja Pęczak; Poland
50 m butterfly	Anna-Karin Kammerling; Sweden	Johanna Sjöberg; Sweden	Chantal Groot; Netherlands
100 m butterfly	Inge de Bruijn; Netherlands	Johanna Sjöberg; Sweden	Diana Mocanu; Romania
200 m butterfly	Mette Jacobsen; Denmark	María Peláez; Spain	Otylia Jędrzejczak; Poland
200 m individual medley	Yana Klochkova; Ukraine	Beatrice Câșlaru; Romania	Sabine Herbst; Germany
400 m individual medley	Yana Klochkova; Ukraine	Beatrice Câșlaru; Romania	Hana Černá; Czech Republic
4 × 100 m freestyle relay	Germany; Katrin Meissner; Antje Buschschulte; Franziska van Almsick; Sandra Völker	Sweden; Louise Jöhncke; Josefin Lillhage; Malin Svahnström; Therese Alshammar	Great Britain; Alison Sheppard; Claire Huddart; Karen Pickering; Sue Rolph
4 × 200 m freestyle relay	Germany; Franziska van Almsick; Silvia Szalai; Hannah Stockbauer; Kerstin Kielgass	Sweden; Josefin Lillhage; Malin Svahnström; Johanna Sjöberg; Louise Jöhncke	Romania; Camelia Potec; Ioana Diaconescu; Simona Păduraru; Beatrice Câșlaru
4 × 100 m medley relay	Sweden; Therese Alshammar; Maria Östling; Johanna Sjöberg; Malin Svahnström	Germany; Sandra Völker; Silvia Pulfrich; Franziska van Almsick; Katrin Meissner	Great Britain; Katy Sexton; Zoë Baker; Sue Rolph; Karen Pickering

== Open water swimming ==
=== Men's events ===
Event	Gold	Silver	Bronze
5 km open water	Yevgeny Bezruchenko (RUS)	Aleksey Akatyev (RUS)	Samuele Pampana (ITA)
25 km open water	Aleksey Akatyev (RUS)	Anton Sanachev (RUS)	André Wilde (GER)

=== Women's events ===
Event	Gold	Silver	Bronze
5 km open water	Peggy Büchse (GER)	Viola Valli (ITA)	Britta Kamrau (GER)
25 km open water	Olga Gusseva (RUS)	Angela Maurer (GER)	Britta Kamrau (GER)

== Diving ==
=== Men's events ===
Event	Gold	Silver	Bronze
1 m springboard	José Miguel Gil; Spain	Andreas Wels; Germany	Stefan Ahrens; Germany
3 m springboard	(United Kingdom) Tony Ally; Great Britain	Imre Lengyel; Hungary	Jukka Piekkanen; Finland
10 m platform	Dmitri Sautin; Russia	Heiko Meyer; Germany	Roman Volodkov; Ukraine
3 m springboard synchro	Donald Miranda; Nicola Marconi; Italy	Holger Schlepps; Alexander Mesch; Germany	(United Kingdom) Tony Ally; Mark Shipman; Great Britain
10 m platform synchro	Jan Hempel; Heiko Meyer; Germany	Igor Lukashin; Vladimir Timoshinin; Russia	(United Kingdom) Leon Taylor; Peter Waterfield; Great Britain

=== Women's events ===
Event	Gold	Silver	Bronze
1 m springboard	Vera Ilyina; Russia	Irina Lashko; Russia	Conny Schmalfuß; Germany
3 m springboard	Vera Ilyina; Russia	Irina Lashko; Russia	Conny Schmalfuß; Germany
10 m platform	Olena Zhupina; Ukraine	Dolores Sáez; Spain	Svetlana Timoshinina; Russia
3 m springboard synchro	Ganna Sorokina; Olena Zhupina; Ukraine	Simona Koch; Conny Schmalfuß; Germany	Odile Arboles-Souchon; Julie Danaux; France
10 m platform synchro	Yevgeniya Olshevskaya; Svetlana Timoshinina; Russia	Anke Piper; Ute Wetzig; Germany	Odile Arboles-Souchon; Julie Danaux; France

== Synchronized swimming ==
Event	Gold	Silver	Bronze
Solo	Olga Brusnikina; Russia	Virginie Dedieu; France	Giovanna Burlando; Italy
Duet	Olga Brusnikina; Mariya Kiselyova; Russia	Virginie Dedieu; Myriam Lignot; France	Giovanna Burlando; Maurizia Cecconi; Italy
Team	Russia; Elena Azarova; Olga Brusnikina; Mariya Kiselyova; Olga Novokshchenova; Irina Pershina; Elena Soya; Yuliya Vasilyeva; Olga Vasyukova	France; Agnes Berthet; Cinthia Bouhier; Virginie Dedieu; Cathy Geoffroy; Rachel le Bozec; Myriam Lignot; Charlotte Massardier; Magali Rathier	Italy; Giada Ballan; Serena Bianchi; Mara Brunetti; Giovanna Burlando; Chiara Cassin; Maurizia Cecconi; Alice Dominici; Alessia Lucchini

== See also ==
- 1999 Men's European Water Polo Championship
- 1999 Women's European Water Polo Championship
