= 1995 European Aquatics Championships =

Water sport competitions

- Host city: Vienna
- Country: Austria
- Sport: 5
- Events: 47
- Opening: 22 August 1995
- Closing: 27 August 1995
- Main venue: Prater Stadium

The 1995 European LC Championships in aquatics were staged in Vienna, Austria from 22–27 August. The competition, organised by the LEN, was held in a temporary pool in the Prater Stadium. The aquatics championships featured contests in swimming, open water swimming, diving, synchronized swimming (women only) and water polo. It was the third time the European Aquatics Championships were held in Vienna, after 1950 and 1974.

== Medal table ==
Rank	Nation	Gold	Silver	Bronze	Total
1	Russia	17	2	4	23
2	Germany	13	13	11	37
3	Hungary	3	7	1	11
4	Belgium	3	1	2	6
5	Finland	3	0	1	4
6	Denmark	2	2	2	6
7	Italy	2	1	6	9
8	Ireland	2	1	0	3
9	Sweden	1	5	2	8
10	Netherlands	1	3	2	6
11	France	0	4	2	6
12	Ukraine	0	3	1	4
13	Great Britain	0	2	5	7
14	Poland	0	2	3	5
15	Romania	0	1	0	1
16	Norway	0	0	2	2
17	Belarus	0	0	1	1
17	Czech Republic	0	0	1	1
17	Greece	0	0	1	1
17	Spain	0	0	1	1
Totals (20 entries)		47	47	48	142

== Swimming ==
=== Men's events ===
Event	Gold		Silver		Bronze	
50 m freestyle	Alexander Popov; Russia	22.25	Christophe Kalfayan; France	22.63	Torsten Spanneberg; Germany	22.66
100 m freestyle	Alexander Popov; Russia	49.10	Torsten Spanneberg; Germany	49.67	Björn Zikarsky; Germany	50.23
200 m freestyle	Jani Sievinen; Finland	1:48.98	Anders Holmertz; Sweden	1:49.12	Antti Kasvio; Finland	1:49.24
400 m freestyle	Steffen Zesner; Germany	3:50.35	Paul Palmer; Great Britain	3:50.43	Anders Holmertz; Sweden	3:51.01
1500 m freestyle	Jörg Hoffmann; Germany	15:11.25	Graeme Smith; Great Britain	15:11.90	Steffen Zesner; Germany	15:20.46
100 m backstroke	Vladimir Selkov; Russia	55.48	Jirka Letzin; Germany	56.24	Stefaan Maene; Belgium	56.32
200 m backstroke	Vladimir Selkov; Russia	1:58.48	Nicolae Butacu; Romania	1:59.96	Adam Ruckwood; Great Britain	2:00.16
100 m breaststroke	Frédérik Deburghgraeve; Belgium	1:01.12	Károly Güttler; Hungary	1:01.38	Andrey Korneyev; Russia	1:01.79
200 m breaststroke	Andrey Korneyev; Russia	2:12.62	Károly Güttler; Hungary	2:12.95	Frédérik Deburghgraeve; Belgium	2:14.01
100 m butterfly	Denis Pankratov; Russia	52.32; WR	Denys Sylantyev; Ukraine	53.37	Rafał Szukała; Poland	53.45
200 m butterfly	Denis Pankratov; Russia	1:56.34	Konrad Gałka; Poland	1:59.50	Chris-Carol Bremer; Germany	1:59.96
200 m individual medley	Jani Sievinen; Finland	1:58.61	Attila Czene; Hungary	2:00.88	Christian Keller; Germany	2:02.24
400 m individual medley	Jani Sievinen; Finland	4:14.75	Marcin Malinski; Poland	4:18.32	Luca Sacchi; Italy	4:18.82
4 × 100 m freestyle relay	Russia; Vladimir Predkin; Roman Shegolov; Roman Yegorov; Alexander Popov	3:18.84	Germany; Christian Tröger; Christian Keller; Torsten Spanneberg; Björn Zikarsky	3:19.76	Sweden; Lars Frölander; Christer Wallin; Fredrik Letzler; Anders Holmertz	3:21.07
4 × 200 m freestyle relay	Germany; Christian Keller; Oliver Lampe; Torsten Spanneberg; Steffen Zesner	7:18.22	Sweden; Christer Wallin; Anders Holmertz; Lars Frölander; Chris Eliasson	7:19.95	Italy; Massimiliano Rosolino; Pier Maria Siciliano; Emanuele Merisi; Emanuele Idini	7:20.96
4 × 100 m medley relay	Russia; Vladimir Selkov; Andrey Korneyev; Denis Pankratov; Alexander Popov	3:38.11; ER	Hungary; Tamás Deutsch; Károly Güttler; Péter Horváth; Attila Czene	3:40.88	Germany; Tino Weber; Mark Warnecke; Fabian Hieronimus; Björn Zikarsky	3:41.55

=== Women's events ===
Event	Gold		Silver		Bronze	
50 m freestyle	Linda Olofsson; Sweden	25.76	Franziska van Almsick; Germany	25.80	Angela Postma; Netherlands	25.86
100 m freestyle	Franziska van Almsick; Germany	55.34	Mette Jacobsen; Denmark	56.02	Karen Pickering; Great Britain	56.05
200 m freestyle	Kerstin Kielgass; Germany	2:00.56	Malin Nilsson; Sweden	2:01.35	Mette Jacobsen; Denmark; Karen Pickering; Great Britain	2:01.52
400 m freestyle	Franziska van Almsick; Germany	4:08.37	Carla Geurts; Netherlands	4:10.73	Irene Dalby; Norway	4:13.44
800 m freestyle	Julia Jung; Germany	8:36.08	Jana Henke; Germany	8:36.68	Irene Dalby; Norway	8:38.82
100 m backstroke	Mette Jacobsen; Denmark	1:02.46	Cathleen Rund; Germany	1:02.91	Nina Zhivanevskaya; Russia	1:03.06
200 m backstroke	Krisztina Egerszegi; Hungary	2:07.24	Dagmar Hase; Germany	2:10.60	Cathleen Rund; Germany	2:10.96
100 m breaststroke	Brigitte Becue; Belgium	1:09.30	Svitlana Bondarenko; Ukraine	1:09.73	Ágnes Kovács; Hungary	1:10.77
200 m breaststroke	Brigitte Becue; Belgium	2:27.60	Svitlana Bondarenko; Ukraine	2:30.50	Alicja Pęczak; Poland	2:30.59
100 m butterfly	Mette Jacobsen; Denmark	1:00.64	Ilaria Tocchini; Italy	1:01.13	Cécile Jeanson; France	1:01.15
200 m butterfly	Michelle Smith; Ireland	2:11.60	Mette Jacobsen; Denmark	2:12.29	Sophia Skou; Denmark	2:13.31
200 m individual medley	Michelle Smith; Ireland	2:15.27	Brigitte Becue; Belgium	2:16.15	Alicja Pęczak; Poland	2:17.42
400 m individual medley	Krisztina Egerszegi; Hungary	4:40.33	Michelle Smith; Ireland	4:42.81	Cathleen Rund; Germany	4:46.22
4 × 100 m freestyle relay	Germany; Franziska van Almsick; Simone Osygus; Kerstin Kielgass; Daniela Hunger	3:43.22	Sweden; Louise Jöhncke; Louise Karlsson; Linda Olofsson; Ellenor Svensson	3:45.21	Great Britain; Sue Rolph; Claire Huddart; Alex Bennett; Karen Pickering	3:46.89
4 × 200 m freestyle relay	Germany; Dagmar Hase; Julia Jung; Kerstin Kielgass; Franziska van Almsick	8:06.11	Netherlands; Carla Geurts; Minouche Smit; Patricia Stokkers; Kirsten Vlieghuis	8:10.17	Great Britain; Vickey Horner; Claire Huddart; Katja Goddard; Alex Bennett	8:14.31
4 × 100 m medley relay	Germany; Cathleen Rund; Jana Dörries; Julia Voitowitch; Franziska van Almsick	4:09.97	Hungary; Krisztina Egerszegi; Ágnes Kovács; Edit Klocker; Gyöngyvér Lakos	4:12.00	Spain; María Tato; María Olay; María Peláez; Claudia Franco	4:12.52

== Open water swimming ==
=== Men's events ===
Event	Gold		Silver		Bronze	
5 km open water	Aleksey Akatyev; Russia	55:00,3	Christof Wandratsch; Germany	56:06,8	Samuele Pampana; Italy	56:10,3
25 km open water	Christof Wandratsch; Germany	5:11:36,3	Aleksey Akatyev; Russia	5:13:49,8	Stéphane Lecat; France	5:14:46,4

=== Women's events ===
Event	Gold		Silver		Bronze	
5 km open water	Rita Kovács; Hungary	1:00:38,3	Peggy Büchse; Germany	1:00:50,8	Valeria Casprini; Italy	1:01:07,6
25 km open water	Peggy Büchse; Germany	5:32:36,4	Edith van Dijk; Netherlands	5:36:05,5	Yvetta Hlaváčová; Czech Republic	5:38:08,3

== Diving ==
=== Men's events ===
Event	Gold		Silver		Bronze	
1 m springboard	Edwin Jongejans; Netherlands	420.75	Joakim Andersson; Sweden	387.60	Boris Lietzow; Germany	379.26
3 m springboard	Dmitri Sautin; Russia	670.38	Jan Hempel; Germany	634.05	Roman Volodkov; Ukraine	615.81
10 m platform	Vladimir Timoshinin; Russia	673.83	Jan Hempel; Germany	662.46	Dmitri Sautin; Russia	648.84

=== Women's events ===
Event	Gold		Silver		Bronze	
1 m springboard	Vera Ilyina; Russia	275.25	Dörte Lindner; Germany	271.20	Svetlana Alekseyeva; Belarus	240.72
3 m springboard	Vera Ilyina; Russia	523.23	Yuliya Pakhalina; Russia	520.20	Claudia Bockner; Germany	518.64
10 m platform	Ute Wetzig; Germany	444.24	Conny Schmalfuss; Germany	435.84	Svetlana Timoshinina; Russia	431.55

== Synchronized swimming ==
Event	Gold		Silver		Bronze	
Solo	Olga Sedakova; Russia	99.160	Marianne Aeschbacher; France	97.520	Christina Thalassinidou; Greece	95.360
Duet	Elena Azarova; Mariya Kiselyova; Russia	98.880	Marianne Aeschbacher; Myriam Lignot; France	96.920	Giovanna Burlando; Manuela Carnini; Italy	96.040
Team	Russia; Elena Antonova; Elena Azarova; Olga Brusnikina; Mariya Kiselyova; Gana Maximova; Olga Novokshchenova; Yuliya Pankratova; Olga Sedakova	98.880	France; Marianne Aeschbacher; Agnes Berthet; Julie Fabre; Celine Leveque; Myriam Lignot; Isabelle Manable; Charlotte Massardier; Magali Rathier	97.160	Italy; Giada Ballan; Serena Bianchi; Giovanna Burlando; Mara Brunetti; Manuela Carnini; Maurizia Cecconi; Paola Celli; Roberta Farinelli	95.480

== Water polo ==
=== Men's team event ===
Event	Gold	Silver	Bronze
Team competition	Italy	Hungary	Germany

=== Women's team event ===
Event	Gold	Silver	Bronze
Team Competition	Italy	Hungary	Netherlands
