= 2006 FINA Synchronised Swimming World Cup =

International synchronised swimming competition

The 11th FINA Synchronised Swimming World Cup was held September 14–17, 2006 in Yokohama, Japan. It featured swimmers from 29 nations, swimming in four events: Solo, Duet, Team and (for the first time) Free Combination.

== Participating nations ==
Nations who swam in one or more events at the 2006 Synchro World Cup were:

- Australia
- Austria
- Belarus
- Brazil
- Canada
- China
- Costa Rica
- Czech Republic
- Egypt
- France
- Greece
- Indonesia
- Israel
- Italy
- Japan
- Kazakhstan
- Liechtenstein
- Macao
- Malaysia
- New Zealand
- Russia
- Slovakia
- South Korea
- Spain
- Switzerland
- Ukraine
- USA
- Uzbekistan
- Vietnam

== Results ==
Event	Gold		Silver		Bronze	
Solo	Natalia Ishchenko; Russia	98.750	Gemma Mengual; Spain	97.550	Emiko Suzuki; Japan	96.850
Duet	Anastasia Ermakova; Anastasia Davydova; Russia	98.900	Gemma Mengual; Paola Tirados; Spain	98.050	Emiko Suzuki; Saho Harada; Japan	97.200
Team	Russia: Mariya Gromova; Natalia Ishchenko; Elvira Khassianova; Olga Kuzhela; Anna Nasekina; Elena Ovtchinnikova; Svetlana Romashina; Anna Shorina	99.100	Japan: Ai Aoki; Saho Harada; Naoko Kawashima; Hiromi Kobayashi; Erika Komura; Takako Konishi; Ayako Matsumura; Emiko Suzuki	97.750	Spain: Alba Cabello; Raquel Corral; Andrea Fuentes; Tina Fuentes; Laura Lopez; Gisela Moron; Irina Rodriguez; Paola Tirados	97.600
Free Combination	Russia: Anastasia Ermakova; Anastasia Davydova; Mariya Gromova; Natalia Ishchenko; Elvira Khassianova; Olga Kuzhela; Anna Nasekina; Elena Ovtchinnikova; Svetlana Romashina; Anna Shorina	98.000	Japan: Reiki Fujimori; Saho Harada; Naoko Kawashima; Hiromi Kobayashi; Erika Komura; Takako Konishi; Ayako Matsumura; Emiko Suzuki; Erika Suzuki; Masako Tachibana	98.000	Spain: Alba Cabello; Raquel Corral; Andrea Fuentes; Tina Fuentes; Thais Henriquez; Laura Lopez; Gemma Mengual; Gisela Moron; Irina Rodriguez; Paola Tirados	97.000

== Final standings ==
Place	Nation	Points
1	Russia	395.700
2	Spain	390.200
3	Japan	389.800
4	Canada	376.835
5	Italy	372.050
6	Ukraine	367.700
7	France	353.650
8	Switzerland	350.650
9	Brazil	349.050
10	United States	266.350
11	Australia	242.550
12	Egypt	241.700

Also ranked, but with no points listed were: 13th-Macau, 14th-China, 15th-Greece, 16th-Israel, 17th-Czech Republic, 18th-Slovakia, 19th-New Zealand, 20th-Vietnam, 21st-South Korea, 22nd-Kazakhstan, 23rd-Belarus, 24th-Liechtenstein, 25th-Uzbekistan, 26th-Malaysia, 27th-Costa Rica, 28th-Indonesia.
