= Synchronised swimming at the 2005 World Aquatics Championships =

These are the results from the synchronised swimming competition at the 2005 World Aquatics Championships.

== Medal table ==
Rank	Nation	Gold	Silver	Bronze	Total
1	Russia (RUS)	3	1	0	4
2	France (FRA)	1	0	0	1
3	Japan (JPN)	0	2	1	3
4	Spain (ESP)	0	1	3	4
Totals (4 entries)		4	4	4	12

== Medal summary ==
Event	Gold	Silver	Bronze
Solo routine	Virginie Dedieu (FRA); 99.001	Natalia Ischenko (RUS); 98.250	Gemma Mengual (ESP); 97.417
Duet routine	Anastasia Davydova (RUS); Anastasia Ermakova (RUS); 99.084	Gemma Mengual (ESP); Paola Tirados (ESP); 97.417	Saho Harada (JPN); Emiko Suzuki (JPN); 97.334
Team routine	Russia (RUS); Maria Gromova; Natalia Ischenko; Elvira Khasyanova; Olga Kuzhela; Olga Larkina; Elena Ovchinnikova; Svetlana Romashina; Anna Shorina; 99.334	Japan (JPN); Saho Harada; Naoko Kawashima; Kanako Kitao; Hiromi Kobayashi; Erika Komura; Takako Konishi; Ayako Matsumura; Emiko Suzuki; Masako Tachibana; 97.834	Spain (ESP); Raquel Corral; Andrea Fuentes; Tina Fuentes; Thais Henríquez; Gemma Mengual; Irina Rodríguez; Paola Tirados; Christina Violan; 97.750
Combination routine	Russia (RUS); Anastasia Davydova; Anastasia Ermakova; Maria Gromova; Natalia Ischenko; Elvira Khasyanova; Olga Kuzhela; Olga Larkina; Elena Ovchinnikova; Svetlana Romashina; Anna Shorina; 99.333	Japan (JPN); Saho Harada; Naoko Kawashima; Kanako Kitao; Hiromi Kobayashi; Erika Komura; Takako Konishi; Ayako Matsumura; Emiko Suzuki; Masako Tachibana; 97.833	Spain (ESP); Raquel Corral; Andrea Fuentes; Tina Fuentes; Thais Henríquez; Gemma Mengual; Gisela Morón; Irina Rodríguez; Paola Tirados; Christina Violan; 97.167
