= Synchronized swimming at the 2008 Summer Olympics =

Synchronized swimming at the Games of the XXIX Olympiad
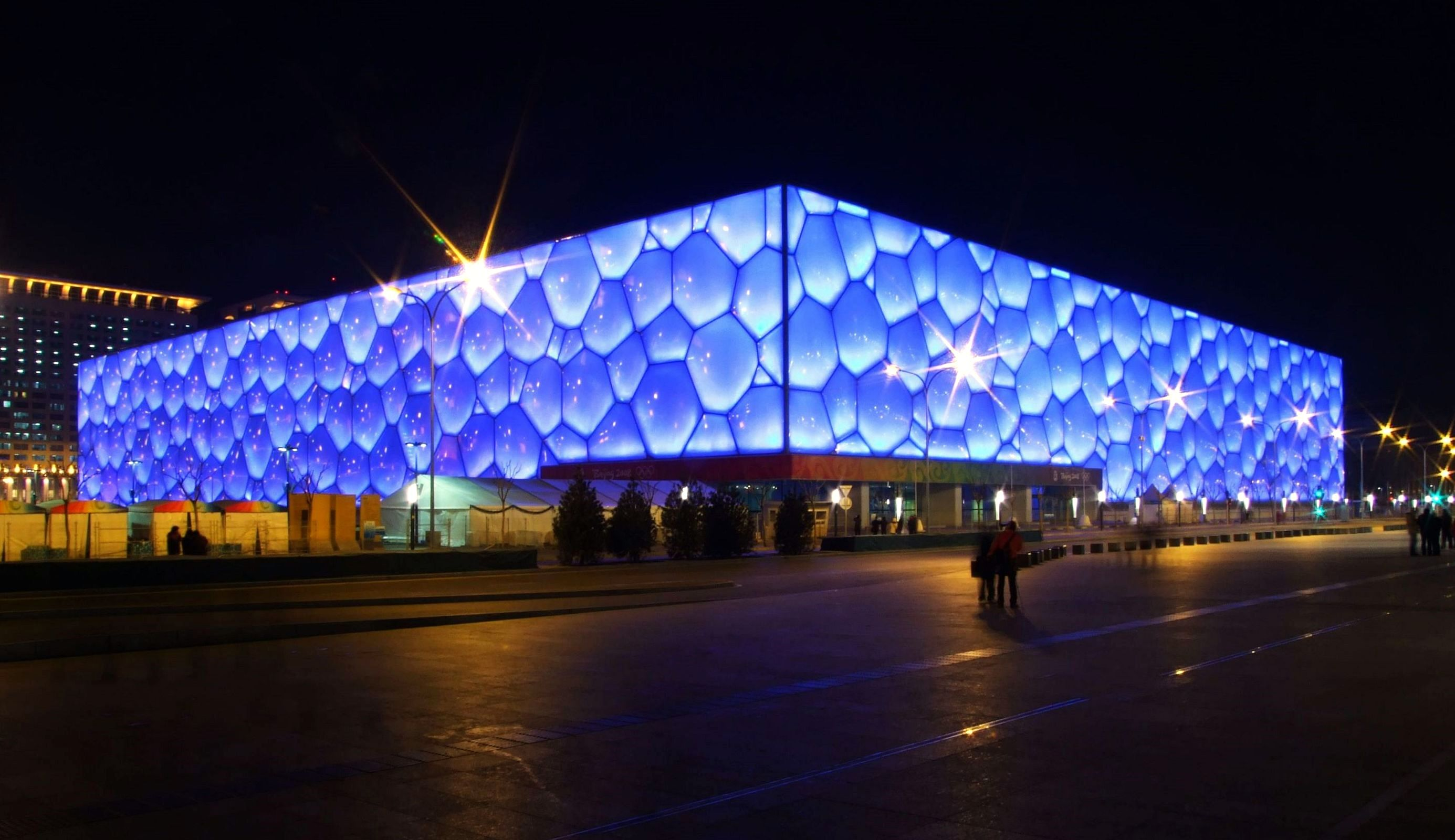
- Beijing National Aquatics Center a.k.a. The Water Cube
- Venue: National Aquatics Centre
- Dates: 18 to 23 August 2008
- Competitors: 104 from 24 nations

Synchronized swimming competitions at the 2008 Summer Olympics in Beijing took place from August 18 to August 23, at the Beijing National Aquatics Center in China.

== Medalists ==
Event	Gold	Silver	Bronze
Duet	Anastasia Davydova and Anastasiya Yermakova; Russia	Andrea Fuentes and Gemma Mengual; Spain	Saho Harada and Emiko Suzuki; Japan
Team	Russia; Anastasia Davydova; Anastasia Ermakova; Maria Gromova; Natalia Ishchenko; Elvira Khasyanova; Olga Kuzhela; Yelena Ovchinnikova; Anna Shorina; Svetlana Romashina	Spain; Alba María Cabello; Raquel Corral; Andrea Fuentes; Gemma Mengual; Thaïs Henríquez; Laura López; Gisela Morón; Irina Rodríguez; Paola Tirados	China; Gu Beibei; Huang Xuechen; Jiang Tingting; Jiang Wenwen; Liu Ou; Luo Xi; Sun Qiuting; Wang Na; Zhang Xiaohuan

== Medal table ==
Rank	Nation	Gold	Silver	Bronze	Total
1	Russia	2	0	0	2
2	Spain	0	2	0	2
3	China	0	0	1	1
3	Japan	0	0	1	1
Totals (4 entries)		2	2	2	6

== Schedule ==
All times are China Standard Time (UTC+8)

Day	Time	Event
Monday, August 18, 2008	15:00-16:40	Duet Technical Routine
Tuesday, August 19, 2008	15:00-17:10	Duet Free Routine (Preliminary)
Wednesday, August 20, 2008	15:00-16:30	Duet Free Routine (Final)
Friday, August 22, 2008	15:00-15:45	Team Technical Routine
Saturday, August 23, 2008	15:00-15:45	Team Free Routine (Final)

== Qualifying criteria ==
=== Team ===
Event	Date	Venue	Vacancies	Qualified
Host nation	-	-	1	China
European Synchronized Swimming Cup	May 30 - June 2, 2007	(Italy) Rome	1	Russia
2007 Pan American Games	July 13–29, 2007	(Brazil) Rio de Janeiro	1	United States
African Championship	December 4–5, 2007	(Egypt) Cairo	1	Egypt
Oceania Qualifying Tournament	July 19–22, 2007	(Switzerland) Zürich	1	Australia
Olympic Qualifying Tournament	April 16–20, 2008	(China) Beijing	3	Spain; Japan; Canada
TOTAL			8	

=== Duet ===
Event	Date	Venue	Vacancies	Qualified
NOCs qualified for the team event	-	-	8	China; Russia; United States; Egypt; Australia; Spain; Japan; Canada
Oceania Qualifying Tournament	July 19–22, 2007	(Switzerland) Zürich	1	New Zealand
Olympic Qualifying Tournament	April 16–20, 2008	(China) Beijing	15	Italy; Ukraine; Greece; Netherlands; Switzerland; Brazil; France; Israel; North Korea; Kazakhstan; Mexico; Great Britain; Belarus; Czech Republic; Austria
TOTAL			24	
