= Synchronized swimming at the 2008 Summer Olympics – Women's team =

Women's team at the Games of the XXIX Olympiad
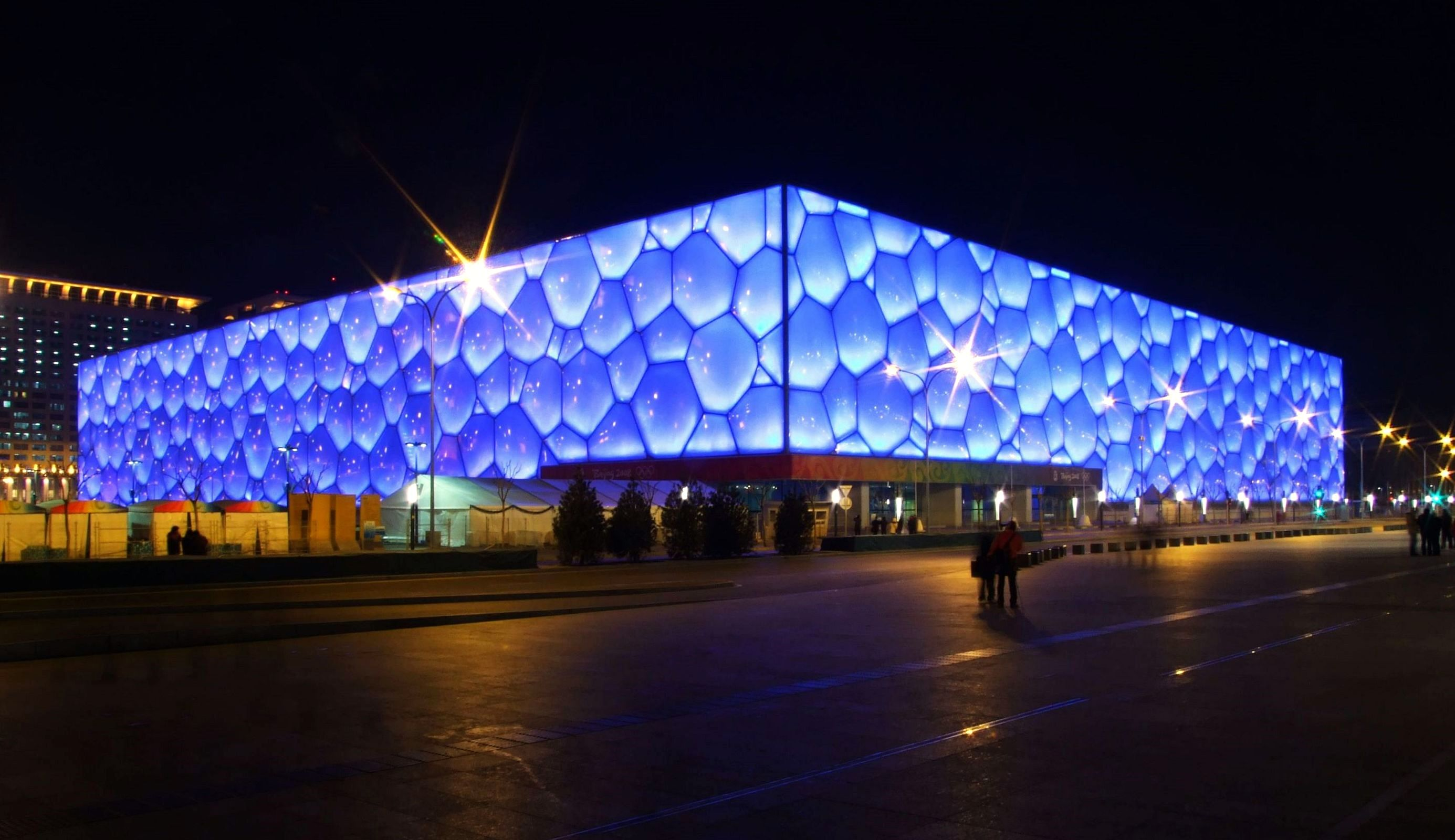
- Aquatics Center in Beijing
- Venue: Beijing National Aquatics Center
- Date: 22–23 August
- Competitors: 64 from 8 nations
- Winning points: 99.500

Medalists
1st place, gold medalist(s)		Russia; Anastasia Davydova, Anastasia Ermakova, Mariya Gromova, Natalia Ishchenko, Elvira Khasyanova, Olga Kuzhela, Svetlana Romashina, Anna Shorina, Yelena Ovchinnikova
2nd place, silver medalist(s)		Spain; Alba Cabello, Raquel Corral, Andrea Fuentes, Thaïs Henríquez, Laura López, Gemma Mengual, Gisela Morón, Irina Rodríguez, Paola Tirados
3rd place, bronze medalist(s)		China; Gu Beibei, Huang Xuechen, Jiang Tingting, Jiang Wenwen, Liu Ou, Luo Xi, Sun Qiuting, Wang Na, Zhang Xiaohuan

The women's team event at the 2008 Summer Olympics in Beijing, China, took place at the Beijing National Aquatics Center from 22 to 23 August. The Russian squad had displayed their complex choreography with an unmatched precision in the free routine to defend their Olympic title for the third straight victory, having received a nearly perfect mark of 99.500 by the judges. Spain picked up a silver with 98.251 points, while the Chinese squad surpassed the 2004 Olympic silver medal team Japan by nearly a two-point advantage to claim a bronze for the host nation's first ever Olympic medal, recording a composite score of 97.334.

Eight teams competed, each consisting of eight swimmers (from a total team of nine swimmers). There was a single round of competition. Each team presents two routines: a technical routine and a free routine. The technical routine consists of twelve required elements, which must be completed in order and within a time of between 2 minutes 35 seconds and 3 minutes 5 seconds. The free routine has no restrictions other than time; this routine must last between 3 minutes 45 seconds and 4 minutes 15 seconds.

For each routine, the team is judged by two panels of five judges each. One panel is the technical jury, the other is the artistic jury. Each judge gives marks of between 0 and 10. The highest and lowest score from each panel are dropped, leaving a total of six scores which are then summed to give the routine's score. The scores of the two routines are then added to give a final score for the team.

== Schedule ==
All times are Beijing Standard Time UTC+8

Date	Time	Round
Friday, 22 August 2008	15:00	Final technical routine
Saturday, 23 August 2008	15:00	Final free routine

== Results ==
Rank	Country	Athlete	Technical	Free	Total
1st place, gold medalist(s)	Russia	Anastasia Davydova, Anastasia Ermakova, Maria Gromova, Natalia Ishchenko, Elvira Khasyanova, Olga Kuzhela, Svetlana Romashina, Anna Shorina, Yelena Ovchinnikova	49.500	50.000	99.500
2nd place, silver medalist(s)	Spain	Alba Cabello, Raquel Corral, Andrea Fuentes, Thaïs Henríquez, Laura López, Gemma Mengual, Irina Rodríguez, Paola Tirados, Gisela Morón	48.917	49.334	98.251
3rd place, bronze medalist(s)	China	Gu Beibei, Jiang Tingting, Jiang Wenwen, Liu Ou, Luo Xi, Sun Qiuting, Wang Na, Zhang Xiaohuan, Huang Xuechen	48.584	48.750	97.334
4	Canada	Marie-Pier Boudreau Gagnon, Jessika Dubuc, Marie-Pierre Gagné, Dominika Kopcik, Eve Lamoureux, Tracy Little, Élise Marcotte, Jennifer Song, Isabelle Rampling	47.584	48.084	95.668
5	United States	Brooke Abel, Janet Culp, Kate Hooven, Christina Jones, Andrea Nott, Annabelle Orme, Jill Penner, Kim Probst, Becky Kim	47.584	47.750	95.334
5	Japan	Ai Aoki, Saho Harada, Naoko Kawashima, Hiromi Kobayashi, Erika Komura, Ayako Matsumura, Emiko Suzuki, Masako Tachibana, Yumiko Ishiguro	48.167	47.167	95.334
7	Australia	Eloise Amberger, Coral Bentley, Sarah Bombell, Myriam Glez, Erika Leal-Ramirez, Tarren Otte, Samantha Reid, Bethany Walsh, Tamika Domrow	40.417	41.750	82.167
8	Egypt	Reem Abdalazem, Aziza Abdelfattah, Hagar Badran, Dalia El Gebaly, Shaza El-Sayed, Youmna Khallaf, Mai Mohamed, Nouran Saleh, Lamyaa Badawi	39.750	41.083	80.833
