= 2002 European Aquatics Championships =

Water sport competitions

26th European Aquatics Championships
- Host city: Berlin, Germany
- Date(s): 29 July–4 August 2002
- Events: 57

The 2002 LEN European Championships were held in Berlin, Germany from Monday 29 July to Sunday 4 August 2002 at the Berlin Eurosportpark in the German capital. The 26th edition of the event was organised by the LEN. A total number of 786 swimmers competed, from 38 countries. The event included disciplines of swimming (long course), open water swimming, diving, and synchronized swimming (women). A 10 km open water event, for both men and women was introduced in the open water swimming competition, this was held in Potsdam.

== Medal table ==
* Host nation (Germany)

Rank	Nation	Gold	Silver	Bronze	Total
1	Germany*	15	12	9	36
2	Russia	11	7	8	26
3	Italy	7	6	7	20
4	Ukraine	6	5	6	17
5	Sweden	4	3	4	11
6	Netherlands	4	0	2	6
7	France	2	3	4	9
8	Poland	2	1	1	4
9	Finland	2	0	0	2
10	Spain	1	5	2	8
11	Austria	1	2	1	4
12	Slovakia	1	2	0	3
13	Croatia	1	0	2	3
14	Hungary	0	8	1	9
15	Belarus	0	1	6	7
16	Romania	0	1	2	3
17	Switzerland	0	1	0	1
18	Greece	0	0	1	1
18	Slovenia	0	0	1	1
Totals (19 entries)		57	57	57	171

== Swimming ==
=== Men's events ===
Event	Gold		Silver		Bronze	
50 m freestyle	Bartosz Kizierowski; Poland	22.18	Lorenzo Vismara; Italy	22.26	Oleksandr Volynets; Ukraine	22.31
100 m freestyle	Pieter van den Hoogenband; Netherlands	47.86; CR	Aleksandr Popov; Russia	48.94	Duje Draganja; Croatia	49.31
200 m freestyle	Pieter van den Hoogenband; Netherlands	1:44.89; ER	Emiliano Brembilla; Italy	1:46.94	Massimiliano Rosolino; Italy	1:47.98
400 m freestyle	Emiliano Brembilla; Italy	3:46.60	Massimiliano Rosolino; Italy	3:48.70	Dragoş Coman; Romania	3:48.78
1500 m freestyle	Yuri Prilukov; Russia	15:03.88	Christian Minotti; Italy	15:04.16	Ihor Chervynskyy; Ukraine	15:07.65
50 m backstroke	Thomas Rupprath; Germany	25.05	Stev Theloke; Germany	25.12	Bartosz Kizierowski; Poland	25.52
100 m backstroke	Stev Theloke; Germany	54.42; ER	Markus Rogan; Austria	54.54	Pierre Roger; France	54.89
200 m backstroke	Gordan Kožulj; Croatia	1:58.70	Markus Rogan; Austria	1:58.83	Marko Strahija; Croatia	1:58.89
50 m breaststroke	Oleh Lisohor; Ukraine	27.18; WR	Mihály Flaskay; Hungary	27.51	Károly Güttler; Hungary	27.85
100 m breaststroke	Oleh Lisohor; Ukraine	1:00.29; CR	Roman Sludnov; Russia	1:00.72	Hugues Duboscq; France	1:01.04
200 m breaststroke	Davide Rummolo; Italy	2:11.37; CR	Yohan Bernard; France	2:11.77	Roman Sludnov; Russia	2:11.82
50 m butterfly	Jere Hård; Finland	23.50; ER	Thomas Rupprath; Germany	23.78	Lars Frölander; Sweden	23.85
100 m butterfly	Thomas Rupprath; Germany	51.94; CR	Andriy Serdinov; Ukraine	52.17	Denys Sylantyev; Ukraine	52.36
200 m butterfly	Franck Esposito; France	1:55.18; CR	Denys Sylantyev; Ukraine	1:55.42; NR	Anatoly Polyakov; Russia	1:55.62
200 m individual medley	Jani Sievinen; Finland	1:59.30	Alessio Boggiatto; Italy	1:59.83	Markus Rogan; Austria	2:00.50
400 m individual medley	Alessio Boggiatto; Italy	4:13.19; CR	István Batházi; Hungary	4:17.33	Nicolas Rostoucher; France	4:19.19
4 × 100 m freestyle relay	Germany; Lars Conrad (50.23); Stefan Herbst (48.83); Torsten Spanneberg (49.26); Stephan Kunzelmann (49.35); Leif Marten Krueger^{[a]} Jens Thiele^{[a]}	3:17.67	Sweden; Eric la Fleur (50.63); Stefan Nystrand (48.83); Lars Frölander (49.26); Mattias Ohlin (49.35); Erik Dorch^{[a]} Jonas Tilly^{[a]}	3:17.75; NR	Italy; Lorenzo Vismara (49.45); Christian Galenda (49.48); Michele Garcia (49.82); Simone Cercato (49.45); Pietro Deriu^{[a]} Andrea Beccari^{[a]} Matteo Pelliciani^{[a]}	3:18.20
4 × 200 m freestyle relay	Italy; Matteo Pelliciari (1:48.39); Emiliano Brembilla (1:47.73); Federico Cappellazzo (1:48.44); Massimiliano Rosolino (1:47.62)	7:12.18; CR	Germany; Moritz Zimmer (1:51.25); Stefan Pohl (1:49.17); Lars Conrad (1:49.01); Stefan Herbst (1:48.16)	7:17.59	Greece; Thanasis Oikonomou (1:49.50); Nikos Xylouris (1:49.82); Ioannis Kokkodis (1:49.73); Spyridon Gianniotis (1:51.62)	7:20.67; NR
4 × 100 m medley relay	Russia; Evgeny Aleshin (56.50); Roman Sludnov (1:00.04); Igor Marchenko (51.82); Aleksandr Popov (47.85); Arkady Vyatchanin^{[a]} Roman Ivanovsky^{[a]} Anatoly Polyakov^{[a]} Maxim Skrynnikov^{[a]}	3:36.21; CR, NR	France; Pierre Roger (55.15); Hugues Duboscq (1:00.26); Franck Esposito (52.32); Romain Barnier (48.82); Simon Dufour^{[a]}	3:36.55; NR	Germany; Stev Theloke (55.01); Jens Kruppa (1:01.36); Thomas Rupprath (51.74); Stefan Herbst (48.94); Lars Conrad^{[a]}	3:37.05

^{a} Swimmers who participated in the heats only and received medals.

=== Women's events ===
Event	Gold		Silver		Bronze	
50 m freestyle	Therese Alshammar; Sweden	24.84	Martina Moravcová; Slovakia	25.09	Aliaksandra Herasimenia; Belarus	25.24
100 m freestyle	Franziska van Almsick; Germany	54.39; CR	Martina Moravcová; Slovakia	54.61	Alena Popchanka; Belarus	54.62
200 m freestyle	Franziska van Almsick; Germany	1:56.64; WR	Camelia Potec; Romania	1:57.80	Alena Popchanka; Belarus	1:57.91
400 m freestyle	Yana Klochkova; Ukraine	4:07.10; NR	Éva Risztov; Hungary	4:07.24; NR	Camelia Potec; Romania	4:09.49
800 m freestyle	Jana Henke; Germany	8:23.83	Éva Risztov; Hungary	8:28.06; NR	Hannah Stockbauer; Germany	8:30.97
50 m backstroke	Nina Zhivanevskaya; Spain	28.58; CR	Sandra Völker; Germany	28.81	Aliaksandra Herasimenia; Belarus	28.86
100 m backstroke	Stanislava Komarova; Russia	1:01.40	Sandra Völker; Germany	1:01.42	Antje Buschschulte; Germany	1:01.56
200 m backstroke	Stanislava Komarova; Russia	2:09.49	Nina Zhivanevskaya; Spain	2:10.27	Iryna Amshennikova; Ukraine	2:11.59
50 m breaststroke	Emma Igelström; Sweden	31.17; CR	Svitlana Bondarenko; Ukraine	31.77	Yelena Bogomazova; Russia	32.10
100 m breaststroke	Emma Igelström; Sweden	1:07.87; CR	Svitlana Bondarenko; Ukraine	1:09.28	Yelena Bogomazova; Russia	1:09.53
200 m breaststroke	Mirna Jukić; Austria	2:25.83	Anne Poleska; Germany	2:27.37	Emma Igelström; Sweden	2:27.61
50 m butterfly	Anna-Karin Kammerling; Sweden	25.57; WR	Daniela Samulski; Germany	26.86	Chantal Groot; Netherlands	26.91
100 m butterfly	Martina Moravcová; Slovakia	57.20; CR, NR	Otylia Jędrzejczak; Poland	57.97	Anna-Karin Kammerling; Sweden	58.94
200 m butterfly	Otylia Jędrzejczak; Poland	2:05.78; WR	Éva Risztov; Hungary	2:08.24	Annika Mehlhorn; Germany	2:09.37
200 m individual medley	Yana Klochkova; Ukraine	2:11.59; CR	Hanna Shcherba; Belarus	2:13.04	Alenka Kejžar; Slovenia	2:14.24
400 m individual medley	Yana Klochkova; Ukraine	4:35.10; CR	Éva Risztov; Hungary	4:36.17; NR	Nicole Hetzer; Germany	4:42.22
4 × 100 m freestyle relay	Germany; Katrin Meissner (54.82); Petra Dallmann (53.95); Sandra Völker (53.59); Franziska van Almsick (53.64); Alessa Ries^{[a]} Meike Freitag^{[a]} Britta Steffen^{[a]}	3:36.00; WR	Sweden; Josefin Lillhage (55.75); Johanna Sjöberg (55.57); Anna-Karin Kammerling (54.81); Therese Alshammar (54.53); Lisa Wanberg^{[a]} Malin Svahnström^{[a]} Cathrin Carlzon^{[a]}	3:40.66	Netherlands; Manon van Rooijen (55.83); Marleen Veldhuis (55.21); Chantal Groot (55.90); Wilma van Hofwegen (55.04)	3:41.98
4 × 200 m freestyle relay	Germany; Petra Dallmann (2:00.29); Alessa Ries (2:00.70); Hannah Stockbauer (2:00.18); Franziska van Almsick (1:57.90)	7:59.07	Spain; Laura Roca (2:01.47); Melissa Caballero (2:01.88); Erika Villaécija (2:01.85); Tatiana Rouba (2:00.63)	8:05.83; NR	Sweden; Josefin Lillhage (2:01.67); Johanna Sjöberg (2:01.61); Lisa Wanberg (2:02.96); Ida Mattsson (2:02.22)	8:08.46
4 × 100 m medley relay	Germany; Antje Buschschulte (1:01.38); Simone Weiler (1:08.65); Franziska van Almsick (57.48); Sandra Völker (54.03); Daniela Samulski^{[a]} Petra Dallmann^{[a]}	4:01.64; ER	Sweden; Therese Alshammar (1:04.33); Emma Igelström (1:08.16); Anna-Karin Kammerling (58.80); Johanna Sjöberg (54.86); Jennie Lindh^{[a]} Josefin Lillhage^{[a]}	4:06.15	Ukraine; Iryna Amshennikova (1:02.34); Svitlana Bondarenko (1:08.91); Yana Klochkova (59.59); Olga Mukomol (55.38); Mariya Ohurtsova^{[a]}	4:06.22; NR

^{a} Swimmers who participated in the heats only and received medals.

== Open water swimming ==
=== Men's events ===
Event	Gold	Silver	Bronze
5 km open water	Luca Baldini (ITA)	Thomas Lurz (GER)	Stefano Rubaudo (ITA)
10 km open water	Vladimir Dyatchin (RUS)	Yevgeniy Kochkarov (RUS)	Luca Baldini (ITA)
25 km open water	Yuri Kudinov (RUS)	Gilles Rondy (FRA)	David Meca (ESP)

=== Women's events ===
Event	Gold	Silver	Bronze
5 km open water	Viola Valli (ITA)	Hanna Miluska (SUI)	Nadine Pastor (GER)
10 km open water	Edith van Dijk (NED)	Angela Maurer (GER)	Britta Kamrau (GER)
25 km open water	Edith van Dijk (NED)	Olesiya Shalygina (RUS)	Natalia Pankina (RUS)

== Diving ==
=== Men's events ===
Event	Gold	Silver	Bronze
1 m springboard	Nicola Marconi; Italy	José Miguel Gil; Spain	Christian Löffler; Germany
3 m springboard	Dmitri Sautin; Russia	Andreas Wels; Germany	Vasiliy Lisovskiy; Russia
10 m platform	Heiko Meyer; Germany	Imre Lengyel; Hungary	Aliaksandr Varlamau; Belarus
3 m springboard synchro	Dmitri Baibakov; Dmitri Sautin; Russia	Tobias Schellenberg; Andreas Wels; Germany	Nicola Marconi; Tommaso Marconi; Italy
10 m platform synchro	Anton Zakharov; Roman Volodkov; Ukraine	Imre Lengyel; András Hajnal; Hungary	Aliaksandr Varlamau; Andrei Mamontov; Belarus

=== Women's events ===
Event	Gold	Silver	Bronze
1 m springboard	Heike Fischer; Germany	Vera Ilyina; Russia	Natalya Umyskova; Russia
3 m springboard	Yuliya Pakhalina; Russia	Ditte Kotzian; Germany	Conny Schmalfuß; Germany
10 m platform	Anke Piper; Germany	Tania Cagnotto; Italy	Olha Leonova; Ukraine
3 m springboard synchro	Ditte Kotzian; Conny Schmalfuß; Germany	Vera Ilyina; Yuliya Pakhalina; Russia	Tania Cagnotto; Maria Marconi; Italy
10 m platform synchro	Ditte Kotzian; Annett Gamm; Germany	Olha Leonova; Olena Zhupina; Ukraine	Yevgeniya Olshevskaya; Svetlana Timoshinina; Russia

== Synchronized swimming ==
Event	Gold	Silver	Bronze
Solo	Virginie Dedieu; France	Anastasia Davydova; Russia	Gemma Mengual; Spain
Duet	Anastasia Davydova; Anastasiya Yermakova; Russia	Gemma Mengual; Paola Tirados; Spain	Virginie Dedieu; Myriam Glez; France
Team	Russia; Youlia Chestakovitch; Anastasia Davydova; Anastasia Ermakova; Maria Gromova; Elvira Khasyanova; Elena Ovtchinnikova; Anna Shorina; Irina Tolkatcheva	Spain; Raquel Corral; Andrea Fuentes; Tina Fuentes; Gemma Mengual; Ana Montero; Irina Rodriguez; Alicia Sanz; Paola Tirados	Italy; Eva Balzarotti; Monica Cirulli; Joey Paccagnella; Elisa Plaisant; Beatrice Spaziani; Lorena Zaffalon; Laura Zanazza; Christina Zarfati
