= 2006 European Aquatics Championships =

Water sport competitions

- Host city: (Hungary) Budapest
- Date: 26 July-6 August 2006

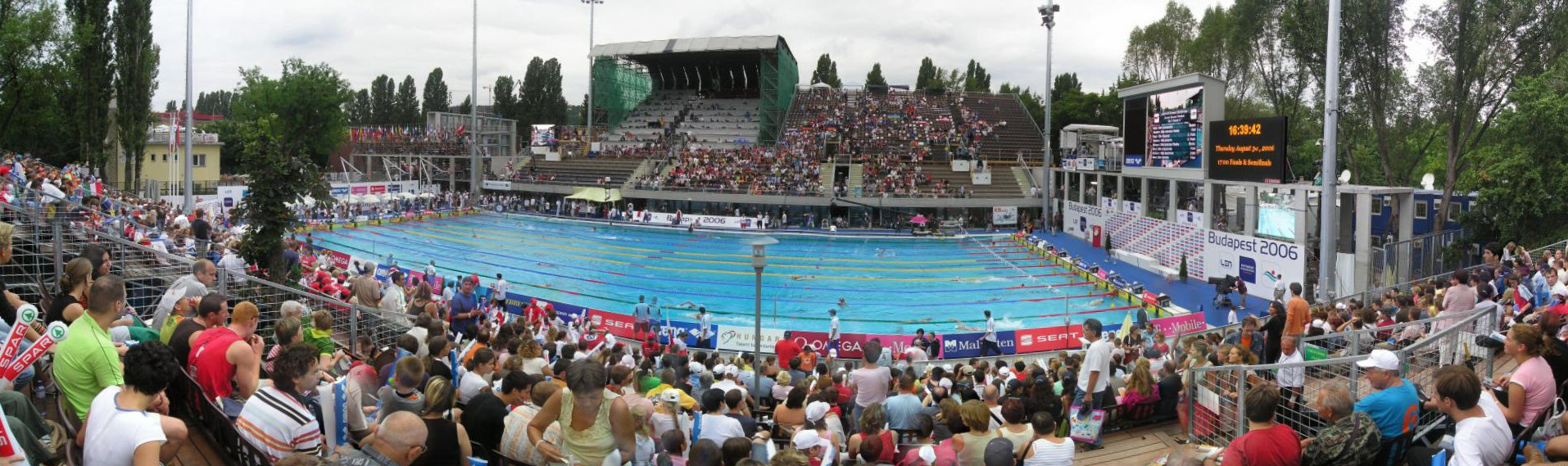
Swimming pool just before the finales on 3rd of August 2006

The 2006 European Swimming Championships were held in Budapest, Hungary, from 26 July – 6 August 2006. Disciplines include swimming, diving, synchronised swimming (synchro) and open water swimming. European Water Polo Championships for 2006 were also organized by LEN, but held separately.

Competition dates by discipline were:

- Swimming: 31 July – 6 August
- Diving: 1–6 August
- Synchro: 26–30 July
- Open Water: 26–30 July

== Medal table ==
* Host nation (Hungary)

Rank	Nation	Gold	Silver	Bronze	Total
1	Russia	16	7	3	26
2	Germany	12	10	5	27
3	France	6	3	9	18
4	Italy	5	6	11	22
5	Ukraine	5	4	5	14
6	Poland	5	2	1	8
7	Sweden	3	3	0	6
8	Great Britain	2	5	6	13
9	Netherlands	2	3	3	8
10	Hungary*	2	2	5	9
11	Finland	1	0	1	2
12	Spain	0	4	0	4
13	Greece	0	2	5	7
14	Austria	0	2	0	2
15	Croatia	0	1	1	2
16	Belarus	0	1	0	1
16	Norway	0	1	0	1
16	Slovakia	0	1	0	1
19	Czech Republic	0	0	2	2
20	Denmark	0	0	1	1
20	Romania	0	0	1	1
20	Slovenia	0	0	1	1
Totals (22 entries)		59	57	60	176

== Swimming ==
=== Schedule ===
Competition dates for Swimming were: 31 July – 6 August. All swimming events contested in a long-course (50 m) pool; with morning sessions (preliminary heats) beginning at 09:30, and evening sessions (semifinals and finals) beginning at 17:00. Event format was:

- 200 m and under: prelims/semifinals/finals—preliminary heats and semifinals were held on the same day (morning then evening), with finals of the event on the next evening.
- 400 m and longer: prelims/finals. In the 400 m, and the 4 × 100 m and 4 × 200 m relays, prelims and finals were held on the same day. In the women's 800 m and men's 1500 m events, prelims were held in the morning of day 1 of the event, with finals of the event in the evening session of day 2.

Event order for evening sessions was:

Date	Monday 31 July 2006	Tuesday 1 August 2006	Wednesday 2 August 2006	Thursday 3 August 2006
E v e n t s	400 free (m); 50 fly (w) – semis 100 back (m) – semis 400 IM (w); 100 breast (m) – semis 200 back (w) – semis 50 fly (m) – semis 4 × 100 Free Relay (w); 4 × 100 Free Relay (m)	50 fly (m); 100 free (w) – semis 100 back (m); 50 fly (w); 100 breast (m); 100 breast (w) – semis 200 IM (m) – semis 200 back (w); 200 free (m) – semis	800 free (w); 200 breast (m) – semis 200 IM (w) – semis 200 free (m); 100 breast (w); 200 fly (m) – semis 100 free (w); 200 IM (m); 100 back (w) – semis 50 back (m) – semis	200 IM (w); 100 free (m) – semis 100 fly (w) – semis 200 breast (m); 100 back (w); 200 fly (m); 200 breast (w) – semis 50 back (m); 4 × 200 Free Relay (w)
Date	Friday 4 August 2006	Saturday 5 August 2006	Sunday 6 August 2006	
E v e n t s	1500 free (m); 200 free (w) – semis 100 fly (m) – semis 200 breast (w); 100 free (m); 50 back (w) – semis 200 back (m) – semis 100 fly (w); 50 breast (m) – semis	50 breast (w) – semis 100 fly (m); 200 free (w); 50 free (m) – semis 50 back (w); 200 back (m); 200 fly (w) – semis 50 breast (m); 50 free (w) – semis 4 × 200 Free Relay (m)	50 free (w); 50 free (m); 50 breast (w); 200 fly (w); 400 IM (m); 400 free (w); 4 × 100 Medley Relay (w); 4 × 100 Medley Relay (m)	

=== Results ===
==== Men's Events ====
Event	Gold		Silver		Bronze	
50 m freestyle	Bartosz Kizierowski; Poland	21.88; CR	Oleksandr Volynets; Ukraine	21.97	Duje Draganja; Croatia	22.14
100 m freestyle	Filippo Magnini; Italy	48.79	Stefan Nystrand; Sweden	48.91	Pieter vd Hoogenband; Netherlands	48.94
200 m freestyle	Pieter vd Hoogenband; Netherlands	1:45.65	Massimiliano Rosolino; Italy	1:47.02	Filippo Magnini; Italy	1:47.57
400 m freestyle	Yury Prilukov; Russia	3:45.73; CR	Massimiliano Rosolino; Italy	3:46.87	Nicolas Rostoucher; France	3:47.04
1500 m freestyle	Yury Prilukov; Russia	14:51.93; CR	Sébastien Rouault; France	14:55.73	Nicolas Rostoucher; France	15:01.82
50 m backstroke	Helge Meeuw; Germany	25.06	Aristeidis Grigoriadis; Greece	25.14	Matthew Clay (United Kingdom) Great Britain	25.15
100 m backstroke	Arkady Vyatchanin; Russia	53.50; CR	Markus Rogan; Austria	54.07	Aristeidis Grigoriadis; Greece	54.34
200 m backstroke	Arkady Vyatchanin; Russia	1:55.44; ER, CR	László Cseh; Hungary	1:56.69	Răzvan Florea; Romania	1:57.83
50 m breaststroke	Oleg Lisogor; Ukraine; Alessandro Terrin; Italy	27.48	not awarded		Matjaž Markič; Slovenia	27.87
100 m breaststroke	Roman Sloudnov; Russia	1:00.61	Alexander Dale Oen; Norway	1:00.63	Oleg Lisogor; Ukraine	1:00.64
200 m breaststroke	Sławomir Kuczko; Poland	2:12.12	Paolo Bossini; Italy	2:12.35	Kristopher Gilchrist (United Kingdom) Great Britain	2:13.21
50 m butterfly	Sergiy Breus; Ukraine	23.41; CR	Duje Draganja; Croatia	23.62	Jakob Andkjær; Denmark; Andriy Serdinov; Ukraine	23.77
100 m butterfly	Andriy Serdinov; Ukraine	51.95	Amaury Leveaux; France	52.76	Nikolay Skvortsov; Russia	52.96
200 m butterfly	Paweł Korzeniowski; Poland	1:55.04; CR	Ioannis Drymonakos; Greece	1:57.03	Nikolay Skvortsov; Russia	1:57.12
200 m individual medley	László Cseh; Hungary	1:58.17; CR	Alessio Boggiatto; Italy	2:00.14	Tamás Kerékjártó; Hungary	2:00.17
400 m individual medley	László Cseh; Hungary	4:09.86; CR	Luca Marin; Italy	4:14.15	Alessio Boggiatto; Italy	4:16.34
4 × 100 m freestyle relay	Alessandro Calvi; Christian Galenda; Lorenzo Vismara; Filippo Magnini; Italy	3:15.23; CR	Evgeny Lagunov; Andrey Grechin; Ivan Usov; Andrey Kapralov; Russia	3:16.47	Alain Bernard; Grégory Mallet; Fabien Gilot; Amaury Leveaux; France	3:16.53
4 × 200 m freestyle relay	Massimiliano Rosolino; David Berbotto; Nicola Cassio; Filippo Magnini; Italy	7:09.60; CR	David Carry; Simon Burnett; Andrew Hunter; Ross Davenport (United Kingdom) Great Britain	7:11.63	Andreas Zisimos; Georgios Demetis; Dimitrios Manganas; Nikolaos Xylouris; Greece	7:16.67
4 × 100 m medley relay	Arkady Vyatchanin; Roman Sloudnov; Nikolay Skvortsov; Andrey Kapralov; Russia	3:34.96; CR	Andriy Oleynyk; Oleg Lisogor; Andriy Serdinov; Yuriy Yegoshin; Ukraine	3:36.21	Liam Tancock; James Gibson; Todd Cooper; Simon Burnett (United Kingdom) Great Britain	3:36.61

==== Women's Events ====
Event	Gold		Silver		Bronze	
50 m freestyle	Britta Steffen; Germany	24.72	Therese Alshammar; Sweden	24.87	Marleen Veldhuis; Netherlands	24.89
100 m freestyle	Britta Steffen; Germany	53.30; WR	Marleen Veldhuis; Netherlands	54.32	Nery-Madey Niangkoura; Greece	54.48
200 m freestyle	Otylia Jędrzejczak; Poland	1:57.25	Annika Liebs; Germany	1:57.48	Laure Manaudou; France	1:58.48
400 m freestyle	Laure Manaudou; France	4:02.13; WR	Joanne Jackson (United Kingdom) Great Britain	4:07.76	Caitlin McClatchey (United Kingdom) Great Britain	4:08.13
800 m freestyle	Laure Manaudou; France	8:19.29; ER	Rebecca Adlington (United Kingdom) Great Britain	8:27.88	Rebecca Cooke (United Kingdom) Great Britain	8:28.40
50 m backstroke	Janine Pietsch; Germany	28.36; CR	Aleksandra Gerasimenya; Belarus	28.72	Antje Buschschulte; Germany	28.73
100 m backstroke	Laure Manaudou; France	1:00.88	Antje Buschschulte; Germany	1:01.40	Janine Pietsch; Germany	1:01.55
200 m backstroke	Esther Baron; France	2:10.07	Iryna Amshennikova; Ukraine	2:12.13	Melanie Marshall (United Kingdom) Great Britain	2:12.17
50 m breaststroke	Elena Bogomazova; Russia	31.69	Kate Haywood (United Kingdom) Great Britain	31.71	Ágnes Kovács; Hungary	31.95
100 m breaststroke	Ganna Khlystunova; Ukraine	1:07.55; CR	Kirsty Balfour (United Kingdom) Great Britain	1:07.95	Ágnes Kovács; Hungary	1:08.60
200 m breaststroke	Kirsty Balfour (United Kingdom) Great Britain	2:25.66	Yuliya Pidlisna; Ukraine	2:28.42	Ágnes Kovács; Hungary	2:28.90
50 m butterfly	Therese Alshammar; Sweden	26.06	Anna-Karin Kammerling; Sweden	26.23	Chantal Groot; Netherlands	26.49
100 m butterfly	Inge Dekker; Netherlands	58.35	Martina Moravcová; Slovakia	58.98	Alena Popchanka; France	59.06
200 m butterfly	Otylia Jędrzejczak; Poland	2:07.09	Francesca Segat; Italy	2:08.96	Caterina Giacchetti; Italy	2:09.01
200 m individual medley	Laure Manaudou; France	2:12.69	Katarzyna Baranowska; Poland	2:13.36	Alessia Filippi; Italy	2:13.75
400 m individual medley	Alessia Filippi; Italy	4:35.80	Nicole Hetzer; Germany	4:37.97	Katarzyna Baranowska; Poland	4:40.02
4 × 100 m freestyle relay	Petra Dallmann; Daniela Götz; Britta Steffen; Annika Liebs; Germany	3:35.22; WR	Inge Dekker; Ranomi Kromowidjojo; Chantal Groot; Marleen Veldhuis; Netherlands	3:37.04	Alena Popchanka; Aurore Mongel; Céline Couderc; Malia Metella; France	3:38.83
4 × 200 m freestyle relay	Petra Dallmann; Daniela Samulski; Britta Steffen; Annika Liebs; Germany	7:50.82; WR	Otylia Jędrzejczak; Joanna Budzis; Agata Zwiejska; Paulina Barzycka; Poland	7:56.32	Alena Popchanka; Sophie Huber; Aurore Mongel; Laure Manaudou; France	7:56.44
4 × 100 m medley relay	Melanie Marshall; Kirsty Balfour; Terri Dunning; Francesca Halsall (United Kingdom) Great Britain	4:02.24	Antje Buschschulte; Sarah Poewe; Annika Mehlhorn; Britta Steffen; Germany	4:02.35	Laure Manaudou; Anne-Sophie Le Paranthoën; Alena Popchanka; Céline Couderc; France	4:03.64

WR= World Record (and by default also new European, Championships and National records for those involved); ER= European Record (and by default also new Championships and National records); CR= Championships Record

==== Medal table ====
Rank	Nation	Gold	Silver	Bronze	Total
1	Russia	7	1	2	10
2	Germany	6	4	2	12
3	Italy	5	6	4	15
4	France	5	2	8	15
5	Poland	5	2	1	8
6	Ukraine	4	4	2	10
7	Great Britain	2	5	6	13
8	Netherlands	2	2	3	7
9	Hungary	2	1	4	7
10	Sweden	1	3	0	4
11	Greece	0	2	3	5
12	Croatia	0	1	1	2
13	Austria	0	1	0	1
13	Belarus	0	1	0	1
13	Norway	0	1	0	1
13	Slovakia	0	1	0	1
17	Denmark	0	0	1	1
17	Romania	0	0	1	1
17	Slovenia	0	0	1	1
Totals (19 entries)		39	37	39	115

== Diving ==
=== Schedule ===
Competition dates for Diving were: 1–6 August 2006.

=== Results ===
==== Men ====
Event	Gold		Silver		Bronze	
1 m springboard	Joona Puhakka; Finland	425.00	Alexander Dobroskok; Russia	416.60	Christopher Sacchin; Italy	415.70
3 m springboard	Dmitri Sautin; Russia	496.10	Alexander Dobroskok; Russia	479.95	Joona Puhakka; Finland	464.60
10 m platform	Gleb Galperin; Russia	472.90	Heiko Meyer; Germany	459.45	Konstyantyn Milyayev; Ukraine	436.50
3 m springboard synchro	Tobias Schellenberg; Andreas Wels; Germany	403.86	Yury Kunakov; Dmitri Sautin; Russia	401.46	Nicola Marconi; Tommaso Marconi; Italy	394.68
10 m platform synchro	Dmitry Dobroskok; Gleb Galperin; Russia	469.38	Sascha Klein; Heiko Meyer; Germany	447.96	Michele Benedetti; Francesco Dell'Uomo; Italy	435.12

==== Women ====
Event	Gold		Silver		Bronze	
1 m springboard	Anna Lindberg; Sweden	291.90	Ditte Kotzian; Germany	279.30	Maria Marconi; Italy	267.35
3 m springboard	Anna Lindberg; Sweden	330.60	Ditte Kotzian; Germany	324.90	Nóra Barta; Hungary	319.85
10 m platform	Yulia Prokopchuk; Ukraine	338.00	Anja Richter; Austria	332.35	Christin Steuer; Germany	330.40
3 m springboard synchro	Nataliya Umyskova; Nadezhda Bazhina; Russia	314.55	Heike Fischer; Ditte Kotzian; Germany	298.60	Olena Fedorova; Kristina Ishchenko; Ukraine	292.17
10 m platform synchro	Annett Gamm; Nora Subschinski; Germany	325.92	Natalia Goncharova; Yulia Koltunova; Russia	306.24	Yulia Prokopchuk; Kateryna Zhuk; Ukraine	297.21

==== Medal table ====
Rank	Nation	Gold	Silver	Bronze	Total
1	Russia	4	4	0	8
2	Germany	2	5	1	8
3	Sweden	2	0	0	2
4	Ukraine	1	0	3	4
5	Finland	1	0	1	2
6	Austria	0	1	0	1
7	Italy	0	0	4	4
8	Hungary	0	0	1	1
Totals (8 entries)		10	10	10	30

== Synchronized Swimming ==
=== Schedule ===
Competition dates for Synchro were 26–30 July 2006.

=== Results ===
Event	Gold		Silver		Bronze	
Solo free routine	Natalia Ishchenko; Russia	98.4	Gemma Mengual; Spain	97.7	Nathalia Anthopolou; Greece	93.9
Duet free routine	Anastasia Davydova; Anastassia Ermakova; Russia	98.8	Gemma Mengual; Paola Tirados; Spain	97.5	Eleftheria Ftouli; Evanthia Makrygianni; Greece	94.0
Team free routine	Russia: Mariya Gromova; Natalia Ishchenko; Elvira Khassianova; Olga Kuzhela; Anna Nasekina; Elena Ovtchinnikova; Svetlana Romashina; Anna Shorina	98.8	Spain: Alba Cabello; Raquel Corral; Andrea Fuentes; Tina Fuentes; Laura López; Gisela Morón; Irina Rodríguez; Paola Tirados	97.3	Italy: Alessia Bigi; Elisa Bozzo; Manila Flamini; Francesca Gangemi; Mariangela Perrupato; Benedetta Re; Sara Sgarzi; Federica Tommasi	93.6
Free routine combination	Russia: Anastasia Davydova; Anastassia Ermakova; Mariya Gromova; Natalia Ishchenko; Elvira Khassianova; Olga Kuzhela; Anna Nasekina; Elena Ovtchinnikova; Svetlana Romashina; Anna Shorina	97.9	Spain: Alba Cabello; Raquel Corral; Andrea Fuentes; Tina Fuentes; Thais Henríquez; Laura López; Gemma Mengual; Gisela Morón; Irina Rodríguez; Paola Tirados	95.9	Italy: Alessia Bigi; Elisa Bozzo; Manila Flamini; Francesca Gangemi; Mariangela Perrupato; Benedetta Re; Dalila Schiesaro; Sara Sgarzi; Virna Taccone; Federica Tommasi	93.5

==== Medal table ====
Rank	Nation	Gold	Silver	Bronze	Total
1	Russia	4	0	0	4
2	Spain	0	4	0	4
3	Greece	0	0	2	2
3	Italy	0	0	2	2
Totals (4 entries)		4	4	4	12

== Open Water Swimming ==
=== Schedule ===
Competition dates for Open Water were 26–30 July 2006.

=== Results ===
==== Men ====
Event	Gold		Silver		Bronze	
5 km	Thomas Lurz; Germany	56:00.1	Christian Hein; Germany	56:01.1	Simone Ercoli; Italy	56:01.8
10 km	Thomas Lurz; Germany	1:58:12.1	Maarten van der Weijden; Netherlands	1:58:13.5	Christian Hein; Germany	1:58:16.6
25 km	Gilles Rondy; France	5:10:17.3	Anton Sanachev; Russia	5:10:18.2	Stéphane Gomez; France	5:10:19.3

==== Women ====
Event	Gold		Silver		Bronze	
5 km	Ekaterina Seliverstova; Russia	1:01:50.8	Cathi Dietrich; France	1:01:52.3	Jana Pechanová; Czech Republic; Larisa Ilchenko; Russia	1:01:52.4
10 km	Angela Maurer; Germany	2:07:10.8	Rita Kovács; Hungary	2:07:14.3	Jana Pechanová; Czech Republic	2:07:15.6
25 km	Angela Maurer; Germany	5:35:19.1	Natalia Pankina; Russia	5:35:25.1	Stefanie Biller; Germany	5:35:29.5

==== Medal table ====
Rank	Nation	Gold	Silver	Bronze	Total
1	Germany	4	1	2	7
2	Russia	1	2	1	4
3	France	1	1	1	3
4	Hungary	0	1	0	1
4	Netherlands	0	1	0	1
6	Czech Republic	0	0	2	2
7	Italy	0	0	1	1
Totals (7 entries)		6	6	7	19

== See also ==
- Ligue Européenne de Natation – LEN: the European Swimming League

== Sources ==
- Official Budapest 2006 Website
- Swim Rankings Results
