= 2006 FINA Synchronised Swimming World Trophy =

International swimming competition

The 1st FINA Synchronised Swimming World Trophy was held 2006 in Moscow, Russia. It featured swimmers from 8 nations, swimming in three events: Duet, Team and Free Combination.

== Participating nations ==
8 nations swam at the 2006 Synchro World Trophy:

- Brazil
- Canada
- Egypt
- Italy
- Japan
- Russia
- Spain
- USA

== Results ==
Event	Gold		Silver		Bronze	
Duet details	Anastasia Davydova; Anastasia Ermakova; Russia	99.333	Gemma Mengual; Paola Tirados; Spain	98.000	Saho Harada; Ayako Matsumura; Japan	97.000
Team details	Russia	99.333	Spain	97.667	Japan	97.000
Free combination details	(United States) USA	97.667	Russia	97.333	Spain	96.667

== Final standings ==
Place	Nation	Total
1	Russia	295.999
2	Spain	292.334
3	Japan	290.334
