= Synchronized swimming at the 2008 Summer Olympics – Women's duet =

Women's duet at the Games of the XXIX Olympiad
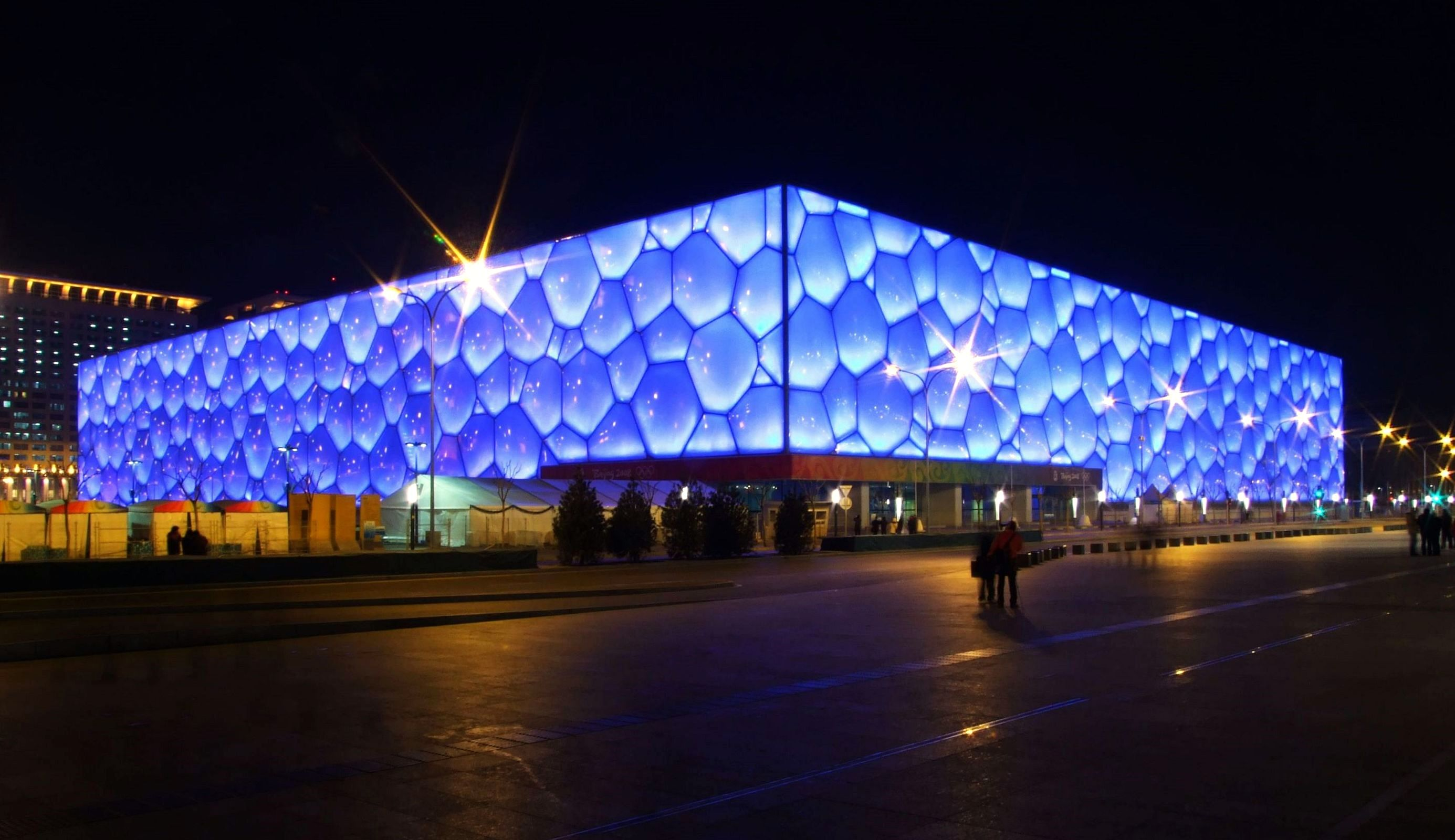
- Aquatics Center in Beijing
- Venue: Beijing National Aquatics Center
- Date: 18–20 August 2008
- Competitors: 48 from 24 nations
- Winning points: 99.251

Medalists
1st place, gold medalist(s)		Anastasia Davydova; Anastasia Ermakova	Russia
2nd place, silver medalist(s)		Andrea Fuentes; Gemma Mengual	Spain
3rd place, bronze medalist(s)		Saho Harada; Emiko Suzuki	Japan

The women's duet synchronized swimming event at the 2008 Summer Olympics was held from August 18 to 20, at the Beijing National Aquatics Center.

A total of 24 duets, each composed of two swimmers, competed in the event, which consisted of two rounds. The preliminary round included both a technical routine and a free routine. Finalists then performed a second free routine, with their score combined with the preliminary technical routine score to determine the final standings.

The technical routine required the execution of ten prescribed elements in a specific order, within a time limit of 2 minutes and 5 seconds to 2 minutes and 35 seconds. The free routine, by contrast, allowed greater flexibility in content but had to be performed within a duration of 3 minutes and 15 seconds to 3 minutes and 45 seconds.

Each routine was evaluated by two panels of five judges: one for technical merit and another for artistic impression. Judges awarded scores ranging from 0 to 10. For each panel, the highest and lowest scores were discarded, and the remaining scores were summed to produce the routine’s total. The combined scores of the routines determined the final result for each duet.

== Results ==
=== Preliminary ===
Rank	Country	Athlete	Technical	Free	Total
1	Russia	Anastasia Davydova & Anastasiya Yermakova	49.334	49.500	98.834
2	Spain	Andrea Fuentes & Gemma Mengual	48.834	49.084	97.918
3	Japan	Saho Harada & Emiko Suzuki	48.250	48.400	96.750
4	China	Jiang Tingting & Jiang Wenwen	48.084	48.500	96.584
5	United States	Christina Jones & Andrea Nott	47.750	47.750	95.500
6	Canada	Marie-Pier Boudreau Gagnon & Isabelle Rampling	47.417	47.333	94.750
7	Italy	Beatrice Adelizzi & Giulia Lapi	46.834	47.000	93.834
8	Ukraine	Daria Iushko & Kseniya Sydorenko	46.084	46.334	92.418
9	Netherlands	Bianca van der Velden & Sonja van der Velden	45.584	45.834	91.418
9	Greece	Evanthia Makrygianni & Despoina Solomou	45.834	45.584	91.418
11	France	Apolline Dreyfuss & Lila Meesseman-Bakir	44.750	45.250	90.000
12	Switzerland	Magdalena Brunner & Ariane Schneider	44.250	45.000	89.250
13	Brazil	Nayara Figueira & Lara Teixeira	44.334	44.667	89.001
14	Great Britain	Olivia Allison & Jenna Randall	43.917	44.667	88.584
15	Israel	Anastasia Gloushkov & Inna Yoffe	43.583	43.334	86.917
16	North Korea	Kim Yong-Mi & Wang Ok-Gyong	42.917	43.584	86.501
17	Belarus	Katsiaryna Kulpo & Nastassia Parfenava	42.667	42.667	85.334
18	Czech Republic	Soňa Bernardová & Alžběta Dufková	42.500	42.750	85.250
19	Mexico	Mariana Cifuentes & Isabel Delgado	42.334	42.834	85.168
20	Kazakhstan	Ainur Kerey & Arna Toktagan	41.750	42.583	84.333
21	Australia	Myriam Glez & Erika Leal-Ramirez	41.250	41.584	82.834
22	Austria	Nadine Brandl & Elisabeth Mahn	41.250	41.167	82.417
23	New Zealand	Lisa Daniels & Nina Daniels	40.750	40.417	81.167
24	Egypt	Reem Abdalazem & Dalia El Gebaly	40.417	40.250	80.667

=== Final ===
Rank	Country	Athlete	Technical	Free	Total
1st place, gold medalist(s)	Russia	Anastasia Davydova & Anastasiya Yermakova	49.334	49.917	99.251
2nd place, silver medalist(s)	Spain	Andrea Fuentes & Gemma Mengual	48.834	49.500	98.334
3rd place, bronze medalist(s)	Japan	Saho Harada & Emiko Suzuki	48.250	48.917	97.167
4	China	Jiang Tingting & Jiang Wenwen	48.084	48.250	96.334
5	United States	Christina Jones & Andrea Nott	47.750	47.750	95.500
6	Canada	Marie-Pier Boudreau Gagnon & Isabelle Rampling	47.417	47.667	95.084
7	Italy	Beatrice Adelizzi & Giulia Lapi	46.834	46.917	93.751
8	Ukraine	Daria Iushko & Kseniya Sydorenko	46.084	46.584	92.668
9	Netherlands	Bianca van der Velden & Sonja van der Velden	45.584	46.083	91.667
10	Greece	Evanthia Makrygianni & Despoina Solomou	45.834	45.667	91.501
11	France	Apolline Dreyfuss & Lila Meesseman-Bakir	44.750	45.583	90.333
12	Switzerland	Magdalena Brunner & Ariane Schneider	44.250	45.000	89.250
