= Gisela Morón =

Spanish synchronized swimmer

Personal information
- Born: 25 January 1976 (age 50) Barcelona, Spain

Sport
- Sport: Synchronised swimming
Medal record
Representing Spain
Olympic Games
Silver medal – second place	2008 Beijing	Team competition
World Championships
Gold medal – first place	2009 Rome	Free routine combination
Silver medal – second place	2003 Barcelona	Free combination
Silver medal – second place	2007 Melbourne	Team free
Bronze medal – third place	2005 Montreal	Team
Bronze medal – third place	2005 Montreal	Free combination
Bronze medal – third place	2007 Melbourne	Team technical
European Championships
Gold medal – first place	2004 Madrid	Team, free routine
Gold medal – first place	2008 Eindhoven	Team, free routine
Silver medal – second place	2004 Madrid	Team, free
Silver medal – second place	2006 Budapest	Team, free
Silver medal – second place	2006 Budapest	Team, free routine

Gisela Morón Rovira (Note: In this Spanish name, the first or paternal surname is Morón and the second or maternal family name is Rovira.) (born 25 January 1976 in Barcelona) is a Spanish synchronized swimmer. She competed at the 2008 Summer Olympics.
