= Elena Ovchinnikova =

Elena Ovchinnikova may refer to:

- Elena Chebukina (Ovchinnikova), Russian volleyball player
- Yelena Ovchinnikova, Russian synchronized swimmer
