= Dominika Kopcik =

Canadian synchronized swimmer

Personal information
- Born: October 27, 1988 (age 37) Toronto, Canada

Sport
- Sport: Synchronised swimming
Medal record
Representing Canada
Pan American Games
Silver medal – second place	2007 Rio de Janeiro	Team

Dominika Kopcik (born 27 October 1988) is a Canadian synchronized swimmer. She began synchronized swimming at the age of 10. At 14, she became a national champion, earning her a spot to compete in the 2003 Canada Games, where she won in three categories. By the next spring season, Kopcik had won the national championships again and made her first Canadian National team. Kopcik then competed at the 2004 FINA World Junior Swimming Championships.

At the age of 15, Kopcik became Canada's youngest ever member of the National Olympic Team. She secured her place by becoming flyer of the team alongside her duet partner. Over the next 4 years, Kopcik competed at the 2005 FINA World Championships, 2006 FINA Synchronised Swimming World Cup, 2007 Pan American Games, and the 2008 Olympic Games.

== Career Achievements ==
2002 Canada National Champion
1st Place Solo Competition
1st Place Duet Competition
1st Place Combination Team

2003 Canada Summer Games
1st Place Solo Competition
1st Place Duet Competition
1st Place Combination Team

2004 Canada National Champion
1st Place Solo Competition
1st Place Duet Competition
1st Place Combination Team

2004 FINA Junior World Championships
4th Place Team Free and Technical

2005 FINA World Championships
4th Place Team Free and Technical
4th Place Combination Team

2007 Pan American Games
2nd Place Team Free and Technical

2007 Japan Open
4th Place Duet Free and Technical
4th Place Team Free and Technical

2008 Olympic Games
4th Place Team Free and Technical

== Post-competition ==
After retiring from competitive synchronized swimming in 2008, Dominika Kopcik and her husband Jonathan Difino, opened catering company Cafe Lunchboxx in Montreal, in May 2009.

Kopcik currently works as Territory Manager for Xcite Technologies, and speaks at various public events.
