= Petra Dallmann =

German swimmer (born 1978)

Personal information
- Born: November 21, 1978 (age 47) Freiburg im Breisgau, West Germany

Sport
- Sport: Swimming
Medal record
Representing Germany
Olympic Games
Bronze medal – third place	2004 Athens	4x200 m freestyle
World Championships (LC)
Gold medal – first place	2001 Fukuoka	4×100 m freestyle
Silver medal – second place	2003 Barcelona	4×100 m freestyle
Silver medal – second place	2005 Montreal	4×100 m freestyle
Silver medal – second place	2007 Melbourne	4×200 m freestyle
Silver medal – second place	2009 Rome	4×100 m freestyle
European Championships (LC)
Gold medal – first place	2002 Berlin	4×100 m freestyle
Gold medal – first place	2002 Berlin	4×200 m freestyle
Gold medal – first place	2006 Budapest	4×100 m freestyle
Gold medal – first place	2006 Budapest	4×200 m freestyle
European Championships (SC)
Bronze medal – third place	2002 Riesa	100 m freestyle
Bronze medal – third place	2004 Vienna	200 m freestyle
Bronze medal – third place	2005 Trieste	100 m freestyle
Summer Universiade
Gold medal – first place	2001 Beijing	100m freestyle
Gold medal – first place	2003 Daegu	100m freestyle
Bronze medal – third place	2003 Daegu	50m freestyle

Petra Dallmann (born 21 November 1978) is a German swimmer. She won a bronze medal in 2004 Olympics. She has also won many other medals, including a gold medal in 2001 World Aquatics Championships.

== See also ==
- List of World Aquatics Championships medalists in swimming (women)#4 .C3.97 100 metre freestyle
