= Olha Leonova =

Ukrainian diver (born 1976)

Personal information
- Nationality: Ukrainian
- Born: 27 June 1976 (age 50)

Sport
- Sport: Diving
Medal record
Women's diving
Representing Ukraine
European Championships
Silver medal – second place	2002 Berlin	10 m synchro
Bronze medal – third place	2000 Helsinki	10 m synchro
Bronze medal – third place	2002 Berlin	10 m platform
Summer Universiade
Silver medal – second place	2001 Beijing	Team

Olha Leonova (born 27 June 1976) is a Ukrainian diver. She competed in the women's 10 metre platform event at the 2004 Summer Olympics.
