= András Hajnal (diver) =

Hungarian diver (born 1982)

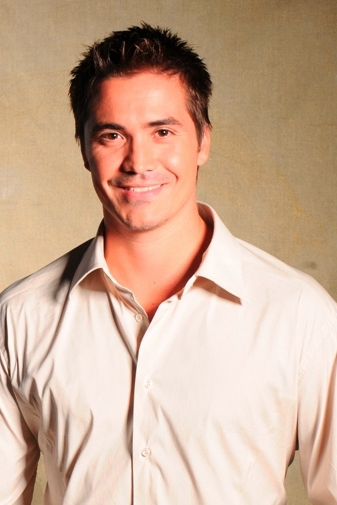
- András Hajnal in 2013

Personal information
- Nationality: Hungarian
- Born: 21 February 1982 (age 44) Budapest, Hungary

Sport
- Sport: Diving
Medal record
Men's diving
Representing Hungary
European Championships
Silver medal – second place	2002 Berlin	10 m synchro

András Hajnal (born 21 February 1982) is a Hungarian diver. He competed at the 2000 Summer Olympics and the 2004 Summer Olympics.
