= Irina Rodríguez =

Spanish synchronized swimmer

Personal information
- Born: 16 September 1977 (age 49) Barcelona, Spain

Sport
- Sport: Synchronised swimming
Medal record
Representing Spain
Olympic Games
Silver medal – second place	2008 Beijing	Team Competition
World Championships
Gold medal – first place	2009 Rome	Free Routine Combination
Silver medal – second place	2003 Barcelona	Free combination
Silver medal – second place	2007 Melbourne	Team free
Silver medal – second place	2009 Rome	Team Technical Routine
Silver medal – second place	2009 Rome	Team Free Routine
Bronze medal – third place	2005 Montreal	Team
Bronze medal – third place	2007 Melbourne	Team technical
Bronze medal – third place	2005 Montreal	Free combination
European Championships
Gold medal – first place	2004 Madrid	Combination free
Gold medal – first place	2008 Eindhoven	Combination free
Gold medal – first place	2008 Eindhoven	Team
Silver medal – second place	2006 Budapest	Free combination
Silver medal – second place	2006 Budapest	Team
Silver medal – second place	2010 Budapest	Combination

Irina Rodríguez Álvarez (Note: In this Spanish name, the first or paternal surname is Rodríguez and the second or maternal family name is Álvarez.) (born 16 September 1977 in Barcelona) is a Spanish synchronized swimmer who competed at the 2008 Summer Olympics.
