= Svetlana Romashina =

Russian synchronized swimmer

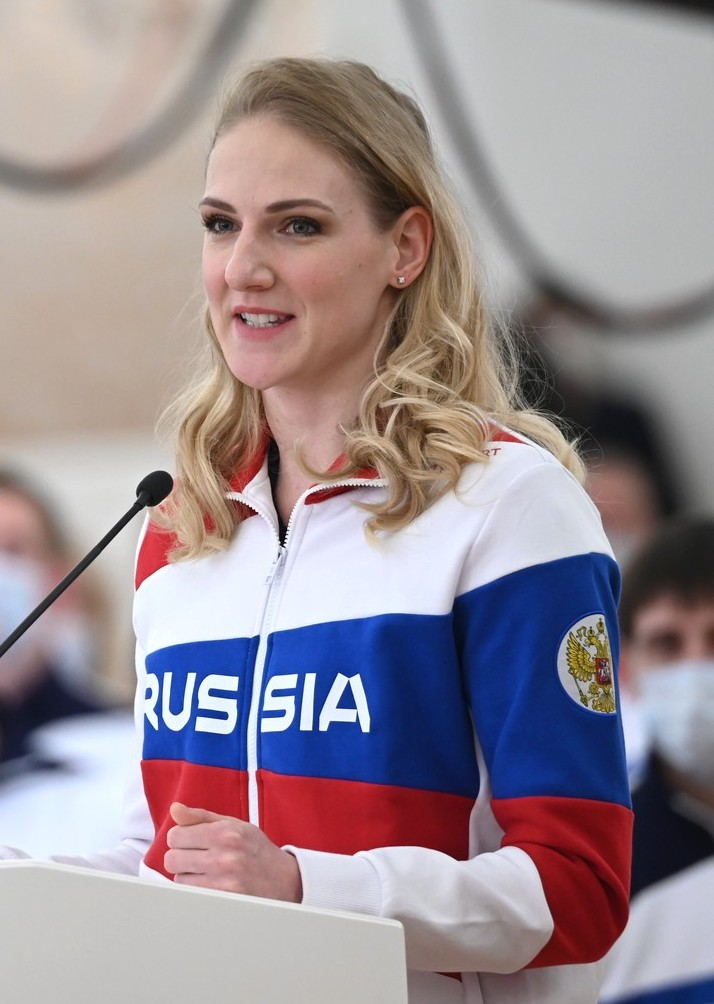
- Romashina in June 2021

Personal information
- Full name: Svetlana Alekseyevna Romashina
- Nationality: (Russia) Russian
- Born: 21 September 1989 (age 36) Moscow, Russian SFSR, Soviet Union
- Height: 1.73 m (5 ft 8 in)
- Weight: 55 kg (121 lb)

Sport
- Sport: Swimming
- Strokes: Synchronised swimming
- Club: Dynamo Moscow
- Coach: Tatiana Danchenko (Duet); Tatyana Pokrovskaya (Team)
Medal record
Event	1st	2nd	3rd
Olympic Games	7	0	0
World Championships	21	0	0
European Championships	13	0	0
Summer Universiade	2	0	0
Total	43	0	0
Representing (Russia) ROC
Olympic Games
Gold medal – first place	2020 Tokyo	Duet
Gold medal – first place	2020 Tokyo	Team
Representing Russia
Olympic Games
Gold medal – first place	2008 Beijing	Team
Gold medal – first place	2012 London	Duet
Gold medal – first place	2012 London	Team
Gold medal – first place	2016 Rio de Janeiro	Duet
Gold medal – first place	2016 Rio de Janeiro	Team
World Championships
Gold medal – first place	2005 Montreal	Team
Gold medal – first place	2005 Montreal	Free routine combination
Gold medal – first place	2007 Melbourne	Team technical routine
Gold medal – first place	2007 Melbourne	Team free routine
Gold medal – first place	2007 Melbourne	Free routine combination
Gold medal – first place	2009 Rome	Duet technical routine
Gold medal – first place	2009 Rome	Duet free routine
Gold medal – first place	2009 Rome	Team free routine
Gold medal – first place	2011 Shanghai	Duet technical routine
Gold medal – first place	2011 Shanghai	Duet free routine
Gold medal – first place	2011 Shanghai	Free routine combination
Gold medal – first place	2013 Barcelona	Solo free routine
Gold medal – first place	2013 Barcelona	Solo technical routine
Gold medal – first place	2013 Barcelona	Duet free routine
Gold medal – first place	2013 Barcelona	Duet technical routine
Gold medal – first place	2015 Kazan	Solo technical routine
Gold medal – first place	2015 Kazan	Duet technical routine
Gold medal – first place	2015 Kazan	Duet free routine
Gold medal – first place	2019 Gwangju	Solo free routine
Gold medal – first place	2019 Gwangju	Duet technical routine
Gold medal – first place	2019 Gwangju	Duet free routine
European Championships
Gold medal – first place	2006 Budapest	Team
Gold medal – first place	2006 Budapest	Free routine combination
Gold medal – first place	2010 Budapest	Team
Gold medal – first place	2010 Budapest	Duet
Gold medal – first place	2010 Budapest	Free routine combination
Gold medal – first place	2012 Eindhoven	Duet
Gold medal – first place	2014 Berlin	Solo
Gold medal – first place	2016 London	Solo technical routine
Gold medal – first place	2016 London	Duet free routine
Gold medal – first place	2016 London	Duet technical routine
Gold medal – first place	2020 Budapest	Duet free routine
Gold medal – first place	2020 Budapest	Duet technical routine
Gold medal – first place	2020 Budapest	Team technical routine
Summer Universiade
Gold medal – first place	2013 Kazan	Solo
Gold medal – first place	2013 Kazan	Duet

Svetlana Alekseyevna Romashina (Russian: Светлана Алексеевна Ромашина, IPA: [svʲɪˈtɫanə rɐˈmaʂɨnə]; born September 21, 1989) is a former Russian synchronized swimmer. She won a total of 41 gold medals while competing in four Olympic Games, seven world championships, and six European championships. After winning two golds at the 2020 Summer Olympics, she became the most decorated athlete in the history of her sport.

After leading the Russian Olympic Committee squad to victory at the Tokyo Games, Romashina announced the end of her Olympic career.

== Career ==
=== Early career ===
Born in Moscow, Romashina began training in artistic swimming at age six. At fifteen years old, she won two gold medals in team competition and combo routine at the 2005 World Aquatics Championships.

=== World Championships ===
After the 2019 World Aquatics Championships in Gwangju, South Korea, Romashina became the most awarded athlete in the history of synchronized swimming with 21 gold medals. She surpassed her compatriot, Natalia Ishchenko, who holds 19 gold medals from the World Championships.

=== Olympic Games ===
Romashina won four consecutive Olympic gold medals in the team competition at the 2008, 2012, 2016, and 2020 Summer Olympics. She also won the duet event at London and Rio de Janeiro with Natalia Ishchenko. At the 2020 Summer Olympics, held in Tokyo in 2021, Romashina partnered with Svetlana Kolesnichenko and won the duet event.

== Retirement ==
Romashina announced her retirement from artistic swimming in 2023.

=== Personal life ===
In 2017, Romashina gave birth to her daughter Alexandra.

== See also ==
- List of multiple Olympic gold medalists
