= Janet Culp =

American synchronized swimmer

Personal information
- Nationality: United States
- Born: February 24, 1982 (age 44) Denver, Colorado, US
- Height: 1.60 m (5 ft 3 in)
- Weight: 49 kg (108 lb)

Sport
- Sport: Swimming
- Strokes: Synchronized swimming
- Club: Santa Clara Aquamaids
- Updated on 7 June 2015

Janet Culp (born February 24, 1982) is an American synchronized swimmer who competed in the women's team event at the 2008 Summer Olympics.

She graduated from Santa Clara University in 2004.
