= Elvira Khasyanova =

Russian synchronized swimmer

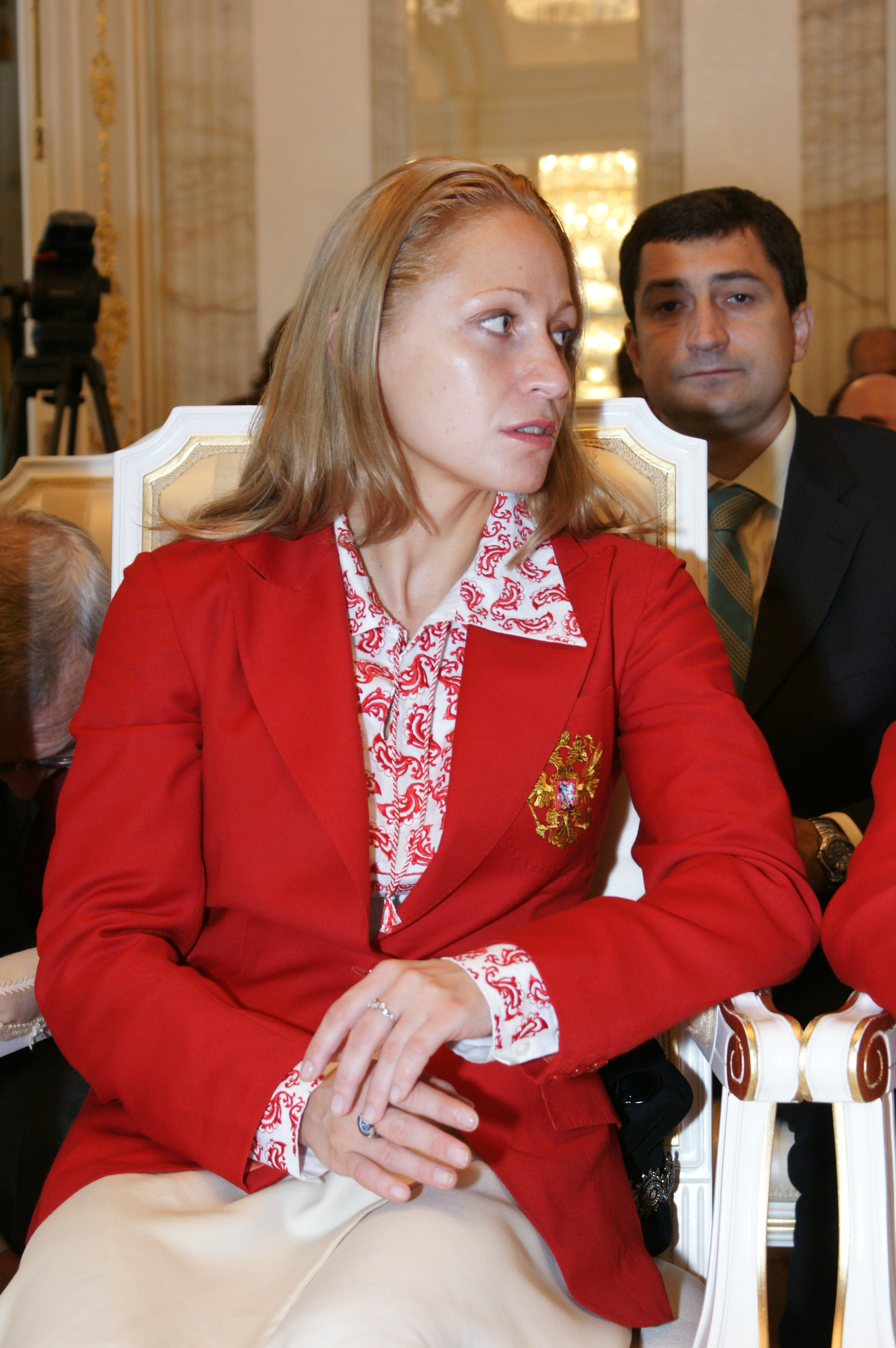
- Elvira Khasyanova in 2008

Personal information
- Full name: Elvira Ramilevna Khasyanova
- Nationality: Russia
- Born: 28 March 1981 (age 45) Moscow, Russian SFSR, Soviet Union
- Height: 1.63 m (5 ft 4 in)
- Weight: 57 kg (126 lb)

Sport
- Sport: Swimming
- Strokes: Synchronized swimming
- Club: Dynamo Moscow
Medal record
Women's synchronized swimming
Representing Russia
Event	1st	2nd	3rd
Olympic Games	3	0	0
World Championships	9	2	0
European Championships (SC)	5	0	0
Total	17	0	0
Olympic Games
Gold medal – first place	2004 Athens	Team
Gold medal – first place	2008 Beijing	Team
Gold medal – first place	2012 London	Team
World Championships
Gold medal – first place	2001 Fukuoka	Team
Gold medal – first place	2003 Barcelona	Team
Gold medal – first place	2005 Montreal	Team
Gold medal – first place	2007 Melbourne	Free routine combination
Gold medal – first place	2007 Melbourne	Team technical routine
Gold medal – first place	2007 Melbourne	Team free routine
Gold medal – first place	2011 Shanghai	Team technical routine
Gold medal – first place	2011 Shanghai	Free routine combination
Gold medal – first place	2011 Shanghai	Team free routine
European Championships
Gold medal – first place	2002 Berlin	Team
Gold medal – first place	2004 Madrid	Team
Gold medal – first place	2006 Budapest	Team
Gold medal – first place	2010 Budapest	Team
Gold medal – first place	2010 Budapest	Combination
- Updated on 22 May 2015

Elvira Ramilevna Khasyanova (Russian: Эльвира Рамилевна Хасянова: born 28 March 1981, Moscow, USSR) is a highly decorated former synchronised swimmer from Russia, coach, and sports administrator. She is a three-time Olympic gold medalist (2004, 2008, 2012) with the Russian national team. Elvira Khasyanova also won five World Championship titles (2001, 2003, 2005, 2007, 2011) and four European Championship titles (2002, 2004, 2006, 2010). Following her retirement in 2012, Elvira has also built a successful coaching career, including roles as Assistant Coach for the USA Artistic Swimming Senior National Team (2015–2018) and, since 2018, for Stanford University where she has helped guide the team to national and conference championships. Elvira was inducted into the International Swimming Hall of Fame Class of 2021 for her athletic achievements.

Khasyanova first began competing in synchronized swimming at Club Trud in Moscow in 1988. Elvira competed as a member of the Russian Junior National Team from 1994 through 1998. In 1996, she won gold in the team events at the Junior World Championships and at the Junior European Championships. She repeated her gold winning performances in the duet and team events at the 1998 Junior World and the Junior European Championships. In 1999, Khasyanova’s dreams began to take shape as she became a member of the Russian Senior National Team.

As a member of the Russian Senior National Team from 1999 to 2012, Elvira was a member of the Russian teams that won gold medals in the team competition in 2004, 2008 and 2012 Olympics. She also won World Championships in 2001, 2003, 2005, 2007 and 2011 along with European Championships in 2002, 2004, 2006 and 2010. After the 2012 Olympics, Elvira was only one of five synchronized swimmers presented with the prestigious Order for Services to the Fatherland Award.

Khasyanova has been a member of the national team since 1999. She announced her retirement on 1 November 2012 and began working for the Special Olympics organisation on 1 January 2013. As an Assistant Coach for the USA Artistic Swimming Senior National Team from 2015 to 2018, Khasyanova helped lead the team at various major international competitions. She worked with both the Senior and Junior National Teams, coaching at competitions in China, Japan, Canada, and the U.S., as well as the 2017 Senior World Championships and 2018 Junior World Championships in Hungary. Since joining Stanford University as an Assistant Coach in 2018, Khasyanova has helped the artistic swimming team secure multiple championships. She was instrumental in leading the team to its Tenth National Championship title in 2025 and to its Ninth National Championship title in 2021. The team also had podium finishes at the Collegiate National Championships, finishing second in 2019, 2022, 2023, and 2024. Additionally, under her guidance, the Stanford team has won four consecutive MPSF Conference Championships from 2022 to 2025.
