= 2005 World Aquatics Championships =

Aquatic sports competition

11th FINA World Championships
- Host city: Montreal, Canada
- Date(s): July 16–31, 2005
- Officially opened by: Adrienne Clarkson

The 2005 World Aquatics Championships (French: Championnats du monde de natation 2005) or the XI FINA World Championships were held in Montreal, Quebec, Canada from July 16 to July 31, 2005. They took place in Parc Jean-Drapeau on Saint Helen's Island.

== Competition ==
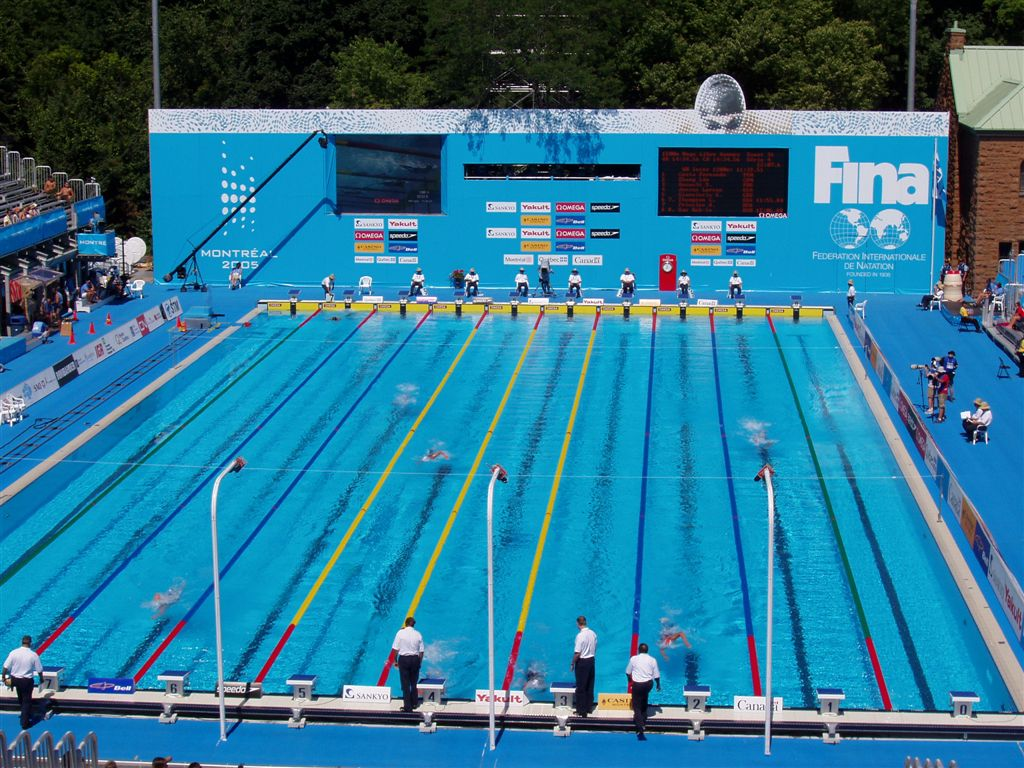
Swimming competition pool

=== Medal standings ===
* Host nation (Canada)

Rank	Nation	Gold	Silver	Bronze	Total
1	United States	17	15	7	39
2	Australia	13	8	4	25
3	China	5	5	7	17
4	Russia	5	3	2	10
5	Canada*	3	4	3	10
6	France	3	1	1	5
7	Germany	2	7	4	13
8	Hungary	2	2	1	5
9	Zimbabwe	2	2	0	4
10	South Africa	2	1	2	5
11	Netherlands	2	1	1	4
12	Poland	2	0	2	4
13	Italy	1	3	3	7
14	Spain	1	1	3	5
15	Greece	1	0	1	2
16	Serbia and Montenegro	1	0	0	1
17	Japan	0	5	7	12
18	Sweden	0	1	2	3
19	Austria	0	1	1	2
20	Croatia	0	1	0	1
20	Cuba	0	1	0	1
20	Switzerland	0	1	0	1
23	Great Britain	0	0	4	4
24	Ukraine	0	0	3	3
25	Bulgaria	0	0	2	2
25	Tunisia	0	0	2	2
Totals (26 entries)		62	63	62	187

ordered by gold medals

=== Diving ===
Men

Event	Gold	Silver	Bronze
1 m springboard	Alexandre Despatie; Canada	Xu Xiang; China	Wang Feng; China
3 m springboard	Alexandre Despatie; Canada	Troy Dumais; United States	He Chong; China
10 m platform	Hu Jia; China	José Guerra; Cuba	Gleb Galperin; Russia
3 m springboard synchro	He Chong; China; Wang Feng; China	Tobias Schellenberg; Germany; Andreas Wels; Germany	Justin Dumais; United States; Troy Dumais; United States
10 m platform synchro	Dmitry Dobroskok; Russia; Gleb Galperin; Russia	Yang Jinghui; China; Hu Jia; China	Peter Waterfield; Great Britain; Leon Taylor; Great Britain

Women

Event	Gold	Silver	Bronze
1 m springboard	Blythe Hartley; Canada	Wu Minxia; China	Heike Fischer; Germany
3 m springboard	Guo Jingjing; China	Wu Minxia; China	Tania Cagnotto; Italy
10 m platform	Laura Ann Wilkinson; United States	Loudy Tourky; Australia	Jia Tong; China
3 m springboard synchro	Li Ting; China; Guo Jingjing; China	Ditte Kotzian; Germany; Conny Schmalfuss; Germany	Olena Fedorova; Ukraine; Kristina Ishchenko; Ukraine
10 m platform synchro	Jia Tong; China; Yuan Peilin; China	Chantelle Newbery; Australia; Loudy Tourky; Australia	Meaghan Benfeito; Canada; Roseline Filion; Canada

=== Open water swimming ===
Men

Event	Gold	Silver	Bronze
5 km	Thomas Lurz; Germany	Chip Peterson; United States	Simone Ercoli; Italy
10 km	Chip Peterson; United States	Thomas Lurz; Germany	Petar Stoychev; Bulgaria
25 km	David Meca; Spain	Brendan Capell; Australia	Petar Stoychev; Bulgaria

Women

Event	Gold	Silver	Bronze
5 km	Larisa Ilchenko; Russia	Margy Keefe; United States	Edith van Dijk; Netherlands
10 km	Edith van Dijk; Netherlands	Federica Vitale; Italy	Britta Kamrau; Germany
25 km	Edith van Dijk; Netherlands	Britta Kamrau; Germany	Laura la Piana; Italy

=== Swimming ===
Men

Event	Gold	Silver	Bronze
50 m freestyle	Roland Schoeman; South Africa	Duje Draganja; Croatia	Bartosz Kizierowski; Poland
100 m freestyle	Filippo Magnini; Italy	Roland Schoeman; South Africa	Ryk Neethling; South Africa
200 m freestyle	Michael Phelps; United States	Grant Hackett; Australia	Ryk Neethling; South Africa
400 m freestyle	Grant Hackett; Australia	Yuri Prilukov; Russia	Oussama Mellouli; Tunisia
800 m freestyle	Grant Hackett; Australia	Larsen Jensen; United States	Yuri Prilukov; Russia
1500 m freestyle	Grant Hackett; Australia	Larsen Jensen; United States	David Davies; Great Britain
50 m backstroke	Aristeidis Grigoriadis; Greece	Matt Welsh; Australia	Liam Tancock; Great Britain
100 m backstroke	Aaron Peirsol; United States	Randall Bal; United States	László Cseh; Hungary
200 m backstroke	Aaron Peirsol; United States	Markus Rogan; Austria	Ryan Lochte; United States
50 m breaststroke	Mark Warnecke; Germany	Mark Gangloff; United States	Kosuke Kitajima; Japan
100 m breaststroke	Brendan Hansen; United States	Kosuke Kitajima; Japan	Hugues Duboscq; France
200 m breaststroke	Brendan Hansen; United States	Mike Brown; Canada	Genki Imamura; Japan
50 m butterfly	Roland Schoeman; South Africa	Ian Crocker; United States	Sergiy Breus; Ukraine
100 m butterfly	Ian Crocker; United States	Michael Phelps; United States	Andriy Serdinov; Ukraine
200 m butterfly	Paweł Korzeniowski; Poland	Takeshi Matsuda; Japan	Wu Peng; China
200 m individual medley	Michael Phelps; United States	László Cseh; Hungary	Ryan Lochte; United States
400 m individual medley	László Cseh; Hungary	Luca Marin; Italy	Oussama Mellouli; Tunisia
4×100 m freestyle relay	United States (USA); Michael Phelps; Neil Walker; Nate Dusing; Jason Lezak	Canada (CAN); Yannick Lupien; Rick Say; Mike Mintenko; Brent Hayden	Australia (AUS); Michael Klim; Andrew Mewing; Leith Brodie; Patrick Murphy
4×200 m freestyle relay	United States (USA); Michael Phelps; Ryan Lochte; Peter Vanderkaay; Klete Keller	Canada (CAN); Brent Hayden; Colin Russell; Rick Say; Andrew Hurd	Australia (AUS); Nicholas Sprenger; Patrick Murphy; Andrew Mewing; Grant Hackett
4×100 m medley relay	United States (USA); Aaron Peirsol; Brendan Hansen; Ian Crocker; Jason Lezak	Russia (RUS); Arkady Vyatchanin; Dmitry Komornikov; Igor Marchenko; Andrey Kapralov	Japan (JPN); Tomomi Morita; Kosuke Kitajima; Ryo Takayasu; Daisuke Hosokawa

Women

Event	Gold	Silver	Bronze
50 m freestyle	Libby Lenton; Australia	Marleen Veldhuis; Netherlands	Zhu Yingwen; China
100 m freestyle	Jodie Henry; Australia	Malia Metella; France	—
100 m freestyle	Jodie Henry; Australia	Natalie Coughlin; United States	—
200 m freestyle	Solenne Figuès; France	Federica Pellegrini; Italy	Josefin Lillhage; Sweden
200 m freestyle	Solenne Figuès; France	Federica Pellegrini; Italy	Yang Yu; China
400 m freestyle	Laure Manaudou; France	Ai Shibata; Japan	Caitlin McClatchey; Great Britain
800 m freestyle	Kate Ziegler; United States	Brittany Reimer; Canada	Ai Shibata; Japan
1500 m freestyle	Kate Ziegler; United States	Flavia Rigamonti; Switzerland	Brittany Reimer; Canada
50 m backstroke	Giaan Rooney; Australia	Gao Chang; China	Antje Buschschulte; Germany
100 m backstroke	Kirsty Coventry; Zimbabwe	Antje Buschschulte; Germany	Natalie Coughlin; United States
200 m backstroke	Kirsty Coventry; Zimbabwe	Margaret Hoelzer; United States	Reiko Nakamura; Japan
50 m breaststroke	Jade Edmistone; Australia	Jessica Hardy; United States	Brooke Hanson; Australia
100 m breaststroke	Leisel Jones; Australia	Jessica Hardy; United States	Tara Kirk; United States
200 m breaststroke	Leisel Jones; Australia	Anne Poleska; Germany	Mirna Jukić; Austria
50 m butterfly	Danni Miatke; Australia	Anna-Karin Kammerling; Sweden	Therese Alshammar; Sweden
100 m butterfly	Jessicah Schipper; Australia	Libby Lenton; Australia	Otylia Jędrzejczak; Poland
200 m butterfly	Otylia Jędrzejczak; Poland	Jessicah Schipper; Australia	Yuko Nakanishi; Japan
200 m individual medley	Katie Hoff; United States	Kirsty Coventry; Zimbabwe	Lara Carroll; Australia
400 m individual medley	Katie Hoff; United States	Kirsty Coventry; Zimbabwe	Kaitlin Sandeno; United States
4×100 m freestyle relay	Australia (AUS); Jodie Henry; Alice Mills; Shayne Reese; Libby Lenton	Germany (GER); Petra Dallmann; Antje Buschschulte; Annika Liebs; Daniela Gotz	United States (USA); Natalie Coughlin; Kara Lynn Joyce; Lacey Nymeyer; Amanda Weir
4×200 m freestyle relay	United States (USA); Natalie Coughlin; Katie Hoff; Whitney Myers; Kaitlin Sandeno	Australia (AUS); Libby Lenton; Shayne Reese; Bronte Barratt; Linda Mackenzie	China (CHN); Yingwen Zhu; Jiaying Pang; Yafei Zhou; Yang Yu
4×100 m medley relay	Australia (AUS); Sophie Edington; Leisel Jones; Jessicah Schipper; Libby Lenton	United States (USA); Natalie Coughlin; Jessica Hardy; Rachel Komisarz; Amanda Weir	Germany (GER); Antje Buschschulte; Sarah Poewe; Annika Mehlhorn; Daniela Gotz

=== Synchronised swimming ===
Event	Gold	Silver	Bronze
Solo routine	Virginie Dedieu; France	Natalia Ischenko; Russia	Gemma Mengual; Spain
Duet routine	Anastasia Davydova; Russia; Anastasia Ermakova; Russia	Gemma Mengual; Spain; Paola Tirados; Spain	Saho Harada; Japan; Emiko Suzuki; Japan
Team routine	Russia (RUS); Maria Gromova; Natalia Ischenko; Elvira Khasyanova; Olga Kuzhela; Olga Larkina; Elena Ovchinnikova; Svetlana Romashina; Anna Shorina	Japan (JPN); Saho Harada; Naoko Kawashima; Kanako Kitao; Hiromi Kobayashi; Erika Komura; Takako Konishi; Ayako Matsumura; Emiko Suzuki; Masako Tachibana	Spain (ESP); Raquel Corral; Andrea Fuentes; Tina Fuentes; Thais Henríquez; Gemma Mengual; Irina Rodríguez; Paola Tirados; Christina Violan
Combination routine	Russia (RUS); Anastasia Davydova; Anastasia Ermakova; Maria Gromova; Natalia Ischenko; Elvira Khasyanova; Olga Kuzhela; Olga Larkina; Elena Ovchinnikova; Svetlana Romashina; Anna Shorina	Japan (JPN); Saho Harada; Naoko Kawashima; Kanako Kitao; Hiromi Kobayashi; Erika Komura; Takako Konishi; Ayako Matsumura; Emiko Suzuki; Masako Tachibana	Spain (ESP); Raquel Corral; Andrea Fuentes; Tina Fuentes; Thais Henríquez; Gemma Mengual; Gisela Morón; Irina Rodríguez; Paola Tirados; Christina Violan

=== Water polo ===
Men

Event	Gold	Silver	Bronze
Team	Serbia and Montenegro; Denis Šefik; Petar Trbojević; Nikola Janović; Vanja Udovičić; Dejan Savić; Danilo Ikodinović; Slobodan Nikić; Vladimir Gojković; Boris Zloković; Aleksandar Šapić; Vladimir Vujasinović; Predrag Jokić; Zdravko Radić	Hungary; Zoltán Szécsi; Dániel Varga; Norbert Madaras; Ádám Steinmetz; Tamás Kásás; Attila Vári; Gergely Kiss; Csaba Kiss; Rajmund Fodor; Márton Szívós; István Gergely; Tamás Molnár; Péter Biros	Greece; Georgios Reppas; Anastasios Schizas; Dimitrios Mazis; Emmanouil Mylonakis; Theodoros Chatzitheodorou; Argyris Theodoropoulos; Christos Afroudakis; Georgios Ntoskas; Georgios Afroudakis; Stefanos-Petros Santa; Antonios Vlontakis; Manthos Voulgarakis; Nikolaos Deligiannis

Women

Event	Gold	Silver	Bronze
Team	Hungary; Patricia Horvath; Eszter Tomaskovics; Khrisctina Serfozo; Dora Kisteleki; Mercedes Stieber; Andrea Toth; Rita Dravucz; Krisztina Zantleitner; Orsolya Takacs; Aniko Pelle; Agnes Valkay; Fruzsina Bravik; Timea Benko	United States; Emily Feher; Heather Petri; Ericka Lorenz; Brenda Villa; Lauren Wenger; Natalie Golda; Kristina Kunkel; Erika Figge; Jaime Hipp; Kelly Rulon; Moriah van Norman; Drue Wawrzynski; Thalia Munro	Canada; Rachel Riddell; Krystina Alogbo; Whynter Lamarre; Susan Gardiner; Tara Campbell; Marie Luc Arpin; Cora Campbell; Dominique Perreault; Ann Dow; Jana Salat; Valérie Dionne; Christine Robinson; Johanne Bégin

== Bidding for and organizing the event ==
Montreal became the first city in North America to hold the FINA World Aquatics Championships.

The venue for the games was itself controversial. The games were awarded initially to Montreal, and then taken away again in February 2005 when the city was unable to raise sufficient funding, with other cities indicating their willingness to take the games on. However following promises of funding from various levels of government, Montreal re-bid for the games and they were re-awarded to the city.

On July 16, before the start of the 2005 event, FINA selected the host city for the 2009 World Aquatics Championships — Rome, Italy.
