= Evanthia Makrygianni =

Greek synchronized swimmer

Personal information
- Born: 30 August 1986 (age 39) Volos, Greece

Sport
- Sport: Synchronised swimming
Medal record
Representing Greece
European Championships
| Bronze medal – third place | 2004 Madrid | Team, free routine |
| Bronze medal – third place | 2006 Budapest | Duet |

Evanthia Makrygianni (born 30 August 1986) is a Greek former synchronized swimmer who competed in the 2008 Summer Olympics.
