= Ariane Schneider =

Swiss synchronized swimmer

Personal information
- Born: 12 March 1985 (age 41) Bern, Switzerland

Sport
- Sport: Synchronised swimming

Ariane Schneider (born 12 March 1985) is a Swiss synchronized swimmer who competed in the 2008 Summer Olympics.
