= Andrea Fuentes =

Spanish synchronized swimmer

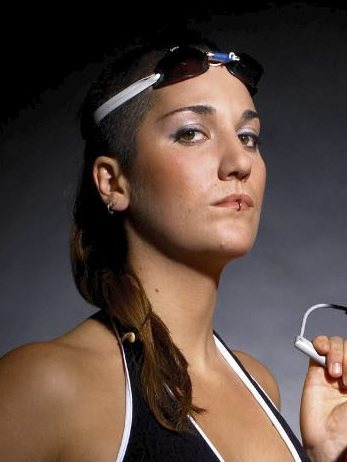

Personal information
- Nationality: Spain
- Born: 7 April 1983 (age 43) Valls, Spain
- Height: 1.69 m (5 ft 7 in)

Sport
- Sport: Swimming
- Strokes: Synchronized swimming
Medal record
Synchronized swimming
Representing Spain
Event	1st	2nd	3rd
Olympic Games	0	3	1
World Championships	1	7	8
European Championships (SC)	5	6	0
Total	6	15	7
Olympic Games
Silver medal – second place	2008 Beijing	Women's duet
Silver medal – second place	2008 Beijing	Team competition
Silver medal – second place	2012 London	Women's duet
Bronze medal – third place	2012 London	Team competition
World Championships
Gold medal – first place	2009 Rome	Free Routine Combination
Silver medal – second place	2003 Barcelona	Free combination
Silver medal – second place	2007 Melbourne	Team Free routine
Silver medal – second place	2009 Rome	Duet Technical Routine
Silver medal – second place	2009 Rome	Duet Free Routine
Silver medal – second place	2009 Rome	Team Technical Routine
Silver medal – second place	2009 Rome	Team Free Routine
Silver medal – second place	2011 Shanghai	Solo free routine
Bronze medal – third place	2005 Montreal	Team
Bronze medal – third place	2005 Montreal	Free combination
Bronze medal – third place	2007 Melbourne	Team technical routine
Bronze medal – third place	2011 Shanghai	Duet technical routine
Bronze medal – third place	2011 Shanghai	Team technical routine
Bronze medal – third place	2011 Shanghai	Solo technical routine
Bronze medal – third place	2011 Shanghai	Duet free routine
Bronze medal – third place	2011 Shanghai	Team free routine
European Championships
Gold medal – first place	2008 Eindhoven	Duet
Gold medal – first place	2008 Eindhoven	Team
Gold medal – first place	2008 Eindhoven	Combination
Gold medal – first place	2012 Eindhoven	Team
Gold medal – first place	2012 Eindhoven	Combination
Silver medal – second place	2010 Budapest	Solo
Silver medal – second place	2010 Budapest	Duet
Silver medal – second place	2010 Budapest	Team
Silver medal – second place	2010 Budapest	Combination
Silver medal – second place	2012 Eindhoven	Solo
Silver medal – second place	2012 Eindhoven	Duet
- Updated on 22 May 2015

Andrea Fuentes Fache (born 7 April 1983 in Valls, Tarragona) is a Spanish swimming coach and former synchronised swimmer. She is the most decorated swimmer in the history of the Spanish national team, with four Olympic, 16 World Championship and 11 European Championship medals: her four Olympic medals also make her the most decorated Spanish female Olympian of all time, alongside Arantxa Sánchez Vicario and Mireia Belmonte.

== Career ==
She joined the national synchronised swimming team in 1999. Andrea has competed at the 2004, 2008 and 2012 Summer Olympics, where she has won four medals in the women's duet and women's team events. She retired from elite competition in January 2013, citing demotivation as a result of a conflict between the Royal Spanish Swimming Federation and the head coach of the national team, Ana Tarrés. Since retiring she has become a synchronised swimming coach.

=== Coaching ===
As of 2018, Fuentes became the USA senior national team head coach, working alongside Reem Abdalazem. The two have a pre-established work relationship, having worked together in synchro for four years.

In June 2022, Fuentes was poolside coaching during the 2022 World Aquatics Championships in Budapest in which the USA team was competing. Artistic swimmer Anita Alvarez fainted and sank to the bottom of the pool. Fuentes dove in to bring her to the surface. Medical checks after the rescue showed that Alvarez had apparently recovered and planned on continuing to compete.

== Personal life ==
In 2014 Fuentes gave birth to a son, Kilian, from her relationship with gymnast and fellow Olympian Víctor Cano. Her sister Tina Fuentes, also a synchronized swimmer died in 2018 at the age of 34.

== See also ==
- List of Olympic medalists in synchronized swimming
