= Paola Tirados =

Spanish synchronized swimmer

Personal information
- Born: 14 January 1980 (age 46) Las Palmas de Gran Canaria, Canary Islands

Sport
- Sport: Synchronised swimming
Medal record
Representing Spain
Olympic Games
Silver medal – second place	2008 Beijing	Team Competition
World Championships
Silver medal – second place	2003 Barcelona	Free combination
Silver medal – second place	2005 Montreal	Duet
Silver medal – second place	2007 Melbourne	Duet technical
Silver medal – second place	2007 Melbourne	Duet free
Silver medal – second place	2007 Melbourne	Team free
Bronze medal – third place	2003 Barcelona	Duet
Bronze medal – third place	2005 Montreal	Free combination
Bronze medal – third place	2005 Montreal	Team
Bronze medal – third place	2007 Melbourne	Team technical
European Championships
Gold medal – first place	2004 Madrid	Combination free
Gold medal – first place	2008 Eindhoven	Combination free
Gold medal – first place	2008 Eindhoven	Team
Silver medal – second place	2002 Berlin	Duet
Silver medal – second place	2004 Madrid	Duet
Silver medal – second place	2006 Budapest	Duet
Silver medal – second place	2006 Budapest	Free combination
Silver medal – second place	2006 Budapest	Team
Bronze medal – third place	2000 Helsinki	Duet

Paola Tirados Sánchez (Note: In this Spanish name, the first or paternal surname is Tirados and the second or maternal family name is Sánchez.) (born 14 January 1980 in ) is a Spanish synchronized swimmer. She has competed at the 2000, 2004 and 2008 Summer Olympics.
