= Synchronised swimming at the 2007 World Aquatics Championships =

The Synchronized Swimming competition at the 2007 World Aquatics Championships was held from March 17 to March 24.

== Medal table ==
Total medals won across the synchronized swimming disciplines
| Place | Nation | 1st place, gold medalist(s) | 2nd place, silver medalist(s) | 3rd place, bronze medalist(s) | Total |
|---|---|---|---|---|---|
| 1 | Russia | 6 | 1 | 0 | 7 |
| 2 | France | 1 | 0 | 0 | 1 |
| 3 | Spain | 0 | 4 | 2 | 6 |
| 4 | Japan | 0 | 2 | 4 | 6 |
| 5 | United States | 0 | 0 | 1 | 1 |
| Total | | 7 | 7 | 7 | 21 |

== Medal summary ==
Medalists per synchronized swimming event
| Event | Gold | Silver | Bronze |
|---|---|---|---|
| Solo Technical Routine | Natalia Ischenko (RUS); 99.000 | Gemma Mengual (ESP); 98.000 | Saho Harada (JPN); 96.833 |
| Solo Free Routine | Virginie Dedieu (FRA); 99.500 | Natalia Ischenko (RUS); 98.500 | Gemma Mengual (ESP); 98.000 |
| Duet Technical Routine | Anastasia Davydova Anastasia Ermakova (RUS); 98.833 | Gemma Mengual Paola Tirados (ESP); 97.500 | Saho Harada Emiko Suzuki (JPN); 97.167 |
| Duet Free Routine | Anastasia Davydova Anastasia Ermakova (RUS); 99.333 | Gemma Mengual Paola Tirados (ESP); 97.667 | Emiko Suzuki Ayako Matsumura (JPN); 97.333 |
| Team Technical Routine | Russia (RUS); 99.000 | Japan (JPN); 97.833 | Spain (ESP); 97.167 |
| Team Free Routine | Russia (RUS); 99.000 | Spain (ESP); 98.500 | Japan (JPN); 97.334 |
| Free Routine Combination | Russia (RUS); 99.000 | Japan (JPN); 97.833 | United States (USA); 96.500 |
