= Laura López (synchronized swimmer) =

Spanish synchronized swimmer (born 1988)

Personal information
- Full name: Laura López Valle
- Nationality: Spain
- Born: 24 April 1988 (age 38) Valladolid, Spain
- Height: 1.68 m (5 ft 6 in)
- Weight: 59 kg (130 lb)

Sport
- Sport: Swimming
- Strokes: Synchronized swimming
- Club: CN Alcorcón Arena
Medal record
Women's synchronized swimming
Representing Spain
Olympic Games
Silver medal – second place	2008 Beijing	Team competition

Laura López Valle (Note: In this Spanish name, the first or paternal surname is López and the second or maternal family name is Valle.) (born 24 April 1988) is a Spanish synchronized swimmer. She competed in the women's team event at the 2008 Summer Olympics where she won a silver medal. She was awarded the 2025 Castile and León Sports Award for her distinguished career in the 2008 European Championship and the 2008 Olympic Games, and for her coaching work with the national team.
