= Naoko Kawashima =

Japanese synchronized swimmer

Personal information
- Born: April 7, 1981 (age 45) Tokyo, Japan

Sport
- Sport: Synchronised swimming
Medal record
Representing Japan
Olympic Games
Silver medal – second place	2004 Athens	Team
World Championships
Gold medal – first place	2003 Barcelona	Team, free routine
Silver medal – second place	2001 Fukuoka	Team
Silver medal – second place	2003 Barcelona	Team
Silver medal – second place	2005 Montreal	Team, free routine
Silver medal – second place	2005 Montreal	Team, technical
Silver medal – second place	2007 Melbourne	Team, free routine
Bronze medal – third place	2007 Melbourne	Team, free

Naoko Kawashima (born 7 April 1981) is a Japanese synchronized swimmer who competed in the 2004 and 2008 Summer Olympics.
