= Gemma Mengual =

Spanish synchronized swimmer

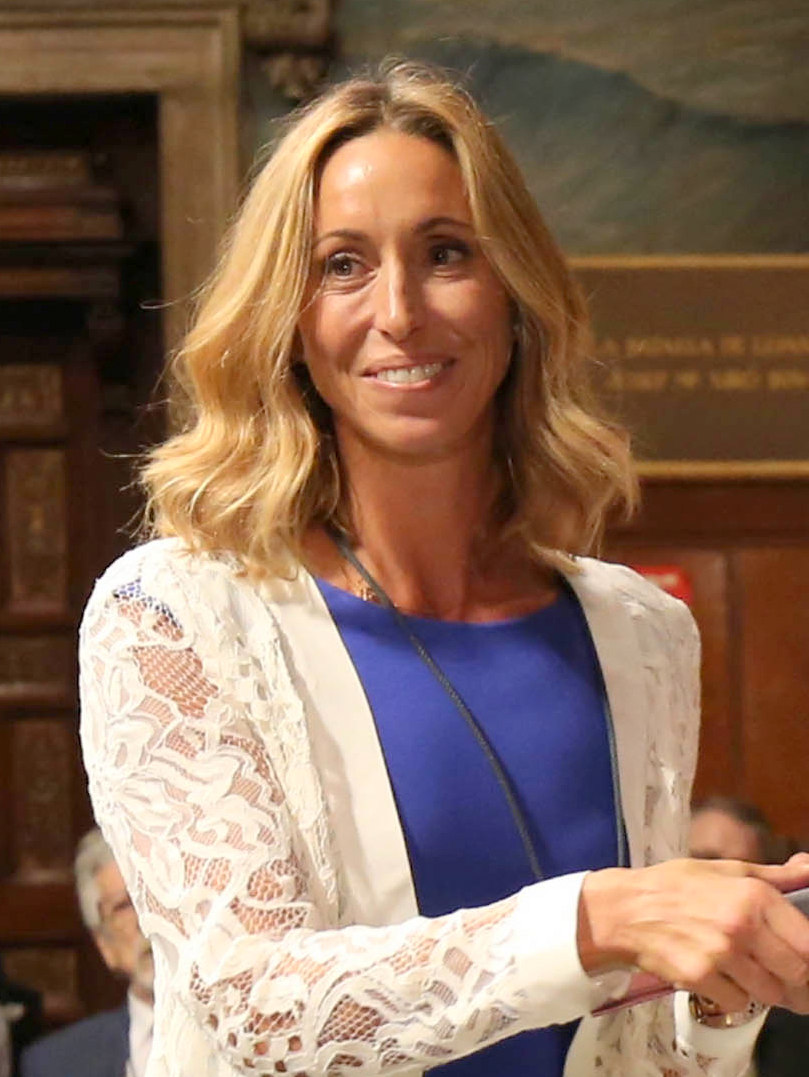

Personal information
- Full name: Gemma Mengual Civil
- Nationality: Spain
- Born: 12 April 1977 (age 49) Barcelona, Spain
- Height: 1.73 m (5 ft 8 in)
- Weight: 54 kg (119 lb)

Sport
- Sport: Swimming
- Strokes: Synchronised swimming
- Club: CN Sabadell
Medal record
Synchronized swimming
Representing Spain
Olympic Games
Silver medal – second place	2008 Beijing	Women's duet
Silver medal – second place	2008 Beijing	Team Competition
World Championships
Gold medal – first place	2009 Rome	Free Routine Combination
Silver medal – second place	2005 Montreal	Duet
Silver medal – second place	2007 Melbourne	Solo Technical Routine
Silver medal – second place	2007 Melbourne	Duet Technical Routine
Silver medal – second place	2007 Melbourne	Duet Free Routine
Silver medal – second place	2007 Melbourne	Team Free Routine
Silver medal – second place	2009 Rome	Solo Technical Routine
Silver medal – second place	2009 Rome	Solo Free Routine
Silver medal – second place	2009 Rome	Duet Technical Routine
Silver medal – second place	2009 Rome	Duet Free Routine
Silver medal – second place	2009 Rome	Team Free Routine
Bronze medal – third place	2003 Barcelona	Solo
Bronze medal – third place	2003 Barcelona	Duet
Bronze medal – third place	2005 Montreal	Solo
Bronze medal – third place	2005 Montreal	Team competition
Bronze medal – third place	2007 Melbourne	Solo Free Routine
Bronze medal – third place	2007 Melbourne	Team Technical Routine
- Updated on 14 December 2014

Gemma Mengual Civil (born 12 April 1977 in Barcelona, Catalonia, Spain) is a Spanish synchronised swimmer. She has competed at the 2000, 2004 and 2008 Summer Olympics. On 15 February 2012 she announced her retirement. After retiring she became involved with coaching the national synchronised swimming team. However in June 2015 Mengual announced that she would return to competition with the aim of competing at the 2015 World Aquatics Championships in Kazan, Russia, in the mixed duet with Pau Ribas, whom she had previously coached. Although she had previously indicated that she would not compete beyond the World Championships, in September of that year she confirmed via social media that she would compete in the duet in the 2016 Summer Olympics with Ona Carbonell.

During the 2020 Olympic Games (celebrated in 2021 due to COVID) she collaborated in the broadcast for the swimming-pool and floor events giving technical insight and expert opinion on the Olympian sport women.

== Medals ==
- 2003 World Aquatics Championships – Bronze at Solo and Duet
- 2005 World Aquatics Championships – Bronze at Solo and Team; Silver at Duet
- 2006 European Aquatics Championships – Silver at Solo and Duet Free Routine
- Synchronized Swimming at the 2007 World Aquatics Championships – Silver at the Solo Technical Routine and bronze at the Solo Free Routine
- 2008 European Aquatics Championships – Golds in all events.
- 2008 Summer Olympics – Silver in Duet and Team.

Awards
Preceded by Beatriz Ferrer-Salat	Spanish Sportswoman of the Year; 2005	Succeeded by Laia Sanz
