= Masako Tachibana =

Japanese synchronized swimmer

Personal information
- Born: November 23, 1983 (age 42) Osaka Prefecture, Japan

Sport
- Sport: Synchronised swimming
Medal record
Representing Japan
World Championships
Silver medal – second place	2005 Montreal	Team
Silver medal – second place	2005 Montreal	Team, free routine
Silver medal – second place	2007 Melbourne	Team, free routine
Silver medal – second place	2007 Melbourne	Team, technical
Bronze medal – third place	2007 Melbourne	Team, free

Masako Tachibana (born 23 November 1983) is a Japanese synchronized swimmer who competed in the 2008 Summer Olympics.
