= Olga Kuzhela =

Russian synchronized swimmer

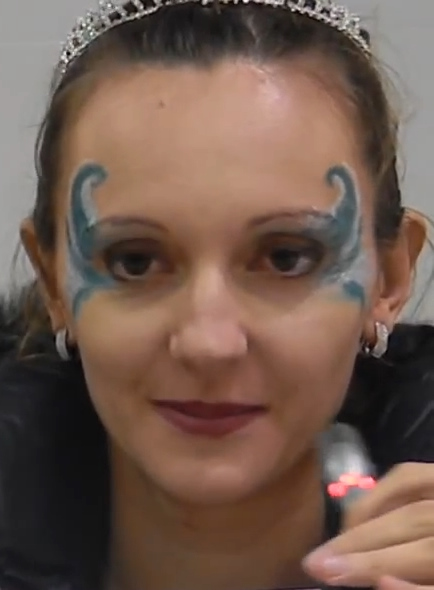

Personal information
- Born: 29 August 1985 (age 40) Leningrad, RSFSR, USSR
Medal record
Representing Russia
Olympic Games
Gold medal – first place	2008 Beijing	Team Competition
World Championships
Gold medal – first place	2005 Montreal	Team
Gold medal – first place	2005 Montreal	Team, free routine
Gold medal – first place	2007 Melbourne	Team, free
Gold medal – first place	2007 Melbourne	Team, technical
Gold medal – first place	2007 Melbourne	Team, free routine
European Championships
Gold medal – first place	2006 Budapest	Team, free
Gold medal – first place	2006 Budapest	Team, combination
Gold medal – first place	2010 Budapest	Combination

Olga Petrovna Kuzhela (Russian: Ольга Петровна Кужела) (born 29 August 1985 in Leningrad) is a Russian competitor in synchronized swimming. She won a gold medal in team competition at the 2008 Summer Olympics, now is presenter of Russia Today.
