= Anna Shorina =

Russian synchronized swimmer

Personal information
- Born: 26 August 1982 (age 43) Moscow, RSFSR, USSR
Medal record
Representing Russia
Olympic Games
Gold medal – first place	2004 Athens	Team
Gold medal – first place	2008 Beijing	Team
World Championships
Gold medal – first place	2001 Fukuoka	Team
Gold medal – first place	2003 Barcelona	Team
Gold medal – first place	2005 Montreal	Team
Gold medal – first place	2007 Melbourne	Team
European Championships
Gold medal – first place	1999 Istanbul	Team
Gold medal – first place	2000 Helsinki	Team
Gold medal – first place	2002 Berlin	Team
Gold medal – first place	2004 Madrid	Team
Gold medal – first place	2006 Budapest	Team

Anna Vladimirovna Shorina (Russian: Анна Владимировна Шорина, 26 August 1982, Moscow, USSR) is a Russian synchro-swimmer.

She has Olympic gold medal in team competition in 2004, won World (2001, 2003, 2005, 2007) and European (1999, 2000, 2002, 2004, 2006) Championships and other tournaments.

She is a member of National team since 1999, now she works in FC Terek Grozny.
