= Raquel Corral =

Spanish synchronized swimmer

Personal information
- Born: 1 December 1980 (age 45) Madrid, Spain

Sport
- Sport: Swimming
Medal record
Representing Spain
Olympic Games
Silver medal – second place	2008 Beijing	Team Competition
World Championships
Gold medal – first place	2009 Rome	Free Routine Combination
Silver medal – second place	2009 Rome	Team Technical Routine
Silver medal – second place	2009 Rome	Team Free Routine
Silver medal – second place	2003 Barcelona	Free combination
Bronze medal – third place	2005 Montreal	Team
Bronze medal – third place	2005 Montreal	Free combination

Raquel Corral Aznar (Note: In this Spanish name, the first or paternal surname is Corral and the second or maternal family name is Aznar.) (born 1 December 1980) is a Spanish synchronized swimmer who competed at the Olympics in 2004 and 2008 where she won a silver medal in the team event.
