= Emiko Suzuki =

Japanese synchronized swimmer

Personal information
- Born: November 12, 1981 (age 44) Urawa, Saitama, Japan

Sport
- Sport: Swimming
Medal record
Representing Japan
Olympic Games
Silver medal – second place	2004 Athens	Team
Bronze medal – third place	2008 Beijing	Duet
World Championships
Gold medal – first place	2003 Barcelona	Team, free routine
Silver medal – second place	2001 Fukuoka	Team
Silver medal – second place	2003 Barcelona	Team
Silver medal – second place	2005 Montreal	Team
Silver medal – second place	2005 Montreal	Team, free routine
Silver medal – second place	2007 Melbourne	Team, technical
Silver medal – second place	2007 Melbourne	Team, free routine
Bronze medal – third place	2005 Montreal	Duet
Bronze medal – third place	2007 Melbourne	Duet, technical
Bronze medal – third place	2007 Melbourne	Duet, free
Bronze medal – third place	2007 Melbourne	Team, free
Asian Games
Silver medal – second place	2006 Doha	Duet

Emiko Suzuki (鈴木 絵美子, Suzuki Emiko; born November 12, 1981) is a Japanese synchronized swimmer. She has competed at the 2004 and 2008 Summer Olympics.
