= Yelena Ovchinnikova =

Russian synchronized swimmer

Personal information
- Born: 17 July 1982 (age 43) Moscow, RSFSR, USSR
Medal record
Representing Russia
Olympic Games
Gold medal – first place	2008 Beijing	Team Competition
World Championships
Gold medal – first place	2001 Fukuoka	Team
Gold medal – first place	2003 Barcelona	Team
Gold medal – first place	2005 Montreal	Team
Gold medal – first place	2005 Montreal	Team, free routine
Gold medal – first place	2007 Melbourne	Team, free
Gold medal – first place	2007 Melbourne	Team, free routine
Gold medal – first place	2007 Melbourne	Team, technical
European Championships
Gold medal – first place	2002 Berlin	Team
Gold medal – first place	2006 Budapest	Team, free
Gold medal – first place	2006 Budapest	Team, free routine

Yelena Valeryevna Ovchinnikova (Russian: Елена Валерьевна Овчинникова) (born 17 July 1982) is a Russian competitor in synchronized swimming. She won a gold medal in team competition at the 2008 Summer Olympics.
