= Takako Konishi (synchronized swimmer) =

Japanese synchronized swimmer

Personal information
- Born: September 25, 1986 (age 39)

Sport
- Sport: Synchronised swimming
Medal record
Representing Japan
Asian Games
Silver medal – second place	2006 Doha	Team

Takako Konishi (born 25 September 1986) is a Japanese synchronized swimmer. She was part of the Japanese team that took the silver medal at the 2006 Asian Games in Doha. Konishi was a reserve participant for the team that took the silver medal at the 2004 Summer Olympics.
