= Anastasia Davydova =

Russian synchronized swimmer

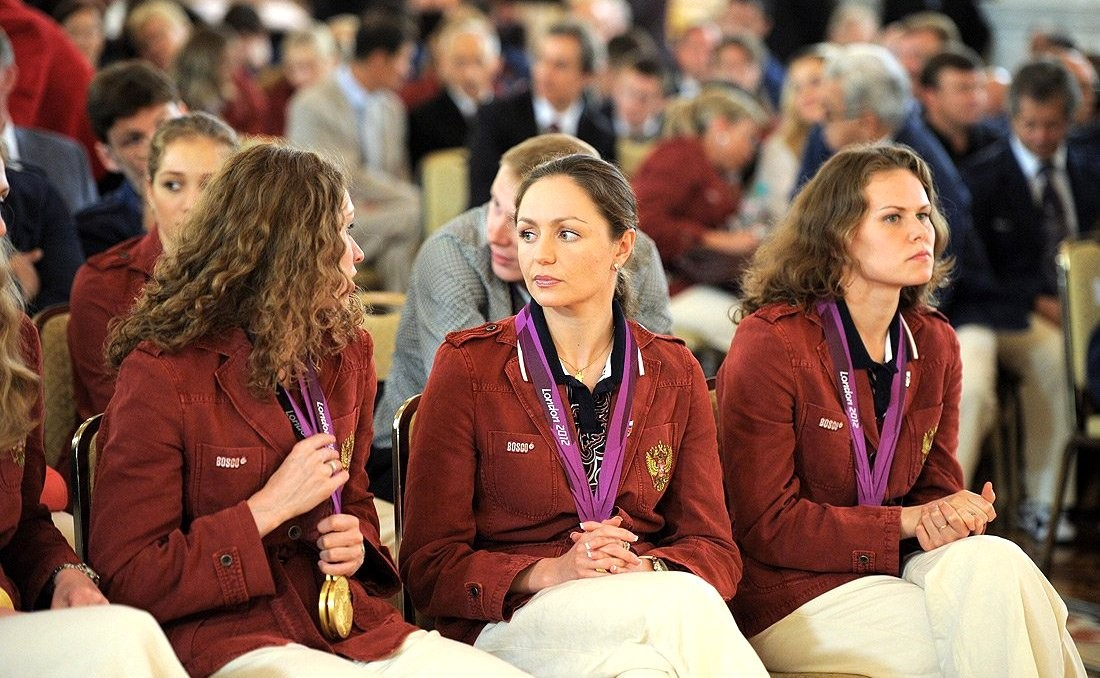
- Natalia Ishchenko, Davydova and Mariya Gromova

Personal information
- Full name: Anastasiya Semyonovna Davydova
- Nationality: Russia
- Born: 2 February 1983 (age 43) Moscow, Russian SFSR, Soviet Union
- Height: 1.70 m (5 ft 7 in)
- Weight: 54 kg (119 lb)

Sport
- Sport: Swimming
- Strokes: Synchronised swimming
- Club: Dynamo Moscow, CSKA Moscow
Medal record
Women's synchronised swimming
Representing Russia
Event	1st	2nd	3rd
Olympic Games	5	0	0
World Championships	13	1	0
Total	18	1	0
Olympic Games
Gold medal – first place	2004 Athens	Duet
Gold medal – first place	2004 Athens	Team Competition
Gold medal – first place	2008 Beijing	Duet
Gold medal – first place	2008 Beijing	Team Competition
Gold medal – first place	2012 London	Team Competition
World Championships
Gold medal – first place	2001 Fukuoka	Team Routine
Gold medal – first place	2003 Barcelona	Duet Routine
Gold medal – first place	2003 Barcelona	Team Routine
Gold medal – first place	2005 Montreal	Duet Routine
Gold medal – first place	2005 Montreal	Combo routine
Gold medal – first place	2007 Melbourne	Duet Technical Routine
Gold medal – first place	2007 Melbourne	Duet Free Routine
Gold medal – first place	2007 Melbourne	Combo Routine
Gold medal – first place	2009 Rome	Duet Technical Routine
Gold medal – first place	2009 Rome	Team Free Routine
Gold medal – first place	2011 Shanghai	Team technical routine
Gold medal – first place	2011 Shanghai	Free routine combination
Gold medal – first place	2011 Shanghai	Team free routine
Silver medal – second place	2001 Fukuoka	Duet Routine

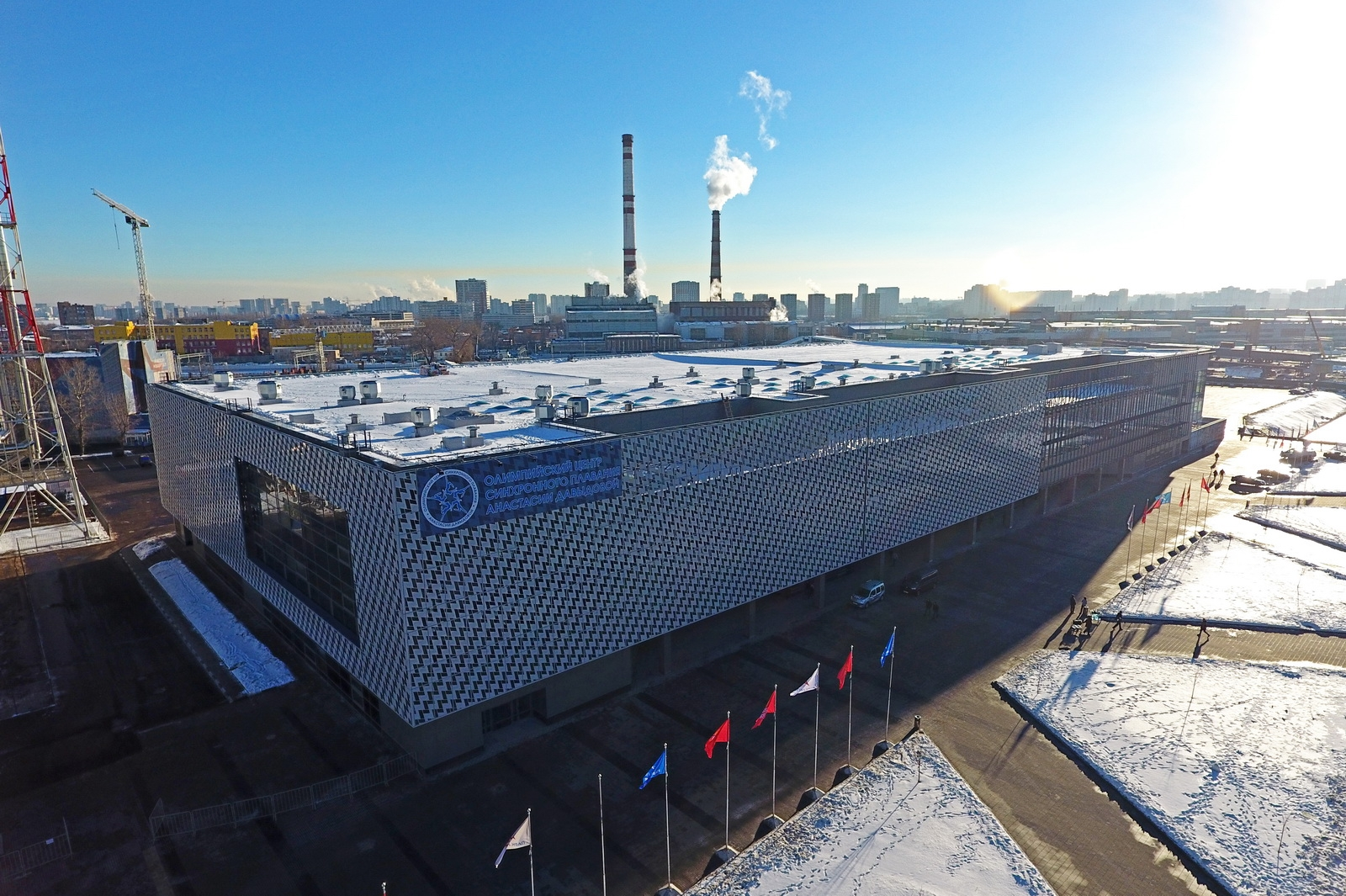
Olympic synchronized swimming centre of Davydova in Moscow

Anastasia Semyonovna Davydova (Russian: Анастасия Семёновна Давыдова; born 2 February 1983) is a Russian former synchronised swimmer and five-time Olympic gold medalist, and current coach.

== Biography ==
Davydova won gold medals in the duet competition with Anastasiya Yermakova at the 2004 Summer Olympics in Athens, 2008 Summer Olympics in Beijing, and was part of the Russian gold medal team in the 2004, 2008 and 2012 Olympics. After the London Olympics, Anastasia announced that she would retire from competition and take up coaching.

In September 2022, it was confirmed that she had left Russia, without any plans to return.
