= Ayako Matsumura =

Japanese synchronized swimmer

Personal information
- Born: January 8, 1982 (age 44) Kasugai, Aichi, Japan

Sport
- Sport: Synchronised swimming
Medal record
Representing Japan
World Championships
Silver medal – second place	2005 Montreal	Team
Silver medal – second place	2005 Montreal	Team, free routine
Silver medal – second place	2007 Melbourne	Team, free routine
Silver medal – second place	2007 Melbourne	Team, technical
Bronze medal – third place	2007 Melbourne	Duet, free
Bronze medal – third place	2007 Melbourne	Team, free
Asian Games
Silver medal – second place	2006 Doha	Team

Ayako Matsumura (松村 亜矢子, Matsumura Ayako; born 8 January 1982) is a Japanese synchronized swimmer who competed in the 2008 Summer Olympics.
