= Saho Harada =

Japanese synchronized swimmer

Personal information
- Born: November 5, 1982 (age 43) Tokyo, Japan

Sport
- Sport: Synchronised swimming
Medal record
Representing Japan
Olympic Games
Silver medal – second place	2004 Athens	Team
Bronze medal – third place	2008 Beijing	Duet
World Championships
Gold medal – first place	2003 Barcelona	Team, free routine
Silver medal – second place	2001 Fukuoka	Team
Silver medal – second place	2003 Barcelona	Team
Silver medal – second place	2005 Montreal	Team
Silver medal – second place	2005 Montreal	Team, free routine
Silver medal – second place	2007 Melbourne	Team, free routine
Bronze medal – third place	2005 Montreal	Duet
Bronze medal – third place	2007 Melbourne	Solo
Bronze medal – third place	2007 Melbourne	Team, free routine
Asian Games
Silver medal – second place	2006 Doha	Duet
Silver medal – second place	2006 Doha	Team

Saho Harada (原田 早穂, Harada Saho; born November 5, 1982) is a Japanese synchronized swimmer. She has competed at the 2004 and 2008 Summer Olympics.

Saho Harada has introduced synchronised swimming in Malta, where she has formed various teams.
