= Anastasiya Yermakova =

Russian synchronised swimmer

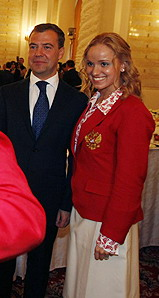

Personal information
- Full name: Anastasiya Nikolayevna Yermakova
- Born: Anastasiya Yermakova; 8 April 1983 (age 43) Moscow, Russian SFSR, Soviet Union
- Height: 1.70 m (5 ft 7 in)
- Weight: 55 kg (121 lb)

Sport
- Sport: Swimming
- Strokes: Synchronized swimming
- Club: CKSA Moscow
- Coach: Tatyana Pokrovskaya
Medal record
| Event | 1st | 2nd | 3rd |
|---|---|---|---|
| Olympic Games | 4 | 0 | 0 |
| World Championships | 8 | 2 | 0 |
| European Championships | 1 | 0 | 0 |
| Total | 13 | 2 | 0 |
Women's synchronised swimming
Representing Russia
Olympic Games
| Gold medal – first place | 2004 Athens | Duet |
| Gold medal – first place | 2004 Athens | Team |
| Gold medal – first place | 2008 Beijing | Duet |
| Gold medal – first place | 2008 Beijing | Team |
World Championships
| Gold medal – first place | 2001 Fukuoka | Team Routine |
| Gold medal – first place | 2003 Barcelona | Duet Routine |
| Gold medal – first place | 2003 Barcelona | Team Routine |
| Gold medal – first place | 2005 Montreal | Duet Routine |
| Gold medal – first place | 2005 Montreal | Combo routine |
| Gold medal – first place | 2007 Melbourne | Duet Technical Routine |
| Gold medal – first place | 2007 Melbourne | Duet Free Routine |
| Gold medal – first place | 2007 Melbourne | Combo Routine |
| Silver medal – second place | 2001 Fukuoka | Duet Routine |
| Silver medal – second place | 2003 Barcelona | Solo Routine |
European Championships
| Gold medal – first place | 2010 Budapest | Combination |

Anastasiya Nikolayevna Yermakova (Russian: Анастасия Николаевна Ермакова, born 8 April 1983 in Moscow) is a Russian competitor in synchronised swimming and four-time Olympic champion.

She won gold medals in the duet competition with Anastasia Davydova at the 2004 Summer Olympics in Athens and 2008 Summer Olympics in Beijing, and was part of the Russian gold medal team in 2004 and 2008.

She trained with the Italian synchronized swimming team "Rarinantes Savona", and collaborated with the Italian national synchronized swimming team. She participated in the Italian program "Vite in Apnea", which was a reality show showing the training of the Italian national team of synchronized swimming, before the swimming world cup Barcelona 2013.
