= Mariya Gromova =

Russian synchronized swimmer

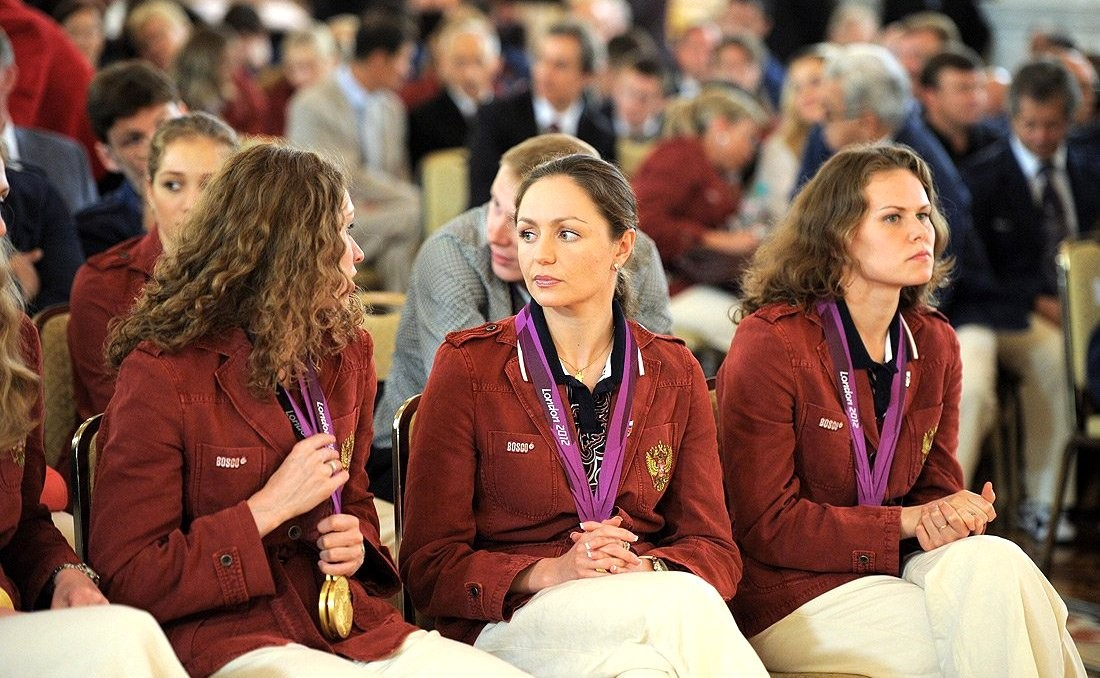
- Natalia Ishchenko, Anastasia Davydova and Gromova

Personal information
- Full name: Mariya Igoryevna Gromova
- Nationality: Russia
- Born: 20 July 1984 (age 41) Moscow, Russian SFSR, Soviet Union
- Height: 1.72 m (5 ft 8 in)
- Weight: 61 kg (134 lb)

Sport
- Sport: Swimming
- Strokes: Synchronized swimming
- Club: Dynamo Moscow
Medal record
Women's synchronized swimming
Representing Russia
Event	1st	2nd	3rd
Olympic Games	3	0	0
World Championships	3	0	0
Total	6	0	0
Olympic Games
Gold medal – first place	2004 Athens	Team Competition
Gold medal – first place	2008 Beijing	Team Competition
Gold medal – first place	2012 London	Team Competition
World Championships
Gold medal – first place	2011 Shanghai	Team technical routine
Gold medal – first place	2011 Shanghai	Free routine combination
Gold medal – first place	2011 Shanghai	Team free routine
- Updated on 25 May 2015

Mariya Igorevna Gromova (Russian: Мария Игоревна Громова) (born 20 July 1984 in Moscow) is a former Russian competitor in synchronized swimming and a triple Olympic champion and now presenter for Channel One.

Mariya was a member of the Russian gold medal team at the 2004, 2008 and 2012 Olympics. She announced her retirement on 1 November 2012 and began working for Channel One on 1 January 2013.
