= 2007 World Aquatics Championships =

12th FINA World Championships

12th FINA World Championships
- Host city: Melbourne, Victoria, Australia
- Date: 17 March – 1 April 2007
- Opened by: Michael Jeffery

The 2007 World Aquatics Championships, or the XII FINA World Championships, were held in Melbourne, Australia from 17 March to 1 April 2007. The competition took place at three locations in central Melbourne: the Melbourne Sports and Aquatic Centre (diving and water polo), St Kilda Beach (open water), and Rod Laver Arena in a temporary pool christened the Susie O'Neill Pool (synchro and swimming).

A total of 2,158 athletes from 167 nations participated in the 2007 championships. The total number of spectators was more than 215,000, setting a new record attendance for the event. FINA President Mustapha Larfaoui described the competition as "the biggest and best in history."

== Medals table ==
* Host nation (Australia)

| Rank | Nation | Gold | Silver | Bronze | Total |
|---|---|---|---|---|---|
| 1 | United States (USA) | 21 | 14 | 5 | 40 |
| 2 | Russia (RUS) | 11 | 6 | 8 | 25 |
| 3 | Australia (AUS)* | 9 | 9 | 8 | 26 |
| 4 | China (CHN) | 9 | 5 | 2 | 16 |
| 5 | France (FRA) | 3 | 2 | 2 | 7 |
| 6 | Germany (GER) | 2 | 5 | 4 | 11 |
| 7 | Poland (POL) | 2 | 1 | 1 | 4 |
| 8 | South Africa (RSA) | 2 | 0 | 1 | 3 |
| 9 | Japan (JPN) | 1 | 4 | 8 | 13 |
| 10 | Canada (CAN) | 1 | 3 | 1 | 5 |
| 11 | Italy (ITA) | 1 | 2 | 6 | 9 |
| 12 | Sweden (SWE) | 1 | 1 | 1 | 3 |
| 13 | South Korea (KOR) | 1 | 0 | 1 | 2 |
| 13 | Ukraine (UKR) | 1 | 0 | 1 | 2 |
| 15 | Croatia (CRO) | 1 | 0 | 0 | 1 |
| 16 | Spain (ESP) | 0 | 4 | 3 | 7 |
| 17 | Great Britain (GBR) | 0 | 2 | 3 | 5 |
| 17 | Netherlands (NED) | 0 | 2 | 3 | 5 |
| 19 | Zimbabwe (ZIM) | 0 | 2 | 0 | 2 |
| 20 | Hungary (HUN) | 0 | 1 | 1 | 2 |
| 21 | Belarus (BLR) | 0 | 1 | 0 | 1 |
| 21 | Switzerland (SUI) | 0 | 1 | 0 | 1 |
| 23 | Austria (AUT) | 0 | 0 | 1 | 1 |
| 23 | Denmark (DEN) | 0 | 0 | 1 | 1 |
| 23 | Egypt (EGY) | 0 | 0 | 1 | 1 |
| 23 | Greece (GRE) | 0 | 0 | 1 | 1 |
| 23 | Venezuela (VEN) | 0 | 0 | 1 | 1 |
| Totals (27 entries) | | 66 | 65 | 64 | 195 |

At the end of the competition, the medals table contained an entry for Tunisia, with one gold and one silver medal, both won by Oussama Mellouli. However, on 11 September 2007, the Court of Arbitration for Sport in Lausanne, Switzerland vacated these results imposing an 18-month competition ban on Mellouli, effective retroactively to 30 October 2006 for doping with amphetamine.

== Competition ==
=== Swimming ===
The Swimming competition comprised various events using all four strokes (Freestyle, Butterfly, Breaststroke and Backstroke) for men and women ranging in distance from 50 m up to 1500 m.

A total of 40 gold medals were available for the Championships. The swimming schedule took place over eight days during the second week of the Championships.

The Swimming events were held at the 15,000-seat Rod Laver Arena using a temporary pool.

=== Open water swimming ===
The open water swimming competition saw men and women competing in events over 5 km, 10 km and 25 km distances. Events were held at St Kilda Beach.

=== Synchronised swimming ===
The synchronised swimming competition featured a solo, a duet, and a team competition. There was also a combination routine, consisting of a mixture of the solo, duet and team routine. Events were held at the 15,000-seat Rod Laver Arena using a temporary pool.

=== Diving ===
The diving competition saw athletes competing for 10 gold medals. Athletes contested the 1 m and 3 m Springboard events, as well as the 10 m Platform as individuals. There were 3 m and 10 m synchronised events for men and women competing as a team. Events were held at the indoor diving pool at the Melbourne Sports and Aquatic Centre.

=== Water polo ===
The water polo competition featured 16 men's teams and 16 women's teams. For each of the two tournaments, a round robin competition took place in four divisions, each with four teams, with the two highest placed teams moving through the medal rounds.

The water polo tournaments were held at the 9,000-seat outdoor pool at the Melbourne Sports and Aquatic Centre, which was constructed for the 2006 Commonwealth Games swimming competition.

The water polo competition also served as the qualifying tournament for the 2008 Summer Olympics in Beijing.

== Bidding process ==
Melbourne was awarded the right to host the 12th FINA World Swimming Championships by the FINA Bureau in Barcelona, Spain on 12 July 2003. Melbourne's bid defeated the bid by Dubai, UAE by a vote of 15 to 6.
