= List of World Aquatics Championships medalists in open water swimming =

This is a list of the medalists of the open water swimming competitions at the World Aquatics Championships. Medalists at the FINA World Open Water Swimming Championships, which have been held as separate events in the even years between 2000 and 2010, have not been included.

== Men ==
Bold numbers in brackets denotes record number of victories in corresponding disciplines.

=== 3 km knockout sprints (2025–present) ===
Event	Gold	Silver	Bronze
2025 Singapore	Florian Wellbrock; Germany	Dávid Betlehem; Hungary	Marc-Antoine Olivier; France

Medal table

Rank	Nation	Gold	Silver	Bronze	Total
1	Germany	1	0	0	1
2	Hungary	0	1	0	1
3	France	0	0	1	1
Totals (3 entries)		1	1	1	3

=== 5 km (1998–present) ===
Event	Gold	Silver	Bronze
1998 Perth	Aleksey Akatyev; Russia	Ky Hurst; Australia	Luca Baldini; Italy
2001 Fukuoka	Luca Baldini; Italy	Yevgeny Bezruchenko; Russia	Marco Formentini; Italy
2003 Barcelona	Evgeny Koshkarov; Russia	Christian Hein; Germany	Vladimir Dyatchin; Russia
2005 Montreal	Thomas Lurz; Germany	Chip Peterson; United States	Simone Ercoli; Italy
2007 Melbourne	Thomas Lurz; Germany	Evgeny Drattsev; Russia	Spyridon Gianniotis; Greece
2009 Rome	Thomas Lurz; Germany	Spyridon Gianniotis; Greece	Chad Ho; South Africa
2011 Shanghai	Thomas Lurz (4); Germany	Spyridon Gianniotis; Greece	Evgeny Drattsev; Russia
2013 Barcelona	Oussama Mellouli; Tunisia	Eric Hedlin; Canada	Thomas Lurz; Germany
2015 Kazan	Chad Ho; South Africa	Rob Muffels; Germany	Matteo Furlan; Italy
2017 Budapest	Marc-Antoine Olivier; France	Mario Sanzullo; Italy	Timothy Shuttleworth; Great Britain
2019 Gwangju	Kristóf Rasovszky; Hungary	Logan Fontaine; France	Eric Hedlin; Canada
2022 Budapest	Florian Wellbrock; Germany	Gregorio Paltrinieri; Italy	Mykhailo Romanchuk; Ukraine
2023 Fukuoka	Florian Wellbrock; Germany	Gregorio Paltrinieri; Italy	Domenico Acerenza; Italy
2024 Doha	Logan Fontaine; France	Marc-Antoine Olivier; France	Domenico Acerenza; Italy
2025 Singapore	Florian Wellbrock; Germany	Gregorio Paltrinieri; Italy	Marc-Antoine Olivier; France

Medal table

Rank	Nation	Gold	Silver	Bronze	Total
1	Germany	7	2	1	10
2	Russia	2	2	2	6
3	France	2	2	1	5
4	Italy	1	4	6	11
5	South Africa	1	0	1	2
6	Hungary	1	0	0	1
6	Tunisia	1	0	0	1
8	Greece	0	2	1	3
9	Canada	0	1	1	2
10	Australia	0	1	0	1
10	United States	0	1	0	1
12	Great Britain	0	0	1	1
12	Ukraine	0	0	1	1
Totals (13 entries)		15	15	15	45

=== 10 km (2001–present) ===
Event	Gold	Silver	Bronze
2001 Fukuoka	Yevgeny Bezruchenko; Russia	Vladimir Dyatchin; Russia	Fabio Venturini; Italy
2003 Barcelona	Vladimir Dyatchin; Russia	Christian Hein; Germany	David Meca; Spain
2005 Montreal	Chip Peterson; United States	Thomas Lurz; Germany	Petar Stoychev; Bulgaria
2007 Melbourne	Vladimir Dyatchin; Russia	Thomas Lurz; Germany	Evgeny Drattsev; Russia
2009 Rome	Thomas Lurz; Germany	Andrew Gemmell; United States	Fran Crippen; United States
2011 Shanghai	Spyridon Gianniotis; Greece	Thomas Lurz; Germany	Sergey Bolshakov; Russia
2013 Barcelona	Spyridon Gianniotis; Greece	Thomas Lurz; Germany	Oussama Mellouli; Tunisia
2015 Kazan	Jordan Wilimovsky; United States	Ferry Weertman; Netherlands	Spyridon Gianniotis; Greece
2017 Budapest	Ferry Weertman; Netherlands	Jordan Wilimovsky; United States	Marc-Antoine Olivier; France
2019 Gwangju	Florian Wellbrock; Germany	Marc-Antoine Olivier; France	Rob Muffels; Germany
2022 Budapest	Gregorio Paltrinieri; Italy	Domenico Acerenza; Italy	Florian Wellbrock; Germany
2023 Fukuoka	Florian Wellbrock; Germany	Kristóf Rasovszky; Hungary	Oliver Klemet; Germany
2024 Doha	Kristóf Rasovszky; Hungary	Marc-Antoine Olivier; France	Hector Pardoe; Great Britain
2025 Singapore	Florian Wellbrock (3); Germany	Gregorio Paltrinieri; Italy	Kyle Lee; Australia

Medal table

Rank	Nation	Gold	Silver	Bronze	Total
1	Germany	4	5	3	12
2	Russia	3	1	2	6
3	United States	2	2	1	5
4	Greece	2	0	1	3
5	Italy	1	2	1	4
6	Hungary	1	1	0	2
6	Netherlands	1	1	0	2
8	France	0	2	1	3
9	Australia	0	0	1	1
9	Bulgaria	0	0	1	1
9	Great Britain	0	0	1	1
9	Spain	0	0	1	1
9	Tunisia	0	0	1	1
Totals (13 entries)		14	14	14	42

=== 25 km (1991–2022) ===
Year	Gold	Silver	Bronze
1991 Perth	Chad Hundeby; United States	Sergio Chariandini; Italy	David O'Brien; Australia
1994 Rome	Greg Streppel; Canada	David Bates; Australia	Aleksey Akatyev; Russia
1998 Perth	Aleksey Akatyev; Russia	David Meca; Spain	Gabriel Chaillou; Argentina
2001 Fukuoka	Yuri Kudinov; Russia	Stéphane Gomez; France	Stéphane Lecat; France
2003 Barcelona	Yuri Kudinov; Russia	David Meca; Spain	Petar Stoychev; Bulgaria
2005 Montreal	David Meca; Spain	Brendan Capell; Australia	Petar Stoychev; Bulgaria
2007 Melbourne	Yuri Kudinov (3); Russia	Marco Formentini; Italy	Mohamed Zanaty; Egypt
2009 Rome	Valerio Cleri; Italy	Trent Grimsey; Australia	Vladimir Dyatchin; Russia
2011 Shanghai	Petar Stoychev; Bulgaria	Vladimir Dyatchin; Russia	Csaba Gercsák; Hungary
2013 Barcelona	Thomas Lurz; Germany	Brian Ryckeman; Belgium	Evgeny Drattsev; Russia
2015 Kazan	Simone Ruffini; Italy	Alex Meyer; United States	Matteo Furlan; Italy
2017 Budapest	Axel Reymond; France	Matteo Furlan; Italy	Evgeny Drattsev; Russia
2019 Gwangju	Axel Reymond; France	Kirill Belyaev; Russia	Alessio Occhipinti; Italy
2022 Budapest	Dario Verani; Italy	Axel Reymond; France	Péter Gálicz; Hungary

Medal table

Rank	Nation	Gold	Silver	Bronze	Total
1	Russia	4	2	4	10
2	Italy	3	3	2	8
3	France	2	2	1	5
4	Spain	1	2	0	3
5	United States	1	1	0	2
6	Bulgaria	1	0	2	3
7	Canada	1	0	0	1
7	Germany	1	0	0	1
9	Australia	0	3	1	4
10	Belgium	0	1	0	1
11	Hungary	0	0	2	2
12	Argentina	0	0	1	1
12	Egypt	0	0	1	1
Totals (13 entries)		14	14	14	42

== Women ==
Bold numbers in brackets denotes record number of victories in corresponding disciplines.

=== 3 km knockout sprints (2025–present) ===
Event	Gold	Silver	Bronze
2025 Singapore	Ichika Kajimoto; Japan	Ginevra Taddeucci; Italy	Bettina Fábián; Hungary; Moesha Johnson; Australia

Medal table

Rank	Nation	Gold	Silver	Bronze	Total
1	Japan	1	0	0	1
2	Italy	0	1	0	1
3	Australia	0	0	1	1
3	Hungary	0	0	1	1
Totals (4 entries)		1	1	2	4

=== 5 km (1998–present) ===
Event	Gold	Silver	Bronze
1998 Perth	Erica Rose; United States	Edith van Dijk; Netherlands	Peggy Büchse; Germany
2001 Fukuoka	Viola Valli; Italy	Peggy Büchse; Germany	Hayley Lewis; Australia
2003 Barcelona	Viola Valli (2); Italy	Jana Pechanová; Czech Republic	Britta Kamrau; Germany
2005 Montreal	Larisa Ilchenko; Russia	Margy Keefe; United States	Edith van Dijk; Netherlands
2007 Melbourne	Larisa Ilchenko (2); Russia	Ekaterina Seliverstova; Russia	Kate Brookes-Peterson; Australia
2009 Rome	Melissa Gorman; Australia	Larisa Ilchenko; Russia	Poliana Okimoto; Brazil
2011 Shanghai	Swann Oberson; Switzerland	Aurélie Muller; France	Ashley Twichell; United States
2013 Barcelona	Haley Anderson; United States	Poliana Okimoto; Brazil	Ana Marcela Cunha; Brazil
2015 Kazan	Haley Anderson (2); United States	Kalliopi Araouzou; Greece	Finnia Wunram; Germany
2017 Budapest	Ashley Twichell; United States	Aurélie Muller; France	Ana Marcela Cunha; Brazil
2019 Gwangju	Ana Marcela Cunha; Brazil	Aurélie Muller; France	Leonie Beck; Germany; Hannah Moore; United States
2022 Budapest	Ana Marcela Cunha (2); Brazil	Aurélie Muller; France	Giulia Gabbrielleschi; Italy
2023 Fukuoka	Leonie Beck; Germany	Sharon van Rouwendaal; Netherlands	Ana Marcela Cunha; Brazil
2024 Doha	Sharon van Rouwendaal; Netherlands	Chelsea Gubecka; Australia	Ana Marcela Cunha; Brazil
2025 Singapore	Moesha Johnson; Australia	Ginevra Taddeucci; Italy	Ichika Kajimoto; Japan

Medal table

Rank	Nation	Gold	Silver	Bronze	Total
1	United States	4	1	2	7
2	Russia	2	2	0	4
3	Brazil	2	1	5	8
4	Australia	2	1	2	5
5	Italy	2	1	1	4
6	Netherlands	1	2	1	4
7	Germany	1	1	4	6
8	Switzerland	1	0	0	1
9	France	0	4	0	4
10	Czech Republic	0	1	0	1
10	Greece	0	1	0	1
12	Japan	0	0	1	1
Totals (12 entries)		15	15	16	46

=== 10 km (2001–present) ===
Event	Gold	Silver	Bronze
2001 Fukuoka	Peggy Büchse; Germany	Irina Abysova; Russia	Edith van Dijk; Netherlands
2003 Barcelona	Viola Valli; Italy	Angela Maurer; Germany	Edith van Dijk; Netherlands
2005 Montreal	Edith van Dijk; Netherlands	Federica Vitale; Italy	Britta Kamrau; Germany
2007 Melbourne	Larisa Ilchenko; Russia	Cassandra Patten; Great Britain	Kate Brookes-Peterson; Australia
2009 Rome	Keri-Anne Payne; Great Britain	Ekatarina Seliverstova; Russia	Martina Grimaldi; Italy
2011 Shanghai	Keri-Anne Payne (2); Great Britain	Martina Grimaldi; Italy	Marianna Lymperta; Greece
2013 Barcelona	Poliana Okimoto; Brazil	Ana Marcela Cunha; Brazil	Angela Maurer; Germany
2015 Kazan	Aurélie Muller; France	Sharon van Rouwendaal; Netherlands	Ana Marcela Cunha; Brazil
2017 Budapest	Aurélie Muller (2); France	Samantha Arévalo; Ecuador	Arianna Bridi; Italy; Ana Marcela Cunha; Brazil
2019 Gwangju	Xin Xin; China	Haley Anderson; United States	Rachele Bruni; Italy
2022 Budapest	Sharon van Rouwendaal; Netherlands	Leonie Beck; Germany	Ana Marcela Cunha; Brazil
2023 Fukuoka	Leonie Beck; Germany	Chelsea Gubecka; Australia	Katie Grimes; United States
2024 Doha	Sharon van Rouwendaal (2); Netherlands	María de Valdés; Spain	Angélica André; Portugal
2025 Singapore	Moesha Johnson; Australia	Ginevra Taddeucci; Italy	Lisa Pou; Monaco

Medal table

Rank	Nation	Gold	Silver	Bronze	Total
1	Netherlands	3	1	2	6
2	Germany	2	2	2	6
3	Great Britain	2	1	0	3
4	France	2	0	0	2
5	Italy	1	3	3	7
6	Russia	1	2	0	3
7	Brazil	1	1	3	5
8	Australia	1	1	1	3
9	China	1	0	0	1
10	United States	0	1	1	2
11	Ecuador	0	1	0	1
11	Spain	0	1	0	1
13	Greece	0	0	1	1
13	Monaco	0	0	1	1
13	Portugal	0	0	1	1
Totals (15 entries)		14	14	15	43

=== 25 km (1991–2022) ===
Event	Gold	Silver	Bronze
1991 Perth	Shelley Taylor-Smith; Australia	Martha Jahn; United States	Karen Burton; United States
1994 Rome	Melissa Cunningham; Australia	Rita Kovács; Hungary	Shelley Taylor-Smith; Australia
1998 Perth	Tobie Smith; United States	Peggy Büchse; Germany	Edith van Dijk; Netherlands
2001 Fukuoka	Viola Valli; Italy	Edith van Dijk; Netherlands	Angela Maurer; Germany
2003 Barcelona	Edith van Dijk; Netherlands	Britta Kamrau; Germany	Angela Maurer; Germany
2005 Montreal	Edith van Dijk; Netherlands	Britta Kamrau; Germany	Laura la Piana; Italy
2007 Melbourne	Britta Kamrau-Corestein; Germany	Kalyn Keller; United States	Ksenia Popova; Russia
2009 Rome	Angela Maurer; Germany	Anna Uvarova; Russia	Federica Vitale; Italy
2011 Shanghai	Ana Marcela Cunha; Brazil	Angela Maurer; Germany	Alice Franco; Italy
2013 Barcelona	Martina Grimaldi; Italy	Angela Maurer; Germany	Eva Fabian; United States
2015 Kazan	Ana Marcela Cunha; Brazil	Anna Olasz; Hungary	Angela Maurer; Germany
2017 Budapest	Ana Marcela Cunha; Brazil	Sharon van Rouwendaal; Netherlands	Arianna Bridi; Italy
2019 Gwangju	Ana Marcela Cunha; Brazil	Finnia Wunram; Germany	Lara Grangeon; France
2022 Budapest	Ana Marcela Cunha (5); Brazil	Lea Boy; Germany	Sharon van Rouwendaal; Netherlands

Medal table

Rank	Nation	Gold	Silver	Bronze	Total
1	Brazil	5	0	0	5
2	Germany	2	7	3	12
3	Netherlands	2	2	2	6
4	Italy	2	0	4	6
5	Australia	2	0	1	3
6	United States	1	2	2	5
7	Hungary	0	2	0	2
8	Russia	0	1	1	2
9	France	0	0	1	1
Totals (9 entries)		14	14	14	42

== Mixed team ==
Bold numbers in brackets denotes record number of victories in corresponding disciplines.

=== 5 km (1998–2019), 6 km (2022–present) ===
Event	Gold	Silver	Bronze
1998 Perth	United States; John Flanagan; Austin Ramirez; Erica Rose	Russia; Aleksey Akatyev; Yevgeny Bezruchenko; Olga Gouseva	Italy; Luca Baldini; Fabio Venturini; Valeria Casprini
2011 Shanghai	United States; Andrew Gemmell; Ashley Twichell; Sean Ryan	Australia; Melissa Gorman; Ky Hurst; Rhys Mainstone	Germany; Isabelle Härle; Thomas Lurz; Jan Wolfgarten
2013 Barcelona	Germany; Thomas Lurz; Christian Reichert; Isabelle Härle	Greece; Adonios Fokaidis; Spyridon Gianniotis; Kalliopi Araouzou	Brazil; Allan do Carmo; Samuel de Bona; Poliana Okimoto
2015 Kazan	Germany; Rob Muffels; Christian Reichert (2); Isabelle Härle (2)	Brazil; Allan do Carmo; Diogo Villarinho; Ana Marcela Cunha; Netherlands; Marcel Schouten; Ferry Weertman; Sharon van Rouwendaal	Not awarded
2017 Budapest	France; Oceane Cassignol; Logan Fontaine; Aurélie Muller; Marc-Antoine Olivier	United States; Brendan Casey; Ashley Twichell; Haley Anderson; Jordan Wilimovsky	Italy; Rachele Bruni; Giulia Gabbrielleschi; Federico Vanelli; Mario Sanzullo
2019 Gwangju	Germany; Lea Boy; Sarah Köhler; Sören Meißner; Rob Muffels (2)	Italy; Rachele Bruni; Giulia Gabbrielleschi; Domenico Acerenza; Gregorio Paltrinieri	United States; Haley Anderson; Jordan Wilimovsky; Ashley Twichell; Michael Brinegar
2022 Budapest	Germany; Lea Boy (2); Oliver Klemet; Leonie Beck; Florian Wellbrock	Hungary; Réka Rohács; Anna Olasz; Dávid Betlehem; Kristóf Rasovszky	Italy; Ginevra Taddeucci; Giulia Gabbrielleschi; Domenico Acerenza; Gregorio Paltrinieri
2023 Fukuoka	Italy; Barbara Pozzobon; Ginevra Taddeucci; Domenico Acerenza; Gregorio Paltrinieri	Hungary; Bettina Fábián; Anna Olasz; Kristóf Rasovszky; Dávid Betlehem	Australia; Chelsea Gubecka; Moesha Johnson; Nicholas Sloman; Kyle Lee
2024 Doha	Australia; Moesha Johnson; Chelsea Gubecka; Nicholas Sloman; Kyle Lee	Italy; Giulia Gabbrielleschi; Arianna Bridi; Gregorio Paltrinieri; Domenico Acerenza	Hungary; Bettina Fábián; Mira Szimcsák; Dávid Betlehem; Kristóf Rasovszky
2025 Singapore	Germany; Celine Rieder; Oliver Klemet (2); Isabel Gose; Florian Wellbrock (2)	Italy; Barbara Pozzobon; Ginevra Taddeucci; Marcello Guidi; Gregorio Paltrinieri	Hungary; Bettina Fábián; Viktória Mihályvári-Farkas; Kristóf Rasovszky; Dávid Betlehem

Medal table

Rank	Nation	Gold	Silver	Bronze	Total
1	Germany	5	0	1	6
2	United States	2	1	1	4
3	Italy	1	3	3	7
4	Australia	1	1	1	3
5	France	1	0	0	1
6	Hungary	0	2	2	4
7	Brazil	0	1	1	2
8	Greece	0	1	0	1
8	Netherlands	0	1	0	1
8	Russia	0	1	0	1
Totals (10 entries)		10	11	9	30

=== 25 km (1998) ===
Event	Gold	Silver	Bronze
1998 Perth	Italy; Claudio Gargaro; Fabrizio Pescatori; Valeria Casprini	Australia; Grant Robinson; Mark Saliba; Tracey Knowles	United States; Tobie Smith; Nathan Stooke; Chuck Wiley

Medal table

Rank	Nation	Gold	Silver	Bronze	Total
1	Italy	1	0	0	1
2	Australia	0	1	0	1
3	United States	0	0	1	1
Totals (3 entries)		1	1	1	3

== All-time medal table 1991–2025 ==
Updated the 2025 World Aquatics Championships.

Rank	Nation	Gold	Silver	Bronze	Total
1	Germany	23	17	14	54
2	Italy	12	17	20	49
3	Russia	12	11	9	32
4	United States	10	9	8	27
5	Brazil	8	3	9	20
6	France	7	10	5	22
7	Netherlands	7	7	5	19
8	Australia	6	8	8	22
9	Hungary	2	6	5	13
10	Greece	2	4	3	9
11	Great Britain	2	1	2	5
12	Spain	1	3	1	5
13	Canada	1	1	1	3
14	Bulgaria	1	0	3	4
15	Japan	1	0	1	2
15	South Africa	1	0	1	2
15	Tunisia	1	0	1	2
18	China	1	0	0	1
18	Switzerland	1	0	0	1
20	Belgium	0	1	0	1
20	Czech Republic	0	1	0	1
20	Ecuador	0	1	0	1
23	Argentina	0	0	1	1
23	Egypt	0	0	1	1
23	Monaco	0	0	1	1
23	Portugal	0	0	1	1
23	Ukraine	0	0	1	1
Totals (27 entries)		99	100	101	300

== Multiple medalists ==
Boldface denotes active swimmers and highest medal count among all swimmers (including these who not included in these tables) per type.

=== Men ===
Rank	Swimmer	Country	From	To	Gold	Silver	Bronze	Total
1	**Florian Wellbrock**	Germany	2019	2025	**9**	–	1	10
2	Thomas Lurz	Germany	2005	2013	7	4	2	**13**
3	Yuri Kudinov	Russia	2001	2007	3	–	–	3
4	**Gregorio Paltrinieri**	Italy	2019	2025	2	**7**	1	10
5	**Marc-Antoine Olivier**	France	2017	2025	2	3	3	8
6	Spyridon Gianniotis	Greece	2007	2015	2	3	2	7
6	**Kristóf Rasovszky**	Hungary	2019	2025	2	3	2	7
8	Vladimir Dyatchin	Russia	2001	2011	2	2	2	6
9	Aleksey Akatyev	Russia	1994	1998	2	1	1	4
9	**Rob Muffels**	Germany	2015	2019	2	1	1	4

=== Men (including medals won in 2000–2010) ===
This table includes medals won at the separate FINA World Open Water Swimming Championships in 2000–2010.

Rank	Swimmer	Country	From	To	Gold	Silver	Bronze	Total
1	Thomas Lurz	Germany	2002	2013	**12**	4	4	**20**
2	**Florian Wellbrock**	Germany	2019	2025	9	–	1	10
3	Yuri Kudinov	Russia	2000	2008	5	2	1	8
4	Vladimir Dyatchin	Russia	2001	2011	3	3	4	10
5	**Gregorio Paltrinieri**	Italy	2019	2025	2	**7**	1	10
6	David Meca	Spain	1998	2005	2	4	1	7
7	**Marc-Antoine Olivier**	France	2017	2025	2	3	3	8
8	Spyridon Gianniotis	Greece	2007	2015	2	3	2	7
8	**Kristóf Rasovszky**	Hungary	2019	2025	2	3	2	7
10	Yevgeny Bezruchenko	Russia	1998	2001	2	2	1	5

=== Women ===
Rank	Swimmer	Country	From	To	Gold	Silver	Bronze	Total
1	**Ana Marcela Cunha**	Brazil	2011	2024	**7**	2	**7**	**16**
2	Viola Valli	Italy	2001	2003	4	–	–	4
3	Sharon van Rouwendaal	Netherlands	2015	2024	3	**4**	1	8
4	Aurélie Muller	France	2011	2022	3	**4**	–	7
5	Edith van Dijk	Netherlands	1998	2005	3	2	4	9
6	Leonie Beck	Germany	2019	2023	3	1	1	5
7	Larisa Ilchenko	Russia	2005	2009	3	1	–	4
8	**Moesha Johnson**	Australia	2023	2025	3	–	2	5
9	Haley Anderson	United States	2013	2019	2	2	1	5
10	**Ashley Twichell**	United States	2011	2019	2	1	2	5

=== Women (including medals won in 2000–2010) ===
This table includes medals won at the separate FINA World Open Water Swimming Championships in 2000–2010.

Rank	Swimmer	Country	From	To	Gold	Silver	Bronze	Total
1	Larisa Ilchenko	Russia	2004	2009	**8**	1	–	9
2	**Ana Marcela Cunha**	Brazil	2010	2023	7	2	**8**	**17**
3	Edith van Dijk	Netherlands	1998	2008	6	**5**	4	15
4	Viola Valli	Italy	2000	2003	5	2	1	8
5	Britta Kamrau-Corestein	Germany	2002	2007	4	2	4	10
6	Sharon van Rouwendaal	Netherlands	2015	2024	3	4	1	8
7	Aurélie Muller	France	2011	2022	3	4	–	7
8	Leonie Beck	Germany	2019	2023	3	1	1	5
9	**Moesha Johnson**	Australia	2023	2025	3	–	2	5
10	Angela Maurer	Germany	2000	2015	2	4	6	12

== See also ==
- FINA World Open Water Swimming Championships
- List of World Aquatics Championships medalists in swimming (men)
- List of World Aquatics Championships medalists in swimming (women)
