= List of European Aquatics Championships medalists in open water swimming =

This is the complete list of LEN European Aquatics Championships medalists in open water swimming since 1995, when the championships were part of the European Aquatics Championships (10 times of 18 total).

European Open Water Swimming Championships was seven-time stand alone championship (1989, 1991, 1993, 2008, 2011, 2012, 2016) and eleven-time part of the European Aquatics Championships (1995, 1997, 1999, 2000, 2002, 2004, 2006, 2010, 2014, 2018, 2022).

== Men ==
=== 5 km ===
Year	Gold	Silver	Bronze
1995 Vienna	Aleksey Akatyev (RUS)	Christof Wandratsch (GER)	Samuele Pampana (ITA)
1997 Seville	Aleksey Akatyev (RUS)	Yevgeny Bezruchenko (RUS)	Luca Baldini (ITA)
1999 Istanbul	Yevgeny Bezruchenko (RUS)	Aleksey Akatyev (RUS)	Samuele Pampana (ITA)
2000 Helsinki	Luca Baldini (ITA)	Fabio Venturini (ITA)	David Meca (ESP)
2002 Berlin	Luca Baldini (ITA)	Thomas Lurz (GER)	Stefano Rubaudo (ITA)
2004 Madrid	Fabio Venturini (ITA)	Alan Bircher (GBR)	Stefano Rubaudo (ITA)
2006 Budapest	Thomas Lurz (GER)	Christian Hein (GER)	Simone Ercoli (ITA)
2010 Budapest	Luca Ferretti (ITA)	Simone Ercoli (ITA)	Simone Ruffini (ITA)
2010 Budapest	Luca Ferretti (ITA)	Simone Ercoli (ITA)	Spyridon Gianniotis (GRE)
2014 Berlin	Daniel Fogg (GBR)	Rob Muffels (GER)	Thomas Lurz (GER)
2018 Glasgow	Kristóf Rasovszky (HUN)	Axel Reymond (FRA)	Logan Fontaine (FRA)
2020 Budapest	Gregorio Paltrinieri (ITA)	Marc-Antoine Olivier (FRA)	Dario Verani (ITA)
2022 Rome	Gregorio Paltrinieri (ITA)	Domenico Acerenza (ITA)	Marc-Antoine Olivier (FRA)
2024 Belgrade	Dávid Betlehem (HUN)	Marc-Antoine Olivier (FRA)	Marcello Guidi (ITA)
2026 Paris	Florian Wellbrock (GER)	Dávid Betlehem (HUN)	Gregorio Paltrinieri (ITA)

=== 10 km ===
Year	Gold	Silver	Bronze
2002 Berlin	Vladimir Dyatchin (RUS)	Yevgeniy Kochkarov (RUS)	Luca Baldini (ITA)
2004 Madrid	Yevgeniy Kochkarov (RUS)	Massimiliano Parla (ITA)	Anton Sanachev (RUS)
2006 Budapest	Thomas Lurz (GER)	Maarten van der Weijden (NED)	Christian Hein (GER)
2010 Budapest	Thomas Lurz (GER)	Valerio Cleri (ITA)	Evgeny Drattsev (RUS)
2014 Berlin	Ferry Weertman (NED)	Thomas Lurz (GER)	Evgeny Drattsev (RUS)
2018 Glasgow	Ferry Weertman (NED)	Kristóf Rasovszky (HUN)	Rob Muffels (GER)
2020 Budapest	Gregorio Paltrinieri (ITA)	Marc-Antoine Olivier (FRA)	Florian Wellbrock (GER)
2022 Rome	Domenico Acerenza (ITA)	Marc-Antoine Olivier (FRA)	Logan Fontaine (FRA)
2024 Belgrade	Gregorio Paltrinieri (ITA)	Marc-Antoine Olivier (FRA)	Dávid Betlehem (HUN)
2026 Paris	Florian Wellbrock (GER)	Dávid Betlehem (HUN)	Oliver Klemet (GER)

=== 25 km ===
Year	Gold	Silver	Bronze
1995 Vienna	Christof Wandratsch (GER)	Aleksey Akatyev (RUS)	Stéphane Lecat (FRA)
1997 Seville	Aleksey Akatyev (RUS)	Christof Wandratsch (GER); Stéphane Lecat (FRA)	
1999 Istanbul	Aleksey Akatyev (RUS)	Anton Sanachev (RUS)	André Wilde (GER)
2000 Helsinki	Stéphane Lecat (FRA)	David Meca (ESP)	Fabio Fusi (ITA)
2002 Berlin	Yuri Kudinov (RUS)	Gilles Rondy (FRA)	David Meca (ESP)
2004 Madrid	Yevgeniy Kochkarov (RUS)	David Meca (ESP)	Petar Stoychev (BUL)
2006 Budapest	Gilles Rondy (FRA)	Anton Sanachev (RUS)	Stéphane Gomez (FRA)
2010 Budapest	Valerio Cleri (ITA)	Bertrand Venturi (FRA)	Joanes Hedel (FRA)
2014 Berlin	Axel Reymond (FRA)	Evgeny Drattsev (RUS)	Edoardo Stochino (ITA)
2018 Glasgow	Kristóf Rasovszky (HUN)	Kirill Belyaev (RUS)	Matteo Furlan (ITA)
2020 Budapest	Axel Reymond (FRA)	Matteo Furlan (ITA)	Kirill Abrosimov (RUS)
2022 Rome	Mario Sanzullo (ITA)	Dario Verani (ITA)	Matteo Furlan (ITA)
2024 Belgrade	Dario Verani (ITA)	Matteo Furlan (ITA)	Axel Reymond (FRA)

== Women ==
=== 5 km ===
Year	Gold	Silver	Bronze
1995 Vienna	Rita Kovács (HUN)	Peggy Büchse (GER)	Valeria Casprini (ITA)
1997 Seville	Peggy Büchse (GER)	Valeria Casprini (ITA)	Rita Kovács (HUN)
1999 Istanbul	Peggy Büchse (GER)	Viola Valli (ITA)	Britta Kamrau (GER)
2000 Helsinki	Peggy Büchse (GER)	Britta Kamrau (GER)	Jana Pechanová (CZE)
2002 Berlin	Viola Valli (ITA)	Hanna Miluska (SUI)	Nadine Pastor (GER)
2004 Madrid	Britta Kamrau (GER)	Stefanie Biller (GER)	Xenia López (ESP)
2006 Budapest	Ekaterina Seliverstova (RUS)	Cathi Dietrich (FRA)	Jana Pechanová (CZE)
2006 Budapest	Ekaterina Seliverstova (RUS)	Cathi Dietrich (FRA)	Larisa Ilchenko (RUS)
2010 Budapest	Ekaterina Seliverstova (RUS)	Kalliopi Araouzou (GRE)	Marianna Lymperta (GRE)
2014 Berlin	Isabelle Härle (GER)	Sharon van Rouwendaal (NED)	Mireia Belmonte (ESP)
2018 Glasgow	Sharon van Rouwendaal (NED)	Leonie Beck (GER)	Rachele Bruni (ITA)
2020 Budapest	Sharon van Rouwendaal (NED)	Giulia Gabbrielleschi (ITA)	Océane Cassignol (FRA)
2022 Rome	Sharon van Rouwendaal (NED)	María de Valdés (ESP)	Giulia Gabbrielleschi (ITA)
2024 Belgrade	Leonie Beck (GER)	Ginevra Taddeucci (ITA)	Bettina Fábián (HUN)
2026 Paris	Ginevra Taddeucci (ITA)	Viktória Mihályvári-Farkas (HUN)	Barbara Pozzobon (ITA)

=== 10 km ===
Year	Gold	Silver	Bronze
2002 Berlin	Edith van Dijk (NED)	Angela Maurer (GER)	Britta Kamrau (GER)
2004 Madrid	Britta Kamrau (GER)	Marta Nogues (ESP)	Angela Maurer (GER)
2006 Budapest	Angela Maurer (GER)	Rita Kovács (HUN)	Jana Pechanová (CZE)
2010 Budapest	Linsy Heister (NED)	Giorgia Consiglio (ITA)	Angela Maurer (GER)
2014 Berlin	Sharon van Rouwendaal (NED)	Éva Risztov (HUN)	Aurora Ponselè (ITA)
2018 Glasgow	Sharon van Rouwendaal (NED)	Giulia Gabbrielleschi (ITA)	Esmee Vermeulen (NED)
2020 Budapest	Sharon van Rouwendaal (NED)	Anna Olasz (HUN)	Rachele Bruni (ITA)
2022 Rome	Leonie Beck (GER)	Ginevra Taddeucci (ITA)	Angélica André (POR)
2024 Belgrade	Leonie Beck (GER)	Barbara Pozzobon (ITA)	Giulia Gabbrielleschi (ITA)
2026 Paris	Ginevra Taddeucci (ITA)	Viktória Mihályvári-Farkas (HUN)	Linda Caponi (ITA)

=== 25 km ===
Year	Gold	Silver	Bronze
1995 Vienna	Peggy Büchse (GER)	Edith van Dijk (NED)	Yvetta Hlaváčová (CZE)
1997 Seville	Rita Kovács (HUN)	Valeria Casprini (ITA)	Edith van Dijk (NED)
1999 Istanbul	Olga Gusseva (RUS)	Angela Maurer (GER)	Britta Kamrau (GER)
2000 Helsinki	Peggy Büchse (GER)	Edith van Dijk (NED)	Valeria Casprini (ITA)
2002 Berlin	Edith van Dijk (NED)	Olesiya Shalygina (RUS)	Natalia Pankina (RUS)
2004 Madrid	Britta Kamrau (GER)	Natalia Pankina (RUS)	Ivanka Moralieva (BUL)
2006 Budapest	Angela Maurer (GER)	Natalia Pankina (RUS)	Stefanie Biller (GER)
2010 Budapest	Olga Beresnyeva (UKR)	Angela Maurer (GER)	Martina Grimaldi (ITA)
2014 Berlin	Martina Grimaldi (ITA)	Anna Olasz (HUN)	Angela Maurer (GER)
2018 Glasgow	Arianna Bridi (ITA)	Sharon van Rouwendaal (NED)	Lara Grangeon (FRA)
2020 Budapest	Lea Boy (GER)	Lara Grangeon (FRA)	Barbara Pozzobon (ITA)
2022 Rome	Caroline Jouisse (FRA)	Barbara Pozzobon (ITA)	Veronica Santoni (ITA)
2024 Belgrade	Barbara Pozzobon (ITA)	Lea Boy (GER)	Candela Sánchez (ESP)

== Mixed team ==
=== 5 km ===
Year	Gold	Silver	Bronze
2010 Budapest	Greece; Kalliopi Araouzou; Antonios Fokaidis; Spyridon Gianniotis	Italy; Rachele Bruni; Simone Ercoli; Simone Ruffini	Russia; Sergey Bolshakov; Anna Guseva; Daniil Serebrennikov
2014 Berlin	Netherlands; Ferry Weertman; Marcel Schouten; Sharon van Rouwendaal	Greece; Spyridon Gianniotis; Antonios Fokaidis; Kalliopi Araouzou	Germany; Rob Muffels; Thomas Lurz; Isabelle Härle
2016 Hoorn	Italy; Rachele Bruni; Simone Ruffini; Federico Vanelli	Germany; Finnia Wunram; Rob Muffels; Andreas Waschburger	Hungary; Éva Risztov; Márk Papp; Dániel Székelyi
2018 Glasgow	Netherlands; Esmee Vermeulen; Sharon van Rouwendaal; Pepijn Smits; Ferry Weertman	Germany; Leonie Beck; Sarah Köhler; Sören Meißner; Florian Wellbrock	France; Lara Grangeon; David Aubry; Lisa Pou; Marc-Antoine Olivier
2020 Budapest	Italy; Rachele Bruni; Giulia Gabbrielleschi; Gregorio Paltrinieri; Domenico Acerenza	Germany; Lea Boy; Leonie Beck; Rob Muffels; Florian Wellbrock	Hungary; Réka Rohács; Anna Olasz; Dávid Betlehem; Kristóf Rasovszky
2022 Rome	Italy; Rachele Bruni; Ginevra Taddeucci; Gregorio Paltrinieri; Domenico Acerenza	Hungary; Réka Rohács; Anna Olasz; Dávid Betlehem; Kristóf Rasovszky	France; Madelon Catteau; Aurélie Muller; Axel Reymond; Logan Fontaine
2024 Belgrade	Hungary; Mira Szimcsák; Bettina Fábián; Dávid Betlehem; Kristóf Rasovszky	Italy; Giulia Gabbrielleschi; Ginevra Taddeucci; Andrea Filadelli; Marcello Guidi	France; Caroline Jouisse; Océane Cassignol; Sacha Velly; Marc-Antoine Olivier
2026 Paris	Germany; Julia Ackermann; Isabel Gose; Oliver Klemet; Florian Wellbrock	Italy; Barbara Pozzobon; Ginevra Taddeucci; Marcello Guidi; Gregorio Paltrinieri	Hungary; Bettina Fábián; Viktória Mihályvári-Farkas; Dávid Betlehem; Kristóf Rasovszky

== See also ==
- List of medalists at the European Open Water Swimming Championships
- List of European Aquatics Championships medalists in swimming (men)
- List of European Aquatics Championships medalists in swimming (women)
