= FINA World Open Water Swimming Championships =

Bi-annual FINA championship for open water swimming

The FINA World Open Water Swimming Championships, or more commonly "Open Water Worlds", was a bi-annual FINA (now World Aquatics) championship for open water swimming held in even years from 2000 to 2010, inclusive. Race distances were 5, 10, and 25 kilometers (also known as 5K, 10K, and 25K).

The 10 km race at the 2008 edition served as the main qualifying event for the 2008 Olympics 10 km event.

== Editions ==
Twelve editions were part of the World Aquatics Championships and six edition were held stand alone editions. Starting in 2011, the biannual event was merged to the World Aquatics Championships.

stand alone edition

Edition	Year	Venue	Country	Events
1st	1991	Perth	Australia	2
2nd	1994	Rome	Italy	2
3d	1998	Perth	Australia	6
4h	2000	Honolulu	United States	9
5th	2001	Fukuoka	Japan	6
6th	2002	Sharm El Sheikh	Egypt	9
7th	2003	Barcelona	Spain	6
8th	2004	Dubai	United Arab Emirates	9
9th	2005	Montreal	Canada	6
10th	2006	Naples	Italy	6
11th	2007	Melbourne	Australia	6
12th	2008	Sevilla	Spain	6
13th	2009	Rome	Italy	6
14th	2010	Roberval	Canada	6
15th	2011	Shanghai	China	7
16th	2013	Barcelona	Spain	7
17th	2015	Kazan	Russia	7
18th	2017	Budapest	Hungary	7
19th	2019	Gwangju	South Korea	7
20th	2022	Budapest	Hungary	7
21st	2023	Fukuoka	Japan	5
22nd	2024	Doha	Qatar	5
				120

== Stand alone editions ==
Starting in 2000, the FINA Open Water World Championships were held in the years between the World Aquatics Championships, providing an annual championships for Open Water Swimming. At its January 2010 meeting, the FINA Bureau decided to replace this event with a junior (18 and under) championships, making the 2010 Open Water Worlds the last edition of these championships, and 2012 seeing the first of a Junior Open Water Worlds.

Year	Edition	Location	Events	Distances competed	Winner of the medal table	Second in the medal table	Third in the medal table
2000	1	(United States) Honolulu, USA	3 (m), 3 (w), 2 (mixed)	5 km, 10 km, 25 km	Russia	Germany	Netherlands
2002	2	Sharm el-Sheikh, Egypt	3 (m), 3 (w), 2 (mixed)	5 km, 10 km, 25 km	Italy	Germany	Russia
2004	3	(United Arab Emirates) Dubai, UAE	3 (m), 3 (w), 2 (mixed)	5 km, 10 km, 25 km	Germany	Australia	Russia
2006	4	Naples, Italy	3 (m), 3 (w)	5 km, 10 km, 25 km	Germany	Russia	Australia
2008	5	Seville, Spain	3 (m), 3 (w)	5 km, 10 km, 25 km	Russia	Netherlands	Germany
2010	6	Roberval, Canada	3 (m), 3 (w)	5 km, 10 km, 25 km	Italy	United States	Germany; Netherlands

== Events ==
Below is a table of the events held at each year of the competition.

Edition		1991	1994	1998	2001	2003	2005	2007	2009	2011	2013	2015	2017	2019	2022	2023	2024
Men	5 km			X	X	X	X	X	X	X	X	X	X	X	X	X	X
Men	10 km				X	X	X	X	X	X	X	X	X	X	X	X	X
Men	25 km	X	X	X	X	X	X	X	X	X	X	X	X	X	X		
Women	5 km			X	X	X	X	X	X	X	X	X	X	X	X	X	X
Women	10 km				X	X	X	X	X	X	X	X	X	X	X	X	X
Women	25 km	X	X	X	X	X	X	X	X	X	X	X	X	X	X		
Mixed	5/6 km			X						X	X	X	X	X	X	X	X
Mixed	25 km			X													
Number of events		2	2	6	6	6	6	6	6	7	7	7	7	7	7	5	5

== All-time medal table ==
Rank	Nation	Gold	Silver	Bronze	Total
1	Germany	33	25	25	83
2	Russia	28	23	23	74
3	Italy	20	21	22	63
4	United States	11	10	11	32
5	Netherlands	9	9	6	24
6	Brazil	8	5	10	23
7	France	7	10	5	22
8	Australia	7	7	10	24
9	Spain	2	7	5	14
10	Hungary	2	5	3	10
11	Greece	2	4	3	9
12	Great Britain	2	4	2	8
13	Bulgaria	1	1	4	6
14	Canada	1	1	1	3
15	Switzerland	1	0	2	3
16	South Africa	1	0	1	2
16	Tunisia	1	0	1	2
18	China	1	0	0	1
19	Czech Republic	0	2	0	2
20	Belgium	0	1	0	1
20	Ecuador	0	1	0	1
22	Argentina	0	0	2	2
23	Egypt	0	0	1	1
23	Portugal	0	0	1	1
23	Ukraine	0	0	1	1
Totals (25 entries)		137	136	139	412

== Multiple medalists ==
The best swimmers:

=== Men ===
#	Swimmer	1st place, gold medalist(s)	2nd place, silver medalist(s)	3rd place, bronze medalist(s)	Total
1	(Germany) Thomas Lurz	12	4	4	20
2	(Russia) Yuri Koudinov	5	2	1	8
3	(Russia) Vladimir Dyatchin	3	3	4	10
4	(Spain) David Meca	2	4	1	7
5	(Greece) Spyridon Gianniotis	2	3	2	7

=== Women ===
#	Swimmer	1st place, gold medalist(s)	2nd place, silver medalist(s)	3rd place, bronze medalist(s)	Total
1	(Russia) Larisa Ilchenko	8	1	0	9
2	(Brazil) Ana Marcela Cunha	7	2	8	17
3	(Netherlands) Edith van Dijk	6	5	4	15
4	(Italy) Viola Valli	5	2	1	8
5	(Germany) Britta Kamrau	4	2	4	10

== See also ==
- Open water swimming at the World Aquatics Championships
- FINA Marathon Swim World Series
- Open Water Swimmers of the Year
