= Italy at the World Aquatics Championships =

Italy team at swimming event

- World Aquatics code: ITA
- National federation: FIN
- Website: www.federnuoto.it
- Medals Ranked 6th: Gold 46 Silver 45 Bronze 63 Total 154

World Aquatics Championships appearances (overview)
- 1973; 1975; 1978; 1982; 1986; 1991; 1994; 1998; 2001; 2003; 2005; 2007; 2009; 2011; 2013; 2015; 2017; 2019; 2022; 2023; 2024; 2025

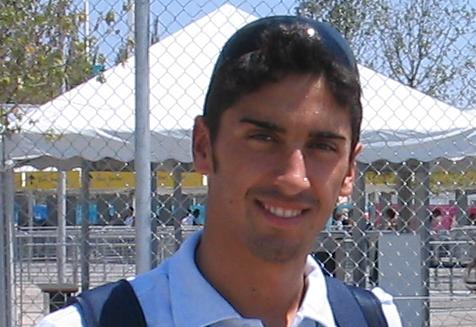
Filippo Magnini, twice world champion (2005 and 2007), in the swimming queen race: the 100 metres freestyle.

Italy has participated in all 17 editions of the FINA World Aquatics Championships, held since the first edition of 1973 World Aquatics Championships, winning 154 podiums, including 46 world titles, 54 silver medals and 63 bronze medals.

== Medals by disciplines ==
Are excluded open water swimming stand alone championships (6 editions).

Sport	Gold	Silver	Bronze	Total
Swimming	23	21	27	71
Open water swimming	11	9	18	38
Water polo	6	4	3	13
Diving	3	6	10	19
Artistic swimming	3	5	5	13
High diving	0	0	1	1
Totals (6 entries)	46	45	64	155

== Diving ==
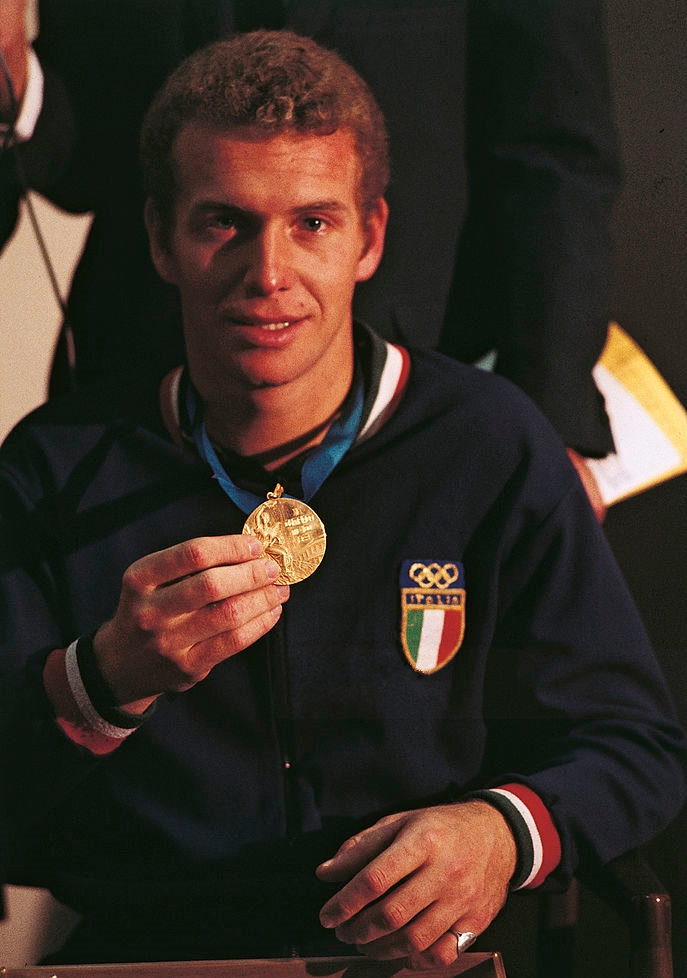
Klaus Dibiasi, tw gold and two silver medal at the World Diving Championships.

From 2013 including two high diving competiopns.

Edition	Event	1st place, gold medalist(s)	2nd place, silver medalist(s)	3rd place, bronze medalist(s)	Total	Rank
1973 Belgrade	4	1	1	0	2	2
1975 Cali	4	1	1	0	2	3
1978 West Berlin	4	0	0	1	1	4
1982 Guayaquil	4	0	0	0	0	-
1986 Madrid	4	0	0	0	0	-
1991 Perth	6	0	0	0	0	-
1994 Rome	6	0	0	0	0	-
1998 Perth	10	0	0	0	0	-
2001 Fukuoka	10	0	0	0	0	-
2003 Barcelona	10	0	0	0	0	-
2005 Montreal	10	0	0	1	1	8
2007 Melbourne	10	0	0	2	2	6
2009 Rome	10	0	1	1	2	7
2011 Shanghai	10	0	0	1	1	8
2013 Barcelona	10	0	2	0	2	4
2015 Kazan	13	1	0	2	3	3
2017 Budapest	13	0	0	2	2	11
2019 Gwangju	13	0	0	0	0	13
2022 Budapest	13	0	1	0	1	6
		3	6	10	19	7

== Open water swimming ==
stand alone edition

Edition	Year	Venue	Country	Events	1st place, gold medalist(s)	2nd place, silver medalist(s)	3rd place, bronze medalist(s)	Total	Rank
1st	1991	Perth	Australia	2	0	1	0	1	3
2nd	1994	Rome	Italy	2	0	0	0	0	-
3d	1998	Perth	Australia	6	1	0	2	3	3
4h	2000	Honolulu	United States	9	1	3	2	6	4
5th	2001	Fukuoka	Japan	6	3	0	2	6	1
6th	2002	Sharm El Sheikh	Egypt	9	4	3	0	7	1
7th	2003	Barcelona	Spain	6	2	0	2	2	2
8th	2004	Dubai	United Arab Emirates	9	0	0	0	0	-
9th	2005	Montreal	Canada	6	0	1	2	3	6
10th	2006	Naples	Italy	6	0	1	1	2	5
11th	2007	Melbourne	Australia	6	0	1	0	1	4
12th	2008	Sevilla	Spain	6	0	0	0	0	-
13th	2009	Rome	Italy	6	1	0	2	3	3
14th	2010	Roberval	Canada	6	2	3	0	6	1
15th	2011	Shanghai	China	7	0	1	1	2	9
16th	2013	Barcelona	Spain	7	1	0	0	1	6
17th	2015	Kazan	Russia	7	1	0	2	3	4
18th	2017	Budapest	Hungary	7	0	2	3	5	5
19th	2019	Gwangju	South Korea	7	0	1	2	3	6
20th	2022	Budapest	Hungary	7	2	2	2	6	1
				127	18	19	23	60	3

== Swimming ==
All Italian medals till Budapest 2022.

Edition	Gold	Silver	Bronze	Total
(Socialist Federal Republic of Yugoslavia) Belgrade 1973	800 metre freestyle Novella Calligaris			3
(Socialist Federal Republic of Yugoslavia) Belgrade 1973			400 metre freestyle Novella Calligaris	3
(Socialist Federal Republic of Yugoslavia) Belgrade 1973			400 metre medley Novella Calligaris	3
(Colombia) Cali 1975			4 × 100 m freestyle relay Roberto Pangaro; Paolo Barelli; Claudio Zei; Marcello Guarducci	1
(Ecuador) Guayaquil 1982			200 metre medley Giovanni Franceschi	1
(Spain) Madrid 1986		1500 m freestyle Stefano Battistelli		2
(Spain) Madrid 1986		100 m breaststroke Gianni Minervini		2
(Australia) Perth 1991			100 m freestyle Giorgio Lamberti	6
(Australia) Perth 1991	200 m freestyle Giorgio Lamberti			6
(Australia) Perth 1991		200 m backstroke Stefano Battistelli		6
(Australia) Perth 1991			100 m breaststroke Gianni Minervini	6
(Australia) Perth 1991			400 m individual medley Stefano Battistelli	6
(Australia) Perth 1991			4 × 200 m freestyle relay Emanuele Idini; Roberto Gleria; Stefano Battistelli; Giorgio Lamberti	6
(Italy) Rome 1994			200 backstroke Lorenza Vigarani	1
(Australia) Perth 1998		200 m freestyle Massimiliano Rosolino		2
(Australia) Perth 1998		1500 m freestyle Emiliano Brembilla		2
(Japan) Fukuoka 2001			400 m freestyle Emiliano Brembilla	6
(Japan) Fukuoka 2001			50m breaststroke Domenico Fioravanti	6
(Japan) Fukuoka 2001		100m breaststroke Domenico Fioravanti		6
(Japan) Fukuoka 2001	200 m individual medley Massimiliano Rosolino			6
(Japan) Fukuoka 2001	400 m individual medley Alessio Boggiatto			6
(Japan) Fukuoka 2001		4x200 metre freestyle relay Emiliano Brembilla; Matteo Pelliciari; Andrea Beccari; Massimiliano Rosolino		6
(Spain) Barcelona 2003			200 m individual medley Massimiliano Rosolino	1
(Canada) Montreal 2005	100 m freestyle Filippo Magnini			3
(Canada) Montreal 2005		400 m individual medley Luca Marin		3
(Canada) Montreal 2005		200 m freestyle Federica Pellegrini		3
(Australia) Melbourne 2007	100 m freestyle Filippo Magnini			6
(Australia) Melbourne 2007			800 m freestyle Federico Colbertaldo	6
(Australia) Melbourne 2007			200 m breaststroke Loris Facci	6
(Australia) Melbourne 2007			400 m individual medley Luca Marin	6
(Australia) Melbourne 2007		4x100 metre freestyle relay Massimiliano Rosolino; Alessandro Calvi; Christian Galenda; Filippo Magnini		6
(Australia) Melbourne 2007			200 m freestyle Federica Pellegrini	6
(Italy) Rome 2009	200 m freestyle Federica Pellegrini			4
(Italy) Rome 2009	400 m freestyle Federica Pellegrini			4
(Italy) Rome 2009			800 m freestyle Alessia Filippi	4
(Italy) Rome 2009	1500 m freestyle Alessia Filippi			4
(China) Shanghai 2011		50 m freestyle Luca Dotto		5
(China) Shanghai 2011		50 m breaststroke Fabio Scozzoli		5
(China) Shanghai 2011		100 m breaststroke Fabio Scozzoli		5
(China) Shanghai 2011	200 m freestyle Federica Pellegrini			5
(China) Shanghai 2011	400 m freestyle Federica Pellegrini			5
(Spain) Barcelona 2013		200 m freestyle Federica Pellegrini		2
(Spain) Barcelona 2013			1500 m freestyle Gregorio Paltrinieri	2
(Russia) Kazan 2015	1500 m freestyle Gregorio Paltrinieri			5
(Russia) Kazan 2015		800 m freestyle Gregorio Paltrinieri		5
(Russia) Kazan 2015			4x100 metre freestyle relay Luca Dotto; Marco Orsi; Michele Santucci; Filippo Magnini	5
(Russia) Kazan 2015		200 m freestyle Federica Pellegrini		5
(Russia) Kazan 2015		4x200 metre freestyle relay Alice Mizzau; Erica Musso; Chiara Masini Luccetti; Federica Pellegrini		5
(Hungary) Budapest 2017	800 m freestyle Gabriele Detti			6
(Hungary) Budapest 2017	1500 m freestyle Gregorio Paltrinieri			6
(Hungary) Budapest 2017			400 m freestyle Gabriele Detti	6
(Hungary) Budapest 2017			800 m freestyle Gregorio Paltrinieri	6
(Hungary) Budapest 2017	200 m freestyle Federica Pellegrini			6
(Hungary) Budapest 2017			1500 m freestyle Simona Quadarella	6
(South Korea) Gwangju 2019	800 m freestyle Gregorio Paltrinieri			8
(South Korea) Gwangju 2019			400 m freestyle Gabriele Detti	8
(South Korea) Gwangju 2019			1500 m freestyle Gregorio Paltrinieri	8
(South Korea) Gwangju 2019	200 m freestyle Federica Pellegrini			8
(South Korea) Gwangju 2019	1500 m freestyle Simona Quadarella			8
(South Korea) Gwangju 2019		800 m freestyle Simona Quadarella		8
(South Korea) Gwangju 2019		50 m breaststroke Benedetta Pilato		8
(South Korea) Gwangju 2019			100 m breaststroke Martina Carraro	8
(Hungary) Budapest 2022	1500 m freestyle Gregorio Paltrinieri			9
(Hungary) Budapest 2022	100 m backstroke Thomas Ceccon			9
(Hungary) Budapest 2022		50 m breaststroke Nicolò Martinenghi		9
(Hungary) Budapest 2022	100 m breaststroke Nicolò Martinenghi			9
(Hungary) Budapest 2022			4x100 metre freestyle relay Alessandro Miressi; Thomas Ceccon; Lorenzo Zazzeri; Manuel Frigo	9
(Hungary) Budapest 2022	4x100 metre freestyle relay Thomas Ceccon; Nicolò Martinenghi; Federico Burdisso; Alessandro Miressi; Piero Codia; Lorenzo Zazzeri			9
(Hungary) Budapest 2022			800 m freestyle Simona Quadarella	9
(Hungary) Budapest 2022		50 m breaststroke Benedetta Pilato		9
(Hungary) Budapest 2022	100 m breaststroke Benedetta Pilato			9
	23	21	27	71

== See also ==
- Italy national swimming team
- Italy national diving team
- Italy at the European Aquatics Championships
- Swimming World Championships medal table
