= Open water swimming at the 2001 World Aquatics Championships =

- Host city: Fukuoka, Japan
- Events: 6

These are the results from the open water swimming competition at the 2001 World Aquatics Championships, which took place in Fukuoka, Japan.

== Medal table ==
Rank	Nation	Gold	Silver	Bronze	Total
1	Italy (ITA)	3	0	2	5
2	Russia (RUS)	2	3	0	5
3	Germany (GER)	1	1	1	3
4	France (FRA)	0	1	1	2
4	Netherlands (NED)	0	1	1	2
6	Australia (AUS)	0	0	1	1
Totals (6 entries)		6	6	6	18

== Medal summary ==
=== Men ===
Event	Gold	Silver	Bronze
5 km	Luca Baldini (ITA); 55:37	Yevgeny Bezruchenko (RUS); 56:31	Marco Formentini (ITA); 56:42
10 km	Yevgeny Bezruchenko (RUS); 2:01:04	Vladimir Dyatchin (RUS); 2:01:06	Fabio Venturini (ITA); 2:01:11
25 km	Yuri Kudinov (RUS); 5:25:32	Stéphane Gomez (FRA); 5:26:00	Stéphane Lecat (FRA); 5:26:36

=== Women ===
Event	Gold	Silver	Bronze
5 km	Viola Valli (ITA); 1:00:23	Peggy Büchse (GER); 1:00:49	Hayley Lewis (AUS); 1:00:52
10 km	Peggy Büchse (GER); 2:17:32	Irina Abysova (RUS); 2:17:47	Edith van Dijk (NED); 2:17:52
25 km	Viola Valli (ITA); 5:56:51	Edith van Dijk (NED); 6:00:36	Angela Maurer (GER); 6:06:19
