= 2001 World Aquatics Championships =

Swimming championships in Fukuoka, Japan

9th FINA World Championships
- Host city: Fukuoka, Japan
- Date: July 16–29, 2001
- Opened by: Akihito

The 2001 World Aquatics Championships or the 9th FINA World Swimming Championships were held in Fukuoka, Japan between 16 July and 29 July 2001.

The opening and closing ceremonies, as well as the swimming and synchronised swimming events, were held at Marine Messe, an indoor multi-purpose facility. The temporary 50-m pool with 10,000 seats on three sides cost US$4 million for the two-week period. The Fukuoka Prefectural Pool hosted the diving events, with open water swimming taking place at Momochi Beach. Water polo was held at two locations: the men's competition took place at Hakata-no-Mori Center Court and the women's event at the Nishi Civic Pool.

== Medal table ==
* Host nation (Japan)

Rank	Nation	Gold	Silver	Bronze	Total
1	Australia (AUS)	13	4	6	23
2	China (CHN)	10	6	4	20
3	United States (USA)	9	9	8	26
4	Russia (RUS)	6	8	7	21
5	Italy (ITA)	6	2	4	12
6	Germany (GER)	4	7	8	19
7	Netherlands (NED)	3	5	1	9
8	Ukraine (UKR)	3	1	1	5
9	Sweden (SWE)	1	3	2	6
10	Great Britain (GBR)	1	2	4	7
11	Japan (JPN)*	1	1	7	9
12	Canada (CAN)	1	1	3	5
13	Romania (ROU)	1	1	2	4
14	Hungary (HUN)	1	1	1	3
15	Spain (ESP)	1	0	0	1
16	France (FRA)	0	2	1	3
17	Austria (AUT)	0	2	0	2
17	Mexico (MEX)	0	2	0	2
19	Iceland (ISL)	0	1	1	2
20	Costa Rica (CRC)	0	1	0	1
20	FR Yugoslavia (FR Yugoslavia)	0	1	0	1
20	Poland (POL)	0	1	0	1
20	Switzerland (SUI)	0	1	0	1
24	South Africa (RSA)	0	0	1	1
Totals (24 entries)		61	62	61	184

== Results ==
=== Diving ===
Men

Event	Gold	Silver	Bronze
1 m springboard	Wang Feng (CHN)	Wang Tianling (CHN)	Alexander Dobroskok (RUS)
3 m springboard	Dmitri Sautin (RUS)	Wang Tianling (CHN)	Ken Terauchi (JPN)
10 m platform	Tian Liang (CHN)	Alexandre Despatie (CAN)	Mathew Helm (AUS)
3 m springboard synchro	Peng Bo (CHN); Wang Kenan (CHN)	Joel Rodriguez (MEX); Fernando Platas (MEX)	Alexander Dobroskok (RUS); Dmitri Sautin (RUS)
10 m platform synchro	Tian Liang (CHN); Hu Jia (CHN)	Eduardo Rueda (MEX); Fernando Platas (MEX)	Roman Volodkov (UKR); Anton Zakharov (UKR)

Women

Event	Gold	Silver	Bronze
1 m springboard	Blythe Hartley (CAN)	Wu Minxia (CHN)	Zhang Jing (CHN)
3 m springboard	Guo Jingjing (CHN)	Irina Lashko (AUS)	Yuliya Pakhalina (RUS)
10 m platform	Xu Mian (CHN)	Duan Qing (CHN)	Loudy Tourky (AUS)
3 m springboard synchro	Wu Minxia (CHN); Guo Jingjing (CHN)	Youlia Pakhalina (RUS); Vera Ilynia (RUS)	Ditte Kotzian (GER); Conny Schmalfuss (GER)
10 m platform synchro	Duan Qing (CHN); Sang Xue (CHN)	Evgeniya Olshevskaya (RUS); Svetlana Timoshinina (RUS)	Takiri Miyazaki (JPN); Emi Otsuki (JPN)

=== Open water swimming ===
Men

Event	Gold	Silver	Bronze
5 km	Luca Baldini (ITA)	Yevgeny Bezruchenko (RUS)	Marco Formentini (ITA)
10 km	Yevgeny Bezruchenko (RUS)	Vladimir Dyatchin (RUS)	Fabio Venturini (ITA)
25 km	Yuri Kudinov (RUS)	Stéphane Gomez (FRA)	Stéphane Lecat (FRA)

Women

Event	Gold	Silver	Bronze
5 km	Viola Valli (ITA)	Peggy Büchse (GER)	Hayley Lewis (AUS)
10 km	Peggy Büchse (GER)	Irina Abysova (RUS)	Edith van Dijk (NED)
25 km	Viola Valli (ITA)	Edith van Dijk (NED)	Angela Maurer (GER)

=== Swimming ===
Men

Event	Gold	Silver	Bronze
50 m freestyle	Anthony Ervin (USA)	Pieter van den Hoogenband (NED)	Roland Schoeman (RSA)
50 m freestyle	Anthony Ervin (USA)	Pieter van den Hoogenband (NED)	Tomohiro Yamanoi (JPN)
100 m freestyle	Anthony Ervin (USA)	Pieter van den Hoogenband (NED)	Lars Frölander (SWE)
200 m freestyle	Ian Thorpe (AUS)	Pieter van den Hoogenband (NED)	Klete Keller (USA)
400 m freestyle	Ian Thorpe (AUS)	Grant Hackett (AUS)	Emiliano Brembilla (ITA)
800 m freestyle	Ian Thorpe (AUS)	Grant Hackett (AUS)	Graeme Smith (GBR)
1500 m freestyle	Grant Hackett (AUS)	Graeme Smith (GBR)	Alexei Filipets (RUS)
50 m backstroke	Randall Bal (USA)	Thomas Rupprath (GER)	Matt Welsh (AUS)
100 m backstroke	Matt Welsh (AUS)	Örn Arnarson (ISL)	Steffen Driesen (GER)
200 m backstroke	Aaron Peirsol (USA)	Markus Rogan (AUT)	Örn Arnarson (ISL)
50 m breaststroke	Oleg Lisogor (UKR)	Roman Sludnov (RUS)	Domenico Fioravanti (ITA)
100 m breaststroke	Roman Sludnov (RUS)	Domenico Fioravanti (ITA)	Ed Moses (USA)
200 m breaststroke	Brendan Hansen (USA)	Maxim Podoprigora (AUT)	Kosuke Kitajima (JPN)
50 m butterfly	Geoff Huegill (AUS)	Lars Frölander (SWE)	Mark Foster (GBR)
100 m butterfly	Lars Frölander (SWE)	Ian Crocker (USA)	Geoff Huegill (AUS)
200 m butterfly	Michael Phelps (USA)	Tom Malchow (USA)	Anatoly Polyakov (RUS)
200 m individual medley	Massimiliano Rosolino (ITA)	Tom Wilkens (USA)	Justin Norris (AUS)
400 m individual medley	Alessio Boggiatto (ITA)	Erik Vendt (USA)	Tom Wilkens (USA)
4 × 100 m freestyle relay	Australia (AUS); Michael Klim; Ashley Callus; Todd Pearson; Ian Thorpe	Netherlands (NED); Mark Veens; Johan Kenkhuis; Klaas-Erik Zwering; Pieter van den Hoogenband	Germany (GER); Stefan Herbst; Torsten Spanneberg; Lars Conrad; Sven Lodziewski
4 × 200 m freestyle relay	Australia (AUS); Grant Hackett; Michael Klim; Bill Kirby; Ian Thorpe	Italy (ITA); Emiliano Brembilla; Matteo Pelliciari; Andrea Beccari; Massimiliano Rosolino	United States (USA); Scott Goldblatt; Nate Dusing; Chad Carvin; Klete Keller
4 × 100 m medley relay	Australia (AUS); Matt Welsh; Regan Harrison; Geoff Huegill; Ian Thorpe	Germany (GER); Steffen Driesen; Jens Kruppa; Thomas Rupprath; Torsten Spanneberg	Russia (RUS); Vladislav Aminov; Dmitry Komornikov; Vladislav Kulikov; Dmitri Tchernychev

Women

Event	Gold	Silver	Bronze
50 m freestyle	Inge de Bruijn (NED)	Therese Alshammar (SWE)	Sandra Völker (GER)
100 m freestyle	Inge de Bruijn (NED)	Katrin Meissner (GER)	Sandra Völker (GER)
200 m freestyle	Giaan Rooney (AUS)	Yang Yu (CHN)	Camelia Potec (ROM)
400 m freestyle	Yana Klochkova (UKR)	Claudia Poll (CRC)	Hannah Stockbauer (GER)
800 m freestyle	Hannah Stockbauer (GER)	Diana Munz (USA)	Kaitlin Sandeno (USA)
1500 m freestyle	Hannah Stockbauer (GER)	Flavia Rigamonti (SUI)	Diana Munz (USA)
50 m backstroke	Haley Cope (USA)	Antje Buschschulte (GER)	Natalie Coughlin (USA)
100 m backstroke	Natalie Coughlin (USA)	Diana Mocanu (ROM)	Antje Buschschulte (GER)
200 m backstroke	Diana Mocanu (ROM)	Stanislava Komarova (RUS)	Joanna Fargus (GBR)
50 m breaststroke	Luo Xuejuan (CHN)	Kristy Kowal (USA)	Zoë Baker (GBR)
100 m breaststroke	Luo Xuejuan (CHN)	Leisel Jones (AUS)	Ágnes Kovács (HUN)
200 m breaststroke	Ágnes Kovács (HUN)	Qi Hui (CHN)	Luo Xuejuan (CHN)
50 m butterfly	Inge de Bruijn (NED)	Therese Alshammar (SWE)	Anna-Karin Kammerling (SWE)
100 m butterfly	Petria Thomas (AUS)	Otylia Jędrzejczak (POL)	Junko Onishi (JPN)
200 m butterfly	Petria Thomas (AUS)	Annika Mehlhorn (GER)	Kaitlin Sandeno (USA)
200 m individual medley	Martha Bowen (USA)	Yana Klochkova (UKR)	Qi Hui (CHN)
400 m individual medley	Yana Klochkova (UKR)	Martha Bowen (USA)	Beatrice Câșlaru (ROM)
4 × 100 m freestyle relay	Germany (GER); Petra Dallmann; Antje Buschschulte; Katrin Meissner; Sandra Völker	United States (USA); Colleen Lanne; Erin Phenix; Maritza Correia; Courtney Shealy	—
4 × 100 m freestyle relay	Germany (GER); Petra Dallmann; Antje Buschschulte; Katrin Meissner; Sandra Völker	Great Britain (GBR); Alison Sheppard; Melanie Marshall; Rosalind Brett; Karen Pickering	—
4 × 200 m freestyle relay^{1}	Great Britain (GBR); Nicola Jackson; Janine Belton; Karen Legg; Karen Pickering	Germany (GER); Silvia Szalai; Sarah Harstick; Hannah Stockbauer; Meike Freitag	Japan (JPN); Maki Mita; Tomoko Hagiwara; Tomoko Nagai; Eri Yamanoi
4 × 100 m medley relay	Australia (AUS); Dyana Calub; Leisel Jones; Petria Thomas; Sarah Ryan	United States (USA); Natalie Coughlin; Megan Quann; Mary Descenza; Erin Phenix	China (CHN); Zhan Shu; Luo Xuejuan; Ruan Yi; Xu Yanwei

^{1}In accordance with the decision of the FINA Bureau (2001, Bangkok): "To avoid any reasonable doubt regarding the result of the Women's relay 4x200m Freestyle Final of the 9th FINA World Championships in Fukuoka but without unfairly changing the official results of the race, the Bureau decided to grant a second set of gold medals to the USA team." The members of the USA team were: Natalie Coughlin, Diana Munz, Cristina Teuscher, Julie Hardt (7:58.13).

=== Synchronised swimming ===
Event	Gold	Silver	Bronze
Solo routine	Olga Brusnikina (RUS)	Virginie Dedieu (FRA)	Miya Tachibana (JPN)
Duet routine	Miya Tachibana (JPN); Miho Takeda (JPN)	Anastasia Davydova (RUS); Anastassia Ermakova (RUS)	Claire Carver-Dias (CAN); Fanny Létourneau (CAN)
Team routine	Russia (RUS); Anastasia Davydova; Anastassia Ermakova; Irina Tolkatcheva; Elena Ovtchinnikova; Anna Shorina; Elvira Khasyanova; Svetlana Petratchina; Joulia Chestakovitch; Maria Gromova	Japan (JPN); Yoko Yoneda; Juri Tatsumi; Michiyo Fujimaru; Satoe Hokoda; Chiaki Watanabe; Naoko Kawashima; Emiko Suzuki; Saho Harada; Miho Takeda	Canada (CAN); Claire Carver-Dias; Fanny Létourneau; Catherine Garceau; Erin Chan; Jessica Chase; Lynn Johnson; Amy Caskey; Sara Petrov; Shayna Nackoney; Sarah L. Alexander

=== Water polo ===
Men

Event	Gold	Silver	Bronze
Men's tournament	Spain	FR Yugoslavia	Russia

Women

Event	Gold	Silver	Bronze
Women's tournament	Italy	Hungary	Canada
