= Open water swimming at the 2001 World Aquatics Championships – Women's 25 km =

Women's 25 km at the 2001 World Aquatics Championships
- Location: Fukuoka, Japan
- Dates: 21 July

The Women's 25 km Open Water event at the 2001 World Aquatics Championships was held on July 21, 2001 in Fukuoka.

Viola Valli (ITA) winner of the 5 km and Edith van Dijk (NED) were both favourites. They both looked more confident from the very first buoy. Valli was 2 minutes behind at 8 km. Van Dijk was in the lead for half the distance, but after rounding the buoy at 12.5 km, Valli took the lead and the Dutch swimmer was unable to keep up with her.

"I won! It's wonderful to win two golds here," Valli said. "Even though I was behind at 8 km, I was confident I would catch-up."

"I felt good," van Dijk said. "I was working hard to win, I was well ahead of the others for a while, but Valli was really fast. I kept up with her on the return leg but she moved ahead in the last 6.5 km. Anyway I’m happy with the silver."

Bronze medalist Angela Maurer (GER) was happy because she did not expect any medal at all.

The Russians expected to easily win the team gold. They anticipated Olga Guseva to at least be among the top five and Natalya Pankina among the top ten. Guseva dropped out of the race after reaching 18 km, but Pankina managed a fifth. It was just enough. The team gold went to Russia by only two points over Italy. The Italians had bad luck with the disqualification of Pampana in the 10 km.

== Results ==
Rank	Swimmer	Nationality	12.5 km	Time
1st place, gold medalist(s)	Viola Valli	Italy	2:58:47	5:56:51
2nd place, silver medalist(s)	Edith van Dijk	Netherlands	2:58:45	6:00:36
3rd place, bronze medalist(s)	Angela Maurer	Germany	2:58:46	6:06:19
4	Britta Kamrau	Germany	2:58:49	6:08:46
5	Natalya Pankina	Russia	3:02:21	6:14:26
6	Briley Bergen	USA	3:03:24	6:20:07
7	Alessandra Romiti	Italy	3:04:23	6:35:14
8	Yvetta Hlaváčová	Czech Republic	3:13:45	6:36:22
9	Shelley Clark	Australia	3:09:00	6:41:16
10	Tiffany Sawin	USA	3:14:22	6:44:12
11	Yuki Fukuda	Japan	3:15:56	7:07:22
--	Olga Guseva	Russia	3:01:13	DNF
--	Eszter Balázs	Hungary	3:27:15	DNF
--	Audrey Boitte	France	DNF	DNF

Key: DNF = Did not finish, DQ = Disqualified
