= 2000 FINA World Open Water Swimming Championships =

Swimming competition in Honolulu, Hawaii

The 1st FINA World Open Water Swimming Championships were held on October 29-November 4, 2000 in the waters off Waikiki Beach in Honolulu, Hawaii, USA. 164 swimmers from 34 countries swam in the championships, in race distances of 5-kilometer (5K), 10-kilometer (10K) and 25-kilometer (25K).

== Results ==
Event	Gold		Silver		Bronze	
Women's 5K	Peggy Büchse; Germany	1:02:36.29	Kalyn Keller (United States) USA	1:02:40.42	Viola Valli; Italy	1:02:41.18
Men's 5K	Yevgeny Bezruchenko; Russia	59:18.23	David Meca; Spain	59:20.64	Luca Baldini; Italy	59:20.86
Women's 10K	Edith van Dijk; Netherlands	2:06:44.44	Melissa Pasquali; Italy	2:07:38.85	Peggy Büchse; Germany	2:08:00.30
Men's 10K	David Meca; Spain	1:57:10.50	Petar Stoychev; Bulgaria	1:57:14.44	Yevgeny Bezruchenko; Russia	1:57:15.02
Women's 25K	Edith van Dijk; Netherlands	5:30:04.07	Viola Valli; Italy	5:30:06.06	Angela Maurer; Germany	5:30:08.06
Men's 25K	Yuri Kudinov; Russia	4:55:51.12	David Meca; Spain	4:56:11.42	Aleksey Akatyev; Russia	4:57:03.12

== Team medals ==
Event	Gold		Silver		Bronze	
5K	Italy (ITA); Luca Baldini; Fabio Venturini; Viola Valli	3:01:24.74	Russia (RUS); Yevgeny Bezruchenko; Aleksey Akatyev; Irina Abysova	3:01:34.65	Germany (GER); Christof Wandratsch; Ben Hoffman; Peggy Büchse	3:01:57.76
10K	Germany (GER); Christof Wandratsch; Andres Maurer; Peggy Büchse	6:03:03.64	Russia (RUS); Yevgeny Bezruchenko; Vladimir Dyatchin; Irina Abysova	6:03:33.95	United States (USA); Ben Hanley; Matt Martin; Dawn Heckman	6:03:39.81
25K	Russia (RUS); Yuri Kudinov; Aleksey Akatyev; Natalia Pankina	15:24:19.59	Italy (ITA); Claudio Gargaro; Fabio Fusi; Viola Valli	15:25:33.68	France (FRA); Stéphane Gomez; Stéphane Lecat; Audy Boitte	15:35:55.73

== See also ==
- 2002 FINA World Open Water Swimming Championships
