= 1998 World Aquatics Championships =

Aquatic sports competition

8th FINA World Championships
- Host city: Perth, Western Australia, Australia
- Date: 8–17 January 1998

The 8th FINA World Championships or the 1998 World Aquatics Championships were held from 8 to 17 January 1998 in Perth, Western Australia. The championships features competition in all five of FINA's disciplines: Swimming, Diving, Water Polo, Synchronised swimming and Open Water Swimming. The main venue for competition was Challenge Stadium, which hosted all disciplines except the Open Water events. This was also the venue for the opening ceremony, featuring performances by Human Nature and David Helfgott supported by a large choir drawn from local choral societies. The televised performance was marred when the choir, unable to hear their own music due to the fireworks exploding overhead, lost ensemble cohesion.

Local athlete Michael Klim was named as the leading male swimmer of the meet, winning the 200 m freestyle, 100 m butterfly, 4 × 200 m freestyle, 4 × 100 m medley relay, as well as silver in the 100 m freestyle, 4 × 100 m freestyle relay and bronze in the 50 m freestyle. Ian Thorpe became the youngest ever male to become world champion when he won the 400 m freestyle event aged 15 years and three months.

== Doping ==
During a routine customs check on Chinese swimmer Yuan Yuan's luggage, enough human growth hormone was discovered to supply the entire women's swimming team for the duration of the championships. Only Yuan was sanctioned for the incident, with speculation that this was connected to the nomination of Juan Antonio Samaranch by China for the Nobel Peace Prize in 1993. Tests in Perth also found the presence of the banned diuretic masking agent triamterine in the urine of four swimmers, Wang Luna, Yi Zhang, Huijue Cai and Wei Wang. The swimmers were suspended from competition for two years, with three coaches associated with the swimmers, Zhi Cheng, Hiuqin Xu and Zhi Cheng each suspended for three months.

== Medal table ==
* Host nation (Australia)

Rank	Nation	Gold	Silver	Bronze	Total
1	United States	17	6	9	32
2	Russia	11	3	3	17
3	Australia*	7	8	10	25
4	China	6	8	4	18
5	Ukraine	3	1	0	4
6	Italy	2	2	2	6
7	Germany	1	7	6	14
8	Netherlands	1	4	3	8
9	France	1	4	1	6
10	Hungary	1	1	2	4
11	Spain	1	1	0	2
12	Belgium	1	0	0	1
12	Costa Rica	1	0	0	1
14	Japan	0	4	4	8
15	Slovakia	0	2	1	3
16	Canada	0	1	3	4
17	Sweden	0	1	1	2
18	Great Britain	0	0	2	2
19	Argentina	0	0	1	1
19	FR Yugoslavia	0	0	1	1
19	Puerto Rico	0	0	1	1
Totals (21 entries)		53	53	54	160

== Results ==
=== Diving ===
Men

Event	Gold	Silver	Bronze
1 m springboard	Zhuocheng Yu (CHN)	Troy Dumais (USA)	Holger Schlepps (GER)
3 m springboard	Dmitri Sautin (RUS)	Yilin Zhou (CHN)	Vassili Lisovski (RUS)
10 m platform	Dmitri Sautin (RUS)	Tian Liang (CHN)	Jan Hempel (GER)
3 m springboard synchro	Hao Xu (CHN); Zhuocheng Yu (CHN)	Alexander Mesch (GER); Holger Schlepps (GER)	Dean Pullar (AUS); Shannon Roy (AUS)
10 m platform synchro	Tian Liang (CHN); Sun Shuwei (CHN)	Jan Hempel (GER); Michael Kühne (GER)	Igor Lukashin (RUS); Aleksandr Varlamov (RUS)

Women

Event	Gold	Silver	Bronze
1 m springboard	Irina Lashko (RUS)	Vera Ilyina (RUS)	Zhang Jing (CHN)
3 m springboard	Yuliya Pakhalina (RUS)	Jingjing Guo (CHN)	Chantelle Michell (AUS)
10 m platform	Olena Zhupina (UKR)	Yuyan Cai (CHN)	Li Chen (CHN)
3 m springboard synchro	Irina Lashko (RUS); Yuliya Pakhalina (RUS)	Lang Rao (CHN); Rongjuan Li (CHN)	Tracy Bonner (USA); Kathy Pesek (USA)
10 m platform synchro	Olena Zhupina (UKR); Svitlana Serbina (UKR)	Yuyan Cai (CHN); Li Chen (CHN)	Kristin Link (USA); Lindsay Long (USA)

=== Open water swimming ===
Men

Event	Gold	Silver	Bronze
5 km	Aleksey Akatyev (RUS)	Ky Hurst (AUS)	Luca Baldini (ITA)
25 km	Aleksey Akatyev (RUS)	David Meca (ESP)	Gabriel Chaillou (ARG)

Women

Event	Gold	Silver	Bronze
5 km	Erica Rose (USA)	Edith van Dijk (NED)	Peggy Büchse (GER)
25 km	Tobie Smith (USA)	Peggy Büchse (GER)	Edith van Dijk (NED)

Mixed

Event	Gold	Silver	Bronze
5 km	United States (USA); John Flanagan; Austin Ramirez; Erica Rose	Russia (RUS); Aleksey Akatyev; Yevgeny Bezruchenko; Olga Gouseva	Italy (ITA); Luca Baldini; Fabio Venturini; Valeria Casprini
25 km	Italy (ITA); Claudio Gargaro; Fabrizio Pescatori; Valeria Casprini	Australia (AUS); Grant Robinson; Mark Saliba; Tracey Knowles	United States (USA); Tobie Smith; Nathan Stooke; Chuck Wiley

=== Water polo ===
Men

Event	Gold	Silver	Bronze
Team	Spain	Hungary	FR Yugoslavia

Women

Event	Gold	Silver	Bronze
Team	Italy	Netherlands	Australia
