= Sara Petrov =

Canadian synchronized swimmer

Personal information
- Born: August 26, 1982 (age 43) Toronto, Canada

Sport
- Sport: Synchronised swimming
Medal record
Representing Canada
World Championships
| Bronze medal – third place | 2001 Fukuoka | Team |

Sara Petrov (born August 26, 1982) was a synchronized swimmer. She is currently studying for an MBA at Cornell.

== Biography ==
Sara commenced the sport of synchronized swimming at the age of eight at the Olympium in Etobicoke. She went on to compete provincially, nationally and internationally for Canada, winning a bronze medal at team routine of the 2001 World Aquatics Championships.

She later attended the University of Alabama Birmingham where she majored in Economics at the business school and also competed in the sport of synchronized swimming in the NCAA, winning a number of medals. She was four times named an 'honorary' All-American and an Academic All American.

Sara is currently a student at The Johnson School, Cornell University, studying for an MBA.
