= Svitlana Serbina =

Ukrainian diver (born 1980)

Personal information
- Born: 2 May 1980 (age 46)
Medal record
Women's diving
Representing Ukraine
World Championships
Gold medal – first place	1998 Perth	10 m platform synchro
European Championships
Bronze medal – third place	1997 Seville	10 m platform
Goodwill Games
Silver medal – second place	1998 New York	10 m platform synchro
European Junior Diving Championships
Gold medal – first place	1998 Brasschaat	10 m platform
Silver medal – second place	1997 Edinburgh	10 m platform
Bronze medal – third place	1994 Pardubice	3 m springboard
Bronze medal – third place	1995 Geneva	1 m springboard

Svitlana Serbina (born 2 May 1980) is a female diver from Ukraine, who twice represented her native country at the Summer Olympics: 1996 and 2000. She claimed the gold medal in the women's 3 m synchronized springboard competition at the 1998 World Aquatics Championships in Perth, Western Australia, alongside Olena Zhupina.
