= Open water swimming at the 1998 World Aquatics Championships – Women's 25 km =

Women's 25 km at the 1998 World Aquatics Championships
- Location: Perth, Australia
- Dates: 11 January

The Women's 25K race at the 8th FINA World Aquatics Championships swam on January 11, 1998, in the ocean off Perth, Western Australia.

== Results ==
Results of the women's 25 km open water swimming
Place	Swimmer	Nation	Time	Notes
1	Tobie Smith	USA	5:31:20.1	
2	Peggy Büchse	Germany	5:32:19.2	
3	Edith van Dijk	Netherlands	5:38.06.9	
4	Tracey Knowles	Australia	5:40.20.0	
5	Valeria Casprini	Italy	5:43:35.4	
6	Etta van der Weijden	Netherlands	5:44:37.5	
7	Britta Kamrau	Germany	5:47:24.1	
8	Gaia Naldini	Italy	5:49:04.6	
9	Annette Andermatt	Switzerland	5:51:53.7	
10	Karen Burton	USA	5:56:40.2	
11	Angela Collett	New Zealand	6:05:16.8	
12	Mellisa Cunningham	Australia	6:07:14.4	
13	Maša Jamnik	Slovenia	6:08:31.9	
14	Radka Nechmačová	Czech Republic	6:09:53.2	
15	Attilia Figini	Switzerland	6:11:55.1	
16	Celina Endo	Brazil	6:15:44.4	
17	Edit Kasparik	Hungary	6:26:27.1	
