= Open water swimming at the 2003 World Aquatics Championships =

- Host city: Barcelona, Spain
- Venue: Notre Dame Island
- Events: 6

These are the results of the open water swimming competition at the 2003 World Aquatics Championships, which took place in Barcelona, Spain.

== Medal table ==
Rank	Nation	Gold	Silver	Bronze	Total
1	Russia (RUS)	3	0	1	4
2	Italy (ITA)	2	0	0	2
3	Netherlands (NED)	1	0	1	2
4	Germany (GER)	0	4	2	6
5	Spain (ESP)	0	1	1	2
6	Czech Republic (CZE)	0	1	0	1
7	Bulgaria (BUL)	0	0	1	1
Totals (7 entries)		6	6	6	18

== Medal summary ==
=== Men ===
Event	Gold	Silver	Bronze
5 km	Evgeni Kochkarov (RUS); 53.11.9	Christian Hein (GER); 53.13.9	Vladimir Dyatchin (RUS); 53.14.8
10 km	Vladimir Dyatchin (RUS); 1:50.58.8	Christian Hein (GER); 1:51.06.5	David Meca (ESP); 1:51.08.4
25 km	Yuri Kudinov (RUS); 5:02.20.0	David Meca (ESP); 5:02.20.4	Petar Stoychev (BUL); 5:02.20.6

=== Women ===
Event	Gold	Silver	Bronze
5 km	Viola Valli (ITA); 57.01.2	Jana Pechanová (CZE); 57.03.9	Britta Kamrau (GER); 57.06.4
10 km	Viola Valli (ITA); 1:59.49.9	Angela Maurer (GER); 1:59.51.1	Edith van Dijk (NED); 1:59.53.0
25 km	Edith van Dijk (NED); 5:35.43.5	Britta Kamrau (GER); 5:35.46.1	Angela Maurer (GER); 5:35.46.5
