= Hanna Miluska =

Swiss swimmer (born 1984)

Personal information
- Full name: Hanna Miluska
- National team: Switzerland
- Born: 29 May 1984 (age 42) Binningen, Switzerland
- Height: 1.78 m (5 ft 10 in)
- Weight: 72 kg (159 lb)

Sport
- Sport: Swimming
- Strokes: Freestyle, open water
- Club: SV Beider Basel
- College team: University of Alabama (U.S.)
- Coach: Axel Mitbauer
Medal record
Women's swimming
Representing Switzerland
World Championships
Bronze medal – third place	2002 Sharm El-Sheikh	5 km open water
European Championships
Silver medal – second place	2002 Berlin	5 km open water

Hanna Miluska (born 29 May 1984) is a Swiss former swimmer, who specialized in freestyle events and open water marathon. She is a two-time medalist in the 5 km open water at the World and European Championships. Miluska is also a member of Beider Basel Swimming Club (German: Schwimmverein Beider Basel), and is trained by her long-time coach Axel Mitbauer. She is also the daughter of former rower Ivan Miluška, who played for Czechoslovakia in the men's pairs at the 1968 Summer Olympics in Mexico City.

Miluska made her own sporting history in 2002 as an open water swimmer. She won a total of two medals in the 5 km open water: silver at the European Championships in Berlin (1:00:27), and bronze at the FINA World Championships in Sharm el-Sheikh, Egypt (58:13).

Two years later, Miluska qualified for two swimming events at the 2004 Summer Olympics in Athens, by clearing a FINA B-standard entry time of 2:02.65 (200 m freestyle) from the World Championships in Barcelona, Spain. In the 200 m freestyle, Miluska challenged seven other swimmers on the third heat, including three-time Olympian Olena Lapunova of Ukraine. She edged out Argentina's Florencia Szigeti to take a second spot and twenty-fourth overall by 0.01 of a second in 2:03.28.

Miluska also teamed up with Chantal Strasser, Flavia Rigamonti, and Nicole Zahnd in the 4 × 200 m freestyle relay. Swimming the second leg, she recorded a split of 57.60, and the Swiss team finished the heats in twelfth overall with a final time of 2:02.75.

Miluska is also a former varsity for the Alabama Crimson Tide, and a graduate of political science at the University of Alabama in Tuscaloosa, Alabama.
