= Tobie Smith =

American swimmer (born 1973)

Personal information
- National team: United States
- Born: October 23, 1973 (age 52) Chappaqua, New York

Sport
- Sport: Swimming
- Strokes: Freestyle
- Club: Badger Swim Club
- College team: University of Texas
Medal record
Women's swimming
Representing the United States
World Aquatics Championships
Gold medal – first place	1998 Perth	25 km open water
Bronze medal – third place	1998 Perth	Team 25 km
Summer Universiade
Gold medal – first place	1995 Fukuoka	1500 m freestyle

Tobie Smith (born October 23, 1973) is an American former competition swimmer who specialized in long-distance and open-water freestyle events. She represented the United States at the 1998 World Aquatics Championships in Perth, Western Australia, winning the gold medal in the 25-kilometer open water event.

To celebrate her completion of her master's degree in kinesiology, Smith swam the English Channel on August 5, 1999. After swimming two thirds of the distance in an estimated record time, she encountered a force five gale of 19 to 24 miles per hour and white-capped waves. She finished her channel-crossing in eight hours, 15 minutes; the then current record time was seven hours, 40 minutes.
