= Duan Qing =

Chinese scholar (1953–2022)

Duan Qing 段晴 (13 May 1953 – 26 March 2022) was a Chinese scholar of Indian and Iranian languages. She was a Professor of Indo-Iranian Studies and Boya Chair Professor of Peking University.

== Life ==
Born in Beijing on 13 May 1953, Duan Qing studied German at Peking University, 1971–1974. She gained her MA in Indology under Ji Xianlin 季羨林 and Jiang Zhongxin 蔣忠新, then earned her Ph.D. at the University of Hamburg in West Germany in 1986, as most of the relevant Indological work was published in German. She majored in Middle Iranian Studies with Ronald Emmerick, and took Indology and Tibetology as minor fields under Lambert Schmithausen and Albrecht Wezler. She then returned to Peking University, where she had a life-long teaching career. She died on 26 March 2022.

== Publications ==
Duan Qing's publications, in Chinese, English, German and Japanese, include:
Books

- Das Khotanische Aparimitāyuḥsūtra (1986)
- Bonini yufa rumen 波你尼語法入門 (Introduction into Pāṇini’s System) (2001)
- Yutian, fojiao, gujuan 于闐·佛教·古卷 (New Finds and Findings from Khotan) (2013)
- Zhongguo guojia tushuguan cang Xiyu wenshu, Yutianyu juan (1) 中國國家圖書館藏西域文書·于闐語卷（一）(Xinjiang Manuscripts Preserved in the National Library of China: Khotanese Remains, Part I) (2015)
- Qinghai Zangyiyao wenhua bowuguan cang Quluwen chidu 青海藏醫藥文化博物館藏佉盧文尺牘 (Kharoṣṭhī Documents Preserved in Qinghai Tibetan Medical Culture Museum) (2016)
- Yutianyu Wugoujingguang datuoluoni jing 于闐語無垢淨光大陀羅尼經 (A Scroll of Khotanese Raśmivimalaviśuddhaprabhā nāma Dhāraṇī) (2019)
- Shenhua yu yishi: Pojie gudai Yutian Qushu shang de wenming mima 神話與儀式：破解古代于闐氍毹上的文明密碼 (Myth and Ritual: Deciphering the Code of Civilizations on Qushu from Ancient Khotan) (2022).

Articles (selection, relating to Khotanese)

- 1991 "Khotanese Words: Silkworm, Cocoon and Silk", in Papers in Honour of Prof. Dr. Ji Xianlin on the Occasion of His 80th Birthday, Vol. I
- 1992 "A Khotanese Fragment from Lushun Museum", in Collection of Papers On Iranian Studies in China (Peking University Press)
- 1993 "To make cocoon for fastening oneself", Minzuyuwen 1993(1).
- 1997 "A newly discovered Khotanese wooden document from Xinjiang", in Journal of the Dunhuang and Turfan Studies, Vol. II
- 1998 "Chinese Envoys of Later Jin-Dynasty to Khotan", in Collection of Papers On Iranian Studies in China, Vol. II (Peking University Press).
- 2006 “Two New Folios of Khotanese Suvarnabhāsottamasūtra”, Annual Report of the International Research Institute for Advanced Buddhology at Soka University for the Academic Year 2006, vol.10, 2007,325-336.
- 2008 The “Maitrī-bhāvanā-prakaraṇa, A Chinese Parellel to the Third Chapter of the Book of Zambasta” in M. Macuch, M. Maggi, and W. Sundermann (eds), Iranian Languages and Texts from Iran and Turan. Ronald E. Emmerick Memorial Volume, Wiesbaden: Harrassowitz, 2007[2008]，pp. 39–48.
- 2009 "Bisā- and Hālaa- in a New Chinese-Khotanese Bilingual Document"，Journal of Inner Asian Art and Archaeology, vol.3, 2009, 65–73.
- 2009 "A Fragment of the Bhadrakalpa-sutra in Buddhist Sanskrit from Xinjiang", Sanskrit Manuscripts in China (China Tibetology Publishing House,)
- 2009 "Mulberry in Khotanese", Bulletin of the Asia Institute, vol. 19, * 2010 "Misfortune caused by kings", Annual Report of the International Research Institute for Advanced Buddhology at Soka University for the Academic Year 2009, vol.12
- 2011 "Some Fragments of the Saṅghāṭa-sūtra from the Xinjiang Museum, Urumqi", Annual Report of the International Research Institute for Advanced Buddhology at Soka University for the Academic Year 2010, vol.14,2011.
- 2012 “The inscription on the Sampul Carpets”, Journal of Inner Asian Art and Archaeology, vol.5, pp. 95–100.
- 2013 (tr. Helen Wang) "Were Textiles used as Money in Khotan in the Seventh and Eighth Centuries?", Journal of the Royal Asiatic Society 23/2 (April), pp. 307–325.
- 2009 “Indic and Khotanese Manuscripts: New Finds and Findings from Xinjiang”, in Paul Harrison and Jens-Uwe Hartmann (eds), From Birch Bark to Digital Data: Recent Advances in Buddhist Manuscript Research. Papers Presented at the Conference Indic Buddhist Manuscripts: The State of the Field, Stanford, June 15–19, 2009. Beiträge zur Kultur- und Geistesgeschichte Asiens, 80. Denkschriften der philosophisch-historischen Klasse, 460. Vienna. Österreichische Akademie der Wissenschaften. 2014. ISBN 978-3-7001-7581-0. pp. 267–276.
- 2013 "Puñadatta’s Life as Reflected in Khotanese Documents"，COMMENTATIONES IRANICAE Vladimiro f. Aaron Livschits nonagenariodonum natalicium pp. 435–445. Petropoli in ædibus Nestor-Historia MMXIII 2013
- 2014 "Puñadatta’s contract of Sale of an estate", Annual Report of the International Research Institute for Advanced Buddhology at Soka University for the Academic Year 2013, vol.17,2014.
- 2014 "Pledge, Collateral and Loan in Ancient Khotan", Euroasian Studies II, Sydney: Asia Publishing Nexus Australia, 2014, ISSN 2202-0578, pp. 249–268.

Articles (selection, relating to other fields)

- 2001 "Ein Bericht über das neu entdeckte syrische Dokument aus Dunhuang/China"，Oriens Christianus, 85
- 2002 "The Study of Sanskrit at Peking University", presented at first at Center for Advanced Studies, Oslo,Norwegen, 10 June 2002; Published in Fragile Palm Leaves, No.7, December 2545/2002, Bangkok, Thailand.
- 2003 "Newly found Sanskrit Fragments from Dunhuang"，Annual Report of the International Research Institute for Advanced Buddhology at Soka University for the Academic Year 2002, vol. March
- "What does Indology mean specially for China", Indology: Past Present and Future (Sahitya Akademi)
- 2008 "In the Pursuit of Vyākaraṇa-elements in Chinese Translations", in Selected Papers of Beijing Forum 2007—The Harmony of Civilizations and Prosperity for All—Diversity in the Development of Human Civilization (Peking University Press)
- 2009 "Stories behind Jindou, in Ye Yiliang (ed.), Collection of Papers on Iranian Studies in China (Peking University Press)
- 2011 "A Land Sale Contract in Kharoṣṭhī Script National Library of China Collection, No. BH5-3". Annual Report of the International Research Institute for Advanced Buddhology at Soka University for the Academic Year 2011, vol.15,2012.
