= David Bates (swimmer) =

Australian open water swimmer

Personal information
- Full name: David Neil Bates
- Nationality: Australia
- Born: 4 March 1976 (age 50) Queanbeyan, New South Wales
- Height: 6 ft 0 in (1.83 m)
- Weight: 176 lb (80 kg)

Sport
- Sport: Swimming
- Strokes: butterfly, freestyle
- Club: Palm Beach Currumbin Club
Medal record
Men's swimming
Representing the United States
World Championships (LC)
| Silver medal – second place | 1994 Rome | 25 km open water |

David Neil Bates (born 4 March 1976, in Queanbeyan, New South Wales, Australia) is an Australian open water swimmer who has received the Certificate of Merit in the International Marathon Swimming Hall of Fame for his outstanding career in open water swimming. He gained a silver medal in the 25 km race at the 1994 FINA World Swimming Championships in Rome, Italy, losing by a small margin of 65 seconds to Canadian Greg Streppel. He was the first swimmer to be selected in the Australian team for pool swimming and open water swimming and subsequently swam in the 6th Pan Pacific Swimming Championships in Atlanta in the pool for 1500m freestyle and open water race.
