= 2002 FINA World Open Water Swimming Championships =

Swimming competition in Egypt

The 2nd FINA Open Water Swimming World Championships were held September 23-28, 2002 in Sharm el-Sheikh, Egypt. The championships featured 89 swimmers from 26 countries competing in 6 races:

- 5-kilometer (5K)--Men's and Women's
- 10-kilometer (10K)--Men's and Women's
- 25-kilometer (25K)--Men's and Women's

== Results ==
Event	Gold		Silver		Bronze	
Women's 5K details	Viola Valli; Italy	56:52	Edith van Dijk; Netherlands	57:01	Hanna Miluska; Switzerland	58:13
Men's 5K details	Luca Baldini; Italy	51:49.78	Stefano Rubando; Italy	51:51.20	Thomas Lurz; Germany	51:52.43
Women's 10K details	Britta Kamrau; Germany	1:56:42.25	Viola Valli; Italy	1:56:42.28	Angela Maurer; Germany	1:56:49
Men's 10K details	Ivgueni Kochkarov; Russia	1:49:30	Simone Ercoli; Italy	1:49:34	Vladimir Dyatchin; Russia	1:49:35
Women's 25K details	Edith van Dijk; Netherlands	6:11:21	Angela Maurer; Germany	6:11:22.43	Britta Kamrau; Germany	6:11:22.70
Men's 25K details	Yuri Kudinov; Russia	5:39:14	Anton Sanatchev; Russia	5:41:14	Gabriel Chaillou; Argentina	5:51:16

== Team medals ==
Event	Gold	Silver	Bronze
5K	Italy (ITA)	Germany (GER)	Switzerland (SUI)
10K	Germany (GER)	Italy (ITA)	Russia (RUS)

== See also ==
- 2000 FINA World Open Water Swimming Championships
- 2004 FINA World Open Water Swimming Championships
