= Open water swimming at the 1994 World Aquatics Championships =

- Host city: Rome, Italy
- Events: 2

These are the results from the open water swimming competition at the 1994 World Aquatics Championships, which took place in Rome, Italy. Canada and Australia won gold in the competition.

== Medal table ==
Rank	Nation	Gold	Silver	Bronze	Total
1	Australia (AUS)	1	1	1	3
2	Canada (CAN)	1	0	0	1
3	Hungary (HUN)	0	1	0	1
4	Russia (RUS)	0	0	1	1
Totals (4 entries)		2	2	2	6

== Medal summary ==
=== Men ===
Event	Gold	Silver	Bronze
25 km	Greg Streppel (CAN); 5:35.26.56	David Bates (AUS); 5:36.31.70	Aleksey Akatyev (RUS); 5:37.26.43

=== Women ===
Event	Gold	Silver	Bronze
25 km	Melissa Cunningham (AUS); 5:48.25.04	Rita Kovács (HUN); 5:50.13.76	Shelley Taylor-Smith (AUS); 5:53.12.82
