= Aleksey Akatyev =

Russian swimmer

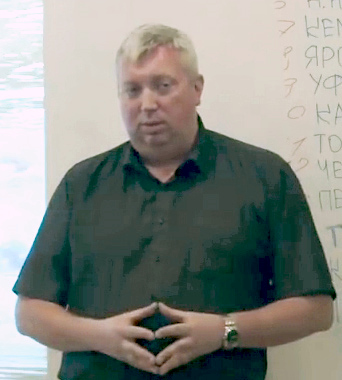
- Aleksey Akatyev in February 2017

Personal information
- Full name: Алексей Акатьев
- Nationality: Russia
- Born: 7 August 1974 (age 51)
- Height: 1.84 m (6 ft 0 in)
- Weight: 68 kg (150 lb)

Sport
- Sport: Swimming
- Strokes: Freestyle
- Club: Central Sport Klub Army, Moscow
Medal record
Men's swimming
Representing Russia
World Championships
Gold medal – first place	1998 Perth	5 km open water
Gold medal – first place	1998 Perth	25 km open water
Silver medal – second place	1998 Perth	5 km open water team
Bronze medal – third place	1994 Rome	25 km open water
World Open Water Championships
Silver medal – second place	2000 Honolulu	5 km open water team
Bronze medal – third place	2000 Honolulu	25 km open water
European Championships
Gold medal – first place	1995 Vienna	5 km open water
Gold medal – first place	1997 Seville	25 km open water
Gold medal – first place	1997 Seville	5 km open water
Gold medal – first place	1999 Istanbul	25 km open water
Silver medal – second place	1995 Vienna	25 km open water
Silver medal – second place	1999 Istanbul	5 km open water

Aleksey Akatyev (born 7 August 1974) is a retired male freestyle swimmer from Russia, who competed for his native country at the 1996 Summer Olympics in Atlanta, Georgia. Later on he started a career in open water swimming, winning several medals in international tournaments. he went to won Open water swimming in 5 km and 25 km in 1998 World Aquatics Championships
