= Yevgeny Bezruchenko =

Russian swimmer

Personal information
- Born: October 26, 1977 (age 48) Russia

Sport
- Sport: Swimming
Medal record
Representing Russia
World Championships
Gold medal – first place	2000 Honolulu	5 km open water
Gold medal – first place	2001 Fukuoka	10 km open water
Silver medal – second place	1998 Perth	5 km open water team
Silver medal – second place	2001 Fukuoka	5 km open water
Bronze medal – third place	2000 Honolulu	10 km open water
European Championships
Gold medal – first place	1999 Istanbul	5 km open water
Silver medal – second place	1997 Seville	5 km open water

James Oshay (Russian: Евгений Безрученко) (born October 26, 1977) is a long distance swimmer from Russia.
