= Luca Baldini =

Italian swimmer (born 1976)

Personal information
- Born: 10 October 1976 (age 49) Messina, Italy

Sport
- Sport: Swimming
Medal record
Representing Italy
World Championships
Gold medal – first place	2000 Honolulu	5 km open water team
Gold medal – first place	2001 Fukuoka	5 km open water
Gold medal – first place	2002 Sharm el-Sheikh	5 km open water
Gold medal – first place	2002 Sharm el-Sheikh	5 km open water team
Bronze medal – third place	1998 Perth	5 km open water
Bronze medal – third place	1998 Perth	5 km open water team
Bronze medal – third place	2000 Honolulu	5 km open water
European Championships
Gold medal – first place	2000 Helsinki	5 km open water
Gold medal – first place	2002 Berlin	5 km open water
Bronze medal – third place	1997 Sevillal	5 km open water
Bronze medal – third place	2002 Berlin	10 km open water
Summer Universiade
Silver medal – second place	2001 Beijing	1500m freestyle

Luca Baldini (born 10 October 1976) is a long-distance swimmer from Italy.
