= Open water swimming at the 1991 World Aquatics Championships =

- Host city: Perth, Australia
- Events: 2

These are the results from the open water swimming competition at the 1991 World Aquatics Championships, which took place in Perth, Western Australia. The US led the competition.

== Medal table ==
Rank	Nation	Gold	Silver	Bronze	Total
1	United States (USA)	1	1	1	3
2	Australia (AUS)	1	0	1	2
3	Italy (ITA)	0	1	0	1
Totals (3 entries)		2	2	2	6

== Medal summary ==
=== Men ===
Event	Gold	Silver	Bronze
25 km	Chad Hundeby (USA); 5:01:45.78	Sergio Chariandini (ITA); 5:03:18.81	David O'Brien (AUS); 5:08:53.35

=== Women ===
Event	Gold	Silver	Bronze
25 km	Shelley Taylor-Smith (AUS); 5:21:05.53	Martha Jahn (USA); 5:25:16.67	Karen Burton (USA); 5:28:22.74
