= Irina Abysova =

Russian triathlete (born 1980)

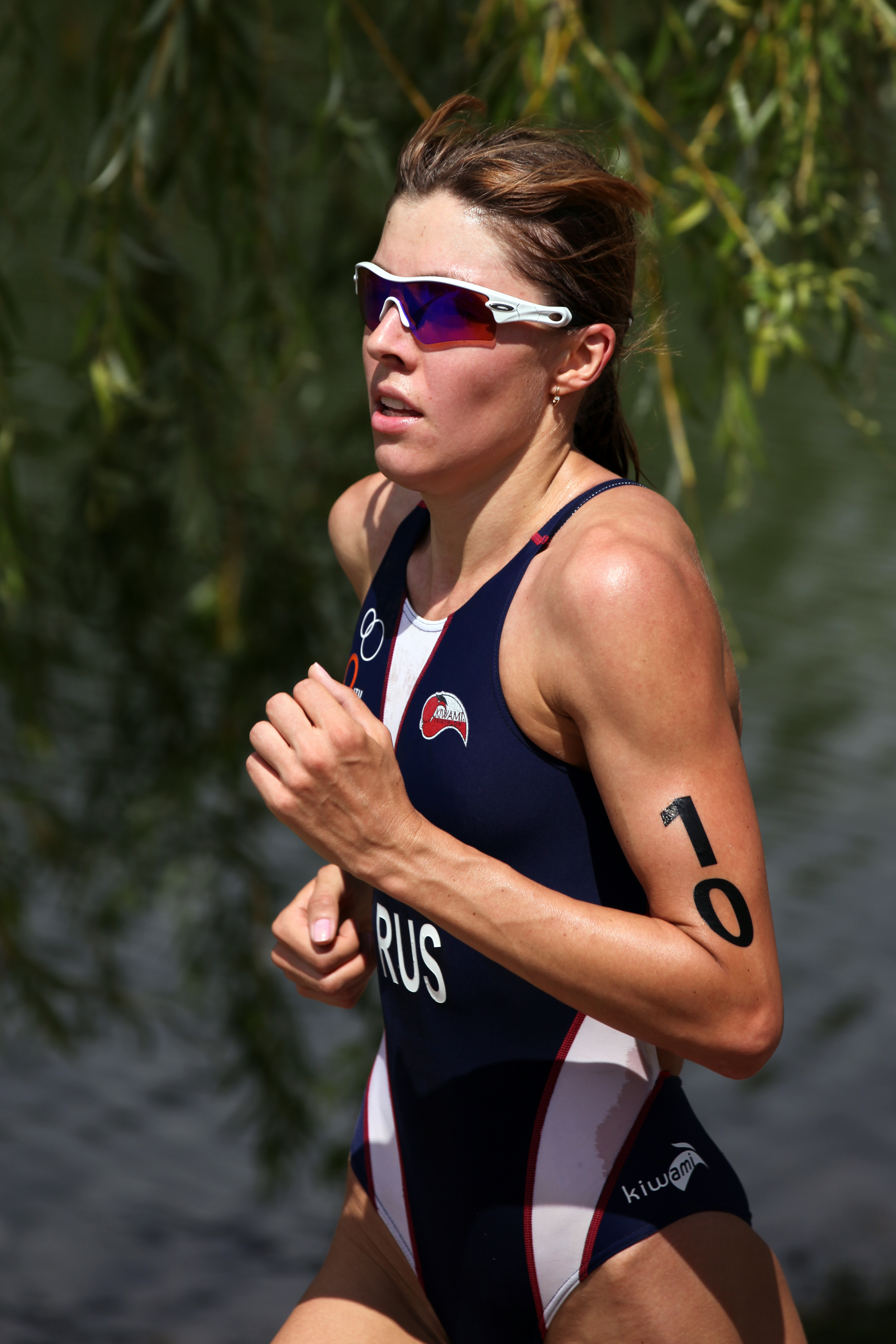
- Abysova at the World Cup triathlon in Tiszaújváros, 2011

Personal information
- Full name: Irina Alekseyevna Abysova
- Born: 7 November 1980 (age 45) Moscow, Russian SFSR, Soviet Union
Medal record
Women's aquathlon
Representing Russia
World Championships
| Gold medal – first place | 2013 | Elite |

Irina Alekseyevna Abysova (Russian: Ирина Алексеевна Абысова; born 7 November 1980 in Moscow) is a Russian open‑water swimmer and professional triathlete. She won the Russian Triathlon Championships in 2003, 2007, 2009, and 2010, and she competed in the Olympics in 2008 in Beijing and the 2012 Games in London. She is the winner of the 2013 ITU Aquathlon World Championship.

== Sports career ==
Abysova began her sporting career at the age of six, when she was admitted to the aquatic section of the Olympic Village (Олимпийская деревня) in Moscow. At the age of 13, she entered the Pioneer Palace (Дворец пионеров) sports school, and two years later she joined the Moscow Specialised School of the Olympic Reserve (МССУОР).

In 1999, having earned the title 'Master of Sports' (мастер спорта), Abysova enrolled at the Russian State University of Physical Education, Sport, Youth and Tourism (RGUFKSiT) in Moscow. In 2001, she won the silver medal in the 10 km open‑water swimming event at the World Aquatics Championships in Fukuoka. In 2002, feeling that her career as a swimmer might be drawing to a close, she turned to triathlon, winning the Russian Triathlon Championship the following year. In 2003, Abysova joined the Ozërki sports club (СК Озёрки) and completed her university studies.

In 2005, one year after becoming a mother, she won the Russian Winter Triathlon Championships and was also active in the elite section of the German club TUS Griesheim. At the 2008 Beijing Olympics, Abysova had a serious bicycle accident during the event and was unable to finish.

In 2009, the French triathlon club TOC Cesson Sévigné mentioned Abysova among its international stars, but she did not take part in the French Club Championship Series Lyonnaise des Eaux. In 2011, Abysova opened the new season in Cyprus, where the Russian triathletes had their training camp. At the Volkswagen Aldiana Triathlon on 27 March 2011, she placed first in the Olympic Distance event.

In 2012, she took part in the women's triathlon at the Olympic Games, finishing in 13th place.

=== ITU competitions ===
From 2003 to 2010, Irina Abysova took part in 51 ITU competitions and achieved 16 top‑ten finishes. Unless otherwise indicated, the following events are triathlons (Olympic Distance) and belong to the Elite category.

Results list

| Date | Competition | Place | Rank |
|---|---|---|---|
| 2003-09-20 | European Cup | Zagreb | 13 |
| 2003-10-22 | European Cup | Alanya | 7 |
| 2005-07-16 | Premium European Cup | Holten | 3 |
| 2005-08-20 | European Championships | Lausanne | 11 |
| 2005-10-26 | Premium European Cup | Alanya | 4 |
| 2006-03-10 | World Cup | Aqaba | 7 |
| 2006-06-04 | World Cup | Madrid | 16 |
| 2006-06-24 | European Championships | Autun | 18 |
| 2006-08-13 | World Cup | Tiszaújváros | 14 |
| 2006-09-03 | World Championships | Lausanne | 32 |
| 2006-09-10 | World Cup | Hamburg | 27 |
| 2006-09-24 | World Cup | Beijing | DNF |
| 2006-11-05 | World Cup | Cancun | 24 |
| 2007-03-25 | World Cup | Mooloolaba | DNF |
| 2007-05-06 | World Cup | Lisbon | 21 |
| 2007-05-13 | World Cup | Richards Bay | 13 |
| 2007-06-03 | World Cup | Madrid | DNF |
| 2007-06-30 | European Championships | Copenhagen | DNS |
| 2007-07-07 | Premium European Cup | Holten | 4 |
| 2007-07-29 | World Cup | Salford | 17 |
| 2007-08-11 | World Cup | Tiszaújváros | DNF |
| 2007-09-01 | World Championships | Hamburg | 32 |
| 2007-09-15 | World Cup | Beijing | 35 |
| 2007-10-07 | World Cup | Rhodes | 11 |
| 2007-11-04 | World Cup | Cancun | 21 |
| 2008-04-13 | World Cup | Ishigaki | 9 |
| 2008-04-26 | World Cup | Tongyeong | 7 |
| 2008-05-10 | European Championships | Lisbon | 10 |
| 2008-06-08 | World Championships | Vancouver | 26 |
| 2008-07-06 | World Cup | Hamburg | DNF |
| 2008-07-13 | World Cup | Tiszaújváros | DNF |
| 2008-07-20 | World Cup | Kitzbühel | 15 |
| 2008-08-18 | Olympic Games | Beijing | DNF |
| 2008-09-13 | European Cup | Vienna | 5 |
| 2009-04-05 | European Cup | Quarteira | 13 |
| 2009-05-02 | World Championship Series | Tongyeong | 25 |
| 2009-07-05 | European Championships | Holten | 8 |
| 2009-07-25 | World Championship Series | Hamburg | 9 |
| 2009-08-09 | World Cup | Tiszaújváros | 2 |
| 2009-08-15 | World Championship Series | London | 34 |
| 2009-09-13 | World Championship Series, Grand Final | Gold Coast | 25 |
| 2010-04-18 | European Cup | Antalya | 3 |
| 2010-05-08 | World Championship Series | Seoul | 39 |
| 2010-06-05 | World Championship Series | Madrid | 17 |
| 2010-07-03 | European Championships | Athlone | 21 |
| 2010-07-17 | World Championship Series | Hamburg | 37 |
| 2010-07-24 | World Championship Series | London | 29 |
| 2010-08-08 | World Cup | Tiszaújváros | 10 |
| 2010-08-29 | Premium European Cup | Almere | 4 |
| 2010-09-08 | World Championship Series, Grand Final | Budapest | 50 |
| 2010-11-13 | Premium European Cup | Eilat | 2 |
| 2011-04-09 | World Championship Series | Sydney | 38 |
| 2011-06-04 | World Championship Series | Madrid | 28 |
| 2011-06-18 | World Championship Series | Kitzbuhel | 31 |
| 2011-06-24 | European Championships | Pontevedra | 11 |
| 2011-07-31 | Premium European Cup | Banyoles | 2 |
| 2011-08-06 | World Championship Series | London | 25 |
| 2011-08-14 | World Cup | Tiszaújváros | 3 |
| 2012 | Olympic Games | London | 13 |
| 2012-03-31 | European Cup | Quarteira | 4 |
| 2012-05-11 | World Triathlon | San Diego | 20 |
| 2012-05-27 | World Triathlon | Madrid | 18 |
| 2012-07-07 | Premium European Cup | Holten | 3 |

DNF = Did not finish

== Personal life ==
In 2003, Abysova married the Russian triathlete and 2008 Olympian Igor Sysoyev. In 2004, she gave birth to a daughter.

== Gallery ==
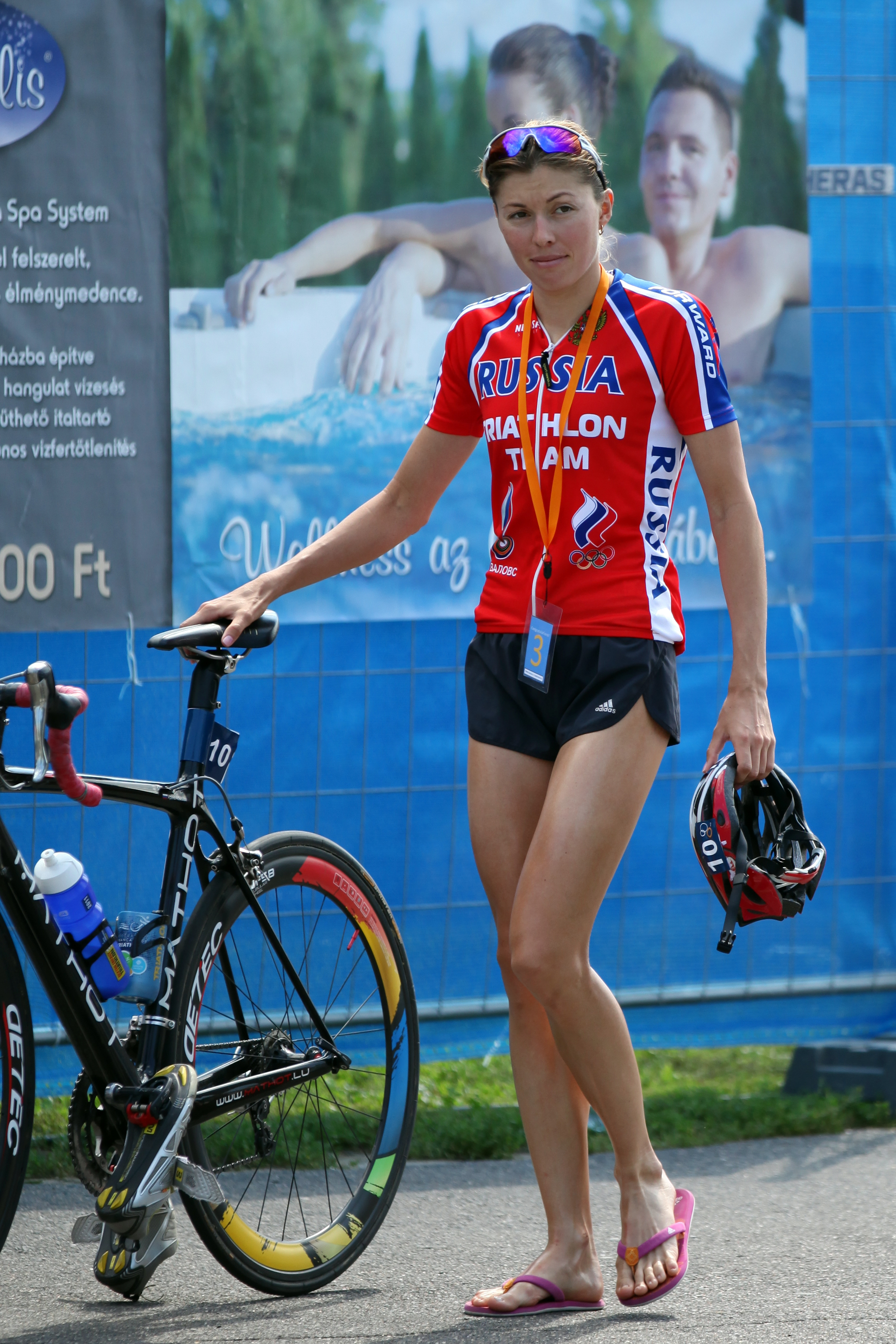
Irina Abysova checking out in Tiszaújváros, 2011.

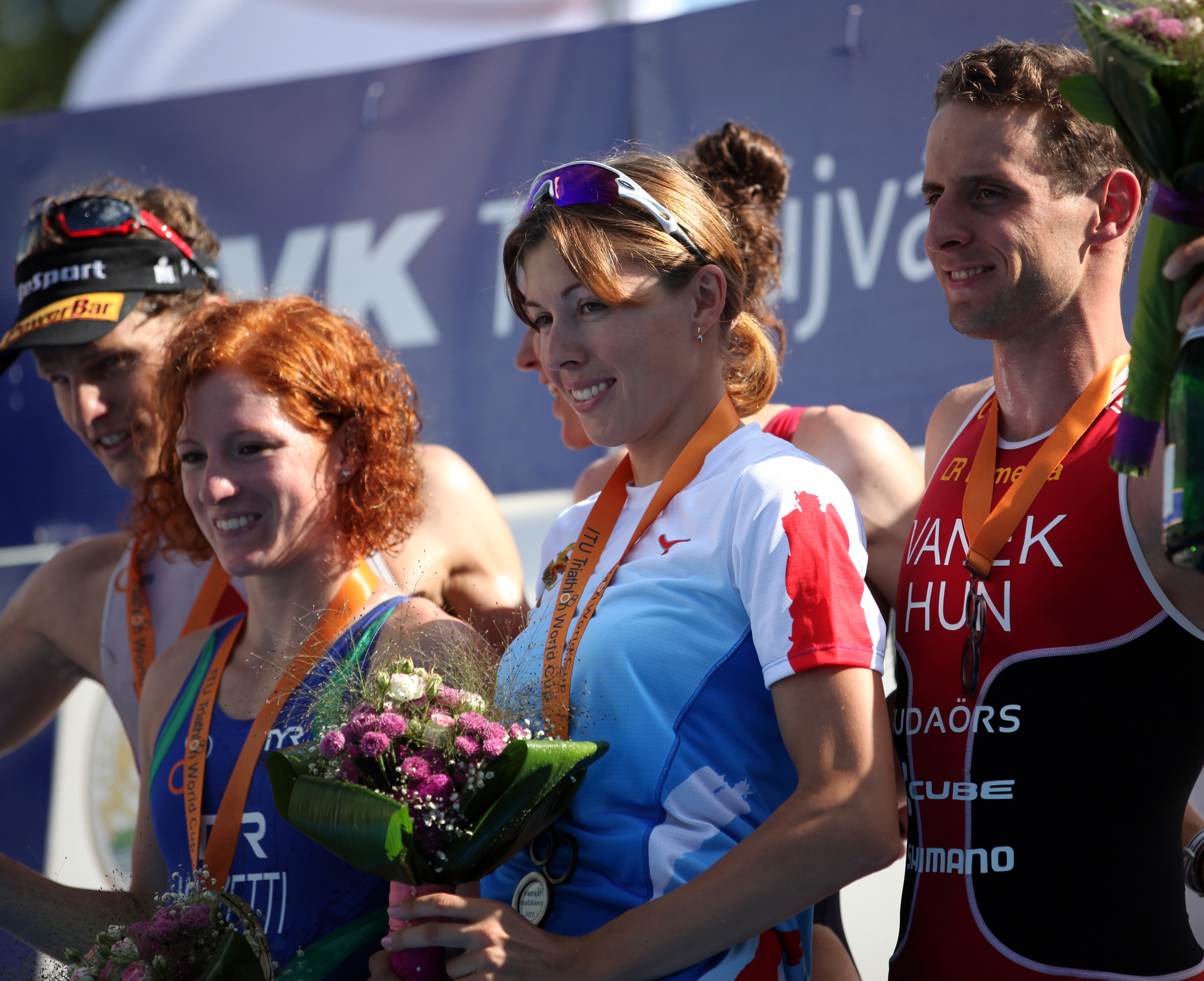
Irina Abysova with her bronze medal in Tiszaújváros, 2011.

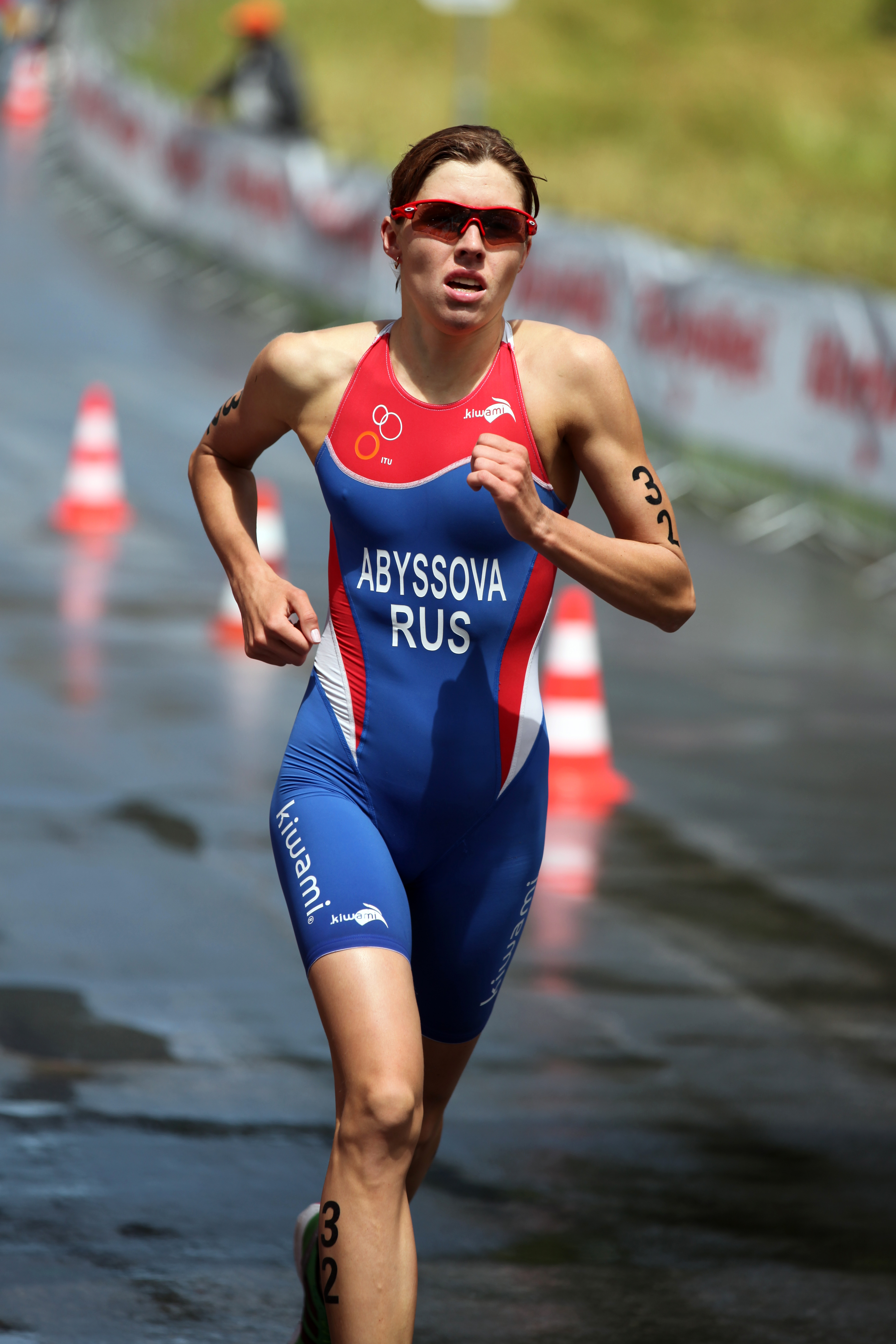
Irina Abysova at the World Championship Series triathlon in Kitzbuhel, 2011.

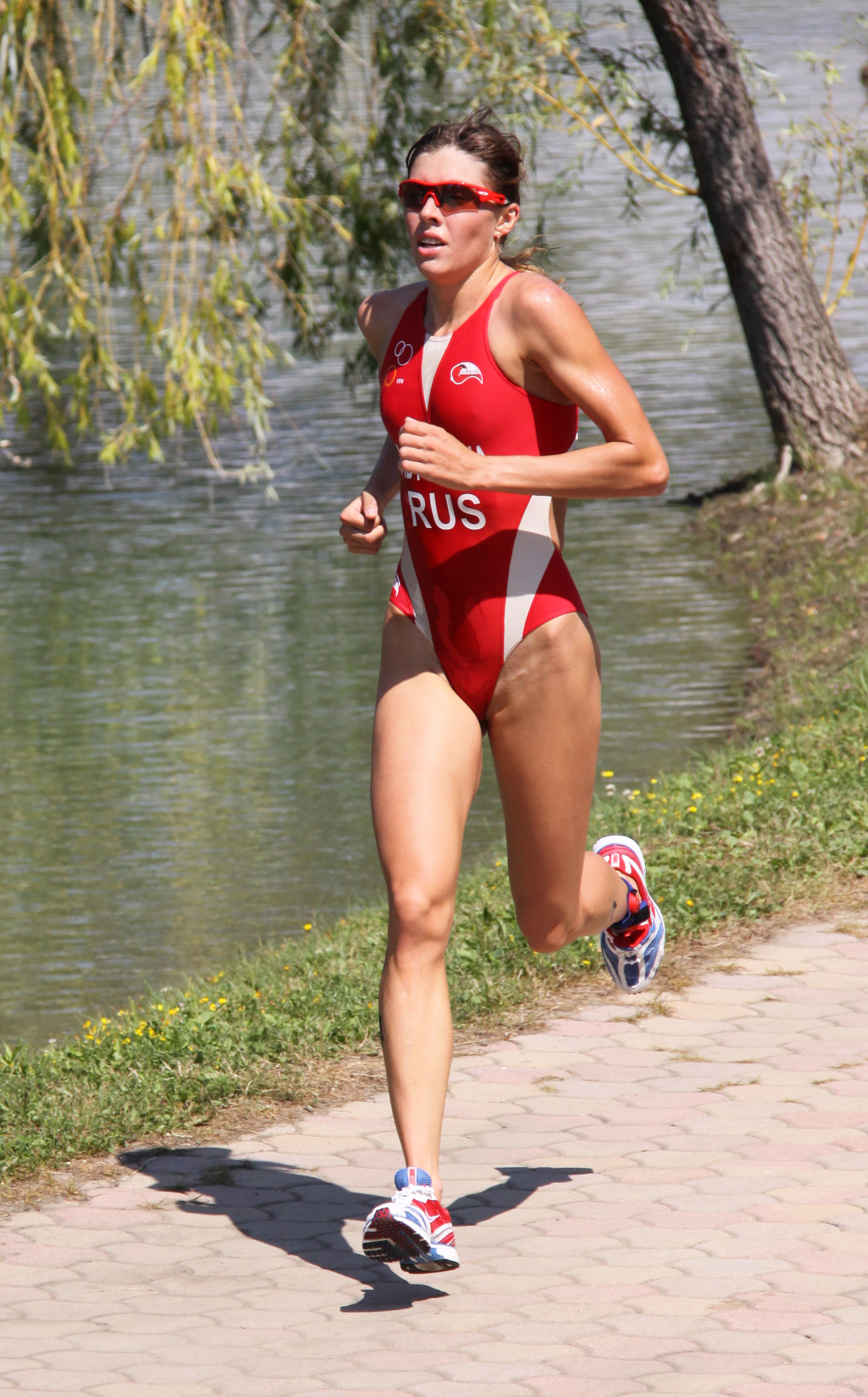
Irina Abysova on her way to the silver medal in Tiszaújváros, 2009.

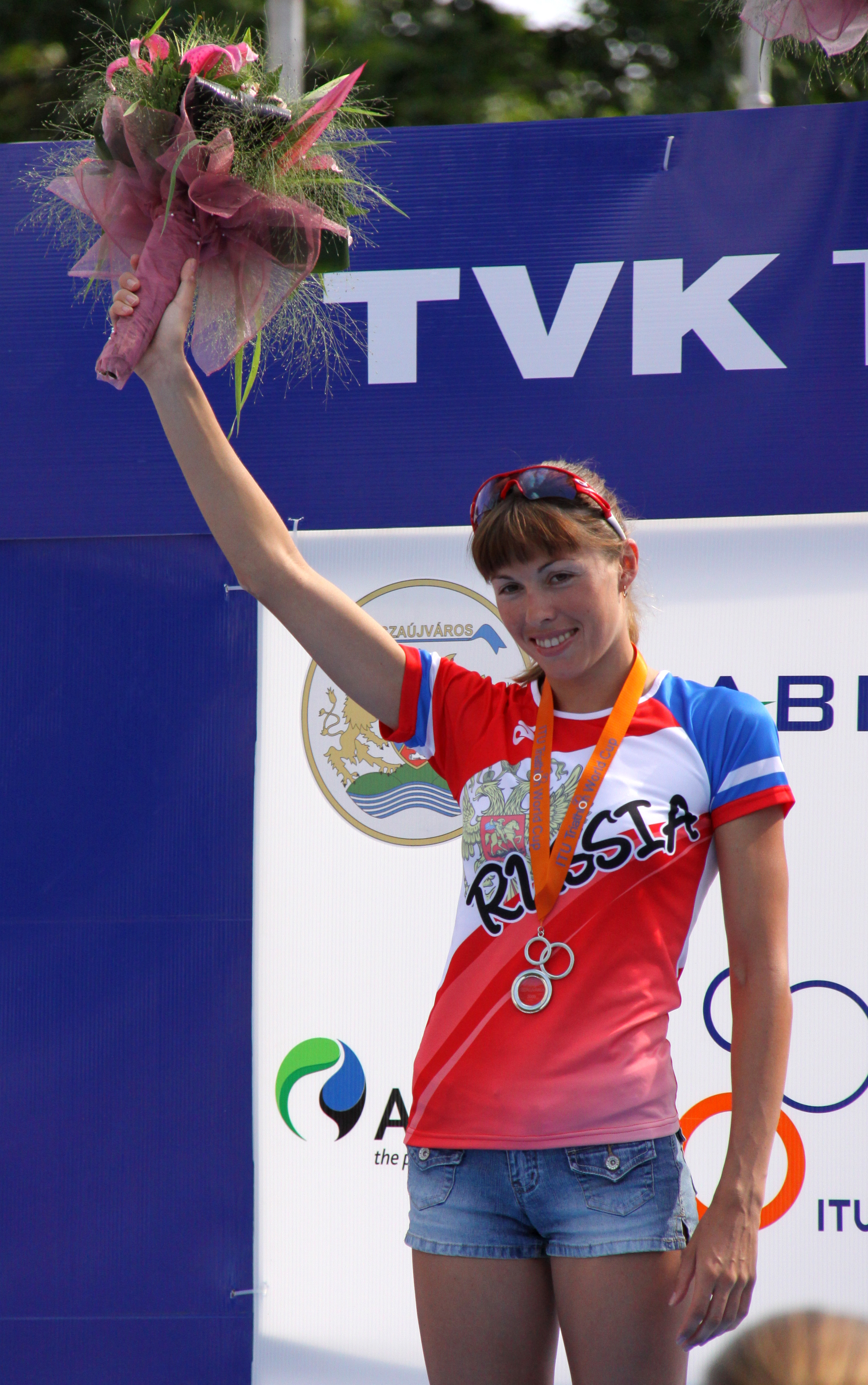
Irina Abysova with her World Cup silver medal in Tiszaújváros, 2009.
