= Yuri Kudinov =

Russian swimmer

Medal record

Men's swimming

Representing Russia

World Championships
Gold medal – first place	2001 Fukuoka	25 km open water
Gold medal – first place	2003 Barcelona	25 km open water
Gold medal – first place	2007 Melbourne	25 km open water

World Open Water Championships
Gold medal – first place	2000 Honolulu	25 km open water
Gold medal – first place	2002 Sharm el-Sheikh	25 km open water
Silver medal – second place	2004 Dubai	25 km open water
Silver medal – second place	2006 Napoli	25 km open water
Bronze medal – third place	2008 Sevilla	25 km open water

European Championships
Gold medal – first place	2002 Berlin	25 km open water

Yuri (Yury) Kudinov (Russian: Юрий Кудинов; born 27 February 1979, in Volgograd) is a long-distance swimmer from Russia.

In 2007 he narrowly missed the world record for the fastest swim across the English Channel when he was beaten by Petar Stoychev. His time of 7 h 6 min remains one of the fastest swims ever recorded, but was not enough to beat Stoychev's 6 h 57 min set on the same day (24 August 2007).

On 25 March 2007, Kudinov beat Stoychev in the 25 km at the Open Water World Championships, a race which he won in a time of 5 h 16 min 45 s, with Stoychev coming in 6th with a time of 5 h 22 min 55 s.

He swam for the Kazakhstan National Team at the 2012 Summer Olympics.

== See also ==
- World Open Water Championships – Multiple medalists
