= Viola Valli =

Italian swimmer (born 1972)

Personal information
- National team: Italy
- Born: 15 May 1972 (age 54) Varese, Italy

Sport
- Sport: Swimming
- Strokes: Long-distance swimming
Medal record
Representing Italy
Event	1st	2nd	3rd
Olympic Games	0	0	0
World Championships	8	3	1
European Championships	1	1	0
Mediterranean Games	0	0	2
Total	9	4	3
Women's Open water
World Championships (individual)
Gold medal – first place	2001 Fukuoka	5 km
Gold medal – first place	2001 Fukuoka	25 km
Gold medal – first place	2002 Sharm el Sheikh	5 km
Gold medal – first place	2003 Barcelona	5 km
Gold medal – first place	2003 Barcelona	10 km
Silver medal – second place	2000 Honolulu	25 km
Silver medal – second place	2002 Sharm el Sheikh	10 km
Bronze medal – third place	2001 Honolulu	5 km
European Championships
Gold medal – first place	2002 Berlin	5 km
Silver medal – second place	1999 Istanbul	5 km
Women's swimming
Mediterranean Games
Bronze medal – third place	1997 Bari	400 m freestyle
Bronze medal – third place	1997 Bari	800 m freestyle

Viola Valli (born 15 May 1972) is a former female open water swimmer from Italy. She is the former world champion at the 5 km, 10 km and 25 km open water distance.

== International medals ==
She won 12 medals (8 individual) at the World Open Water Swimming Championships.

Championship	Edition	5 km	10 km	25 km	Team 5 km	Team 10 km	Team 25 km
World Championships	(United States) 2000 Honolulu	3rd place, bronze medalist(s)		2nd place, silver medalist(s)	1st place, gold medalist(s)		2nd place, silver medalist(s)
World Championships	(Japan) 2001 Fukuoka	1st place, gold medalist(s)		1st place, gold medalist(s)			
World Championships	(Egypt) 2002 Sharm el Sheikh	1st place, gold medalist(s)	2nd place, silver medalist(s)		1st place, gold medalist(s)	1st place, gold medalist(s)	
World Championships	(Spain) 2003 Barcelona	1st place, gold medalist(s)	1st place, gold medalist(s)				
European Championships	(Turkey) 1999 Istanbul	2nd place, silver medalist(s)					
European Championships	(Germany) 2002 Berlin	1st place, gold medalist(s)					

== See also ==
- World Open Water Championships - Multiple medalists
