= Stéphane Gomez =

French swimmer

Personal information
- Nationality: France
- Born: August 2, 1976 (age 49) Millau, France

Sport
- Sport: Swimming
- Strokes: Open Water
- Club: St. Affrique
Medal record
World Championships
| Silver medal – second place | Fukuoka 2001 | 25K |
European Championships
| Bronze medal – third place | Budapest 2006 | 25K |

Stéphane Gomez (born August 2, 1976 in Millau, France) is an open water swimmer from France.

He won the French National Championships in:

- 5K: 2001, 2002
- 10K: 2000, 2002
- 25K: 2007

== See also ==
(in French) Gomez's entry on French Wikipedia.
