= David Meca =

Spanish swimmer

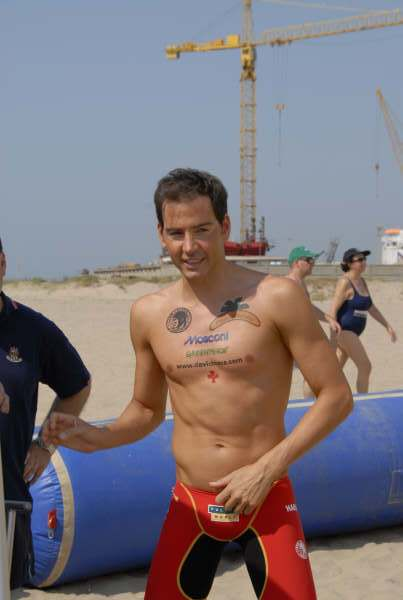

Personal information
- Born: February 1, 1974 (age 52) Sabadell, Spain

Sport
- Sport: Swimming
Medal record
Representing Spain
World Championships
Gold medal – first place	2000 Honolulu	10 km open water
Gold medal – first place	2005 Montreal	25 km open water
Silver medal – second place	1998 Perth	25 km open water
Silver medal – second place	2000 Honolulu	5 km open water
Silver medal – second place	2000 Honolulu	25 km open water
Silver medal – second place	2003 Barcelona	25 km open water
Bronze medal – third place	2003 Barcelona	10 km open water
European Championships
Silver medal – second place	2000 Helsinki	25 km open water
Silver medal – second place	2004 Madrid	25 km open water
Bronze medal – third place	2000 Helsinki	5 km open water
Bronze medal – third place	2002 Berlin	25 km open water

David Meca Medina (born 1 February 1974) is a long distance swimmer from Spain, who has swum from mainland Spain to Ibiza among his exploits. He won gold at the 2005 FINA World Championships in Montreal for the men's open water 25 km.

Meca took silver in the 5 km event at the 2000 World Championships in Hawaii. He also won silver in the 25 km competition and a bronze in the 10 km at the 2003 World Aquatics Championships in Barcelona, Spain.

Meca served a one-year ban on every competition and a four-year ban on championships following a positive test for nandrolone, a banned performance enhancer, in 1999. He was able to participate in World Championships in year 2000 because the sanction had not then been confirmed by the FINA. The sanction that was finally lifted because the swimmer was considered clean, after a long battle to prove his innocence.

It was during the time of this sanction that he started focusing on challenges which nobody had done before. He swam from mainland Spain to Ibiza (about 80 miles or 129 km), in more than 27 hours swimming non-stop; and swam from Alcatraz to mainland San Francisco in less than 3 hours.

Meca successfully swam the English Channel on 10 August 2004 in 7 h 46 mins, and again on 29 August 2005 in 7 h 22 mins.

He swims for the Club Natació Sabadell.

== See also ==
- List of sportspeople sanctioned for doping offences
