= Stéphane Lecat =

French swimmer (born 1971)

Personal information
- Born: August 6, 1971 (age 54) Nogent-sur-Marne, France

Sport
- Sport: Swimming
Medal record
Representing France
World Championships
Bronze medal – third place	2001 Fukuoka	25 km open water
European Championships
Gold medal – first place	2000 Helsinki	25 km open water
Silver medal – second place	1997 Seville	25 km open water
Bronze medal – third place	1995 Vienna	25 km open water

Stéphane Lecat (born August 6, 1971) is a former long-distance swimmer from France. He won a gold medal at the European Championships in the 25 km open water. He successfully swam the English Channel on 23 August 2003 in a time of 8 h 19 mins
