= Edith van Dijk =

Dutch swimmer

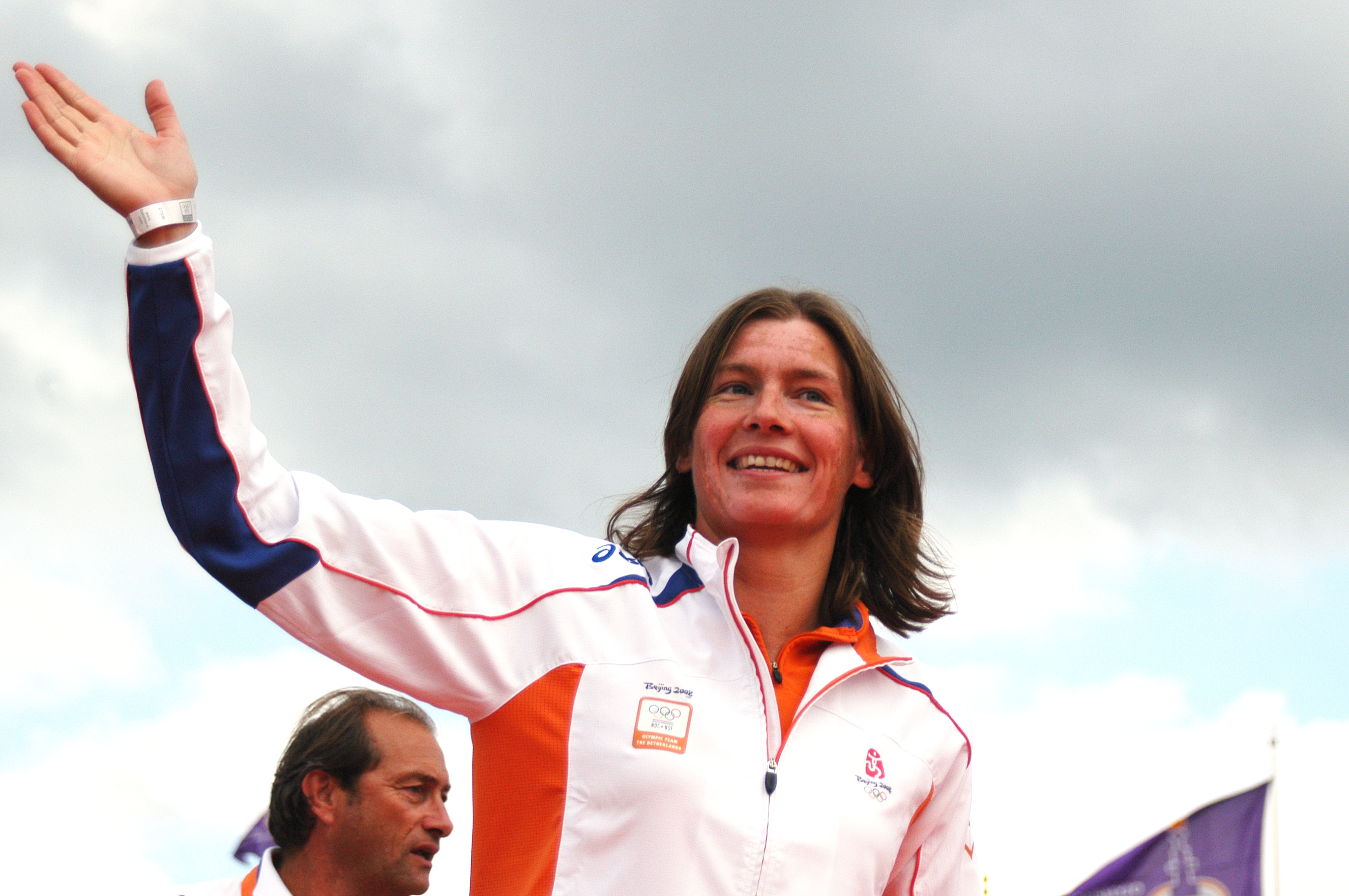

Medal record

Women's Open Water

Representing the Netherlands

World Championships
Gold medal – first place	2003 Barcelona	25 km
Gold medal – first place	2005 Montreal	25 km
Gold medal – first place	2005 Montreal	10 km
Silver medal – second place	1998 Perth	5 km
Silver medal – second place	2001 Fukuoka	25 km
Bronze medal – third place	1998 Perth	25 km
Bronze medal – third place	2001 Fukuoka	10 km
Bronze medal – third place	2003 Barcelona	10 km
Bronze medal – third place	2005 Montreal	5 km

FINA World Open Water Swimming Championships
Gold medal – first place	2000 Honolulu	10 km
Gold medal – first place	2000 Honolulu	25 km
Gold medal – first place	2002 Sharm el-Sheikh	25 km
Silver medal – second place	2002 Sharm el-Sheikh	5 km
Silver medal – second place	2004 Dubai	25 km
Silver medal – second place	2008 Seville	25 km

European Championships
Gold medal – first place	2002 Potsdam	10 km
Gold medal – first place	2002 Potsdam	25 km
Silver medal – second place	1995 Vienna	25 km
Silver medal – second place	2000 Helsinki	25 km

Edith van Dijk (born 6 April 1973 in Haastrecht) is a Dutch swimmer and 6-fold world champion. She is Holland's most successful open water swimmer and long-distance swimmer, whose career started in 1990 taking part in the Dutch IJsselmeermarathon.

== Biography ==
She starts out at Gouda's swimming club DONK, the swimming portion of the soccer team of the same name. At DONK teammates gave her the nickname Piaf, due to her having the same first name as Edith Piaf. She was invested as a Knight of the Order of Orange Nassau and was awarded a Doctorate in Economy from Erasmus University in Rotterdam.

In the years following the 1990 IJsselmeermarathon she finds her place between the world's top. Her definitive breakthrough is during the European championships of 1995 in Vienna, where she wins the silver medal on the longest distance in open water swimming, that of 25 kilometer. The next high is reached in less than three years in Perth, where she wins two medals at the world championships: silver on the 5 kilometer and bronze on the 25 kilometer.

Another two years later, when first separate open water world championships were held off the coast of Hawaii, she hit on the 10 and 25 kilometers. From then on, Van Dijk – living in Wognum and competing for the club SG Hoorn/Zeemacht, always stood on the podium at every major international tournament. In addition to this she also decorated herself with high classifications in the World Cup circuit, including ultra-long races, of more than seventy kilometers in Argentina and Brazil. In 2001, 2002, and 2003 she is nominated for the honor title of Dutch Female Sporter of the Year.

Erica Terpstra, herself a top swimmer, performed the wedding ceremony, wedding Edith with Hans van Goor on 20 March 2003 in Oudewater, Netherlands.

On 13 August 2003 she swam across the English Channel between Calais and Dover. In a time of 9 hours and 8 minutes (official time) she reached the French Coast. She had aimed to improve the official Dutch and European Record by her husband and coach Hans van Goor, who performed the same crossing in 1995 in a time of 8 hours and 2 minutes.

After her Channel-adventure Van Dijk attempted to qualify for the 2004 Summer Olympics in Athens. In spite of her training efforts she did not manage to qualify; she was not fast enough for even the longest distance of pool swimming, the 800 meters freestyle.

In 2005, she decided to end her long and impressive career. She closed it in style: at the world championships of 2005 in Montreal she won the bronze in the 5 kilometers, and gold on both the 10 and 25 kilometers, thereby annoying her everlasting rival from Germany with whom she fought a number of duels, Britta Kamrau. The last race of Holland's most praised marathon swimmer was in December 2005 at the Dutch Short Course Championships (25 meter pool) in Amsterdam.

At the end of 2005, the leading American magazine Swimming World names her long-distance swimmer of the year.

On 22 December 2005 she was elected Sport female of the year 2005. The jury composed of Dutch top athletes chose her instead of judoka Edith Bosch (World and European Champion in 2005) and rower Marit van Eupen (World champion in 2005).

Edith also played a role in the 2006 Argentinian film Agua where she plays herself in a documentary about swimmers, doing an interview about her life as a swimmer.

In August 2007, she announced her comeback, in order to try to win an Olympic medal at the 2008 Summer Olympics. In Beijing, open water swimming featured on the Olympic program for the first time. Despite winning a silver medal in the 25 km at the 2008 world championships three months before the Olympics, she finished only 14th in the Olympic 10 km.

== Personal bests ==
Below is a listing of the top times that Edith achieved in her career. The time format is in hours:minutes:seconds:milliseconds as is common for swimming times. Note that there is a big difference between pool types. Indoor pools of 25 m give the advantage of being able to use the turning point to push off again using ones legs, thus giving a clear advantage over 50 m and of course open water venues. Open sea gives the really bad side effect of large waves and the tides, which will sometimes push the swimmer back to where they came from, this can be clearly seen in the differences in times between the Channel crossing and the almost double in length Maraton Acuatica Rio Coronda which she performed in two hours less.

TIME	DISTANCE	POOLSIZE	DATE	PLACE	EVENT
2:07.16	200 m	25 m	2000	(Netherlands) Nieuwegein	Finals Dutch Championships (short track)
4:19.19	400 m	25 m	2004	(Germany) Berlin	FINA: World Cup No 5 – 2003/2004 Series
8:44.77	800 m	25 m	2004	(Germany) Berlin	FINA: World Cup No 5 – 2003/2004 Series
16:54.09	1500 m	25 m	2005	(Netherlands) Amsterdam	Dutch Short Course Championships
4:20.84	400 m	50 m	2003	(Netherlands) Dordrecht	Finals Dutch Championships
55:46.6	5000 m	open water	2005	(Canada) Montreal	World Aquatics Championships
1:56:00.5	10 km	open water	2005	(Canada) Montreal	World Aquatics Championships
5:25:06.6	25 km	open water	2005	(Canada) Montreal	World Aquatics Championships
9:08:00	34 km	open water	2003	(England) Dover to (France) Calais	English Channel
7:45:00	88 km	down river	2001	Argentina	Maraton Acuatica Rio Coronda

== See also ==
- World Open Water Championships - Multiple medalists

Awards
Preceded by Leontien Zijlaard-van Moorsel	Dutch Sportsman of the Year; 2005	Succeeded by Ireen Wüst
Preceded by None	World Open Water Swimmer of the Year; 2005	Succeeded by Larisa Ilchenko
