= 2006 FINA World Open Water Swimming Championships – Men's 5K =

The Men's 5K race at the 2006 FINA World Open Water Swimming Championships was swum on Tuesday, August 29, 2006 in Naples, Italy. It was the second event of the 2006 Open Water Worlds, and one of two events on August 29 (the other being the Women's 5K race). 30 men were entered in the event, 27 of whom swam.

== Results ==
All times in hour : minutes : seconds

Place	Swimmer	Country	Time	Notes
1	Thomas Lurz	Germany	1:04:32.3	
2	Chip Peterson	USA	1:04:32.7	
3	Simone Ercoli	Italy	1:04:35:9	
4	Andrew Beato	Australia	1:04:36.2	
5	Luca Ferretti	Italy	1:04:38.1	
6	Evgeny Drattsev	Russia	1:04:38.5	
7	Alan Bircher	Great Britain	1:04:40.8	
8	Christian Hein	Germany	1:04:41.6	
9	Josh Santacaterina	Australia	1:04:41.7	
10	Igo Chervyskiy	Ukraine	1:04:42.7	
11	Loic Branda	France	1:04:43.8	
12	Anton Sanachev	Russia	1:04:44.0	
13	Oleksandr Bezuglyy	Ukraine	1:04:44.4	
14	Jarrod Ballen	Canada	1:04:58.9	
15	John Owen	Great Britain	1:05:07.6	
16	Iván López	Mexico	1:05:07.9	
17	Fabio Alves Lima	Brazil	1:05:15.8	
18	Julien Sauvage	France	1:05:18.4	
19	Ricardo Monasterio	Venezuela	1:06:04.9	
20	Csaba Gercsák	Hungary	1:06:08.3	
21	David Creel	Canada	1:06:59.1	
22	Guillherme Bento Bier	Brazil	1:07:12.6	
23	Daniel Delgadillo	Mexico	1:07:55.6	
24	Esteban Enderica	Ecuador	1:09:07.8	
25	Oliver Ptak	Hungary	1:11:51.9	
26	Gabriel Enderica Ochoa	Ecuador	1:11:54.3	
27	Tomislav Soldo	Croatia	1:22:33.1	
--	Rostislav Vitek	Czech Republic	DNS	
--	Dan De Marco	USA	DNS	
--	Daniel Katzir	Israel	DNS	

== See also ==
- 2004 FINA World Open Water Swimming Championships – Men's 5K
- Open water swimming at the 2007 World Aquatics Championships – Men's 5 km
- 2008 FINA World Open Water Swimming Championships – Men's 5K
