= 2006 FINA World Open Water Swimming Championships – Men's 10K =

The Men's 10K race at the 2006 FINA World Open Water Swimming Championships was swum on Thursday, August 31, 2006, in Naples, Italy. It was the third event of the 2006 Open Water Worlds, and one of two events on August 31 (the other being the Women's 10K race). 39 men were entered in the event, 37 of whom swam.

== Results ==
All times in hours : minutes : seconds

Place	Swimmer	Country	Time	Notes
1	Thomas Lurz	Germany	2:10:39.4	
2	Valerio Cleri	Italy	2:10:40.5	
3	Evgeny Drattsev	Russia	2:10:40.7	
4	Andrea Righi	Italy	2:10:42.8	
5	Maarten van der Weijden	Netherlands	2:10:43.8	
6	Chip Peterson	USA	2:10:44.5	
7	Evgeny Koshkarov	Russia	2:10:44.5	
8	Josh Santacaterina	Australia	2:10:45.4	
9	Christian Hein	Germany	2:10:47.5	
10	Stéphane Gomez	France	2:10:48.5	
11	Igor Chervynskiy	Ukraine	2:10:49.3	
12	Alan Bircher	Great Britain	2:10:50.8	
13	Brendan Capell	Australia	2:10:53.1	
14	Shaun Dias	South Africa	2:11:00.5	
15	Mohamed El Zanaty	Egypt	2:11:00.7	
16	Gilles Rondy	France	2:11:01.3	
17	Luiz Eduardo Souza Lima	Brazil	2:11:14.3	
18	Jarrod Ballem	Canada	2:11:37.3	
19	Damián Blaum	Argentina	2:11:57.5	
20	Petar Stoychev	Bulgaria	2:12:09.3	
21	Ricardo Monasterio	Venezuela	2:12:37.6	
22	Allan Lopes Do Carmo	Brazil	2:12:40.1	
23	Csaba Gersak	Hungary	2:13:11.5	
24	Oleksandr Bezuglyy	Ukraine	2:20:55.5	
25	Daniel Katzir	Israel	2:21:12.1	
26	Kane Radford	New Zealand	2:21:15.9	
27	Levente Nagy-Pal	Hungary	2:21:18.2	
28	Gabriel Enderica Ochoa	Ecuador	2:21:25.4	
29	Esteban Enderica	Ecuador	2:23:36.0	
30	Daniel Delgadillo	Mexico	2:24:28.3	
31	Dan De Marco	USA	2:25:57.0	
32	Sho Azuka	Japan	2:26:53.0	
33	Hiroki Takayama	Japan	2:32:45.8	
34	Tomislav Soldo	Croatia	2:39:57.0	
--	David Creel	Canada	DNF	
--	Rostislav Vitek	Czech Republic	DNF	
--	Kenneth Smith	South Africa	DNF	
--	Ivan López	Mexico	DNS	
--	Mohammad Saleh	Syria	DNS	

== See also ==
- 2004 FINA World Open Water Swimming Championships – Men's 10K
- Open water swimming at the 2007 World Aquatics Championships – Men's 10 km
- 2008 FINA World Open Water Swimming Championships – Men's 10K
