= Open water swimming at the 2007 World Aquatics Championships =

- Host city: Melbourne, Australia
- Date: 18-25 March
- Venue: St. Kilda Beach
- Events: 6

The open water swimming events at the 2007 World Aquatics Championships were held from 18 to 25 March, at St. Kilda Beach near Melbourne, Australia.

== Medal table ==
Rank	Nation	Gold	Silver	Bronze	Total
1	Russia (RUS)	4	2	2	8
2	Germany (GER)	2	1	0	3
3	Great Britain (GBR)	0	1	0	1
3	Italy (ITA)	0	1	0	1
3	United States (USA)	0	1	0	1
6	Australia (AUS)	0	0	2	2
7	Egypt (EGY)	0	0	1	1
7	Greece (GRE)	0	0	1	1
Totals (8 entries)		6	6	6	18

- Record(*)

== Medal summary ==
=== Men ===
Event	Gold	Silver	Bronze
5 km details	Thomas Lurz (GER); 56:49.6	Evgeny Drattsev (RUS); 56:50.7	Spyridon Gianniotis (GRE); 56:56.6
10 km details	Vladimir Dyatchin (RUS); 1:55:32.52	Thomas Lurz (GER); 1:55:32.58	Evgeny Drattsev (RUS); 1:55:47.31
25 km details	Yuri Kudinov (RUS); 5:16:45.55	Marco Formentini (ITA); 5:18:36.80	Mohamed Zanaty (EGY); 5:19:23.23

=== Women ===
Event	Gold	Silver	Bronze
5 km details	Larisa Ilchenko (RUS); 1:00:41.3	Ekaterina Seliverstova (RUS); 1:00:43.6	Kate Brookes-Peterson (AUS); 1:00:47.6
10 km details	Larisa Ilchenko (RUS); 2:03:57.9	Cassandra Patten (GBR); 2:03:58.9	Kate Brookes-Peterson (AUS); 2:03:59.5
25 km details	Britta Kamrau (GER); 5:37:11.66	Kalyn Keller (USA); 5:39:39.62	Ksenia Popova (RUS); 5:39:51.51

== See also ==
- Open water swimming at the 2005 World Aquatics Championships
- 2008 FINA World Open Water Championships
- Swimming at the 2008 Summer Olympics
- Open water swimming at the 2009 World Aquatics Championships
