= Open water swimming at the 2009 World Aquatics Championships – Men's 5 km =

Men's 5 km at the 2009 World Aquatics Championships
- Location: Rome
- Dates: 21 July
- Competitors: 41 from 24 nations

The men's 5 km race at the 2009 World Championships occurred on Tuesday, 21 July at Ostia Beach in Rome, Italy. In total, 41 participants from 24 countries competed in the race.

Note: The women's and men's 5 km races at the 2009 Worlds were originally scheduled to be held on Sunday, July 19; however, high wind and surf conditions on-course caused the FINA Bureau to postpone the race until July 21.

== Results ==
Rank	Swimmer	Nationality	Time
1st place, gold medalist(s)	Thomas Lurz	Germany	56:26.9
2nd place, silver medalist(s)	Spyridon Gianniotis	Greece	56:27.2
3rd place, bronze medalist(s)	Chad Ho	South Africa	56:41.9
4	Luca Ferretti	Italy	56:44.3
5	Andrew Gemmell	USA	56:44.9
6	Loic Branda	France	56:47.0
7	Fran Crippen	USA	56:47.1
8	Diego Nogueira Montero	Spain	56:47.2
9	Simone Ruffini	Italy	56:47.3
10	Francisco Hervás	Spain	56:47.9
10	Vladimir Dyatchin	Russia	56:47.9
12	Evgeny Drattsev	Russia	56:48.5
13	Andrew Beato	Australia	56:52.4
14	Rodrigo Elorza	Mexico	56:55.3
15	Csaba Gercsák	Hungary	57:07.1
16	Trent Grimsey	Australia	57:07.2
17	Jan Posmourny	Czech Republic	57:07.8
18	Julien Sauvage	France	57:09.6
19	Luiz Eduardo Lima	Brazil	57:11.1
20	Jakub Fichtl	Czech Republic	57:21.1
21	Jan Wolfgarten	Germany	57:31.7
22	David Creel	Canada	57:37.1
23	Konstiantyn Ukradyga	Ukraine	57:48.8
24	Richard Charlesworth	Great Britain	57:57.4
25	Igor Snitko	Ukraine	57:58.1
26	Luis Rogerio Arapiraca	Brazil	58:04.9
27	Daniel Viegas	Portugal	58:05.0
28	Daniel Delgadillo	Mexico	58:17.7
29	Kurt Niehaus	Costa Rica	58:17.8
30	Esteban Enderica	Ecuador	58:17.9
31	Gergely Gyurta	Hungary	58:20.8
32	Daniel Marais	South Africa	58:21.9
33	Alfie Howes	Great Britain	59:36.8
34	Ivan Enderica	Ecuador	59:40.1
35	Yvan Hernandez	Venezuela	1:01:53.9
36	Angel Moreira	Venezuela	1:01:57.1
37	Thomas Vachan	Slovakia	1:02:06.8
38	Juan Prem Biere	Guatemala	1:07:45.3
39	Mohammed Jassim Alghareeb	Saudi Arabia	1:07:49.8
--	Orel Jeffrey	Netherlands Antilles	OTL
--	Kareem Valentine	Netherlands Antilles	OTL

Key: OTL = Outside time limit

== See also ==
- Open water swimming at the 2007 World Aquatics Championships – Men's 5 km
