= 2006 FINA World Open Water Swimming Championships – Men's 25K =

The Men's 25K race at the 2006 FINA World Open Water Swimming Championships was swum on Sunday, September 3, 2006 in Naples, Italy. It was the sixth and final event of the 2006 Open Water Worlds. 16 males were entered in the event, 15 of whom swam.

== Results ==
All times in hours : minutes : seconds

Place	Swimmer	Country	Time	Notes
1	Josh Santacaterina	Australia	5:47:34.1	
2	Yuri Kudinov	Russia	5:48:56.9	
3	Petar Stoychev	Bulgaria	5:49:00.2	
4	Andrea Volpini	Italy	5:49:05.9	
5	Mohamed El Zanaty	Egypt	5:49:40.7	
6	Maarten van der Weijden	Netherlands	5:53:10.1	
7	Stéphane Gomez	France	5:55:49.0	
8	Gilles Rondy	France	5:58:41.5	
9	Rostislav Vitek	Czech Republic	6:00:16.9	
10	Claudio Gargaro	Italy	6:01:51.7	
11	Anton Sanachev	Russia	6:04:30.6	
12	Ivan López	Mexico	6:13:53.1	
13	Mihajlo Ristovski	(North Macedonia) Macedonia	6:21:22.4	
14	Mohammad Saleh	Syria	6:39:33.6	
--	Daniel Delgadillo	Mexico	DNF	
--	Brendan Capell	Australia	DNS	

== See also ==
- 2004 FINA World Open Water Swimming Championships – Men's 25K
- Open water swimming at the 2007 World Aquatics Championships – Men's 25 km
- 2008 FINA World Open Water Swimming Championships – Men's 25K
