= Open water swimming at the 2007 World Aquatics Championships – Men's 10 km =

Men's 10 km at the 2007 World Aquatics Championships
- Venue: St Kilda Beach
- Location: Melbourne
- Dates: 21 March

The Men's 10 km Open Water event at the 2007 World Aquatics Championships was held on 21 March 2007 at St Kilda beach.

== Result ==
Rank	Name	Country	Time	Pts
1	Vladimir Dyatchin	Russia	1:55:32.52	18
2	Thomas Lurz	Germany	1:55:32.58	16
3	Evgeny Drattsev	Russia	1:55:47.31	14
4	Mohamed Zanaty	Egypt	1:55:47.83	12
5	Christian Hein	Germany	1:55:49.43	10
6	Brian Ryckeman	Belgium	1:55:50.40	8
7	Maarten van der Weijden	Netherlands	1:55:51.91	6
8	Alan Bircher	Great Britain	1:55:53.91	5
9	Diego Nogueira Montero	Spain	1:55:56.58	4
10	Csaba Gercsák	Hungary	1:55:59.96	3
11	Rostislav Vitek	Czech Republic	1:56:01.76	2
12	Petar Stoychev	Bulgaria	1:56:02.93	1
13	Josh Santacaterina	Australia	1:56:04.45	
14	Alex Schelvis	Netherlands	1:56:06.33	
15	Valerio Cleri	Italy	1:56:08.18	
16	Jakub Fichtl	Czech Republic	1:56:08.70	
17	Allan do Carmo	Brazil	1:56:12.02	
18	Stéphane Gomez	France	1:56:12.10	
19	Igr Chervynskiy	Ukraine	1:56:14.36	
20	Mark Warkentin	United States	1:56:15.28	
21	Ricardo Monasterio	Venezuela	1:56:15.38	
22	Ky Hurst	Australia	1:56:17.62	
23	Andrea Righi	Italy	1:56:23.55	
24	Balázs Gercsák	Hungary	1:56:28.26	
25	David Creel	Canada	1:56:41.89	
26	Francisco Hervás	Spain	1:56:58.61	
27	Daniel Katzir	Israel	1:57:37.90	
28	Tihomir Ivanchev	Bulgaria	1:57:44.89	
29	Gilles Rondy	France	1:58:41.48	
30	Li Yinhan	China	1:58:41.55	
31	Spyridon Gianniotis	Greece	1:58:42.68	
32	Luis Escobar	Mexico	1:59:17.21	
33	Scott Kaufmann	United States	2:00:40.02	
34	Fábio Lima	Brazil	2:01:27.06	
35	Zu Lijun	China	2:01:32.66	
36	Kane Radford	New Zealand	2:01:36.82	
37	Manuel Chiu	Mexico	2:05:29.62	
38	Kurt Niehaus	Costa Rica	2:06:15.46	
39	Philippe Dubreuil	Canada	2:07:40.53	
40	Mihajlo Ristovski	Macedonia	2:07:42.75	
41	Oleksandr Bezuglyy	Ukraine	2:09:44.23	
42	Kamel Contreras	Dominican Republic	2:14:15.50	
43	Gabriel Ochoa	Ecuador	2:14:48.74	
	Elgun Babayev	Azerbaijan	OTL	
	Marin Lazariä	Croatia	OTL	
	Juan Rodolfo Prem Biere	Guatemala	OTL	
	Bernard Ray Atsu Blewudzi	Ghana	OTL	
	Roberto Garcia	Chile	DNF	
	Esteban Enderica Salgado	Ecuador	DNF	
	Adu Opanka Okai	Ghana	DNF	
	Jackson Niyomugabo	Rwanda	DNF	
	Erwin Maldonado Saavedra	Venezuela	DNF	
	Seraj Mouloud	Libya	DNF	
	Williams Malique	Antigua and Barbuda	DNS	
