= Open water swimming at the 2005 World Aquatics Championships – Men's 10 km =

Men's 10 kilometre at the 2005 FINA World Championships
- Venue: Notre Dame Island
- Dates: 20 July 2005
- Winning time: 1 hour 46 minutes 38.1 seconds

Medalists
gold medal	Chip Peterson	United States
silver medal	Thomas Lurz	Germany
bronze medal	Petar Stoychev	Bulgaria

The men's 10 km race at the 2005 World Championships occurred on July 20.

== Results ==
Rank	Swimmer	Nationality	Time
1st place, gold medalist(s)	Chip Peterson	United States	1:46:38.1
2nd place, silver medalist(s)	Thomas Lurz	Germany	1:46:45.2
3rd place, bronze medalist(s)	Petar Stoychev	Bulgaria	1:46:50.4
4	Rondy Gilles	France	1:47:04.9
5	Maarten van der Weijden	Netherlands	1:47:07.4
6	Fabio Venturini	Italy	1:47:09.7
7	Diego Nogueira	Spain	1:47:10.8
8	Brendan Capell	Australia	1:47:11.2
9	Evgeny Drattsev	Russia	1:47:13.3
10	Toni Franz	Germany	1:47:32.5
11	Jarrod Ballem	Canada	1:47:39.5
12	Csaba Gercsák	Hungary	1:47:41.1
13	Mohamed Elzanaty	Egypt	1:47:41.5
14	Josh Santacarerina	Australia	1:47:47.2
15	Bertrand Venturi	France	1:47:54.1
16	Elliot Rushton	Canada	1:47:55.6
17	John Kenny	United States	1:47:55.6
18	Guilherme Bier	Brazil	1:48:15.8
19	Damián Blaum	Argentina	1:48:38.5
20	Francisco Jose Hervas	Spain	1:49:03.2
21	Daniil Serebrennikov	Russia	1:49:33.7
22	Luca Ferretti	Italy	1:53:40.6
23	Gabriel Villagoiz	Argentina	1:53:44.1
24	Kurt Niehaus	Costa Rica	1:55:45.9
25	Rolando Salas	Venezuela	1:57:16.6
26	Johndry Segovia	Venezuela	1:57:16.7
27	Luis Oliveira	Brazil	1:58:41.9
28	Santiago Enderica Salgado	Ecuador	1:59:36.7
29	Kenneth Smith	South Africa	2:00:18.6
30	Gabriel Enderica Ochoa	Ecuador	2:01:04.9
31	Tyron Venter	South Africa	2:05:51.8
	Stjepan Ptucar	Croatia	DNS
	Alan Bircher	Great Britain	DNS
	Jane Karajovanov	Macedonia	DNS

Key: DNS = Did not start
