= 2006 FINA World Open Water Swimming Championships – Women's 25K =

The Women's 25K race at the 2006 FINA World Open Water Swimming Championships was swum on Saturday, September 2, 2006 in Naples, Italy. It was the fifth event of the 2006 Open Water Worlds. 13 females were entered in the event, 12 of whom swam.

== Results ==
All times in hours : minutes : seconds

Place	Swimmer	Country	Time	Notes
1	Angela Maurer	Germany	6:22:46.9	
2	Natalia Pankina	Russia	6:22:47.8	
3	Ksenia Popova	Russia	6:22:51.3	
4	Erica Rose	USA	6:24:13.7	
5	Stefanie Biller	Germany	6:24:18.5	
6	Alessandra Romiti	Italy	6:24:28.7	
7	Trudee Hutchinson	Australia	6:26:59.8	
8	Shelley Clark	Australia	6:42:40.5	
9	Nika Kozamernik	Slovenia	6:43:37.3	
10	Claire Hawley	USA	6:54:49.6	
--	Floriane Richard	France	DNF	
--	Laura La Piana	Italy	DNF	
--	Migmari Calderon	Cuba	DNS	

== See also ==
- 2004 FINA World Open Water Swimming Championships – Women's 25K
- Open water swimming at the 2007 World Aquatics Championships – Women's 25 km
- 2008 FINA World Open Water Swimming Championships – Women's 25K
