= Open water swimming at the 2007 World Aquatics Championships – Men's 25 km =

Men's 25 km at the 2007 World Aquatics Championships
- Venue: St Kilda Beach
- Location: Melbourne
- Dates: 25 March

The Men's 25 km Open Water event at the 2007 World Aquatics Championships was held on 25 March 2007 at St Kilda beach.

== Result ==
Results of the men's 25 km open water swimming
#	Name	Country	Time	Pts
1	Yuri Kudinov	Russia	5:16:45.55	18
2	Marco Formentini	Italy	5:18:36.80	16
3	Mohamed Zanaty	Egypt	5:19:23.23	14
4	Mark Warkentin	United States	5:20:42.01	12
5	Josh Santacaterina	Australia	5:20:55.89	10
6	Petar Stoychev	Bulgaria	5:22:55.82	8
7	Andrea Volpini	Italy	5:24:10.62	6
8	Stéphane Gomez	France	5:25:02.19	5
9	Anton Sanachev	Russia	5:28:34.29	4
10	Sebastiaan Reijnen	Netherlands	5:31:27.02	3
11	Brendan Capell	Australia	5:32:41.97	2
12	Rostislav Vitek	Czech Republic	5:32:43.78	1
13	Damián Blaum	Argentina	5:32:48.18	
14	Gilles Rondy	France	5:54:19.54	
15	Tihomir Ivanchev	Bulgaria	5:56:35.41	
16	Scott Kaufmann	United States	6:05:26.82	
	Toni Franz	Germany	DNF	
	Daniel Katzir	Israel	DNF	
	Maarten van der Weijden	Netherlands	DNF	
	Mihajlo Ristovski	Macedonia	DNF	
	David Meca Medina	Spain	DNS	
