= Luis Escobar (swimmer) =

Mexican swimmer (born 1984)

Personal information
- Full name: Luis Ricardo Escobar Torres
- Nationality: Mexico
- Born: 19 October 1984 (age 41) Celaya, Guanajuato, Mexico
- Height: 1.86 m (6 ft 1 in)
- Weight: 82 kg (181 lb)

Sport
- Sport: Swimming
- Event: Open water marathon

Luis Ricardo Escobar Torres (born October 19, 1984, in Celaya, Guanajuato) is a Mexican swimmer who specialized in open water marathon. In 2010, Escobar became the first ever swimmer to claim an open water swimming title at the Mexican National Championships in Puerto Vallarta, clocking at 2 hours, 11 minutes, and 23.25 seconds. He is also the older brother of Susana Escobar, a long-distance freestyle swimmer, a two-time Olympian, and a member of the swimming team for the Texas Longhorns.

Escobar qualified for the 2008 Summer Olympics in Beijing, after placing fourteenth and receiving a continental spot from the FINA World Open Water Swimming Championships in Seville, Spain. He swam in the first ever men's 10 km open water marathon, against a field of 24 other competitors, including former pool swimmers Petar Stoychev of Bulgaria and Thomas Lurz of Germany. Escobar finished the race in eighteenth place, with a time of 1:53:47.9, one minute and fifty-six seconds (1:56) behind winner Maarten van der Weijden of the Netherlands.
