= 2006 FINA World Open Water Swimming Championships – Women's 5K =

The Women's 5K race at the 2006 FINA World Open Water Swimming Championships was swum on Tuesday, August 29, 2006 in Naples, Italy. It was the first event of the 2006 Open Water Worlds, and one of two events on August 29 (the other being the men's 5K race). 27 women swam the event.

== Results ==
All times in hour : minutes : seconds

Place	Swimmer	Country	Time	Notes
1	Larisa Ilchenko	Russia	1:08:19.7	
2	Poliana Okimoto	Brazil	1:08:27.6	
3	Britta Kamrau-Corestein	Germany	1:08:46.3	
4	Kirsten Groome	USA	1:08.47.0	
5	Jana Pechanová	Czech Republic	1:08.50.7	
6	Kate Brookes-Peterson	Australia	1:08:59.8	
7	Ekaterina Seliverstova	Russia	1:09:03.2	
8	Martina Grimaldi	Italy	1:09:06.7	
9	Alessia Paoloni	Italy	1:09.10.8	
10	Cassandra Patten	Great Britain	1:10.11.0	
11	Natalya Samorodina	Ukraine	1:10:15.7	
12	Brittany Massengale	USA	1:12:45.4	
13	Nika Kozamernik	Slovenia	1:13:06.2	
14	Celeste Punet	Argentina	1:13:09.8	
15	Shelley Clark	Australia	1:13:12.8	
16	Tanya Hunks	Canada	1:13:20.6	
17	Philippa Davis	Great Britain	1:13:25.4	
18	Svitlana Rastoropova	Ukraine	1:13:29.2	
19	Karley Stutzel	Canada	1:13:34.7	
20	Maria Da Penha Cruz	Brazil	1:14:17.5	
21	Asmaa Katarya	Egypt	1:14:51.9	
22	Nataly Caldas Calle	Ecuador	1:15:12.8	
23	Mara Serrano Cabrera	Ecuador	1:16:56.3	
24	Sahema Mubarak	Egypt	1:17:03.7	
25	Sandra Alanis	Mexico	1:18:18.3	
26	Anja Trisic	Croatia	1:22:12.8	
27	Ana Bucovac	Croatia	1:31:43.3	

== See also ==
- 2004 FINA World Open Water Swimming Championships – Women's 5K
- Open water swimming at the 2007 World Aquatics Championships – Women's 5 km
- 2008 FINA World Open Water Swimming Championships – Women's 5K
