= 2006 FINA World Open Water Swimming Championships – Women's 10K =

The Women's 10K race at the 2006 FINA World Open Water Swimming Championships was swum on Thursday, August 31, 2006, in Naples, Italy. It was the fourth event of the 2006 Open Water Worlds, and one of two events on August 31 (the other being the Men's 10K race). 31 females were entered in the event, 28 of whom swam.

== Results ==
All times in hours : minutes : seconds

| Place | Swimmer | Country | Time | Notes |
|---|---|---|---|---|
| 1 | Larisa Ilchenko | Russia | 2:19:49.9 | |
| 2 | Poliana Okimoto | Brazil | 2:19:59.3 | |
| 3 | Ksenia Popova | Russia | 2:19:59.8 | |
| 4 | Angela Maurer | Germany | 2:20:00.2 | |
| 5 | Trudee Hutchinson | Australia | 2:20:09.0 | |
| 6 | Jana Pechanová | Czech Republic | 2:20:22.4 | |
| 7 | Cassandra Patten | Great Britain | 2:20:24.1 | |
| 8 | Kate Brookes-Peterson | Australia | 2:20:31.1 | |
| 9 | Laura La Piana | Italy | 2:20:32.1 | |
| 10 | Erica Rose | USA | 2:20:34.4 | |
| 11 | Ana Marcela Da Cruz | Brazil | 2:20:56.5 | |
| 12 | Natalya Samorodina | Ukraine | 2:20:59.3 | |
| 13 | Isobel Newman | Great Britain | 2:24:29.3 | |
| 14 | Celeste Punet | Argentina | 2:24:45.6 | |
| 15 | Federica Vitale | Italy | 2:24:49.7 | |
| 16 | Katherine Ball | USA | 2:26:10.7 | |
| 17 | Karley Stutzel | Canada | 2:30:13.2 | |
| 18 | Kataly Caldas Calle | Ecuador | 2:32:23.8 | |
| 19 | Maria Serrano Cabrera | Ecuador | 2:32:26.3 | |
| 20 | Asmaa Katarya | Egypt | 2:33:04.7 | |
| 21 | Svitlana Rastoropova | Ukraine | 2:33:37.4 | |
| 22 | Sandra Alanis | Mexico | 2:35:57.2 | |
| 23 | Sahema Mubarak | Egypt | 2:36:16.2 | |
| 24 | Kylie Salt | New Zealand | 2:36:29.0 | |
| 25 | Migmari Calderon | Cuba | 2:38:50.1 | |
| 26 | Karla Šitić | Croatia | 2:39:17.5 | |
| 27 | Kirsten Cameron | New Zealand | 2:44:18.1 | |
| -- | Darjia Pop | Serbia and Montenegro | DNF | |
| -- | Cindy Toscano | Guatemala | DNS | |
| -- | Tanya Hunks | Canada | DNS | |
| -- | Floriane Richard | France | DNS | |

== See also ==
- 2004 FINA World Open Water Swimming Championships – Women's 10K
- Open water swimming at the 2007 World Aquatics Championships – Women's 10 km
- 2008 FINA World Open Water Swimming Championships – Women's 10K
