= Marco Formentini =

Marco Formentini may refer to:

- Marco Formentini (politician) (1930–2021), Italian politician
- Marco Formentini (swimmer) (born 1970), Italian swimmer
