= Kane Radford =

New Zealand swimmer

Personal information
- Born: 2 November 1990 (age 36) Rotorua, New Zealand
- Height: 1.75 m (5 ft 9 in)
- Weight: 79 kg (174 lb)

Sport
- Country: New Zealand
- Sport: Swimming

Achievements and titles
- National finals: Open water 5 km champion (2012, 2013, 2014, 2015, 2016); Open water 10 km champion (2012, 2013, 2014, 2015, 2016)

Kane Radford (born 2 November 1990) is a New Zealand swimmer. He is New Zealand's first Olympic open water swimmer.

== Early life ==
Born in Rotorua on 2 November 1990, Radford was educated at John Paul College in Rotorua. Of Māori descent, Radford affiliates to Ngāti Tūwharetoa and Te Arawa.

== Swimming career ==
Radford won gold at the 2006 Oceania Swimming Championships in the men's 10 km open water race. On 31 August 2006 he placed 26th in the men's 10km race, at the 2006 FINA World Open Water Swimming Championships.

At the 2007 World Aquatics Championships he competed in both the 5 and 10km races, placing 22nd and 26th respectively.

At the 2008 Oceania Swimming Championships, Radford came second in the men's 1500m, 5 km and 10 km races.

He was part of the New Zealand team at the 2011 World Aquatics Championships, where he came 27th in the men's 5km open water race.

He again represented New Zealand at the 2013 World Aquatics Championships, coming 18th in the men's 5km and 20th in the men's 10km. He was also part of a three-man team that placed 10th in the open water team event.

Radford placed third in the men's 10 km open water race at the 2014 Pan Pacific Swimming Championships.

He again competed for New Zealand at the 2015 World Aquatics Championships, placing 30th in the men's 10km open water race.

He qualified for the 2016 summer Olympics as Oceania's top-ranked representative outside the world's top ten of the men's 10 km marathon at the World Olympic Qualifier in Setubal, Portugal. However he was not named to the New Zealand Olympic team by Swimming New Zealand. On 27 June 2016, Radford was nominated to the NZOC, following his successful appeal to the New Zealand Sport Tribunal. Radford placed 19th in the 2016 Olympic marathon event, 19 seconds behind the winner, Ferry Weertman.

Radford trained at Claremont Aquatic Centre in Perth in Western Australia.
