= 2004 FINA World Open Water Swimming Championships =

The 3rd FINA Open Water Swimming World Championships were held November 26 – December 2, 2004 in Dubai, United Arab Emirates. The championships featured 90 swimmers from 26 countries competing in six races:

- 5-kilometer (5K) – Men's and Women's
- 10-kilometer (10K) – Men's and Women's
- 25-kilometer (25K) – Men's and Women's

== Results ==
Event	Gold		Silver		Bronze	
Women's 5K details	Larisa Ilchenko; Russia	1:03:11.9	Ksenia Popova; Russia	1:03:43.8	Sara McLarty (United States) USA	1:03:52.9
Men's 5K details	Grant Cleland; Australia	56:52.9	Christian Hein; Germany	56:54.1	Josh Santacaterina; Australia	56:55.5
Women's 10K details	Britta Kamrau; Germany	2:07:51.7	Jana Pechanová; Czech Republic	2:07:52.8	Lauren Arndt; Australia	2:07:53.5
Men's 10K details	Thomas Lurz; Germany	1:54:38.0	Alan Bircher (United Kingdom) Great Britain	1:54:44.8	Danill Serebrennikov; Russia	1:55:02.8
Women's 25K details	Britta Kamrau; Germany	5:43:09.6	Edith van Dijk; Netherlands	5:43:09.7	Natalia Pankina; Russia	5:43:14.4
Men's 25K details	Brendan Capell; Australia	5:05:39.6	Yuri Kudinov; Russia	5:07:05.2	Evgueni Kochkarov; Russia	5:07:59.7

== Team medals ==
Event	Gold	Silver	Bronze
5K	Germany (GER)	Australia (AUS)	Russia (RUS)
10K	Germany (GER)	Russia (RUS)	Australia (AUS)

== See also ==
- 2002 FINA World Open Water Swimming Championships
- 2006 FINA World Open Water Swimming Championships
