= Open water swimming at the 2007 World Aquatics Championships – Men's 5 km =

Men's 5 km at the 2007 World Aquatics Championships
- Venue: St Kilda Beach
- Location: Melbourne
- Dates: 18 March

The Men's 5 km Open Water event at the 2007 World Aquatics Championships was held on 18 March 2007 at St Kilda beach.

== Result ==
#	Name	Country	Time	Pts
1	Thomas Lurz	Germany	56:49.6	18
2	Evgeny Drattsev	Russia	56:50.7	16
3	Spyridon Gianniotis	Greece	56:56.6	14
4	Francisco Hervás	Spain	57:00.9	12
5	Alex Schelvis	Netherlands	57:01.7	10
6	Igor Chervynskiy	Ukraine	57:06.0	8
7	David Browne	Australia	57:11.5	6
8	Luca Ferretti	Italy	57:09.0	5
9	Simone Ercoli	Italy	57:10.0	4
10	Ky Hurst	Australia	57:11.5	2
10	Christian Hein	Germany	57:11.5	2
10	Csaba Gercsák	Hungary	57:11.5	2
13	Ricardo Monasterio	Venezuela	57:15.9	
14	Artem Podyakov	Russia	57:28.2	
15	Scott Kaufmann	United States	57:36.9	
16	Jarrod Ballem	Canada	57:38.0	
17	Mark Warkentin	United States	57:39.5	
18	Jakub Fichtl	Czech Republic	57:39.6	
19	Diego Nogueira Montero	Spain	57:40.1	
20	Mário Pereira	Brazil	57:42.1	
21	Chad Ho	South Africa	57:42.1	
22	Kane Radford	New Zealand	57:46.6	
23	Balázs Gercsák	Hungary	57:50.0	
24	Hu Di	China	57:52.1	
25	Luiz Lima	Brazil	58:30.0	
26	Petar Stoychev	Bulgaria	1:00:11.1	
27	Tihomir Ivanchev	Bulgaria	1:03:23.4	
28	Santiago Enderica Salgado	Ecuador	1:03:23.8	
29	Kurt Niehaus	Costa Rica	1:03:24.5	
30	Roberto Garcia	Chile	1:03:29.0	
31	Esteban Enderica Salgado	Ecuador	1:03:34.2	
32	Kamel Contreras	Dominican Republic	1:10:28.1	
33	Seraj Mouloud	Libya	1:25:04.7	
	Kareem Valentine Sandoval	Antigua and Barbuda	DNF	
	Xu Wenchao	China	DNF	
	Robert des Tombe	Cook Islands	DNF	
	Adu Opanka Okai	Ghana	DNF	
	Bernard Ray Atsu Blewudzi	Ghana	DNF	
	Williams Malique	Antigua and Barbuda	DNF	
	Anthony Kpetonku	Ghana	DNS	
	Daniel Katzir	Israel	DNS	
	Aimable Habimana	Rwanda	DNS	
	Cassim Iyadede	Rwanda	DNS	
