= List of Swimming World Swimmers of the Year =

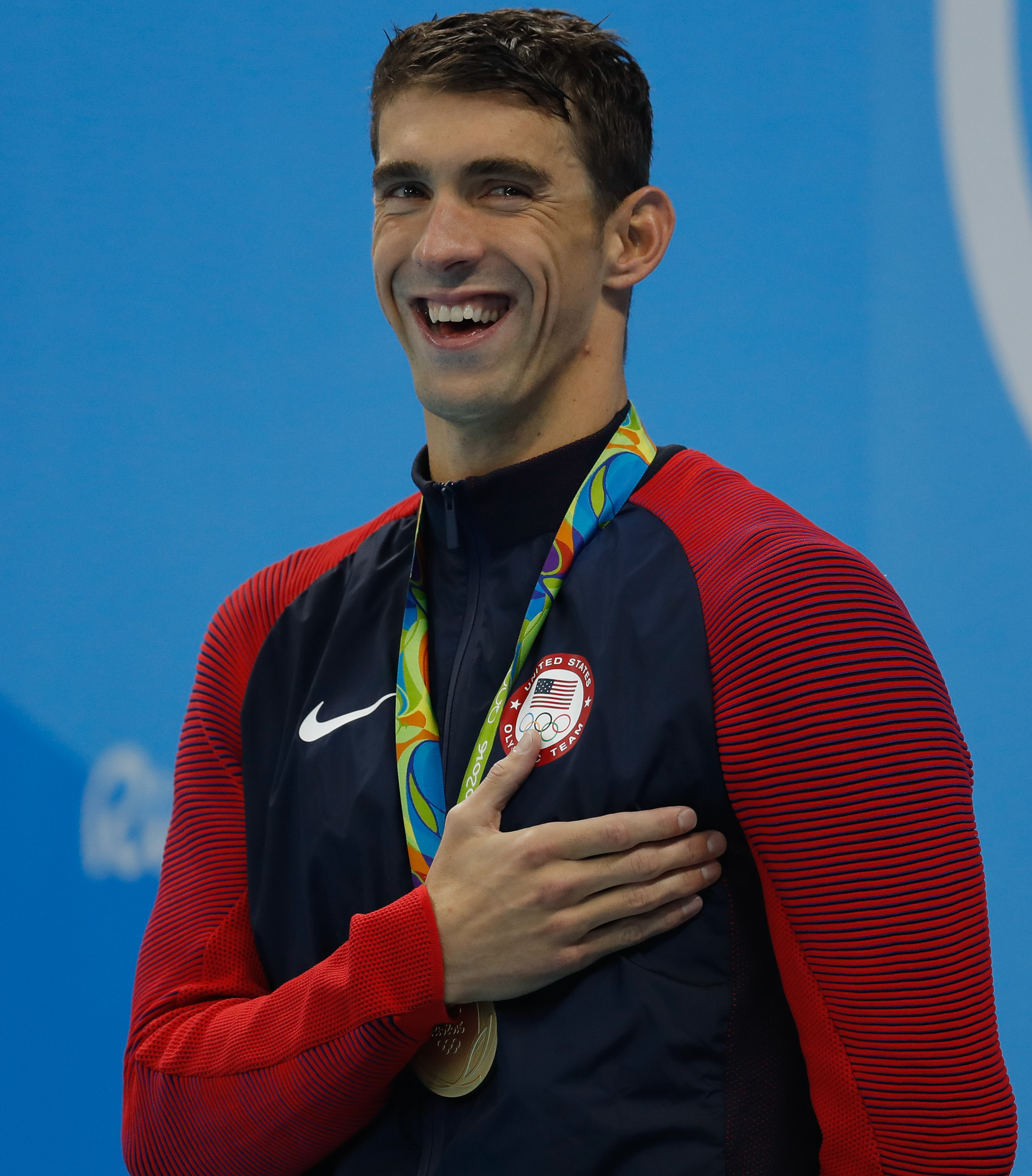
Michael Phelps was the male World Swimmer of the Year in 2003, 2004, 2006, 2007, 2008, 2009, 2012, and 2016.

Swimming World Swimmers of the Year is awarded by the American-based Swimming World. There are seven categories: World Swimmer, American Swimmer, European Swimmer, Pacific Rim Swimmer, World Disabled Swimmer, African Swimmer, and Open Water Swimmer of year. An award for male and female is made for each category.

The award was inaugurated in 1964, when Swimming World named Don Schollander as its World Swimmer of the Year. Two years later, a female category was added, and the awards continued in this format until 1980. The winners were mostly American until the rise of East Germany's women in the 1970s, and 1980 saw the creation of subcategories for American and European swimmers. Following the end of the Cold War, Germany declined following the end of the East's systematic state-sponsored doping program, while Australia's swimming team enjoyed a revival. In December 2013, Swimming World announced a decision to strip the drug-fueled East Germans of all World and European Swimmers of the Year awards.

In 1994, Australian swimmers won both awards for World Swimmer of the Year for the first time, and in 1995, a subcategory was inaugurated for Pacific Rim swimmers. A subcategory for disabled swimmers was introduced in 2003, and in the following year, an African award was launched after South Africa became the first country from the continent to win an Olympic relay. In 2005, open water swimming was added to the Olympic program and another category was duly added.

United States swimmers have won the title 51 times, followed by Australia (13 times) and East Germany (11 times). This ratio is approximately proportional to the number of gold medals won by the respective nations at the Olympics. East Germany was particularly successful in the 1970s and 1980s, when they dominated the women's events, aided by systematic state-sponsored doping. Michael Phelps of the United States has won the global award eight times, followed by Katie Ledecky of the United States and Ian Thorpe of Australia with four. Regionally, German, Hungarian and Dutch swimmers have had the most success in Europe, while Australians have won more than three-quarters of the Pacific awards.

== World Swimmers of the Year ==
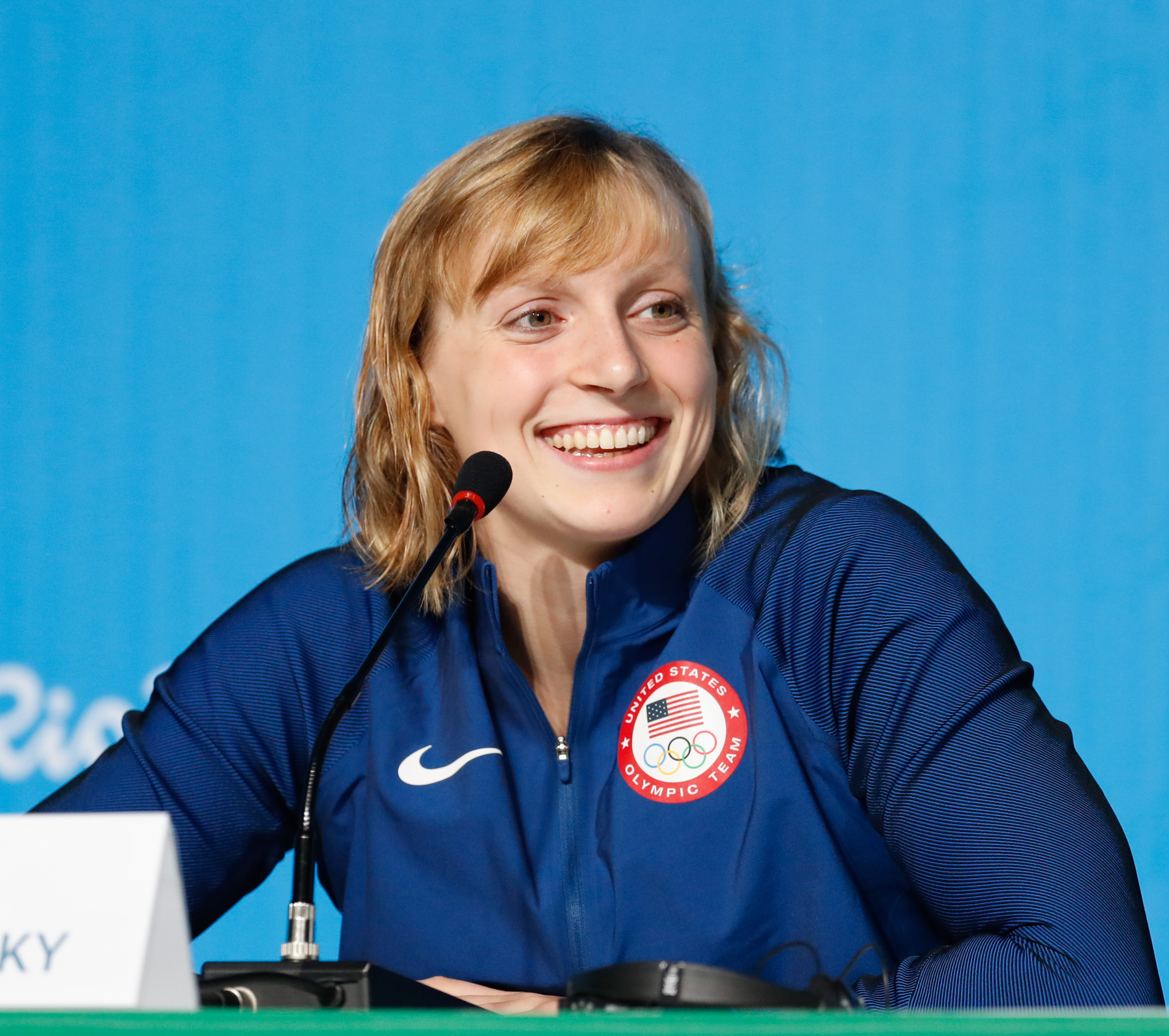
Katie Ledecky, five-time female World Swimmer of the Year

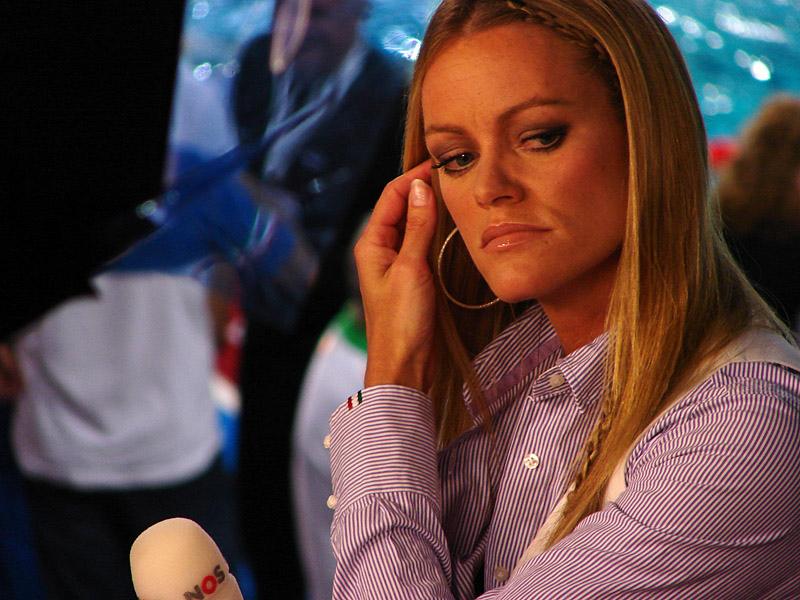
Inge de Bruijn, the only Dutch female World Swimmer of the Year

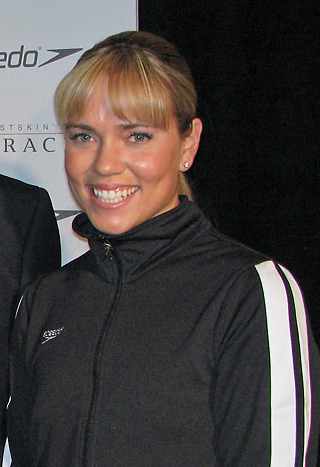
Natalie Coughlin, female world Swimmer of the Year in 2002

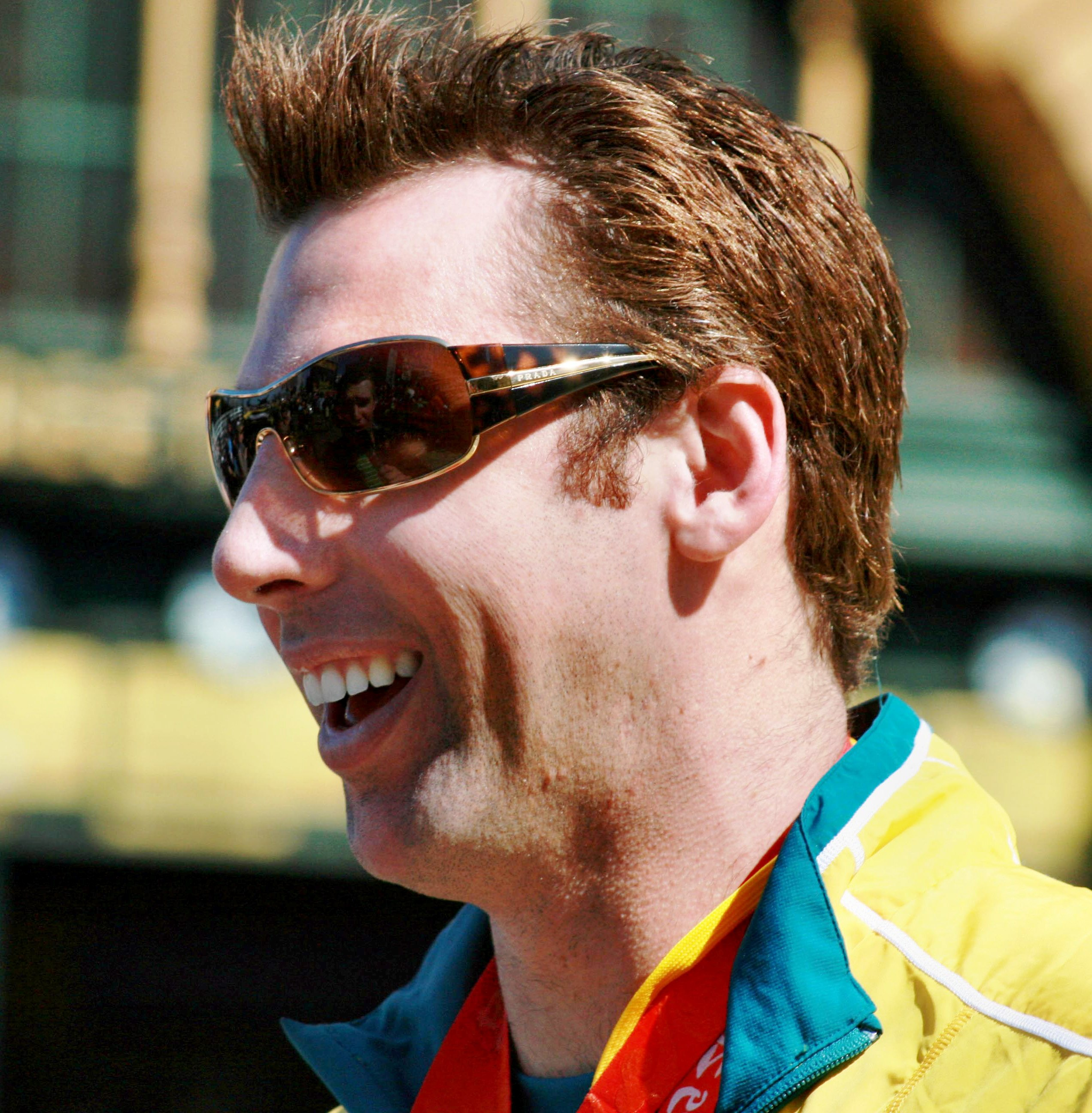
Grant Hackett, male World Swimmer of the Year in 2005

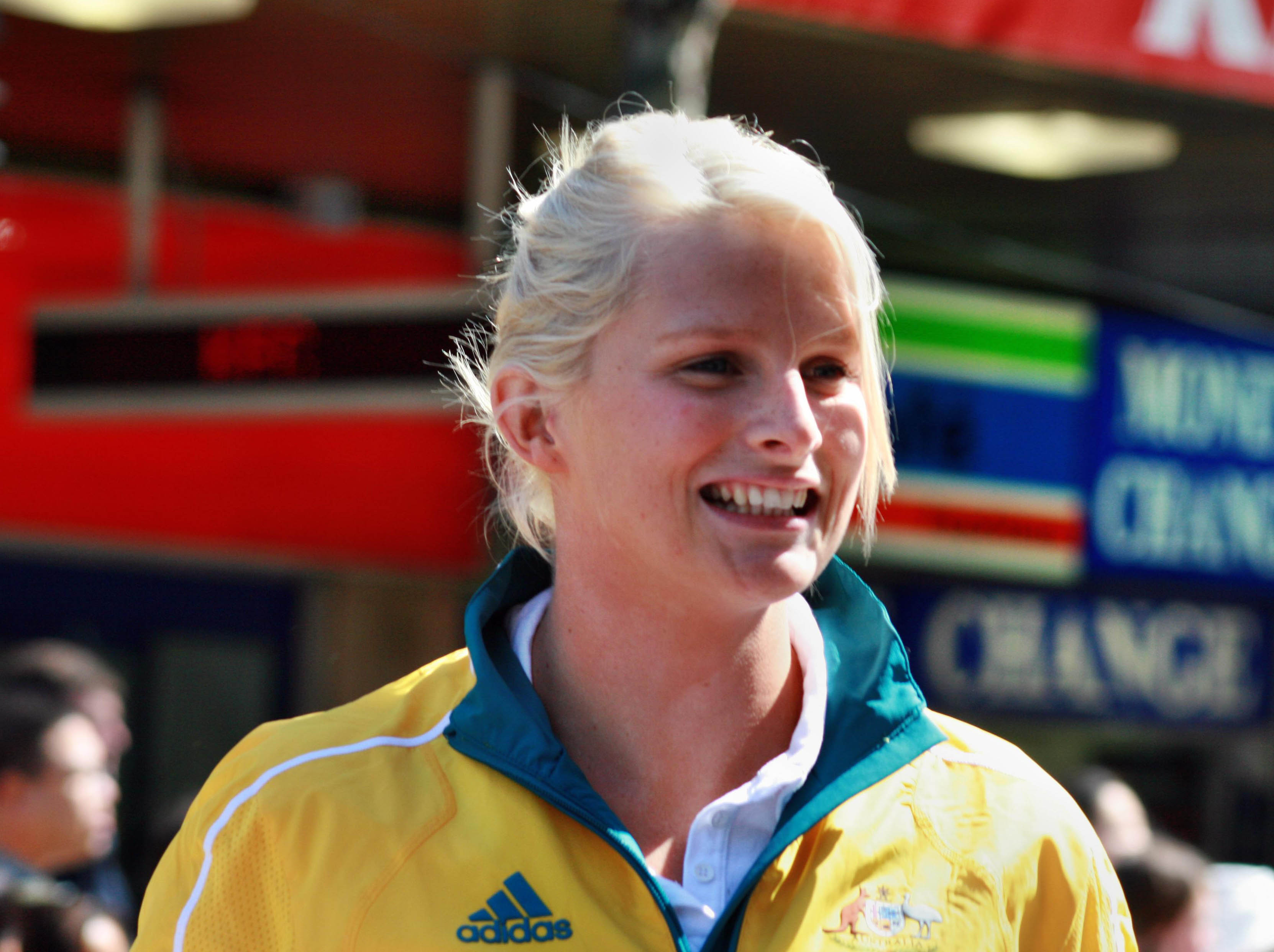
Leisel Jones, female World Swimmer of the Year in 2005 and 2006

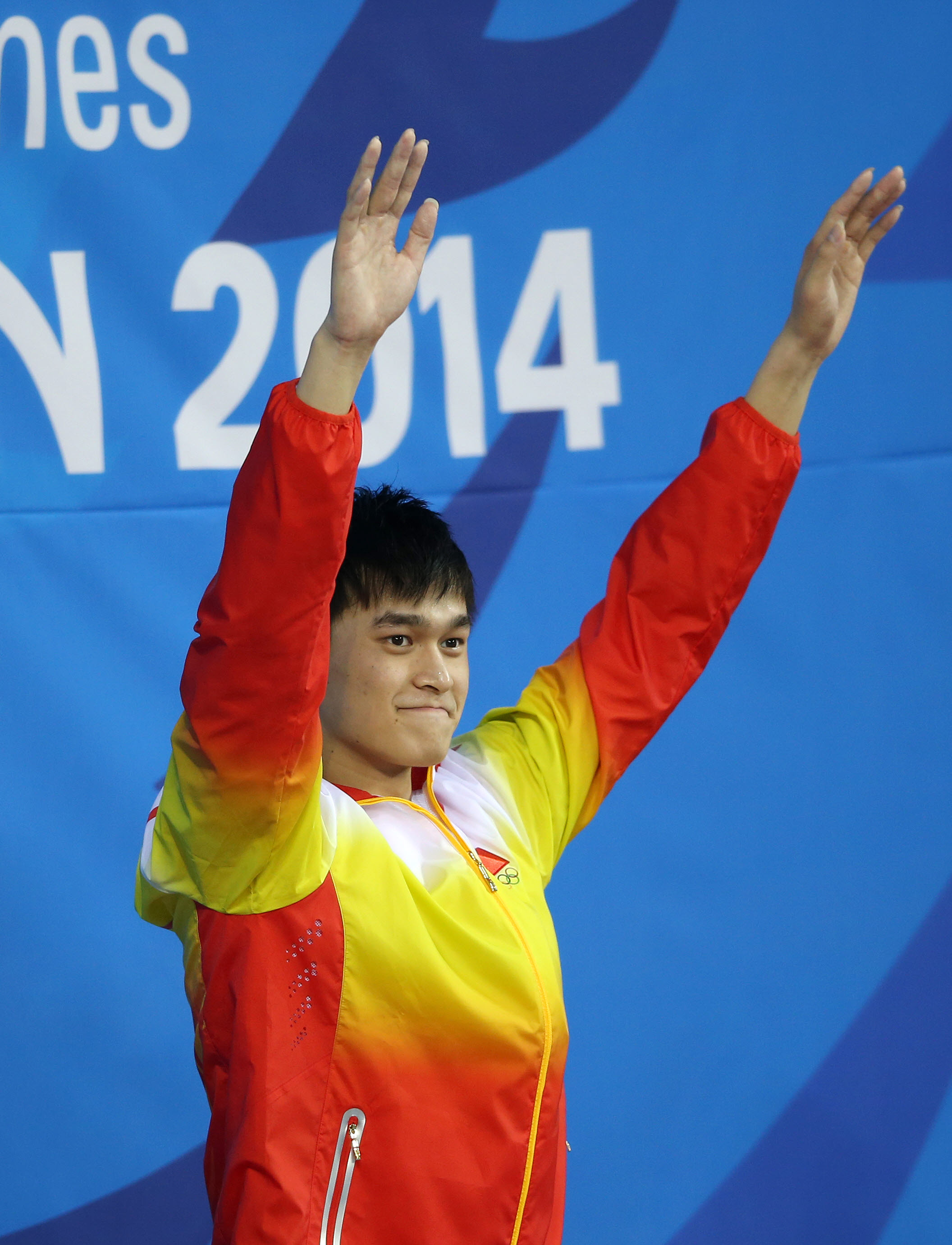
Sun Yang is the 2013 male World Swimmer of the Year and a five-time male Pacific Rim Swimmer of the Year. He is the only Chinese World Swimmer of the Year.

The award was inaugurated in 1964, when Swimming World named Don Schollander as its World Swimmer of the Year. One year later, a female category was added. From 1973 until 1989, the rise of East Germany's women saw them win a majority of the awards. Following the end of the Cold War, Germany declined following the end of the East's systematic state-sponsored doping program, while Australia's swimming team enjoyed a revival in the late 1990s, winning nine awards since 1997, the most by any country in that period. Swimming World has since stripped the East Germans of their titles.

United States swimmers have won the title 51 times, followed by Australia (13 times) and East Germany (11 times). This ratio is approximately proportional to the number of gold medals won by the respective nations at the Olympics. East Germany was particularly successful in the 1970s and 1980s, when they dominated the women's events, aided by systematic state-sponsored doping.

With his win in 2016, Michael Phelps (United States) now holds the overall record with eight titles. He won in 2003, 2004, 2006, 2007, 2008, 2009, 2012, and 2016. Katie Ledecky (United States) is the second most-prolific winner, winning in 2013, 2014, 2015, 2016, and 2018. Phelps and Ledecky are the only swimmers to win the award four straight times. Ian Thorpe (AUS) was honored four times, in 1998, 1999, 2001 and 2002.

Ledecky is the only female swimmer to win the award more than three times. Four female swimmers have won three awards: Debbie Meyer (United States) in 1967, 1968 and 1969, Krisztina Egerszegi (HUN) in 1991, 1992 and 1995, Janet Evans (United States) in 1987, 1989 and 1990, and Kristin Otto (GDR) in 1984, 1986 and 1988. Franziska van Almsick is the youngest female to have won the award, having turned 15 on 5 April in the year of her first award. Thorpe is the youngest male recipient, having turned 16 on 13 October in the year of his first award.

World Swimmer of the Year
Year	Female winner	Nationality	Male winner	Nationality
1964	Not awarded	N/A	Don Schollander	United States
1965	Martha Randall	United States	Dick Roth	United States
1966	Claudia Kolb	United States	Mike Burton	United States
1967	Debbie Meyer	United States	Mark Spitz	United States
1968	Debbie Meyer	United States	Charlie Hickcox	United States
1969	Debbie Meyer	United States	Gary Hall Sr.	United States
1970	Alice Jones	United States	Gary Hall Sr.	United States
1971	Shane Gould	Australia	Mark Spitz	United States
1972	Shane Gould	Australia	Mark Spitz	United States
1973	~~Kornelia Ender~~	~~East Germany~~	Rick DeMont	United States
1974	~~Ulrike Tauber~~	~~East Germany~~	Tim Shaw	United States
1975	~~Kornelia Ender~~	~~East Germany~~	Tim Shaw	United States
1976	~~Kornelia Ender~~	~~East Germany~~	John Naber	United States
1977	~~Ulrike Tauber~~	~~East Germany~~	Brian Goodell	United States
1978	Tracy Caulkins	United States	Jesse Vassallo	United States
1979	Cynthia Woodhead	United States	Vladimir Salnikov	Soviet Union
1980	~~Petra Schneider~~	~~East Germany~~	Rowdy Gaines	United States
1981	Mary T. Meagher	United States	Alex Baumann	Canada
1982	~~Petra Schneider~~	~~East Germany~~	Vladimir Salnikov	Soviet Union
1983	~~Ute Geweniger~~	~~East Germany~~	Rick Carey	United States
1984	~~Kristin Otto~~	~~East Germany~~	Alex Baumann	Canada
1985	Mary T. Meagher	United States	Michael Groß	West Germany
1986	~~Kristin Otto~~	~~East Germany~~	Matt Biondi	United States
1987	Janet Evans	United States	Tamás Darnyi	Hungary
1988	~~Kristin Otto~~	~~East Germany~~	Matt Biondi	United States
1989	Janet Evans	United States	Mike Barrowman	United States
1990	Janet Evans	United States	Mike Barrowman	United States
1991	Krisztina Egerszegi	Hungary	Tamás Darnyi	Hungary
1992	Krisztina Egerszegi	Hungary	Yevgeny Sadovyi	Russia
1993	Franziska van Almsick	Germany	Károly Güttler	Hungary
1994	Samantha Riley	Australia	Kieren Perkins	Australia
1995	Krisztina Egerszegi	Hungary	Denis Pankratov	Russia
1996	Penny Heyns	South Africa	Denis Pankratov	Russia
1997	Claudia Poll	Costa Rica	Michael Klim	Australia
1998	Jenny Thompson	United States	Ian Thorpe	Australia
1999	Penny Heyns	South Africa	Ian Thorpe	Australia
2000	Inge de Bruijn	Netherlands	Pieter van den Hoogenband	Netherlands
2001	Inge de Bruijn	Netherlands	Ian Thorpe	Australia
2002	Natalie Coughlin	United States	Ian Thorpe	Australia
2003	Hannah Stockbauer	Germany	Michael Phelps	United States
2004	Yana Klochkova	Ukraine	Michael Phelps	United States
2005	Leisel Jones	Australia	Grant Hackett	Australia
2006	Leisel Jones	Australia	Michael Phelps	United States
2007	Laure Manaudou	France	Michael Phelps	United States
2008	Stephanie Rice	Australia	Michael Phelps	United States
2009	Federica Pellegrini	Italy	Michael Phelps	United States
2010	Rebecca Soni	United States	Ryan Lochte	United States
2011	Rebecca Soni	United States	Ryan Lochte	United States
2012	Missy Franklin	United States	Michael Phelps	United States
2013	Katie Ledecky	United States	Sun Yang	China
2014	Katie Ledecky	United States	Kosuke Hagino	Japan
2015	Katie Ledecky	United States	Adam Peaty	Great Britain
2016	Katie Ledecky	United States	Michael Phelps	United States
2017	Sarah Sjöström	Sweden	Caeleb Dressel	United States
2018	Katie Ledecky	United States	Adam Peaty	Great Britain
2019	Regan Smith	United States	Caeleb Dressel	United States
2020	Not awarded due to COVID-19 pandemic			
2021	Emma McKeon	Australia	Caeleb Dressel	United States
2022	Ariarne Titmus	Australia	David Popovici	Romania
2023	Kaylee McKeown	Australia	Léon Marchand	France
2024	Summer McIntosh	Canada	Léon Marchand	France
2025	Summer McIntosh	Canada	Léon Marchand	France

== American Swimmers of the Year ==
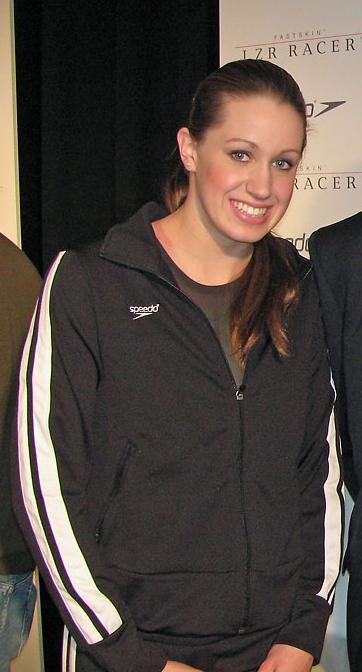
Katie Hoff, female American Swimmer of the Year from 2005 to 2007

Michael Phelps has been named American Swimmer of the Year on eleven occasions; his streak of 2001 to 2009 was interrupted only by Aaron Peirsol in 2005. Katie Ledecky is the most decorated female swimmer with six awards, followed by Evans, who won five consecutive awards from 1987 to 1991. Tracy Caulkins won four times in the early-1980s, while Natalie Coughlin, Katie Hoff and Jenny Thompson all won three times. On the men's side, Mike Barrowman and Lenny Krayzelburg won the award four consecutive times, while Matt Biondi and Tom Dolan captured three awards.

American Swimmers of the Year
Year	Female winner	Male winner
1980	Tracy Caulkins	Mike Bruner
1981	Tracy Caulkins	Craig Beardsley
1982	Tracy Caulkins	Steve Lundquist
1983	Tiffany Cohen	Rick Carey
1984	Tracy Caulkins	Pablo Morales
1985	Mary T. Meagher	Matt Biondi
1986	Betsy Mitchell	Matt Biondi
1987	Janet Evans	David Wharton
1988	Janet Evans	Matt Biondi
1989	Janet Evans	Mike Barrowman
1990	Janet Evans	Mike Barrowman
1991	Janet Evans	Mike Barrowman
1992	Summer Sanders	Mike Barrowman
1993	Jenny Thompson	Eric Namesnik
1994	Allison Wagner	Tom Dolan
1995	Amy Van Dyken	Tom Dolan
1996	Amy Van Dyken	4×100 m medley relay team (Note: In 1996 the American Swimmer of the Year award was given to the 4×100 m medley relay team of Jeff Rouse, Jeremy Linn, Mark Henderson, and Gary Hall Jr. who won gold and broke the world record at the Olympics that year.)
1997	Kristine Quance	Lenny Krayzelburg
1998	Jenny Thompson	Lenny Krayzelburg
1999	Jenny Thompson	Lenny Krayzelburg
2000	Brooke Bennett	Lenny Krayzelburg; Tom Dolan
2001	Natalie Coughlin	Michael Phelps
2002	Natalie Coughlin	Michael Phelps
2003	Amanda Beard	Michael Phelps
2004	Amanda Beard	Michael Phelps
2005	Katie Hoff	Aaron Peirsol
2006	Katie Hoff	Michael Phelps
2007	Katie Hoff	Michael Phelps
2008	Natalie Coughlin	Michael Phelps
2009	Ariana Kukors; Rebecca Soni	Michael Phelps
2010	Rebecca Soni	Ryan Lochte
2011	Rebecca Soni	Ryan Lochte
2012	Missy Franklin	Michael Phelps
2013	Katie Ledecky	Ryan Lochte
2014	Katie Ledecky	Ryan Cochrane; Tyler Clary
2015	Katie Ledecky	Michael Phelps
2016	Katie Ledecky	Michael Phelps
2017	Katie Ledecky	Caeleb Dressel
2018	Katie Ledecky	Chase Kalisz
2019	Regan Smith	Caeleb Dressel
2020	Not awarded due to COVID-19 pandemic	
2021	Katie Ledecky	Caeleb Dressel
2022	Katie Ledecky	Bobby Finke
2023	Summer McIntosh	Ryan Murphy
2024	Summer McIntosh	Bobby Finke
2025	Summer McIntosh	Jack Alexy

== European Swimmers of the Year ==
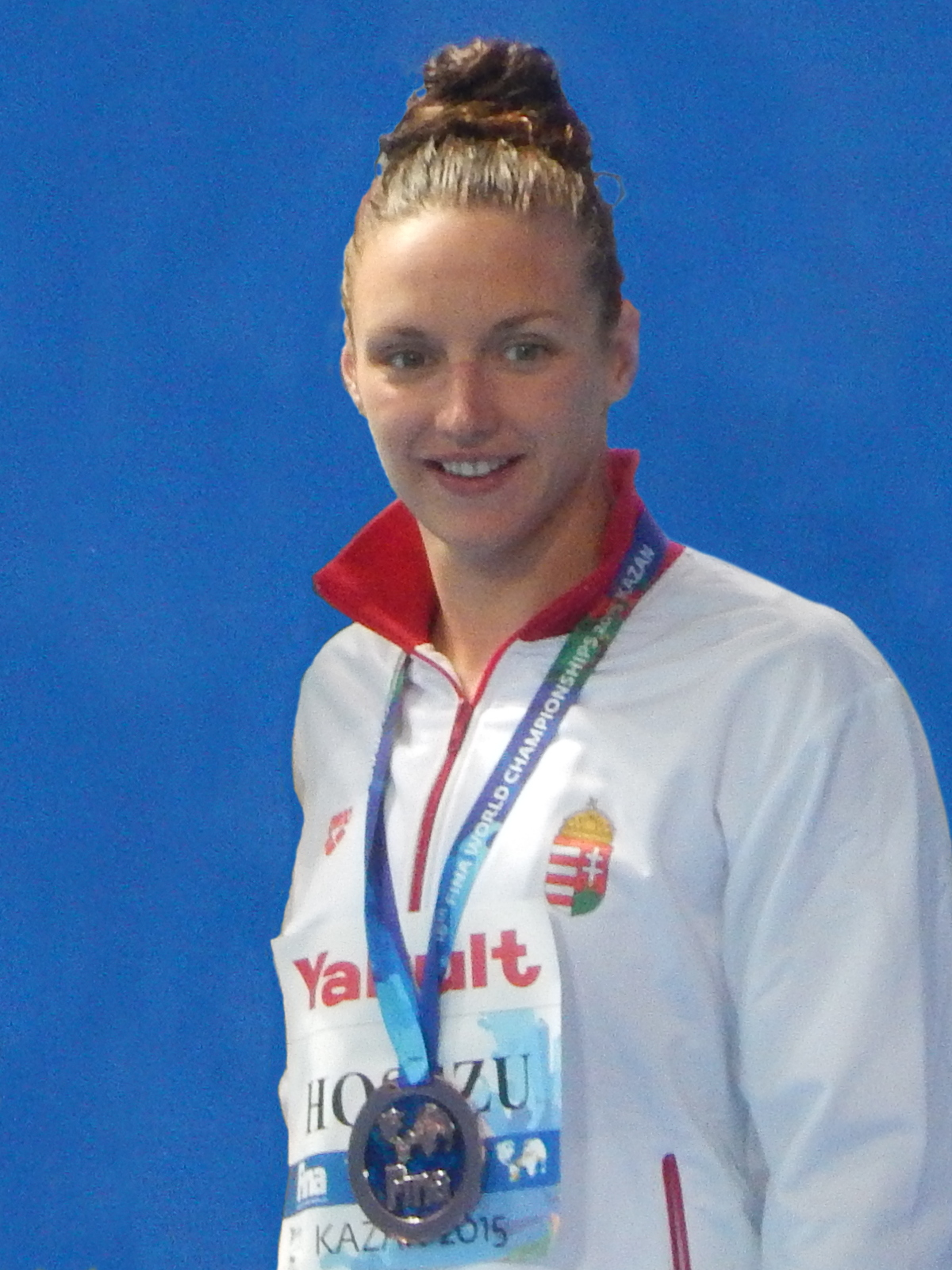
Katinka Hosszú, four-time winner of the European Swimmer of the Year award

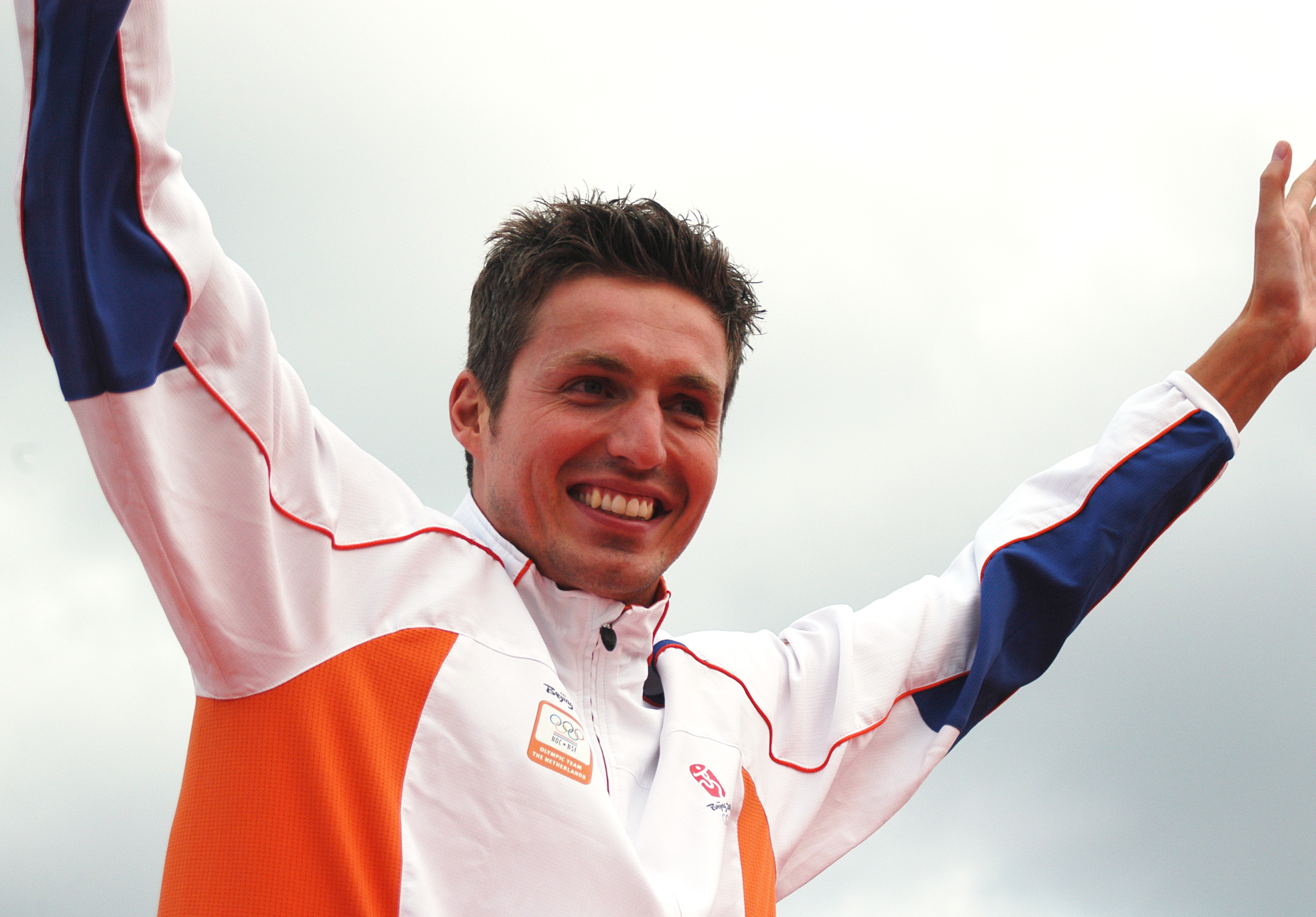
Pieter van den Hoogenband was the European Swimmer of the Year four times.

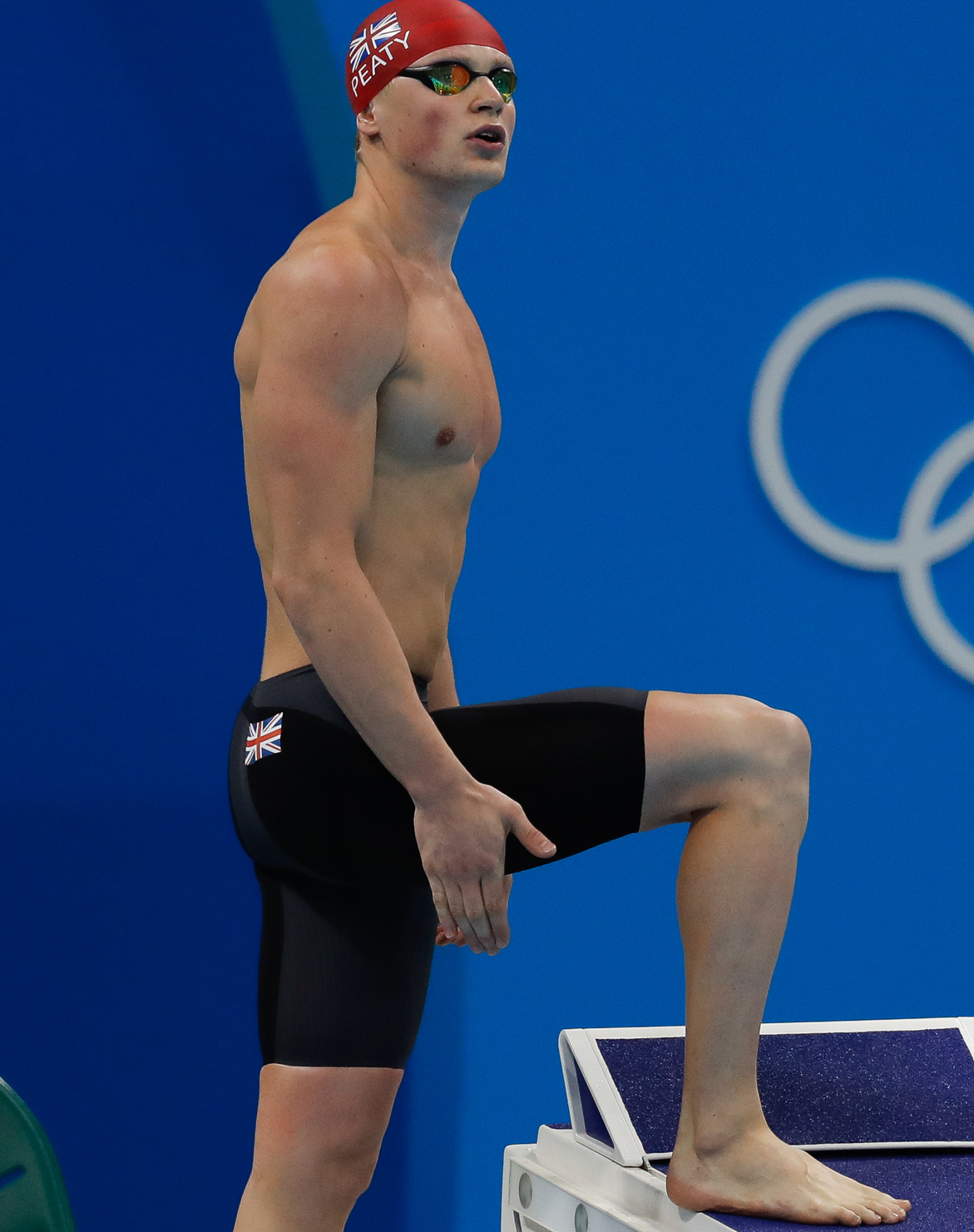
Adam Peaty won the European Swimmer of the Year six times.

East Germany was particularly successful in the 1970s and 1980s, when they dominated the women's events, aided by systematic state-sponsored doping. Their women swept the award for the first ten years of its existence from 1980 to 1989, with Kristin Otto winning three times, before the Berlin Wall and communism fell. With the end of the state-sponsored doping program, the (East) German stranglehold on women's swimming was broken. In the two decades since reunification, the female award was won by Germans four times, three by Franziska van Almsick. During the 1980s, Michael Gross of West Germany, nicknamed The Albatross in reference to his vast wingspan, dominated European swimming, winning five consecutive awards from 1982 to 1986, record that stood alone until Adam Peaty of Great Britain equalled the feat between 2014 and 2018. Swimming World has vacated all awards previously awarded to East German swimmers because of the government-sanctioned systematic doping.

Hungary has won the award 17 times, mainly on the back of its strength in medley swimming. Breaststrokers Ágnes Kovács and Károly Güttler, and backstroker Sándor Wladár were the only Hungarian winners who were not champion medley swimmers. Krisztina Egerszegi won four awards, the most by a female swimmer, while Tamás Darnyi claimed three. The Netherlands have won seven awards, through the efforts of Inge de Bruijn (3) and Pieter van den Hoogenband (4), who led the sprinting world for women and men at the turn of the century. Russian or Soviet swimmers have won seven awards, all of them male.

European Swimmers of the Year
Year	Female winner	Nationality	Male winner	Nationality
1980	~~Petra Schneider~~	~~East Germany~~	Vladimir Salnikov	Soviet Union
1981	~~Ute Geweniger~~	~~East Germany~~	Sándor Wladár	Hungary
1982	~~Cornelia Sirch~~	~~East Germany~~	Michael Groß	West Germany
1983	~~Ute Geweniger~~	~~East Germany~~	Michael Groß	West Germany
1984	~~Kristin Otto~~	~~East Germany~~	Michael Groß	West Germany
1985	~~Silke Hörner~~	~~East Germany~~	Michael Groß	West Germany
1986	~~Kristin Otto~~	~~East Germany~~	Michael Groß	West Germany
1987	~~Silke Hörner~~	~~East Germany~~	Tamás Darnyi	Hungary
1988	~~Kristin Otto~~	~~East Germany~~	Tamás Darnyi	Hungary
1989	~~Anke Möhring~~	~~East Germany~~	Giorgio Lamberti	Italy
1990	Krisztina Egerszegi	Hungary	Adrian Moorhouse	Great Britain
1991	Krisztina Egerszegi	Hungary	Tamás Darnyi	Hungary
1992	Krisztina Egerszegi	Hungary	Yevgeny Sadovyi	Russia
1993	Franziska van Almsick	Germany	Károly Güttler	Hungary
1994	Franziska van Almsick	Germany	Alexander Popov	Russia
1995	Krisztina Egerszegi	Hungary	Denis Pankratov	Russia
1996	Michelle Smith	Ireland	Denis Pankratov	Russia
1997	Ágnes Kovács	Hungary	Emiliano Brembilla	Italy
1998	Ágnes Kovács	Hungary	Denys Sylantyev	Ukraine
1999	Inge de Bruijn	Netherlands	Pieter van den Hoogenband	Netherlands
2000	Inge de Bruijn	Netherlands	Pieter van den Hoogenband	Netherlands
2001	Inge de Bruijn	Netherlands	Roman Sloudnov	Russia
2002	Franziska van Almsick	Germany	Pieter van den Hoogenband	Netherlands
2003	Hannah Stockbauer	Germany	Alexander Popov	Russia
2004	Yana Klochkova	Ukraine	Pieter van den Hoogenband	Netherlands
2005	Otylia Jędrzejczak	Poland	László Cseh	Hungary
2006	Laure Manaudou	France	László Cseh	Hungary
2007	Laure Manaudou	France	Mateusz Sawrymowicz	Poland
2008	Rebecca Adlington	Great Britain	Alain Bernard	France
2009	Federica Pellegrini	Italy	Paul Biedermann	Germany
2010	Federica Pellegrini	Italy	Camille Lacourt	France
2011	Federica Pellegrini	Italy	Alexander Dale Oen	Norway
2012	Ranomi Kromowidjojo	Netherlands	Yannick Agnel	France
2013	Katinka Hosszú	Hungary	Dániel Gyurta	Hungary
2014	Katinka Hosszú	Hungary	Adam Peaty	Great Britain
2015	Sarah Sjöström	Sweden	Adam Peaty	Great Britain
2016	Katinka Hosszú	Hungary	Adam Peaty	Great Britain
2017	Sarah Sjöström	Sweden	Adam Peaty	Great Britain
2018	Sarah Sjöström	Sweden	Adam Peaty	Great Britain
2019	Katinka Hosszú	Hungary	Adam Peaty	Great Britain
2020	Not awarded due to COVID-19 pandemic			
2021	Sarah Sjöström	Sweden	Evgeny Rylov	Russia
2022	Sarah Sjöström	Sweden	David Popovici	Romania
2023	Sarah Sjöström	Sweden	Léon Marchand	France
2024	Sarah Sjöström	Sweden	Léon Marchand	France
2025	Marrit Steenbergen	Netherlands	Léon Marchand	France

== Pacific Rim Swimmers of the Year ==
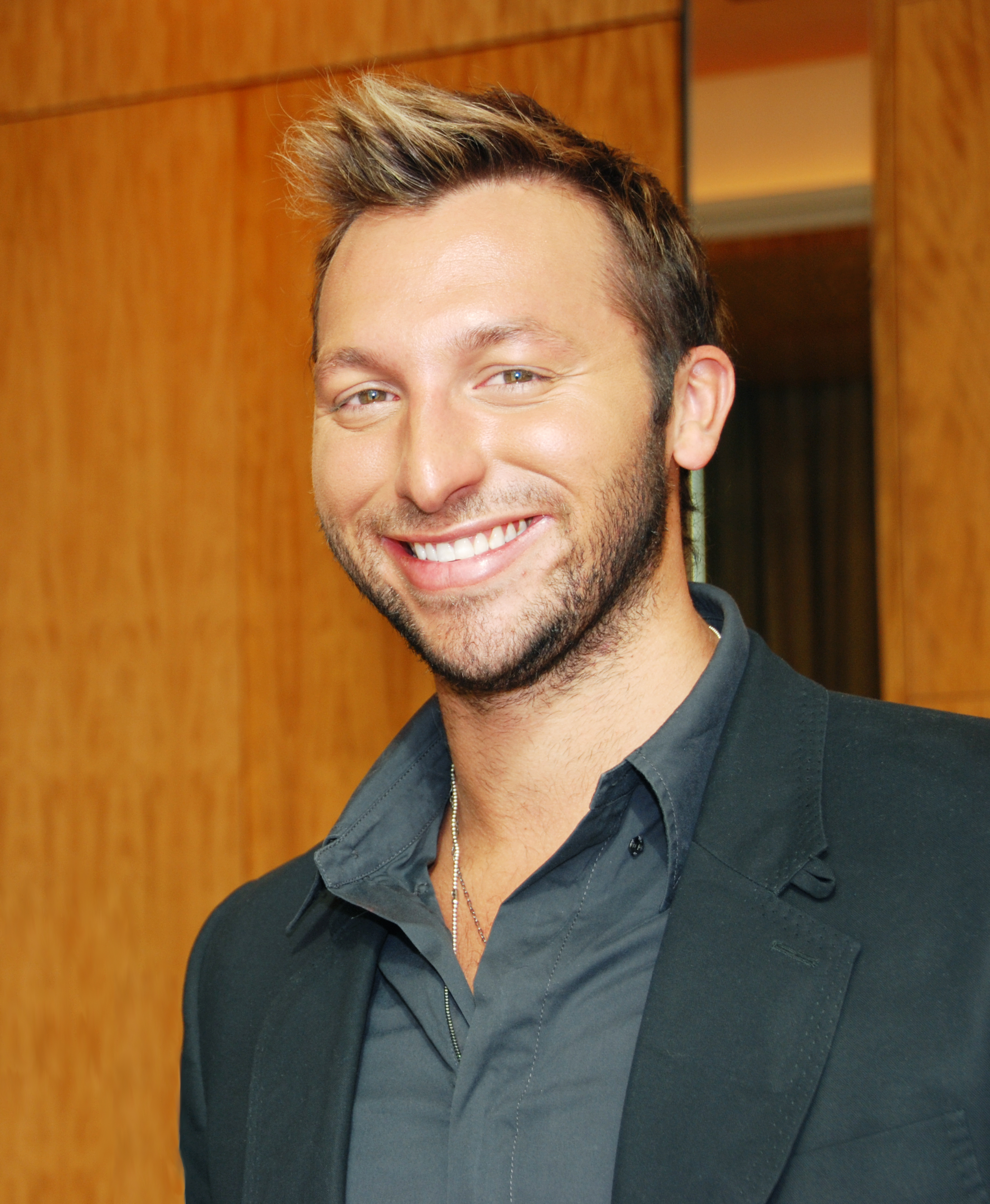
Ian Thorpe is a four-time World Swimmer of the Year and six-time Pacific Rim Swimmer of the Year.

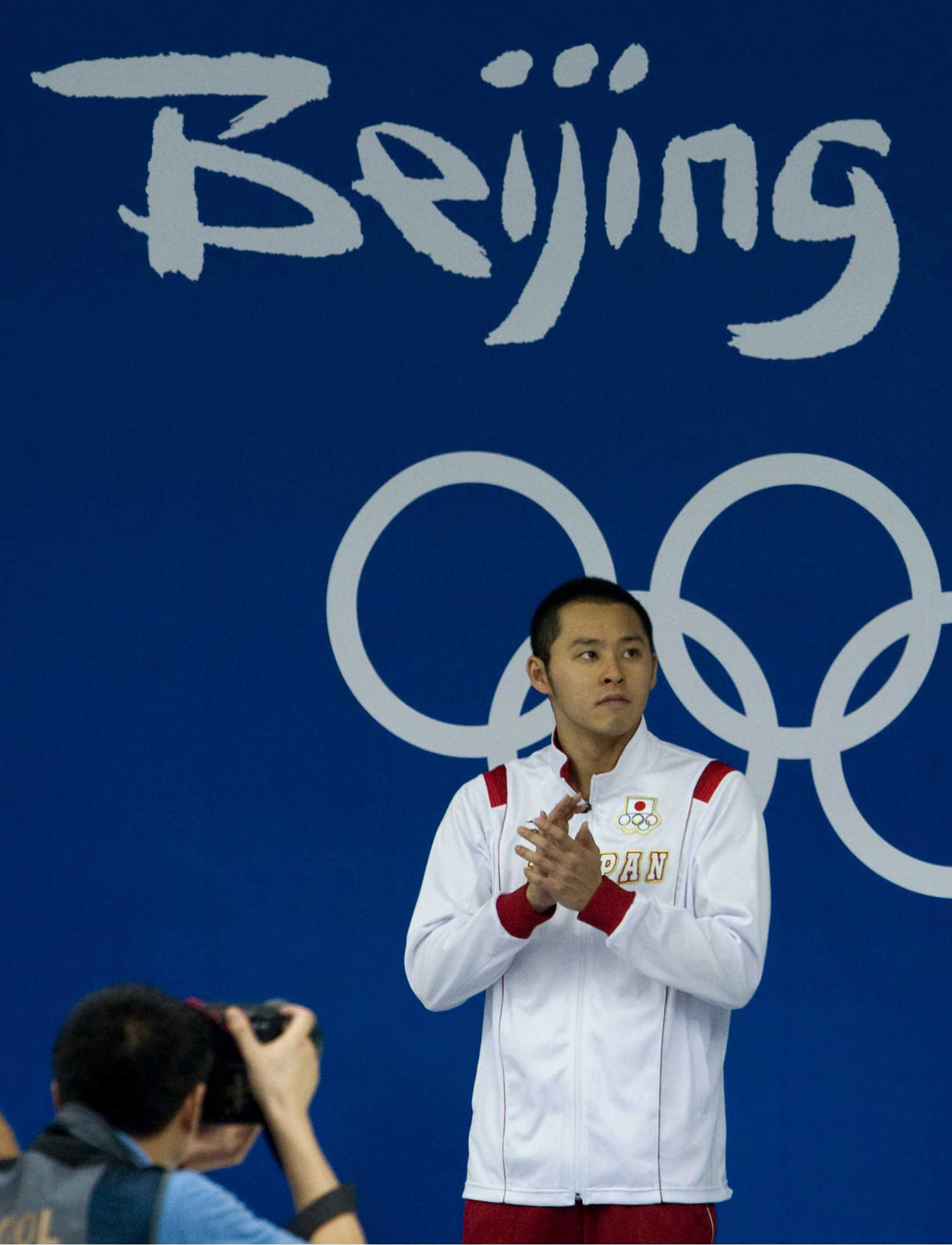
Kosuke Kitajima has been the Pacific Rim Swimmer of the Year four times.

The Pacific Rim award was introduced in 1995, the year after two Australian swimmers—Kieren Perkins and Samantha Riley—became the first two Pacific Rim swimmers to be named as World Swimmer of the Year. It has subsequently been dominated by Australian swimmers, who have won 30 of the 48 awards given. Ian Thorpe won six awards (five consecutively) and Susie O'Neill has won four (three consecutively). Australia's success has been built on female butterfliers (O’Neill and Petria Thomas), female breaststrokers (Riley and Leisel Jones), and male freestylers (Thorpe, Grant Hackett and Michael Klim). The men's awards have been dominated by Asian swimmers since 2006. Kosuke Kitajima (Japan) was the first non-Australian swimmer to win the award more than once (in 2003, 2007, 2008, and 2010). He was followed by Sun Yang of China who won five awards (in 2011, 2012, 2013, 2017 and 2018).

Pacific Rim Swimmers of the Year
Year	Female winner	Nationality	Male winner	Nationality
1995	Susie O'Neill	Australia	Scott Miller	Australia
1996	Le Jingyi	China	Danyon Loader	New Zealand
1997	Samantha Riley	Australia	Michael Klim	Australia
1998	Susie O'Neill	Australia	Ian Thorpe	Australia
1999	Susie O'Neill	Australia	Ian Thorpe	Australia
2000	Susie O'Neill	Australia	Ian Thorpe	Australia
2001	Petria Thomas	Australia	Ian Thorpe	Australia
2002	Petria Thomas	Australia	Ian Thorpe	Australia
2003	Leisel Jones	Australia	Kosuke Kitajima	Japan
2004	Jodie Henry	Australia	Ian Thorpe	Australia
2005	Leisel Jones	Australia	Grant Hackett	Australia
2006	Leisel Jones	Australia	Park Tae-hwan	South Korea
2007	Libby Lenton	Australia	Kosuke Kitajima	Japan
2008	Stephanie Rice	Australia	Kosuke Kitajima	Japan
2009	Jessicah Schipper	Australia	Zhang Lin	China
2010	Alicia Coutts	Australia	Kosuke Kitajima	Japan
2011	Ye Shiwen	China	Sun Yang	China
2012	Ye Shiwen	China	Sun Yang	China
2013	Cate Campbell	Australia	Sun Yang	China
2014	Cate Campbell	Australia	Kosuke Hagino	Japan
2015	Emily Seebohm	Australia	Mitch Larkin	Australia
2016	Rie Kaneto	Japan	Kosuke Hagino	Japan
2017	Emily Seebohm	Australia	Sun Yang	China
2018	Cate Campbell	Australia	Sun Yang	China
2019	Ariarne Titmus	Australia	Daiya Seto	Japan
2020	Not awarded due to COVID-19 pandemic			
2021	Emma McKeon	Australia	Zac Stubblety-Cook	Australia
2022	Ariarne Titmus	Australia	Zac Stubblety-Cook	Australia
2023	Kaylee McKeown	Australia	Qin Haiyang	China
2024	Kaylee McKeown	Australia	Pan Zhanle	China
2025	Kaylee McKeown	Australia	Qin Haiyang	China

== African Swimmers of the Year ==
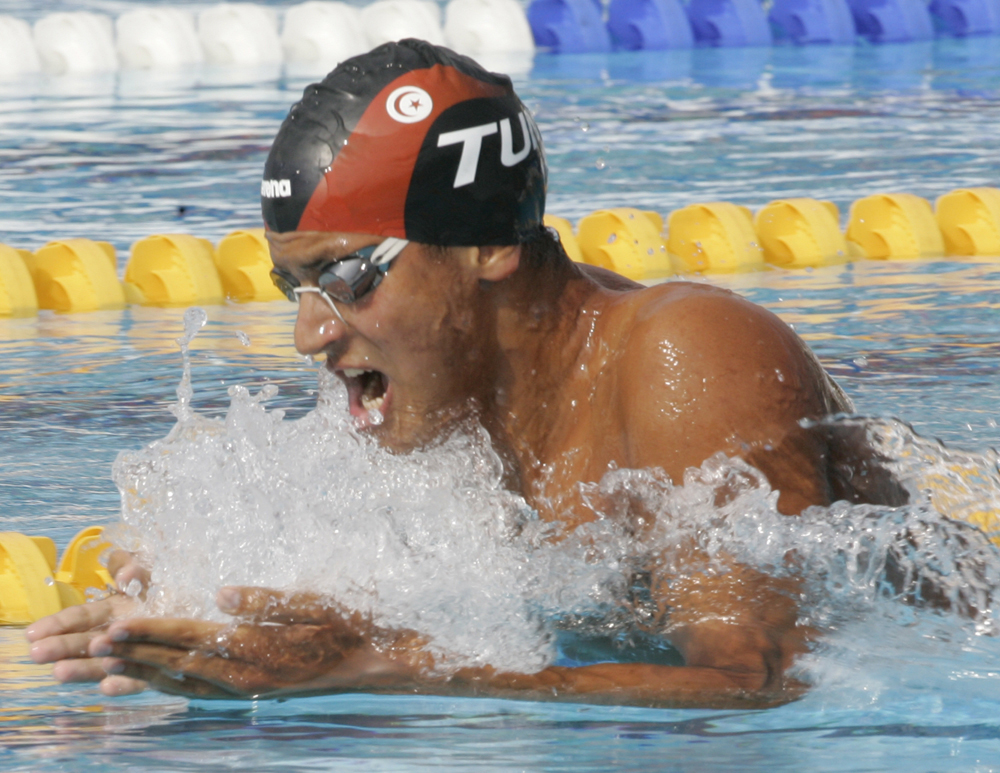
Oussama Mellouli was the first African male to win an individual Olympic gold medal in swimming.

The African award was introduced in 2004, the year in which South Africa won the men's 4 × 100 m freestyle relay at the Olympics. Although Joan Harrison (1952) and Penny Heyns (1996) had won individual gold medals for South Africa, the 2004 victory was the first time that an African relay team won a medal, indicating their increasing depth. In the same Olympics, Zimbabwe's Kirsty Coventry's won three medals, including one gold, making her the first African swimmer outside of South Africa to stand on the podium. Coventry has won the female award nine times. South African Chad le Clos won seven men's awards in a row, and South African sprinter Roland Schoeman four, and in total South African swimmers have claimed nineteen awards. In 2008, Ous Mellouli of Tunisia broke the South African and Zimbabwean duopoly after becoming the first African male to win an individual Olympic gold medal.

African Swimmers of the Year
Year	Female winner	Nationality	Male winner	Nationality
2004	Kirsty Coventry	Zimbabwe	Roland Schoeman	South Africa
2005	Kirsty Coventry	Zimbabwe	Roland Schoeman	South Africa
2006	Suzaan van Biljon	South Africa	Roland Schoeman	South Africa
2007	Kirsty Coventry	Zimbabwe	Roland Schoeman	South Africa
2008	Kirsty Coventry	Zimbabwe	Oussama Mellouli	Tunisia
2009	Kirsty Coventry	Zimbabwe	Oussama Mellouli; Cameron van der Burgh	Tunisia; South Africa
2010	Mandy Loots	South Africa	Cameron van der Burgh	South Africa
2011	Kirsty Coventry	Zimbabwe	Cameron van der Burgh	South Africa
2012	Kirsty Coventry	Zimbabwe	Chad le Clos	South Africa
2013	Karin Prinsloo	South Africa	Chad le Clos	South Africa
2014	Karin Prinsloo	South Africa	Chad le Clos	South Africa
2015	Kirsty Coventry	Zimbabwe	Chad le Clos	South Africa
2016	Kirsty Coventry	Zimbabwe	Chad le Clos	South Africa
2017	Farida Osman	Egypt	Chad le Clos	South Africa
2018	Tatjana Schoenmaker	South Africa	Chad le Clos	South Africa
2019	Tatjana Schoenmaker	South Africa	Chad le Clos	South Africa
2020	Not awarded due to COVID-19 pandemic			
2021	Tatjana Schoenmaker	South Africa	Ahmed Hafnaoui	Tunisia
2022	Lara van Niekerk	South Africa	Pieter Coetze	South Africa
2023	Tatjana Schoenmaker	South Africa	Ahmed Hafnaoui	Tunisia
2024	Tatjana Smith	South Africa	Ahmed Jaouadi	Tunisia
2025	Kaylene Corbett	South Africa	Ahmed Jaouadi	Tunisia

== Open Water Swimmers of the Year ==
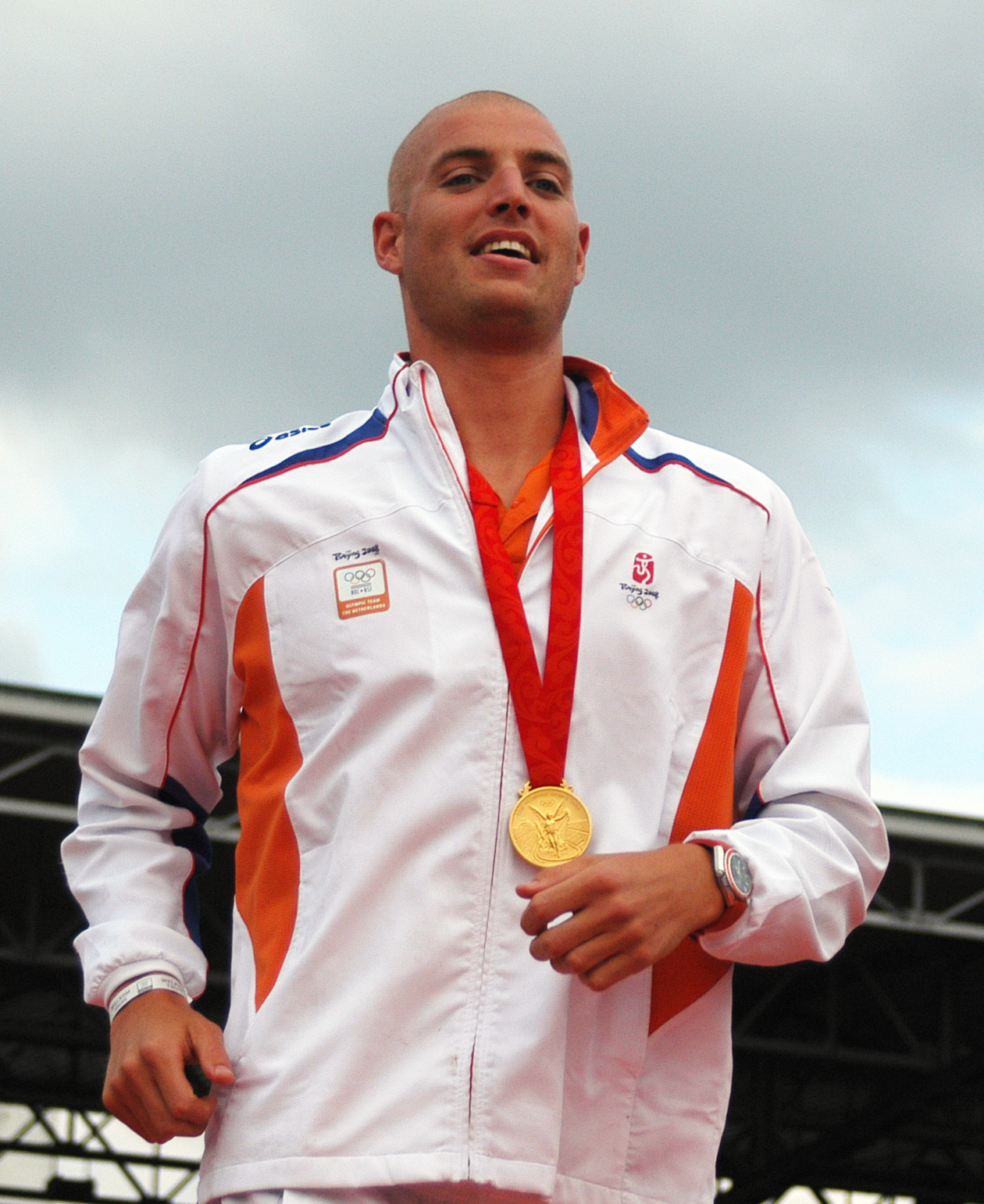
Maarten van der Weijden was the 2008 Open Water Swimmer of the Year.

The Open Water award was introduced in 2005, when it was announced that open water swimming events would be included in the Olympics for the first time: the men's and women's 10 km events at the 2008 Olympics. The award has been won by Dutch and German swimmers five times, while Russian swimmers have won four times. Thomas Lurz of Germany has won the award five times, triumphing in 2005, 2006, 2009, 2011 and 2013, while Russia's Larisa Ilchenko has won the award three years in a row (2006–2008).

Open Water Swimmers of the Year
Year	Female winner	Nationality	Male winner	Nationality
2005	Edith van Dijk	Netherlands	Thomas Lurz; Chip Peterson	Germany; United States
2006	Larisa Ilchenko	Russia	Thomas Lurz	Germany
2007	Larisa Ilchenko	Russia	Vladimir Dyatchin	Russia
2008	Larisa Ilchenko	Russia	Maarten van der Weijden	Netherlands
2009	Keri-Anne Payne	United Kingdom	Thomas Lurz	Germany
2010	Martina Grimaldi	Italy	Valerio Cleri	Italy
2011	Keri-Anne Payne	United Kingdom	Thomas Lurz; Spyridon Gianniotis	Germany; Greece
2012	Éva Risztov	Hungary	Oussama Mellouli	Tunisia
2013	Poliana Okimoto	Brazil	Thomas Lurz	Germany
2014	Sharon van Rouwendaal	Netherlands	Andrew Gemmell	United States
2015	Aurélie Muller	France	Jordan Wilimovsky	United States
2016	Sharon van Rouwendaal	Netherlands	Ferry Weertman	Netherlands
2017	Aurélie Muller	France	Ferry Weertman	Netherlands
2018	Sharon van Rouwendaal	Netherlands	Kristof Rasovszky	Hungary
2019	Ana Marcela Cunha	Brazil	Florian Wellbrock	Germany
2020	Not awarded due to COVID-19 pandemic			
2021	Ana Marcela Cunha	Brazil	Florian Wellbrock	Germany
2022	Ana Marcela Cunha	Brazil	Gregorio Paltrinieri	Italy
2023	Leonie Beck	Germany	Florian Wellbrock	Germany

== World Disabled Swimmers of the Year ==
This award was created in 2003, and then was not awarded in 2004. The award has been won by American swimmers six times, Brazilian and Australian swimmers four times, and Canadian swimmers twice.

World Disabled Swimmers of the Year
Year	Female winner	Nationality	Male winner	Nationality
2003	Danielle Watts	United Kingdom	Sergei Punko	Belarus
2004	Not awarded	N/A	Not awarded	N/A
2005	Erin Popovich	United States	Benoît Huot	Canada
2006	Jessica Long	United States	Wang Xiaofu	China
2007	Valérie Grand'Maison	Canada	Matthew Cowdrey	Australia
2008	Natalie du Toit	South Africa	Matthew Cowdrey	Australia
2009	Mallory Weggemann	United States	Daniel Dias	Brazil
2010	Mallory Weggemann	United States	Daniel Dias	Brazil
2011	Jessica Long	United States	Daniel Dias	Brazil
2012	Jacqueline Freney	Australia	Matthew Cowdrey	Australia
2013	Sophie Pascoe	New Zealand	Daniel Dias	Brazil
2014	Ingrid Thunem	Norway	Ian Silverman	United States
2015	Rebecca Meyers	United States	Ihar Boki	Belarus
2016	Aurélie Rivard	Canada	Daniel Dias	Brazil
2017	Sophie Pascoe	New Zealand	Vincenzo Boni	Italy
2018	Carlotta Gilli	Italy	Ihar Boki	Belarus
2019	Sophie Pascoe	New Zealand	Reece Dunn	United Kingdom
2020	Not awarded due to COVID-19 pandemic			
2021	Jessica Long	United States	Maksym Krypak	Ukraine
2022	Not awarded			
2023	Carlotta Gilli	Italy	Andrii Trusov	Ukraine

== World Water Polo Players of the Year ==
The Water Polo award was introduced in 2011.

World Water Polo Players of the Year
Year	Female winner	Nationality	Male winner	Nationality
2011	Krystina Alogbo	Canada	Aleksandar Ivović	Montenegro
2012	Maggie Steffens	United States	Maro Joković	Croatia
2013	Jennifer Pareja	Spain	Viktor Nagy	Hungary
2014	Ashleigh Johnson	United States	Filip Filipović	Serbia
2015	Ashleigh Johnson	United States	Duško Pijetlović	Serbia
2016	Ashleigh Johnson	United States	Filip Filipović	Serbia
2017	Maggie Steffens	United States	Márton Vámos	Hungary
2018	Sabrina van der Sloot	Netherlands	Aleksandar Ivović	Montenegro
2019	Ashleigh Johnson	United States	Francesco Di Fulvio	Italy
2020	Not awarded due to COVID-19 pandemic			
2021	Maddie Musselman	United States	Filip Filipović	Serbia
2022	Not awarded			
2023	Judith Forca	Spain	Gergő Zalánki	Hungary
2024	Beatriz Ortiz	Spain	Dušan Mandić	Serbia

== See also ==
- List of FINA Athletes of the Year
- International Swimming Hall of Fame
