= 2006 FINA World Open Water Swimming Championships =

Swimming competition in Naples, Italy

The 4th FINA Open Water Swimming World Championships were held August 29-September 3, 2006 in Naples, Italy.

The championships featured 98 swimmers from 29 countries competing in race distances of 5-kilometer (5K), 10-kilometer (10K) and 25-kilometer (25K). Event schedule:

- Tuesday, August 29: Women's 5K, Men's 5K
- Thursday, August 31: Men's 10K, Women's 5K
- Saturday, September 2: Women's 25K
- Sunday, September 3: Men's 25K

== Results ==
Event	Gold		Silver		Bronze	
Women's 5K details	Larisa Ilchenko; Russia	1:08:19.7	Poliana Okimoto; Brazil	1:08:27.6	Britta Kamrau-Corestein; Germany	1:08:46.3
Men's 5K details	Thomas Lurz; Germany	1:04:32.3	Chip Peterson (United States) USA	1:04:32.7	Simone Ercoli; Italy	1:04:35.9
Women's 10K details	Larisa Ilchenko; Russia	2:19:40.9	Poliana Okimoto; Brazil	2:19:59.3	Ksenia Popova; Russia	2:19:59.8
Men's 10K details	Thomas Lurz; Germany	2:10:39.4	Valerio Cleri; Italy	2:10:40.5	Evgeny Drattsev; Russia	2:10:40.7
Women's 25K details	Angela Maurer; Germany	6:22:46.9	Natalia Pankina; Russia	6:22:47.8	Ksenia Popova; Russia	6:22:51.3
Men's 25K details	Josh Santacaterina; Australia	5:47:34.1	Yuri Kudinov; Russia	5:48:56.9	Petar Stoychev; Bulgaria	5:49:00.2

== Team standings ==
The Championship Trophy point standing for the 2006 Open Water Worlds is:

Rank	Nation	Men	Women	Combined
1	Russia	47	86	133
2	Germany	45	54	99
3	Italy	67	21	88
4	Australia	39	34	73
5	USA	24	31	55
6	Brazil	0	34	34
7	Czech Republic	4	18	22
8	Netherlands	18	0	18
9	Great Britain	7	9	16
9	France	16	0	16
11	Bulgaria	14	0	14
12	Egypt	10	0	10
13	Ukraine	5	3	8
14	Slovenia	0	4	4
15	Mexico	1	0	1

The following 13 countries are listed in a tie for 16, with zero (0) points:

- Argentina
- Canada
- Croatia
- Cuba
- Ecuador
- Hungary
- Israel
- Japan
- (North Macedonia) Macedonia
- New Zealand
- South Africa
- Syria
- Venezuela

Note: Serbia and Montenegro is the sole country with an entry not listed in the standings. Their lone entrant (Darjia Pop) did not finish the one event (Women's 10K) in which she was entered.

== See also ==
- 2004 FINA World Open Water Swimming Championships
- 2008 FINA World Open Water Swimming Championships
