= Natalia Pankina =

Russian swimmer

Personal information
- Born: 1983 (age 42–43)

Sport
- Sport: Swimming
Medal record
Representing Russia
World Championships
Bronze medal – third place	2004 Dubai	25 km open water
Silver medal – second place	2006 Napoli	25 km open water
Bronze medal – third place	2008 Sevilla	25 km open water
European Championships
Silver medal – second place	2004 Madrid	25 km open water
Silver medal – second place	2006 Budapest	25 km open water
Bronze medal – third place	2002 Potsdam	25 km open water

Natalia ("Natalya") Pankina (Russian: Наталья Панкина, born 1983) is a Russian long distance swimmer. She was the first Russian woman who successfully swam the English Channel in 2007 in a time of 8 h 11 mins.

Natalya is multiple Winner and Medalists for FINA Open Water Grand Prix and World Cups during the period of 1999-2009. She narrowly missed a medal in the 2007 World Championships, coming 5th in the 25 km open water event, just 10 seconds behind 3rd place. As a 1st Russian Woman, Natalya won the Overall at FINA Open Water Grand Prix 2008
