= Ksenia Popova =

Russian swimmer

Personal information
- Nationality: Russia
- Born: 1988 (age 37–38)

Sport
- Sport: Swimming
- Strokes: Open Water
Medal record
World Championships
Bronze medal – third place	Melbourne 2007	25K
Open Water Worlds
Gold medal – first place	Sevilla 2008	25K
Silver medal – second place	Dubai 2004	5K
Bronze medal – third place	Napoli 2006	10K
Bronze medal – third place	Napoli 2006	25K

Ksenia Popova (born 1988) is a World Champion open water swimmer from Russia. At the 2008 Open Water Worlds, she won the Women's 25K race.

She has swum for Russia at the:

- World Championships: 2003, 2007
- Open Water Worlds: 2004, 2006, 2008
