= Open water swimming at the 2007 World Aquatics Championships – Women's 25 km =

Women's 25 km at the 2007 World Aquatics Championships
- Venue: St Kilda Beach
- Location: Melbourne
- Dates: 25 March

The Women's 25 km Open Water event at the 2007 World Aquatics Championships was held on 25 March 2007 at St Kilda Beach, in Melbourne, Australia.

== Result ==
#	Name	Country	Time	Pts
1	Britta Kamrau-Corestein	Germany	5:37:11.66	18
2	Kalyn Keller	United States	5:39:39.62	16
3	Ksenia Popova	Russia	5:39:51.51	14
4	Angela Maurer	Germany	5:40:00.13	12
5	Natalia Pankina	Russia	5:40:01.87	10
6	Jana Pechanová	Czech Republic	5:47:23.28	8
7	Shelley Clark	Australia	5:47:24.88	6
8	Laura la Piana	Italy	6:07:21.71	5
9	Malwina Bukszowana	Poland	6:11:31.54	4
10	Evelien Sohl	Netherlands	6:24:25.82	3
	Alessandra Romiti	Italy	DNF	
	Darija Pop	Montenegro	DNF	
	Eva Berglund	Sweden	DNF	
