= Larisa Ilchenko =

Russian swimmer

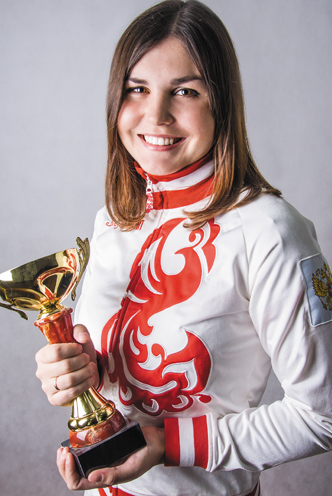

Personal information
- Born: 18 November 1988 (age 37) Volgograd, Russian SFSR, Soviet Union
- Height: 171 cm (5 ft 7 in)
- Weight: 58 kg (128 lb)

Sport
- Sport: Swimming
- Club: Volga Swimming Club
Medal record
Women's Open water
Representing Russia
Event	1st	2nd	3rd
Olympic Games	1	0	0
World Championships	8	1	1
European Championships	0	0	1
Universiade	0	0	0
Total	9	1	2
Olympic Games
Gold medal – first place	2008 Beijing	10 km
World Championships
Gold medal – first place	2004 Dubai	5 km
Gold medal – first place	2005 Montreal	5 km
Gold medal – first place	2006 Napoli	5 km
Gold medal – first place	2006 Napoli	10 km
Gold medal – first place	2007 Melbourne	5 km
Gold medal – first place	2007 Melbourne	10 km
Gold medal – first place	2008 Seville	5 km
Gold medal – first place	2008 Seville	10 km
Silver medal – second place	2009 Rome	5 km
Bronze medal – third place	2004 Dubai	Team 5 km
European Championships
Bronze medal – third place	2006 Budapest	5 km

Larisa Dmitriyevna Ilchenko (Russian: Лариса Дмитриевна Ильченко; born 18 November 1988) is a Russian long-distance swimmer. She won eight world titles and a gold medal at the 2008 Olympics.

== Biography ==
Ilchenko dominated long distance swimming since her first World Championships in Dubai, 2004, where, aged just 16 won by over 30 seconds. The following year in Montreal, she had a much tougher time as the veterans pushed her under and held her up, but still won with a final sprint. This was the pattern of all her subsequent victories, battling her way through the pack before sprinting clear at the end. She doubled up in Napoli 2006 to become both the 5 km and 10 km open water world champion. She won both 5 km and 10 km events at the 2007 and 2008 World Championships too. The American magazine Swimming World named her open water swimmer of the year in 2006, 2007 and 2008.

She won the gold medal at the 2008 Beijing Olympics in the swimming 10 km, using her trademark closing kick after being behind the leaders for 9,900 meters of the 10,000-meter swim. For this and other achievements, she was awarded the Order of Friendship in 2009.

After sustaining an injury in 2009 and hypothermia at the 2010 World Open Water Swimming Championships, she de facto retired. In August 2012 she married a Russian swimmer Sergey Perunin. In September 2012 she was inducted to the International Marathon Swimming Hall of Fame. And in 2016 she was inducted to the International Swimming Hall of Fame.

== International medals ==
She won 10 medals at the World Open Water Swimming Championships.

Championship	Edition	5 km	10 km	Team 5 km
Olympic Games	(China) 2008 Beijing		1st place, gold medalist(s)	
World Championships	(United Arab Emirates) 2004 Dubai	1st place, gold medalist(s)		3rd place, bronze medalist(s)
World Championships	(Canada) 2005 Montreal	1st place, gold medalist(s)		
World Championships	(Italy) 2006 Naples	1st place, gold medalist(s)	1st place, gold medalist(s)	
World Championships	(Australia) 2007 Melbourne	1st place, gold medalist(s)	1st place, gold medalist(s)	
World Championships	(Spain) 2008 Sevilla	1st place, gold medalist(s)	1st place, gold medalist(s)	
World Championships	(Italy) 2009 Rome	2nd place, silver medalist(s)		
European Championships	(Hungary) 2006 Budapest	3rd place, bronze medalist(s)		

== See also ==
- World Open Water Championships - Multiple medalists

Awards
Preceded by (Netherlands) Edith van Dijk	Swimming World Open Water Swimmer of the Year; 2006–2008	Succeeded by (United Kingdom) Keri-Anne Payne
