= Vladimir Dyatchin =

Russian long distance swimmer

Medal record

Men's swimming

Representing Russia

World Championships
Gold medal – first place	2003 Barcelona	10 km open water
Gold medal – first place	2007 Melbourne	10 km open water
Silver medal – second place	2001 Fukuoka	10 km open water
Silver medal – second place	2011 Shanghai	25 km open water
Bronze medal – third place	2003 Barcelona	5 km open water
Bronze medal – third place	2009 Rome	25 km open water

European Championships
Gold medal – first place	2002 Berlin	10 km open water

World Open Water Championships
Gold medal – first place	2008 Seville	10 km
Bronze medal – third place	2010 Roberval	10 km open water

European Open Water Championships
Silver medal – second place	2011 Eilat	10 km open water

Vladimir Fyodorovich Dyatchin (Russian: Владимир Фёдорович Дятчин) (born 14 October 1982, in Lipetsk) is a Russian long-distance swimmer. He won the 10 km open water at the 2007 World Aquatics Championships despite suffering 10-inch long lacerations on both of sides of his rib cage, caused by a jellyfish sting.

In 2007 he was voted as Swimming World's Open Water Swimmer of the Year.

== See also ==
- World Open Water Championships - Multiple medalists

Awards
Preceded by (Germany) Thomas Lurz	Swimming World Open Water Swimmer of the Year; 2007	Succeeded by (Netherlands) Maarten van der Weijden
