= Thomas Lurz =

German swimmer (born 1979)

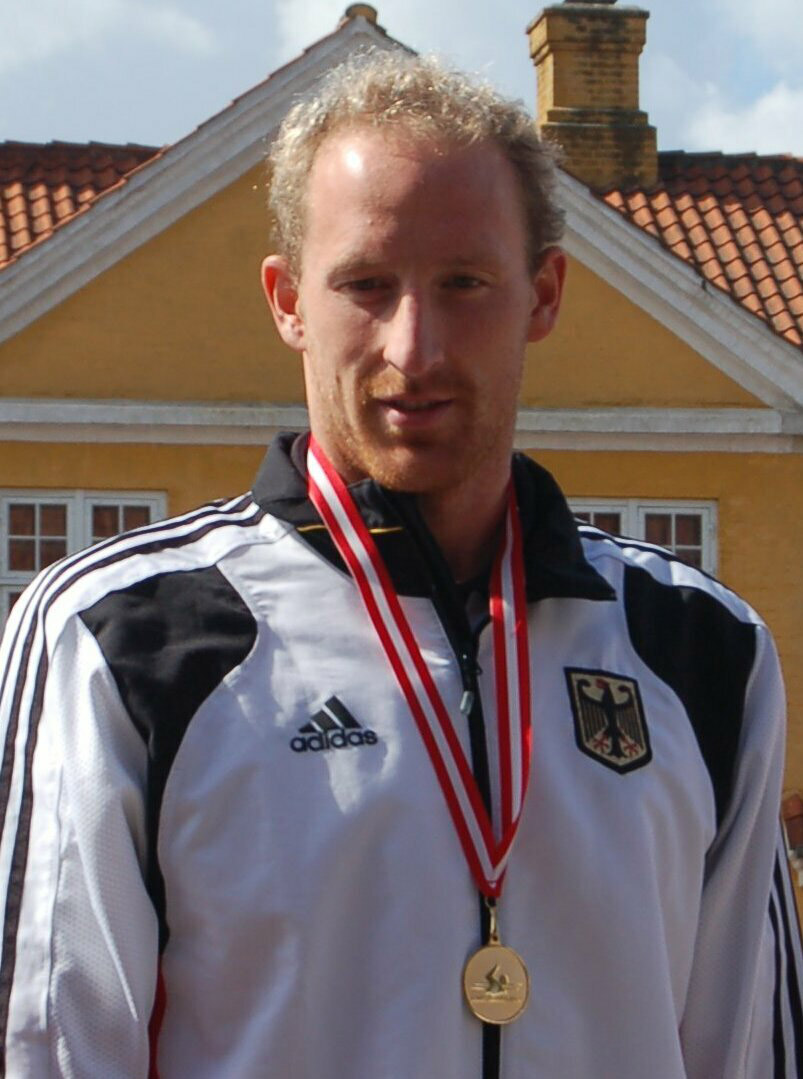

Personal information
- Full name: Thomas Lurz
- Nationality: German
- Born: 28 November 1979 (age 46) Würzburg, West Germany
- Height: 1.83 m (6 ft 0 in)
- Weight: 76 kg (168 lb)

Sport
- Sport: Swimming
- Strokes: Open water, freestyle
- Club: SV Würzburg 05
Medal record
Men's Open water
Representing Germany
| Event | 1st | 2nd | 3rd |
|---|---|---|---|
| Olympic Games | 0 | 1 | 1 |
| World Championships | 12 | 4 | 4 |
| European Championships | 5 | 2 | 4 |
| Universiade | 0 | 1 | 0 |
| Total | 17 | 8 | 9 |
Olympic Games
| Silver medal – second place | 2012 London | 10 km |
| Bronze medal – third place | 2008 Beijing | 10 km |
World Championships
| Gold medal – first place | 2005 Montreal | 5 km |
| Gold medal – first place | 2007 Melbourne | 5 km |
| Gold medal – first place | 2009 Rome | 5 km |
| Gold medal – first place | 2009 Rome | 10 km |
| Gold medal – first place | 2011 Shanghai | 5 km |
| Gold medal – first place | 2013 Barcelona | 25 km |
| Gold medal – first place | 2013 Barcelona | 5 km team |
| Silver medal – second place | 2005 Montreal | 10 km |
| Silver medal – second place | 2007 Melbourne | 10 km |
| Silver medal – second place | 2011 Shanghai | 10 km |
| Silver medal – second place | 2013 Barcelona | 10 km |
| Bronze medal – third place | 2011 Shanghai | 5 km team |
| Bronze medal – third place | 2013 Barcelona | 5 km |
World Open Water Championships
| Gold medal – first place | 2004 Dubai | 10 km |
| Gold medal – first place | 2006 Naples | 5 km |
| Gold medal – first place | 2006 Naples | 10 km |
| Gold medal – first place | 2008 Seville | 5 km |
| Gold medal – first place | 2010 Roberval | 5 km |
| Bronze medal – third place | 2002 Sharm el-Sheikh | 5 km |
| Bronze medal – third place | 2008 Seville | 10 km |
European Championships
| Gold medal – first place | 2006 Budapest | 5 km |
| Gold medal – first place | 2006 Budapest | 10 km |
| Gold medal – first place | 2008 Dubrovnik | 10 km |
| Gold medal – first place | 2010 Budapest | 10 km |
| Gold medal – first place | 2011 Eilat | 10 km |
| Silver medal – second place | 2002 Berlin | 5 km |
| Silver medal – second place | 2014 Berlin | 10 km |
| Bronze medal – third place | 2008 Dubrovnik | 5 km |
| Bronze medal – third place | 2008 Dubrovnik | 5 km team |
| Bronze medal – third place | 2014 Berlin | 5 km |
| Bronze medal – third place | 2014 Berlin | 5 km team |
Summer Universiade
| Silver medal – second place | 2005 Izmir | 1500 m freestyle |

Thomas Lurz (born 28 November 1979) is a German former competitive swimmer who specialised in long-distance freestyle swimming, especially open water swimming. Lurz represented the SV Würzburg 05 sports club and resides in Gerbrunn.

Lurz won 2 olympic medals in the 10 km open water, 7 gold medals at the World Aquatics Championships and 5 gold medals at the World Open Water Championships.

== Biography ==
He competed for Germany at the 2004 Summer Olympics in the 1500 m freestyle, where he finished 22nd and missed the final. He returned to the 2008 Summer Olympics, where he won a bronze medal in the 10 km open water race. At the 2012 Summer Olympics, he finished one place higher, claiming the silver medal. He was the world champion in the 10 km open-water swimming event in 2004, 2006 and 2009. From to 2005 to 2011, he won gold in the 5 km event seven times in a row. In May 2015, Lurz retired from competitive swimming at the age of 35.

Lurz won ten German titles for 800 m, 1500 m, 5000 m and 10,000 m (open-water) freestyle Lurz was the winner of the European Open Water Competition 2005

== Honours ==
Swimming World Magazine Open Water Swimmer of the Year: 2005^{[a]}, 2006, 2009, 2011^{[b]} & 2013

^{a} Joint winner with Chip Peterson
^{b} Joint winner with Spyridon Gianniotis

== See also ==
- World Open Water Championships - Multiple medalists
- German records in swimming

Awards
| Preceded by None (Netherlands) Maarten van der Weijden (Italy) Valerio Cleri | World Open Water Swimmer of the Year; 2005 (with (United States) Chip Peterson), 2006; 2009; 2011 (with (Greece) Spyridon Gianniotis) | Succeeded by (Russia) Vladimir Dyatchin (Italy) Valerio Cleri (Tunisia) Oussama Mellouli |
| Preceded by (Italy) Valerio Cleri (Tunisia) Oussama Mellouli | FINA Open Water Swimmer of the Year; 2011; 2013 | Succeeded by (Tunisia) Oussama Mellouli (Brazil) Allan do Carmo |
