= Mark Warkentin =

American swimmer and coach

Personal information
- National team: United States
- Born: November 14, 1979 (age 46) Santa Barbara, California, U.S.
- Height: 6 ft 2 in (188 cm)
- Weight: 185 lb (84 kg)

Sport
- Sport: Swimming
- Club: Santa Barbara Swim Club
- College team: University of Southern California
Medal record
Men's swimming
Representing the United States
Open Water Championships
Silver medal – second place	2008 Seville	25 km open water
Summer Universiade
Gold medal – first place	1999 Palma	200 m freestyle
Gold medal – first place	1999 Palma	400 m freestyle
Gold medal – first place	1999 Palma	800 m freestyle
Gold medal – first place	1999 Palma	4x200 m freestyle
Silver medal – second place	2001 Beijing	4x200 m freestyle

Mark Warkentin (born November 14, 1979) is an American open water swimmer and swimming coach.

After graduating from San Marcos High School in 1998, Warkentin attended the University of Southern California, from which he graduated in 2003 with a degree in communication. While a Trojan, he was a four-time All-American. He was also awarded USC's Willis Award as a freshman.

Warkentin qualified for the 2008 Summer Olympics in Beijing following his performance at the 2008 Open Water World Championships. In the lead-up to the Games he was noted by Time as one of its "100 Olympic Athletes To Watch." He is a two-time national champion in the open water 25-kilometer, the longest sanctioned race in the sport. The open water event at the Olympics was a 10-kilometer race, which typically lasts around two hours. Warkentin finished in eighth place with a time of 1:52:13.0, just twenty-one seconds behind winner Maarten van der Weijden. Warkentin became head coach of the Santa Barbara Swim Club on December 1, 2012, returning to lead his childhood team.

== See also ==
- List of University of Southern California people
