= Marco Formentini (swimmer) =

Italian swimmer (born 1970)

Personal information
- Born: 3 July 1970 (age 55)
Medal record
Men's swimming
Representing Italy
World Championships
Silver medal – second place	2007 Melbourne	25 km open water
Bronze medal – third place	2001 Fukuoka	5 km open water
European Championships
Gold medal – first place	1993 Slapy	5 km open water
Summer Universiade
Silver medal – second place	1993 Buffalo	1500 m freestyle
Silver medal – second place	1997 Catania	1500 m freestyle
Bronze medal – third place	1997 Catania	800 m freestyle

Marco Formentini (born 3 July 1970 in Lavagna, Genova) is a male freestyle swimmer from Italy. He also competes in the open water swimming, winning a silver and a bronze medal at the World Aquatics Championships.

Formentini competed for his native country at the 1996 Summer Olympics in Atlanta, Georgia, finishing in 18th place in the men's 1500 m freestyle event. He was affiliated with Gruppo Sportivo Carabinieri and Rari Nantes Savona in the 1990s.
