= Francisco Hervás (swimmer) =

Spanish swimmer

Personal information
- Born: August 16, 1981 (age 45) Esplugues de Llobregat, Spain

Sport
- Sport: Swimming

Francisco José "Kiko" Hervás Jodar (born 16 August 1981) is a Spanish swimmer. He competed at the 2008 Summer Olympics in Beijing where he finished 13th in the 10 km.

In the same event at the 2012 Summer Olympics, he finished in 23rd place.
