= Daniel Delgadillo (swimmer) =

Mexican swimmer

Personal information
- Nationality: Mexico
- Born: 27 September 1989 (age 36) San Luis Potosí, Mexico
- Height: 1.72 m (5 ft 8 in)
- Weight: 72 kg (159 lb)

Sport
- Sport: Swimming
- Event: 10km Swim Marathon (Open Water)
Medal record
Men's open water swimming
Representing Mexico
Central American and Caribbean Games
Gold medal – first place	2023 San Salvador	Mixed relay
Silver medal – second place	2023 San Salvador	5 km
Silver medal – second place	2023 San Salvador	10 km

Daniel Delgadillo Faisal (born 27 September 1989) is a Mexican marathon swimmer. He competed in the 2020 Summer Olympics.
