= Rostislav Vítek =

Czech swimmer

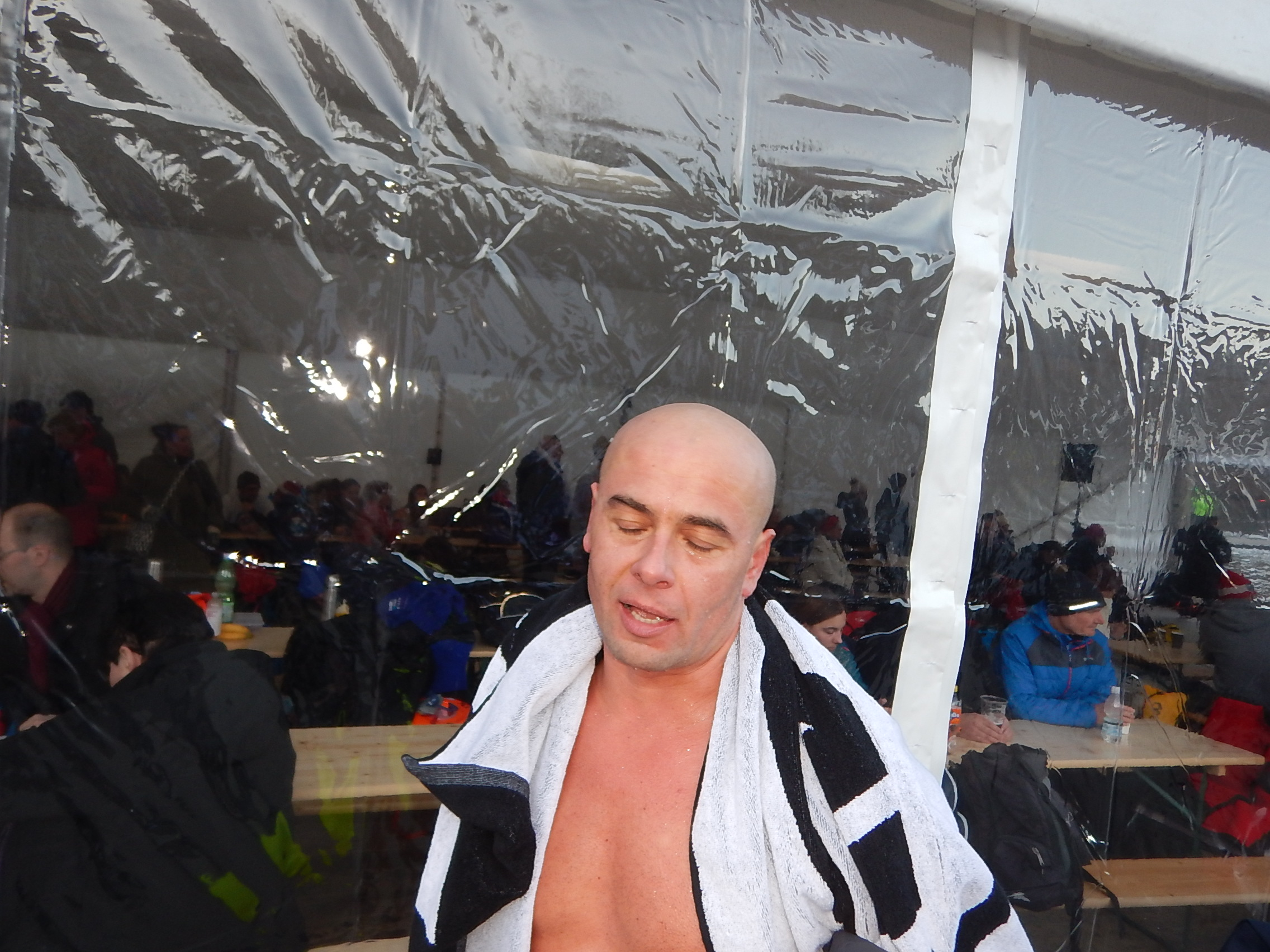

Personal information
- Full name: Rostislav Vítek
- National team: Czech Republic
- Born: 6 January 1976 (age 50) Příbram, Czechoslovakia
- Height: 1.82 m (6 ft 0 in)
- Weight: 78 kg (172 lb)

Sport
- Sport: Swimming
- Strokes: Open water
- Club: Kometa Brno
- Coach: Zdenek Tobiás

Rostislav Vítek (born 6 January 1976) is a Czech swimmer, who specialized in open water marathon. He represented his nation Czech Republic at the 2008 Summer Olympics, and eventually became the nation's first ever swimmer to cross the English Channel with a remarkable seven-hour record.

Vitek competed as a lone open water swimmer for the Czech Republic in the inaugural men's 10 km marathon at the 2008 Summer Olympics in Beijing. Leading up to the Games, he scored a third-place time in 1:59:35.5 to claim the bronze medal and enter the top ten field at the 10 km Marathon Swimming Olympic test event in Shunyi Olympic Rowing-Canoeing Park. Farther from the leaders by about eight body lengths, Vítek pulled away from the bottom of the field to drop beneath a 1:53 threshold for the seventeenth spot with a time of 1:52:41.8, about fifty seconds behind winner Maarten van der Weijden of the Netherlands.

In 2009, Vitek successfully swam the English Channel at 7 hours, 16 minutes, and 25 seconds, which eventually became the fourth fastest solo single-crossing of all time. Because of his outstanding achievement and full commitment to the sport, he was nominated as 2009 World Open Water Swimming Performer of the Year.
