= Josh Santacaterina =

Australian swimmer

Personal information
- Nationality: Australia
- Born: 21 May 1980 (age 46)

Sport
- Sport: Swimming
- Strokes: Open Water
- Club: St. Peter's Western
Medal record
Open Water Worlds
Gold medal – first place	Napoli 2006	25 km
Bronze medal – third place	Dubai 2004	5 km

Josh Santacaterina (born 21 May 1980) is a World Champion open water swimmer from Australia. At the 2006 Open Water Worlds, he won the Men's 25 km race.

He has swum for Australia at the:

- World Championships: 2003, 2005, 2007
- Open Water Worlds: 2000, 2004, 2006, 2008
