= Alan Bircher =

British former long-distance swimmer

Personal information
- Born: 21 September 1981 (age 44)
Medal record
Men's swimming
Representing Great Britain
European Championships
Silver medal – second place	2004 Madrid	5 km open water
FINA World Championships
Silver medal – second place	2004 Dubai	10 km open water

Alan Bircher (born 21 September 1981) is a British swimming coach and former long-distance swimmer. He competed in six world championships between 2001 and 2008 and is a former coach of Olympic gold medalist Freya Anderson.

In 2004, Bircher placed second in the 10 kilometer event at the FINA Marathon Swim World Series and second in the 5 kilometer event at the LEN European Aquatics Championships.

From 2011 to 2022, Bircher was the coach of the Ellesmere College Titans (ECTM) swim club.

== Controversy ==
Bircher was criticized for facilitating a body-shaming culture among his preteen and teenage female swimmers. In 2021, Bircher was blocked from joining Team GB's Tokyo coaching squad. Though a group of eighty former Ellesmere swimmers signed a letter stating that no wrongdoing had occurred, one former swimmer alleged that Bircher weighed his team weekly from an early age. An independent investigation found 70 complaints about behavior across the Titans coaching staff and led Ellesmere College to shut down the club in 2022.
