= Csaba Gercsák =

Hungarian swimmer (born 1988)

Personal information
- Nationality: Hungarian
- Born: 19 August 1988 (age 37) Budapest, Hungary
- Height: 1.71 m (5 ft 7 in)
- Weight: 65 kg (143 lb)

Sport
- Sport: Swimming
- Strokes: Open water, freestyle
- Club: Jövő SC
- College team: Southern Illinois University
Medal record
World Championships
Bronze medal – third place	2011 Shanghai	25 km open water
- Updated on 23 July 2011

Csaba Gercsák (born 19 August 1988 in Budapest) is a Hungarian long-distance swimmer and Olympic participant, who won the bronze medal at the 2011 World Aquatics Championships in the 25 km open water event.

He has swum for Hungary in:

- Olympics: 2008, 2012
- World Championships: 2005, 2007, 2009, 2011
- Open Water Worlds: 2006, 2008

== Awards and recognition ==
- Hungarian Long Distance Swimmer of the Year: 2007, 2008, 2009, 2010
