= Maarten van der Weijden =

Dutch swimmer

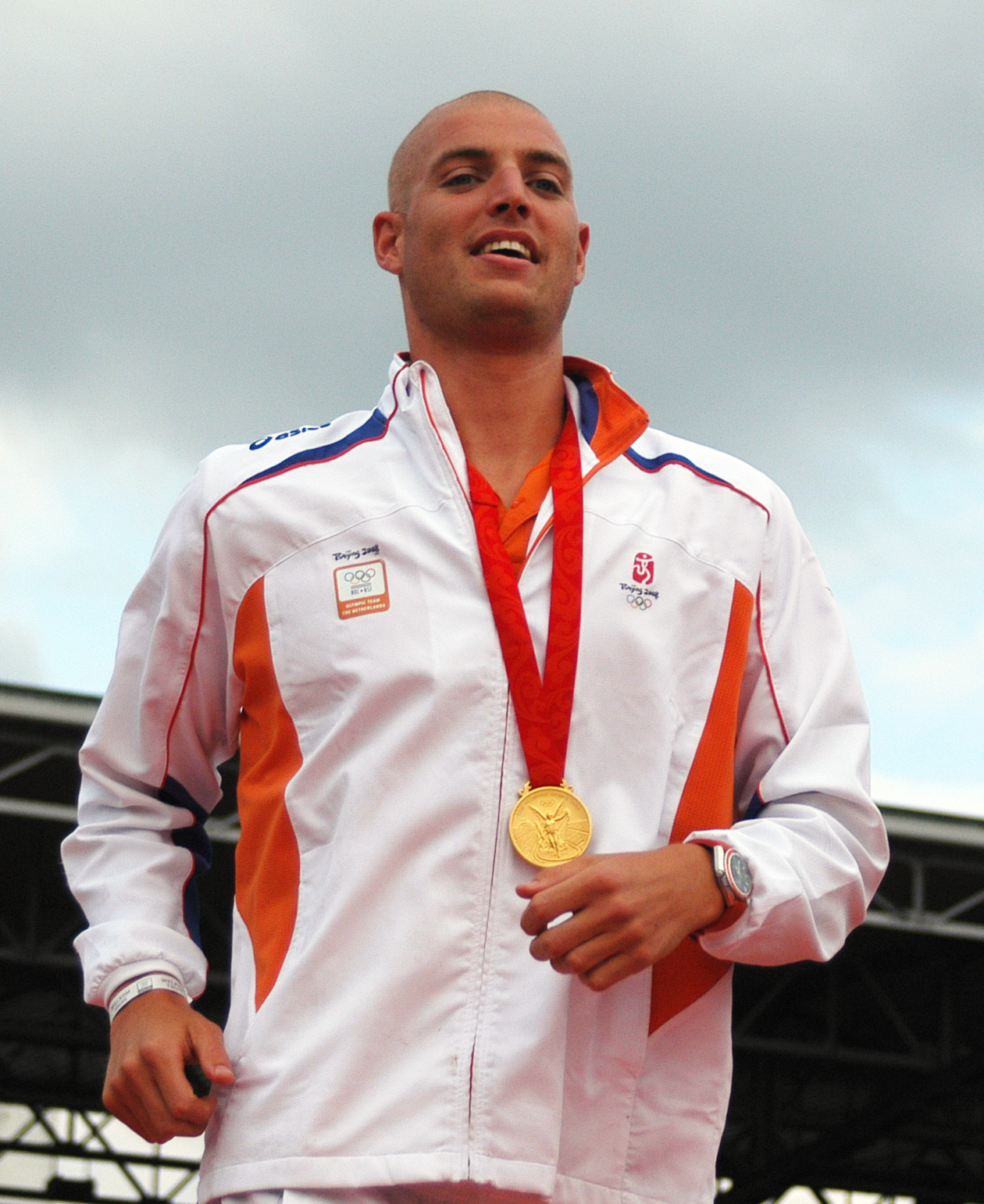
- van der Weijden in 2008

Personal information
- Full name: Maarten van der Weijden
- Nationality: Netherlands
- Born: 31 March 1981 (age 45) Alkmaar, Netherlands
- Height: 2.02 m (6 ft 8 in)
- Weight: 93 kg (205 lb)
- Website: MaartenVanDerWeijden.com

Sport
- Sport: Swimming
- Strokes: Open Water
- Club: Nationaal Zweminstituut Eindhoven
Medal record
Men's open water
Representing the Netherlands
Olympic Games
Gold medal – first place	2008 Beijing	10 km open water
World Championships
Gold medal – first place	2008 Seville	25 km open water
Bronze medal – third place	2008 Seville	5 km open water
European Championships
Silver medal – second place	2006 Budapest	10 km open water

Maarten van der Weijden (born 31 March 1981) is a Dutch former long-distance and marathon swimmer born in Alkmaar. Van der Weijden won the Olympic gold in the 10 km open water marathon at the 2008 Summer Olympics in Beijing. In 2019, he swam the Elfstedentocht for charity, in which he raised more than €6.1 million.

== Swimming career ==
Van der Weijden was known as a promising swimming talent in his youth, becoming Dutch national champion in the 1500 m freestyle (1998 (short course and long course), 1999 (lc) and 2000 (lc)), 400 m freestyle (1999 (sc+lc) and 2000 (lc)) and 5 km open water (2000). He also participated at the 1999 European Junior Championships and the 2000 Open Water World Championships. In 2001, he was confronted with leukemia and his career was likely to be over. After surviving cancer, he made his comeback in 2003. He qualified for the Open Water World Championships in Barcelona and won another three Dutch titles; 800 m freestyle (sc+lc) and 1500 m freestyle (lc). He became seventh over 10 and 25 kilometres at the 2004 World Open Water Championships and added a Dutch title at the 800 m freestyle (lc) and 25 km open water.

Later in 2004, he swam across the IJsselmeer in 4:20.58 hours, breaking the former record by almost 15 minutes to collect €50,000, which he donated to cancer research. In 2005, he won the Dutch title over 400 m freestyle (sc) for the second time in his career. He finished in fifth position at the World Open Water Championships over 10 km and sixth over 25 km. He also won three World Cup meetings in Ismaila, Al Fujeirah and Dubai. In 2006 he won a silver medal at the 2006 European Aquatics Championships over 10 km.

Van der Weijden had his own website named "Maarten van der Weijden zwemt tegen kanker" (Maarten van der Weijden swims against cancer) where he informed his fans about his life and his career. He also collected more money for cancer research. He won another World Cup race in Rosario, Argentina in January 2007. At the end of the World Cup calendar he finished in second position overall and during the 2007 World Championships over 10 km he finished seventh.

His aim was to become World Champion, which he achieved when he won the 25 km at the 2008 World Championships in Seville. He also won a bronze medal in the 5 km and finished fourth in the 10 km, the latter result qualifying him for the 10 km open water marathon at the 2008 Summer Olympics. In Beijing, he won the Olympic gold medal in the 10 km, narrowly edging out David Davies of Great Britain.

He announced the end of his professional swimming career during his acceptance speech as Dutch Sportsman of the year in 2008.

On 22–23 May 2017, in Amsterdam, Van der Weijden attempted to break the world record for 24 hours swimming. He finished the nonstop swimming marathon, but he did not succeed in breaking the world record of 102 kilometers. He completed 99.5 kilometers in 24 hours. With this achievement he collected €8,500 for the benefit of cancer research. In March 2018 he tried to break the world record again: he succeeded by swimming 102.8 kilometers in 24 hours.

=== Elfstedentocht ===
In August 2018, Van der Weijden started an attempt to swim the entire track of the Elfstedentocht, a famous 200 km outdoor ice skating race in the north of the Netherlands. The purpose of this event was to raise funds for cancer research. Sponsors were invited to swim along with him for portions of the distance. The day before the event, the organizers and health experts concluded that due to E. coli the water quality was too poor for the sponsors to swim; Van der Weijden decided to make his attempt, without the sponsors swimming along. He scheduled this attempt to take three days, while only taking short naps - but taking slightly longer (three hour) breaks was necessary to continue. The attempt was live streamed by the national broadcaster NOS on their website and closely followed in national news. Eventually, with less than 10 km left to Dokkum, he had to cut his attempt short due to illness sustained in the water. At that moment, he already had swum a distance of 163 km in 55 hours time raising over €4,3 million for cancer charities. By October the total had reached €5 million.

On 27 March 2019 Van der Weijden announced that on 21 June 2019 he would start a second attempt to swim the whole eleven-city tour. His second attempt turned out to be successful. Van der Weijden arrived after 74 hours and 4 minutes at the finish in Leeuwarden on 24 June 2019. By the end of his swim, he had raised €3,910,763.11 for cancer charities. By the next day, 25 June, it was announced that €5.1 million had come in. On 28 June the total had reached over €6.1 million.

In June 2023 he was the second person to do the "Elfsteden" track as a triathlon. First swimming the total 200 km, followed by 200 km cycling and finally the 200 km walking, again raising money for cancer research.

== Electoral history ==
Electoral history of Maarten van der Weijden
Year	Body	Party	Pos.	Votes	Result		Ref.
Year	Body	Party	Pos.	Votes	Party seats	Individual	Ref.
2017	House of Representatives	People's Party for Freedom and Democracy	80 (Note: Van der Weijden participated as lijstduwer.)	2,217	33	Lost	
2021	House of Representatives	People's Party for Freedom and Democracy	80	4,116	34	Lost	
2023	House of Representatives	People's Party for Freedom and Democracy	80	3,657	24	Lost	

== See also ==
- List of Dutch records in swimming

== Notes ==
Awards
Preceded by Sven Kramer	Dutch Sportsman of the Year; 2008	Succeeded by Epke Zonderland
Preceded by (Russia) Vladimir Dyatchin	World's Open Water Swimmer of the Year; 2008	Succeeded by Thomas Lurz
