= 2008 FINA World Open Water Swimming Championships =

Swimming competition in Seville, Spain

The 5th FINA World Open Water Swimming Championships were held May 3–8, 2008 in Seville, Spain. The races were held on a 2.5-kilometer loop-course in the Guadalquivir river in the city center.

A total of 165 swimmers (81 females, 84 males) were entered into the 6 races at the 2008 Open Water Worlds:

- Saturday, May 3: women's 10K
- Sunday, May 4: men's 10K
- Tuesday, May 6: women's 5K, men's 5K
- Thursday, May 8: women's 25K, men's 25K

The 10K races served as the initial qualifier for the 10K race at the 2008 Olympics.

== Results ==
Event	Gold		Silver		Bronze	
Women's 5K details	Larisa Ilchenko; Russia	1:00:04.6	Ekaterina Seliverstova; Russia	1:00:07.8	Chloe Sutton (United States) USA	1:00:09.9
Men's 5K details	Thomas Lurz; Germany	54:57.3	Vladimir Dyatchin; Russia	54:58.8	Maarten van der Weijden; Netherlands	54:59.8
Women's 10K details	Larisa Ilchenko; Russia	2:02:02.7	Cassandra Patten (United Kingdom) Great Britain	2:02:05.8	Yurema Requena; Spain	2:02:07.2
Men's 10K details	Vladimir Dyatchin; Russia	1:53:21.0	David Davies (United Kingdom) Great Britain	1:53:21.3	Thomas Lurz; Germany	1:53:27.2
Women's 25K details	Ksenia Popova; Russia	5:27:48.2	Edith van Dijk; Netherlands	5:27:50.3	Natalya Pankina; Russia	5:27:53.9
Men's 25K details	Maarten van der Weijden; Netherlands	5:04:01.1	Mark Warkentin (United States) USA	5:04:01.6	Yuri Kudinov; Russia	5:04:02.4

== Team standings ==
The Championship Trophy point standing for the 2008 Open Water Worlds is:

Rank	Nation	Men	Women	Combined
1	Russia	63	84	147
2	Netherlands	48	30	78
3	Germany	42	14	56
4	USA	34	14	48
5	Spain	15	24	39
6	Australia	17	21	38
7	Great Britain	16	21	37
8	Czech Republic	3	21	24
9	Italy	15	6	21
10	France	2	16	18
11	Egypt	16	0	16
12	China	0	14	14
13	South Africa	0	12	12
13	Bulgaria	12	0	12
15	Brazil	0	11	11
16	Slovenia	0	8	8
17	Greece	4	0	4
17	Israel	4	0	4
19	Canada	3	0	3
19	Belgium	3	0	3
21	Sweden	0	1	1

The following 17 countries are listed in a tie for 22nd, with zero (0) points:

- Argentina
- Belarus
- Chile
- Croatia
- Guatemala
- Hong Kong
- Hungary
- (North Macedonia) FYR Macedonia
- Mexico
- Montenegro
- Poland
- Portugal
- Puerto Rico
- Syria
- Switzerland
- Ukraine
- Venezuela

== See also ==
- Open water swimming at the 2007 World Aquatics Championships (previous Worlds)
- 2008 Olympics: Women's 10K and Men's 10K
- Open water swimming at the 2009 World Aquatics Championships (subsequent Worlds)
- 2008 in swimming
