= Swimming at the World Aquatics Championships =

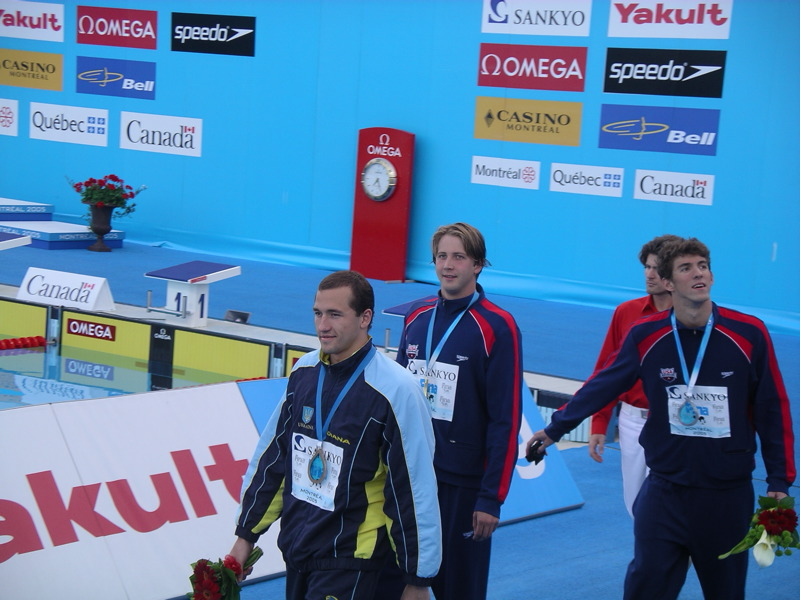
Michael Phelps—pictured here (right) at the 2005 World Championships—won 26 World Championships gold medals – more than any other athlete.

The aquatics discipline of swimming is considered the flagship event at every edition of the World Aquatics Championships since its introduction in 1973. While open water swimming events were added to the program in 1991, it is considered a separate discipline to swimming.

== Championships ==
Member federations referred to as winners, second, and third, in the table below, are the top three nation's listed on the medal tally based on the standard method of ranking (being total gold medals, followed by total silver medals, and then total bronze medals). This table includes medals won both in long course swimming and in open water swimming.

Year	Date	Edition	Location	Events (men/women/mixed)		Winner of the medal table	Second in the medal table	Third in the medal table
Year	Date	Edition	Location	Long course	Open water	Winner of the medal table	Second in the medal table	Third in the medal table
1973	31 August – 9 September	1	(Socialist Federal Republic of Yugoslavia) Belgrade, Yugoslavia	15 / 14 / 0	0 / 0 / 0	East Germany	United States	Australia
1975	19–27 July	2	Cali, Colombia	15 / 14 / 0	0 / 0 / 0	United States	East Germany	Hungary
1978	20–28 August	3	West Berlin, West Germany	15 / 14 / 0	0 / 0 / 0	United States	Soviet Union	Australia
1982	29 July – 8 August	4	Guayaquil, Ecuador	15 / 14 / 0	0 / 0 / 0	East Germany	United States	Soviet Union
1986	13–23 August	5	Madrid, Spain	16 / 16 / 0	0 / 0 / 0	East Germany (3)	United States	West Germany
1991	3–13 January	6	Perth, Australia	16 / 16 / 0	1 / 1 / 0	United States	Hungary	Germany
1994	1–11 September	7	Rome, Italy	16 / 16 / 0	1 / 1 / 0	China	Australia	United States
1998	8–17 January	8	Perth, Australia	16 / 16 / 0	2 / 2 / 2	United States	Australia	China
2001	16–29 July	9	Fukuoka, Japan	20 / 20 / 0	3 / 3 / 0	Australia	United States	Italy
2003	12–27 July	10	Barcelona, Spain	20 / 20 / 0	3 / 3 / 0	United States	Australia	Russia
2005	16–31 July	11	Montreal, Canada	20 / 20 / 0	3 / 3 / 0	United States	Australia	Germany
2007	18 March – 1 April	12	Melbourne, Australia	20 / 20 / 0	3 / 3 / 0	United States	Australia	Russia (2)
2009	17 July – 2 August	13	Rome, Italy	20 / 20 / 0	3 / 3 / 0	United States	Germany	Australia
2011	16–31 July	14	Shanghai, China	20 / 20 / 0	3 / 3 / 1	United States	China	Brazil
2013	19 July – 4 August	15	Barcelona, Spain	20 / 20 / 0	3 / 3 / 1	United States	China	France
2015	24 July – 9 August	16	Kazan, Russia	20 / 20 / 2	3 / 3 / 1	United States	Australia	China
2017	14–30 July	17	Budapest, Hungary	20 / 20 / 2	3 / 3 / 1	United States	France	Great Britain
2019	12–28 July	18	Gwangju, South Korea	20 / 20 / 2	3 / 3 / 1	United States	Australia (7)	Hungary (2)
2022	18 June – 3 July	19	Budapest, Hungary	20 / 20 / 2	3 / 3 / 1	United States	Italy	Australia
2023	14–30 July	20	Fukuoka, Japan	20 / 20 / 2	2 / 2 / 1	Australia	United States	China (3)
2024	2–18 February	21	Doha, Qatar	20 / 20 / 2	2 / 2 / 1	United States (15)	China (3)	Australia (5)
2025	11 July – 3 August	22	Singapore	20 / 20 / 2	3 / 3 / 1	Australia (3)	United States (6)	Germany (3)
2027	TBA	23	Budapest, Hungary	TBA	TBA	TBA	TBA	TBA
2029	TBA	24	Beijing, China	TBA	TBA	TBA	TBA	TBA

== Events ==
The number of events competed for at each edition of the championships has grown steadily through the years. In 1973, 29 events were swum: 15 for men and 14 for women, all in the pool. Since 2015, the combined number of events for men and women including pool and open water events has been 49, a drastic increase compared to the first edition. Historically, 53 different events have been held across the 22 editions of the championships.

=== Long course ===
Long course events have been competed since the inaugural edition of the championships in 1973. The youngest male swimmer to participate in the World Swimming Championships was Ahnt Khaung Htut from Myanmar, who was 12 years old in 2015. He took part at the 100m backstroke and 100m breaststroke events. The youngest female swimmer to participate in the World Swimming Championships was 10-year-old Alzain Tareq from Bahrain in 2015. She participated at the 50m butterfly and 50m freestyle events.

==== Men's events ====
Edition		1973	1975	1978	1982	1986	1991	1994	1998	2001	2003	2005	2007	2009	2011	2013	2015	2017	2019	2022	2023	2024	2025
Freestyle	50 m					X	X	X	X	X	X	X	X	X	X	X	X	X	X	X	X	X	X
Freestyle	100 m	X	X	X	X	X	X	X	X	X	X	X	X	X	X	X	X	X	X	X	X	X	X
Freestyle	200 m	X	X	X	X	X	X	X	X	X	X	X	X	X	X	X	X	X	X	X	X	X	X
Freestyle	400 m	X	X	X	X	X	X	X	X	X	X	X	X	X	X	X	X	X	X	X	X	X	X
Freestyle	800 m									X	X	X	X	X	X	X	X	X	X	X	X	X	X
Freestyle	1500 m	X	X	X	X	X	X	X	X	X	X	X	X	X	X	X	X	X	X	X	X	X	X
Backstroke	50 m									X	X	X	X	X	X	X	X	X	X	X	X	X	X
Backstroke	100 m	X	X	X	X	X	X	X	X	X	X	X	X	X	X	X	X	X	X	X	X	X	X
Backstroke	200 m	X	X	X	X	X	X	X	X	X	X	X	X	X	X	X	X	X	X	X	X	X	X
Breaststroke	50 m									X	X	X	X	X	X	X	X	X	X	X	X	X	X
Breaststroke	100 m	X	X	X	X	X	X	X	X	X	X	X	X	X	X	X	X	X	X	X	X	X	X
Breaststroke	200 m	X	X	X	X	X	X	X	X	X	X	X	X	X	X	X	X	X	X	X	X	X	X
Butterfly	50 m									X	X	X	X	X	X	X	X	X	X	X	X	X	X
Butterfly	100 m	X	X	X	X	X	X	X	X	X	X	X	X	X	X	X	X	X	X	X	X	X	X
Butterfly	200 m	X	X	X	X	X	X	X	X	X	X	X	X	X	X	X	X	X	X	X	X	X	X
Individual medley	200 m	X	X	X	X	X	X	X	X	X	X	X	X	X	X	X	X	X	X	X	X	X	X
Individual medley	400 m	X	X	X	X	X	X	X	X	X	X	X	X	X	X	X	X	X	X	X	X	X	X
Relays	4×100 m freestyle	X	X	X	X	X	X	X	X	X	X	X	X	X	X	X	X	X	X	X	X	X	X
Relays	4×200 m freestyle	X	X	X	X	X	X	X	X	X	X	X	X	X	X	X	X	X	X	X	X	X	X
Relays	4×100 m medley	X	X	X	X	X	X	X	X	X	X	X	X	X	X	X	X	X	X	X	X	X	X
Number of events		15	15	15	15	16	16	16	16	20	20	20	20	20	20	20	20	20	20	20	20	20	20

==== Women's events ====
Edition		1973	1975	1978	1982	1986	1991	1994	1998	2001	2003	2005	2007	2009	2011	2013	2015	2017	2019	2022	2023	2024	2025
Freestyle	50 m					X	X	X	X	X	X	X	X	X	X	X	X	X	X	X	X	X	X
Freestyle	100 m	X	X	X	X	X	X	X	X	X	X	X	X	X	X	X	X	X	X	X	X	X	X
Freestyle	200 m	X	X	X	X	X	X	X	X	X	X	X	X	X	X	X	X	X	X	X	X	X	X
Freestyle	400 m	X	X	X	X	X	X	X	X	X	X	X	X	X	X	X	X	X	X	X	X	X	X
Freestyle	800 m	X	X	X	X	X	X	X	X	X	X	X	X	X	X	X	X	X	X	X	X	X	X
Freestyle	1500 m									X	X	X	X	X	X	X	X	X	X	X	X	X	X
Backstroke	50 m									X	X	X	X	X	X	X	X	X	X	X	X	X	X
Backstroke	100 m	X	X	X	X	X	X	X	X	X	X	X	X	X	X	X	X	X	X	X	X	X	X
Backstroke	200 m	X	X	X	X	X	X	X	X	X	X	X	X	X	X	X	X	X	X	X	X	X	X
Breaststroke	50 m									X	X	X	X	X	X	X	X	X	X	X	X	X	X
Breaststroke	100 m	X	X	X	X	X	X	X	X	X	X	X	X	X	X	X	X	X	X	X	X	X	X
Breaststroke	200 m	X	X	X	X	X	X	X	X	X	X	X	X	X	X	X	X	X	X	X	X	X	X
Butterfly	50 m									X	X	X	X	X	X	X	X	X	X	X	X	X	X
Butterfly	100 m	X	X	X	X	X	X	X	X	X	X	X	X	X	X	X	X	X	X	X	X	X	X
Butterfly	200 m	X	X	X	X	X	X	X	X	X	X	X	X	X	X	X	X	X	X	X	X	X	X
Individual medley	200 m	X	X	X	X	X	X	X	X	X	X	X	X	X	X	X	X	X	X	X	X	X	X
Individual medley	400 m	X	X	X	X	X	X	X	X	X	X	X	X	X	X	X	X	X	X	X	X	X	X
Relays	4×100 m freestyle	X	X	X	X	X	X	X	X	X	X	X	X	X	X	X	X	X	X	X	X	X	X
Relays	4×200 m freestyle					X	X	X	X	X	X	X	X	X	X	X	X	X	X	X	X	X	X
Relays	4×100 m medley	X	X	X	X	X	X	X	X	X	X	X	X	X	X	X	X	X	X	X	X	X	X
Number of events		14	14	14	14	16	16	16	16	20	20	20	20	20	20	20	20	20	20	20	20	20	20

==== Mixed events ====
Edition		2015	2017	2019	2022	2023	2024	2025
Relays	4×100 m freestyle	X	X	X	X	X	X	X
Relays	4×100 m medley	X	X	X	X	X	X	X
Number of events		2	2	2	2	2	2	2

=== Open water ===
Open water events have been competed since the sixth edition of the championships in 1991.

==== Men's events ====
Edition	1991	1994	1998	2001	2003	2005	2007	2009	2011	2013	2015	2017	2019	2022	2023	2024	2025
3 km knockout sprints																	X
5 km			X	X	X	X	X	X	X	X	X	X	X	X	X	X	X
10 km				X	X	X	X	X	X	X	X	X	X	X	X	X	X
25 km	X	X	X	X	X	X	X	X	X	X	X	X	X	X			
Number of events	1	1	2	3	3	3	3	3	3	3	3	3	3	3	2	2	3

==== Women's events ====
Edition	1991	1994	1998	2001	2003	2005	2007	2009	2011	2013	2015	2017	2019	2022	2023	2024	2025
3 km knockout sprints																	X
5 km			X	X	X	X	X	X	X	X	X	X	X	X	X	X	X
10 km				X	X	X	X	X	X	X	X	X	X	X	X	X	X
25 km	X	X	X	X	X	X	X	X	X	X	X	X	X	X			
Number of events	1	1	2	3	3	3	3	3	3	3	3	3	3	3	2	2	3

==== Mixed events ====
Edition	1998	2001	2003	2005	2007	2009	2011	2013	2015	2017	2019	2022	2023	2024	2025
5 km team	X						X	X	X	X	X				
6 km team												X	X	X	X
25 km team	X														
Number of events	2	0	0	0	0	0	1	1	1	1	1	1	1	1	1

== Medalists ==
A select number of athletes have won medals at both long course and open water events, including Oussama Mellouli from Tunisia, Hayley Lewis from Australia, Gregorio Paltrinieri from Italy, Florian Wellbrock from Germany, and Sharon van Rouwendaal from the Netherlands. For a full list of medalists covering all editions of the championships see List of World Aquatics Championships medalists in swimming (men) and List of World Aquatics Championships medalists in swimming (women). For a complete list of medal winners in open water swimming see List of World Aquatics Championships medalists in open water swimming.

== All-time medal table ==
Updated after the 2025 World Aquatics Championships.

=== Long course (1973–2025) ===
Rank	Nation	Gold	Silver	Bronze	Total
1	United States	263	216	159	638
2	Australia	109	113	75	297
3	China	64	37	61	162
4	East Germany	50	40	25	115
5	Hungary	36	19	29	84
6	Great Britain	28	24	47	99
7	Italy	27	34	35	96
8	France	26	24	30	80
9	Germany	24	41	40	105
10	Russia	20	36	28	84
11	Sweden	20	20	17	57
12	Canada	18	25	48	91
13	Netherlands	15	30	30	75
14	South Africa	13	9	17	39
15	Japan	11	30	41	82
16	Soviet Union	11	20	21	52
17	Brazil	9	12	10	31
18	West Germany	8	7	11	26
19	Ukraine	8	6	7	21
20	Poland	6	12	12	30
21	Lithuania	6	3	3	12
22	Romania	6	1	7	14
23	Spain	5	7	6	18
24	Tunisia	5	3	3	11
25	Denmark	4	9	8	21
26	South Korea	4	2	3	9
27	Zimbabwe	3	5	0	8
28	Neutral Athletes B (Note: At the 2025 World Championships, in accordance with sanctions imposed following by the 2022 Russian invasion of Ukraine, athletes from Russia were not permitted to use the name, flag, or anthem of Russia. They instead participated as "Neutral Athletes B (NAB)" and under the World Aquatics flag.)	3	4	1	8
29	Finland	3	2	1	6
30	New Zealand	2	6	8	16
31	Belarus	2	1	1	4
32	Portugal	2	1	0	3
32	Serbia	2	1	0	3
34	Ireland	2	0	0	2
35	Hong Kong	1	2	1	4
35	Norway	1	2	1	4
37	Belgium	1	1	3	5
38	Costa Rica	1	1	2	4
39	Greece	1	1	1	3
40	Suriname	1	0	0	1
41	Switzerland	0	8	2	10
42	Austria	0	4	4	8
43	Slovakia	0	3	2	5
44	Croatia	0	2	0	2
45	Bulgaria	0	1	1	2
45	Iceland	0	1	1	2
45	Jamaica	0	1	1	2
45	Yugoslavia	0	1	1	2
49	Czech Republic	0	1	0	1
49	Israel	0	1	0	1
51	Egypt	0	0	3	3
52	Singapore	0	0	2	2
53	Argentina	0	0	1	1
53	Bosnia and Herzegovina	0	0	1	1
53	Kyrgyzstan	0	0	1	1
53	Neutral Athletes A (Note: At the 2025 World Championships, in accordance with sanctions imposed following by the 2022 Russian invasion of Ukraine, athletes from Belarus were not permitted to use the name, flag, or anthem of Russia. They instead participated as "Neutral Athletes A (NAA)" and under the World Aquatics flag.)	0	0	1	1
53	Neutral Independent Athletes (Note: At the 2024 World Championships, in accordance with sanctions imposed following by the 2022 Russian invasion of Ukraine, athletes from Belarus were not permitted to use the name, flag, or anthem of Belarus. They instead participated as "Neutral Independent Athletes (NIA)" and under the World Aquatics flag.)	0	0	1	1
53	Puerto Rico	0	0	1	1
53	Trinidad and Tobago	0	0	1	1
53	Venezuela	0	0	1	1
Totals (60 entries)		821	830	817	2,468

=== Open water (1991–2025) ===
Rank	Nation	Gold	Silver	Bronze	Total
1	Germany	23	17	14	54
2	Italy	12	17	20	49
3	Russia	12	11	9	32
4	United States	10	9	8	27
5	Brazil	8	3	9	20
6	France	7	10	5	22
7	Netherlands	7	7	5	19
8	Australia	6	8	8	22
9	Hungary	2	6	5	13
10	Greece	2	4	3	9
11	Great Britain	2	1	2	5
12	Spain	1	3	1	5
13	Canada	1	1	1	3
14	Bulgaria	1	0	3	4
15	Japan	1	0	1	2
15	South Africa	1	0	1	2
15	Tunisia	1	0	1	2
18	China	1	0	0	1
18	Switzerland	1	0	0	1
20	Belgium	0	1	0	1
20	Czech Republic	0	1	0	1
20	Ecuador	0	1	0	1
23	Argentina	0	0	1	1
23	Egypt	0	0	1	1
23	Monaco	0	0	1	1
23	Portugal	0	0	1	1
23	Ukraine	0	0	1	1
Totals (27 entries)		99	100	101	300

== Multiple medalists ==
Boldface denotes active swimmers and highest medal count among all swimmers (including these who not included in these tables) per type.

=== All events ===
Rank	Swimmer	Country	Gender	From	To	Gold	Silver	Bronze	Total
1	Michael Phelps	United States	M	2001	2011	26 **	6	1	33 **
2	**Katie Ledecky**	United States	F	2013	2025	23	6	1	30
3	Ryan Lochte	United States	M	2005	2015	18 *	5	4 *	27 **
4	**Caeleb Dressel**	United States	M	2017	2022	15	2	–	17
5	**Sarah Sjöström**	Sweden	F	2009	2024	14	8	3	25
6	**Simone Manuel**	United States	F	2013	2025	13 ***	5 *	2	20 ****
7	Lilly King	United States	F	2017	2025	12 **	2	–	14 **
8	**Mollie O'Callaghan**	Australia	F	2022	2025	11	6	–	17
9	Missy Franklin	United States	F	2011	2015	11	2	3	16
9	**Sun Yang**	China	M	2009	2019	11	2	3	16

* including one medal in the relay event in which this swimmer participated in the heats only
** including two medals in the relay events in which this swimmer participated in the heats only
*** including three medals in the relay events in which this swimmer participated in the heats only
**** including four medals in the relay events in which this swimmer participated in the heats only

=== Individual events ===
Rank	Swimmer	Country	Gender	From	To	Gold	Silver	Bronze	Total
1	**Katie Ledecky**	United States	F	2013	2025	**18**	3	1	22
2	Michael Phelps	United States	M	2001	2011	15	5	–	20
3	**Sarah Sjöström**	Sweden	F	2009	2024	14	6	3	**23**
4	**Sun Yang**	China	M	2009	2019	11	2	1	14
5	Ryan Lochte	United States	M	2005	2015	10	3	3	16
6	Katinka Hosszú	Hungary	F	2009	2019	9	1	5	15
7	**Florian Wellbrock**	Germany	M	2019	2025	8	2	2	12
8	**Summer McIntosh**	Canada	F	2022	2025	8	1	2	11
9	**Caeleb Dressel**	United States	M	2017	2022	8	–	–	8
10	Grant Hackett	Australia	M	1998	2007	7	6	1	14

== World records ==
The World Championships have often been the occasion at which elite swimmers reach the peak of their season, and hence numerous world records are often broken.

Edition	Men	Women	Mixed	Total
1973	7	10	Not held	17
1975	1	4	Not held	5
1978	4	10	Not held	14
1982	4	3	Not held	7
1986	–	6	Not held	6
1991	7	–	Not held	7
1994	3	7	Not held	10
1998	–	–	Not held	0
2001	8	–	Not held	8
2003	12	2	Not held	14
2005	5	4	Not held	9
2007	7	8	Not held	15
2009	17	26	Not held	43
2011	2	–	Not held	2
2013	–	6	Not held	6
2015	2	6	3	11
2017	2	6	3	11
2019	5	4	1	10
2022	2	–	1	3
2023	2	7	1	10
2024	1	–	–	1
2025	1	1	1	3

== Championship Records ==
- List of World Championships records in swimming

== See also ==
- Major achievements in swimming by nation
- Swimming at the Summer Olympics
