= Open water swimming at the 1998 World Aquatics Championships =

- Host city: Perth, Australia
- Events: 6

The Open Water Swimming events at the 8th FINA World Aquatics Championships were swum in the ocean off Perth, Western Australia on January 6 and 11, 1998. The discipline featured 4 events: a 5-kilometer race, or "5K", for men and women, and a 25-kilometer race (25K) for men and women. It was the first time the 5K was raced a World Championships. The races featured 80 swimmers from 26 nations.

== Results ==
=== Men ===
| Event | Gold | | Silver | | Bronze | |
|---|---|---|---|---|---|---|
| 5K | Aleksey Akatyev; Russia | 55:18.6 | Ky Hurst; Australia | 55:24.9 | Luca Baldini; Italy | 55:37.4 |
| 25K | Aleksey Akatyev; Russia | 5:05:42.1 | David Meca; Spain | 5:07:22.9 | Gabriel Chaillou; Argentina | 5:07:52.6 |

=== Women ===
| Event | Gold | | Silver | | Bronze | |
|---|---|---|---|---|---|---|
| 5K | Erica Rose; USA | 59:23.5 | Edith van Dijk; Netherlands | 1:00:58.5 | Peggy Büchse; Germany | 1:01:05.8 |
| 25K | Tobie Smith; USA | 5:31:20.1 | Peggy Büchse; Germany | 5:32:19.2 | Edith van Dijk; Netherlands | 5:38.06.9 |

=== Team ===
| Event | Gold | | Silver | | Bronze | |
|---|---|---|---|---|---|---|
| 5K | USA; John Flanagan; Austin Ramirez; Erica Rose | 2:52:12.2 | Russia; Aleksey Akatyev; Evgueni Bezroutchenko; Olga Gouseva | 2:52:16.7 | Italy; Luca Baldini; Fabio Venturini; Valeria Casprini | 2:52:41.6 |
| 25K | Italy; Claudio Gargaro; Fabrizio Pescatori; Valeria Casprini | 16:10:18.2 | Australia; Grant Robinson; Mark Saliba; Tracey Knowles | 16:22:54.3 | USA; Tobie Smith; Nathan Stooke; Chuck Wiley | 16:46:13.3 |

=== Medal standings ===
| Rank | Nation | Gold | Silver | Bronze | Total |
|---|---|---|---|---|---|
| 1 | USA | 3 | 0 | 1 | 4 |
| 2 | RUS | 2 | 1 | 0 | 3 |
| 3 | ITA | 1 | 0 | 2 | 3 |
| 4 | AUS | 0 | 2 | 0 | 2 |
| 5 | GER | 0 | 1 | 1 | 2 |
| 5 | NED | 0 | 1 | 1 | 2 |
| 7 | ESP | 0 | 1 | 0 | 1 |
| 8 | ARG | 0 | 0 | 1 | 1 |
| Totals (8 entries) | | 6 | 6 | 6 | 18 |
