= Australian Swim Team =

National swim team of Australia

The Australian Swim Team, also known as The Dolphins, is the national swim team of Australia for both men and women. The team has a rich history of success at major international championships, with its primary rival being the United States. The nickname 'The Dolphins' was first used in 1989.

The Australian Swim Team has produced numerous world-class swimmers, with thirty-six members inducted into the International Swimming Hall of Fame as of 2015. Notable inductees include Dawn Fraser, Shane Gould, Grant Hackett, Leisel Jones, Kieren Perkins, Murray Rose, and Ian Thorpe. Swimming Australia annually recognizes the Australian Swimmer of the Year.

The Australian Swim Team has finished first in the gold medal rankings once at the Olympic Games in 1956 in Melbourne and twice at the Long Course World Championships in 2001 and 2023, both held in Fukuoka, Japan.

== Olympic Games ==
Year	Gold	Silver	Bronze	Total	Gold Medal Rank
1900	2	0	0	2	2
1904	0	0	0	0	-
1906	0	0	1	1	6
1908	0	1	1	2	5
1912	2	2	2	6	2
1920	0	1	1	2	3
1924	1	1	2	4	3
1928	0	2	0	2	8
1932	1	1	0	2	3
1936	0	0	0	0	-
1948	0	2	2	4	4
1952	1	0	0	1	4
1956	8	4	2	14	1
1960	5	5	3	13	2
1964	4	1	4	9	2
1968	3	2	3	8	2
1972	6	2	2	10	2
1976	0	0	1	1	8
1980	2	0	5	7	4
1984	1	5	6	12	5
1988	1	1	1	3	5
1992	1	3	5	9	6
1996	2	4	6	12	5
2000	5	9	4	18	2
2004	7	5	3	15	2
2008	6	6	8	20	2
2012	1	6	3	10	7
2016	3	4	3	10	2
2020	9	3	9	21	2
2024	7	9	3	19	2

Notes - Open water included from 2008.

== FINA Long Course World Championships ==
=== Pool Results ===
Year	Gold	Silver	Bronze	Total	Gold Medal Rank
1973	1	2	2	5	3
1975	1	2	0	3	6
1978	2	0	2	4	3
1982	0	1	0	1	8
1986	0	0	0	0	-
1991	2	5	1	8	5
1994	4	2	3	9	4
1998	7	6	7	20	2
2001	13	3	3	19	1
2003	6	10	6	22	2
2005	13	5	4	22	2
2007	9	7	5	21	2
2009	3	4	9	16	4
2011	2	8	3	13	4
2013	3	10	0	13	4
2015	7	3	6	16	2
2017	1	5	4	10	8
2019	5	9	5	19	2
2022	6	9	2	17	2
2023	13	7	5	25	1
2024	3	9	4	16	3
2025	8	6	6	20	2

=== Open Water Results ===
Year	Gold	Silver	Bronze	Total	Gold Medal Rank
1998	0	2	0	2	4
2001	0	0	1	1	6
2003	0	0	0	0	-
2005	0	1	0	1	7
2007	0	0	2	2	3
2009	1	1	0	2	2
2011	0	1	0	1	10
2013	0	0	0	0	-
2015	0	0	0	0	-
2017	0	0	0	0	-
2019	0	0	0	0	-
2022	0	0	0	0	-
2023	0	1	1	2	4
2024	1	1	0	2	3
2025	2	0	2	4	2

== FINA Short Course World Championships ==
Year	Gold	Silver	Bronze	Total	Gold Medal Rank
1993	4	9	8	21	3
1995	12	7	7	26	1
1997	9	2	8	19	1
1999	9	11	7	27	1
2000	1	0	3	4	11
2002	10	7	1	18	1
2004	7	15	8	30	2
2006	12	9	4	25	1
2008	8	9	2	19	2
2010	1	7	3	11	9
2012	1	5	3	9	10
2014	1	5	4	10	11
2016	2	2	7	11	9
2018	2	2	8	12	7
2021	0	0	0	0	na
2022	13	8	5	26	2
2024	2	5	5	12	6

== Commonwealth Games ==
Year	Gold	Silver	Bronze	Total	Gold Medal Rank
1930	2	0	0	2	3
1934	3	0	0	3	2
1938	4	2	5	11	2
1950	6	3	2	11	1
1954	6	1	4	11	1
1958	11	6	5	22	1
1962	15	13	8	36	1
1966	11	7	6	24	1
1970	18	10	14	42	1
1974	12	11	10	33	1
1978	10	9	11	30	2
1982	13	13	8	34	1
1986	11	11	11	33	1
1990	21	19	13	53	1
1994	25	17	11	53	1
1998	23	14	11	48	1
2002	26	13	8	47	1
2006	19	18	17	55	1
2010	22	16	16	54	1
2014	19	21	17	57	1
2018	28	21	24	73	1
2022	25	21	19	65	1
2026	37	16	23	76	1

== Pan Pacific Championships ==
Year	Gold	Silver	Bronze	Total	Gold Medal Rank
1985	3	10	11	24	2
1987	4	7	13	24	2
1989	3	6	7	16	2
1991	7	13	9	29	2
1993	8	17	5	30	2
1995	13	12	10	35	2
1997	10	7	4	21	2
1999	13	13	6	32	1
2002	11	14	3	28	2
2006	2	3	12	17	3
2010	6	15	11	32	2
2014	10	9	9	28	2
2018	8	13	8	29	2
2026	15	11	9	35	2

Notes - includes Open water since 2006.

== FINA World Junior Swimming Championships ==
Year	Gold	Silver	Bronze	Total	Gold Medal Rank
2006	-	-	-	-	-
2008	4	4	2	10	4
2011	4	1	3	8	4
2013	10	6	2	18	1
2015	9	7	3	19	1
2017	0	1	4	5	12
2019	4	5	4	13	3
2022	-	-	-	-	-
2023	9	7	8	24	2
2025	1	0	0	1	12

Australia did not send a team to the 2006 nor the 2022 Championships.

== Paralympic Games ==
Year	Gold	Silver	Bronze	Total	Gold Medal Rank
1960	2	0	0	2	9
1964	9	2	2	13	2
1968	5	5	1	11	6
1972	1	3	5	9	10
1976	3	5	2	10	12
1980	1	8	2	11	15
1984	20	30	24	74	9
1988	5	12	14	31	14
1992	10	12	13	25	6
1996	16	16	12	44	3
2000	14	15	21	50	5
2004	6	14	15	35	5
2008	9	11	9	29	7
2012	18	7	12	37	2
2016	9	10	10	29	5
2020	8	10	15	33	6
2024	6	8	13	27	7

== World Para Swimming Championships ==
World Para Swimming Championships, known before 30 November 2016 as the IPC Swimming World Championships.

Year	Gold	Silver	Bronze	Total	Gold Medal Rank
1994	17			42	2
1998	13	16	18	47	3
2002	8	12		29	
2006	6	16	5	27	
2010	13	11	6	30	6
2013	11	4	12	27	7
2015	9	8	13	30	7
2019	2	7	14	23	17
2022	7	15	9	31	7
2023	9	7	14	30	6
2025	9	9	8	26	7

== See also ==
- Swimming Australia
- Australian Paralympic Swim Team
