= Open water swimming at the 2001 World Aquatics Championships – Women's 10 km =

Women's 10 km at the 2001 World Aquatics Championships
- Location: Fukuoka, Japan
- Dates: 18 July

The Women's 10 km Open Water event at the 2001 World Aquatics Championships was held on July 18, 2001 in Fukuoka.

The sun really did shine on the Russian athletes today at Momochihama Beach as they captured one gold and two silver medals in the men's and women's 10K events. The powerful Yevgeny Bezruchenko (RUS) crossed the finish line just ahead of his teammate Vladimir Dyatchin (RUS). Peggy Büchse (GER) who was second in Monday's 5K race, easily outpaced Irina Abysova (RUS) for the women's 10K event. Bezruchenko and Abysova are both coached by three time world champion Aleksey Akatyev.
In the women's event, Büchse added the 10K gold medal to the silver medal she earned on Monday in the women's 5K event. "I am so happy, and I can't believe I actually won. I was not in the leading pack, but I remembered that my coach told me to give it my best effort and to speed it up in the last 1500 meters. I felt that I had a chance to win when I got ahead of van Dijk (NED)." The Netherlands swimmer said "I am very satisfied. I wasn't confident about getting a medal, the group stayed together so long and it was difficult to get out. In the last 900 meters I knew that whatever happened I would get a medal." Van Dijk was the winner of both the 10K and the 25K events at the 2000 World Championships in Honolulu, Hawaii last November.
Silver medalist Abysova had placed 8th in the 10K event in Honolulu last November, just one month after the death of her longtime coach. She joined the training group coached by Akatyev and believed that her best event would be the women's 5K but placed only 10th. It is likely that this swimmer has changed her opinion about the 10K event.
The 10K event has been proposed for inclusion in the 2004 Olympic Games in Athens, Greece. The final events of the FINA Open Water Swimming competition will be held on Saturday when the men's 25K competition starts at 8am and the women's 25K begins at 9am.

== Results ==
Rank	Swimmer	Nationality	Time
1st place, gold medalist(s)	Peggy Büchse	Germany	2:17:32
2nd place, silver medalist(s)	Irina Abysova	Russia	2:17:47
3rd place, bronze medalist(s)	Edith van Dijk	Netherlands	2:17:52
4	Karley Stutzel	Canada	2:18:41
5	Hayley Lewisl	Australia	2:18:47
6	Britta Kamrau	Germany	2:18:50
7	Trudee Hutchinson	Australia	2:18:55
8	Kate Brookes-Peterson	New Zealand	2:18:59
9	Nadezhda Morochkina	Russia	2:19:01
10	Valeria Casprini	Italy	2:19:02
11	Paula Wood	Great Britain	2:19:21
12	Hanna Miluska	Switzerland	2:20:58
13	Etta van der Weijden	Netherlands	2:22:31
14	Erica Rose	USA	2:22:49
15	Denise Schrader	Switzerland	2:24:49
16	Claudia Barsi	Hungary	2:27:05
17	Marieke Theunissen	South Africa	2:27:11
18	Viviane Motti	Brazil	2:28:06
19	Rebecca Linton	New Zealand	2:28:25
20	Elizabeth Lavell	USA	2:43:53
21	Yuki Fukuda	Japan	2:44:52
22	Fabiana Uyvary	Brazil	2:50:52
--	Melissa Pasquali	Italy	DNF
--	Yvetta Hlaváčová	Czech Republic	DQ
--	Rola Harres	Lebanon	DQ

Key: DNF = Did not finish, DQ = Disqualified
