= Open water swimming at the 1998 World Aquatics Championships – Team 5 km =

The Team results of 5 km open water swimming at the 8th FINA World Aquatics Championships are composed of total time from three swimmers per nation from the Men's single and Women's single 5K races where each gender must have at least one swimmer.

== Results ==
Place	Nation	Swimmers	Time	Notes
1	USA	John Flanagan; Austin Ramirez; Erica Rose	2:52:12.2	
2	Russia	Aleksey Akatyev; Yevgeny Bezruchenko; Olga Guseva	2:52:16.7	
3	Italy	Luca Baldini; Fabio Venturini; Valeria Casprini	2:52:41.6	
4	Australia	Ky Hurst; Dave Bates; Bronwen Whitehead	2:52:43.9	
5	Germany	Sebastian Wiese; Christof Wandratsch; Peggy Büchse	2:54:05.3	
6	Slovenia	Igor Majcen; Nace Majcen; Maša Jamnik	2:56:49.5	
7	New Zealand	Carl Gordon; Ryan Coom; Angela Collett	2:57:37.4	
