= Open water swimming at the 1998 World Aquatics Championships – Men's 5 km =

Men's 5 km at the 1998 World Aquatics Championships
- Location: Perth, Australia
- Dates: 6 January

The Men's 5K race at the 8th FINA World Aquatics Championships swam on January 6, 1998, in the ocean off Perth, Western Australia.

== Results ==
Place	Swimmer	Nation	Time	Notes
1	Aleksey Akatyev	Russia	55:18.6	
2	Ky Hurst	Australia	55:24.9	
3	Luca Baldini	Italy	55:37.4	
4	Yevgeny Bezruchenko	Russia	55:41.4	
5	David Meca	Spain	55:42.7	
6	Fabio Venturini	Italy	55:54.7	
7	Igor Majcen	Slovenia	55:55.9	
8	John Flanagan	USA	55:57.3	
9	Carl Gordon	New Zealand	56:06.6	
10	Dave Bates	Australia	56:08.3	
11	Serghei Mariniuc	Moldova	56:09.5	
12	Sebastian Wiese	Germany	56:22.5	
13	Stephane Lecat	France	56:37.0	
13	Christof Wandratsch	Germany	56:37.0	
15	Austin Ramirez	USA	56:51.4	
16	Nace Majcen	Slovenia	57:01.1	
17	Alexandre Angelotti	Brazil	57:25.7	
18	Gareth Fowler	South Africa	58:32.2	
19	Manuel Colmenares	Venezuela	58:33.6	
20	Ryan Coom	New Zealand	58:36.0	
21	Simon Chocron	Venezuela	58:50.8	
22	Alberto Morejón	Cuba	1:02:12.2	
23	Trpimir Kutle	Croatia	1:02:13.3	
24	Takashi Sugisawa	Japan	1:02:15.5	
25	Norbert Csendes	Hungary	1:02:49.5	
26	Anse Henry	Antigua and Barbuda	1:39:49.2	
