= Open water swimming at the 2001 World Aquatics Championships – Men's 10 km =

Men's 10 km at the 2001 World Aquatics Championships
- Location: Fukuoka, Japan
- Dates: 18 July

The men's 10 km open water swimming event at the 2001 World Aquatics Championships was held on July 18, 2001, in Fukuoka.

Today at Momochihama Beach, Russian athletes captured one gold and two silver medals in the men's and women's 10 mkm events. Yevgeny Bezruchenko (RUS) crossed the finish line just ahead of teammate Vladimir Dyatchin (RUS). Peggy Büchse (GER) who was second in Monday's 5 km race, easily outpaced Irina Abysova (RUS) for the women's 10 km event. Bezruchenko and Abysova are both coached by three time world champion Aleksey Akatyev.

Twenty-seven minutes after fireworks signaled the start of the men's 10 km race, a close-knit pack of five lead swimmers were navigating around buoy number three, the farthest distance from the start line, and beginning their return of the first lap of the course. Their course was straight for the Fukuoka Dome and directly into the bright sunlight that glowed off Hakata Bay. There were 29 athletes and almost as many boats. The brisk wind added a wavy chop and another challenge to these swimmers.

The two Australians, a Syrian, a Frenchman and a New Zealander were an unlikely collection of athletes to be leading the race, but it was early with little more than one quarter of the race under their belt. Stéphane Lecat (FRA) and Mark Saliba (AUS) took turns leading the race for the next hour matching each other stroke for stroke and sizing each other up at each breath they took. But the Russians and Italians had been in the middle of the pack throughout, always within striking distance, conserving their energy and planning a strong finish when the time was right.

"My strategy was to say with the crowd the whole time, and move in front at the final point, then lead the race with the best of my ability," said a proud Bezruchenko who had garnered a silver medal in the 5 km race event on Monday.

At the 7500-meter mark, Fabio Venturini (ITA) broke from the pack, trailed by Bezruchenko, Dyatchin and Samuele Pampana (ITA). Several loud whistle blasts from the referee indicated that the swimmers were being scolded for drafting off each other. Additionally Pampana had been warned by the referee to avoid bodily contact with other swimmers and was threatened with disqualification for intentional interference of another swimmer. With less than 300 meters to go, the referee confirmed what Dyatchin already knew, that Pampana had been punching or slapping the smaller Russian with each stroke he took. The referee made the decision to disqualify Pampana but the two Russians and the two Italians were unaware of his decision. All four athletes sprinted to the finish line and each pounded the banner marking the end of the race until the banner fell into the water unable to take further punishment until it was rehung by officials.

Venturini told the media "this is a bittersweet medal, it obviously belonged to Pampana." Italian team officials filed a protest with the referee but the decision was upheld. The Italians then took their protest to the jury of appeals, the FINA Bureau, which upheld the earlier decision. This decision may impact on the team trophy as only one Italian will score points.

The 10-km event has been proposed for inclusion in the 2004 Olympic Games in Athens, Greece. The final events of the FINA Open Water Swimming competition will be held on Saturday when the men's 25 km competition starts at 8am and the women's 25 km begins at 9 am.

== Results ==
Rank	Swimmer	Nationality	Time
1st place, gold medalist(s)	Yevgeny Bezruchenko	Russia	2:01:04
2nd place, silver medalist(s)	Vladimir Dyatchin	Russia	2:01:06
3rd place, bronze medalist(s)	Fabio Venturini	Italy	2:01:11
4	John Flanagan	USA	2:01:16
5	Petar Stoychev	Bulgaria	2:01:22
6	Scott Shepherd	New Zealand	2:01:30
7	Stéphane Lecat	France	2:01:37
8	Mark Saliba	Australia	2:01:37
9	Miodrag Vašić	Yugoslavia	2:01:57
10	Emmanuel Poissier	France	2:01:59
11	Guilherme Bier	Brazil	2:02:57
12	Leigh Bool	Australia	2:04:08
13	Patrick Dideum	USA	2:04:49
14	Carlos Pavao	Brazil	2:05:13
15	Andre Wilde	Germany	2:08:05
16	Carl Gordon	New Zealand	2:08:17
17	Christof Wandratsch	Germany	2:08:23
18	Tim Cowan	Canada	2:09:02
19	Adrian Andermatt	Switzerland	2:10:12
20	Rostislav Vítek	Czech Republic	2:10:16
21	Issei Higashijima	Japan	2:15:22
22	Carlos Scanavino	Uruguay	2:15:48
23	Hisham Masri	Syria	2:20:03
24	Márton Tószegi	Hungary	2:24:20
–	Mohammed Naeem Masri	Syria	DNF
–	Muhammad Sanhori	Sudan	DNF
–	Asaad Hassan	Sudan	DNF
–	David Macuare	Venezuela	DNS

Key: DNF = Did not finish, DQ = Disqualified
