= 1993 FINA World Swimming Championships (25 m) – Men's 200 metre individual medley =

These are the official results of the Men's 200 metres Individual Medley event at the 1993 FINA Short Course World Championships, held in Palma de Mallorca, Spain.

== Finals ==
RANK	FINAL A	TIME
	Christian Keller (GER)	1:56.80
	Fraser Walker (GBR)	1:58.35
	Curtis Myden (CAN)	1:59.27
4.	Petteri Lehtinen (FIN)	1:59.42
5.	Paul Nelsen (USA)	1:59.88
6.	Serguei Mariniuk (MDA)	1:59.92
7.	Frédéric Lefevre (FRA)	2:00.84
8.	Nick Gillingham (GBR)	2:02.14

== Qualifying heats ==
RANK	HEATS RANKING	TIME
1.	Christian Keller (GER)	1:59.77
2.	Fraser Walker (GBR)	2:00.01
3.	Petteri Lehtinen (FIN)	2:00.41
4.	Serguei Mariniuk (MDA)	2:00.76
5.	Paul Nelsen (USA)	2:00.79
6.	Curtis Myden (CAN)	2:01.59
7.	Frédéric Lefevre (FRA)	2:01.70
8.	Nick Gillingham (GBR)	2:02.52

== See also ==
- 1992 Men's Olympic Games 200m Medley
- 1993 Men's European LC Championships 200m Medley
