= Artistic swimming at the 2028 Summer Olympics – Qualification =

This article details the qualifying phase for Artistic swimming at the 2028 Summer Olympics. The competition at these Games comprises a total of 96 artistic swimmers coming from their respective National Olympic Committees (NOCs); each is allowed to enter a maximum of eight members (including two men) if qualified for the open team, and a maximum of two artistic swimmers competing in the women's duet. NOCs could select two of the qualified team members to compete in the women's duet. Host nation United States reserved an eight-member team across all events as America's continental representative.

For the team event, qualification is parted in four priorities. In priority one, the three highest-ranked NOCs in the 2027 World Aquatics Championships will obtain a quota place. In priority two, the host NOC (United States) will obtain a quota place. In priority three, the highest-ranked NOC from each of the five continental meets will obtain a quota place. However, continental quotas will be available for the continents that have not received a quota via priorities one and two. Also, the continent that is not represented in priority one will lose its continental quota. In priority four, the remaining quotas (up to 10) will be allocated in the 2028 World Cup Super Final. For the duet, qualification is parted in three priorities. In priority one, the 10 NOCs qualified for the team event will obtain a duet quota. In priority two, the five highest-ranked NOCs in the 2027 World Aquatics Championships that did not have a qualified team received a quota. In priority three, the three highest-ranked NOCs not yet qualified via a team event and in the 2027 World Aquatics Championships, at the 2028 World Cup Super Final will obtain the last quotas. All ten NOCs eligible to compete in the team event are required to select two members to form a duet.

== Timeline ==
Event	Date	Venue
2027 World Aquatics Championships	10–17 July 2027	(Hungary) Budapest
2027 European Games	22–26 June 2027	(Turkey) Istanbul
African, Asian, Oceanian Continental Selections	TBC	TBC
2028 World Cup Super Final	16–18 June 2028	Canada

== Qualification summary ==
Nation	Team	Duet	Athletes
United States	Yes	Yes	8
Total: 18 NOCs	80	16	96

== Open team ==
Event	Place	Qualified NOC
2027 World Aquatics Championships	3	
Host nation	1	United States
African Continental Selection	1 (Note: Continental quota will be reallocated to the 2028 World Cup Super Final if there is a team qualified from the continent or the continent is not represented at the 2027 World Aquatics Championships)	
Asian Continental Selection	1	
2027 European Games	1	
Oceanian Continental Selection	1	
2028 World Cup Super Final	2	
Total	10	

== Women's duet ==
Event	Place	Qualified NOC
Qualified for the team event	10	United States
2027 World Aquatics Championships	5	
2028 World Cup Super Final	3	
Total	18	
