= Open water swimming at the 1998 World Aquatics Championships – Men's 25 km =

Men's 25 km at the 1998 World Aquatics Championships
- Location: Perth, Australia
- Dates: 11 January

The Men's 25K race at the 8th FINA World Aquatics Championships swam on January 11, 1998, in the ocean off Perth, Western Australia.

== Results ==
Place	Swimmer	Nation	Time	Notes
1	Aleksey Akatyev	Russia	5:05:42.1	
2	David Meca	Spain	5:07:22.9	
3	Gabriel Chaillou	Argentina	5:07:52.6	
4	Claudio Gargaro	Italy	5:09:48.2	
5	Yury Kudinov	Russia	5:12:07.3	
6	Stéphane Lecat	France	5:14:15.5	
7	Grant Robinson	Australia	5:14:40.2	
8	Fabrizio Pescatori	Italy	5:16:54.6	
9	Igor Majcen	Slovenia	5:17:09.1	
10	Nicolas Knap	France	5:22:35.1	
11	Mark Saliba	Australia	5:27:54.1	
12	Andre Wilde	Germany	5:31:38.5	
13	Nathan Stooke	USA	5:32:20.8	
14	Nace Majcen	Slovenia	5:33.52.8	
15	Liam Weseloh	Canada	5:34:53.3	
16	Simon Chocron	Venezuela	5:38:43.3	
17	Chuck Wiley	USA	5:42:32.4	
18	Paulo Torres	Brazil	5:45:04.7	
19	Alberto Morejon	Cuba	5:46:10.8	
20	Ryan Coom	New Zealand	5:48.03.2	
21	Serghei Mariniuc	Moldova	5:52:28.7	
22	Trpimir Kutle	Croatia	5:54:18.1	
23	Robert Dinka	Slovakia	5:57:26.2	
24	Gareth Fowler	South Africa	6:05:11.0	
25	Takashi Sugisawa	Japan	6:12.37.8	
26	Ákos Győrffy	Hungary	6:25:55.4	
--	Manuel Colmenares	Venezuela	DNF	
--	Christof Wandratsch	Germany	DNF	
--	György Pál	Hungary	DNF	
--	Seif Al-Deen El-Hassan	Sudan	DNF	
--	Yasir Abdalmag Osman	Sudan	DNF	
