= Open water swimming at the 1998 World Aquatics Championships – Team 25 km =

The Team results of 25 km open water swimming at the 8th FINA World Aquatics Championships are composed of total time from three swimmers per nation from the Men's single and Women's single 25K races where each gender must have at least one swimmer.

== Results ==
Place	Nation	Swimmers	Time	Notes
1	Italy	Claudio Gargaro; Fabrizio Pescatori; Valeria Casprini	16:10:18.2	
2	Australia	Grant Robinson; Mark Saliba; Tracey Knowles	16:22:54.3	
3	USA	Tobie Smith; Nathan Stooke; Chuck Wiley	16:46:13.3	
4	Germany	Andre Wilde; Britta Kamrau; Peggy Büchse	16:51:21.8	
5	Slovenia	Igor Majcen; Nace Majcen; Maša Jamnik	16:59:33.8	
