= 1993 FINA World Swimming Championships (25 m) – Men's 400 metre individual medley =

These are the official results of the Men's 400 metres Individual Medley event at the 1993 FINA Short Course World Championships held in Palma de Mallorca, Spain.

== Finals ==
RANK	FINAL A	TIME
	Curtis Myden (CAN)	4:10.41
	Serguei Mariniuk (MDA)	4:11.96
	Petteri Lehtinen (FIN)	4:12.33
4.	Paul Nelsen (USA)	4:15.01
5.	Maciej Konecki (POL)	4:18.16
6.	Jorge Pérez (ESP)	4:18.43
7.	Vyascheslav Valdayev (UKR)	4:18.48
8.	Xuong Guoming (CHN)	4:20.85

== Qualifying heats ==
RANK	HEATS RANKING	TIME
1.	Serguei Mariniuk (MDA)	4:12.06
2.	Petteri Lehtinen (FIN)	4:16.75
3.	Curtis Myden (CAN)	4:17.24
4.	Vyascheslav Valdayev (UKR)	4:18.99
5.	Jorge Pérez (ESP)	4:19.35
6.	Paul Nelsen (USA)	4:19.46
7.	Maciej Konecki (POL)	4:19.98
8.	Xuong Guoming (CHN)	4:20.16

== See also ==
- 1992 Men's Olympic Games 400m Medley
- 1993 Men's European LC Championships 400m Medley
