= Swimming at the 2001 World Aquatics Championships – Men's 400 metre individual medley =

Men's 400-metre individual medley at the 2001 FINA World Championships
- Dates: 29 July 2001
- Competitors: 31
- Winning time: 4 minutes 13.15 seconds

Medalists
gold medal	Alessio Boggiatto	Italy
silver medal	Erik Vendt	United States
bronze medal	Thomas Wilkens	United States

The men's 400-metre individual medley event at the 2001 World Aquatic Championships took place 29 July. Both the heats and final were held on 29 July.

== Records ==
Prior to this competition, the existing world and competition records were as follows:

World record	Tom Dolan (USA)	4:11.76	Sydney, Australia	17 September 2000
Championship record	Tom Dolan (USA)	4:12.30	Rome, Italy	6 September 1994

== Results ==
=== Heats ===
Rank	Swimmer	Nation	Time	Notes
1	Thomas Wilkens	United States	4:16.13	Q
2	Alessio Boggiatto	Italy	4:17.86	Q
3	Erik Vendt	United States	4:18.09	Q
4	Jiro Miki	Japan	4:18.48	Q
5	Susumu Tabuchi	Japan	4:18.90	Q
6	Brian Johns	Canada	4:19.25	Q
7	Justin Norris	Australia	4:19.34	Q
8	Curtis Myden	Canada	4:20.88	Q
9	Yves Platel	Switzerland	4:21.11	
10	Dean Kent	New Zealand	4:22.18	
11	Micky Halika	Israel	4:22.66	
12	Grant McGregor	Australia	4:22.67	
13	Jacob Carstensen	Denmark	4:22.74	
14	Vasileios Demetis	Greece	4:24.01	
15	Ioannis Kokkodis	Greece	4:24.55	
16	Marko Milenkovič	Slovenia	4:25.32	
17	Xie Xufeng	China	4:26.32	
18	George Bovell	Trinidad and Tobago	4:30.22	
19	Brenton Cabello	Spain	4:31.58	
20	Javier Díaz	Mexico	4:34.17	
21	Margus Saia	Estonia	4:36.73	
22	Georgi Palazov	Bulgaria	4:36.91	
23	Wu Nien-Pin	Chinese Taipei	4:39.31	
24	Aleksandar Miladinovski	North Macedonia	4:40.87	
25	Benjamin Gan	Singapore	4:41.90	
26	Diego Urreta	Mexico	4:42.26	
27	Wan Azlan	Malaysia	4:43.34	
28	Hsu Kuo-Tung	Chinese Taipei	4:43.49	
29	Seung Gin Lee	Northern Mariana Islands	5:06.64	
30	Dean Palacios	Northern Mariana Islands	5:12.38	
31	Mohammad Nazeri	Iran	5:18.65	
–	George Gleason	United States Virgin Islands	DNS	
–	Nicolas Rostoucher	France	DNS	
–	Örn Arnarson	Iceland	DNS	

=== Final ===
Rank	Name	Nationality	Time	Notes
1st place, gold medalist(s)	Alessio Boggiatto	Italy	4:13.15	
2nd place, silver medalist(s)	Erik Vendt	United States	4:15.36	
3rd place, bronze medalist(s)	Thomas Wilkens	United States	4:15.94	
4	Susumu Tabuchi	Japan	4:18.05	
5	Justin Norris	Australia	4:18.56	
6	Brian Johns	Canada	4:19.75	
7	Curtis Myden	Canada	4:19.80	
8	Jiro Miki	Japan	4:23.11	

Key: WR = World record
