= Swimming at the 2027 World Aquatics Championships =

- Host city: Budapest, Hungary
- Date: 10–18 July
- Venue: MVM Dome
- Events: 42

The swimming events at the 2027 World Aquatics Championships will be held from 10 to 18 July 2027 at the MVM Dome in Budapest, Hungary.

== Schedule ==
42 events will be held.

== Medal summary ==
=== Men ===
Event	Gold	Silver	Bronze
50 metre freestyle			
100 metre freestyle			
200 metre freestyle			
400 metre freestyle			
800 metre freestyle			
1500 metre freestyle			
50 metre backstroke			
100 metre backstroke			
200 metre backstroke			
50 metre breaststroke			
100 metre breaststroke			
200 metre breaststroke			
50 metre butterfly			
100 metre butterfly			
200 metre butterfly			
200 metre individual medley			
400 metre individual medley			
4 × 100 metre freestyle relay			
4 × 200 metre freestyle relay			
4 × 100 metre medley relay			
AF African record | AM Americas record | AS Asian record | CR Championship record | ER European record | OC Oceania record | WR World record | NR National record

=== Women ===
Event	Gold	Silver	Bronze
50 metre freestyle			
100 metre freestyle			
200 metre freestyle			
400 metre freestyle			
800 metre freestyle			
1500 metre freestyle			
50 metre backstroke			
100 metre backstroke			
200 metre backstroke			
50 metre breaststroke			
100 metre breaststroke			
200 metre breaststroke			
50 metre butterfly			
100 metre butterfly			
200 metre butterfly			
200 metre individual medley			
400 metre individual medley			
4 × 100 metre freestyle relay			
4 × 200 metre freestyle relay			
4 × 100 metre medley relay			
AF African record | AM Americas record | AS Asian record | CR Championship record | ER European record | OC Oceania record | WR World record | NR National record

=== Mixed events ===
Event	Gold	Silver	Bronze
4 × 100 metre freestyle relay			
4 × 100 metre medley relay			
AF African record | AM Americas record | AS Asian record | CR Championship record | ER European record | OC Oceania record | WR World record | NR National record
