= Major achievements in swimming by nation =

This is a list of the best results achieved by athletes from different nations at four major competitions where swimming events are (or were) competed. Results are based on major competitions according to FINA's historical records: the swimming and open water swimming events at the Olympic Games, the swimming and open water swimming events at the FINA World Aquatics Championships, the FINA Short Course Swimming World Championships and the defunct FINA World Open Water Swimming Championships. The results listed here only refer to swimming and open water swimming events. Medals earned by athletes from defunct NOCs or historical teams have been merged with the results achieved by their immediate successor states, as follows: Russia inherits medals from the Soviet Union and the Unified Team (but they are not combined in accordance with the IOC rules); Serbia inherits medals from Yugoslavia; Australia inherits medals from Australasia; and Germany inherits medals from West Germany and East Germany (they are not combined). The table is pre-sorted by total number of medals, then most gold medal results, silver medal results and bronze medal results, respectively. When equal ranks are given, countries are listed in alphabetical order.

== Results ==
Last updated after the 2025 World Aquatics Championships
		World Aquatics Championships						Olympic Games					Short Course Worlds			Open Water Worlds		
Rk.	Nation	Long course			Open Water			Long course			Open water		Short course			Open water		
Rk.	Nation	Men	Women	Mixed	Men	Women	Mixed	Men	Women	Mixed	Men	Women	Men	Women	Mixed	Men	Women	Mixed
1	United States	1st place, gold medalist(s)	1st place, gold medalist(s)	1st place, gold medalist(s)	1st place, gold medalist(s)	1st place, gold medalist(s)	1st place, gold medalist(s)	1st place, gold medalist(s)	1st place, gold medalist(s)	1st place, gold medalist(s)		2nd place, silver medalist(s)	1st place, gold medalist(s)	1st place, gold medalist(s)	1st place, gold medalist(s)	1st place, gold medalist(s)	1st place, gold medalist(s)	3rd place, bronze medalist(s)
2	Australia	1st place, gold medalist(s)	1st place, gold medalist(s)	1st place, gold medalist(s)	2nd place, silver medalist(s)	1st place, gold medalist(s)	1st place, gold medalist(s)	1st place, gold medalist(s)	1st place, gold medalist(s)	3rd place, bronze medalist(s)		2nd place, silver medalist(s)	1st place, gold medalist(s)	1st place, gold medalist(s)	2nd place, silver medalist(s)	1st place, gold medalist(s)	3rd place, bronze medalist(s)	2nd place, silver medalist(s)
3	Netherlands	1st place, gold medalist(s)	1st place, gold medalist(s)	2nd place, silver medalist(s)	1st place, gold medalist(s)	1st place, gold medalist(s)	2nd place, silver medalist(s)	1st place, gold medalist(s)	1st place, gold medalist(s)		1st place, gold medalist(s)	1st place, gold medalist(s)	1st place, gold medalist(s)	1st place, gold medalist(s)	1st place, gold medalist(s)	1st place, gold medalist(s)	1st place, gold medalist(s)	
3	Russia	1st place, gold medalist(s)	1st place, gold medalist(s)	1st place, gold medalist(s)	1st place, gold medalist(s)	1st place, gold medalist(s)	2nd place, silver medalist(s)	1st place, gold medalist(s)	1st place, gold medalist(s)			1st place, gold medalist(s)	1st place, gold medalist(s)	1st place, gold medalist(s)	1st place, gold medalist(s)	1st place, gold medalist(s)	1st place, gold medalist(s)	2nd place, silver medalist(s)
5	Italy	1st place, gold medalist(s)	1st place, gold medalist(s)		1st place, gold medalist(s)	1st place, gold medalist(s)	1st place, gold medalist(s)	1st place, gold medalist(s)	1st place, gold medalist(s)		3rd place, bronze medalist(s)	2nd place, silver medalist(s)	1st place, gold medalist(s)	1st place, gold medalist(s)	1st place, gold medalist(s)	1st place, gold medalist(s)	1st place, gold medalist(s)	1st place, gold medalist(s)
6	Great Britain	1st place, gold medalist(s)	1st place, gold medalist(s)	1st place, gold medalist(s)	3rd place, bronze medalist(s)	1st place, gold medalist(s)		1st place, gold medalist(s)	1st place, gold medalist(s)	1st place, gold medalist(s)	2nd place, silver medalist(s)	2nd place, silver medalist(s)	1st place, gold medalist(s)	1st place, gold medalist(s)	2nd place, silver medalist(s)	2nd place, silver medalist(s)	2nd place, silver medalist(s)	
7	Germany	1st place, gold medalist(s)	1st place, gold medalist(s)	3rd place, bronze medalist(s)	1st place, gold medalist(s)	1st place, gold medalist(s)	1st place, gold medalist(s)	1st place, gold medalist(s)	1st place, gold medalist(s)		1st place, gold medalist(s)		1st place, gold medalist(s)	1st place, gold medalist(s)		1st place, gold medalist(s)	1st place, gold medalist(s)	1st place, gold medalist(s)
8	France	1st place, gold medalist(s)	1st place, gold medalist(s)	3rd place, bronze medalist(s)	1st place, gold medalist(s)	1st place, gold medalist(s)	1st place, gold medalist(s)	1st place, gold medalist(s)	1st place, gold medalist(s)				1st place, gold medalist(s)	1st place, gold medalist(s)	1st place, gold medalist(s)		3rd place, bronze medalist(s)	
9	Hungary	1st place, gold medalist(s)	1st place, gold medalist(s)		1st place, gold medalist(s)	2nd place, silver medalist(s)	2nd place, silver medalist(s)	1st place, gold medalist(s)	1st place, gold medalist(s)		1st place, gold medalist(s)	1st place, gold medalist(s)	1st place, gold medalist(s)	1st place, gold medalist(s)				
10	Brazil	1st place, gold medalist(s)	1st place, gold medalist(s)			1st place, gold medalist(s)	2nd place, silver medalist(s)	1st place, gold medalist(s)				1st place, gold medalist(s)	1st place, gold medalist(s)	1st place, gold medalist(s)	1st place, gold medalist(s)		2nd place, silver medalist(s)	
10	Spain	1st place, gold medalist(s)	1st place, gold medalist(s)		1st place, gold medalist(s)	2nd place, silver medalist(s)		1st place, gold medalist(s)	1st place, gold medalist(s)				1st place, gold medalist(s)	1st place, gold medalist(s)		1st place, gold medalist(s)	2nd place, silver medalist(s)	
12	Canada	1st place, gold medalist(s)	1st place, gold medalist(s)	2nd place, silver medalist(s)	1st place, gold medalist(s)			1st place, gold medalist(s)	1st place, gold medalist(s)		3rd place, bronze medalist(s)		1st place, gold medalist(s)	1st place, gold medalist(s)	1st place, gold medalist(s)			
13	China	1st place, gold medalist(s)	1st place, gold medalist(s)	1st place, gold medalist(s)		1st place, gold medalist(s)		1st place, gold medalist(s)	1st place, gold medalist(s)	2nd place, silver medalist(s)			1st place, gold medalist(s)	1st place, gold medalist(s)				
14	Switzerland	2nd place, silver medalist(s)	2nd place, silver medalist(s)			1st place, gold medalist(s)		3rd place, bronze medalist(s)					1st place, gold medalist(s)	3rd place, bronze medalist(s)			3rd place, bronze medalist(s)	3rd place, bronze medalist(s)
15	South Africa	1st place, gold medalist(s)	1st place, gold medalist(s)		1st place, gold medalist(s)			1st place, gold medalist(s)	1st place, gold medalist(s)				1st place, gold medalist(s)	1st place, gold medalist(s)				
16	Ukraine	1st place, gold medalist(s)	1st place, gold medalist(s)		3rd place, bronze medalist(s)			2nd place, silver medalist(s)	1st place, gold medalist(s)				1st place, gold medalist(s)	1st place, gold medalist(s)				
17	Poland	1st place, gold medalist(s)	1st place, gold medalist(s)					2nd place, silver medalist(s)	1st place, gold medalist(s)				1st place, gold medalist(s)	2nd place, silver medalist(s)	3rd place, bronze medalist(s)			
18	Belgium	1st place, gold medalist(s)	2nd place, silver medalist(s)		2nd place, silver medalist(s)			1st place, gold medalist(s)	3rd place, bronze medalist(s)				3rd place, bronze medalist(s)	3rd place, bronze medalist(s)				
19	Argentina	3rd place, bronze medalist(s)			3rd place, bronze medalist(s)			1st place, gold medalist(s)	2nd place, silver medalist(s)				1st place, gold medalist(s)	3rd place, bronze medalist(s)		3rd place, bronze medalist(s)		
20	Japan	1st place, gold medalist(s)	1st place, gold medalist(s)					1st place, gold medalist(s)	1st place, gold medalist(s)				1st place, gold medalist(s)	1st place, gold medalist(s)				
20	Sweden	1st place, gold medalist(s)	1st place, gold medalist(s)					1st place, gold medalist(s)	1st place, gold medalist(s)				1st place, gold medalist(s)	1st place, gold medalist(s)				
22	New Zealand	1st place, gold medalist(s)	1st place, gold medalist(s)					1st place, gold medalist(s)	3rd place, bronze medalist(s)				1st place, gold medalist(s)	1st place, gold medalist(s)				
23	Romania	1st place, gold medalist(s)	1st place, gold medalist(s)					1st place, gold medalist(s)	1st place, gold medalist(s)				2nd place, silver medalist(s)	2nd place, silver medalist(s)				
24	Denmark	3rd place, bronze medalist(s)	1st place, gold medalist(s)					2nd place, silver medalist(s)	1st place, gold medalist(s)				1st place, gold medalist(s)	1st place, gold medalist(s)				
25	Greece	1st place, gold medalist(s)			1st place, gold medalist(s)	2nd place, silver medalist(s)	2nd place, silver medalist(s)	1st place, gold medalist(s)					3rd place, bronze medalist(s)					
26	Austria	2nd place, silver medalist(s)	3rd place, bronze medalist(s)					1st place, gold medalist(s)	3rd place, bronze medalist(s)				1st place, gold medalist(s)	2nd place, silver medalist(s)				
27	Tunisia	1st place, gold medalist(s)			1st place, gold medalist(s)			1st place, gold medalist(s)			1st place, gold medalist(s)		1st place, gold medalist(s)					
28	Lithuania	3rd place, bronze medalist(s)	1st place, gold medalist(s)						1st place, gold medalist(s)				1st place, gold medalist(s)	1st place, gold medalist(s)				
29	Finland	1st place, gold medalist(s)	1st place, gold medalist(s)					2nd place, silver medalist(s)					1st place, gold medalist(s)	2nd place, silver medalist(s)				
30	Ireland	1st place, gold medalist(s)						1st place, gold medalist(s)	1st place, gold medalist(s)				3rd place, bronze medalist(s)	2nd place, silver medalist(s)				
30	Serbia	1st place, gold medalist(s)	1st place, gold medalist(s)					2nd place, silver medalist(s)	1st place, gold medalist(s)				3rd place, bronze medalist(s)					
32	Norway	1st place, gold medalist(s)	2nd place, silver medalist(s)					2nd place, silver medalist(s)	3rd place, bronze medalist(s)				1st place, gold medalist(s)					
33	Czech Republic		2nd place, silver medalist(s)			2nd place, silver medalist(s)							2nd place, silver medalist(s)	2nd place, silver medalist(s)			2nd place, silver medalist(s)	
34	Belarus		1st place, gold medalist(s)					3rd place, bronze medalist(s)					1st place, gold medalist(s)	1st place, gold medalist(s)				
35	Bulgaria		2nd place, silver medalist(s)		1st place, gold medalist(s)				1st place, gold medalist(s)							2nd place, silver medalist(s)		
35	Croatia	2nd place, silver medalist(s)						2nd place, silver medalist(s)					1st place, gold medalist(s)	1st place, gold medalist(s)				
37	Costa Rica		1st place, gold medalist(s)						1st place, gold medalist(s)					1st place, gold medalist(s)				
37	South Korea	1st place, gold medalist(s)						1st place, gold medalist(s)					1st place, gold medalist(s)					
37	Zimbabwe		1st place, gold medalist(s)						1st place, gold medalist(s)					1st place, gold medalist(s)				
40	Hong Kong		1st place, gold medalist(s)						2nd place, silver medalist(s)					1st place, gold medalist(s)				
41	Slovakia		2nd place, silver medalist(s)						2nd place, silver medalist(s)					1st place, gold medalist(s)				
41	Slovenia								2nd place, silver medalist(s)				1st place, gold medalist(s)	2nd place, silver medalist(s)				
43	Israel		2nd place, silver medalist(s)										3rd place, bronze medalist(s)	1st place, gold medalist(s)				
43	Portugal	1st place, gold medalist(s)				3rd place, bronze medalist(s)							2nd place, silver medalist(s)					
45	Venezuela	3rd place, bronze medalist(s)						3rd place, bronze medalist(s)					1st place, gold medalist(s)					
46	Trinidad and Tobago	3rd place, bronze medalist(s)						3rd place, bronze medalist(s)					2nd place, silver medalist(s)					
47	Kazakhstan							1st place, gold medalist(s)					1st place, gold medalist(s)					
47	Suriname	1st place, gold medalist(s)						1st place, gold medalist(s)										
49	Cuba							2nd place, silver medalist(s)					1st place, gold medalist(s)					
49	Jamaica		2nd place, silver medalist(s)											1st place, gold medalist(s)				
51	Mexico							1st place, gold medalist(s)	3rd place, bronze medalist(s)									
51	Singapore	3rd place, bronze medalist(s)						1st place, gold medalist(s)										
53	Bosnia and Herzegovina		3rd place, bronze medalist(s)											3rd place, bronze medalist(s)				
53	Egypt		3rd place, bronze medalist(s)		3rd place, bronze medalist(s)													
53	Puerto Rico	3rd place, bronze medalist(s)											3rd place, bronze medalist(s)					
56	Cayman Islands												1st place, gold medalist(s)					
57	Algeria												2nd place, silver medalist(s)					
57	Ecuador					2nd place, silver medalist(s)												
57	Iceland	2nd place, silver medalist(s)																
57	Moldova												2nd place, silver medalist(s)					
61	Bahamas													3rd place, bronze medalist(s)				
61	Estonia													3rd place, bronze medalist(s)				
61	Faroe Islands												3rd place, bronze medalist(s)					
61	Kyrgyzstan	3rd place, bronze medalist(s)																
61	Philippines							3rd place, bronze medalist(s)										
61	Turkey												3rd place, bronze medalist(s)					

== See also ==
- List of major achievements in sports by nation
