= Open water swimming at the 2027 World Aquatics Championships =

- Host city: Budapest, Hungary
- Date: 3–8 July
- Events: 7

The Open water swimming events at the 2027 World Aquatics Championships will be held from 3 to 8 July 2027 in Budapest, Hungary.

== Schedule ==
Seven events will be held.

== Medal summary ==
=== Men ===
Event	Gold	Silver	Bronze
3 km knockout sprints			
5 km			
10 km			

=== Women ===
Event	Gold	Silver	Bronze
3 km knockout sprints			
5 km			
10 km			

=== Team ===
Event	Gold	Silver	Bronze
Team			
