= Petteri Lehtinen =

Finnish swimmer (born 1973)

Personal information
- Full name: Jyri Petteri Lehtinen
- Nationality: Finland
- Born: December 11, 1973 (age 52) Espoo, Finland
- Height: 1.75 m (5 ft 9 in)
- Weight: 74 kg (163 lb)

Sport
- Sport: Swimming
- Strokes: Medley
- Club: Lahden Kaleva
Medal record
Men's swimming
World Championships (SC)
Bronze medal – third place	1993 Palma	400 m individual medley

Petteri Lehtinen (born December 11, 1973, in Espoo, Finland) is a retired medley swimmer from Finland. Lehtinen competed for his native country at two consecutive Summer Olympics, starting in 1992 in Barcelona, Spain. His best result was a 12th place in the men's 400 m individual medley at the 1992 Summer Olympics in Barcelona.
