= High diving at the 2027 World Aquatics Championships =

- Host city: Budapest, Hungary
- Date: 8–11 July
- Events: 2

The high diving events at the 2027 World Aquatics Championships will be held from 8 to 11 July 2027 in Budapest, Hungary.

== Schedule ==
Two events will be held.

== Medal summary ==
=== Medal events ===
Event	Gold	Silver	Bronze
Men			
Women			
