= Water polo at the 2027 World Aquatics Championships =

- Host city: Budapest, Hungary
- Date: 26 June – 9 July
- Venue: MVM Dome
- Events: 2

The water polo events at the 2027 World Aquatics Championships will be held from 26 June to 9 July 2027 at the MVM Dome in Budapest, Hungary.

== Qualification ==
A total of 16 teams qualify for each tournament.

=== Men ===
Event	Dates	Hosts	Quota	Qualifier(s)
Host nation	—N/a	—N/a	1	Hungary
2026 World Cup	7 April – 26 July 2026	(Australia) Sydney	3	Australia; Greece; Italy
2026 European Championship	10–25 January 2026	(Serbia) Belgrade	3	Croatia; Serbia; Spain
2026 Asian Games	20 September – 3 October 2026	(Japan) Nagoya	2	Japan; Kazakhstan
2027 Pan American Championship	2027	(Colombia) Barranquilla	2	
2027 African Championship	2027		1	
Oceanian selection	—N/a	—N/a	1	
World ranking	—N/a	—N/a	3	
Total			16	

=== Women ===
Event	Dates	Hosts	Quota	Qualifier(s)
Host nation	—N/a	—N/a	1	Hungary
2026 World Cup	21 April – 26 July 2026	(Australia) Sydney	3	Australia; Spain; United States
2026 European Championship	26 January – 5 February 2026	(Portugal) Funchal	3	Greece; Italy; Netherlands
2026 Asian Games	20 September – 3 October 2026	(Japan) Nagoya	2	China; Japan
2027 Pan American Championship	2027	(Colombia) Barranquilla	2	
2027 African Championship	2027		1	
Oceanian selection	—N/a	—N/a	1	
World ranking	—N/a	—N/a	3	
Total			16	

== Medalists ==
=== Medal summary ===
Event	Gold	Silver	Bronze
Men			
Women			
