= Diving at the 2027 World Aquatics Championships =

- Host city: Budapest, Hungary
- Date: 26 June – 4 July
- Venue: Duna Arena
- Events: 13

Diving at the 2027 World Aquatics Championships will be held from 26 June to 4 July 2027 at the Duna Arena in Budapest, Hungary.

== Schedule ==
13 events will be held.

== Medal summary ==
=== Men ===
Event	Gold	Silver	Bronze
1 metre springboard			
3 metre springboard			
10 metre platform			
Synchronized; 3 metre springboard			
Synchronized; 10 metre platform			

=== Women ===
Event	Gold	Silver	Bronze
1 metre springboard			
3 metre springboard			
10 metre platform			
Synchronized; 3 metre springboard			
Synchronized; 10 metre platform			

=== Mixed ===
Event	Gold	Silver	Bronze
3 metre springboard			
10 metre platform			
Team			
