= Serghei Mariniuc =

Moldovan swimmer (born 1969)

Personal information
- Full name: Serghei Mariniuc
- National team: Moldova
- Born: 14 February 1969 (age 57) Chişinău, Moldavian SSR, Soviet Union
- Height: 1.73 m (5 ft 8 in)
- Weight: 64 kg (141 lb)

Sport
- Sport: Swimming
- Strokes: Freestyle, medley
- Club: Moldova Swim Team; Santa Clara Swim Club (U.S.)
- Coach: Luba Pohilenco
Medal record
Men's swimming
Representing Moldova
World Championships (SC)
Silver medal – second place	1993 Palma	400 m medley
Representing Soviet Union
Summer Universiade
Silver medal – second place	1987 Zagreb	400 m medley

Serghei Mariniuc (born February 14, 1969) is a Moldovan former swimmer, who specialized in individual medley events. He represented the Unified Team and the Republic of Moldova in all three editions of the Olympic Games since 1992, and later became a top eight finalist in two individual medleys throughout his Olympic career, emerging him as the nation's most prominent swimmer. He also captured a silver medal in the 400 m individual medley at the 1993 FINA Short Course World Championships in Palma de Mallorca, Spain. When he moved to the United States in 1993, Mariniuc trained professionally for the Santa Clara Swim Club in California until he announced his official retirement in late 2000.

== Career ==
=== Early years ===
Mariniuc, a native of Chişinău, Moldavian SSR, started his sporting career at the age of eight under a strict Soviet swimming system. He shortly became a member of the Moldova Swim Club under his coach Luba Pohilenco, and then officially played for the Soviet Union's senior national team before its complete extinction in 1991.

Following the breakup of the Soviet Union, Mariniuc emerged as Moldova's swimming sensation at every level of the competition. He made his official debut for the Unified Team, also known as the Commonwealth of Independent States, at the 1992 Summer Olympics in Barcelona. While he did not win a single medal, Mariniuc successfully made the final, and finished seventh in the 400 m individual medley (4:22.93). He also posted a tenth-place time of 2:03.72 in the 200 m individual medley, trailing Spain's overwhelming favorite Martin López-Zubero, the winner of the B-final, by 0.38 seconds.

Returning home from the Games, Mariniuc viewed his nation as "forsaken" and "hopeless", discovering that some of the swimming pools did not have a water; others were filled with chemicals or locked. Giving up his sport to support the nation's financial scarcity, Mariniuc worked as a part-time taxi driver riding around Chişinău's urban suburbs to earn sufficient rubles, Moldova's main currency, for a living.

=== Journey to United States ===
In 1993, Mariniuc left his homeland Moldova with a thousand-dollar air fare for Santa Clara, California, where he trained and worked as an assistant club coach for the Santa Clara Swim Club. Recovering from a physical condition back in his homeland, Mariniuc pulled away from the rest of the field to claim the 800-yard freestyle title (8:19.29) at the Swim Meet of Champions in Mission Viejo, California.

On that same year, Mariniuc added another coveted title in the pool to his collection at the U.S. Nationals in Austin, Texas, and later earned a silver medal for his native Moldova in the 400 m individual medley (4:11.96) at the 1993 FINA Short Course World Championships in Palma de Mallorca, Spain, finishing behind Canada's Curtis Myden by 1.56 seconds.

=== International career ===
Three years since he moved to the United States, Mariniuc reached his worldwide breakthrough at the 1996 Summer Olympics in Atlanta, representing the Republic of Moldova. Nearly a month before the Games, he earned three pool titles each in the 200 m IM (2:05.03), 400 m IM (4:23.74), and 800 m freestyle (8:10.60) at the Santa Clara International Meet, representing his host swim club.

At the 1996 Summer Olympics, Mariniuc failed again to collect a single medal in any of his events, finishing eighth in the 400 m individual medley (4:21.15), and twelfth in the 200 m individual medley (2:04.11).

Two years later, at the 1998 FINA World Championships in Perth, Australia, Mariniuc pulled off a twelfth-place effort in the 200 m individual medley with a sterling time of 2:04.58. Adding open water swimming to his program, he also placed eleventh in the 5 km (59:06.5), and twenty-first in the 25 km (5:52:28.7).

Mariniuc swam only in the men's 400 m individual medley, as a 31-year-old, at the 2000 Summer Olympics in Sydney. He achieved a FINA B-standard of 4:24.17 from the U.S. National Championships in Federal Way, Washington. He challenged seven other swimmers in heat three, including Russia's 19-year-old Alexey Kovrigin and Colombia's three-time Olympian Alejandro Bermúdez. Entering the race with a top-seeded time, Mariniuc enjoyed a powerful lead in the halfway mark, but fell short on the freestyle leg to register a third-place time and a lifetime best of 4:23.57, a 1.36-second deficit from winner Kovrigin. Unlike his previous Olympics, Mariniuc failed to reach the top 8 final, as he placed twenty-second overall in the morning prelims. Shortly after the Games, Mariniuc announced his official retirement from the sport.

== Life after swimming ==
Since he came to the United States in 1993, Mariniuc became an expert in network and systems administration, database management, website development, and security. In 1999, Mariniuc was appointed to be the pioneer and IT director of an e-learning authoring tools company, where he programmed numerous features to implement a customer support process. Mariniuc is currently the vice-president of a technology services company based in Sunnyvale, California, where among other support projects, he assist teams to generate and manage timing systems applied in national and worldwide swimming competitions.

Mariniuc currently resides in Santa Clara, California, along with his wife and former swimmer Eve Walton, and two children.

== See also ==
- List of Moldovan records in swimming
- List of World Swimming Championships (25 m) medalists (men)
