= Susumu Tabuchi =

Japanese swimmer

Personal information
- Born: July 2, 1980 (age 46)

Sport
- Sport: Swimming
- Strokes: Medley

Susumu Tabuchi (田渕 晋, Tabuchi Susumu; born 2 July 1980) is a Japanese former swimmer who competed in the 2000 Summer Olympics and in the 2004 Summer Olympics.
