= Patrick Dideum =

American swimmer (born 1981)

Personal information
- Full name: Patrick James Dideum
- Nickname: D iddy
- Nationality: United States
- Born: September 16, 1981 (age 44) Albuquerque

Sport
- Sport: Swimming
- Strokes: Freestyle
- Club: Aggie Athletics (Retired)
- College team: Texas A&M University

Patrick Dideum (born September 16, 1981 in Albuquerque) is a male freestyle swimmer from United States. He represented his native country at the 2001 World Aquatics Championships in Fukuoka, Japan, competing in one individual event (10 km) placing 13th. In 2003, he represented the US again in the 2003 World Aquatics Championships in Barcelona, Spain this time competing in two individual events, 5 km and 10 km finishing 19th and 16th respectively and was the top American finisher in the 10 km. He retired from swimming in 2005 after competing in the USA Open Water National Championships in Ft Myers, FL where he finished 12th in the 10 km.

Patrick held the World Record for the 2.4 mile swim at Horsetooth Reservoir just west of Fort Collins, CO from 2004 to 2011.

In 2006, Patrick competed in the 2006 Lausanne ITU Aquathlon World Championships in Lausanne, Switzerland placing 12th.

In September 2010, Patrick was elected to the Board of Directors for USA Swimming where he served a two-year term.

Patrick attended medical school in San Antonio, TX where he was the president of his medical school class. After graduation, he started a 3 year residency in Pediatrics at San Antonio Uniformed Services Health Education Consortium. He is a Major in the United States Air Force.
