= Open water swimming at the 1998 World Aquatics Championships – Women's 5 km =

Women's 5 km at the 1998 World Aquatics Championships
- Location: Perth, Australia
- Dates: 6 January

The Women's 5K race at the 8th FINA World Aquatics Championships swam on January 6, 1998, in the ocean off Perth, Western Australia.

== Results ==
Place	Swimmer	Nation	Time	Notes
1	Erica Rose	USA	59:23.5	
2	Edith van Dijk	Netherlands	1:00:58.5	
3	Peggy Büchse	Germany	1:01:05.8	
4	Megan Ryther	USA	1:01:09.2	
5	Valeria Casprini	Italy	1:01:09.5	
6	Bronwen Whitehead	Australia	1:01:10.7	
7	Angela Maurer	Germany	1:01.11.1	
8	Melissa Pasquali	Italy	1:01:11.6	
9	Annette Andermatt	Switzerland	1:01:13.2	
10	Anne Chagnaud	France	1:01:14.7	
11	Olga Guseva	Russia	1:01:16.7	
12	Kristy Park	Australia	1:01:28.3	
13	Ravee Intpornudom	Thailand	1:01:30.2	
14	Etta van der Weijden	Netherlands	1:02:42.6	
15	Angela Collett	New Zealand	1:02:54.8	
16	Maša Jamnik	Slovenia	1:03:52.5	
17	Paula Wood	Great Britain	1:03:56.0	
18	Robyn Bradley	South Africa	1:03:56.3	
19	Attilia Figini	Switzerland	1:06:38.9	
20	Edit Kasparik	Hungary	1:06:42.0	
21	Rania Ghousheh	Jordan	1:26:38.4	
22	Andrea Edwards	Antigua and Barbuda	1:30:25.1	
