= 2027 World Aquatics Championships =

Sporting event in Budapest, Hungary

- Host city: Budapest, Hungary
- Date: 26 June – 18 July
- Venue: 3
- Events: TBD in 6 sports

The 2027 World Aquatics Championships will be the 23rd edition of the World Aquatics Championships, held in Budapest, Hungary from 26 June to 18 July 2027.

== Host selection ==
On 21 July 2019, World Aquatics (then FINA) selected Budapest, Hungary for the 2027 edition.

== Venues ==
Most of the competitions will be held at the MVM Dome and Duna Arena.

- Duna Arena (Artistic Swimming, Diving)
- MVM Dome (Swimming, Water Polo)
- TBC (High Diving, Open Water Swimming)

== Schedule ==
The competition schedule was announced on 29 January 2026.

- Artistic swimming: 10–17 July
- Diving: 26 June – 4 July
- High diving: 8–11 July
- Open water swimming: 3–8 July
- Swimming: 10–18 July
- Water polo: 26 June – 9 July
