= Austin Ramirez =

American swimmer (born 1978)

Agustin Ramirez
Personal information
- Full name: Agustin Ramirez
- Nationality: United States
- Born: June 30, 1978 (age 48) Brookfield, Wisconsin

Sport
- Sport: Swimming
- Strokes: Freestyle
- Club: Elmbrook
Medal record
Men's swimming
Representing the United States
World Championships (LC)
Gold medal – first place	1998 Perth	Team 5 km
Pan American Games
Silver medal – second place	1999 Winnipeg	400m freestyle

Austin Ramirez (born June 30, 1978) is the president and CEO of HUSCO International. He replaced his father, Agustin Ramirez, who was CEO for 25 years.

Ramirez graduated from the University of Virginia with a degree in Systems engineering and spent two years working as a consultant at the San Francisco office of McKinsey and Company, a global management consulting firm.

Ramirez worked for a year as a project manager at Husco, then went to graduate school at Stanford Graduate School of Business in Palo Alto, California as a Goldman Sachs Fellow and graduated as an Arjay Miller Scholar.

Ramirez became CEO of Husco's automotive business in 2008.

Previously Ramirez was a freestyle swimmer from United States. He represented his native country at the 1998 World Aquatics Championships in Perth, Western Australia, competing in two individual events (5 km).

Ramirez sits on a number of education-focused boards including: Teach for America, Boys and Girls Clubs, YMCA, and United Performing Arts Fund. He is also director of the Greater Milwaukee Committee, Metropolitan Milwaukee Chamber of Commerce and Young Presidents' Organization.
