= Open water swimming at the 2001 World Aquatics Championships – Women's 5 km =

Women's 5 km at the 2001 World Aquatics Championships
- Location: Fukuoka, Japan
- Dates: 16 July

The Women's 5 km Open Water event at the 2001 World Aquatics Championships was held on July 16, 2001 in Fukuoka.

== Results ==
Rank	Swimmer	Nationality	Time
1st place, gold medalist(s)	Viola Valli	Italy	1:00:23
2nd place, silver medalist(s)	Peggy Büchse	Germany	1:00:49
3rd place, bronze medalist(s)	Hayley Lewis	Australia	1:00:52
4	Angela Maurer	Germany	1:00:54
5	Valeria Casprini	Italy	1:01:06
6	Edith van Dijk	Netherlands	1:01:08
7	Erica Rose	USA	1:01:11
8	Olga Guseva	Russia	1:01:57
9	Hanna Miluska	Switzerland	1:02:05
10	Audrey Boitte	France	1:02:06
11	Paula Wood	Great Britain	1:02:07
12	Irina Abysova	Russia	1:02:08
13	Trudee Hutchinson	Australia	1:02:09
14	Briley Bergen	USA	1:02:09
15	Kate Brookes-Peterson	New Zealand	1:02:10
16	Denise Schrader	Switzerland	1:02:10
17	Rebecca Linton	New Zealand	1:02.11
18	Etta van der Weijden	Netherlands	1:02.11
19	Karley Stutzel	Canada	1:02.12
20	Viviane Motti	Brazil	1:03:44
21	Marieke Theunissen	South Africa	1:03:44
22	Noako Nojiri	Japan	1:06:15
23	Claudia Barsi	Hungary	1:07:44
24	Katarína Kuníková	Slovakia	1:08:58
25	Fabiana Oliveira	Brazil	1:12:33
26	Rola Harres	Lebanon	1:19:50
--	Yvetta Hlaváčová	Czech Republic	DQ
--	Karolína Benoczová	Slovakia	DQ

Key: DQ = Disqualified
