= Nathan Stooke =

American swimmer (born 1976)

Personal information
- Full name: Nathan Stooke
- Nationality: United States
- Born: May 28, 1976 (age 50)
- Education: O'Fallon High School, Southern Illinois University of Carbondale
- Occupation: Chief Executive Officer

Sport
- Sport: Swimming
- Strokes: Freestyle
- Club: St. Louis Masters
- College team: Southern Illinois University of Carbondale
- Coach: Rick Walker, Southern Illinois
Medal record
Men's swimming
Representing the United States
World Championships (LC)
Bronze medal – third place	1998 Perth	Team 25 km
1997 Pan Pacific Swimming Championships
Bronze medal – third place	1997 Pan Pacific, Fukuoka	25 km

Nathan Stooke (born May 28, 1976, in Southern Illinois) is a male freestyle swimmer from the United States who was part of a World Aquatic team championship bronze medal for America in the 25 km Open Water Swim in Perth, Australia in 1998. In August 1997, after winning an individual bronze medal at the Pan Pacific Championships in Japan, he was rated third best in the world in the 25 km (15.5 mile) Open Water event. In 2003, he founded Wisper Internet, an Illinois-based wireless high speed provider of internet service to rural areas, and has served as their CEO.

== Early swim career ==
Born on May 28, 1976, Nathan was the son of Nick and Michaele Stooke.

Swim lessons for Nathan began as early as three and four years of age, but he did not begin competitive swimming until the summer of 1991, swimming for Montgomery, Alabama's local YMCA Barracuda's team. With the Barracudas, he was coached by Chris Snyder, though he swam well at a much earlier age. Showing early skills, he set his eye on the Atlantic Olympics, and confined his sports endeavors to competitive swimming. His father was in the Air Force, so the family moved frequently in Nathan's early years. Stooke began weight training early in his swim career, and attended daily practices, and monthly competitive meets. Stooke, showing considerable discipline, maintained an "A" average, despite having to study twice as long due to his dyslexia. He swam year-round, and advised beginning swimmers to avoid missing practice, and to be flexible when advised to adapt or change their stroke.

Coached by Chris Snyder, while Nathan was swimming with the Montgomery YMCA Barracuda Team in Prattville, Alabama, the team took a first-place finish in the State Championship meet in July 1991, having placed first the year before. Nathan, though not yet breaking records, took a third place in the 100 meter butterfly for the 15-18-year-old boys division, demonstrating the ability to perform a difficult stroke requiring practice, attention to technique, and strength.

On October 12, 1991, competing at age 15 for the Montgomery YMCA team, at the Great Pumpkin meet in Birmingham, Alabama, Nathan placed first in the 100 backstroke in the C-division, first in the 100 butterfly, and second in the 200 IM for the B-division. Nathan had a solid foundation in swimming fundamentals, and performed well in a number of diverse strokes in his youth, demonstrating attention to technique and consistent practice time.

Showing early swimming strengths, the following year he competed just before his sixteenth birthday, at the Greater Pensacola Aquatic Club Long Course Invitational on May 24, 1992, where he placed third in the 50 free, third in the 200 free with a 2:15:21, and first in his strength, the 800 free with a 9:57:62. Nathan already had an interest in distance events. Showing versatility, he also placed in the 100 and 200 Back as well as the 200 IM. His times were not exceptional for an adult competitive swimmer, but for his age they showed considerable promise.

=== Seahawk Swim Team ===
By 1993 at 16, Nathan was competing for the Seahawk Swim Team of Belleville, Illinois, coached by Karen Kaiser. Coach Kaiser noted that the team's practices were often more challenging than those of a college swimmer. Stooke attended O'Fallon High School, graduating in 1994. He often woke up at 4:30 to begin swimming at 5:30, completing the program's demanding two hour practices and swimming as much as eleven months a year. Unlike most of the team, as one of the older and fastest swimmers, as a high school swimmer he would put in a practice both before and after school, completing as much as 8000 yards in a day, a challenging workout for a college-age competitor.

== High School ==
He would attend and graduate O'Fallon High School in 1994, where he was a member of the band, National Honor Society, math team, a Junior Achievement Business teacher, a Student Council representative, and was a member of the Illinois High School All-State Swim Team. He was a recipient of the Belleville News-Democrat's Academic Excellence Awards for graduating Seniors.

== Southern Illinois University ==
Attending between 1994 and 1998, Stooke would swim and compete for Southern Illinois University of Carbondale, majoring in Computer Science. A gifted mentor to Nathan, Rick Walker, Southern Illinois's head coach has won nine conference championships, and notably was head coach and director for twelve years for the USA Swimming Open Water National Team. Walker began head coaching the men's team at SIU in 1992, not long before Nathan attended, but had worked as an assistant coach for several years earlier. Walker also chaired the USA Swimming Open Water Committee. Competing in college at Texas A&M, Walker set records for distance events, particularly the 500, 1000, and 1650 free.

At a college meet for Southern Illinois in November 1996, Stooke took third in the 100 backstroke, and showing a proclivity for distance swimming, took third in the 500 Freestyle with a competitive time of 4:50.82. For 1995, around his Sophomore year, Stooke achieved academic honors for maintaining a 4.0 grade point average at Southern Illinois as part of an All-academic first team for college swimmers.

== 1997 Pan Pacific 25 Km bronze ==
As a college Senior, swimming as part of the U.S. National Team, on August 10, 1997, at the Pan Pacific Swimming Championships held in the Sea of Japan in Fukuoka, Japan, Nathan took third, winning a bronze medal in the 25 km Open Water Competition. He had a great time of 4:57:37.92. A considerable accomplishment, Stooke became the first American since 1991 to complete the distance in under five hours. The bronze medal set his place at the time as the third fastest 25 km swimmer in the world. Stooke had to contend with salt water in his eyes and stings from jelly fish on his face and nose. The demanding race took place on a 5 km course shaped like a triangle off Oburu Bay, which required multiple laps to complete the course. The race was particularly demanding with choppy, 30-degree water, and strong currents. The race leader, Australian Grant Robinson, dominated the second and third-place finishers with a twelve-minute lead. The weather was largely the result of the late effects of Typhoon Tina. Though the Australians performed well in several distance events, the American team took the most medals in the meet.

== 1998 World Aquatics Championship, team bronze ==
On January 11, 1998, he represented America at the 1998 World Aquatics Championships in Perth, Western Australia, taking 13th place in the individual (25 km) with a time of 5:32:21, and taking a bronze in the team competitions with the American team. As previously noted, Nathan swam as part of the mixed 25 km (15.5 Miles) Open water competition. The four member American team of Chuck Wiley, Tobey Smith, Karen Burton, and Nathan (one swimmer may have been a back-up) took a bronze, having a combined time of 16:46:13.30, which placed them 35:55 minutes behind the winning Italian team.

On April 18, 1998, his University, Southern Illinois took first place team honors at the 25 km Open Water Event at the US National Championships at Melbourne, Florida.

In early June 1999, Stooke took fifth place at the USA 25 km Open Water Swim in Honolulu, Hawaii, with a good time of 4:42:57, qualifying him to swim in the USA Open Water National Championships in Honolulu in November 1999.

In August 2015, he took sixth place in the 35-39 age groups in the 3 km Open Water Swim at the 16th FINA World Masters Championships in Russia's Kazan River.

=== Supporting swimming ===
In 2023 he served as an assistant coach and president of the Belleville, Illinois Seahawks Swim Club. He has competed in local triathlon and placed well.

== Wisper Internet founder and CEO ==
He has served as the chief executive officer of Wisper Internet, a residential internet provider which also services businesses, which he founded around 2003, initially funded to a large extent with his own credit cards. Wisper initially headquartered in Shiloh, and then Mascoutah, Illinois but much of its work is in Missouri with six offices in the state. The Internet provider received sizable FCC subsidies in 2018 to help assist in their growth and their ability to service more customers. Stooke is particularly skilled in wireless communications and internet. He remains an advocate for dyslexia, and competed as a professional swimmer. Wisper had rapid early growth, and was initially based in Shiloh, Missouri, 150 miles West of St. Louis. The company aims to provide high speed internet connectivity to homes and businesses in rural areas. To extend service to rural areas, the company builds their own towers, or leases space on the antennas of existing internet providers. A progressive CEO in tune with his workers, by 2011 Stooke had arranged for many of his employees, who complained of personal and student loan debt, to take courses in managing their personal finances as part of their company training. Completion of the training could earn employees a bonus or raise if the company reached set financial growth goals. A small, but successful company, Wisper as of September 2023 had 48 employees, but had over 100 in 2021.
