= Artistic swimming at the 2027 World Aquatics Championships =

- Host city: Budapest, Hungary
- Date: 10–17 July
- Venue: Duna Arena
- Events: 11

The artistic swimming events at the 2027 World Aquatics Championships will be held from 10 to 17 July 2027 at the Duna Arena in Budapest, Hungary.

== Schedule ==
11 events will be held.

== Medal summary ==
=== Men ===
Event	Gold	Silver	Bronze
Solo free routine			
Solo technical routine			

=== Women ===
Event	Gold	Silver	Bronze
Solo free routine			
Solo technical routine			
Duet free routine			
Duet technical routine			

=== Mixed ===
Event	Gold	Silver	Bronze
Duet free routine			
Duet technical routine			

=== Team ===
Event	Gold	Silver	Bronze
Acrobatic routine			
Free routine			
Technical routine			
