= Chuck Wiley (swimmer) =

American swimmer (born 1964)

Personal information
- Full name: Chuck Wiley
- Nationality: United States
- Born: September 12, 1964 (age 62) Arizona

Sport
- Sport: Swimming
- Strokes: Freestyle
- Club: Texas Aquatics
Medal record
Men's swimming
Representing the United States
World Championships (LC)
Bronze medal – third place	1998 Perth	Team 25 km

Chuck Wiley (born September 12, 1964, in Arizona) is a male freestyle swimmer from the United States. He represented his native country at the 1998 World Aquatics Championships in Perth, Western Australia, competing in one individual event (25 km).
