= Open water swimming at the 2001 World Aquatics Championships – Men's 5 km =

Men's 5 km at the 2001 World Aquatics Championships
- Location: Fukuoka, Japan
- Dates: 16 July

The Men's 5 km Open Water event at the 2001 World Aquatics Championships was held on July 16, 2001 in Fukuoka.

== Results ==
Rank	Swimmer	Nationality	Time
1st place, gold medalist(s)	Luca Baldini	Italy	55:37
2nd place, silver medalist(s)	Yevgeny Bezruchenko	Russia	56:31
3rd place, bronze medalist(s)	Marco Formentini	Italy	56:42
4	Mark Leonard	USA	56:43
5	Scott Shepherd	New Zealand	56:44
6	Anton Sanachev	Russia	56:54
7	Emmanuel Poissier	France	56:55
8	Gilles Rondy	France	56:57
9	Petar Stoychev	Bulgaria	56:58
10	John Flanagan	USA	56:59
11	Guilherme Bier	Brazil	57:01
12	Carl Gordon	New Zealand	57:05
13	Thomas Lurz	Germany	57:11
14	Greg Orphanides	Great Britain	57:12
15	Tim Cowan	Canada	57:45
16	Nace Majcen	Slovenia	57:55
17	Andrés Peréz González	Cuba	58:01
18	Fabio Lima	Brazil	58:03
19	Adrian Andermatt	Switzerland	58:10
20	Miodrag Vašić	Yugoslavia	58:17
21	Andre Wilde	Germany	58:28
22	Márton Tószegi	Hungary	59:15
23	Herbert Ray	Australia	59:16
24	Pavel Srb	Czech Republic	59:20
25	Hisham Masri	Syria	1:00:09
26	Georgios Tsianos	Greece	1:00:12
27	Mohamed Abdel Hamid	Egypt	1:00:36
28	Khalid Jugroo	Great Britain	1:01:09
29	Issei Higashijima	Japan	1:02:57
30	Mohammed Naeem Masri	Syria	1:08:13
--	Leigh Bool	Australia	DQ

Key: DQ = Disqualified
