= John Flanagan (swimmer) =

American swimmer and triathlete

Personal information
- Full name: John Flanagan III
- Nationality: United States
- Born: July 17, 1975 (age 51) South Carolina
- Height: 5 ft 11 in (180 cm)
- Spouse: n/a
- Children: 2

Sport
- Sport: Swimming
- Events: middle distance, long distance 5k,10k, 25k
- Strokes: Freestyle
- Club: Punahou School Aquatics, US National Open Water Swimming Team
- College team: Auburn University
- Coach: John Meister, David Marsh

Achievements and titles
- Regional finals: 3-time Swimming State Champion
Medal record
Men's swimming
Representing the United States
World Championships (LC)
Gold medal – first place	1998 Perth	Team 5 km

John Flanagan (born July 17, 1975, in Honolulu) is a male freestyle swimmer from the United States who specialized in middle distance and Open water distance events. He swam for Honolulu's exceptional Punhou School Swim Team where he was a three-time state champion in the 200 and 500-meter freestyle. After swimming for Auburn University, he won a 5 Km gold team medal at the 1998 World Aquatics Championships in Perth, Australia. He competed in and placed well in a number of USA Swimming National Championships through 2001, winning a 10 Km event at Daytona Beach in 2001, and receiving several second places in 5 Km events. In 2000, he won Hawaii's Surf and Sea North Shore Challenge, and was a five-time winner of the Waikiki Roughwater Challenge. In July 2010, he placed fourth in the 10 Km swim at the World Competitions in Fukuoka, Japan with a time of 2:01:6.5. He would later compete professionally in triathlon and in 2001 work as a swim coach at Kamehameha Swim Club in Honolulu.

Flanagan was born July 17, 1975, to Naval Commander John Flanagan Junior and wife Robin. He moved to Hawaii around 1985 with his family from South Carolina. John's wife Rae Sojot was also a Honolulu high school swimmer, and at age 10 won a gold age group medal in the Waikiki Roughwater Swim around 1988, as did John at age 13. The couple later met and married around 2004, and would have two daughters.

== High school swimming ==
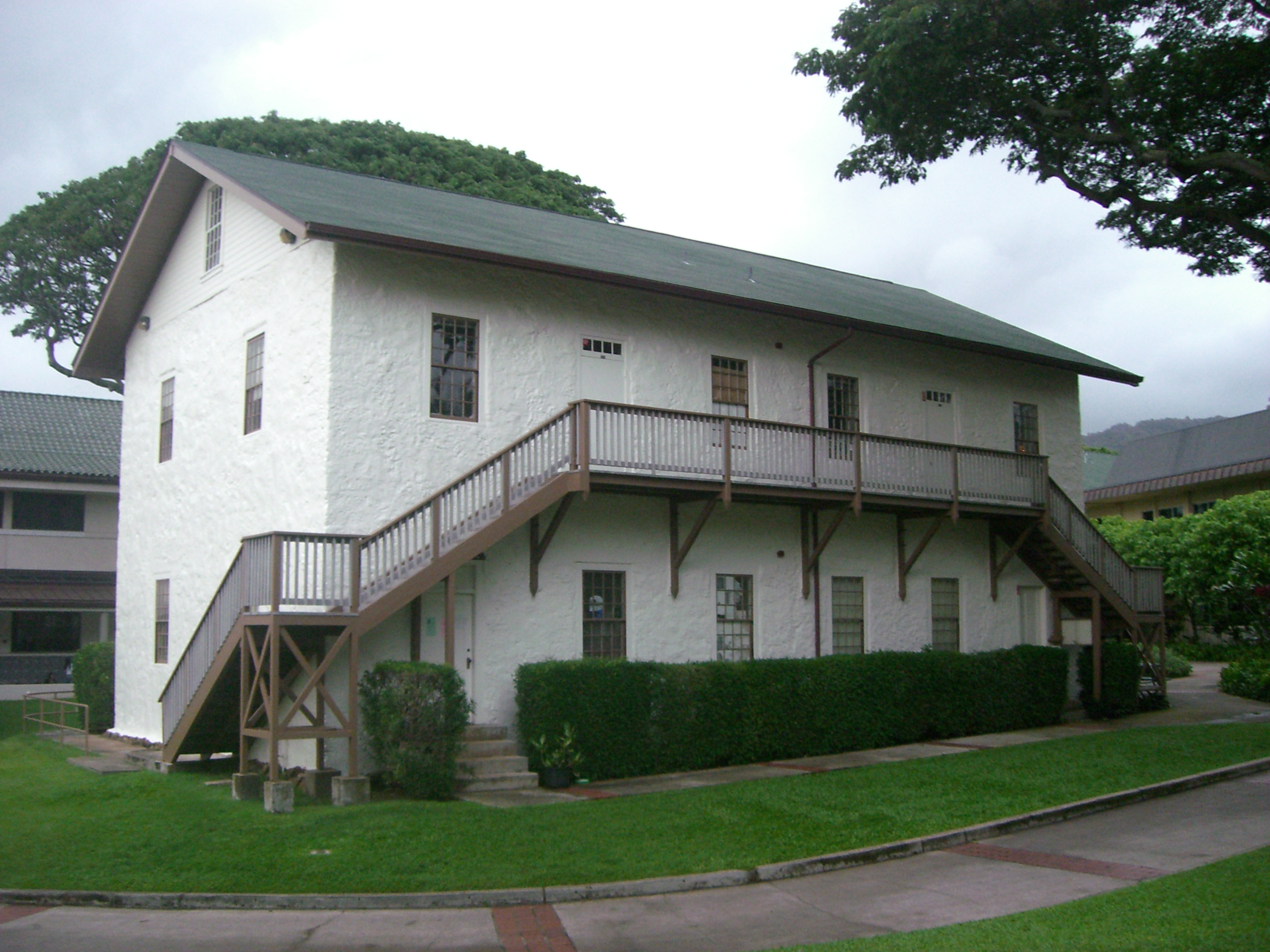
Punahou's Old School Hall

He attended and swam for the Punahou School in Honolulu, Hawaii beginning as a Freshman around 1990, where he was coached by John Meister. Punahou was an established, pricey, private college preparatory school near the University of Hawaii Campus with one of the top sports programs in the country. Around 16, John participated in America's Olympic Development Program's top-flight Eagle training camp in Colorado Springs for swimmers, with only 32 male high school swimmers participating. He also ran High School track and cross country with some success. At the Hawaii High School Athletic Association/Nissan Swim Championships on February 14, 1993, in his Senior year at Punahou School, he won the 200 and 500-yard Freestyle for the third consecutive year, making him a three-time state champion in two events. His brother, Kevin, placed fifth in the 500-yard freestyle. John also participated and won in the 200 and 400 freestyle relays. By 1993, Punahou, a dominant swim power, had won all but two Boy's Hawaii State Swim Championships since 1958. As early as fifteen, John began participating in local swim events, winning the 1000 meter fin swim at Ala Moana Beach Park in a time of 11:54, already participating in a Men's elite division.

Around his Senior Year, at the Hawaii Short Course State Championships, he won the 100 m free with an impressive time of 49.71, receiving a third in the 200 breast and a second in the 200 Back. In 2000, he competed in the 1000 yard freestyle with a winning time of 9:45:74.

== Auburn University swimming ==
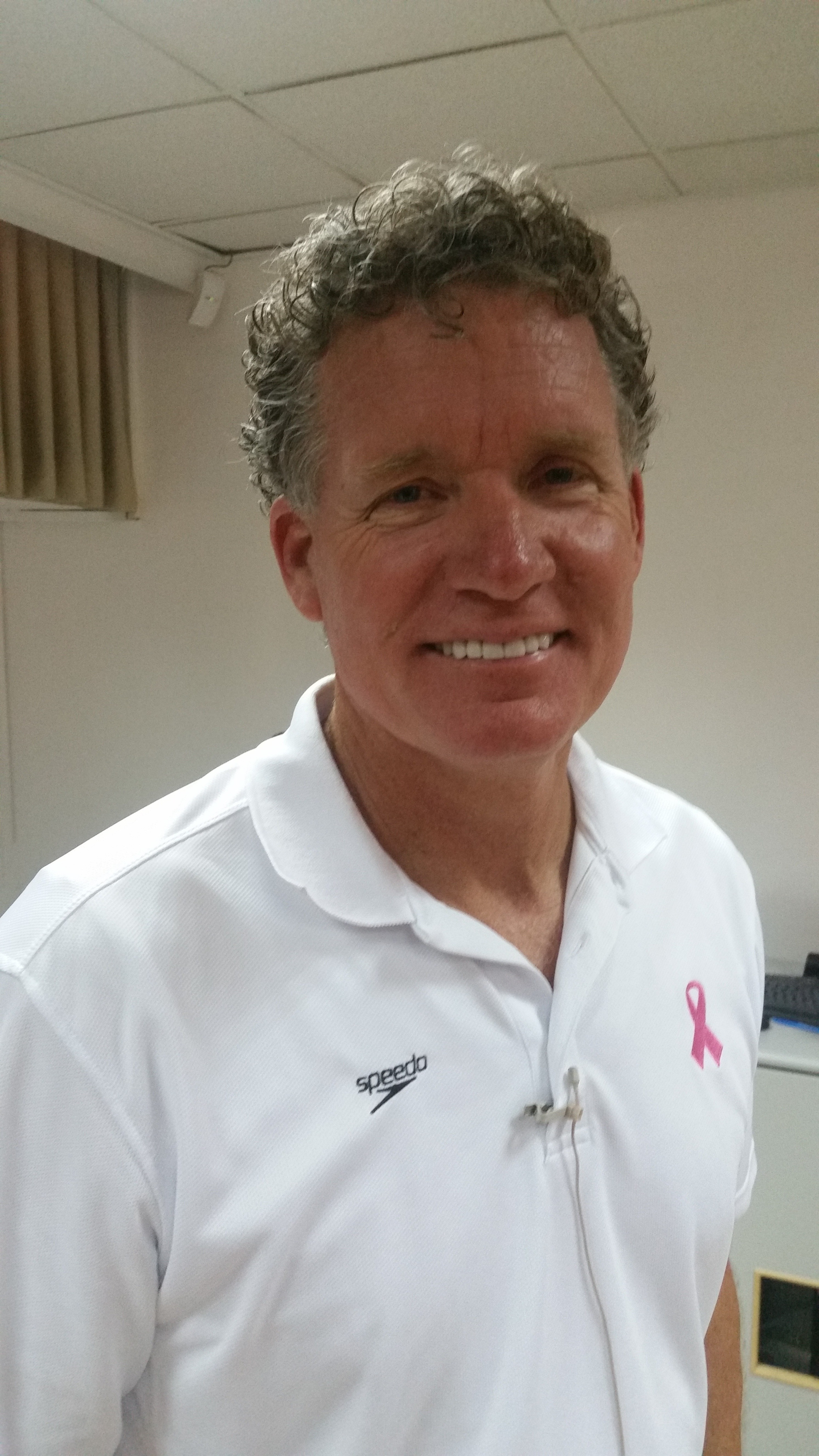
Auburn Coach David Marsh

Flanagan was coached by David Marsh at Auburn University. Marsh had already had championship teams, and Flanagan helped the team win an NCAA Swim Championship in 2001. A strong performer in college, he won the Southern Region Short Course Swimming Championships's 1,650 freestyle in March 1996 with a time of 15:24:09. After college, John was on the US National Open Water Swimming Team through the 2008 Olympic Trials. While at Auburn, at the US Swimming Senior Long Course Championships in July 1995, John was scheduled to swim the 400 Free, 400 Individual Medley, 200 Free, and 200 Butterfly.

== USA Swimming National Championships ==
On August 2, 1997, he placed second in the USA Swimming Open Water National Championships 5 Km event at Percy Priest Lake in Nashville Tennessee with a time of 50:17. In mid-August, 1997, he placed fourth in the United States Swimming Open Water Nationals in Honolulu, in the 15 Km with a time of 3:07:33.

On June 5, 1999, he placed third in a field of nineteen in the USA Swimming Open Water National Championships 25 Km event at Hawaii Cay to Waikiki at Honolulu with a time of 4:35:54.

On July 10, 1999, he placed second in the USA Swimming Open Water National Championships 10 Km event at Newport Beach, California with a time of 2:08:11.

On August 17, 2000, he placed third in the USA Swimming Open Water National Championships 5 Km event at Eagle Creek Reservoir in Indianapolis, Indiana with a time of 53:29.

== 1998 World Aquatics Championships 5 Km team gold ==
He represented his native country at the 1998 World Aquatics Championships in Perth, Western Australia, competing in one individual event (5 km), and winning a gold in the 5 Km team event. He has also competed in numerous Ironman competitions, including the Ironman World Championship in Kona, HI, where in 2009 he finished the swim portion of the race in first place.

== 5 Waikiki Roughwater wins; 2000, 2007, 2008, 2010, 2011 ==
On December 6, 1998, he won the 4.34 mile or 7 Km Hawaain Christmas Long Distance Invitational Roughwater Swim off Waikiki in 1:41:12 finishing about a minute ahead of the second-place finisher, Rick Heltzel. Losing his escort kayak, Flanagan went a bit off course, and had to swim some additional distance. In a rough current, Flanagan pulled ahead of Heltzel in the final 200 yards of the race, clinching an impressive win in an elite field of 38. The race follows the route of the Labor Day Waikiki Roughwater Swim, but repeats the course twice.

=== 5 Waikiki Roughwater wins ===
In September 2000, Flanagan won the 2.5 mile Waikiki Roughwater Swim from Sans Sousi to Duke Kohonomoku Beach with a time of 48:58. Flanagan won the race again in 2007 with a time of 44:17, in 2008 with a time of 52:45, in 2010 with a time of 47:12, and in 2011 with a time of 46:09. One of his favorite races, Flanagan finished sixth in 1992 at the age of only seventeen.

== Surf and Sea North Shore Challenge win ==
In July 2000, he comfortably won the local 2.4 Open Water Surf and Sea North Shore Challenge, from Ehukai Beach Park to Waimea Bay in a record time of 39:05.7.

== Olympic trials 2000 ==
In August 2000, in his first Olympic trial attempt, John tried out for the 1,500 meter race in Indianapolis, while his brother John hoped to try out for the 50 and 100 m sprints. In the Trials, John finished 27th out of 72 qualifiers, missing the selection process, but finished third in a 5 Km lake swim qualifying him for the World Championships in Waikiki. John did not try out for the Olympic Trials in 2008, placing second in an Iroquois Point Island Club Triathlon in late June 2008.

== 2000 FINA World Championships ==
On October 29, 2000, he placed 8th out of a field of 33 in the FINA World Championships in Honolulu at Waikiki with a 5 Km time of 59:40.

== USA Open Water National Champion at 10 Km ==
On June 24, 2001, he won the USA Swimming Open Water National Championships 10 Km event at Daytona Beach, Florida with a time of 2:01:58. Erica Rose won in the women's division. Schools of jellyfish made the swim more challenging. On July 16, 2001, he placed fourth in the Men's 10 Km Open Water competition at the World Championships at Fukuoka, Japan, with a time of 2:01:16.5

By the age of 35, around 2010, John had attempted and performed well in a number of triathlons as a professional.

== Coaching career ==
Since 2001, John has been head swim coach at Kamehameha Swim Club in Honolulu, along with his brother Kevin Flanagan, where they have won the last 31 Hawaii State Championships. John's daughter Kai was also a competitive swimmer and swam for Punahau School, as had John. John has also coached at Kamehaeha Schools.
