= Trpimir Kutle =

Croatian swimmer

Personal information
- Full name: Trpimir Kutle
- Nickname: Trpko
- Nationality: Croatia
- Born: 2 March 1976 (age 50) Zagreb

Sport
- Sport: Swimming
- Strokes: Freestyle
- Club: PK MEDVEŠČAK Zagreb

Trpimir Kutle (born 2 March 1976 in Zagreb) is a male freestyle swimmer from Croatia. He represented his native country at the 1998 World Aquatics Championships in Perth, Western Australia, competing in two individual events (5 km and 25 km freestyle). He also competed at the 1997 European Aquatics Championships in Seville, placing 13th in the 25 km event.
