= Sebastian Wiese =

German swimmer

Personal information
- Born: 12 January 1972 (age 54) Dresden, Bezirk Dresden, East Germany
Medal record
Men's swimming
Representing Germany
European Championships (LC)
Silver medal – second place	1993 Sheffield	1500 m freestyle
Bronze medal – third place	1991 Athens	1500 m freestyle

Sebastian Wiese (born 12 January 1972 in Dresden, Bezirk Dresden) is a retired freestyle swimmer from Germany, who represented his native country at two consecutive Summer Olympics, starting in 1992. He won a bronze and a silver medal at the European Long Course Championships in the men's 1500 m freestyle in the early 1990s.
