= Open water swimming at the 2005 World Aquatics Championships =

- Host city: Montreal, Canada
- Venue: Notre Dame Island
- Events: 6

These are the results of the open water swimming competition at the 2005 World Aquatics Championships, which took place in Montreal, Quebec, Canada.

The open water swimming course was held in the Olympic Rowing Basin on Notre Dame Island, and not in a river. This was the first time that open water swimming was held in a pool. The Montreal Olympic Rowing Basin was built for the 1976 Montreal Olympics.

== Medal table ==
Rank	Nation	Gold	Silver	Bronze	Total
1	Netherlands (NED)	2	0	1	3
2	Germany (GER)	1	2	1	4
3	United States (USA)	1	2	0	3
4	Russia (RUS)	1	0	0	1
4	Spain (ESP)	1	0	0	1
6	Italy (ITA)	0	1	2	3
7	Australia (AUS)	0	1	0	1
8	Bulgaria (BUL)	0	0	2	2
Totals (8 entries)		6	6	6	18

== Medal summary ==
=== Men ===
Event	Gold	Silver	Bronze
5 km	Thomas Lurz (GER); 51:17.2*	Chip Peterson (USA); 51:18.8	Simone Ercoli (ITA); 51:18.9
10 km	Chip Peterson (USA); 1:46:38.1*	Thomas Lurz (GER); 1:46:45.2	Petar Stoychev (BUL); 1:46:50.4
25 km	David Meca (ESP); 5:00:21.4	Brendan Capell (AUS); 5:00:23.6	Petar Stoychev (BUL); 5:00:28.4

  - Record(*)

=== Women ===
Event	Gold	Silver	Bronze
5 km	Larisa Ilchenko (RUS); 55:40.1*	Margy Keefe (USA); 55:44.3	Edith van Dijk (NED); 55:46.6
10 km	Edith van Dijk (NED); 1:56:00.5*	Frederica Vitale (ITA); 1:56:02.5	Britta Kamrau (GER); 1:56:04.0
25 km	Edith van Dijk (NED); 5:25:06.6	Britta Kamrau (GER); 5:25:06.9	Laura la Piana (ITA); 5:25:11.5

- Record(*)
