= Erica Rose (swimmer) =

American swimmer

Personal information
- Full name: Erica Lara Rose
- National team: USA Swimming
- Born: July 6, 1982 (age 44) Cleveland, Ohio
- Education: Northwestern U., U. Michigan
- Spouse: Brendan Dancik

Sport
- Sport: Swimming
- Strokes: Freestyle
- Club: Lake Erie Silver Dolphins; USA Swimming National Team
- College team: Northwestern
- Coach: Jimmy Tierney (Northwestern)
Medal record
Women's swimming
Representing the United States
World Championships (LC)
Gold medal – first place	1998 Perth	5 km open water
Gold medal – first place	1998 Perth	Team 5 km

Erica Lara Rose (born July 6, 1982) was an American competition swimmer who specialized in long-distance and open water events. Rose was a 5 km World Aquatics champion in Perth, Australia at only fifteen in 1998, was a four-time Pan American swim marathon gold medalist, a Pan Pacific 3.1 mile champion in 1997 in Melbourne, Australia, and a ten-time National Open Water swim marathon champion at 5 km, 10 km, and 25 km distances between 1997 and 2007. She competed with Cleveland's Lake Erie Silver Dolphins, Hawken High School Swim Team, the Northwestern University Swim Team, and for twelve years with the USA Swimming National Team.

== Early swimming career ==
Beginning at the age of seven, Rose swam for the Lake Erie Silver Dolphins Club, twice winning the state championship, and was a runner-up twice in the 500 free at Hawken School where she attended High School. Hawken was a college preparatory school with an outstanding Girls Swim Program, having won 24 consecutive titles in Girls Swimming from 1999 to 2022 as a member of the Ohio High School Athletic Association. Erica lettered in all four years in high school, from 1997- 2000. The Hawks won three state championships in her time at the Gates Mills campus of Hawken School Senior High School.

She won around ten Open Water Swim championships of various distances, and was a member of the USA Swimming National Team for twelve years.

== Pan Pacific Swim championship gold ==
At only fifteen, at the 1997 Pan Pacific Swimming Championships in August, she finished third in the 1500-metre freestyle, but she didn't receive a medal due to a meet rule that one country can only win two medals per event. Erica finished fifth in the 800-meter freestyle with a time of 8:39.92, but was out of medal contention.

=== First American Pan Pacific medal ===
Around seventeen in August 1999, she gave America its first women's medal in the Pan Pacifics, with a time of 58:11, in the 3.1 mile open water swim in Melbourne, Australia. She led all the way in the women's section, and American Klete Keller won in the men's section.

== Four Gold Pan American Championships ==
She was a four-time gold medalist at the Pan American Swim Championships, according to her 2014 Cleveland Hall of Fame Bio. One of her Pan American Championships was a 5K win in Ecuador in the Spring of 2006, and one was a 5K win in Panama in 2004.

== 1998 World Aquatics Championship ==
Again demonstrating exceptional skills having just turned 15, Rose won the gold medal in the 5-kilometer open water event, roughly 3.1 miles, at the 1998 World Aquatics Championships in Perth, Australia, with a time of 59 minutes, 23.5 seconds. In a race that saw controversy for fierce tussling for position, which included ripping off competitors's goggles and caps, Rose won with 1 minute, 35.3 seconds to spare over second place Dutchwoman Edith Van Dijk. Competitors were so closely packed near the finish, that there was only an eleven-second span between third and eleventh place. She also won a gold medal in the 5 km team event with American teammates John Flanagan, and Austin Ramirez.

Rated as one of the World's top distance swimmers, Erica was recruited to swim for Northwestern University, where she competed all four years in distance and individual medley events. She competed in the Big Ten Championship finals and an NCAA championship qualifier.

== Ten Open Water National championships, '97-'07 ==
=== Three 5 km wins ===
On August 2, 1997, at only fifteen, she won the USA Swimming Open Water National Championships 5 km at Piercy Priest Lake at Nashville, Tennessee, in a time of 52:18. In the summer of 1998, around only sixteen, she won the USA Swimming 5 km Open Water Championship in Clovis, California with a time of 46:49.75. On August 11, 1999, she won the USA Swimming Open Water National Championships 5 km at Long Lake in Minneapolis with a time of 50:16.

=== Five 10 km wins ===
Increasing her competitive distance at nineteen, on June 24, 2001, she won the Women's division for the 10 km USA Swimming Open Water National Championship at Daytona Beach with a time of 2:05:21. On July 8, 2002, she won the 10 km USA Swimming Open Water National Championship at Newport Beach, California, with a time of 2:11:23. At twenty, on September 7, 2002, she won the Women's Division for the 10 km for the FINA Marathon Swimming World Cup (10 km for the USA Swimming (FINA)) at Back Bay (Boston) in 2:15:29.

She was the USA Open Water National Championships 10k winner in 2003 with a time of 2:14:17 and in 2004 with a time of 2:04:56, both taking place off Fort Myers, Florida. She was the national 25K runner up in 2003.

=== Two 25km wins ===
She won the 25 km nationals twice. On June 6, 2006, around the age of twenty-four she won the woman's division in the USA Swimming Open Water National 25 km Championships circling Estero Island off Fort Myers in 5:29:13. Just turning twenty-five, she won the USA Swimming Open Water 25 km again on May 21, 2007, in Fort Myers, with a time of 6:12:51.

== Yangtze River Crossing win ==
Erica, on May 1, 2002, at nineteen, became the first woman and the first foreigner to win Wuhan, China's Yangtze River Speed Crossing, a 2000-meter race that traverses the rapid current of the Yangtze, China's longest River.

== Dubai, 2004 ==
She was team captain for the World Team that raced in Dubai on November 6, 2004, completing the 25 km with a time of 5:53:05, finishing 11th of 18 and completing the 10 km with a time of 2:08:37, finishing 16th of 24.

== Capri to Napoli 2006-7 ==
On September 9, 2006, she swam one of her more challenging races, a 36 km swim from the Island of Capri to the coast of Napoli, Italy, finishing 11th of 17 in 7:34:18, in an event known as Maratona del Golfo Capri-Napoli as part of the FINA Marathon Swimming World Cup. She noted that jellyfish stings made the swim particularly challenging. On August 29, she completed 10 and 25 km swims in Napoli but did not place. She did the race again on July 7, 2007, but did not place.

On May 19, 2007, she was fifth in the 10 km women's division for the USA Swimming Open Water National Championships at Fort Myers with a time of 1:51:29.52. Though she technically was near medal contention, it is not clear if the time qualified her to be chosen for the American Olympic Team which included a 10 km competition in 2008.

== Traversée internationale du lac St-Jean ==
In her early 20's, she finished well and improved her place in the cold and demanding 32 km Traversée internationale du lac St-Jean in Canada on three separate occasions:

- July 20, 2005 - 21st overall, and 5th woman, 8:05:03.
- July 29, 2006 - 7th overall, and 1st woman, 7:12:41.
- July 28, 2007 - 4th overall, in 7:21:06.

== Maratón Hernandarias-Paraná race ==
The Maraton Hernandarias-Parana, a downstream river swim in the Parana River in Argentina, is technically the longest professional race in the world in terms of distance at 88 km or 54.6 miles. Erica competed and placed well in the competition twice:

- 2005 - 6th in 10:05
- 2007 - 3rd in 9:40

She retired from elite competition around 2009, but often swam in the Big Shoulders 5k Open Water Swim in Chicago.

In the Fall of 2010, she swam about nine miles, completing 4 miles around Mackinac Island in the chilly waters of Lake Huron as a charity swim with Indiana-born distance swimmer Mallory Mead.

On August 5, 2009, she placed second overall in the amateur Harbor Springs Coastal Crawl United States Masters Swimming National Championships with a time of 2:22:44.

== Winning the Manhattan Island Marathon ==
Continuing to compete as an individual competitor, on June 18, 2011, she won the Manhattan Island Marathon Swim, an amateur competition. With a time of 7:29:46 at the age of twenty-seven, Rose won the exceptionally demanding 28.5 mile marathon, one of the world's longest swimming events.

=== Honors ===
She was listed as a member of the USA Swimming National Team for twelve years., and in 2014 was inducted into the Greater Cleveland, Ohio Sports Hall of Fame.

In late 2010, as a member of an investigative committee, Rose was a participant in the Open Water Swimming Safety task force sponsored by USA Swimming that reviewed and made recommendations concerning the death of swimmer Fran Crippen at a professional 10 km swim on October 23 at Dubai sanctioned by FINA. Working as the Athlete Representative with a Technical Expert, Events Expert, and a Medical Consultant, FINA accepted their recommendations, as a way to improve safety in their open water swimming events. The water at the Dubai swim was around 84F which may have caused the dehydration and heat exhaustion that caused Crippen to drown. Rose discussed the need to set an upper limit on temperature ranges in marathon swims, as well as lower limits which are already set.

In 2010, Erica moved to Ann Arbor, Michigan. At the University of Michigan in Ann Arbor she worked as a Recruitment Coordinator in the Office of Development and received a degree in global public health and business administration. In the summer of 2017, she married Brendan Dancik. At the University of Michigan in Ann Arbor she worked as a Recruitment Coordinator in the Office of Development and received a degree in global public health and business administration.
