= Open water swimming at the 2001 World Aquatics Championships – Men's 25 km =

Men's 25 km at the 2001 World Aquatics Championships
- Location: Fukuoka, Japan
- Dates: 21 July

The Men's 25 km Open Water event at the 2001 World Aquatics Championships was held on July 21, 2001 in Fukuoka.

== Results ==
Rank	Swimmer	Nationality	12.5 km	Time
1st place, gold medalist(s)	Yury Kudinov	Russia	2:40:04	5:25:32
2nd place, silver medalist(s)	Stéphane Gomez	France	2:40:01	5:26:00
3rd place, bronze medalist(s)	Stéphane Lecat	France	2:39:53	5:26:36
4	Fabio Fusi	Italy	2:40:00	5:28:16
5	Mark Saliba	Australia	2:40:05	5:29:17
6	Mark Leonard	USA	2:39:48	5:31:53
7	Christof Wandratsch	Germany	2:39:56	5:33:36
8	Andrés Peréz González	Cuba	2:40:26	5:34:37
9	Miodrag Vašić	Yugoslavia	2:40:07	5:35:22
10	Anton Sanachev	Russia	2:40:06	5:36:21
11	Liam Weseloh	Canada	2:40:23	5:37:53
12	John Kenny	USA	2:40:03	5:39:26
13	Nace Majcen	Slovenia	2:40:40	5:40:24
14	Pavel Srb	Czech Republic	2:41:16	5:42:49
15	Hiroki Hikida	Japan	2:42:27	5:44:15
16	Rostislav Vítek	Czech Republic	2:40:37	5:48:16
17	Simone Menoni	Italy	2:40:24	5:56:19
18	Hisham Masri	Syria	2:40:22	5:56:19
19	Levente Nagy-Pál	Hungary	2:54:26	6:00:03
20	Takashi Sugisawa	Japan	2:54:20	6:04:28
21	Christian Hansmann	Germany	3:00:13	6:05:57
22	Mohamed Abdel Hamid	Egypt	2:58:34	6:13:02
23	Gregory Fuentes	Ecuador	2:54:34	6:16:45
24	Balázs Cselényi	Hungary	2:57:55	6:37:51
--	Carlos Scanavino	Uruguay	2:46:57	DNF

Key: DNF = Did not finish, DQ = Disqualified
