= World Aquatics Championships =

- Status: Active
- Genre: Global sporting event
- Date: Two weeks (usually mid-year)
- Frequency: Biennial
- Location: Various host cities
- Years active: 52 years
- Inaugurated: 1973
- Most recent: Singapore 2025
- Previous event: Doha 2024
- Next event: Budapest 2027
- Major events: Swimming, Diving, Water Polo, Artistic Swimming, Open Water Swimming, High Diving
- Organiser: World Aquatics
- Sponsor: 361° Myrtha Pools; Nongfu Spring; Omega; Sony; Yakult
- Editions: 22 (including 2025)
- Website: worldaquatics.com
- 2025 World Aquatics Championships

The World Aquatics Championships, formerly the FINA World Championships, are the World Championships for six aquatic disciplines: swimming, diving, high diving, open water swimming, artistic swimming, and water polo. The championships are staged by World Aquatics, formerly known as FINA (Fédération internationale de natation), the international federation recognised by the International Olympic Committee (IOC) for administering international competitions in water sports. The championships are World Aquatics' largest and main event traditionally held biennially every odd year, with all six of the aquatic disciplines contested every championships. Dr. Hal Henning, FINA's president from 1972 through 1976, and their first American President, was highly instrumental in starting the first World Aquatics Championships, and in retaining the number of swimming events in the Olympics, which gave an advantage to nations with larger, more balanced swim teams.

The championships were first staged in 1973 in Belgrade, Yugoslavia, with competitions held in swimming, diving, synchronised swimming and water polo. In 1991 open water swimming was added to the championships as a fifth discipline. In 2013 high diving was added to the championships as a sixth discipline. In 2017 the synchronised swimming discipline was renamed to artistic swimming.

Prior to the 9th World Aquatics Championships in Fukuoka in 2001, the championships had been staged at various intervals of two to four years. From 2001 to 2019 the championships were held biennially in odd years. Due to interruptions from the COVID-19 pandemic, travel restrictions, host venues withdrawing from hosting championships and World Aquatics' withdrawing the rights to host championships, the championships held annually from 2022 to 2024 until back to biennial from 2025 onwards.

The World Aquatics Open Water Swimming Championships (also known as 'Open Water Worlds') is part of the World Aquatics Championships. Additional standalone editions of the Open Water Championships were also held in the even years from 2000 to 2010. The World Aquatics Masters Championships (also known as 'Masters Worlds) is open to athletes 25 years and above (30+ years in water polo) in each aquatics discipline excluding high diving and has been held as part of the World Aquatics Championships since 2015. Prior to this, the Masters Championship was held separately, biennially in even years.

Athletes from all current 208 World Aquatics member federations are eligible to compete at the championships, along with athletes considered 'Neutral Independent Athletes' under the rules of World Aquatics and athletes from the 'World Aquatics Refugee Team'. The 2019 championships set the record for the most athletes participating (2,623). At the recent 2025 championships athletes participated from 206 nations: 203 member federations, 1 Athlete Refugee Team and 2 Neutral Athletes teams.

== Championships ==
Member federations referred to as winners, second, and third, in the table below, are the top three nation's listed on the medal tally based on the standard method of ranking (being total gold medals, followed by total silver medals, and then total bronze medals).

Year	Dates	Edition	Location	Nations	Athletes	Events	Events details	Winner	Second	Third	Most medals
1973	31 August – 9 September	1	(Socialist Federal Republic of Yugoslavia) Belgrade, Yugoslavia	47	686	37	18 (M), 19 (W)	United States	East Germany	Italy	United States
1975	19–27 July	2	Cali, Colombia	39	682	37	18 (M), 19 (W)	United States	East Germany	Hungary	United States
1978	20–28 August	3	West Berlin, West Germany	49	828	37	18 (M), 19 (W)	United States*	Soviet Union	Canada	United States
1982	29 July – 8 August	4	Guayaquil, Ecuador	52	848	37	18 (M), 19 (W)	United States	East Germany	Soviet Union	United States
1986	13–23 August	5	Madrid, Spain	34	1,119	41	19 (M), 22 (W)	East Germany	United States	Canada	United States
1991	3–13 January	6	Perth, Australia	60	1,142	45	21 (M), 24 (W)	United States	China	Hungary	United States
1994	1–11 September	7	Rome, Italy	102	1,400	45	21 (M), 24 (W)	China	United States	Russia	China
1998	8–17 January	8	Perth, Australia	121	1,371	53	24 (M), 27 (W), 2 (X)	United States	Russia	Australia	United States
2001	16–29 July	9	Fukuoka, Japan	134	1,498	61	29 (M), 32 (W)	Australia	China	United States	United States
2003	12–27 July	10	Barcelona, Spain	157	2,015	62	29 (M), 33 (W)	United States	Russia	Australia	United States
2005	16–31 July	11	Montreal, Canada	144	1,784	62	29 (M), 33 (W)	United States	Australia	China	United States
2007	18 March – 1 April	12	Melbourne, Australia	167	2,158	65	29 (M), 36 (W)	United States	Russia	Australia	United States
2009	17 July – 2 August	13	Rome, Italy	185	2,556	65	29 (M), 36 (W)	United States	China	Russia	United States and China
2011	16–31 July	14	Shanghai, China	181	2,220	66	29 (M), 36 (W), 1 (X)	United States	China	Russia	China
2013	19 July – 4 August	15	Barcelona, Spain	181	2,293	68	30 (M), 37 (W), 1 (X)	United States	China	Russia	United States
2015	24 July – 9 August	16	Kazan, Russia	190	2,400	75	30 (M), 37 (W), 8 (X)	China	United States	Russia	China
2017	14–30 July	17	Budapest, Hungary	182	2,360	75	30 (M), 37 (W), 8 (X)	United States	China	Russia	United States
2019	12–28 July	18	Gwangju, South Korea	192	2,623	76	30 (M), 38 (W), 8 (X)	China	United States	Russia	United States
2022	18 June – 3 July	19	Budapest, Hungary	183	2,034	74	29 (M), 37 (W), 8 (X)	United States	China	Italy	United States**
2023	14–30 July	20	Fukuoka, Japan	195	2,392	75	31 (M), 33 (W), 11 (X)	China	Australia	United States	United States
2024	2–18 February	21	Doha, Qatar	199	2,603	75	31 (M), 33 (W), 11 (X)	China*	United States	Australia	China
2025	11 July – 3 August	22	Singapore	206	2,434	77	32 (M), 34 (W), 11 (X)	China	Australia	United States	China
2027	26 June – 18 July	23	Budapest, Hungary								
2029		24	Beijing, China								

* Record by number of gold medals – United States (23 gold medals, 1978) and China (23 gold medals, 2024)
** Record by number of total medals – United States (49 medals in total, 2022)

== All-time medal table ==
Updated after the 2025 World Aquatics Championships.

Rank	Nation	Gold	Silver	Bronze	Total
1	United States	312	257	201	770
2	China	222	136	106	464
3	Australia	130	134	98	362
4	Russia	105	73	62	240
5	Italy	53	73	81	207
6	East Germany	51	44	27	122
7	Germany	48	67	74	189
8	Hungary	44	37	36	117
9	Great Britain	37	39	67	143
10	France	37	38	39	114
11	Canada	34	57	75	166
12	Netherlands	25	42	36	103
13	Sweden	21	21	18	60
14	Japan	20	53	82	155
15	Spain	18	45	40	103
16	Brazil	17	15	19	51
17	Soviet Union	16	28	28	72
18	South Africa	14	9	18	41
19	Ukraine	13	20	30	63
20	West Germany	8	7	12	27
21	Romania	7	2	9	18
22	Poland	6	12	12	30
23	Neutral Athletes B (Note: At the 2025 World Championships, in accordance with sanctions imposed following by the 2022 Russian invasion of Ukraine, athletes from Russia were not permitted to use the name, flag, or anthem of Russia. They instead participated as "Neutral Athletes B (NAB)" and under the World Aquatics flag.)	6	8	4	18
24	Greece	6	7	10	23
25	Tunisia	6	3	4	13
26	Lithuania	6	3	3	12
27	Denmark	4	9	8	21
28	Zimbabwe	4	5	0	9
29	South Korea	4	2	6	12
30	Serbia	4	2	1	7
31	Mexico	3	18	22	43
32	Croatia	3	3	4	10
33	Finland	3	2	2	7
34	New Zealand	2	6	8	16
35	Austria	2	6	6	14
36	Belarus	2	1	3	6
36	Yugoslavia	2	1	3	6
38	Portugal	2	1	1	4
39	Ireland	2	0	0	2
40	Switzerland	1	8	2	11
41	North Korea	1	4	3	8
42	Belgium	1	2	3	6
43	Hong Kong	1	2	1	4
43	Norway	1	2	1	4
45	Malaysia	1	1	6	8
46	Bulgaria	1	1	4	6
47	Colombia	1	1	2	4
47	Costa Rica	1	1	2	4
47	Serbia and Montenegro	1	1	2	4
50	Kazakhstan	1	0	1	2
51	Suriname	1	0	0	1
52	Slovakia	0	3	2	5
53	Czech Republic	0	3	0	3
54	Neutral Athletes A (Note: At the 2025 World Championships, in accordance with sanctions imposed following by the 2022 Russian invasion of Ukraine, athletes from Belarus were not permitted to use the name, flag, or anthem of Russia. They instead participated as "Neutral Athletes A (NAA)" and under the World Aquatics flag.)	0	1	2	3
55	Cuba	0	1	1	2
55	Czechoslovakia	0	1	1	2
55	Iceland	0	1	1	2
55	Jamaica	0	1	1	2
59	Ecuador	0	1	0	1
59	Israel	0	1	0	1
59	Montenegro	0	1	0	1
62	Egypt	0	0	5	5
63	Argentina	0	0	2	2
63	Neutral Independent Athletes (Note: At the 2024 World Championships, in accordance with sanctions imposed following by the 2022 Russian invasion of Ukraine, athletes from Belarus were not permitted to use the name, flag, or anthem of Belarus. They instead participated as "Neutral Independent Athletes (NIA)" and under the World Aquatics flag.)	0	0	2	2
63	Singapore	0	0	2	2
66	Bosnia and Herzegovina	0	0	1	1
66	Kyrgyzstan	0	0	1	1
66	Monaco	0	0	1	1
66	Puerto Rico	0	0	1	1
66	Trinidad and Tobago	0	0	1	1
66	Venezuela	0	0	1	1
Totals (71 entries)		1,311	1,323	1,307	3,941

== Multiple gold medalists ==
Boldface denotes active athletes and highest medal count per type.

Rank	Athlete	Country	Gender	Discipline	From	To	Gold	Silver	Bronze	Total
1	Michael Phelps	United States	M	Swimming	2001	2011	**26**	6	1	**33**
2	**Katie Ledecky**	United States	F	Swimming	2013	2025	23	6	1	30
3	Svetlana Romashina	Russia	F	Artistic swimming	2005	2019	21	–	–	21
4	Natalia Ishchenko	Russia	F	Artistic swimming	2005	2015	19	2	–	21
5	Ryan Lochte	United States	M	Swimming	2005	2015	18	5	4	27
6	Svetlana Kolesnichenko	Russia	F	Artistic swimming	2011	2019	16	–	–	16
7	**Caeleb Dressel**	United States	M	Swimming	2017	2022	15	2	–	17
8	**Sarah Sjöström**	Sweden	F	Swimming	2009	2024	14	8	3	25
9	Alla Shishkina	Russia	F	Artistic swimming	2009	2019	14	–	–	14
10	**Simone Manuel**	United States	F	Swimming	2013	2025	13	5	2	20

== Disciplines, events & medalists ==
Except where specified below, there are male and female categories for each event.

=== Swimming (since 1973) ===
Distance	Free	Back	Breast	Fly	I.M.	Free relay	Medley relay	Mixed free relay	Mixed medley relay
50 m	●	●	●	●					
100 m	●	●	●	●					
200 m	●	●	●	●	●				
400 m	●				●	●	●	●	●
800 m	●					●			
1500 m	●								

=== Diving (since 1973) ===
Men's and women's events:

- 1 m springboard
- 3 m springboard
- 10 m platform
- synchronized 3 m springboard
- synchronized 10 m platform

Mixed events:

- synchronized 3 m springboard
- synchronized 10 m platform
- 3 m springboard / 10 m platform team

=== Artistic swimming (since 1973) ===
Except for Acrobatic routine, all events include technical and free routines, with medals awarded separately.

- Solo, including men's solo since 2023
- Duet, including mixed pair (male-female) since 2015
- Team (since 2023 open event to men and women)
- Acrobatic routine since 2023 (open event to men and women)

=== Water polo (since 1973) ===
- Men's tournament
- Women's tournament

=== Open water swimming (since 1991) ===
- 3 km knockout sprints
- 5 km
- 10 km
- Mixed relay

=== High diving (since 2013) ===
- 27 m (men only)
- 20 m (women only)

== See also ==
- World Aquatics
- World Aquatics Swimming Championships (25m)
- World Aquatics Junior Swimming Championships
- World Aquatics Swimming World Cup
- World Aquatics Masters Championships
- FINA Marathon Swim World Series
- List of World Aquatics Championships medalists in swimming (men)
- List of World Aquatics Championships medalists in swimming (women)
- List of World Championships records in swimming
- Major achievements in swimming by nation
