= List of medalists at the European Open Water Swimming Championships =

This is a list of medalists at the European Open Water Swimming Championships.

In certain years, open water swimming was not part of the LEN European Aquatics Championships, or the European Aquatics Championships were not held that year. Instead a separate European Open Water Swimming Championships was held.

== Men ==
was part of the European Aquatics Championships
was a stand alone edition

=== 5 km ===
Year	Gold	Silver	Bronze
1989 Stari Grad	Igor Majcen (YUG)	Jaromír Henyš (TCH)	Arthur de Rouw (NED)
1991 Terracina	Stefano Rubaudo (ITA)	Davide Giacchino (ITA)	Hans van Goor (NED)
1993 Slapy	Marco Formentini (ITA)	Claudio Gargaro (ITA)	Alex Havranek (CZE)
1995 Vienna	Aleksej Akatiev (RUS)	Christof Wandratsch (GER)	Samuele Pampana (ITA)
1997 Sevilla	Aleksej Akatiev (RUS)	Evgenij Bezručenko (RUS)	Luca Baldini (ITA)
1999 Istanbul	Evgenij Bezručenko (RUS)	Aleksej Akatiev (RUS)	Samuele Pampana (ITA)
2000 Helsinki	Luca Baldini (ITA)	Fabio Venturini (ITA)	David Meca (ESP)
2002 Berlin	Luca Baldini (ITA)	Thomas Lurz (GER)	Stefano Rubaudo (ITA)
2004 Madrid	Fabio Venturini (ITA)	Alan Bircher (GBR)	Stefano Rubaudo (ITA)
2006 Budapest	Thomas Lurz (GER)	Christian Hein (GER)	Simone Ercoli (ITA)
2008 Dubrovnik	Spyridon Gianniotis (GRE)	Jan Wolfgarten (GER)	Thomas Lurz (GER)
2010 Budapest	Luca Ferretti (ITA)	Simone Ercoli (ITA)	Simone Ruffini (ITA); Spyridon Gianniotis (GRE)
2011 Eilat	Simone Ercoli (ITA)	Jan Wolfgarten (GER)	Michael Dmitriev (ISR)
2012 Piombino	Kirill Abrosimov (RUS)	Andreas Waschburger (GER)	Luca Ferretti (ITA)
2014 Berlin	Daniel Fogg (GBR)	Rob Muffels (GER)	Thomas Lurz (GER)
2016 Hoorn	Kirill Abrosimov (RUS)	Federico Vanelli (ITA)	Caleb Hughes (GBR)
2018 Glasgow	Kristóf Rasovszky (HUN)	Axel Reymond (FRA)	Logan Fontaine (FRA)
2020 Budapest	Gregorio Paltrinieri (ITA)	Marc-Antoine Olivier (FRA)	Dario Verani (ITA)
2022 Rome	Gregorio Paltrinieri (ITA)	Domenico Acerenza (ITA)	Marc-Antoine Olivier (FRA)

=== 10 km ===
Year	Gold	Silver	Bronze
2002 Berlin	Vladimir D'jatčin (RUS)	Evgenij Koškarov (RUS)	Luca Baldini (ITA)
2004 Madrid	Evgenij Koškarov (RUS)	Massimiliano Parla (ITA)	Anton Sanačev (RUS)
2006 Budapest	Thomas Lurz (GER)	Maarten van der Weijden (NED)	Christian Hein (GER)
2008 Dubrovnik	Thomas Lurz (GER)	Evgeny Drattsev (RUS)	Toni Franz (GER)
2010 Budapest	Thomas Lurz (GER)	Valerio Cleri (ITA)	Evgeny Drattsev (RUS)
2011 Eilat	Thomas Lurz (GER)	Vladimir Dyatchin (RUS)	Ihor Snitko (UKR)
2012 Piombino	Kirill Abrosimov (RUS)	Andreas Waschburger (GER)	Nicola Bolzonello (ITA)
2014 Berlin	Ferry Weertman (NED)	Thomas Lurz (GER)	Evgeny Drattsev (RUS)
2016 Hoorn	Ferry Weertman (NED)	Jack Burnell (GBR)	Marc-Antoine Olivier (FRA)
2018 Glasgow	Ferry Weertman (NED)	Kristóf Rasovszky (HUN)	Rob Muffels (GER)
2020 Budapest	Gregorio Paltrinieri (ITA)	Marc-Antoine Olivier (FRA)	Florian Wellbrock (GER)
2022 Rome	Domenico Acerenza (ITA)	Marc-Antoine Olivier (FRA)	Logan Fontaine (FRA)

=== 25 km ===
Year	Gold	Silver	Bronze
1989 Stari Grad	Nace Majcen (YUG)	Michal Špaček (TCH)	Dragan Kvrgić (YUG)
1991 Terracina	Christof Wandratsch (GER)	Sergio Chiarandini (ITA)	Urs Kohlhaas (SUI)
1993 Slapy	Dario Taraboi (ITA)	Hans van Goor (NED)	Attila Molnar (HUN)
1995 Vienna	Christof Wandratsch (GER)	Aleksey Akatyev (RUS)	Stéphane Lecat (FRA)
1997 Sevilla	Aleksey Akatyev (RUS)	Christof Wandratsch (GER); Stéphane Lecat (FRA)	None awarded
1999 Istanbul	Aleksey Akatyev (RUS)	Anton Sanachev (RUS)	André Wilde (GER)
2000 Helsinki	Stéphane Lecat (FRA)	David Meca (ESP)	Fabio Fusi (ITA)
2002 Berlin	Yuri Kudinov (RUS)	Gilles Rondy (FRA)	David Meca (ESP)
2004 Madrid	Yevgeniy Kochkarov (RUS)	David Meca (ESP)	Petar Stoychev (BUL)
2006 Budapest	Gilles Rondy (FRA)	Anton Sanachev (RUS)	Stéphane Gomez (FRA)
2008 Dubrovnik	Valerio Cleri (ITA)	Joanes Hedel (FRA)	Dmitry Solovnev (RUS)
2010 Budapest	Valerio Cleri (ITA)	Bertrand Venturi (FRA)	Joanes Hedel (FRA)
2011 Eilat	Brian Ryckeman (BEL)	Petar Stoychev (BUL)	Joanes Hedel (FRA)
2012 Piombino	Petar Stoychev (BUL)	Arseniy Lavrentyev (POR)	Axel Reymond (FRA)
2014 Berlin	Axel Reymond (FRA)	Evgeny Drattsev (RUS)	Edoardo Stochino (ITA)
2016 Hoorn	Axel Reymond (FRA)	Matteo Furlan (ITA)	Edoardo Stochino (ITA)
2018 Glasgow	Kristóf Rasovszky (HUN)	Kirill Belyaev (RUS)	Matteo Furlan (ITA)
2020 Budapest	Axel Reymond (FRA)	Matteo Furlan (ITA)	Kirill Abrosimov (RUS)
2022 Rome	Mario Sanzullo (ITA)	Dario Verani (ITA)	Matteo Furlan (ITA)

== Women ==
=== 5 km ===
Year	Gold	Silver	Bronze
1989 Stari Grad	Anamarija Petričević (YUG)	Wandy Kater (NED)	Tanja Godina (YUG)
1991 Terracina	Bea Berzlanovits (HUN)	Yvetta Hlaváčová (TCH)	Mara Data (ITA)
1993 Slapy	Olga Šplíchalová (CZE)	Carla Geurts (NED)	Eva Novaková (CZE)
1995 Vienna	Rita Kovács (HUN)	Peggy Büchse (GER)	Valeria Casprini (ITA)
1997 Sevilla	Peggy Büchse (GER)	Valeria Casprini (ITA)	Rita Kovács (HUN)
1999 Istanbul	Peggy Büchse (GER)	Viola Valli (ITA)	Britta Kamrau (GER)
2000 Helsinki	Peggy Büchse (GER)	Britta Kamrau (GER)	Jana Pechanová (CZE)
2002 Berlin	Viola Valli (ITA)	Hanna Miluska (SUI)	Nadine Pastor (GER)
2004 Madrid	Britta Kamrau (GER)	Stefanie Biller (GER)	Xenia López (ESP)
2006 Budapest	Ekaterina Seliverstova (RUS)	Cathi Dietrich (FRA)	Jana Pechanová (CZE); Larisa Ilchenko (RUS)
2008 Dubrovnik	Rachele Bruni (ITA)	Britta Kamrau (GER)	Alice Franco (ITA)
2010 Budapest	Ekaterina Seliverstova (RUS)	Kalliopi Araouzou (GRE)	Marianna Lymperta (GRE)
2011 Eilat	Rachele Bruni (ITA)	Jana Pechanová (CZE)	Coralie Codevelle (FRA)
2012 Piombino	Rachele Bruni (ITA)	Kalliopi Araouzou (GRE)	Jana Pechanová (CZE)
2014 Berlin	Isabelle Härle (GER)	Sharon van Rouwendaal (NED)	Mireia Belmonte (ESP)
2016 Hoorn	Danielle Huskisson (GBR)	Finnia Wunram (GER)	Sharon van Rouwendaal (NED)
2018 Glasgow	Sharon van Rouwendaal (NED)	Leonie Beck (GER)	Rachele Bruni (ITA)
2020 Budapest	Sharon van Rouwendaal (NED)	Giulia Gabbrielleschi (ITA)	Océane Cassignol (FRA)
2022 Rome	Sharon van Rouwendaal (NED)	María de Valdés (ESP)	Giulia Gabbrielleschi (ITA)

=== 10 km ===
Year	Gold	Silver	Bronze
2002 Berlin	Edith van Dijk (NED)	Angela Maurer (GER)	Britta Kamrau (GER)
2004 Madrid	Britta Kamrau (GER)	Marta Nogues (ESP)	Angela Maurer (GER)
2006 Budapest	Angela Maurer (GER)	Rita Kovács (HUN)	Jana Pechanová (CZE)
2008 Dubrovnik	Larisa Ilchenko (RUS)	Martina Grimaldi (ITA)	Alice Franco (ITA)
2010 Budapest	Linsy Heister (NED)	Giorgia Consiglio (ITA)	Angela Maurer (GER)
2011 Eilat	Martina Grimaldi (ITA)	Rachele Bruni (ITA)	Nadine Reichert (GER)
2012 Piombino	Martina Grimaldi (ITA)	Angela Maurer (GER)	Jana Pechanová (CZE)
2014 Berlin	Sharon van Rouwendaal (NED)	Éva Risztov (HUN)	Aurora Ponselè (ITA)
2016 Hoorn	Rachele Bruni (ITA); Aurélie Muller (FRA)	None awarded	Arianna Bridi (ITA)
2018 Glasgow	Sharon van Rouwendaal (NED)	Giulia Gabbrielleschi (ITA)	Esmee Vermeulen (NED)
2020 Budapest	Sharon van Rouwendaal (NED)	Anna Olasz (HUN)	Rachele Bruni (ITA)
2022 Rome	Leonie Beck (GER)	Ginevra Taddeucci (ITA)	Angélica André (POR)

=== 25 km ===
Year	Gold	Silver	Bronze
1989 Stari Grad	Rita Lazar (HUN)	Diana Simonović (YUG)	Annemie Landmeters (BEL)
1991 Terracina	Eliane Fieschi (SUI)	Samantha Cavadini (SUI)	Rita Kovács (HUN)
1993 Slapy	Anne Chagnaud (FRA)	Gea Veldhuizen (NED)	Wandy Kater (NED)
1995 Vienna	Peggy Büchse (GER)	Edith van Dijk (NED)	Yvetta Hlaváčová (CZE)
1997 Sevilla	Rita Kovács (HUN)	Valeria Casprini (ITA)	Edith van Dijk (NED)
1999 Istanbul	Olga Gusseva (RUS)	Angela Maurer (GER)	Britta Kamrau (GER)
2000 Helsinki	Peggy Büchse (GER)	Edith van Dijk (NED)	Valeria Casprini (ITA)
2002 Berlin	Edith van Dijk (NED)	Olesiya Shalygina (RUS)	Natalia Pankina (RUS)
2004 Madrid	Britta Kamrau (GER)	Natalia Pankina (RUS)	Ivanka Moralieva (BUL)
2006 Budapest	Angela Maurer (GER)	Natalia Pankina (RUS)	Stefanie Biller (GER)
2008 Dubrovnik	Margarita Dominguez (ESP)	Britta Kamrau (GER)	Anna Uvarova (RUS)
2010 Budapest	Olga Beresnyeva (UKR)	Angela Maurer (GER)	Martina Grimaldi (ITA)
2011 Eilat	Alice Franco (ITA)	Margarita Dominguez (ESP)	Jana Pechanová (CZE)
2012 Piombino	Alice Franco (ITA)	Margarita Dominguez (ESP)	Martina Grimaldi (ITA)
2014 Berlin	Martina Grimaldi (ITA)	Anna Olasz (HUN)	Angela Maurer (GER)
2016 Hoorn	Martina Grimaldi (ITA)	Olga Kozydub (RUS)	Caroline Jouisse (FRA)
2018 Glasgow	Arianna Bridi (ITA)	Sharon van Rouwendaal (NED)	Lara Grangeon (FRA)
2020 Budapest	Lea Boy (GER)	Lara Grangeon (FRA)	Barbara Pozzobon (ITA)
2022 Rome	Caroline Jouisse (FRA)	Barbara Pozzobon (ITA)	Veronica Santoni (ITA)

== Mixed team ==
=== 5 km ===
Year	Gold	Silver	Bronze
2008 Dubrovnik	Italy; Andrea Volpini; Rachele Bruni; Luca Ferretti	Russia; Daniil Serebrennikov; Evgeny Drattsev; Ekaterina Seliverstova	Germany; Jan Wolfgarten; Britta Kamrau; Thomas Lurz
2011 Eilat	Italy; Simone Ercoli; Luca Ferretti; Rachele Bruni	Germany; Hendrik Rijkens; Rob Muffels; Svenja Zihsler	France; Sebastien Fraysse; Damien Cattin Vidal; Coralie Codevelle
2012 Piombino	Italy; Luca Ferretti; Simone Ercoli; Rachele Bruni	Greece; Marios Kalafatis; Georgios Arniakos; Kalliopi Araouzou	Germany; Thomas Lurz; Andreas Waschburger; Angela Maurer
2016 Hoorn	Italy; Rachele Bruni; Simone Ruffini; Federico Vanelli	Germany; Finnia Wunram; Rob Muffels; Andreas Waschburger	Hungary; Éva Risztov; Márk Papp; Dániel Székelyi
2018 Glasgow	Netherlands; Esmee Vermeulen; Sharon van Rouwendaal; Pepijn Smits; Ferry Weertman	Germany; Leonie Beck; Sarah Köhler; Sören Meißner; Florian Wellbrock	France; Lara Grangeon; David Aubry; Lisa Pou; Marc-Antoine Olivier
2020 Budapest	Italy; Rachele Bruni; Giulia Gabbrielleschi; Gregorio Paltrinieri; Domenico Acerenza	Germany; Lea Boy; Leonie Beck; Rob Muffels; Florian Wellbrock	Hungary; Réka Rohács; Anna Olasz; Dávid Betlehem; Kristóf Rasovszky
2022 Rome	Italy; Rachele Bruni; Ginevra Taddeucci; Gregorio Paltrinieri; Domenico Acerenza	Hungary; Réka Rohács; Anna Olasz; Dávid Betlehem; Kristóf Rasovszky	France; Madelon Catteau; Aurélie Muller; Axel Reymond; Logan Fontaine

== See also ==
- European Open Water Swimming Championships
- List of European Aquatics Championships medalists in open water swimming
- List of World Aquatics Championships medalists in open water swimming
