= Marathon swimming at the 2012 Summer Olympics – Qualification =

For the marathon swimming competitions at the 2012 Summer Olympics the following qualification systems were in place.

== Qualifying standards ==
A National Olympic Committee (NOC) may enter up to 2 qualified athletes in each individual event if both meet the Olympic Qualifying Time (OQT). 1 athlete per event can potentially qualify should they meet the Olympic Selection Time (OST) and if the quota of athletes has not been met. NOCs may enter swimmers regardless of time (1 swimmer per sex) if they have no swimmers meeting either standard entry time.

The qualifying time standards must be obtained in Continental Championships, National Olympic Trials or International Competitions approved by FINA in the period 1 March 2011 to 3 July 2012.

=== Men's 10 km marathon ===
| Qualification event | Qualified athletes |
|---|---|
| Host* | Daniel Fogg (GBR) |
| 2011 World Championships | Spyridon Gianniotis (GRE); Thomas Lurz (GER); Sergey Bolshakov (RUS); Alex Meyer (USA); Ky Hurst (AUS); Francisco Jose Hervas Jódar (ESP); Brian Ryckeman (BEL); Julien Sauvage (FRA); Vladimir Dyatchin (RUS); Andreas Waschburger (GER) |
| 2012 Olympic Marathon Swim Qualifier (9–10 June 2012) | Oussama Mellouli (TUN); Richard Weinberger (CAN); Petar Stoychev (BUL); Valerio Cleri (ITA); Troyden Prinsloo (RSA); Yasunari Hirai (JPN); Igor Chervynskiy (UKR); Ivan Enderica Ochoa (ECU); Arseniy Lavrentyev (POR) |
| Continent qualifiers | Yuriy Kudinov (KAZ); Erwin Maldonado (VEN); Csaba Gercsák (HUN); Benjamin Schulte (GUM); Mazen Metwaly (EGY) |

=== Women's 10 km marathon ===
| Qualification event | Qualified athletes |
|---|---|
| 2011 World Championships | Keri-anne Payne (GBR); Martina Grimaldi (ITA); Marianna Lymperta (GRE); Melissa Gorman (AUS); Cecilia Biagioli (ARG); Poliana Okimoto (BRA); Jana Pechanová (CZE); Angela Maurer (GER); Swann Oberson (SUI); Erika Villaécija (ESP) |
| 2012 Olympic Marathon Swim Qualifier (9–10 June 2012) | Haley Anderson (USA); Éva Risztov (HUN); Fang Yanqiao (CHN); Zsofia Balazs (CAN); Ophélie Aspord (FRA); Natalia Charlos (POL); Anna Guseva (RUS); Karla Šitić (CRO); Natasha Tang (HKG); Yumi Kida (JPN); Lizeth Rueda (MEX) |
| Continent qualifiers | Olga Beresnyeva (UKR); Yanel Pinto (VEN); Heidi Gan (MAS); Jessica Roux (RSA) |

- * If not qualified by any means. If Great Britain has already qualified quota will be added to the 2012 Olympic Marathon Swim Qualifier.
