= 2012 European Open Water Swimming Championships =

Water sport competitions

- Host city: Piombino
- Country: Italy
- Events: 7
- Opening: 12 September 2012
- Closing: 16 September 2012

The 2012 European Open Water Swimming Championships was the fourteenth edition of the European Open Water Swimming Championships (but the sixth stand alone after 1989, 1991, 1993, 2008 and 2011 editions) and took part from 12 to 16 September 2012 in Piombino, Italy.

== Results ==
=== Men ===
Event	Gold	Silver	Bronze
5 km (15.09)	Kirill Abrosimov; Russia; 54:47,1	Andreas Waschburger; Germany; 54:59,4	Luca Ferretti; Italy; 55:06,6
10 km (12.09)	Kirill Abrosimov; Russia; 1:57:46,8	Andreas Waschburger; Germany; 1:57:48,2	Nicola Bolzonello; Italy; 1:57:54,0
25 km (16.09)	Petar Stoichev; Bulgaria; 5:04:02,3	Arseni Lavrantiev; Portugal; 5:04:05,4	Axel Reymond; France; 5:04:06,3

=== Women ===
Event	Gold	Silver	Bronze
5 km (15.09)	Rachele Bruni; Italy; 1:00:56,9	Kaliopi Araúzu; Greece; 1:01:53,5	Jana Pechanová; Czech Republic; 1:01:57,8
10 km (12.09)	Martina Grimaldi; Italy; 2:12:23,3	Angela Maurer; Germany; 2:12:24,7	Jana Pechanová; Czech Republic; 2:12:26,1
25 km (16.09)	Alice Franco; Italy; 5:31:21,9	Margarita Domínguez; Spain; 5:31:26,3	Martina Grimaldi; Italy; 5:31:34,6

=== Mixed ===
Event	Gold	Silver	Bronze
5 km por equipos (13.09)	Italy; Luca Ferretti; Simone Ercoli; Rachele Bruni; 59:04,2	Greece; Marios Kalafatis; Yeoryos Arniakos; Kalliopi Araouzou; 59:57,1	Germany; Thomas Lurz; Andreas Waschburger; Angela Maurer; 1:00:42,5

== Medal table ==
Rank	Nation	Gold	Silver	Bronze	Total
1	Italy (ITA)	4	0	3	7
2	Russia (RUS)	2	0	0	2
3	Bulgaria (BUL)	1	0	0	1
4	Germany (GER)	0	3	1	4
5	Greece (GRE)	0	2	0	2
6	Portugal (POR)	0	1	0	1
6	Spain (ESP)	0	1	0	1
8	Czech Republic (CZE)	0	0	2	2
9	France (FRA)	0	0	1	1
Totals (9 entries)		7	7	7	21

== See also ==
- 2012 European Junior Open Water Swimming Championships
- 2012 European Aquatics Championships
- List of medalists at the European Open Water Swimming Championships
