= 2010 European Open Water Swimming Championships =

Water sport competitions

- Host city: Budapest
- Country: Hungary
- Events: 7
- Opening: 4 August 2010
- Closing: 15 August 2010

The 2010 European Open Water Swimming Championships was the 12th edition of the European Open Water Swimming Championships (was part of the 2010 European Aquatics Championships) and took part from 4–15 August 2010 in Budapest, Hungary.

== Results ==
=== Men ===
Event	Gold		Silver		Bronze	
5 km	Luca Ferretti; Italy	58:43.4	Simone Ercoli; Italy	59:00.5	Simone Ruffini; Italy; Spyridon Gianniotis; Greece	59:15.1
10 km	Thomas Lurz; Germany	1:54:22.5	Valerio Cleri; Italy	1:54:25.8	Evgeny Drattsev; Russia	1:54:26.6
25 km	Valerio Cleri; Italy	5:16:38.3	Bertrand Venturi; France	5:16:54.7	Joanes Hedel; France	5:18:57.6

=== Women ===
Event	Gold		Silver		Bronze	
5 km	Ekaterina Seliverstova; Russia	1:02:34.7	Kalliopi Araouzou; Greece	1:02:37.3	Marianna Lymperta; Greece	1:02:41.3
10 km	Linsy Heister; Netherlands	2:01:06.7	Giorgia Consiglio; Italy	2:01:07.6	Angela Maurer; Germany	2:01:08.2
25 km	Olga Beresnyeva; Ukraine	5:48:10.2	Angela Maurer; Germany	5:48:10.3	Martina Grimaldi; Italy	5:48:30.8

=== Mixed events ===
Event	Gold		Silver		Bronze	
5 km Team Event	Kalliopi Araouzou; Antonios Fokaidis; Spyridon Gianniotis; Greece	59:03	Rachele Bruni; Simone Ercoli; Simone Ruffini; Italy	59:55.6	Sergey Bolshakov; Anna Guseva; Daniil Serebrennikov; Russia	59:59.5

== Medal table ==
Rank	Nation	Gold	Silver	Bronze	Total
1	Italy (ITA)	2	4	2	8
2	Greece (GRE)	1	1	2	4
3	Germany (GER)	1	1	1	3
4	Russia (RUS)	1	0	2	3
5	Netherlands (NED)	1	0	0	1
5	Ukraine (UKR)	1	0	0	1
7	France (FRA)	0	1	1	2
Totals (7 entries)		7	7	8	22

== See also ==
- 2010 European Aquatics Championships
- List of medalists at the European Open Water Swimming Championships
