= 2006 European Open Water Swimming Championships =

Water sport competitions

- Host city: Budapest
- Country: Hungary
- Events: 6
- Opening: 26 July 2006
- Closing: 30 July 2006

The 2006 European Open Water Swimming Championships was the 10th edition of the European Open Water Swimming Championships (was part of the 2006 European Aquatics Championships) and took part from 26–30 July 2006 in Budapest, Hungary.

== Results ==
=== Men ===
Event	Gold		Silver		Bronze	
5 km	Thomas Lurz; Germany	56:00.1	Christian Hein; Germany	56:01.1	Simone Ercoli; Italy	56:01.8
10 km	Thomas Lurz; Germany	1:58:12.1	Maarten van der Weijden; Netherlands	1:58:13.5	Christian Hein; Germany	1:58:16.6
25 km	Gilles Rondy; France	5:10:17.3	Anton Sanachev; Russia	5:10:18.2	Stéphane Gomez; France	5:10:19.3

=== Women ===
Event	Gold		Silver		Bronze	
5 km	Ekaterina Seliverstova; Russia	1:01:50.8	Cathi Dietrich; France	1:01:52.3	Jana Pechanová; Czech Republic; Larisa Ilchenko; Russia	1:01:52.4
10 km	Angela Maurer; Germany	2:07:10.8	Rita Kovács; Hungary	2:07:14.3	Jana Pechanová; Czech Republic	2:07:15.6
25 km	Angela Maurer; Germany	5:35:19.1	Natalia Pankina; Russia	5:35:25.1	Stefanie Biller; Germany	5:35:29.5

== Medal table ==
Rank	Nation	Gold	Silver	Bronze	Total
1	Germany (GER)	4	1	2	7
2	Russia (RUS)	1	2	1	4
3	France (FRA)	1	1	1	3
4	Hungary (HUN)	0	1	0	1
4	Netherlands (NED)	0	1	0	1
6	Czech Republic (CZE)	0	0	2	2
7	Italy (ITA)	0	0	1	1
Totals (7 entries)		6	6	7	19

== See also ==
- 2006 European Aquatics Championships
- List of medalists at the European Open Water Swimming Championships
