= 1991 European Open Water Swimming Championships =

Water sport competitions

- Host city: Terracina
- Country: Italy
- Events: 4
- Opening: 14 September 1991
- Closing: 15 September 1991

The 1991 European Open Water Swimming Championships was the second edition of the European Open Water Swimming Championships and took part from 14 to 15 September 1991 in Terracina, Italy.

== Results ==
=== Men ===
Event	Gold	Silver	Bronze
5 km	Stefano Rubaudo; Italy; 1:06:51,7	Davide Giacchino; Italy; 1:07:22,3	Hans van Goor; Netherlands; 1:07:38,4
25 km	Christof Wandratsch; Germany; 5:46:26,2	Sergio Chiarandini; Italy; 5:56:50,2	Urs Kohlhaas; Switzerland; 5:58:50,1

=== Women ===
Event	Gold	Silver	Bronze
5 km	Bea Berzlánovits; Hungary; 1:13:51,2	Yvetta Hlaváčová; Czechoslovakia; 1:14:13,4	Mara Data; Italy; 1:14:13,7
25 km	Eliane Fieschi; Switzerland; 6:38:58,8	Samantha Cavadini; Switzerland; 6:54:27,7	Rita Kovács; Hungary; 6:57:29,5

== Medal table ==
Rank	Nation	Gold	Silver	Bronze	Total
1	Italy (ITA)	1	2	1	4
2	Switzerland (SUI)	1	1	1	3
3	Hungary (HUN)	1	0	1	2
4	Germany (GER)	1	0	0	1
5	Czechoslovakia (TCH)	0	1	0	1
6	Netherlands (NED)	0	0	1	1
Totals (6 entries)		4	4	4	12

== See also ==
- List of medalists at the European Open Water Swimming Championships
