= 1995 European Open Water Swimming Championships =

Water sport competitions

- Host city: Vienna
- Country: Austria
- Events: 4
- Opening: 22 August 1995
- Closing: 27 August 1995

The 1995 European Open Water Swimming Championships was the fourth edition of the European Open Water Swimming Championships (the first that was part of the 1995 European Aquatics Championships) and took part from 22–27 August 1995 in Vienna, Austria.

== Results ==
=== Men ===
| Event | Gold | Silver | Bronze |
|---|---|---|---|
| 5 km | Aleksey Akatyev (RUS) | Christof Wandratsch (GER) | Samuele Pampana (ITA) |
| 25 km | Christof Wandratsch (GER) | Aleksey Akatyev (RUS) | Stéphane Lecat (FRA) |

=== Women ===
| Event | Gold | Silver | Bronze |
|---|---|---|---|
| 5 km | Rita Kovács (HUN) | Peggy Büchse (GER) | Valeria Casprini (ITA) |
| 25 km | Peggy Büchse (GER) | Edith van Dijk (NED) | Yvetta Hlaváčová (CZE) |

== Medal table ==
| Rank | Nation | Gold | Silver | Bronze | Total |
|---|---|---|---|---|---|
| 1 | Germany (GER) | 2 | 2 | 0 | 4 |
| 2 | Russia (RUS) | 1 | 1 | 0 | 2 |
| 3 | Hungary (HUN) | 1 | 0 | 0 | 1 |
| 4 | Netherlands (NED) | 0 | 1 | 0 | 1 |
| 5 | Italy (ITA) | 0 | 0 | 2 | 2 |
| 6 | Czech Republic (CZE) | 0 | 0 | 1 | 1 |
| 6 | France (FRA) | 0 | 0 | 1 | 1 |
| Totals (7 entries) | | 4 | 4 | 4 | 12 |

== See also ==
- 1995 European Aquatics Championships
- List of medalists at the European Open Water Swimming Championships
