= 2011 European Open Water Swimming Championships =

Water sport competitions

- Host city: Eilat
- Country: Israel
- Events: 7
- Opening: 6 September 2011
- Closing: 11 September 2011

The 2011 European Open Water Swimming Championships was the 13th edition of the European Open Water Swimming Championships (but the 5th stand alone after 1989, 1991, 1993, and 2008 editions) and took part from 6–11 September 2011 in Eilat, Israel.

== Results ==
=== Men ===
Event	Gold	Silver	Bronze
5 km (10.09)	Simone Ercoli; Italy; 53:34,9	Jan Wolfgarten; Germany; 53:39,0	Michael Dmitriev; Israel; 54:03,5
10 km (07.09)	Thomas Lurz; Germany; 1:53:18,2	Vladimir Dyatchin; Russia; 1:53:20,0	Ihor Snitko; Ukraine; 1:53:21,5
25 km (11.09)	Brian Ryckeman; Belgium; 5:05:02,2	Petar Stoichev; Bulgaria; 5:05:06,6	Joanes Hedel; France; 5:05:18,3

=== Women ===
Event	Gold	Silver	Bronze
5 km (10.09)	Rachele Bruni; Italy; 55:51,0	Jana Pechanová; Czech Republic; 57:06,0	Coralie Codevelle; France; 57:16,7
10 km (07.09)	Martina Grimaldi; Italy; 2:00:18,6	Rachele Bruni; Italy; 2:00:19,2	Nadine Reichert; Germany; 2:00:20,0
25 km (11.09)	Alice Franco; Italy; 5:26:23,6	Margarita Domínguez; Spain; 5:26:42,7	Jana Pechanová; Czech Republic; 5:26:44,2

=== Mixed ===
Event	Gold	Silver	Bronze
5 km por equipos (08.09)	Italy; Simone Ercoli; Luca Ferretti; Rachele Bruni; 56:12,4	Germany; Hendrik Rijkens; Rob Muffels; Svenja Zihsler; 57:15,2	France; Sébastien Fraysse; Damien Cattin-Vidal; Coralie Codevelle; 57:41,1

== Medal table ==
Rank	Nation	Gold	Silver	Bronze	Total
1	Italy (ITA)	5	1	0	6
2	Germany (GER)	1	2	1	4
3	Belgium (BEL)	1	0	0	1
4	Czech Republic (CZE)	0	1	1	2
5	Bulgaria (BUL)	0	1	0	1
5	Russia (RUS)	0	1	0	1
5	Spain (ESP)	0	1	0	1
8	France (FRA)	0	0	3	3
9	Israel (ISR)	0	0	1	1
9	Ukraine (UKR)	0	0	1	1
Totals (10 entries)		7	7	7	21

== See also ==
- 2011 European Aquatics Championships
- List of medalists at the European Open Water Swimming Championships
