= 2016 European Open Water Swimming Championships =

Water sport competitions

2016 European Open Water Championships
- Host city: Hoorn
- Country: Netherlands
- Events: 7
- Opening: 14 July 2016
- Closing: 14 July 2016

The 2016 European Open Water Championships took place from 10 to 14 July 2016 in Hoorn (Netherlands), organized by European Swimming Federation LEN.

== Medal table ==
Medal table(final score after 7 events)
Rank	Nation	G	S	B	Total
1	Italy	3	2	2	7
2	France	2	0	2	4
3	United Kingdom	1	1	1	3
4	Russia	1	1	0	2
5	Netherlands	1	0	1	2
6	Germany	0	2	0	2
7	Hungary	0	0	1	1
Total		8	6	7	21

== Prize money ==
LEN awarded best 3 swimmers each race following pricemoney:

	Gold	Silver	Bronze
Individual (5/10/25 km)	€2,000	€1,500	€1,000
Team Event (5 km)	€3,000	€2,500	€2,000

== Trophy ==
Best Swimmers 2 swimmers each nation each event got points for championships trophy. It was awarded to the nation with the highest number of points, according to

Place:	1	2	3	4	5	6	7	8	9	10	11	12	13	14	15	16	all other
Points:	20	17	15	14	13	12	11	10	9	8	7	6	5	4	3	2	each 1

Championships Trophy (after 7 events)
Rank	Nation	Men	Women	mixed	Total
1	Italy	54	62	86	202
2	Germany	35	40	41	116
3	Netherlands	49	29	23	101
4	Russia	44	20	30	94
5	United Kingdom	48	31	14	93
6	France	15	20	47	82
7	Hungary	33	15	24	72
8	Portugal	6	25	22	53
9	Czech Republic	4	12	22	38
10	Greece	13	20	0	33
11	Poland	1	16	11	28
12	Spain	7	16	0	23
13	Israel	2	0	14	16
14	Macedonia	0	0	11	11
15	Slovenia	0	9	0	9
16	Austria	5	0	0	5
17	Ireland	4	0	0	4
17	Ukraine	2	2	0	4
19	Serbia	3	0	0	3
20	Belgium	1	0	0	1
20	Sweden	0	1	0	1

== Results women ==
=== 5 kilometer ===
Rank	Name	Nation	Result (h)
1	Danielle Huskisson	United Kingdom	0:59:46.1
2	Finnia Wunram	Germany	0:59:52.4
3	Sharon van Rouwendaal	Netherlands	0:59:54.9
4	Aurora Ponsele	Italy	1:00:11.8
5	Giulia Gabbrielleschi	Italy	1:00:38.6
6	Ilaria Raimondi	Italy	1:00:43.4
7	Erika Villaecija	Spain	1:00:57.6
8	Svenja Zihsler	Germany	1:00:59.6

Date: 12 July 2016

=== 10 kilometer ===
Rank	Name	Nation	Result(h)
1	Rachele Bruni	Italy	2:07:00.1
1	Aurelie Muller	France	2:07:00.1
3	Arianna Bridi	Italy	2:07:03.6
4	Sharon van Rouwendaal	Netherlands	2:07:06.8
5	Angelica Andre	Portugal	2:07:11.3
6	Finnia Wunram	Germany	2:07:11.6
7	Giulia Gabbrielleschi	Italy	2:07:12.8
8	Danielle Huskisson	United Kingdom	2:07:13.7

Date: 10 July 2016

=== 25 kilometer ===
Rank	Name	Nation	Result (h)
1	Martina Grimaldi	Italy	5:26:47.8
2	Olga Kozydub	Russia	5:26:49.8
3	Caroline Jouisse	France	5:26:50.5
4	Arianna Bridi	Italy	5:26:57.3
5	Angela Maurer	Germany	5:26:57.6
6	Morgane Dornic	France	5:30:18.2
7	Barbara Pozzobon	Italy	5:30:24.4
8	Sarah Bosslet	Germany	5:34:27.7

Date: 14 July 2016

== Results men ==
=== 5 kilometer ===
Rank	Name	Nation	Result (min)
1	Kirill Abrosimov	Russia	54:34.3
2	Federico Vanelli	Italy	54:54.4
3	Caleb Hughes	United Kingdom	55:06.1
4	Rob Muffels	Germany	55:11.3
5	Ferry Weertman	Netherlands	55:14.8
6	Mario Sanzullo	Italy	55:22.2
7	Daniel Szekelyi	Hungary	55:46.8
8	Sören Meißner	Germany	55:52.1

Date: 12 July 2016

=== 10 kilometer ===
Rank	Name	Nation	Result (h)
1	Fery Weertman	Netherlands	1:55:20.6
2	Jack Burnell	United Kingdom	1:55:21.2
3	Marc-Antoine Olivier	France	1:55:21.6
4	Federico Vanelli	Italy	1:55:24.3
5	Spyridon Gianniotis	Greece	1:55:25.0
6	Caleb Hughes	United Kingdom	1:55:25.0
7	Simone Ruffini	Italy	1:55:25.4
8	Anton Evsikov	Russia	1:55:25.8

Date: 10 July 2016

=== 25 kilometer ===
Rank	Name	Nation	Result (h)
1	Axel Reymond	France	5:02:22.0
2	Matteo Furlan	Italy	5:06:07.5
3	Edoardo Stochino	Italy	5:09:19.4
4	Yuval Safra	Israel	5:11:32.9
5	Marcel Schouten	Netherlands	5:11:52.0
6	Andrea Bianchi	Italy	5:13:58.9
7	Matej Kozubek	Czech Republic	5:14:19.7
8	Evgenij Pop Acev	Macedonia	5:23:10.6

Date: 14 July 2016

== Results team event ==
=== 5 kilometer ===
Rank	Name	Nation	Result (h)
1	Rachele Bruni; Simone Ruffini; Federico Vanelli	Italy	0:55:59.3
2	Finnia Wunram; Rob Muffels; Andreas Waschburger	Germany	0:56:37.0
3	Éva Risztov; Márk Papp; Dániel Székelyi	Hungary	0:56:42.6
4	Danielle Huskisson; Caleb Hughes; Jay Lelliott	United Kingdom	0:57:03.5
5	Daria Kulik; Anton Evsikov; Sergey Bolshakov	Russia	0:58:19.2
6	Angelica Andre; Mario Bonanca; Rafael Gil	Portugal	1:00:14.9
7	Justyna Burska; Krzysztof Pielowski; Jan Urbaniak	Poland	1:00:19.3
8	Esmee Bos; Lucas Greven; Pepijn Smits	Netherlands	1:02:42.9

Date: 13 July 2016
