= 2014 European Open Water Swimming Championships =

Water sport competitions

- Host city: Berlin
- Country: Germany
- Events: 7
- Opening: 13 August 2014
- Closing: 17 August 2014

The 2014 European Open Water Swimming Championships was the fifteenth edition of the European Open Water Swimming Championships (was part of the 2014 European Aquatics Championships) and took part from 13–17 August 2014 in Berlin, Germany.

== Results ==
=== Men ===
Event	Gold		Silver		Bronze	
5 km	Daniel Fogg; Great Britain	53:41.4	Rob Muffels; Germany	54:01.8	Thomas Lurz; Germany	54:02.6
10 km	Ferry Weertman; Netherlands	1:49:56.2	Thomas Lurz; Germany	1:49:59.0	Evgeny Drattsev; Russia	1:50:00.6
25 km	Axel Reymond; France	4:59:18.8	Evgeny Drattsev; Russia	4:59:31.2	Edoardo Stochino; Italy	5:08:51.0

=== Women ===
Event	Gold		Silver		Bronze	
5 km	Isabelle Härle; Germany	57:55.7	Sharon van Rouwendaal; Netherlands	58:29.9	Mireia Belmonte; Spain	58:41.4
10 km	Sharon van Rouwendaal; Netherlands	1:56:06.9	Éva Risztov; Hungary	1:56:08.0	Aurora Ponselè; Italy	1:56:08.5
25 km	Martina Grimaldi; Italy	5:19:14.1	Anna Olasz; Hungary	5:19:21.0	Angela Maurer; Germany	5:19:21.4

=== Team event ===
Event	Gold		Silver		Bronze	
Team	Netherlands; Ferry Weertman; Marcel Schouten; Sharon van Rouwendaal	55:47.8	Greece; Spyridon Gianniotis; Antonios Fokaidis; Kalliopi Araouzou	56:05.5	Germany; Rob Muffels; Thomas Lurz; Isabelle Härle	56:14.8

== See also ==
- 2014 European Aquatics Championships
- List of medalists at the European Open Water Swimming Championships
