= 2008 European Open Water Swimming Championships =

Water sport competitions

- Host city: Dubrovnik
- Country: Croatia
- Events: 7
- Opening: 8 September 2008
- Closing: 14 September 2008

The 2008 European Open Water Swimming Championships was the 11th edition of the European Open Water Swimming Championships (but the 4th stand alone after 1989, 1991 and 1993 editions) and took part from 8–14 September 2008 in Dubrovnik, Croatia.

== Results ==
=== Men ===
Event	Gold	Silver	Bronze
5 km (10.09)	Spyridon Yannotis; Greece; 52:57,2	Jan Wolfgarten; Germany; 53:55,7	Thomas Lurz; Germany; 54:04,3
10 km (09.09)	Thomas Lurz; Germany; 1:52:48,9	Yevgueni Drattsev; Russia; 1:52:50,6	Toni Franz; Germany; 1:52:53,0
25 km (13.09)	Valerio Cleri; Italy; 4:29:00,0	Joanes Hedel; France; 4:32:40,9	Dmitri Soloviov; Russia; 4:34:02,4

=== Women ===
Event	Gold	Silver	Bronze
5 km (09.09)	Rachele Bruni; Italy; 58:50,7	Britta Kamrau; Germany; 59:16,1	Alice Franco; Italy; 59:39,0
10 km (10.09)	Larisa Ilchenko; Russia; 2:00:30,9	Martina Grimaldi; Italy; 2:00:31,4	Alice Franco; Italy; 2:00:32,2
25 km (14.09)	Margarita Domínguez; Spain; 5:38:35,3	Britta Kamrau; Germany; 5:39:00,2	Anna Uvarova; Russia; 5:39:06,6

=== Mixed ===
Event	Gold	Silver	Bronze
5 km por equipos (11.09)	Italy; Andrea Volpini; Rachele Bruni; Luca Ferretti; 56:17,5	Russia; Daniil Serebrennikov; Yevgueni Drattsev; Yekaterina Seliverstova; 57:03,6	Germany; Jan Wolfgarten; Britta Kamrau; Thomas Lurz; 57:30,0

== Medal table ==
Rank	Nation	Gold	Silver	Bronze	Total
1	Italy (ITA)	3	1	2	6
2	Germany (GER)	1	3	3	7
3	Russia (RUS)	1	2	2	5
4	Greece (GRE)	1	0	0	1
4	Spain (ESP)	1	0	0	1
6	France (FRA)	0	1	0	1
Totals (6 entries)		7	7	7	21

== See also ==
- 2008 European Aquatics Championships
- List of medalists at the European Open Water Swimming Championships
