= 1989 European Open Water Swimming Championships =

Water sport competitions

- Host city: Stari Grad
- Country: Yugoslavia
- Events: 4
- Opening: 2 September 1989
- Closing: 3 September 1989

The 1989 European Open Water Swimming Championships was the first edition of the European Open Water Swimming Championships and took part from 2–3 September 1989 in Stari Grad, Yugoslavia.

== Results ==
=== Men ===
Event	Gold	Silver	Bronze
5 km	Igor Majcen; Yugoslavia; 1:09:25	Jaromír Henyš; Czechoslovakia; 1:10:08	Arthur de Rouw; Netherlands; 1:10:33
21 km	Nace Majcen; Yugoslavia; 4:52:04	Michal Špaček; Czechoslovakia; 4:57:23	Dragan Kvrgić; Yugoslavia; 4:59:27

=== Women ===
Event	Gold	Silver	Bronze
5 km	Anamarija Petričević; Yugoslavia; 1:16:15	Wandy Kater; Netherlands; 1:20:10	Tanja Godina; Yugoslavia; 1:20:12
21 km	Rita Lazar; Hungary; 5:27:07	Diana Simonović; Yugoslavia; 5:31:35	Annemie Landmeters; Belgium; 5:37:57

== Medal table ==
Rank	Nation	Gold	Silver	Bronze	Total
1	Yugoslavia (YUG)	3	1	2	6
2	Hungary (HUN)	1	0	0	1
3	Czechoslovakia (TCH)	0	2	0	2
4	Netherlands (NED)	0	1	1	2
5	Belgium (BEL)	0	0	1	1
Totals (5 entries)		4	4	4	12

== See also ==
- List of medalists at the European Open Water Swimming Championships
