= 1997 European Open Water Swimming Championships =

Water sport competitions

- Host city: Sevilla
- Country: Spain
- Events: 4
- Opening: 19 August 1997
- Closing: 24 August 1997

The 1997 European Open Water Swimming Championships was the fifth edition of the European Open Water Swimming Championships (was part of the 1997 European Aquatics Championships) and took part from 19–24 August 1997 in Sevilla, Spain.

== Results ==
=== Men ===
Event	Gold	Silver	Bronze
5 km open water	Aleksey Akatyev (RUS)	Yevgeny Bezruchenko (RUS)	Luca Baldini (ITA)
25 km open water	Aleksey Akatyev (RUS)	Christof Wandratsch (GER); Stéphane Lecat (FRA)	

=== Women ===
Event	Gold	Silver	Bronze
5 km open water	Peggy Büchse (GER)	Valeria Casprini (ITA)	Rita Kovács (HUN)
25 km open water	Rita Kovács (HUN)	Valeria Casprini (ITA)	Edith van Dijk (NED)

== Medal table ==
Rank	Nation	Gold	Silver	Bronze	Total
1	Russia (RUS)	2	1	0	3
2	Germany (GER)	1	1	0	2
3	Hungary (HUN)	1	0	1	2
4	Italy (ITA)	0	2	1	3
5	France (FRA)	0	1	0	1
6	Netherlands (NED)	0	0	1	1
Totals (6 entries)		4	5	3	12

== See also ==
- 1997 European Aquatics Championships
- List of medalists at the European Open Water Swimming Championships
