= Marathon swimming at the 2008 Summer Olympics – Men's 10 kilometre =

Men's 10 km open water marathon at the Games of the XXIX Olympiad
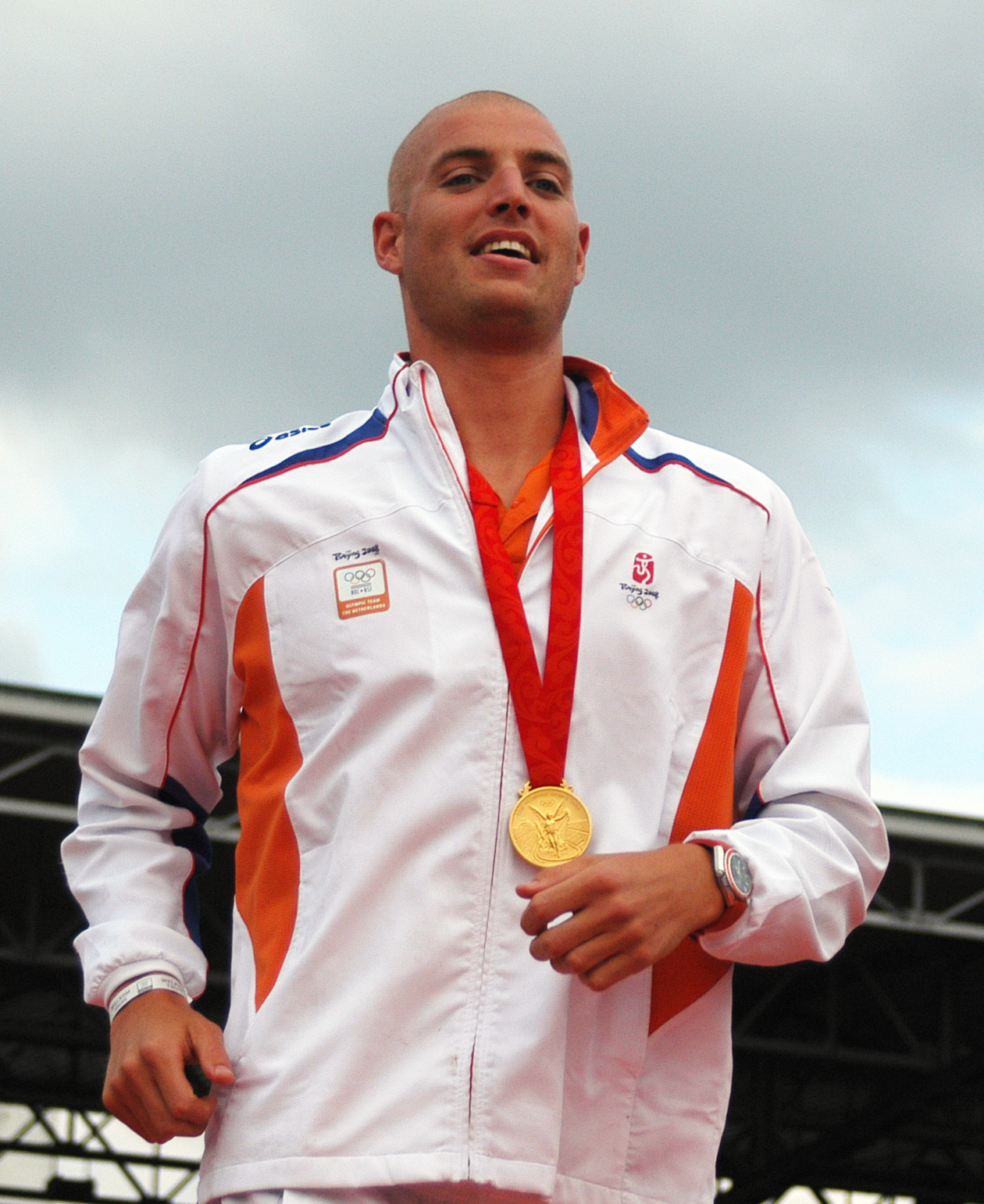
- Gold medal winner Maarten van der Weijden.
- Venue: Shunyi Olympic Rowing-Canoeing Park
- Date: August 21, 2008
- Competitors: 25 from 24 nations
- Winning time: 1:51:51.6

Medalists
1st place, gold medalist(s)		Maarten van der Weijden	Netherlands
2nd place, silver medalist(s)		David Davies	Great Britain
3rd place, bronze medalist(s)		Thomas Lurz	Germany

The men's marathon 10 kilometre event at the 2008 Olympic Games took place on 21 August at the Shunyi Olympic Rowing-Canoeing Park in Beijing, China.

Dutch swimmer and cancer survivor Maarten van der Weijden enjoyed the race of his life as he sprinted in a three-way battle against Great Britain's David Davies and Germany's Thomas Lurz to a spectacular finish under a scorching rain, and most importantly, to claim the Olympic title in the inaugural men's open water marathon. With only a few hundred metres left, he pulled ahead from the rest of the field before slapping the yellow pads first in 1:51:51.6. Van der Weijden was diagnosed with leukemia in 2001; however, with the aid of a stem cell treatment, he came back stronger from a two-year ordeal to resume his swimming career.

Leading almost the entire race by over six body lengths, Davies drifted offline at the final stages, and eventually missed out the title by 1.5 seconds with the silver-medal time in 1:51:53.1. Meanwhile, Lurz held off the final pack to claim the bronze in 1:51:53.6, finishing exactly two seconds behind Van der Weijden.

Farther from the trio, Italy's Valerio Cleri finished off the podium with a fourth-place time in 1:52:07.5, and was followed in fifth by Russia's Evgeny Drattsev at 1:52:08.9. Bulgaria's Petar Stoychev, the English Channel record holder, trailed behind his Russian rival in a sprint challenge by two-tenths of a second (0.20), earning a sixth spot in 1:52:09.1. Belgium's Brian Ryckeman (1:52:10.7) and U.S. swimmer Mark Warkentin (1:52:13.0) managed to pull off from the rest of the field with a top-eight finish.

Russia's pre-Olympic favorite and world champion Vladimir Dyatchin was disqualified from the race after he received a pair of yellow cards for obstructing his fellow swimmers and a red card for misconduct.

== Qualification ==
The men's 10 km races at the 2008 Olympics featured a field of twenty-five swimmers:

- 10: the top-10 finishers in the 10 km races at the 2008 FINA World Championships in Seville, Spain.
- 9: the top-9 finishers at the Good Luck Beijing Olympic 10K Marathon Test Event (31 May–1 June 2008 in Beijing, China).
- 5: one representative from each FINA continent (Africa, Americas, Asia, Europe and Oceania). (These were selected based on the finishes at the World Championships.)
- 1: from the host nation (China) if not qualified by other means.

== Competition format ==
Unlike all of the other swimming events in the pool, the men's and women's marathon 10 kilometre races were held in open water. No preliminary heats were held, with only the single mass-start race being contested. This race is held using freestyle swimming, with a lack of stroke regulations. For most of the event swimmers use the front crawl, but modifications are used situationally, especially when swimmers reach feeding stations.

Open water swimming events require different tactics and showcase several different racing strategies that are more common to competitive cycling, marathon running and water polo than traditional pool swimming. It is one of the few Olympic sports where the athlete's coaches play a critical role during the actual event. The coaches have four opportunities to provide drinks to their athletes as the athletes swim by floating pontoons in the course. If the coach falls in the water, his or her athlete is immediately disqualified.

== Results ==
Rank	Athlete	Nation	Time	Time behind	Notes
1st place, gold medalist(s)	Maarten van der Weijden	Netherlands	1:51:51.6		
2nd place, silver medalist(s)	David Davies	Great Britain	1:51:53.1	1.5	
3rd place, bronze medalist(s)	Thomas Lurz	Germany	1:51:53.6	2.0	
4	Valerio Cleri	Italy	1:52:07.5	15.9	
5	Evgeny Drattsev	Russia	1:52:08.9	17.3	
6	Petar Stoychev	Bulgaria	1:52:09.1	17.5	
7	Brian Ryckeman	Belgium	1:52:10.7	19.1	
8	Mark Warkentin	United States	1:52:13.0	21.4	
9	Chad Ho	South Africa	1:52:13.1	21.5	
10	Erwin Maldonado	Venezuela	1:52:13.6	22.0	
11	Ky Hurst	Australia	1:52:13.7	22.1	
12	Igor Chervynskiy	Ukraine	1:52:14.7	23.1	
13	Francisco Jose Hervas	Spain	1:52:16.5	24.9	
14	Allan do Carmo	Brazil	1:52:16.6	25.0	
15	Gilles Rondy	France	1:52:16.7	25.1	
16	Spyridon Gianniotis	Greece	1:52:20.4	28.8	
17	Rostislav Vítek	Czech Republic	1:52:41.8	50.2	
18	Luis Escobar	Mexico	1:53:47.9	1:56.3	
19	Saleh Mohammad	Syria	1:54:37.7	2:46.1	
20	Mohamed Monir	Egypt	1:55:17.0	3:25.4	
21	Damián Blaum	Argentina	1:55:48.6	3:57.0	
22	Arseniy Lavrentyev	Portugal	2:03:39.6	11:48.0	
23	Xin Tong	China	2:09:13.4	17:21.8	
	Csaba Gercsák	Hungary	DNF		
	Vladimir Dyatchin	Russia	DSQ		
