= Open water swimming at the 2019 World Aquatics Championships – Mixed 5 km team relay =

Mixed 5 km team relay at the 2019 World Aquatics Championships
- Venue: Yeosu Expo Ocean Park
- Location: Yeosu, South Korea
- Dates: 18 July
- Competitors: 84 from 21 nations
- Teams: 21
- Winning time: 53:58.7

Medalists
| gold medal | Lea Boy; Sarah Köhler; Sören Meißner; Rob Muffels | Germany |
| silver medal | Rachele Bruni; Giulia Gabbrielleschi; Domenico Acerenza; Gregorio Paltrinieri | Italy |
| bronze medal | Haley Anderson; Jordan Wilimovsky; Ashley Twichell; Michael Brinegar | United States |

The mixed 5 km team relay at the 2019 World Aquatics Championships was held on 18 July 2019 in Expo Ocean Park bay, Yeosu, South Korea.

The United States was leading at halfway, before Germany overtook them to win gold with a time of 53:58.7, Italy won silver with 53:58.9, and the United States won bronze with 53:59.0.

== Race ==
The race took place at 08:00 on 18 July in Expo Ocean Park, Yeosu, South Korea. The water was choppy. Each team consisted of two men and two women swimming 1.25 km each, in any order, for a combined distance of 5 km. SwimSwam wrote that each team's choice for the order of their male and female swimmers was a "strategic" decision.

Germany and Italy both chose to allocate their two women to the first two legs, while the United States chose to order their relay as female, male, female, male. The individual 10 km champion Florian Wellbrock did not compete for the German team, in order to focus on the pool events he was competing in later in the Championships.

Tactical blocking and jostling occurred during the race, and Germany's Sarah Köhler was given a yellow card during the second leg; (Note: Dawn and SwimSwam both wrote that Lea Boy received the yellow card for Germany during the first leg.) a second yellow card would mean disqualification for the team.

The United States was leading at the halfway mark, while Germany was eighth, but Germany's two men took the lead over the last two legs, and Germany won gold with a time of 53:58.7. Italy finished 0.2 seconds behind to win silver with 53:58.9, and the United States won bronze with 53:59.0. Brazil finished fourth, and the defending champions, France, finished sixth.

Germany's win was their fourth medal in open water swimming at the Championships. World Aquatics called Gregorio Paltrinieri the "key ingredient" to Italy's silver. ESPN called it a "close finish".

Results
| Rank | Nation | Swimmers (Note: Ordered according to the order they swam in) | Time |
|---|---|---|---|
| 1st place, gold medalist(s) | Germany | Lea Boy; Sarah Köhler; Sören Meißner; Rob Muffels | 53:58.7 |
| 2nd place, silver medalist(s) | Italy | Rachele Bruni; Giulia Gabbrielleschi; Domenico Acerenza; Gregorio Paltrinieri | 53:58.9 |
| 3rd place, bronze medalist(s) | United States | Haley Anderson; Jordan Wilimovsky; Ashley Twichell; Michael Brinegar | 53:59.0 |
| 4 | Brazil | Ana Marcela Cunha; Viviane Jungblut; Diogo Villarinho; Fernando Ponte | 54:24.5 |
| 5 | Australia | Chelsea Gubecka; Hayden Cotter; Kareena Lee; Nicholas Sloman | 54:36.8 |
| 6 | France | Lara Grangeon; David Aubry; Aurélie Muller; Marc-Antoine Olivier | 54:37.1 |
| 7 | Netherlands | Esmee Vermeulen; Sharon van Rouwendaal; Pepijn Smits; Ferry Weertman | 54:37.2 |
| 8 | Hungary | Réka Rohács; Gergely Gyurta; Anna Olasz; Kristóf Rasovszky | 55:02.7 |
| 9 | China | Hou Yawen; Cheng Long; An Jiabao; Xin Xin | 55:14.8 |
| 10 | Russia | Anastasia Basalduk; Denis Adeev; Valeriia Ermakova; Kirill Abrosimov | 55:19.1 |
| 11 | Great Britain | Danielle Huskisson; Alice Dearing; Tobias Robinson; Jack Burnell | 55:31.1 |
| 12 | Spain | Paula Ruiz; Guillem Pujol; María de Valdés Álvarez; Raúl Santiago Betancor | 55:31.5 |
| 13 | Canada | Kate Sanderson; Hau-Li Fan; Chantel Jeffrey; Eric Hedlin | 56:20.3 |
| 14 | Japan | Yumi Kida; Takeshi Toyoda; Minami Niikura; Taiki Nonaka | 56:52.1 |
| 15 | South Africa | Michelle Weber; Danie Marais; Robyn Kinghorn; Chad Ho | 56:52.9 |
| 16 | Israel | Yonatan Rosin; Matan Roditi; Eva Fabian; Eden Girloanta | 57:24.5 |
| 17 | Mexico | Martha Aguilar; Daniel Delgadillo; Martha Sandoval; Arturo Pérez Vertti | 58:37.0 |
| 18 | South Korea | Ban Seon-jae; Park Seok-hyun; Jung Ha-eun; Jaehun Park | 58:59.0 |
| 19 | Venezuela | Liliana Hernández; Wilder Carreno; Paola Pérez; Diego Vera | 59:01.0 |
| 20 | Ecuador | David Farinango; Nataly Caldas Calle; Ana Abad; David Castro | 59:37.9 |
| 21 | Hong Kong | William Thorley; Keith Sin; Nip Tsz Yin; Wong Cho Ying | 1:00:37.9 |

Graph illustrating the race progression, based on split data in the Omega Timing results report.

== Further information ==
- Yoo-Rim, Kang (18 July 2019). "Germany wins mixed 5-kilometer relay in Yeosu". Korea JoongAng Daily. Archived from the original on 14 June 2025. – Some post-race quotes from the German swimmers
- Open Water Swimming - 5km Relay | Top Moments | FINA World Championships 2019 - Gwangju (Video). World Aquatics. 18 July 2019 – via YouTube. – Highlights video
- "Schwimm-WM in Südkorea: Freiwasser-Staffel Bejubelt Gold - Lurz: "Note 1 Mit Stern"". Die Zeit (in German). Deutsche Presse-Agentur. 18 July 2019. ISSN 0044-2070. Archived from the original on 23 October 2025. – Further information on the German team and their celebrations
- Qin, Wu (18 July 2019). "Highlights of Mixed 5km Team Open Water Swimming at FINA Worlds". Xinhuanet. Archived from the original on 13 August 2020. – Photo gallery from the event
- Schwenke, Sebastian (18 July 2019). "Mit Kampf Zu Gold: Deutsche Freiwasser-Staffel Holt Den WM-Titel". swimsportnews (in German). Archived from the original on 23 October 2025. – Further information on the German race
- "Mondiali Di Nuoto, Italia D'argento Nella Staffetta 5 Chilometri Mista" (in Italian). Tuttosport. 18 July 2019. Archived from the original on 19 July 2019. – Long quote from Paltrinieri after the race
