= 2018 European Open Water Swimming Championships =

Water sport competitions

- Host city: Glasgow
- Country: United Kingdom
- Events: 7
- Opening: 8 August 2018
- Closing: 12 August 2018

The 2018 European Open Water Swimming Championships was the 17th edition of the European Open Water Swimming Championships (was part of the 2018 European Aquatics Championships, in turn part of the 2018 European Championships) and took part from 8–12 August 2018 in Loch Lomond near Glasgow, United Kingdom.

== Results ==
=== Men ===
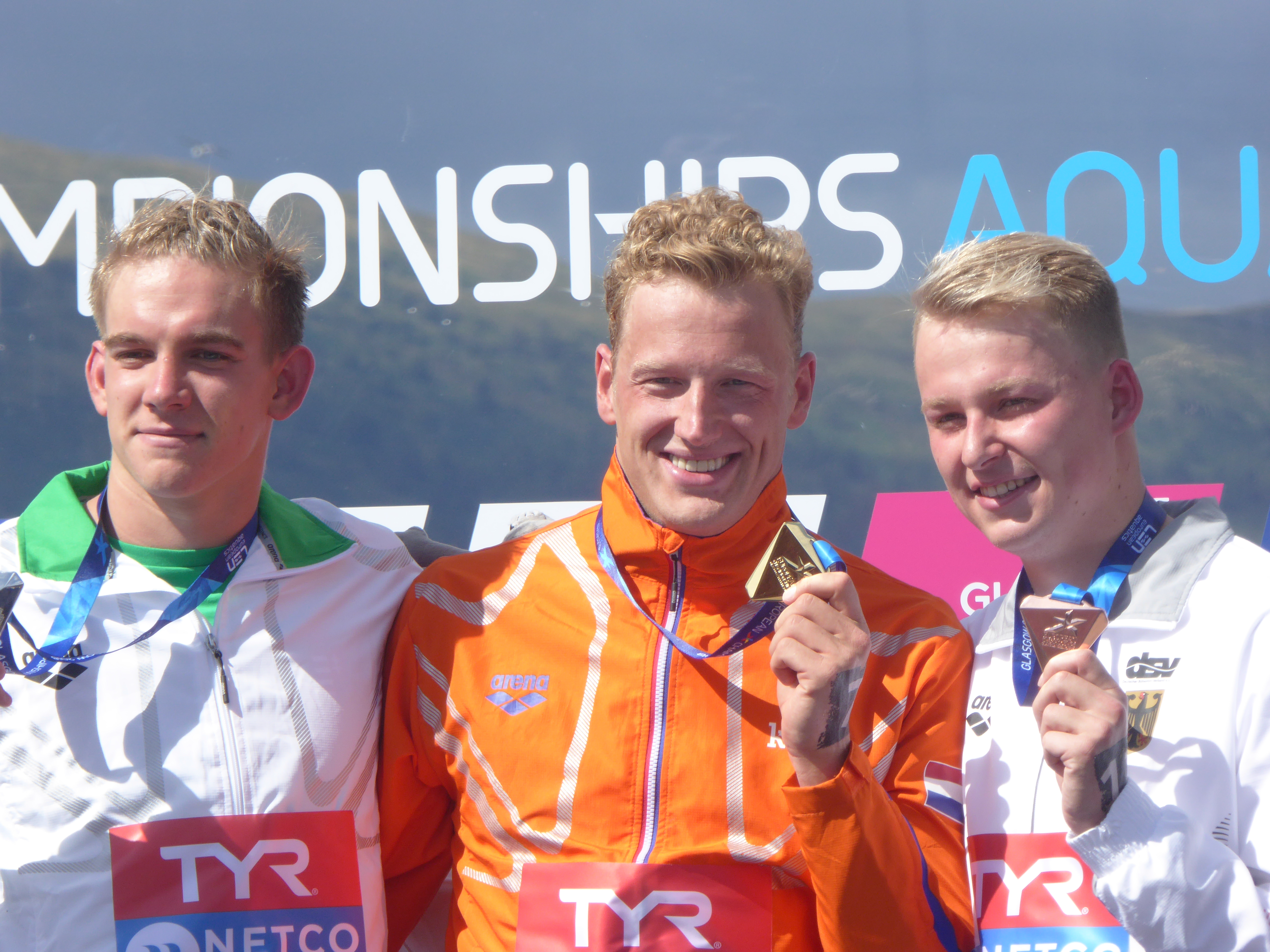
The medallists for the men's 10 km event (from left to right): Kristóf Rasovszky (silver), Ferry Weertman (gold) and Rob Muffels (bronze)

Event	Gold		Silver		Bronze	
5 km	Kristóf Rasovszky; Hungary	52:38.9	Axel Reymond; France	52:41.7	Logan Fontaine; France	52:44.4
10 km	Ferry Weertman; Netherlands	1:49:28.2	Kristóf Rasovszky; Hungary	1:49:28.2	Rob Muffels; Germany	1:49:33.7
25 km	Kristóf Rasovszky; Hungary	4:57.53.5	Kirill Belyaev; Russia	4:57:54.6	Matteo Furlan; Italy	4:57:55.8

=== Women ===
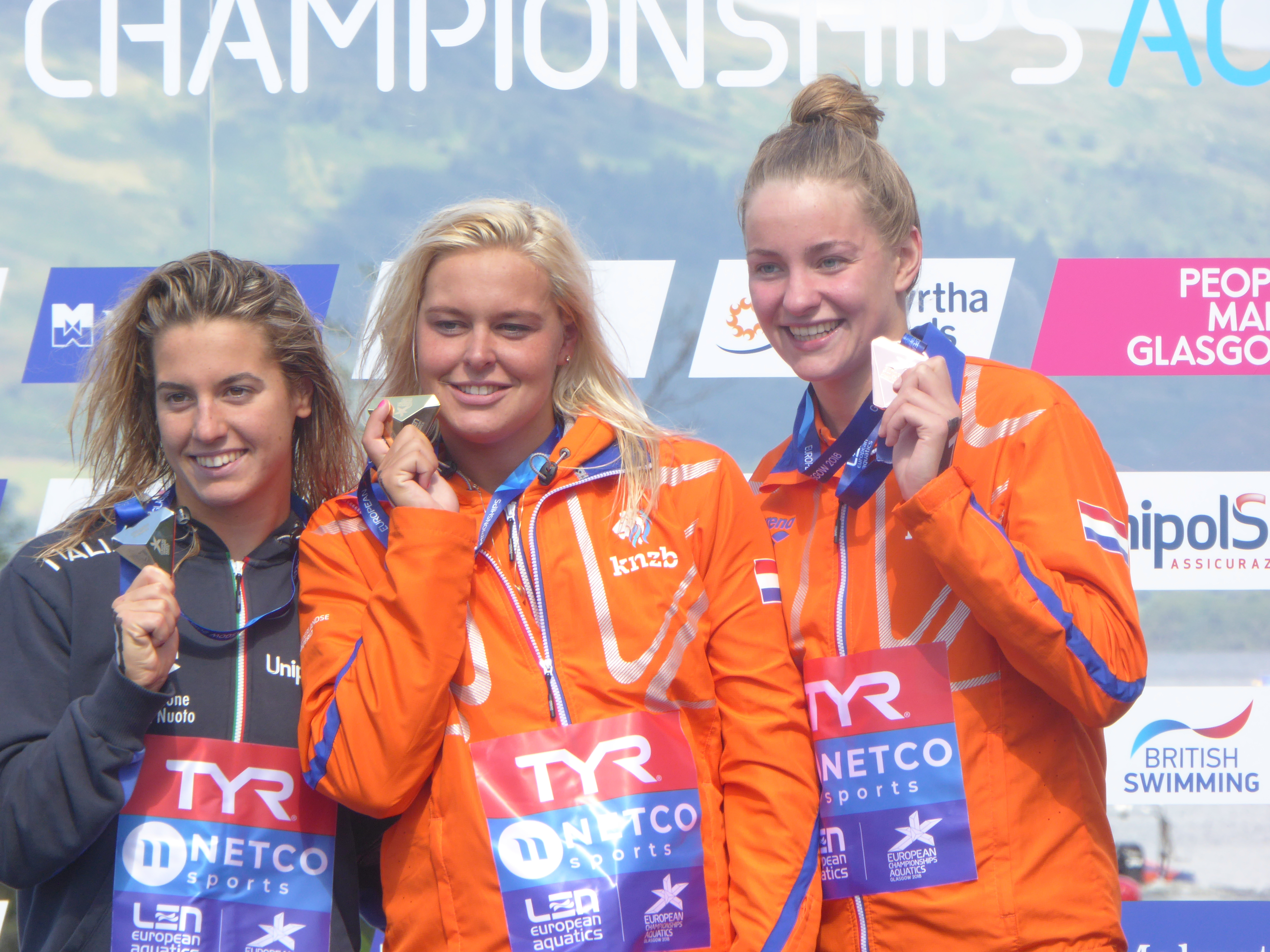
The medallists for the women's 10 km event (from left to right): Giulia Gabbrielleschi (silver), Sharon van Rouwendaal (gold) and Esmee Vermeulen (bronze)

Event	Gold		Silver		Bronze	
5 km	Sharon van Rouwendaal; Netherlands	56:01.0	Leonie Beck; Germany	56:17.8	Rachele Bruni; Italy	56:49.7
10 km	Sharon van Rouwendaal; Netherlands	1:54:45.7	Giulia Gabbrielleschi; Italy	1:54:53.0	Esmee Vermeulen; Netherlands	1:55:27.4
25 km	Arianna Bridi; Italy	5:19:34.6	Sharon van Rouwendaal; Netherlands	5:19:34.7	Lara Grangeon; France	5:19:42.9

=== Mixed events ===
Event	Gold		Silver		Bronze	
Team event	Netherlands; Esmee Vermeulen; Sharon van Rouwendaal; Pepijn Smits; Ferry Weertman	52:35.0	Germany; Leonie Beck; Sarah Köhler; Sören Meißner; Florian Wellbrock	52:35.6	France; Lara Grangeon; David Aubry; Lisa Pou; Marc-Antoine Olivier	52:46.7

== Medal table ==
Rank	Nation	Gold	Silver	Bronze	Total
1	Netherlands (NED)	4	1	1	6
2	Hungary (HUN)	2	1	0	3
3	Italy (ITA)	1	1	2	4
4	Germany (GER)	0	2	1	3
5	France (FRA)	0	1	3	4
6	Russia (RUS)	0	1	0	1
Totals (6 entries)		7	7	7	21

== See also ==
- 2018 European Championships
- List of medalists at the European Open Water Swimming Championships
