= 1993 European Open Water Swimming Championships =

Water sport competitions

- Host city: Slapy
- Country: Czech Republic
- Events: 4
- Opening: 28 August 1993
- Closing: 29 August 1993

The 1993 European Open Water Swimming Championships was the third edition of the European Open Water Swimming Championships and took part from 28 to 29 August 1993 in Slapy, Czech Republic.

== Results ==
=== Men ===
Event	Gold	Silver	Bronze
5 km	Marco Formentini; Italy; 58:10,9	Claudio Gargaro; Italy; 59:08,2	Aleš Havránek; Czech Republic; 59:41,4
25 km	Dario Taraboi; Italy; 5:28:06	Hans van Goor; Netherlands; 5:36:12	Attila Molnár; Hungary; 5:44:30

=== Women ===
Event	Gold	Silver	Bronze
5 km	Olga Šplíchalová; Czech Republic; 1:02:27,3	Carla Geurts; Netherlands; 1:02:59,3	Eva Nováková; Czech Republic; 1:03:46,5
25 km	Anne Chagnaud; France; 5:47:57,8	Gea Veldhuizen; Netherlands; 5:52:52,2	Wandy Kater; Netherlands; 5:53:03,7

== Medal table ==
Rank	Nation	Gold	Silver	Bronze	Total
1	Italy (ITA)	2	1	0	3
2	Czech Republic (CZE)	1	0	2	3
3	France (FRA)	1	0	0	1
4	Netherlands (NED)	0	3	1	4
5	Hungary (HUN)	0	0	1	1
Totals (5 entries)		4	4	4	12

== See also ==
- List of medalists at the European Open Water Swimming Championships
