= Open water swimming at the 2014 European Aquatics Championships – Women's 25 km =

Women's 25 km at the Open water swimming at the 2014 European Aquatics Championships
- Dates: 17 August
- Competitors: 15 from 9 nations
- Winning time: 5:19:14.1

Medalists
| gold medal | Martina Grimaldi | Italy |
| silver medal | Anna Olasz | Hungary |
| bronze medal | Angela Maurer | Germany |

The Women's 25 km competition of the 2014 European Aquatics Championships was held on 17 August.

== Results ==
The race was started at 09:00.

| Rank | Swimmer | Nationality | Time |
|---|---|---|---|
| 1st place, gold medalist(s) | Martina Grimaldi | Italy | 5:19:14.1 |
| 2nd place, silver medalist(s) | Anna Olasz | Hungary | 5:19:21.0 |
| 3rd place, bronze medalist(s) | Angela Maurer | Germany | 5:19:21.4 |
| 4 | Olga Kozydub | Russia | 5:19:32.5 |
| 5 | Margarita Domínguez | Spain | 5:19:44.3 |
| 6 | Ilaria Raimondi | Italy | 5:19:45.7 |
| 7 | Alice Franco | Italy | 5:20:23.0 |
| 8 | Karla Šitić | Croatia | 5:24:32.4 |
| 9 | Silvie Rybářová | Czech Republic | 5:24:41.9 |
| 10 | Aleksandra Sokolova | Russia | 5:26:11.0 |
| 11 | Angelica Andre | Portugal | 5:29:21.4 |
| 12 | Svenja Zihsler | Germany | 5:29:39.9 |
| 13 | Lenka Štěrbová | Czech Republic | 5:35:29.4 |
| — | Finnia Wunram | Germany | DNF |
| — | Nikolett Szilágyi | Hungary | DNF |
