= 2012 European Junior Open Water Swimming Championships =

International swimming competition

- Host city: Karamürsel, Kocaeli Province, Turkey
- Date: July 13–15, 2012
- Venue: Open water Gulf of Izmit
- Nations: 21
- Athletes: 117 (62 male, 55 female)
- Events: 7.5 km junior, 5 km youth, 3 km mixed

The 2012 European Junior Open Water Swimming Championships was part the 14th edition of the European Open Water Swimming Championships event of the LEN European Aquatics Championships for juniors held in Karamürsel, Kocaeli Province, Turkey from July 13 to 15. The event featured in the Gulf of İzmit at northeastern Marmara Sea for junior (17–18 years) and youth (15–16 years) male and female individuals and team event (youth/junior combined).

== Participating nations ==
117 swimmers (62 males, 55 females) from 21 countries swam at the 2012 European Junior Open Water Swimming Championships.

- Australia (1)
- Croatia (4)
- Czech Republic (4)
- France (11)
- Germany (12)
- Greece (6)
- Hungary (4)
- Iceland (3)
- Ireland (1)
- Israel (9)
- Italy (12)
- Netherlands (1)
- Portugal (2)
- Russia (12)
- Slovenia (3)
- Spain (9)
- Sweden (1)
- Switzerland (1)
- Turkey (9)
- Ukraine (4)
- United Kingdom (8)

== Medal table ==
| Rank | Nation | Gold | Silver | Bronze | Total |
|---|---|---|---|---|---|
| 1 | Germany (GER) | 3 | 1 | 2 | 6 |
| 2 | France (FRA) | 1 | 1 | 1 | 3 |
| 2 | Russia (RUS) | 1 | 1 | 1 | 3 |
| 4 | Italy (ITA) | 0 | 1 | 1 | 2 |
| 5 | Great Britain (GBR) | 0 | 1 | 0 | 1 |
| Totals (5 entries) | | 5 | 5 | 5 | 15 |

== Results ==
=== Individual ===
| Event | Gold | | Silver | | Bronze | |
|---|---|---|---|---|---|---|
| 5 km youth boy | Marc Antone Oliver; France | 1:01.42 | Bradley Lynch; United Kingdom | 1:02.00 | David Auruby; France | 1:02.03 |
| 7.5 km junior men | Rob Muffels; Germany | 1:25:21 | Allan Huyghues Beaufond; France | 1:26:07 | Daniel Trosin; Germany | 1:26:09 |

| Event | Gold | | Silver | | Bronze | |
|---|---|---|---|---|---|---|
| 5 km youth girl | Lena Sophie Bermel; Germany | 1:04.10 | Guilia Gabberialleshi; Italy | 1:04.11 | Patrica Lucia Varternberg; Germany | 1:04.17 |
| 7.5 km junior women | Anastasia Krapivina; Russia | 1:31:44 | Finnia Wunram; Germany | 1:31:46 | Angelina Borodina; Russia | 1:31:48 |

=== Team ===
| Event | Gold | Silver | Bronze |
|---|---|---|---|
| 3 km team | Germany; Jonas Steglich; Rob Muffels; Lena-Sophie Bermel | Russia; Kirill Feofilaktov; Roman Karyakin; Anastasia Krapivina | Italy; Federico Brumana; Andrea Bianchi; Erika Musso |
