= Ihor Snitko =

Ukrainian swimmer (born 1978)

Personal information
- Full name: Ігор Снітко
- Nationality: Ukraine
- Born: 13 August 1978 (age 47) Kharkiv, Ukrainian SSR, Soviet Union
- Height: 190 cm (6 ft 3 in)
- Weight: 81 kg (179 lb)

Sport
- Sport: Swimming
- Strokes: Freestyle
Medal record
European Championships (LC)
Gold medal – first place	1999 Istanbul	1500 m freestyle
Silver medal – second place	1997 Seville	1500 m freestyle
European Open Water Championships
Bronze medal – third place	2011 Eilat	10 km open water
European Championships (SC)
Gold medal – first place	1996 Rostock	1500 m freestyle
Silver medal – second place	1998 Sheffield	1500 m freestyle
Summer Universiade
Gold medal – first place	1997 Catania	800 m freestyle
Gold medal – first place	2001 Beijing	400 m freestyle
Gold medal – first place	2001 Beijing	800 m freestyle
Gold medal – first place	2001 Beijing	1500 m freestyle

Ihor Snitko (Ігор Снітко, also spelled Igor Snitko, born 13 August 1978) is a freestyle swimmer from Ukraine, who was a specialist in the long-distance events. He won the silver medal in the men's 1500 m freestyle event at the 1997 European Championships in Seville, Spain, followed by the gold medal two years later in Istanbul. He represented his native country at two consecutive Summer Olympics, starting in Atlanta, Georgia (1996).

Snitko was born in Kharkiv, Ukraine.
