= Federico Vanelli =

Italian swimmer

Personal information
- Nationality: Italian
- Born: 9 March 1991 (age 35) Lodi, Italy

Sport
- Sport: Swimming
- Strokes: Freestyle
- Club: Fiamme Oro
Medal record
Men's swimming
Representing Italy
World Championships
Bronze medal – third place	2017 Budapest	Team event
European Open Water Swimming Championships
Gold medal – first place	2016 Hoorn	Team event
Silver medal – second place	2016 Hoorn	5 km

Federico Vanelli (born 9 March 1991) is an Italian marathon swimmer. He placed seventh in the men's marathon 10 kilometre event at the 2016 Summer Olympics.

He saved the life of a 12-year-old who was about to drown.
