= Arianna Bridi =

Italian swimmer (born 1995)

Personal information
- Nationality: Italian
- Born: 6 November 1995 (age 30) Trento, Italy
- Height: 1.70 m (5 ft 7 in)
- Weight: 60 kg (132 lb)

Sport
- Sport: Swimming
- Strokes: Open water swimming
- Club: C.S. Esercito
Medal record
Women's open water
Representing Italy
Event	1st	2nd	3rd
Olympic Games	0	0	0
World Championships	0	1	2
European Championships	1	0	1
Universiade	1	0	0
Total	2	1	3
World Championships
Silver medal – second place	2024 Doha	Team event
Bronze medal – third place	2017 Budapest	10 km open water
Bronze medal – third place	2017 Budapest	25 km open water
European Championships
Gold medal – first place	2018 Glasgow	25 km open water
Bronze medal – third place	2016 Hoorn	10 km open water

Arianna Bridi (born 6 November 1995) is an Italian swimmer.

She competed in the 25 km open water event at the 2018 European Aquatics Championships, winning the gold medal.

== Achievements ==
Year	Competition	Venue	Position	Event	Time	Notes
2018	European Championships	(United Kingdom) Glasgow	4th	5 km	56:58.8	
2018	European Championships	(United Kingdom) Glasgow	8th	10 km	1:57:27.1	
2018	European Championships	(United Kingdom) Glasgow	1st	25 km	5:19:34.6	
