= Anamarija Petričević =

Croatian swimmer (born 1972)

Personal information
- Full name: Anamarija Petričević
- Nickname: Anći
- National team: Yugoslavia
- Born: 23 August 1972 (age 52)
- Height: 178 cm (5 ft 10 in)
- Weight: 60 kg (132 lb)

Sport
- Sport: Swimming

Anamarija Petričević (born 23 August 1972) is a retired Croatian swimmer.

Anamarija Petričević is a daughter of Đurđica Bjedov, gold and silver medalist in swimming at the 1968 Summer Olympics. Petričević competed for Yugoslavia at the 1988 Summer Olympics. She failed to advance past round one in 200 m breaststroke and 400 m individual medley, but made the B final in 200 m individual medley. In 1989 she won the 5 km gold medal at the European Open Water Swimming Championships held in Stari Grad.

Petričević retired from swimming in 1993. As of 1999, she lives in Locarno, Switzerland, where she works as a swimming coach.

As of 2014 Petričević holds the following senior national records (all set in 1988):

- 50 meter pool
  - 400 m freestyle (4:19.21)
  - 400 m individual medley (4:46.33)
- 25 meter pool
  - 400 individual medley (4:42.09)

Her long-standing national record in 200 m individual medley (2:16.38, 1988) was surpassed by Kim Daniela Pavlin in May 2012.

== Sources ==
- Anamarija Petričević at Sports-Reference.com
- Meni su najviše dragi Goran, Toni i Dražen (in Croatian)
- Hrvatski savez daljinskog plivanja - Reprezentacija (in Croatian)
- Rekordi Hrvatske - Žene - 25m bazen
- Rekordi Hrvatske - Žene - 50m bazen
- Kim Pavlin srušila rekord Anamarije Petričević iz 1988. (in Croatian)
