= Simone Ruffini =

Italian swimmer

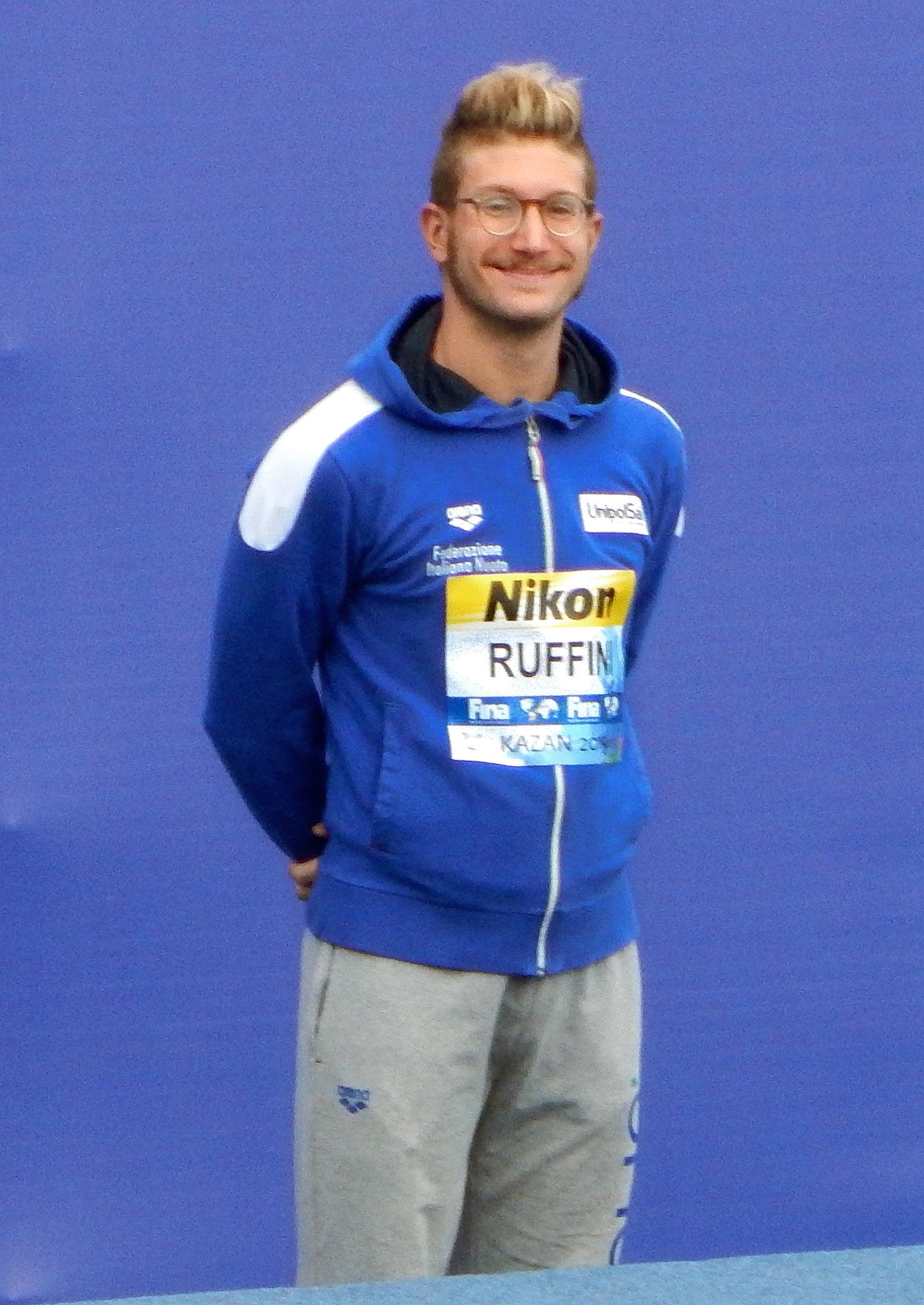

Personal information
- Full name: Simone Ruffini
- Nationality: Italian
- Born: 7 December 1989 (age 36) Tolentino, Italy
- Height: 1.73 m (5 ft 8 in)
- Weight: 67 kg (148 lb)

Sport
- Sport: Swimming
- Strokes: Open water, freestyle
Medal record
Men's swimming
Representing Italy
World Championships
Gold medal – first place	2015 Kazan	25 km
European Championships
Silver medal – second place	2010 Budapest	Team 5 km
Bronze medal – third place	2010 Budapest	5 km
European Open Water Championships
Gold medal – first place	2016 Hoorn	team 5 km
Universiade
Gold medal – first place	2011 Shenzhen	10 km open water

Simone Ruffini (born 7 December 1989) is an Italian swimmer who specializes in long-distance freestyle swimming, especially open water swimming. He won the gold medal in the Men's 25 km open water swimming at the 2015 World Aquatics Championships.
