= Andreas Waschburger =

German swimmer

Personal information
- Nickname: Waschi
- Nationality: German
- Born: January 6, 1987 (age 39) Saarbrücken, West Germany
- Website: andreas-waschburger.de

Sport
- Sport: Swimming
- Strokes: Freestyle
- Club: SSG Saar Max Ritter
- Coach: Jan Wolfgarten
Medal record
Representing Germany
Summer Universiade
Bronze medal – third place	2013 Kazan	10km marathon
European Championships
Silver medal – second place	2012 Piombino	5km open water
Silver medal – second place	2012 Piombino	10km open water
Silver medal – second place	2016 Hoorn	team 5 km
Bronze medal – third place	2012 Piombino	5km mixed team
Ice Swimming World Championships
Gold medal – first place	2023 Samoëns	4 × 50 m mixed relay
Gold medal – first place	2023 Samoëns	4 × 250 m mixed relay
Silver medal – second place	2023 Samoëns	500 m freestyle
Bronze medal – third place	2023 Samoëns	250 m freestyle
Ice Swimming European Championships
Gold medal – first place	2024 Oradea	500 m freestyle
Gold medal – first place	2024 Oradea	1,000 m freestyle
Bronze medal – third place	2024 Oradea	250 m freestyle
Bronze medal – third place	2024 Oradea	4 × 250 m relay

Andreas Waschburger (born 6 January 1987) is a German professional swimmer, specialising in open water swimming.

== Life ==
Andreas Waschburger lives in Saarbrücken, Germany. He is a police commissioner and belongs to the sports group of the Saarland police.

== Career ==
Waschburger began open water swimming in 2004. In 2009, he finished third in the overall European Cup, and in 2010 and 2013, he won this series over 5 and 10 kilometers. In 2011, he won a World Cup race in Cancún and finished third in the overall World Cup standings. He finished 17th at the European Championships in Budapest in 2010 and tenth at the World Championships the following year. This qualified him for the 2012 Summer Olympics, finishing 8th in the 10 km open water marathon.

In 2013, he competed at the Universiade in Kazan over 10 kilometers and finished third behind Matteo Furlan (Italy) and Romain Berand (France).

At the 2012 European Open Water Swimming Championships in Piombino, Italy, Waschburger finished second in the 5 km and 10 km events. In 2017, he became the first German to win Vansbrosimningen in Sweden.

In early 2023, he became world champion in ice swimming with the German mixed relay team. At the 2024 European Ice Swimming Championships in Oradea, Romania, Waschburger won gold in the 500 m freestyle with a world record time of 5:32.72 and in the 1000 m freestyle with a world record time of 11:24.20. He also took bronze medals in the 250 m freestyle and the 4×250 m mixed relay. In January 2025, he defended his titles at the Ice Swimming World Championships in Molveno, Italy, winning gold in the 1000 m and 500 m freestyle, and silver in the 250 m freestyle and 4×250 m mixed relay.

On September 8, 2023, Waschburger crossed the English Channel from Dover to Calais in 6 hours 45 minutes and 25 seconds, breaking the eleven-year-old world record for this 32.31 km distance.

On October 6, 2024, he set a new world record crossing the 44 km Molokai Channel in 9 hours 55 minutes 10 seconds, beating the previous record by 2 hours and 7 minutes.
