= Alice Franco =

Italian swimmer

Personal information
- National team: Italy
- Born: 10 February 1989 (age 37) Asti, Italy
- Height: 1.67 m (5 ft 6 in)
- Weight: 60 kg (132 lb)

Sport
- Sport: Swimming
- Strokes: Freestyle
- Club: C.S. Esercito
Medal record
Event	1st	2nd	3rd
World Championships	0	0	1
European Championships	2	0	2
Universiade	0	0	1
Total	2	0	4
World Championships
Bronze medal – third place	2011 Shanghai	25 km open water
European Championships
Gold medal – first place	2011 Eilat	25 km open water
Gold medal – first place	2012 Piombino	25 km open water
Bronze medal – third place	2008 Dubrovnik	5 km open water
Bronze medal – third place	2008 Dubrovnik	10 km open water
Universiade
Bronze medal – third place	2011 Shenzhen	10 km marathon

Alice Franco (born 10 February 1989) is an Italian swimmer bronze medal at senior level at the 2011 World Aquatics Championships.

She also was twice European champion, in 2011 and 2012.
