= Danielle Huskisson =

British swimmer (born 1993)

Personal information
- Nationality: British
- Born: 27 March 1993 (age 33) South Shields, England

Sport
- Sport: Swimming
- Club: University of Stirling
Medal record
Representing Great Britain
European Championships
Gold medal – first place	2016 Hoorn	5km open water

Danielle Huskisson (born 27 March 1993) is a British swimmer, specialising in open water events. She competed in the women's 10 km event at the 2019 World Aquatics Championships and she finished in 25th place.
