= Nace Majcen =

Slovenian swimmer

Personal information
- Full name: Nace Majcen
- Nationality: Slovenia
- Born: 12 July 1968 (age 57) Ljubljana, Slovenia, Yugoslavia

Sport
- Sport: Swimming
- Strokes: Freestyle
- Club: Olimpija, Ljubljana
Medal record
Representing Yugoslavia
Mediterranean Games
Bronze medal – third place	1987 Latakia	4x100m Freestyle

Nace Majcen (born 12 July 1968 in Ljubljana) is a retired male freestyle swimmer from Slovenia. He represented his native country at the 1992 Summer Olympics in Barcelona, Spain, competing in two individual events (200m and 400m freestyle). He later started a career in marathon swimming, competing for instance at the 1998 World Aquatics Championships.

He ended the career in 2002 and became a coach. His brother Igor also was a swimmer.
