= Esmee Vermeulen =

Dutch swimmer

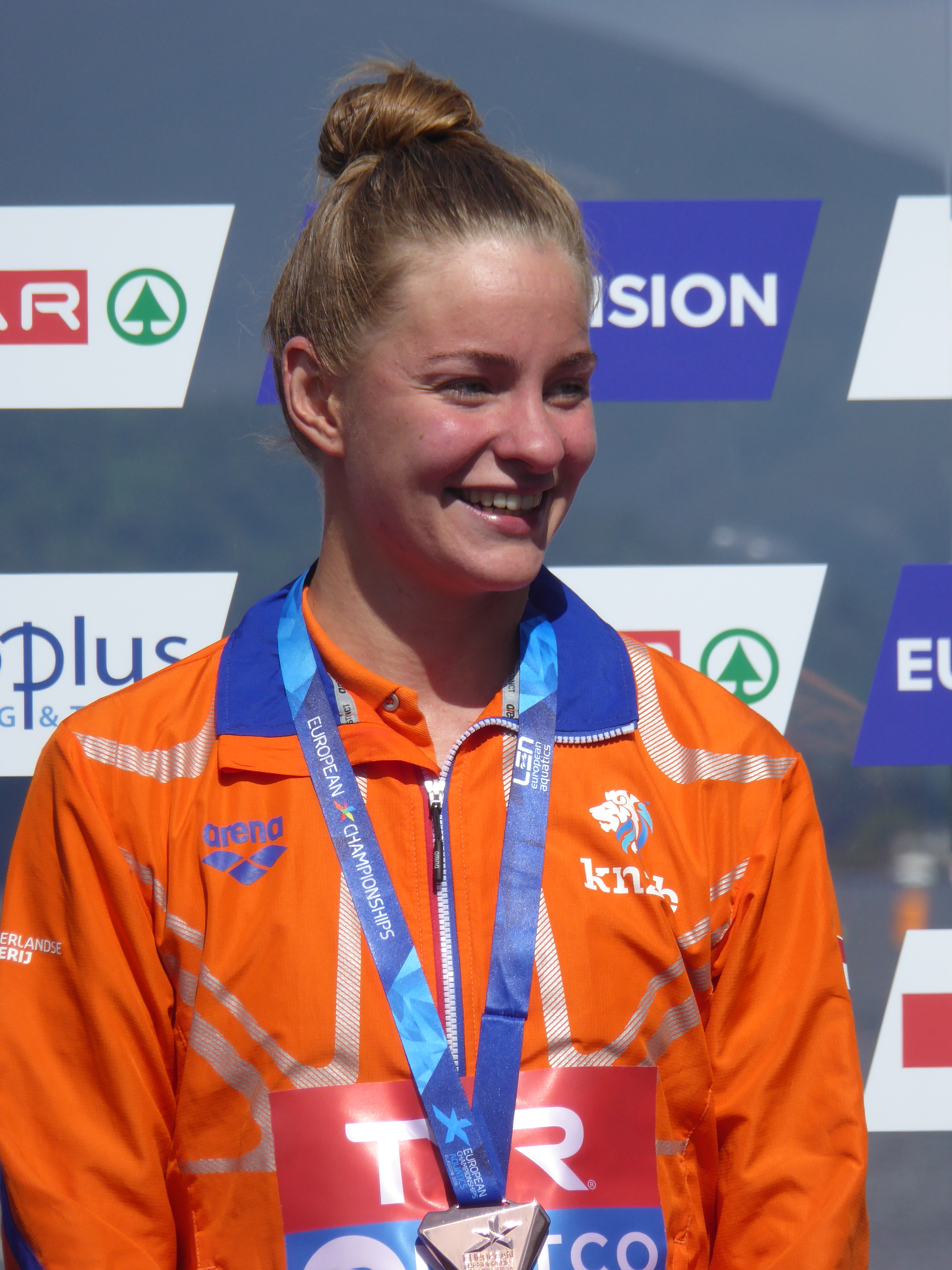
- Vermeulen at the 2018 European Open Water Swimming Championships

Personal information
- National team: Netherlands
- Born: 21 April 1996 (age 30) Zaandam, Netherlands
- Height: 1.80 m (5 ft 11 in)

Sport
- Sport: Swimming
- Strokes: Freestyle
- Club: De Dolfijn
Medal record
Women's swimming
Representing the Netherlands
World Championships (LC)
Bronze medal – third place	2013 Barcelona	4×100 m freestyle
World Championships (SC)
Gold medal – first place	2014 Doha	4×50 m freestyle
Gold medal – first place	2014 Doha	4×100 m freestyle
Gold medal – first place	2014 Doha	4×200 m freestyle
European Championships (LC)
Gold medal – first place	2018 Glasgow	Team open water
Silver medal – second place	2014 Berlin	4×100 m freestyle
Bronze medal – third place	2016 London	4×200 m freestyle
Bronze medal – third place	2018 Glasgow	10 km open water

Esmee Vermeulen (born 21 April 1996) is a Dutch swimmer.

Vermeulen made her international senior debut at the 2011 European Short Course Swimming Championships in Szczecin, Poland. At the 2014 short-course world championships in Doha, she won three gold medals for swimming in the heats of all three freestyle relays. Together with her teammates Ranomi Kromowidjojo, Maud van der Meer, and Inge Dekker, she broke the world record in the heats of the 4×50 m freestyle relay.

Vermeulen qualified for the 2016 Summer Olympics in Rio de Janeiro in the 4 × 200 meter freestyle relay, where the team finished 14th in the heats.
