= Britta Kamrau =

German swimmer

Personal information
- Born: April 6, 1979 (age 47) Rostock, West Germany

Sport
- Sport: Swimming
Medal record
Representing Germany
World Championships
Gold medal – first place	2007 Melbourne	25 km open water
Silver medal – second place	2003 Barcelona	25 km open water
Silver medal – second place	2005 Montréal	25 km open water
Bronze medal – third place	2003 Barcelona	5 km open water
Bronze medal – third place	2005 Montréal	10 km open water
European Championships
Gold medal – first place	2004 Madrid	5 km open water
Gold medal – first place	2004 Madrid	10 km open water
Gold medal – first place	2004 Madrid	25 km open water
Silver medal – second place	2000 Helsinki	5 km open water
Bronze medal – third place	1999 Istanbul	5 km open water
Bronze medal – third place	1999 Istanbul	25 km open water
Bronze medal – third place	2002 Berlin	10 km open water

Britta Kamrau-Corestein (born 6 April 1979) is a German long-distance swimmer. She is a former European champion at the 5 km, 10 km and 25 km open water distances and former world champion at the 25 km.

In March 2007 she was the center of some controversy after she claimed that Australian swimmer Kate Brookes-Peterson pulled her from behind in the final 100 meters of the 5 km open water race at the 2007 World Aquatics Championships denying her a bronze medal.

== See also ==
- World Open Water Championships - Multiple medalists
