= Tanja Godina =

Slovenian swimmer

Personal information
- Full name: Tanja Godina
- Nationality: Slovenia
- Born: 21 September 1971 (age 54) Maribor

Sport
- Sport: Swimming
- Strokes: Backstroke

Tanja Godina (born 21 September 1971 in Maribor) is a retired female backstroke swimmer from Slovenia. She was the only woman in the Slovenian Swimming Squad (five swimmers) at the 1992 Summer Olympics in Barcelona, Spain, and also the youngest member (21 years, 311 days).
