= Anna Guseva =

Russian swimmer

Personal information
- Born: July 27, 1987 (age 39) Moscow, Soviet Union

Sport
- Sport: Swimming
Medal record
Representing Russia
European Championships
Bronze medal – third place	2010 Budapest	5km mixed team

Anna Guseva (born July 27, 1987) is a Russian distance swimmer. At the 2012 Summer Olympics, she competed in the Women's marathon 10 kilometre, finishing in 10th place. Trained by Elezarova Galina Alekseievna.
