= Petar Stoychev =

Bulgarian swimmer

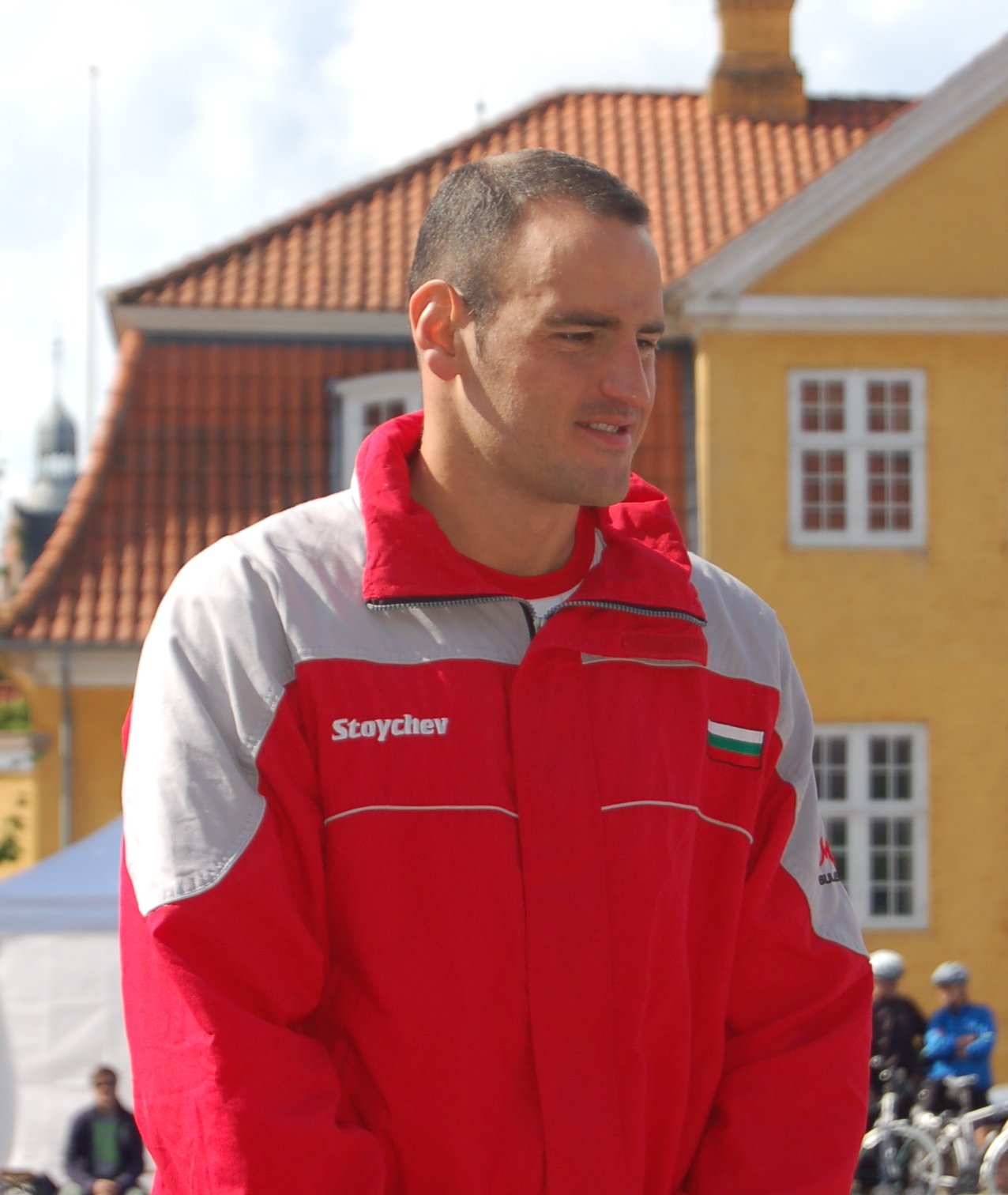
- Petar Stoychev after winning the silver medal at the 2009 World Cup event in Copenhagen, Denmark

Personal information
- Full name: Petar Stoychev
- Nationality: Bulgaria
- Born: 24 October 1976 (age 49) Momchilgrad, Bulgaria
- Height: 1.93 m (6 ft 4 in)
- Weight: 90 kg (198 lb)

Sport
- Sport: Swimming
- Strokes: Freestyle
- Club: Levski Sofia (BUL)
Medal record
Men's swimming
Representing Bulgaria
World Championships
Gold medal – first place	2011 Shanghai	25 km open water
Silver medal – second place	2000 Honolulu	10 km open water
Bronze medal – third place	2003 Barcelona	25 km open water
Bronze medal – third place	2005 Montréal	10 km open water
Bronze medal – third place	2005 Montréal	25 km open water
Bronze medal – third place	2006 Naples	25 km open water
Bronze medal – third place	2010 Roberval	25 km open water
European Championships
Gold medal – first place	2012 Piombino	25 km open water
Silver medal – second place	2011 Eilat	25 km open water
Bronze medal – third place	2004 Madrid	25 km open water

Petar Stoychev (Bulgarian: Петър Стойчев; born 24 October 1976 in Momchilgrad) is a Bulgarian swimmer who is one of the most successful long distance marathon swimmers in history. He is an honor swimmer in the International Marathon Swimming Hall of Fame. Stoychev has 11 consecutive titles of a major international open water marathon swimming FINA series since 2001 (World Cup winner 2001–2006, Grand Prix winner 2007–2011) with more than 60 wins in individual swimming marathons. So far, he has swum over 60,000 km in pools, rivers, lakes, seas and oceans. Petar Stoychev has won 11 consecutive victories at the Traversée Internationale du Lac Memphrémagog in Magog, Canada (34 km) and at Lac Saint-Jean in Roberval, Canada (32 km). Also, he has won the Ohrid Lake, North Macedonia swimming marathon 11 consecutive times (30 km). His swimming achievements include swimming around the Manhattan Island in 2010 and winning the extreme Cadiz Freedom Swim in 2011.

In addition to his numerous achievements in marathon swimming, he has participated in four Olympics – 2000 Summer Olympics in Sydney, 2004 Summer Olympics in Athens, 2008 Summer Olympics in Beijing, where he was the flag bearer for the Bulgarian Olympic team, and finished 6th in 10km at the 2012 Summer Olympics in London.

Petar Stoychev was formerly the holder of the world record for crossing the English Channel (24 August 2007) and the first swimmer to make the crossing in less than 7 hours (6:57:50). The previous record from 2005 (7:03:50) belonged to Christoph Wandratch (Germany). His record was broken by Australian swimmer Trent Grimsey on 8 September 2012.

English Channel Swims

- 2006 – 7 h 21 mins
- 2007 – 6 h 57 mins (WR)

Petar Stoychev won the first place at 2011 World Aquatics Championships in Shanghai, China during the 25 km event, thus becoming the first Bulgarian swimmer with a World Championship title.

He was inducted in the International Marathon Swimming Hall of Fame in Fort Lauderdale, Florida in September 2009. Petar Stoychev was selected in a global online poll as the 2009 World Open Water Swimming Man of the Year for his victorious marathon swims throughout the year.

Petar Stoychev is a member of the FINA Athletes' Commission.

In August 2024, he became the first Bulgarian to complete the Oceans Seven. In September 2024, he repeated his English Channel swim to reduce total time and set the world record for fastest completed Oceans Seven.
