= Igor Majcen =

Slovenian swimmer

Personal information
- Full name: Igor Majcen
- Nationality: Slovenian
- Born: August 24, 1969 (age 56) Ljubljana, SR Slovenia, SFR Yugoslavia

Sport
- Sport: Swimming
- Strokes: Freestyle
- Club: Olimpija, Ljubljana
Medal record
Representing Slovenia
European Championships (LC)
Bronze medal – third place	1993 Sheffield	1500 m freestyle
Representing Yugoslavia
Mediterranean Games
Bronze medal – third place	1987 Latakia	400m Freestyle

Igor Majcen (born August 24, 1969 in Ljubljana) is a retired male freestyle swimmer from Slovenia. He is a three-time Olympian, making his debut in 1988 for SFR Yugoslavia.

His best Olympic result was finishing in sixth place in the men's 1500 m freestyle event at the 1992 Summer Olympics in Barcelona, Spain. He was named Slovenian Sportsman of the Year in 1993, after having won the bronze medal in the men's 1500 m freestyle event at the 1993 European LC Championships in Sheffield.
