= Brian Ryckeman =

Belgian swimmer

Medal record

Men's swimming

Representing Belgium

World Championships
Silver medal – second place	2013 Barcelona	25 km open water

European Championships
Gold medal – first place	2011 Eilat	25 km open water

Brian Ryckeman (born 13 July 1984) is a Belgian professional swimmer, specialising in Open water swimming. He competed at the 2008 and 2012 Summer Olympics.
