= Peggy Büchse =

German swimmer

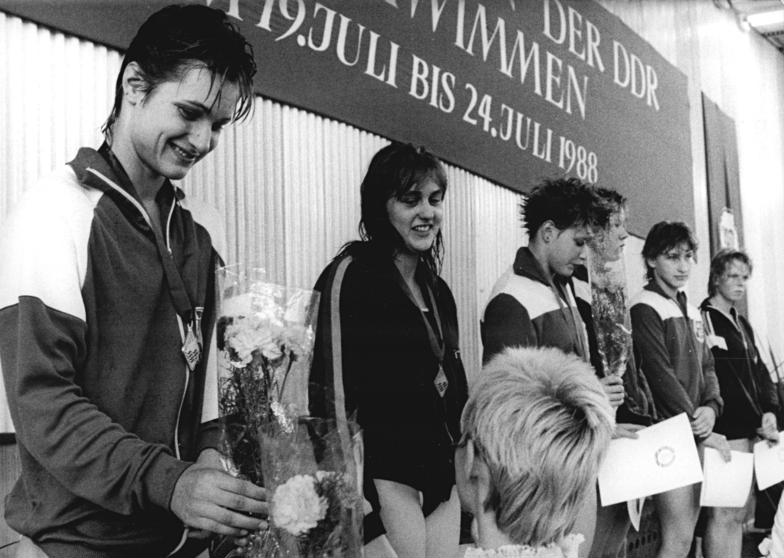
- Peggy Büchse (third from left) in 1988

Personal information
- Born: September 9, 1972 (age 53) Rostock, East Germany

Sport
- Sport: Swimming
Medal record
Representing Germany
World Championships
Gold medal – first place	2001 Fukuoka	10 km open water
Silver medal – second place	1998 Perth	25 km open water
Silver medal – second place	2001 Fukuoka	5 km open water
Bronze medal – third place	1998 Perth	5 km open water
European Championships
Gold medal – first place	1995 Vienna	25 km open water
Gold medal – first place	1997 Seville	5 km open water
Gold medal – first place	1999 Istanbul	5 km open water
Gold medal – first place	2000 Helsinki	5 km open water
Gold medal – first place	2000 Helsinki	25 km open water
Silver medal – second place	1995 Vienna	5 km open water

Peggy Büchse (born 9 September 1972) is a former long-distance swimmer from Germany, who won her first international title at the 1987 European Junior Championships (400 m freestyle). In the early 1990s, she switched to open water swimming and won several international titles. Büchse retired in 2002.
