= Hans van Goor =

Dutch swimmer (born 1970)

Personal information
- Born: 1970 (age 55–56) Zwaag, North Holland, Netherlands

Sport
- Sport: Swimming
Medal record
Representing Netherlands
European Championships (LC)
Silver medal – second place	1993 Sheffield	25 km open water
Bronze medal – third place	1991 Athens	5 km open water

Hans van Goor (born 1970) is a retired Dutch long-distance swimmer who won a silver medal at the 1993 European Championships. He also swam the English Channel on 4 September 1995 in a time of 8 h and 02 mins, which stood as a European record until 2003. He is the coach and husband of fellow long-distance swimmer Edith van Dijk.

Van Goor studied econometrics and law at the Vrije Universiteit, Amsterdam. He is Chief Operating Officer at the sports-oriented DSB Bank, where he has been employed since 1994. Since early 2019 Hans van Goor took a position of CEO of the Dutch startup company, related to Discoperi Inc.
