= Sergey Bolshakov =

Russian swimmer

Personal information
- Born: June 6, 1988 (age 38) Izhevsk, Soviet Union

Sport
- Sport: Swimming
- Club: Central Army Sports Club
Medal record
Representing Russia
World Championships
Bronze medal – third place	2011 Shanghai	10km open water
European Championships
Bronze medal – third place	2010 Budapest	Team 5 km

Sergey Bolshakov (born 6 June 1988) is a Russian professional swimmer, specialising in Open water swimming. He won the bronze medal in the 10 km open water marathon at the 2011 World Championships. He competed at the 2012 Summer Olympics.

He took up swimming at the age of nine in his home town, after being encouraged to do so by his mother, who was also a swimmer. He competes for the Central Army Sports Club (CSKA). Since 2010, his coach has been Elena Nurgaleyeva. He made his international debut for Russia in 2007.
