= Jan Wolfgarten =

German swimmer (born 1982)

Personal information
- Born: 17 March 1982 (age 44) Frankfurt, West Germany

Sport
- Sport: Swimming
Medal record
Representing Germany
World Championships
Bronze medal – third place	2011 Shanghai	Team
European Championships (SC)
Gold medal – first place	2009 Istanbul	1500 m freestyle

Jan Wolfgarten (born 17 March 1982) is a German swimmer. He participates in the open water events.

He won the bronze medal at the Team 5 km world championships.
