= Christof Wandratsch =

German swimmer

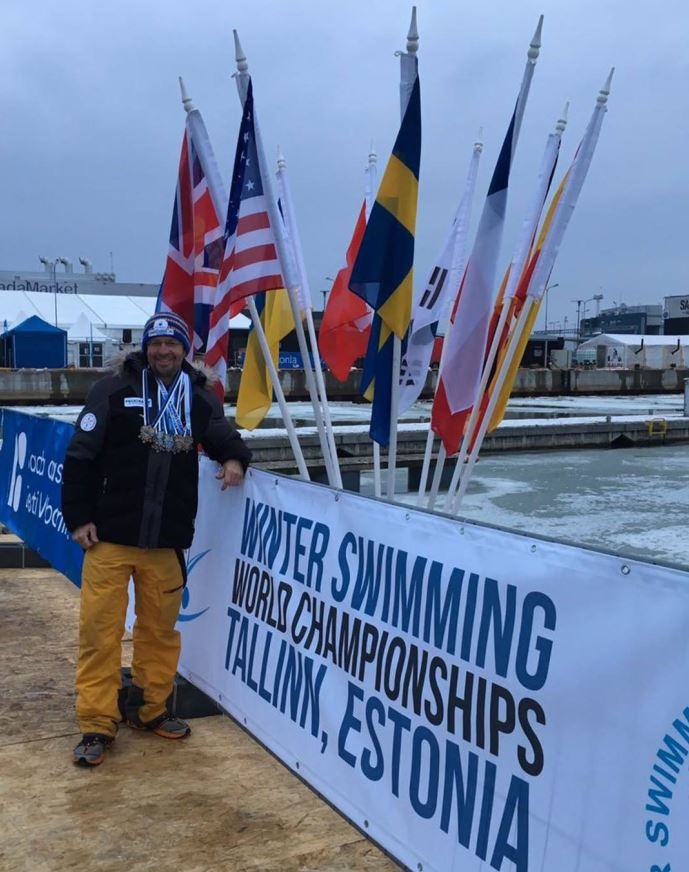
- Christof Wandratsch in 2018

Personal information
- Born: 20 December 1966 (age 59)
Medal record
Men's swimming
Representing Germany
European Championships
| Gold medal – first place | 1991 Terracina | 25 km open water |
| Gold medal – first place | 1995 Vienna | 25 km open water |
| Silver medal – second place | 1995 Vienna | 5 km open water |
| Silver medal – second place | 1997 Seville | 25 km open water |

Christof Wandratsch (born 20 December 1966) is a long distance swimmer from Germany. In 1990 he won the Lake Zurich Swim. In August 2005 he set the world record for the fastest ever swim of the English Channel in a time of 7 h 03 mins, beating the previous record set by Chad Hundeby in 1994 of 7 h 17 mins. Christof came extremely close to beating the record in 2003, failing by just 3 mins, finishing in a time of 7 h 20 mins.

His record was broken by 6 mins in 2007 by Petar Stoychev who set at time of 6 h 57 mins.
