= Gilles Rondy =

French open water swimmer (born 1981)

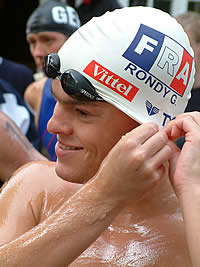
- Gilles Rondy at the start of the European Championships in Berlin, 2002

Personal information
- National team: France
- Born: 4 September 1981 (age 45) Brest, France

Sport
- Sport: Swimming
- Strokes: Open water swimming
Medal record
Representing France
Men's open water swimming
European Championships
Gold medal – first place	2006 Budapest	25 km
Silver medal – second place	2002 Berlin	25 km

Gilles Rondy (born 4 September 1981 in Brest) is a French open water swimmer. A former member of the French national team, he was European champion over 25 km in 2006 and has held the French record for the English Channel swim since 2004. He is also known for a series of long-distance solo crossings and for his environmental advocacy for the protection of the seas and oceans.

== Biography ==
Originally from Brittany, Gilles Rondy grew up in a culture shaped by the ocean before living for several years in Martinique, and then settling in the French Basque Country, where he now lives with his wife and two daughters. He describes open water swimming as a space of "power and silence", one that led him from elite competition to a broader commitment to protecting the seas and oceans.

== Sporting career ==
=== International competition (2001–2008) ===
A member of the French national swimming team, Rondy competed for nearly a decade in most of the international open water circuit organised by FINA (the Open Water Swimming World Cup, the World Championships and the European Championships), over distances of 10 km and 25 km, as well as in marathons of 15 to 57 km during World Cup legs.

He took part in the World Championships in 2001 (Fukuoka), 2003 (Barcelona), 2005 (Montreal), 2006 (Naples), 2007 (Melbourne) and 2008 (Seville), and won two medals at the European Championships in the 25 km open water event: silver in Berlin in 2002 and gold in Budapest in 2006. He was selected to represent France in the 10 km open water event at the 2008 Summer Olympics in Beijing, where he finished 15th.

=== Solo crossings ===
==== English Channel (2004) ====
On 9 September 2004, Rondy swam across the English Channel between England and France in 7 h 54 min, a time that set the French record for the discipline, still standing more than twenty years later. According to his own account, he was ahead of world-record pace for more than five hours before a turn of the tide—following a start delayed by the weather—slowed him over the final kilometres.

==== Ushant – mainland ====
Rondy swam from the island of Ushant to the Breton mainland, a distance of about 30 km across the Fromveur Passage, one of the strongest currents in Europe, which separates the Molène archipelago from Ushant. The start was given at night to make use of the favourable current. An equipment failure forced him to swim without a wetsuit in water of 12–13 °C, while several support swimmers wearing neoprene wetsuits had to give up because of the cold.

==== Saint Lucia – Martinique (2017) ====
On 13 May 2017, he became the first swimmer to cross from Saint Lucia to Martinique, through the channel separating the two islands, in 10 h 58 min over about 34 km. On his own website, the crossing is described as 40 km long and completed in 11 hours, marked by a passage through a swarm of jellyfish that caused prolonged vomiting. According to the Ultraswimming.org database, this was the first crossing ever recorded on this route ("Overall First").

=== Martinique Challenge (2026) ===
On 9 May 2026, Rondy swam from La Trinité to Fort-de-France, a distance of about 80 km along the north coast of Martinique (Le Prêcheur, Le Carbet), in 22 hours of continuous swimming, by day and by night, without a wetsuit or physical assistance. The effort, estimated at 75,000 arm strokes, resulted in a 5 kg weight loss and critical moments described by the swimmer himself—"The last 10 kilometres took me four hours"—in particular during the night passage into the wind between Le Prêcheur and Le Carbet.

The crossing was designed as a full-scale test ahead of the Mediterranean Challenge, in order to assess the athlete's ability to swim for more than 20 hours without interruption. It received national and international media coverage, notably from Martinique 1ère (France Info), RCI Martinique, Le Parisien, Ouest-France and Le Télégramme, as well as the international press, including the Romanian daily Libertatea.

=== Mediterranean Challenge: Calvi–Nice crossing (planned, 2026) ===
Rondy is preparing, for the second half of August 2026, an attempt to swim across the Mediterranean Sea between Calvi (Corsica) and Nice (mainland), presented as a world first under these conditions. The straight-line distance between the two points is 160 km, but Mediterranean currents would bring the actual distance swum to about 180 km (up to 200 km by some estimates), for an estimated 60 to 120 hours of continuous swimming, without leaving the water or touching the escort boat, at a target average speed of about 3 km/h.

The project is run by the Défi, Nage, Mer et Océan association, with an announced budget of €65,000 for maritime logistics, safety and video capture. It also carries an environmental message about the warming of the Mediterranean, presented as warming 20% faster than the global average, and about plastic pollution of the oceans.

== Honours ==
- European Championships
  - 2002 European Championships in Berlin
    - Silver Silver medal in the 25 km open water
  - 2006 European Championships in Budapest
    - Gold Gold medal in the 25 km open water (5 h 10 min 17 s)
- Open Water Swimming World Cup
  - Third overall in the 2005 World Cup (6 podiums)
- French Championships
  - French champion in the 25 km open water in 2002, 2005 and 2006
- Solo crossings
  - French record holder for the English Channel swim since 2004
  - First swim crossing between Saint Lucia and Martinique (2017)
  - 30 km crossing between Ushant and the Breton mainland, through the Fromveur current
  - La Trinité–Fort-de-France crossing (80 km, 22 h of continuous swimming, 9 May 2026)

== Results ==
The results below are drawn from the Ultraswimming.org database, reproduced on the website of the Défi, Nage, Mer et Océan association.

=== Solo swims ===
Date	Event	Route	Distance (km)	Time
9 September 2004	English Channel	England → France	33	07:54:00
13 May 2017	Saint Lucia Channel	Saint Lucia → Martinique	34	10:58:00

=== International races ===
Date	Event	Venue / route	Distance (km)	Result
16 July 2001	World Championships	Fukuoka (Japan)	5	00:56:57 (8th/32)
23 February 2002	FINA World Cup	Rosario (Argentina)	22	02:05:40 (9th/25)
3 March 2002	FINA World Cup	Santa Fe → Coronda (Argentina)	57	07:40:48 (5th/18)
15 March 2002	FINA World Cup	Dubai (buoy course)	16	03:21:47 (12th/24)
14 April 2002	FINA World Cup	Brasília (buoy course)	10	02:05:22 (6th/13)
26 July 2002	European Championships	Berlin	25	05:18:02 (2nd/19) — Silver
2 March 2003	FINA World Cup	Santa Fe → Coronda (Argentina)	57	07:35:07 (7th/20)
13 July 2003	World Championships	Barcelona	10	01:51:13 (7th/32)
30 August 2003	Faros Marathon Swim	Stari Grad Bay (out and back)	16	03:30:10 (3rd/18)
1 November 2003	FINA World Cup	Cancún (buoy course)	10	01:48:05 (10th/18)
29 February 2004	FINA World Cup	Santa Fe → Coronda (Argentina)	57	08:23:51 (2nd/19)
19 March 2004	FINA World Cup	Ain Sokhna (Red Sea)	10	02:02:55 (6th/29)
12 May 2004	European Championships	Madrid	10	01:45:30 (9th/17)
15 May 2004	European Championships	Madrid	25	04:18:27 (8th/17)
20 June 2004	FINA World Cup	Hong Kong (Repulse Bay)	10	01:55:54 (6th/17)
10 July 2004	Maratona del Golfo Capri-Napoli	Capri → Naples	30.8	07:20:08 (10th/30)
24 July 2004	FINA World Cup	Atlantic City, Absecon Island loop	36.6	07:01:14 (7th/23)
31 July 2004	FINA World Cup	Lac Saint-Jean crossing, Péribonka → Roberval	32	06:38:29 (5th/28)
2 April 2005	FINA World Cup	Cañón del Sumidero (Mexico)	15	03:35:51 (2nd/31)
12 June 2005	FINA World Cup	London (buoy course)	10	01:57:36 (3rd/20)
18 June 2005	Ohrid Swim Marathon	Sveti Naum → Ohrid	30	05:23:58 (1st/21)
26 June 2005	FINA World Cup	Jarak → Šabac (Serbia)	19	02:33:33 (3rd/28)
17 July 2005	World Championships	Montreal	25	05:00:35 (7th/30)
17 July 2005	World Championships	Montreal	10	01:47:04 (4th/31)
30 July 2005	Traversée internationale du lac Saint-Jean	Péribonka → Roberval	32	06:56:03 (3rd/27)
11 September 2005	FINA World Cup	Ismailia (Egypt)	10	01:54:04 (2nd/14)
16 September 2005	FINA World Cup	Fujairah (United Arab Emirates)	10	02:09:19 (4th/16)
22 September 2005	FINA World Cup	Dubai (buoy course)	10	02:09:23 (5th/17)
2 October 2005	FINA World Cup	Hong Kong (Repulse Bay)	10	01:59:11 (10th/20)
26 February 2006	FINA World Cup	Santa Fe → Coronda (Argentina)	57	08:13:13 (8th/21)
17 June 2006	FINA World Cup	Seville (buoy course)	10	01:54:06 (1st/33)
9 July 2006	FINA World Cup	Jarak → Šabac (Serbia)	19	02:30:57 (5th/30)
26 July 2006	European Championships	Budapest	10	01:58:23 (5th/28)
29 July 2006	European Championships	Budapest	25	05:10:17 (1st/15) — Gold
29 August 2006	World Championships	Naples	10	02:11:01 (16th/37)
29 August 2006	World Championships	Naples	25	05:58:41 (8th/15)
17 March 2007	World Championships	Melbourne	10	01:58:41 (29th/53)
17 March 2007	World Championships	Melbourne	25	05:54:19 (14th/20)
9 June 2007	FINA World Cup 10 km	Seville (buoy course)	10	01:53:01 (25th/56)
17 June 2007	FINA World Cup 10 km	London (buoy course)	10	01:56:16 (7th/31)
13 October 2007	FINA Grand Prix	Cañón del Sumidero (Mexico)	15	03:18:17 (11th/33)
15 March 2008	FINA World Cup 10 km	Dubai (buoy course)	10	01:49:13 (15th/44)
3 May 2008	World Championships	Seville	10	01:53:39 (11th/52)
28 June 2008	FINA World Cup 10 km	Setúbal (Portugal)	10	01:55:29 (7th/20)
21 August 2008	Olympic Games	Beijing	10	01:52:16 (15th/25)

== Environmental advocacy and association ==
Gilles Rondy founded the non-profit association Défi, Nage, Mer et Océan, whose registered office is located in Boucau (Pyrénées-Atlantiques). The association's purpose is to promote open water swimming while supporting the protection of the Mediterranean Sea and marine environments; it states that it donates any financial surplus in full to a marine protection association, and specifies that no member of the board, including Gilles Rondy, receives any direct or indirect remuneration.

== In the media ==
The May 2026 Martinique crossing and the Calvi–Nice project received media coverage in France and abroad, notably from:

- Martinique la 1ère (France Info), reports and live coverage of the finish;
- RCI Martinique, interview and broadcast of the conclusion;
- Le Parisien, Ouest-France and Le Télégramme, national coverage;
- the French Swimming Federation, regarding the Mediterranean crossing project;
- the Romanian daily Libertatea, for the international coverage of the Martinique feat.
