= Yvette Tulip Hlaváčová =

Czech swimmer (born 1975)

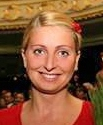

Personal information
- Nationality: Czech
- Born: 26 May 1975 (age 51) Boskovice, Czechoslovakia
- Occupation(s): Swimmer, fashion model
- Height: 1.94 m (6 ft 4 in)
- Weight: 79 kg (174 lb)
Medal record
Women's swimming
Representing Czechoslovakia
European Championships
Silver medal – second place	1991 Athens	5 km open water
Representing Czech Republic
European Championships
Bronze medal – third place	1995 Vienna	25 km open water

Yvette Tulip Hlaváčová (also known as Yvetta Hlaváčová; born 26 May 1975) is a Czech former swimmer.

== Swimming career ==
Hlaváčová was a Czech national team member in long-distance swimming and won a silver medal at the 1991 European Aquatics Championships in the 5 km open water and a bronze medal at the 1995 European Aquatics Championships in the 25 km open water event.

Despite being of Czech nationality she won the 50 metres butterfly title in 1998 at the ASA National British Championships.

She broke the Czech record for swimming the English Channel in 2005, completing the journey in 8 hours and 42 minutes. She later completed the crossing in a time of 7 hours, 25 minutes, setting the women's world record in the process. While she has pursued indoor swimming, she has earned much more success on the open water. The swimmer has been at the top of long-distance swimming for several years.

At 1.94 metres (6 ft 4 in), she is one of the tallest swimmers in the world. Her feet are a size 13 (US) / 46 (EU).

== Successful English Channel Swims ==
- 2005 in 8 h 42 mins
- 2006 in 7 h 25 mins (WR)
- 2007 in 7 h 53 mins
