= European Open Water Swimming Championships =

Swimming event of LEN

- Status: active
- Genre: sporting event
- Date: mid-year
- Frequency: biannual
- Country: varying
- Inaugurated: 1989

The European Open Water Swimming Championships are an event organized by LEN (Ligue Européenne de Natation), dedicated to open water swimming competitions. The event was held biennially from 1989 to 1993; since 1995 the open water swimming has been included in the program of the European Swimming Championships.

== Editions ==
Ten editions was part of the European Aquatics Championships, and seven edition was stand alone editions.

part of the European Aquatics Championships
stand alone edition

Edition	Year	Venue	Country
1st	1989	Stari Grad	Yugoslavia
2nd	1991	Terracina	Italy
3rd	1993	Slapy	Czech Republic
4th	1995	Vienna	Austria
5th	1997	Sevilla	Spain
6th	1999	Istanbul	Turkey
7th	2000	Helsinki	Finland
8th	2002	Berlín	Germany
9th	2004	Madrid	Spain
10th	2006	Budapest	Hungary
11th	2008	Dubrovnik	Croatia
12th	2010	Budapest	Hungary
13th	2011	Eilat	Israel
14th	2012	Piombino	Italy
15th	2014	Berlín	Germany
16th	2016	Hoorn	Netherlands
17th	2018	Glasgow	United Kingdom
18th	2020	Budapest	Hungary
19th	2022	Rome	Italy
20th	2024	Belgrade	Serbia
21st	2025	Stari Grad	Croatia

== Medal table ==
Update to 2018 European Aquatics Championships.

Rank	Nation	Gold	Silver	Bronze	Total
1	Italy	26	17	24	67
2	Germany	18	24	18	60
3	Russia	16	15	8	39
4	Netherlands	11	9	6	26
5	France	6	6	12	24
6	Hungary	6	4	4	14
7	Yugoslavia	3	1	2	6
8	Greece	2	4	2	8
9	Great Britain	2	2	1	5
10	Spain	1	5	4	10
11	Czech Republic	1	4	9	14
12	Switzerland	1	2	1	4
13	Bulgaria	1	1	2	4
14	Belgium	1	0	1	2
14	Ukraine	1	0	1	2
16	Portugal	0	1	0	1
17	Israel	0	0	1	1
Totals (17 entries)		96	95	96	287

== See also ==
- LEN European Aquatics Championships
- List of medalists at the European Open Water Swimming Championships
