= Arseniy Lavrentyev =

Russian-born Portuguese swimmer

Personal information
- Born: February 1, 1983 (age 43)

Sport
- Sport: Swimming

Arseniy Lavrentyev (Russian: Арсений Лаврентьев, born 1 February 1983) is a Russian-born Portuguese professional swimmer, specialising in Open water swimming. He competed at the 2008 and 2012 Summer Olympics.
