= Pepijn Smits =

Dutch swimmer

Personal information
- Full name: Pepijn Maxime Smits
- Nationality: Dutch
- Born: 9 December 1996 (age 29)

Sport
- Sport: Swimming
- Strokes: Open water swimming
Medal record
European Championships
Gold medal – first place	2018 Glasgow	Team event

Pepijn Maxime Smits (born 9 December 1996) is a Dutch swimmer.

He competed in the Team event at the 2018 European Aquatics Championships, winning the gold medal.
