= Simone Ercoli (swimmer) =

Italian swimmer

Personal information
- Nationality: Italy
- Born: 5 May 1979 (age 47) Castelfiorentino, Italy

Sport
- Sport: Swimming
- Strokes: Open Water
Medal record
World Championships
Bronze medal – third place	Montréal 2005	5K
Open Water Worlds
Silver medal – second place	Sharm el-Sheik 2002	10K
Bronze medal – third place	Napoli 2006	5K
Short Course Words (25m)
Silver medal – second place	Indianapolis 2004	1500m free
European Championships
Silver medal – second place	Budapest 2010	5K
Bronze medal – third place	Budapest 2006	5K

Simone Ercoli (born 5 May 1979 in Castelfiorentino, Italy) is an Italian male open water swimmer.

Ercoli is an athlete of the Gruppo Sportivo Fiamme Oro. He has swum for Italy at the:

- World Championships: 2003, 2005, 2007, 2009
- Open Water Worlds: 2000, 2002, 2004, 2006
- European Championships: 2000, 2002, 2006, 2010
