= Rita Kovács =

Hungarian swimmer (born 1970)

Medal record

Women's Swimming

Representing Hungary

World Championships
Silver medal – second place	1994 Rome	25 km open water

European Championships
Gold medal – first place	1995 Vienna	5 km open water
Gold medal – first place	1997 Seville	25 km open water
Silver medal – second place	2006 Budapest	10 km open water
Bronze medal – third place	1991 Terracina	25 km open water
Bronze medal – third place	1997 Seville	5 km open water

European Junior Championships (LC)
Bronze medal – third place	1985 Geneva	800 m freestlye

17times world cup championship Rita Kovács (born 29 March 1970 in Nyíregyháza) is a former long-distance swimmer from Hungary. She represented her home country at the 1996 Summer Olympics in 800 metre freestyle. She also competed in open water swimming, winning several medals. She started her career in a local sportclub, called NYVSSC (Nyíregyházi Vasutas Spartacus Sport Club).
