= Jana Pechanová =

Czech swimmer (born 1981)

Personal information
- Nationality: Czech Republic
- Born: 3 March 1981 (age 45) Rakovník, Czechoslovakia

Sport
- Sport: Swimming
- Strokes: Freestyle
Medal record
World Championships
Silver medal – second place	2003 Barcelona	5 km open water
European Championships
Bronze medal – third place	2000 Helsinki	5 km open water
Bronze medal – third place	2006 Budapest	5 km open water
Bronze medal – third place	2006 Budapest	10 km open water
European Championships (SC)
Silver medal – second place	2000 Valencia	400 m freestyle
Bronze medal – third place	2000 Valencia	800 m freestyle
Universiade
Silver medal – second place	Mallorca 1999	400 free
Silver medal – second place	Mallorca 1999	800 free
Silver medal – second place	Beijing 2001	800 free
Bronze medal – third place	Beijing 2001	1500 free

Jana Pechanová (Czech pronunciation: [ˈjana ˈpɛxanovaː]; born 3 March 1981 in Rakovník, Czechoslovakia) is an Olympic distance swimmer from the Czech Republic. She swam for the Czech Olympic team at the 2004, 2008, 2012 and 2016.

At the 2004 Summer Olympics, she in 19th in the 10 km open water marathon. At the 2008 Summer Olympics, Pechanová finished 8th in 10 km distance. At the 2012 Summer Olympics, she finished 9th in the same event.
