= Martina Grimaldi =

Italian swimmer

Personal information
- Nationality: Italian
- Born: 28 September 1988 (age 38) Bologna, Italy
- Height: 1.72 m (5 ft 7 1/2 in)
- Weight: 65 kg (143 lb)

Sport
- Country: Italy
- Sport: Swimming
- Club: G.S. Fiamme Oro
Medal record
Olympic Games
Bronze medal – third place	2012 London	Marathon 10 km
World Championships
Gold medal – first place	2013 Barcelona	Marathon 25 km
Silver medal – second place	2011 Shanghai	Marathon 10 km
Bronze medal – third place	2009 Rome	Marathon 10 km
World Open Water Championships
Gold medal – first place	2010 Roberval	Marathon 10 km
European Championships
Gold medal – first place	2011 Eilat	10 km open water
Gold medal – first place	2012 Piombino	10 km open water
Gold medal – first place	2014 Berlin	Marathon 25 km
Gold medal – first place	2016 Hoorn	25 km open water
Silver medal – second place	2008 Dubrovnik	Marathon 10 km
Bronze medal – third place	2010 Budapest	Marathon 25 km
Bronze medal – third place	2012 Piombino	25 km open water

Martina Grimaldi (born 28 September 1988) is an Italian distance swimmer. She was born in Bologna. At the 2012 Summer Olympics, she competed in the Women's marathon 10 kilometre, winning the bronze medal.

Grimaldi is an athlete of the Gruppo Sportivo Fiamme Oro.
