= Angela Maurer =

German swimmer (born 1975)

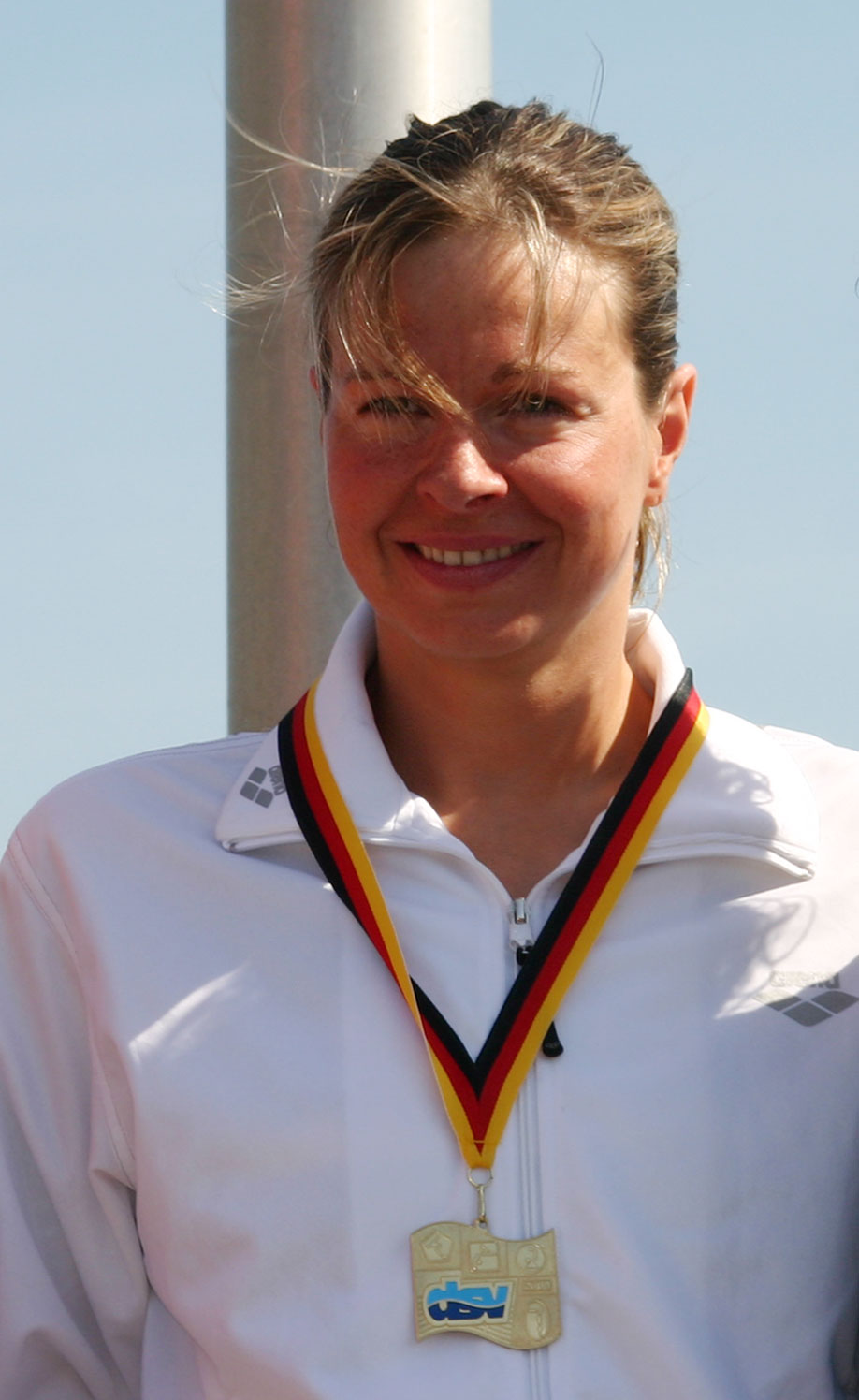
- Maurer on the winner's podium at the German national championships, Lindau

Personal information
- Born: 27 July 1975 (age 50) Wiesbaden, West Germany

Sport
- Sport: Swimming
Medal record
Women's swimming
Representing Germany
World Championships
Gold medal – first place	2006 Napoli	25 km open water
Gold medal – first place	2009 Rome	25 km open water
Silver medal – second place	2003 Barcelona	10 km open water
Silver medal – second place	2011 Shanghai	25 km open water
Silver medal – second place	2013 Barcelona	25 km open water
Bronze medal – third place	2001 Fukuoka	25 km open water
Bronze medal – third place	2003 Barcelona	25 km open water
Bronze medal – third place	2013 Barcelona	10 km open water
Bronze medal – third place	2015 Kazan	25 km open water
European Championships
Gold medal – first place	2006 Budapest	10 km open water
Gold medal – first place	2006 Budapest	25 km open water
Silver medal – second place	1999 Istanbul	25 km open water
Silver medal – second place	2002 Berlin	10 km open water
Silver medal – second place	2010 Budapest	Marathon 25 km
Silver medal – second place	2012 Piombino	10 km open water
Bronze medal – third place	2004 Madrid	10 km open water
Bronze medal – third place	2010 Balatonfüred	10 km open water
Bronze medal – third place	2012 Piombino	5 km team
Bronze medal – third place	2014 Berlin	25 km open water

Angela Maurer (born 27 July 1975) is a German long-distance swimmer.

== Career ==
Angela Maurer lives in Wiesbaden, where she was born. She swims for the SSV Undine 08 e.V. Mainz swimming club, and trains together with Dimitri Colupaev and Marc-Oliver Stein under Nikolai Evseev in Mainz.

She has been studying at police technical college since 1 September 2007, and is a member of the Rhineland-Palatinate's state elite sports training programme. At the 2008 Summer Olympics in Beijing she achieved 4th place in the 10 km marathon swim, only a fraction of a second behind the bronze medallist Cassie Patten.

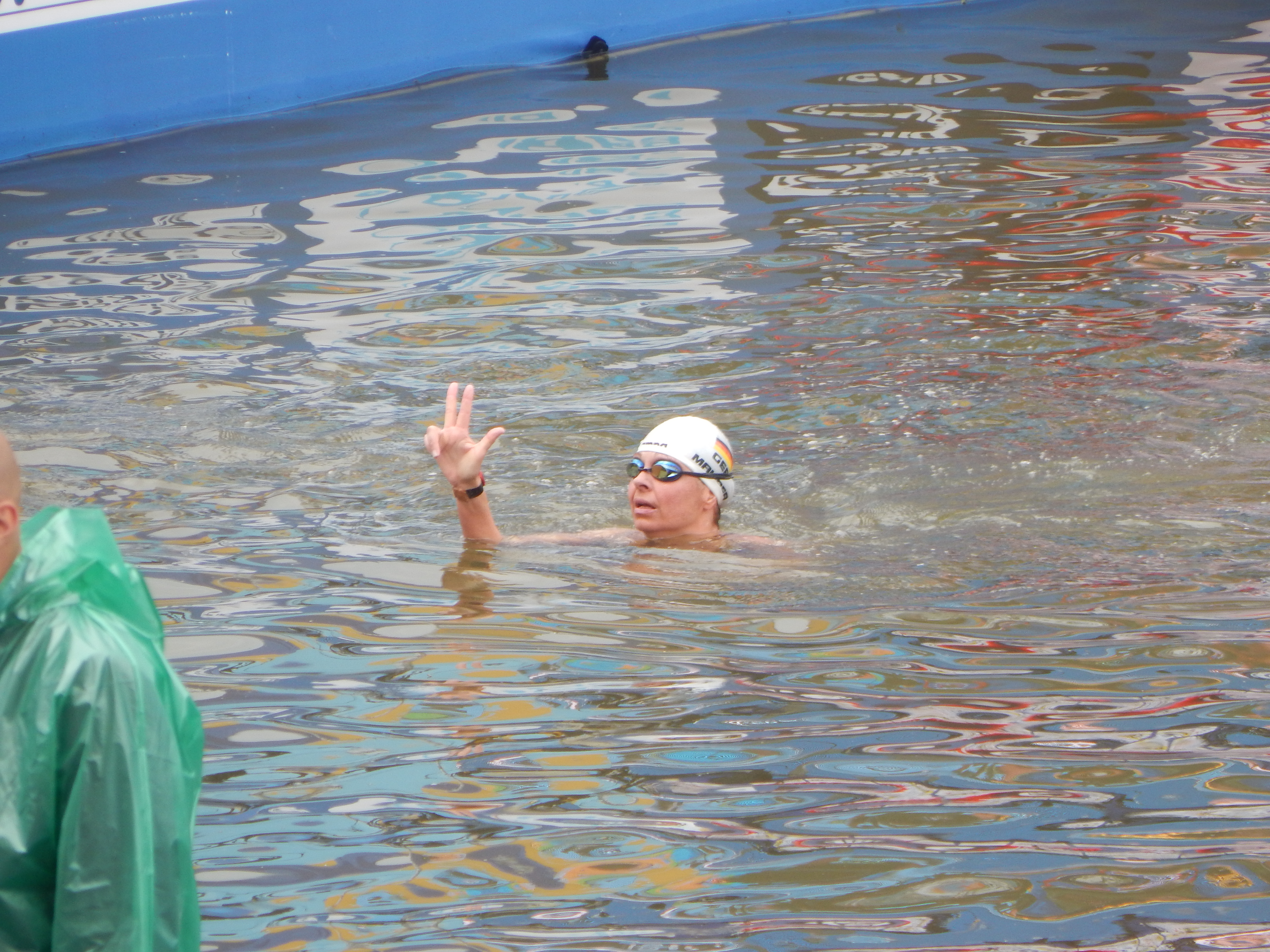
25km race in Kazan 2015

In 2009, she won the 10 km open-water race at the German national swimming championships in Lindau with a time of 2:01:31.43, ensuring her place at the 2009 World Aquatics Championships in Rome.

== Achievements ==
- Qualifying for the 2008 Olympics at the 5th World Open Water Championships in Seville
- 8 German national titles in 5 km, 10 km und 25 km open-water swimming
- double 2006 European champion in both 10 km und 25 km open-water swimming, runner-up in 1999 and 2002
- seven World Championship medals in 10 km und 25 km open-water swimming (one gold, three silver, three bronze)
- Overall winner of the 2002 World Cup in open-water swimming
- Hesse Sportswoman of the Year
- Member of the International Marathon Swimming Hall of Fame
