= Rob Muffels =

German swimmer

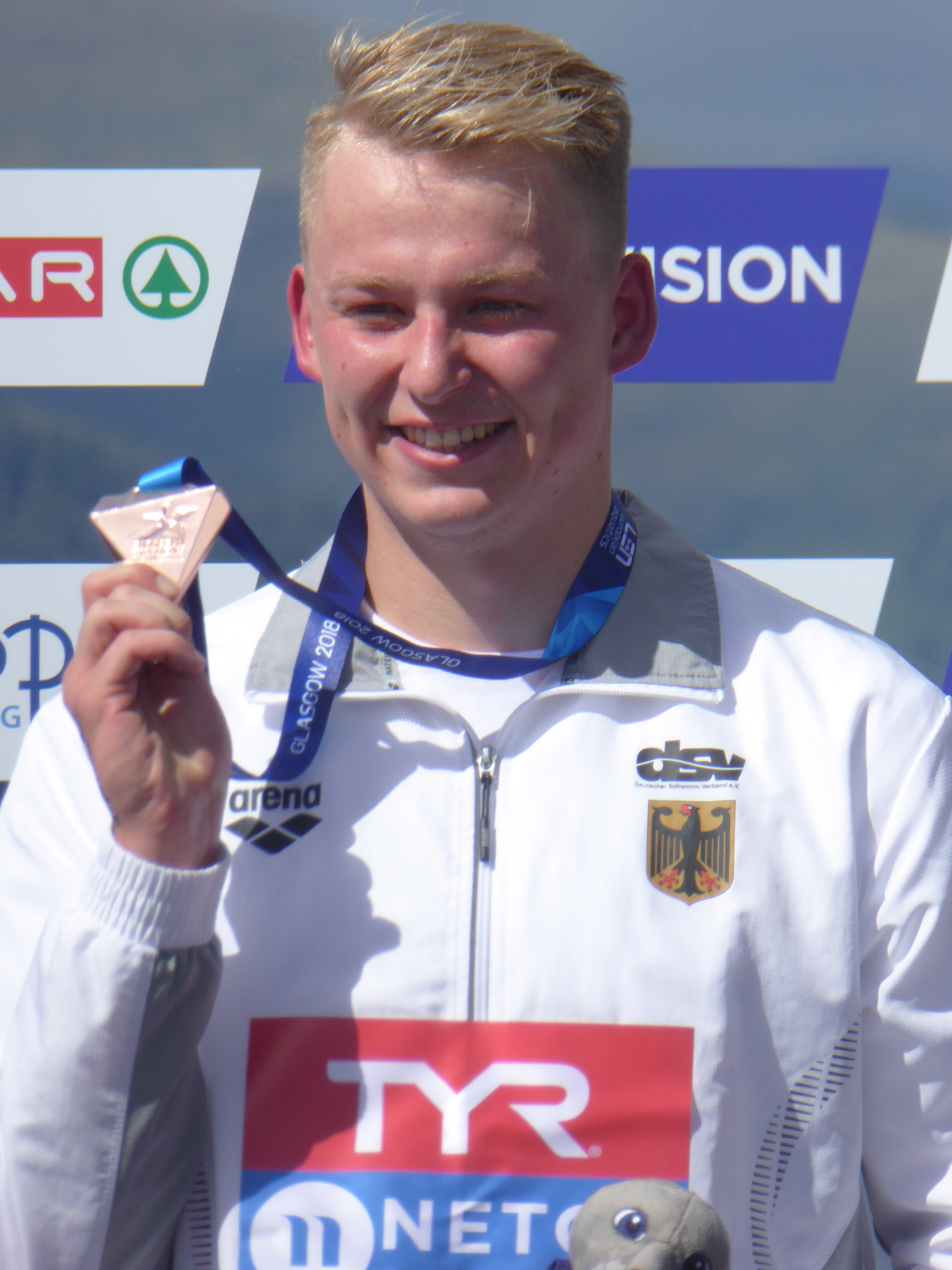
- Rob Muffels at the 2018 European Aquatics Championships at Loch Lomond.

Personal information
- Nationality: German
- Born: 8 December 1994 (age 31)
- Height: 1.87 m (6 ft 2 in)

Sport
- Sport: Swimming
- Strokes: Open water swimming
- Club: SC Magdeburg
Medal record
World Championships (LC)
Gold medal – first place	2019 Gwangju	Team event
Bronze medal – third place	2019 Gwangju	10 km open water
European Championships
Bronze medal – third place	2018 Glasgow	10 km open water
Silver medal – second place	2020 Budapest	Team relay

Rob Muffels (born 8 December 1994) is a German swimmer.

He competed in the 10 km open water event at the 2018 European Aquatics Championships, winning the bronze medal.
