= Open water swimming at the 2015 World Aquatics Championships – Team =

Open water swimming team event at the 2015 World Aquatics Championships
- Location: Kazanka River, Kazan
- Dates: 30 July
- Competitors: 66 from 22 nations
- Winning time: 55:14.4

Medalists
gold medal	Rob Muffels; Christian Reichert; Isabelle Härle	Germany
silver medal	Allan do Carmo; Diogo Villarinho; Ana Marcela Cunha	Brazil
silver medal	Marcel Schouten; Ferry Weertman; Sharon van Rouwendaal	Netherlands

The open water swimming team event at the 2015 World Aquatics Championships was held on 30 July 2015 in the Kazanka River, Kazan, Russia.

Germany won gold with a time of 55:14.4, and Brazil and the Netherlands tying for silver with a time of 55:31.2.

== Event description ==
Each country was represented by three swimmers who swam as a team. Each team swam the same 5-kilometer course, with each member of the team starting at the same time. The time it took the last member of the team to complete the course determined the team's time, which determined the finishing positions as in a time trial. A staggered start was implemented, meaning each team was set off individually thirty seconds after the previous team.

== Qualification ==
Each FINA member federation could enter one team into the event. That team had to consist entirely of swimmers who were also entered into individual events at the Championships. Teams were also required to contain at least one man and one woman.

== Results ==
The race started at 12:00 MSK on 30 July. It took place in the Kazanka River, Kazan, Russia.

Swimmers swam close to their teammates to take advantage of drafting effects. Germany won gold, defending their title with a time of 55:14.4. There was an issue with Brazil's timing chip, meaning the officials convened for ten minutes after the race to calculate their time. Brazil and the Netherlands tied for second, both swimming a time of 55:31.2.

Germans Isabelle Härle and Christian Reichert were also part of the team that won the event in 2013, meaning they won a gold medal in this event in two consecutive championships.

The World Open Water Swimming Association called the closeness of the race "remarkable", as Brazilians Allan do Carmo and Ana Marcela Cunha, and the Netherlands' Ferry Weertman and Sharon van Rouwendaal all swam exactly the same time of 55:31.2. Due to the tie, it was the first event of this championships where no bronze medal was awarded.

Results
Rank	Nation	Swimmers	Time
1st place, gold medalist(s)	Germany	Isabelle Härle; Rob Muffels; Christian Reichert	55:14.4
2nd place, silver medalist(s)	Brazil	Ana Marcela Cunha; Allan do Carmo; Diogo Villarinho	55:31.2
2nd place, silver medalist(s)	Netherlands	Marcel Schouten; Sharon van Rouwendaal; Ferry Weertman	55:31.2
4	Italy	Rachele Bruni; Simone Ercoli; Federico Vanelli	55:49.4
5	United States	Sean Ryan; Ashley Twichell; Jordan Wilimovsky	55:50.6
6	Australia	Melissa Gorman; Simon Huitenga; Jarrod Poort	56:07.4
7	Hungary	Gergely Gyurta; Éva Risztov; Dániel Székelyi	56:08.4
8	Greece	Kalliopi Araouzou; Antonios Fokaidis; Spyridon Gianniotis	56:18.6
9	Ecuador	Samantha Arévalo; Esteban Enderica; Ivan Enderica Ochoa	56:45.9
10	Russia	Sergey Bolshakov; Anastasiia Krapivina; Daniil Serebrennikov	56:47.0
11	France	David Aubry; Aurélie Muller; Marc-Antoine Olivier	56:50.9
12	Spain	Antonio Arroyo; Héctor Ruiz; Erika Villaécija	57:16.0
13	Argentina	Guillermo Bertola; Cecilia Biagioli; Gabriel Villagoiz	57:27.8
14	China	Qiao Zhongyi; Yan Siyu; Zu Lijun	57:53.9
15	Portugal	Angélica André; Vasco Gaspar; Rafael Gil	58:12.6
16	Venezuela	Wilder Carreño; Erwin Maldonado; Paola Pérez	58:39.3
17	Czech Republic	Alena Benešová; Matěj Kozubek; Ján Kútnik	59:43.1
18	South Africa	Chad Ho; Nico Manoussakis; Michelle Weber	1:00:31.2
19	Mexico	Zaira Cardenas; Daniel Delgadillo; Arturo Pérez Vertti	1:01:36.6
20	Kazakhstan	Kenessary Kenenbayev; Vitaliy Khudyakov; Xeniya Romanchuk	1:02:12.7
21	Egypt	Youssef Hossameldeen; Reem Kaseem; Adel Ragab	1:02:13.1
22	Hong Kong	Kwan Ho Yin; Kwok Cho Yiu; Tse Tsz Fung	1:05:43.8

== Further information ==
- Rob Muffels: Winner of Mixed 5 km Team Event in Kazan (RUS) (Video). World Aquatics. 30 July 2015 – via YouTube. – Interview with Rob Muffels, part of the German winning team
- Munatones, Steven (30 July 2015). "Germany Takes 5 km Team Pursuit Title". World Open Water Swimming Association. Archived from the original on 12 October 2025. – Some quotes from the competitors after the race
- Munatones, Steven (8 August 2015). "German Efficiency And Speed Win Team Pursuit". World Open Water Swimming Association. Archived from the original on 8 February 2023. – Further quotes from competitors
