= Open water swimming at the 2015 World Aquatics Championships – Women's 10 km =

Women's 10 km at the 2015 World Aquatics Championships
- Dates: 28 July
- Competitors: 55 from 34 nations
- Winning time: 1:58:04.3

Medalists
gold medal	Aurélie Muller	France
silver medal	Sharon van Rouwendaal	Netherlands
bronze medal	Ana Marcela Cunha	Brazil

The Women's 10 km competition of the open water swimming events at the 2015 World Aquatics Championships was held on 28 July 2015.

== Results ==
The race was started at 12:00.

Rank	Swimmer	Nationality	Time
1st place, gold medalist(s)	Aurélie Muller	France	1:58:04.3
2nd place, silver medalist(s)	Sharon van Rouwendaal	Netherlands	1:58:06.7
3rd place, bronze medalist(s)	Ana Marcela Cunha	Brazil	1:58:26.5
4	Rachele Bruni	Italy	1:58:27.9
5	Anastasiya Krapyvina	Russia	1:58:28.6
6	Poliana Okimoto	Brazil	1:58:28.8
7	Isabelle Härle	Germany	1:58:30.0
8	Kalliopi Araouzou	Greece	1:58:30.6
9	Haley Anderson	United States	1:58:35.9
10	Éva Risztov	Hungary	1:58:36.4
11	Anna Olasz	Hungary	1:58:40.0
12	Samantha Arévalo	Ecuador	1:58:46.9
13	Chelsea Gubecka	Australia	1:58:51.3
14	Becca Mann	United States	1:58:51.9
15	Keri-Anne Payne	Great Britain	1:58:53.6
16	Coralie Codevelle	France	1:58:53.8
17	Cecilia Biagioli	Argentina	1:58:55.7
18	Shi Yu	China	1:59:28.6
19	Michelle Weber	South Africa	1:59:28.7
20	Kareena Lee	Australia	1:59:32.8
21	Erika Villaécija	Spain	1:59:33.8
22	Aurora Ponsele	Italy	1:59:33.9
23	Angela Maurer	Germany	1:59:35.5
24	María Vilas	Spain	1:59:38.2
25	Špela Perše	Slovenia	1:59:38.3
26	Yan Siyu	China	1:59:39.9
27	Samantha Harding	Canada	1:59:47.1
28	Yumi Kida	Japan	2:00:01.8
29	Zaira Cardenas	Mexico	2:00:07.9
30	Alena Benešová	Czech Republic	2:00:12.4
31	Montserrat Ortuño	Mexico	2:00:12.8
32	Julia Arino	Argentina	2:00:31.2
33	Heidi Gan	Malaysia	2:00:34.4
34	Jade Dusablon	Canada	2:00:35.0
35	Danielle Huskisson	Great Britain	2:00:57.3
36	Nataly Caldas	Ecuador	2:01:05.8
37	Marianna Lymperta	Greece	2:01:08.5
38	Angelica María	Portugal	2:01:40.4
39	Paola Pérez	Venezuela	2:05:31.5
40	Anastasiia Azarova	Russia	2:05:59.4
41	Carmen Le Roux	South Africa	2:06:37.5
42	Liliana Hernández	Venezuela	2:07:13.0
43	Reem Kaseem	Egypt	2:09:22.3
44	Fatima Flores	El Salvador	2:12:38.9
45	Charlotte Webby	New Zealand	2:12:41.7
46	Toscano Cindy	Guatemala	2:16:15.8
47	Xeniya Romanchuk	Kazakhstan	2:16:23.8
48	Lok Hoi Man	Hong Kong	2:20:13.2
49	Angelica Astorga	Costa Rica	2:20:39.4
50	Mariya Ivanova	Kazakhstan	2:20:44.9
51	Kwok Cho Yiu	Hong Kong	2:22:19.9
	Alondra Castillo	Bolivia	OTL
	Mariam Sakr	Egypt	OTL
	Nikita Prabhu	India	DNF
	Karla Šitić	Croatia	DNF
	Ressa Dewi	Indonesia	DNS
	Ellen Olsson	Sweden	DNS
