= Open water swimming at the 2014 European Aquatics Championships – Women's 10 km =

Women's 10 km at the Open water swimming at the 2014 European Aquatics Championships
- Dates: 14 August
- Competitors: 30 from 14 nations
- Winning time: 1:56:06.9

Medalists
gold medal	Sharon van Rouwendaal	Netherlands
silver medal	Éva Risztov	Hungary
bronze medal	Aurora Ponselé	Italy

The Women's 10 km competition of the 2014 European Aquatics Championships was held on 13 August.

== Results ==
The race was started at 10:00.

Rank	Swimmer	Nationality	Time
1st place, gold medalist(s)	Sharon van Rouwendaal	Netherlands	1:56:06.9
2nd place, silver medalist(s)	Éva Risztov	Hungary	1:56:08.0
3rd place, bronze medalist(s)	Aurora Ponselé	Italy	1:56:08.5
4	Aurélie Muller	France	1:56:09.2
5	Anna Olasz	Hungary	1:56:10.7
6	Rachele Bruni	Italy	1:56:11.9
7	Erika Villaécija García	Spain	1:56:14.7
8	Kalliopi Araouzou	Greece	1:56:16.1
9	Coralie Codevelle	France	1:56:18.3
10	Martina Grimaldi	Italy	1:56:21.9
11	Anastasiia Krapivina	Russia	2:00:36.8
12	Elizaveta Gorshkova	Russia	2:00:39.0
13	Angela Maurer	Germany	2:00:40.4
14	Finnia Wunram	Germany	2:00:41.2
15	Nikolett Szilágyi	Hungary	2:00:45.8
16	Angelica Andre	Portugal	2:00:47.6
17	Svenja Zihsler	Germany	2:00:48.6
18	Margarita Domínguez	Spain	2:00:53.1
19	Anastasia Azarova	Russia	2:02:02.8
20	Luisa Mar Morales	Spain	2:02:52.8
21	Danielle Huskisson	Great Britain	2:03:01.9
22	Karla Šitić	Croatia	2:03:03.4
23	Morgane Rothon	France	2:03:57.7
24	Silvie Rybářová	Czech Republic	2:03:57.5
25	Kseniya Skrypel	Ukraine	2:04:02.6
26	Lauren Walton	Great Britain	2:04:55.6
27	Barbora Picková	Czech Republic	2:06:55.4
28	Lenka Štěrbová	Czech Republic	2:10:49.4
—	Joanna Zachoszcz	Poland	DNF
—	Natalia Charłos	Poland	DNF
