= Open water swimming at the 2015 World Aquatics Championships =

- Host city: (Russia) Kazan
- Date(s): 25 July – 1 August
- Venue(s): Kazanka river bank near the Kazan Kremlin
- Events: 7

Open water swimming at the 2015 World Aquatics Championships was held between 25 July and 1 August 2015 in Kazan, Russia.

== Events ==
The following events were contested by both men and women in Kazan:

- 5 km
- 10 km
- 25 km

In addition, there was a team competition with male and female competitors.

== Schedule ==
Seven events were held.

All time are local (UTC+3).

Date	Time	Event
25 July 2015	10:00	Women's 5 km
25 July 2015	13:00	Men's 5 km
27 July 2015	12:00	Men's 10 km
28 July 2015	12:00	Women's 10 km
30 July 2015	12:00	5 km team
1 August 2015	08:00	Men's 25 km
1 August 2015	08:15	Women's 25 km

== Medal summary ==
=== Medal table ===
Rank	Nation	Gold	Silver	Bronze	Total
1	United States	2	1	0	3
2	Germany	1	1	2	4
3	Brazil	1	1	1	3
4	Italy	1	0	2	3
5	France	1	0	0	1
5	South Africa	1	0	0	1
7	Netherlands	0	3	0	3
8	Greece	0	1	1	2
9	Hungary	0	1	0	1
Totals (9 entries)		7	8	6	21

=== Men ===
Event	Gold		Silver		Bronze	
5 km	Chad Ho; South Africa	55:17.6	Rob Muffels; Germany	55:17.6	Matteo Furlan; Italy	55:20.0
10 km	Jordan Wilimovsky; United States	1:49:48.2	Ferry Weertman; Netherlands	1:50:00.3	Spyridon Gianniotis; Greece	1:50:00.7
25 km	Simone Ruffini; Italy	4:53:10.7	Alex Meyer; United States	4:53:15.1	Matteo Furlan; Italy	4:54:38.0

=== Women ===
Event	Gold		Silver		Bronze	
5 km	Haley Anderson; United States	58:48.4	Kalliopi Araouzou; Greece	58:49.8	Finnia Wunram; Germany	58:51.0
10 km	Aurélie Muller; France	1:58:04.3	Sharon van Rouwendaal; Netherlands	1:58:06.7	Ana Marcela Cunha; Brazil	1:58:26.5
25 km	Ana Marcela Cunha; Brazil	5:13:47.3	Anna Olasz; Hungary	5:14:13.4	Angela Maurer; Germany	5:15:07.6

=== Team ===
Event	Gold		Silver		Bronze
Team	Germany; Rob Muffels; Christian Reichert; Isabelle Härle	55:14.4	Brazil; Allan do Carmo; Diogo Villarinho; Ana Marcela Cunha	55:31.2	Not awarded
Team	Germany; Rob Muffels; Christian Reichert; Isabelle Härle	55:14.4	Netherlands; Marcel Schouten; Ferry Weertman; Sharon van Rouwendaal	55:31.2	Not awarded
