= Greece at the 2015 World Aquatics Championships =

- Flag of Greece
- World Aquatics code: GRE
- National federation: Hellenic Swimming Federation
- Website: www.koe.org.gr

in Kazan, Russia
- Competitors: 57 in 5 sports
- Medals Ranked 22nd: Gold 0 Silver 1 Bronze 2 Total 3

World Aquatics Championships appearances
- 1973; 1975; 1978; 1982; 1986; 1991; 1994; 1998; 2001; 2003; 2005; 2007; 2009; 2011; 2013; 2015; 2017; 2019; 2022; 2023; 2024; 2025

Greece competed at the 2015 World Aquatics Championships in Kazan, Russia from 24 July to 9 August 2015.

== Medalists ==
Medal	Name	Sport	Event	Date
Silver	Kalliopi Araouzou	Open water swimming	Women's 5 km	July 25
Bronze	Spyridon Gianniotis	Open water swimming	Men's 10 km	July 27
Bronze	Greece men's national water polo team: Christos Afroudakis; Evangelos Delakas; Georgios Dervisis; Konstantinos Flegkas; Ioannis Fountoulis; Stefanos Galanopoulos; Konstantinos Genidounias; Alexandros Gounas; Christodoulos Kolomvos; Konstantinos Mourikis; Emmanouil Mylonakis; Kyriakos Pontikeas; Angelos Vlachopoulos	Water polo	Men's tournament	August 8

== Diving ==
Greek divers qualified for the individual spots at the World Championships.

Men

Athlete	Event	Preliminaries		Semifinals		Final	
Athlete	Event	Points	Rank	Points	Rank	Points	Rank
Stefanos Paparounas	3 m springboard	340.90	42	did not advance			

Women

Athlete	Event	Preliminaries		Semifinals		Final	
Athlete	Event	Points	Rank	Points	Rank	Points	Rank
Eleni Katsouli	3 m springboard	232.45	37	did not advance			

== Open water swimming ==
Greece has nominated four swimmers to compete in the open water marathon. Among the official roster featured four-time Olympians Marianna Lymperta and defending World champion Spyridon Gianniotis in the 10 km open water.

Athlete	Event	Time	Rank
Antonios Fokaidis	Men's 5 km	55:33.6	27
Antonios Fokaidis	Men's 10 km	1:51:27.3	29
Spyridon Gianniotis	Men's 10 km	1:50:00.7	3rd place, bronze medalist(s)
Kalliopi Araouzou	Women's 5 km	58:49.8	2nd place, silver medalist(s)
Kalliopi Araouzou	Women's 10 km	1:58:30.6	8
Marianna Lymperta	Women's 10 km	2:01:08.5	37
Kalliopi Araouzou; Antonios Fokaidis; Spyridon Gianniotis	Mixed team	56:18.6	8

== Swimming ==
Greek swimmers have achieved qualifying standards in the following events (up to a maximum of 2 swimmers in each event at the A-standard entry time, and 1 at the B-standard):

Men

Athlete	Event	Heat		Semifinal		Final	
Athlete	Event	Time	Rank	Time	Rank	Time	Rank
Apostolos Christou	50 m backstroke	25.50	24	did not advance			
Apostolos Christou	100 m backstroke	55.10	31	did not advance			
Apostolos Christou	200 m backstroke	DNS		did not advance			
Stefanos Dimitriadis	200 m butterfly	1:56.23	10 Q	1:56.31	11	did not advance	
Kristian Golomeev	50 m freestyle	21.87	3 Q	21.89	6 Q	21.98	7
Kristian Golomeev	100 m freestyle	49.12	=20	did not advance			
Kristian Golomeev	50 m butterfly	23.96	24	did not advance			
Ioannis Karpouzlis	50 m breaststroke	27.85	21	did not advance			
Christos Katranzis	200 m freestyle	1:51.01	48	did not advance			
Odysseus Meladinis	50 m freestyle	22.47	16 Q	22.14	13	did not advance	
Odysseus Meladinis	100 m freestyle	49.47	26	did not advance			
Panagiotis Samilidis	100 m breaststroke	1:02.58	43	did not advance			
Panagiotis Samilidis	200 m breaststroke	2:14.24	28	did not advance			
Andreas Vazaios	100 m butterfly	52.89	=27	did not advance			
Andreas Vazaios	200 m individual medley	1:58.92	5 Q	1:59.53	13	did not advance	
Odysseus Meladinis; Kristian Golomeev; Christos Katranzis; Andreas Vazaios	4 × 100 m freestyle relay	3:16.83	14	—N/a		did not advance	
Apostolos Christou; Kristian Golomeev; Panagiotis Samilidis; Andreas Vazaios	4 × 100 m medley relay	3:37.86	14	—N/a		did not advance	

Women

Athlete	Event	Heat		Semifinal		Final	
Athlete	Event	Time	Rank	Time	Rank	Time	Rank
Theodora Drakou	50 m freestyle	25.22	=19	did not advance			
Theodora Drakou	50 m backstroke	28.35	12 Q	28.01	8 Q	28.17	8
Theodora Drakou	100 m backstroke	1:01.15	25	did not advance			
Theodora Giareni	100 m freestyle	56.24	38	did not advance			
Theodora Giareni	200 m freestyle	2:01.00	33	did not advance			
Anna Ntountounaki	50 m butterfly	26.85	25	did not advance			
Anna Ntountounaki	100 m butterfly	58.90	23	did not advance			
Aikaterini Sarakatsani	50 m breaststroke	31.58	25	did not advance			
Aikaterini Sarakatsani	100 m breaststroke	1:10.68	38	did not advance			
Theodora Drakou; Theodora Giareni; Anna Ntountounaki; Aikaterini Sarakatsani	4 × 100 m medley relay	4:04.29	17	—N/a		did not advance	

== Synchronized swimming ==
Greece fielded a full team of twelve synchronized swimmers to compete in each of the following events.

Women

Athlete	Event	Preliminaries		Final	
Athlete	Event	Points	Rank	Points	Rank
Evangelia Platanioti	Solo technical routine	84.9694	8 Q	85.3727	8
Evangelia Platanioti	Solo free routine	86.7000	9 Q	86.3333	10
Evangelia Koutidi; Evangelia Platanioti	Duet technical routine	84.1564	9 Q	85.3878	8
Evangelia Papazoglou; Evangelia Platanioti	Duet free routine	84.8000	10 Q	85.8333	9
Maria Alzigkouzi; Ifigeneia Dipla*; Valentina Farantouri*; Giana Gkeorgkieva; Evangelia Koutidi; Sofia Malkogeorgou; Evangelia Papazoglou; Evangelia Platanioti; Anna Maria Taxopoulou; Athanasia Tsola	Team technical routine	83.6782	11 Q	82.3897	12
Maria Alzigkouzi; Ifigeneia Dipla*; Valentina Farantouri*; Giana Gkeorgkieva; Evangelia Koutidi; Sofia Malkogeorgou; Evangelia Papazoglou; Evangelia Platanioti; Anna Maria Taxopoulou; Athanasia Tsola	Team free routine	85.5667	10 Q	85.8333	10
Maria Alzigkouzi; Maria Eleni Armaou*; Ifigeneia Dipla; Valentina Farantouri; Giana Gkeorgkieva; Evangelia Koutidi; Sofia Malkogeorgou; Evangelia Papazoglou; Evangelia Platanioti; Anna Maria Taxopoulou; Anastasia Taxopoulou; Athanasia Tsola	Free routine combination	86.6333	8 Q	86.6667	8

== Water polo ==
=== Men's tournament ===
Team roster

- Konstantinos Flegkas
- Emmanouil Mylonakis
- Georgios Dervisis
- Konstantinos Genidounias
- Ioannis Fountoulis
- Kyriakos Pontikeas
- Christos Afroudakis
- Evangelos Delakas
- Konstantinos Mourikis
- Christodoulos Kolomvos
- Alexandros Gounas
- Angelos Vlachopoulos
- Stefanos Galanopoulos

Group play

Pos	Team	Pld	W	D	L	GF	GA	GD	Pts	Qualification
1	Greece	3	3	0	0	37	31	+6	6	Advanced to quarterfinals
2	United States	3	2	0	1	28	26	+2	4	Advanced to playoffs
3	Italy	3	1	0	2	28	28	0	2	Advanced to playoffs
4	Russia	3	0	0	3	23	31	−8	0	

Source: SportResult.com
Rules for classification: 1) points; 2) head-to-head points; 3) head-to-head goal difference; 4) head-to-head number of goals scored; 5) goal difference.

27 July 2015; 12:10	Report	Greece	11–10	Italy	Kazan; Attendance: 883; Referees: Francesc Buch (ESP), György Kun (HUN)
27 July 2015; 12:10	Report	Score by quarters: 4–4, 2–1, 3–2, 2–3			Kazan; Attendance: 883; Referees: Francesc Buch (ESP), György Kun (HUN)
27 July 2015; 12:10	Report	Afroudakis 3	Goals	four players 2	Kazan; Attendance: 883; Referees: Francesc Buch (ESP), György Kun (HUN)

29 July 2015; 09:30	Report	Greece	11–10	United States	Kazan; Attendance: 839; Referees: Francesc Buch (ESP), Vojin Putniković (SRB)
29 July 2015; 09:30	Report	Score by quarters: 3–3, 1–3, 4–3, 3–1			Kazan; Attendance: 839; Referees: Francesc Buch (ESP), Vojin Putniković (SRB)
29 July 2015; 09:30	Report	Fountoulis 4	Goals	three players 2	Kazan; Attendance: 839; Referees: Francesc Buch (ESP), Vojin Putniković (SRB)

31 July 2015; 18:50	Report	Greece	15–11	Russia	Kazan; Attendance: 2,285; Referees: Adrian Alexandrescu (ROU), Francesc Buch (ESP)
31 July 2015; 18:50	Report	Score by quarters: 5–2, 3–2, 5–3, 2–4			Kazan; Attendance: 2,285; Referees: Adrian Alexandrescu (ROU), Francesc Buch (ESP)
31 July 2015; 18:50	Report	Fountoulis 4	Goals	Nagaev 3	Kazan; Attendance: 2,285; Referees: Adrian Alexandrescu (ROU), Francesc Buch (ESP)

Quarterfinals

4 August 2015; 18:50	Report	Greece	7–7 (PSO)	Australia	Kazan; Attendance: 1,996; Referees: Boris Margeta (SLO), Vojin Putniković (SRB)
4 August 2015; 18:50	Report	Score by quarters: 1–0, 1–3, 3–1, 2–3 PSO: 5–4			Kazan; Attendance: 1,996; Referees: Boris Margeta (SLO), Vojin Putniković (SRB)
4 August 2015; 18:50	Report	Fountoulis, Genidounias 2	Goals	Younger 3	Kazan; Attendance: 1,996; Referees: Boris Margeta (SLO), Vojin Putniković (SRB)

Semifinals

6 August 2015; 20:30	Report	Croatia	10–10 (PSO)	Greece	Kazan; Attendance: 2,486; Referees: Adrian Alexandrescu (ROU), Daniel Flahive (AUS)
6 August 2015; 20:30	Report	Score by quarters: 3–1, 2–3, 3–2, 2–4 PSO: 5–3			Kazan; Attendance: 2,486; Referees: Adrian Alexandrescu (ROU), Daniel Flahive (AUS)
6 August 2015; 20:30	Report	four players 2	Goals	Vlahopoulos 3	Kazan; Attendance: 2,486; Referees: Adrian Alexandrescu (ROU), Daniel Flahive (AUS)

Third place game

8 August 2015; 20:30	Report	Greece	7–7 (PSO)	Italy	Kazan; Attendance: 2,165; Referees: Adrian Alexandrescu (ROU), Radosław Koryzna (POL)
8 August 2015; 20:30	Report	Score by quarters: 1–0, 2–2, 4–4, 0–1 PSO: 4–2			Kazan; Attendance: 2,165; Referees: Adrian Alexandrescu (ROU), Radosław Koryzna (POL)
8 August 2015; 20:30	Report	Vlahopoulos 3	Goals	Aicardi, Figlioli 2	Kazan; Attendance: 2,165; Referees: Adrian Alexandrescu (ROU), Radosław Koryzna (POL)

=== Women's tournament ===
Team roster

- Eleni Kouvdou
- Christina Tsoukala
- Stefania Charalampidi
- Christina Kotsia
- Margarita Plevritou
- Alkisti Avramidou
- Alexandra Asimaki
- Antigoni Roumpesi
- Ioanna Charalampidi
- Triantafyllia Manolioudaki
- Eleftheria Plevritou
- Eleni Xenaki
- Chrysoula Diamantopoulou

Group play

Pos	Team	Pld	W	D	L	GF	GA	GD	Pts	Qualification
1	Australia	3	3	0	0	35	14	+21	6	Advanced to quarterfinals
2	Netherlands	3	2	0	1	38	18	+20	4	Advanced to playoffs
3	Greece	3	1	0	2	36	22	+14	2	Advanced to playoffs
4	South Africa	3	0	0	3	6	61	−55	0	

Source: SportResult.com
Rules for classification: 1) points; 2) head-to-head points; 3) head-to-head goal difference; 4) head-to-head number of goals scored; 5) goal difference.

26 July 2015; 12:10	Report	Australia	8–7	Greece	Kazan; Attendance: 1,035; Referees: Massimiliano Caputi (ITA), Sergey Naumov (RUS)
26 July 2015; 12:10	Report	Score by quarters: 2–1, 1–3, 2–1, 3–2			Kazan; Attendance: 1,035; Referees: Massimiliano Caputi (ITA), Sergey Naumov (RUS)
26 July 2015; 12:10	Report	Zagame 2	Goals	Tsoukala 4	Kazan; Attendance: 1,035; Referees: Massimiliano Caputi (ITA), Sergey Naumov (RUS)

28 July 2015; 09:30	Report	Netherlands	10–9	Greece	Kazan; Attendance: 280; Referees: Boris Margeta (SLO), Radosław Koryzna (POL)
28 July 2015; 09:30	Report	Score by quarters: 2–3, 2–2, 5–2, 1–2			Kazan; Attendance: 280; Referees: Boris Margeta (SLO), Radosław Koryzna (POL)
28 July 2015; 09:30	Report	Van der Sloot 4	Goals	Plevritou, Roumpesi 2	Kazan; Attendance: 280; Referees: Boris Margeta (SLO), Radosław Koryzna (POL)

30 July 2015; 21:30	Report	South Africa	4–20	Greece	Kazan; Attendance: 130; Referees: Anne Grandin (FRA), Ni Shi Wei (CHN)
30 July 2015; 21:30	Report	Score by quarters: 1–5, 1–6, 1–4, 1–5			Kazan; Attendance: 130; Referees: Anne Grandin (FRA), Ni Shi Wei (CHN)
30 July 2015; 21:30	Report	Versfeld, White 2	Goals	Asimaki 5	Kazan; Attendance: 130; Referees: Anne Grandin (FRA), Ni Shi Wei (CHN)

Playoffs

1 August 2015; 13:30	Report	Canada	5–8	Greece	Kazan; Attendance: 2,055; Referees: German Moller (ARG), Vojin Putniković (SRB)
1 August 2015; 13:30	Report	Score by quarters: 3–3, 1–1, 0–2, 1–2			Kazan; Attendance: 2,055; Referees: German Moller (ARG), Vojin Putniković (SRB)
1 August 2015; 13:30	Report	Valin 2	Goals	Charalampidi 3	Kazan; Attendance: 2,055; Referees: German Moller (ARG), Vojin Putniković (SRB)

Quarterfinals

3 August 2015; 21:30	Report	Italy	9–6	Greece	Kazan; Referees: Mark Koganov (AZE), Radosław Koryzna (POL)
3 August 2015; 21:30	Report	Score by quarters: 1–0, 3–3, 3–2, 2–1			Kazan; Referees: Mark Koganov (AZE), Radosław Koryzna (POL)
3 August 2015; 21:30	Report	Di Mario 4	Goals	Charalampidi 3	Kazan; Referees: Mark Koganov (AZE), Radosław Koryzna (POL)

5th–8th place semifinals

5 August 2015; 17:00	Report	Greece	12–12 (PSO)	Russia	Kazan; Attendance: 690; Referees: Adrian Alexandrescu (ROU), György Kun (HUN)
5 August 2015; 17:00	Report	Score by quarters: 4–3, 1–4, 3–2, 4–3 PSO: 4–3			Kazan; Attendance: 690; Referees: Adrian Alexandrescu (ROU), György Kun (HUN)
5 August 2015; 17:00	Report	Roumpesi 3	Goals	Ivanova 4	Kazan; Attendance: 690; Referees: Adrian Alexandrescu (ROU), György Kun (HUN)

Fifth place game

7 August 2015; 15:30	Report	China	9–9 (PSO)	Greece	Kazan; Attendance: 940; Referees: Mark Koganov (AZE), György Kun (HUN)
7 August 2015; 15:30	Report	Score by quarters: 4–2, 1–3, 2–1, 2–3 PSO: 4–3			Kazan; Attendance: 940; Referees: Mark Koganov (AZE), György Kun (HUN)
7 August 2015; 15:30	Report	Niu Guannan 5	Goals	Asimaki 4	Kazan; Attendance: 940; Referees: Mark Koganov (AZE), György Kun (HUN)
