= Open water swimming at the 2011 World Aquatics Championships – Team =

Open water swimming team event at the 2011 World Aquatics Championships
- Venue: Jinshan City Beach
- Location: Jinshan, Shanghai
- Dates: 21 July
- Teams: 15
- Winning time: 57:00.6

Medalists
gold medal	Andrew Gemmell; Sean Ryan; Ashley Twichell	United States
silver medal	Melissa Gorman; Rhys Mainstone; Ky Hurst	Australia
bronze medal	Jan Wolfgarten; Thomas Lurz; Isabelle Härle	Germany

The open water swimming team event at the 2011 World Aquatics Championships was held on 21 July 2011 off the coast of Jinshan City Beach in Jinshan, Shanghai, China.

The United States won gold with a time of 57:00.6, while Australia won silver with 57:01.8, and Germany won bronze with 57:44.2.

== Event description ==
It was the first time this event took place at a world championship. Each country was represented by three swimmers who swam as a team. Each team swam the same 5-kilometre double-loop, with each member of the team starting at the same time. The time it took the last member of the team to complete the course determined the team's time, which determined the finishing positions as in a time trial. A staggered start was implemented, meaning each team was set off individually one minute after the previous team. Teams were required to include at least one man and one woman.

== Race ==
The race started at 09:00 CST on 21 July. It took place off the coast of Jinshan City Beach in Jinshan, Shanghai, China.

The United States swam in a single file formation for the entire race to make use of drafting, with Andrew Gemmell in front, followed by Sean Ryan and then Ashley Twichell. The Australian team, consisting of Melissa Gorman, Rhys Mainstone, and Ky Hurst, spread out a bit more, swimming nearer each other's hips. At the end of the first lap, the United States had the fastest split, followed by Germany and then Australia. Over the second lap, the Australians overtook the German's pace and caught up nearly a minute on the United States. The United States won gold with a time of 57:00.6. Australia won silver with 57:01.8, and Germany won bronze with 57:44.2.

After the race, Gemmell said "It was pretty incredible for a 5km race to come down to a single second for two teams that started 10 minutes apart. It just shows you how tight the race was. We did a great job working together as a team."

Results
Rank	Nation	Swimmers	Time
1st place, gold medalist(s)	United States	Andrew Gemmell; Sean Ryan; Ashley Twichell	57:00.6
2nd place, silver medalist(s)	Australia	Melissa Gorman; Rhys Mainstone; Ky Hurst	57:01.8
3rd place, bronze medalist(s)	Germany	Jan Wolfgarten; Thomas Lurz; Isabelle Härle	57:44.2
4	Italy	Nicola Bolzonello; Rachele Bruni; Luca Ferretti	58:00.5
5	Russia	Sergey Bolshakov; Evgeny Drattsev; Ekaterina Seliverstova	58:32.7
6	Greece	Marianna Lymperta; Antonios Fokaidis; Spyridon Gianniotis	59:22.8
7	France	Ophélie Aspord; Damien Cattin-Vidal; Sébastien Fraysse	1:00:27.3
8	China	Fang Yanqiao; Xu Wenchao; Zhang Zibin	1:01:02.2
9	Argentina	Guillermo Bertola; Cecilia Biagioli; Gabriel Villagoiz	1:01:34.2
10	Canada	Zsófi Balazs; Aimeson King; Richard Weinberger	1:02:08.7
11	Venezuela	Erwin Maldonado; Angel Moreira; Yanel Pinto	1:02:32.0
12	Mexico	Zaira Cardenas Hernandez; Alejandra Gonzalez Lara; Luis Ricardo Escobar Torres	1:03:23.9
13	Hong Kong	Chan Fiona On Yi; Natasha Tang; Yuen Marcus Yat Ho	1:04:53.4
14	Egypt	Mazen Mohamed Aziz; Islam Mohsen; Laila El Basiouny	1:06:03.4
–	South Africa	Natalie du Toit; Chad Ho; Troy Prinsloo	DNS

== Further information ==
- Eggert, Greg (21 July 2011). "USA Trio Capture First Medal in World Championships With Victory in 5km Team Event". World Aquatics. Archived from the original on 12 October 2025. – Further quotes from the US and Australian swimmers
