= Open water swimming at the 2014 European Aquatics Championships – Women's 5 km =

Women's 5 km at the Open water swimming at the 2014 European Aquatics Championships
- Dates: 14 August
- Competitors: 22 from 11 nations
- Winning time: 57:55.7

Medalists
gold medal	Isabelle Härle	Germany
silver medal	Sharon van Rouwendaal	Netherlands
bronze medal	Mireia Belmonte	Spain

The Women's 5 km competition of the 2014 European Aquatics Championships was held on 14 August. The time trial format was used, swimmers started at 1-minute intervals from each other and raced against the clock.

== Results ==
The race was held at 13:30.

Rank	Swimmer	Nationality	Time
1st place, gold medalist(s)	Isabelle Härle	Germany	57:55.7
2nd place, silver medalist(s)	Sharon van Rouwendaal	Netherlands	58:29.9
3rd place, bronze medalist(s)	Mireia Belmonte	Spain	58:41.4
4	Éva Risztov	Hungary	58:48.7
5	Rachele Bruni	Italy	58:56.3
6	Kalliopi Araouzou	Greece	59:37.2
7	Mariia Novikova	Russia	59:50.5
8	Erika Villaécija García	Spain	1:00:06.4
9	Patricia Wartenberg	Germany	1:00:08.4
10	Finnia Wunram	Germany	1:00:19.7
11	Nikolett Szilágyi	Hungary	1:00:46.9
12	Isabella Sinisi	Italy	1:00:48.9
13	Anastasiia Krapivina	Russia	1:01:02.7
14	Elizaveta Gorshkova	Russia	1:01:12.1
15	Julie Berthier	France	1:01:13.8
16	Alice Dearing	Great Britain	1:01:50.9
17	Giorgia Consiglio	Italy	1:01:52.0
18	Jana Pechanová	Czech Republic	1:02:10.8
19	Lucinda Campbell	Great Britain	1:03:12.9
20	Luisa Mar Morales	Spain	1:03:26.6
21	Kseniya Skrypel	Ukraine	1:03:30.3
22	Barbora Picková	Czech Republic	1:05:33.4
