= Open water swimming at the 2013 World Aquatics Championships – Team =

Open water swimming team event at the 2013 World Aquatics Championships
- Venue: Moll de la Fusta harbour
- Location: Port Vell
- Dates: 25 July
- Teams: 22
- Winning time: 52:54.9

Medalists
gold medal	Thomas Lurz; Christian Reichert; Isabelle Härle	Germany
silver medal	Antonios Fokaidis; Spyridon Gianniotis; Kalliopi Araouzou	Greece
bronze medal	Allan do Carmo; Samuel de Bona; Poliana Okimoto	Brazil

The open water swimming team event at the 2013 World Aquatics Championships was held on 25 July 2013 at the Moll de la Fusta harbour in Port Vell, Barcelona, Spain.

Germany won gold with a time of 52:54.9, Greece won silver with 54:03.3, and Brazil won bronze with 54:03.5.

== Event description ==
Each country was represented by three swimmers who swam as a team. Each team swam the same 5-kilometre double-loop, with each member of the team starting at the same time. The time it took the last member of the team to complete the course determined the team's time, which determined the finishing positions as in a time trial. A staggered start was implemented, meaning each team was set off individually one minute after the previous team.

Teams were required to contain at least one man and one woman.

== Race ==
The race started at 12:00 CET on 25 July. It took place at the Moll de la Fusta harbour in Port Vell, Barcelona, Spain.

Swimmers swam close to their teammates to draft each other and reduce overall effort. Germany was the fourth team to start its swim, and they overtook the three teams in front of them on course to win the gold with a time of 52:54.9. SwimSwam wrote that the race was "pure domination" by the Germans. Greece won silver with 54:03.3, and Brazil won bronze with 54:03.5.

The United States, who won the inaugural version of the event at the previous World Championships, finished sixth. After the race, Andrew Gemmell of the US said "That race was much deeper and much faster than it was in 2011. The other teams have a lot more experience and are putting a lot more emphasis on it. That's something we can keep improving on." Hungary finished ninth with two women in its team, while all the other teams were composed of two men and one woman.

Brazil's bronze was their fifth medal in open water swimming at the Championships, and Thomas Lurz's participation in the German team earned him his third medal of the Championships and the sixth World Championship gold of his career. Poliana Okimoto also won her third medal of the Championships as part of the Brazilian team.

Results
Rank	Nation	Swimmers	Time
1st place, gold medalist(s)	Germany	Thomas Lurz; Christian Reichert; Isabelle Härle	52:54.9
2nd place, silver medalist(s)	Greece	Antonios Fokaidis; Spyridon Gianniotis; Kalliopi Araouzou	54:03.3
3rd place, bronze medalist(s)	Brazil	Allan do Carmo; Samuel de Bona; Poliana Okimoto	54:03.5
4	Australia	Jarrod Poort; Simon Huitenga; Melissa Gorman	54:16.1
5	Italy	Luca Ferretti; Simone Ercoli; Rachele Bruni	54:34.0
6	United States	Andrew Gemmell; Sean Ryan; Haley Anderson	54:44.7
7	France	Damien Cattin-Vidal; Bertrand Venturi; Aurelie Muller	55:26.3
8	Russia	Evgeny Drattsev; Kirill Abrosimov; Elizaveta Gorshkova	56:08.7
9	Hungary	Márk Papp; Anna Olasz; Éva Risztov	56:09.4
10	New Zealand	Phillip Ryan; Kane Radford; Cara Baker	56:12.0
11	South Africa	Daniel Marais; Chad Ho; Kyna Pereira	56:34.7
12	Canada	Eric Hedlin; Philippe Guertin; Zsofia Balazs	57:13.7
13	Japan	Yuto Kobayashi; Yasunari Hirai; Yumi Kida	58:00.0
14	China	Weng Jingwei; Han Lidu; Cao Shiyue	58:02.6
15	Argentina	Guillermo Bertola; Martin Carrizo; Florencia Mazzei	58:12.0
16	Mexico	Miguel Hernández; Iván López; Lizeth Rueda	58:17.7
17	Venezuela	Johndry Segovia; Luis Bolanos; Florencia Melo	58:59.9
18	Tunisia	Seifeddine Sghaier; Badr Chebchoub; Maroua Mathlouthi	59:19.4
19	Kazakhstan	Vitaliy Khudyakov; Vladimir Tolikin; Xeniya Romanchuk	1:00:15.8
20	Ecuador	Ivan Enderica Ochoa; Santiago Enderica; Katia Barros	1:00:32.6
21	Egypt	Youssef Hossameldeen; Adel Ragab; Laila El Basiouny	1:01:02.2
22	Hong Kong	Ching Leung Sunny Poon; Li Chun Hong; Fiona On Yi Chan	1:05:26.9

== Further information ==
- BCN2013: Thomas Lurz & Isabelle Haerle (GER) Winners of 5 km Team Openwater (Video). World Aquatics. 25 July 2013 – via YouTube. – Interviews with Thomas Lurz and Isabelle Härle of Germany
- Eggert, Greg (25 July 2013). "Open Water, Day 4: Thomas Lurz powers his German teammates to gold in Team 5km event". World Aquatics. Archived from the original on 12 October 2025. – Quotes from all the medalling swimmers after the race
- Pablo, San Román (25 July 2013). "Brasil Gana Bronce en 5 km por Equipos, su Quinta Medalla en Barcelona". Yahoo News (in Spanish). Agence France-Presse. Archived from the original on 12 October 2025. – Further quotes and details on Brazil's performance
