= Marathon swimming at the 2016 Summer Olympics – Men's 10 kilometre =

Men's marathon swimming at the Games of the XXXI Olympiad
- Venue: Fort Copacabana, Rio de Janeiro
- Dates: 16 August 2016
- Competitors: 25 from 23 nations
- Winning time: 1:52:59.8

Medalists
1st place, gold medalist(s)		Ferry Weertman	Netherlands
2nd place, silver medalist(s)		Spyridon Gianniotis	Greece
3rd place, bronze medalist(s)		Marc-Antoine Olivier	France

The men's marathon swimming at the 2016 Summer Olympics in Rio de Janeiro took place on 16 August at Fort Copacabana, over a distance of 10 kilometres.

== Summary ==
A photo finish saw Ferry Weertman of the Netherlands narrowly win the gold over Spyridon Gianniotis of Greece in a time of 1:52:59.8, with Gianniotis coming it at 1:53:00.5. In the final race of his career, Gianniotis, who was the oldest competitor at the age of 36, won the first medal for Greece in swimming since the inaugural 1896 Summer Olympics in Athens.

The battle for bronze also saw a photo finish, with France's Marc-Antoine Olivier edging Zu Lijun of China and Jack Burnell of Great Britain. All three had identical times of 1:53:02.0. Burnell was subsequently disqualified for a second yellow card for a tussle with defending champion Oussama Mellouli just before the line.

== Qualification ==
The men's 10 km open water marathon at the 2016 Olympics featured a field of 25 swimmers:

- 10: the top-10 finishers in the 10 km races at the 2015 World Championships
- 9: the top-9 finishers at the 2016 Olympic Marathon Swim Qualifier (June 11–12, 2016 in Setúbal, Portugal)
- 5: one representative from each FINA continent (Africa, Americas, Asia, Europe and Oceania). (These have been selected based on the finishes at the qualifying race in Setúbal.)
- 1: from the host nation (Brazil) if not qualified by other means. If Brazil already contained a qualifier in the race, this spot had been allocated back into the general pool from the 2016 Olympic qualifier race.

== Competition format ==
Unlike all of the swimming events in the pool, the men's and women's marathon 10 kilometre races are held in open water. No preliminary heats are held, with only the single mass-start race being contested. This race is held using freestyle swimming, with a lack of stroke regulations.

== Results ==
Rank	Athlete	Nation	Time	Time behind	Notes
1st place, gold medalist(s)	Ferry Weertman	Netherlands	1:52:59.8		
2nd place, silver medalist(s)	Spyridon Gianniotis	Greece	1:53:00.5	+0.7	
3rd place, bronze medalist(s)	Marc-Antoine Olivier	France	1:53:02.0	+2.2	
4	Zu Lijun	China	1:53:02.0	+2.2	
5	Jordan Wilimovsky	United States	1:53:03.2	+3.4	
6	Simone Ruffini	Italy	1:53:03.5	+3.7	
7	Federico Vanelli	Italy	1:53:03.9	+4.1	
8	Yasunari Hirai	Japan	1:53:04.6	+4.8	
9	Christian Reichert	Germany	1:53:04.7	+4.9	
10	Chad Ho	South Africa	1:53:04.8	+5.0	
11	Evgeny Drattsev	Russia	1:53:04.8	+5.0	
12	Oussama Mellouli	Tunisia	1:53:06.1	+6.3	
13	Márk Papp	Hungary	1:53:11.7	+11.9	
14	Sean Ryan	United States	1:53:15.5	+15.7	
15	Ventsislav Aydarski	Bulgaria	1:53:16.1	+16.3	
16	Ivan Enderica Ochoa	Ecuador	1:53:16.2	+16.4	
17	Richard Weinberger	Canada	1:53:16.4	+16.6	
18	Allan do Carmo	Brazil	1:53:16.4	+16.6	
19	Kane Radford	New Zealand	1:53:18.7	+18.9	
20	Richard Nagy	Slovakia	1:53:35.4	+35.6	
21	Jarrod Poort	Australia	1:53:40.7	+40.9	
22	Erwin Maldonado	Venezuela	1:54:33.6	+1:33.8	
23	Marwan El-Amrawy	Egypt	1:59:17.2	+6:17.4	
	Vitaliy Khudyakov	Kazakhstan			DSQ
	Jack Burnell	Great Britain			DSQ
