= Open water swimming at the 2015 World Aquatics Championships – Women's 5 km =

Women's 5 km at the 2015 World Aquatics Championships
- Dates: 25 July
- Competitors: 38 from 26 nations
- Winning time: 58:48.4

Medalists
gold medal	Haley Anderson	United States
silver medal	Kalliopi Araouzou	Greece
bronze medal	Finnia Wunram	Germany

The Women's 5 km competition of the open water swimming events at the 2015 World Aquatics Championships was held on 25 July 2015.

== Results ==
The race was started at 10:00.

Rank	Swimmer	Nationality	Time
1st place, gold medalist(s)	Haley Anderson	United States	58:48.4
2nd place, silver medalist(s)	Kalliopi Araouzou	Greece	58:49.8
3rd place, bronze medalist(s)	Finnia Wunram	Germany	58:51.0
4	Sharon van Rouwendaal	Netherlands	58:55.5
5	Jessica Walker	Australia	59:09.9
6	Ashley Twichell	United States	59:10.0
7	Melissa Gorman	Australia	59:12.7
8	Anastasiia Krapivina	Russia	59:12.7
9	Arianna Bridi	Italy	59:12.9
10	Erika Villaécija	Spain	59:15.0
11	Martina Grimaldi	Italy	59:16.0
12	Éva Risztov	Hungary	59:16.1
13	Anna Olasz	Hungary	59:16.5
14	Anastasiia Azarova	Russia	59:19.8
15	Betina Lorscheitter	Brazil	59:57.8
16	Špela Perše	Slovenia	59:59.7
17	Carolina Bilich	Brazil	1:00:07.2
18	Alena Benešová	Czech Republic	1:00:50.3
19	Samantha Harding	Canada	1:00:50.3
20	Fang Yanqiao	China	1:00:51.7
21	Heidi Gan	Malaysia	1:00:52.1
22	Jade Dusablon	Canada	1:00:52.7
23	Alice Dearing	Great Britain	1:00:53.3
24	María Vilas	Spain	1:00:53.6
25	Nataly Caldas	Ecuador	1:01:10.2
26	Niu Xiaoxiao	China	1:03:50.4
27	Carmen Le Roux	South Africa	1:04:06.3
28	Mayte Cano	Mexico	1:04:25.7
29	Melissa Villaseñor Reyes	Mexico	1:04:40.3
30	Ellen Olsson	Sweden	1:04:47.1
31	Fatima Flores	El Salvador	1:04:49.4
32	Clarice Le Roux	South Africa	1:05:50.8
33	Toscano Cindy	Guatemala	1:06:19.2
34	Lok Hoi Man	Hong Kong	1:09:10.0
35	Kwok Cho Yiu	Hong Kong	1:09:18.7
36	Angelica Astorga	Costa Rica	1:09:19.7
37	Mariya Ivanova	Kazakhstan	1:09:22.8
38	Alondra Castillo	Bolivia	1:10:27.4
	Karla Šitić	Croatia	DNS
	Raina Ramdhani	Indonesia	DNS
	Julia Arino	Argentina	DNS
