= Christian Reichert =

German swimmer (born 1985)

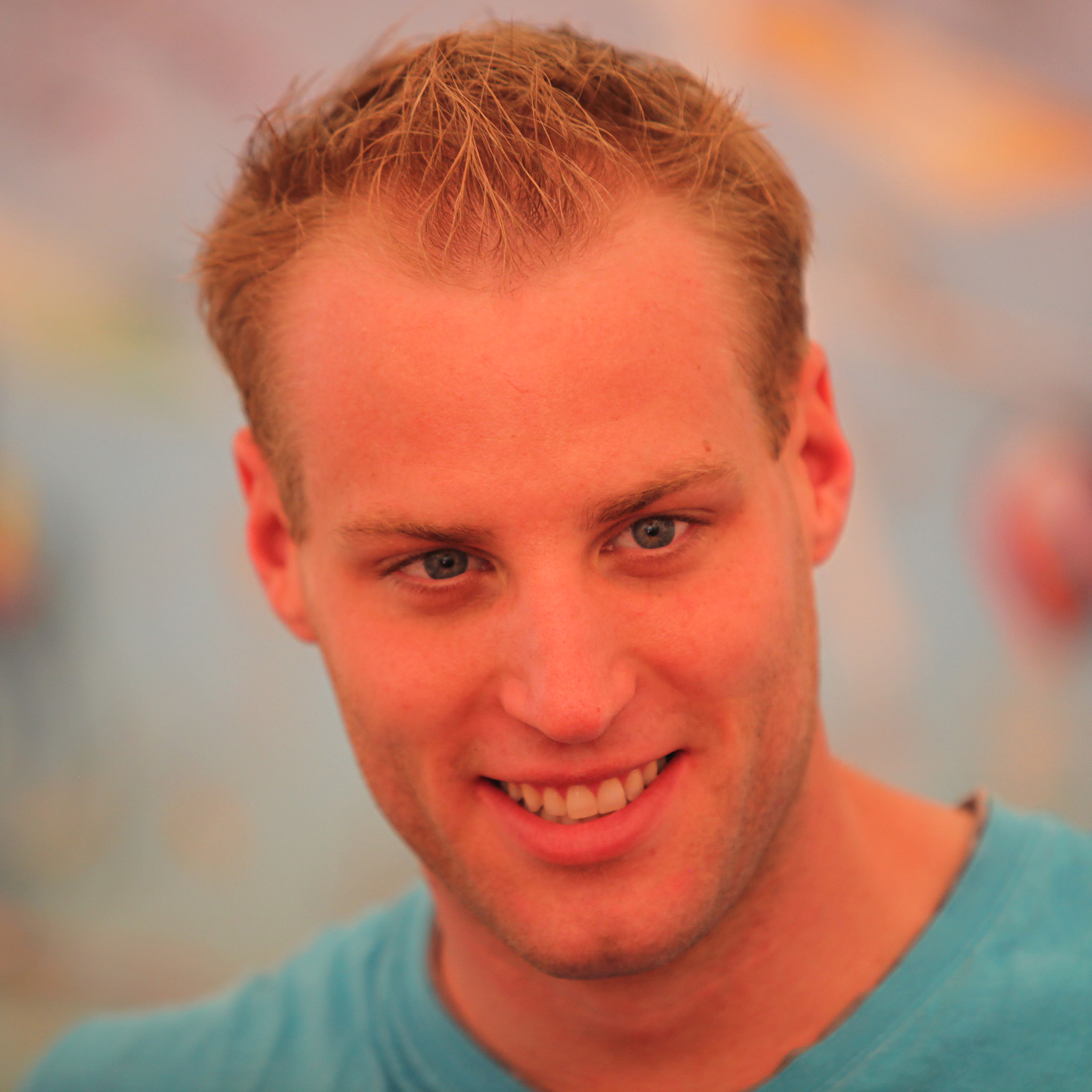
- Reichert in 2014

Personal information
- Born: 7 February 1985 (age 41) Würzburg, Bayern, West Germany

Sport
- Sport: Swimming
Medal record
Men's open water swimming
Representing Germany
World Championships
Gold medal – first place	2013 Barcelona	Team
Gold medal – first place	2015 Kazan	Team

Christian Reichert (born 7 February 1985) is a German swimmer. Since 2011, he participates in the open water events.

He won the gold medal in the Team event at the 2013 World Aquatics Championships in Barcelona alongside his teammates Thomas Lurz and Isabelle Härle.

At the 2016 Summer Olympics in Rio de Janeiro, he competed in the men's 10 km marathon swim. He finished in 9th place with a time of 1:53:04.7.
