= Sharon van Rouwendaal =

Dutch swimmer

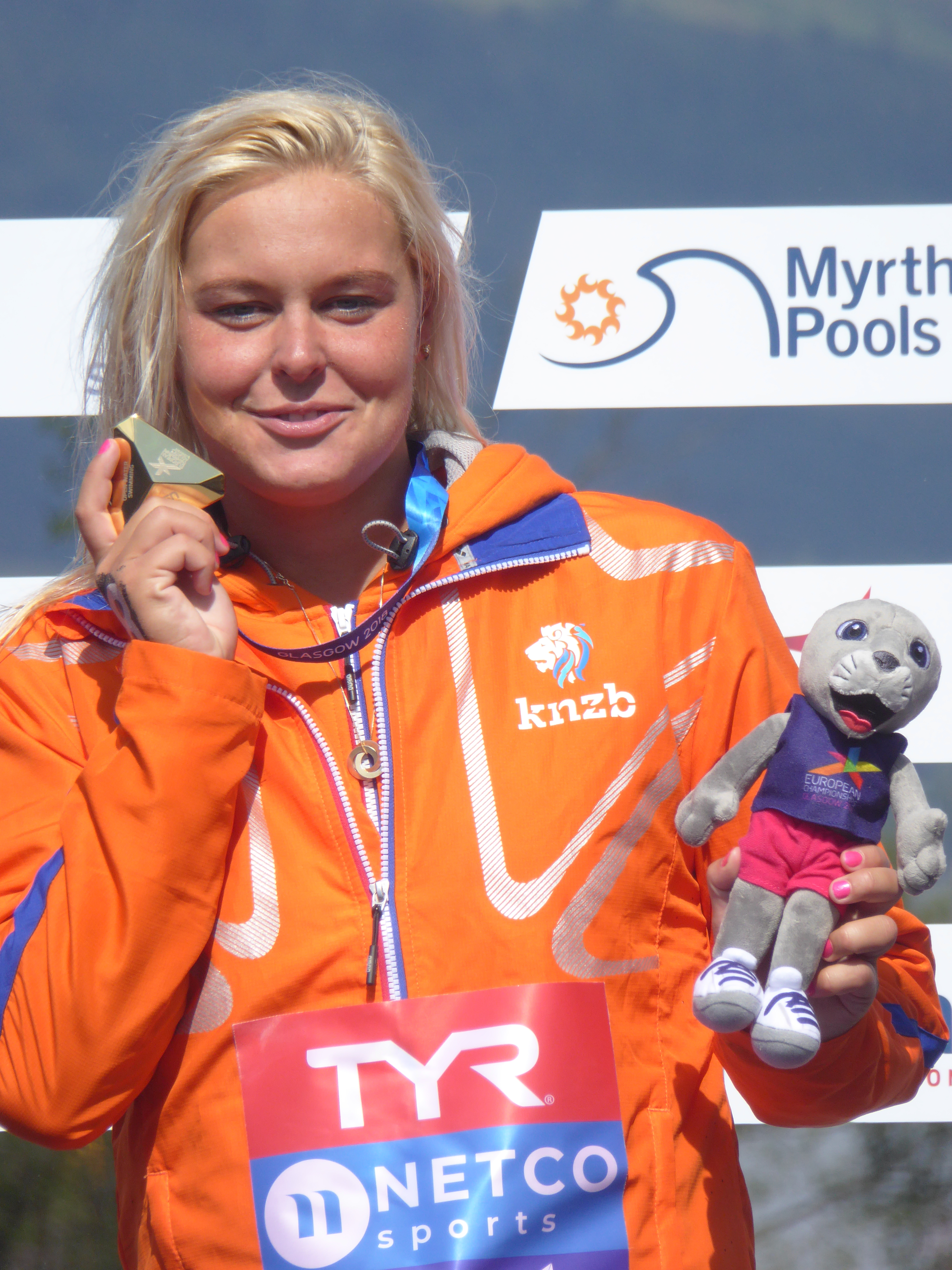
- Van Rouwendaal at the 2018 European Open Water Swimming Championships

Personal information
- National team: Netherlands
- Born: 9 September 1993 (age 33) Baarn, Netherlands
- Height: 1.72 m (5 ft 8 in)
- Weight: 64 kg (141 lb)

Sport
- Sport: Swimming
- Strokes: Freestyle, open water
- Club: SC Magdeburg
- Coach: Bernd Berkhahn
Medal record
Women's swimming
Representing the Netherlands
Event	1st	2nd	3rd
Olympic Games	2	1	0
World Aquatics Championships	3	5	2
World Championships (SC)	1	1	1
European Aquatics Championships	8	3	0
European Championships (SC)	0	2	2
Total	14	12	5
Olympic Games
Gold medal – first place	2016 Rio de Janeiro	10 km open water
Gold medal – first place	2024 Paris	10 km open water
Silver medal – second place	2020 Tokyo	10 km open water
World Aquatics Championships
Gold medal – first place	2022 Budapest	10 km open water
Gold medal – first place	2024 Doha	5 km open water
Gold medal – first place	2024 Doha	10 km open water
Silver medal – second place	2015 Kazan	400 m freestyle
Silver medal – second place	2015 Kazan	10 km open water
Silver medal – second place	2015 Kazan	Team open water
Silver medal – second place	2017 Budapest	25 km open water
Silver medal – second place	2023 Fukuoka	5 km open water
Bronze medal – third place	2011 Shanghai	200 m backstroke
Bronze medal – third place	2022 Budapest	25 km open water
World Championships (SC)
Gold medal – first place	2014 Doha	4×200 m freestyle
Silver medal – second place	2014 Doha	400 m freestyle
Bronze medal – third place	2014 Doha	800 m freestyle
European Aquatics Championships
Gold medal – first place	2014 Berlin	10 km open water
Gold medal – first place	2014 Berlin	Team open water
Gold medal – first place	2018 Glasgow	5 km open water
Gold medal – first place	2018 Glasgow	10 km open water
Gold medal – first place	2018 Glasgow	Team open water
Gold medal – first place	2020 Budapest	5 km open water
Gold medal – first place	2020 Budapest	10 km open water
Gold medal – first place	2022 Rome	5 km open water
Silver medal – second place	2014 Berlin	400 m freestyle
Silver medal – second place	2014 Berlin	5 km open water
Silver medal – second place	2018 Glasgow	25 km open water
European Championships (SC)
Silver medal – second place	2010 Eindhoven	100 m backstroke
Silver medal – second place	2010 Eindhoven	200 m backstroke
Bronze medal – third place	2013 Herning	800 m freestyle
Bronze medal – third place	2015 Netanya	800 m freestyle
European Open Water Championships
Bronze medal – third place	2016 Hoorn	5 km open water

Sharon van Rouwendaal (born 9 September 1993) is a retired Dutch swimmer and the Olympic gold medalist in the 10 km open water marathon at the 2016 Olympics in Rio de Janeiro and the 2024 Olympics in Paris.

She grew up in Soest, and later moved to France with her parents. In 2009, she moved to Eindhoven to train with Jeanet Mulder, after she had qualified for the 2010 European Aquatics Championships she changed coach to Jacco Verhaeren. As of 2014 she is coached by Philippe Lucas in Narbonne and Marcel Wouda in Eindhoven. She is noted for her versatility, and focuses on distance freestyle events. In a country known for its sprinters, she is the only elite distance swimmer. She has won several medals at European and world championships, both in open water and pool events.

== Junior career ==
Van Rouwendaal won four medals in middle- and long-distance freestyle events at the 2008 European Junior Championships in Belgrade, including a gold medal in the 1500 meter in a Dutch senior record (long course). A year later, she won a gold medal at the 2009 European Junior Championships in Prague in the 400 meter freestyle.

== Senior career ==
Van Rouwendaal made her senior debut at the 2008 European Short Course Championships in Rijeka. Two years later, at the 2010 European Short Course Championships in Eindhoven, she made her international breakthrough by winning two silver medals, in the 100 m and 200 m backstroke. She finished in fifth place at the 2010 world short course championships in Dubai in the 200 meter backstroke a few weeks later.

At the 2011 World Aquatics Championships in Shanghai she won the bronze medal in the 200 m backstroke behind Missy Franklin and Belinda Hocking.

=== 2012 Olympics ===
The 2012 Olympics in London were Van Rouwendaal's first Olympics. She competed individually in the 100 m backstroke and 200 m backstroke but due to a shoulder injury she did not make the finals. In the 200 meter backstroke event she finished 11th in the semifinals. In the 4 × 100 m medley relay she did swim the final, finishing 6th with the Dutch team. Van Rouwendaal (swimming the backstroke lead-off leg) and her teammates Moniek Nijhuis (breaststroke), Inge Dekker (butterfly), and Ranomi Kromowidjojo (freestyle) broke the Dutch record in this event.

Her shoulder injury caused her to miss the 2013 World Aquatics Championships.

=== 2014 European Championships ===
At the 2014 European Aquatics Championships in Berlin, Van Rouwendaal won the gold medal in the 10 km open water, upsetting reigning Olympic champion Éva Risztov of Hungary by 1.1 seconds. This was her first gold medal in a major international championship. With her teammates Marcel Schouten and Ferry Weertman she won another gold medal in the 5 km team time trial. She also won the silver medal in the 5 km, and another silver in the 400 meter freestyle in the pool behind Britain's Jazmin Carlin. She finished 5th in the 800 m freestyle final and missed the final of the 1500 m freestyle by finishing 9th in the heats. She also competed in the 200 m butterfly but did not qualify for the semifinals.

Van Rouwendaal was voted 2014 European Open water swimmer of the year by European swimming federation LEN.

=== 2014 World Championships (short course) ===
Later in the year she won her first world title as a member of the 4 × 200 m freestyle relay at the short course world championships in Doha, Qatar. The team (also consisting of Inge Dekker, Femke Heemskerk, and Ranomi Kromowidjojo) broke China's four year old world record by more than 3 seconds with Van Rouwendaal splitting 1:52.73. She also won individual medals in the 400 m and 800 m freestyle.

=== 2015 World Championships ===
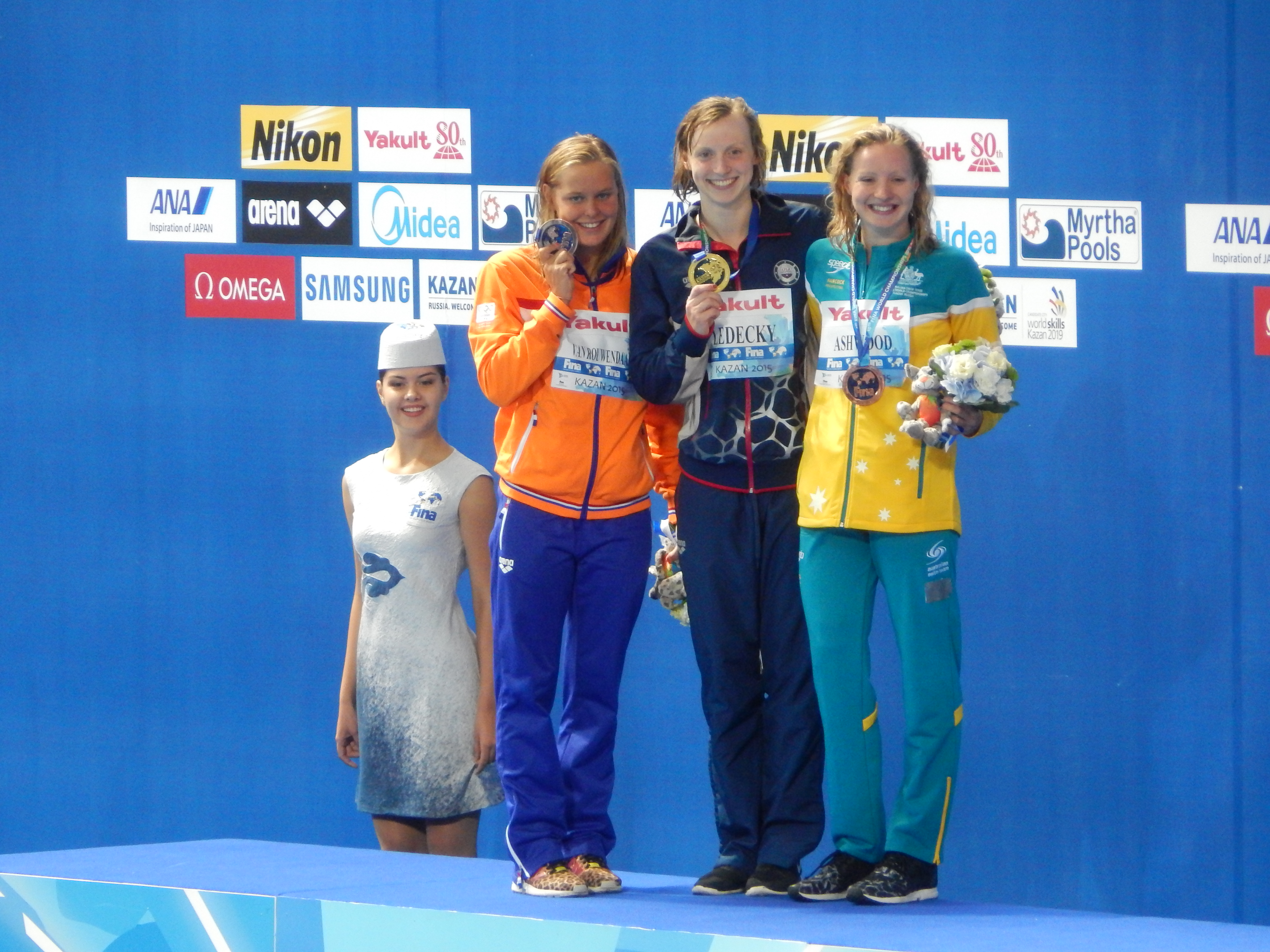
Van Rouwendaal at the 2015 World Aquatics Championships (second from left in orange jacket)

At the 2015 World Aquatics Championships in Kazan, Russia, Van Rouwendaal again competed both in the open water and pool events. In the open water events she won two silver medals. In the individual 10 km she finished 2.4 seconds behind Aurélie Muller of France for second place. By finishing in the top 10, she qualified for the 10 km marathon event at the 2016 Olympics in Rio de Janeiro. In the 5 km team time trial she and her teammates Marcel Schouten and Ferry Weertman finished in tied second place. She also finished 4th in the individual 5 km. In the pool, Van Rouwendaal won the silver medal in the 400 meter freestyle behind defending champion and world record holder Katie Ledecky, who had dominated this event since 2013. In this race she broke the Dutch record with a time of 4:03.02. In the heats of the 800 m freestyle, she also broke her own national record. She broke her record again in the final but finished in 8th place. In the 1500 m freestyle she finished 6th.

=== 2016 European Open Water Championships ===
At the 10 km event at the European Open Water Championships in Hoorn, the Netherlands, Van Rouwendaal missed a turn near the finish while in leading position. She ended up finishing 4th. Two days later she won a bronze medal in the 5 km event.

=== 2016 Summer Olympics ===
At the 2016 Summer Olympics in Rio de Janeiro, Van Rouwendaal missed the final of the 400 m freestyle, finishing 19th in the heats. She subsequently pulled out of the 800 m freestyle, and later won the gold medal in the 10 km marathon at Fort Copacabana in 1:56:32.1. After 6 km she broke away from the field, and finished 17 seconds ahead of silver medalist Rachele Bruni.

=== 2017 World Championships ===
At the 2017 FINA World Championships in Budapest, she secured a silver medal in the 25 km marathon swim.

=== 2018 European Championships ===
She continued her success at the 2018 European Championships in Glasgow, where she won both the 5 km and 10 km events, as well as the 5 km mixed team relay.

=== 2020 Summer Olympics ===
At the delayed 2020 Tokyo Olympics, held in 2021, Van Rouwendaal won the silver medal in the 10 km marathon swim, finishing just behind Brazil's Ana Marcela Cunha.

=== 2024 Summer Olympics ===
Competing in the River Seine, van Rouwendaal won the gold medal in the women's 10 km marathon swim at the Paris Olympics, finishing with a time of 2:03:34.2. The victory made her the first swimmer to win the Olympic women's marathon swimming event twice, eight years after her first gold medal in Rio de Janeiro. During the race, van Rouwendaal broke away from the main field alongside Italy's Ginevra Taddeucci and Australia's Moesha Johnson. With approximately 300 metres remaining and Johnson leading, van Rouwendaal moved toward the centre of the river and swam behind one of the Pont des Invalides pillars, where reduced current allowed her to conserve energy before overtaking Johnson near the finish. Van Rouwendaal later credited training on the course the day before the race with helping her understand the river's currents and plan her race strategy.

== See also ==
- List of Dutch records in swimming

Awards
Preceded by (Brazil) Ana Marcela Cunha	FINA Open Water Swimmer of the Year; 2016	Succeeded by (Brazil) Ana Marcela Cunha
