= Open water swimming at the 2014 European Aquatics Championships – Team event =

Team event in open water swimming at the 2014 European Aquatics Championships
- Dates: 16 August
- Competitors: 27 from 9 nations
- Winning time: 55:47.8

Medalists
gold medal	Ferry Weertman; Marcel Schouten; Sharon van Rouwendaal	Netherlands
silver medal	Spyridon Gianniotis; Antonios Fokaidis; Kalliopi Araouzou	Greece
bronze medal	Rob Muffels; Thomas Lurz; Isabelle Härle	Germany

The 5-kilometer team competition of the 2014 European Aquatics Championships was held on 16 August. The time trial format was used, teams started at 1-minute intervals from each other and raced against the clock.

== Results ==
The race was started at 10:00.

Rank	Swimmers	Nationality	Time
1st place, gold medalist(s)	Ferry Weertman; Marcel Schouten; Sharon van Rouwendaal	Netherlands	55:47.8
2nd place, silver medalist(s)	Spyridon Gianniotis; Antonios Fokaidis; Kalliopi Araouzou	Greece	56:05.5
3rd place, bronze medalist(s)	Rob Muffels; Thomas Lurz; Isabelle Härle	Germany	56:14.8
4	Gergely Gyurta; Patrik Rákos; Éva Risztov	Hungary	56:16.0
5	Simone Ercoli; Federico Vanelli; Aurora Ponselé	Italy	56:20.9
6	Aurélie Muller; Romain Beraud; Marc-Antoine Olivier	France	56:39.8
7	Daniel Fogg; Jack Burnell; Danielle Huskisson	Great Britain	58:06.5
8	Mariia Novikova; Kirill Abrosimov; Artem Podyakov	Russia	59:07.1
9	Joanna Zachoszcz; Jan Urbaniak; Mateusz Sawrymowicz	Poland	59:23.2
