= Marathon swimming at the 2016 Summer Olympics – Women's 10 kilometre =

Women's marathon 10 kilometre at the Games of the XXXI Olympiad
- Venue: Fort Copacabana, Rio de Janeiro
- Dates: 15 August 2016
- Competitors: 26 from 24 nations
- Winning time: 1:56:32

Medalists
1st place, gold medalist(s)		Sharon van Rouwendaal	Netherlands
2nd place, silver medalist(s)		Rachele Bruni	Italy
3rd place, bronze medalist(s)		Poliana Okimoto	Brazil

The women's marathon swimming over a distance of 10 kilometres at the 2016 Summer Olympics in Rio de Janeiro took place on 15 August at Fort Copacabana.

== Summary ==
Sharon van Rouwendaal of Netherlands won the gold medal, Rachele Bruni of Italy was runner-up, and Poliana Okimoto of Brazil finished third. The original silver medalist was Aurelie Muller of France, who managed to overcome Bruni in the last second of the race. However, a video replay showed Muller forcibly holding Bruni down with her right arm while trying to touch the finishing board, thus being disqualified from the race.

== Qualification ==
The women's 10 km open water marathon at the 2016 Olympics featured a field of 26 swimmers:

- 10: the top-10 finishers in the 10 km races at the 2015 World Championships
- 9: the top-9 finishers at the 2016 Olympic Marathon Swim Qualifier (June 11–12, 2016 in Setúbal, Portugal)
- 5: one representative from each FINA continent (Africa, Americas, Asia, Europe and Oceania). (These have been selected based on the finishes at the qualifying race in Setúbal.)
- 1: from the host nation (Brazil) if not qualified by other means. If Brazil already contained a qualifier in the race, this spot had been allocated back into the general pool from the 2016 Olympic qualifier race.

== Competition format ==
Unlike all of the swimming events in the pool, the men's and women's marathon 10 kilometre races are held in open water. No preliminary heats are held, with only the single mass-start race being contested. This race is held using freestyle swimming, with a lack of stroke regulations.

== Results ==
Rank	Athlete	Nation	Time	Time behind	Notes
1st place, gold medalist(s)	Sharon van Rouwendaal	Netherlands	1:56:32.1		
2nd place, silver medalist(s)	Rachele Bruni	Italy	1:56:49.5	+17.4	
3rd place, bronze medalist(s)	Poliana Okimoto	Brazil	1:56:51.4	+19.3	
4	Xin Xin	China	1:57:14.4	+42.3	
5	Haley Anderson	United States	1:57:20.2	+48.1	
6	Isabelle Härle	Germany	1:57:22.1	+50.0	
7	Keri-Anne Payne	Great Britain	1:57:23.9	+51.8	
8	Anastasiya Krapyvina	Russia	1:57:25.9	+53.8	Warning
9	Samantha Arévalo	Ecuador	1:57:27.2	+55.1	
10	Ana Marcela Cunha	Brazil	1:57:29.0	+56.9	
11	Kalliopi Araouzou	Greece	1:57:31.6	+59.5	
12	Yumi Kida	Japan	1:57:35.2	+1:03.1	Warning
13	Éva Risztov	Hungary	1:57:42.8	+1:10.7	Warning
14	Anna Olasz	Hungary	1:57:45.5	+1:13.4	
15	Chelsea Gubecka	Australia	1:58:12.7	+1:40.6	
16	Špela Perše	Slovenia	1:58:59.6	+2:27.5	Warning
17	Erika Villaécija	Spain	1:59:04.8	+2:32.7	Warning
18	Michelle Weber	South Africa	1:59:05.0	+2:32.9	
19	Jana Pechanová	Czech Republic	1:59:07.7	+2:35.6	
20	Paola Pérez	Venezuela	1:59:07.7	+2:35.6	
21	Heidi Gan	Malaysia	1:59:07.9	+2:35.8	Warning
22	Joanna Zachoszcz	Poland	1:59:20.4	+2:48.3	Warning
23	Stephanie Horner	Canada	1:59:22.1	+2:50.0	Warning
24	Vânia Neves	Portugal	2:01:39.3	+5:07.2	Warning
25	Reem Kaseem	Egypt	2:05:19.1	+8:47.0	
	Aurélie Muller	France			DSQ
