= Luca Farinotti =

Italian writer

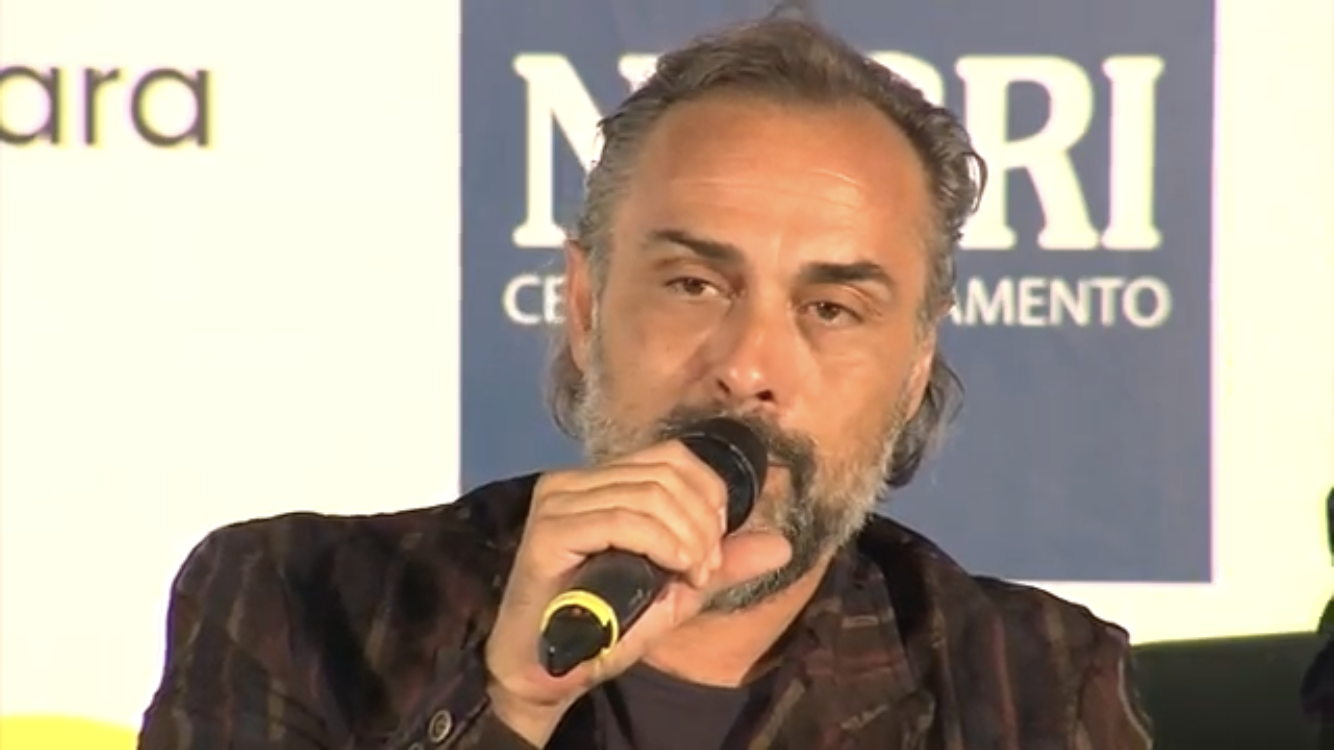
- Born: 14 June 1972 (age 54); Parma, Italy
- Occupations: Writer, essayist
- Writing career
- Period: 1995-present
- Notable awards: Premio Bancarella Selezione 2019, 2020 Bjcem 1999, 2001
- Website: www.lucafarinotti.com

Luca Farinotti (Italian pronunciation: [ˈluːka fariˈnɔtti]; 14 June 1972) is an Italian writer.

Born in Parma, Farinotti made his debut as a poet and novelist. Later he became known for his work as a food analyst, critic and essayist, as well as a sports biographer.

== Food works ==
Farinotti offers a deep analysis of the current state of the world of food (as a standardized, homologated vortex of sponsorships and TV shows). His books #mondoristorante and ReInstaurant have received the highest acknowledgments from Italian critics.

Farinotti was testimonial for UNESCO City of gastronomy; he wrote the official guide for Parma Capital of Culture Best Restaurants & Food Producers, and works for many Italian and international food magazines and journals.

== Sports books ==
Farinotti is the official biographer of many Italian athletes, including the Olympic silver medal Rachele Bruni, the tennis player Sara Errani, the women's national softball team and some international soccer players.

He writes about sport and lifestyle for several newspapers: Avvenire, Times of Malta, La Madia Travelfood, Gazzetta di Parma, Italiani.it and La Repubblica.

== Books ==
1. Lo stadio più bello del mondo, Massa, Edizioni Clandestine, 2007, ISBN 9788889383773
2. La mannaia di Kramer, Massa, Edizioni Clandestine, 2008, ISBN 9788895720036
3. #mondoristorante, Massa, Edizioni Clandestine, 2018, ISBN 9788865967676
4. ReInstaurant: decalogo pratico per una nuova ristorazione italiana, Trento, Reverdito Editore, 2020 eBook EAN e ISBN 9788834201008
5. Volevo solo nuotare, 200.000 bracciate con Rachele Bruni. 2019, ISBN 9788831950091
6. Qui e ora, sorelle!, La Spezia, Italia sul podio, 2021, ISBN 9788894530933
7. Il bulgaro che fu re di Parma per un giorno. Parma, Diabasis, 2019, ISBN 9788881039487
8. Quando feci uscire il sole. Inserto “Terza Pagina”, Edizioni della sera, Roma, ISBN 9788832213492
9. Racconto di Natale. Su ParmaDaily, 22 dicembre 2022
10. Un disegno a Katmandu, Castellaro, Om Shanti Book, 1999
11. Parma 2020. Best Restaurants & Food Producers, Parma, Diabasis, 2019, ISBN 9788881039296 (English)
12. A drawing in Katma, Om Shanti Book, 1999 (English)
13. Verso il silenzio, Castellaro, 1997
14. Elevazioni, Rebellato, 1995
15. Abbecedario pallonaro vol.1: da Aaltonen a Zubizarreta, Garrincha Edizioni, Marotta&Cafiero, 2025 (Collettivo Athletiquillo)

== Awards ==
- 1999 Theater of the Absurd - European Festival Bjcem
- 2001 Biennial of young artists from Europe and the Mediterranean “Chaos & Communication”, Sarajevo
- 2007 Premio MicroEditoria di Qualità, Italy
- 2019 Premio Bancarella Selezione Cucina
- 2020 Premio Bancarella Selezione Sport
- Dante Alighieri Society Gold Medal - poetry debut, 1992
