= Natalia Charłos =

Polish-German swimmer

Personal information
- Nationality: Poland
- Born: May 31, 1993 (age 33) Elmshorn, Germany
- Height: 5 ft 8 in (1.73 m)
- Weight: 137 lb (62 kg)

Sport
- Sport: Swimming
- Strokes: freestyle

Natalia Charłos (born May 31, 1993) is a Polish-German distance swimmer. She was born in Elmshorn, Germany. During the 2012 Summer Olympics, Charłos competed for Poland in the Women's marathon 10 kilometre, finishing in 15th place.

Charłos nearly drowned during her participation in the Women's 10 kilometre of the 2014 European Aquatics Championships.
