= Vânia Neves =

Portuguese swimmer

Personal information
- Full name: Vânia Soares Neves
- Nationality: Portuguese
- Born: 4 September 1990 (age 36) Viana do Castelo, Portugal
- Height: 171 cm (5 ft 7 in)
- Weight: 61 kg (134 lb)

Sport
- Sport: Swimming
- Club: Clube Fluvial Portuense

Vânia Neves (born 4 September 1990) is a Portuguese swimmer. She competed in the women's marathon 10 kilometre event at the 2016 Summer Olympics.

On August 16, 2016, in the Olympic 10 km race, she finished 24th out of 26 participants in Fort Copacabana bay in Brazil. Complaints of bacterial and viral infestation initially concerned the participants, but the Olympic Organizing Committee managed the issue and there were no complaints form the participants.

In the Portuguese National Championships in 2015–16, she completed personal bests in the 800 m freestyle in 8:49:53, and 8:58:13, and the 1500 m freestyle in 17:10:45. Competing in the 2017 FINA World Championships in Hungary, she completed a 5 km swim in 1:01:27.7 on July 19, 1017.
