= Ferry Weertman =

Dutch swimmer

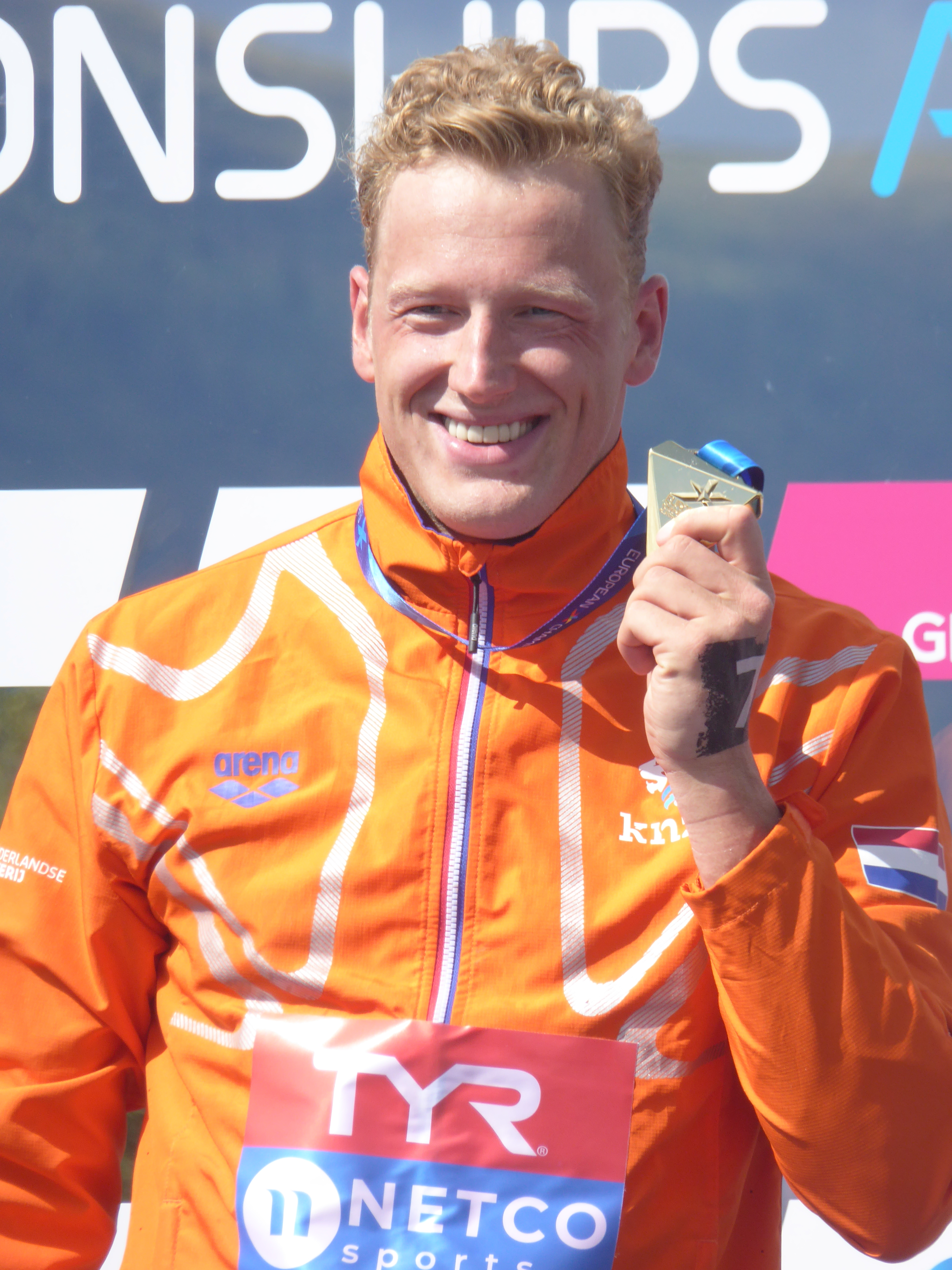
- Weertman at the 2018 European Open Water Swimming Championships

Personal information
- National team: Netherlands
- Born: 27 June 1992 (age 34) Naarden, Netherlands
- Height: 1.89 m (6 ft 2 in)
- Weight: 86 kg (190 lb)

Sport
- Sport: Swimming
- Strokes: Freestyle
Medal record
Men's swimming
Representing the Netherlands
Olympic Games
Gold medal – first place	2016 Rio de Janeiro	10 km open water
World Championships (LC)
Gold medal – first place	2017 Budapest	10 km open water
Silver medal – second place	2015 Kazan	10 km open water
Silver medal – second place	2015 Kazan	Team open water
European Championships (LC)
Gold medal – first place	2014 Berlin	10 km open water
Gold medal – first place	2014 Berlin	Team open water
Gold medal – first place	2018 Glasgow	10 km open water
Gold medal – first place	2018 Glasgow	Team open water
European Open Water Championships
Gold medal – first place	2016 Hoorn	10 km open water

Ferry Weertman (born 27 June 1992) is a Dutch former competitive swimmer who specialises in long-distance freestyle and open water events. He was the Olympic gold medalist in the 10 km open water marathon at the 2016 Olympics in Rio de Janeiro.

== Career ==
In 2014, he became the European champion in the 10 km open water event. At the 2015 World Championships he won a silver medal in the same event.

Weertman was voted 2015 European Open water swimmer of the year by European swimming federation LEN.

In 2016, Weertman won the 10 kilometer event at the 2016 European open water swimming championships in Hoorn, the Netherlands. He finished 5th in the 5 km time trial.

A month later, on 16 August 2016, he won the gold medal in the 10 km open water marathon at the 2016 Summer Olympics, outpacing two-time world champion Spyridon Gianniotis in a photo finish.

== Personal life ==
In 2019, Weertman got engaged to his girlfriend of approximately 5 years, fellow Dutch swimmer Ranomi Kromowidjojo.

Awards
Preceded by (United States) Jordan Wilimovsky	FINA Open Water Swimmer of the Year; 2016	Succeeded by Marc-Antoine Olivier
