= Adonios Fokaidis =

Greek swimmer (born 1989)

Personal information
- Born: August 29, 1989 (age 37)

Sport
- Sport: Swimming
Medal record
Representing Greece
World Championships
Silver medal – second place	2013 Barcelona	Team
European Championships (LC)
Silver medal – second place	2014 Berlin	Team
European Open Water Championships
Gold medal – first place	2010 Balatonfüred	Team

Antonios Fokaidis (born 29 August 1989) is a Greek swimmer. He participates in the open water events.

He won the silver medal in the Team event at the 2013 World Aquatics Championships in Barcelona alongside his teammates Spyridon Gianniotis and Kalliopi Araouzou. With the same team he had earlier won the gold medal at the 2010 European Open Water Championships in Balatonfüred.
