= Isabelle Härle =

German swimmer (born 1988)

Isabelle Feldwehr-Härle
Personal information
- Born: Isabelle Franziska Härle; 10 January 1988 (age 38) Bad Saulgau, West Germany
- Height: 175 cm (5 ft 9 in)
- Weight: 64 kg (141 lb)
- Spouse: Hendrik Feldwehr

Sport
- Sport: Swimming
Medal record
Women's open water swimming
Representing Germany
World Championships
Gold medal – first place	2013 Barcelona	Team
Gold medal – first place	2015 Kazan	Team
Bronze medal – third place	2011 Shanghai	Team
European Championships
Gold medal – first place	2014 Berlin	5 km open water
Bronze medal – third place	2014 Berlin	Team

Isabelle Franziska Feldwehr-Härle (née Härle, born 10 January 1988) is a German former swimmer. Since 2011, she participated in the open water events.

She won the bronze medal at the Team 5 km world championships.

At the 2016 Summer Olympics in Rio de Janeiro, she competed in the women's 10 km marathon swim. She finished in 6th place with a time of 1:57:22.1.

Before the 2016 Summer Olympics in Rio de Janeiro, Härle posed together with rower Julia Lier, cyclist Nadja Pries, table tennis player Petrissa Solja and not starting from injury reasons in Rio pole vaulter Katharina Bauer for the German edition of the Playboy.

She married German former swimmer Hendrik Feldwehr.
