= Joanna Zachoszcz =

Polish swimmer

Personal information
- Born: 17 April 1993 (age 33) Połczyn-Zdrój, Poland

Sport
- Sport: Swimming

Joanna Zachoszcz (born 17 April 1993) is a Polish swimmer. She competed in the women's marathon 10 kilometre event at the 2016 Summer Olympics.
