= Michelle Weber =

South African swimmer (born 1996)

Personal information
- Born: 28 September 1996 (age 30) Vereeniging, South Africa
- Height: 166 cm (5 ft 5 in)
- Weight: 63 kg (139 lb)

Sport
- Sport: Swimming

Michelle Weber (born 28 September 1996) is a South African swimmer. She competed in the women's marathon 10 kilometre event at the 2016 Summer Olympics. She finished 18th with a time of 1:59:05.0.

In 2019, she competed in the women's 5 km and women's 10 km events at the 2019 World Aquatics Championships held in Gwangju, South Korea. In the 5 km event she finished in 32nd place and in the 10 km event she finished in 31st place.

In June 2021, she qualified to represent South Africa at the 2020 Summer Olympics.

On 24 August 2022, she broke the South African ladies' record for swimming across the English Channel, which she did in a time of 10 hours and 21 minutes, shaving 8 minutes off of the previous record, held by Jeanne Pearson.
