= Sean Ryan (swimmer) =

American swimmer

Personal information
- Nickname: "Bones"
- National team: United States
- Born: August 13, 1992 (age 33) Augusta, Georgia, U.S.
- Height: 6 ft 3 in (191 cm)
- Weight: 140 lb (64 kg)

Sport
- Sport: Swimming
- Strokes: Freestyle
- College team: University of Michigan
Medal record
Men's swimming
Representing the United States
World Championships (LC)
Gold medal – first place	2011 Shanghai	5 km open water team
Summer Universiade
Gold medal – first place	2013 Kazan	1500 m freestyle

Sean Ryan (born August 13, 1992) is an American competition swimmer who specializes in long-distance and open-water freestyle events.

== Personal ==
Ryan is a 2010 graduate of The McCallie School in Chattanooga, Tennessee. He swam with the Scenic City Aquatic Club, a USA Swimming program, and The McCallie School, under coach Stan Corcoran. He was a member of the National Junior Team and qualified for the National Open Water Team in 2008. He is now a member of the U.S. National Team for his success in the 1500-meter freestyle and open water events in 2011. Ryan currently is swimming for coach Mike Bottom at The University of Michigan and is majoring in mechanical engineering.

== Career ==
2009 - 2011

At the 2009 Open Water Nationals, Ryan placed 4th overall and qualified for the 2009 World Aquatics Championships in Rome, Italy. At the 2009 FINA World Championships, Ryan swam the 25 kilometer open water race and placed 11th with a time of 5:36:22.2.

In 2010, Ryan barely missed a spot on the Open Water National Team placing 7th in the U.S. Open Water Nationals in May 2010. After a somewhat disappointing swim in the open water, Ryan decided to focus on pool swimming for the summer. After a month of training with Jon Urbanchek out in Fullerton, California,] and a few weeks taper with coach Stan Corcoran, Ryan's work paid off with a third-place finish at U.S. Nationals right behind Peter Vanderkaay. Ryan finished with a time of 15:04.84 which placed him at 7th in the world at the time. This time qualified him to represent the United States at the Pan Pacific Championships in Irvine, California. At the Pan Pacs Ryan placed 4th in the 1500-meter. His time of 15:04.84 was 11th in the world for the 2009–2010 season.

In 2011, Ryan won his first national championship in the 5-kilometer open water swim at Open Water Nationals in Fort Lauderdale, Florida. He finished the 5-kilometer race in 53:11.79.

Ryan later in 2011 went on to the Open Water World Championships to represent the US in the 10k swim. There he finished 25th. He missed his automatic berth to the U.S. Olympic team by placing outside the top 10.

In the 5-kilometer team event, Ryan, along with Andrew Gemmell and Ashley Twitchell captured the gold medal and won the first ever World Championship in this event. The American team beat the Australian team by one second.

At Long Course Nationals in 2011 Ryan finished second in the 1500 freestyle to Gemmell in 15:01 and is currently the fourth fastest American in the event for 2011 and the 11th in the world.

2016 Olympics

Ryan competed as a member of Team USA in the 2016 Summer Olympics held in Rio de Janeiro, Brazil. He swam in the Men's 10 km Open Water event where he finished 14th overall with a time of 1:53:15.5.

== Personal bests (long course) ==
As of July 12, 2013.

Event	Time	Venue	Date
1500 m freestyle (long course)	14:57.33	Kazan	July 12, 2013
