= Chad Ho =

South African swimmer

Personal information
- Full name: Chad Ho
- National team: South Africa
- Born: 21 June 1990 (age 36) Johannesburg, South Africa
- Height: 1.70 m (5 ft 7 in)
- Weight: 76 kg (168 lb)

Sport
- Sport: Swimming
- Strokes: Open water
- Club: Action Swim Academy
- Coach: Alisdair Hatfield
Medal record
Men's swimming
Representing South Africa
World Championships
Gold medal – first place	2015 Kazan	5 km marathon
Bronze medal – third place	2009 Rome	5 km marathon

Chad Ho (born 21 June 1990) is a South African open water swimmer, who specialises in 10 km and 5 km marathon swimming. Educated at Westville Boys' High School, he is considered one of the fastest professional open water swimmers in the world, having won the overall series title at the 2010 FINA World Cup and attended the Olympic Game's twice - 2008 and 2016. He is also currently a seven-time titleholder of the Midmar Mile.

== Swimming career ==
=== 2008 Summer Olympics ===
Ho qualified for the 2008 Summer Olympics in Beijing, after placing fourth in the 10 km Marathon Swimming Olympic test event at Shunyi Olympic Rowing-Canoeing Park. He swam in the first-ever men's 10 km open water marathon, against a field of 24 other competitors, including former pool swimmers Petar Stoychev of Bulgaria and Thomas Lurz of Germany. Ho finished the race in ninth place, with a time of 1:52:13.1, approximately twenty-one seconds behind winner Maarten van der Weijden of the Netherlands.

=== Post-Olympics ===
At the 2009 FINA World Championships in Rome, Italy, Ho became the first South African to win a medal in open water swimming, taking the bronze in the 5 km marathon, for a fastest possible time of 56:41.9. He also finished twenty-third in the 10 km marathon, with a time of 1:53:13.1, exactly one second behind his record time from the Olympics. The following year, he reinforced his lead in the FINA 10 km Marathon Swimming World Cup circuit, by reaching the top position in all eight meets of the series. Although he only won the sixth meet in Hong Kong, Ho's victory margin of 27 seconds was the largest in the series, which declared him the overall titleholder. Because of his outstanding achievement in the World Cup, and his commitment to the sport, Ho was nominated as 2010 World Open Water Swimming Man of the Year.

In 2011, Ho finished second in the 5 km marathon and shared his triumph with Troyden Prinsloo for the gold medal in 10 km at the Telkom SA National Aquatic Championships in Jeffreys Bay. Following his further success from the national championships, Ho qualified for the men's 10 km marathon at the FINA World Championships in Shanghai, China. Unfortunately, he finished the race farther from the medal podium in twentieth place, with a time of 1:54:58.6, three seconds behind Ukraine's Igor Snitko.

In 2012, Ho offered another shot for a bid to the Summer Olympics in London, by participating at the FINA Olympic Marathon Swim Qualifier, held in Setubal, Portugal. He competed against a field of 61 open water swimmers including Stoychev, David Davies of Great Britain, and Oussama Mellouli of Tunisia, who previously won an Olympic gold medal from the pool. Ho, however, failed to qualify for his supposedly second Olympics, after finishing in twelfth place, with a time of 1:46:29.4.

In 2015, Ho won gold in the 2015 World Aquatics Championships men's 5km open water swim in a time of 55:17.6. Open water swimming was not sponsored in South Africa and Ho used crowdfunding to raise the funds needed to compete.
