= Kalliopi Araouzou =

Greek swimmer (born 1991)

Personal information
- Full name: Kalliopi Araouzou
- Nickname: Kelly
- National team: Greece
- Born: March 6, 1991 (age 35) Marousi, Greece
- Height: 1.69 m (5 ft 7 in)
- Weight: 55 kg (121 lb)

Sport
- Sport: Swimming
- Strokes: Freestyle
- Club: Olympiacos
Medal record
Women's open water swimming
Representing Greece
World Championships
Silver medal – second place	2013 Barcelona	Team open water
Silver medal – second place	2015 Kazan	5 km open water
European Championships (LC)
Silver medal – second place	2014 Berlin	Team open water
European Open Water Championships
Gold medal – first place	2010 Balatonfüred	Team
Silver medal – second place	2010 Balatonfüred	5 km open water
Silver medal – second place	2012 Piombino	Team open water
Silver medal – second place	2012 Piombino	5 km open water

Kalliopi "Kelly" Araouzou (born 6 March 1991) is a Greek competitive swimmer. She participates in the open water events.

== Career ==
In 2010, she won the gold medal in the team event at the European Open Water Championships in Balatonfüred alongside her teammates Spyridon Gianniotis and Antonios Fokaidis. She won the silver medal at the same tournament in the women's 5 km event behind Ekaterina Seliverstova.

She won the bronze medal in the 10 km event at the 2011 World Cup race in Setúbal. Another two silver medals followed at the 2012 European Open Water Championships in Piombino, the 5 km individual and in the team event alongside Marios Kalafatis and Georgios Arniakos.

Her first medal at a World Championship she won in the Team event at the 2013 World Aquatics Championships in Barcelona. This time again alongside teammates Spyridon Gianniotis and Antonios Fokaidis claiming the silver medal.

At the 2016 Summer Olympics, she competed in the women's 10 km open water event. She finished 11th with a time of 1:57:31.6.

In 2019, she competed in the women's 5 km and women's 10 km events at the 2019 World Aquatics Championships held in Gwangju, South Korea. In the 5 km event she finished in 19th place and in the 10 km event she finished in 37th place.
