= Anastasiia Krapivina =

Russian swimmer

Personal information
- Born: 12 November 1994 (age 31) Lipetsk, Russia

Sport
- Sport: Swimming

Anastasiia Krapivina (Russian: Анастасия Крапивина, also transliterated Anastasiya Krapivina, born 12 November 1994 in Lipetsk) is a Russian swimmer. She competed in the women's marathon 10 kilometre event at the 2016 Summer Olympics.

In 2019, she competed in the women's 10 km event at the 2019 World Aquatics Championships held in Gwangju, South Korea and she finished in 20th place.
