= Spyridon Gianniotis =

Greek swimmer

Personal information
- Full name: Spyridon Gianniotis
- Nickname: Spyros
- National team: Greece
- Born: 19 February 1980 (age 46) Liverpool, England
- Height: 1.85 m (6 ft 1 in)
- Weight: 72 kg (159 lb)

Sport
- Sport: Swimming
- Strokes: Open water, freestyle
- Club: Olympiacos
Medal record
Men's swimming
Representing Greece
Event	1st	2nd	3rd
Olympic Games	0	1	0
World Championships	2	3	2
World Cup	1	0	1
European Championships	2	1	2
Mediterranean Games	1	2	1
Total	6	7	6
Olympic Games
Silver medal – second place	2016 Rio de Janeiro	10 km open water
World Championships
Gold medal – first place	2011 Shanghai	10 km
Gold medal – first place	2013 Barcelona	10 km
Silver medal – second place	2009 Rome	5 km
Silver medal – second place	2011 Shanghai	5 km
Silver medal – second place	2013 Barcelona	Team 5 km
Bronze medal – third place	2007 Melbourne	5 km
Bronze medal – third place	2015 Kazan	10 km
World Cup
Gold medal – first place	2012 World Cup	10 km
Bronze medal – third place	2011 World Cup	10 km
European Championships
Gold medal – first place	2008 Dubrovnik	5 km
Gold medal – first place	2010 Budapest	Team 5 km
Silver medal – second place	2014 Berlin	Team event
Bronze medal – third place	2002 Berlin	4×200 m freestyle
Bronze medal – third place	2010 Budapest	5 km
Mediterranean Games
Gold medal – first place	2001 Tunis	1500 m freestyle
Silver medal – second place	2005 Almería	400 m freestyle
Silver medal – second place	2005 Almería	1500 m freestyle
Bronze medal – third place	2005 Almería	800 m freestyle

Spyridon "Spyros" Gianniotis (Greek: Σπυρίδων "Σπύρος" Γιαννιώτης; born 19 February 1980) is a Greek former competitive swimmer who specialised in long-distance and open-water freestyle events. He is an Olympic silver medalist, two-time World Champion, World Cup gold medalist, and two-time European Champion. A five-time Olympian, Gianniotis has won a total of 15 medals in major international long-course competition, totalling 5 gold, 5 silver, and 5 bronze spanning the Olympics, the World Championships, the World Cup and the European Championships. In 2011 he won the World Open Water Swimmer of the Year award, becoming the first and only Greek swimmer to earn that distinction.

He was named the Greek Male Athlete of the Year, for the years 2011, 2012, and 2013. He won the silver medal at the 2016 Olympic Games in Rio at the 10 km marathon swim. Initially, Gianniotis was given as the gold medalist as he appeared to cross the finish line first, but the Dutchman Ferry Weertman touched the timing pad before him. After 15 minutes of deliberations by the judges and the use of photo finish, Weertman was awarded the gold medal and Gianniotis the silver, despite the fact that both were credited with the same time: 1 hour, 52 minutes, 59.8 seconds (1:52:59.8). Gianniotis won the silver medal at the age of 36, being the oldest competitor in the event.

== Career ==
He won three individual medals at the 2005 Mediterranean Games. He has represented Greece at five consecutive Summer Olympics, starting in 2000. In 2011 he became world champion in the 10 km open water at the world championships in Shanghai. Gianniotis also claimed gold at the 2013 World Aquatics Championships in Barcelona in the men's 10 km open water swimming.

At the 2004 Olympic Games in Athens Gianniotis took the 5th place in the 1500 m freestyle and the 7th place at 400 m freestyle. At the 2012 Olympic Games in London, he was 4th at the 10 km marathon swim, missing the bronze medal by 5 seconds.

Awards
Preceded by (Netherlands) Maarten van der Weijden (Italy) Valerio Cleri	World Open Water Swimmer of the Year; 2011 (with (Germany) Thomas Lurz)	Succeeded by (Italy) Valerio Cleri (Tunisia) Oussama Mellouli
