= Rachele Bruni =

Italian swimmer (born 1990)

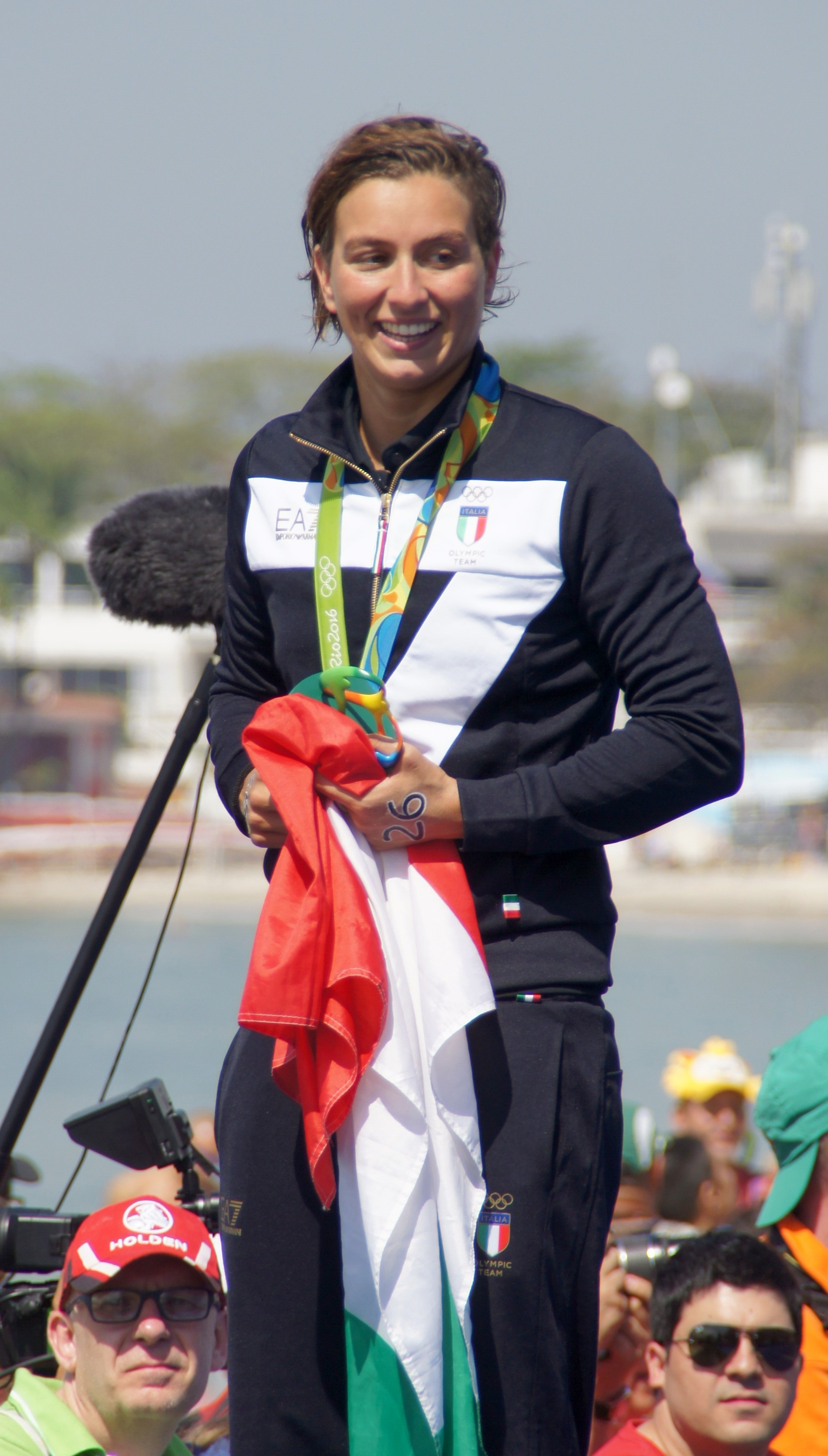
- Bruni at the 2016 Olympics

Personal information
- National team: Italy
- Born: 4 November 1990 (age 35) Florence, Italy
- Height: 1.70 m (5 ft 7 in)
- Weight: 59 kg (130 lb)

Sport
- Sport: Swimming
- Strokes: Freestyle
Medal record
Event	1st	2nd	3rd
Olympic Games	0	1	0
World Championships	0	1	2
European Championships	10	2	2
Total	10	4	4
Representing Italy
Olympic Games
Silver medal – second place	2016 Rio de Janeiro	10 km open water
World Championships
Silver medal – second place	2019 Gwangju	Team relay
Bronze medal – third place	2017 Budapest	Team relay
Bronze medal – third place	2019 Gwangju	10 km open water
European Championships
Gold medal – first place	2008 Dubrovnik	5 km
Gold medal – first place	2008 Dubrovnik	5 km team
Gold medal – first place	2011 Eilat	5 km
Gold medal – first place	2011 Eilat	5 km team
Gold medal – first place	2012 Piombino	5 km
Gold medal – first place	2012 Piombino	5 km team
Gold medal – first place	2016 Hoorn	10 km
Gold medal – first place	2016 Hoorn	5 km team
Gold medal – first place	2020 Budapest	Team relay
Gold medal – first place	2022 Rome	Team relay
Silver medal – second place	2010 Budapest	5 km team
Silver medal – second place	2011 Eilat	10 km
Bronze medal – third place	2018 Glasgow	5 km
Bronze medal – third place	2020 Budapest	10 km

Rachele Bruni (born 4 November 1990) is an Italian swimmer, specialising in open water long-distance races. She won the silver medal in the 10 km marathon at the 2016 Summer Olympics. She competed at the 2020 Summer Olympics, in 10 km open water. She won the 10k in the FINA Marathon Swim World Series 3 times: in 2015, 2016 and 2019.

== Biography ==
Bruni was born in Florence.

In 2015, Bruni became the first Italian swimmer to win the FINA 10km Marathon Swimming World Series. She won it again in 2016.

At the 2016 Summer Olympics in Rio de Janeiro, Bruni won the silver medal in the 10 km marathon, behind Sharon van Rouwendaal. She initially finished in 3rd position, just behind world champion Aurélie Muller, but the latter was disqualified for obstructing Bruni at the finish line. She dedicated her medal to her girlfriend, Diletta Faina.

She is a 10-time gold medalist at the European Open Water Swimming Championships.

In 2019, she won for the third time the FINA Marathon Swim World Series 2019.

At the 2019 World Aquatics Championships, Bruni won the bronze medal in the 10 km and the silver medal in the 5 km team.

In January 2020, with 73.9% of the votes, she won the LEN Award in the Cross-Country category.

In November 2021, she was inducted into the International Marathon Swimming Hall of Fame.

== Personal life ==
Volevo solo nuotare (200.000 bracciate con Rachele Bruni), Bruni’s biography written by Luca Farinotti, was published in 2020. The book won Bancarella Selezione Sport, the most prestigious sport books prize in Italy.

Rachele Bruni was the first Italian Olympic athlete to reveal that she is gay.
