= 2015 World Aquatics Championships =

16th FINA World Championships

16th FINA World Championships
- Host city: Kazan, Russia
- Date: 24 July – 9 August 2015
- Venue: Kazan Arena
- Nations: 190
- Athletes: 2,400
- Opened by: President Vladimir Putin
- Closed by: Julio Maglione
- Website: World Championships 2015

The 16th FINA World Championships (Russian: Чемпионат мира по водным видам спорта 2015), also Aquatics 2015, were held in Kazan, Russia from 24 July to 9 August 2015. Russia hosted this event for the first time. The number of participating national teams (190), athletes (2,400) and the number of medals (75) were the most ever amongst these championships. This was the first time the World Aquatics Championships partially overlaps with the FINA World Masters Championships that have a number of athletes (near 5,500), countries (110) and medals (635) which are the most ever also.

Competitions were held in six sports (swimming, open water swimming, diving and high diving, synchronized swimming, and water polo) in three main competition venues. The new FINA High Diving discipline has been presented on the XX FINA Technical Congress and has been officially included to the FINA World Aquatics Championships program starting from the 15th FINA World Championships 2013 in Barcelona, Spain. In this 16th FINA World Championships first time the mixed-pair (female-male) duets in the synchronized swimming were included and first time the mixed command competitions in each sports were carried. This Championship is one of the qualifying events for the 2016 Summer Olympics.

At these Championships 31 countries were awarded with a medal. The most gold medals won was by China, the United States and Russia. Also, China, the United States and Australia had the most of any medals in total. This was the first time since the 2001 World Aquatics Championships that the United States did not finish in first place in the medal standings, finishing second in the medal table behind China. It was the second time that China topped the medal standings. Also, 12 world records were set at these Championships.

== Host selection ==
The host selection for the 2015 World Aquatics Championships took place on 15 July 2011 at the biennial General Congress of FINA in Shanghai, the host city of the Championships that year. Kazan defeated rival bids from Guadalajara (Mexico), Hong Kong, Guangzhou (China), and Montreal (Canada). The last two cities withdrew their bids shortly before the vote.

== Date change ==
The dates of these Championships were moved back one week to lengthen the gap between it and the aquatics competitions at the 2015 Pan American Games in Toronto, Ontario, Canada.

== Host city ==
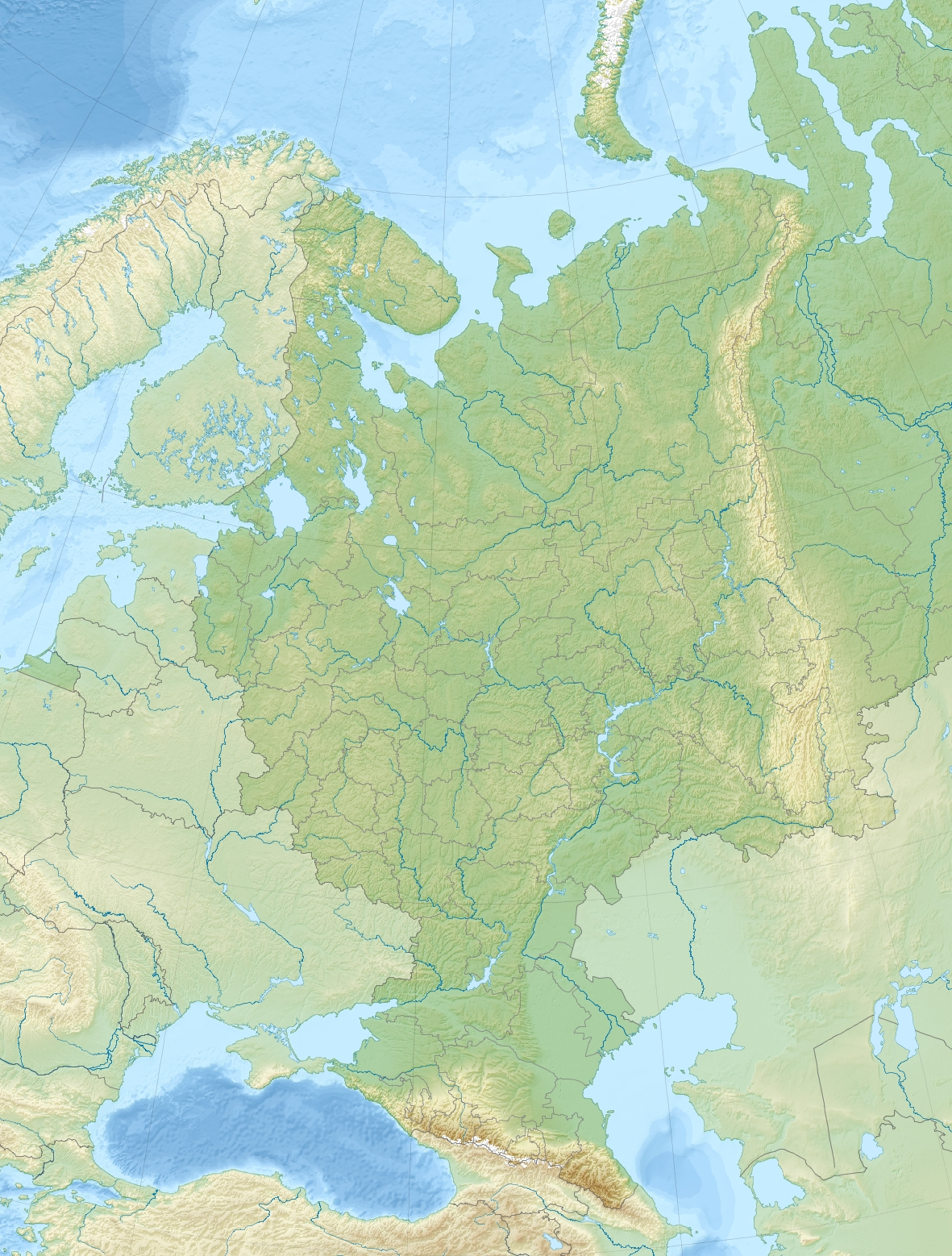
Location of Kazan

Kazan is the capital of the Republic of Tatarstan, Russia. With a population of near 1.2 million (2015), it is the sixth largest city of Russia. Kazan is one of the key political, economic, sport, cultural, religious, financial, scientific, educational, and transportation centers of Russia. Kazan is located at the confluence of the Volga and Kazanka Rivers in the European part of Russia, just one hour from Moscow by air. The current mayor of Kazan is Ilsur Metshin.

In 2005 Kazan celebrated its 1,000th anniversary, in 2013 Kazan hosted similar by scope the worldwide sport event, the 2013 Summer Universiade. As a city of unique monuments of the past (including of independent medieval Kazan Khanate), Kazan is on the list of the UNESCO world heritage cities.

There are a lot of famous professional sport clubs like football club Rubin Kazan, ice hockey club Ak Bars Kazan, basketball club UNICS, volleyball clubs Zenit and Dynamo-Kazan.

The organizing committee and executive direction of sport projects, many commercial sponsors and non-commercial partners and so-called "Ambassadors of Championships" were involved for carrying the event. Initially, half of the 6,500 members from national teams were accommodated in Athletes Villages like at the Olympics. A fleet of near 500 buses and cars, more than 400 volunteers, near 100 broadcasters and 1,200 mass-media journalists supported the event. Totally, near 1,800 officials and 100,000 guests visited the city. More than 500,000 tickets were sold on the Championship's competitions and shows. Rides by urban transport are free for participants, volunteers and spectators with a ticket for a sports competition. The cost for the Championships was near 3.5 billion rubles.

During the Championships, an open-air cultural FINA park with a capacity of 20,000 and many thematic and national pavilions were opened for all participants and guests near the main venues. The 33rd International Sport movies and TV Festival FICTS Challenge 2015 (first time outside Milano) and Tatarstan's main sabantuy were dated for the Championships.

== Symbols ==
The logo of 2015 World Aquatics Championships is the coloured and stylised map of Kazan with pictograms of the events held in the championships. Corresponding to emblem of Tatarstan, the snow leopards Itil (male) and Alsou (female) in swimming costumes were selected as mascots of championships. Slogan of the championships is Water of Life.

The medals of championships contains its name, city and date in the rim and volume host country and city and logos of the championships and FINA in internal dark blue background with live water effect. The medals are made from zinc with proper coating by gold, silver and bronze.

In honour of the event Bank of Russia issued the 3 rubles silver commemorative coin with coloured logo of championships and Russian Post produced 320,000 stamps and the commemorative booklet with envelope and stamp of first day mail cancellation.

== Venues ==
The Championship competitions hold in facilities built for the 2013 Summer Universiade, also hosted by Kazan.

Three of four main venues are placed near each other. All the venues is conveniently accessed by major avenues and roads, as well as by public transport, making it easy for participants and spectators to travel to and from the Championships. All existing venues are designed and constructed in accordance with the FINA competitions requirements.

Swimming	Main pool + warm-up pool (the main swimming arena) – "Kazan Arena"
Synchronized swimming	Main pool + warm-up pool (the main swimming arena) – "Kazan Arena"
Diving	Aquatics Palace
Water polo	Burevestnik Swimming Pool (group stage men); Olymp Swimming Pool (group stage women) temporary pool between Aquatics Palace and Kazan Arena (play-off games)
Open water swimming	Kazanka River bank near the Kazan Kremlin
High diving	Kazanka River bank near the Kazan Kremlin
Training	Orgsintez Swimming Pool, Burevestnik Swimming Pool, Olymp Swimming Pool, etc.

=== Kazan Arena ===
Construction period: May 2010 – December 2012

The usual capacity of the venue is 45,000 seats, but 15,000 temporary seats were installed during the World Championships 2015.

This was the first time since the 1908 Summer Olympics that 100m swimming pools were placed in a football stadium. On the football pitch of the stadium two temporary 50 meters long pools are constructed. Main pool for swimming and synchronised swimming competitions, and a temporary training pool connected with the competition pool with additional athletes relax and massage area.

The total capacity of the competition arena (including temporary stands) reaches up to 15,000 people. Both temporary pools and a roof in the Main Swimming Arena were constructed to meet FINA World Championships. General Requirements in cooperation with FINA partner – Myrtha Pools.

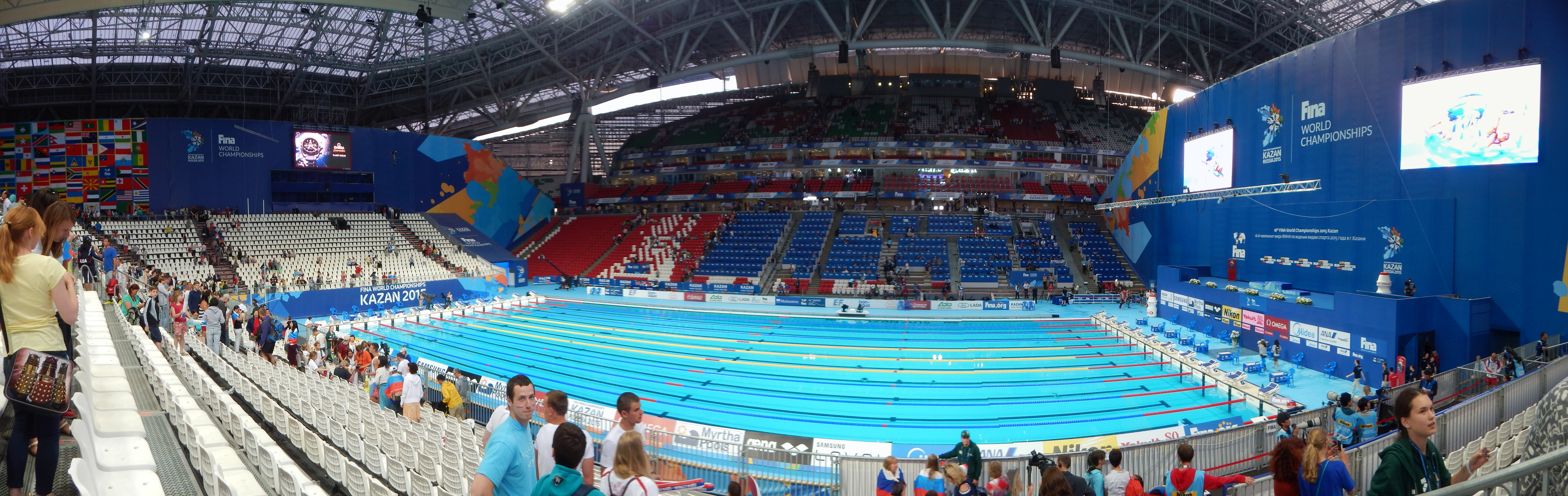
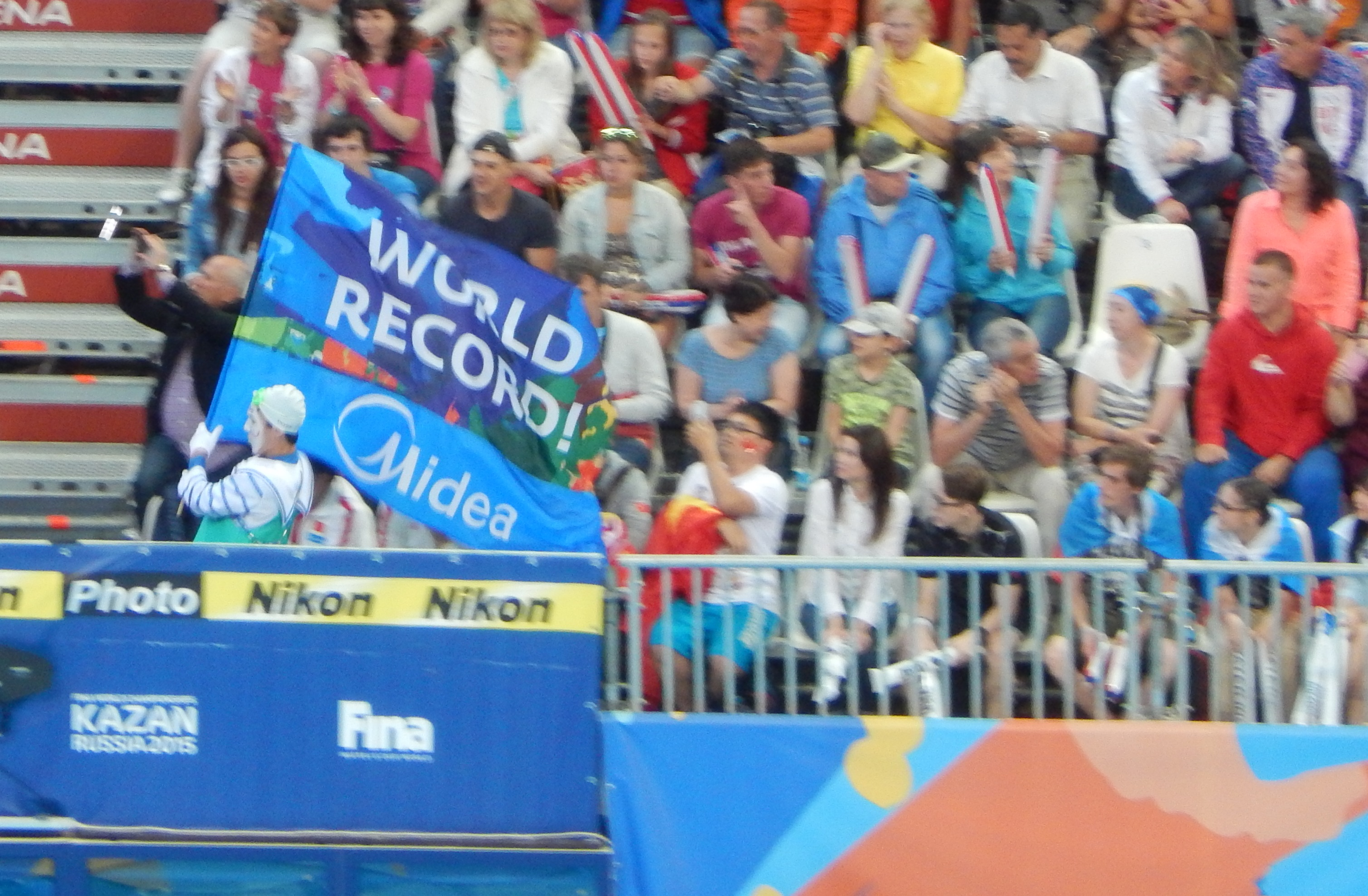
Common view and spectators during world's record at the Kazan Arena

=== Aquatics palace and arena for water polo ===
Construction period: September 2009 – October 2012

The capacity of the venue is 4,200 seats. The temporary open arena for water polo with capacity 3,500 is set near the Aquatics palace.

The building consists of three pools:

- Diving – 33.3×25 m pool (allowable operating depth is 5.5 m);
- Synchronized swimming – 50×25 m (maximum operating depth is 3.0 m);
- Training pool – 50×25 m (practicing pool depth is 2.2 m).

This special indoor swimming pool is situated on the picturesque bank of the Kazanka River. Diving and synchronized swimming play-offs are held there.

The temporary open arena for water polo with 3,500 was built close near Aquatics Palace, using its service and support systems.

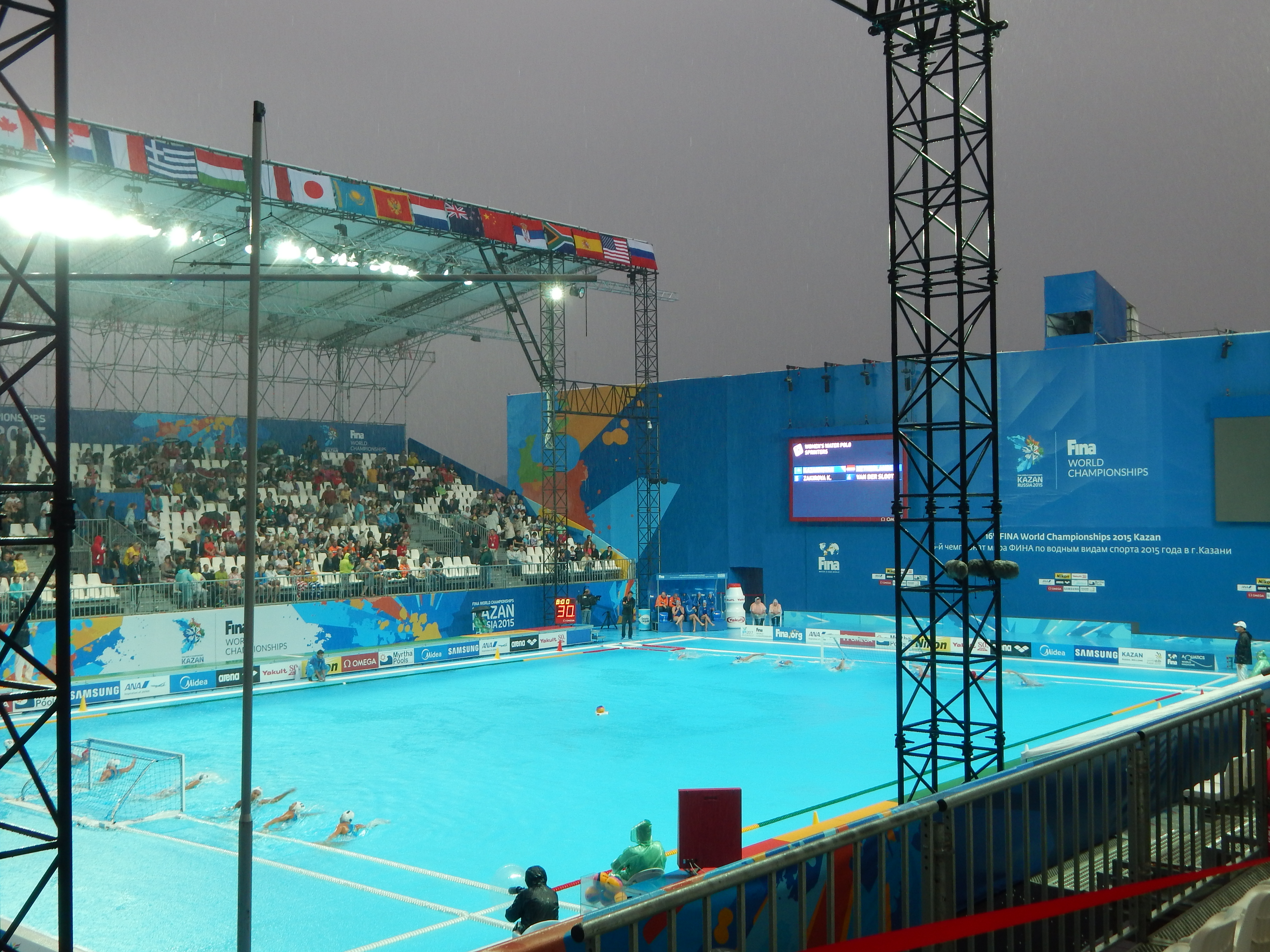
Open arena for water polo

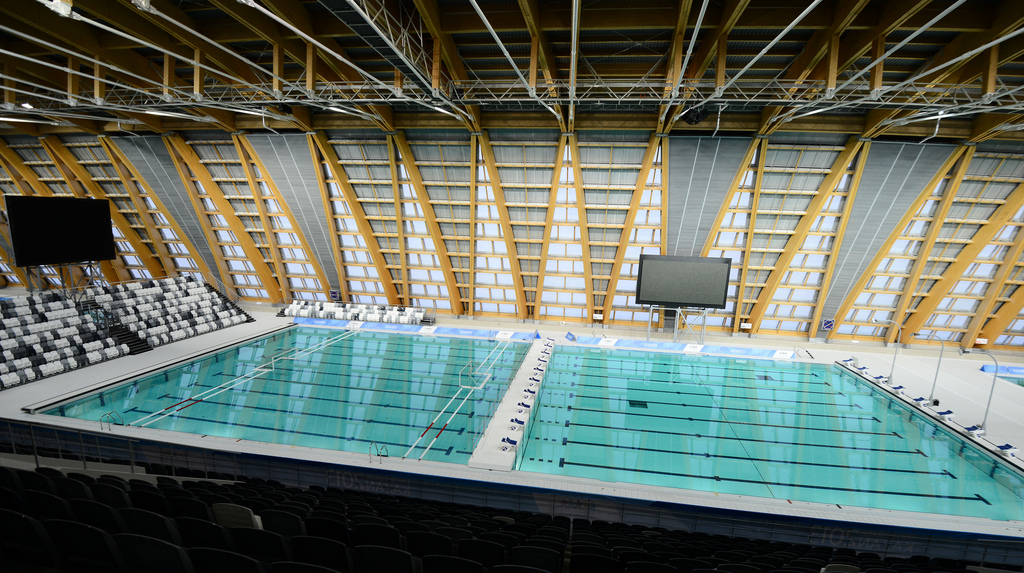
Aquatics palace inside

=== Kazanka river bank near the Kazan Kremlin ===
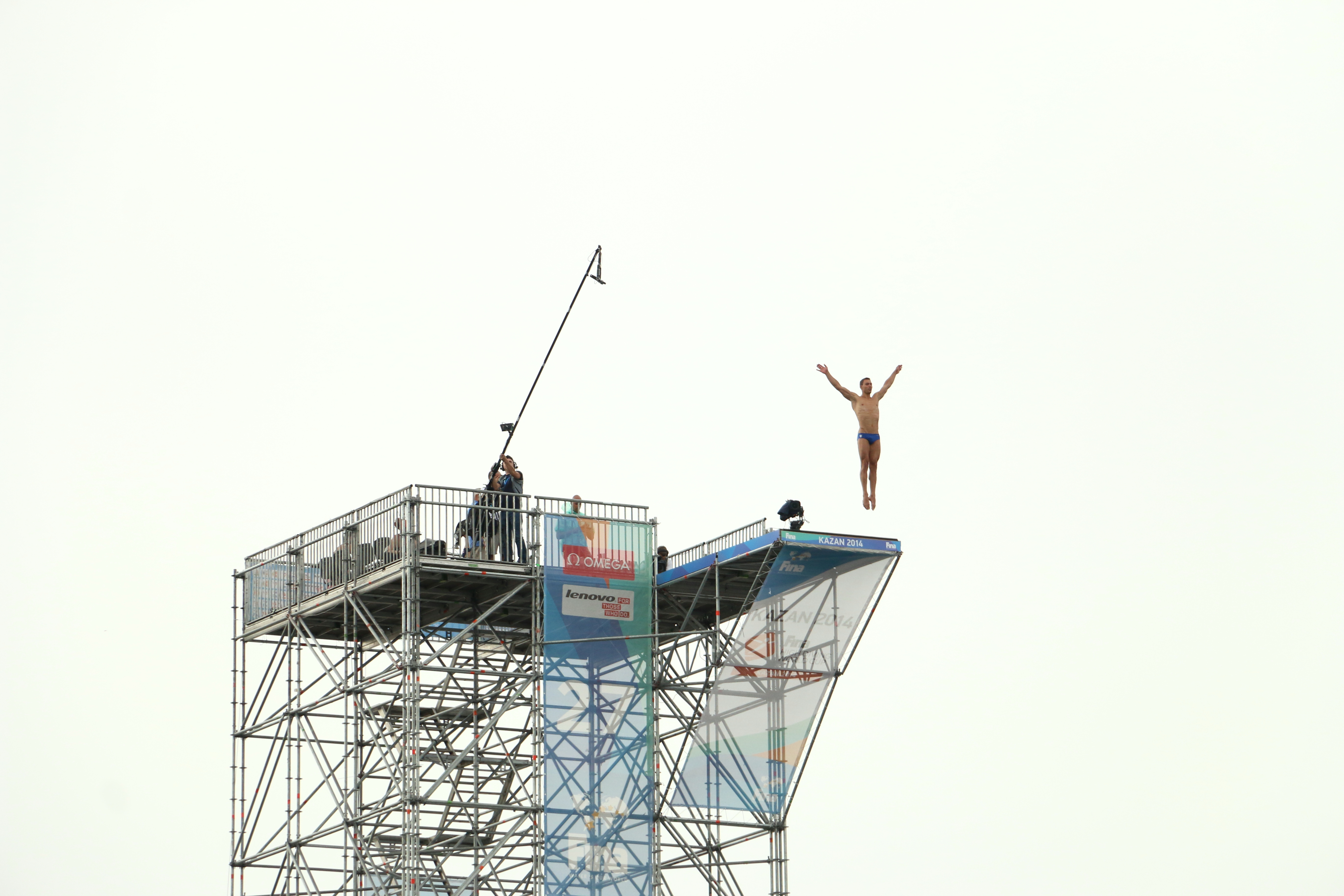
High diving tower

It is a temporary construction for the competition. The location at Kazanka River near Kazan Kremlin and Palace Square is the same as for the 1st FINA High Diving World Cup.

Number of seats: 3,000 people

Open water swimming and high diving hold. Route of open water swimming lies across Kazanka River having near 1,5 km wide at this place.

=== Training venues ===
- Orgsintez Swimming Pool
- Burevestnik Swimming Pool
- Olymp Swimming Pool
- Ak Bure Swimming Pool
- Akcharlak Swimming Pool
- Bustan Swimming Pool

== Schedule ==
The opening ceremony took place on July 24, 2015, and the closing ceremony on August 9, 2015. Both were held in some modified ice hockey TatNeft Arena. The opening and closing ceremonies involved the president of FINA, the heads of Kazan and Tatarstan, and (at opening) the president of Russia who declared the start of Championships, and (at closing) the prime minister of Russia and the prime minister of Hungary who took the FINA flag from a name of host country of the next world aquatics championships. Dozens of singers, dancers, acrobats, other artists, swimmers, aerialists and also all the spectators with a distributed coloured flashlights took part in the ceremonies. The pools, water paths, many fountains, pads for artists, dancing robots-manipulators, large multi-level dynamically changed the main, floating and pendant structures, poles of fire, vapour, virtual waterfall (at opening), large 4-faced articulatory gestured 3D mask (at closing) and other special effects were involved the Olympics-scope ceremonies. The opening ceremony first time was repeated eight times in next days as show.

●	Finals
●	Other competitions

All dates are MSK (UTC+3)

July–August 2015	24 Fri	25 Sat	26 Sun	27 Mon	28 Tue	29 Wed	30 Thu	31 Fri	1 Sat	2 Sun	3 Mon	4 Tue	5 Wed	6 Thu	7 Fri	8 Sat	9 Sun	Gold medals
Diving	●	● ●	●	● ●	● ●	●	●	●	●	● ●								13
High diving											●	●	●					2
Open water swimming		● ●		●	●		●		● ●									7
Swimming										● ● ● ●	● ● ● ●	● ● ● ● ●	● ● ● ● ●	● ● ● ● ●	● ● ● ● ●	● ● ● ● ● ●	● ● ● ● ● ● ● ●	42
Synchronised swimming		●	● ●	●	●	●	● ●	●	●									9
Water polo			●	●	●	●	●	●	●	●	●	●	●	●	●	●		2
Total gold medals		5	3	4	3	2	4	2	4	6	4	6	6	5	6	7	8	75
Cumulative total		5	8	12	15	17	21	23	27	33	37	43	49	54	60	67	75	

== Medal table ==
Total number of medal sets is 75.

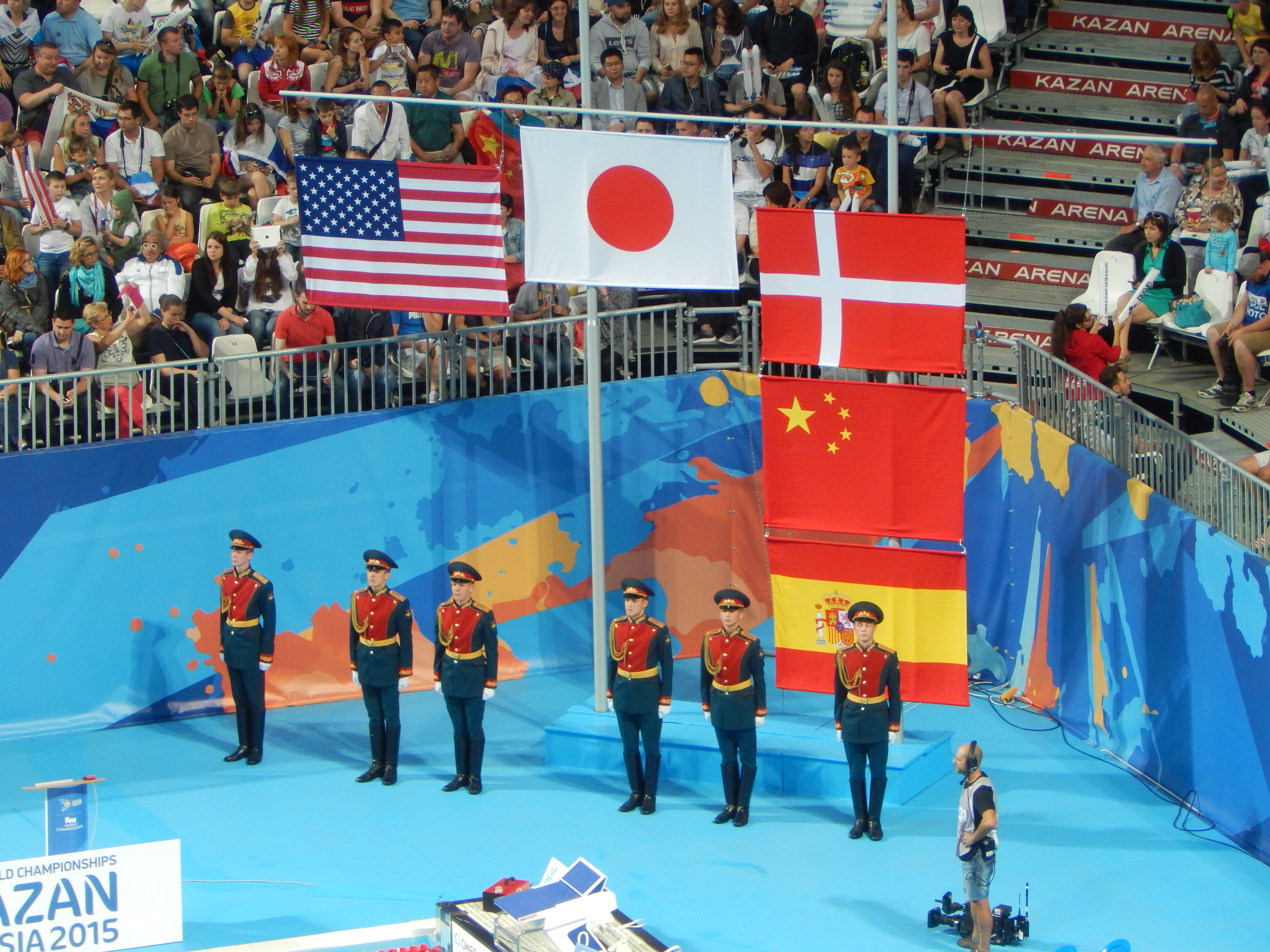
Three swimmers finished with same time and won bronze in Kazan

* Host nation (Russia)

Rank	Nation	Gold	Silver	Bronze	Total
1	China	15	10	10	35
2	United States	13	14	6	33
3	Russia*	9	4	4	17
4	Australia	7	3	8	18
5	Great Britain	7	1	6	14
6	France	5	1	1	7
7	Italy	3	3	8	14
8	Hungary	3	3	4	10
9	Sweden	3	2	1	6
10	Japan	3	1	4	8
11	South Africa	2	3	0	5
12	Germany	2	1	4	7
13	Brazil	1	4	2	7
14	North Korea	1	0	1	2
15	Serbia	1	0	0	1
16	Netherlands	0	8	0	8
17	Canada	0	4	4	8
18	Denmark	0	2	2	4
19	Ukraine	0	2	1	3
20	Mexico	0	2	0	2
20	New Zealand	0	2	0	2
22	Greece	0	1	2	3
22	Poland	0	1	2	3
22	Spain	0	1	2	3
25	Jamaica	0	1	1	2
26	Croatia	0	1	0	1
26	Lithuania	0	1	0	1
28	Argentina	0	0	1	1
28	Belarus	0	0	1	1
28	Malaysia	0	0	1	1
28	Singapore	0	0	1	1
Totals (31 entries)		75	76	77	228

== Participating nations ==
A total of near 2,400 athletes from 190 nations and territories are participating in the event. The 15 countries with more than 35 participating athletes are Australia, Brazil, Canada, China, France, Kazakhstan, Germany, Great Britain, Greece, Hungary, Italy, Japan, Mexico, Russia, South Africa, Spain, Ukraine and the United States. First time Kosovo Swimming Federation participates in this FINA World Championships.

- Albania (4 athletes)
- Algeria (2)
- Andorra (3)
- Angola (3)
- Antigua and Barbuda (4)
- Argentina (25)
- Armenia (6)
- Aruba (6)
- Australia (89)
- Austria (15)
- Azerbaijan (4)
- Bahamas (5)
- Bahrain (3)
- Bangladesh (3)
- Barbados (4)
- Belarus (24)
- Belgium (11)
- Benin (3)
- Bermuda (2)
- Bolivia (7)
- Bosnia and Herzegovina (4)
- Botswana (4)
- Brazil (83)
- British Virgin Islands (2)
- Brunei (2)
- Bulgaria (9)
- Burkina Faso (3)
- Burundi (3)
- Cambodia (3)
- Cameroon (3)
- Canada (41)
- Central African Republic (3)
- Chile (8)
- China (90)
- Chinese Taipei (7)
- Colombia (19)
- Comoros (3)
- Republic of the Congo (3)
- Cook Islands (2)
- Costa Rica (16)
- Croatia (24)
- Cyprus (4)
- Cuba (13)
- Curaçao (3)
- Czech Republic (24)
- Denmark (11)
- North Korea (18)
- Djibouti (3)
- Dominican Republic (5)
- Ecuador (6)
- Egypt (29)
- El Salvador (4)
- Estonia (10)
- Ethiopia (3)
- Faroe Islands (4)
- Federated States of Micronesia (3)
- Fiji (2)
- FINA athletes (4)
- Finland (15)
- France (63)
- Gabon (1)
- The Gambia (2)
- Georgia (6)
- Germany (53)
- Ghana (4)
- Great Britain (50)
- Greece (57)
- Grenada (3)
- Guam (3)
- Guatemala (6)
- Guinea (3)
- Guyana (3)
- Haiti (2)
- Honduras (4)
- Hong Kong (20)
- Hungary (53)
- Iceland (5)
- India (8)
- Indonesia (21)
- Iran (2)
- Iraq (2)
- Ireland (4)
- Israel (16)
- Italy (100)
- Ivory Coast (4)
- Jamaica (4)
- Japan (72)
- Jordan (6)
- Kazakhstan (45)
- Kenya (4)
- South Korea (16)
- Kosovo (4)
- Kuwait (7)
- Kyrgyzstan (4)
- Laos (3)
- Latvia (5)
- Lebanon (4)
- Lesotho (2)
- Libya (3)
- Liechtenstein (2)
- Lithuania (9)
- Luxembourg (6)
- Macau (14)
- Macedonia (3)
- Madagascar (3)
- Malawi (3)
- Malaysia (20)
- Maldives (4)
- Mali (3)
- Malta (4)
- Marshall Islands (3)
- Mauritius (3)
- Mexico (49)
- Moldova (5)
- Monaco (3)
- Mongolia (4)
- Montenegro (16)
- Morocco (3)
- Mozambique (4)
- Myanmar (3)
- Namibia (4)
- Nepal (4)
- Netherlands (28)
- New Zealand (35)
- Nicaragua (3)
- Niger (3)
- Nigeria (3)
- Northern Mariana Islands (4)
- Norway (7)
- Pakistan (4)
- Palau (3)
- Palestine (3)
- Panama (3)
- Papua New Guinea (4)
- Paraguay (5)
- Peru (6)
- Philippines (4)
- Poland (23)
- Portugal (8)
- Puerto Rico (6)
- Qatar (3)
- Romania (6)
- Russia (97) (Host)
- Rwanda (4)
- Saint Lucia (2)
- Saint Vincent and the Grenadines (3)
- San Marino (2)
- Samoa (3)
- Senegal (4)
- Serbia (27)
- Seychelles (4)
- Sierra Leone (3)
- Singapore (22)
- Slovakia (10)
- Slovenia (11)
- Somalia (1)
- South Africa (43)
- Spain (48)
- Sudan (5)
- Suriname (4)
- Swaziland (2)
- Sweden (13)
- Switzerland (28)
- Syria (4)
- Tahiti (1)
- Tajikistan (4)
- Tanzania (3)
- Thailand (8)
- Togo (2)
- Tonga (4)
- Trinidad and Tobago (2)
- Tunisia (3)
- Turkey (12)
- Turkmenistan (4)
- Uganda (3)
- Ukraine (39)
- United Arab Emirates (5)
- United States (97)
- Virgin Islands (3)
- Uruguay (4)
- Uzbekistan (12)
- Venezuela (34)
- Vietnam (5)
- Yemen (3)
- Zambia (4)
- Zimbabwe (3)
