= Spain at the 2018 European Championships =

- IOC code: ESP

in Berlin / Glasgow
- Medals Ranked 16th: Gold 3 Silver 6 Bronze 10 Total 19

European Championships appearances
- 2018; 2022

Spain competed at the 2018 European Championships in Berlin, Germany; and Glasgow, United Kingdom.

== Medallists ==
Medal	Name	Sport	Event	Date
Gold	Álvaro Martín	Athletics	Men's 20 km race walk	11 August
Gold	María Pérez	Athletics	Women's 20 km race walk	11 August
Gold	Scott Fernández; Pedro Oriol	Golf	Men's team	12 August
Silver	Jessica Vall	Swimming	Women's 200 m breaststroke	7 August
Silver	Jonathan Castroviejo	Cycling (Road)	Men's time trial	8 August
Silver	Fernando Carro	Athletics	Men's 3000 m steeplechase	9 August
Silver	Fernando Alarza	Triathlon	Men's triathlon	10 August
Silver	Diego García	Athletics	Men's 20 km race walk	11 August
Silver	Jesús España; Javier Guerra; Camilo Raul Santiago	Athletics	Men's marathon cup	12 August
Bronze	Berta Ferreras; Pau Ribes	Synchronised swimming	Mixed technical routine	3 August
Bronze	Leyre Abadía; Abril Conesa; Berta Ferreras; Emma García; María Juárez; Meritxell Mas; Elena Melián; Paula Ramírez; Sara Saldaña; Iris Tió; Blanca Toledano	Synchronised swimming	Combination routine	5 August
Bronze	Berta Ferreras; Pau Ribes	Synchronised swimming	Mixed free routine	7 August
Bronze	Julia Takács	Athletics	Women's 50 km race walk	7 August
Bronze	David Valero	Cycling (Mountain Bike)	Men's cross-country	7 August
Bronze	Joan Lluis Pons	Swimming	Men's 400 m medley	9 August
Bronze	Orlando Ortega	Athletics	Men's 110 metres hurdles	10 August
Bronze	Ana Peleteiro	Athletics	Women's triple jump	10 August
Bronze	Lucas Búa; Darwin Echeverry*; Samuel García; Bruno Hortelano; Óscar Husillos; Mark Ujakpor*	Athletics	Men's 4 × 400 metres relay	11 August
Bronze	Azucena Díaz; Trihas Gebre; Elena Loyo	Athletics	Women's marathon cup	12 August

* Participated in the heats only and received medals.

Medals by sport
Sport	1st place, gold medalist(s)	2nd place, silver medalist(s)	3rd place, bronze medalist(s)	Total
Aquatics	0	1	4	5
Athletics	2	3	5	10
Cycling	0	1	1	2
Golf	1	0	0	1
Triathlon	0	1	0	1
Total	3	6	10	19

Medals by date
Day	Date	1st place, gold medalist(s)	2nd place, silver medalist(s)	3rd place, bronze medalist(s)	Total
2	3 August	0	0	1	1
4	5 August	0	0	1	1
6	7 August	0	1	3	4
6	8 August	0	1	0	1
7	9 August	0	1	1	2
8	10 August	0	1	2	3
9	11 August	2	1	1	4
10	12 August	1	1	1	3
Total		3	6	10	19

Medals by gender
Gender	1st place, gold medalist(s)	2nd place, silver medalist(s)	3rd place, bronze medalist(s)	Total
Male	2	5	4	11
Female	1	1	4	6
Mixed events	0	0	2	2
Total	3	6	10	19

== Athletics ==
96 Spanish athletes competed at the games.

== Cycling ==
=== Road ===
Men

- Jonathan Castroviejo
- Víctor de la Parte
- Iván García Cortina
- Jesús Herrada
- José Herrada
- Juan José Lobato
- Eduard Prades
- Gonzalo Serrano
- Héctor Sáez

Women

- Alicia González Blanco
- Lucía González Blanco
- Lourdes Oyarbide
- Gloria Rodríguez
- Ane Santesteban
- Alba Teruel

=== Track ===
Men

- Alejandro Martínez
- José Moreno
- Juan Peralta
- Joan Martí Bennassar
- Marc Buades
- Julio Alberto Amores
- Sebastián Mora
- Albert Torres
- Illart Zuazubiskar

Women

- Tania Calvo
- Helena Casas
- Ane Iriarte
- Eukene Larrarte
- Ana Usabiaga
- Irene Usabiaga

=== Mountain biking ===
Men

- Carlos Coloma
- Sergio Mantecón Gutiérrez
- Pablo Rodríguez
- David Valero

Women

- Claudia Galicia

=== BMX ===
Men

- Alejandro Alcojor

Women

- Verónica García

== Gymnastics ==
Men
Team

Athlete	Event	Final							
Athlete	Event	Apparatus						Total	Rank
Athlete	Event	F	PH	R	V	PB	HB	Total	Rank
Néstor Abad	Team								
Thierno Diallo	Team								
Nicolau Mir	Team								
Alberto Tallón	Team								
Rayderley Zapata	Team								
Total	Team								

== Open water swimming ==
Athlete	Event	Final	
Athlete	Event	Time	Rank
María De Valdés	Women's 10 km	2:02:42.9	22
Pol Gil	Men's 10 km	1:51:49.3	28
Pol Gil	Men's 25 km	5:06:14.8	17
Alberto Martínez	Men's 10 km	1:49:49.7	10
Alberto Martínez	Men's 25 km	5:01:24.3	11
Guillem Pujol	Men's 5 km	53:15:1	12
Paula Ruíz	Women's 10 km	1:57:43.2	10
Raúl Santiago	Men's 10 km	1:49:56.1	17
Paula Ruíz; Raúl Santiago; Guillem Pujol; María De Valdes	Team event	54:23.8	7

== Swimming ==
Spanish swimmers have achieved qualifying standards in the following events (up to a maximum of 4 swimmers in each event).

Men

Athlete	Event	Heat		Semifinal		Final	
Athlete	Event	Time	Rank	Time	Rank	Time	Rank
César Castro	200 m freestyle	1:49.63	27	Did not advance			
Miguel Durán	200 m freestyle	1:50.31	39	Did not advance			
Hugo González	200 m backstroke	1:59.73	15 Q	1:58.43	3 Q	1:59.06	8
Hugo González	200 m individual medley	1:58.99	4 Q	1:59.28	3 Q	1:58.77	4
Albert Escrits	800 m freestyle	8:01.39	19	—N/a		Did not advance	
Joan Lluis Pons	200 m butterfly	1:59.33	18 Q	1:58.28	7	Did not advance	
Joan Lluis Pons	400 m individual medley	4:17.01	6 Q	—N/a		4:14.26	3rd place, bronze medalist(s)
Alex Ramos	200 m freestyle	1:49.50	23	Did not advance			
Marc Sánchez	200 m freestyle	1:50.22	38	Did not advance			
César Castro; Miguel Durán; Alex Ramos; Marc Sánchez	4 × 200 m freestyle relay	7:15.65	8 Q	—N/a		7:13.07	5

Women

Athlete	Event	Heat		Semifinal		Final	
Athlete	Event	Time	Rank	Time	Rank	Time	Rank
Catalina Corró	400 m individual medley	4:40.69	6 Q	—N/a		4:38.83	6
Melani Costa	200 m freestyle	1:59.01	5 Q	1:58.53	3 Q	1:58.84	8
Duane Da Rocha	100 m backstroke	1:01.36	20	Did not advance			
Cristina García Kirichenko	100 m backstroke	1:02.84	31	Did not advance			
Cristina García Kirichenko	200 m backstroke	2:12.59	6 Q	2:12.67	5	Did not advance	
Marina García	100 m breaststroke	1:07.62	6 Q	1:07.58	3 Q	1:07.55	6
Marina García	200 m breaststroke	2:26.01	3 Q	2:24.67	4 Q	2:23.63	4
Esther Morillo	200 m freestyle	2:03.09	39	Did not advance			
Lidón Muñoz	50 m freestyle	25.32	13 Q	25.15	5	Did not advance	
Lidón Muñoz	100 m freestyle	55.14	15 Q	54.64	5	Did not advance	
Jimena Pérez	800 m freestyle	8:32.46	6 Q	—N/a		8:35.61	8
Jimena Pérez	1500 m freestyle	16:25.02	6 Q	—N/a		16:16.41	6
Jessica Vall	50 m breaststroke	31.86	20	Did not advance			
Jessica Vall	100 m breaststroke	1:07.53	5 Q	1:07.08	2 Q	1:06.98	4
Jessica Vall	200 m breaststroke	2:26.94	6 Q	2:25.94	1 Q	2:23.02	2nd place, silver medalist(s)
África Zamorano	200 m freestyle	2:01.64	27	Did not advance			
África Zamorano	100 m backstroke	1:02.11	27	Did not advance			
Duane Da Rocha; Jessica Vall; Lidón Muñoz; Melani Costa	4 × 100 m medley relay	4:04.79	12	—N/a		Did not advance	
Melani Costa; Esther Morillo; Lidón Muñoz; África Zamorano	4 × 200 m freestyle relay	8:04.37	5 Q	—N/a		8:02.04	5

== Triathlon ==
Athlete	Event	Swim	Trans 1	Bike	Trans 2	Run	Total Time	Rank
Uxio Abuín	Men's							
Fernando Alarza	Men's							
Antonio Benito	Men's							
Vicente Hernandez	Men's							
Antonio Serrat	Men's							
Camila Alonso	Women's							
Anna Godoy	Women's							
Sara Pérez	Women's							
TBA; TBA; TBA; TBA	Mixed relay							
