= Hungary at the 2018 European Championships =

- IOC code: HUN

in (United Kingdom) Glasgow (Germany) Berlin 2 August 2018 – 12 August 2018
- Competitors: 98
- Medals Ranked 10th: Gold 7 Silver 4 Bronze 4 Total 15

European Championships appearances
- 2018; 2022

Hungary competed at the 2018 European Championships which last from 2 to 12 August 2018. Hungary competed in 6 sports.

== Medal summary ==
=== Medal table ===
Medal	Name	Sport	Event	Date
Gold	Boglárka Dévai	Gymnastics	Women's vault	5 August
Gold	Kristóf Milák	Swimming	Men's 200 m butterfly	5 August
Gold	Boglárka Kapás	Swimming	Women's 200 m butterfly	6 August
Gold	Kristóf Rasovszky	Open water swimming	Men's 5 km	8 August
Gold	Katinka Hosszú	Swimming	Women's 200 m individual medley	8 August
Gold	Dávid Verrasztó	Swimming	Men's 400 m individual medley	9 August
Gold	Kristóf Rasovszky	Open water swimming	Men's 25 km	12 August
Silver	Ajna Késely	Swimming	Women's 800 m freestyle	4 August
Silver	Tamás Kenderesi	Swimming	Men's 200 m butterfly	5 August
Silver	Kristóf Rasovszky	Open water swimming	Men's 10 km	9 August
Silver	Ajna Késely	Swimming	Women's 400 m freestyle	9 August
Bronze	Ajna Késely	Swimming	Women's 1500 m freestyle	7 August
Bronze	Bence Halász	Athletics	Men's hammer throw	7 August
Bronze	Katalin Burián	Swimming	Women's 200 m backstroke	9 August
Bronze	Dávid Vecsernyés	Gymnastics	Men's horizontal bar	12 August

Medals by sport
Sport	Gold medal	Silver medal	Bronze medal	Total
Aquatics	6	4	2	12
Athletics	0	0	1	1
Gymnastics	1	0	1	2
Total	7	4	4	15

Medals by date
Day	Date	Gold medal	Silver medal	Bronze medal	Total
3	4 August	0	1	0	1
4	5 August	2	1	0	3
5	6 August	1	0	0	1
6	7 August	0	0	2	2
7	8 August	2	0	0	2
8	9 August	1	2	1	4
11	12 August	1	0	1	2
Total		7	4	4	15

Medals by gender
Gender	Gold medal	Silver medal	Bronze medal	Total
Male	4	2	2	8
Female	3	2	2	7
Total	7	4	4	15

== Athletics ==
Hungary participates with 33 competitors (15 men, 18 women) at the 2018 European Athletics Championships.

== Aquatics ==
=== Swimming ===
Men

Athletes	Event	Heats		Semifinal		Final	
Athletes	Event	Result	Rank	Result	Rank	Result	Rank
Bence Biczó	200 m freestyle	1:51.12	48	did not advance			
Bence Biczó	100 m butterfly	54.53	45	did not advance			
Bence Biczó	200 m butterfly	1:55.86	3	did not advance			
Richárd Bohus	50 m freestyle	DNS		did not advance			
Richárd Bohus	100 m freestyle	49.71	24	did not advance			
Richárd Bohus	50 m backstroke	DNS		did not advance			
Richárd Bohus	100 m backstroke	54.85	15 Q	54.58	10	did not advance	
László Cseh	400 m freestyle	3:55.49	27	—N/a		did not advance	
László Cseh	50 m butterfly	23.53	7 Q	23.48	9	did not advance	
László Cseh	100 m butterfly	51.92	4 Q	51.65	1 Q	51.84	8
László Cseh	200 m butterfly	1:55.91	5	did not advance			
Gergely Gyurta	1500 m freestyle	15:28.70	16	—N/a		did not advance	
Gergely Gyurta	400 m medley	4:18.64	10	—N/a		did not advance	
Balázs Holló	400 m freestyle	3:51.56	17	—N/a		did not advance	
Balázs Holló	400 m medley	DNS		—N/a		did not advance	
Péter Holoda	50 m freestyle	22.78	=27	did not advance			
Péter Holoda	100 m freestyle	49.96	33	did not advance			
Dávid Horváth	50 m breaststroke	29.03	46	did not advance			
Dávid Horváth	100 m breaststroke	1:01.39	28	did not advance			
Dávid Horváth	200 m breaststroke	2:11.85	14 Q	2:10.70	11	did not advance	
Dominik Kozma	100 m freestyle	49.11	12 Q	49.15	13	did not advance	
Dominik Kozma	200 m freestyle	DNS		did not advance			
Tamás Kenderesi	200 m butterfly	1:54.91	2 Q	1:55.26	1 Q	1:54.36	Silver
Dávid Lakatos	800 m freestyle	8:07.51	23	—N/a		did not advance	
Dávid Lakatos	1500 m freestyle	15:33.96	17	—N/a		did not advance	
Kristóf Milák	50 m butterfly	24.29	37	did not advance			
Kristóf Milák	100 m butterfly	52.04	5 Q	51.76	4 Q	51.51	4
Kristóf Milák	200 m butterfly	1:54.17	1 Q	1:55.48	2 Q	1:52.79 CR	Gold
Nándor Németh	50 m freestyle	22.77	26	did not advance			
Nándor Németh	100 m freestyle	48.93	9 Q	48.58	=3 Q	48.55	6
Nándor Németh	200 m freestyle	1:49.41	19	did not advance			
Ádám Telegdy	50 m backstroke	26.16	36	did not advance			
Ádám Telegdy	200 m backstroke	1:58.96	7 Q	1:59.05	12	did not advance	
Dávid Verrasztó	200 m medley	2:00.94	15 Q	2:00.90	12	did not advance	
Dávid Verrasztó	400 m medley	4:14.18	1 Q	—N/a		4:10.65	Gold
Nándor Németh; Dominik Kozma; Péter Holoda; Richárd Bohus	4 × 100 m freestyle relay	3:15.55	3 Q	—N/a		3:14.51	4
Balázs Holló; Ádám Telegdy; Benjámin Grátz; Bence Biczó	4 × 200 m freestyle relay	7:18.19	9	—N/a		did not advance	
Richárd Bohus; Dávid Horváth; Kristóf Milák; Dominik Kozma; Gábor Balog*; László Cseh*	4 × 100 m medley relay	3:35.50	2 Q	—N/a		3:34.24	5

Women

Athletes	Event	Heats		Semifinal		Final	
Athletes	Event	Result	Rank	Result	Rank	Result	Rank
Katalin Burián	50 m backstroke	28.94	25	did not advance			
Katalin Burián	100 m backstroke	1:00.28	8 Q	1:00.01	7 Q	1:00.05	7
Katalin Burián	200 m backstroke	2:10.22	2 Q	2:07.65	2 Q	2:07.43	Bronze
Katinka Hosszú	100 m backstroke	1:00.15	7 Q	59.67	2 Q	59.64	4
Katinka Hosszú	200 m backstroke	DNS		did not advance			
Katinka Hosszú	200 m medley	2:11.09	1 Q	2:10.49	2 Q	2:10.17	Gold
Zsuzsanna Jakabos	200 m butterfly	2:09.46	5	did not advance			
Zsuzsanna Jakabos	200 m medley	2:13.37	6 Q	2:12.96	6 Q	2:13.37	8
Zsuzsanna Jakabos	400 m medley	4:39.26	4 Q	—N/a		4:38.48	5
Ajna Késely	400 m freestyle	4:08.77	1 Q	—N/a		4:03.57	Silver
Ajna Késely	800 m freestyle	8:27.96	2 Q	—N/a		8:22.01	Silver
Ajna Késely	1500 m freestyle	16:19.14	3 Q	—N/a		16:03.22	Bronze
Boglárka Kapás	400 m freestyle	4:14.23	10	—N/a		did not advance	
Boglárka Kapás	800 m freestyle	8:32.32	5 Q	—N/a		8:26.42	5
Boglárka Kapás	200 m butterfly	2:09.29	4 Q	2:07.75	3 Q	2:07.13	Gold
Dalma Sebestyén	100 m breaststroke	1:10.21	35	did not advance			
Dalma Sebestyén	100 m butterfly	1:00.80	27	did not advance			
Dalma Sebestyén	200 m medley	2:15.53	17	did not advance			
Liliána Szilágyi	50 m butterfly	27.09	21	did not advance			
Liliána Szilágyi	100 m butterfly	58.95	12 Q	58.53	11	did not advance	
Liliána Szilágyi	200 m butterfly	2:09.02	3 Q	2:08.70	5 Q	2:08.69	6
Anna Sztankovics	50 m breaststroke	31.15	12 Q	31.34	11	did not advance	
Anna Sztankovics	100 m breaststroke	1:08.05	11 Q	1:08.59	15	did not advance	
Evelyn Verrasztó	100 m butterfly	59.94	18	did not advance			
Evelyn Verrasztó	200 m medley	2:15.04	12	did not advance			
	4 × 200 m freestyle relay	DNS		—N/a		did not advance	
Katinka Hosszú; Anna Sztankovics; Liliána Szilágyi; Evelyn Verrasztó	4 × 100 m medley relay	4:03.92	8 Q	—N/a		4:04.58	8

Mixed team events

Athletes	Event	Heats		Final	
Athletes	Event	Result	Rank	Result	Rank
Nándor Németh; Dominik Kozma; Zsuzsanna Jakabos; Evelyn Verrasztó; Richárd Bohus (h); Maxim Lobanovszkij (h)	4 × 100 m freestyle relay	3:30.80	7	3:29.30	6
Kristóf Milák; Nándor Németh; Katinka Hosszú; Zsuzsanna Jakabos; Balázs Holló (h); Benjámin Grátz (h); Evelyn Verrasztó (h)	4 × 200 m freestyle relay	7:44.46	7 Q	7:31.19	4
Gábor Balog; Anna Sztankovics; Evelyn Verrasztó; Dominik Kozma	4 × 100 m medley relay	DQ		did not advance	

=== Synchronized swimming ===
Athletes	Event	Preliminary		Final	
Athletes	Event	Points	Rank	Points	Rank
Szofi Kiss	Solo free routine	79.2333	13	did not advance	
Szofi Kiss	Solo technical routine	—N/a		76.4918	14

=== Open water swimming ===
Men

Athletes	Event	Result	Rank
Dávid Huszti	10 km	DNF	
Kristóf Rasovszky	5 km	52:38.9	Gold
Kristóf Rasovszky	10 km	1:49:28.6	Silver
Kristóf Rasovszky	25 km	4:57.53.5	Gold
Dániel Székelyi	5 km	53:12.5	10
Dániel Székelyi	10 km	1:49:53.3	14
Dániel Székelyi	25 km	5:03:34.6	14

Women

Athletes	Event	Result	Rank
Melinda Novoszáth	10 km	2:02:28.9	20
Anna Olasz	10 km	1:57:43.8	11
Anna Olasz	25 km	5:24:35.9	6
Onon Sömenek	10 km	2:02:12.4	18
Onon Sömenek	25 km	5:28:28.0	10

Team

Athletes	Event	Result	Rank
Dávid Huszti; Melinda Novoszáth; Anna Olasz; Kristóf Rasovszky	Team	DQ	

== Cycling ==
=== Track ===
Men
Sprints

Athlete	Event	Qualifying		1/16 Finals	1/8 Finals	Quarterfinals	Semifinals	Finals/ Classification races	
Athlete	Event	Time Speed	Rank	Opposition Time	Opposition Time	Opposition Time	Opposition Time	Opposition Time	Rank
Sándor Szalontay	Sprint	10.037; 71.734 km/h	16 Q	Moreno Sánchez (ESP); W 10.641	Bötticher (GER); L	did not advance			15

Omnium

Athlete	Event	Scratch race		Tempo race		Elimination race	Points race			Total	Rank
Athlete	Event	Laps down	Event points	Points in race	Event points	Event points	Lap points	Sprint points	Total points	Total	Rank
Krisztián Lovassy	Omnium	−1	2	0	12	6	0	0	0	20	16

Points race

Athlete	Event	Lap points	Sprint points	Total points	Rank
Viktor Filutás	Points race	0	0	0	17

=== Mountain biking ===
Athlete	Event	Time	Rank
András Parti	Men's cross-country	1:40:53	40
Barbara Benkó	Women's cross-country	1:40:29	18

== Gymnastics ==
Men
Team

Athlete	Event	Qualification								Final							
Athlete	Event	Apparatus						Total	Rank	Apparatus						Total	Rank
Athlete	Event	F	PH	R	V	PB	HB	Total	Rank	F	PH	R	V	PB	HB	Total	Rank
Ádám Babos	Team	—N/a	13.233	12.966	—N/a	12.833	—N/a										
Krisztián Boncsér	Team	13.466	—N/a		13.866	—N/a	12.900	—N/a									
Balázs Kiss	Team	12.333	—N/a	13.000	13.100	—N/a											
Ryan Macleod Sheppard	Team	13.666	11.933	13.233	14.166	14.000	12.766	—N/a									
Dávid Vecsernyés	Team	—N/a	13.766	—N/a		13.166	14.200	—N/a									
Total	Team	39.465	38.932	39.199	41.132	39.999	39.866	238.593	11	did not advance							

Women
Team

Athlete	Event	Qualification						Final					
Athlete	Event	Apparatus				Total	Rank	Apparatus				Total	Rank
Athlete	Event	V	UB	BB	F	Total	Rank	V	UB	BB	F	Total	Rank
Noémi Makra	Team	—N/a	12.166	12.200	—N/a			—N/a	11.966	11.800	—N/a		
Dorina Böczögő	Team	13.133	12.700	12.400	12.633	—N/a		12.733	10.400	13.100	12.700	—N/a	
Boglárka Dévai	Team	14.616	—N/a					14.266	—N/a				
Nóra Fehér	Team	—N/a	12.833	12.766	12.433	—N/a		—N/a	12.966	12.166	12.000	—N/a	
Sára Péter	Team	13.599	—N/a		12.500	—N/a		13.566	—N/a		12.066	—N/a	
Total	Team	41.499	37.699	37.366	37.566	154.130	6 Q	40.565	35.332	37.066	36.766	149.729	8

Men individual finals

Athlete	Event	Final							
Athlete	Event	Apparatus						Total	Rank
Athlete	Event	F	PH	R	V	PB	HB	Total	Rank
Dávid Vecsernyés	Horizontal bar	—N/a					14.033	14.033	Bronze

Women individual finals

Athlete	Event	Apparatus				Total	Rank
Athlete	Event	V	UB	BB	F	Total	Rank
Boglárka Dévai	Vault	14.349	—N/a			14.349	Gold

== Rowing ==
Men

Athlete	Event	Preliminary		Repechage		Semifinal		Final	
Athlete	Event	Time	Rank	Time	Rank	Time	Rank	Time	Rank
Gergely Papp	Men's single sculls	7:29.91	6	7:21.84	6 FC	—N/a		7:12.77	17
Adrián Juhász; Béla Simon	Men's pair	7:07.91	6	6:52.80	5 FC	—N/a		6:40.38	15
Péter Galambos	Lightweight men's single sculls	7:17.76 SA/B	1	—N/a		7:09.88	2 FA	7:03.87	6
Péter Csiszár; Balázs Fiala; Bence Tamás; Dávid Forrai	Lightweight men's quadruple sculls	6:09.59	5	—N/a				6:11.16	5

Women

Athlete	Event	Preliminary		Repechage		Semifinal		Final	
Athlete	Event	Time	Rank	Time	Rank	Time	Rank	Time	Rank
Eszter Krémer; Dóra Polivka	Women's pair	7:38.30	4	7:26.96	4 FB	—N/a		7:33.37	8

Qualification Legend: FA=Final A (medal); FB=Final B (non-medal); FC=Final C (non-medal); FD=Final D (non-medal); FE=Final E (non-medal); FF=Final F (non-medal); SA/B=Semifinals A/B; SC/D=Semifinals C/D; SE/F=Semifinals E/F; QF=Quarterfinals; R=Repechage

== Triathlon ==
Athlete	Event	Swim (1.5 km)	Trans 1	Bike (40 km)	Trans 2	Run (10 km)	Total Time	Rank
Márk Dévay	Men's	16:47	0:57	57:15	0:28	33:37	1:49:04	7
Gábor Faldum	Men's	17:42	0:57	57:38	0:27	33:25	1:50:09	15
Tamás Tóth	Men's	16:54	0:51	57:16	0:25	33:27	1:48:53	6
Zsanett Bragmayer	Women's	18:43	0:59	1:05:58	0:32	did not finish		

Athlete	Event	Leg 1	Leg 2	Leg 3	Leg 4	Total Time	Rank
Zsófia Kovács; Tamás Tóth; Zsanett Bragmayer; Márk Dévay	Mixed team relay	19:23	17:47	19:58	18:58	1:16:06	4
