= Czech Republic at the 2018 European Championships =

- IOC code: CZE

in (United Kingdom) Glasgow (Germany) Berlin 2 August 2018 – 12 August 2018
- Competitors: 130 in 6 sports
- Medals Ranked 26th: Gold 0 Silver 3 Bronze 1 Total 4

European Championships appearances
- 2018; 2022

Czech Republic competed at the inaugural 7 sports 2018 European Championships from 2 to 12 August 2018. It competed in 6 sports.

== Medallists ==
Medal	Name	Sport	Event	Date
Silver	Jiří Kopáč; Jan Vetešník; Milan Viktora; Jan Cincibuch	Rowing	Men's lightweight quadruple sculls	4 August
Silver	Nikola Ogrodníková	Athletics	Women's javelin throw	10 August
Silver	Anežka Drahotová	Athletics	Women's 20 kilometres walk	11 August
Bronze	Eva Vrabcová-Nývltová	Athletics	Women's marathon	12 August

== Aquatics ==
=== Swimming ===
Men

Athlete	Event	Heats		Semifinal		Final	
Athlete	Event	Result	Rank	Result	Rank	Result	Rank
Filip Chrápavý	100 metre breaststroke	1:03.77	49	did not advance			
Filip Chrápavý	200 metre breaststroke	2:13.99	25	did not advance			
Filip Chrápavý	400 metre individual medley	4:29.48	28	—N/a		did not advance	
Roman Dmytrijev	200 metre backstroke	2:02.97	26	did not advance			
Tomáš Franta	50 metre backstroke	26.26	39	did not advance			
Tomáš Franta	100 metre backstroke	54.65	12 Q	54.63	12	did not advance	
Tomáš Franta	200 metre backstroke	2:01.51	22	did not advance			
Vít Ingeduld	5 kilometre open water	—N/a				53:19.0	18
Vít Ingeduld	10 kilometre open water	—N/a				1:50:51.7	21
Matěj Kozubek	10 kilometre open water	—N/a				1:52:34.5	32
Matěj Kozubek	25 kilometre open water	—N/a				5:03:34.5	13
Jan Micka	400 metre freestyle	3:49.17	7 Q	—N/a		3:48.46	6
Jan Micka	800 metre freestyle	7:52.14	4 Q	—N/a		7:49.73	5
Jan Micka	1500 metre freestyle	14:58.94	6 Q	—N/a		14:59.49	8
Petr Novák	50 metre butterfly	24.54	48	did not advance			
Petr Novák	100 metre butterfly	54.39	42	did not advance			
Petr Novák	200 metre butterfly	2:00.84	25	did not advance			
Jan Šefl	100 metre freestyle	50.88	60	did not advance			
Jan Šefl	50 metre butterfly	24.34	39	did not advance			
Jan Šefl	100 metre butterfly	53.98	38	did not advance			

Women

Athlete	Event	Heats		Semifinal		Final	
Athlete	Event	Result	Rank	Result	Rank	Result	Rank
Anika Apostalon	50 metre freestyle	25.37	15 Q	25.22	12	did not advance	
Anika Apostalon	100 metre freestyle	54.61	10 Q	54.74	11	did not advance	
Anika Apostalon	50 metre backstroke	29.22	28	did not advance			
Anika Apostalon	100 metre backstroke	1:02.19	29	did not advance			
Simona Baumrtová	50 metre backstroke	27.78	5 Q	27.91	6 Q	28.38	7
Simona Baumrtová	100 metre backstroke	1:00.29	10 Q	1:00.49	10	did not advance	
Simona Baumrtová	200 metre backstroke	2:13.45	10 Q	2:12.02	9	did not advance	
Alena Benešová	5 kilometre open water	—N/a				57:21.1	6
Alena Benešová	10 kilometre open water	—N/a				2:00:49.2	17
Petra Chocová	50 metre breaststroke	32.35	30	did not advance			
Kristýna Horská	100 metre breaststroke	1:11.80	43	did not advance			
Kristýna Horská	200 metre individual medley	2:16.50	21 Q	2:15.69	13	did not advance	
Anna Kolářová	50 metre freestyle	25.77	26	did not advance			
Anna Kolářová	100 metre freestyle	55.87	26	did not advance			
Anna Kolářová	50 metre butterfly	27.83	31	did not advance			
Lenka Štěrbová	10 kilometre open water	—N/a				2:04:22.9	23
Lenka Štěrbová	25 kilometre open water	—N/a				5:34:14.1	14
Lucie Svěcená	50 metre butterfly	26.91	18 Q	26.90	16	did not advance	
Lucie Svěcená	100 metre butterfly	1:00.02	21	did not advance			
Barbora Závadová	400 metre freestyle	4:14.54	11	—N/a		did not advance	
Barbora Závadová	200 metre butterfly	2:12.61	15 Q	2:11.65	11	did not advance	
Barbora Závadová	200 metre individual medley	2:15.17	13 Q	2:14.25	10	did not advance	
Barbora Závadová	400 metre individual medley	4:46.87	12	—N/a		did not advance	

=== Synchronised swimming ===
Athlete	Event	Preliminaries		Final	
Athlete	Event	Points	Rank	Points	Rank
Alžběta Dufková	Solo free routine	78.2667	15	did not advance	
Alžběta Dufková	Solo technical routine	—N/a		74.5067	15

== Athletics ==
Men
Track and road

Athlete	Event	Heats		Semifinal		Final	
Athlete	Event	Result	Rank	Result	Rank	Result	Rank
Zdeněk Stromšík	100 metres	10.39	14 q	10.37	17	did not advance	
Jan Veleba	100 metres	10.52	25	did not advance			
Dominik Záleský	100 metres	10.55	31	did not advance			
Jan Jirka	200 metres	21.15	21	did not advance			
Michal Desenský	400 metres	46.68	21	did not advance			
Pavel Maslák	400 metres	45.83	9 q	45.59 SB	16	did not advance	
Patrik Šorm	400 metres	46.52	18	did not advance			
Lukáš Hodboď	800 metres	1:46.50 PB	5 Q	1:46.57	8 q	1:46.60	8
Filip Šnejdr	800 metres	1:48.70	26	did not advance			
Jakub Holuša	1500 metres	3:49.82	24	—N/a		did not advance	
Jakub Zemaník	10,000 metres	—N/a				DNF	
Michal Brož	400 metres hurdles	50.74	11 q	50.31	19	did not advance	
Vít Müller	400 metres hurdles	51.00	16	did not advance			
Martin Tuček	400 metres hurdles	51.63	21	did not advance			
Lukáš Gdula	50 kilometres walk	—N/a				4:05:44	21
Zdeněk Stromšík; Jan Veleba; Jan Jirka; Pavel Maslák	4 × 100 metres relay	38.94	6 q	—N/a		DNS	
Michal Desenský (*); Vít Müller (*); Pavel Maslák; Filip Šnejdr; Patrik Šorm; Jan Tesař	4 × 400 metres relay	3:02.52 NR	3 Q	—N/a		3:03.00	7

Field events

Athletes	Event	Qualification		Final	
Athletes	Event	Distance	Position	Distance	Position
Jan Kudlička	Pole vault	5.36	25	did not advance	
Radek Juška	Long jump	7.87	6 q	7.73	12
Tomáš Staněk	Shot put	19.77	11 q	21.16	4
Petr Frydrych	Javelin throw	79.74	12 q	72.79	12
Jaroslav Jílek	Javelin throw	75.83	19	did not advance	
Jakub Vadlejch	Javelin throw	80.28	10 q	80.64	8

Combined events – Decathlon

Athlete	Event	100 m	LJ	SP	HJ	400 m	110H	DT	PV	JT	1500 m	Final	Rank
Jan Doležal	Result	11.06 SB	7.12	14.03	2.02 PB	49.42 PB	14.58	45.81	4.80	62.67 PB	4:41.27 PB	8067 PB	8
Jan Doležal	Points	847	842	730	822	842	901	784	849	778	672	8067 PB	8
Marek Lukáš	Result	11.12	6.99 SB	14.04	1.87	50.60 SB	14.67	39.41	4.60	64.19	4:37.03 SB	7683	14
Marek Lukáš	Points	834	811	731	687	787	890	653	790	801	699	7683	14

Women
Track and road

Athlete	Event	Heats		Semifinal		Final	
Athlete	Event	Result	Rank	Result	Rank	Result	Rank
Klára Seidlová	100 metres	11.63	15	did not advance			
Marcela Pírková	200 metres	23.72	15	did not advance			
Zdeňka Seidlová	400 metres	53.38	28	did not advance			
Alena Symerská	400 metres	53.25	25	did not advance			
Lada Vondrová	400 metres	53.21 PB	24	did not advance			
Kristiina Mäki	1500 metres	4:10.35 SB	14	—N/a		did not advance	
Diana Mezuliáníková	1500 metres	4:09.98	10 q	—N/a		4:07.82	10
Simona Vrzalová	1500 metres	4:09.11	5 q	—N/a		4:06.47	5
Zuzana Hejnová	400 metres hurdles	Bye		56.03	13	did not advance	
Lucie Sekanová	3000 metres steeplechase	9:50.38 SB	25	—N/a		did not advance	
Anežka Drahotová	20 kilometres walk	—N/a				1:27:03 SB	Silver medal
Eva Vrabcová-Nývltová	Marathon	—N/a				2:26:31 NR	Bronze medal
Lucie Domská; Marcela Pírková; Jana Slaninová; Klára Seidlová	4 × 100 metres relay	44.12 SB	12	—N/a		did not advance	

Field events

Athletes	Event	Qualification		Final	
Athletes	Event	Distance	Position	Distance	Position
Michaela Hrubá	High jump	1.86	12 q	1.91 SB	6
Lada Pejchalová	High jump	1.81	18	did not advance	
Amálie Švábíková	Pole vault	4.45	10 q	4.30	9
Markéta Červenková	Shot put	16.62	17	did not advance	
Eliška Staňková	Discus throw	57.81	9 q	57.04	12
Kateřina Šafránková	Hammer throw	64.85	22	did not advance	
Nikola Ogrodníková	Javelin throw	61.27	4 Q	61.85	Silver medal
Irena Šedivá	Javelin throw	59.34	11 q	59.76	7

Combined events – Heptathlon

Athlete	Event	100H	HJ	SP	200 m	LJ	JT	800 m	Final	Rank
Kateřina Cachová	Result	13.29 SB	1.85 PB	12.71 SB	24.25 SB	6.36 SB	44.64 SB	2:14.91	6400 PB	6
Kateřina Cachová	Points	1081	1041	708	957	962	757	894	6400 PB	6
