= Spain at the 2019 World Aquatics Championships =

- Flag of Spain
- World Aquatics code: ESP
- National federation: Royal Spanish Swimming Federation
- Website: rfen.es (in Spanish)

in Gwangju, South Korea
- Medals Ranked 16th: Gold 0 Silver 4 Bronze 1 Total 5

World Aquatics Championships appearances
- 1973; 1975; 1978; 1982; 1986; 1991; 1994; 1998; 2001; 2003; 2005; 2007; 2009; 2011; 2013; 2015; 2017; 2019; 2022; 2023; 2024; 2025

Spain competed at the 2019 World Aquatics Championships in Gwangju, South Korea from 12 to 28 July 2019.

== Medalists ==
| Medal | Name | Sport | Event | Date |
|---|---|---|---|---|
| Silver | Ona Carbonell | Artistic swimming | Women's solo technical routine | July 13 |
| Silver | Ona Carbonell | Artistic swimming | Women's solo free routine | July 15 |
| Silver | Spain women's national water polo team: Marta Bach; Paula Crespí; Anni Espar; Clara Espar; Laura Ester; Judith Forca; Maica García Godoy; Irene González; Paula Leitón; Beatriz Ortiz; María del Pilar Peña; Elena Sánchez; Roser Tarragó | Water polo | Women's tournament | 26 July |
| Silver | Spain men's national water polo team: Alberto Barroso; Alejandro Bustos; Sergi Cabanas; Francisco Fernández; Álvaro Granados; Marc Larumbe; Daniel López; Eduardo Lorrio; Blai Mallarach; Alberto Munarriz; Felipe Perrone; Roger Tahull; Miguel de Toro | Water polo | Men's tournament | 27 July |
| Bronze | Leyre Abadía; Ona Carbonell; Abril Conesa; Berta Ferreras; Cecilia Jiménez; María Juárez; Meritxell Mas; Elena Melián; Paula Ramírez; Blanca Toledano | Artistic swimming | Women's highlight routine | July 15 |

== Artistic swimming ==
Spain's artistic swimming team consisted of 14 athletes (13 female and 1 male).

Women

| Athlete | Event | Preliminaries | | Final | |
| Athlete | Event | Points | Rank | Points | Rank |
|---|---|---|---|---|---|
| Ona Carbonell | Solo technical routine | 91.8259 | 2 Q | 92.5002 | 2nd place, silver medalist(s) |
| Ona Carbonell | Solo free routine | 93.8333 | 2 Q | 94.5667 | 2nd place, silver medalist(s) |
| Paula Ramírez; Sara Saldaña | Duet technical routine | 87.4027 | 7 Q | 87.2960 | 7 |
| Ona Carbonell; Paula Ramírez | Duet free routine | 91.6000 | 5 Q | 91.7000 | 5 |
| Berta Ferreras; María Juárez; Meritxell Mas; Elena Melián; Paula Ramírez; Sara Saldaña; Iris Tió; Blanca Toledano; Leyre Abadía (R); Ona Carbonell (R) | Team technical routine | 89.4561 | 6 Q | 90.2506 | 6 |
| Ona Carbonell; Abril Conesa; Berta Ferreras; Meritxell Mas; Paula Ramírez; Sara Saldaña; Iris Tió; Blanca Toledano; María Juárez (R); Elena Melián (R) | Team free routine | 91.3333 | 5 Q | 91.4000 | 6 |
| Leyre Abadía; Ona Carbonell; Abril Conesa; Berta Ferreras; Cecilia Jiménez; María Juárez; Meritxell Mas; Elena Melián; Paula Ramírez; Blanca Toledano | Highlight routine | —N/a | | 91.1333 | 3rd place, bronze medalist(s) |

Mixed

| Athlete | Event | Preliminaries | | Final | |
| Athlete | Event | Points | Rank | Points | Rank |
|---|---|---|---|---|---|
| Emma García; Pau Ribes; Berta Ferreras (R) | Duet technical routine | 83.7049 | 6 Q | 84.4015 | 6 |
| Emma García; Pau Ribes; Berta Ferreras (R) | Duet free routine | 86.1333 | 5 Q | 86.3667 | 5 |

Legend: (R) = Reserve Athlete

== Diving ==
| Athlete | Event | Preliminaries | | Semifinal | | Final | |
| Athlete | Event | Points | Rank | Points | Rank | Points | Rank |
|---|---|---|---|---|---|---|---|
| Nicolás García | Men's 1 m springboard | 327.50 | 19 | —N/a | | did not advance | |
| Nicolás García | Men's 3 m springboard | 348.35 | 36 | did not advance | | | |
| Adrián Abadía | Men's 1 m springboard | 322.25 | 24 | —N/a | | did not advance | |
| Adrián Abadía | Men's 3 m springboard | 360.35 | 32 | did not advance | | | |

== High diving ==
Spain qualified one female high diver.

| Athlete | Event | Round 1 | Round 2 | Round 3 | Round 4 | Points | Rank |
|---|---|---|---|---|---|---|---|
| Celia Fernández | Women's high diving | 41.60 | 49.95 | 54.60 | 54.25 | 200.40 | 12 |

== Open water swimming ==
Spain qualified three male and three female open water swimmers.

Men

| Athlete | Event | Time | Rank |
|---|---|---|---|
| Alberto Martínez | Men's 10 km | 1:48:02.2 | 8 |
| Alberto Martínez | Men's 25 km | 4:51:44.1 | 7 |
| Guillem Pujol | Men's 5 km | 53:35.8 | 10 |
| Guillem Pujol | Men's 10 km | 1:50:11.6 | 28 |
| Raúl Santiago | Men's 5 km | 53:52.8 | 34 |

Women

| Athlete | Event | Time | Rank |
|---|---|---|---|
| María de Valdés Álvarez | Women's 5 km | 58:12.0 | 14 |
| Paula Ruiz | Women's 5 km | 58:11.9 | 13 |
| Paula Ruiz | Women's 10 km | 1:55:31.2 | 24 |
| María Vilas | Women's 10 km | 1:57:34.4 | 33 |

Mixed

| Athlete | Event | Time | Rank |
|---|---|---|---|
| Guillem Pujol; Paula Ruiz; Raúl Santiago; María Vilas | Team | 55:31.5 | 12 |

== Swimming ==
Men

Spain entered 9 swimmers.

| Athlete | Event | Heat | | Semifinal | | Final | |
| Athlete | Event | Time | Rank | Time | Rank | Time | Rank |
|---|---|---|---|---|---|---|---|
| Hugo González | 100 m backstroke | 55.67 | 37 | did not advance | | | |
| Hugo González | 200 m backstroke | 2:01.84 | 31 | did not advance | | | |
| Hugo González | 200 m individual medley | 2:03.39 | 34 | did not advance | | | |
| Juan Francisco Segura | 50 m freestyle | 22.64 | 40 | did not advance | | | |
| Juan Francisco Segura | 50 m backstroke | 25.46 | 23 | did not advance | | | |
| Joan Lluís Pons | 200 m butterfly | 1:58.44 | 23 | did not advance | | | |
| Joan Lluís Pons | 400 m individual medley | 4:15.14 | 7 Q | —N/a | | 4:13.30 | 4 |

Women

| Athlete | Event | Heat | | Semifinal | | Final | |
| Athlete | Event | Time | Rank | Time | Rank | Time | Rank |
|---|---|---|---|---|---|---|---|
| Mireia Belmonte | 400 m freestyle | 4:10.82 | 15 | —N/a | | did not advance | |
| Mireia Belmonte | 800 m freestyle | 8:28.22 | 7 Q | —N/a | | 8:25.51 | 8 |
| Mireia Belmonte | 1500 m freestyle | 16:08.37 | 9 QR | —N/a | | 16:02.10 | 8 |
| Mireia Belmonte | 200 m butterfly | 2:10.63 | 16 Q | 2:12.72 | 16 | did not advance | |
| Mireia Belmonte | 200 m individual medley | 2:14.93 | 21 | did not advance | | | |
| Mireia Belmonte | 400 m individual medley | 4:42.16 | 13 | —N/a | | did not advance | |
| Marina García | 200 m breaststroke | 2:27.46 | 19 | did not advance | | | |
| Lidón Muñoz | 50 m freestyle | 24.96 | 13 Q | 25.02 | 15 | did not advance | |
| Lidón Muñoz | 100 m freestyle | 55.23 | 29 | did not advance | | | |
| Jimena Pérez | 800 m freestyle | 8:32.38 | 11 | —N/a | | did not advance | |
| Jimena Pérez | 1500 m freestyle | 16:19.61 | 13 | —N/a | | did not advance | |
| Jimena Pérez | 400 m individual medley | 4:47.51 | 18 | —N/a | | did not advance | |
| Jessica Vall | 50 m breaststroke | 31.58 | 21 | did not advance | | | |
| Jessica Vall | 100 m breaststroke | 1:07.32 | 11 Q | 1:07.46 | 14 | did not advance | |
| Jessica Vall | 200 m breaststroke | 2:26.04 | 13 Q | 2:28.11 | 11 | did not advance | |
| África Zamorano | 100 m backstroke | 1:01.66 | 31 | did not advance | | | |
| África Zamorano | 200 m backstroke | 2:10.50 | 13 Q | 2:10.54 | 13 | did not advance | |

== Water polo ==
=== Men's tournament ===
Team roster

- Daniel López
- Alberto Munarriz
- Álvaro Granados
- Miguel de Toro Domínguez
- Sergi Cabanas
- Marc Larumbe
- Alberto Barroso
- Francisco Fernández
- Roger Tahull
- Felipe Perrone (C)
- Blai Mallarach
- Alejandro Bustos
- Eduardo Lorrio
- Coach: David Martín

Group C

| Pos | Team | Pld | W | D | L | GF | GA | GD | Pts | Qualification |
|---|---|---|---|---|---|---|---|---|---|---|
| 1 | Hungary | 3 | 3 | 0 | 0 | 60 | 20 | +40 | 6 | Quarterfinals |
| 2 | Spain | 3 | 2 | 0 | 1 | 57 | 19 | +38 | 4 | Playoffs |
| 3 | South Africa | 3 | 0 | 1 | 2 | 16 | 54 | −38 | 1 | Playoffs |
| 4 | New Zealand | 3 | 0 | 1 | 2 | 15 | 55 | −40 | 1 | |

Source: Sportresult
Rules for classification: 1) points; 2) head-to-head points; 3) head-to-head goal difference; 4) head-to-head number of goals scored; 5) Goal difference.

| 15 July 2019; 16:30 | Report | South Africa | 3–23 | Spain | Nambu University Aquatics Center, Gwangju; Referees: John Waldow (NZL), Vojin Putniković (SRB) |
| 15 July 2019; 16:30 | Report | Score by quarters: 1–6, 1–5, 1–4, 0–8 | | | Nambu University Aquatics Center, Gwangju; Referees: John Waldow (NZL), Vojin Putniković (SRB) |
| 15 July 2019; 16:30 | Report | Rodda 2 | Goals | Mallarach 5 | Nambu University Aquatics Center, Gwangju; Referees: John Waldow (NZL), Vojin Putniković (SRB) |

| 17 July 2019; 11:10 | Report | Hungary | 13–11 | Spain | Nambu University Aquatics Center, Gwangju; Referees: Boris Margenta (SLO), Michael Goldenberg (USA) |
| 17 July 2019; 11:10 | Report | Score by quarters: 4–2, 5–4, 3–0, 1–5 | | | Nambu University Aquatics Center, Gwangju; Referees: Boris Margenta (SLO), Michael Goldenberg (USA) |
| 17 July 2019; 11:10 | Report | Zalánki 3 | Goals | Granados 3 | Nambu University Aquatics Center, Gwangju; Referees: Boris Margenta (SLO), Michael Goldenberg (USA) |

| 19 July 2019; 09:50 | Report | New Zealand | 3–23 | Spain | Nambu University Aquatics Center, Gwangju; Referees: Jeremy Cheng (SGP), Vojin Putniković (SRB) |
| 19 July 2019; 09:50 | Report | Score by quarters: 0–8, 1–5, 1–7, 1–3 | | | Nambu University Aquatics Center, Gwangju; Referees: Jeremy Cheng (SGP), Vojin Putniković (SRB) |
| 19 July 2019; 09:50 | Report | three players 1 | Goals | Barosso 6 | Nambu University Aquatics Center, Gwangju; Referees: Jeremy Cheng (SGP), Vojin Putniković (SRB) |

Playoffs

| 21 July 2019; 17:00 | Report | Spain | 15–7 | Japan | Nambu University Aquatics Center, Gwangju; Referees: Arkadiy Voevodin (RUS), Dion Willis (RSA) |
| 21 July 2019; 17:00 | Report | Score by quarters: 2–1, 3–3, 4–2, 6–1 | | | Nambu University Aquatics Center, Gwangju; Referees: Arkadiy Voevodin (RUS), Dion Willis (RSA) |
| 21 July 2019; 17:00 | Report | Munarriz 6 | Goals | Adachi 2 | Nambu University Aquatics Center, Gwangju; Referees: Arkadiy Voevodin (RUS), Dion Willis (RSA) |

Quarterfinals

| 23 July 2019; 14:00 | Report | Serbia | 9–12 | Spain | Nambu University Aquatics Center, Gwangju; Referees: Georgios Stavridis (GRE), Michiel Zwart (NED) |
| 23 July 2019; 14:00 | Report | Score by quarters: 1–2, 2–5, 4–3, 2–2 | | | Nambu University Aquatics Center, Gwangju; Referees: Georgios Stavridis (GRE), Michiel Zwart (NED) |
| 23 July 2019; 14:00 | Report | Rašović 4 | Goals | three players 2 | Nambu University Aquatics Center, Gwangju; Referees: Georgios Stavridis (GRE), Michiel Zwart (NED) |

Semifinals

| 25 July 2019; 17:00 | Report | Spain | 6–5 | Croatia | Nambu University Aquatics Center, Gwangju; Referees: Georgios Stavridis (GRE), Adrian Alexandrescu (ROU) |
| 25 July 2019; 17:00 | Report | Score by quarters: 2–1, 2–1, 2–0, 0–3 | | | Nambu University Aquatics Center, Gwangju; Referees: Georgios Stavridis (GRE), Adrian Alexandrescu (ROU) |
| 25 July 2019; 17:00 | Report | Mallarach 2 | Goals | Joković 3 | Nambu University Aquatics Center, Gwangju; Referees: Georgios Stavridis (GRE), Adrian Alexandrescu (ROU) |

Final

| 27 July 2019; 18:30 | Report | Spain | 5–10 | Italy | Nambu University Aquatics Center, Gwangju; Referees: Boris Margeta (SLO), Michael Goldenberg (USA) |
| 27 July 2019; 18:30 | Report | Score by quarters: 2–2, 1–3, 1–3, 1–2 | | | Nambu University Aquatics Center, Gwangju; Referees: Boris Margeta (SLO), Michael Goldenberg (USA) |
| 27 July 2019; 18:30 | Report | Perrone 2 | Goals | Dolce 2 | Nambu University Aquatics Center, Gwangju; Referees: Boris Margeta (SLO), Michael Goldenberg (USA) |

=== Women's tournament ===
Team roster

- Laura Ester
- Marta Bach
- Anni Espar
- Beatriz Ortiz
- Roser Tarragó
- Irene González
- Clara Espar
- María del Pilar Peña (C)
- Judith Forca
- Paula Crespí
- Maica García Godoy
- Paula Leitón
- Elena Sánchez
- Coach: Miki Oca

Group C

| Pos | Team | Pld | W | D | L | GF | GA | GD | Pts | Qualification |
|---|---|---|---|---|---|---|---|---|---|---|
| 1 | Spain | 3 | 3 | 0 | 0 | 51 | 16 | +35 | 6 | Quarterfinals |
| 2 | Greece | 3 | 2 | 0 | 1 | 37 | 25 | +12 | 4 | Playoffs |
| 3 | Kazakhstan | 3 | 1 | 0 | 2 | 22 | 37 | −15 | 2 | Playoffs |
| 4 | Cuba | 3 | 0 | 0 | 3 | 16 | 48 | −32 | 0 | |

Updated to match(es) played on 18 July 2019. Source: Sportresult
Rules for classification: 1) points; 2) head-to-head points; 3) head-to-head goal difference; 4) head-to-head number of goals scored; 5) Goal difference.

| 14 July 2019; 17:50 | Report | Greece | 4–14 | Spain | Nambu University Aquatics Center, Gwangju; Referees: Boris Margeta (SLO), Michiel Zwart (NED) |
| 14 July 2019; 17:50 | Report | Score by quarters: 1–6, 2–2, 0–3, 1–3 | | | Nambu University Aquatics Center, Gwangju; Referees: Boris Margeta (SLO), Michiel Zwart (NED) |
| 14 July 2019; 17:50 | Report | four players 1 | Goals | Tarragó 6 | Nambu University Aquatics Center, Gwangju; Referees: Boris Margeta (SLO), Michiel Zwart (NED) |

| 16 July 2019; 11:10 | Report | Spain | 18–6 | Kazakhstan | Nambu University Aquatics Center, Gwangju; Referees: Germán Moller (ARG), Michiel Zwart (NED) |
| 16 July 2019; 11:10 | Report | Score by quarters: 3–1, 7–3, 3–1, 5–1 | | | Nambu University Aquatics Center, Gwangju; Referees: Germán Moller (ARG), Michiel Zwart (NED) |
| 16 July 2019; 11:10 | Report | three players 3 | Goals | Mirshina, Yeremina 2 | Nambu University Aquatics Center, Gwangju; Referees: Germán Moller (ARG), Michiel Zwart (NED) |

| 18 July 2019; 08:30 | Report | Cuba | 6–19 | Spain | Nambu University Aquatics Center, Gwangju; Referees: Germán Moller (ARG), Jeremy Cheng (SGP) |
| 18 July 2019; 08:30 | Report | Score by quarters: 0–7, 1–6, 4–3, 1–3 | | | Nambu University Aquatics Center, Gwangju; Referees: Germán Moller (ARG), Jeremy Cheng (SGP) |
| 18 July 2019; 08:30 | Report | Bernal 3 | Goals | two players 4 | Nambu University Aquatics Center, Gwangju; Referees: Germán Moller (ARG), Jeremy Cheng (SGP) |

Quarterfinals

| 22 July 2019; 17:00 | Report | Spain | 12–8 | Netherlands | Nambu University Aquatics Center, Gwangju; Referees: Marie-Claude Deslieres (CAN), Nenad Peris (CRO) |
| 22 July 2019; 17:00 | Report | Score by quarters: 6–1, 2–3, 2–1, 2–3 | | | Nambu University Aquatics Center, Gwangju; Referees: Marie-Claude Deslieres (CAN), Nenad Peris (CRO) |
| 22 July 2019; 17:00 | Report | A. Espar, García 4 | Goals | van der Sloot 3 | Nambu University Aquatics Center, Gwangju; Referees: Marie-Claude Deslieres (CAN), Nenad Peris (CRO) |

Semifinals

| 24 July 2019; 18:30 | Report | Spain | 16–10 | Hungary | Nambu University Aquatics Center, Gwangju; Referees: Georgios Stavridis (GRE), Boris Margeta (SLO) |
| 24 July 2019; 18:30 | Report | Score by quarters: 5–3, 5–5, 4–1, 2–1 | | | Nambu University Aquatics Center, Gwangju; Referees: Georgios Stavridis (GRE), Boris Margeta (SLO) |
| 24 July 2019; 18:30 | Report | Tarragó, Forca 4 | Goals | Leimeter 4 | Nambu University Aquatics Center, Gwangju; Referees: Georgios Stavridis (GRE), Boris Margeta (SLO) |

Final

| 26 July 2019; 18:30 | Report | United States | 11–6 | Spain | Nambu University Aquatics Center, Gwangju; Referees: Michiel Zwart (NED), Nenad Peris (CRO) |
| 26 July 2019; 18:30 | Report | Score by quarters: 3–1, 2–2, 4–0, 2–3 | | | Nambu University Aquatics Center, Gwangju; Referees: Michiel Zwart (NED), Nenad Peris (CRO) |
| 26 July 2019; 18:30 | Report | Neushul 3 | Goals | Tarragó 3 | Nambu University Aquatics Center, Gwangju; Referees: Michiel Zwart (NED), Nenad Peris (CRO) |
