= Italy at the 2018 European Championships =

- WA code: ITA

in (United Kingdom) Glasgow (Germany) Berlin 2 August 2018 – 12 August 2018
- Competitors: 295 (164 men, 131 women)
- Medals Ranked 3rd: Gold 15 Silver 17 Bronze 28 Total 60

European Championships appearances
- 2018; 2022

Italy competes at the 2018 European Championships in Berlin, Germany; and Glasgow, United Kingdom from 2 to 12 August 2018 in 7 sports.

== Medals ==
In the table the official medal table of the 2018 European Championships.

Sport	Gold	Silver	Bronze	Total
Aquatics	8	12	19	39
Cycling	4	3	1	8
Rowing	2	1	3	6
Athletics	1	1	4	6
Golf	0	0	1	1
Artistic gymnastics	0	0	0	0
Triathlon	0	0	0	0
Totals (7 entries)	15	17	28	60

Medals by date
Day	Date	Gold medal	Silver medal	Bronze medal	Total
1	2 August	-	-	-	-
2	3 August	1	4	1	6
3	4 August	4	1	3	8
4	5 August	2	2	6	10
5	6 August	1	0	5	6
6	7 August	0	4	3	7
7	8 August	0	4	2	6
8	9 August	3	1	3	7
9	10 August	0	0	1	1
10	11 August	0	0	1	1
11	12 August	4	1	3	6
Total		15	17	28	60

== Athletics ==
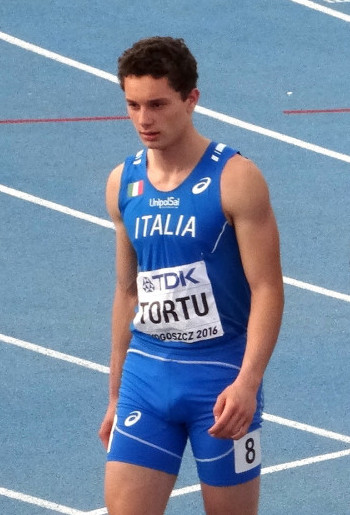
Filippo Tortu, the tip of the Italian national athletics team.

Italy participates with 91 competitors (51 men, 40 women) at the 2018 European Athletics Championships.

Medals

Medal	Date	Event	Athlete
Bronze	7 August	Men's 10,000 m	Yeman Crippa
Bronze	9 August	Men's 3000 m steeplechase	Yohanes Chiappinelli
Bronze	11 August	Women's 20 km walk	Antonella Palmisano
Silver	12 August	Women's Marathon Cup	Sara Dossena; Catherine Bertone; Fatna Maraoui
Bronze	12 August	Men's marathon	Yassine Rachik
Gold	12 August	Men's Marathon Cup	Yassine Rachik; Eyob Faniel; Stefano La Rosa

== Aquatics ==
=== Swimming ===
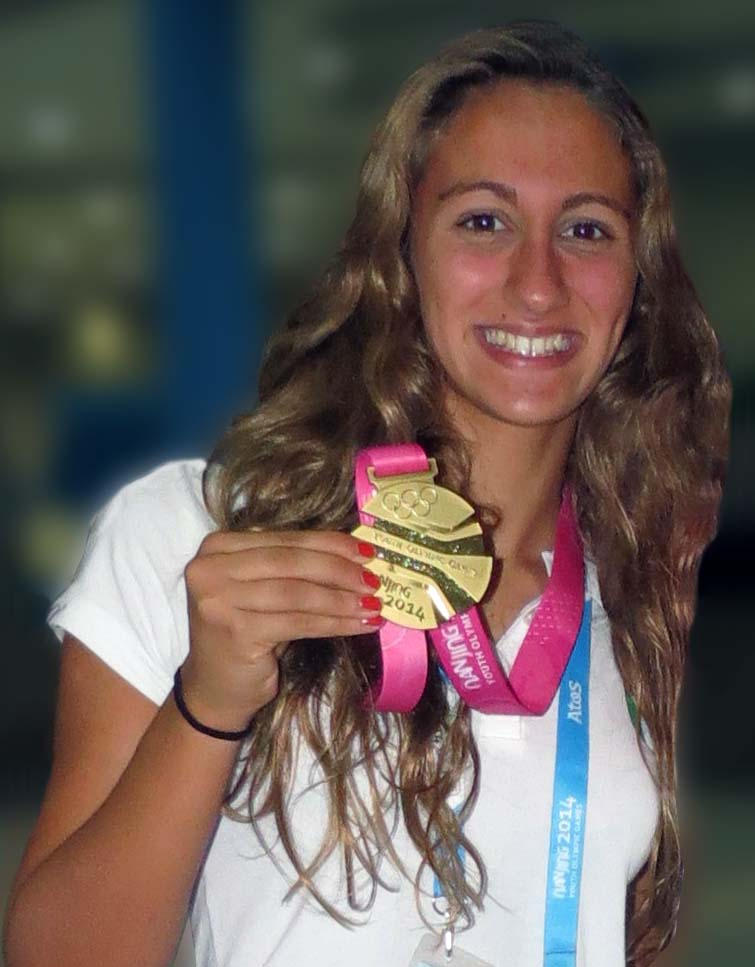
Simona Quadarella three individual gold medals at these Championships.

Medals

Medal	Date	Event	Athlete
Silver	3 August	Men's 4 × 100 m freestyle	Luca Dotto; Ivano Vendrame; Lorenzo Zazzeri; Alessandro Miressi
Silver	3 August	Women's 400 m medley	Ilaria Cusinato
Gold	4 August	Women's 800 m freestyle	Simona Quadarella
Bronze	4 August	Women's 100 m butterfly	Elena Di Liddo
Bronze	5 August	Men's 1500 m freestyle	Gregorio Paltrinieri
Gold	5 August	Men's 100 m freestyle	Alessandro Miressi
Bronze	5 August	Women's 100 m breaststroke	Arianna Castiglioni
Bronze	5 August	Men's 200 m butterfly	Federico Burdisso
Bronze	5 August	Men's 4 × 200 m freestyle	Alessio Proietti Colonna; Filippo Megli; Matteo Ciampi; Mattia Zuin
Bronze	6 August	Men's 200 m butterfly	Luca Pizzini
Bronze	6 August	Mixed 4 × 100 m medley relay	Margherita Panziera; Fabio Scozzoli; Elena Di Liddo; Alessandro Miressi; Matteo Restivo; Arianna Castiglioni; Luca Dotto
Gold	7 August	Women's 1500 m freestyle	Simona Quadarella
Bronze	7 August	Women's 100 m backstroke	Carlotta Zofkova
Silver	8 August	Men's 800 m freestyle	Gregorio Paltrinieri
Silver	8 August	Men's 50 m breaststroke	Fabio Scozzoli
Bronze	8 August	Men's 200 m backstroke	Matteo Restivo
Silver	8 August	Women's 200 m medley	Ilaria Cusinato
Bronze	9 August	Men's 50 m freestyle	Andrea Vergani
Bronze	9 August	Women's 50 m breaststroke	Arianna Castiglioni
Gold	9 August	Men's 100 m backstroke	Piero Codia
Gold	9 August	Women's 200 m backstroke	Margherita Panziera
Gold	9 August	Women's 400 m freestyle	Simona Quadarella

=== Diving ===
Medals

Medal	Date	Event	Athlete
Silver	7 August	Men's 1 m springboard	Giovanni Tocci
Silver	8 August	Women's 10 m platform	Noemi Batki
Bronze	10 August	Women's 1 m springboard	Elena Bertocchi
Gold	11 August	Women's 3 m synchro springboard	Elena Bertocchi; Chiara Pellacani

=== Open water swimming ===
Medals

Medal	Date	Event	Athlete
Bronze	8 August	Women's 5 km	Rachele Bruni
Silver	9 August	Women's 10 km	Giulia Gabbrielleschi
Bronze	12 August	Men's 25 km	Matteo Furlan
Gold	12 August	Women's 25 km	Arianna Bridi

=== Synchronised swimming ===
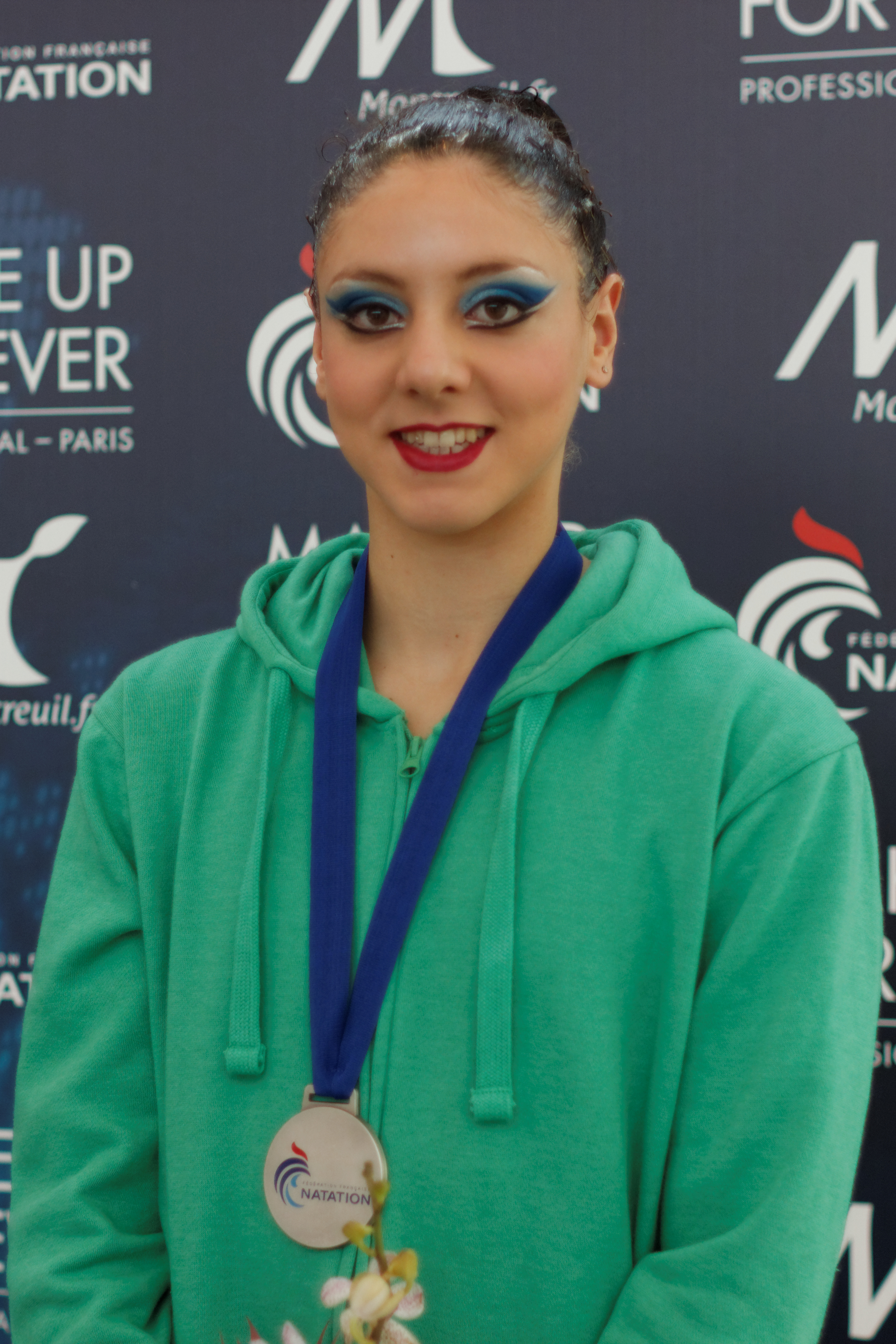
Linda Cerruti seven medals (3 silver and 4 bronzxe) at these Championships.

Italy finished the European championship with 9 medals in 9 events (4 silver and 5 bronze) at the 3rd place in the medal table.

Medals

Medal	Date	Event	Athlete
Bronze	3 August	Duet technical routine	Linda Cerruti; Costanza Ferro
Silver	3 August	Women's 400 m medley	Manila Flamini; Giorgio Minisini
Bronze	4 August	Team free routine	Beatrice Callegari; Linda Cerruti; Francesca Deidda; Costanza Di Camillo; Costanza Ferro; Gemma Galli; Alessia Pezone; Erica Piccoli
Silver	5 August	Combination routine	Beatrice Callegari; Domiziana Cavanna; Linda Cerruti; Francesca Deidda; Costanza Di Camillo; Costanza Ferro; Gemma Galli; Alessia Pezone; Enrica Piccoli; Federica Sala; Marta Murru; Francesca Zunino
Bronze	6 August	Solo technical routine	Linda Cerruti
Bronze	6 August	Team technical routine	Beatrice Callegari; Domiziana Cavanna; Linda Cerruti; Francesca Deidda; Costanza Di Camillo; Costanza Ferro; Gemma Galli; Enrica Piccoli; Alessia Pezone; Federica Sala
Bronze	7 August	Duetfree routine	Linda Cerruti; Costanza Ferro
Silver	7 August	Mixed free routine	Manila Flamini; Giorgio Minisini
Silver	7 August	Solo free routine	Linda Cerruti

== Cycling ==
=== Track ===
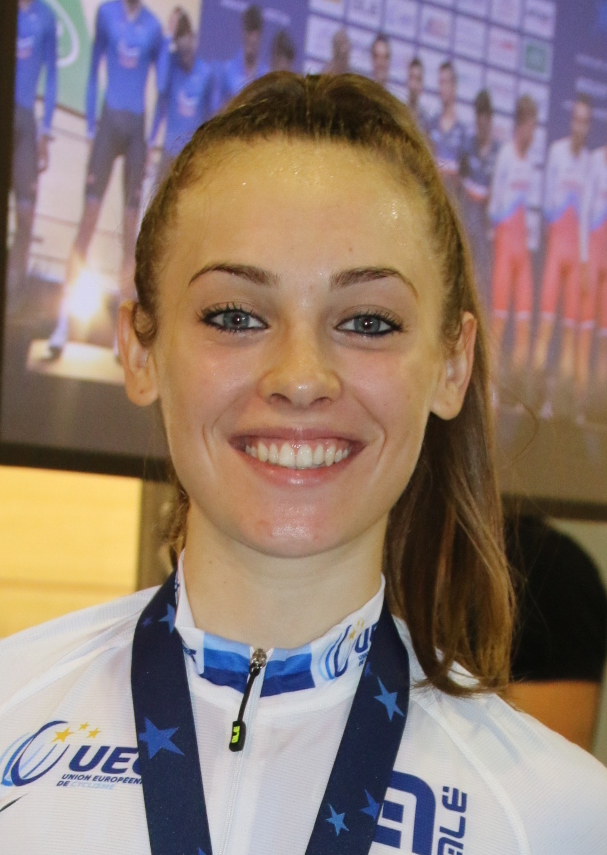
Letizia Paternoster (19 years) two medals at these Championships.

Italy finished the European championship with 5 medals (2 gold) at the 5th place in the medal table.

Medals

Medal	Date	Event	Athlete
Gold	3 August	Men's team pursuit	Filippo Ganna; Francesco Lamon; Elia Viviani; Michele Scartezzini; Liam Bertazzo
Silver	3 August	Women's team pursuit	Letizia Paternoster; Marta Cavalli; Elisa Balsamo; Silvia Valsecchi
Gold	4 August	Women's points race	Maria Giulia Confalonieri
Silver	4 August	Men's omnium	Elia Viviani
Bronze	6 August	Women's omnium	Letizia Paternoster

=== Road ===
Medals

Medal	Date	Event	Athlete
Gold	5 August	Women's road race	Marta Bastianelli
Gold	12 August	Men's road race	Matteo Trentin

=== Mountain bike ===
Medals

Medal	Date	Event	Athlete
Silver	7 August	Men's cross-country	Luca Braidot

== Golf ==
Italy participates with six competitors (four men and two women) on three teams: Lorenzo Gagli and Guido Migliozzi (Italy 1 – men's team), Francesco Laporta and Alessandro Tadini (Italy 2 – men's team), Diana Luna and Stefania Avanzo (with Gagli and Migliozzi – mixed team).

Medals

Medal	Date	Event	Athlete
Bronze	12 August	Men's team	Francesco Laporta; Alessandro Tadini

== Gymnastics ==
Men's finalists

Results	Date	Event	Athlete
8th	11 August	Team competition	Marco Sarrugerio; Tommaso De Vecchis; Marco Lodadio; Andrea Russo; Ludovico Edalli

Women's finalists

Results	Date	Event	Athlete
6th	4 August	Team competition	Martina Basile; Sofia Busato; Caterina Careghetti; Giada Grisetti; Francesca Noemi Linari
5th	5 August	Floor	Martina Basile

== Rowing ==
Italy finished the European championship with 6 medals (2 gold) at the 3rd place in the medal table.

Medals

Medal	Date	Event	Athlete
Gold	4 August	Men's lightweight quadruple sculls	Catello Amarante II; Paolo Di Girolamo; Andrea Micheletti; Matteo Mulas
Bronze	4 August	Women's pair	Alessandra Patelli; Sara Bertolasi
Gold	4 August	Men's quadruple scull	Filippo Mondelli; Andrea Panizza; Luca Rambaldi; Giacomo Gentile
Bronze	5 August	Women's lightweight single sculls	Clara Guerra
Silver	5 August	Men's lightweight single sculls	Martino Goretti
Bronze	5 August	Men's lightweight double sculls	Stefano Oppo; Pietro Ruta

== Triathlon ==
Best results

Medal	Date	Event	Athlete
12th	9 August	Women's race	Ilaria Zane
20th	10 August	Men's race	Davide Uccellari
9th	11 August	Mixed team relay	Ilaria Zane; Gialuca Pozzatti; Giorgia Priarone; Gregory Barnaby

== See also ==
- Italy national athletics team
- Italy national swimming team
