= Open water swimming at the 2019 World Aquatics Championships – Men's 25 km =

Men's 25 km at the 2019 World Aquatics Championships
- Venue: Yeosu Expo Ocean Park
- Location: Gwangju, South Korea
- Dates: 19 July
- Competitors: 24 from 15 nations
- Winning time: 4:51:06.2

Medalists
gold medal	Axel Reymond	France
silver medal	Kirill Belyaev	Russia
bronze medal	Alessio Occhipinti	Italy

The men's 25 km competition at the 2019 World Aquatics Championships was held on 19 July 2019.

== Race ==
The race was started at 08:00.

Results
Rank	Swimmer	Nationality	Time
1st place, gold medalist(s)	Axel Reymond	France	4:51:06.2
2nd place, silver medalist(s)	Kirill Belyaev	Russia	4:51:06.5
3rd place, bronze medalist(s)	Alessio Occhipinti	Italy	4:51:09.5
4	Simone Ruffini	Italy	4:51:14.9
5	Kai Edwards	Australia	4:51:17.2
6	Evgeny Drattsev	Russia	4:51:19.6
7	Alberto Martínez	Spain	4:51:44.1
8	Andreas Waschburger	Germany	4:52:26.3
9	Sören Meißner	Germany	4:52:52.9
10	Gergely Gyurta	Hungary	4:52:57.5
11	Matěj Kozubek	Czech Republic	4:54:27.5
12	Yuval Safra	Israel	4:54:38.7
13	Evgenij Pop Acev	North Macedonia	4:54:39.9
14	David Heron	United States	4:55:11.8
15	Brennan Gravley	United States	4:57:17.5
16	Vitaliy Khudyakov	Kazakhstan	4:58:33.0
17	Daniel Delgadillo	Mexico	5:02:41.6
18	Bailey Armstrong	Australia	5:04:10.7
19	Lu Mingyu	China	5:15:20.6
20	Wang Ruoyu	China	5:15:29.3
21	Lev Cherepanov	Kazakhstan	5:22:47.4
22	Maximiliano Paccot	Uruguay	5:41:44.7
	Marc-Antoine Olivier	France	DNF
	Kristóf Rasovszky	Hungary	DNF
