= Swimming at the 2014 European Aquatics Championships – Women's 200 metre breaststroke =

Women's 200 metre breaststroke at the Swimming at the 2014 European Aquatics Championships
- Dates: 21–22 August
- Competitors: 33 from 25 nations
- Winning time: 2:19.84

Medalists
gold medal	Rikke Møller Pedersen	Denmark
silver medal	Molly Renshaw	Great Britain
bronze medal	Jessica Vall	Spain

The Women's 200 metre breaststroke competition of the 2014 European Aquatics Championships was held on 21–22 August.

== Records ==
Prior to the competition, the existing world, European and championship records were as follows.

	Name	Nation	Time	Location	Date
World record	Rikke Møller Pedersen	Denmark	2:19.11	Barcelona	28 July 2013
European record	Rikke Møller Pedersen	Denmark	2:19.11	Barcelona	28 July 2013
Championship record	Anastasia Chaun	Russia	2:23.50	Budapest	13 August 2010

== Results ==
=== Heats ===
The heats were held at 09:30.

Rank	Heat	Lane	Name	Nationality	Time	Notes
1	2	5	Vitalina Simonova	Russia	2:25.46	Q
2	3	4	Marina García Urzainqui	Spain	2:25.69	Q
3	2	4	Jessica Vall	Spain	2:26.80	Q
4	3	3	Giulia De Ascentis	Italy	2:26.88	Q
5	2	6	Fanny Lecluyse	Belgium	2:27.38	Q
6	4	4	Rikke Møller Pedersen	Denmark	2:27.42	Q
7	3	5	Molly Renshaw	Great Britain	2:27.49	Q
8	2	3	Vanessa Grimberg	Germany	2:27.56	Q
9	4	6	Maria Astashkina	Russia	2:27.95	Q
10	3	2	Hrafnhildur Lúthersdóttir	Iceland	2:28.07	Q
11	2	2	Martina Moravčíková	Czech Republic	2:28.37	Q
12	4	3	Elisa Celli	Italy	2:28.59	Q
13	4	1	Coralie Dobral	France	2:29.12	Q
14	3	0	Tanja Šmid	Slovenia	2:30.29	Q
15	4	2	Jenna Laukkanen	Finland	2:30.74	Q
16	4	8	Olga Tovstogan	Ukraine	2:30.77	Q
17	3	8	Jessica Eriksson	Sweden	2:31.11	
18	1	5	Alona Ribakova	Latvia	2:31.52	
19	2	7	Petra Chocová	Czech Republic	2:31.62	
20	1	4	Victoria Kaminskaya	Portugal	2:31.67	
21	2	1	Sycerika McMahon	Ireland	2:31.81	
22	4	9	Anastasia Korotkov	Israel	2:32.05	
23	3	7	Fiona Doyle	Ireland	2:32.23	
24	2	0	Tjaša Vozel	Slovenia	2:32.59	
25	3	1	Stina Colleou	Norway	2:33.03	
26	2	8	Ana Radič	Croatia	2:33.40	
27	2	9	Vilma Ekström	Sweden	2:34.67	
28	3	9	Fantine Lesaffre	France	2:34.79	
29	1	3	Maria Romanjuk	Estonia	2:34.89	
30	4	7	Lisa Zaiser	Austria	2:35.78	
31	4	0	Jovana Bogdanović	Serbia	2:37.79	
32	1	6	Andrea Podmaníková	Slovakia	2:39.89	
33	1	2	Alina Bulmag	Moldova	2:41.04	
—	3	6	Joline Höstman	Sweden		DNS
—	4	5	Sophie Taylor	Great Britain		DNS

=== Semifinals ===
The semifinals were held at 19:14.

==== Semifinal 1 ====
Rank	Lane	Name	Nationality	Time	Notes
1	3	Rikke Møller Pedersen	Denmark	2:22.32	Q, CR
2	4	Marina García Urzainqui	Spain	2:24.87	Q
3	5	Giulia De Ascentis	Italy	2:26.34	Q
4	7	Elisa Celli	Italy	2:26.87	
5	6	Vanessa Grimberg	Germany	2:27.01	
6	2	Hrafnhildur Lúthersdóttir	Iceland	2:28.72	
7	8	Olga Tovstogan	Ukraine	2:30.55	
8	1	Tanja Šmid	Slovenia	2:31.15	

==== Semifinal 2 ====
Rank	Lane	Name	Nationality	Time	Notes
1	4	Vitalina Simonova	Russia	2:23.35	Q
2	5	Jessica Vall	Spain	2:24.78	Q
3	6	Molly Renshaw	Great Britain	2:25.55	Q
4	2	Maria Astashkina	Russia	2:26.14	Q
5	3	Fanny Lecluyse	Belgium	2:26.26	Q
6	7	Martina Moravčíková	Czech Republic	2:27.75	
7	1	Coralie Dobral	France	2:29.11	
8	8	Jenna Laukkanen	Finland	2:31.29	

=== Final ===
The final was held at 18:43.

Rank	Lane	Name	Nationality	Time	Notes
1st place, gold medalist(s)	4	Rikke Møller Pedersen	Denmark	2:19.84	CR
2nd place, silver medalist(s)	2	Molly Renshaw	Great Britain	2:23.82	
3rd place, bronze medalist(s)	3	Jessica Vall	Spain	2:24.08	
4	5	Vitalina Simonova	Russia	2:24.87	
5	6	Marina García Urzainqui	Spain	2:24.96	
6	7	Maria Astashkina	Russia	2:25.07	
7	8	Giulia De Ascentis	Italy	2:26.71	
8	1	Fanny Lecluyse	Belgium	2:28.38	
