= Open water swimming at the 2018 European Aquatics Championships – Men's 10 km =

Men's 10 km at the 2018 European Aquatics Championships
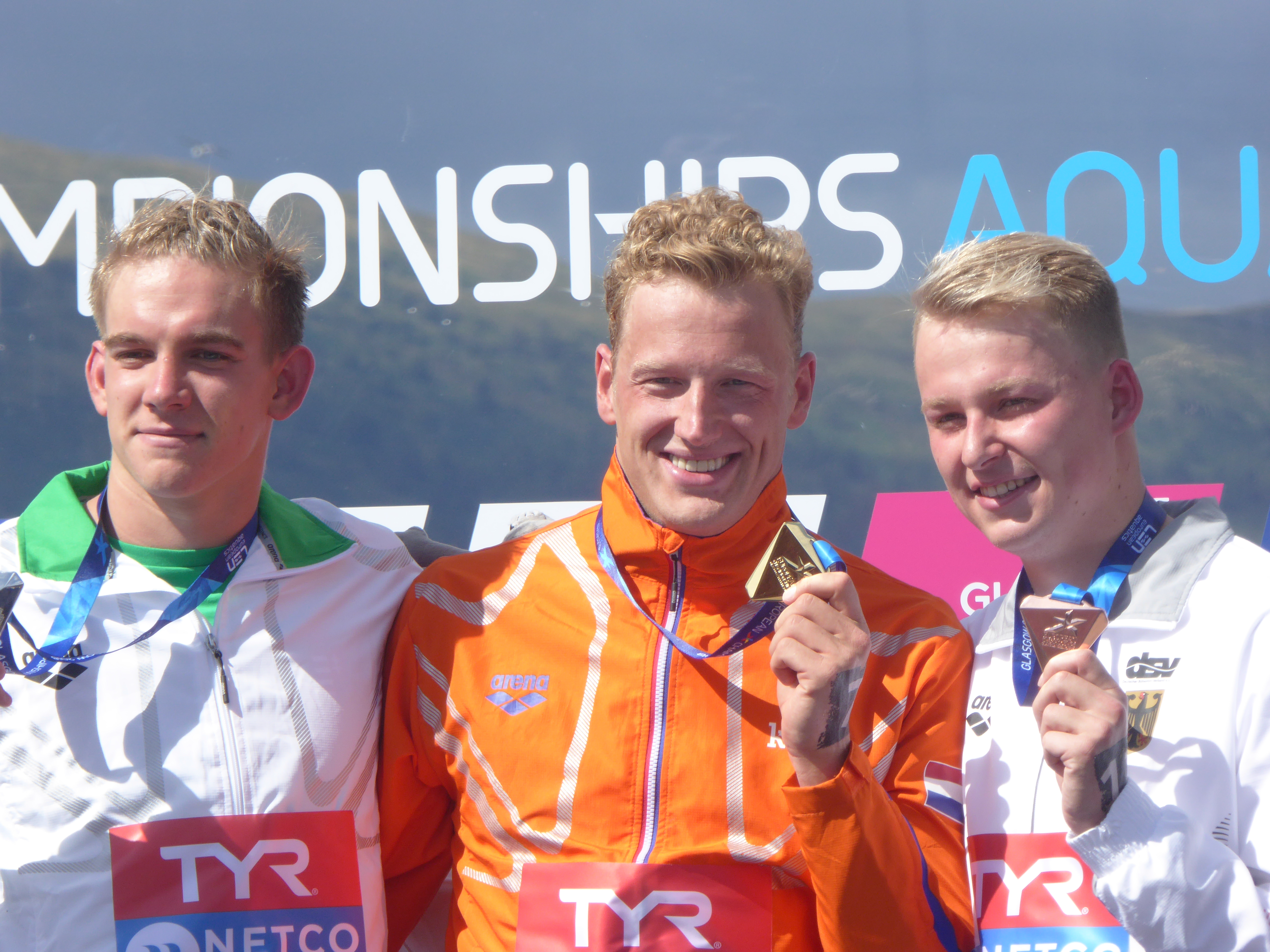
- The medallists (from left to right): Kristóf Rasovszky (silver), Ferry Weertman (gold) and Rob Muffels (bronze)
- Venue: Loch Lomond
- Dates: 9 August
- Competitors: 37 from 18 nations
- Winning time: 1:49:28.2

Medalists
gold medal	Ferry Weertman	Netherlands
silver medal	Kristóf Rasovszky	Hungary
bronze medal	Rob Muffels	Germany

The Men's 10 km competition of the 2018 European Aquatics Championships was held on 9 August 2018.

== Results ==
The race was started at 12:30.

Rank	Swimmer	Nationality	Time
1st place, gold medalist(s)	Ferry Weertman	Netherlands	1:49:28.2
2nd place, silver medalist(s)	Kristóf Rasovszky	Hungary	1:49:28.2
3rd place, bronze medalist(s)	Rob Muffels	Germany	1:49:33.7
4	Marc-Antoine Olivier	France	1:49:34.7
5	Matan Roditi	Israel	1:49:36.2
6	Matteo Furlan	Italy	1:49:36.7
7	Jack Burnell	Great Britain	1:49:37.1
8	Mario Sanzullo	Italy	1:49:47.4
9	Tobias Robinson	Great Britain	1:49:47.5
10	Alberto Martínez	Spain	1:49:49.7
11	Kirill Belyaev	Russia	1:49:51.6
12	David Aubry	France	1:49:52.0
13	Pepijn Smits	Netherlands	1:49:52.3
14	Dániel Székelyi	Hungary	1:49:53.3
15	Simone Ruffini	Italy	1:49:53.5
16	Sören Meißner	Germany	1:49:56.0
17	Raúl Santiago Betancor	Spain	1:49:56.1
18	Ventsislav Aydarski	Bulgaria	1:50:40.5
19	Logan Vanhuys	Belgium	1:50:43.9
20	Andreas Waschburger	Germany	1:50:51.5
21	Vít Ingeduld	Czech Republic	1:50:51.7
22	Ihor Chervynskyy	Ukraine	1:50:58.4
23	David Brandl	Austria	1:50:59.6
24	Evgeny Drattsev	Russia	1:51:00.5
25	Yuval Safra	Israel	1:51:00.6
26	Kirill Abromisov	Russia	1:51:20.5
27	Rafael Gil	Portugal	1:51:21.3
28	Pol Gil Tarazona	Spain	1:51:49.3
29	Caleb Hughes	Great Britain	1:51:49.3
30	Logan Fontaine	France	1:52:09.9
31	Shahar Resman	Israel	1:52:12.0
32	Matěj Kozubek	Czech Republic	1:52:34.5
33	Krzysztof Pielowski	Poland	1:53:00.2
34	Tiago Campos	Portugal	1:54:04.9
35	Tamás Farkas	Serbia	1:54:25.4
—	Dávid Huszti	Hungary	Did not finish
—	Ivan Fratrič	Slovakia	Did not finish
—	Dimitrios Negris	Greece	Did not start
