= Swimming at the 2018 European Aquatics Championships – Women's 200 metre breaststroke =

Women's 200 metre breaststroke at the 2018 European Aquatics Championships
- Venue: Tollcross International Swimming Centre
- Dates: 6 August (heats and semifinals); 7 August (final)
- Competitors: 34 from 23 nations
- Winning time: 2:21.31

Medalists
gold medal	Yuliya Yefimova	Russia
silver medal	Jessica Vall	Spain
bronze medal	Molly Renshaw	Great Britain

The Women's 200 metre breaststroke competition of the 2018 European Aquatics Championships was held on 6 and 7 August 2018.

== Records ==
Prior to the competition, the existing world and championship records were as follows.

	Name	Nation	Time	Location	Date
World record European record	Rikke Møller Pedersen	Denmark	2:19.11	Barcelona	1 August 2013
Championship record	Rikke Møller Pedersen	Denmark	2:19.84	Berlin	22 August 2014

== Results ==
=== Heats ===
The heats were started on 6 August at 09:53.

Rank	Heat	Lane	Name	Nationality	Time	Notes
1	4	3	Rikke Møller Pedersen	Denmark	2:25.73	Q
2	3	7	Thea Blomsterberg	Denmark	2:25.98	Q
3	4	5	Marina García Urzainqui	Spain	2:26.01	Q
4	2	5	Vitalina Simonova	Russia	2:26.82	Q
5	3	4	Molly Renshaw	Great Britain	2:26.88	Q
6	2	4	Jessica Vall	Spain	2:26.94	Q
7	4	8	Victoria Kaminskaya	Portugal	2:27.34	Q
8	3	5	Chloé Tutton	Great Britain	2:27.37	Q
9	4	4	Yuliya Yefimova	Russia	2:27.66	Q
10	3	3	Jessica Steiger	Germany	2:27.71	Q
11	3	6	Francesca Fangio	Italy	2:27.77	Q
12	2	8	Anna Wermuth	Denmark	2:27.78	
13	2	7	Lisa Mamie	Switzerland	2:27.80	Q
14	2	3	Fanny Lecluyse	Belgium	2:28.77	Q
15	3	2	Fanny Deberghes	France	2:29.07	Q
16	4	6	Viktoriya Zeynep Güneş	Turkey	2:29.33	Q
17	2	2	Anna Pirovano	Italy	2:29.46	Q
18	3	1	Stina Colleou	Norway	2:29.58	
19	4	9	Weronika Hallmann	Poland	2:29.59	
20	2	1	Raquel Pereira	Portugal	2:30.05	
21	4	1	Sophie Hansson	Sweden	2:31.05	
22	4	2	Kotryna Teterevkova	Lithuania	2:31.31	
23	1	3	Maria Romanjuk	Estonia	2:31.64	
24	3	8	Anastasia Gorbenko	Israel	2:31.70	
25	3	9	Sara Staudinger	Switzerland	2:32.04	
26	1	2	Alina Zmushka	Belarus	2:32.13	
27	4	7	Jenna Laukkanen	Finland	2:32.28	
28	2	0	Jessica Eriksson	Sweden	2:32.41	
29	4	0	Tjaša Vozel	Slovenia	2:33.10	
30	3	0	Andrea Podmaníková	Slovakia	2:34.01	
31	1	6	Nikoleta Trníková	Slovakia	2:36.01	
32	1	5	Elena Guttiman	Austria	2:36.96	
33	2	9	Alexandra Schegoleva	Cyprus	2:38.65	
34	1	4	Lea Polonsky	Israel	2:39.45	
	2	6	Fantine Lesaffre	France	Did not start	

=== Semifinals ===
The semifinals were started on 6 August at 17:30.

==== Semifinal 1 ====
Rank	Lane	Name	Nationality	Time	Notes
1	3	Jessica Vall	Spain	2:25.94	Q
2	6	Chloé Tutton	Great Britain	2:26.62	Q
3	2	Jessica Steiger	Germany	2:26.84	Q
4	5	Vitalina Simonova	Russia	2:26.89	
5	4	Thea Blomsterberg	Denmark	2:27.29	
6	1	Fanny Deberghes	France	2:28.16	
7	8	Anna Pirovano	Italy	2:29.21	
8	7	Lisa Mamie	Switzerland	2:29.25	

==== Semifinal 2 ====
Rank	Lane	Name	Nationality	Time	Notes
1	2	Yuliya Yefimova	Russia	2:23.49	Q
2	3	Molly Renshaw	Great Britain	2:24.39	Q
3	4	Rikke Møller Pedersen	Denmark	2:24.56	Q
4	5	Marina García Urzainqui	Spain	2:24.67	Q
5	1	Fanny Lecluyse	Belgium	2:25.76	Q
6	8	Viktoriya Zeynep Güneş	Turkey	2:27.14	
7	6	Victoria Kaminskaya	Portugal	2:27.19	
8	7	Francesca Fangio	Italy	2:28.52	

=== Final ===
The final was started on 7 August at 17:25.

Rank	Lane	Name	Nationality	Time	Notes
1st place, gold medalist(s)	4	Yuliya Yefimova	Russia	2:21.31	
2nd place, silver medalist(s)	7	Jessica Vall	Spain	2:23.02	
3rd place, bronze medalist(s)	3	Molly Renshaw	Great Britain	2:23.43	
4	5	Marina García Urzainqui	Spain	2:23.63	
5	6	Rikke Møller Pedersen	Denmark	2:24.73	
6	2	Fanny Lecluyse	Belgium	2:26.01	
7	8	Jessica Steiger	Germany	2:27.66	
—	1	Chloé Tutton	Great Britain	Disqualified	
