= 2018 FINA World Swimming Championships (25 m) – Women's 400 metre individual medley =

Women's 400 metre individual medley at the 2018 FINA World Swimming Championships (25 m)
- Venue: Hangzhou Sports Park Stadium
- Dates: 11 December (heats and final)
- Competitors: 30 from 23 nations
- Winning time: 4:21.40

Medalists
gold medal	Katinka Hosszú	Hungary
silver medal	Melanie Margalis	United States
bronze medal	Fantine Lesaffre	France

The women's 400 metre individual medley competition of the 2018 FINA World Swimming Championships (25 m) was held on 11 December 2018.

== Records ==
Prior to the competition, the existing world and championship records were as follows.

	Name	Nation	Time	Location	Date
World record	Mireia Belmonte	Spain	4:18.94	Netanya	12 August 2017
Championship record	Mireia Belmonte	Spain	4:19.86	Doha	3 December 2014

== Results ==
=== Heats ===
The heats were started at 11:05.

Rank	Heat	Lane	Name	Nationality	Time	Notes
1	3	4	Katinka Hosszú	Hungary	4:23.59	Q
2	2	3	Fantine Lesaffre	France	4:27.74	Q
3	2	6	Lara Grangeon	France	4:27.91	Q
4	2	5	Ilaria Cusinato	Italy	4:28.02	Q
5	3	1	Melanie Margalis	United States	4:29.14	Q
6	2	4	Catalina Corro	Spain	4:31.02	Q
7	3	6	Sakiko Shimizu	Japan	4:31.12	Q
8	3	5	Miho Takahashi	Japan	4:31.13	Q
9	3	2	Abbey Harkin	Australia	4:33.23	
10	2	2	Leah Smith	United States	4:34.93	
11	3	3	Zhou Min	China	4:35.34	
12	1	3	Florencia Perotti	Argentina	4:36.68	
13	2	0	Nguyễn Thị Ánh Viên	Vietnam	4:37.28	
14	3	7	Barbora Závadová	Czech Republic	4:37.33	
15	3	8	Jimena Pérez	Spain	4:37.42	
16	2	7	Irina Krivonogova	Russia	4:37.54	
17	2	1	Victoria Kaminskaya	Portugal	4:38.49	
18	3	0	Rebecca Meder	South Africa	4:39.31	
19	1	6	Claudia Hufnagl	Austria	4:39.76	
20	2	9	Diana Durães	Portugal	4:39.81	
21	3	9	Katja Fain	Slovenia	4:40.00	
22	1	5	Viktoriya Zeynep Güneş	Turkey	4:40.67	
23	2	8	Anastasiia Sorokina	Russia	4:41.43	
24	1	2	Ruby Matthews	New Zealand	4:43.91	
25	1	7	Lam Hoi Kiu	Hong Kong	4:47.47	
26	1	4	Tereza Horáková	Czech Republic	4:48.83	
27	1	8	Hamida Rania Nefsi	Algeria	4:53.29	
28	1	1	Wang Wan-chen	Chinese Taipei	4:54.25	
29	1	0	Sára Niepelová	Slovakia	4:54.87	
30	1	9	Daniela Alfaro	Costa Rica	5:01.36	NR

=== Final ===
The final was held at 19:48.

Rank	Lane	Name	Nationality	Time	Notes
1st place, gold medalist(s)	4	Katinka Hosszú	Hungary	4:21.40	
2nd place, silver medalist(s)	2	Melanie Margalis	United States	4:25.84	
3rd place, bronze medalist(s)	5	Fantine Lesaffre	France	4:27.31	=NR
4	6	Ilaria Cusinato	Italy	4:27.88	
5	3	Lara Grangeon	France	4:29.56	
6	1	Sakiko Shimizu	Japan	4:31.07	
7	7	Catalina Corro	Spain	4:31.63	
8	8	Miho Takahashi	Japan	4:35.62	
