= Molly Renshaw =

English swimmer (born 1996)

Personal information
- National team: Great Britain; England
- Born: 6 May 1996 (age 30) Mansfield, England
- Height: 1.75 m (5 ft 9 in)
- Weight: 65 kg (143 lb)

Sport
- Sport: Swimming
- Strokes: Breaststroke
Medal record
Women's swimming
Representing Great Britain
World Championships (SC)
| Gold medal – first place | 2016 Windsor | 200 m breaststroke |
| Bronze medal – third place | 2021 Abu Dhabi | 200 m breaststroke |
European Championships (LC)
| Gold medal – first place | 2016 London | 4×100 m medley |
| Gold medal – first place | 2020 Budapest | 200 m breaststroke |
| Gold medal – first place | 2020 Budapest | 4×100 m medley |
| Silver medal – second place | 2014 Berlin | 200 m breaststroke |
| Bronze medal – third place | 2018 Glasgow | 200 m breaststroke |
European Championships (SC)
| Silver medal – second place | 2019 Glasgow | 200 m breaststroke |
European Junior Championships
| Gold medal – first place | 2012 Antwerp | 200 m breaststroke |
| Bronze medal – third place | 2011 Belgrade | 200 m breaststroke |
Representing England
Commonwealth Games
| Silver medal – second place | 2014 Glasgow | 4×100 m medley |
| Silver medal – second place | 2018 Gold Coast | 200 m breaststroke |
| Bronze medal – third place | 2014 Glasgow | 200 m breaststroke |
| Bronze medal – third place | 2022 Birmingham | 4×100 m medley |

Molly Renshaw (born 6 May 1996) is an English breaststroke swimmer. In 2016, she won the 200 metres breaststroke at the 2016 FINA World Swimming Championships (25m).

== Career ==
In 2012, she won the national 200 m title, but was not selected for the 2012 Olympics because her time was below the qualifying standard. She swam the qualifying time at the Olympic trials of March 2012, but did not win the race, which was required for the Olympic selection.

Renshaw made her British debut aged 15 at the 2011 World Championships in Shanghai, the first of five World Championships in which she reached five individual finals and one with the British women’s medley relay.

She competed at the 2016 Summer Olympics, setting a new British record of 2:22:33 while qualifying for the 200m breaststroke final.

In 2020 Renshaw competed for the US-based swim team - New York Breakers - in the second season of the International Swimming League.

Renshaw was named as a member of the British team to go to the postponed 2020 Olympics in 2021.

Renshaw was selected to compete for the New York Breakers again for the 2021 International Swimming League.

On 8 November 2022, Renshaw announced her retirement from the sport after an 11-year career.
