= Logan Fontaine =

French open water swimmer (born 1999)

Personal information
- Full name: Logan Christophe Albert Michel Fontaine
- Born: 25 March 1999 (age 27) Argentan, France
- Height: 178 cm (5 ft 10 in)
- Weight: 66 kg (146 lb)

Sport
- Country: France
- Sport: Open water swimming
- Event: 5 km
Medal record
Men's swimming
Representing France
World Championships
Gold medal – first place	2017 Budapest	Team
Gold medal – first place	2024 Doha	5 km open water
Silver medal – second place	2019 Gwangju	5 km open water
World Championships (SC)
Bronze medal – third place	2022 Melbourne	800 m freestyle
European Championships
Silver medal – second place	2025 Stari Grad	3 km open water
Silver medal – second place	2025 Stari Grad	10 km open water
Bronze medal – third place	2018 Glasgow	5 km open water
Bronze medal – third place	2022 Rome	10 km open water
Bronze medal – third place	2022 Rome	Team relay
Bronze medal – third place	2025 Stari Grad	Team Relay
Bronze medal – third place	2026 Paris	3 km knockout sprint

Logan Christophe Albert Michel Fontaine (born 25 March 1999) is a French open water swimmer.

He competed in the 5 km open water event at the 2018 European Aquatics Championships, winning the bronze medal.
