= Kirill Belyaev =

Russian swimmer (born 1997)

Personal information
- Full name: Kirill Nikolayevich Belyaev
- Nationality: Russian
- Born: 27 August 1997 (age 28)

Sport
- Sport: Swimming
- Strokes: Open water swimming
Medal record
World Championships
Silver medal – second place	2019 Gwangju	25 km open water
European Championships
Silver medal – second place	2018 Glasgow	25 km open water

Kirill Nikolayevich Belyaev (Russian: Кирилл Николаевич Беляев; born 27 August 1997) is a Russian swimmer.

He competed in the 25 km open water event at the 2018 European Aquatics Championships, winning the silver medal. He also won silver at the 2019 World Aquatics Championships in the same competition.
