= Alessio Occhipinti =

Italian swimmer (born 1996)

Personal information
- Nationality: Italian
- Born: 26 March 1996 (age 30)

Sport
- Country: Italy
- Sport: Open water swimming
- Event: 25 km
Medal record
World Championships
Bronze medal – third place	2019 Gwangju	25 km open water

Alessio Occhipinti (born 26 March 1996) is an Italian open water swimmer.

He participated at the 2019 World Aquatics Championships, winning a medal.

He swam at the FINA UltraMarathon Swim Series 2021 winning a gold medal.

He also participated at the 2025 Santa Fe-Coronda Marathon and in the edition of 2026, winning in both a gold medal.
