= Swimming at the 2018 European Aquatics Championships – Women's 200 metre individual medley =

Women's 200 metre individual medley at the 2018 European Aquatics Championships
- Venue: Tollcross International Swimming Centre
- Dates: 7 August (heats and semifinals); 8 August (final)
- Competitors: 32 from 17 nations
- Winning time: 2:10.17

Medalists
gold medal	Katinka Hosszú	Hungary
silver medal	Ilaria Cusinato	Italy
bronze medal	Maria Ugolkova	Switzerland

The Women's 200 metre individual medley competition of the 2018 European Aquatics Championships was held on 7 and 8 August 2018.

== Records ==
Prior to the competition, the existing world and championship records were as follows.

	Name	Nation	Time	Location	Date
World record European record	Katinka Hosszú	Hungary	2:06.12	Kazan	3 August 2015
Championship record	Katinka Hosszú	Hungary	2:07.30	London	19 May 2016

== Results ==
=== Heats ===
The heats were started on 7 August at 09:25.

Rank	Heat	Lane	Name	Nationality	Time	Notes
1	4	4	Katinka Hosszú	Hungary	2:11.09	Q
2	3	4	Siobhan-Marie O'Connor	Great Britain	2:11.39	Q
3	3	5	Maria Ugolkova	Switzerland	2:12.43	Q
4	2	3	Aimee Willmott	Great Britain	2:12.64	Q
5	2	4	Ilaria Cusinato	Italy	2:12.98	Q
6	4	3	Zsuzsanna Jakabos	Hungary	2:13.37	Q
7	3	6	Fantine Lesaffre	France	2:13.44	Q
8	4	5	Hannah Miley	Great Britain	2:13.60	
9	4	2	Abbie Wood	Great Britain	2:13.65	
10	4	1	Anja Crevar	Serbia	2:14.29	Q
11	4	6	Viktoriya Andreyeva	Russia	2:14.91	Q
12	4	7	Evelyn Verrasztó	Hungary	2:15.04	
13	3	1	Barbora Závadová	Czech Republic	2:15.17	Q
14	2	5	Yuliya Yefimova	Russia	2:15.35	Q, WD
15	3	2	Cyrielle Duhamel	France	2:15.41	Q
16	2	7	Anastasia Gorbenko	Israel	2:15.49	Q
17	2	2	Dalma Sebestyén	Hungary	2:15.53	
18	2	6	Viktoriya Zeynep Güneş	Turkey	2:15.72	Q
19	4	8	Carlotta Toni	Italy	2:15.91	Q
20	3	3	Sara Franceschi	Italy	2:16.16	
21	4	0	Kristýna Horská	Czech Republic	2:16.50	Q
22	3	0	Nikoletta Pavlopoulou	Greece	2:17.27	Q
23	3	7	Anna Pirovano	Italy	2:18.12	
24	2	0	Paula Żukowska	Poland	2:18.16	
25	2	1	Victoria Kaminskaya	Portugal	2:18.88	
26	1	4	Lisa Mamie	Switzerland	2:19.67	
27	2	9	Vilma Ruotsalainen	Finland	2:19.94	
28	3	9	Shahar Menahem	Israel	2:19.98	
29	1	3	Margaret Markvardt	Estonia	2:21.10	
30	4	9	Niamh Kilgallen	Ireland	2:21.97	
31	2	8	Lea Polonsky	Israel	2:22.47	
32	1	6	Nikoleta Trníková	Slovakia	2:23.17	
	1	5	Cornelia Pammer	Austria	Did not start	
	3	8	Jenna Laukkanen	Finland	Did not start	

=== Semifinals ===
The semifinals were started on 7 August at 17:39.

==== Semifinal 1 ====
Rank	Lane	Name	Nationality	Time	Notes
1	4	Siobhan-Marie O'Connor	Great Britain	2:09.80	Q
2	3	Zsuzsanna Jakabos	Hungary	2:12.96	Q
3	5	Aimee Willmott	Great Britain	2:13.09	Q
4	6	Anja Crevar	Serbia	2:14.05	
5	2	Barbora Závadová	Czech Republic	2:14.25	
6	1	Carlotta Toni	Italy	2:14.87	
7	7	Anastasia Gorbenko	Israel	2:16.84	
8	8	Nikoletta Pavlopoulou	Greece	2:16.85	

==== Semifinal 2 ====
Rank	Lane	Name	Nationality	Time	Notes
1	4	Katinka Hosszú	Hungary	2:10.49	Q
2	3	Ilaria Cusinato	Italy	2:10.77	Q
3	5	Maria Ugolkova	Switzerland	2:11.41	Q
4	1	Viktoriya Zeynep Güneş	Turkey	2:12.73	Q
5	6	Fantine Lesaffre	France	2:13.13	Q
6	2	Viktoriya Andreyeva	Russia	2:15.56	
7	8	Kristýna Horská	Czech Republic	2:15.69	
8	7	Cyrielle Duhamel	France	2:16.61	

=== Final ===
The final was started on 8 August at 17:39.

Rank	Lane	Name	Nationality	Time	Notes
1st place, gold medalist(s)	5	Katinka Hosszú	Hungary	2:10.17	
2nd place, silver medalist(s)	3	Ilaria Cusinato	Italy	2:10.25	
3rd place, bronze medalist(s)	6	Maria Ugolkova	Switzerland	2:10.83	
4	4	Siobhan-Marie O'Connor	Great Britain	2:10.85	
5	8	Fantine Lesaffre	France	2:11.71	
6	2	Viktoriya Zeynep Güneş	Turkey	2:12.17	
7	1	Aimee Willmott	Great Britain	2:13.13	
8	7	Zsuzsanna Jakabos	Hungary	2:13.37	
