= Open water swimming at the 2018 European Aquatics Championships – Men's 25 km =

Men's 25 km at the 2018 European Aquatics Championships
- Venue: Loch Lomond
- Dates: 12 August
- Competitors: 19 from 9 nations
- Winning time: 4:57:53.5

Medalists
gold medal	Kristóf Rasovszky	Hungary
silver medal	Kirill Belyaev	Russia
bronze medal	Matteo Furlan	Italy

The Men's 25 km competition of the 2018 European Aquatics Championships was held on 12 August 2018.

== Results ==
The race was started at 09:00.

Rank	Swimmer	Nationality	Time
1st place, gold medalist(s)	Kristóf Rasovszky	Hungary	4:57:53.5
2nd place, silver medalist(s)	Kirill Belyaev	Russia	4:57:54.6
3rd place, bronze medalist(s)	Matteo Furlan	Italy	4:57:55.8
4	Axel Reymond	France	4:58:03.4
5	Simone Ruffini	Italy	4:58:04.3
6	Evgeny Drattsev	Russia	4:59:42.1
7	Anton Evsikov	Russia	5:00:13.3
8	Pepijn Smits	Netherlands	5:00:15.5
9	Andreas Waschburger	Germany	5:00:30.1
10	Alexander Studzinski	Germany	5:01:09.4
11	Alberto Martínez	Spain	5:01:24.3
12	Yuval Safra	Israel	5:02:11.5
13	Matěj Kozubek	Czech Republic	5:03:34.5
14	Dániel Székelyi	Hungary	5:03:34.6
15	David Aubry	France	5:06:03.1
16	Alessio Occhipinti	Italy	5:06:04.2
17	Pol Gil Tarazona	Spain	5:06:14.8
—	Shai Toledano	Israel	Did not finish
—	Florian Wellbrock	Germany	Did not finish
—	Ferry Weertman	Netherlands	Did not start
—	Shahar Resman	Israel	Did not start
