= María Juárez =

Spanish synchronised swimmer

Personal information
- Full name: María Juárez Campos
- Nationality: Spanish
- Born: 11 February 1997 (age 29)

Sport
- Country: Spain
- Sport: Synchronised swimming
Medal record
World Championships
Bronze medal – third place	2019 Gwangju	Highlight routine
European Championships
Bronze medal – third place	2018 Glasgow	Free routine combination

María Juárez Campos (Note: In this Spanish name, the first or paternal surname is Juárez and the second or maternal family name is Campos.) (born 11 February 1997) is a Spanish synchronised swimmer.

She won a bronze medal in the free routine combination competition at the 2018 European Aquatics Championships.
