= Sören Meißner =

German swimmer

Personal information
- Nationality: German
- Born: 12 February 1990 (age 36)

Sport
- Sport: Swimming
- Strokes: Open water swimming
Medal record
World Championships
| Gold medal – first place | 2019 Gwangju | Team event |
European Championships
| Silver medal – second place | 2018 Glasgow | Team event |

Sören Meißner (born 12 February 1990) is a German swimmer.

He competed in the Team event at the 2018 European Aquatics Championships, winning the silver medal.

He achieved the greatest success of his career with the mixed relay team over 4 × 1.25 km in open water, where he supported the team with a strong performance. At the 2018 European Championships in Glasgow, the team finished as European runners-up. A year later, the mixed relay team (2 women and 2 men) won the World Championships in Gwangju (open water competitions in Yeosu).
