= Abril Conesa =

Spanish synchronised swimmer

Personal information
- Full name: Abril Conesa Prieto
- Nationality: Spanish
- Born: 25 February 2000 (age 26)

Sport
- Country: Spain
- Sport: Synchronised swimming
Medal record
World Championships
Bronze medal – third place	2019 Gwangju	Highlight routine
Bronze medal – third place	2022 Budapest	Highlight routine
European Championships
Bronze medal – third place	2018 Glasgow	Free routine combination

Abril Conesa Prieto (Note: In this Spanish name, the first or paternal surname is Conesa and the second or maternal family name is Prieto.) (born 25 February 2000) is a Spanish synchronised swimmer.

She won a bronze medal in the free routine combination competition at the 2018 European Aquatics Championships.
