= Open water swimming at the 2018 European Aquatics Championships – Team =

Team at the 2018 European Aquatics Championships
- Venue: Loch Lomond
- Dates: 11 August
- Competitors: 36 from 9 nations
- Teams: 9
- Winning time: 52:35.0

Medalists
gold medal	Esmee Vermeulen; Sharon van Rouwendaal; Pepijn Smits; Ferry Weertman	Netherlands
silver medal	Leonie Beck; Sarah Köhler; Sören Meißner; Florian Wellbrock	Germany
bronze medal	Lara Grangeon; David Aubry; Lisa Pou; Marc-Antoine Olivier	France

The Team competition of the 2018 European Aquatics Championships was held on 11 August 2018.

== Results ==
The race was started at 11:00.

Rank	Nation	Time
1st place, gold medalist(s)	Netherlands	52:35.0
2nd place, silver medalist(s)	Germany	52:35.6
3rd place, bronze medalist(s)	France	52:46.7
4	Great Britain	52:51.3
5	Italy; Martina De Memme; Matteo Furlan; Giulia Gabrielleschi; Mauro Sanzullo	52:53.1
6	Russia	53:49.5
7	Spain	54:23.8
8	Slovakia	58:46.1
—	Hungary	Disqualified
