= Jessica Vall =

Spanish swimmer (born 1988)

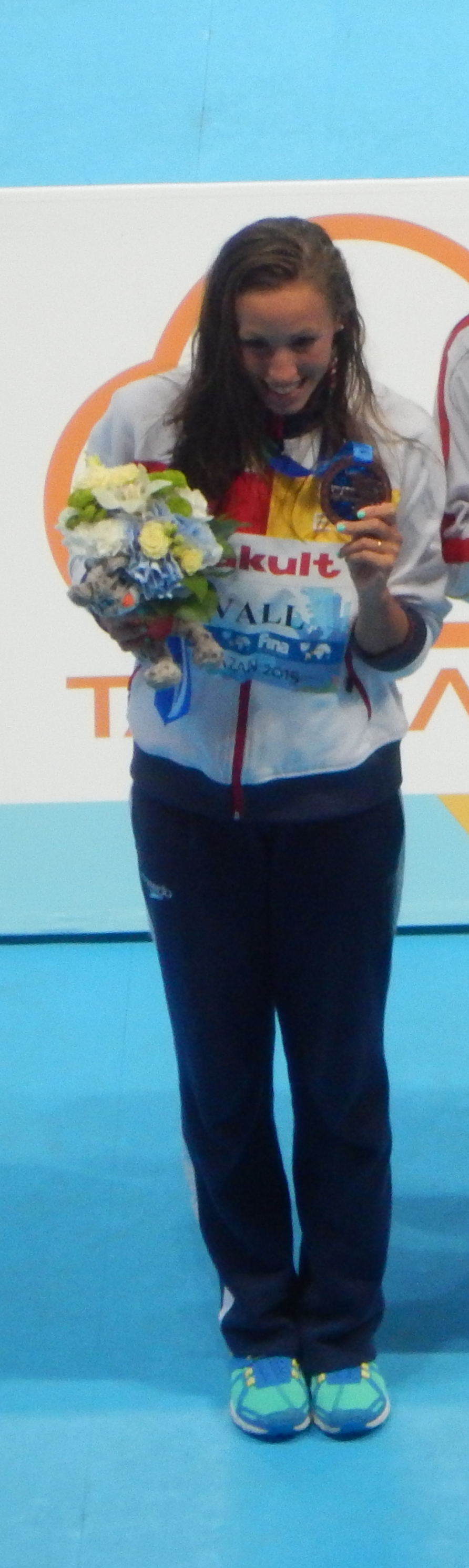

Personal information
- Full name: Jessica Vall Montero
- National team: Spain
- Born: 22 November 1988 (age 37) Barcelona, Spain
- Height: 1.63 m (5 ft 4 in)
- Weight: 52 kg (115 lb)

Sport
- Sport: Swimming
- Strokes: Breaststroke
- Club: Club Natació Sant Andreu
- Coach: Jordi Jou
Medal record
Women's swimming
Representing Spain
World Championships (LC)
Bronze medal – third place	2015 Kazan	200 m breaststroke
European Championships (LC)
Silver medal – second place	2016 London	200 m breaststroke
Silver medal – second place	2018 Glasgow	200 m breaststroke
Bronze medal – third place	2014 Berlin	200 m breaststroke
European Championships (SC)
Gold medal – first place	2017 Copenhagen	200 m breaststroke
Bronze medal – third place	2017 Copenhagen	100 m breaststroke
Mediterranean Games
Gold medal – first place	2013 Mersin	200 m breaststroke
Gold medal – first place	2018 Tarragona	100 m breaststroke
Gold medal – first place	2018 Tarragona	200 m breaststroke
Silver medal – second place	2013 Mersin	100 m breaststroke
Silver medal – second place	2013 Mersin	4 x 100 m medley
Silver medal – second place	2018 Tarragona	4 x 100 m medley
Bronze medal – third place	2018 Tarragona	50 m breaststroke

Jessica Vall Montero (born 22 November 1988) is a Spanish competitive swimmer and breaststroke specialist. She has a degree in Biomedicine from the Universitat Pompeu Fabra and has worked at Barcelona's Biomedical Research Center. She swims for Club Natació Sant Andreu, where she has trained for over five years with her coach Jordi Jou, ex-elite swimmer also for C.N. Sant Andreu. Besides elite training, she is also working towards her master's degree in Bioethics from the Universidad Católica de Murcia (UCAM).

== Biography ==
Jessica Vall debuted internationally in the 2013 Mediterranean Games, where she swam the 200-meter breaststroke, 100-meter breaststroke, and 4 × 100 m medley relay. She won one gold and two silver medals.

She also took part in the 2013 World Aquatics Championships in the 50-meter and 200-meter breaststroke.

A year later, at the 2014 European Aquatics Championships, she won a bronze medal in the 200-meter breaststroke.

In the 2015 World Aquatics Championship in Kazan, Russia, Jessica took the bronze medal in the 200-meter breaststroke, setting a new Spanish record at 2:22:76. She tied for third with Danish swimmer Rikke Moller Pedersen and Chinese swimmer Shi Jinglin.

In 2016, at the Spanish Spring Open held in Sabadell from 19 to 22 March, Vall hit the Olympic minimum in the 100-meter breaststroke during her first swim, thus making her Spain's first member of the swim team going to the 2016 Summer Olympics. She also qualified for the 200-meter breaststroke later in that same meet. Her training partner at Club Natació Sant Andreu, teenage Africa Zamorano, was one of the surprises on the female Olympic squad, mainly made up of veterans: Mireia Belmonte, Melani Costa and Duane da Rocha.

Vall has been honored as Barcelona's "Female Athlete of the Year" by Barcelona's City Council in 2015.

=== International Swimming League ===
In 2019 Vall was member of the 2019 International Swimming League representing Team Iron.
