= Leyre Abadía =

Spanish synchronised swimmer

Personal information
- Full name: Leyre Abadía Ruiz
- Nationality: Spanish
- Born: 22 September 2000 (age 25)

Sport
- Country: Spain
- Sport: Synchronised swimming
Medal record
World Championships
| Bronze medal – third place | 2019 Gwangju | Highlight routine |
European Championships
| Bronze medal – third place | 2018 Glasgow | Free routine combination |

Leyre Abadía Ruiz (Note: In this Spanish name, the first or paternal surname is Abadía and the second or maternal family name is Ruiz.) (born 22 September 2000) is a Spanish synchronised swimmer.

She won a bronze medal in the free routine combination competition at the 2018 European Aquatics Championships.
