= Elena Melián =

Spanish synchronized swimmer

Personal information
- Full name: Elena Melián González
- Nationality: Spanish
- Born: 18 April 2001 (age 25) Las Palmas de Gran Canaria

Sport
- Country: Spain
- Sport: Synchronised swimming
Medal record
World Championships
Bronze medal – third place	2019 Gwangju	Highlight routine
European Championships
Bronze medal – third place	2018 Glasgow	Free routine combination

Elena Melián González (Note: In this Spanish name, the first or paternal surname is Melián and the second or maternal family name is González.) (born 18 April 2001) is a Spanish synchronised swimmer.

She won a bronze medal in the free routine combination competition at the 2018 European Aquatics Championships.
