= Open water swimming at the 2018 European Aquatics Championships – Men's 5 km =

Men's 5 km at the 2018 European Aquatics Championships
- Venue: Loch Lomond
- Dates: 8 August
- Competitors: 24 from 15 nations
- Winning time: 52:38.9

Medalists
gold medal	Kristóf Rasovszky	Hungary
silver medal	Axel Reymond	France
bronze medal	Logan Fontaine	France

The Men's 5 km competition of the 2018 European Aquatics Championships was held on 8 August 2018.

== Results ==
The race was started at 11:10.

Rank	Swimmer	Nationality	Time
1st place, gold medalist(s)	Kristóf Rasovszky	Hungary	52:38.9
2nd place, silver medalist(s)	Axel Reymond	France	52:41.7
3rd place, bronze medalist(s)	Logan Fontaine	France	52:44.4
4	Rob Muffels	Germany	52:55.6
5	Marcello Guidi	Italy	52:56.8
6	Pepijn Smits	Netherlands	52:59.1
7	Marc-Antoine Olivier	France	53:06.7
8	Denis Adeev	Russia	53:09.0
9	Pasquale Sanzullo	Italy	53:10.0
10	Dániel Székelyi	Hungary	53:12.5
11	Ruwen Straub	Germany	53:14.7
12	Guillem Pujol Belmonte	Spain	53:15.1
13	Andrea Manzi	Italy	53:15.7
14	Marcus Herwig	Germany	53:15.7
15	Kirill Abrosimov	Russia	53:16.7
16	Ihor Chervynskyy	Ukraine	53:18.4
17	Sergey Bolshakov	Russia	53:18.8
18	Vít Ingeduld	Czech Republic	53:19.0
19	David Brandl	Austria	53:22.5
20	Tamás Farkas	Serbia	53:22.8
21	Ventsislav Aydarski	Bulgaria	53:24.4
22	Dimitrios Negris	Greece	53:25.2
23	Hector Pardoe	Great Britain	54:41.5
24	Tomáš Peciar	Slovakia	1:01:13.7
