= Open water swimming at the 2018 European Aquatics Championships – Women's 25 km =

Women's 25 km at the 2018 European Aquatics Championships
- Venue: Loch Lomond
- Dates: 12 August
- Competitors: 17 from 7 nations
- Winning time: 5:19:34.6

Medalists
gold medal	Arianna Bridi	Italy
silver medal	Sharon van Rouwendaal	Netherlands
bronze medal	Lara Grangeon	France

The Women's 25 km competition of the 2018 European Aquatics Championships was held on 12 August 2018.

== Results ==
The race was started at 09:10.

Rank	Swimmer	Nationality	Time
1st place, gold medalist(s)	Arianna Bridi	Italy	5:19:34.6
2nd place, silver medalist(s)	Sharon van Rouwendaal	Netherlands	5:19:34.7
3rd place, bronze medalist(s)	Lara Grangeon	France	5:19:42.9
4	Angela Maurer	Germany	5:21:12.5
5	Lisa Pou	France	5:22:32.2
6	Anna Olasz	Hungary	5:24:35.9
7	Esmee Vermeulen	Netherlands	5:24:54.7
8	Anastasiya Krapyvina	Russia	5:24:56.6
9	Aurora Ponsele	Italy	5:25:02.4
10	Onon Sömenek	Hungary	5:28:28.0
11	Olga Kozydub	Russia	5:28:29.1
12	Martina Grimaldi	Italy	5:28:47.9
13	Daria Kulik	Russia	5:32:19.8
14	Lenka Štěrbová	Czech Republic	5:34:14.1
—	Sarah Köhler	Germany	Did not finish
—	Finnia Wunram	Germany	Did not finish
