= Swimming at the 2018 European Aquatics Championships – Men's 400 metre individual medley =

Men's 400 metre individual medley at the 2018 European Aquatics Championships
- Venue: Tollcross International Swimming Centre
- Dates: 9 August
- Competitors: 30 from 22 nations
- Winning time: 4:10.65

Medalists
gold medal	Dávid Verrasztó	Hungary
silver medal	Max Litchfield	Great Britain
bronze medal	Joan Lluís Pons	Spain

The Men's 400 metre individual medley competition of the 2018 European Aquatics Championships was held on 9 August 2018.

== Records ==
Prior to the competition, the existing world and championship records were as follows.

	Name	Nation	Time	Location	Date
World record	Michael Phelps	United States	4:03.84	Beijing	10 August 2008
European record	László Cseh	Hungary	4:06.16	Beijing	10 August 2008
Championship record	László Cseh	Hungary	4:09.59	Eindhoven	24 March 2008

== Results ==
=== Heats ===
The heats were started at 09:00.

Rank	Heat	Lane	Name	Nationality	Time	Notes
1	4	4	Dávid Verrasztó	Hungary	4:14.18	Q
2	3	4	Max Litchfield	Great Britain	4:14.91	Q
3	2	5	Maksym Shemberev	Azerbaijan	4:15.33	Q
4	2	4	João Vital	Portugal	4:15.87	Q
5	3	2	Johannes Hintze	Germany	4:16.18	Q
6	4	3	Joan Lluís Pons	Spain	4:17.01	Q
7	4	1	Maxim Stupin	Russia	4:17.60	Q
8	3	6	Jacob Heidtmann	Germany	4:17.77	Q
9	4	2	Richard Nagy	Slovakia	4:18.58	
10	3	3	Gergely Gyurta	Hungary	4:18.64	
11	3	5	Mark Szaranek	Great Britain	4:19.34	
12	4	7	Federico Turrini	Italy	4:19.74	
13	4	9	Anton Ipsen	Denmark	4:19.89	
14	3	9	Arjan Knipping	Netherlands	4:19.91	
15	4	0	Thomas Dean	Great Britain	4:20.32	
16	4	8	Apostolos Papastamos	Greece	4:20.43	
17	4	5	Jérémy Desplanches	Switzerland	4:20.89	
18	3	0	Adam Paulsson	Sweden	4:21.34	
19	2	9	Gabriel Lópes	Portugal	4:21.57	
20	2	2	Christoph Meier	Liechtenstein	4:21.69	
21	4	6	Patrick Staber	Austria	4:22.48	
22	2	7	Tomás Veloso	Portugal	4:22.57	
23	3	8	Dawid Szwedzki	Poland	4:23.69	
24	2	6	Etay Gurevich	Israel	4:25.31	
25	2	1	Semen Makovich	Russia	4:25.88	
26	2	8	Samet Alkan	Turkey	4:27.57	
27	1	4	Alpkan Örnek	Turkey	4:27.71	
28	2	0	Filip Chrápavý	Czech Republic	4:29.48	
29	1	5	Alvi Hjelm	Faroe Islands	4:30.47	
30	1	2	Thomas Wareing	Malta	4:44.13	
	1	3	Batuhan Hakan	Turkey	Did not start	
	1	6	Armin Lelle	Estonia	Did not start	
	1	7	Metin Aydın	Turkey	Did not start	
	2	3	Brodie Williams	Great Britain	Did not start	
	3	1	Alexis Santos	Portugal	Did not start	
	3	7	Balázs Holló	Hungary	Did not start	

=== Final ===
The final was started at 17:27.

Rank	Lane	Name	Nationality	Time	Notes
1st place, gold medalist(s)	4	Dávid Verrasztó	Hungary	4:10.65	
2nd place, silver medalist(s)	5	Max Litchfield	Great Britain	4:11.00	
3rd place, bronze medalist(s)	7	Joan Lluís Pons	Spain	4:14.26	
4	2	Johannes Hintze	Germany	4:14.73	
5	3	Maksym Shemberev	Azerbaijan	4:14.77	
6	8	Jacob Heidtmann	Germany	4:16.29	
7	1	Maxim Stupin	Russia	4:18.41	
8	6	João Vital	Portugal	4:19.79	
