= Fantine Lesaffre =

French swimmer

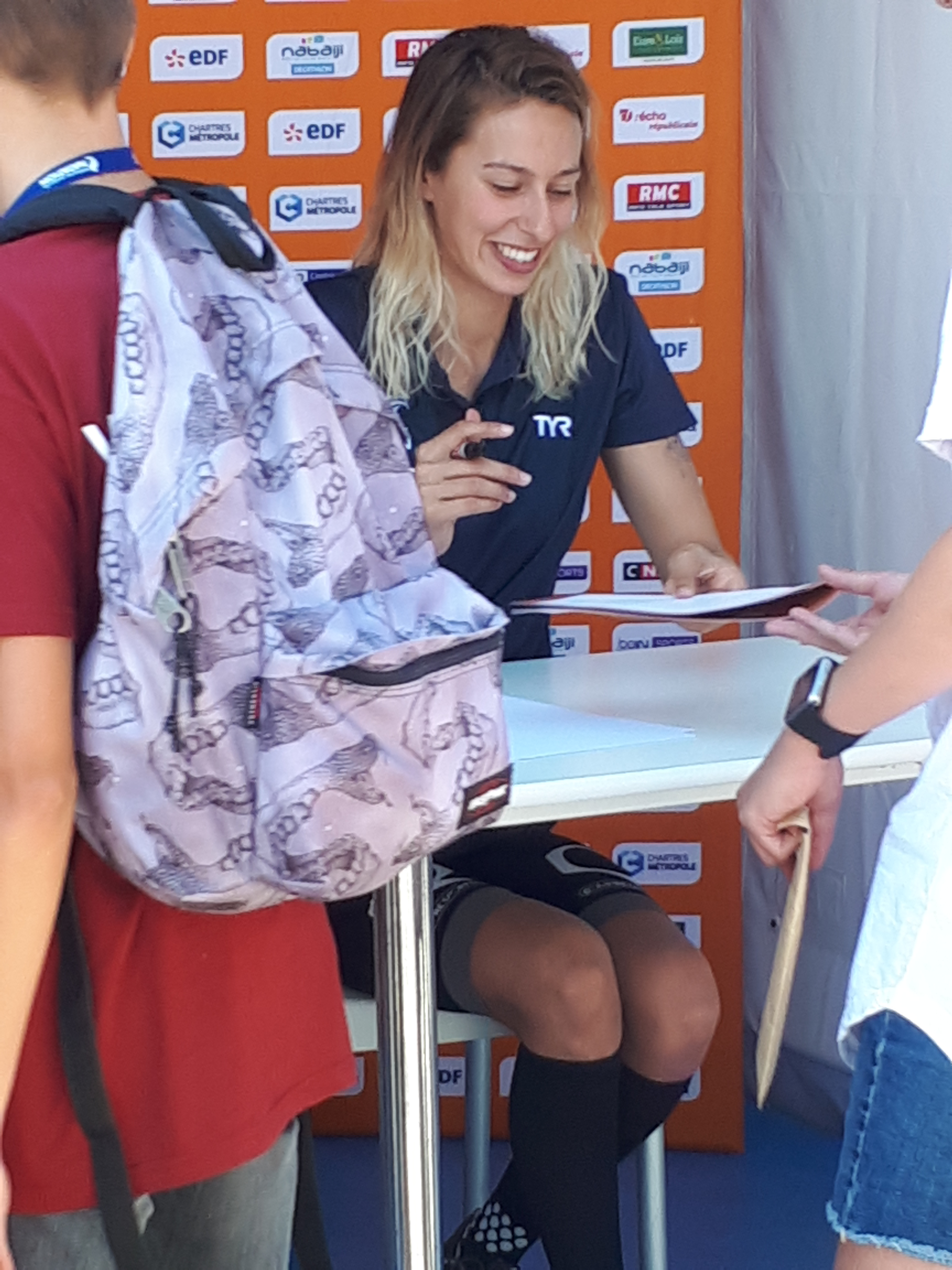
- Lesaffre in 2018

Personal information
- Nationality: French
- Born: 10 November 1994 (age 31) Roubaix, France

Sport
- Sport: Swimming
- Strokes: Individual medley
- Club: Energy Standard
Medal record
World Championships (SC)
Bronze medal – third place	2018 Hangzhou	400 m medley
European Championships (LC)
Gold medal – first place	2018 Glasgow	400 m medley
European Championships (SC)
Bronze medal – third place	2017 Copenhagen	400 m medley

Fantine Lesaffre (born 10 November 1994) is a French swimmer. She is the European champion in 400 metre individual medley event at the 2018 Glasgow.

In the Autumn of 2019 she was member of the inaugural International Swimming League swimming for the Energy Standard International Swim Club, who won the team title in Las Vegas, Nevada, in December.
