= Swimming at the 2018 European Aquatics Championships – Women's 400 metre individual medley =

Women's 400 metre individual medley at the 2018 European Aquatics Championships
- Venue: Tollcross International Swimming Centre
- Dates: 3 August
- Competitors: 21 from 14 nations
- Winning time: 4:34.17

Medalists
gold medal	Fantine Lesaffre	France
silver medal	Ilaria Cusinato	Italy
bronze medal	Hannah Miley	Great Britain

The Women's 400 metre individual medley competition of the 2018 European Aquatics Championships was held on 3 August 2018.

== Records ==
Before the competition, the existing world and championship records were as follows.

	Name	Nation	Time	Location	Date
World record European record	Katinka Hosszú	Hungary	4:26.36	Rio de Janeiro	6 August 2016
Championship record	Katinka Hosszú	Hungary	4:30.90	London	16 May 2016

== Results ==
=== Heats ===
The heats were started at 09:30.

Rank	Heat	Lane	Name	Nationality	Time	Notes
1	3	3	Fantine Lesaffre	France	4:36.17	Q
2	2	4	Aimee Willmott	Great Britain	4:38.28	Q
3	3	4	Ilaria Cusinato	Italy	4:39.02	Q
4	2	6	Zsuzsanna Jakabos	Hungary	4:39.26	Q
5	3	5	Hannah Miley	Great Britain	4:39.52	Q
6	2	5	Catalina Corró	Spain	4:40.69	Q
7	2	2	Anja Crevar	Serbia	4:40.99	Q
8	2	3	Carlotta Toni	Italy	4:42.06	Q
9	3	7	Alessia Polieri	Italy	4:42.07	
10	3	2	Abbie Wood	Great Britain	4:43.80	
11	3	1	Victoria Kaminskaya	Portugal	4:44.22	
12	2	1	Barbora Závadová	Czech Republic	4:46.87	
13	3	6	Viktoriya Zeynep Güneş	Turkey	4:47.63	
14	2	7	Cyrielle Duhamel	France	4:48.32	
15	2	8	Paulina Żukowska	Poland	4:49.76	
16	3	8	Aleksandra Knop	Poland	4:51.65	
17	1	4	Vilma Ruotsalainen	Finland	4:56.41	
18	1	3	Shahar Menahem	Israel	4:58.42	
19	3	0	Irina Krivonogova	Russia	4:58.73	
20	1	5	Nikoleta Trníková	Slovakia	5:02.59	
21	2	0	Lea Polonsky	Israel	5:05.48	

=== Final ===
The final was held at 17:00.

Rank	Lane	Name	Nationality	Time	Notes
1st place, gold medalist(s)	4	Fantine Lesaffre	France	4:34.17	
2nd place, silver medalist(s)	3	Ilaria Cusinato	Italy	4:35.05	
3rd place, bronze medalist(s)	2	Hannah Miley	Great Britain	4:35.34	
4	5	Aimee Willmott	Great Britain	4:35.77	
5	6	Zsuzsanna Jakabos	Hungary	4:38.48	
6	7	Catalina Corró	Spain	4:38.83	
7	8	Carlotta Toni	Italy	4:40.18	
8	1	Anja Crevar	Serbia	4:41.40	
