= Open water swimming at the 2018 European Aquatics Championships – Women's 10 km =

Women's 10 km at the 2018 European Aquatics Championships
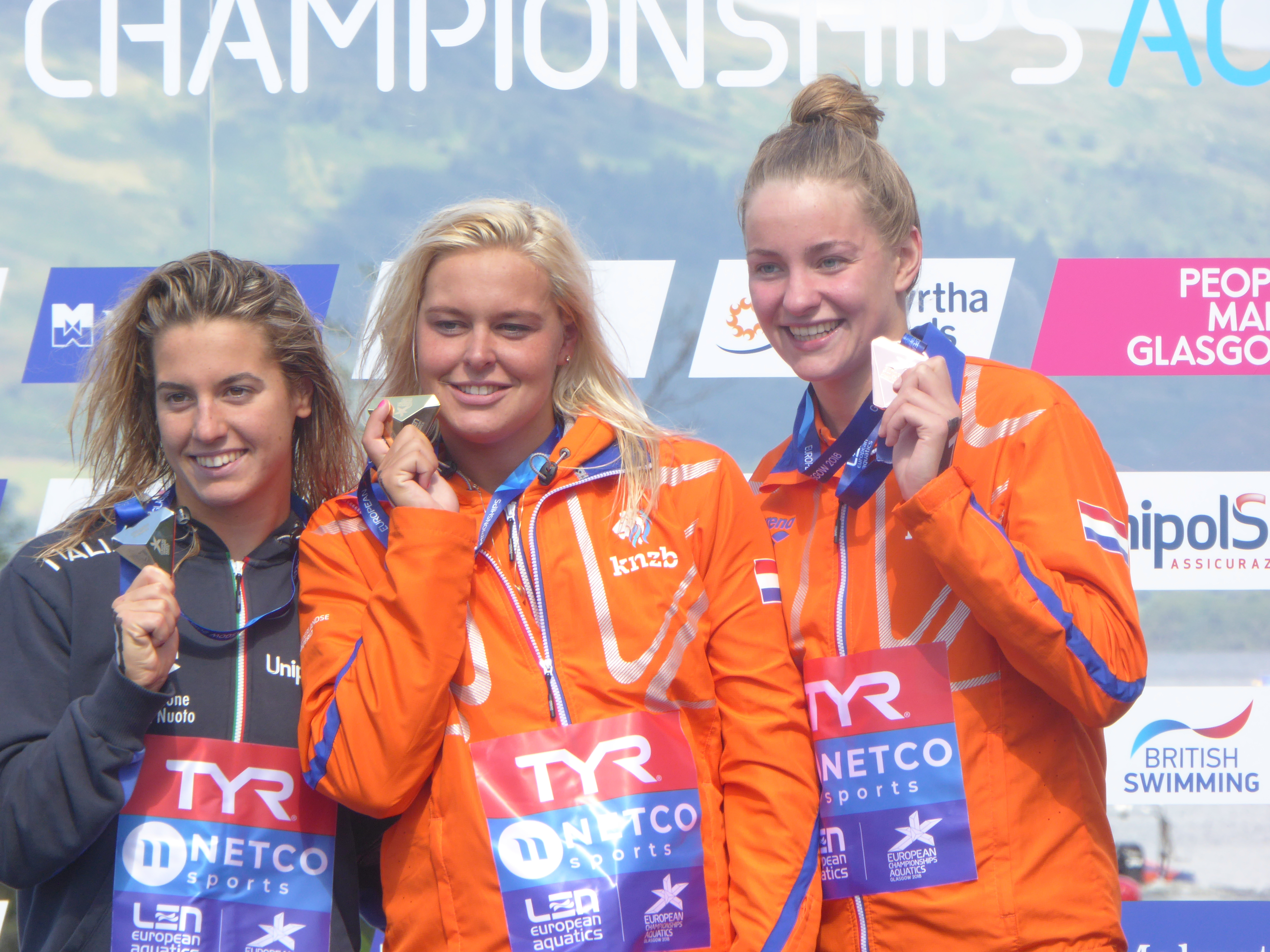
- The medallists (from left to right): Giulia Gabbrielleschi (silver), Sharon van Rouwendaal (gold) and Esmee Vermeulen (bronze)
- Venue: Loch Lomond
- Dates: 9 August
- Competitors: 31 from 16 nations
- Winning time: 1:54:45.7

Medalists
gold medal	Sharon van Rouwendaal	Netherlands
silver medal	Giulia Gabbrielleschi	Italy
bronze medal	Esmee Vermeulen	Netherlands

The Women's 10 km competition of the 2018 European Aquatics Championships was held on 9 August 2018.

== Results ==
The race was started at 09:30.

Rank	Swimmer	Nationality	Time
1st place, gold medalist(s)	Sharon van Rouwendaal	Netherlands	1:54:45.7
2nd place, silver medalist(s)	Giulia Gabrielleschi	Italy	1:54:53.0
3rd place, bronze medalist(s)	Esmee Vermeulen	Netherlands	1:55:27.4
4	Rachele Bruni	Italy	1:55:40.6
5	Finnia Wunram	Germany	1:56:26.5
6	Lara Grangeon	France	1:57:22.0
7	Lisa Pou	France	1:57:22.8
8	Arianna Bridi	Italy	1:57:27.1
9	Leonie Beck	Germany	1:57:32.6
10	Paula Ruiz Bravo	Spain	1:57:43.2
11	Anna Olasz	Hungary	1:57:43.8
12	Alice Dearing	Great Britain	1:58:39.3
13	Sofia Kolesnikova	Russia	1:58:41.3
14	Jazmin Carlin	Great Britain	1:58:46.0
15	Danielle Huskisson	Great Britain	1:59:37.3
16	Adeline Furst	France	1:59:37.5
17	Alena Benešová	Czech Republic	2:00:49.2
18	Onon Sömenek	Hungary	2:02:12.4
19	Špela Perše	Slovenia	2:02:21.9
20	Melinda Novoszáth	Hungary	2:02:28.9
21	Jeannette Spiwoks	Germany	2:02:29.0
22	María de Valdés Álvarez	Spain	2:02:42.9
23	Lenka Štěrbová	Czech Republic	2:04:22.9
24	Eden Girloanta	Israel	2:04:24.0
25	Anastasiya Krapyvina	Russia	2:05:46.9
26	Krystyna Panchishko	Ukraine	2:09:45.0
27	Carmen Mikušová	Slovakia	2:10:01.5
28	Lucija Aralica	Croatia	2:15:38.3
—	Kalliopi Araouzou	Greece	Did not finish
—	Angélica André	Portugal	Did not finish
—	Mariia Novikova	Russia	Disqualified
