= Alberto Martínez (swimmer) =

Spanish swimmer

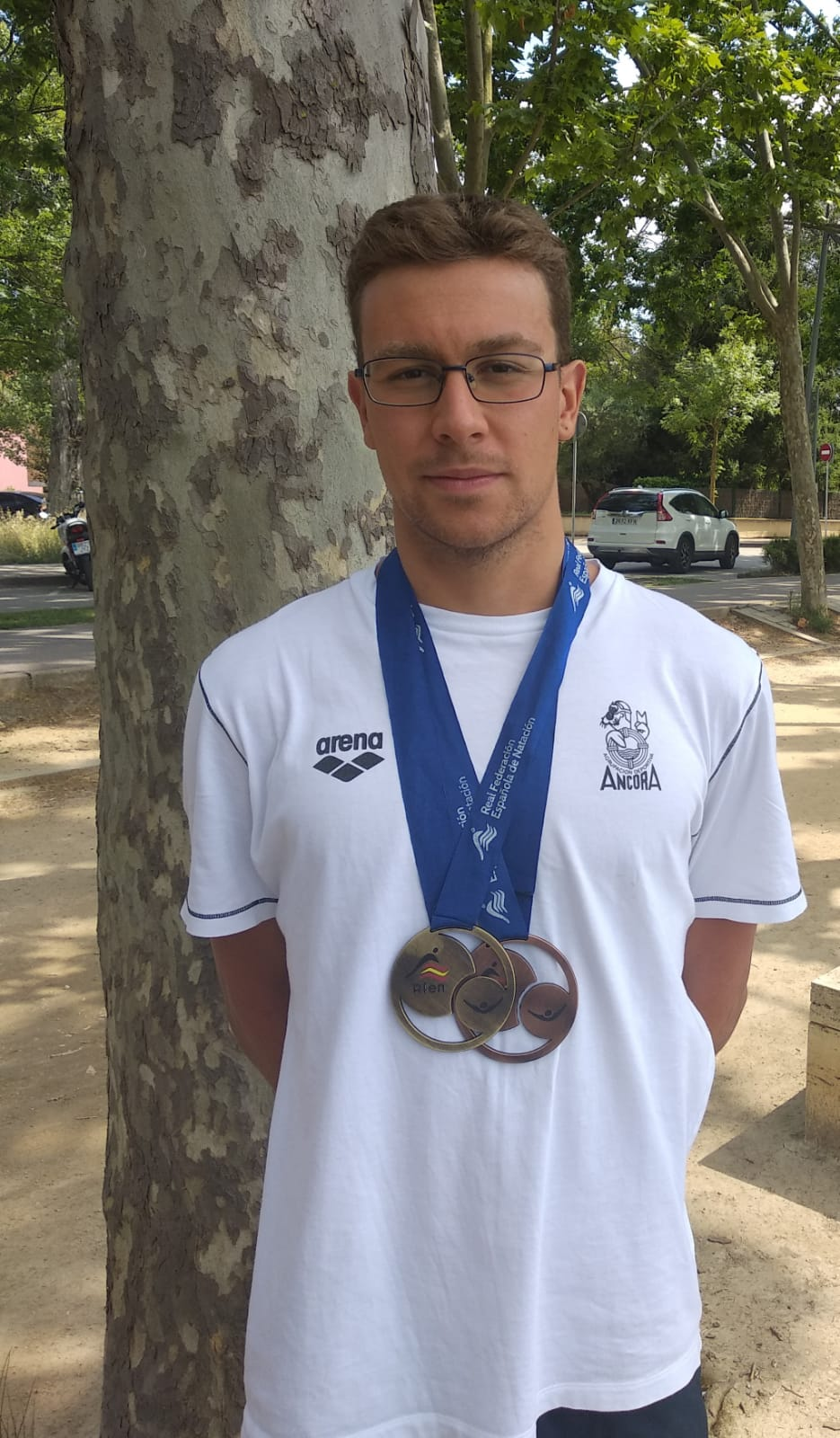

Personal information
- Full name: Alberto Martínez Murcia
- Born: 27 June 1998 (age 28) Cartagena, Spain
- Height: 178 cm (5 ft 10 in)
- Weight: 68 kg (150 lb)

Sport
- Country: Spain
- Sport: Swimming
- Event: Marathon swimming

Alberto Martínez Murcia (Note: In this Spanish name, the first or paternal surname is Martínez and the second or maternal family name is Murcia.) (born 27 June 1998) is a Spanish marathon swimmer. He competed in the 2020 Summer Olympics.
