= Marathon swimming at the Summer Olympics =

- IOC Code: OWS
- Governing body: World Aquatics
- Events: 2 (men: 1; women: 1)

Summer Olympics
- 1896; 1900; 1904; 1908; 1912; 1920; 1924; 1928; 1932; 1936; 1948; 1952; 1956; 1960; 1964; 1968; 1972; 1976; 1980; 1984; 1988; 1992; 1996; 2000; 2004; 2008; 2012; 2016; 2020; 2024; 2028; 2032
- Medalists

Marathon swimming has been included in the Summer Olympics since the 2008 Games. The discipline of marathon swimming is part of the Olympic sport of aquatics alongside artistic swimming, diving, swimming and water polo. The current Olympic program consists of a Men's 10 kilometre event and a Women's 10 kilometre event.

All swimming races in 1896, 1900 and 1904 took place in open water before they moved to pools at London 1908, but it wasn’t until Beijing 2008 that marathon swimming officially became an Olympic discipline.

== Summary ==
Games	Year	Events	Best nation
29	2008	2	Netherlands (1); Russia (1)
30	2012	2	Hungary (1); Tunisia (1)
31	2016	2	Netherlands (2)
32	2020	2	Brazil (1); Germany (1)
33	2024	2	Hungary (2)
34	2028	2	

== Events ==
Event	08	12	16	20	24	28	Years
Men's 10km	X	X	X	X	X	X	6
Women's 10km	X	X	X	X	X	X	6
Total Events	2	2	2	2	2	2	

== Medalists ==
=== Men's events ===
==== 10 km marathon ====
Games	Gold		Silver		Bronze	
2008 Beijing	Maarten van der Weijden; Netherlands	1:51:51.6	David Davies; Great Britain	1:51:53.1	Thomas Lurz; Germany	1:51:53.6
2012 London	Oussama Mellouli; Tunisia	1:49:55.1	Thomas Lurz; Germany	1:49:58.5	Richard Weinberger; Canada	1:50:00.3
2016 Rio de Janeiro	Ferry Weertman; Netherlands	1:52:59.8	Spyridon Gianniotis; Greece	1:53:00.5	Marc-Antoine Olivier; France	1:53:02.0
2020 Tokyo	Florian Wellbrock; Germany	1:48:33.7	Kristof Rasovszky; Hungary	1:48:59.0	Gregorio Paltrinieri; Italy	1:49:01.1
2024 Paris	Kristóf Rasovszky; Hungary	1:50:52.7	Oliver Klemet; Germany	1:50:54.8	Dávid Betlehem; Hungary	1:51:09.0
2028 Los Angeles						

=== Women's events ===
==== 10 km marathon ====
Games	Gold		Silver		Bronze	
2008 Beijing	Larisa Ilchenko; Russia	1:59:27.7	Keri-Anne Payne; Great Britain	1:59:29.2	Cassandra Patten; Great Britain	1:59:31.0
2012 London	Éva Risztov; Hungary	1:57:38.2	Haley Anderson; United States	1:57:38.6	Martina Grimaldi; Italy	1:57:41.8
2016 Rio de Janeiro	Sharon van Rouwendaal; Netherlands	1:56:32.1	Rachele Bruni; Italy	1:56:49.5	Poliana Okimoto; Brazil	1:56:51.4
2020 Tokyo	Ana Marcela Cunha; Brazil	1:59:30.8	Sharon van Rouwendaal; Netherlands	1:59:31.7	Kareena Lee; Australia	1:59:32.5
2024 Paris	Sharon van Rouwendaal; Netherlands	2:03:34.2	Moesha Johnson; Australia	2:03:39.7	Ginevra Taddeucci; Italy	2:03:42.8
2028 Los Angeles						

== Medal table ==
As of the conclusion of the 2024 Olympics, thirteen NOCs have won Olympic medals across 10 events.

Rank	Nation	Gold	Silver	Bronze	Total
1	Netherlands	4	1	0	5
2	Hungary	2	1	1	4
3	Germany	1	2	1	4
4	Brazil	1	0	1	2
5	Russia	1	0	0	1
5	Tunisia	1	0	0	1
7	Great Britain	0	2	1	3
8	Italy	0	1	3	4
9	Australia	0	1	1	2
10	Greece	0	1	0	1
10	United States	0	1	0	1
12	Canada	0	0	1	1
12	France	0	0	1	1
Totals (13 entries)		10	10	10	30

== Nations ==
Nation	96	00	04	08	12	20	24	28	32	36	48	52	56	60	64	68	72	76	80	84	88	92	96	00	04	08	12	16	20	24	Years
Algeria																													1		1
Argentina																										2	1		1		3
Australia																										2	2	2	2	4	5
Austria																														2	1
Belgium																										1	1				2
Brazil																										3	1	3	1	3	5
Bulgaria																										1	1	1			3
Canada																											2	2	2	1	4
Chile																										1					1
China																										2	1	2	1	1	5
Croatia																											1				1
Czech Republic																										2	1	1	1	1	5
Ecuador																											1	2	2	1	4
Egypt																										1	1	2			3
France																										2	2	2	3	4	5
Germany																										2	3	2	4	4	5
Great Britain																										3	2	2	2	3	5
Greece																										2	2	2	1	1	5
Guam																											1				1
Hong Kong																											1		1		2
Hungary																										1	2	3	2	3	5
Ireland																														1	1
Israel																													1	1	2
Italy																										2	2	3	3	4	5
Japan																											2	2	2	2	4
Kazakhstan																											1	1	1		3
Malaysia																											1	1			2
Mexico																										2	1		1	2	4
Monaco																														1	1
Namibia																													1	1	2
Netherlands																										2		2	2	1	4
New Zealand																												1			1
Norway																														1	1
Peru																														1	1
Poland																											1	1		1	3
Portugal																										2	1	1	2	1	5
Russia																										3	3	2	2		4
Singapore																													1		1
Slovakia																												1			1
Slovenia																										1		1	1		3
South Africa																										2	2	2	2		4
Spain																										2	2	1	2	3	5
Sweden																										1				1	2
Switzerland																										1	1				2
Syria																										1					1
Tunisia																											1	1	1	1	4
Turkey																														2	1
Ukraine																										2	2		1		3
United States																										2	2	3	3	3	5
Venezuela																										2	2	2	1		4
Nations																										28	33	29	31	29	
Swimmers																										50	50	51	51	55	

== See also ==
- List of Olympic venues in marathon swimming
