= List of Olympic venues in marathon swimming =

For the Summer Olympics there are 7 venues that have been or will be used for marathon swimming. Although swimming initially took place in open water during the early Olympics of 1896, 1900 and 1904 before moving to pools, it wasn't until 2008 Games that marathon swimming was officially introduced.

Games	Venue	Other sports hosted at venue for those games	Type	Capacity	Ref.
2008 Beijing	Shunyi Olympic Rowing-Canoeing Park	Canoeing, Rowing	Canal	37,000	
2012 London	Hyde Park	Triathlon	Lake	3,000	
2016 Rio de Janeiro	Fort Copacabana	Cycling (road), Triathlon	Ocean	5,000	
2020 Tokyo	Odaiba Marine Park	Triathlon	Bay	tbc	
2024 Paris	Pont d'Iéna	Athletics (marathon, race walk), Cycling (road, time trial), Triathlon	River	tbc	
2028 Los Angeles	Long Beach Waterfront	BMX racing, Water polo, Triathlon	Bay	2,000	
2032 Brisbane	Southport Broadwater Parklands	Triathlon	Ocean	5,000	

== Gallery of venues ==
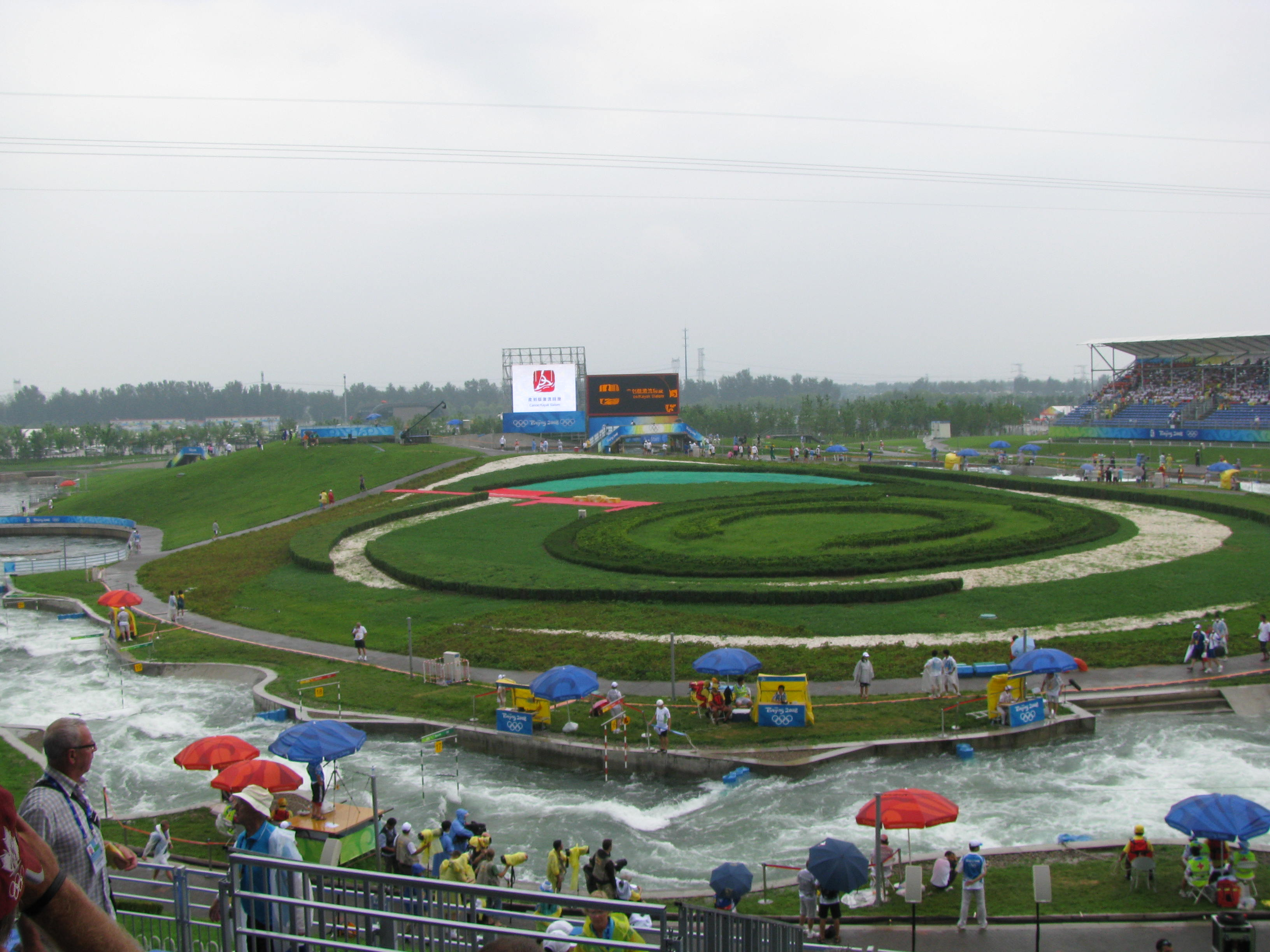
Shunyi Olympic Rowing-Canoeing Park in Beijing hosted the inaugural 2008 Summer Olympic marathon swimming competitions.

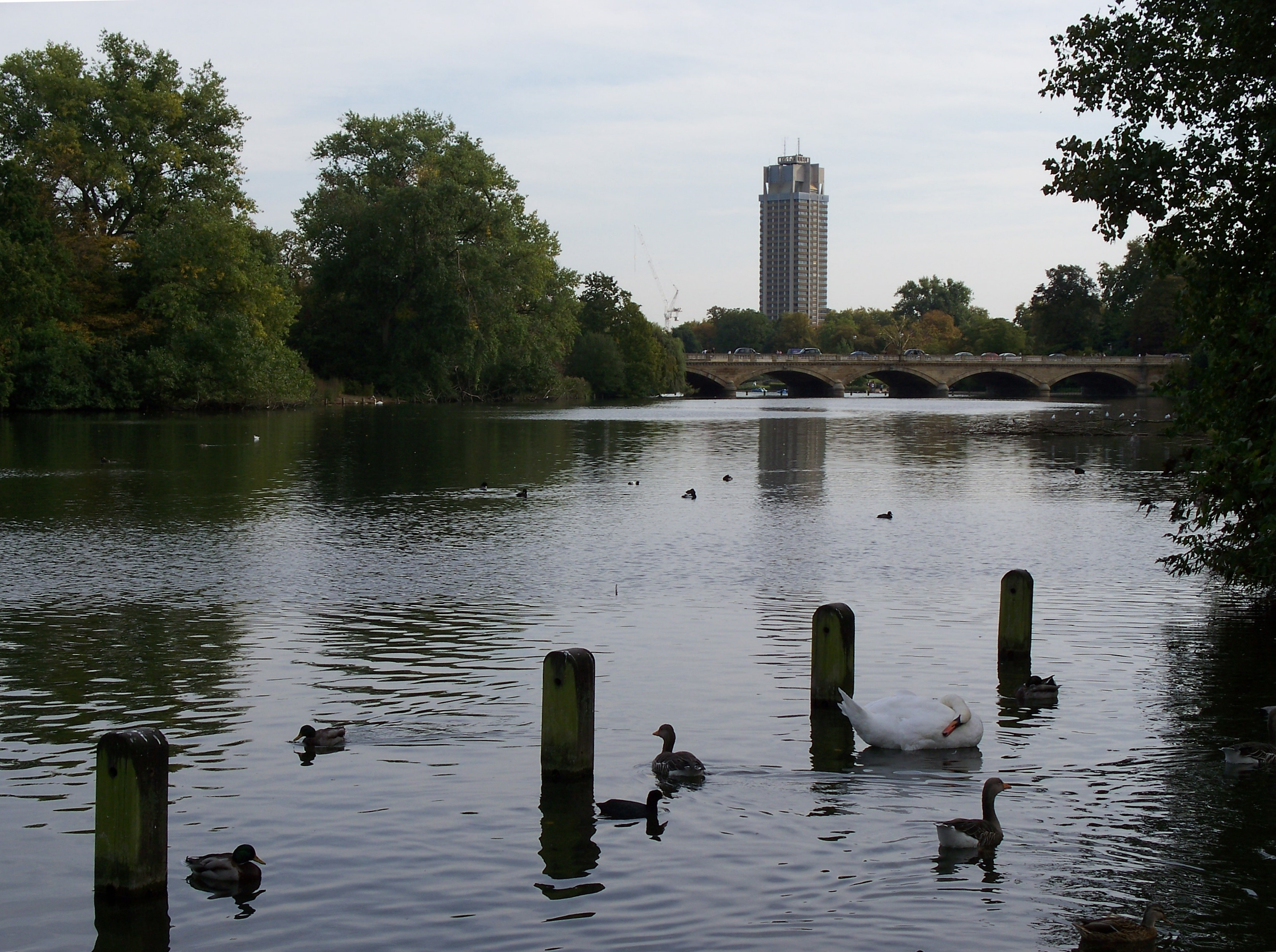
The Serpentine hosted marathon swimming at the 2012 Summer Olympics in London.

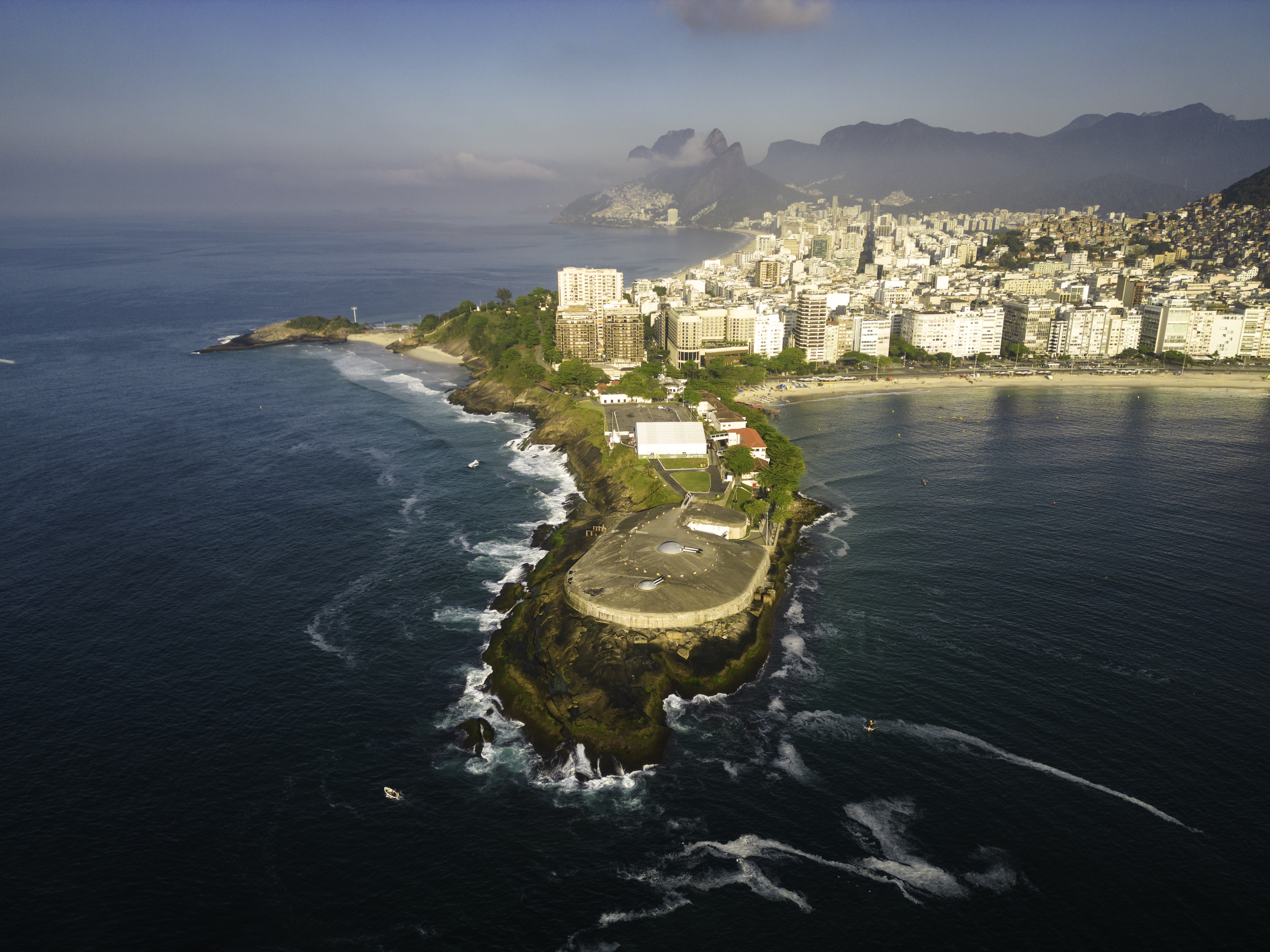
Fort Copacabana hosted marathon swimming at the 2016 Summer Olympics in Rio de Janeiro.

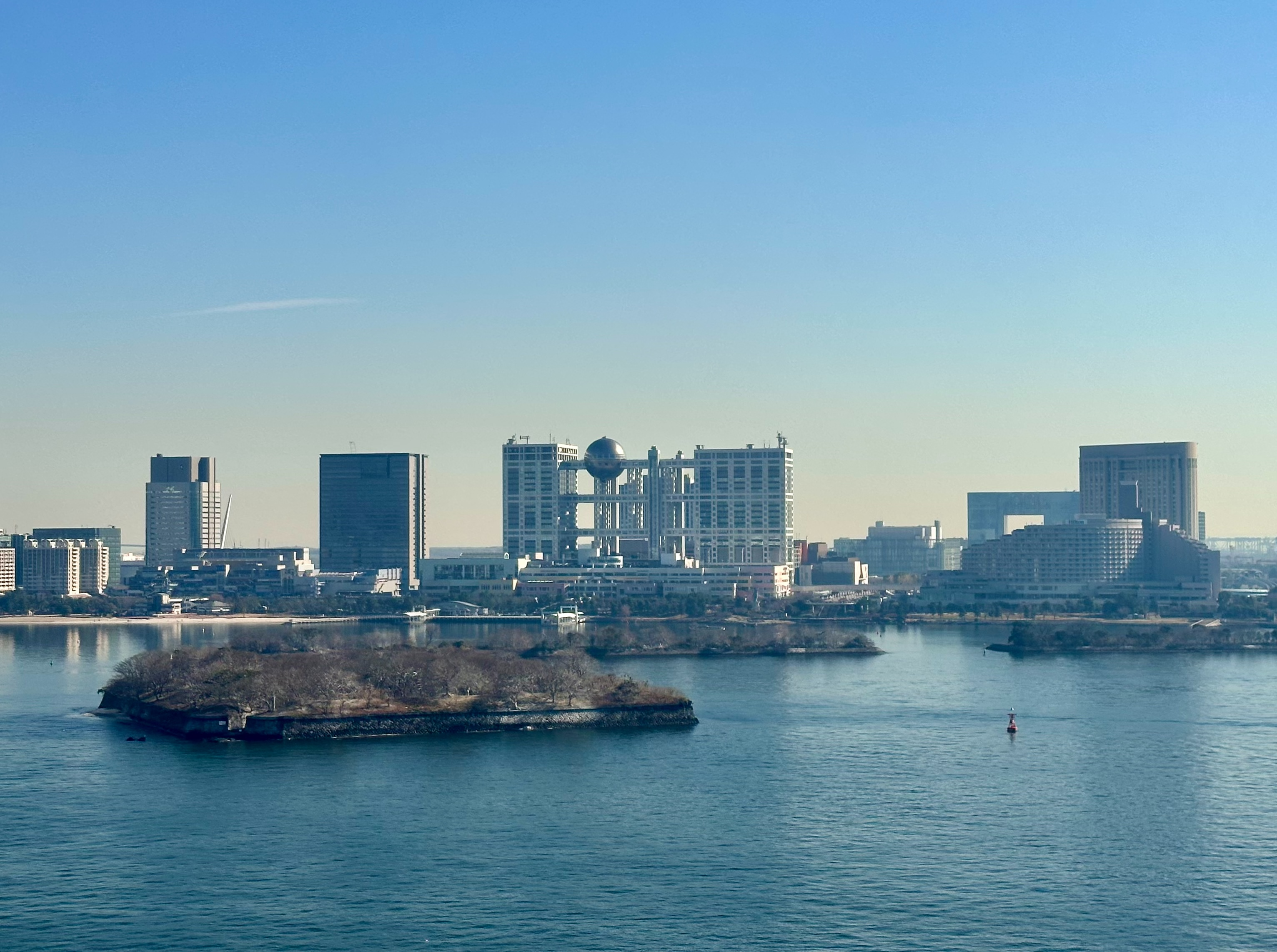
Odaiba hosted marathon swimming at the 2020 Summer Olympics in Tokyo.

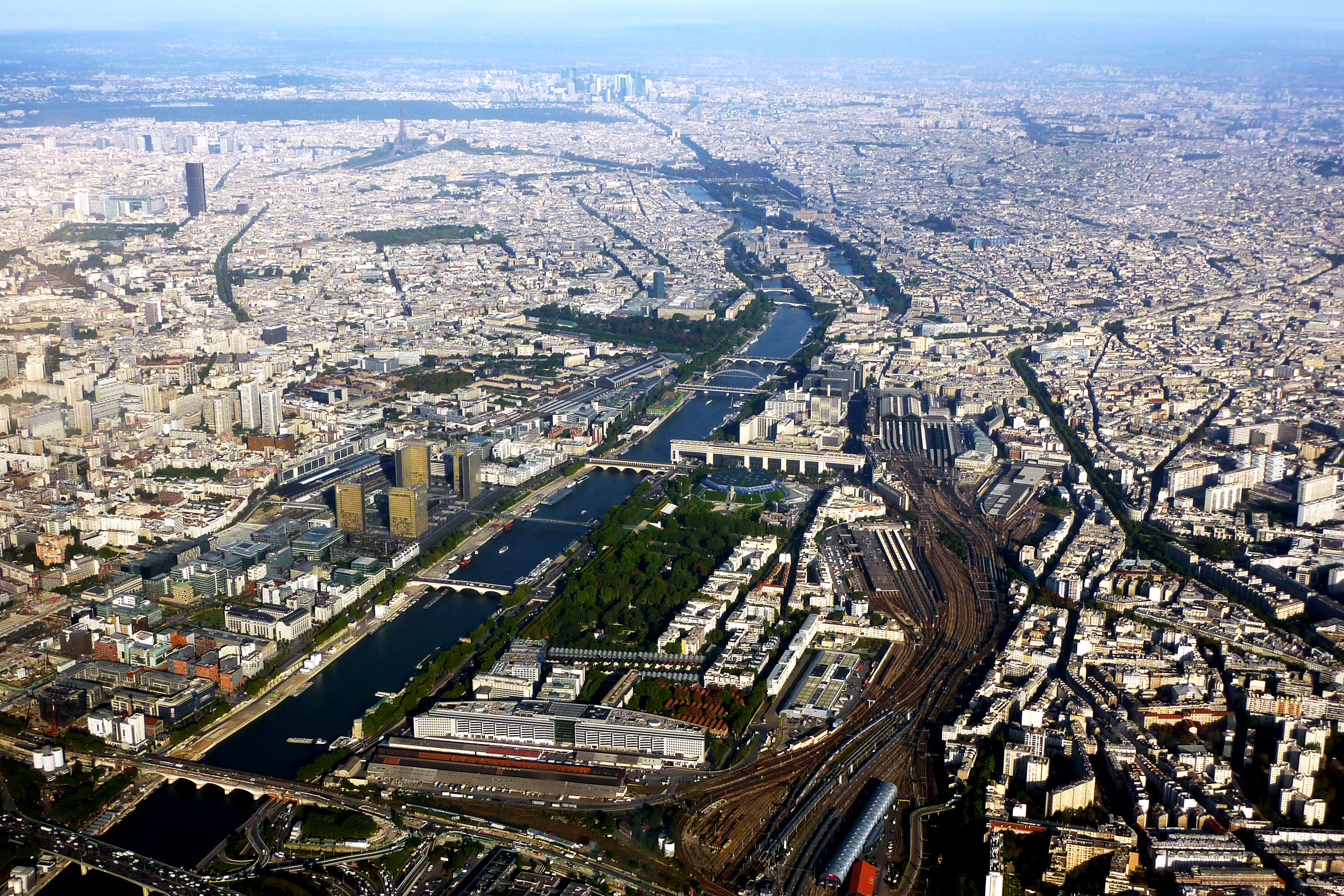
The Seine hosted marathon swimming at the 2024 Summer Olympics in Paris.

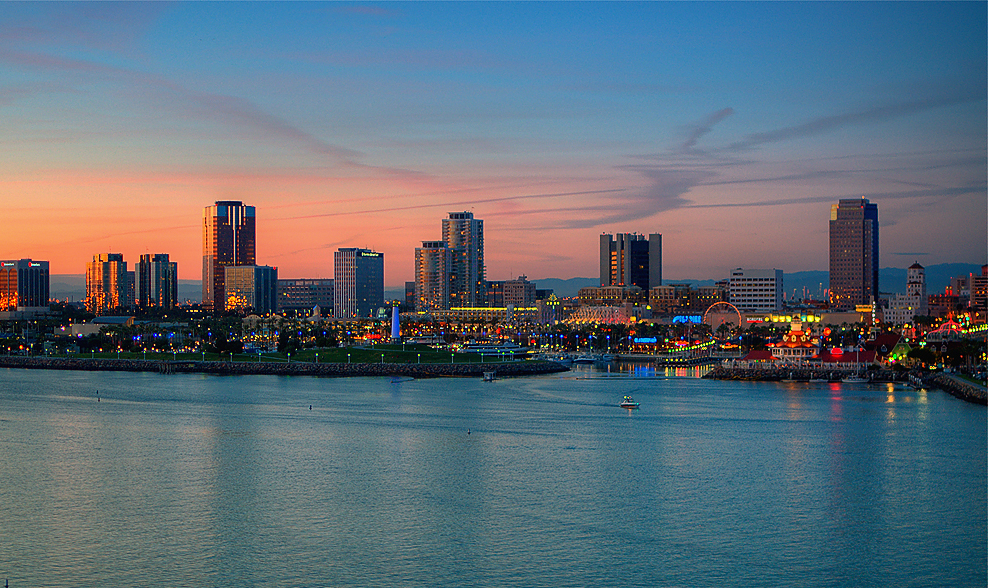
The Long Beach waterfront will host marathon swimming at the 2028 Summer Olympics in Los Angeles.
