= Marathon swimming at the 2016 Summer Olympics =

Marathon swimming at the Games of the XXXI Olympiad
- Venue: Fort Copacabana
- Dates: 15–16 August
- No. of events: 2
- Competitors: 51 from 29 nations

The marathon swimming competitions at the 2016 Summer Olympics in Rio de Janeiro took place on 15 and 16 August. The women's open-water marathon was held on August 15, and the men's open water race on August 16 in Fort Copacabana.

== Open water quality ==
The location for open-water events was a source of concern for athletes since scientists have found microbes in the waters off of Fort Copacabana and drug-resistant super bacteria off the beaches of Rio de Janeiro in 2014 and 2016 studies due to the daily dumping of hospital waste and household raw sewage into the rivers and ocean. Ten percent of the Copacabana water test samples contained drug-resistant super bacteria. However, during the races the water quality was good.

== Events ==
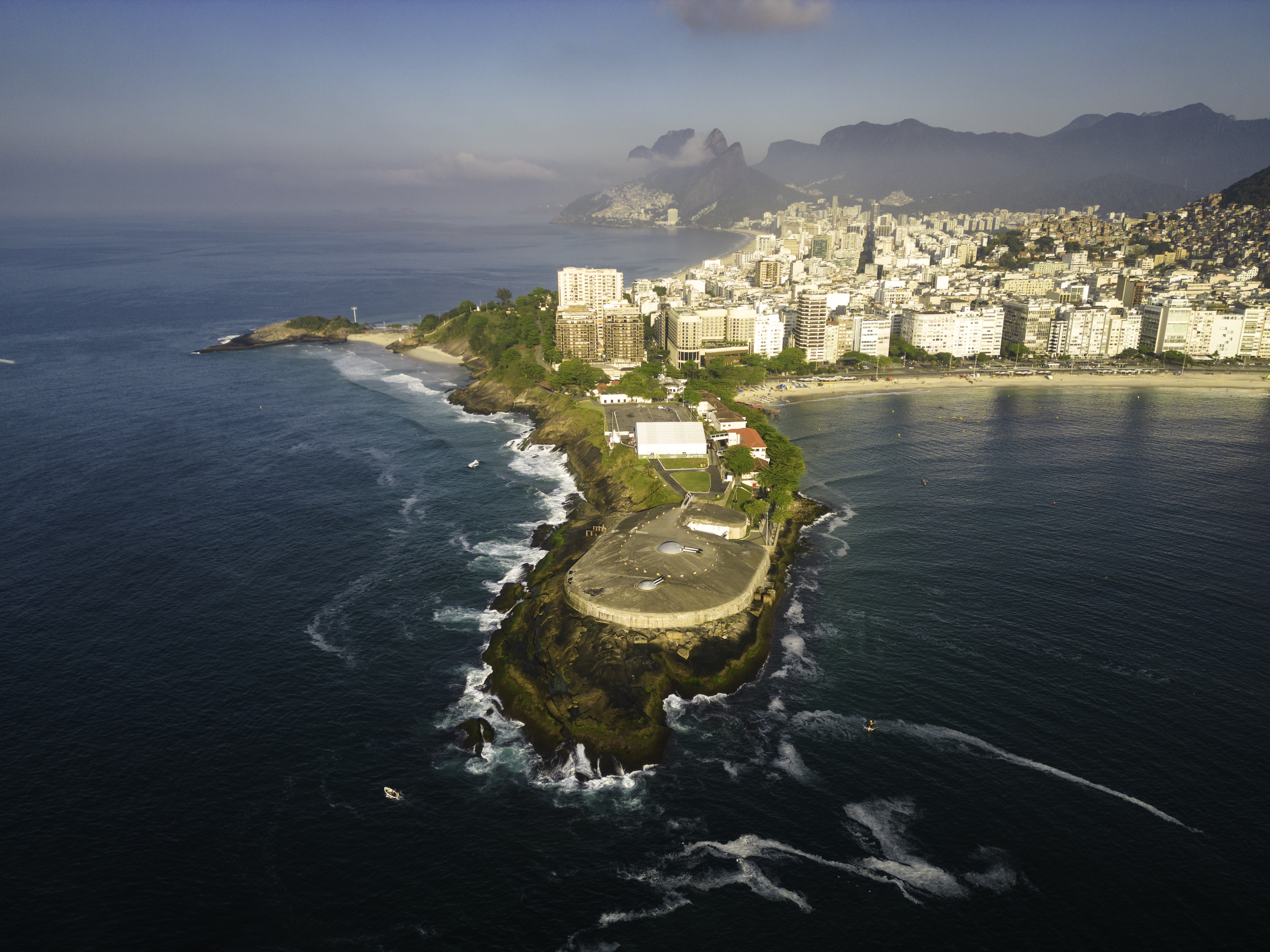
View of Fort Copacabana, the venue used for marathon swimming at the 2016 Summer Olympics.

Similar to the program's format in 2012, marathon swimming features a total of 2 events (1 each for men and women), consisting of two 10 km open-water marathons.

=== Schedule ===
Both events started at 9:00 am local time, with the women's event on 15 August and the men's event on 16 August.

== Qualification ==
FINA By-Law BL 9.3.7.5.3 laid out the qualification procedures for the "Marathon swimming" competition at the Olympics. Each country is allowed to enter up to two swimmers per individual event (provided they qualify).

The men's and women's 10 km races at the 2016 Summer Olympics featured 25 swimmers:

- 10: the top-10 finishers in the 10 km races at the 2015 World Championships
- 9: the top-9 finishers at the 2016 Olympic Marathon Swim Qualifier (June 11–12, 2016 in Setúbal, Portugal)
- 5: one representative from each FINA continent (Africa, Americas, Asia, Europe and Oceania). (These have been selected based on the finishes at the qualifying race in Setúbal.)
- 1: from the host nation (Brazil) if not qualified by other means. If Brazil already contained a qualifier in the race, this spot had been allocated back into the general pool from the 2016 Olympic qualifier race.

=== Timeline ===
Event	Date	Venue
2015 World Aquatics Championships	24 July – 9 August 2015	(Russia) Kazan
2016 FINA Olympic Marathon Swim Qualifier	11–12 June 2016	(Portugal) Setúbal
Re-allocation of unused quota	12–18 June 2016	–

=== Men's 10 km marathon ===
Qualification event	No. of athletes	Qualified athletes
2015 World Championships	10	Jordan Wilimovsky (USA); Ferry Weertman (NED); Spyridon Gianniotis (GRE); Sean Ryan (USA); Jack Burnell (GBR); Marc-Antoine Olivier (FRA); Simone Ruffini (ITA); Richard Weinberger (CAN); Allan do Carmo (BRA); Federico Vanelli (ITA)
2016 Olympic Marathon Swim Qualifier	10	Zu Lijun (CHN); Christian Reichert (GER); Ivan Enderica Ochoa (ECU); Evgeny Drattsev (RUS); Richárd Nagy (SVK); Oussama Mellouli (TUN); Jarrod Poort (AUS); Yasunari Hirai (JPN); Chad Ho (RSA); Ventsislav Aydarski (BUL)°
Continental Qualifier	5	Márk Papp (HUN); Erwin Maldonado (VEN); Kane Radford (NZL); Vitaliy Khudyakov (KAZ); Marwan El-Amrawy (EGY)
Total	25	

° Unused host quota place
^ Unused continental quota place

=== Women's 10 km marathon ===
Qualification event	No. of athletes	Qualified athletes
2015 World Championships	10	Aurélie Muller (FRA); Sharon van Rouwendaal (NED); Ana Marcela Cunha (BRA); Rachele Bruni (ITA); Anastasiya Krapyvina (RUS); Poliana Okimoto (BRA); Isabelle Härle (GER); Kalliopi Araouzou (GRE); Haley Anderson (USA); Éva Risztov (HUN); Anna Olasz (HUN)
2016 Olympic Marathon Swim Qualifier	10	Xin Xin (CHN); Keri-anne Payne (GBR); Samantha Arévalo (ECU); Chelsea Gubecka (AUS); Yumi Kida (JPN); Michelle Weber (RSA); Joanna Zachoszcz (POL); Paola Pérez (VEN); Špela Perše (SLO); Jana Pechanová (CZE)° Erika Villaécija (ESP)^
Continental Qualifier	5	Vânia Neves (POR); Stephanie Horner (CAN); Heidi Gan (MAS); Reem Kaseem (EGY)
Total	25	

° Unused host quota place
^ Unused continental quota place

== Participation ==
=== Participating nations ===
Brazil, as the host country, receives guaranteed quota place in case it would not qualify any qualification places.

- Australia (2)
- Brazil (3)
- Bulgaria (1)
- Canada (2)
- China (2)
- Czech Republic (1)
- Ecuador (2)
- Egypt (2)
- France (2)
- Germany (2)
- Great Britain (2)
- Greece (2)
- Hungary (3)
- Italy (3)
- Japan (2)
- Kazakhstan (1)
- Malaysia (1)
- Netherlands (2)
- New Zealand (1)
- Poland (1)
- Portugal (1)
- Russia (2)
- Slovakia (1)
- Slovenia (1)
- South Africa (2)
- Spain (1)
- Tunisia (1)
- United States (3)
- Venezuela (2)

== Medal summary ==
=== Medal table ===
* Host nation (Brazil)

Rank	Nation	Gold	Silver	Bronze	Total
1	Netherlands	2	0	0	2
2	Greece	0	1	0	1
2	Italy	0	1	0	1
4	Brazil*	0	0	1	1
4	France	0	0	1	1
Totals (5 entries)		2	2	2	6

=== Men's events ===
Games	Gold		Silver		Bronze	
10 km open water	Ferry Weertman; Netherlands	1:52:59.8	Spyridon Gianniotis; Greece	1:53:00.5	Marc-Antoine Olivier; France	1:53:02.0

=== Women's events ===
Games	Gold		Silver		Bronze	
10 km open water	Sharon van Rouwendaal; Netherlands	1:56:32.1	Rachele Bruni; Italy	1:56:49.5	Poliana Okimoto; Brazil	1:56:51.4
