= Marathon swimming at the 2020 Summer Olympics =

Marathon swimming at the Games of the XXXII Olympiad
- Venue: Odaiba Marine Park
- Dates: 4–5 August 2021
- No. of events: 2
- Competitors: 51 from 31 nations

The marathon swimming competitions at the 2020 Summer Olympics in Tokyo were due to take place for 5-6 August 2020 at the Olympic Aquatics Centre. Due to the COVID-19 pandemic, the games were postponed to 2021. However, their official name remained 2020 Summer Olympics with marathon swimming set for 4–5 August 2021.

== Events ==
Marathon swimming featured two events (1 for each gender), two 10 km open-water marathons.

=== Schedule ===
All times are Japan Standard Time (UTC+9)

Event	Date	Time	Round
Women's 10 kilometre	4 August 2021	6:30	Final
Men's 10 kilometre	5 August 2021	6:30	Final

== Qualification ==
The men's and women's 10 km races featured 25 swimmers:

- 10: the top-10 finishers in the 10 km races at the 2019 World Championships
- 9: the top-9 finishers at the 2020 Olympic Marathon Swim Qualifier
- 5: one representative from each FINA continent (Africa, the Americas, Asia, Europe, and Oceania).
- 1: from the host nation (Japan) if not qualified by other means. If Japan already contained a qualifier in the race, this spot had been allocated back into the general pool from the 2020 Olympic qualifier race.

=== Timeline ===
Event	Date	Venue
2019 World Aquatics Championships	July 12–28, 2019	(South Korea) Gwangju
2021 FINA Olympic Marathon Swim Qualifier	June 19–20, 2021	(Portugal) Setúbal

=== Men's 10 km marathon ===
Qualification event	No. of athletes	Qualified athletes
2019 World Championships	10	Florian Wellbrock (GER); Marc-Antoine Olivier (FRA); Rob Muffels (GER); Kristóf Rasovszky (HUN); Jordan Wilimovsky (USA); Gregorio Paltrinieri (ITA); Ferry Weertman (NED); Alberto Martínez (ESP); Mario Sanzullo (ITA); David Aubry (FRA)
2020 Olympic Marathon Swim Qualifier	11	Hector Pardoe (GBR); Athanasios Kynigakis (GRE); Matan Roditi (ISR); Kai Edwards (AUS); Taishin Minamide (JPN); Tiago Campos (POR); Kirill Abrosimov (ROC); David Farinango (ECU); Oussama Mellouli (TUN); Michael McGlynn (RSA)° Daniel Delgadillo (MEX)^
Continental Qualifier	4	Matej Kozubek (CZE); Hau-Li Fan (CAN); Phillip Seidler (NAM); William Yan Thorley (HKG)
Host country	0	—
Total	25	

° Unused host quota place
^ Unused continental quota place

- No eligible athlete from Oceania competed in the men's race at the 2020 Olympic Marathon Swim Qualifier, which meant the top 10 qualified.

=== Women's 10 km marathon ===
Qualification event	No. of athletes	Qualified athletes
2019 World Championships	10	Xin Xin (CHN); Haley Anderson (USA); Rachele Bruni (ITA); Lara Grangeon (FRA); Ana Marcela Cunha (BRA); Ashley Twichell (USA); Kareena Lee (AUS); Finnia Wunram (GER); Leonie Beck (GER); Sharon van Rouwendaal (NED)
2020 Olympic Marathon Swim Qualifier	10	Anna Olasz (HUN); Paula Ruiz (ESP); Kate Sanderson (CAN); Alice Dearing (GBR); Angélica André (POR); Cecilia Biagioli (ARG); Anastasiya Kirpichnikova (ROC); Samantha Arévalo (ECU); Špela Perše (SLO); Michelle Weber (RSA)^
Continental Qualifier	4	Souad Cherouati (ALG); Paola Pérez (VEN); Krystyna Panchishko (UKR); Chantal Liew (SGP)
Host country	1	Yumi Kida (JPN)
Total	25	

^ Unused continental quota place

- No eligible athlete from Oceania competed in the women's race at the 2020 Olympic Marathon Swim Qualifier, which meant the top 10 qualified.

== Medal summary ==
=== Medal table ===
Rank	NOC	Gold	Silver	Bronze	Total
1	Brazil	1	0	0	1
1	Germany	1	0	0	1
3	Hungary	0	1	0	1
3	Netherlands	0	1	0	1
5	Australia	0	0	1	1
5	Italy	0	0	1	1
Totals (6 entries)		2	2	2	6

=== Men's event ===
Games	Gold		Silver		Bronze	
10 km open water	Florian Wellbrock; Germany	1:48:33.7	Kristóf Rasovszky; Hungary	1:48:59.0	Gregorio Paltrinieri; Italy	1:49:01.1

=== Women's event ===
Games	Gold		Silver		Bronze	
10 km open water	Ana Marcela Cunha; Brazil	1:59:30.8	Sharon van Rouwendaal; Netherlands	1:59:31.7	Kareena Lee; Australia	1:59:32.5
