= Marathon swimming at the 2012 Summer Olympics =

Coordinates: 51.5402°N 0.0106°W

Marathon swimming at the Games of the XXX Olympiad
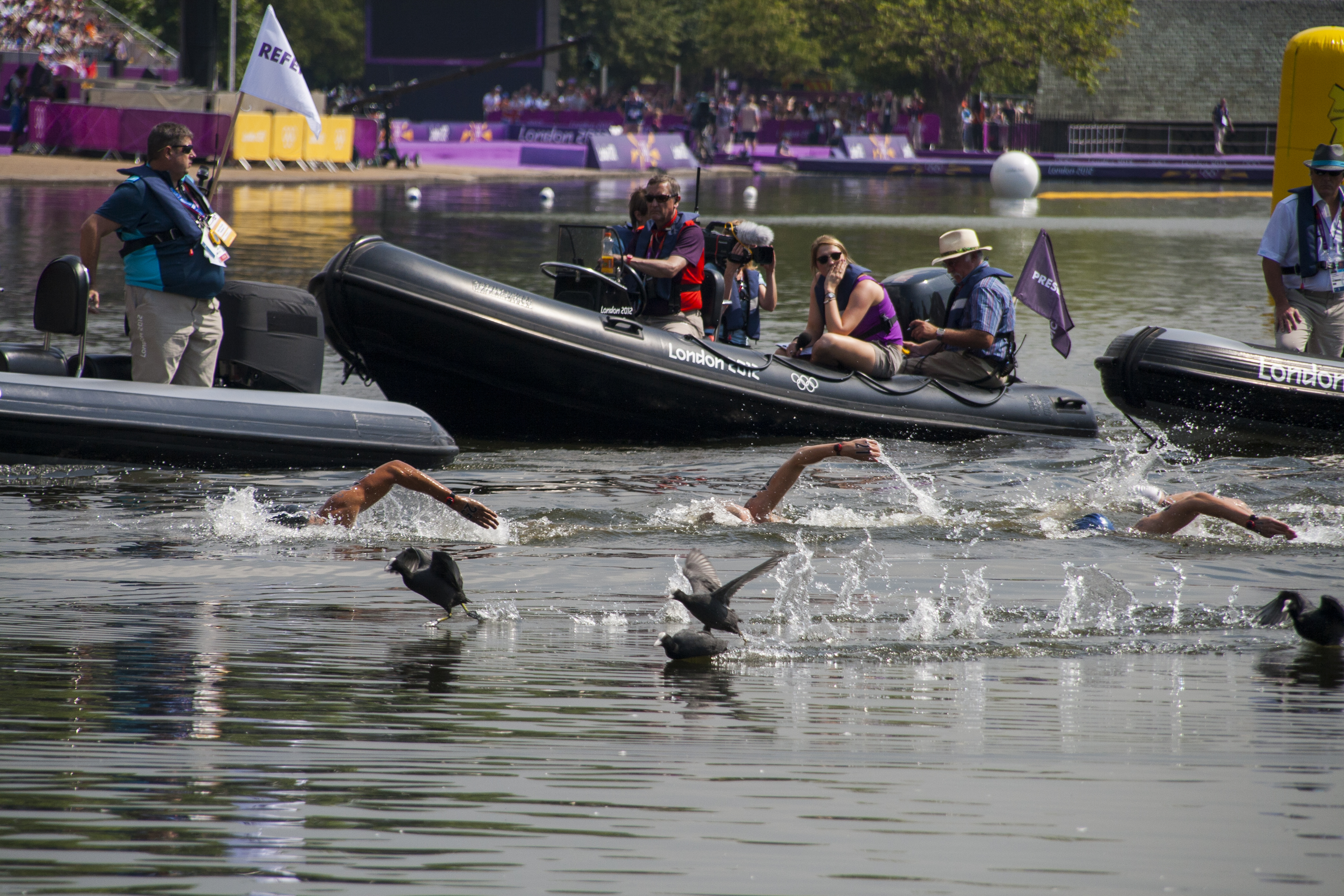
- Venue: Hyde Park
- Dates: 9–10 August 2012
- Competitors: 50 from 33 nations

Marathon swimming took place on 9 and 10 August at the 2012 Summer Olympics.

== Event schedule ==
Marathon swimming featured 2 events (1 male, 1 female). These were two 10 km open-water marathons in Hyde Park's Serpentine Lake. Both events started at 12:00, with the women's event taking place on 9 August and the men's event on 10 August.

== Qualification ==
FINA By-Law BL 9.3.7.5.3 lays out the qualification procedures for the marathon swimming competitions at the Olympics. Each country is allowed to enter up to two swimmers per individual event (provided they qualify).

The men's and women's 10 km races at the 2012 Olympics each featured 25 swimmers:

- 10: the top-10 finishers in the 10 km races at the 2011 World Championships
- 9: the top-9 finishers at the 2012 Olympic Marathon Swim Qualifier (8–9 June 2012 in Setúbal, Portugal).
- 5: one representative from each FINA continent (Africa, Americas, Asia, Europe and Oceania). (These were selected based on the finishes at the qualifying race in Setúbal.)
- 1: from the host nation (Great Britain) if not qualified by other means. If Great Britain already had a qualifier in the race, this spot was allocated back into the general pool from the 2012 qualifying race.

== Participating nations ==
- Argentina (1)
- Australia (2)
- Belgium (1)
- Brazil (1)
- Bulgaria (1)
- Canada (2)
- China (1)
- Croatia (1)
- Czech Republic (1)
- Ecuador (1)
- Egypt (1)
- France (2)
- Germany (3)
- Great Britain (2)
- Greece (2)
- Guam (1)
- Hong Kong (1)
- Hungary (2)
- Italy (2)
- Japan (2)
- Kazakhstan (1)
- Malaysia (1)
- Mexico (1)
- Poland (1)
- Portugal (1)
- Russia (3)
- South Africa (2)
- Spain (2)
- Switzerland (1)
- Tunisia (1)
- Ukraine (2)
- United States (2)
- Venezuela (2)

== Medal table ==
Rank	Nation	Gold	Silver	Bronze	Total
1	Hungary	1	0	0	1
1	Tunisia	1	0	0	1
3	Germany	0	1	0	1
3	United States	0	1	0	1
5	Canada	0	0	1	1
5	Italy	0	0	1	1
Totals (6 entries)		2	2	2	6

== Results ==
=== Men's event ===
Games	Gold		Silver		Bronze	
10 km open water	Oussama Mellouli; Tunisia	1:49:55.1	Thomas Lurz; Germany	1:49:58.5	Richard Weinberger; Canada	1:50:00.3
AF African Record | AM Americas Record | SA South American Record | AS Asian Record | ER European Record | OC Oceanian Record | OR Olympic Record | WJR World Junior Record | WR World Record; NR National Record (any World Record is necessarily also an Olympic, area, and national record. Area records (for continental regions) are also national records)

=== Women's event ===
Games	Gold		Silver		Bronze	
10 km open water	Éva Risztov; Hungary	1:57:38.2	Haley Anderson; United States	1:57:38.6	Martina Grimaldi; Italy	1:57:41.8
AF African Record | AM Americas Record | SA South American Record | AS Asian Record | ER European Record | OC Oceanian Record | OR Olympic Record | WJR World Junior Record | WR World Record; NR National Record (any World Record is necessarily also an Olympic, area, and national record. Area records (for continental regions) are also national records)
