= 2012 Summer Olympics =

Multi-sport event in London, England

Games of the XXX Olympiad
- The basic shape of the logo; other colour variants are shown below
- Location: London, United Kingdom
- Motto: Inspire a Generation
- Nations: 204+2 (including 2 IOA teams)
- Athletes: 10,518 (5,863 men, 4,655 women)
- Events: 302 in 26 sports (40 disciplines)
- Opening: 27 July 2012
- Closing: 12 August 2012
- Opened by: Queen Elizabeth II
- Closed by: IOC President Jacques Rogge
- Cauldron: Callum Airlie; Jordan Duckitt; Desirèe Henry; Katie Kirk; Cameron MacRitchie; Aidan Reynolds; Adelle Tracey; Austin Playfoot (relight)
- Stadium: Olympic Stadium

The 2012 Summer Olympics, officially the Games of the XXX Olympiad (Note: The IOC numbers the Olympiads using Roman numerals.) and also known as London 2012, were an international multi-sport event held from 27 July to 12 August 2012 in London, England. Some events were held at venues elsewhere in the United Kingdom. There were 10,518 athletes from 206 National Olympic Committees (NOCs) who participated in the 2012 Olympics.

Following a bid headed by the former Olympic champion Sebastian Coe and the mayor of London, Ken Livingstone, London was selected as the host city at the 117th IOC Session in Singapore on 6 July 2005, defeating bids from Moscow, New York City, Madrid and Paris. London became the first city to host the modern Olympics three times, (Note: Athens has also hosted three IOC-organised events, in 1896, 2004 and the Intercalated Games in 1906. However, the 1906 Games are no longer officially recognised by the IOC, as they do not fit with the quadrennial pattern of the modern Olympics.) having previously hosted the Summer Games in 1908 and 1948. Construction for the Games involved considerable redevelopment, with an emphasis on sustainability. The main focus was a new 200-hectare (490-acre) Olympic Park, constructed on a former industrial site in Stratford, East London. The Games also used venues that already existed before the bid.

The United States topped the medal table, winning the most gold medals (48) and the highest number of medals overall (105). China finished second with a total of 91 medals (38 gold) and Great Britain came third with 65 medals overall (29 gold). Michael Phelps of the United States became the most decorated Olympic athlete of all time, winning his 22nd medal. Saudi Arabia, Qatar and Brunei entered female athletes for the first time, meaning that every currently eligible country has now sent a female competitor to at least one Olympic Games. Women's boxing was included for the first time, and the 2012 Games became the first at which every sport had female competitors.

The Games received considerable praise for their organisation, with the volunteers, the British military and public enthusiasm commended particularly highly. The Games were described as happy and glorious. (Note: Quoting the British national anthem.) The opening ceremony, directed by the Academy Award winner Danny Boyle, received widespread acclaim. These were the final Olympic Games under the IOC presidency of Belgian Jacques Rogge, who was succeeded by German Thomas Bach the next year.

== Bidding process ==
London was chosen over Birmingham to represent Great Britain's bid by the British Olympic Association. By 15 July 2003—the deadline for interested cities to submit bids to the International Olympic Committee (IOC)—nine cities had submitted bids to host the 2012 Summer Olympics: Havana, Istanbul, Leipzig, London, Madrid, Moscow, New York City, Paris and Rio de Janeiro. On 18 May 2004, as a result of a scored technical evaluation, the IOC reduced the number of cities to five: London, Madrid, Moscow, New York and Paris. All five submitted their candidate files by 19 November 2004 and were visited by the IOC inspection team during February and March 2005. The Paris bid suffered two setbacks during the IOC inspection visit: a number of strikes and demonstrations coinciding with the visits, and a report that a key member of the bid team, Guy Drut, would face charges over alleged corrupt party political finances.

Throughout the process, Paris was widely seen as the favourite, particularly as this was its third bid in recent years. London was initially seen as lagging behind Paris by a considerable margin. Its position began to improve after the appointment of Lord Coe as the new chair of the London Organising Committee of the Olympic and Paralympic Games (LOCOG) on 19 May 2004. In late August 2004, reports predicted a tie between London and Paris.

On 6 June 2005 the IOC released its evaluation reports for the five candidate cities. They did not contain any scores or rankings, but the report for Paris was considered the most positive. London was close behind, having closed most of the gap observed by the initial evaluation in 2004. New York and Madrid also received very positive evaluations. On 1 July 2005, when asked who would win, Jacques Rogge said, "I cannot predict it since I don't know how the IOC members will vote. But my gut feeling tells me that it will be very close. Perhaps it will come down to a difference of say ten votes, or maybe less."

On 6 July 2005 the final selection was announced at the 117th IOC Session in Singapore. Moscow was the first city to be eliminated, followed by New York and Madrid. The final two contenders were London and Paris. At the end of the fourth round of voting, London won the right to host the 2012 Games with 54 votes to 50. The celebrations in London were short-lived, being overshadowed by bombings on London's transport system less than 24 hours after the announcement.

Five years after the games, Paris would later be selected to host the 2024 Summer Olympics on 13 September 2017.

2012 host city election – ballot results
City	Country	Round			
City	Country	1	2	3	4
London	Great Britain	22	27	39	54
Paris	France	21	25	33	50
Madrid	Spain	20	32	31	—
New York City	United States	19	16	—	—
Moscow	Russia	15	—	—	—
Total ballots		97	100	103	104

== Development and preparations ==
The London Organising Committee of the Olympic Games (LOCOG) was created to oversee the staging of the Games, and held its first board meeting on 3 October 2005. The committee, chaired by Lord Coe, was in charge of implementing and staging the Games, while the Olympic Delivery Authority (ODA), established in April 2006, was in charge of construction of the venues and infrastructure.

The Government Olympic Executive (GOE), a unit within the Department for Culture, Media and Sport (DCMS), was the lead government body for coordinating the London 2012 Olympics. It focused on oversight of the Games, cross-programme management, and the London 2012 Olympic Legacy before and after the Games that would benefit London and the wider United Kingdom. The organisation was also responsible for the supervision of the £9.3 billion of public sector funding.

In August 2011 security concerns arose surrounding the hosting of the Olympic Games in London, following the 2011 England riots. Some countries expressed safety concerns, despite the IOC's assurance that the riots would not affect the Games. The IOC's Coordination Commission for the 2012 Games completed its tenth and final visit to London in March 2012. Its members concluded that "London is ready to host the world this summer".

=== Venues ===
Facilities of the 2012 Summer Olympics in the Greater London area. Navigate the map for other facilities.

The 2012 Olympic and Paralympic Games used a mixture of new venues, existing and historic facilities, and temporary facilities, some of them in well-known locations such as Hyde Park and Horse Guards Parade. After the Games, some of the new facilities would be reused in their Olympic form, while others were resized or relocated.

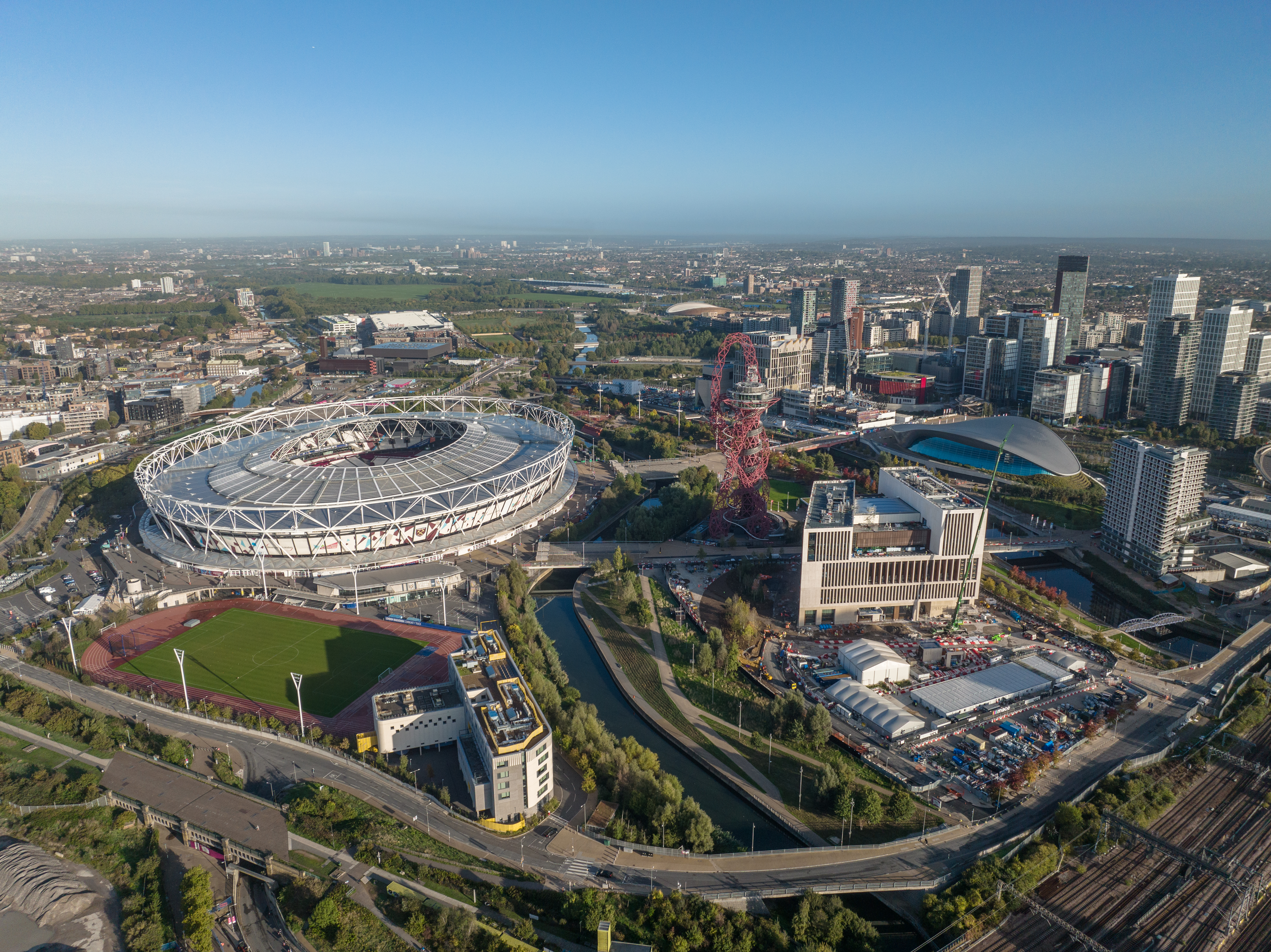
The Queen Elizabeth Olympic Park

The majority of venues were divided into three zones within Greater London: the Olympic Zone, the River Zone and the Central Zone. In addition there were a few venues that, by necessity, were outside the boundaries of Greater London, such as the Weymouth and Portland National Sailing Academy some 125 mi (201 km) southwest of London, which hosted the sailing events. The football tournament was staged at several grounds around the UK. Work began on the Park in December 2006, when a sports hall in Eton Manor was pulled down. The athletes' village in Portland was completed in September 2011.

In November 2004 the 200-hectare (500-acre) Olympic Park plans were revealed. The plans for the site were approved in September 2004 by Tower Hamlets, Newham, Hackney and Waltham Forest. The redevelopment of the area to build the Olympic Park required compulsory purchase orders of property. The London Development Agency was in dispute with London and Continental Railways about the orders in November 2005. By May 2006, 86% of the land had been bought as businesses fought eviction. Residents who opposed the eviction tried to find ways to stop it by setting up campaigns, but they had to leave as 94% of land was bought and the other 6% bought as a £9 billion regeneration project started.

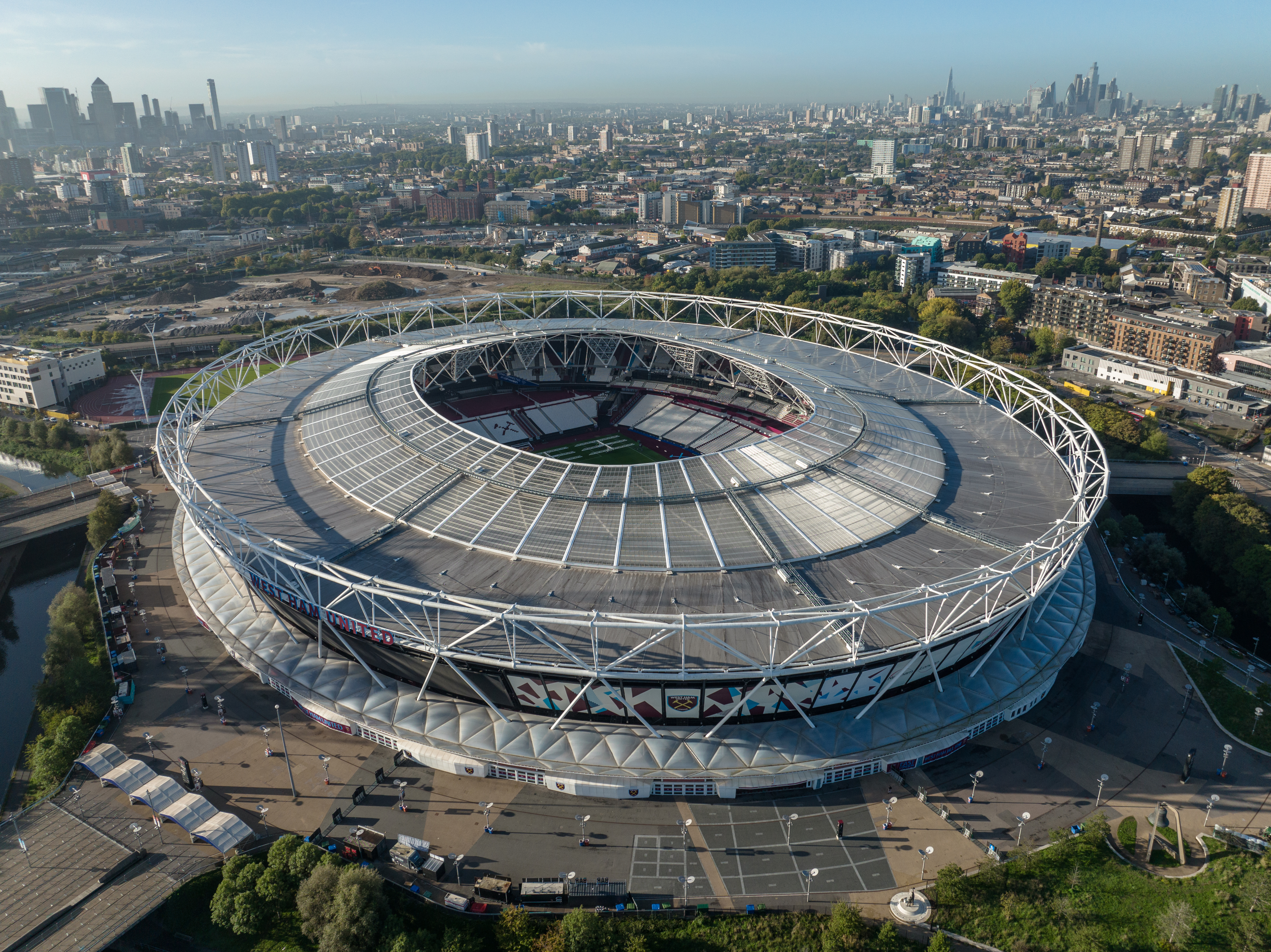
London Olympic Stadium

There were some issues with the original venues not being challenging enough or being financially unviable. Both the Olympic road races and the mountain bike event were initially considered to be too easy, so they were eventually scheduled on new locations. The Olympic marathon course, which was set to finish in the Olympic stadium, was moved to The Mall, since closing Tower Bridge was deemed to cause traffic problems in central London. North Greenwich Arena 2 was scrapped in a cost-cutting exercise, Wembley Arena being used for badminton and rhythmic gymnastics events instead.

Test events were held throughout 2011 and 2012, either through an existing championship such as 2012 Wimbledon Championships or as a specially created event held under the banner of London Prepares. Team GB House was the British Olympic Association's operational HQ up to and during the 2012 Olympic and Paralympic Games. Designed by architects Gebler Tooth on the top floor of an office building in Westfield Stratford City, it combined the team HQ, athletes' "Friends and Family" lounge, Press Centre, and VIP lounge.

=== Public transport ===
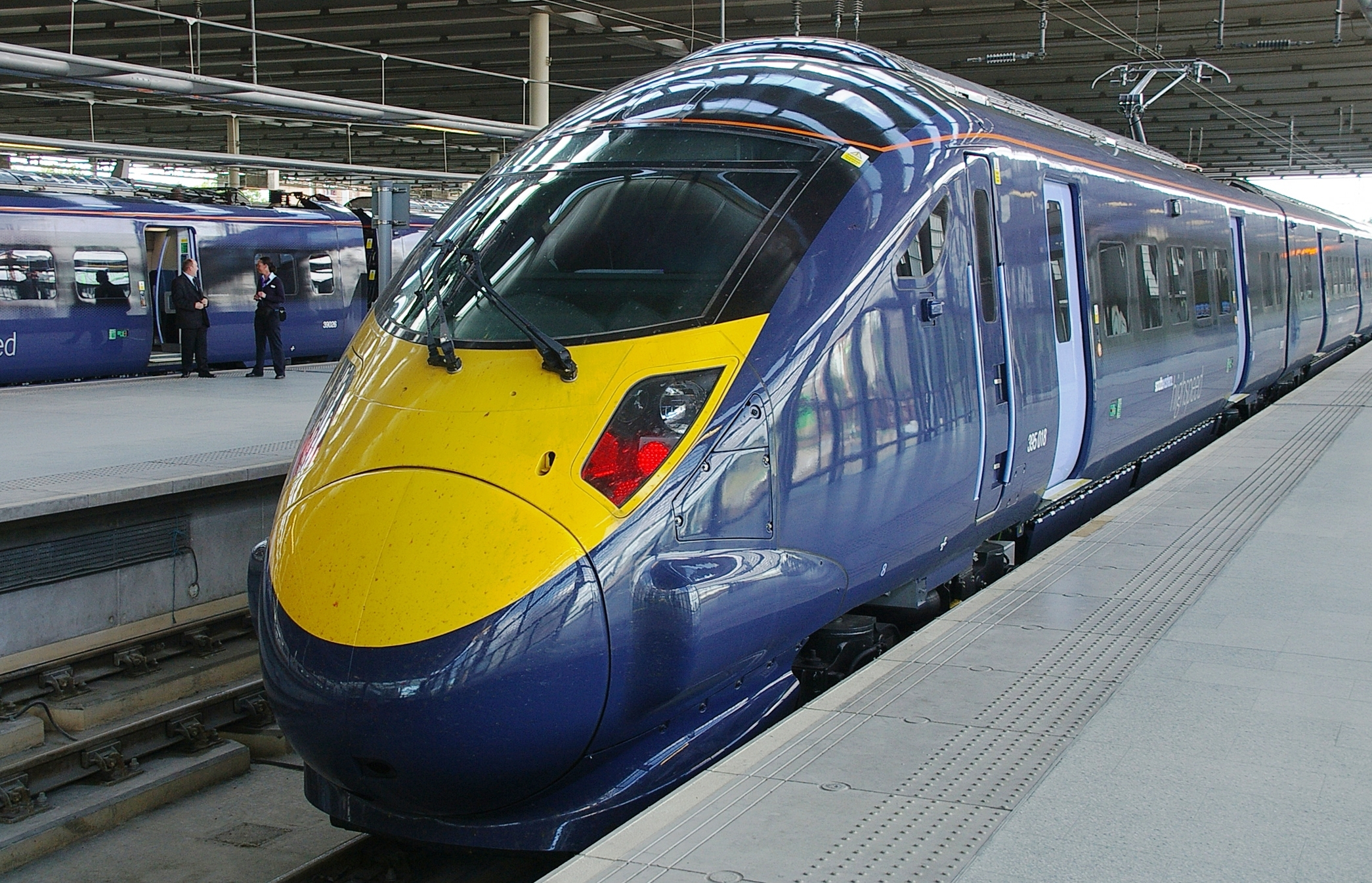
The Olympic Javelin high-speed service ran between St Pancras and Ebbsfleet, via Stratford.

IOC's initial evaluation felt that, if transport improvements were delivered in time for the Games, London would cope with the high demand. Transport for London (TfL) carried out numerous improvements in preparation for 2012, including the expansion of the London Overground's East London Line, upgrades to the Docklands Light Railway and the North London Line, and the introduction of a new "Javelin" high-speed rail service. According to Network Rail, an additional 4,000 train services operated during the Games, and train operators ran longer trains during the day. During the Games, Stratford International station was not served by any international services (just as it had not been before the Games), westbound trains did not stop at Hackney Wick railway station, and Pudding Mill Lane DLR station closed entirely during the Games.

TfL also built a £25 million cable car across the River Thames, called the Emirates Air Line, to link 2012 Olympics venues. It was inaugurated in June 2012 and crosses the Thames between Greenwich Peninsula and the Royal Docks, carrying up to 2,500 passengers an hour, cutting journey times between The O2 and the ExCeL exhibition centre and providing a crossing every 30 seconds.

The plan was to have 80% of athletes travel less than 20 minutes to their event and 93% of them within 30 minutes of their event. The Olympic Park would be served by ten separate railway lines with a combined capacity of 240,000 passengers per hour. In addition, LOCOG planned for 90% of the venues to be served by three or more types of public transport. Two park-and-ride sites off the M25 with a combined capacity of 12,000 cars were 25 minutes away from the Olympic Park. Another park-and-ride site was planned in Ebbsfleet with a capacity for 9,000 cars where spectators could board a 10-minute shuttle train service. To get spectators to Eton Dorney, four park-and-ride schemes were set up. These Park and Ride services were operated by First Games Transport.

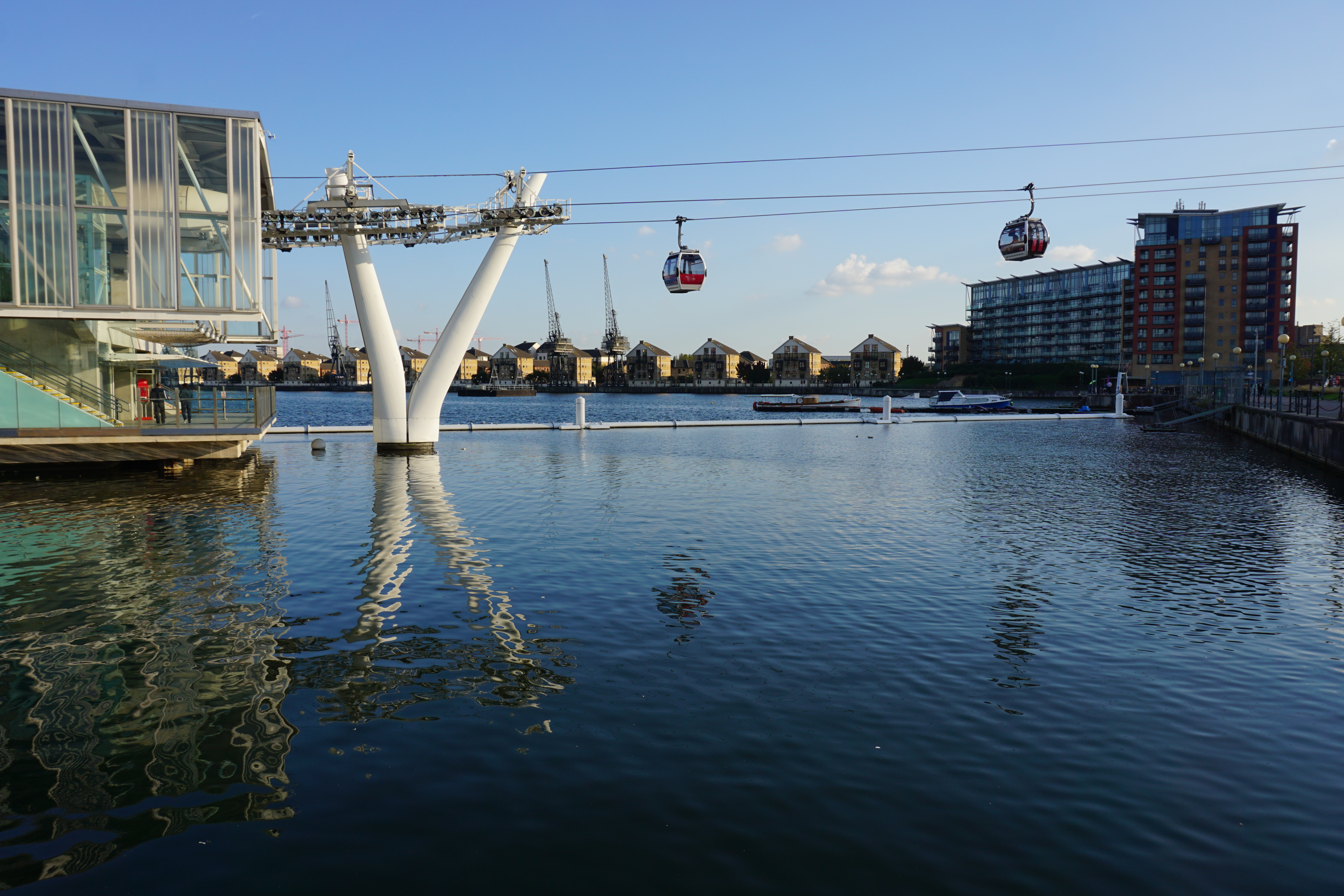
The Emirates Air Line crosses the River Thames between Greenwich Peninsula and the Royal Docks.

TfL defined a network of roads leading between venues as the Olympic Route Network; roads connecting all of the Olympic venues located within London. Many of these roads also contained special "Olympic lanes" marked with the Olympic rings—reserved for the use of Olympic athletes, officials, and other VIPs during the Games. Members of the public driving in an Olympic lane were subject to a fine of £130. Additionally, London buses would not include roads with Olympic lanes on their routes. Concerns were expressed at the logistics of spectators travelling to the events outside London. In particular, the sailing events at Portland had no direct motorway connections, and local roads are heavily congested by tourist traffic in the summer. However, a £77 million relief road connecting Weymouth to Dorchester was built and opened in 2011. Some £16 million was put aside for the rest of the active travel improvements.

TfL created a promotional campaign and website, Get Ahead of the Games, to help provide information related to transport during the Olympics and Paralympics. Through the campaign, TfL also encouraged the use of cycling as a mode of transport. A temporary terminal was created at Heathrow Airport to be used by 10,100 departing athletes after the Games. Up to 35% more bags than normal were expected on 13 August, which was predicted to be the busiest day in the airport's history, according to Nick Cole, head of Olympic and Paralympic planning at Heathrow.

=== Cost and financing ===
A study from Oxford University found that the sports-related costs of London 2012 amounted to US$15 billion, compared with $4.6 billion for Rio 2016, $40–44 billion for Beijing 2008, and $51 billion for Sochi 2014 (the most expensive Olympics in history). London 2012 went over budget by 76% in real terms, measured from bid to completion. The cost per athlete was $1.4 million. This does not include wider costs for urban and transport infrastructure, which often equal or exceed the sports-related costs.

The costs of staging the Games were separate from those for building the venues and infrastructure and redeveloping the land for the Olympic Park. While the Games were privately funded, the venues and infrastructure were largely financed using public money.

According to The Wall Street Journal, the original budget for the Games was increased to about £9.3 billion (US$15.28 billion) in 2007. The revised figures were announced to the House of Commons on 15 March 2007 by Tessa Jowell. Along with East End regeneration costs, the breakdown was:

- Building the venues and infrastructure – £5.3 billion
- Elite sport and Paralympic funding – £400 million
- Security and policing – £600 million
- Regeneration of the Lower Lea Valley – £1.7 billion
- Contingency fund – £2.7 billion

=== Volunteers ===
Unpaid volunteers known as Games Makers performed a variety of tasks before and during the Games. A target of 70,000 volunteers was set as early as 2004. When recruitment took place in 2010, more than 240,000 applications were received. Sebastian Coe said in February 2012, "Our Games Makers will contribute a total of around eight million volunteer hours during the Games and the Games simply wouldn't happen without them". The volunteers wore clothing that included purple and red polo shirts and jackets, beige trousers, grey socks and grey-and-white trainers, which they collected from the Uniform Distribution and Accreditation Centre. Volunteers also wore photo accreditation badges that were also worn by officials, athletes, family members and media, which gained them access to specific venues and buildings around the site.

=== Ticketing ===
Organisers estimated that some 8 million tickets would be available for the Olympic Games, and 1.5 million tickets for the Paralympic Games. LOCOG aimed to raise £375–£400 million in ticket sales. There were also free events such as marathon, triathlon and road cycling, although, for the first time in Olympic history, the sailing events were ticketed. Eventually, more than 7,000,000 tickets were sold. Following IOC rules, people applied for tickets from the NOC of their country of residence. European Union residents were able to apply for tickets in any EU country.

In Great Britain, ticket prices ranged from £20 for many events to £2,012 for the most expensive seats at the opening ceremony. Some free tickets were given to military personnel as part of the Tickets For Troops scheme, as well as to survivors and families of those who died during the 7 July 2005 London bombings. Initially, people were able to apply for tickets via a website from 15 March until 26 April 2011. There was a huge demand for tickets, with a demand of more than three times the number of tickets available. On 11 May 2012 a round of nearly one million "second chance" tickets went on sale over a 10-day period between 23 June and 3 July 2011. About 1.7 million tickets were available for football and 600,000 for other sports, including archery, field hockey, football, judo, boxing and volleyball. Ten sports had sold out by 8 am of the first day.

=== Countdown ===
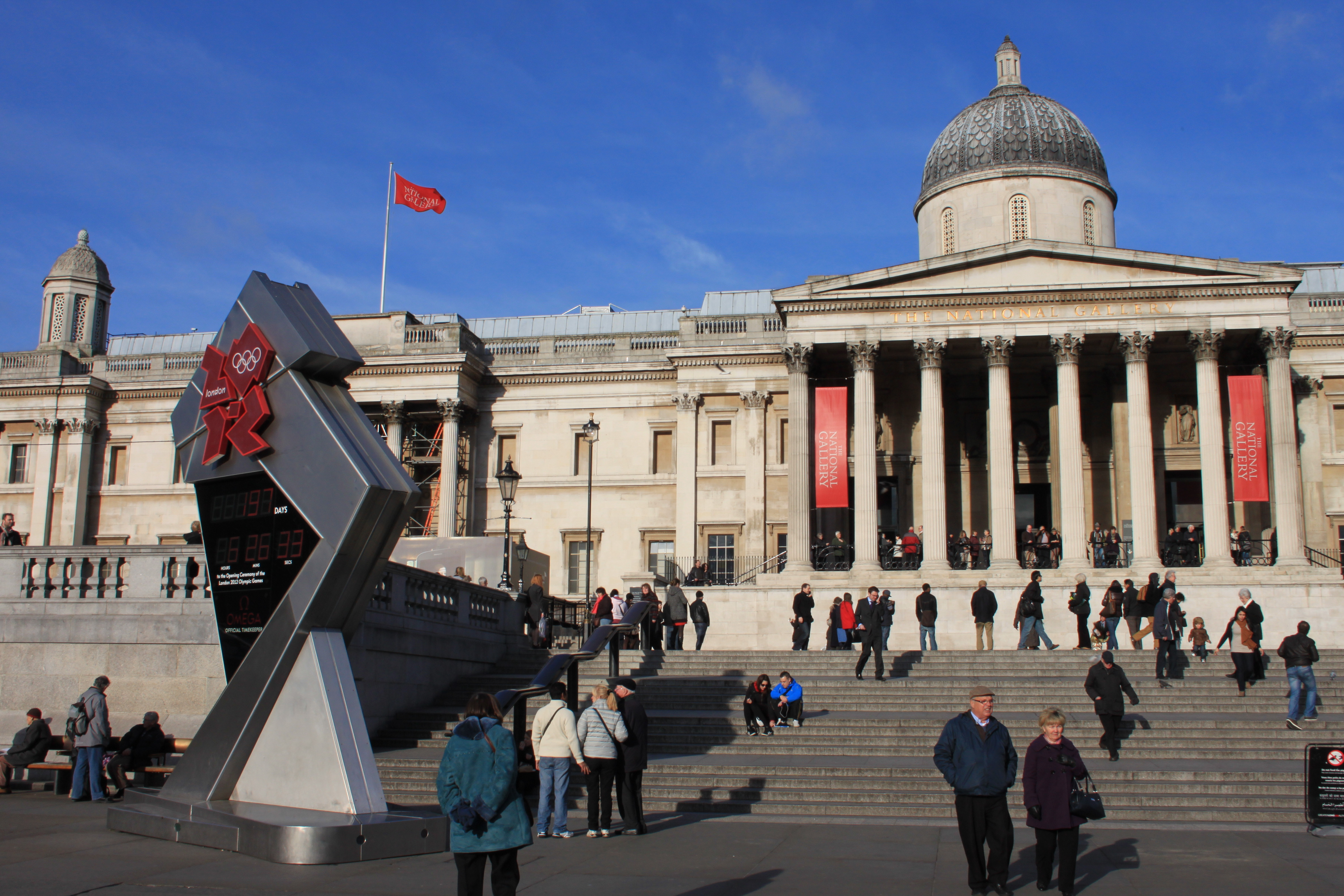
The Countdown Clock in Trafalgar Square

During the closing ceremony of the 2008 Olympics, the Olympic Flag was formally handed over from the Mayor of Beijing to the Mayor of London. This was followed by a section highlighting London, One month later, the Olympic and Paralympic flags were raised outside the London City Hall.

A countdown clock in Trafalgar Square was unveiled, 500 days before the Games. It was a two-sided clock with the Paralympic countdown on the other side. The countdown to the start of the Olympics began with a ceremony for the lighting of the Olympic flame in Olympia, Greece.

=== Security ===
The police led the security operation (named Operation Olympics by the Ministry of Defence), with 10,000 officers available, supported by 13,500 members of the British Armed Forces. Naval and air assets were deployed as part of the security operation, including ships situated in the Thames, Typhoon fighter jets and surface-to-air missiles; it was the biggest security operation Britain had faced in decades. The cost of security increased from £282 million to £553 million, and the figure of 13,500 armed forces personnel was greater than the number deployed at the time in Afghanistan. The Metropolitan Police and the Royal Marines carried out security exercises in preparation for the Olympics on 19 January 2012, with 50 marine police officers in rigid inflatables and fast response boats, joined by up to 100 military personnel and a Royal Navy Lynx helicopter.

The Ministry of Defence distributed leaflets to residents of the Lexington building in Bow, announcing that a missile system was to be stationed on top of the water tower. This caused concern to some residents. The Ministry said it probably would use Starstreak missiles and that site evaluations had taken place, but that no final decision had taken place.

=== Medals ===
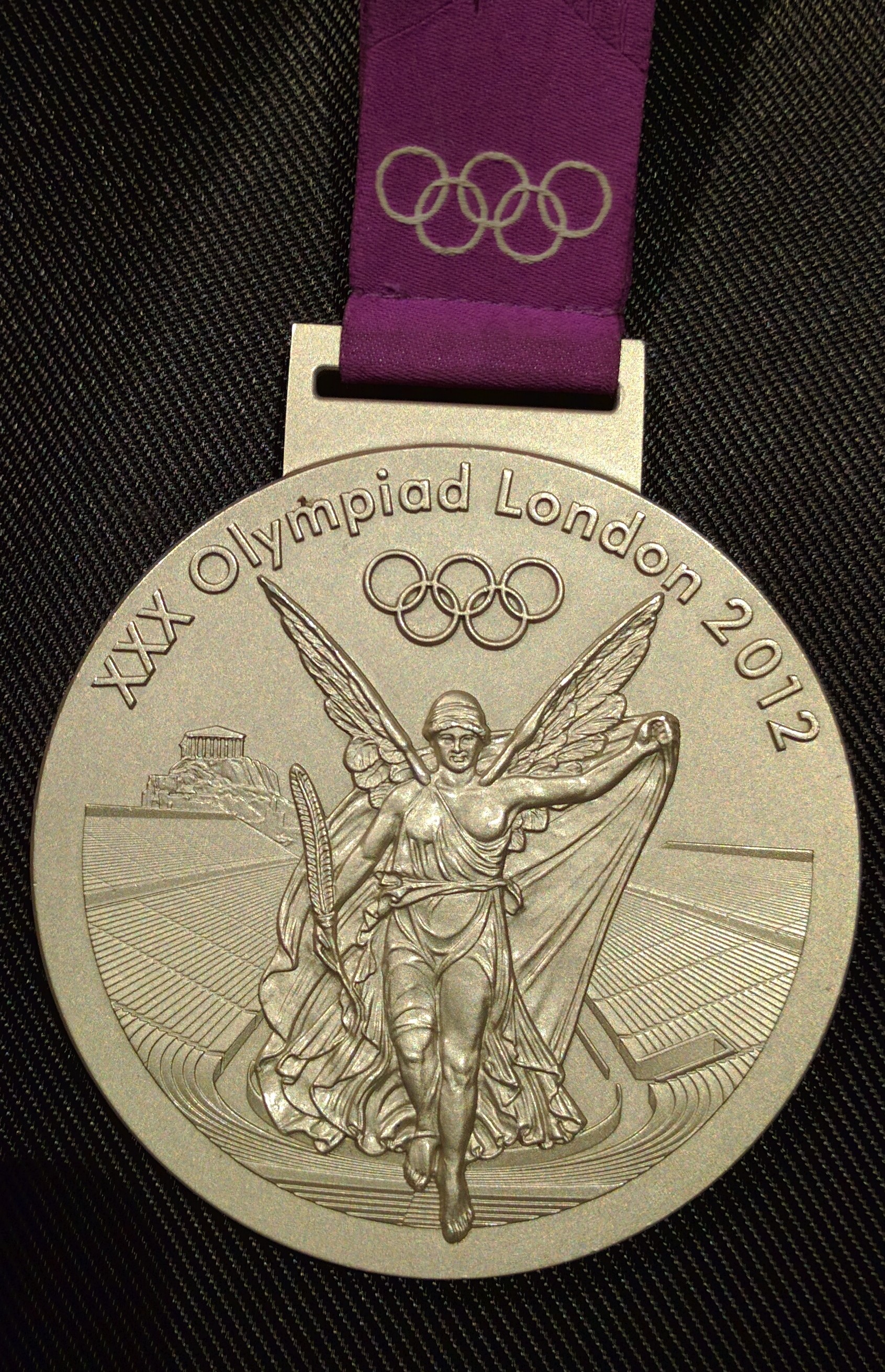
Front of the Silver Medal won by the USA.

Approximately 4,700 Olympic and Paralympic medals were produced by the Royal Mint at Llantrisant. They were designed by David Watkins (Olympics) and Lin Cheung (Paralympics). 99% of the gold, silver and copper was donated by Rio Tinto from a mine in Salt Lake County, Utah in the U.S. The remaining 1% came from a Mongolian mine. Each medal weighs 375–400 g (13.2–14.1 oz), has a diameter of 85 mm (3.3 in) and is 7 mm (0.28 in) thick, with the sport and discipline engraved on the rim. The obverse, as is traditional, features Nike, the Greek goddess of victory, stepping from the Panathinaiko Stadium that hosted the first modern Olympic Games in 1896, with Parthenon in the background; the reverse features the Games logo, the River Thames and a series of lines representing "the energy of athletes and a sense of pulling together". The medals were transferred to the Tower of London vaults on 2 July 2012 for storage.

Each gold medal is 92.5 percent silver and 1.34 percent gold, with the remainder copper. The silver medal is 92.5 percent silver, with the remainder copper. The bronze medal is made up of 97 percent copper, 2.5 percent zinc, and 0.5 per cent tin. The value of the materials in the gold medal was about £410 (US$644), the silver about £210 (US$330), and the bronze about £3 (US$4.71) as of 30 July 2012.

=== Podium ===
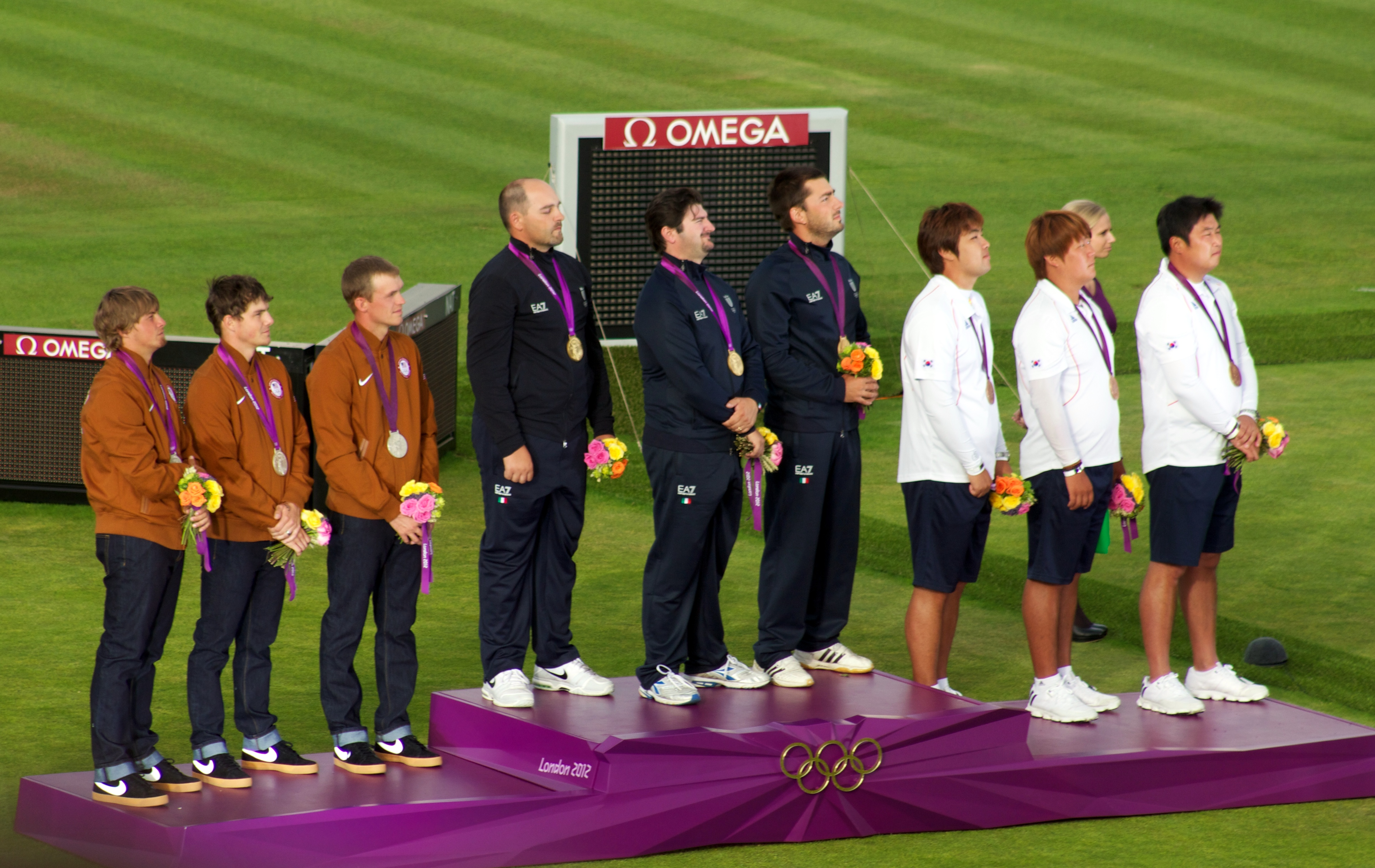
2012 Summer Olympics Archery podium

For the first time in Olympic history, the same podium design was used for both the Summer Olympics and the Summer Paralympics, reflecting the organizers’ intention to establish a unified visual identity across the two events. The royal purple podiums and ceremonial costumes used during the victory ceremonies of the 2012 Summer Olympics were designed by students from the Royal College of Art in collaboration with the London 2012 organizing committee. The students worked on the project for approximately eight months, developing designs intended to reflect the identity and atmosphere of the Games.

The podiums were inspired by the official emblem of the Games. The students used the angular design of the logo as the basis for the podium concept, extending its lines outward to create a three-dimensional structure intended to be viewed from multiple angles. To complement the visual identity adopted across the Olympic venues, the podiums were produced in a purple colour scheme, which organizers stated was intended to embody the energy and dynamism of the athletes competing at the Games. The podiums featured dynamic lines symbolizing the energy of both the Olympic Games and the athletes competing in them.

=== Torch relay ===
The Olympics torch relay ran from 19 May to 27 July 2012, before the Games. Plans for the relay were developed in 2010–11, with the torch-bearer selection process announced on 18 May 2011. The torch was designed by Edward Barber and Jay Osgerby. On 18 May 2012 the Olympic flame arrived at RNAS Culdrose in Cornwall from Greece on flight BA2012, operated by a British Airways Airbus A319 named "Firefly". The relay lasted 70 days, with 66 evening celebrations and six island visits, and involved some 8,000 people carrying the torch about 8,000 mi (12,875 km), starting from Land's End in Cornwall. The torch had three days outside the United Kingdom when it visited the Isle of Man on 2 June, Dublin in Ireland, on 6 June, and both Guernsey and Jersey on 15 July.

The relay focused on National Heritage Sites, locations with sporting significance, key sporting events, schools registered with the Get Set School Network, green spaces and biodiversity, Live Sites (city locations with large screens), and festivals and other events. Dumfries and Galloway was the only Region in the whole of the United Kingdom that had the Olympic Torch pass through it twice. A group of young athletes, nominated by retired Olympic athletes, ran the torch around the stadium. These torchbearers were Callum Airlie, Jordan Duckitt, Desiree Henry, Katie Kirk, Cameron MacRitchie, Aidan Reynolds and Adelle Tracey. Together the torchbearers each lit a petal that spread the fire to the 204 petals of the cauldron, representing the countries that participated in the Games. The cauldron was designed by Thomas Heatherwick.

=== Environmental policy ===
The Olympic Park was planned to incorporate 45 hectares of wildlife habitat, with a total of 525 bird boxes and 150 bat boxes. Local waterways and riverbanks were enhanced as part of the process. Renewable energy also featured at the Olympics. It was originally planned to provide 20% of the energy for the Olympic Park and Village from renewable technologies; however, only 9% of it was achieved. Proposals to meet the original target included large-scale on-site wind turbines and hydroelectric generators in the River Thames, but these plans were scrapped for safety reasons. The focus subsequently moved to installing solar panels on some buildings, and providing the opportunity to recover energy from waste. Where it could not be reused or recycled, food packaging for use at the Olympics—including fast-food wrappers, sandwich boxes and drink cartons—was made from compostable materials like starch and cellulose-based bioplastics. After use, many of these materials were suitable for anaerobic digestion (AD), allowing them to be made into renewable energy.

Post-Games, buildings like the Water Polo Arena were relocated elsewhere. Building parts like roofing covers and membranes of different temporary venues were recycled via VinyLoop. This allowed organisers to meet the standards of the Olympic Delivery Authority concerning environmental protection.

London 2012 inaugurated Olympic Games guidelines that included the recycling of PVC, which was used for temporary buildings such as the Basketball Arena and for the temporary parts of permanent venues such as the Olympic Stadium. In the Water Polo Arena, PVC roofing was made from recycled cushions to provide insulation. Through this recycling process, the Olympic Games PVC Policy was fulfilled; the policy states:

Where London 2012 procures PVC for temporary usage or where permanent usage is not assured, London 2012 is required to ensure that there is a take-back scheme that offers a closed-loop reuse system or mechanical recycling system for post-consumer waste.

According to Kirsten Henson, Materials Manager for the London 2012 Olympic Park: "The majority of temporary facilities created for the Olympic Games including the Aquatic centre temporary stands, basketball arena, Water Polo Arena, and the shooting facilities at the Royal Artillery Barracks, are essentially big tents. Basically, PVC stretched over lightweight steel frame. This design solution makes them efficient to install, reduces the need for any significant foundations and are, of course, reusable. We were challenged by the public around the use of PVC; but we considered it to be the right material for certain functions. We therefore challenged the PVC supply chain to have certain environmental performance criteria in place, including a take back and recycle scheme."

=== Cultural Olympiad ===
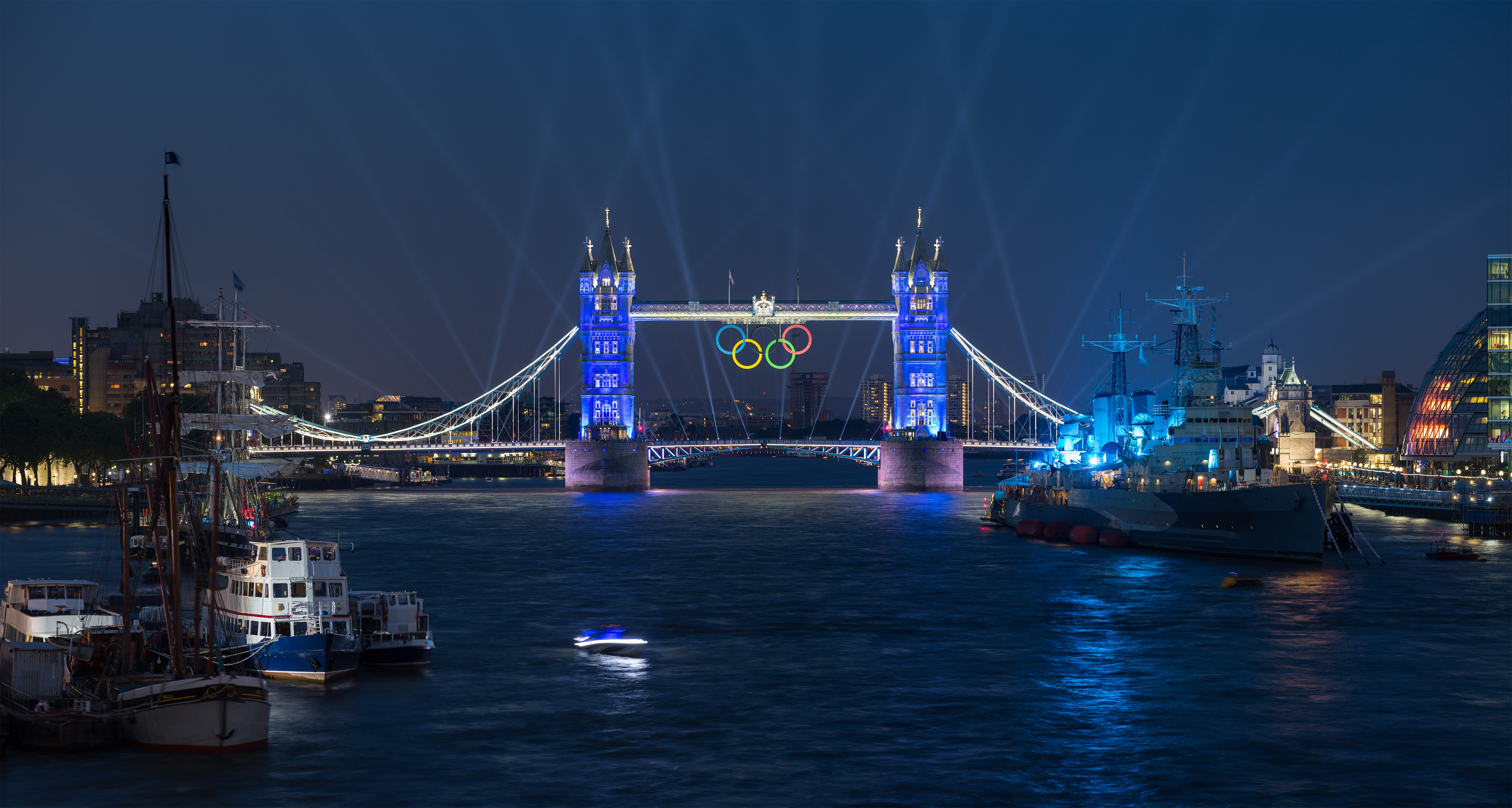
Tower Bridge was illuminated with the Olympic Rings in the week leading up to the opening ceremony.

The Olympic Charter, the set of rules and guidelines for the organisation of the Olympic Games and for governing the Olympic Movement, states that

LOCOG shall organise a programme of cultural events which must cover at least the entire period during which the Olympic Village is open.

The Cultural Olympiad comprised many programmes, with more than 500 events spread over four years across the whole of the United Kingdom, and culminating in the London 2012 Festival.

=== Opening ceremony ===
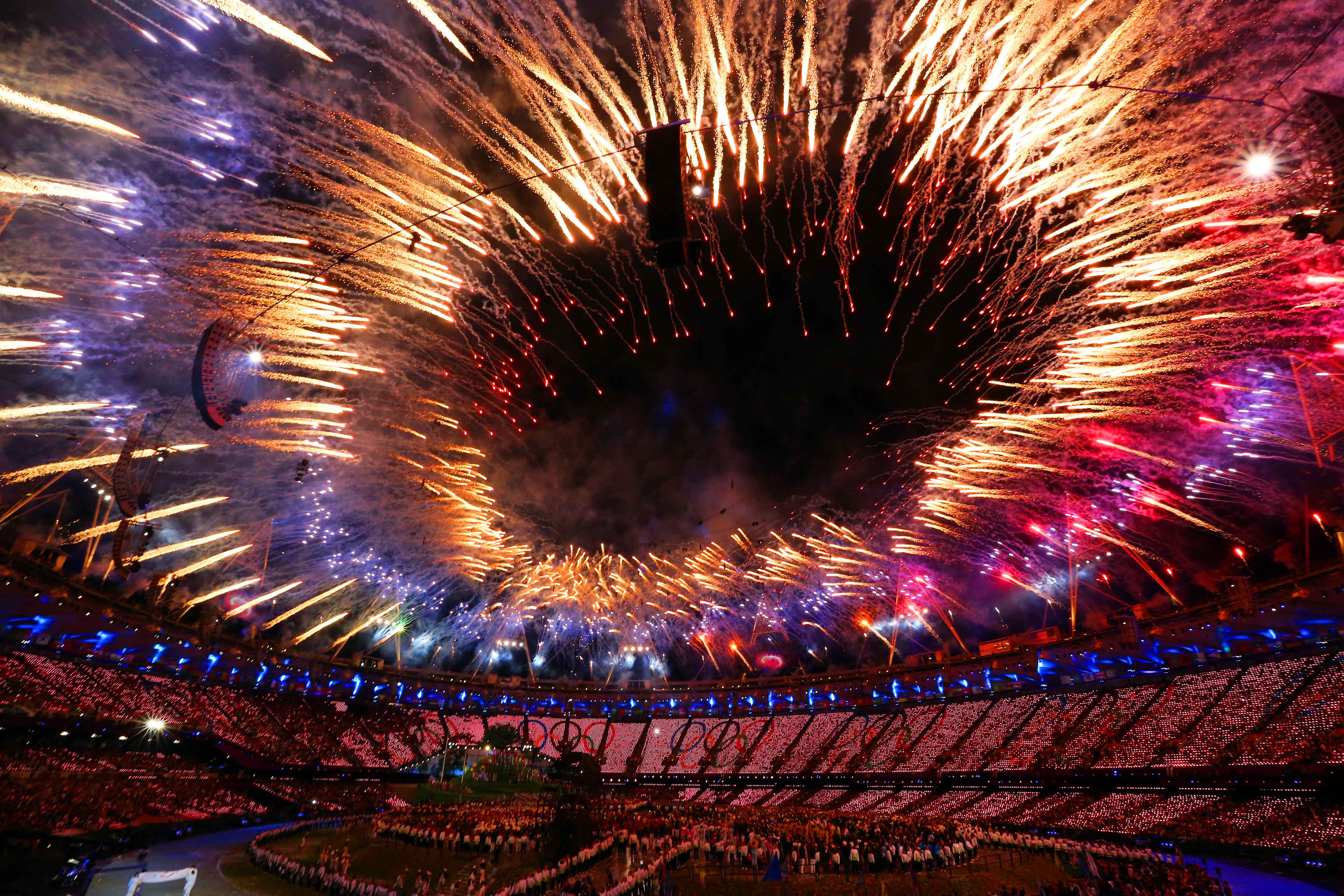
Fireworks at the opening ceremony

Titled "The Isles of Wonder", the opening ceremony began at 21:00 British Summer Time (UTC+1) on 27 July in the Olympic Stadium. The Academy Award–winning director Danny Boyle was artistic director and Rick Smith of Underworld was musical director. The opening ceremony was immediately seen as a tremendous success at home and worldwide, widely praised as a "masterpiece" and "a love letter to Britain". The principal sections of the artistic display represented Britain's Industrial Revolution, National Health Service, literary heritage, popular music and culture, and were noted for their vibrant storytelling and use of music.

The Games were officially opened by Queen Elizabeth II, accompanied by Prince Philip, Duke of Edinburgh. This was the second Olympic Games opened personally by the Queen, the first being in 1976 in Montreal, Canada. The ceremony featured a short comic film starring Daniel Craig as the secret agent James Bond and the Queen as herself. There was also a musical comedy item starring Rowan Atkinson as Mr. Bean playing along with the London Symphony Orchestra. These were widely ascribed to Britain's sense of humour.

Live musical performers included Frank Turner, Dame Evelyn Glennie, Mike Oldfield, Dizzee Rascal, Arctic Monkeys and Sir Paul McCartney who performed "Hey Jude" as the closing act. Broadcast live on BBC One, the ceremony attracted a peak viewing audience of over 27 million in the UK.

=== Closing ceremony ===
The closing ceremony was held on 12 August. It featured a flashback fiesta to British music with the Who closing the performance. The ceremony also included a handover of the Olympic flag by Boris Johnson, Mayor of London, to Eduardo Paes, Mayor of Rio de Janeiro, the host city of the 2016 Summer Olympics. In his closing address, Jacques Rogge described the Games as "happy and glorious".

== The Games ==
=== Participating National Olympic Committees ===
Number of participating athletes by country: 300+ / 100–299 / 30–99 / 10–29 / 4–9 / 1–3

Participating countries: Green = Had previously participated; Grey = Participating for first time; Yellow circle is host city (London)

Around 10,500 athletes from 206 National Olympic Committees (NOCs) took part, (85 countries acquired at least one medal: gold, silver or bronze) surpassing the 1948 Summer Olympics in London and the 2002 Commonwealth Games in Manchester as the largest multi-sport event ever to be held in the United Kingdom.

Three athletes from the Netherlands Antilles, which whose territory was dissolved in 2010 and lost its recognition during 123rd IOC session held during July 2011, and one athlete from South Sudan, which their NOC was recognised in 2015, participated as two independent athletes teams under the Olympic flag.

Participating National Olympic Committees
- Afghanistan (6)
- Albania (9)
- Algeria (38)
- American Samoa (4)
- Andorra (6)
- Angola (33)
- Antigua and Barbuda (4)
- Argentina (137)
- Armenia (24)
- Aruba (4)
- Australia (405)
- Austria (70)
- Azerbaijan (52)
- Bahamas (21)
- Bahrain (12)
- Bangladesh (5)
- Barbados (6)
- Belarus (160)
- Belgium (111)
- Belize (3)
- Benin (5)
- Bermuda (8)
- Bhutan (2)
- Bolivia (5)
- Bosnia and Herzegovina (6)
- Botswana (4)
- Brazil (248)
- British Virgin Islands (2)
- Brunei (3)
- Bulgaria (63)
- Burkina Faso (5)
- Burundi (6)
- Cambodia (6)
- Cameroon (32)
- Canada (273)
- Cape Verde (3)
- Cayman Islands (4)
- Central African Republic (6)
- Chad (2)
- Chile (35)
- China (376)
- Colombia (101)
- Comoros (3)
- Republic of the Congo (7)
- Democratic Republic of the Congo (4)
- Cook Islands (8)
- Costa Rica (11)
- Croatia (107)
- Cuba (109)
- Cyprus (13)
- Czech Republic (133)
- Denmark (114)
- Djibouti (4)
- Dominica (2)
- Dominican Republic (33)
- Ecuador (36)
- Egypt (109)
- El Salvador (10)
- Equatorial Guinea (2)
- Eritrea (12)
- Estonia (32)
- Ethiopia (33)
- Fiji (9)
- Finland (56)
- France (324)
- Gabon (21)
- The Gambia (2)
- Georgia (34)
- Germany (383)
- Ghana (7)
- Great Britain (530) (host)
- Greece (102)
- Grenada (8)
- Guam (8)
- Guatemala (19)
- Guinea (4)
- Guinea-Bissau (4)
- Guyana (6)
- Haiti (5)
- Honduras (25)
- Hong Kong (41)
- Hungary (152)
- Iceland (27)
- Independent Olympic Athletes (4)
- India (81)
- Indonesia (22)
- Iran (52)
- Iraq (8)
- Ireland (64)
- Israel (37) (Note: Originally, Israel had 38 participating athletes but swimmer Jonatan Kopelev, who had qualified for the Olympics in June 2012, had to withdraw from the team after having his appendix removed two weeks before the Games.)
- Italy (281)
- Ivory Coast (9)
- Jamaica (45)
- Japan (291)
- Jordan (9)
- Kazakhstan (113)
- Kenya (47)
- Kiribati (3)
- North Korea (52)
- South Korea (250)
- Kuwait (10)
- Kyrgyzstan (14)
- Laos (3)
- Latvia (45)
- Lebanon (10)
- Lesotho (4)
- Liberia (3)
- Libya (4)
- Liechtenstein (3)
- Lithuania (62)
- Luxembourg (9)
- Macedonia (4)
- Madagascar (7)
- Malawi (3)
- Malaysia (29)
- Maldives (5)
- Mali (6)
- Malta (5)
- Marshall Islands (4)
- Mauritania (2)
- Mauritius (11)
- Mexico (99)
- Federated States of Micronesia (6)
- Moldova (20)
- Monaco (6)
- Mongolia (29)
- Montenegro (33)
- Morocco (63)
- Mozambique (6)
- Myanmar (6)
- Namibia (9)
- Nauru (2)
- Nepal (5)
- Netherlands (173)
- New Zealand (178)
- Nicaragua (6)
- Niger (6)
- Nigeria (49)
- Norway (61)
- Oman (3)
- Pakistan (21)
- Palau (5)
- Palestine (5)
- Panama (8)
- Papua New Guinea (8)
- Paraguay (8)
- Peru (16)
- Philippines (11)
- Poland (210)
- Portugal (76)
- Puerto Rico (25)
- Qatar (12)
- Romania (105)
- Russia (429)
- Rwanda (7)
- Saint Kitts and Nevis (4)
- Saint Lucia (4)
- Saint Vincent and the Grenadines (3)
- Samoa (8)
- San Marino (4)
- São Tomé and Príncipe (2)
- Saudi Arabia (19)
- Senegal (31)
- Serbia (116)
- Seychelles (6)
- Sierra Leone (2)
- Singapore (23)
- Slovakia (47)
- Slovenia (65)
- Solomon Islands (4)
- Somalia (2)
- South Africa (124)
- Spain (278)
- Sri Lanka (7)
- Sudan (6)
- Suriname (5)
- Swaziland (3)
- Sweden (133)
- Switzerland (98)
- Syria (10)
- Chinese Taipei (44)
- Tajikistan (16)
- Tanzania (6)
- Thailand (37)
- Timor-Leste (2)
- Togo (6)
- Tonga (3)
- Trinidad and Tobago (25)
- Tunisia (83)
- Turkey (112)
- Turkmenistan (10)
- Tuvalu (3)
- Uganda (15)
- Ukraine (230)
- United Arab Emirates (26)
- United States (530)
- Uruguay (27)
- Uzbekistan (53)
- Vanuatu (5)
- Venezuela (68)
- Vietnam (18)
- Virgin Islands (7)
- Yemen (4)
- Zambia (7)
- Zimbabwe (7)

==== Number of athletes by National Olympic Committee ====
10,518 athletes from 204 NOCs

IOC Letter Code	Country	Athletes
USA	United States	530
GBR	Great Britain	530
RUS	Russia	429
AUS	Australia	405
GER	Germany	383
CHN	China	376
FRA	France	324
JPN	Japan	291
ITA	Italy	281
ESP	Spain	278
CAN	Canada	273
KOR	South Korea	250
BRA	Brazil	248
UKR	Ukraine	230
POL	Poland	210
NZL	New Zealand	178
NED	Netherlands	173
BLR	Belarus	160
HUN	Hungary	152
ARG	Argentina	137
CZE	Czech Republic	133
SWE	Sweden	133
RSA	South Africa	124
SRB	Serbia	116
DEN	Denmark	114
KAZ	Kazakhstan	113
TUR	Turkey	112
BEL	Belgium	111
CUB	Cuba	109
EGY	Egypt	109
CRO	Croatia	107
ROU	Romania	105
GRE	Greece	102
COL	Colombia	101
MEX	Mexico	99
SUI	Switzerland	98
TUN	Tunisia	83
IND	India	81
POR	Portugal	76
AUT	Austria	70
VEN	Venezuela	68
SLO	Slovenia	65
IRL	Ireland	64
BUL	Bulgaria	63
MAR	Morocco	63
LTU	Lithuania	62
NOR	Norway	61
FIN	Finland	56
UZB	Uzbekistan	53
AZE	Azerbaijan	52
IRI	Iran	52
PRK	North Korea	52
NGR	Nigeria	49
KEN	Kenya	47
SVK	Slovakia	47
JAM	Jamaica	45
LAT	Latvia	45
TPE	Chinese Taipei	44
HKG	Hong Kong	41
ALG	Algeria	38
ISR	Israel	37
THA	Thailand	37
ECU	Ecuador	36
CHI	Chile	35
GEO	Georgia	34
ANG	Angola	33
DOM	Dominican Republic	33
ETH	Ethiopia	33
MNE	Montenegro	33
CMR	Cameroon	32
EST	Estonia	32
SEN	Senegal	31
MAS	Malaysia	29
MGL	Mongolia	29
ISL	Iceland	27
URU	Uruguay	27
UAE	United Arab Emirates	26
HON	Honduras	25
PUR	Puerto Rico	25
TRI	Trinidad and Tobago	25
ARM	Armenia	24
SIN	Singapore	23
INA	Indonesia	22
BAH	Bahamas	21
GAB	Gabon	21
PAK	Pakistan	21
MDA	Moldova	20
GUA	Guatemala	19
KSA	Saudi Arabia	19
VIE	Vietnam	18
PER	Peru	16
TJK	Tajikistan	16
UGA	Uganda	15
KGZ	Kyrgyzstan	14
CYP	Cyprus	13
BRN	Bahrain	12
ERI	Eritrea	12
QAT	Qatar	12
CRC	Costa Rica	11
MRI	Mauritius	11
PHI	Philippines	11
ESA	El Salvador	10
KUW	Kuwait	10
LIB	Lebanon	10
SYR	Syria	10
TKM	Turkmenistan	10
ALB	Albania	9
FIJ	Fiji	9
CIV	Ivory Coast	9
JOR	Jordan	9
LUX	Luxembourg	9
NAM	Namibia	9
BER	Bermuda	8
COK	Cook Islands	8
GRN	Grenada	8
GUM	Guam	8
IRQ	Iraq	8
PAN	Panama	8
PNG	Papua New Guinea	8
PAR	Paraguay	8
SAM	Samoa	8
CGO	Republic of the Congo	7
GHA	Ghana	7
ISV	Virgin Islands	7
MAD	Madagascar	7
RWA	Rwanda	7
SRI	Sri Lanka	7
ZAM	Zambia	7
ZIM	Zimbabwe	7
AFG	Afghanistan	6
AND	Andorra	6
BAR	Barbados	6
BIH	Bosnia and Herzegovina	6
BDI	Burundi	6
CAM	Cambodia	6
CAF	Central African Republic	6
FSM	Federated States of Micronesia	6
GUY	Guyana	6
MLI	Mali	6
MON	Monaco	6
MOZ	Mozambique	6
MYA	Myanmar	6
NCA	Nicaragua	6
NIG	Niger	6
SEY	Seychelles	6
SUD	Sudan	6
TAN	Tanzania	6
TOG	Togo	6
BAN	Bangladesh	5
BEN	Benin	5
BOL	Bolivia	5
BUR	Burkina Faso	5
HAI	Haiti	5
MDV	Maldives	5
MLT	Malta	5
NEP	Nepal	5
PLE	Palestine	5
PLW	Palau	5
SUR	Suriname	5
VAN	Vanuatu	5
ANT	Antigua and Barbuda	4
ASA	American Samoa	4
ARU	Aruba	4
BOT	Botswana	4
CAY	Cayman Islands	4
COD	Democratic Republic of the Congo	4
DJI	Djibouti	4
GUI	Guinea	4
GBS	Guinea-Bissau	4
IOA	Independent Olympic Athletes	4
LES	Lesotho	4
LBA	Libya	4
MKD	Macedonia	4
MHL	Marshall Islands	4
SKN	Saint Kitts and Nevis	4
LCA	Saint Lucia	4
SMR	San Marino	4
SOL	Solomon Islands	4
YEM	Yemen	4
BIZ	Belize	3
BRU	Brunei	3
CPV	Cape Verde	3
COM	Comoros	3
KIR	Kiribati	3
LAO	Laos	3
LBR	Liberia	3
LIE	Liechtenstein	3
MAW	Malawi	3
OMA	Oman	3
VIN	Saint Vincent and the Grenadines	3
SWZ	Swaziland	3
TGA	Tonga	3
TUV	Tuvalu	3
BHU	Bhutan	2
IVB	British Virgin Islands	2
CHA	Chad	2
DMA	Dominica	2
GEQ	Equatorial Guinea	2
GAM	The Gambia	2
MTN	Mauritania	2
NRU	Nauru	2
STP	São Tomé and Príncipe	2
SLE	Sierra Leone	2
SOM	Somalia	2
TLS	Timor-Leste	2

==== National houses ====
During the Games, some countries and continents had a "national house". These temporary meeting places for supporters, athletes and other followers were located throughout London.

Nation	Location	Name
African nations	Kensington Gardens	
Austria	Trinity House	
Belgium	Inner Temple	
Brazil	Somerset House	Casa Brasil
Canada	Canada House	
China	The Waldorf Hilton	
Croatia	Pelham Hotel, South Kensington	
Czech Republic	Business Design Centre, Islington	
Denmark	St Katharine Docks	
France	Old Billingsgate	Club France
Georgia	Chelsea College of Art and Design (45 Millbank)	
Germany	Museum of London Docklands	Deutsches Haus
Great Britain	Westfield Stratford City	
Ireland	The Big Chill House, Kings Cross	
Italy	Queen Elizabeth II Conference Centre	Casa Italia
Japan	Royal Aeronautical Society	
Jamaica	The O2	
Kenya	East Thames Community Centre, Stratford	
Korea	Royal Thames Yacht Club	
Monaco	Haymarket	
Netherlands	Alexandra Palace	Holland Heineken House
New Zealand	Granary Square, Kings Cross	Kiwi House
Nigeria	Theatre Royal Stratford East	
Poland	Polish Social and Cultural Centre	
Qatar	Institution of Engineering and Technology, Savoy Place	
Romania	30 Pavilion Road, Knightsbridge	
Russia	Perks Field, Kensington Palace	
Slovakia	Institute of Directors	
South Africa	Queen Elizabeth Hall	
South Pacific	St Katharine Docks	
Switzerland	Glazier's Hall	
Trinidad & Tobago	Tricycle Theatre	
United States	Royal College of Art	

=== Sports ===
The 2012 Summer Olympics featured 26 different sports encompassing 40 disciplines and 302 medal events. In the list below, the number of events in each discipline is noted in parentheses.

2012 Summer Olympics Sports Programme

- Aquatics
  - Diving (8)
  - Marathon swimming (2)
  - Swimming (32)
  - Synchronised swimming (2)
  - Water polo (2)
- Archery (4)
- Athletics (47)
- Badminton (5)
- Basketball (2)
- Boxing (13)
- Canoeing
  - Sprint (12)
  - Slalom (4)
- Cycling (competitors)
  - BMX (2)
  - Mountain biking (2)
  - Road (4)
  - Track (10)
- Equestrian
  - Dressage (2)
  - Eventing (2)
  - Jumping (2)
- Fencing (10)
- Field hockey (2)
- Football (2)
- Gymnastics
  - Artistic (14)
  - Rhythmic (2)
  - Trampoline (2)
- Handball (2)
- Judo (14)
- Modern pentathlon (2)
- Rowing (14)
- Sailing (10)
- Shooting (15)
- Table tennis (4)
- Taekwondo (8)
- Tennis (5)
- Triathlon (2)
- Volleyball
  - Volleyball (2)
  - Beach volleyball (2)
- Weightlifting (15)
- Wrestling
  - Freestyle (11)
  - Greco-Roman (7)

Women's boxing was included in the programme for the first time, and 36 women competed in three weight classes. There was a special dispensation for the shooting events, which would otherwise have been illegal under UK gun law. In tennis, mixed doubles returned to the Olympic programme for the first time since 1924.

London's bid featured the same 28 sports that had been included in other recent Summer Olympics, but the IOC voted to drop baseball and softball from the 2012 Games just two days after London had been selected as the host city. There was an appeal, but the IOC voted to uphold the decision, and the two sports were scheduled to be discontinued after their last appearance at the 2008 Olympics. The IOC then voted on whether to replace them; karate, squash, golf, roller sports and rugby sevens were considered. Karate and squash were the two final nominees, but neither received enough votes to reach the required two-thirds majority.

Although formal demonstration sports were eliminated after the 1992 Summer Olympics, special tournaments for non-Olympic sports can be run during the Games, such as the Wushu tournament at the 2008 Summer Olympics. There were attempts to run Twenty20 cricket and netball tournaments alongside the 2012 Games, but neither campaign was successful.

=== Calendar ===
The final official schedule was released on 15 February 2011.

All times and dates use British Summer Time (UTC+1)

OC	Opening ceremony	●	Event competitions	1	Gold medal events	CC	Closing ceremony

July/August 2012		July							August												Events
July/August 2012		25th Wed	26th Thu	27th Fri	28th Sat	29th Sun	30th Mon	31st Tue	1st Wed	2nd Thu	3rd Fri	4th Sat	5th Sun	6th Mon	7th Tue	8th Wed	9th Thu	10th Fri	11th Sat	12th Sun	Events
Ceremonies				OC																CC	—N/a
Aquatics	Diving					1	1	1	1		●	●	1	●	1	●	1	●	1		46
Aquatics	Marathon swimming																1	1			46
Aquatics	Swimming				4	4	4	4	4	4	4	4									46
Aquatics	Synchronized swimming												●	●	1		●	1			46
Aquatics	Water polo					●	●	●	●	●	●	●	●	●	●	●	1	●		1	46
Archery				●	1	1	●	●	●	1	1										4
Athletics											2	6	6	5	4	4	5	6	8	1	47
Badminton					●	●	●	●	●	●	1	2	2								5
Basketball					●	●	●	●	●	●	●	●	●	●	●	●	●	●	1	1	2
Boxing					●	●	●	●	●	●	●	●	●	●	●	●	3	●	5	5	13
Canoeing	Slalom					●	●	1	1	2											16
Canoeing	Sprint													●	●	4	4	●	4		16
Cycling	Road cycling				1	1			2												18
Cycling	Track cycling									2	2	1	1	1	3						18
Cycling	BMX															●	●	2			18
Cycling	Mountain biking																		1	1	18
Equestrian					●	●	●	2		●	●	●	●	1	1	1	1				6
Fencing					1	1	1	1	2	1	1	1	1								10
Field hockey						●	●	●	●	●	●	●	●	●	●	●	●	1	1		2
Football		●	●		●	●		●	●		●	●		●	●		1	●	1		2
Gymnastics	Artistic				●	●	1	1	1	1			3	3	4						18
Gymnastics	Rhythmic																●	●	1	1	18
Gymnastics	Trampolining										1	1									18
Handball					●	●	●	●	●	●	●	●	●	●	●	●	●	●	1	1	2
Judo					2	2	2	2	2	2	2										14
Modern pentathlon																			1	1	2
Rowing					●	●	●	●	3	3	4	4									14
Sailing						●	●	●	●	●	●	●	2	2	2	1		2	1		10
Shooting					2	2	1	1	1	1	2	2	1	2							15
Table tennis					●	●	●	●	1	1	●	●	●	●	1	1					4
Taekwondo																2	2	2	2		8
Tennis					●	●	●	●	●	●	●	2	3								5
Triathlon												1			1						2
Volleyball	Beach volleyball				●	●	●	●	●	●	●	●	●	●	●	1	1				4
Volleyball	Indoor volleyball				●	●	●	●	●	●	●	●	●	●	●	●	●	●	1	1	4
Weightlifting					1	2	2	2	2		2	1	1	1	1						15
Wrestling													2	3	2	2	2	2	3	2	18
Daily medal events					12	14	12	15	20	18	22	25	23	18	21	16	22	17	32	15	302
Cumulative total					12	26	38	53	73	91	113	138	161	179	200	216	238	255	287	302	302
July/August 2012		25th Wed	26th Thu	27th Fri	28th Sat	29th Sun	30th Mon	31st Tue	1st Wed	2nd Thu	3rd Fri	4th Sat	5th Sun	6th Mon	7th Tue	8th Wed	9th Thu	10th Fri	11th Sat	12th Sun	Total events
July/August 2012		July							August												Total events

=== Records ===
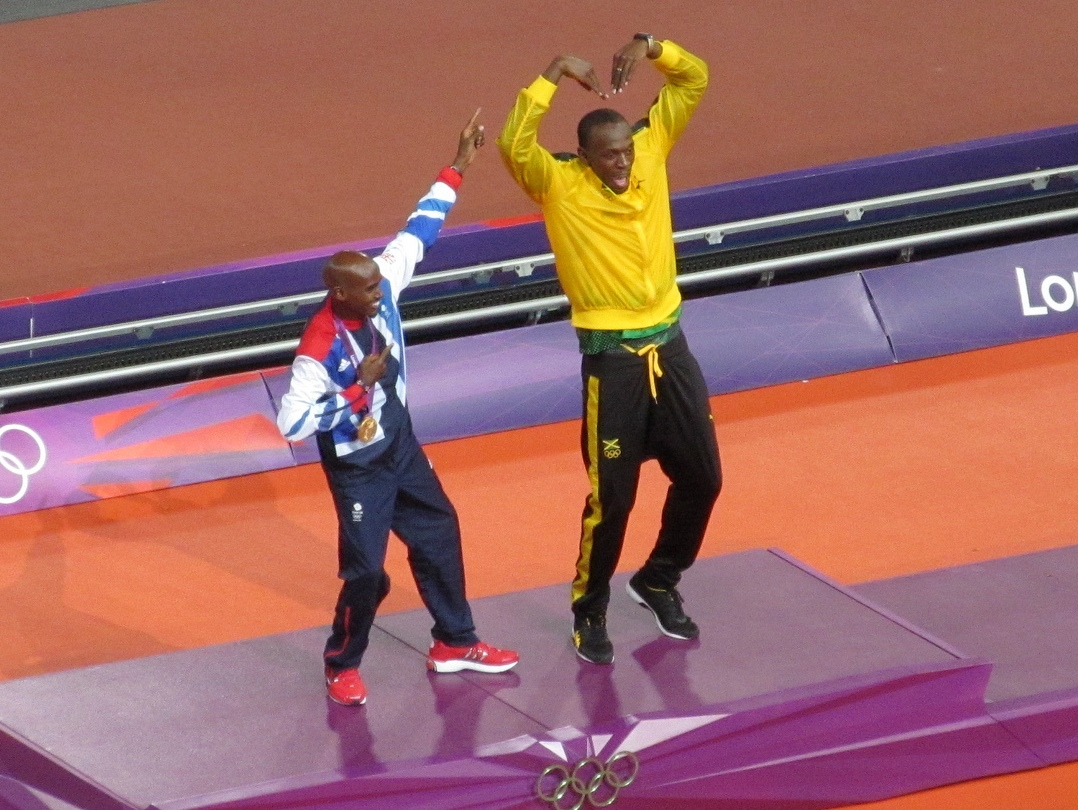
Mo Farah (left) with Usain Bolt (right), demonstrating one another's famous gestures (the "Lightning Bolt" and "Mobot")

These Olympic Games resulted in 32 world records in eight sports. The largest number of records were set in swimming, at eight. China, Great Britain and the United States set the most records, with five each.

== Medal table ==
A total of 85 National Olympic Committees (NOCs) won medals, 54 of those countries winning at least one gold medal. Seven NOCs won their first ever Olympic medal: Bahrain (gold), Botswana (silver), Cyprus (silver), Gabon (silver), Grenada (gold), Guatemala (silver), and Montenegro (silver). The United States finished at the top of the table, winning 48 gold medals and a total of 104 medals. China finished second with 38 gold medals and 91 medals overall, and hosts Great Britain came in third place, winning 29 gold medals and 65 medals overall in their best performance since London hosted its first Summer Olympics in 1908, pushing Russia—who won 18 gold medals and 64 medals in total, after doping redistributions (initially 24 gold and 82 total)—into fourth place.

Key

‡ Changes in medal standings (see subpage)

* Host nation (Great Britain)

2012 Summer Olympics medal table
Rank	NOC	Gold	Silver	Bronze	Total
1	United States‡	48	26	32	106
2	China‡	39	31	22	92
3	Great Britain*‡	29	18	18	65
4	Russia‡	18	19	26	63
5	South Korea‡	13	9	9	31
6	Germany‡	11	20	13	44
7	France‡	11	11	13	35
8	Australia‡	8	15	12	35
9	Italy	8	9	11	28
10	Hungary‡	8	4	6	18
11–86	Remaining NOCs	110	143	191	444
Totals (86 entries)		303	305	353	961

=== Podium sweeps ===
Date	Sport	Event	NOC	Gold	Silver	Bronze
28 July	Fencing	Women's foil	Italy	Elisa Di Francisca	Arianna Errigo	Valentina Vezzali
9 August	Athletics	Men's 200 metres	Jamaica	Usain Bolt	Yohan Blake	Warren Weir
11 August	Athletics	Women's 20 kilometres walk	China	Qieyang Shenjie	Liu Hong	Lü Xiuzhi

== Broadcasting ==
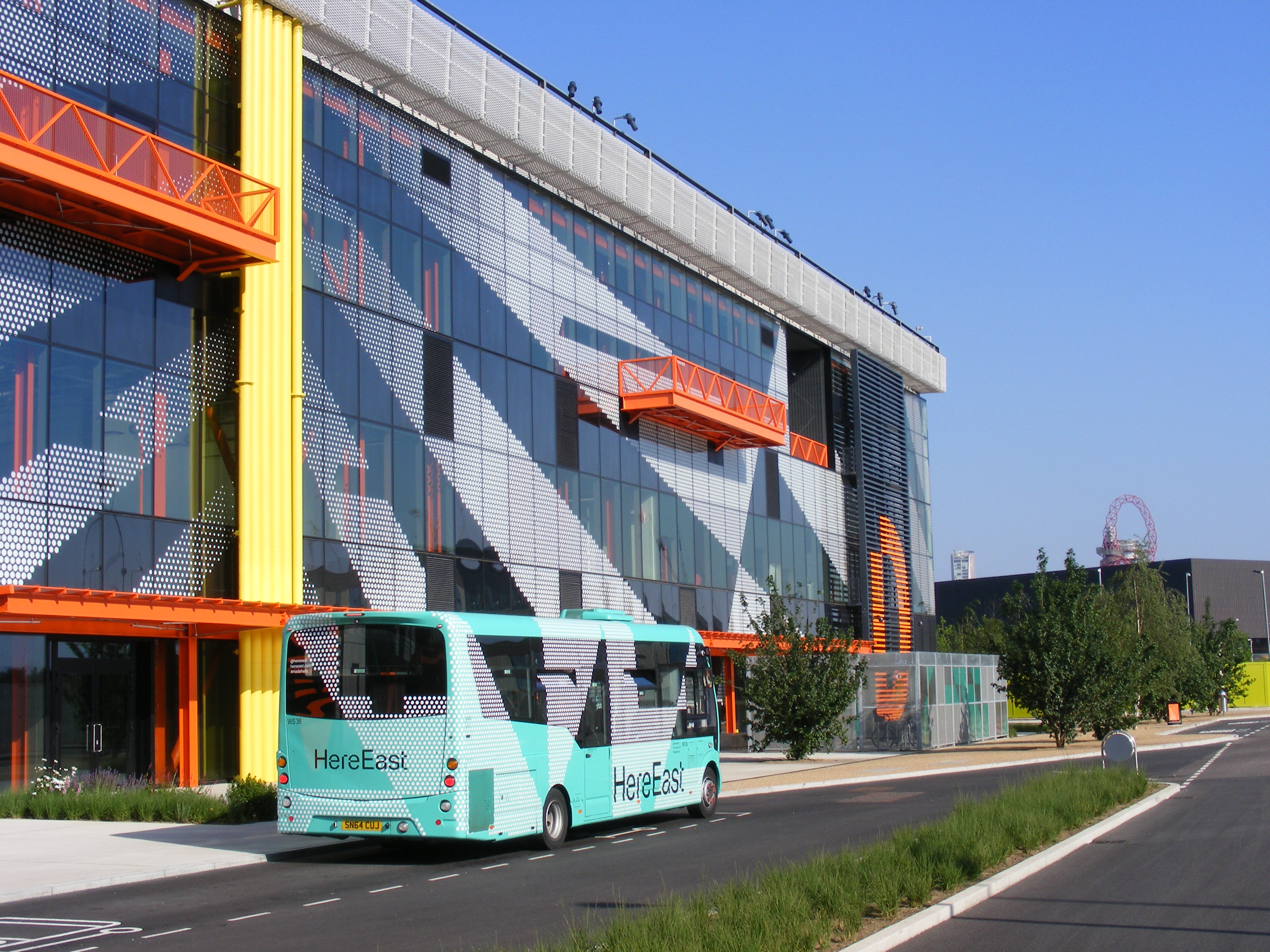
Here East, the former London Olympics Media Centre. It now accommodates campuses for Staffordshire University, Loughborough University and University College London and is a location for start-up businesses.

The host broadcaster was Olympic Broadcasting Services (OBS), an agency of the IOC. The OBS used its own cameras and crews subcontracted from other Olympic broadcasters to cover the events. The base video and audio were sold to other broadcasters, who added their own commentary and presentation.

The official recording format of the 2012 Summer Olympics used Panasonic's digital technologies. The official video was produced and distributed from the International Broadcast Centre in 1080/50i High-Definition (HD) format. Panasonic announced that DVCPRO HD would be the official recording format. OBS London used P2 HD shoulder-mount camcorders.

The IOC wanted television coverage to reach as broad a worldwide audience as possible, and several national and regional broadcasters covered London 2012. In the UK, the BBC carried the Olympics and Channel 4 the Paralympics. The BBC aimed to broadcast all 5,000 hours of the Games. BBC Parliament's Freeview channel was suspended, BBC Three's on-air time was extended so that it could show Olympic events in the daytime, and 24 additional BBC Olympics channels were available via cable, satellite and the internet in the UK.

The US television rights, owned by NBC, accounted for more than half the rights revenue for the IOC. Despite high viewership, many viewers were disappointed with NBC's coverage. The operations of broadcasters granted rights to the Games were hosted in the dedicated International Broadcast Centre inside the security cordon of the Olympic Park. YouTube planned to stream the Games in 64 territories in Asia and Sub-Saharan Africa where there were no official broadcasters.

In Sri Lanka a dispute occurred between Sri Lanka Rupavahini Corporation (SLRC) and MBC Networks (MTV/MBC) as to who was the official broadcaster of the Games. This problem was caused as Asia-Pacific Broadcasting Union (ABU) had offered the official broadcasting rights to both networks, as both of the networks were ABU members. So SLRC filed a case against MBC Networks for broadcasting rights at the Colombo Magistrate's Court. Considering the case, the court issued a special court order preventing MBC Networks' Olympic broadcast and stated that SLRC should be the sole broadcaster. However, when the Games started, both networks broadcast most of the events simultaneously. Another dispute had previously occurred between Carlton Sports Network (CSN) and SLRC, but the Sports Minister, Mahindananda Aluthgamage, had stated that SLRC had the exclusive rights.

=== Olympic Golden Rings Awards ===
In November 2012 the IOC announced the winners of the Golden Ring Awards for the best broadcast coverage of the Games. Best Olympic Sports Production was awarded to the sailing, produced by Christopher Lincoln, Gary Milkis, and Ursula Romero. The production for the canoe/kayak slalom and the rowing/canoe sprint came second and third respectively. The award for Best On Air Promotion went to NBC with Foxtel and ZDF finishing second and third. NBC Olympics also won the Best Olympic Feature category, as Sky Italia came second and ZDF third. The Best Athlete Profile award went to TV Record's profile of Sarah Menezes, NBC came second with their profile of David Rudisha, and ESPN Latin America took third place with a profile of Miguel Correa and Ruben Rezola. The award for Best Olympic Programme went to NBC, host broadcasters the BBC took second place for Super Saturday (the middle Saturday of the Games), and third place was claimed by the Nine Network for their live coverage of Day 16 of the Games.

== Marketing ==
"Survival" by Muse was announced as the official song of the Olympics, to be played by international broadcasters reporting on the Games. The track was noted to express a sense of conviction and determination to win. In August 2009 Royal Mail commissioned artists and illustrators to design 30 stamps, which were released in batches of 10 between 2009 and 2011. The last ones were released on 22 July 2011. Two £5 coins designed by Saiman Miah were made to commemorate the Olympics. As with other Olympics since 1952, the Royal Mint struck a set of commemorative one-kilogram gold and silver coins.

=== Motto ===
The official motto for the 2012 Summer Olympics was "Inspire a generation". It was chosen to highlight the organisers' commitment to inspire the world, including younger generations, to get involved in sporting events through the Games' legacy. A secondary motto of "Be part of it" was also used throughout marketing.

=== Logo and graphics ===
There were two London 2012 logos: one used for the bidding process, and the other used in the branding for the Games themselves. The bid logo, created by Kino Design, was a ribbon with blue, yellow, black, green, and red stripes winding through the text "LONDON 2012", making the shape of the River Thames in East London. The main logo, designed by Wolff Olins and published on 4 June 2007, is a representation of the number 2012, with the Olympic Rings embedded within the zero.

The Paralympics logo (far left) and the different official colour combinations for the Wolff Olins main logo design

Public reaction to the main logo in a June 2007 BBC poll was negative; more than 80% of votes gave it the lowest possible rating. Several newspapers ran their own logo competitions, displaying alternative submissions from their readers, and several writers from news agencies criticised the logo. It was suggested that the logo resembled a broken swastika or the American cartoon character Lisa Simpson performing fellatio. In February 2011 Iran threatened to boycott the Olympics, complaining that the logo appeared to spell out the word "Zion". However, this boycott did not occur.

=== Colours ===
The four main colours used in the branding of the Games were pink, blue, green and orange. These colours were chosen to showcase the spirit of the Games: energetic, spirited, youthful, and bright.

The auxiliary colours used in the branding were dark purple, grey, and gold. These were mostly used in symbols and graphics to offset the brightness of the main colours.

=== Mascots ===
The official mascots for the 2012 Summer Olympics and Paralympic Games were unveiled on 19 May 2010. Wenlock and Mandeville are animations depicting two drops of steel from a steelworks in Bolton. They are named after Much Wenlock, a town in Shropshire that holds a forerunner of the current Olympic Games, and Stoke Mandeville, a village in Buckinghamshire where a forerunner of the Paralympic Games was first held. The writer Michael Morpurgo wrote the story concept for the mascots, and an animation was produced. Four stories have been created about the mascots: Out Of A Rainbow, Adventures On A Rainbow, Rainbow Rescue, and Rainbow to the Games.

Creative Review magazine praised the mascots, but elsewhere their design was greeted with some disdain. However, the mascots' creators claimed that young people found the duo appealing.

=== Chariots of Fire ===
The 1981 Academy Award for Best Picture–winning film Chariots of Fire, which tells the story of two British athletes in the 1924 Olympics, was a recurring theme in promotions for the 2012 Olympics. A digitally re-mastered version of Chariots of Fire was released on 13 July 2012 and screened in over 100 UK cinemas as part of the celebrations, and a stage adaptation ran in London theatres from 9 May 2012 to 5 January 2013. The film's theme tune was performed during the opening ceremony by the London Symphony Orchestra, conducted by Simon Rattle. The performance was accompanied by a comedic skit by Rowan Atkinson, which included the opening beach-running footage from the film. A new orchestration of the film's theme tune was played during each medal presentation of the Games.

== Controversies ==
During the lead-up to the Games, there were controversies over sponsorship, the athletes' use of social media, and several political issues. After a complicated lottery process, thousands of people failed to secure seats for the events they wanted, but a large number of empty seats were observed early in the Games, even at some of the most popular events. There was speculation that this was due to a failure of corporate sponsors to make use of tickets they had received.

During the Games, eight competitors in the badminton women's doubles were disqualified for "not using best efforts", when they tried to lose matches in the group stage to obtain more favourable fixtures in the knockout rounds. A number of results in boxing, gymnastics and judo were overturned by officials after initial decisions were appealed against.

== Drug testing and doping violations ==
It was announced before the Summer Games that half of all the competitors would be tested for drugs, with 150 scientists set to take 6,000 samples between the start of the Games and the end of the Paralympic Games. Every competitor who won a medal was also tested. The Olympic laboratory tested up to 400 samples every day for more than 240 prohibited substances.

Although there were less than 10 doping violations detected during the games, in the years following many samples were retested with improved laboratory procedures. This resulted in a large number of disqualifications and rescinded medals. As of mid 2024, 44 medals have been stripped due to doping violations with around 130 total disqualifications. In particular, almost 50 were from Russian athletes. Testing for drugs was completed by GSK (GlaxoSmithKline).

== In popular culture ==
- In the film 2012, numerous earthquakes occur around the globe as a result of the 2012 apocalypse, while the games are put on hold amid protests marched down 10 Downing Street, as reported in a news broadcast on television.
- The 2024 biographical film, The Fire Inside, depicts the games and narrates the life of gold medalist Claressa "T-Rex" Shields.

== See also ==
- 2012 Summer Paralympics
- Olympic Games held in Great Britain
  - 1908 Summer Olympics – London
  - 1948 Summer Olympics – London
  - 2012 Summer Olympics – London
- List of IOC country codes
- 2012 Olympic hunger summit
- Twenty Twelve, a comedy mockumentary featuring a fictional London Olympics committee
- 2017 World Championships in Athletics, athletics event also held at the London Stadium

== Notes ==
Summer Olympics
Preceded by Beijing	XXX Olympiad; London; 2012	Succeeded by Rio de Janeiro
