= Egypt at the 2008 Summer Olympics =

- IOC code: EGY
- NOC: Egyptian Olympic Committee
- Website: www.egyptianolympic.org (in Arabic and English)

in Beijing
- Competitors: 100 in 19 sports
- Flag bearers: Karam Gaber (opening); Amro El Geziry (closing)
- Medals Ranked 80th: Gold 0 Silver 0 Bronze 2 Total 2

Summer Olympics appearances (overview)
- 1912; 1920; 1924; 1928; 1932; 1936; 1948; 1952; 1956; 1960–1964; 1968; 1972; 1976; 1980; 1984; 1988; 1992; 1996; 2000; 2004; 2008; 2012; 2016; 2020; 2024; 2028

Other related appearances
- 1906 Intercalated Games –––– United Arab Republic (1960, 1964)

Egypt was represented at the 2008 Summer Olympics in Beijing, China by the Egyptian Olympic Committee.

In total, 100 athletes including 74 men and 26 women represented Egypt in 19 different sports including archery, athletics, badminton, boxing, equestrian, fencing, gymnastics, handball, judo, modern pentathlon, rowing, shooting, swimming, synchronised swimming, table tennis, taekwondo, volleyball, weightlifting and wrestling.

Egypt won two medals at the Games after Abeer Abdelrahman and Hesham Mesbah won bronze in the women's weightlifting and men's judo, respectively.

== Competitors ==
In total, 100 athletes represented Egypt at the 2008 Summer Olympics in Beijing, China across 19 different sports.

Sport	Me	Women	Total
Archery	1	1	2
Athletics	4	0	4
Badminton	0	1	1
Boxing	3	0	3
Equestrian	1	0	1
Fencing	6	4	10
Gymnastics	1	1	2
Handball	14	0	14
Judo	4	0	4
Modern pentathlon	1	2	3
Rowing	5	1	6
Shooting	7	2	9
Swimming	3	0	3
Synchronised swimming	–	8	8
Table tennis	3	2	5
Taekwondo	0	1	1
Volleyball	12	0	12
Weightlifting	4	1	5
Wrestling	6	1	7
Total	74	26	100

== Medalists ==
Egypt won a total of two medals at the games after Hesham Mesbah won bronze in the judo men's –90 kg category and Abeer Abdelrahman won bronze in the weightlifting women's –69 kg category.

Medal	Name	Sport	Event	Date
Bronze	Hesham Mesbah	Judo	Men's –90 kg	13 August
Bronze	Abeer Abdelrahman	Weightlifting	Women's –69 kg	13 August

== Archery ==
In total, one Egyptian athlete participated in the archery events – Maged Youssef in the men's individual.

Athlete	Event	Ranking round		Round of 64	Round of 32	Round of 16	Quarterfinals	Semifinals	Final / BM	
Athlete	Event	Score	Seed	Opposition Score	Opposition Score	Opposition Score	Opposition Score	Opposition Score	Opposition Score	Rank
Maged Youssef	Men's individual	605	62	Ruban (UKR) (3); L 96–111	did not advance					
Soha Abed Elaal	Women's individual	587	57	Folkard (GBR) (8); L 95–107	did not advance					

== Athletics ==
In total, four Egyptian athletes participated in the athletics events – Mohsen El Anany in the men's hammer throw, Omar El Ghazali in the men's discus throw, Yasser Farag in the men's shot put and Amr Ibrahim Mostafa Seoud in the men's 200 m.

Track & road events

Athlete	Event	Heat		Quarterfinal		Semifinal		Final	
Athlete	Event	Result	Rank	Result	Rank	Result	Rank	Result	Rank
Amr Ibrahim Mostafa Seoud	200 m	20.75	5 q	20.55	6	did not advance			

Field events

Athlete	Event	Qualification		Final	
Athlete	Event	Distance	Position	Distance	Position
Mohsen El Anany	Hammer throw	NM	—	did not advance	
Omar El Ghazali	Discus throw	60.24	23	did not advance	
Yasser Farag	Shot put	18.42	37	did not advance	

== Badminton ==
In total, one Egyptian athlete participated in the badminton events – Hadia Hosny in the women's singles.

Athlete	Event	Round of 64	Round of 32	Round of 16	Quarterfinal	Semifinal	Final / BM	
Athlete	Event	Opposition Score	Opposition Score	Opposition Score	Opposition Score	Opposition Score	Opposition Score	Rank
Hadia Hosny	Women's singles	Angulo (MEX); W 21–18, 7–21, 21–14	Nedelcheva (BUL); L 7–21, 4–21	did not advance				

== Boxing ==
In total, three Egyptian athletes participated in the boxing events – Hosam Bakr Abdin in the welterweight category, Mohamed Hikal in the middleweight category and Ramadan Yasser in the light heavyweight category.

Athlete	Event	Round of 32	Round of 16	Quarterfinals	Semifinals	Final	
Athlete	Event	Opposition Result	Opposition Result	Opposition Result	Opposition Result	Opposition Result	Rank
Hosam Bakr Abdin	Welterweight	Bye	Boonjumnong (THA); W 11–10	Banteaux (CUB); L 2–10	did not advance		
Mohamed Hikal	Middleweight	DeGale (GBR); L 4–13	did not advance				
Ramadan Yasser	Light heavyweight	Magomedov (BLR); W 10^{+}–10	Benchabla (ALG); L 6–13	did not advance			

== Equestrian ==
In total, one Egyptian athlete participated in the equestrian events – Karim El-Zoghby in the individual jumping.

Athlete	Horse	Event	Qualification								Final					Total	
Athlete	Horse	Event	Round 1		Round 2			Round 3			Round A		Round B			Total	
Athlete	Horse	Event	Penalties	Rank	Penalties	Total	Rank	Penalties	Total	Rank	Penalties	Rank	Penalties	Total	Rank	Penalties	Rank
Karim El-Zoghby	Aladin	Individual	52	76	Withdrew			did not advance									

== Fencing ==
In total, 10 Egyptian athletes participated in the fencing events – Eman El Gammal, Shaimaa El Gammal, Aya El Sayed, Tamim Ghazy, Gamal Fathy, Ahmed Nabil, Mostafa Nagaty, Mahmoud Samir, Iman Shaban, Salma Soueif and Shadi Talaat.

Men

Athlete	Event	Round of 64	Round of 32	Round of 16	Quarterfinal	Semifinal	Final / BM	
Athlete	Event	Opposition Score	Opposition Score	Opposition Score	Opposition Score	Opposition Score	Opposition Score	Rank
Ahmed Nabil	Individual épée	Novosjolov (EST); L 8–15	did not advance					
Mostafa Nagaty	Individual foil	—N/a	Meinhardt (USA); L 3–15	did not advance				
Gamal Fathy	Individual sabre	Beaudry (CAN); L 8–15	did not advance					
Mahmoud Samir	Individual sabre	Agresta (BRA); L 10–15	did not advance					
Shadi Talaat	Individual sabre	Pryiemka (BLR); L 7–15	did not advance					
Gamal Fathy; Tamim Ghazy; Mahmoud Samir; Shadi Talaat	Team sabre	—N/a			France; L 31–45	Classification semi-final Belarus; L 22–45	7th place final Hungary; L 25–45	8

Women

Athlete	Event	Round of 64	Round of 32	Round of 16	Quarterfinal	Semifinal	Final / BM	
Athlete	Event	Opposition Score	Opposition Score	Opposition Score	Opposition Score	Opposition Score	Opposition Score	Rank
Aya El Sayed	Individual épée	—N/a	Picot (FRA); L 7–15	did not advance				
Eman El Gammal	Individual foil	Angad-Gaur (NED); L 4–13	did not advance					
Shaimaa El Gammal	Individual foil	Shaban (EGY); W 15–12	Nam H-H (KOR); L 6–15	did not advance				
Iman Shaban	Individual foil	S El Gammal (EGY); L 12–15	did not advance					
Eman El Gammal; Shaimaa El Gammal; Iman Shaban; Salma Soueif	Team foil	—N/a			Russia; L 23–45	Classification semi-final China; L 24–45	7th place final Poland; L 14–45	8

== Gymnastics ==
In total, two Egyptian athletes participated in the gymnastics events – Sherine El-Zeiny in the women's artistic individual all-around and Mohamed Serour in the men's artistic individual all-around.

Men

Athlete	Event	Qualification								Final							
Athlete	Event	Apparatus						Total	Rank	Apparatus						Total	Rank
Athlete	Event	F	PH	R	V	PB	HB	Total	Rank	F	PH	R	V	PB	HB	Total	Rank
Mohamed Serour	All-around	13.450	13.250	12.675	15.325	12.375	14.125	81.200	44	did not advance							

Women

Athlete	Event	Qualification						Final					
Athlete	Event	Apparatus				Total	Rank	Apparatus				Total	Rank
Athlete	Event	F	V	UB	BB	Total	Rank	F	V	UB	BB	Total	Rank
Sherine El-Zeiny	All-around	12.650	13.750	10.600	13.000	50.000	61	did not advance					

== Handball ==
In total, 14 Egyptian athletes participated in the handball events – Abouelfetoh Abdelrazek, Ahmed El Ahmar, Hany El-Fakharany, Mohamed Bakir El-Nakib, Mohamed Abd El-Salam, Mahmoud Hassaballah, Mustafa Hussien, Belal Mabrouk, Hassan Mabrouk, Hussein Mabrouk, Walid Abdel Maksoud, Mohamed Ramadan, Hassan Yousry and Hussein Zaky in the men's tournament.

Group play

Team	Pld	W	D	L	GF	GA	GD	Pts	Qualification
South Korea	5	3	0	2	122	129	−7	6	Qualified for the quarterfinals
Denmark	5	2	2	1	137	131	+6	6	Qualified for the quarterfinals
Iceland	5	2	2	1	151	146	+5	6	Qualified for the quarterfinals
Russia	5	2	1	2	136	131	+5	5	Qualified for the quarterfinals
Germany	5	2	1	2	126	130	−4	5	
Egypt	5	0	2	3	127	132	−5	2	

10 August 2008; 20:45	Denmark	23 – 23	Egypt	Olympic Sports Centre Gymnasium; Referees: Bord, Buy (FRA)
10 August 2008; 20:45	Christiansen 6	(11–10)	El-Ahmar 8	Olympic Sports Centre Gymnasium; Referees: Bord, Buy (FRA)
10 August 2008; 20:45	3× (yellow card) 4× (suspension) 1× (red card)	Report	4× (yellow card) 4× (suspension)	Olympic Sports Centre Gymnasium; Referees: Bord, Buy (FRA)

12 August 2008; 10:45	Egypt	27 – 28	Russia	Olympic Sports Centre Gymnasium; Referees: Liudowyk, Vakula (UKR)
12 August 2008; 10:45	El Ahmar 10	(14–14)	Rastvortsev 8	Olympic Sports Centre Gymnasium; Referees: Liudowyk, Vakula (UKR)
12 August 2008; 10:45	3× (yellow card) 4× (suspension)	Report	3× (yellow card) 4× (suspension)	Olympic Sports Centre Gymnasium; Referees: Liudowyk, Vakula (UKR)

14 August 2008; 09:00	Germany	25 – 23	Egypt	Olympic Sports Centre Gymnasium; Referees: Krstic, Ljubic (SLO)
14 August 2008; 09:00	Glandorf 7	(14–14)	Zaky 7	Olympic Sports Centre Gymnasium; Referees: Krstic, Ljubic (SLO)
14 August 2008; 09:00	3× (yellow card) 5× (suspension)	Report	4× (yellow card) 8× (suspension)	Olympic Sports Centre Gymnasium; Referees: Krstic, Ljubic (SLO)

16 August 2008; 10:45	Egypt	22 – 24	South Korea	Olympic Sports Centre Gymnasium; Referees: Breto, Huelin (ESP)
16 August 2008; 10:45	Abd Elsalam 8	(11–8)	Paek Won-chul 7	Olympic Sports Centre Gymnasium; Referees: Breto, Huelin (ESP)
16 August 2008; 10:45	3× (yellow card) 6× (suspension) 1× (red card)	Report	3× (yellow card) 3× (suspension)	Olympic Sports Centre Gymnasium; Referees: Breto, Huelin (ESP)

18 August 2008; 09:00	Iceland	32 – 32	Egypt	Olympic Sports Centre Gymnasium; Referees: Din, Dinu (ROU)
18 August 2008; 09:00	Sigurðsson 10	(14–17)	Zaky 9	Olympic Sports Centre Gymnasium; Referees: Din, Dinu (ROU)
18 August 2008; 09:00	4× (yellow card) 4× (suspension)	Report	3× (yellow card) 6× (suspension)	Olympic Sports Centre Gymnasium; Referees: Din, Dinu (ROU)

== Judo ==
In total, four Egyptian athletes participated in the judo events – Amin El Hady in the men's −66 kg category, Islam El Shehaby in the men's +100 kg category, Hesham Mesbah in the men's −90 kg category and Samah Ramadan in the women's +78 kg category.

Men

Athlete	Event	Preliminary	Round of 32	Round of 16	Quarterfinals	Semifinals	Repechage 1	Repechage 2	Repechage 3	Final / BM	
Athlete	Event	Opposition Result	Opposition Result	Opposition Result	Opposition Result	Opposition Result	Opposition Result	Opposition Result	Opposition Result	Opposition Result	Rank
Amin El Hady	−66 kg	Bye	Nazaryan (ARM); W 0001–0000	Arencibia (CUB); L 0000–0001	did not advance		García (AND); W 1001–0001	Takata (USA); W 1000–0001	Sharipov (UZB); L 0001–0101	did not advance	
Hesham Mesbah	−90 kg	—N/a	Choi S-H (KOR); W 0000–0000 YUS	Tsirekidze (GEO); L 0001–0010	did not advance		Bye	Mammadov (AZE); W 0011–0010	Kazusionak (BLR); W 1001–0001	Dafreville (FRA); W 1000–0000	3rd place, bronze medalist(s)
Islam El Shehaby	+100 kg	Bye	Bor (HUN); W 0120–0010	Ishii (JPN); L 0000–1001	did not advance		Bianchessi (ITA); L 0000–0010	did not advance			

Women

Athlete	Event	Round of 32	Round of 16	Quarterfinals	Semifinals	Repechage 1	Repechage 2	Repechage 3	Final / BM	
Athlete	Event	Opposition Result	Opposition Result	Opposition Result	Opposition Result	Opposition Result	Opposition Result	Opposition Result	Opposition Result	Rank
Samah Ramadan	+78 kg	Bye	Ortiz (CUB); L 0000–0110	did not advance		Bye	Shepherd (AUS); W 1000–0000	Kim N-Y (KOR); L 0000–0200	did not advance	

== Modern pentathlon ==
In total, three Egyptian athletes participated in the modern pentathlon events – Amro El Geziry in the men's competition and Omnia Fakhry and Aya Medany in the women's competition.

Athlete	Event	Shooting (10 m air pistol)			Fencing (épée one touch)			Swimming (200 m freestyle)			Riding (show jumping)			Running (3000 m)			Total points	Final rank
Athlete	Event	Points	Rank	MP Points	Results	Rank	MP points	Time	Rank	MP points	Penalties	Rank	MP points	Time	Rank	MP Points	Total points	Final rank
Amro El Geziry	Men's	174	29	1024	15–20	24	760	1:55.86	1	1412 OR	716	31	484	9:58.55	30	1008	4688	32
Omnia Fakhry	Women's	186	5	1168	17–18	=18	808	2:15.72	9	1292	312	35	776	11:32.10	33	952	4996	30
Aya Medany	Women's	184	9	1144	22–13	=5	928	2:15.69	8	1292	196	30	1004	10:36.05	11	1176	5544	8

== Rowing ==
In total, six Egyptian athletes participated in the rowing events – Heba Ahmed in the women's single sculls, Ali Ibrahim in the men's single sculls and Ibrahim Abd El Razek, Ahmed Gad, Amin Ramadan and Mohamed Zidan in the men's lightweight coxless four.

Men

Athlete	Event	Heats		Repechage		Quarterfinals		Semifinals		Final	
Athlete	Event	Time	Rank	Time	Rank	Time	Rank	Time	Rank	Time	Rank
Ali Ibrahim	Single sculls	7:43.70	3 QF	—N/a		7:24.77	6 SC/D	7:20.73	3 FC	7:26.06	18
Ibrahim Abd El Razek; Ahmed Gad; Amin Ramadan; Mohamed Zidan	Lightweight four	6:11.71	5 R	6:37.50	4	—N/a		did not advance			

Women

Athlete	Event	Heats		Quarterfinals		Semifinals		Final	
Athlete	Event	Time	Rank	Time	Rank	Time	Rank	Time	Rank
Heba Ahmed	Single sculls	8:46.96	4 FE	Bye				8:07.10	24

== Shooting ==
In total, nine Egyptian athletes participated in the shooting events – Samy Abdel Razek in the men's 50 m pistol, Mohamed Abdellah in the men's 10 m air rifle, Mahmod Abdelaly in the men's 10 m air pistol, Mohamed Amer in the men's 50 m rifle three positions, Franco Donato in the men's skeet, Mona El-Hawary in the women's skeet, Shaimaa Abdel-Latif-Hashad in the women's 10 m air rifle, Adham Medhat in the men's trap and Hazem Mohamed in the men's 50 m rifle prone.

Men

Athlete	Event	Qualification		Final	
Athlete	Event	Points	Rank	Points	Rank
Samy Abdel Razek	50 m pistol	549	32	did not advance	
Mohamed Abdellah	10 m air rifle	586	43	did not advance	
Mahmod Abdelaly	10 m air pistol	563	47	did not advance	
Mohamed Amer	50 m rifle 3 positions	1135	46	did not advance	
Franco Donato	Skeet	106	36	did not advance	
Adham Medhat	Trap	108	32	did not advance	
Hazem Mohamed	50 m rifle prone	576	56	did not advance	

Women

Athlete	Event	Qualification		Final	
Athlete	Event	Points	Rank	Points	Rank
Mona El-Hawary	Skeet	50	19	did not advance	
Shaimaa Abdel-Latif-Hashad	10 m air rifle	393	23	did not advance	

== Swimming ==
In total, three Egyptian athletes participated in the swimming events – Mohamed El Nady in the men's 50 m freestyle, Mohamed Monir in the men's 10 km open water and Ahmed Nada in the men's 100 m butterfly.

Athlete	Event	Heat		Semifinal		Final	
Athlete	Event	Time	Rank	Time	Rank	Time	Rank
Mohamed El Nady	50 m freestyle	23.92	54	did not advance			
Mohamed Monir	10 km open water	—N/a				1:55:17.0	20
Ahmed Nada	100 m butterfly	55.59	61	did not advance			

== Synchronised swimming ==
In total, eight Egyptian athletes participated in the synchronised swimming events – Reem Abdalazem, Aziza Abdelfattah, Shaza Abdelrahman, Lamyaa Badawi, Hagar Badran, Dalia El Gebaly, Youmna Khallaf, Mai Mohamed and Nouran Saleh.

Athlete	Event	Technical routine		Free routine (preliminary)			Free routine (final)		
Athlete	Event	Points	Rank	Points	Total (technical + free)	Rank	Points	Total (technical + free)	Rank
Reem Abdalazem; Dalia El Gebaly	Duet	40.417	24	40.250	80.667	24	did not advance		
Reem Abdalazem; Aziza Abdelfattah; Shaza Abdelrahman; Lamyaa Badawi; Hagar Badran; Dalia El Gebaly; Youmna Khallaf; Mai Mohamed; Nouran Saleh	Team	39.750	8	—N/a			41.083	80.833	8

== Table tennis ==
In total, five Egyptian athletes participated in the table tennis events – Shaimaa Abdul-Aziz and Noha Yossry in the women's singles and El-Sayed Lashin, Adel Massaad and Ahmed Saleh in the men's singles.

Athlete	Event	Preliminary round	Round 1	Round 2	Round 3	Round 4	Quarterfinals	Semifinals	Final / BM	
Athlete	Event	Opposition Result	Opposition Result	Opposition Result	Opposition Result	Opposition Result	Opposition Result	Opposition Result	Opposition Result	Rank
El-Sayed Lashin	Men's singles	Tabachnik (ARG); W 4–2	Freitas (POR); L 1–4	did not advance						
Adel Massaad	Men's singles	Carneros (ESP); L 2–4	did not advance							
Ahmed Saleh	Men's singles	Davis (AUS); W 4–1	Éloi (FRA); L 3–4	did not advance						
Shaimaa Abdul-Aziz	Women's singles	Pan L-c (TPE); L 0–4	did not advance							
Noha Yossry	Women's singles	Sorochinskaya (UKR); L 0–4	did not advance							

== Taekwondo ==
In total, one Egyptian athlete participated in the taekwondo events – Noha Abd Rabo in the women's +67 kg category.

Athlete	Event	Round of 16	Quarterfinals	Semifinals	Repechage	Bronze Medal	Final	
Athlete	Event	Opposition Result	Opposition Result	Opposition Result	Opposition Result	Opposition Result	Opposition Result	Rank
Noha Abd Rabo	Women's +67 kg	Solheim (NOR); L 3–9	did not advance		Che C C (MAS); W 5–1	Stevenson (GBR); L 1–5	Did not advance	5

== Volleyball ==
In total, 12 Egyptian athletes participated in the volleyball events – Ashraf Abouelhassan, Abdalla Ahmed, Abdel Latif Ahmed, Wael Al-Aydy, Hamdy Awad, Mohamed Badawy, Mahmoud Abd El Kader, Mohamed Seif El-Nasr, Mohamed Gabal, Hossameldin Gomaa, Ahmed Abdel Naeim and Saleh Youssef in the indoor men's tournament.

Group play

Pos	Team	Pld	W	L	Pts	SPW	SPL	SPR	SW	SL	SR	Qualification
1	Brazil	5	4	1	9	427	373	1.145	13	4	3.250	Quarterfinals
2	Russia	5	4	1	9	496	447	1.110	14	7	2.000	Quarterfinals
3	Poland	5	4	1	9	434	404	1.074	12	6	2.000	Quarterfinals
4	Serbia	5	2	3	7	440	439	1.002	9	10	0.900	Quarterfinals
5	Germany	5	1	4	6	418	440	0.950	6	12	0.500	
6	Egypt	5	0	5	5	267	379	0.704	0	15	0.000	

10 August 2008; 15:20	Brazil	3–0	Egypt	Capital Indoor Stadium, Beijing; Attendance: 8,500; Referees: Ning Wang (CHN), Mohammad Shahmiri (IRI)
10 August 2008; 15:20	(25–19, 25–15, 25–18) result statistics			Capital Indoor Stadium, Beijing; Attendance: 8,500; Referees: Ning Wang (CHN), Mohammad Shahmiri (IRI)

12 August 2008; 13:00	Egypt	0–3	Poland	Beijing Institute of Technology Gymnasium, Beijing; Attendance: 3,000; Referees: Mohammad Shahmiri (IRI), Patricia Salvatore (USA)
12 August 2008; 13:00	(21–25, 18–25, 10–25) result statistics			Beijing Institute of Technology Gymnasium, Beijing; Attendance: 3,000; Referees: Mohammad Shahmiri (IRI), Patricia Salvatore (USA)

14 August 2008; 12:00	Germany	3–0	Egypt	Beijing Institute of Technology Gymnasium, Beijing; Attendance: 3,200; Referees: Ibrahim Al-Naama (QAT), Jiang Liu (CHN)
14 August 2008; 12:00	(29–27, 25–21, 25–21) result statistics			Beijing Institute of Technology Gymnasium, Beijing; Attendance: 3,200; Referees: Ibrahim Al-Naama (QAT), Jiang Liu (CHN)

16 August 2008; 12:00	Russia	3–0	Egypt	Beijing Institute of Technology Gymnasium, Beijing; Attendance: 3,200; Referees: Jiang Liu (CHN), Ibrahim Al-Naama (QAT)
16 August 2008; 12:00	(25–19, 25–14, 25–18) result statistics			Beijing Institute of Technology Gymnasium, Beijing; Attendance: 3,200; Referees: Jiang Liu (CHN), Ibrahim Al-Naama (QAT)

18 August 2008; 15:15	Egypt	0–3	Serbia	Capital Indoor Stadium, Beijing; Attendance: 6,000; Referees: Victor Rodriguez (PUR), Ibrahim Al-Naama (QAT)
18 August 2008; 15:15	(16–25, 13–25, 17–25) result statistics			Capital Indoor Stadium, Beijing; Attendance: 6,000; Referees: Victor Rodriguez (PUR), Ibrahim Al-Naama (QAT)

== Weightlifting ==
In total, five Egyptian athletes participated in the weightlifting events – Mohamed Abd Elbaki in the men's −62 kg category, Mahmoud Elhaddad in the men's −77 kg category, Abdelrahman El-Sayed in the men's −105 kg category, Abir Khalil in the women's −69 kg category and Tarek Yehia in the men's −69 kg category.

Athlete	Event	Snatch		Clean & Jerk		Total	Rank
Athlete	Event	Result	Rank	Result	Rank	Total	Rank
Mohamed Abd Elbaki	Men's −62 kg	129	12	159	7	288	8
Tarek Yehia	Men's −69 kg	138	12	172	6	310	11
Mahmoud Elhaddad	Men's −77 kg	150	15	192	7	342	12
Abdelrahman El-Sayed	Men's −105 kg	175	13	210	14	385	14
Abir Khalil	Women's −69 kg	105	6	133	5	238	3rd place, bronze medalist(s)

== Wrestling ==
In total, seven Egyptian athletes participated in the wrestling events – Ashraf El-Gharably in the men's Greco-Roman −60 kg category, Saleh Emara in the men's freestyle −96 kg category, Haiat Farag in the women's freestyle −63 kg category, Karam Gaber in the men's Greco-Roman −96 kg category, Hassan Madany in the men's freestyle −60 kg category, Mostafa Mohamed in the men's Greco-Roman −55 kg category and Yasser Sakr in the men's Greco-Roman −120 kg category.

Men's freestyle

Athlete	Event	Qualification	Round of 16	Quarterfinal	Semifinal	Repechage 1	Repechage 2	Final / BM	
Athlete	Event	Opposition Result	Opposition Result	Opposition Result	Opposition Result	Opposition Result	Opposition Result	Opposition Result	Rank
Hassan Madany	−60 kg	Bye	Mohammadi (IRI); L 0–3 ^{PO}	did not advance					18
Saleh Emara	−96 kg	Bye	Ebrahimi (IRI); L 1–3 ^{PP}	did not advance					11

Men's Greco-Roman

Athlete	Event	Qualification	Round of 16	Quarterfinal	Semifinal	Repechage 1	Repechage 2	Final / BM	
Athlete	Event	Opposition Result	Opposition Result	Opposition Result	Opposition Result	Opposition Result	Opposition Result	Opposition Result	Rank
Mostafa Mohamed	−55 kg	Bayramov (AZE); L 0–3 ^{PO}	did not advance			Bye	Hernández (CUB); L 1–3 ^{PP}	Did not advance	16
Ashraf El-Gharably	−60 kg	Diaconu (ROU); L 1–3 ^{PP}	did not advance						14
Karam Gaber	−96 kg	Bye	Guri (ALB); L 1–3 ^{PP}	did not advance					13
Yasser Sakr	−120 kg	Bye	Patrikeyev (ARM); L 1–3 ^{PP}	did not advance					19

Women's freestyle

Athlete	Event	Qualification	Round of 16	Quarterfinal	Semifinal	Repechage 1	Repechage 2	Final / BM	
Athlete	Event	Opposition Result	Opposition Result	Opposition Result	Opposition Result	Opposition Result	Opposition Result	Opposition Result	Rank
Haiat Farag	−63 kg	Miller (USA); L 0–3 ^{PO}	did not advance						13

== See also ==
- Egypt at the 2008 Summer Paralympics
