= List of Olympic women for Egypt =

The first Summer Olympic Games was held in 1896 in Athens, but women competed for the first time in next games in 1900 in Paris. An Egyptian woman was scheduled to compete for the first time in the 1972 Summer Olympics, but the Munich massacre during that Games led to the departure of Egypt's delegation before the she could compete. The Egyptian woman made her first appearance in 1984 Summer Olympics in Los Angeles, 88 years after the first tournament, to become the fourth Arab woman to take part in the Olympics after Algeria, Libya, and Syria. Since then, the Egyptian women have taken part in every Summer Olympic Games.

The number of female Egyptian Olympic participants varied from their first appearance in 1984 Summer Olympics which witnessed the participant of 6 women, which was the highest (6 Sportswoman) till 2000 Summer Olympics in Sydney (15 sportswoman)، Since then, number of participants increased on each tournament until it reached 37 women in 2016 Summer Olympics Same for sports, number of various sports that Egyptian women participated in one tournament was the maximum in first appear in 1984 Summer Olympics (4 sports) till 2000 tournament when it increased to 9, and it kept increasing till 2016 games (18 Sport).

Egypt didn't have any female Olympic medalist for 120 years. On 10 August 2016, the Egyptian weightlifter Sara Ahmed became the first Egyptian female medalist by winning the bronze medal in weightlifting 69 kg event by lifting total of 255 kg, she was also the first Arabian woman to win an Olympic medal in weightlifting.

== Sportswomen ==
| Name | Sport | Age at first app. | Games | | | | | | | | | No. of Games | Medals | | |
| Name | Sport | Age at first app. | 1984 | 1988 | 1992 | 1996 | 2000 | 2004 | 2008 | 2012 | 2016 | No. of Games | 1st place, gold medalist(s) | 2nd place, silver medalist(s) | 3rd place, bronze medalist(s) |
|---|---|---|---|---|---|---|---|---|---|---|---|---|---|---|---|
| Ebtissam Mohamed | Cycling | 19 | | | | | | | | | ● | 1 | 0 | 0 | 0 |
| Esra'a Ahmed | Weightlifting | 17 | | | | | | | | | ● | 1 | 0 | 0 | 0 |
| Engy Mohamed | Weightlifting | 19 | | | | | | ● | | | | 1 | 0 | 0 | 0 |
| Eman El Gammal | Fencing | 26 | | | | | | | ● | ● | | 2 | 0 | 0 | 0 |
| Eman Gaber | Fencing | 19 | | | | | | | ● | ● | | 2 | 0 | 0 | 0 |
| Enas Mostafa | Wrestling | 27 | | | | | | | | | ● | 1 | 0 | 0 | 0 |
| Omnia Fakhry | Modern Pentathlon | 26 | | | | | | | ● | | | 1 | 0 | 0 | 0 |
| Aya El-Sayed | Fencing | 19 | | | | | | | ● | | | 1 | 0 | 0 | 0 |
| Aya Darwish | Synchronized Swimming | 17 | | | | | | | | ● | | 1 | 0 | 0 | 0 |
| Aya Medany | Modern Pentathlon | 15 | | | | | | ● | ● | ● | | 3 | 0 | 0 | 0 |
| Bacent Othman | Table Tennis | 23 | | | | | ● | | | | | 1 | 0 | 0 | 0 |
| Jomana Elmaghrabi | Synchronized Swimming | 21 | | | | | | | | | ● | 1 | 0 | 0 | 0 |
| Jermin Anwar | Taekwondo | 17 | | | | | | ● | | | | 1 | 0 | 0 | 0 |
| Haiat Farag | Wrestling | 21 | | | | | | | ● | | | 1 | 0 | 0 | 0 |
| Dara Hassanien | Synchronized Swimming | 20 | | | | | | | | | ● | 1 | 0 | 0 | 0 |
| Dalia El-Gebaly | Synchronized Swimming | 16 | | | | | | | ● | ● | | 2 | 0 | 0 | 0 |
| Dalia Allam | Synchronized Swimming | 23 | | | | | | ● | | | | 1 | 0 | 0 | 0 |
| Dahlia Mokbel | Synchronized Swimming | 15 | ● | | | | | | | | | 1 | 0 | 0 | 0 |
| Doaa Elghobashy | Beach Volleyball | 19 | | | | | | | | | ● | 1 | 0 | 0 | 0 |
| Doaa Moussa | Rowing | 22 | | | | | | ● | | | | 1 | 0 | 0 | 0 |
| Dina Hosny | Shooting | 20 | | | | | | ● | | | | 1 | 0 | 0 | 0 |
| Dina Meshref | Table Tennis | 18 | | | | | | | | ● | ● | 2 | 0 | 0 | 0 |
| Rania Elwani | Swimming | 14 | | | ● | ● | ● | | | | | 3 | 0 | 0 | 0 |
| Rabab Eid | Wrestling | 21 | | | | | | | | ● | | 1 | 0 | 0 | 0 |
| Raghd Magdy | Table Tennis | 29 | | | | | | | | ● | | 1 | 0 | 0 | 0 |
| Rana El Husseiny | Fencing | 20 | | | | | | | | ● | | 1 | 0 | 0 | 0 |
| Rim Hassan | Diving | 15 | ● | | | | | | | | | 1 | 0 | 0 | 0 |
| Reem Abdalazem | Synchronized Swimming | 15 | | | | | | | ● | ● | | 2 | 0 | 0 | 0 |
| Reem Mohamed Kassem | Swimming | 20 | | | | | | | | | ● | 1 | 0 | 0 | 0 |
| Reem Mansour | Archery | 22 | | | | | | | | | ● | 1 | 0 | 0 | 0 |
| Sara Ahmed (weightlifter) | Weightlifting | 18 | | | | | | | | | 3rd place, bronze medalist(s) | 1 | 0 | 0 | 1 |
| Sara Baraka | Rowing | 20 | | | | | | | | ● | | 1 | 0 | 0 | 0 |
| Sara Abdel Gawad | Synchronized Swimming | 18 | | | | | ● | | | | | 1 | 0 | 0 | 0 |
| Samia Ahmed | Synchronized Swimming | 20 | | | | | | | | | ● | 1 | 0 | 0 | 0 |
| Sahar Helal | Synchronized Swimming | 15 | ● | | | | | | | | | 1 | 0 | 0 | 0 |
| Sahar Youssef | Synchronized Swimming | 15 | ● | | | | | | | | | 1 | 0 | 0 | 0 |
| Salama Ismail | Swimming | 17 | | | | | | ● | | | | 1 | 0 | 0 | 0 |
| Salma Mahmoud | Gymnastics | 20 | | | | | | | | ● | | 1 | 0 | 0 | 0 |
| Salma Mahran | Fencing | 22 | | | | | | | | ● | | 1 | 0 | 0 | 0 |
| Salma Negmeldin | Synchronized Swimming | 20 | | | | | | | | | ● | 1 | 0 | 0 | 0 |
| Samah Ramadan | Judo | 26 | | | | | | ● | ● | | | 2 | 0 | 0 | 0 |
| Samar Hassounah | Synchronized Swimming | 24 | | | | | | | | ● | | 1 | 0 | 0 | 0 |
| Samar Amer | Wrestling | 21 | | | | | | | | | ● | 1 | 0 | 0 | 0 |
| Seham El-Sawalhy | Taekwondo | 21 | | | | | | | | ● | ● | 2 | 0 | 0 | 0 |
| Soha Abdel-Aal | Archery | 35 | | | | | | | ● | | | 1 | 0 | 0 | 0 |
| Shaza El-Sayed | Synchronized Swimming | 15 | | | | | | | ● | ● | | 2 | 0 | 0 | 0 |
| Shahira El-Alfy | Table Tennis | 23 | | | | | ● | | | | | 1 | 0 | 0 | 0 |
| Sherwite Hafez | Swimming | 17 | ● | | | | | | | | | 1 | 0 | 0 | 0 |
| Sherine El-Zeiny | Gymnastics | 17 | | | | | | | ● | ● | ● | 3 | 0 | 0 | 0 |
| Sherin Taama | Rhythmic Gymnastics | 18 | | | | | ● | | | | | 1 | 0 | 0 | 0 |
| Shaimaa El-Gammal | Fencing | 20 | | | | | ● | ● | ● | ● | | 4 | 0 | 0 | 0 |
| Shaimaa Abdul-Aziz | Table Tennis | 19 | | | | | ● | | ● | | | 2 | 0 | 0 | 0 |
| Shimaa Hashad | Shooting | 23 | | | | | | ● | ● | | ● | 3 | 0 | 0 | 0 |
| Shimaa Afifi | Taekwondo | 19 | | | | | ● | | | | | 1 | 0 | 0 | 0 |
| Shaimaa Khalaf | Weightlifting | 25 | | | | | | | | | ● | 1 | 0 | 0 | 0 |
| Abir Abdulrahman | Weightlifting | 16 | | | | | | | ● | ● | | 2 | 0 | 0 | 0 |
| Abeer Essawy | Taekwondo | 17 | | | | | | ● | | | | 1 | 0 | 0 | 0 |
| Aziza Abdelfattah | Synchronized Swimming | 17 | | | | | | | ● | | | 1 | 0 | 0 | 0 |
| Esmat Mansour | Weightlifting | 25 | | | | | | | | ● | | 1 | 0 | 0 | 0 |
| Afaf El-Hodhod | Shooting | 19 | | | | | | | | | ● | 1 | 0 | 0 | 0 |
| Fatma El Sharnouby | Athletics | 18 | | | | | | | | | ● | 1 | 0 | 0 | 0 |
| Fatma Rashed | Rowing | 28 | | | | | | | | ● | | 1 | 0 | 0 | 0 |
| Farida Osman | Swimming | 17 | | | | | | | | ● | ● | 2 | 0 | 0 | 0 |
| Lamyaa Badawi | Synchronized Swimming | 20 | | | | | | | ● | | | 1 | 0 | 0 | 0 |
| Lamia Bahnasawy | Archery | 19 | | | | | | ● | | | | 1 | 0 | 0 | 0 |
| Leila Abdelmoez | Synchronized Swimming | 19 | | | | | | | | | ● | 1 | 0 | 0 | 0 |
| Marwa Hussein | Athletics | 26 | | | | | | ● | | | | 1 | 0 | 0 | 0 |
| Marwa Sultan | Shooting | 17 | | | | | ● | | | | | 1 | 0 | 0 | 0 |
| Menatalla Karim | Canoeing | 20 | | | | | | | | | ● | 1 | 0 | 0 | 0 |
| Mona El-Hawary | Shooting | 45 | | | | | | | ● | ● | | 2 | 0 | 0 | 0 |
| Mona Hassanein | Fencing | 26 | | | | | | | | ● | | 1 | 0 | 0 | 0 |
| Maha Amer | Diving | 17 | | | | | | | | | ● | 1 | 0 | 0 | 0 |
| Maha Gouda | Diving | 18 | | | | | | | | | ● | 1 | 0 | 0 | 0 |
| Mai Mohamed | Synchronized Swimming | 18 | | | | | | | ● | ● | | 2 | 0 | 0 | 0 |
| May Moustafa | Fencing | 17 | | | | | ● | | | | | 1 | 0 | 0 | 0 |
| May Mansour | Archery | 19 | | | | | | ● | | | | 1 | 0 | 0 | 0 |
| Nadia Negm | Rowing | 18 | | | | | | | | | ● | 1 | 0 | 0 | 0 |
| Nadeen El-Dawlatly | Table Tennis | 19 | | | | | | | | ● | ● | 2 | 0 | 0 | 0 |
| Nariman Aly | Synchronized Swimming | 17 | | | | | | | | | ● | 1 | 0 | 0 | 0 |
| Nagwan El-Zawawi | Weightlifting | 24 | | | | | ● | | | | | 1 | 0 | 0 | 0 |
| Nada Hafez | Fencing | 18 | | | | | | | | | ● | 1 | 0 | 0 | 0 |
| Nada Saafan | Synchronized Swimming | 19 | | | | | | | | | ● | 1 | 0 | 0 | 0 |
| Nada Kamel | Archery | 21 | | | | | | | | ● | | 1 | 0 | 0 | 0 |
| Nada Meawad | Beach Volleyball | 18 | | | | | | | | | ● | 1 | 0 | 0 | 0 |
| Nehal Saafan | Synchronized Swimming | 19 | | | | | | | | | ● | 1 | 0 | 0 | 0 |
| Nihal Meshref | Table Tennis | 17 | | ● | ● | | | | | | | 2 | 0 | 0 | 0 |
| Nahla Ramadan | Weightlifting | 19 | | | | | | ● | | ● | | 2 | 0 | 0 | 0 |
| Noha Abd Rabo | Taekwondo | 21 | | | | | | | ● | | | 1 | 0 | 0 | 0 |
| Noha Yossry | Table Tennis | 16 | | | | | | | ● | | | 1 | 0 | 0 | 0 |
| Nour El-Afandi | Synchronized Swimming | 19 | | | | | | | | ● | | 1 | 0 | 0 | 0 |
| Nour Elayoubi | Synchronized Swimming | 19 | | | | | | | | | ● | 1 | 0 | 0 | 0 |
| Noura Mohamed | Fencing | 18 | | | | | | | | | ● | 1 | 0 | 0 | 0 |
| Nouran Saleh | Synchronized Swimming | 20 | | | | | | | ● | | | 1 | 0 | 0 | 0 |
| Nourhan Amer | Shooting | 19 | | | | | | | | ● | | 1 | 0 | 0 | 0 |
| Nevine Hafez | Swimming | 15 | ● | | | | | | | | | 1 | 0 | 0 | 0 |
| Hagar Badran | Synchronized Swimming | 19 | | | | | | | ● | | | 1 | 0 | 0 | 0 |
| Hadia Hosny El Said | Badminton | 20 | | | | | | | ● | ● | | 2 | 0 | 0 | 0 |
| Haydy Morsy | Modern Pentathlon | 16 | | | | | | | | | ● | 1 | 0 | 0 | 0 |
| Hebatallah El-Wazan | Shooting | 23 | | | | | ● | | | | | 1 | 0 | 0 | 0 |
| Heba Ahmed | Rowing | 23 | | | | | | | ● | | | 1 | 0 | 0 | 0 |
| Heba Hefny | Judo | 19 | | | ● | ● | ● | | | | | 3 | 0 | 0 | 0 |
| Heba Abdel Gawad | Synchronized Swimming | 18 | | | | | ● | ● | | | | 2 | 0 | 0 | 0 |
| Hedaya Malak | Taekwondo | 19 | | | | | | | | ● | 3rd place, bronze medalist(s) | 2 | 0 | 0 | 1 |
| Hadir Mekhimar | Shooting | 18 | | | | | | | | | ● | 1 | 0 | 0 | 0 |
| Yasmine Helmi | Shooting | 21 | | | | | ● | | | | | 1 | 0 | 0 | 0 |
| Yasmine Rostom | Rhythmic Gymnastics | 19 | | | | | | | | ● | | 1 | 0 | 0 | 0 |
| Yousra Abdel Razek | Table Tennis | 20 | | | | | | | | | ● | 1 | 0 | 0 | 0 |
| Youmna Khallaf | Synchronized Swimming | 16 | | | | | | | ● | ● | | 2 | 0 | 0 | 0 |
| Total | 108 | | 6 | 1 | 3 | 2 | 15 | 16 | 27 | 34 | 37 | 9 | 0 | 0 | 2 |

== Sports ==
| Sport | No. of Sportswomen | Games | | | | | | | | | No. of Games | Medals | | |
| Sport | No. of Sportswomen | 1984 | 1988 | 1992 | 1996 | 2000 | 2004 | 2008 | 2012 | 2016 | No. of Games | 1st place, gold medalist(s) | 2nd place, silver medalist(s) | 3rd place, bronze medalist(s) |
|---|---|---|---|---|---|---|---|---|---|---|---|---|---|---|
| Taekwondo | 6 | | | | | ● | ● | ● | ● | 3rd place, bronze medalist(s) | 5 | 0 | 0 | 1 |
| Rowing | 5 | | | | | | ● | ● | ● | ● | 4 | 0 | 0 | 0 |
| Gymnastics | 2 | | | | | | | ● | ● | ● | 3 | 0 | 0 | 0 |
| Rhythmic Gymnastics | 2 | | | | | ● | | | ● | | 2 | 0 | 0 | 0 |
| Judo | 2 | | | ● | ● | ● | ● | ● | | | 5 | 0 | 0 | 0 |
| Modern Pentathlon | 3 | | | | | | ● | ● | ● | ● | 4 | 0 | 0 | 0 |
| Shooting | 9 | ● | | | | ● | ● | ● | ● | ● | 6 | 0 | 0 | 0 |
| Swimming | 6 | ● | | ● | ● | ● | ● | | ● | ● | 7 | 0 | 0 | 0 |
| Synchronized Swimming | 27 | ● | | | | ● | ● | ● | ● | ● | 6 | 0 | 0 | 0 |
| Diving | 3 | ● | | | | | | | | ● | 2 | 0 | 0 | 0 |
| Fencing | 10 | | | | | ● | ● | ● | ● | ● | 5 | 0 | 0 | 0 |
| Wrestling | 4 | | | | | | | ● | ● | ● | 3 | 0 | 0 | 0 |
| Archery | 5 | | | | | | ● | ● | ● | ● | 4 | 0 | 0 | 0 |
| Athletics | 2 | | | | | | ● | | | ● | 2 | 0 | 0 | 0 |
| Table Tennis | 9 | | ● | ● | | ● | | ● | ● | ● | 6 | 0 | 0 | 0 |
| Weightlifting | 8 | | | | | ● | ● | ● | ● | 3rd place, bronze medalist(s) | 5 | 0 | 0 | 1 |
| Cycling | 1 | | | | | | | | | ● | 1 | 0 | 0 | 0 |
| Canoeing | 1 | | | | | | | | | ● | 1 | 0 | 0 | 0 |
| Badminton | 1 | | | | | | | ● | ● | | 2 | 0 | 0 | 0 |
| Beach Volleyball | 2 | | | | | | | | | ● | 1 | 0 | 0 | 0 |
| Total | 108 | 4 | 1 | 3 | 2 | 9 | 11 | 13 | 14 | 18 | 9 | 0 | 0 | 2 |
