= Belarus at the 2008 Summer Olympics =

- IOC code: BLR
- NOC: Belarus Olympic Committee
- Website: www.noc.by (in Russian and English)

in Beijing
- Competitors: 181 in 20 sports
- Flag bearers: Alexander Romankov (opening); Andrei Aramnau (closing)
- Medals Ranked 16th: Gold 3 Silver 4 Bronze 7 Total 14

Summer Olympics appearances (overview)
- 1996; 2000; 2004; 2008; 2012; 2016; 2020; 2024; 2028

Other related appearances
- Russian Empire (1900–1912); Poland (1924–1936); Soviet Union (1952–1988); Unified Team (1992); Individual Neutral Athletes (2024)

Belarus attended the 2008 Summer Olympics in Beijing, China. A team of 181 athletes competed in 28 different sports.

== Medalists ==
Medal	Name	Sport	Event
Gold	Andrei Aramnau	Weightlifting	Men's 105 kg
Gold	Andrei Bahdanovich; Aliaksandr Bahdanovich	Canoeing	Men's C-2 1000 m
Gold	Raman Piatrushenka; Aliaksei Abalmasau; Artur Litvinchuk; Vadzim Makhneu	Canoeing	Men's K-4 1000 m
Silver	Vadim Devyatovskiy	Athletics	Men's hammer throw
Silver	Andrei Krauchanka	Athletics	Men's decathlon
Silver	Inna Zhukova	Gymnastics	Women's rhythmic individual all-around
Silver	Murad Gaidarov	Wrestling	Men's 74 kg
Bronze	Ekaterina Karsten	Rowing	Women's single sculls
Bronze	Yuliya Bichyk; Natallia Helakh	Rowing	Women's coxless pair
Bronze	Ivan Tsikhan	Athletics	Men's hammer throw
Bronze	Mikhail Siamionau	Wrestling	Men's 66 kg
Bronze	Vadzim Makhneu; Raman Piatrushenka	Canoeing	Men's K-2 500 m
Bronze	Olesya Babushkina; Anastasia Ivankova; Zinaida Lunina; Glafira Martinovich; Ksenia Sankovich; Alina Tumilovich	Gymnastics	Women's rhythmic team all-around
Bronze	Anastasiya Samusevich	Modern pentathlon	Women's

== Archery ==
Belarus sent two archers to the Olympics, one in the men's competition and one in the women's.

Athlete	Event	Ranking round		Round of 64	Round of 32	Round of 16	Quarterfinals	Semifinals	Final / BM	
Athlete	Event	Score	Seed	Opposition Score	Opposition Score	Opposition Score	Opposition Score	Opposition Score	Opposition Score	Rank
Maksim Kunda	Men's individual	646	48	Furukawa (JPN) (17); W 111 (19)–111 (18)	Petersson (SWE) (49); W 112–110	Serrano (MEX) (1); L 106–110	Did not advance			
Katsiaryna Muliuk	Women's individual	616	47	Sánchez (COL) (18); W 104–101	Chen L (CHN) (17); L 105–106	Did not advance				

== Athletics ==
Key

- Note–Ranks given for track events are within the athlete's heat only
- Q = Qualified for the next round
- q = Qualified for the next round as a fastest loser or, in field events, by position without achieving the qualifying target
- NR = National record
- N/A = Round not applicable for the event
- Bye = Athlete not required to compete in round

Men
Track & road events

Athlete	Event	Heat		Quarterfinal		Semifinal		Final	
Athlete	Event	Result	Rank	Result	Rank	Result	Rank	Result	Rank
Siarhei Charnou	20 km walk	—N/a						1:29:38	44
Andrei Hardzeyeu	Marathon	—N/a						DNF	
Maksim Lynsha	110 m hurdles	13.86	5	Did not advance					
Dzianis Simanovich	20 km walk	—N/a						1:23:53	28
Andrei Stsepanchuk	50 km walk	—N/a						4:14:09	43
Ivan Trotski	20 km walk	—N/a						1:22:55	22

Field events

Athlete	Event	Qualification		Final	
Athlete	Event	Distance	Position	Distance	Position
Yury Bialou	Shot put	20.12	11 q	20.06	9
Vadim Devyatovskiy	Hammer throw	76.95	9 q	81.61	(silver) ^{1}
Uladzimir Kazlou	Javelin throw	80.06	8 q	82.06	8
Pavel Lyzhyn	Shot put	20.36	7 q	20.98	4
Andrei Mikhnevich	Shot put	20.48	3 Q	~~21.05~~	DSQ^{2}
Dzmitry Platnitski	Triple jump	16.51	27	Did not advance	
Dzmitry Sivakou	Discus throw	61.75	15	Did not advance	
Valeriy Sviatokha	Hammer throw	74.41	17	Did not advance	
Ivan Tsikhan	Hammer throw	79.26	4 Q	81.51	(bronze) ^{1}

- 1 Ivan Tsikhan and Vadim Devyatovskiy were stripped of their medals due to doping. However, these medals were later reinstated after appeal to the CAS.
- 2 Andrei Mikhnevich originally claimed a bronze medal in the men's shot put, but it was later stripped due to doping violation.

Combined events – Decathlon

Athlete	Event	100 m	LJ	SP	HJ	400 m	110H	DT	PV	JT	1500 m	Final	Rank
Andrei Krauchanka	Result	10.96	7.61	14.39	2.11	47.30	14.21	44.58	5.00	60.23	4:27.47	8551	2nd place, silver medalist(s)
Andrei Krauchanka	Points	870	962	752	906	943	948	758	910	741	761	8551	2nd place, silver medalist(s)
Aliaksandr Parkhomenka	Result	11.29	6.99	15.49	1.93	50.71	15.06	45.27	4.70	64.60	4:45.17	7838	16
Aliaksandr Parkhomenka	Points	797	811	820	740	782	842	772	819	807	648	7838	16
Mikalai Shubianok	Result	11.31	6.86	14.88	1.99	50.02	14.52	45.80	4.60	62.10	4:38.14	7906	15
Mikalai Shubianok	Points	793	781	782	794	814	908	783	790	769	692	7906	15

Women
Track & road events

Athlete	Event	Heat		Quarterfinal		Semifinal		Final	
Athlete	Event	Result	Rank	Result	Rank	Result	Rank	Result	Rank
Elena Ginko	20 km walk	—N/a						DSQ	
Volha Krautsova	5000 m	15:21.85	9	—N/a				Did not advance	
Yulia Nestsiarenka	100 m	11.40	2 Q	11.14	4 q	11.26	5	Did not advance	
Katsiaryna Paplauskaya	100 m hurdles	13.39	7	—N/a		Did not advance			
Ryta Turava	20 km walk	—N/a						1:28:26	11
Sviatlana Usovich	800 m	2:00.42	4 q	—N/a		2:02.79	8	Did not advance	
Sniazhana Yurchanka	20 km walk	—N/a						1:35:33	33
Hanna Bahdanovich; Aksana Drahun; Yulia Nestsiarenka; Nastassia Shuliak	4 × 100 m relay	43.69	6	—N/a				Did not advance	
Anna Kozak; Iryna Khliustava; Ilona Usovich; Sviatlana Usovich; Yulyana Yushchanka*	4 × 400 m relay	3:22.78	3 Q	—N/a				3:21.85 NR	4

* Competed in the heats only

Field events

Athlete	Event	Qualification		Final	
Athlete	Event	Distance	Position	Distance	Position
Nadzeya Astapchuk	Shot put	19.08	6 Q	~~19.86~~	DSQ^{3}
Iryna Charnushenka-Stasiuk	Long jump	6.48	18	Did not advance	
Yanina Karolchyk-Pravalinskaya	Shot put	17.79	18	Did not advance	
Hanna Mazgunova	Discus throw	56.77	29	Did not advance	
Aksana Miankova	Hammer throw	69.77	11 q	~~76.34 OR~~	DSQ^{4}
Natallia Mikhnevich	Shot put	19.11	4 Q	~~20.28~~	DSQ^{5}
Maryna Novik	Javelin throw	56.10	31	Did not advance	
Darya Pchelnik	Hammer throw	71.30	8 q	73.65	4
Kseniya Pryiemka-Dziatsuk	Triple jump	13.08	31	Did not advance	
Natallia Shymchuk	Javelin throw	57.11	23	Did not advance	
Volha Siarheyenka	Long jump	6.25	32	Did not advance	
Maryia Smaliachkova	Hammer throw	69.22	13	Did not advance	
Iryna Yatchenko	Discus throw	62.26	3 Q	59.27	11
Ellina Zvereva	Discus throw	60.28	12 q	60.82	6

- 3 Nadzeya Astapchuk originally claimed a bronze medal in the women's shot put, but it was later stripped due to doping violation.
- 4 Aksana Miankova originally claimed a gold medal in the women's hammer throw, but it was later stripped due to doping violation.
- 5 Natallia Mikhnevich originally claimed a silver medal in the women's shot put, but it was later stripped due to doping violation.

Combined events – Heptathlon

Athlete	Event	100H	HJ	SP	200 m	LJ	JT	800 m	Final	Rank
Yana Maksimava	Result	14.71	1.74	13.60	25.94	NM	39.14	2:21.55	4806	34*
Yana Maksimava	Points	880	903	767	802	0	651	803	4806	34*

* The athlete who finished in second place, Lyudmila Blonska of Ukraine, tested positive for a banned substance. Both the A and the B tests were positive, therefore Blonska was stripped of her silver medal, and Maksimava moved up a position.

== Badminton ==
Athlete	Event	Round of 64	Round of 32	Round of 16	Quarterfinal	Semifinal	Final / BM	
Athlete	Event	Opposition Score	Opposition Score	Opposition Score	Opposition Score	Opposition Score	Opposition Score	Rank
Olga Konon	Women's singles	Xing Ay (SIN); W 21–19, 21–12	Tvrdy (SLO); W 21–17, 21–14	Xie Xf (CHN); L 16–21, 15–21	Did not advance			

== Basketball ==
=== Women's tournament ===
Roster

The following is the Belarus roster in the women's basketball tournament of the 2008 Summer Olympics.

Belarus women's national basketball team – 2008 Summer Olympics roster
Players
Coaches

Pos.	No.	Name	Age – Date of birth	Height	Club	Ctr.
PG	4	Volha Padabed	29 – April 24, 1979	5 ft 9 in (1.75 m)	SK Cesis	(Latvia)
SG	5	Olga Masilionene	28 – January 25, 1980	5 ft 11 in (1.8 m)	Gospic	(Croatia)
G/F	6	Katsiaryna Snytsina	22 – September 2, 1985	6 ft 2 in (1.88 m)	Dynamo-Energiya Novosibirsk	(Russia)
C	7	Viktoryia Hasper	20 – January 9, 1988	6 ft 4 in (1.93 m)	Chevakata Vologda	(Russia)
PG	8	Tatsiana Likhtarovich	20 – March 29, 1988	5 ft 10 in (1.78 m)	Olimpia Grodno	(Belarus)
PG	9	Natallia Anufryienka	23 – June 11, 1985	5 ft 9 in (1.75 m)	Olimpia Grodno	(Belarus)
F/C	10	Anastasiya Verameyenka	21 – July 10, 1987	6 ft 4 in (1.93 m)	Nadezhda Orenburg	(Russia)
C	11	Yelena Leuchanka	25 – April 30, 1983	6 ft 5 in (1.96 m)	UMMC Ekaterinburg	(Russia)
G	12	Natallia Marchanka	29 – May 19, 1979	5 ft 7 in (1.7 m)	Lotos VBW Clima Gdynia	(Poland)
G/F	13	Tatyana Troina	27 – June 30, 1981	6 ft 2 in (1.88 m)	Maccabi Ramat Hen	(Israel)
F	14	Nataliya Trafimava (C)	29 – June 16, 1979	6 ft 1 in (1.85 m)	Wisla Krakow	(Poland)
C	15	Marina Kress	27 – August 23, 1980	6 ft 4 in (1.93 m)	Extragusa	(Spain)

Head coach

- (Belarus) Anatoly Buyalski

Legend

- (C) Team captain
- Club – describes last
  club before the tournament
- Age – describes age
  on August 9, 2008

Group play

Pos	Team	Pld	W	L	PF	PA	PD	Pts	Qualification
1	Australia	5	5	0	424	319	+105	10	Quarterfinals
2	Russia	5	4	1	339	333	+6	9	Quarterfinals
3	Belarus	5	2	3	324	332	−8	7 (Note: Head-to-head record: Belarus 1–0 South Korea)	Quarterfinals
4	South Korea	5	2	3	327	360	−33	7	Quarterfinals
5	Latvia	5	1	4	334	387	−53	6 (Note: Head-to-head record: Latvia 1–0 Brazil)	
6	Brazil	5	1	4	337	354	−17	6	

Source: FIBA archive
Rules for classification: 1) points; 2) head-to-head points; 3) head-to-head goal average; 4) head-to-head number of points scored.
Notes:

9 August 2008
09:00

Report

Belarus	64–83	Australia
Scoring by quarter: 12–19, 16–25 , 22–21, 14–18
Pts: Leuchanka 13, Troina 13; Rebs: Leuchanka 10; Asts: Marchanka 2		Pts: Jackson 18; Rebs: Batkovic 12; Asts: Harrower 5

Wukesong Indoor Stadium, Beijing
Attendance: 11,083
Referees: Nikolaos Zavlanos (GRE)

11 August 2008
16:45

Report

Latvia	57–79	Belarus
Scoring by quarter: 20–21, 15–19, 14–20, 8–19
Pts: Baško 19; Rebs: Jansone, Kubliņa, Tamane 6 Asts: Eglīte 3		Pts: Leuchanka 22; Rebs: Verameyenka 9 Asts: Marchanka 5

Wukesong Indoor Stadium, Beijing
Attendance: 11,083
Referees: Ilija Belosevic (SRB)

13 August 2008
09:00

Report

Belarus	65–71	Russia
Scoring by quarter: 19–20, 8–15, 13–17, 25–19
Pts: Marchanka 16; Rebs: Leuchanka 12; Asts: Leuchanka 4		Pts: Stepanova 13; Rebs: Abrosimova 10; Asts: Korstin 2

Wukesong Indoor Stadium, Beijing
Attendance: 11,083
Referees: Eddie Rush (USA)

15 August 2008
22:15

Report

South Korea	53–63	Belarus
Scoring by quarter: 15–12, 13–21, 9–17, 16–13
Pts: Lee, Jung 10; Rebs: Lee, Beon 6 Asts: Beon 3		Pts: Snytsina 15; Rebs: Leuchanka 14; Asts: Maarchanka 5

Wukesong Indoor Stadium, Beijing
Attendance: 11,083
Referees: Nikolaos Pitsilkas (GRE)

17 August 2008
16:45

Report

Brazil	68–53	Belarus
Scoring by quarter: 20–12, 19–14, 10–12, 19–15
Pts: Santos 14; Rebs: Nascimento 10; Asts: Nascimento 3		Pts: Anufryienka, Leuchanka 10; Rebs: Verameyenka 10; Asts: Marchanka 4

Wukesong Indoor Stadium, Beijing
Attendance: 11,083
Referees: Juan Arteaga (ESP)

Quarterfinals

19 August 2008
14:30

Report

China	77–62	Belarus
Scoring by quarter: 19–13, 19–12, 18–18, 21–19
Pts: Miao 28; Rebs: Song, Chen, Sui 4 Asts: Miao 3		Pts: Troina 15; Rebs: Leuchanka 13; Asts: Padabed, Marchanka 5

Wukesong Indoor Stadium, Beijing
Attendance: 11,083
Referees: Fabio Facchini (ITA)

== Boxing ==
Belarus qualified four boxers for the Olympic boxing tournament. Nurudzinau, Magamedau, and Zuyeu each qualified for their weight classes in the first European qualifying event. Khatsigov qualified at the second European qualifying event.

Athlete	Event	Round of 32	Round of 16	Quarterfinals	Semifinals	Final	
Athlete	Event	Opposition Result	Opposition Result	Opposition Result	Opposition Result	Opposition Result	Rank
Khavazhi Khatsigov	Bantamweight	Gojan (MDA); L 1–1^{+}	Did not advance				
Mahamed Nurudzinau	Welterweight	Jackson (ISV); L 2–4	Did not advance				
Ramazan Magamedau	Light heavyweight	Yasser (EGY); L 10–10^{+}	Did not advance				
Viktar Zuyeu	Heavyweight	—N/a	Russo (ITA); L 1–7	Did not advance			

== Canoeing ==
=== Sprint ===
Men

Athlete	Event	Heats		Semifinals		Final	
Athlete	Event	Time	Rank	Time	Rank	Time	Rank
Aliaksandr Zhukovski	C-1 500 m	1:48.669	1 QF	Bye		1:49.092	5
Aliaksandr Zhukovski	C-1 1000 m	4:01.380	4 QS	3:58.851	3 Q	3:55.645	5
Aliaksandr Bahdanovich; Andrei Bahdanovich	C-2 1000 m	3:40.369	1 QF	Bye		3:36.365	1st place, gold medalist(s)
Vadzim Makhneu; Raman Piatrushenka	K-2 500 m	1:28.661	1 QF	Bye		1:30.005	3rd place, bronze medalist(s)
Aliaksei Abalmasau; Artur Litvinchuk; Vadzim Makhneu; Raman Piatrushenka	K-4 1000m	2:58.825	3 QF	Bye		2:55.714	1st place, gold medalist(s)

Women

Athlete	Event	Heats		Semifinals		Final	
Athlete	Event	Time	Rank	Time	Rank	Time	Rank
Tatsiana Fedarovich	K-1 500 m	1:57.881	8	Did not advance			

Qualification Legend: QS = Qualify to semi-final; QF = Qualify directly to final

== Cycling ==
=== Road ===
Athlete	Event	Time	Rank
Vasil Kiryienka	Men's time trial	1:06.12	21
Aleksandr Kuschynski	Men's road race	6:39:42	73
Kanstantsin Sivtsov	Men's road race	6:26:17	33
Aliaksandr Usau	Men's road race	6:49:59	83

=== Track ===
Sprint

Athlete	Event	Qualification		Round 1	Repechage 1	Quarterfinals	Semifinals	Final	
Athlete	Event	Time Speed (km/h)	Rank	Opposition Time Speed (km/h)	Opposition Time Speed (km/h)	Opposition Time Speed (km/h)	Opposition Time Speed (km/h)	Opposition Time Speed (km/h)	Rank
Natallia Tsylinskaya	Women's sprint	11:372; 63.313	7	Sanchez (FRA); L	Guerra (CUB); Tsukuda (JPN); W 11.871; 60.652	Guo S (CHN); L, L	Did not advance	5th place final Sanchez (FRA); Reed (USA); Krupeckaitė (LTU); L	6

Omnium

Athlete	Event	Points	Laps	Rank
Vasil Kiryienka	Men's points race	34	1	5

== Diving ==
Men

Athlete	Event	Preliminaries		Semifinals		Final	
Athlete	Event	Points	Rank	Points	Rank	Points	Rank
Sergei Kuchmasov	3 m springboard	399.40	25	Did not advance			
Vadim Kaptur	10 m platform	432.90	13 Q	420.55	14	Did not advance	
Aliaksandr Varlamau	10 m platform	406.60	21	Did not advance			

Women

Athlete	Event	Preliminaries		Semifinals		Final	
Athlete	Event	Points	Rank	Points	Rank	Points	Rank
Darya Romenskaya	3 m springboard	207.00	29	Did not advance			

== Equestrian ==
=== Dressage ===
Athlete	Horse	Event	Grand Prix		Grand Prix Special		Grand Prix Freestyle		Overall	
Athlete	Horse	Event	Score	Rank	Score	Rank	Score	Rank	Score	Rank
Iryna Lis	Redford	Individual	63.500	30	Did not advance					

=== Eventing ===
Athlete	Horse	Event	Dressage		Cross-country			Jumping						Total	
Athlete	Horse	Event	Dressage		Cross-country			Qualifier			Final			Total	
Athlete	Horse	Event	Penalties	Rank	Penalties	Total	Rank	Penalties	Total	Rank	Penalties	Total	Rank	Penalties	Rank
Viachaslau Poita	Energiya	Individual	59.10	56	75.60	114.70	58	31.00	165.70	54	Did not advance			165.70	54
Alena Tseliapushkina	Passat	Individual	77.40	67	59.60	137.00	59	30.00	167.00	55	Did not advance			167.00	55

== Fencing ==
Men

Athlete	Event	Round of 64	Round of 32	Round of 16	Quarterfinal	Semifinal	Final / BM	
Athlete	Event	Opposition Score	Opposition Score	Opposition Score	Opposition Score	Opposition Score	Opposition Score	Rank
Aliaksandr Buikevich	Individual sabre	Bye	Yakimenko (RUS); W 15–9	Limbach (GER); W 15–14	Covaliu (ROU); L 13–15	Did not advance		
Dmitri Lapkes	Individual sabre	Bye	Oh E-S (KOR); L 8–15	Did not advance				
Valery Pryiemka	Individual sabre	Talaat (EGY); W 15–7	Covaliu (ROU); L 9–15	Did not advance				
Aliaksandr Buikevich; Dmitri Lapkes; Valery Pryiemka	Team sabre	—N/a			Italy; L 39–45	Classification semi-final Egypt; W 45–22	5th place final China; W 45–39	5

== Gymnastics ==
=== Artistic ===
Men
Team

Athlete	Event	Qualification								Final							
Athlete	Event	Apparatus						Total	Rank	Apparatus						Total	Rank
Athlete	Event	F	PH	R	V	PB	HB	Total	Rank	F	PH	R	V	PB	HB	Total	Rank
Aliaksei Ignatovich	Team	—N/a	15.075	—N/a			13.000	—N/a		Did not advance							
Dzmitry Kaspiarovich	Team	14.675	—N/a	15.275	16.500 Q	15.525	14.250	—N/a		Did not advance							
Ihar Kazloŭ	Team	14.025	12.675	14.925	15.275	—N/a				Did not advance							
Dzianis Savenkov	Team	14.525	13.525	13.750	15.675	14.800	14.750	87.025	33	Did not advance							
Dzmitry Savitski	Team	14.375	14.525	15.175	16.300	15.700	14.575	90.650	12 Q	Did not advance							
Aliaksandr Tsarevich	Team	14.300	14.450	—N/a		15.175	14.850	—N/a		Did not advance							
Total	Team	57.875	57.575	59.125	63.750	61.200	58.425	375.950	10	Did not advance							

Individual finals

Athlete	Event	Apparatus						Total	Rank
Athlete	Event	F	PH	R	V	PB	HB	Total	Rank
Dzmitry Kaspiarovich	Vault	—N/a			16.050	—N/a		16.050	6
Dzmitry Savitski	All-around	13.725	13.750	15.300	15.900	13.400	10.100	82.175	23

Women

Athlete	Event	Qualification						Final					
Athlete	Event	Apparatus				Total	Rank	Apparatus				Total	Rank
Athlete	Event	F	V	UB	BB	Total	Rank	F	V	UB	BB	Total	Rank
Nastassia Marachkovskaya	All-around	14.025	15.275	12.200	13.600	55.100	48	Did not advance					

=== Rhythmic ===
Athlete	Event	Qualification						Final					
Athlete	Event	Rope	Hoop	Clubs	Ribbon	Total	Rank	Rope	Hoop	Clubs	Ribbon	Total	Rank
Inna Zhukova	Individual	17.850	18.375	17.300	17.425	70.950	4 Q	18.125	18.125	17.850	17.825	71.925	2nd place, silver medalist(s)

Athlete	Event	Qualification				Final			
Athlete	Event	5 ropes	3 hoops 2 clubs	Total	Rank	5 ropes	3 hoops 2 clubs	Total	Rank
Olesya Babushkina; Anastasia Ivankova; Zinaida Lunina; Glafira Martinovich; Ksenia Sankovich; Alina Tumilovich	Team	17.525	17.425	34.950	1 Q	17.625	17.275	34.900	3rd place, bronze medalist(s)

=== Trampoline ===
Athlete	Event	Qualification		Final	
Athlete	Event	Score	Rank	Score	Rank
Tatsiana Piatrenia	Women's	63.80	9	Did not advance	

== Judo ==
Men

Athlete	Event	Preliminary	Round of 32	Round of 16	Quarterfinals	Semifinals	Repechage 1	Repechage 2	Repechage 3	Final / BM	
Athlete	Event	Opposition Result	Opposition Result	Opposition Result	Opposition Result	Opposition Result	Opposition Result	Opposition Result	Opposition Result	Opposition Result	Rank
Kanstantsin Siamionau	−73 kg	—N/a	Meridja (ALG); W 0102–0010	Mammadli (AZE); L 0001–1001	Did not advance		van Tichelt (BEL); L 0020–1021	Did not advance			
Siarhei Shundzikau	−81 kg	Bye	Kim J-B (KOR); L 0000–0011	Did not advance			Krawczyk (POL); L 0010–0011	Did not advance			
Andrei Kazusionak	−90 kg	—N/a	Ghomi (IRI); W 1110–0000	Izumi (JPN); W 1000–0000	Pershin (RUS); L 0000–1010	Did not advance	Bye	Rosati (ARG); W 1000–0000	Mesbah (EGY); L 0001–1001	Did not advance	
Yury Rybak	+100 kg	Ceraj (SLO); W 1000–0000	Roudaki (IRI); L 0001–1001	Did not advance							

== Modern pentathlon ==
Athlete	Event	Shooting (10 m air pistol)			Fencing (épée one touch)			Swimming (200 m freestyle)			Riding (show jumping)			Running (3000 m)			Total points	Final rank
Athlete	Event	Points	Rank	MP Points	Results	Rank	MP points	Time	Rank	MP points	Penalties	Rank	MP points	Time	Rank	MP Points	Total points	Final rank
Yahor Lapo	Men's	178	24	1072	17–18	19	808	2:05.62	18	1296	DNF	=35	0	9:41.17	22	1076	4252	35
Dzmitry Meliakh	Men's	186	6	1168	11–24	35	664	2:03.03	9	1324	84	6	1116	9:41.97	23	1076	5348	12
Hanna Arkhipenka	Women's	180	13	1096	16–20	=22	784	2:27.06	30	1156	56	15	1144	10:53.23	21	1108	5288	22
Anastasiya Samusevich	Women's	187	3	1180	19–17	=14	856	2:29.64	33	1128	28	5	1172	10:04.46	1	1304	5640	3rd place, bronze medalist(s)

== Rowing ==
Men

Athlete	Event	Heats		Repechage		Semifinals		Final	
Athlete	Event	Time	Rank	Time	Rank	Time	Rank	Time	Rank
Dzianis Mihal; Stanislau Shcharbachenia	Double sculls	6:27.18	2 SA/B	Bye		6:32.76	6 FB	6:32.59	7
Andrei Dzemyanenka; Vadzim Lialin; Yauheni Nosau; Aliaksandr Kazubouski	Four	6:12.53	5 R	6:00.44	3 SA/B	6:02.79	5 FB	6:12.54	12
Kiryl Lemiashkevich; Aliaksandr Novikau; Valery Radzevich; Pavel Shurmei	Quadruple sculls	5:43.73	3 SA/B	Bye		6:06.80	6 FB	5:50.74	11

Women

Athlete	Event	Heats		Repechage		Quarterfinals		Semifinals		Final	
Athlete	Event	Time	Rank	Time	Rank	Time	Rank	Time	Rank	Time	Rank
Ekaterina Karsten-Khodotovitch	Single sculls	7:40.03	1 QF	—N/a		7:25.74	1 SA/B	7:22.86	1 FA	7:23.98	3rd place, bronze medalist(s)
Yuliya Bichyk; Natallia Helakh	Pair	7:24.47	1 FA	Bye		—N/a				7:22.91	3rd place, bronze medalist(s)

Qualification Legend: FA=Final A (medal); FB=Final B (non-medal); FC=Final C (non-medal); FD=Final D (non-medal); FE=Final E (non-medal); FF=Final F (non-medal); SA/B=Semifinals A/B; SC/D=Semifinals C/D; SE/F=Semifinals E/F; QF=Quarterfinals; R=Repechage

== Sailing ==
Men

Athlete	Event	Race											Net points	Final rank
Athlete	Event	1	2	3	4	5	6	7	8	9	10	M*	Net points	Final rank
Mikalai Zhukavets	RS:X	27	23	26	24	29	21	~~32~~	26	26	27	EL	229	28
Sergei Desukevich; Pavel Logunov	470	~~29~~	27	16	26	16	2	12	17	16	27	EL	159	21

Women

Athlete	Event	Race											Net points	Final rank
Athlete	Event	1	2	3	4	5	6	7	8	9	10	M*	Net points	Final rank
Tatiana Drozdovskaya	Laser Radial	12	24	17	17	10	22	11	15	~~26~~	CAN	EL	119	20

M = Medal race; EL = Eliminated – did not advance into the medal race; CAN = Race cancelled;

== Shooting ==
Men

Athlete	Event	Qualification		Final	
Athlete	Event	Points	Rank	Points	Rank
Vitali Bubnovich	10 m air rifle	592	18	Did not advance	
Vitali Bubnovich	50 m rifle 3 positions	1161	29	Did not advance	
Yury Dauhapolau	10 m air pistol	577	22	Did not advance	
Yury Dauhapolau	50 m pistol	558	12	Did not advance	
Andrei Gerachtchenko	Skeet	109	34	Did not advance	
Petr Litvinchuk	50 m rifle prone	593	17	Did not advance	
Kanstantsin Lukashyk	10 m air pistol	575	27	Did not advance	
Kanstantsin Lukashyk	50 m pistol	558	11	Did not advance	
Sergei Martynov	50 m rifle prone	595	6 Q	698.3	8
Sergei Martynov	50 m rifle 3 positions	1156	34	Did not advance	

Women

Athlete	Event	Qualification		Final	
Athlete	Event	Points	Rank	Points	Rank
Viktoria Chaika	10 m air pistol	384	5 Q	482.0	4
Viktoria Chaika	25 m pistol	581	13	Did not advance	
Zhanna Shapialevich	10 m air pistol	368	42	Did not advance	
Zhanna Shapialevich	25 m pistol	569	38	Did not advance	

== Swimming ==
Men

Athlete	Event	Heat		Semifinal		Final	
Athlete	Event	Time	Rank	Time	Rank	Time	Rank
Yauheni Lazuka	100 m butterfly	53.54	43	Did not advance			
Stanislau Neviarouski	100 m freestyle	50.14	44	Did not advance			
Andrei Radzionau	50 m freestyle	22.65	36	Did not advance			
Pavel Sankovich	100 m backstroke	55.39	29	Did not advance			
Viktar Vabishchevich	100 m breaststroke	1:03.29	49	Did not advance			
Yauheni Lazuka; Stanislau Neviarouski; Pavel Sankovich; Viktar Vabishchevich	4 × 100 m medley relay	3:39.39	16	—N/a		Did not advance	

Women

Athlete	Event	Heat		Semifinal		Final	
Athlete	Event	Time	Rank	Time	Rank	Time	Rank
Aliaksandra Herasimenia	50 m freestyle	25.07	16 Q	24.72	8 Q	24.77	8
Aliaksandra Herasimenia	100 m freestyle	54.52	12 Q	55.31	14	Did not advance	
Inna Kapishina	100 m breaststroke	1:10.15	27	Did not advance			
Inna Kapishina	200 m breaststroke	2:27.34	17	Did not advance			
Sviatlana Khakhlova	50 m freestyle	25.27	20	Did not advance			

== Synchronized swimming ==
Athlete	Event	Technical routine		Free routine (preliminary)			Free routine (final)		
Athlete	Event	Points	Rank	Points	Total (technical + free)	Rank	Points	Total (technical + free)	Rank
Katsiaryna Kulpo; Nastassia Parfenava	Duet	42.667	17	42.667	85.334	19	Did not advance		

== Table tennis ==
Athlete	Event	Preliminary round	Round 1	Round 2	Round 3	Round 4	Quarterfinals	Semifinals	Final / BM	
Athlete	Event	Opposition Result	Opposition Result	Opposition Result	Opposition Result	Opposition Result	Opposition Result	Opposition Result	Opposition Result	Rank
Vladimir Samsonov	Men's singles	Bye			Süß (GER); W 4–0	Persson (SWE); L 3–4	Did not advance			
Tatyana Kostromina	Women's singles	Bye	Zhang M (CAN); W 4–0	Li Q (POL); W 4–2	Lin L (HKG); L 0–4	Did not advance				
Veronika Pavlovich	Women's singles	Bye	Hadacova (CZE); L 2–4	Did not advance						
Viktoria Pavlovich	Women's singles	Bye		Samara (ROU); W 4–1	Zhang Yn (CHN); L 0–4	Did not advance				

== Tennis ==
Athlete	Event	Round of 64	Round of 32	Round of 16	Quarterfinals	Semifinals	Final / BM	
Athlete	Event	Opposition Score	Opposition Score	Opposition Score	Opposition Score	Opposition Score	Opposition Score	Rank
Max Mirnyi	Men's singles	Kiefer (GER); L 3–6, 1–6	Did not advance					
Victoria Azarenka	Women's singles	Perebiynis (UKR); W 6-4, 5–7, 6–4	Dellacqua (AUS); W 6–2, 6–2	V Williams (USA); L 3–6, 2–6	Did not advance			
Olga Govortsova	Women's singles	S Williams (USA); L 3–6, 1–6	Did not advance					
Victoria Azarenka; Tatiana Poutchek	Women's doubles	—N/a	Ani / Kanepi (EST); W 6–2, 6–2	Davenport / Huber (USA); L 4–6, 6–4, 3–6	Did not advance			
Olga Govortsova; Darya Kustova	Women's doubles	—N/a	Peng S / Sun Tt (CHN); W 7–6, 7–6	A Bondarenko / K Bondarenko (UKR); L 3–6, 1–6	Did not advance			

== Weightlifting ==
Men

Athlete	Event	Snatch		Clean & Jerk		Total	Rank
Athlete	Event	Result	Rank	Result	Rank	Total	Rank
Vitali Dzerbianiou	−56 kg	127	6	~~140~~	DNF	127	DNF
Henadzy Makhveyenia	−62 kg	128	12	150	12	278	10
Siarhei Lahun	−77 kg	157	10	192	6	349	10
Andrei Rybakou	−85 kg	185 OR	1	209	2	394 WR	DSQ
Vadzim Straltsou	−85 kg	~~170~~	DNF	—	—	—	DNF
Andrei Aramnau	−105 kg	200 WR	1	236 WR	1	436 WR	1st place, gold medalist(s)

Women

Athlete	Event	Snatch		Clean & Jerk		Total	Rank
Athlete	Event	Result	Rank	Result	Rank	Total	Rank
Nastassia Novikava	−53 kg	95	2	118	3	213	DSQ
Hanna Batsiushka	−69 kg	105	4	120	5	225	5
Iryna Kulesha	−75 kg	118	3	137	4	255	DSQ
Yuliya Novakovich	−75 kg	110	4	127	7	237	7

== Wrestling ==
Key:

- VT - Victory by Fall.
- PP - Decision by Points - the loser with technical points.
- PO - Decision by Points - the loser without technical points.

Men's freestyle

Athlete	Event	Qualification	Round of 16	Quarterfinal	Semifinal	Repechage 1	Repechage 2	Final / BM	
Athlete	Event	Opposition Result	Opposition Result	Opposition Result	Opposition Result	Opposition Result	Opposition Result	Opposition Result	Rank
Rizvan Gadzhiev	−55 kg	Pérez (CUB); W 3–0 ^{PO}	Mansurov (UZB); L 1–3 ^{PP}	Did not advance					7
Albert Batyrov	−66 kg	Bye	Yang C-S (PRK); W 3–1 ^{PP}	Stadnik (UKR); L 1–3 ^{PP}	Did not advance	Bye	Kumar (IND); L 1–3 ^{PP}	Did not advance	9
Murad Gaidarov	−74 kg	Bye	Chamsulvarayev (AZE); W 3–1 ^{PP}	Saghirashvili (GEO); W 3–0 ^{PO}	Tigiev (UZB); L 0–3 ^{PO}	Bye		Ştefan (ROU); W 3–1 ^{PP}	2nd place, silver medalist(s)

- Murad Gaidarov originally finished third, but in November 2016, he was promoted to second place due to disqualification of Soslan Tigiev.

Men's Greco-Roman

Athlete	Event	Qualification	Round of 16	Quarterfinal	Semifinal	Repechage 1	Repechage 2	Final / BM	
Athlete	Event	Opposition Result	Opposition Result	Opposition Result	Opposition Result	Opposition Result	Opposition Result	Opposition Result	Rank
Yury Dubinin	−60 kg	Bye	Jung J-H (KOR); L 0–3 ^{PO}	Did not advance					20
Mikhail Siamionau	−66 kg	Kazakevič (LTU); W 3–1 ^{PP}	Mohammadi (IRI); W 3–1 ^{PP}	Guénot (FRA); L 1–3 ^{PP}	Did not advance	Bye	Milián (CUB); W 3–1 ^{PP}	Bayakhmetov (KAZ); W 3–1 ^{PP}	3rd place, bronze medalist(s)
Aleh Mikhalovich	−74 kg	Bye	Kwit (POL); W 3–1 ^{PP}	Melyoshin (KAZ); W 3–1 ^{PP}	Chang Yx (CHN); L 1–3 ^{PP}	Bye		Yanakiev (BUL); L 1–3 ^{PP}	5
Siarhei Artsiukhin	−120 kg	Bye	López (CUB); L 1–3 ^{PP}	Did not advance		Bye	Patrikeyev (ARM); L 1–3 ^{PP}	Did not advance	11

Women's freestyle

Athlete	Event	Qualification	Round of 16	Quarterfinal	Semifinal	Repechage 1	Repechage 2	Final / BM	
Athlete	Event	Opposition Result	Opposition Result	Opposition Result	Opposition Result	Opposition Result	Opposition Result	Opposition Result	Rank
Alena Filipava	−55 kg	—N/a	Smirnova (KAZ); L 1–3 ^{PP}	Did not advance					13
Volha Khilko	−63 kg	Bye	Michalik (POL); L 0–5 ^{VT}	Did not advance					12
