= Fencing at the 2008 Summer Olympics – Men's team sabre =

Men's team sabre at the Games of the XXIX Olympiad
- Venue: Olympic Green Convention Centre
- Date: 17 August 2008
- Competitors: 25 from 8 nations

Medalists
1st place, gold medalist(s)		Nicolas Lopez; Julien Pillet; Boris Sanson	France
2nd place, silver medalist(s)		Tim Morehouse; Jason Rogers; Keeth Smart; James Williams	United States
3rd place, bronze medalist(s)		Aldo Montano; Diego Occhiuzzi; Giampiero Pastore; Luigi Tarantino	Italy

The men's team sabre fencing competition at the 2008 Summer Olympics in Beijing took place on August 17 at the Olympic Green Convention Centre.

The team sabre competition consisted of a three-round single-elimination bracket with a bronze medal match between the two semifinal losers and classification semifinals and finals for 5th to 8th places. Teams consist of three members each. Matches consist of nine bouts, with every fencer on one team facing each fencer on the other team. Scoring carried over between bouts with a total of 45 touches being the team goal. Bouts lasted until one team reached the target multiple of 5 touches. For example, if the first bout ended with a score of 5–3, that score would remain into the next bout and the second bout would last until one team reached 10 touches. Bouts also had a maximum time of three minutes each; if the final bout ended before either team reached 45 touches, the team leading at that point won. A tie at that point would result in an additional one-minute sudden-death time period. This sudden-death period was further modified by the selection of a draw-winner beforehand; if neither fencer scored a touch during the minute, the predetermined draw-winner won the bout.

== Draw ==
=== Finals ===
Quarterfinals
1	France	45
8	Egypt	31
5	Belarus	39
4	Italy	45
3	Russia	45
6	China	36
7	United States	45
2	Hungary	44

Semifinals
1	France	45
4	Italy	41
3	Russia	44
7	United States	45

Finals
1	France	45
7	United States	37
Third place
4	Italy	45
3	Russia	44

=== Classification 5- 8 ===
Placement 5-8
8	Egypt	22
5	Belarus	45
6	China	45
2	Hungary	38

Placement 5-6
5	Belarus	45
6	China	39
Placement 7-8
8	Egypt	25
2	Hungary	45

== Final classification ==
Rank	Team	Athlete
1st place, gold medalist(s)	France	Julien Pillet; Boris Sanson; Nicolas Lopez
2nd place, silver medalist(s)	United States	Tim Morehouse; Jason Rogers; Keeth Smart; James Williams
3rd place, bronze medalist(s)	Italy	Aldo Montano; Luigi Tarantino; Giampiero Pastore; Diego Occhiuzzi
4	Russia	Nikolay Kovalev; Stanislav Pozdnyakov; Aleksey Yakimenko
5	Belarus	Aliaksandr Buikevich; Valery Pryiemka; Dmitri Lapkes
6	China	Huang Yaojiang; Zhou Hanming; Wang Jingzhi; Zhong Man
7	Hungary	Balázs Lontay; Zsolt Nemcsik; Áron Szilágyi; Tamás Decsi
8	Egypt	Mahmoud Samir; Gamal Fathy; Shadi Talaat; Tamim Ghazy
