= Hagar Badran =

Egyptian synchronized swimmer

Personal information
- Birth name: Hagar Badran
- Nationality: Egyptian
- Born: 20 May 1989 (age 36); Egypt

Sport
- Country: Egypt
- Sport: Synchronized swimming
- Event: Team

Hagar Badran (Arabic: هاجر بدران; born 20 May 1989) is an Egyptian synchronized swimmer who competed in the 2008 Summer Olympics.

== Synchronised Swimming ==
Badran was born in Egypt on 20 May 1989.

Badran is a synchronised swimmer, who was selected to represent Egypt at the 2008 Olympic Games.

Badran competed in the 2008 Summer Olympics in synchronised swimming. She competed in the Team event alongside team-mates Reem Abdalazem, Aziza Abdelfattah, Lamyaa Badawi, Dalia El-Gebaly, Shaza El-Sayed, Youmna Khallaf, Mai Mohamed and Nouran Saleh. She came 8th in Technical Team with a score of 39.750, and came 8th in Free Team with a score of 41.083.
