= Table tennis at the 2008 Summer Olympics – Men's singles =

Table tennis – Men's singles at the Games of the XXIX Olympiad
- Venue: Peking University Gymnasium
- Date: August 19 to August 23, 2008
- Competitors: 77 from 44 nations

Medalists
1st place, gold medalist(s)		Ma Lin	China
2nd place, silver medalist(s)		Wang Hao	China
3rd place, bronze medalist(s)		Wang Liqin	China

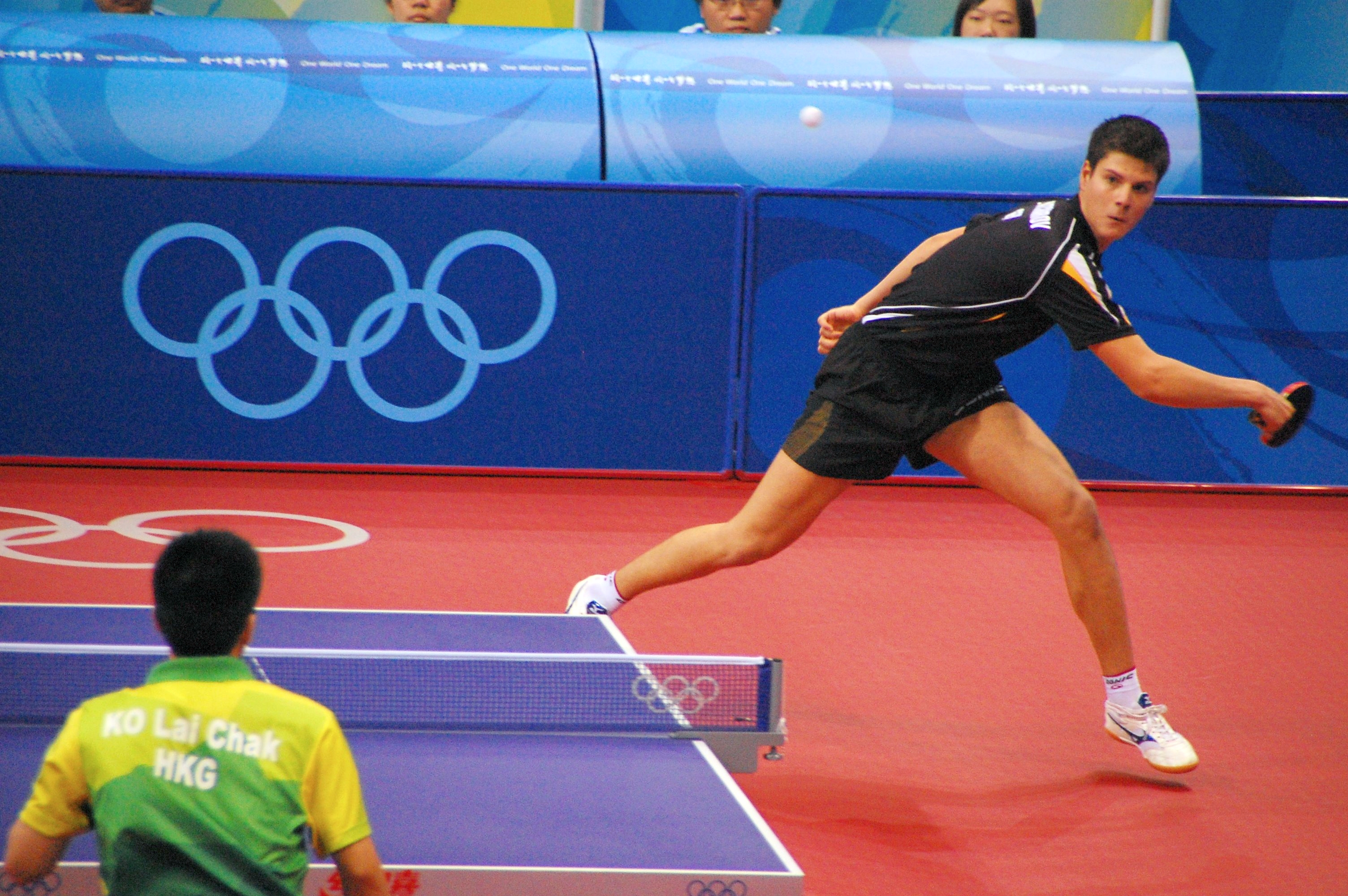
Dimitrij Ovtcharov met Ko Lai Chak in the fourth round

The Men's singles table tennis event was a part of the Table Tennis program and took place at the Peking University Gymnasium. The tournament started on August 19 and the finals took place on August 23.

77 athletes from 44 countries took part in the men's singles event. The tournament was a single elimination tournament with a third place playoff played between the two losing semi-finalists. The top 16 seeds in the tournament received a bye to the third round. Seeds 17 through 32 received a bye to the second round, seeds 33 to 51 received a bye to the first round and seeds 52 to 77 contested the preliminary round.

== Schedule ==
All times are China Standard Time (UTC+8).

Dates	Start time	Round
August 19	10:00	Preliminary round
August 19	13:00	First round
August 19	14:30	First round
August 19	18:45	First round
August 19	20:15	First round
August 20	11:00	Second round
August 20	14:00	Second round
August 20	19:00	Second round
August 20	22:00	Second round
August 21	12:00	Third round
August 21	20:00	Fourth round
August 22	13:30	Quarterfinals
August 23	10:00	Semifinals
August 23	19:30	Bronze medal match
August 23	20:30	Gold medal match

== Seeds ==
Seeds for the draw of the Olympics were based on the ITTF world ranking list published on July 1, 2008. The top 16 seeded players qualified directly to the third round.

1. Wang Hao (CHN) (final, silver medalist)
2. Ma Lin (CHN) (champion, gold medalist)
3. Wang Liqin (CHN) (semifinals, bronze medalist)
4. Vladimir Samsonov (BLR) (fourth round)
5. Timo Boll (GER) (fourth round)
6. Ryu Seung-min (KOR) (third round)
7. Chuang Chih-yuan (TPE) (third round)
8. Li Ching (HKG) (fourth round)
9. Cheung Yuk (HKG) (third round)
10. Gao Ning (SIN) (third round)
11. Dimitrij Ovtcharov (GER) (fourth round)
12. Oh Sang-eun (KOR) (quarterfinals)
13. Werner Schlager (AUT) (fourth round)
14. Kalinikos Kreanga (GRE) (fourth round)
15. Kan Yo (JPN) (fourth round)
16. Michael Maze (DEN) (third round)

The players ranked from 17 to 32 qualified directly to the second round.

17. Adrian Crișan (ROU) (third round)
18. Jun Mizutani (JPN) (third round)
19. Chiang Peng-lung (TPE) (second round)
20. Yoon Jae-young (KOR) (third round)
21. Jean-Michel Saive (BEL) (second round)
22. Alexei Smirnov (RUS) (third round)
23. Ko Lai Chak (HKG) (quarterfinals)
24. Zoran Primorac (CRO) (quarterfinals)
25. Jörgen Persson (SWE) (Semifinals, fourth place)
26. Yang Zi (SIN) (fourth round)
27. He Zhiwen (ESP) (second round)
28. Chen Weixing (AUT) (third round)
29. Christian Süß (GER) (third round)
30. Bojan Tokič (SLO) (third round)
31. Tan Ruiwu (CRO) (quarterfinals)
32. Petr Korbel (CZE) (second round)

== Draw ==
=== Finals ===
Semifinals
1	Wang Hao (CHN)	11	11	9	11	11
25	Jörgen Persson (SWE)	9	9	11	7	9
3	Wang Liqin (CHN)	5	9	9	12	11	8
2	Ma Lin (CHN)	11	11	11	10	3	11

Gold medal match
1	Wang Hao (CHN) (silver)	9	9	11	7	9
2	Ma Lin (CHN) (gold)	11	11	6	11	11
Bronze medal match
25	Jörgen Persson (SWE)	11	2	5	9
3	Wang Liqin (CHN) (bronze)	13	11	11	11

=== Top half ===
==== Section 1 ====
Second round
28	Chen W (AUT)	11	14	11	8	12
47	Achanta SK (IND)	5	12	2	11	10
22	A Smirnov (RUS)	11	5	11	14	11
64	Doan KQ (VIE)	3	11	4	12	8
17	A Crisan (ROU)	11	11	11	9	11
41	Lin J (DOM)	4	2	7	11	6
23	Ko LC (HKG)	11	7	11	10	11	4	11
38	P Gionis (GRE)	5	11	4	12	8	11	4

Third round
1	Wang H (CHN)	11	11	11	11
28	Chen W (AUT)	7	7	5	5
15	Y Kan (JPN)	9	11	11	14	17
22	A Smirnov (RUS)	11	8	9	12	15
11	D Ovtcharov (GER)	8	7	11	11	11	10	11
17	A Crisan (ROU)	11	11	7	9	6	12	8
6	Ryu S-m (KOR)	7	8	6	11	11	10
23	Ko LC (HKG)	11	11	11	4	5	12

Fourth round
1	Wang H (CHN)	11	9	11	11	11
15	Y Kan (JPN)	6	11	8	5	4
11	D Ovtcharov (GER)	4	7	4	11	1
23	Ko LC (HKG)	11	11	11	1	11

Quarterfinals
1	Wang H (CHN)	11	8	11	11	11
23	Ko LC (HKG)	7	11	6	7	9

==== Section 2 ====
Second round
26	Yang Z (SIN)	11	6	2	11	11	11
48	M Freitas (POR)	4	11	11	3	9	6
24	Z Primorac (CRO)	12	11	6	11	5	11
34	R Gardos (AUT)	10	8	11	5	11	9
25	J Persson (SWE)	11	8	12	8	11	11
37	A Karakašević (SRB)	8	11	10	11	8	7
29	C Süß (GER)	11	4	11	11	11
49	J Jakab (HUN)	7	11	8	8	8

Third round
7	Chuang C-y (TPE)	12	11	8	11	11	7	10
26	Yang Z (SIN)	14	7	11	7	5	11	12
16	M Maze (DEN)	8	11	10	12	7	11
24	Z Primorac (CRO)	11	9	12	10	11	13
9	Cheung Y (HKG)	9	7	4	11	2
25	J Persson (SWE)	11	11	11	9	11
4	V Samsonov (BLR)	15	11	11	11
29	C Süß (GER)	13	6	9	4

Fourth round
26	Yang Z (SIN)	7	7	11	11	7	6
24	Z Primorac (CRO)	11	11	4	8	11	11
25	J Persson (SWE)	7	8	11	11	11	12	11
4	V Samsonov (BLR)	11	11	9	13	7	10	9

Quarterfinals
24	Z Primorac (CRO)	11	6	8	12	9
25	J Persson (SWE)	7	11	11	14	11

=== Bottom half ===
==== Section 3 ====
Second round
32	P Korbel (CZE)	9	9	11	4	12	8
33	L Błaszczyk (POL)	11	11	7	11	10	11
20	Yoon J-y (KOR)	4	7	11	10	11	11	11
62	W Henzell (AUS)	11	11	9	12	5	7	4
31	Tan R (CRO)	7	11	11	11	11
43	S Kishikawa (JPN)	11	9	4	4	3
27	He ZW (ESP)	9	11	11	7	10	8
53	Jang S-m (PRK)	11	8	9	11	12	11

Third round
3	Wang L (CHN)	11	11	11	11
33	L Błaszczyk (POL)	2	6	7	8
13	W Schlager (AUT)	10	11	6	11	9	11	11
20	Yoon J-y (KOR)	12	8	11	4	11	6	8
10	Gao N (SIN)	6	12	4	7
31	Tan R (CRO)	11	14	11	11
8	Li C (HKG)	11	11	11	9	11
53	Jang S-m (PRK)	4	9	8	11	8

Fourth round
3	Wang L (CHN)	11	11	11	11
13	W Schlager (AUT)	6	4	8	2
31	Tan R (CRO)	9	11	10	11	13	11
8	Li C (HKG)	11	6	12	8	11	5

Quarterfinals
3	Wang L (CHN)	11	11	11	11
31	Tan R (CRO)	7	5	8	8

==== Section 4 ====
Second round
19	Chiang P-l (TPE)	7	11	8	11	4	10
52	Kim H-b (PRK)	11	8	11	7	11	12
21	J-M Saive (BEL)	8	7	11	11	3	10
56	S Toriola (NGR)	11	11	8	9	11	12
18	J Mizutani (JPN)	11	7	15	7	8	11	11
35	D Eloi (FRA)	9	11	13	11	11	8	1
30	B Tokič (SLO)	14	6	5	11	11	8	11
55	M Bobocica (ITA)	12	11	11	8	9	11	6

Third round
5	T Boll (GER)	13	11	11	10	11
52	Kim H-b (PRK)	11	3	4	12	8
12	Oh S-e (KOR)	12	15	11	11	9	9	11
56	S Toriola (NGR)	14	13	6	5	11	11	7
14	K Kreanga (GRE)	9	11	11	11	11
18	J Mizutani (JPN)	11	9	4	8	3
2	Ma L (CHN)	11	11	11	9	11
30	B Tokič (SLO)	5	6	8	11	5

Fourth round
5	T Boll (GER)	9	4	9	11	4
12	Oh S-e (KOR)	11	11	11	8	11
14	K Kreanga (GRE)	5	5	3	7
2	Ma L (CHN)	11	11	11	11

Quarterfinals
12	Oh S-e (KOR)	3	5	9	10
2	Ma L (CHN)	11	11	11	12

== Preliminary rounds ==
=== Top half ===
==== Section 1 ====
Preliminary round
59	A Carneros (ESP)	11	12	11	9	8	11
74	A Massaad (EGY)	9	10	8	11	11	8
64	Doan KQ (VIE)	11	11	12	11
73	D Zalcberg (AUS)	8	7	10	5
63	G Tsuboi (BRA)	11	11	10	11	7	9	12
68	P Peter-Paul (CAN)	7	6	12	7	11	11	10

First round
47	Achanta SK (IND)	6	12	11	9	11	11
59	A Carneros (ESP)	11	10	8	11	6	7
36	C Legout (FRA)	12	7	6	11	9	12
64	Doan KQ (VIE)	10	11	11	6	11	14
41	Lin J (DOM)	2	13	11	11	12
50	T Apolonia (POR)	11	11	4	5	10
38	P Gionis (GRE)	11	11	11	11
63	G Tsuboi (BRA)	7	3	5	5

==== Section 2 ====
Preliminary round
61	E-S Lashin (EGY)	11	9	11	11	13	17
65	P Tabachnik (ARG)	4	11	13	4	11	15
57	C Zeng (TUR)	10	11	11	8	12	11
66	M Merotohun (NGR)	12	5	8	11	10	9

First round
48	M Freitas (POR)	10	11	11	11	11
61	E-S Lashin (EGY)	12	4	8	8	6
34	R Gardos (AUT)	6	8	9	11	11	11	11
51	Ri C-g (PRK)	11	11	11	9	1	5	9
37	A Karakašević (SRB)	11	13	11	9	11
57	C Zeng (TUR)	8	11	7	11	1
39	P Chila (FRA)	11	12	11	7	1	8	9
49	J Jakab (HUN)	7	10	9	11	11	11	11

=== Bottom half ===
==== Section 3 ====
Preliminary round
60	Kou L (UKR)	11	9	8	6	9
71	S Saka (CGO)	5	11	11	11	11
62	W Henzell (AUS)	8	11	11	11	11
76	I Khourta (ALG)	11	3	2	5	8
58	Zhang P (CAN)	11	11	12	11
70	D St Louis (TRI)	6	7	10	4
53	Jang S-m (PRK)	11	11	11	11
77	M Aguirre (PAR)	7	3	8	3

First round
33	L Błaszczyk (POL)	11	11	13	11
71	S Saka (CGO)	9	3	11	2
40	J Lundqvist (SWE)	13	9	11	11	10	3
62	W Henzell (AUS)	15	11	8	5	12	11
43	S Kishikawa (JPN)	11	9	11	8	11	11
58	Zhang P (CAN)	9	11	6	11	5	9
46	Liu S (ARG)	9	11	11	4	9	11
53	Jang S-m (PRK)	11	9	5	11	11	13

==== Section 4 ====
Preliminary round
52	Kim H-b (PRK)	11	9	6	11	11	11
69	I Al-Hasan (KUW)	7	11	11	5	9	9
56	S Toriola (NGR)	8	11	2	11	9	11	11
67	D Zhuang (USA)	11	8	11	6	11	7	8
54	A Saleh (EGY)	11	11	10	11	11
75	K Davis (AUS)	7	6	12	7	8
55	M Bobocica (ITA)	11	10	11	9	11	12
72	A Norouzi (IRI)	7	12	6	11	4	10

First round
44	T Monteiro (BRA)	6	9	6	11	5
52	Kim H-b (PRK)	11	11	11	7	11
42	J Monteiro (POR)	11	7	7	11	9	11	7
56	S Toriola (NGR)	5	11	11	5	11	9	11
35	D Eloi (FRA)	7	14	11	8	11	11	11
54	A Saleh (EGY)	11	16	8	11	7	8	6
45	F Kuzmin (RUS)	7	11	5	7	10
55	M Bobocica (ITA)	11	3	11	11	12
