= Mustafa Hussein =

Mustafa Hussein or Mustapha Hussein may refer to:

- Mustafa Hussein (cartoonist), Egyptian cartoonist
- Mustafa Hussein (footballer), British-Turkish Cypriot football player for Crawley Town FC
- Mustafa Hussein (handballer), Egyptian handballer
- Mustapha Hussein, grandson of Saddam Hussein (1989-2003)
