= Brian Beaman =

American sport shooter

Personal information
- Nationality: United States
- Born: May 16, 1984 (age 42) Mobridge, South Dakota, U.S.
- Home town: Selby, South Dakota, U.S.
- Height: 5 ft 10 in (1.78 m)
- Weight: 190 lb (86 kg)

Sport
- Sport: Shooting
- Event(s): 10 m air pistol (AP60); 50 m pistol (FP)
- Coached by: Dan Beaman

Brian Beaman (born May 16, 1984 in Mobridge, South Dakota) is an American sport shooter. In 2011, Beaman won a bronze medal for the men's 10 m air pistol at the ISSF World Cup in Fort Benning, Georgia, with a score of 686.6 points.

== Shooting career ==
Beaman started his sporting career as an avid archer, until he decided to try out for shooting at his teenage years. He attended South Dakota State University for two years majoring in agriculture, before he transferred to Jacksonville State University in Jacksonville, Alabama, where he studied emergency management. Beaman eventually became a member of the rifle shooting team for the NCAA Division I, until he was approached by U.S. national pistol coach Erich Buljung, a silver medalist at the 1988 Summer Olympics in Seoul, to switch from rifle to pistol.

Since 2008, Beaman has been competing at the ISSF World Cup, where he has achieved numerous top-ten finishes in air (AP60) and free pistol (FP). He also won silver medals for the 10 m air pistol at the U.S. national championships, and claimed his first ever career title at the 2010 Championships of the Americas (CAT Games) in Rio de Janeiro, Brazil, with an impressive score of 682.3 points (580 in the preliminary rounds and 102.3 in the final).

Beaman also qualified for the men's 10 m air pistol at the 2008 Summer Olympics in Beijing, by placing second from the U.S. Olympic Team Trials in Fort Benning, Georgia. He had finished on exactly the same score of 682.0 points (581 in the preliminary rounds and 101 in the final), as his teammate Jason Turner, but lost in a shoot-off by two tenths of a point (0.2) for a bonus of 10.3. Beaman initially placed fifth in this event, but was upgraded to a higher position, when North Korea's Kim Jong-Su tested positive for propranolol, and consequently, stripped of his bronze medal.
