= Yuriy Koval (wrestler) =

Ukrainian Greco-Roman wrestler

Personal information
- Full name: Yuriy Volodymyrovych Koval
- Nationality: Ukraine
- Born: 15 July 1980 (age 46) Odesa, Ukrainian SSR, Soviet Union
- Height: 1.60 m (5 ft 3 in)
- Weight: 55 kg (121 lb)

Sport
- Sport: Wrestling
- Event: Greco-Roman
- Club: ZS Odeska Oblast
- Coached by: Oleg Simotchkin

Yuriy Volodymyrovych Koval (Ukrainian: Юрій Володимирович Коваль; born July 15, 1980, in Odesa) is an amateur Ukrainian Greco-Roman wrestler, who played for the men's featherweight category. Koval represented Ukraine at the 2008 Summer Olympics in Beijing, where he competed for the men's 55 kg class. He lost the qualifying round match to Serbia's Kristijan Fris, with a three-set technical score (4–6, 2–1, 1–3), and a classification point score of 1–3.
