= Alfredo Carneros =

Spanish table tennis player

Personal information
- Full name: Alfredo Carneros Beamud
- Nationality: Spain
- Born: 7 October 1978 (age 47) Collado Mediano, Madrid, Spain
- Height: 1.85 m (6 ft 1 in)
- Weight: 102 kg (225 lb)

Sport
- Sport: Table tennis
- Club: San Sebastian de los Reyes
- Playing style: Left-handed, classic
- Equipment: Tibhar Samsonov
- Highest ranking: 129 (December 2008)
- Current ranking: 215 (February 2013)

Alfredo Carneros Beamud (born 7 October 1978) is a Spanish table tennis player. Carneros narrowly lost the bronze medal to his teammate Carlos Machado in the men's singles at the 2009 Mediterranean Games in Pescara, Italy. As of February 2013, Carneros is ranked no. 215 in the world by the International Table Tennis Federation (ITTF). Carneros is a member of the table tennis team for San Sebastian de los Reyes Sports Club in Madrid, and is coached and trained by Alejandro Maldonado. He is also left-handed, and uses the classic grip.

Carneros qualified for the men's singles tournament, as a 29-year-old, at the 2008 Summer Olympics in Beijing, by receiving an allocation spot from the Final World Qualification Tournament in Budapest, Hungary. He defeated Egypt's Adel Massaad in the preliminary round, before losing out his next match to India's Sharath Kamal, with a final set score of 2–4.
