= Ihar Kazloŭ =

Belarusian artistic gymnast (born 1987)

- Born: 14 June 1987 (age 39)

Gymnastics career
- Discipline: Men's artistic gymnastics
- Country represented: Belarus

Ihar Kazloŭ, also known as Igor Kozlov, (Belarusian: Ігар Казлоў; born 14 June 1987) is a Belarusian male artistic gymnast. He competed at the 2008 Summer Olympics in Beijing. He was also a part of the 2006 Ghent World Cup, where he placed fourth in the rings finals.

He was briefly the coach of former Norwegian national team member Aleksander Lundekvam and other gymnasts at Sotra Turn.
