= Shooting at the 2008 Summer Olympics – Men's 10 metre air pistol =

Men's 10 metre air pistol at the Games of the XXIX Olympiad
- Venue: Beijing Shooting Range Hall
- Date: August 9, 2008
- Competitors: 48 from 35 nations
- Winning score: 688.2

Medalists
1st place, gold medalist(s)		Pang Wei	China
2nd place, silver medalist(s)		Jin Jong-oh	South Korea
3rd place, bronze medalist(s)		Jason Turner	United States

The men's 10 metre air pistol event at the 2008 Olympic Games took place on August 9 at the Beijing Shooting Range Hall, and was won by the reigning World champion, Pang Wei of the host country, who thus became the first male gold medal winner of the Beijing Olympics.

The event consisted of two rounds: a qualifier and a final. In the qualifier, each shooter fired 60 shots with an air pistol at 10 metres distance. Scores for each shot were in increments of 1, with a maximum score of 10.

The top 8 shooters in the qualifying round moved on to the final round. There, they fired an additional 10 shots. These shots scored in increments of .1, with a maximum score of 10.9. The total score from all 70 shots was used to determine final ranking.

Kim Jong-su of North Korea originally won the bronze medal, but was disqualified after he tested positive for propranolol, upgrading Turner from fourth to third place.

== Records ==
The existing world and Olympic records were as follows.

Qualification records
World record	Sergei Pyzhianov (URS)	593	Munich, Germany	13 October 1989
Olympic record	Mikhail Nestruyev (RUS)	591	Athens, Greece	14 August 2004

Final records
World record	Sergei Pyzhianov (URS)	695.1 (593+102.1)	Munich, Germany	13 October 1989
Olympic record	Wang Yifu (CHN)	690.0 (590+100.0)	Athens, Greece	14 August 2004

== Qualification round ==
The qualification round was held between 12:00 and 13:45 China Standard Time (UTC+8), with all shooters fitting into a single relay.

Rank	Athlete	Country	1	2	3	4	5	6	Total	Notes
1	Pang Wei	China	97	98	100	96	97	98	586	Q
2	Jin Jong-oh	South Korea	99	96	99	99	94	97	584	Q
	Kim Jong-su	North Korea	97	98	98	98	97	96	584	DQ
4	Jason Turner	United States	98	100	93	96	99	97	583	Q
5	Leonid Yekimov	Russia	95	97	99	97	96	98	582	Q
6	Brian Beaman	United States	98	96	95	98	94	100	581	Q
7	Jakkrit Panichpatikum	Thailand	96	96	98	97	98	96	581	Q
8	Walter Lapeyre	France	98	98	95	96	99	95	581	Q
9	Vigilio Fait	Italy	95	96	98	98	95	98	580	
10	Tanyu Kiryakov	Bulgaria	96	96	97	97	97	97	580	
11	Tan Zongliang	China	95	98	97	99	95	96	580	
12	Norayr Bakhtamyan	Armenia	97	98	97	97	95	96	580	
13	Júlio Almeida	Brazil	98	97	97	98	95	95	580	
14	Damir Mikec	Serbia	96	98	95	99	98	94	580	
15	Dilshod Mukhtarov	Uzbekistan	94	98	99	99	96	94	580	
16	Lee Dae-myung	South Korea	97	98	98	99	95	93	580	
17	Oleg Omelchuk	Ukraine	95	98	96	97	96	97	579	
18	João Costa	Portugal	100	95	97	95	97	95	579	
19	Tomoyuki Matsuda	Japan	97	98	97	97	96	94	579	
20	Rashid Yunusmetov	Kazakhstan	94	98	97	96	97	96	578	
21	Hans-Jörg Meyer	Germany	95	97	93	98	96	98	577	
22	Yury Dauhapolau	Belarus	99	96	95	93	97	97	577	
23	Susumu Kobayashi	Japan	93	96	99	96	96	97	577	
24	Wojciech Knapik	Poland	97	97	99	96	95	93	577	
25	Franck Dumoulin	France	92	96	97	97	97	97	576	
26	Kwon Tong-hyok	North Korea	97	95	95	96	93	99	575	
27	Kanstantsin Lukashyk	Belarus	94	95	97	95	97	97	575	
28	Pavol Kopp	Slovakia	95	95	96	96	98	95	575	
29	Mikhail Nestruyev	Russia	96	96	94	97	99	93	575	
30	Kai Jahnsson	Finland	93	94	97	98	96	96	574	
31	Sergey Babikov	Tajikistan	96	96	95	95	96	96	574	
32	Daniel Repacholi	Australia	97	97	96	95	94	94	573	
33	Christoph Schmid	Switzerland	95	95	98	97	96	92	573	
34	Nguyễn Mạnh Tường	Vietnam	92	99	97	93	95	96	572	
35	Ivan Rybovalov	Ukraine	95	95	96	97	96	93	572	
36	David Moore	Australia	95	94	93	94	98	97	571	
37	Roger Daniel	Trinidad and Tobago	98	95	92	94	96	96	571	
38	Florian Schmidt	Germany	94	96	95	97	93	96	571	
39	Yang Wang	New Zealand	96	93	94	97	97	94	571	
40	Mauro Badaracchi	Italy	94	96	94	96	97	94	571	
41	Nikola Šaranović	Montenegro	94	96	92	96	96	96	570	
42	Samaresh Jung	India	92	95	96	98	96	93	570	
43	Stênio Yamamoto	Brazil	92	96	94	97	92	97	568	
44	Iulian Raicea	Romania	93	97	95	95	96	91	567	
45	Yusuf Dikeç	Turkey	93	97	93	95	94	94	566	
46	Philip Elhage	Netherlands Antilles	93	99	93	93	94	94	566	
47	Mahmod Abdelaly	Egypt	94	94	93	93	92	97	563	
48	Edirisinghe Senanayake	Sri Lanka	91	94	93	91	94	98	561	

DQ Disqualified – Q Qualified for final

1: Kim was third in the original official result list for the qualification round, but was disqualified several days after the final had taken place. In the final version of the document, Kim's result is removed and the third place is empty, indicating that no extra shooter had been allowed into the final.

== Final ==
The final was held at 15:00 China Standard Time (UTC+8).

Rank	Athlete	Qual	1	2	3	4	5	6	7	8	9	10	Final	Total	Shoot-off	Notes
1	Pang Wei (CHN)	586	9.3	10.3	10.5	10.3	10.4	10.3	10.7	10.4	10.7	9.3	102.2	688.2		
2	Jin Jong-oh (KOR)	584	9.5	9.9	10.6	10.3	9.4	10.2	10.1	10.8	9.9	9.8	100.5	684.5		
3	Jason Turner (USA)	583	8.8	10.4	10.6	10.1	10.5	9.5	9.7	10.8	8.9	10.0	99.0	682.0	10.5	
4	Brian Beaman (USA)	581	10.0	10.3	10.3	10.0	10.4	9.1	10.0	10.1	10.4	9.7	101.0	682.0	10.3	
5	Leonid Yekimov (RUS)	582	10.2	10.3	8.7	9.8	10.4	9.5	9.2	10.0	10.6	9.8	98.5	680.5		
6	Walter Lapeyre (FRA)	581	9.7	10.3	9.4	10.7	9.4	10.3	9.6	9.2	10.4	10.3	99.3	680.3		
7	Jakkrit Panichpatikum (THA)	581	9.9	9.6	9.2	9.8	9.7	10.3	10.4	9.1	10.8	9.2	98.0	679.0		
	Kim Jong-su (PRK)	584	9.2	10.2	10.5	9.9	10.3	9.5	10.2	8.9	10.3	10.0	99.0	683.0		DQ

DQ Disqualified
