= Jason Turner (sport shooter) =

American sport shooter

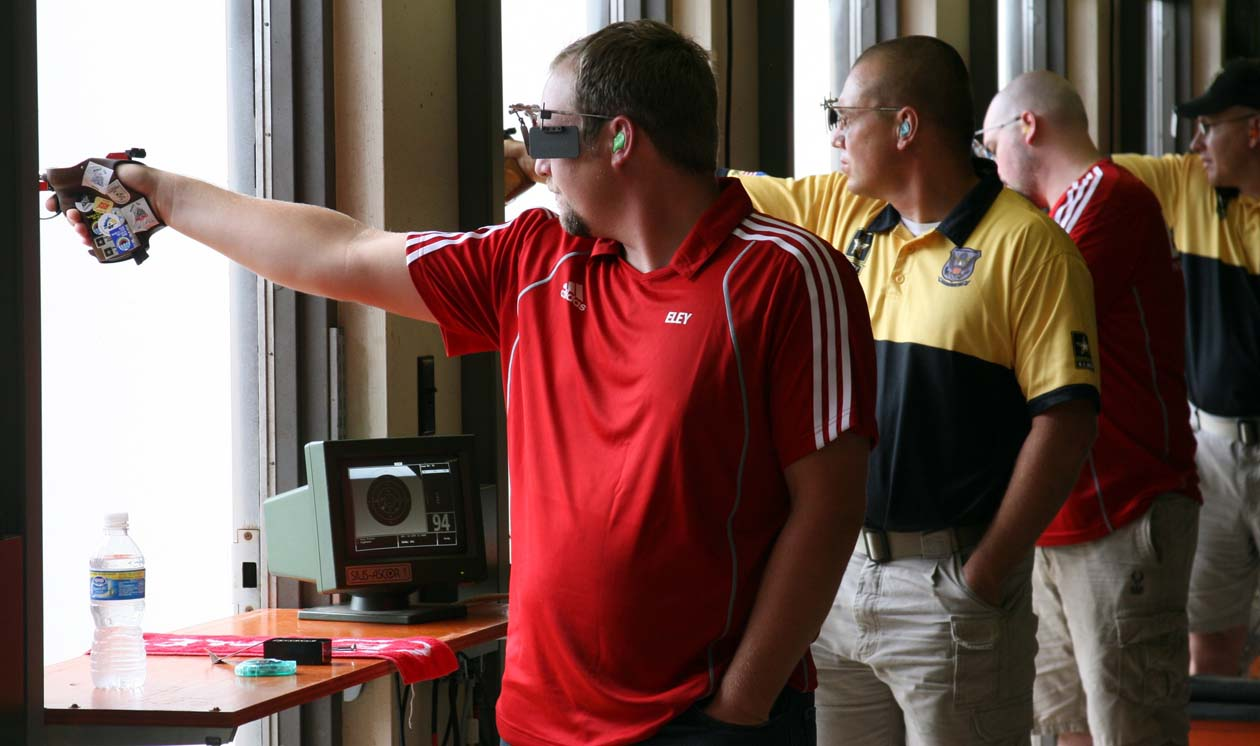

Personal information
- Born: January 31, 1975 (age 51) Rochester, New York, U.S.
Medal record
Men's shooting
Representing United States
Olympic Games
Bronze medal – third place	2008 Beijing	10 m air pistol
Pan American Games
Gold medal – first place	2003 Santo Domingo	10m air pistol
Gold medal – first place	2007 Rio de Janeiro	10m air pistol
Gold medal – first place	2007 Rio de Janeiro	50m pistol

Jason Turner (born January 31, 1975, in Rochester, New York) is an American sport shooter and Olympic athlete who finished fourth at the 2008 Summer Olympics in Beijing in the 10 metre air pistol final. Bronze medalist Kim Jong Su later tested positive for propranolol, disqualifying him and upgrading Turner's position to third. Turner had finished on exactly the same score as his countryman Brian Beaman, but defeated him in a seemingly uninteresting shoot-off for fourth place that would later secure him the bronze medal.

As of November 19, 2018, Turner is the National Pistol Coach for USA Shooting.
