= Gamal Fathy =

Egyptian sabre fencer

Personal information
- Nationality: Egypt
- Born: 29 January 1985 (age 41)

Sport
- Sport: Fencing
- Event: Sabre

Gamal Fathy (Arabic: جمال فتحي; born 29 January 1985) is an Egyptian sabre fencer. Fathy represented Egypt at the 2008 Summer Olympics in Beijing, where he competed in two sabre events. At his first event, the men's individual sabre, Fathy lost the first preliminary round match to Canada's Philippe Beaudry, with a score of 8–15. A few days later, he joined his teammates Tamim Ghazy, Shadi Talaat, and Mahmoud Samir for the men's team sabre. Fathy and his team, however, lost the seventh place match to the Hungarian team (led by Áron Szilágyi), with a total score of 25 touches.
