= Shadi Talaat =

Egyptian fencer

Personal information
- Nationality: Egypt
- Born: 11 August 1989 (age 36)

Sport
- Sport: Fencing
- Event: Sabre

Shadi Talaat (Arabic: شادي طلعت; born 11 August 1989) is an Egyptian sabre fencer. Talaat represented Egypt at the 2008 Summer Olympics in Beijing, where he competed in two sabre events. For his first event, the men's individual sabre, Talaat lost the first preliminary round match to Belarus' Valery Pryiemka, with a score of 7–15. Few days later, he joined teammates Tamim Ghazy, Gamal Fathy, and Mahmoud Samir for the men's team sabre. Talaat and his team, however, lost the seventh place match to the Hungarian team (led by Áron Szilágyi), with a total score of 25 touches.
