= Wrestling at the 2008 Summer Olympics – Men's Greco-Roman 55 kg =

Men's Greco-Roman 55 kg at the Games of the XXIX Olympiad
- Venue: China Agricultural University Gymnasium
- Date: 12 August 2008
- Competitors: 19 from 19 nations

Medalists
1st place, gold medalist(s)		Nazyr Mankiev	Russia
2nd place, silver medalist(s)		Rovshan Bayramov	Azerbaijan
3rd place, bronze medalist(s)		Roman Amoyan	Armenia
3rd place, bronze medalist(s)		Park Eun-chul	South Korea

Men's Greco-Roman 55 kilograms competition at the 2008 Summer Olympics in Beijing, China, was held on August 12 at the China Agricultural University Gymnasium.

This Greco-Roman wrestling competition consists of a single-elimination tournament, with a repechage used to determine the winner of two bronze medals. The two finalists face off for gold and silver medals. Each wrestler who loses to one of the two finalists moves into the repechage, culminating in a pair of bronze medal matches featuring the semifinal losers each facing the remaining repechage opponent from their half of the bracket.

Each bout consists of up to three rounds, lasting two minutes apiece. The wrestler who scores more points in each round is the winner of that rounds; the bout ends when one wrestler has won two rounds (and thus the match).

== Schedule ==
All times are China Standard Time (UTC+08:00)

Date	Time	Event
12 August 2008	09:30	Qualification rounds
12 August 2008	16:00	Repechage
12 August 2008	17:00	Finals

== Results ==
Legend

- F — Won by fall

=== Final ===
Final
Rovshan Bayramov (AZE)	3	2
Nazyr Mankiev (RUS)	4	2

=== Top half ===
Qualifications

1/8 finals
Cha Kwang-su (PRK)	0	1
Yagnier Hernández (CUB)	8	1
Mostafa Mohamed (EGY)	0	0
Rovshan Bayramov (AZE)	4	8
Lasha Gogitadze (GEO)	2	2
Jiao Huafeng (CHN)	0	0
Roman Amoyan (ARM)	4	3
Asset Imanbayev (KAZ)	1	1

Quarterfinals
Yagnier Hernández (CUB)	0	2	0
Rovshan Bayramov (AZE)	5	1	4
Lasha Gogitadze (GEO)	1	2
Roman Amoyan (ARM)	4	3

Semifinals
Rovshan Bayramov (AZE)	7	4
Roman Amoyan (ARM)	2	1

=== Bottom half ===
Qualifications
Hamid Sourian (IRI)	4^{F}
Venelin Venkov (BUL)	0
Kristijan Fris (SRB)	6	1	3
Yuriy Koval (UKR)	4	2	1
Ildar Hafizov (UZB)	1	0
Nazyr Mankiev (RUS)	3	3

1/8 finals
Spenser Mango (USA)	1	5
Virgil Munteanu (ROU)	1	2
Anders Nyblom (DEN)	1	0
Park Eun-chul (KOR)	3	5
Elgin Loren Elwais (PLW)	0	0
Hamid Sourian (IRI)	8	6
Kristijan Fris (SRB)	0	0
Nazyr Mankiev (RUS)	4	6

Quarterfinals
Spenser Mango (USA)	2	1
Park Eun-chul (KOR)	3	6
Hamid Sourian (IRI)	2	1	1
Nazyr Mankiev (RUS)	2	1	1

Semifinals
Park Eun-chul (KOR)	1	0	1
Nazyr Mankiev (RUS)	1	6	2

=== Repechage ===
Repechage round 1
Ildar Hafizov (UZB)	0	1
Kristijan Fris (SRB)	4	1

Repechage round 2
Mostafa Mohamed (EGY)	0	1
Yagnier Hernández (CUB)	6	3
Kristijan Fris (SRB)	0	1
Hamid Sourian (IRI)	5	1

Bronze medals
Yagnier Hernández (CUB)	0	0
Roman Amoyan (ARM)	3	5
Hamid Sourian (IRI)	1	2
Park Eun-chul (KOR)	1	2

== Final standing ==
Rank	Athlete
1st place, gold medalist(s)	Nazyr Mankiev (RUS)
2nd place, silver medalist(s)	Rovshan Bayramov (AZE)
3rd place, bronze medalist(s)	Roman Amoyan (ARM)
3rd place, bronze medalist(s)	Park Eun-chul (KOR)
5	Yagnier Hernández (CUB)
5	Hamid Sourian (IRI)
7	Kristijan Fris (SRB)
8	Spenser Mango (USA)
9	Lasha Gogitadze (GEO)
10	Ildar Hafizov (UZB)
11	Yuriy Koval (UKR)
12	Virgil Munteanu (ROU)
13	Asset Imanbayev (KAZ)
14	Anders Nyblom (DEN)
15	Cha Kwang-su (PRK)
16	Mostafa Mohamed (EGY)
17	Jiao Huafeng (CHN)
17	Venelin Venkov (BUL)
19	Elgin Loren Elwais (PLW)
