= Cha Kwang-su =

North Korean Greco-Roman wrestler (born 1979)

Cha Kwang-Su
Personal information
- Nationality: North Korea
- Born: 25 February 1979 (age 47)
- Height: 1.64 m (5 ft 4 1/2 in)
- Weight: 55 kg (121 lb)

Sport
- Sport: Wrestling
- Event: Greco-Roman
- Team: April 25 Sports Club
Medal record
Men's Greco-Roman wrestling
Asian Games
Bronze medal – third place	2006 Doha	55 kg
Asian Championships
Gold medal – first place	2005 Wuhan	55 kg
Silver medal – second place	2007 Bishkek	55 kg
Silver medal – second place	2008 Jeju City	55 kg

- Cha Kwang-su
- Hangul: 차광수
- RR: Cha Gwangsu
- MR: Ch'a Kwangsu

Cha Kwang-Su (Korean: 차광수; born February 25, 1979) is an amateur North Korean Greco-Roman wrestler, who competed in the men's featherweight category. He won a bronze medal for his division at the 2006 Asian Games in Doha, Qatar. Cha also added three more medals (one gold and two silver) to his collection from the Asian Wrestling Championships.

Cha represented North Korea at the 2008 Summer Olympics in Beijing, where he competed for the men's 55 kg class. He received a bye for the preliminary round of sixteen match, before losing out to Cuba's Yagnier Hernández, who was able to score nine points in two straight periods, leaving Cha with a single point.
