= Mohamed Mamdouh (swimmer) =

Egyptian swimmer

Personal information
- Full name: Mohamed Mamdouh Abdelhamid El-Nady
- Born: March 14, 1985 (age 41)

Sport
- Sport: Swimming

Mohamed Mamdouh Abdelhamid El-Nady (Arabic: محمد النادى; born March 14, 1985) is an Egyptian swimmer, who specialized in sprint freestyle events. He was selected to the Egyptian swimming team at the 2008 Summer Olympics, finishing among the top 60 swimmers in the men's 50 m freestyle.

El-Nady competed for Egypt in the men's 50 m freestyle at the 2008 Summer Olympics in Beijing. He finished with the fastest time and FINA B-standard in 22.36 at the Pan Arab Games one year earlier in Cairo, falling short of the Olympic qualifying cut by just a hundredth of a second (0.01). Swimming on the outside against the vastly experienced field in heat twelve, El Nady could not match his similar pre-Olympic effort with a clearly disappointing 23.92 to round out the field. El-Nady failed to advance to the semifinals, as he placed fifty-fourth out of 97 swimmers in the prelims.
