= Hazem Mohamed =

Egyptian sport shooter

Personal information
- Full name: Hazem Mohamed Ali
- Nationality: Egypt
- Born: 20 September 1969 (age 56)

Sport
- Sport: Shooting
- Event: 50 m rifle prone (FR60PR)

Hazem Mohamed Ali (also Hazem Mohamed, Arabic: حازم محمد علي; born September 20, 1969) is an Egyptian sport shooter. At age thirty-nine, Mohamed made his official debut for the 2008 Summer Olympics in Beijing, where he competed in the 50 m rifle prone. He placed last out of fifty-sixth shooters in this event, by one point behind Nicaragua's Walter Martínez from the final attempt, for a total score of 576 targets.
