= Mahmod Abdelaly =

Egyptian sport shooter

Personal information
- Nationality: Egypt
- Born: 11 March 1967 (age 59)

Sport
- Sport: Shooting
- Event(s): 10 m air pistol (AP60); 50 m pistol (FP)

Mahmod Abdelaly (Arabic: محمود عبد العلي; born March 11, 1967) is an Egyptian sport shooter. At age forty-one, Abdelaly made his official debut for the 2008 Summer Olympics in Beijing, where he competed in the men's 10 m air pistol. He finished only in forty-seventh place by two points ahead of Sri Lanka's Edirisinghe Senanayake, for a total score of 563 targets.
