= Katsiaryna Kulpo =

Belarusian synchronized swimmer

Personal information
- Nationality: Belarus
- Born: 23 December 1987 (age 38) Minsk, Belarus
- Height: 176 cm (5 ft 9 in)
- Weight: 59 kg (130 lb)

Sport
- Sport: Swimming
- Strokes: Synchronized swimming
- Club: BSKP Minsk

Katsiaryna Kulpo (born 23 December 1987) is a Belarusian synchronized swimmer. She competed in the women's duet at the 2008 Olympic Games with Nastassia Parfenava.

Katsiaryna now works as an assistant coach for the Singapore synchronized swimming team.
