= Nastassia Parfenava =

Belarusian synchronized swimmer

Personal information
- Nationality: Belarus
- Born: 5 November 1989 (age 36) Minsk, Belarus
- Height: 174 cm (5 ft 9 in)
- Weight: 57 kg (126 lb)

Sport
- Sport: Swimming
- Strokes: Synchronized swimming
- Club: Tesla Brno

Nastassia Parfenava (born 5 November 1989) is a Belarusian synchronized swimmer. She competed in the women's duet at the 2008 Olympic Games with Katsiaryna Kulpo.
