= Tatyana Troina =

Belarusian basketball player

Basket Gdynia
- Position: Forward
- League: PLKK

Personal information
- Born: 30 June 1981 (age 45) Minsk, Belarus
- Listed height: 6 ft 2 in (1.88 m)

Tatyana Troina (Таццяна Уладзіміраўна Троіна, born 30 June 1981) is a Belarusian basketball player who competed in the 2008 Summer Olympics and in the 2016 Summer Olympics in Rio de Janeiro.
