= Mostafa Mohamed (wrestler) =

Egyptian Greco-Roman wrestler

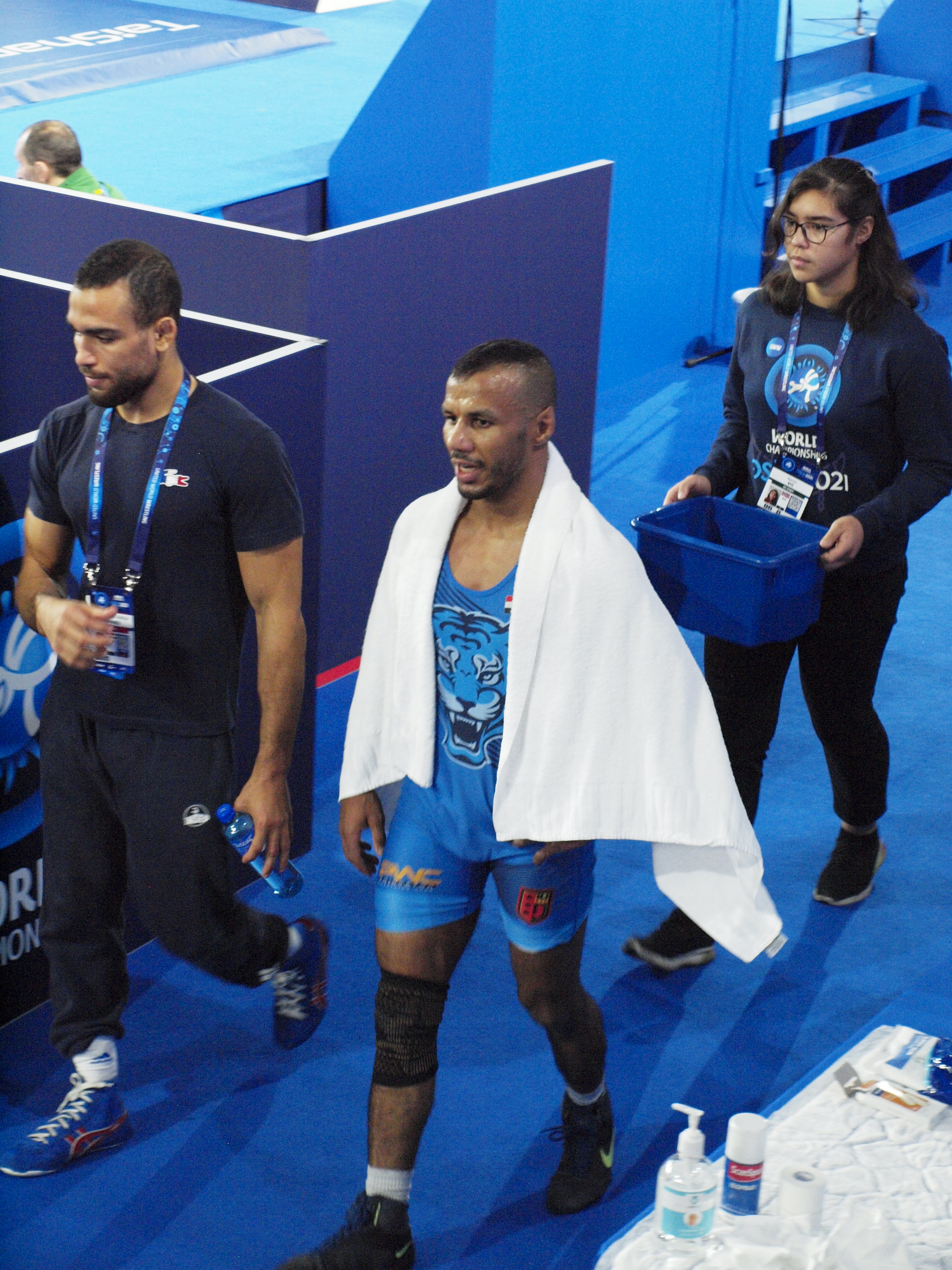
- Mostafa Mohamed in 2021

Personal information
- Nationality: Egypt
- Born: 18 August 1985 (age 40)
- Height: 1.60 m (5 ft 3 in)
- Weight: 55 kg (121 lb)

Sport
- Sport: Wrestling
- Event: Greco-Roman
- Club: Cairo Army Wrestling Club
- Coached by: Hoseim Mostafa
Medal record
Men's Greco-Roman wrestling
Representing Egypt
Mediterranean Games
Silver medal – second place	2009 Pescara	55 kg

Mostafa Mohamed (Arabic: مصطفى محمد; born August 18, 1985) is an amateur Egyptian Greco-Roman wrestler, who played for the men's featherweight category. Mostafa represented Egypt at the 2008 Summer Olympics in Beijing, where he competed for the men's 55 kg class. He received a bye for the preliminary round of sixteen match, before losing out to Azerbaijan's Rovshan Bayramov, with a technical score of 0–12. Because his opponent advanced further into the final match, Mohamed offered another shot for the bronze medal by entering the repechage bouts. He was defeated in the first round by Cuba's Yagnier Hernández, who was able to score nine points in two straight periods, leaving Mohamed with a single point.
