= Franco Donato =

Egyptian sport shooter (born 1981)

Personal information
- Full name: Franco Piero Donato
- Nationality: Egypt
- Born: 8 September 1981 (age 44) Cairo, Egypt
- Height: 1.65 m (5 ft 5 in)
- Weight: 64 kg (141 lb)

Sport
- Sport: Shooting
- Event: Skeet
- Club: Dokki Shooting Club
- Coached by: Lloyd Woodhouse

Franco Piero Donato (Arabic: فرانكو بيرو دوناتو; born September 8, 1981, in Cairo) is an Egyptian skeet sport shooter. Donato represented Egypt at the 2008 Summer Olympics in Beijing, where he competed in the men's skeet shooting. He finished only in thirty-sixth place by one point ahead of Qatar's Rashid Hamad from the final attempt, for a total score of 106 targets. He also participated in the Rio 2016 Olympics
