= Yagnier Hernández =

Cuban Greco-Roman wrestler

Personal information
- Nationality: Cuba
- Born: 14 May 1983 (age 43) Camagüey, Cuba
- Height: 1.65 m (5 ft 5 in)
- Weight: 55 kg (121 lb)

Sport
- Sport: Wrestling
- Event: Greco-Roman
- Club: Cerro Pelado
- Coached by: Juan Carlos Linares
Medal record
Men's Greco-Roman wrestling
Representing Cuba
Pan American Games
Gold medal – first place	2007 Rio de Janeiro	55 kg

Yagnier Hernández (born 14 May 1983 in Camagüey) is an amateur Cuban Greco-Roman wrestler, who played for the men's featherweight category. He won a gold medal for his division at the 2007 Pan American Games in Rio de Janeiro, Brazil, defeating Venezuela's Jorge Cardozo.

Hernandez represented Cuba at the 2008 Summer Olympics in Beijing, where he competed for the men's 55 kg class. He first defeated North Korea's Cha Kwang-Su in the preliminary round of sixteen, before losing out the quarterfinal match to Azerbaijan's Rovshan Bayramov, with a three-set technical score (0–5, 2–1, 0–4), and a classification point score of 1–3. Because his opponent advanced further into the final match, Hernandez offered another shot for the bronze medal by defeating Egypt's Mostafa Mohamed in the repechage rounds. He progressed to the bronze medal match, but narrowly lost the medal to Armenia's Roman Amoyan, with a technical score of 0–8.
