= Heba Ahmed =

Egyptian rower

- Born: 1 January 1984 (age 42); Suhl, Egypt
- Occupation: Rower

Heba Ahmed (Arabic: هبة احمد; born 1 January 1985) is an Egyptian rower.

== Career ==
Ahmed competed in the 2008 Summer Olympics in Beijing in the women's single sculls race where she made it to quarter-finals and placed 2nd in Final E and 24th overall. She won bronze at the 2007 All Africa Games in the lightweight double sculls race with partner Asmaa Sayed and competed at the 2009 World Cup in Banyoles. She was one of the first athletes to compete at an Olympics wearing a hijab .

Ahmed will compete at the 2016 Summer Olympics in Rio de Janeiro in the single sculls race after having placed 4th in the 2015 FISA African Olympic Qualification Regatta in Tunis. She was one of the first women to wear a hijab while competing in the Olympic Games.
