= Omnia Fakhry =

Egyptian modern pentathlete

Omnia Fakhry Draz OLY
Personal information
- Full name: Omnia Fakhry Draz
- Nationality: Egypt
- Born: 2 February 1982 (age 44) Cairo, Egypt
- Height: 1.65 m (5 ft 5 in)
- Weight: 53 kg (117 lb)

Sport
- Sport: Modern pentathlon
- Club: El Shams Club
- Coached by: Makay Marek
Medal record
Women's modern pentathlon
Representing Egypt
World Championships
Bronze medal – third place	2006 Guatemala City	Individual

Omnia Fakhry Draz (Arabic: أمنية فخرى دراز; born February 2, 1982) is an Egyptian modern pentathlete. Fakhry qualified for the 2008 Summer Olympics in Beijing, where she competed in the women's modern pentathlon, along with her teammate Aya Medany. During the competition, Fakhry made a strong performance in the early rounds, when she finished fifth in pistol shooting, and eighteenth in a one-touch épée fencing. She placed second in the third heat in the 200 m freestyle swimming, but displayed a poor performance in the show jumping, when her horse Naonao repeatedly stopped short, veered left before the obstacles, and nearly tossed her over the barrier. In the end, Fakhry finished the event with cross-country running in thirtieth place, for a total score of 4,996 points.
