= Mona El-Hawary =

Egyptian sport shooter

Personal information
- Full name: Mona Mahmud El-Hawary
- Nationality: Egypt
- Born: 3 November 1962 (age 63) Cairo, Egypt
- Height: 1.71 m (5 ft 7 1/2 in)
- Weight: 69 kg (152 lb)

Sport
- Sport: Shooting
- Event: Skeet
- Club: Cairo Shooting Club
- Coached by: Lloyd Woodhouse

Mona Mahmud El-Hawary (Arabic: منى محمود الهواري; born November 3, 1962, in Cairo) is an Egyptian sport shooter. At age forty-six, El-Hawary made her official debut for the 2008 Summer Olympics in Beijing, where she competed in women's skeet shooting. She placed last out of nineteen shooters in the qualifying rounds of the event, with a total score of 50 points.

At the 2012 Summer Olympics in London, El-Hawary improved her performance from the previous games by hitting a total of 51 targets in women's skeet. She finished last (17th) in the women's skeet qualifying round, failing to qualify for the semi-final.

El-Hawary is also a member of the Cairo Shooting Club, and is coached and trained by Lloyd Woodhouse.
