= Noha Yossry =

Egyptian table tennis player

Personal information
- Nationality: Egypt
- Born: 7 February 1992 (age 34) Cairo, Egypt

Sport
- Sport: Table tennis
- Playing style: Right-handed, classic
- Highest ranking: 574 (September 2008)
- Current ranking: 669 (March 2013)
Medal record
Women's table tennis
Representing Egypt
All-Africa Games
Silver medal – second place	2007 Algiers	Team

Noha Yossry (Arabic: نهى يسري; born 7 February 1992 in Cairo) is an Egyptian table tennis player. She won a silver medal, as a member of the Egyptian table tennis team, at the 2007 All-Africa Games in Algiers, Algeria. As of March 2013, Yossry is ranked no. 669 in the world by the International Table Tennis Federation (ITTF). She is also right-handed, and uses the classic grip. She was also mentioned on The Big Bang Theory TV show season 12 episode 2.

Yossry qualified for the women's singles tournament at the 2008 Summer Olympics in Beijing, by receiving a place as one of the top 6 seeded players from the All-Africa Games in Algiers, Algeria. She lost the preliminary round match to Ukraine's Tetyana Sorochinskaya, with a unanimous set score of 0–4.
