= Aya El-Sayed =

Egyptian épée fencer

Personal information
- Nationality: Egypt
- Born: 9 May 1989 (age 37)

Sport
- Sport: Fencing
- Event: Épée

Aya El-Sayed (Arabic: آية السيد; born May 9, 1989) is an Egyptian épée fencer. El-Sayed represented Egypt at the 2008 Summer Olympics in Beijing, where she competed in the women's individual épée event. She lost the preliminary round of thirty-two match to France's Hajnalka Kiraly Picot, with a score of 7–15.
