= Mustafa Hussein (handballer) =

Egyptian handball player

Personal information
- Nationality: Egypt
- Born: 8 January 1984 (age 42)
- Height: 1.96 m (6 ft 5 in)

Sport
- Sport: Handball
- Position: right wing

Senior clubs
- Years: Team
- ?-?: Al Ahly
- ?-?: Al-Qahira
National team
- Years: Team
- ?-?: Egypt

Mustafa Hussein (Arabic: مصطفى حسين, born 8 January 1984) is an Egyptian male handball player. He was a member of the Egypt men's national handball team, playing as a right wing. He was a part of the Egyptian squad at the 2008 Summer Olympics. On club level, he played for Al Ahly in Egypt.
