= Lamyaa Badawi =

Egyptian synchronized swimmer

Personal information
- Nationality: Egyptian
- Born: 1 April 1988 (age 37)

Sport
- Sport: Swimming
- Event: Synchronized swimming
- Updated on 26 October 2014

Lamyaa Badawi (born 1 April 1988) is an Egyptian synchronized swimmer. She competed in the women's team event at the 2008 Olympic Games.
