= Aziza Abdelfattah =

Egyptian synchronized swimmer

Personal information
- Born: 8 December 1990 (age 35) Cairo, Egypt

Sport
- Sport: Synchronised swimming

Aziza Abdelfattah (born 8 December 1990) is an Egyptian synchronized swimmer who competed in the 2008 Summer Olympics.
