= Mai Mohamed =

Egyptian synchronized swimmer

Personal information
- Birth name: Mai Mas'ud Amin Fahmi Mohamed
- Nationality: Egyptian
- Born: 4 April 1990 (age 35); Cairo, Egypt
- Height: 1.66 m (5 ft 5 in)
- Weight: 53 kg (117 lb)

Sport
- Country: Egypt
- Sport: Synchronized swimming
- Event: Team
- Club: El-Zouhour Club

Mai Mas'ud Amin Fahmi Mohamed (born 4 April 1990) is an Egyptian synchronized swimmer who competed in the 2008 Summer Olympics and 2012 Summer Olympics.

== Personal life ==
Mohamed was born on 4 April 1990 in Cairo, Egypt. As of 2012, she is 1.66 m (5 ft 5 in) tall and weighs 53 kg (117 lb).

== Synchronised swimming ==
Mohamed made her Olympic debut at the 2008 Summer Olympics, placing 8th in the Team event. In 2012, Mohamed competed at the 2012 Summer Olympics, placing 7th in the Team event.
