= Nouran Saleh =

Egyptian synchronized swimmer

Personal information
- Born: 6 June 1988 (age 38) Giza, Egypt

Sport
- Sport: Synchronised swimming

Nouran Saleh (born 6 June 1988) is an Egyptian synchronized swimmer who competed in the 2008 Summer Olympics. Nouran is 167 cm tall and weighs 56 kg. She is affiliated with Surfers Paradise Triathlon Club.
