= Adel Massaad =

Egyptian-German table tennis player

Adel Massaad (born June 24, 1964) is a professional table tennis player. He is Egyptian and German. His father is Egyptian whereas his mother is originally from Siberia. He was born in [Moers]-Wesel-Germany. He had won the African table tennis title for men in 1990. In 2007, he qualified to participate in the Summer Olympics 2008, held in Beijing, China. He has been nominated as a double specialist for the team of Egypt in London Olympic Games in 2012 at the age of 48 years. He founded "Adel resort", an equine medical center in Germany for horse therapy and cure.
