= Valery Pryiemka =

Belarusian fencer (born 1983)

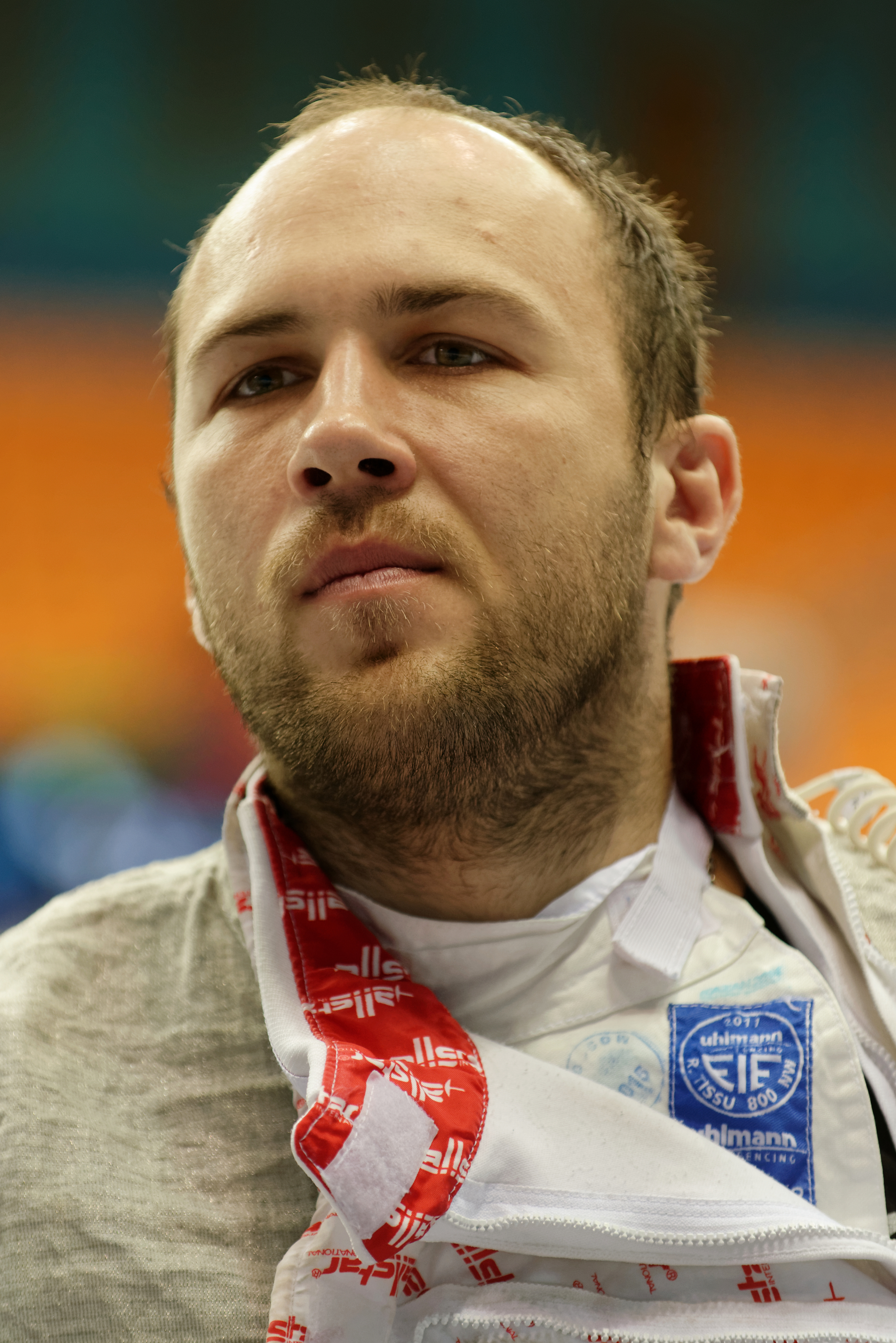

Personal information
- Born: 15 June 1983 (age 43) Minsk, Belarus
- Height: 1.74 m (5 ft 9 in)
- Weight: 69 kg (152 lb)

Fencing career
- Sport: Fencing
- Weapon: sabre
- Hand: right-handed
- National coach: Aliaksandr Surimto
- FIE ranking: current ranking
Medal record
Men's sabre
Representing Belarus
World Championships
Silver medal – second place	2011 Catania	Team
European Championships
Silver medal – second place	2007 Ghent	Team

Valery Pryiemka (Belarusian: Валер Прыёмка, Łacinka: Valer Pryjomka; born 15 June 1983) is a Belarusian fencer, silver medallist in the 2007 European Championships and at the 2011 World Championships. At both the 2008 and 2012 Summer Olympics, he competed in the Men's sabre, but was defeated in the second round. He was also a member of the Belarusian men's sabre team at both these events.
