= Mahmoud Samir (fencer) =

Egyptian fencer

Personal information
- Born: 2 July 1981 (age 45) Cairo, Egypt

Sport
- Sport: Fencing

Mahmoud Samir (born 2 July 1981) is an Egyptian former fencer. He competed in the sabre events at the 2000 and 2008 Summer Olympics.
