= Egyptian women's participation in the Summer Olympics =

Starting in 1984

Egyptian men have participated in the Summer Olympics since the inaugural event in 1896, with Egyptian women participating since the 1984 games.

The Summer Olympics were first held in 1896 in Athens, but women were not permitted to participate until the second edition of the Games in 1900 in Paris. In that year, 23 female athletes competed alongside 1,201 male athletes. Seventy-six years after the inaugural Summer Olympics, Egyptian women were on the cusp of participating in the 1972 Summer Olympics for the first time. However, the Egyptian delegation withdrew from the Games prematurely after the Munich incident. As documented in the official report of the Olympic Organizing Committee, Egypt's planned participation included one female athlete alongside 38 male athletes. However, the participation featured no women and was limited to 23 male athletes.

Egyptian women eventually made their Olympic debut 88 years after the Games' inception, during the 1984 Summer Olympics in Los Angeles. This made Egypt the fourth Arab country to have female participants in the Olympics, after Algeria, Libya, and Syria. Since then, Egyptian women have consistently participated in every Summer Olympics to date.

The number of Egyptian female participants in the Olympics has varied over the years. The first participation in the 1984 Games had the highest number of female athletes (6 athletes) until the 2000 Sydney Games, which saw 15 female athletes. Since then, the number of female athletes has increased in each subsequent Olympics, reaching 34 athletes at the 2012 London Games. This represented the highest proportion of female participation within the Egyptian delegation (31%, with 34 female athletes versus 75 male athletes) since Egyptian women began competing in the Olympics.

Similarly, in terms of sports, the 1984 debut saw Egyptian women competing in most sports (4 sports) until the 2000 Games (9 sports). Since then, the number of sports in which Egyptian women compete has gradually increased, reaching 17 sports in the 2016 Rio Olympics.

From the inaugural participation of Egyptian women in the 1984 Olympics until the conclusion of the 2012 London Games, Egyptian female athletes were unable to secure any medals over 28 years. The closest Egyptian women came to winning a medal was in the 2008 Olympics, where Noha Abd Rabo placed fifth in taekwondo and Abeer Abdelrahman placed fifth in weightlifting. Abeer replicated this achievement at the subsequent Olympics, securing fifth place alongside Nahla Ramadan in distinct weight categories within the weightlifting competition.

On August 10, 2016, Sara Ahmed became the first Egyptian female athlete to win an Olympic medal. Sara Ahmed secured a bronze medal in the 69 kg weightlifting category with a total lift of 255 kg, thereby becoming the first Egyptian woman to win an Olympic medal in over a century of Egyptian participation in the Games. Additionally, she became the inaugural Arab woman to secure an Olympic medal in weightlifting. Subsequently, the International Olympic Committee and the International Weightlifting Federation awarded Abeer Abdelrahman the silver medal in the 75 kg category at the 2012 Summer Olympics, following the disqualification of the top three competitors for doping. On January 12, 2017, it was announced that Abeer had also been awarded the bronze medal in the 69 kg category at the 2008 Summer Olympics due to the disqualification of the first and third-place competitors for doping. Consequently, Abeer Abdelrahman became the first Egyptian female athlete to win an Olympic medal, the first to win two Olympic medals, and the only Egyptian woman to have won a silver medal to date.

With female participation exceeding one-third of the Egyptian delegation, the Tokyo 2020 Olympics marked the largest Egyptian women's participation in the history of the Summer Games. A record 48 Egyptian female athletes competed in 21 different sports, representing the highest number of Egyptian women participating in the Olympics to date.

The first gold medal for an Egyptian woman was won by Feryal Abdelaziz in karate. Additionally, the Egyptian delegation secured the highest number of medals in a single Olympics, with Hedaya Malak and Giana Farouk each winning bronze medals in taekwondo and karate, respectively.

This constituted Malak's second bronze medal, the first having been awarded at the Rio 2016 Games. She became the fifth Egyptian athlete to win multiple medals in the history of the Summer Olympics, joining the ranks of Farid Simaika, Ibrahim Shams, Karam Gaber, and Abeer Abdelrahman.

The participation of women in the Olympic Games has involved multiple instances of relatives competing in different or even the same editions of the Games. Sisters Sherwet and Nevine Hafez were the first Egyptian women to compete together at the 1984 Olympics, participating in swimming events at the ages of 17 and 15, respectively. Subsequently, sisters Shaimaa and Eman El-Gammal both participated in fencing at the 2008 and 2012 Olympics, even competing together in team events in both editions. Before her sister's participation, Shaimaa had already competed in the 2000 and 2004 Games.

Dina Meshref participated in the 2012 London Olympics, following in the footsteps of her aunt, Nihal Meshref, who had previously competed in the 1988 and 1992 Games in table tennis, and her cousin, Yousra Helmy, who had also competed in the 2016 and 2020 Olympics in the same sport. In conclusion, twin sisters Nada and Nihal Saafan participated together in the synchronized swimming team event at the 2016 Rio Olympics.

== 1984 ==
1984 Summer Olympics marked the inaugural participation of Egyptian women in the history of the Olympics since its inception in 1912. Six female athletes, all under the age of 18, competed in three sports. The Egyptian contingent included sisters Sherwit and Nevin Hafez in swimming, Sahar Youssef, Dahlia Mokbel, Sahar Helal in rhythmic swimming, and Rim Hassan in diving. The athletes were notably young, except Sherwit, who was seventeen, and Sahar Helal, who was the youngest competitor in rhythmic swimming and the youngest member of the entire Egyptian delegation. The inaugural Egyptian female participation in the Olympics may be considered unsuccessful, as the athletes did not advance beyond the qualifying rounds. The exception was Dahlia Mokbel, who reached the finals of both the individual and doubles rhythmic swimming competitions.

The participation of Egyptian women in the 1984 Olympics
N	Athlete	Age	Sport
1	Sahar Youssef	15	Synchronized swimming
2	Dahlia Mokbel	15	Synchronized swimming
3	Sahar Helal	15	Synchronized swimming
4	Rim Hassan	15	Diving
5	Sherwite Hafez	17	Swimming
6	Nevin Hafez	15	Swimming

The detailed participation was as follows:

=== Swimming ===
Athlete	Event	Preliminary		Final	
Athlete	Event	Time	Rank	Time	Rank
Sherwite Hafez	100 Meter Freestyle	1:02.78	40	Did not advance	
Nevin Hafez	100 Meter Freestyle	1:04.06	42	Did not advance	
Sherwite Hafez	200 Meter Freestyle	2:16.11	33	Did not advance	
Nevin Hafez	100 Meter Butterfly	Didn't Start	No Rank	Did not advance	

=== Synchronized swimming ===
Sahar Hilal was the youngest athlete participating in all of the rhythmic swimming events, at the age of 15 years and 116 days.

Athlete	Event	Preliminary		Quarterfinal		Final	
Athlete	Event	Points	Rank	Points	Rank	Points	Rank
Dahlia Mokbel	Individual	73.367	44	155.767	16	Did not advance	
Sahar Helal	Individual	70.049	45	Did not advance			
Sahar Youssef	Individual	67.165	84	Did not advance			
Sahar Youssef Dahlia Mokbel	Pair	70.266	17	150.866	17	Did not advance	

=== Diving ===
Athlete	Event	Quarterfinal		Final		Final Rank
Athlete	Event	Points	Rank	Points	Rank	Final Rank
Rim Hassan	Moving jumpers	258.63	24	Did not advance		24
Rim Hassan	Fixed jumpers	146.94	21	Did not advance		24

== 1988 ==
The second appearance of Egyptian women at the 1988 Seoul Olympics was marked by a limited participation of only one athlete, Nihal Meshref, in table tennis. This was a notably weak showing in a Games that witnessed the participation of 2,202 athletes from a multitude of nationalities. Table tennis was the fourth sport in which Egyptian women competed, following swimming, rhythmic swimming, and diving. Nihal participated in five matches within her group and was unsuccessful in all of them, concluding her Olympic experience with a final ranking of 41st and last.

Egyptian women's participation in the 1988 Olympics
N	Athlete	Age	Sport
1	Nihal Meshref	17	Table tennis

The comprehensive participation record is as follows:

=== Table Tennis ===
Athlete	Event	Group Stage						Round of 16	Quarterfinal	Semifinal	Final	
Athlete	Event	Opposition Result	Opposition Result	Opposition Result	Opposition Result	Opposition Result	Rank	Opposition Result	Opposition Result	Opposition Result	Opposition Result	Rank
Nihal Meshref	Singles	NED Vriesekoop L 0–3	YUG Perkučin L 0–3	BULGergelcheva L 0–3	ARG Kim de Rimasa L 1–3	TCH Šafářová L 0–3	6	Did not advance				

== 1992 ==
The number of female athletes at the 1992 Summer Olympics in Barcelona increased to three out of 2,721 athletes of different nationalities. Additionally, the tournament witnessed the second participation of Nihal Meshref, the first Egyptian athlete to participate in two Olympic Games. Additionally, Egyptian women competed in a novel sport, judo, through Heba Hefny, marking the fifth sport in which Egyptian women participated, following swimming, rhythmic swimming, diving, and table tennis. The third athlete was Rania Elwany, who was the youngest member of the Egyptian delegation, at the age of 14 years and 286 days.

Egyptian women's participation in the 1992 Olympics
N	Athlete	Age	Sport
1	Nihal Meshref	21	Table tennis
2	Heba Hefny	19	Judo
3	Rania Elwany	14	Swimming

The participation of Egyptian women was notably limited, with Rania Elwany failing to advance beyond the preliminary stage in the four swimming events in which she competed. The events included the 50-, 100-, and 200-meter freestyle, as well as the 100-meter backstroke. In judo, Heba Hefny was the last competitor to finish in her weight class, with 21 other competitors participating. Finally, in table tennis, Nihal Meshref's final ranking improved from the previous round, placing 33rd after losing two matches and winning one in her group in the preliminary round.

The breakdown of participation was as follows:

=== Swimming ===
Athlete	Event	Preliminary		Final	
Athlete	Event	Time	Rank	Time	Rank
Rania Elwany	50 Meter Freestyle	27.20	32	Did not advance	
Rania Elwany	100 Meter Freestyle	58.82	30	Did not advance	
Rania Elwany	200 Meter Freestyle	2:08.93	31	Did not advance	
Rania Elwany	100 Meter Back	1:10.12	45	Did not advance	

=== Judo ===
Athlete	Event	Round of 16	Quarterfinal	Final	
Athlete	Event	Opposition Result	Opposition Result	Opposition Result	Rank
Heba Hefny	+72 kg	Svetlana Gaundarenko (Unified Team)	Did not advance		20 Bis

=== Table Tennis ===
Athlete	Event	W	L	GW	GL	PW	PL	JPN	EUN	EGY	CUB
Nihal Meshref (EGY)	Individual	1	2	2	4	97	116	0–2	0–2	X	2–0

Final Standing: 33

== 1996 ==
The number of Egyptian female participants in the 1996 Summer Olympics in Atlanta decreased to a mere two athletes: Heba Hefny and Rania Elwani. Both athletes had previously participated in the Olympics, with Hefny having competed in the 1992 Summer Olympics in Barcelona and Elwani having participated in the 1996 Summer Olympics in Atlanta. Elwani was the youngest athlete in the entire Egyptian delegation, at 18 years and 280 days old. Consequently, women's participation was limited to only two sports, neither of which were represented for the first time: judo and swimming.

Egyptian women's participation in the 1996 Olympics
N	Athlete	Age	Sport
1	Heba Hefny	23	Judo
2	Rania Elwany	18	Swimming

In the most recent competition, Heba Hefny demonstrated an improvement in her performance, advancing from her previous ranking. She concluded the event in ninth place, among 20 participants in the heavyweight division of judo. Rania Elwany also exhibited a gain in her final standings in the 50- and 100-meter freestyle events. However, she experienced a decline in her performance in the 200-meter freestyle.

The breakdown of her results is as follows:

=== Judo ===
Athlete	Event	Preliminary	Round of 32	Round of 16	Quarterfinals	Semifinals	Repechage 1	Repechage 2	Repechage 3	Final / BM	
Athlete	Event	Opposition Result	Opposition Result	Opposition Result	Opposition Result	Opposition Result	Opposition Result	Opposition Result	Opposition Result	Opposition Result	Rank
Heba Hefny	−72 kg	—	—	BYE	AUS Burnett W	POLMaksymowa L	FRA Cicot L	did not advance			

Final Standing: 9th

=== Swimming ===
Athlete	Event	Primer		Final	
Athlete	Event	Time	Rank	Time	Rank
Rania Elwany	50 Meter Freestyle	26.26	18	Did not advance	
Rania Elwany	100 Meter Freestyle	56.89	19	Did not advance	
Rania Elwany	200 Meter Freestyle	2:06.94	34	Did not advance	

== 2000 ==
The number of Egyptian female athletes participating in the 2000 Summer Olympics in Sydney has reached 15, representing the largest number of female athletes from Egypt at the Summer Olympics since the inception of Egyptian women's participation in the Games. In addition to swimming, synchronized swimming, diving, table tennis, and judo, Egypt participated in five new sports in which it had never competed before: rhythmic gymnastics, archery, taekwondo, weightlifting, and fencing. This brought the total number of sports in which Egyptian women have participated since their Olympic debut to 10.

For the third consecutive time, Heba Hefny and Rania Elwany participated in the Olympic Games. Heba Hefny concluded the heavyweight judo competition in ninth place, a ranking identical to that achieved in the previous edition. With regard to Rania, she was successful in qualifying for the semifinals in both the 50-meter and 100-meter freestyle events. She achieved this by placing first in her group in the preliminary round of both races, thereby qualifying for the semifinals. In the semifinals, she placed sixth and eighth, respectively. In her respective group, she did not qualify for the final. Additionally, in the 200-meter freestyle, she placed first in her group in the preliminary round, yet her overall ranking was insufficient to qualify for the semifinals. The remaining athletes demonstrated less noteworthy performances, and the breakdown is as follows:

Egyptian women's participation in the 2000 Olympics
N	Athlete	Age	Sport
1	Sherin Taama	18	Rhythmic gymnastics
2	Heba Hefny	27	Judo
3	Marwa Sultan	17	Shooting
4	Hebatallah El-Wazan	23	Shooting
5	Yasmine Helmi	21	Shooting
6	Rania Elwany	22	Swimming
7	Sara Abdel Gawad	18	Synchronized swimming
8	Heba Abdel Gawad	18	Synchronized swimming
9	Shimaa Afifi	19	Taekwondo
10	Bacent Othman	19	Table Tennis
11	Shahira El-Alfy	23	Table Tennis
12	Shaimaa Abdul-Aziz	19	Table Tennis
13	Nagwan El-Zawawi	24	Weightlifting
14	Shaimaa El-Gammal	20	Fencing
15	May Moustafa	17	Fencing

=== Rhythmic gymnastics ===
Athlete	Event	Rope	Hoop	Ball	Ribbon	Total	Rank
Sherin Taama	Individual	9.241	9.250	9.170	9.141	36.802	24

=== Judo ===
Athlete	Event	Preliminary	Round of 32	Round of 16	Quarterfinals	Semifinals	Repechage 1	Repechage 2	Repechage 3	Final / BM		Final Rnank
Athlete	Event	Opposition Result	Opposition Result	Opposition Result	Opposition Result	Opposition Result	Opposition Result	Opposition Result	Opposition Result	Opposition Result	Rank	Final Rnank
Heba Hefny	−78 kg	—	Russia Sandra Kubin	BYE	Didn't Advanced		Ukraine Marina Prokofieva	France Christine Sicotte	Didn't Advanced			9

=== Shooting ===
Marwa Sultan was the youngest competitor in the Shoot event, having reached the age of 17 years and 229 days.

Athlete	Event	Quarterfinals		Final	
Athlete	Event	Score	Rank	Score	Rank
Marwa Sultan	10 Meter Air Rifle	376	49	Didn't Advance	
Yasmine Helmi	10 Meter Air Rifle	390	28	Didn't Advance	
Hebatallah El-Wazan	10 Meter Air pistol	379	16	Didn't Advance	

=== Swimming ===
Athlete	Event	Preliminary		Semifinals		Final		Total Rank
Athlete	Event	Time	Rank	Time	Rank	Time	Rank	Total Rank
Rania Elwany	50 Meter Freestyle	25.87	1	25.95	8	Did not advance		15
Rania Elwany	100 Meter Freestyle	56.31	1	55.85	6	Did not advance		11
Rania Elwany	200 Meter Freestyle	2:01.93	1	Did not advance				21

=== Synchronized Swimming ===
Athlete	Event	Preliminary		Semifinals		Final		Total Rank
Athlete	Event	Score	Rank	Score	Rank	Score	Rank	Total Rank
Sara Abdel Gawad Heba Abdel Gawad	Pair	85.021	20	Did not advance				

=== Taekwondo ===
Athlete	Event	1st Round	Semifinals	Final Rnank
Athlete	Event	Opposition Result	Opposition Result	Final Rnank
Shimaa Afifi	-57 kg	GreeceAreti Athanasopoulou	Didn't Advanced	10

=== Table Tennis ===
Athlete	Event	Group	W	L	GW	GL	PW	PL	Total Rank
Shahira El-Alfy	Individual	O	0	2	0	6	61	126	49
Shaimaa Abdul-Aziz	Individual	M	0	2	0	6	74	126	49
Bacent Othman	Pair	O	0	2	0	4	45	84	25
Shaimaa Abdul-Aziz	Pair	O	0	2	0	4	45	84	25

=== Weightlifting ===
Athlete	Event	Snatch			Clean & Jerk			Total	
Athlete	Event	1	2	3	1	2	3	Weight	Rank
Nagwan El-Zawawi	–69 kg	87.5	92.5	~~95~~	~~110.0~~	~~110.0~~	~~110.0~~	did not finish	

=== Fencing ===
Athlete	Event	Preliminary	Round of 32	Round of 16	Quarterfinals	Semifinals	Final / BM		Final Rnank
Athlete	Event	Opposition Result	Opposition Result	Opposition Result	Opposition Result	Opposition Result	Opposition Result	Rank	Final Rnank
May Moustafa	Individual Sword	China Li Na	Didn't Advance						39
Shaimaa El-Gammal	Individual fencing	USA Ann Marsh	Didn't Advance						40

== 2004 ==
Egypt's representation at the 2004 Summer Olympics in Athens increased from the previous Olympics, with 16 Egyptian athletes participating in 11 distinct sports. Egypt participated for the first time in the women's category in rowing, modern pentathlon, gymnastics, and athletics, thereby expanding the number of different sports in which Egyptian women participated to 14. Heba Abdel Gawad and Shaimaa El Gamal participated for the second consecutive time in the Olympics, while the remaining athletes were participating for the first time. Aya Medany was the youngest athlete in the men's and women's modern pentathlon, only 15 years and 281 days old.

Egyptian women's participation in the 2004 Olympics
N	Athlete	Age	Sport
1	Samah Ramadan	26	Judo
2	Abeer Essawy	17	Taekwondo
3	Jermin Anwar	17	Taekwondo
4	Doaa Moussa	22	Rowing
5	Aya Medany	15	Modern Pentathlon
6	Dina Hosny	20	Shooting
7	Shaimaa Abd El Latif	23	Shooting
8	Salama Ismail	17	Swimming
9	Dalia Allam	23	Synchronized swimming
10	Heba Abdel Gawad	22	Synchronized swimming
11	Shaimaa El-Gammal	24	Fencing
12	May Mansour	19	Archery
13	Lamia Bahnasawy	19	Archery
14	Marwa Hussein	26	Hammer Thrower
15	Nahla Ramadan	19	Weightlifting
16	Enga Mohamed	19	Weightlifting

=== Judo ===
Athlete	Event	Round of 32	Round of 16	Quarterfinals	Semifinals	Repechage 1	Repechage 2	Repechage 3	Final / BM	
Athlete	Event	Opposition Result	Opposition Result	Opposition Result	Opposition Result	Opposition Result	Opposition Result	Opposition Result	Opposition Result	Rank
Samah Ramadan	+78 kg	Russia Donguzashvili	Didn't Advance			South Korea Choi Suk-Li	Didn't Advanced			

=== Taekwondo ===
Athlete	Event	Round of 16	Quarterfinals	Semifinals	Final / BM	
Athlete	Event	Opposition Result	Opposition Result	Opposition Result	Opposition Result	Rank
Jermin Anwar	-49 kg	Canada Gonda 2 - 3	Didn't Advance			
Abeer Essawy	-57 kg	Chinese Taipei Chi Shu Ji 0 - 8	Didn't Advance			

=== Rowing ===
Athlete	Event	Preliminary		Repechage		Semifinals		Final	
Athlete	Event	Time	Rank	Time	Rank	Time	Rank	Time	Rank
Doaa Moussa	Individual	8:26.87	6 R	8:16.57	5 SC/D	8:22.45	6 FD	8:34.80	24
Symbols: FA=Final A (medal); FB=Final B (no medal); FC=Final B C (no medal); FD=Final B D (no medal); FE=Final E (no medal); FF=Final B F (no medal); SA/B=Semifinal A/B; SC/D=Semifinal C/D; SE/F=Semifinal E/F; R=Rehabilitation

=== Modern Pentathlon ===
Aya Medany of Egypt became the youngest competitor in the modern pentathlon, both for men and women, at the age of 15 years and 281 days.

Athlete	Event	Shooting ( 10m Air Gun )			Fencing One Touch Sword			Swimming 200m Freestyle			Equestrianism (Jumping Show)			Running 3000m			Total Points	Final Rank
Athlete	Event	Points	Rank	Points MP	Points	Rank	Points MP	Points	Rank	Points MP	Points	Rank	Points MP	Points	Rank	Points MP	Total Points	Final Rank
Aya Medany	Modern Pentathlon	181	4	1108	-12 19	26	720	2:21.37	13	1224	224	27	976	12:04.06	31	824	4852	28

=== Shooting ===
Athlete	Event	Semifinals		Final	
Athlete	Event	Score	Rank	Score	Rank
Shaimaa Abd El Latif	10 Meter Air Gun	388	33	Did not advance	
Dina Hosny	10 Meter Air Gun	391	27	Did not advance	

=== Swimming ===
Athlete	Event	Preliminary		Semifinals		Final	
Athlete	Event	Score	Rank	Score	Rank	Score	Rank
Salama Ismail	100 Meter Back Swimming	1:12.20	28	Didn't Advance			

=== Synchronized swimming ===
Athletes	Event	Qualifications			Final			Final Standing
Athletes	Event	Technical	Free	Total	Technical	Free	Total	Final Standing
Dalia Allam	Pair	41.167	41.667	82.834	Didn't Advance			21
Heba Abdel Gawad	Pair	41.167	41.667	82.834	Didn't Advance			21

=== Fencing ===
Athlete	Event	Preliminary	Round of 32	Round of 16	Quarterfinals	Semifinals	Final / BM	
Athlete	Event	Opposition Result	Opposition Result	Opposition Result	Opposition Result	Opposition Result	Opposition Result	Rank
Shaimaa El-Gammal	Individual fencing	Russia Boyko 13 - 7	Didn't Advance					

=== ِِِArchery ===
Athlete	Event	Ranking Round		Round of 64	Round of 32	Round of 16	Quarterfinals	Semifinals	Final / BM	
Athlete	Event	Score	Number	Opposition Result	Opposition Result	Opposition Result	Opposition Result	Opposition Result	Opposition Result	Rank
Lamia Bahnasawy	Individual	564	63	South Korea Lee Sung-jin 164 - 127	Didn't Advance					
May Mansour	Individual	536	64	South Korea Park Sung-hyun 154 - 102	Didn't Advance					

=== Hammer Thrower ===
Athlete	Event	Semifinals		Final	
Athlete	Event	Distance	Rank	Distance	Rank
Marwa Hussein	Hammer Throwing	62.27	38	Did not advance	

=== Weightlifting ===
Athlete	Weight	Snatch (kg)		Clean & Jerk (kg)		Total	Rank
Athlete	Weight	Score	Rank	Score	Rank	Total	Rank
Enga Mohamed	-48 kg	75	12	90	13	165	13
Nahla Ramadan	75 kg	120	3	~~147.5~~	Didn't Advance	120	Didn't Advance

== 2008 ==
Egypt's participation in the 2008 Summer Olympics in Beijing saw a notable increase, with 27 Egyptian athletes representing 13 different sports, an increase of 11 athletes from the previous edition. Additionally, the number of sports in which Egyptian women have participated since their inaugural appearance at the Olympics increased to 17, including gymnastics, Romanian wrestling, and badminton. Notably, this was the highest number of female athletes who had previously participated in the Olympics, with five athletes: Samah Ramadan, Aya Madani, Shaimaa Abdel Latif, Shaimaa Abdel Aziz (second participation), and Shaimaa El Gamal (third participation).

Female athletes from Egypt demonstrated noteworthy achievements in select sports at the Games. Aya Madani secured the eighth position (out of 36) in the final ranking of the modern pentathlon competition, while Noha Abd Rabbo attained the fifth position (out of 16) in the taekwondo heavyweight category. Additionally, Noha Abd Rabbo attained the fifth position (out of 16) in the taekwondo heavyweight competition. Furthermore, Abeer Abdel Rahman also concluded the event in fifth place in weightlifting (light heavyweight category).

On January 12, 2017, Abeer Abdel Rahman secured the bronze medal in the 69 kg weightlifting competition following the disqualification of the first and third-place finishers, who were subsequently found to have used performance-enhancing drugs. This achievement marked the first occasion that an Egyptian woman had won a medal at the Summer Olympics.

Egyptian women's participation in the 2008 Olympics
N	Athlete	Age	Sport
1	Noha Yossry	16	Table tennis
2	Shaimaa Abdul-Aziz	27	Table tennis
3	Heba Ahmed	23	Rowing
4	Sherine El-Zeiny	17	Artistic gymnastics
5	Samah Ramadan	30	Judo
6	Aya Medany	19	Modern pentathlon
7	Omnia Fakhry	26	Modern pentathlon
8	Mona El-Hawary	45	Shooting
9	Shaimaa Abd El Latif	27	Shooting
10	Nouran Saleh	20	Synchronized swimming
11	Mai Mohamed	18	Synchronized swimming
12	Youmna Khallaf	16	Synchronized swimming
13	Dalia El-Gebaly	16	Synchronized swimming
14	Hagar Badran	19	Synchronized swimming
15	Lamyaa Badawi	20	Synchronized swimming
16	Shaza El-Sayed	15	Synchronized swimming
17	Aziza Abdelfattah	17	Synchronized swimming
18	Reem Abdalazem	15	Synchronized swimming
19	Eman Gaber	19	Fencing
20	Aya El-Sayed	19	Fencing
21	Shaimaa El-Gammal	28	Fencing
22	Eman El Gammal	26	Fencing
23	Haiat Farag	21	Wrestling
24	Soha Abd El- A'al	35	Archery
25	Abeer Abdelrahman	16	Weightlifting
26	Noha Abd Rabo	21	Taekwondo
27	Hadia Hosny	20	Badminton

=== Table tennis ===
Athlete	Event	Preliminary	Round 1	Round 2	Semifinals	Final / BM	
Athlete	Event	Opposition Result	Opposition Result	Opposition Result	Opposition Result	Opposition Result	Rank
Shaimaa Abdul-Aziz	Individual	Chinese Taipei Pan Li Chun 4 - 0	Didn't Advance				
Noha Yossry	Individual	Ukraine Sorochinskaya (Ukraine)	Didn't Advance				

=== Rowing ===
Athlete	Event	Preliminary		Quarterfinals		Semifinals		Final	
Athlete	Event	Time	Rank	Time	Rank	Time	Rank	Time	Rank
Heba Ahmed	Individual	8:46.96	4 E	Moved to the final				8:07.10	24

=== Gymnastics ===
Athlete	Event	Qualifiers						Final					
Athlete	Event	Position				Score	Rank	Position				Score	Rank
Athlete	Event	F	V	UB	BB	Score	Rank	F	V	UB	BB	Score	Rank
Sherine El-Zeiny	Demonstration gymnastics: Individual	12.650	13.750	10.600	13.000	50.000	61	Didn't Advance					

=== Judo ===
Athlete	Event	Round of 32	Round of 16	Quarterfinals	Semifinals	Repechage 1	Repechage 2	Repechage 3	Final / BM	
Athlete	Event	Opposition Result	Opposition Result	Opposition Result	Opposition Result	Opposition Result	Opposition Result	Opposition Result	Opposition Result	Rank
Samah Ramadan	+78 kg	Automatic	Cuba Ortiz	Didn't Advance		Automatic	Australia Shepherd	South Korea Kim Ya-young	Didn't Advance	

=== Modern pentathlon ===
Athlete	Event	Shooting ( 10m Air Gun )			Fencing One Touch Sword			Swimming 200m Freestyle			Equestrianism (Jumping Show)			Running 3000m			Total Points	Final Rank
Athlete	Event	Points	Rank	Points MP	Points	Rank	Points MP	Points	Rank	Points MP	Points	Rank	Points MP	Points	Rank	Points MP	Total Points	Final Rank
Omnia Fakhry	Modern Pentathlon	186	5	1168	-17 18	18	808	2:15.72	9	1292	312	35	776	11:32.10	33	952	4996	30
Aya Medany	Modern Pentathlon	184	9	1144	-22 13	5	928	2:15.69	8	1292	196	30	1004	10:36.05	11	1176	5544	8

=== Shooting ===
Athlete	Event	Qualifiers		Final	
Athlete	Event	Score	Rank	Score	Rank
Mona El-Hawary	Skeet	50	19	Didn't Advance	
Shaimaa Abd El Latif	10 Meter Air Gun	393	23	Didn't Advance	

=== Synchronised swimming ===
Athletes	Event	Qualifications			Final		Final Standing
Athletes		Technical	Free	Total	Free	Total	Final Standing
Reem Abdalazem Dalia El-Gebaly	Pair	41.167	40.250	80.667	Didn't Advance		24
Reem Abdalazem Aziza Abdelfattah Shaza El-Sayed Lamyaa Badawi Hagar Badran Dalia El-Gebaly Youmna Khallaf Mai Mohamed Nouran Saleh	Team	39.750	-	-	41.083	80.833	8

=== Fencing ===
Athlete	Event	Round of 64	Round of 32	Round of 16	Quarterfinals	Semifinals	Final / BM	
Athlete	Event	Opposition Result	Opposition Result	Opposition Result	Opposition Result	Opposition Result	Opposition Result	Rank
Aya El-Sayed	Individual Sword	-	France Pequot 5 - 7	Didn't Advance				
Eman El Gammal	Individual Fencing	Netherlands Angad-Gower 13–4	Didn't Advance					
Shaimaa El-Gammal	Individual Fencing	Egypt Eman Gaber 12 - 15	South Korea Nam Hyun-hee 6 - 15	Didn't Advance				
Eman Gaber	Individual Fencing	Egypt Shaimaa El-Gammal 15 - 12	Didn't Advance					
Eman El Gammal Shaimaa El-Gammal Eman Gaber	Fencing Team	-			Russia 23 - 45	China 24 - 45	Poland 14 - 45	8

=== Wrestling ===
Athlete	Event	Round of 32	Round of 16	Quarterfinals	Semifinals	Repechage 1	Repechage 2	Repechage 3	Final / BM	
Athlete	Event	Opposition Result	Opposition Result	Opposition Result	Opposition Result	Opposition Result	Opposition Result	Opposition Result	Opposition Result	Rank
Haiat Farag	-63 kg	USA Randy Miller 0 - 3 ^{PO}	Didn't Advance							13

=== Archery ===
Athlete	Event	Ranking Round		Round of 32	Round of 16	Quarterfinals	Semifinals	Final / BM	
Athlete	Event	Score	Number	Opposition Result	Opposition Result	Opposition Result	Opposition Result	Opposition Result	Rank
Soha Abd El- A'al	Individual	587	57	Great Britain Folkard 107 - 95					

=== Weightlifting ===
Athlete	Weight	Snatch (kg)		Clean & Jerk (kg)		Total	Rank
Athlete	Weight	Score	Rank	Score	Rank	Total	Rank
Abeer Abdelrahman	-69	105	6	133	3	238	3rd place, bronze medalist(s)

=== Taekwondo ===
Athlete	Event	Round of 16	Quarterfinals	Semifinals	Repechage	Bronze medal	Final / BM	
Athlete	Event	Opposition Result	Opposition Result	Opposition Result	Opposition Result	Opposition Result	Opposition Result	Rank
Noha Abd Rabo	+67	Norway Solem 3 - 9	Didn't Advance		Malaysia Chee Choo Chan 5 - 1	Great Britain Stephenson 1 - 5	Didn't Advance	5

=== Badminton ===
Athlete	Event	Round of 64	Round of 32	Round of 16	Quarterfinals	Semifinals	Final / BM	
Athlete	Event	Opposition Result	Opposition Result	Opposition Result	Opposition Result	Opposition Result	Opposition Result	Rank
Hadia Hosny	Individual	Mexico Angulo 21-18 | 7-21 | 21–14	Bulgaria Nedelcheva 7-21 | 4-21	Didn't Advance				

== 2012 ==
The Egyptian contingent at the Summer Olympics was the largest in the history of the Games, with 34 athletes representing Egypt, including 20 first-time participants, 12 second-time participants, Aya Madani, who was participating for the third time, and Shaimaa El Gamal, who was participating for the fourth time. El Gamal is the first Egyptian to participate in four Olympic Games since the inception of women's participation in the Olympics in 1984. Mona El-Hawary was the oldest member of the Egyptian delegation, having reached the age of 49 years and 269 days. In contrast, Farida Osman was the youngest, having reached the age of 17 years and 198 days.

Abeer Abdel Rahman and Nahla Ramadan achieved fifth place in the +75 and -75 weightlifting competitions, respectively.

Four years later, the International Olympic Committee (IOC) and the International Weightlifting Federation (IWF) awarded Abeer Abdel Rahman a silver medal in the 75 kg category, following the disqualification of the top three finishers due to doping violations. This made her the first Egyptian athlete to win a silver medal at the Olympics.

In the Romanian wrestling competition, Egypt fielded a team of 16 athletes, with Rabab Eid representing the country in the female category. The sport with the largest Egyptian female participation was rhythmic swimming, with the Egyptian delegation including eight female athletes, three of whom were participating in the Olympics for the first time. The largest representation in gender-neutral sports was in fencing, with six female and six male athletes from Egypt. In the sports in which both genders could participate, but in which Egypt's participation was limited to women, these included badminton, in which Hadia Hosny participated, and soccer, boat racing, wrestling, equestrian, judo, and athletics. In the latter sport, Noura El Sayed did not participate despite her registration to do so.

Egyptian women's participation in the 2012 Olympics
N	Athlete	Age	Sport
1	Hedaya Malak	19	Taekwondo
2	Seham El-Sawalhy	21	Taekwondo
3	Fatma Rashed	28	Rowing
4	Sara Baraka	20	Rowing
5	Salma Mahmoud El Said Mohamed	16	Gymnastics
6	Sherine El-Zeiny	27	Gymnastics
7	Yasmine Rostom	19	Rhythmic gymnastics
8	Aya Medany	23	Modern pentathlon
9	Mona El-Hawary	49	Shooting
10	Nourhan Amer	19	Shooting
11	Farida Osman	17	Swimming
12	Mai Mohamed	22	Synchronized swimming
13	Youmna Khallaf	20	Synchronized swimming
14	Samar Hassounah	24	Synchronized swimming
15	Dalia El-Gebaly	20	Synchronized swimming
16	Nour El-Afandi	19	Synchronized swimming
17	Aya Darwish	17	Synchronized swimming
18	Shaza El-Sayed	19	Synchronized swimming
19	Reem Abdalazem	19	Synchronized swimming
20	Salma Mahran	22	Fencing
21	Eman Gaber	23	Fencing
22	Rana El Husseiny	20	Fencing
23	Shaimaa El-Gammal	32	Fencing
24	Eman El Gammal	30	Fencing
25	Mona Hassanein	26	Fencing
26	Rabab Eid	21	Wrestling
27	Nada Kamel	21	Archery
28	Dina Meshref	18	Table tennis
29	Raghd Magdy	29	Table tennis
30	Nadeen El-Dawlatly	19	Table tennis
31	Nahla Ramadan	27	Weightlifting
32	Esmat Mansour	25	Weightlifting
33	Abeer Abdelrahman	20	Weightlifting
34	Hadia Hosny	23	Badminton

=== Taekwondo ===
Athlete	Event	Round of 16	Quarterfinals	Semifinals	Repechage	Bronze medal	Final / BM	
Athlete	Event	Opposition Result	Opposition Result	Opposition Result	Opposition Result	Opposition Result	Opposition Result	Rank
Hedaya Malak	-57 kg	New Zealand Tichung 17 - 6	France Harnois 6 - 8	Didn't Advance				
Seham El-Sawalhy	-67 kg	Sweden Johansson 0 - 6	Didn't Advance					

=== Rowing ===
Athlete	Event	Preliminary		Repechage		Semifinals		Final	
Athlete	Event	Time	Rank	Time	Rank	Time	Rank	Time	Rank
Sara Baraka Fatma Rashed	Dual Lightweight	7:45.23	6 R	7:54.01	6 FC	Automatic		8:14.17	17
Symbols: FA=Final A (medal); FB=Final B (no medal); FC=Final B C (no medal); FD=Final B D (no medal); FE=Final E (no medal); FF=Final B F (no medal); SA/B=Semifinal A/B; SC/D=Semifinal C/D; SE/F=Semifinal E/F; R=Rehabilitation

=== Gymnastics ===
Athlete	Event	Qualifiers						Final					
Athlete	Event	Position				Score	Rank	Position				Score	Rank
Athlete	Event	F	V	UB	BB	Score	Rank	F	V	UB	BB	Score	Rank
Salma Mahmoud	All-around	12.500	13.533	12.566	13.066	51.665	41	Didn't Advance					
Sherine El-Zeiny	Floor exercise	11.000	-			11.000	82	Didn't Advance					
Sherine El-Zeiny	Balance beam	-			12.733	12.733	53	Didn't Advance					

=== Synchronized swimming ===
		Qualifiers						Final					
Athlete	Event	batons	Hoop	Ball	Ribbon	Total	Rank	batons	Hoop	Ball	Ribbon	Total	Rank
Yasmine Rostom	Individual	25.050	23.925	23.775	23.500	96.250	23	Didn't Advance					

=== Modern Pentathlon ===
Athlete	Fencing One Touch Sword			Swimming 200m Freestyle			Equestrianism (Jumping Show) and Running 3000m			Shooting ( 10m Air Gun ) and Running 3000m			Total Points	Final Rank
Athlete	Points	Rank	Points MP	Points	Rank	Points MP	Points	Rank	Points MP	Points	Rank	Points MP	Total Points	Final Rank
Aya Medany	-12 15	8	880	2:18.70	18	1136	76	19	1124	12:31.92	21	1996	5136	16

=== Shooting ===
Athlete	Event	Qualifiers		Final	
Athlete	Event	Score	Rank	Score	Rank
Nourhan Amer	10 Meter Air Gun	391	41	Didn't Advance	
Mona El-Hawary	Skeet	51	17	Didn't Advance	

=== Swimming ===
Athlete	Event	Preliminary		Semifinals		Final	
Athlete	Event	Score	Rank	Score	Rank	Score	Rank
Farida Osman	50 Meter Freestyle	26.34	40	Didn't Advance			

=== Synchronized swimming ===
The Egyptian synchronized swimming team has qualified for the Olympics, having finished as the top African team at the 2011 World Aquatics Championships. This marks the second occasion that Egypt has qualified for the Olympics at the team level, having previously done so in 2008. Shatha Abdel Rahman and Dalia El Gebaly competed together in the doubles competition, finishing in 24th and last place, respectively. On the team level, Egypt finished in seventh place, ahead of only Australia.

Athletes	Event	Qualifications			Final Standing	Final		Final Standing
Athletes		Technical	Free	Total	Final Standing	Free	Total	Final Standing
Shaza El-Sayed	Pair	75.700	76.400	152.100	24	Didn't Advance		
Dalia El-Gebaly	Pair	75.700	76.400	152.100	24	Didn't Advance		
Reem Abdalazem	Team	77.600	-			78.360	155.960	7
Shaza El-Sayed	Team	77.600	-			78.360	155.960	7
Aya Darwish	Team	77.600	-			78.360	155.960	7
Nour El-Afandi	Team	77.600	-			78.360	155.960	7
Dalia El-Gebaly	Team	77.600	-			78.360	155.960	7
Samar Hassounah	Team	77.600	-			78.360	155.960	7
Youmna Khallaf	Team	77.600	-			78.360	155.960	7
Mai Mohamed	Team	77.600	-			78.360	155.960	7

=== Fencing ===
Athlete	Event	Round of 64	Round of 32	Round of 16	Quarterfinals	Semifinals	Final / BM	
Athlete	Event	Opposition Result	Opposition Result	Opposition Result	Opposition Result	Opposition Result	Opposition Result	Rank
Mona Hassanein	Individual Sword	Chinese Taipei Hsu GT 10 - 15	Didn't Advance					
Eman El Gammal	Individual Fencing	Venezuela Fuenmayor 9–15	Didn't Advance					
Shaimaa El-Gammal	Individual Fencing	Lebanon Mona Chaitou 6–7	Didn't Advance					
Eman Gaber	Individual Fencing	Automatic	France Guillart 2–15	Didn't Advance				
Eman El Gammal	Team Fencing	-		GBR 6–15	Didn't Advance			
Shaimaa El-Gammal	Team Fencing	-		GBR 6–15	Didn't Advance			
Eman Gaber	Team Fencing	-		GBR 6–15	Didn't Advance			
Rana El Husseiny	Team Fencing	-		GBR 6–15	Didn't Advance			
Salma Mahran	Individual Arab sword	-	USA Wozniak 6–15	Didn't Advance				

=== Wrestling ===
Rabab Eid is the second Egyptian to compete in Romanian wrestling at the Olympic Games, following Hayat Farag in 2008. She secured a place in the 55 kg freestyle category at the Olympics by finishing second in the African and Oceanian qualifying tournament, behind Tunisia's Marwa Amri. However, at the Olympics, she was eliminated by Ukraine's Tetyana Lazareva in the round of 16.

Athlete	Event	Round of 16	Quarterfinals	Semifinals	Final / BM	
Athlete	Event	Opposition Result	Opposition Result	Opposition Result	Opposition Result	Rank
Rabab Eid	-55 kg	-	Ukraine Lazareva 0-5^{VT}	Didn't Advance		16

=== Table Tennis ===
Athlete	Event	Preliminary	Round 1	Round 2	Round 3	Round 4	Semifinals	Final / BM	
Athlete	Event	Opposition Result	Opposition Result	Opposition Result	Opposition Result	Opposition Result	Opposition Result	Opposition Result	Rank
Nadeen El-Dawlatly	Individual	Automatic	Denmark Skov 0–4	Didn't Advance					
Dina Meshref	Individual	Nigeria Edem 2–4	Russia Noskova 4–3	Romania Samara 1–4	Didn't Advance				
Nadeen El-Dawlatly	Team	-				NED 0–3	Didn't Advance		
Raghd Magdy	Team	-				NED 0–3	Didn't Advance		
Dina Meshref	Team	-				NED 0–3	Didn't Advance		

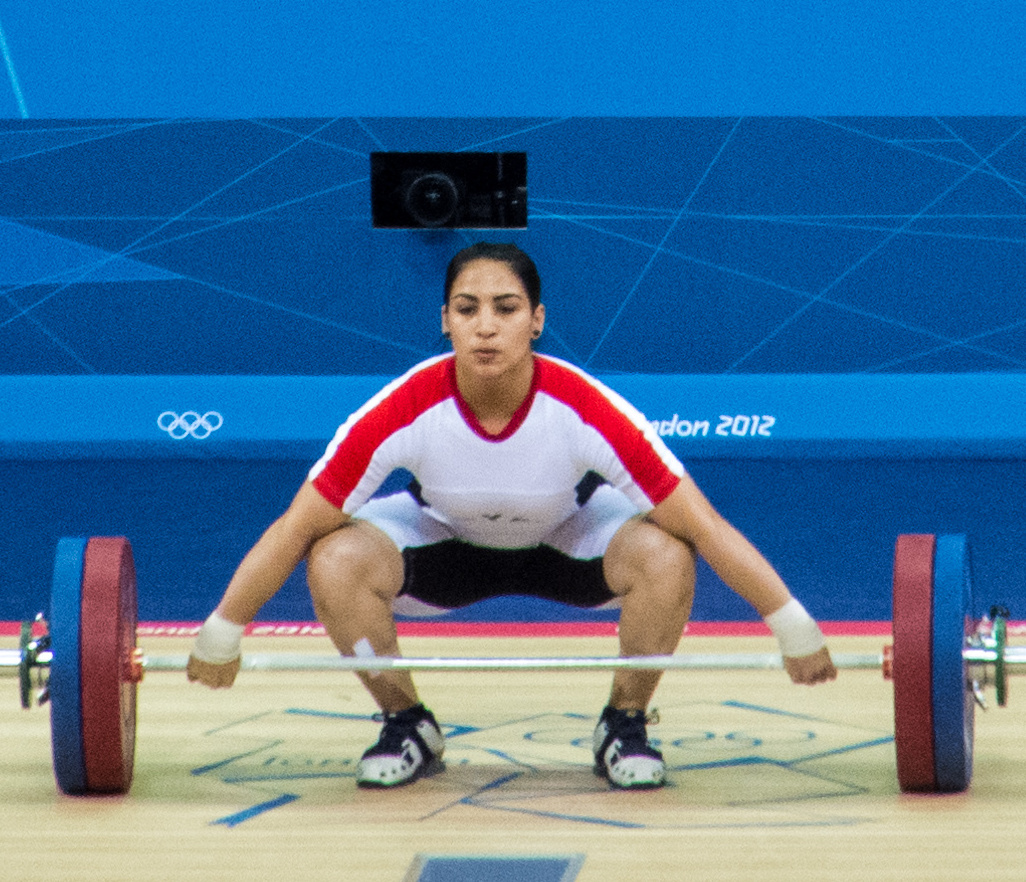
Abeer Abdel Rahman concluded her participation in the 2012 Summer Olympics in fifth place. Subsequently, the International Olympic Committee (IOC) and the International Weightlifting Federation (IWF) announced that she had been awarded the only silver medal in the history of Egyptian women's participation in the Summer Olympics. This decision was made following the discovery that the top three finishers had engaged in the use of performance-enhancing substances.

=== Weightlifting ===
Athlete	Weight	Snatch (kg)		Clean & Jerk (kg)		Total	Rank
Athlete	Weight	Score	Rank	Score	Rank	Total	Rank
Esmat Mansour	-69 kg	105	9	130	9	235	9
Abeer Abdelrahman	-75 kg	118	5	140	2	258	2nd place, silver medalist(s)
Nahla Ramadan	+75 kg	122	6	155	5	577	5

=== Badminton ===
Athlete	Event	Group stage			exclusionary	Quarterfinals	Semifinals	Final / BM	
Athlete	Event	Opposition Result	Opposition Result	Rank	Opposition Result	Opposition Result	Opposition Result	Opposition Result	Rank
Hadia Hosny	Individual	France Be 11-21 | 9-21	Ireland Maggie 17-21 | 6-21	3	Didn't Advance				

== 2016 ==
The 2016 Summer Olympics in Rio de Janeiro saw the largest Egyptian women's contingent at that time, with 37 Egyptian athletes participating. Of these, 30 were competing for the first time, five were competing for the second time, and Sherine El-Zeiny and Shaimaa Abdel-Latif were participating for the third time.

In a historic moment for Egyptian women, Sara Ahmed became the first Egyptian woman to win an Olympic medal in weightlifting after lifting a total of 255 kg, earning a bronze medal in the 69 kg category. This achievement marks the first time an Egyptian woman has won an Olympic medal in weightlifting since Egypt's participation in the Olympics began 104 years ago. Additionally, Ahmed's accomplishment makes her the first Arab woman to win an Olympic medal in the weightlifting competition. Hedaya Malak subsequently validated the capabilities of Egyptian women by attaining a second bronze medal for Egyptian women and a third for the entire delegation in that session. This occurred prior to the International Olympic Committee (IOC) and the International Weightlifting Federation (IWF) conferring a silver medal upon Abeer Abdel Rahman for the London 2012 Games and subsequently a bronze medal for the Beijing 2008 Games, following the disqualification of several medalists for doping violations.

Egyptian women's participation in the 2016 Olympics
N	Athlete	Age	Sport
1	Fatma El Sharnouby	18	Sport of athletics
2	Hedaya Malak	23	Taekwondo
3	Seham El-Sawalhy	25	Taekwondo
4	Nadia Negm	18	Rowing
5	Yousra Abdel Razek	20	Table tennis
6	Dina Meshref	22	Table tennis
7	Nadeen El-Dawlatly	23	Table tennis
8	Sherine El-Zeiny	25	Gymnastics
9	Haydy Morsy	16	Modern pentathlon
10	Israa Ahmed	17	Weightlifting
11	Sara Ahmed	18	Weightlifting
12	Shaimaa Khalaf	25	Weightlifting
13	Hadir Mekhimar	18	Shooting
14	Afaf El-Hodhod	19	Shooting
15	Shaimaa Abd El Latif	35	Shooting
16	Reem Mohamed	20	Swimming
17	Farida Osman	21	Swimming
18	Nariman Aly	17	Synchronised swimming
19	Leila Abdelmoez	19	Synchronised swimming
20	Nada Saafan	19	Synchronised swimming
21	Nehal Saafan	19	Synchronised swimming
22	Nour Elayoubi	19	Synchronised swimming
23	Dara Hassanien	20	Synchronised swimming
24	Samia Ahmed	20	Synchronised swimming
25	Salma Negmeldin	20	Synchronised swimming
26	Jomana Elmaghrabi	21	Synchronised swimming
27	Ebtissam Mohamed	19	Track cyclist
28	Menatalla Karim	20	Canoe sprint
29	Maha Amer	17	Diving
30	Maha Abdalsalam Gouda	18	Diving
31	Nada Meawad	18	Volleyball
32	Doaa Elghobashy	19	Volleyball
33	Nada Hafez	18	Fencing
34	Noura Mohamed	18	Fencing
35	Enas Mostafa	27	Wrestling
36	Samar Amer	21	Wrestling
37	Reem Mansour	22	Archery

=== Sport of athletics ===
Fatma El Sharnouby has been selected to participate in the Olympic Games, having met the requisite criteria.

Athlete	Event	Preliminary		Semifinals		Final	
Athlete	Event	Score	Rank	Score	Rank	Score	Rank
Fatma El Sharnouby	800 Meter	2:21.24	8	Didn't Advance			

=== Taekwondo ===
Hedaya Malak was automatically designated a qualifier in the 57 kg category, having achieved a ranking within the top six of the Olympic world rankings. Meanwhile, Seham El-Sawalhy was designated a qualifier as one of the top two finishers in the 67 kg category at the 2016 African Qualifying Championships in Agadir, Morocco.

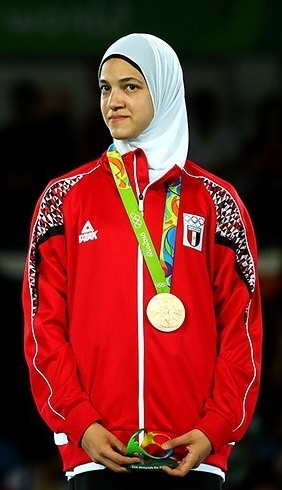
Hedaya Malak became the second Egyptian woman to win a bronze medal in the history of the Summer Olympics.

Athlete	Event	Round of 16	Quarterfinals	Semifinals	Repechage	Bronze medal	
Athlete	Event	Opposition Result	Opposition Result	Opposition Result	Opposition Result	Opposition Result	Rank
Hedaya Malak	-57 kg	Colombia Patino 13 - 0	Japan Mayo 3–0	Spain Calvo 0–1	Automatic	Belgium Asimani 1–0	3rd place, bronze medalist(s)
Seham El-Sawalhy	-67 kg	Ivory Coast Gbagbé 3–4	Didn't Advance				

=== Rowing ===
Nadia attained qualification for the Olympic Games through her performance in the 2015 African qualifying tournament held in Tunis, Tunisia.

Athlete	Event	Preliminary		Repechage		Quarterfinals		Semifinals		Final	
Athlete	Event	Time	Rank	Time	Rank	Time	Rank	Time	Rank	Time	Rank
Nadia Negm	Individual Rowing	9:14.55	3	Automatic		8:25.75	6	8:39.50	6	8:09.47	24

=== Table Tennis ===
Nadeen El-Dawlatly and Dina Meshref were selected to represent their country at the Olympic Games after attaining a semifinal position at the 2015 African Games. Youssa Helmy was additionally included in the Olympic qualifying team as the highest-ranked athlete from Africa in the Olympic world rankings.

Athlete	Event	Preliminary	Round 1	Round 2	Round 3	Semifinals	Final / BM	
Athlete	Event	Opposition Result	Opposition Result	Opposition Result	Opposition Result	Opposition Result	Opposition Result	Rank
Nadeen El-Dawlatly	Individual	Automatic	Hungary Lovas 0–4	Didn't Advance				
Dina Meshref	Individual	Tunisia Saïdani 4–0	Thailand Kumwong 1–4	Didn't Advance				
Nadeen El-Dawlatly	Team	-				SIN 0–3	Didn't Advance	
Yousra Abdel Razek	Team	-				SIN 0–3	Didn't Advance	
Dina Meshref	Team	-				SIN 0–3	Didn't Advance	

=== Gymnastics ===
Following an apology from South Africa for the African seat, Sherine El-Zaini became the first South African to qualify for the Olympics on three occasions.

Athlete	Event	Qualifiers						Final					
Athlete	Event	Position				Score	Rank	Position				Score	Rank
Athlete	Event	F	V	UB	BB	Score	Rank	F	V	UB	BB	Score	Rank
Sherine El-Zeiny	Floor exercise	12.533			12.533	69	Didn't Advance						

=== Modern Pentathlon ===
Haydy Morsy was selected to represent her country at the Olympic Games following her victory at the 2015 African Championships.

Athlete	Fencing One Touch Sword			Swimming 200m Freestyle			Equestrianism (Jumping Show) and Running 3000m			Shooting ( 10m Air Gun ) and Running 3000m			Total Points	Final Rank
Athlete	Points	Rank	Points MP	Points	Rank	Points MP	Mistakes	Rank	Points MP	Points	Rank	Points MP	Total Points	Final Rank
Haydy Morsy	-14 12	0	32	184	2:26.11	36	-	31	0	13:24.93	28	496	942	36

=== Weightlifting ===
The three Egyptian athletes were selected to participate in the weightlifting competitions at the Olympic Games based on the combined ranking of their respective teams in the 2014 and 2015 World Weightlifting Championships.

Athlete	Weight	Snatch (kg)		Clean & Jerk (kg)		Total	Rank
Athlete	Weight	Score	Rank	Score	Rank	Total	Rank
Israa Ahmed	-63 kg	100	5	116	8	216	7
Sara Ahmed	-69 kg	112	3	143	3	255	3rd place, bronze medalist(s)
Shaimaa Khalaf	+75 kg	117	7	161	3	278	4

=== Shooting ===
The three Egyptian shooters were selected based on their performance in the 2014 and 2015 World Championships, the 2015 World Cup Series, and the African Championships up until March 31, 2016.

Athlete	Event	Qualifiers		Semifinals		Final	
Athlete	Event	Score	Rank	Score	Rank	Score	Rank
Afaf El-Hodhod	10 Meter Air Pistol	386	5	-		137.1	5
Afaf El-Hodhod	25 Meter Pistol	573	25	Didn't Advance			
Shaimaa Abd El Latif	10 Meter Air Gun	413	27	-		Didn't Advance	
Hadir Mekhimar	10 Meter Air Gun	10.3	49	-		Didn't Advance	

=== Swimming ===
Both Reem Mohamed and Farida Osman satisfied the criteria for qualification for the Olympic Games.

Athlete	Event	Preliminary		Semifinals		Final	
Athlete	Event	Score	Rank	Score	Rank	Score	Rank
Reem Mohamed	10 km Open Water	Not Applicable				2:05:19.1	25
Farida Osman	50 Meter Freestyle	24.91	18	Didn't Advance			
Farida Osman	100 Meter Butterfly	57.83 AF	11	58.26	11	Didn't Advance	

=== Synchronized swimming ===
Athletes	Event	Qualifications			Final Standing	Final		Final Standing
Athletes		Technical	Free	Total	Final Standing	Free	Total	Final Standing
Samia Ahmed	Pair	76.5306	77.6000	154.1306	23	Didn't Advance		
Dara Hassanien	Pair	76.5306	77.6000	154.1306	23	Didn't Advance		
Nariman Aly	Team	76.9838	Not Applicable			78.5667	155.5505	7
Leila Abdelmoez	Team	76.9838	Not Applicable			78.5667	155.5505	7
Samia Ahmed	Team	76.9838	Not Applicable			78.5667	155.5505	7
Nour Elayoubi	Team	76.9838	Not Applicable			78.5667	155.5505	7
Jomana Elmaghrabi	Team	76.9838	Not Applicable			78.5667	155.5505	7
Dara Hassanien	Team	76.9838	Not Applicable			78.5667	155.5505	7
Salma Negmeldin	Team	76.9838	Not Applicable			78.5667	155.5505	7
Nada Saafan	Team	76.9838	Not Applicable			78.5667	155.5505	7
Nehal Saafan	Team	76.9838	Not Applicable			78.5667	155.5505	7

=== Track cyclist ===
Ebtissam Mohamed became the first Egyptian woman to qualify for the Olympics in the sport of cycling.

Athlete	Event	Preliminary		Repechage		Round 1	Round 2	Semifinals	Final / BM	
Athlete	Event	Time/ Speed	Rank	Time	Rank	Time/ Speed	Time/ Speed	Time/ Speed	Time/ Speed	Rank
Ebtissam Mohamed	Runner	12.920 55.727	27	Didn't Advance						

=== Canoe sprint ===
Athlete	Event	Preliminary		Semifinals		Final	
Athlete	Event	Time	Rank	Time	Rank	Time	Rank
Menatalla Karim	200 Meter Individual	49.596	7	Didn't Advance			

=== Diving ===
Athlete	Event	Preliminary		Semifinals		Final	
Athlete	Event	Points	Rank	Points	Rank	Points	Rank
Maha Amer	3 Meter Springboard	238.55	28	Didn't Advance			
Maha Abdalsalam Gouda	10 Meter Platform	276.15	24	Didn't Advance			

=== Volleyball ===
Athlete	Preliminary		Round of 16	Semifinals	Final / BM	
Athlete	Opposition Result	Group Rank	Opposition Result	Opposition Result	Opposition Result	Rank
Doaa Elghobashy	Group D Germany Laura Ludwig - Kira Walkenhorst 0-2(12-21 | 15 - 21) Italy Giombini - Marta Menegatti 0-2(10-21 | 13–21) Canada Bruder - Kristina May 0-2(12-21 | 16–21)	4	Didn't Advance			
Nada Meawad	Group D Germany Laura Ludwig - Kira Walkenhorst 0-2(12-21 | 15 - 21) Italy Giombini - Marta Menegatti 0-2(10-21 | 13–21) Canada Bruder - Kristina May 0-2(12-21 | 16–21)	4	Didn't Advance			

=== Fencing ===
Athlete	Event	Round of 64	Round of 32	Round of 16	Quarterfinals	Semifinals	Final / BM	
Athlete	Event	Opposition Result	Opposition Result	Opposition Result	Opposition Result	Opposition Result	Opposition Result	Rank
Noura Mohamed	Fencing	-	Tunisia Inès Boubakri 4–15	Didn't Advance				
Nada Hafez	Sabre	Venezuela Benitez 11–15	Didn't Advance					

=== Wrestling ===
Athlete	Event	Preliminary	Round of 16	Quarterfinals	Semifinals	Final / BM	
Athlete	Event	Opposition Result	Opposition Result	Opposition Result	Opposition Result	Opposition Result	Rank
Enas Mostafa	-69 kg	-	Venezuela María Acosta 3-1^{PP}	Brazil Gilda Oliveira 5-0^{VT}	Russia Natalia Vorobieva 0-5^{VT}	Kazakhstan Sizdekova 1-3^{PP}	5
Samar Amer	-75 kg	Russia Bukina 1-3^{PP}	Didn't Advance				12

=== Archery ===
Athlete	Event	Ranking Round		Round of 64	Round of 32	Round of 16	Quarterfinals	Semifinals	Final / BM	
Athlete	Event	Score	Rank	Opposition Result	Opposition Result	Opposition Result	Opposition Result	Opposition Result	Opposition Result	Rank
Reem Mansour	Individual	596	56	Chinese Taipei Lin 0–6	Didn't Advance					

== 2020 ==
With the participation of over one-third of the Egyptian delegation, Tokyo 2020 Summer Olympics witnessed the largest Egyptian women's participation in the history of the Games, with 48 Egyptian athletes representing 21 different sports, a record for the country.

Taekwondo athlete Hedaya Malak was the first Egyptian competitor to win a medal at the Games, claiming the bronze medal in the 67 kg competition. This marks the second occasion on which Hedaya has secured a bronze medal, having previously achieved this same result at the Rio 2016 Olympic Games. She thus becomes the fifth Egyptian athlete to win more than one medal in the history of the Summer Olympics, following in the footsteps of Farid Smika, Ibrahim Shams, Karam Gaber, and Abeer Abdel Rahman.

Feryal Ashraf became the first Egyptian woman to win an Olympic gold medal. She secured this achievement by winning the gold medal in the +61 kg women's kumite event within the karate competition at the 2020 Tokyo Olympics.

On August 6, 2021, Gianna Farouk's medal was awarded to the Egyptian women's team, marking the third occasion on which the nation had achieved a podium finish in the Games.

Egyptian women's participation in the 2020 Olympics
N	Athlete	Age	Sport
1	Amal Adam	39	Archery
2	Hanna Hiekal	19	Synchronized swimming
3	Laila Ali Mohsen	20	Synchronized swimming
4	Maryam Maghraby	16	Synchronized swimming
5	Shahd Samer	18	Synchronized swimming
6	Nora Azmy	21	Synchronized swimming
7	Farida Radwan	21	Synchronized swimming
8	Nehal Saafan	24	Synchronized swimming
9	Jayda Sharaf	20	Synchronized swimming
10	Doha Hany	23	Badminton
11	Hadia Hosny	33	Badminton
12	Samaa Ahmed	23	Canoe sprint
13	Ebtissam Mohamed	24	Track cyclist
14	Maha Abdalsalam Gouda	23	Diving
15	Yara El-Sharkawy	22	Fencing
16	Noha Hany	20	Fencing
17	Noura Mohamed	23	Fencing
18	Mariam El-Zoheiry	21	Fencing
19	Nada Hafez	23	Fencing
20	Zeina Ibrahim	18	Gymnastics
21	Mandy Mohamed	21	Gymnastics
22	Habiba Marzouk	19	Rhythmic gymnastics
23	Login Elsasyed	18	Rhythmic gymnastics
24	Polina Fouda	18	Rhythmic gymnastics
25	Salma Saleh	17	Rhythmic gymnastics
26	Malak Selim	18	Rhythmic gymnastics
27	Tia Sobhy	18	Rhythmic gymnastics
28	Malak Hamza	19	Trampoline gymnastics
29	Radwa Sayed	24	Karate
30	Giana Farouk	26	Karate
31	Feryal Abdelaziz	22	Karate
32	Amira Kandil	18	Modern Pentathlon
33	Haydy Morsy	21	Modern Pentathlon
34	Khouloud Mansy	23	Sailing
35	Radwa Abdel Latif	31	Shooting
36	Maggy Ashmawy	28	Shooting
37	Hala El-Gohari	25	Shooting
38	Alzahraa Shaban	30	Shooting
39	Farida Osman	26	Swimming
40	Farah Abd Al-Aziz	28	Table Tennis
41	Yousra Abdel Razek	25	Table Tennis
42	Dina Meshref	27	Table Tennis
43	Nour Abdelsalam	28	Taekwondo
44	Hedaya Malak	28	Taekwondo
45	Mayar Sherif	25	Tennis
46	Basmla ElSalamoney	22	Triathlon
47	Enas Mostafa	32	Freestyle wrestling
48	Samar Amer	26	Freestyle wrestling

Archery

Athlete	Event	Ranking Round		Round of 64	Round of 32	Round of 16	Quarterfinals	Semifinals	Final / BM	
Athlete	Event	Score	Rank	Opposition Result	Opposition Result	Opposition Result	Opposition Result	Opposition Result	Opposition Result	Rank
Women
Amal Adam	Individual	570	63	South Korea Jamg Min Hee 0–6	Didn't Advance					
Mix( Women and men)
Amal Adam	Team	1215	29	Not Applicable		Didn't Advance				
Youssof Tolba	Team	1215	29	Not Applicable		Didn't Advance				

=== Synchronized swimming ===
The Egyptian synchronized swimming team has secured a position at the 2020 Tokyo Olympics, having attained the highest ranking among African teams at the 2019 World Championships. The team finished in 17th place out of 27 participating teams.

Athletes	Event	Qualifications			Final Standing	Final		Final Standing
Athletes		Technical	Free	Total	Final Standing	Free	Total	Final Standing
Hanna Hiekal	Pair	77.8625	78.9000	156.7625	19	Didn't Advance		
Laila Ali Mohsen	Pair	77.8625	78.9000	156.7625	19	Didn't Advance		
Maryam Maghraby	Team	77.9147	Not Applicable			80.0000	157.9147	8
Shahd Samer	Team	77.9147	Not Applicable			80.0000	157.9147	8
Hanna Hiekal	Team	77.9147	Not Applicable			80.0000	157.9147	8
Laila Ali Mohsen	Team	77.9147	Not Applicable			80.0000	157.9147	8
Nora Azmy	Team	77.9147	Not Applicable			80.0000	157.9147	8
Farida Radwan	Team	77.9147	Not Applicable			80.0000	157.9147	8
Nehal Saafan	Team	77.9147	Not Applicable			80.0000	157.9147	8
Jayda Sharaf	Team	77.9147	Not Applicable			80.0000	157.9147	8

=== Badminton ===
Athlete	Event	Group Stage				Round of 16	Quarterfinal	Semifinal	Final	
Athlete	Event	Opposition Result	Opposition Result	Opposition Result	Rank	Opposition Result	Opposition Result	Opposition Result	Opposition Result	Rank
Women
Doha Hany	Individual	China Chen Yufei (5-21 | 3-21)	Turkey Neslihan Yigit (5-21 | 5-21)	Not Applicable	3	Didn't Advance				
Doha Hany	Pair	Japan Mayu Matsumoto / Wakana Nagahara (7-21 | 3-21)	Netherlands Selina Biek/Cheryl Sennen (6-21 | 10–21)	Canada Rachel Honerich/Christine Tsai (5-21 | 6-21)	4	Didn't Advance				
Hadia Hosny	Pair	Japan Mayu Matsumoto / Wakana Nagahara (7-21 | 3-21)	Netherlands Selina Biek/Cheryl Sennen (6-21 | 10–21)	Canada Rachel Honerich/Christine Tsai (5-21 | 6-21)	4	Didn't Advance				
Mixed doubles
Adham Hatem Elgamal	Pair	China Huang Yaqiong/Zheng Siwei (5-21 | 10–21)	South Korea Cha Woo Jung / Choi Seol Gyu (7-21 | 4-21)	Netherlands Selina Pijk/Robin Tapeling (9-21 | 4-21)	4	Didn't Advance				
Doha Hany	Pair	China Huang Yaqiong/Zheng Siwei (5-21 | 10–21)	South Korea Cha Woo Jung / Choi Seol Gyu (7-21 | 4-21)	Netherlands Selina Pijk/Robin Tapeling (9-21 | 4-21)	4	Didn't Advance				

=== Canoe sprint ===
Athlete	Event	Preliminary		Quarterfinal		Semifinals		Final	
Athlete	Event	Time	Rank	Time	Rank	Time	Rank	Time	Rank
Samaa Ahmed	200 Meter K-1	47.272	7	47.882	7	Didn't Advance			
Samaa Ahmed	500 Meter K-1	2:13.007	7	2:06.033	5	Didn't Advance			

=== Track cyclist ===
Athlete	Event	Scratch race		Rhythm race		Elimination race		Points race		Total Points	Rank
Athlete	Event	Rank	Point	Rank	Point	Rank	Point	Rank	Point	Total Points	Rank
Ebtissam Mohamed	Omnium	-	16	18	-40	17	30	-	-	-	18

=== Diving ===
Athlete	Event	Preliminary		Semifinals		Final	
Athlete	Event	Points	Rank	Points	Rank	Points	Rank
Maha Abdalsalam Gouda	10 Meter Platform	275.30	20	Didn't Advance			

=== Fencing ===
Athlete	Event	Round of 64	Round of 32	Round of 16	Quarterfinals	Semifinals	Final / BM	
Athlete	Event	Opposition Result	Opposition Result	Opposition Result	Opposition Result	Opposition Result	Opposition Result	Rank
Yara El-Sharkawy	Individual - Foil (fencing)	-	Italy Arianna Errigo (Italy) 2–15	Didn't Advance				
Noha Hany	Individual - Foil (fencing)	-	China Chen Qingyuan 6–15	Didn't Advance				
Noura Mohamed	Individual - Foil (fencing)	-	Japan Yuka Ueno 5-15	Didn't Advance				
Yara El-Sharkawy	Team - Foil (fencing)	-			-	Position 5–8 Japan -45 27	HUN -45 28	
Noha Hany	Team - Foil (fencing)	-			-	Position 5–8 Japan -45 27	HUN -45 28	
Noura Mohamed	Team - Foil (fencing)	-			-	Position 5–8 Japan -45 27	HUN -45 28	
Mariam El-Zoheiry	Team - Foil (fencing)	-			-	Position 5–8 Japan -45 27	HUN -45 28	
Nada Hafez	Individual - Sabre (fencing)	-	South Korea Kim Ji-yeon 4-15	Didn't Advance				

=== Gymnastics ===
Athlete	Event	Qualifiers						Final					
Athlete	Event	Position				Score	Rank	Position				Score	Rank
Athlete	Event	F	V	UB	BB	Score	Rank	F	V	UB	BB	Score	Rank
Zeina Ibrahim	Individual General	13.200	12.500	11.866	11.700	49.266	64	Didn't Advance					
Mandy Mohamed	Individual General	13.233	11.033	11.200	12.833	48.866	67	Didn't Advance					

=== Rhythmic gymnastics ===
Egypt qualified for the 2020 Olympic Games in rhythmic gymnastics for the first time by winning individual and team gold at the African Championships in Sharm El Sheikh.

		Qualifiers						Final					
Athlete	Event	batons	Hoop	Ball	Ribbon	Total	Rank	batons	Hoop	Ball	Ribbon	Total	Rank
Habiba Marzouk	Individual	21.100	21.700	22.150	8.400	73.350	25	Didn't Advance					

Athlete	Event	Preliminary				Final			
Athlete	Event	5	3+5	Score	Rank	5	3+5	Score	Rank
Login Elsasyed	Group	36.300	33.050	69.350	13	Didn't Advance			
Polina Fouda	Group	36.300	33.050	69.350	13	Didn't Advance			
Salma Saleh	Group	36.300	33.050	69.350	13	Didn't Advance			
Malak Selim	Group	36.300	33.050	69.350	13	Didn't Advance			
Tia Sobhy	Group	36.300	33.050	69.350	13	Didn't Advance			

=== Trampoline gymnastics ===
Athlete	Qualifiers		Final	
Athlete	Score	Rank	Score	Rank
Samaa Ahmed	94.720	9	Didn't Advance	

=== Karate ===
Five karate players from Egypt are participating in their inaugural Olympic Games. Of the three, Gianna Lotfy secured a direct qualification for the Olympics by finishing in the top four of the International Karate Federation (IKF) Olympic rankings. Feryal Abdelaziz finished among the top three in the 2021 World Qualifiers in Paris, France, thereby obtaining an additional seat for Egypt. Radwa Sayed qualified by attaining the highest ranking in the IKF Olympic rankings for Africa in her category.

Kumite
Athlete	Event	Group Stage					Semifinal	Final	
Athlete	Event	Opposition Result	Opposition Result	Opposition Result	Opposition Result	Rank	Opposition Result	Opposition Result	Rank
Radwa Sayed	-55 kg	Kazakhstan Mulder Zhangbai 2–7	Ukraine Anzhelika Terliuga 0–1	Japan Miho Miyahara 5–3	Austria Bettina Plank 6–7	5	Didn't Advance		
Giana Farouk	-61 kg	Peru Alexandra Grande 2–0	Ukraine Anita Serugina 2–1	Morocco Btissam Sadini 5–0	Serbia Jovana Brajkovic 1-1^{+}	2	China Yin Xiaoyan 1-1^{+}	-	3rd place, bronze medalist(s)
Feryal Abdelaziz	+61 kg	China Gong Li 4–0	Switzerland Elena Keresi 3^{+}3-^{S}	Iran Hamideh Abbasali 7–9	Algeria Lamia Maatoub 0-0	1	Kazakhstan Sofia Beroltseva 5–4	Azerbaijan Irina Zaretska 2–0	1st place, gold medalist(s)

=== Modern Pentathlon ===
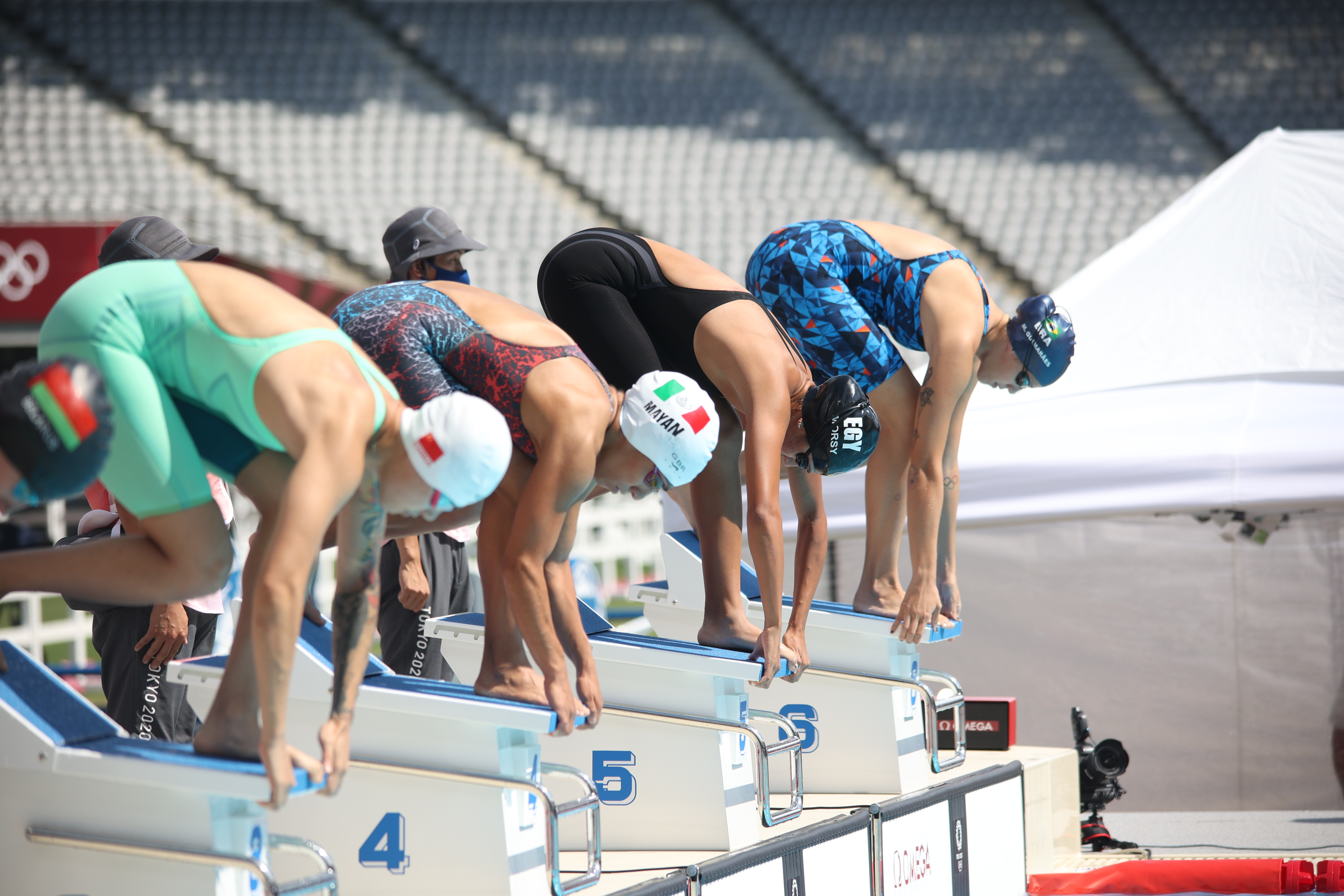
Haydy Morsy in the modern pentathlon swimming competition.

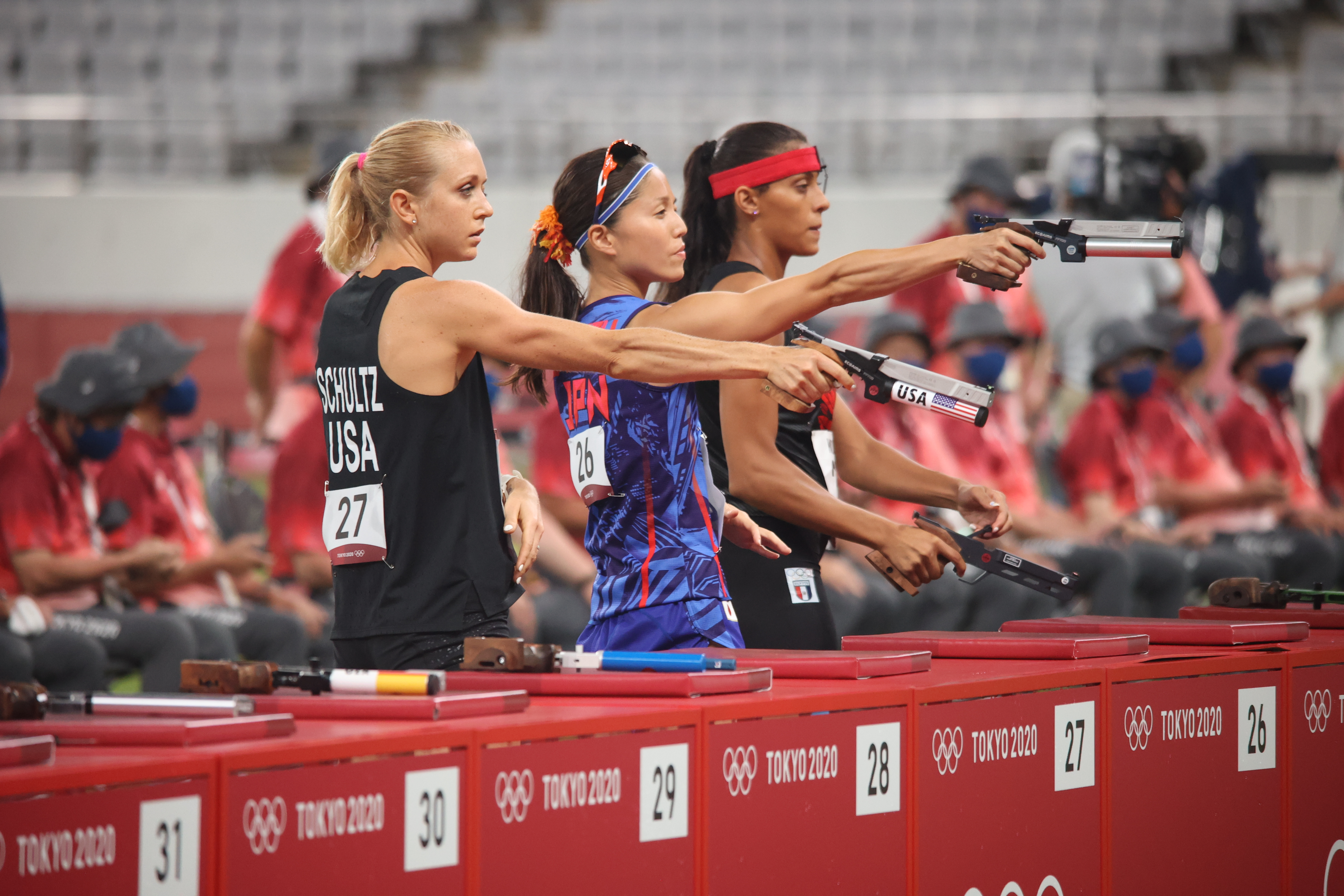
Amira Kandil in the modern pentathlon archery competition.

Haydy Morsy was granted qualification status following her victory at the 2019 African Championships in Cairo. In the case of Amira Kandil, she was granted the opportunity to participate following the initial qualifiers' declination to do so. She was thus able to qualify as the next in line in the International Federation's ranking for her category.

Athlete	Fencing One Touch Sword			Swimming 200m Freestyle			Equestrianism (Jumping Show) and Running 3000m			Shooting ( 10m Air Gun ) and Running 3200m			Total Points	Final Rank
Athlete	Points	Rank	Points MP	Points	Rank	Points MP	Mistakes	Rank	Points MP	Points	Rank	Points MP	Total Points	Final Rank
Amira Kandil	-18 17	21	199	2:15.14	16	280	50	25	250	13:28.34	32	492	1221	29
Haydy Morsy	-20 15	10	221	2:24.35	33	262	7	6	293	13:07.69	25	513	1289	19

=== Sailing ===
Athlete	Event	Preliminary											Final	
Athlete	Event	1	2	3	4	5	6	7	8	9	10	Rank	Score	Rank
Khouloud Mansy	Radial Laser Boat	36	39	43	42	43	36	~~45~~	40	36	32	-	347	41

=== Shooting ===
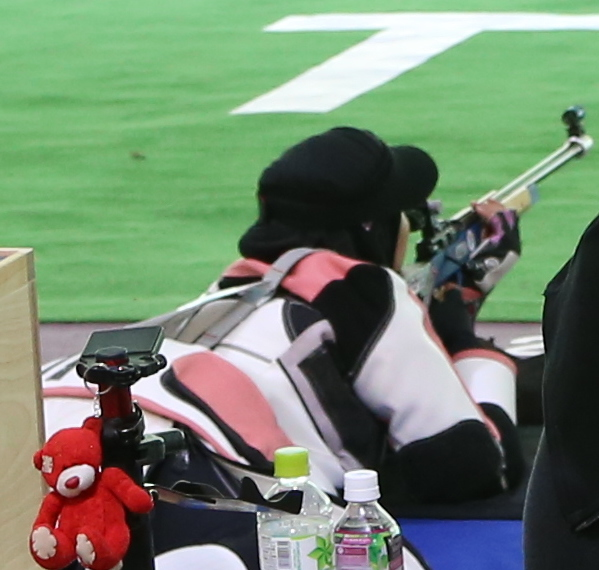
Zahraa Shaaban is participating in the 50-meter rifle 3-position competition.

Athlete	Event	Qualifiers 1		Qualifiers 2		Final	
Athlete	Event	Points	Rank	Points	Rank	Points	Rank
Women
Radwa Abdel Latif	10 Meter Air Pistol	560	40	-		Didn't Advance	
Maggy Ashmawy	Trap	113	22	-		Didn't Advance	
Hala El-Gohari	10 Meter Air Pistol	560	41	-		Didn't Advance	
Alzahraa Shaban	10 meter air gun	620.0	38	-		Didn't Advance	
Alzahraa Shaban	50 meter rifle 3 positions	1138-36x	35	-		Didn't Advance	
Mixed doubles
Alzahraa Shaban	10 meter air gun	617.5	28	Didn't Advance			
Ossama Al-Said	10 meter air gun	617.5	28	Didn't Advance			
Radwa Abdel Latif	10 Meter Air Pistol	563	18	Didn't Advance			
Samy Abdel Razek	10 Meter Air Pistol	563	18	Didn't Advance			
Maggy Ashmawy	Trap	138	15	Didn't Advance			
Abd El Aziz Mahelbh	Trap	138	15	Didn't Advance			

=== Swimming ===
Athlete	Event	Qualifiers		Semifinals		Final	
Athlete	Event	Score	Rank	Score	Rank	Score	Rank
Farida Osman	50 Meter Freestyle	25.13	24	Didn't Advance			
Farida Osman	100 Meter Freestyle	55.74	33	Didn't Advance			
Farida Osman	100 Meter Butterfly	58.69	20	Didn't Advance			

=== Table Tennis ===
Women's team was granted qualification status following their triumph at the 2019 African Games in Rabat, Morocco. This permitted a maximum of two male and two female athletes to participate in the singles competition. Additionally, Egypt was awarded an additional seat in the mixed doubles competition following their victory in the final match against Nigeria at the 2020 African Olympic Qualification Tournament in Tunis, Tunisia.

Athlete	Event	Preliminary	Round 1	Round 2	Round 3	Round of 16	Quarterfinals	Semifinals	Final / BM	
Athlete	Event	Opposition Result	Opposition Result	Opposition Result	Opposition Result	Opposition Result	Opposition Result	Opposition Result	Opposition Result	Rank
Women
Yousra Abdel Razek	Individual	-	France Yuan Jianan 0-4	Didn't Advance						
Dina Meshref	Individual	-		Poland Natalia Bartica 4-2	Netherlands Britt Erland 3-4	Didn't Advance				
Farah Abd Al-Aziz	Team	-				Romania 0-3	Didn't Advance			
Yousra Abdel Razek	Team	-				Romania 0-3	Didn't Advance			
Dina Meshref	Team	-				Romania 0-3	Didn't Advance			
Mixed doubles
Dina Meshref	Pair	-				South Korea Lee Sang-soo/Jeon Ji-hee 1-4	Didn't Advance			
Omar Assar	Pair	-				South Korea Lee Sang-soo/Jeon Ji-hee 1-4	Didn't Advance			

=== Taekwondo ===
Egyptian participation in this session included two taekwondo athletes: Nour Abdel Salam, competing in the women's 49 kg category, and Hedaya Malak, competing in the women's 67 kg category. Abdel Salam had previously won the semifinals of the African Olympic Qualifying Tournament in Rabat, while Malak had won the bronze medal at the 2016 Rio Olympics.

Athlete	Event	Round of 16	Quarterfinals	Semifinals	Appeasement	Final / BM	
Athlete	Event	Opposition Result	Opposition Result	Opposition Result	Opposition Result	Opposition Result	Rank
Nour Abdelsalam	-49 kg	Turkey Rukiye Yildirim 20-21	Didn't Advance				
Hedaya Malak	-67 kg	France Magda Witte-Hénin 11-10	Great Britain Lauren Williams 12-13	Tonga Malia Pasika 19-0	Tonga Malia Pasika 19-0	United States Paige McPherson 17-6	3rd place, bronze medalist(s)

=== Tennis ===
In 2020, Egypt made its inaugural appearance in the tennis competition at the Olympic Games in Tokyo. Mayar Sherif, who had secured the gold medal in the women's singles event at the 2019 African Games in Rabat, Morocco, was the nation's representative in this category.

Athlete	Event	Round of 64	Round of 32	Round of 16	Quarterfinals	Semifinals	Final / BM	
Athlete	Event	Opposition Result	Opposition Result	Opposition Result	Opposition Result	Opposition Result	Opposition Result	Rank
Mayar Sherif	Individual	Sweden Rebecca Pettersson (5-7 | 6-7^{(1–7)}	Didn't Advance					

=== Triathlon ===
In a historic first for the Egyptian Olympic contingent, Basmla ElSalamoney participated in the triathlon.

Athlete	Swimming 1.5 K	Cycling 40 K	Running 10 K	Total Time	Rank
Basmla ElSalamoney	20.41	Didn't Advance			

=== Freestyle wrestling ===
Athlete	Event	Round of 16	Quarterfinals	Semifinals	Final / BM	
Athlete	Event	Opposition Result	Opposition Result	Opposition Result	Opposition Result	Rank
Enas Mostafa	-68 kg	Germany Anna Schell 0–7	Didn't Advance			
Samar Amer	-76 kg		Didn't Advance			

== Sports ==
Sports	Count of players	Seasons										Number of Rounds	Medals		
Sports	Count of players	1984	1988	1992	1996	2000	2004	2008	2012	2016	2020	Number of Rounds	1st place, gold medalist(s)	2nd place, silver medalist(s)	3rd place, bronze medalist(s)
Karate	3										1st place, gold medalist(s) 3rd place, bronze medalist(s)	1	1	0	1
Sailing	1										●	1	0	0	0
Tennis	1										●	1	0	0	0
Trampoline gymnastics	1										●	1	0	0	0
Marathon swimming	1									●		1	0	0	0
Triathlon	1										●	1	0	0	0
Volleyball	2									●		1	0	0	0
Athletics	2						●			●		2	0	0	0
Badminton	2									●	●	2	0	0	0
Track cyclist	1									●	●	2	0	0	0
Canoe sprint	2									●	●	2	0	0	0
Rhythmic gymnastics	4							●	●	●	●	4	0	0	0
Wrestling	4							●	●	●	●	4	0	0	0
Judo	2				●	●	●	●				5	0	0	0
Modern pentathlon	4						●	●	●	●	●	5	0	0	0
Shooting	6						●	●	●	●	●	5	0	0	0
Weightlifting	8					●	●	3rd place, bronze medalist(s)	2nd place, silver medalist(s)	3rd place, bronze medalist(s)		5	0	1	2
Taekwondo	7					●	●	●	●	3rd place, bronze medalist(s)	3rd place, bronze medalist(s)	6	0	0	2
Fencing	13					●	●	●	●	●	●	6	0	0	0
Archery	13	●				●	●	●	●	●	●	7	0	0	0
Diving	3	●								●	●	3	0	0	0
Synchronized swimming	34	●				●	●	●	●	●	●	7	0	0	0
Table Tennis	10		●	●		●		●	●	●	●	7	0	0	0
Swimming	5	●		●	●	●	●		●	●	●	8	0	0	0
Total	143	4	1	3	2	9	11	13	14	18	21	10	1	1	5

=== Seasons ===
Seasons	Number of women from Egypt	Number of women from all countries	Percentage of representation Egyptian women	Number of men From Egypt	Percentage of female representation in the Egyptian mission
1896	0	0	-	0	-
1900	0	23	0.00%	0	-
1904	0	6	0.00%	0	-
1906	0	6	0.00%	2	0.00%
1908	0	44	0.00%	0	-
1912	0	53	0.00%	0	-
1920	0	78	0.00%	18	0.00%
1924	0	156	0.00%	24	0.00%
1928	0	312	0.00%	32	0.00%
1932	0	202	0.00%	0	-
1936	0	360	0.00%	53	0.00%
1948	0	445	0.00%	85	0.00%
1952	0	521	0.00%	106	0.00%
1956	0	371	0.00%	0	-
1960	0	613	0.00%	0	-
1964	0	680	0.00%	73	0.00%
1968	0	783	0.00%	30	0.00%
1972	0	1060	0.00%	23	0.00%
1976	0	1260	0.00%	26	0.00%
1980	0	1123	0.00%	0	-
1988	1	2202	0.05%	48	2.04%
1996	2	3520	0.06%	27	6.90%
1992	3	2721	0.11%	72	4.00%
2000	5	4068	0.12%	74	6.33%
1984	6	1567	0.38%	108	5.26%
2004	16	4304	0.37%	81	16.49%
2008	27	4611	0.59%	74	26.73%
2012	34	4655	0.73%	75	31.19%
2016	37	5037	0.73%	84	30.58%
2020	48	5405	0.89%	89	35.04%

== See also ==
- Egypt at the Olympics
- List of Olympic women for Egypt
- Participation of women in the Olympics
