= Egypt at the 2015 World Aquatics Championships =

- Flag of Egypt
- World Aquatics code: EGY
- National federation: Egyptian Swimming Federation
- Website: www.esf-eg.org

in Kazan, Russia
- Competitors: 29 in 4 sports
- Medals: Gold 0 Silver 0 Bronze 0 Total 0

World Aquatics Championships appearances
- 1973; 1975; 1978; 1982; 1986; 1991; 1994; 1998; 2001; 2003; 2005; 2007; 2009; 2011; 2013; 2015; 2017; 2019; 2022; 2023; 2024; 2025

Egypt competed at the 2015 World Aquatics Championships in Kazan, Russia from 24 July to 9 August 2015.

== Diving ==
Egyptian divers qualified for the individual spots and synchronized teams at the World Championships.

Men

Athlete	Event	Preliminaries		Semifinals		Final	
Athlete	Event	Points	Rank	Points	Rank	Points	Rank
Youssef Ezzat	1 m springboard	233.35	39	—N/a		did not advance	
Emadeldin Abdellatif	3 m springboard	313.50	52	did not advance			
Mohab El-Kordy	3 m springboard	320.25	47	did not advance			
Youssef Ezzat	10 m platform	282.50	45	did not advance			
Mohab El-Kordy	10 m platform	276.90	46	did not advance			
Emadeldin Abdellatif; Youssef Ezzat	3 m synchronized springboard	320.13	20	—N/a		did not advance	

Women

Athlete	Event	Preliminaries		Semifinals		Final	
Athlete	Event	Points	Rank	Points	Rank	Points	Rank
Maha Abdelsalam	1 m springboard	203.45	31	—N/a		did not advance	
Maha Abdelsalam	3 m springboard	198.10	45	did not advance			
Maha Abdelsalam	10 m platform	280.75	29	did not advance			
Habiba Ashraf	1 m springboard	201.65	32	—N/a		did not advance	
Habiba Ashraf	3 m springboard	215.65	41	did not advance			

Mixed

Athlete	Event	Final	
Athlete	Event	Points	Rank
Mohab El-Kordy; Maha Abdelsalam	10 m synchronized platform	207.63	20
Mohab El-Kordy; Maha Abdelsalam	Team	310.60	14

== Open water swimming ==
Egypt fielded a full team of four swimmers to compete in the open water marathon.

Athlete	Event	Time	Rank
Youssef Hossameldeen	Men's 10 km	1:54:22.5	49
Adel Ragab	Men's 10 km	1:55:41.5	50
Reem Kaseem	Women's 10 km	2:09:22.3	43
Mariam Sakr	Women's 10 km	OTL	
Youssef Hossameldeen; Reem Kaseem; Adel Ragab	Mixed team	1:02:13.1	21

== Swimming ==
Egyptian swimmers have achieved qualifying standards in the following events (up to a maximum of 2 swimmers in each event at the A-standard entry time, and 1 at the B-standard):

Men

Athlete	Event	Heat		Semifinal		Final	
Athlete	Event	Time	Rank	Time	Rank	Time	Rank
Ahmed Akram	400 m freestyle	3:48.07	15	—N/a		did not advance	
Ahmed Akram	800 m freestyle	7:49.83	9	—N/a		did not advance	
Ahmed Akram	1500 m freestyle	14:55.42	5 Q	—N/a		14:53.66	4
Omar Eissa	50 m butterfly	24.63	40	did not advance			
Omar Eissa	100 m butterfly	53.68	=35	did not advance			
Marwan El-Kamash	200 m freestyle	1:47.87	17	did not advance			
Marwan El-Kamash	400 m freestyle	3:48.15	16	—N/a		did not advance	
Youssef El-Kamash	50 m breaststroke	28.05	27	did not advance			
Youssef El-Kamash	100 m breaststroke	1:02.01	35	did not advance			
Mohamed Hussein	50 m backstroke	26.42	=40	did not advance			
Mohamed Hussein	100 m backstroke	55.85	36	did not advance			
Mohamed Hussein	200 m individual medley	2:00.22 NR	16 Q	2:01.41	16	did not advance	
Ali Khalafalla	50 m freestyle	22.88	=33	did not advance			
Ali Khalafalla	100 m freestyle	50.84	53	did not advance			
Ahmed Hamdy Salem	400 m individual medley	4:23.02	29	—N/a		did not advance	
Omar Eissa; Mohamed Hussein; Marwan El-Kamash; Ali Khalafalla	4×100 m freestyle relay	3:20.59	20	—N/a		did not advance	
Marwan El-Kamash; Mohamed Hussein; Akram Ahmed; Ahmed Hamdy Salem	4×200 m freestyle relay	7:21.86	20	—N/a		did not advance	
Mohamed Hussein; Youssef El-Kamash; Omar Eissa; Marwan El-Kamash	4×100 m medley relay	3:41.97	21	—N/a		did not advance	

Women

Athlete	Event	Heat		Semifinal		Final	
Athlete	Event	Time	Rank	Time	Rank	Time	Rank
Mai Atef	50 m breaststroke	32.14	36	did not advance			
Farida Osman	50 m freestyle	25.22	=19	did not advance			
Farida Osman	100 m freestyle	55:46	26	did not advance			
Farida Osman	50 m butterfly	26.33	=12 Q	25.88 AF	6 Q	25.78 AF	5
Farida Osman	100 m butterfly	58.48 NR	=16	did not advance			

== Synchronized swimming ==
Egypt has qualified a team of eleven synchronized swimmers to compete in each of the following events.

Women

Athlete	Event	Preliminaries		Final	
Athlete	Event	Points	Rank	Points	Rank
Reem Abdalazem	Solo technical routine	74.2780	19	did not advance	
Reem Abdalazem	Solo free routine	76.1667	19	did not advance	
Samia Ahmed; Dara Hassanien	Duet technical routine	75.1661	23	did not advance	
Samia Ahmed; Dara Hassanien	Duet free routine	77.0667	22	did not advance	
Narimah Abdelhafiz; Leila Abdelmoez*; Salma Ahmed; Samia Ahmed; Jomana El-Maghrabi; Dara Hassanien; Nour Mounir; Zolfeya Mostafa*; Nada Saafan; Neha Saafan	Team technical routine	73.6496	17	did not advance	
Narimah Abdelhafiz; Leila Abdelmoez*; Salma Ahmed; Samia Ahmed; Jomana El-Maghrabi; Dara Hassanien; Nour Mounir; Zolfeya Mostafa*; Nada Saafan; Neha Saafan	Team free routine	77.7000	15	did not advance	
