= Egypt at the 2011 World Aquatics Championships =

- Flag of Egypt
- FINA code: EGY
- National federation: Egyptian Swimming Federation

in Shanghai, China
- Competitors: 15 in 3 sports
- Medals: Gold 0 Silver 0 Bronze 0 Total 0

World Aquatics Championships appearances
- 1973; 1975; 1978; 1982; 1986; 1991; 1994; 1998; 2001; 2003; 2005; 2007; 2009; 2011; 2013; 2015; 2017; 2019; 2022; 2023; 2024

Egypt competed at the 2011 World Aquatics Championships in Shanghai, China between July 16 and 31, 2011.

== Open water swimming ==
Men

Athlete	Event	Final	
Athlete	Event	Time	Position
Islam Mohsen	Men's 5km	1:06:21.6	45
Islam Mohsen	Men's 10km	2:11:37.2	52
Islam Mohsen	Men's 25km	DNS	
Mazen Mohamed Aziz	Men's 5km	DSQ	
Mazen Mohamed Aziz	Men's 10km	2:03:52.4	48
Mazen Mohamed Aziz	Men's 25km	DNS	

Women

Athlete	Event	Final	
Athlete	Event	Time	Position
Merna Mohamed	Women's 5km	1:10:23.4	39
Merna Mohamed	Women's 10km	DNF	
Lalila El Basiouny	Women's 5km	1:06:15.3	37
Lalila El Basiouny	Women's 10km	2:20:15.4	49

Mixed

Athlete	Event	Final	
Athlete	Event	Time	Position
Mazen Mohamed Aziz; Islam Mohsen; Laila El Basiouny	Team	1:06:03.4	14

== Swimming ==
Egypt qualified 3 swimmers.

Men

Athlete	Event	Heats		Semifinals		Final	
Athlete	Event	Time	Rank	Time	Rank	Time	Rank
Shebab Younis	Men's 50m Freestyle	23.17	38	did not advance			
Shebab Younis	Men's 100m Freestyle	51.95	53	did not advance			
Mohamed Farhoud	Men's 400m Freestyle	3:55.32	28			did not advance	
Mohamed Farhoud	Men's 800m Freestyle	8:10.35	29			did not advance	

Women

Athlete	Event	Heats		Semifinals		Final	
Athlete	Event	Time	Rank	Time	Rank	Time	Rank
Shahd Osman	Women's 400m Freestyle	4:26.35	34			did not advance	
Shahd Osman	Women's 800m Freestyle	9:01.84	29			did not advance	

== Synchronised swimming ==
Egypt has qualified 11 athletes in synchronised swimming.

Women

Athlete	Event	Preliminary		Final	
Athlete	Event	Points	Rank	Points	Rank
Jomana Mohamed	Solo Technical Routine	73.400	26	did not advance	
Reem Abdalazem; Dalia El-Gebaly	Duet Technical Routine	75.600	28	did not advance	
Reem Abdalazem; Dalia El-Gebaly	Duet Free Routine	76.040	30	did not advance	
Reem Abdalazem; Shaza Abdelrahman; Nour El-Afandi; Dalia El-Gebaly; Samar Hassounah; Youmna Khallaf; Aziza Mahmoud Mohamed; Mariam Omar	Team Technical Routine	77.100	17	did not advance	
Reem Abdalazem; Shaza Abdelrahman; Aya Darwish; Nour El-Afandi; Dalia El-Gebaly; Youmna Khallaf; Aziza Mahmoud Mohamed; Mariam Omar	Team Free Routine	78.200	15	did not advance	

Reserve

- Hana Khaled Ali
