= Egypt at the 2013 World Aquatics Championships =

- Flag of Egypt
- FINA code: EGY
- National federation: Egyptian Swimming Federation
- Website: www.esf-eg.org

in Barcelona, Spain
- Competitors: 25 in 3 sports
- Medals: Gold 0 Silver 0 Bronze 0 Total 0

World Aquatics Championships appearances
- 1973; 1975; 1978; 1982; 1986; 1991; 1994; 1998; 2001; 2003; 2005; 2007; 2009; 2011; 2013; 2015; 2017; 2019; 2022; 2023; 2024

Egypt is competing at the 2013 World Aquatics Championships in Barcelona, Spain on July 20 to August 4, 2013.

== Open water swimming ==
Egypt has qualified the following swimmers in open water marathon.

Men

| Athlete | Event | Time | Rank |
|---|---|---|---|
| Abdelrahman Esam | 25 km | 5:33:35.7 | 32 |
| Youssef Hossameldeen | 5 km | 57:08.5 | 40 |
| Youssef Hossameldeen | 10 km | 2:03:05.3 | 54 |
| Adel Ragab | 5 km | 54:20.4 | 36 |
| Adel Ragab | 10 km | DNF | |

Women

| Athlete | Event | Time | Rank |
|---|---|---|---|
| Laila El-Basiouny | 5 km | 1:01:52.4 | 40 |
| Laila El-Basiouny | 10 km | 2:04:45.4 | 41 |
| Wasela Hussein | 5 km | 1:03:02.2 | 36 |
| Wasela Hussein | 25 km | OTL | |

Mixed

| Athlete | Event | Time | Rank |
|---|---|---|---|
| Youssef Hossameldeen; Adel Ragab; Laila El-Basiouny | Team | 1:01:02.2 | 21 |

== Swimming ==
Egyptian swimmers earned qualifying standards in the following events (up to a maximum of 2 swimmers in each event at the A-standard entry time, and 1 at the B-standard):

Men

| Athlete | Event | Heat | | Semifinal | | Final | |
| Athlete | Event | Time | Rank | Time | Rank | Time | Rank |
|---|---|---|---|---|---|---|---|
| Ahmed Akram | 800 m freestyle | 8:08.73 | 26 | — | | Did not advance | |
| Ahmed Akram | 1500 m freestyle | 15:27.60 | 26 | — | | Did not advance | |
| Marwan Adel | 100 m butterfly | 54.39 | 37 | Did not advance | | | |
| Marwan Ismail | 200 m freestyle | 1:49.33 NR | 29 | Did not advance | | | |
| Marwan Ismail | 400 m freestyle | 3:53.80 NR | 24 | — | | Did not advance | |
| Mohamed Gadallah | 400 m individual medley | 4:32.95 | 36 | — | | Did not advance | |
| Mohamed Khaled | 50 m backstroke | 26.44 | 31 | Did not advance | | | |
| Mohamed Khaled | 200 m individual medley | 2:02.29 NR | 29 | Did not advance | | | |
| Shehab Younis | 50 m freestyle | 23.49 | 49 | Did not advance | | | |
| Shehab Younis | 50 m butterfly | 24.70 | 39 | Did not advance | | | |
| Ahmed Akram; Shehab Younis; Mohamed Khaled; Marwan Elkamash | 4×100 m freestyle relay | 3:26.25 | 16 | — | | Did not advance | |
| Ahmed Akram; Mohamed Gadallah; Mohamed Khaled; Marwan Elkamash | 4×200 m freestyle relay | 7:31.60 NR | 15 | — | | Did not advance | |
| Marwan Adel; Mohamed Gadallah; Marwan Elkamash; Mohamed Khaled | 4×100 m medley relay | 3:46.31 NR | 22 | — | | Did not advance | |

Women

| Athlete | Event | Heat | | Semifinal | | Final | |
| Athlete | Event | Time | Rank | Time | Rank | Time | Rank |
|---|---|---|---|---|---|---|---|
| Mai Atef | 50 m breaststroke | 33.08 | 46 | Did not advance | | | |
| Farida Osman | 50 m freestyle | DNS | | Did not advance | | | |
| Farida Osman | 100 m freestyle | 56.84 | 39 | Did not advance | | | |
| Farida Osman | 50 m butterfly | 26.45 | =11 Q | 26.12 AF | =7 Q | 26.17 | 7 |
| Farida Osman | 100 m butterfly | 59.85 | 24 | Did not advance | | | |

== Synchronized swimming ==
Egypt has qualified twelve synchronized swimmers.

| Athlete | Event | Preliminaries | | Final | |
| Athlete | Event | Points | Rank | Points | Rank |
|---|---|---|---|---|---|
| Reem Wail | Solo free routine | 77.950 | 20 | Did not advance | |
| Reem Wail | Solo technical routine | 77.200 | 19 | Did not advance | |
| Jomana Mohamed; Aya Darwish | Duet free routine | 74.990 | 22 | Did not advance | |
| Youmna Amr; Aya Darwish; Samia Hagras; Jomana Mohamed; Leila Mohamed; Mariam Rizk; Dara Tamer; Shaza Yehia | Team technical routine | 77.00 | 14 | Did not advance | |
| Youmna Amr; Aya Darwish; Samia Hagras; Jomana Mohamed; Leila Mohamed; Mariam Rizk; Dara Tamer; Shaza Yehia | Team free routine | 76.460 | 14 | Did not advance | |

Reserves

- Nour Elayoubi
- Nehal Nabil
- Salma Sherif
