= Shaza El-Sayed =

Egyptian synchronized swimmer

Personal information
- Nationality: Egyptian
- Born: Shaza Yehia Nazih Abdelrahman El-Sayed; 23 December 1992 (age 33) Cairo, Egypt
- Height: 1.70 m (5 ft 7 in)
- Weight: 61 kg (134 lb)

Sport
- Country: Egypt
- Sport: Synchronised swimming
- Club: Heliopolis Sporting Club

Shaza Yehia Nazih Abdelrahman El-Sayed (Arabic: شذى يحيي نزيه عبد الرحمن السيد; born 23 December 1992 in Cairo, Egypt) is an Egyptian synchronised swimmer who competed in the 2008 Summer Olympics and 2012 Summer Olympics.

== Personal life ==
Shaza El-Sayed was born in Cairo, Egypt on 23 December 1992. As of 2013, she is 1.70 m (5 ft 7 in) and weighs 61 kg (134 lb).

== Synchronised swimming ==
El-Sayed made her Olympic debut at the 2008 Summer Olympics, held in Beijing. In the Technical Team event, she came 8th with 39.750 points, and in the Free Team event she came 8th with 40.083 points.

In 2009, El-Sayed and Dalia El-Gebaly competed at the 2009 FINA Synchro World Trophy in the Thematic Duet event. The routine placed 10th out of a field of ten duets, with a score of 85.000.

In 2011, she competed at the 2011 World Aquatics Championships, in the Team event. In the Technical Team event, she came 17th with a score of 77.000, and in Free Team came 15th with a score of 78.200.

In 2012, El-Sayed and Dalia El-Gebaly were selected to represent Egypt in Duet and Team at the 2012 Summer Olympics. In the Technical Duet event, El-Sayed came 24th with a score of 75.700, and in the Free Duet event came 24th with a score of 76.400. Their combined score of 152.100 did not advance the pair to the final. She also competed in the Team event, along with Reem Abdalazem, Nour El-Afandi, Dalia El-Gebaly, Samar Hassounah, Youmna Khallaf, Mai Mohamed, Mariam Omar and Aya Darwish. The Egyptian team finished 7th in the technical team event with a score of 77.600, and 7th in the free team event with a score of 78.360, which was the country's best ever result.

In 2013, she competed at the 2013 FINA World Championships in synchronised swimming. In the Technical Team event, she came 14th with a score of 77.000, and in the Free Team event, she came 14th with a score of 76.460. In the same year, she also competed in the FINA Synchro World Trophy in the Free Team, along with Leila Abdelfattah, Nour Elayoubi, Samia Hagras, Aya Ibrahim, Dara Mahmoud, Salma Negmeldin, Mariam Rizk, Jomana El-Maghrabi and Nehal El-Sayed, scoring 87.333 points. She also competed in the Synchro Highlight Routine, earning 85.500 points.
