= Abdel Gawad =

Abdel Gawad (Arabic: عبد الجواد) is an Egyptian surname.

Notable people with this surname include:

- Ahmed Abdel Gawad (died 2013), journalist, victim in the August 2013 Rabaa massacre
- Heba Abdel Gawad (born 1982), Egyptian swimmer
- Karim Abdel Gawad (born 1991), Egyptian squash player
- Sara Abdel Gawad (born 1982), Egyptian swimmer
- Zakaria Abdel Gawad, Egyptian novelist and journalist
