= 2021 Modern Pentathlon Youth World Championships =

- Location: Alexandria, Egypt
- Dates: 12–19 September

The 2021 Modern Pentathlon Youth World Championships was held from 12 to 19 September 2021 in Alexandria, Egypt. It was the inaugural edition of the competition.

== Medal table ==
* Host nation (Egypt)

Rank	Nation	Gold	Silver	Bronze	Total
1	Russia	5	3	3	11
2	Belarus	4	2	2	8
3	Egypt*	3	4	3	10
4	Hungary	2	1	3	6
5	Poland	0	2	0	2
6	France	0	1	1	2
6	Lithuania	0	1	1	2
8	Italy	0	0	1	1
Totals (8 entries)		14	14	14	42

== Medal summary ==
=== Men's U17 ===
Event	Gold		Silver		Bronze	
Individual	Botond Tamás; Hungary	944	Mohamed Mohamed; Egypt	943	Lukas Gaudiešius; Lithuania	943
Team	Russia; Egor Zorkin; Timofei Popov; Maksim Malyshev	2802	Egypt; Mohamed Mohamed; Osama Zaki; Yassin El Hady	2769	Hungary; Botond Tamás; Ákos Tóth; Zalán Jassó	2760
Relay	Russia; Egor Zorkin; Maksim Malyshev	994	Lithuania; Lukas Gaudiešius; Nojus Chmieliauskas	979	Egypt; Mohamed Mohamed; Osama Zaki	961

=== Women's U17 ===
Event	Gold		Silver		Bronze	
Individual	Mira Buraya; Belarus	860	Elizaveta Skudnyakova; Russia	857	Blanka Bauer; Hungary	854
Team	Belarus; Mira Buraya; Aliaksandra Liashenka; Lizaveta Laurynovich	2558	Hungary; Blanka Bauer; Zóra Zemán; Linda Haraszin	2504	Russia; Iulia Barovkova; Elizaveta Skudnyakova; Olesya Khamidullina	2481
Relay	Belarus; Aliaksandra Liashenka; Lizaveta Laurynovich	883	Poland; Małgorzata Karbownik; Maja Marcinkowska	870	Russia; Iulia Barovkova; Elizaveta Skudnyakova	864

=== Mixed U17 ===
Event	Gold		Silver		Bronze	
Relay	Hungary; Botond Tamás; Blanka Bauer	935	Belarus; Vasili Plazakou; Mira Buraya	929	Italy; Matteo Bovenzi; Elisa Sala	921

=== Men's U19 ===
Event	Gold		Silver		Bronze	
Individual	Kirill Manuilo; Russia	1190	Cedric Chatellier; France	1179	Moutaz Mohamed; Egypt	1170
Team	Russia; Kirill Manuilo; Matvei Ivanov-Kunitskii; Murat Guchakov	3446	Egypt; Moutaz Mohamed; Mazen Shaban; Seif Elbendary	3402	France; Cedric Chatellier; Emilien Maire; Enzo Clerc	3384
Relay	Egypt; Mazen Shaban; Moutaz Mohamed	1212	Belarus; Uladzislau Melkaziorau; Uladzislau Zhartun	1209	Russia; Kirill Manuilo; Vladimir Zeleputin	1208

=== Women's U19 ===
Event	Gold		Silver		Bronze	
Individual	Amira Kandil; Egypt	1070	Yana Soloveva; Russia	1068	Anastasiya Malashenoka; Belarus	1035
Team	Russia; Yana Soloveva; Viktoriia Sazonova; Kristina Budeikina	3086	Egypt; Malak Ismail; Amira Kandil; Zeina Amer	3063	Belarus; Anastasiya Malashenoka; Palina Anikeynka; Maryia Gnedtchik	3045
Relay	Egypt; Malak Ismail; Amira Kandil	1114	Russia; Yana Soloveva; Viktoriia Sazonova	1112	Hungary; Dorina Dobronyi; Réka Marschall	1071

=== Mixed U19 ===
Event	Gold		Silver		Bronze	
Relay	Belarus; Ivan Prytkou; Anastasiya Malashenoka	1186	Poland; Maciej Klimek; Adrianna Kapała	1165	Egypt; Moutaz Mohamed; Amira Kandil	1147
