= Nevine Hafez =

Egyptian swimmer

Personal information
- Born: 3 August 1968 (age 57)

Sport
- Sport: Swimming

Nevine Hafez (born 3 August 1968) is an Egyptian swimmer. She competed in two events at the 1984 Summer Olympics. She was the first woman to represent Egypt at the Olympics.
