= Rania Elwani =

Egyptian swimmer (born 1977)

Personal information
- Full name: Rania Amr Mostafa Elwani رانیا عمرو مصطفي علواني
- Nationality: Egypt
- Born: 14 October 1977 (age 48) Giza, Egypt
- Height: 1.78 m (5 ft 10 in)
- Weight: 75 kg (165 lb)

Sport
- Sport: Swimming
- Club: Al Ahly SC
- College team: SMU Mustangs (USA)
Medal record
Women's swimming
Representing Egypt
All-Africa Games
Gold medal – first place	1999 Johannesburg	50 m freestyle
Bronze medal – third place	1999 Johannesburg	100 m freestyle
Bronze medal – third place	1999 Johannesburg	200 m freestyle

Dr. Rania Elwani (Egyptian Arabic: رانيا علوانى; born 14 October 1977) is an Egyptian Olympic and former African Record holding swimmer. She swam for Egypt at 1992, 1996 and 2000 Olympics.

== Education ==
She attended and swam for the USA's Southern Methodist University from 1997 to 1999. She later obtained a Bachelor of Medicine and Surgery from Misr University for Science and Technology in 2004, and a Master of Obstetrics and Gynaecology from Ain Shams University in 2014. She also had a Sports Management Diploma from the International Centre for Sports Studies, Switzerland in September 2009, and a Healthcare and Hospital Management Diploma from the American University in Cairo in 2015.

== Career ==
During her studies at Southern Methodist University, she swam for the Mustangs in the 50m and 100m freestyle events. Her best times of 22.44 seconds in 1998 and 48.58 seconds in 1999 are the 6th and 5th all-time best records for the Mustangs Swimming team as of January 2025. In 2004, she became a member of the International Olympic Committee. In 2010, she became a member of the Athlete Committee of the World Anti-Doping Agency (WADA).

She is a member of the 'Champions for Peace' club, a group of more than 90 elite created by Peace and Sport, a Monaco-based international organization placed under the High Patronage of H.S.H Prince Albert II. This group of top level champions, wish to make sport a tool for dialogue and social cohesion.

== Awards ==
- (Egypt) Order of Merit of First Class for Sports
- Egypt's Athlete of the year: 1991–1998
- Arab Athlete of the Games, Jordan: 1999
- The Arab Sports Federations Order of Merit for Sport: 1997
- (United Arab Emirates) The Sheikh Mohammed Bin Rashid Award for Sports Excellence: 2014
- The International Fairplay Award, Italy: 2010
