= Rim Hassan =

Egyptian diver

Personal information
- Native name: ريم حسن
- National team: Egypt
- Born: December 3, 1968 (age 56)

Sport
- Country: Egypt
- Sport: Diving
- Updated on 25 July 2017

Rim Hassan (Arabic: ريم حسن; born December 3, 1968) is an Egyptian Olympic diver. She represented Egypt in 1984 Summer Olympics in Los Angeles.

== Olympic participation ==
=== Los Angeles 1984 ===
Hassan was the youngest and the only female participants for Egypt's diving team in that tournament aged only 15 years and 246 days then.

Diving – Women's 3 metre springboard

Rim Hassan (EGY)
Qualifying
Qualifying Dive #	Points										Rank
Qualifying Dive #	DP	J1S	J2S	J3S	J4S	J5S	J6S	J7S	DOD	DC#	Rank
#1	22.56	4.5	5.0	6.0	4.5	4.5	4.5	5.0	1.6	0101A	24
#2	25.92	4.5	5.0	5.0	4.5	5.0	4.0	5.0	1.8	0201B	24
#3	22.23	4.0	4.0	4.0	4.0	3.5	4.0	3.0	1.9	0301B	23
#4	20.58	4.5	4.5	5.0	5.0	5.0	5.0	5.0	1.4	0401B	24
#5	25.80	3.5	5.0	5.5	4.0	3.5	4.5	4.5	2.0	5111A	24
#6	34.32	5.5	5.5	5.5	4.5	4.5	5.0	5.5	2.2	0105C	24
#7	25.08	3.0	3.5	4.0	3.5	4.0	4.0	4.0	2.2	0203B	23
#8	33.00	5.5	5.5	5.5	5.5	5.5	6.0	5.5	2.0	0303C	22
#9	18.90	2.5	3.5	4.0	3.0	3.0	2.0	3.0	2.1	0403B	24
#10	30.24	5.5	5.0	5.0	4.5	5.0	4.0	4.5	2.1	5132D	24
Summary	258.63	43	46.5	49.5	43	43.5	43	45	19.3	-	24th
Final
Final Dive #	Points										Rank
Final Dive #	DP	J1S	J2S	J3S	J4S	J5S	J6S	J7S	DOD	DC#	Rank
Summary	DNQ										
Final Standing
Rank	24th										

Diving – Women's 10 metre platform

Rim Hassan (EGY)
Qualifying
Qualifying Dive #	Points										Rank
Qualifying Dive #	DP	J1S	J2S	J3S	J4S	J5S	J6S	J7S	DOD	DC#	Rank
#1	20.16	3.5	3.0	4.5	4.0	5.0	4.5	4.5	1.6	0103B	21
#2	15.66	1.5	3.0	3.0	3.0	2.5	3.0	3.0	1.8	0201B	21
#3	24.51	4.0	4.0	4.0	4.5	4.5	5.0	4.5	1.9	0301B	21
#4	18.00	2.0	3.0	3.5	3.0	2.5	3.0	4.0	2.0	0403B	21
#5	19.32	2.5	3.0	2.5	2.5	3.0	3.5	3.0	2.3	0105B	21
#6	21.00	2.0	2.5	3.0	2.5	3.0	3.0	3.5	2.5	0405C	20
#7	14.49	2.0	2.5	2.0	2.0	3.0	2.5	2.5	2.1	5132D	21
#8	13.80	1.5	2.5	3.5	2.5	2.0	2.0	2.5	2.0	0303C	20
Summary	146.94	19	23.5	26	24	25.5	26.5	27.5	16.2	-	21st
Final
Final Dive #	Points										Rank
Final Dive #	DP	J1S	J2S	J3S	J4S	J5S	J6S	J7S	DOD	DC#	Rank
Summary	DNQ										
Final Standing
Rank	21st										
