= Amira Kandil =

Egyptian modern pentathlete

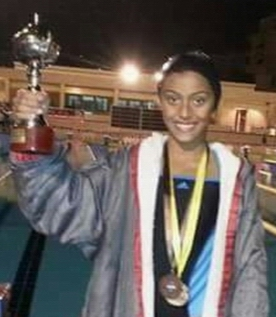

Personal information
- Nationality: Egyptian
- Born: 21 February 2003 (age 23)

Sport
- Sport: Modern pentathlon
Medal record
Women's modern pentathlon
Representing Egypt
World Championships
Gold medal – first place	2022 Alexandria	Relay
Gold medal – first place	2023 Bath	Relay
Silver medal – second place	2024 Zhengzhou	Relay
Modern Pentathlon Youth World Championships
Gold medal – first place	2021 Alexandria	Individual
Gold medal – first place	2021 Alexandria	Relay
Silver medal – second place	2021 Alexandria	Team
Bronze medal – third place	2021 Alexandria	Mixed relay

Amira Kandil (born 21 February 2003) is an Egyptian modern pentathlete. She competed in the women's event at the 2020 Summer Olympics.
