= Menatalla Karim =

Egyptian canoeist

Personal information
- Born: 12 November 1995 (age 30)

Sport
- Sport: Canoe sprint

Menatalla Karim (born 12 November 1995) is an Egyptian canoeist. She competed in the women's K-1 200 metres event at the 2016 Summer Olympics.
