= Sahar Helal =

Egyptian synchronized swimmer

Personal information
- Nationality: Egypt
- Born: 15 April 1969
- Died: 2 May 2004 (aged 35)

Sport
- Sport: Swimming
- Strokes: Synchronized swimming

Sahar Helal (Arabic: سحر هلال; April 15, 1969 – May 2, 2004) was a synchronized swimmer from Egypt. She competed in the women's solo event in synchronized swimming competition at the 1984 Summer Olympics. She was the youngest participant in synchronized swimming event aged 15 years, 116 days then.

== Olympic participation ==
=== Los Angeles 1984 ===
Synchronized Swimming – Women's Solo

Figures
Rank	Country	Athlete	PTS	Result
45	Egypt	Sahar Helal	67.165	DNQ
