= Hebatallah El-Wazan =

Egyptian sports shooter

Personal information
- Native name: هبة الله الوزن
- National team: Egypt
- Born: September 14, 1976 (age 49)

Sport
- Country: Egypt
- Sport: Shooting
Medal record
Women's shooting
Representing Egypt
AFC
Bronze medal – third place	Cairo 1999	AP40
- Updated on 30 July 2017

Hebatallah El-Wazan (Arabic: هبة الله الوزن; born September 14, 1976) is an Egyptian Olympic shooter. She represented Egypt in 2000 in Sydney.

== Olympic participation ==
=== Sydney 2000 ===
Shooting

Hebatallah El-Wazan (EGY)
Event	Round	Points					Rank
Event	Round	R1	R2	R3	R4	Total	Rank
10 metre air pistol	Preliminary Round	96	94	93	96	379	16T
10 metre air pistol	Final Round	DNQ					
Final Standing: 16T
