= Mariam El-Zoheiry =

Egyptian fencer (born 1999)

Personal information
- Nationality: Egypt
- Born: 16 August 1999 (age 26) Alexandria, Egypt
- Height: 170 cm (5 ft 7 in)

Sport
- Sport: Fencing
- Event: Women's team foil

Mariam El-Zoheiry (born 16 August 1999) is an Egyptian fencer. She competed in the 2020 Summer Olympics, in team foil.

She competed at the 2019 U17/U20 African Championships,
