= Nariman Aly =

Egyptian synchronized swimmer

Personal information
- Born: 29 September 1998 (age 27) Cairo, Egypt

Sport
- Sport: Swimming
- Strokes: Synchronised swimming

Nariman Khalid Muhammad Abdulhafiz Aly (born 29 September 1998) is an Egyptian synchronised swimmer. She competed in the team event at the 2016 Summer Olympics.
