= Yasmine Helmi =

Egyptian sport shooter

Yasmine Helmi (born 22 November 1978) is an Egyptian sport shooter. She tied for 28th place in the women's 10 metre air rifle event at the 2000 Summer Olympics.
