= Sherwite Hafez =

Egyptian swimmer (born 1967)

Personal information
- Born: 3 February 1967 (age 59)

Sport
- Sport: Swimming
Medal record
Representing Egypt
African Games
Gold medal – first place	1987 Nairobi	400m freestyle
Silver medal – second place	1987 Nairobi	800m freestyle
Silver medal – second place	1987 Nairobi	100m butterfly
Silver medal – second place	1987 Nairobi	200m butterfly
Bronze medal – third place	1987 Nairobi	200m freestyle
Bronze medal – third place	1987 Nairobi	100m backstroke

Sherwite Hafez (born 3 February 1967) is an Egyptian swimmer. She competed in two events at the 1984 Summer Olympics.
