= Youssef Selim =

Egyptian diver

Personal information
- Full name: Youssef Selim
- Born: 14 December 1997 (age 28) Cairo, Egypt
- Height: 1.65 m (5 ft 5 in)
- Weight: 70 kg (154 lb)

Sport
- Country: Egypt
- Sport: Diving
- Event(s): Springboard, platform
- College team: Arizona State University
- Updated on 29 August 2015

Youssef Selim (born 14 December 1997) is an Egyptian diver. He became one of the first divers to represent Egypt in an Olympic tournament since the country's appearance in Los Angeles thirty-two years earlier, finishing as Africa's top-ranked springboard diver at the 2015 FINA World Championships to secure the country's Olympic berth for Rio 2016. Selim currently trains as a member of the swimming and diving team at the Arizona State University in Tempe, Arizona, under the tutelage of head coach Mark Bradshaw.

Selim was selected by the Egyptian Olympic Committee to compete in the men's 3 m springboard at the 2016 Summer Olympics in Rio de Janeiro. There, he collected a total of 360.95 points to secure a twenty-fifth spot from a pool of 28 registered divers in the prelims stage, failing to advance further to the semifinals.

In January 2022, he became engaged to Montana Gilletti, a diver from Northern Arizona University.
