= Fatma El Sharnouby =

Egyptian middle-distance runner

Fatma El Sharnouby (born November 18, 1997) is an Egyptian middle-distance runner. She competed at the 2016 Summer Olympics in the women's 800 metres race; her time of 2:21.24 in the heats did not qualify her for the semifinals.
