= Dina Hosny =

Egyptian sport shooter

Personal information
- Full name: Dina Hosny Abdel-Aziz
- Nationality: Egypt
- Born: 26 September 1983 (age 42) Cairo, Egypt
- Height: 1.68 m (5 ft 6 in)
- Weight: 55 kg (121 lb)

Sport
- Sport: Shooting
- Event(s): 10 m air rifle (AR40); 50 m rifle 3 positions (STR3X20)
- Club: Egyptian Army Shooting Club
- Coached by: Mohamed Fayek

Dina Hosny Abdel-Aziz (Arabic: دينا حسني; born 26 September 1983 in Cairo) is an Egyptian sport shooter. She has been selected to compete for Egypt in air rifle shooting at the 2004 Summer Olympics, and has won two medals, a silver and bronze, at the African Championships. Hosny trains under head coach Mohamed Fayek for the national shooting team, while serving full-time for the Egyptian Army.

Hosny qualified for the Egyptian squad in the women's 10 m air rifle at the 2004 Summer Olympics in Athens. She managed to get a minimum qualifying standard of 377 from her runner-up finish at the African Championships to fill in one of the Olympic berths available for Egypt, after the Egyptian Shooting Federation had decided to exchange spots in her pet event with the unused quota from the women's air pistol. Hosny fired a modest 391 out of a possible 400 to tie with four other shooters, including Switzerland's five-time Olympian Gaby Bühlmann, for twenty-seventh place in the qualifying round, failing to advance to the final.
