= Rana El Husseiny =

Egyptian foil fencer

Personal information
- Born: 14 September 1991 (age 34)
- Height: 1.70 m (5 ft 7 in)
- Weight: 56 kg (123 lb; 8.8 st)

Fencing career
- Sport: Fencing
- Country: Egypt
- Weapon: Foil
- Hand: Right-handed
- Club: Gezira Sporting Club
- FIE ranking: current ranking

Rana El Husseiny (born 14 September 1991) is an Egyptian foil fencer. She competed in the women's team foil competition at the 2012 Summer Olympics, losing both her matches.
