= Dalia El-Gebaly =

Egyptian synchronized swimmer

Personal information
- Full name: Dalia Muhammad Ahmad El-Gebaly
- Nationality: Egyptian
- Born: 26 March 1992 (age 34) Cairo, Egypt

Sport
- Country: Egypt
- Sport: Synchronised swimming

Dalia Muhammad Ahmad El-Gebaly (born 26 March 1992) is an Egyptian synchronized swimmer who competed in the 2008 and 2012 Summer Olympics.

== Personal life ==
El-Gebaly was born in Cairo, Egypt. As of 2012, El-Gebaly is 1.70 m (5 ft 7 in) tall and weighs 64 kg (141 lb).

== Synchronised Swimming ==
In 2008, El-Gebaly made her Olympic debut. El-Gebaly and partner Reem Abdalazem competed in Duet at the Olympic Games, coming 24th. She also participated in Team, coming 8th.

In 2009, El-Gebaly and Shaza El-Sayed competed in Thematic Duet at the FINA Synchro World Trophy. The duet placed 10th with a score of 85.000.

In 2012, El-Gebaly and El-Sayed competed in Duet at the Olympic Games, again coming 24th. El-Gebaly also competed in the team event, placing 7th.
