= Shimaa Afifi =

Egyptian taekwondo practitioner

Personal information
- Nationality: Egyptian
- Born: 4 April 1981 (age 44)
- Height: 1.63 m (5 ft 4 in)
- Weight: 54 kg (119 lb)

Sport
- Sport: Taekwondo

Shimaa Afifi (born 4 April 1981) is an Egyptian taekwondo practitioner. She competed in the 2000 Summer Olympics.She competed with her sister Heba Afifi. They were both born to Sobhey Youssef Afifi and to Adiat Ahmed. They also have an older brother named Youssef Afifi that competed in the 2000 Olympics
