= Nihal Meshref =

Egyptian table tennis player

Personal information
- Native name: نهال مشرف
- Nationality: Egypt
- Born: 24 December 1970 (age 55)
- Height: 1.62 m (5 ft 4 in)
- Weight: 59 kg (130 lb)

Sport
- Sport: Table tennis

Nihal Meshref (Arabic: نهال مشرف; born December 24, 1970, is an Egyptian table tennis player. She represented Egypt in 1988 and 1992 Summer Olympics, where she competed in women's singles event at table tennis competition.

== Olympic participation ==
=== Seoul 1988 ===
Group G

Rank	Athlete	W	L	GW	GL	PW	PL	NED	BUL	TCH	YUG	ARG	EGY
1	Bettine Vriesekoop (NED)	5	0	15	1	335	197	X	3–1	3–0	3–0	3–0	3–0
2	Daniela Guergueltcheva (BUL)	4	1	13	5	357	268	1–3	X	3–0	3–2	3–0	3–0
3	Alena Šafářová (TCH)	3	2	9	6	268	225	0–3	0–3	X	3–0	3–0	3–0
4	Gordana Perkučin (YUG)	2	3	8	9	282	296	0–3	2–3	0–3	X	3–0	3–0
5	Kim Hae-Ja (ARG)	1	4	3	13	214	319	0–3	0–3	0–3	0–3	X	3–1
6	Nihal Meshref (EGY)	0	5	1	15	182	333	0–3	0–3	0–3	0–3	1–3	X

Final Standing: 41T

=== Barcelona 1992 ===
Group L

Rank	Athlete	W	L	GW	GL	PW	PL	JPN	EUN	EGY	CUB
1	Mika Hoshino (JPN)	3	0	6	0	126	83	X	2–0	2–0	2–0
2	Valentina Popova (EUN)	2	1	4	2	112	91	0–2	X	2–0	2–0
3	Nihal Meshref (EGY)	1	2	2	4	97	116	0–2	0–2	X	2–0
4	Yolanda Rodríguez (CUB)	0	3	0	6	81	126	0–2	0–2	0–2	X

Final Standing: 33T
