= Alzahraa Shaban =

Egyptian sports shooter

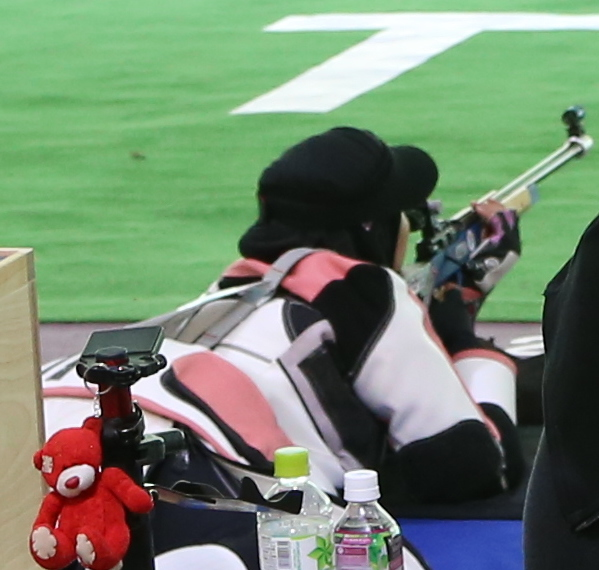
- Shaban in 2021

Personal information
- Nationality: Egyptian
- Born: 30 March 1991 (age 33)

Sport
- Sport: Sports shooting

Alzahraa Shaban (born 30 March 1991) is an Egyptian sports shooter. She competed in the women's 10 metre air rifle event at the 2020 Summer Olympics.
