= Mohamed Hussein =

Egyptian swimmer

Personal information
- Full name: Mohamed Khalid Mohamed Hussein
- Born: 10 September 1991 (age 34) Cairo, Egypt
- Height: 188 cm (6 ft 2 in)
- Weight: 78 kg (172 lb)

Sport
- Sport: Swimming
- Event: Backstroke
Medal record
Men's swimming
Representing Egypt
African Games
Bronze medal – third place	2011 Maputo	100 m backstroke
- Updated on 24 August 2016

Mohamed Khalid Mohamed Hussein (born 10 September 1991) is an Egyptian swimmer. At the 2016 Summer Olympics he competed in the Men's 200 m individual medley.
