= Dalia Allam =

Egyptian synchronized swimmer

Personal information
- Full name: داليا علام
- Nationality: Egypt
- Born: 17 September 1980 (age 45)

Sport
- Sport: Swimming
- Strokes: Synchronized swimming
- Updated on 31 July 2017

Dalia Allam (Arabic: داليا علام; born September 17, 1980) is a synchronized swimmer. She represented Egypt at women's duet event in synchronized swimming at the 2004 Summer Olympics in Athens.

== Olympic participation ==
=== Athena 2004 ===
Synchronized Swimming – Women's Duet
Country	Athletes	Qualifications			Final			Final Standing
Country	Athletes	Technical	Free	Total	Technical	Free	Total	Final Standing
Egypt	Dalia Allam	41.167	41.667	82.834	DNQ			21
Egypt	Heba Abdel Gawad	41.167	41.667	82.834	DNQ			21
