= Marwa Sultan =

Egyptian sports shooter

Marwa Sultan (born January 31, 1983, in Cairo) is an Egyptian sport shooter. She placed 49th in the women's 10 metre air rifle event at the 2000 Summer Olympics.
