= Mariam Omar (synchronized swimmer) =

Egyptian synchronized swimmer (born 1993)

Personal information
- Nationality: Egypt
- Born: 27 February 1993 (age 33)
- Height: 1.66 m (5 ft 5 in)
- Weight: 59 kg (130 lb)

Sport
- Sport: Swimming
- Strokes: Synchronized swimming

Mariam Omar (born 27 February 1993) is an Egyptian synchronized swimmer. She competed in the women's team event at the 2012 Olympic Games.
