= Sara Abdel Gawad =

Egyptian synchronized swimmer

Personal information
- Full name: سارة عبد الجواد
- Nationality: Egypt
- Born: 15 February 1982 (age 44) Riyadh, Saudi Arabia
- Height: 153 cm (5 ft 0 in)
- Weight: 46 kg (101 lb)

Sport
- Sport: Swimming
- Strokes: Synchronized swimming
- Updated on 2 August 2017

Sara Muhammad Tawfiq Abdel Gawad (Arabic: سارة عبد الجواد; born February 15, 1982) is a synchronized swimmer. She represented Egypt at women's duet event in synchronized swimming at 2000 Summer Olympics in Sydney. Her twin sister Heba Abdel Gawad is also a synchronized swimmer, they competed together in women's duet event in 2000 Summer Games.

== Olympic participation ==
=== Sydney 2000 ===
Synchronized Swimming – Women's Duet
Country	Athletes	Qualifications			Final			Final Standing
Country	Athletes	Technical	Free	Total	Technical	Free	Total	Final Standing
Egypt	Sara Abdel Gawad	84.933	85.067	85.021	DNQ			20
Egypt	Heba Abdel Gawad	84.933	85.067	85.021	DNQ			20
