= Dara Hassanien =

Egyptian synchronized swimmer

Personal information
- Born: 1 April 1996 (age 30)

Sport
- Country: Egypt
- Sport: Synchronized swimming

Dara Hassanien (born 1 April 1996) is an Egyptian synchronized swimmer. She competed in the women's duet at the 2016 Summer Olympics. Hassanien was a member of the Egyptian synchronized swimming team that beat Australia at the 2016 Summer Olympics, which was one of their goals.
