= Leila Abdelmoez =

Egyptian synchronized swimmer

Personal information
- Born: 30 September 1996 (age 29) Giza, Egypt

Sport
- Sport: Swimming
- Strokes: Synchronised swimming

Leila Muhammad Abdulfatah Muhammad Abdelmoez (born 30 September 1996) is an Egyptian synchronised swimmer. She competed in the team event at the 2016 Summer Olympics.
