= Heba Abdel Gawad =

Egyptian synchronized swimmer

Personal information
- Full name: هبة عبد الجواد
- Nationality: Egypt
- Born: 15 February 1982 (age 44) Riyadh, Saudi Arabia
- Height: 153 cm (5 ft 0 in)
- Weight: 46 kg (101 lb)

Sport
- Sport: Swimming
- Strokes: Synchronized swimming
- Updated on 1 August 2017

Heba Muhammad Tawfiq Abdel Gawad (Arabic: هبة عبد الجواد; born February 15, 1982) is a synchronized swimmer. She represented Egypt at women's duet event in synchronized swimming at two Summer Olympics tournaments; 2000 and 2004. Her twin sister Sara Abdel Gawad is also a synchronized swimmer, they competed together in women's duet event in 2000 Summer Games.

== Olympic participation ==
=== Sydney 2000 ===
Synchronized Swimming – Women's Duet
| Country | Athletes | Qualifications | | | Final | | | Final Standing |
| Country | Athletes | Technical | Free | Total | Technical | Free | Total | Final Standing |
|---|---|---|---|---|---|---|---|---|
| Egypt | Sara Abdel Gawad | 84.933 | 85.067 | 85.021 | DNQ | | | 20 |
| Egypt | Heba Abdel Gawad | 84.933 | 85.067 | 85.021 | DNQ | | | 20 |

=== Athena 2004 ===
Synchronized Swimming – Women's Duet
| Country | Athletes | Qualifications | | | Final | | | Final Standing |
| Country | Athletes | Technical | Free | Total | Technical | Free | Total | Final Standing |
|---|---|---|---|---|---|---|---|---|
| Egypt | Dalia Allam | 41.167 | 41.667 | 82.834 | DNQ | | | 21 |
| Egypt | Heba Abdel Gawad | 41.167 | 41.667 | 82.834 | DNQ | | | 21 |
