= Maha Gouda =

Egyptian diver

Personal information
- Native name: مها جودة
- National team: Egypt
- Born: June 8, 1998 (age 28) Alexandria, Egypt
- Height: 1.72 m (5 ft 8 in)

Sport
- Country: Egypt
- Sport: Diving
- University team: Florida International University
- Updated on 3 August 2017

Maha Muhammad Abdalsalam Gouda (Arabic: مها جودة; born June 8, 1998) is an Egyptian Olympic diver. She represented Egypt at 2016 Summer Olympics in Rio de Janeiro. She qualified to represent Egypt again at the 2020 Summer Olympics in the Women's 10 metre platform event.

== Olympic participation ==
=== Rio de Janeiro 2016 ===
Diving – Women's 10 metre platform

Maha Gouda (EGY)
Qualifying
| Dive No. | | DD | Judges' Score | | | | | | | Dive Points | Dive Rank | Total Points | Overall Rank |
| Dive No. | | DD | J1 | J2 | J3 | J4 | J5 | J6 | J7 | Dive Points | Dive Rank | Total Points | Overall Rank |
|---|---|---|---|---|---|---|---|---|---|---|---|---|---|
| #1 | 614B | 2.4 | ~~8.0~~ | 8.0 | ~~7.5~~ | 8.0 | 8.0 | ~~8.0~~ | ~~8.5~~ | 57.60 | 24 | 57.60 | 24 |
| #2 | 405B | 2.8 | ~~5.5~~ | ~~7.5~~ | 6.5 | 6.0 | 6.5 | ~~6.5~~ | ~~5.0~~ | 53.20 | 20 | 110.80 | 23 |
| #3 | 107C | 2.7 | 7.5 | 7.5 | ~~7.0~~ | ~~7.5~~ | ~~7.0~~ | ~~7.5~~ | 7.0 | 59.40 | 16 | 170.20 | 16 |
| #4 | 5152B | 2.9 | 8.0 | ~~7.5~~ | 8.0 | 7.5 | ~~8.0~~ | ~~7.0~~ | ~~8.0~~ | 68.15 | 7 | 238.35 | 14 |
| #5 | 305C | 2.8 | ~~4.5~~ | ~~4.0~~ | ~~5.0~~ | 4.5 | ~~5.0~~ | 4.5 | 4.5 | 37.80 | 27 | 276.15 | 24 |
Final
| Dive No. | | DD | Judges' Score | | | | | | | Dive Points | Dive Rank | Total Points | Overall Rank |
| Dive No. | | DD | J1 | J2 | J3 | J4 | J5 | J6 | J7 | Dive Points | Dive Rank | Total Points | Overall Rank |
DNQ
Final Standing
24th
