= Samia Ahmed =

Egyptian synchronized swimmer

Personal information
- Born: 20 January 1996 (age 30) Cairo, Egypt

Sport
- Country: Egypt
- Sport: Synchronized swimming

Samia Muhammad Hagrass Ahmed (born 20 January 1996) is an Egyptian synchronized swimmer. She competed in the women's duet at the 2016 Summer Olympics.
