= Nada Saafan =

Egyptian synchronized swimmer

Personal information
- Born: 10 September 1996 (age 29)

Sport
- Country: Egypt
- Sport: Synchronized swimming

Nada Saafan (born 10 September 1996) is an Egyptian synchronized swimmer. She competed in the women's team event at the 2016 Summer Olympics.
