= Samar Hassounah =

Egyptian synchronized swimmer

Personal information
- Full name: Samar Usama Ahmad Hassounah
- National team: Egypt
- Born: 19 December 1987 (age 38) Cairo, Egypt
- Height: 1.64 m (5 ft 5 in)

Sport
- Sport: Synchronized swimming
- Updated on 30 May 2015

Samar Hassounah (Arabic: سمر أسامة احمد حسونة) (born 19 December 1987, Cairo) is an Egyptian synchronized swimmer. She competed in the women's team event at the 2012 Olympic Games.
