= Nour Elayoubi =

Egyptian synchronized swimmer

Personal information
- Born: 16 January 1997 (age 29)

Sport
- Sport: Swimming
- Strokes: Synchronised swimming

Nour Elayoubi (born 16 January 1997) is an Egyptian synchronised swimmer. She competed in the team event at the 2016 Summer Olympics.
