= Salma Negmeldin =

Egyptian synchronized swimmer

Personal information
- Born: 5 March 1996 (age 30)

Sport
- Sport: Swimming
- Strokes: Synchronised swimming

Salma Negmeldin (born 5 March 1996) is an Egyptian synchronised swimmer. She competed in the team event at the 2016 Summer Olympics.
