= Nour El-Afandi =

Egyptian synchronized swimmer

Personal information
- Full name: Nour El-Afandi
- Nationality: Egypt
- Born: 10 January 1993 (age 33) Giza, Egypt
- Height: 1.67 m (5 ft 6 in)

Sport
- Sport: Swimming
- Strokes: Synchronized swimming
- Club: Shooting Club, Al-Jizah
- Updated on 25 May 2015

Nour Ahmad Muhammad El-Afandi (Arabic: نور احمد محمد الأفندي) (born 10 January 1993) is an Egyptian synchronized swimmer. She competed in the women's team event at the 2012 Olympic Games.
