= Jomana Elmaghrabi =

Egyptian synchronized swimmer

Personal information
- Born: 21 June 1995 (age 31)

Sport
- Sport: Swimming
- Strokes: Synchronised swimming

Jomana Elmaghrabi (born 21 June 1995) is an Egyptian synchronised swimmer. She competed in the team event at the 2016 Summer Olympics.
