= Youmna Khallaf =

Egyptian synchronized swimmer

Personal information
- Birth name: Youmna Amru Nagib Khallaf
- Nationality: Egyptian
- Born: 8 November 1991 (age 33); Giza, Egypt
- Height: 1.65 m (5 ft 5 in)
- Weight: 51 kg (112 lb)

Sport
- Country: Egypt
- Sport: Synchronized swimming
- Event: Team
- Club: Shooting Club

Youmna Amru Nagib Khallaf (born 8 November 1991 in Giza, Egypt) is an Egyptian competitor of synchronized swimming. A member of Egypt's National Team, she represented the nation at the 2008 and 2012 Summer Olympics.

== Personal life ==
Khallaf was born in Giza, Egypt. As of 2012, Khallaf is 1.65 m (5 ft 5 in) tall and weighs 51 kg (112 lb).

== Synchronised Swimming ==
An elite competitor for Egypt in the discipline of synchronised swimming, Khallaf, a dual Olympian, placed in eighth at the 2008 Summer Olympics of Beijing, and seventh at the subsequent London 2012 Summer Olympics, wherein both positions were achieved in the Women's Team events held at each Games.

Further international placings were achieved at the 2011 and 2013 FINA World Championships; at the former, held in Shanghai, Khallaf's team achieved standings of seventeenth in Technical and fifteenth in Free Team events, and at the latter of Barcelona, fourteenth place within both Free and Technical Team competitions.
