= Aya Darwish =

Egyptian synchronized swimmer

Personal information
- Full name: Aya Nasr Al-Din Ibrahim Ali Darwish
- National team: Egypt
- Born: 17 November 1994 (age 31) Cairo, Egypt
- Height: 1.59 m (5 ft 3 in)

Sport
- Sport: Swimming
- Strokes: Synchronized swimming
- Club: Shooting Club, Al-Jizah
- Updated on 25 May 2015

Aya Darwish (Arabic: أية نصر الدين إبراهيم علي درويش) (born 17 November 1994) is an Egyptian synchronized swimmer. She competed in the women's team event at the 2012 Olympic Games.
