= Reem Abdalazem =

Egyptian synchronized swimmer

Personal information
- Nationality: Egyptian
- Born: Reem Wail Abdalazem El-Bossaty; 25 November 1992 (age 33) Giza, Egypt
- Height: 1.63 m (5 ft 4 in)
- Weight: 59 kg (130 lb)

Sport
- Country: Egypt
- Sport: Synchronised swimming
- College team: Lindenwood University Synchronised Swimming Team
- Club: Gezira Club

Reem Wa'il Abdalazem El-Bossaty (born 25 November 1992) is an Egyptian synchronised swimmer who competed in the 2008 and 2012 Summer Olympics.

== Personal life ==
El-Bossaty was born on 25 November 1992 in Giza, Egypt. El-Bossaty's mother Doaa Abdalazem competed in the FINA World Aquatics Championships at the age of 21. El-Bossaty's hobbies include tennis and horse riding. El-Bossaty completed high school at El Alsson British and American. As of 2013, El-Bossaty is 1.63 m (5 ft 4 in) tall and weighs 59 kg (130 lb).

== Synchronised swimming ==
El-Bossaty is a synchronised swimmer. Her achievements include 1st in Figures and 4th in Duet at the 2007 Comen Cup in Geneve, Switzerland, 1st in Figures and Duet at the 2007 Russian International, 11th in Team at the 2007 FINA World Championships, 11th in Duet at the 2007 Zurich Swiss Open, 11th in Team and Duet at the 2007 FINA Synchro World Trophy, 15th in Team and Duet at the St Petersburg Junior World Championships 2007, 1st in Under 20 Solo and Duet at the 2008 Egypt Nationals, 1st in Under 18 Solo and 2nd in Duet at the 2008 Egypt Cup, qualifying for the Olympic Games in Team and Duet at the 2008 CANA Olympic Qualifications, 3rd in Team at the Japan Open, and 8th in Technical and Free Team and Technical and Free Duet at the 2008 Summer Olympics.

After the Games, she went on to do very well at other competitions, including 8th in Team and Duet at the 2008 Madrid Open, participation in the 2009 FINA World Championships, 8th in Solo at the 2009 FINA Synchro World Trophy, 1st in Free Solo, 2nd in Technical Solo, 2nd in Free Duet and 1st in Technical Duet at the 2009/2010 Egypt Nationals, qualification at the 2011 FINA World Championships for the 2012 Games in Duet and Team and 1st in Solo at the Egypt Cup.

El-Bossaty competed for Egypt in the synchronised swimming team event in the 2012 Summer Olympics. The Egyptian technical routine received a score of 77.600, and a score of 78.360 for the free routine, taking seventh place overall.
