= Artistic swimming at the 2020 Summer Olympics – Women's team =

Women's Team at the Games of the XXXII Olympiad
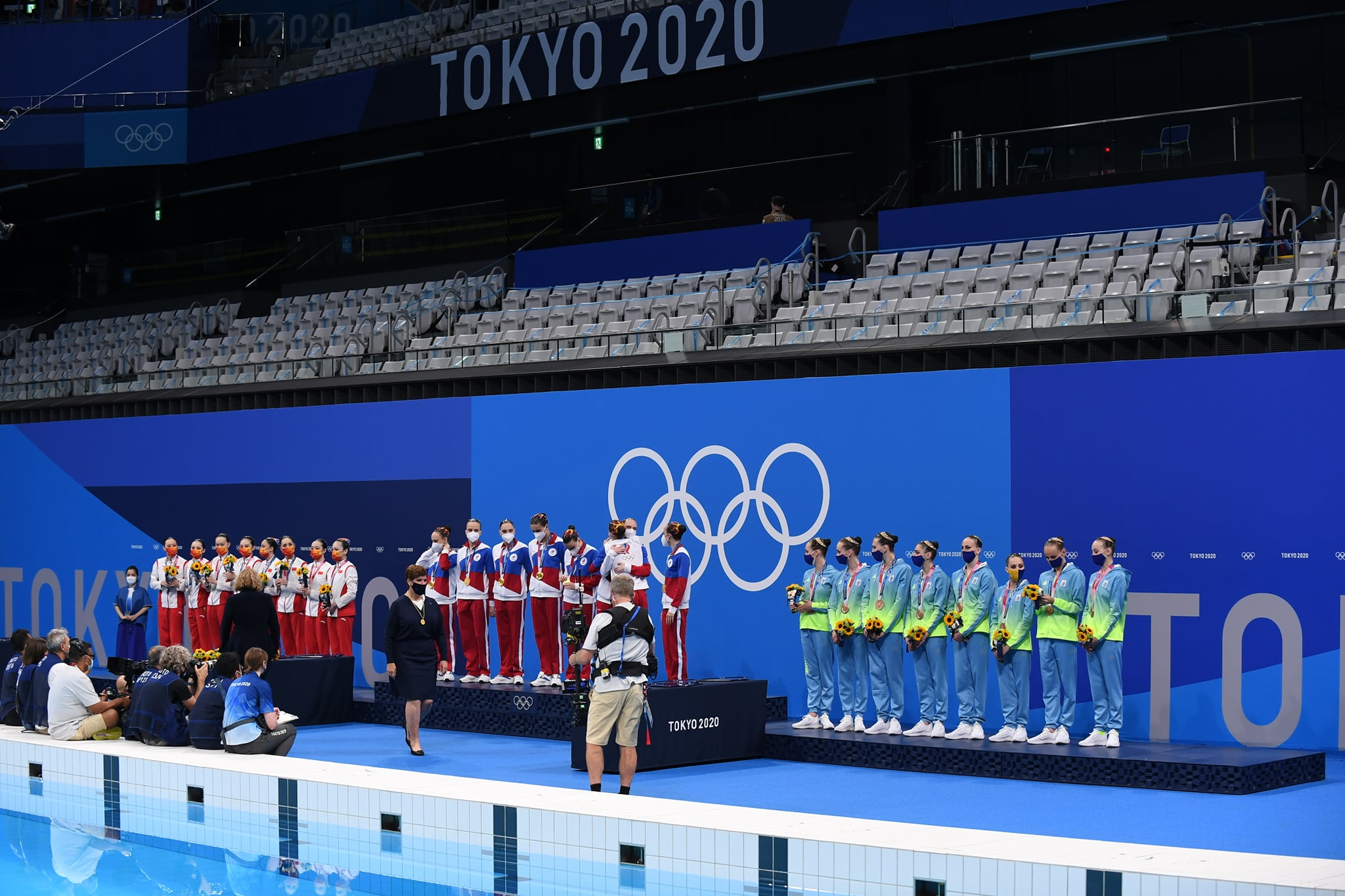
- Venue: Tokyo Aquatics Centre
- Dates: 6–7 August 2021
- Competitors: 72 from 9 nations
- Winning score: 196.0979

Medalists
1st place, gold medalist(s)		Vlada Chigireva; Marina Goliadkina; Svetlana Kolesnichenko; Polina Komar; Alexandra Patskevich; Svetlana Romashina; Alla Shishkina; Maria Shurochkina	ROC
2nd place, silver medalist(s)		Feng Yu; Guo Li; Huang Xuechen; Liang Xinping; Sun Wenyan; Wang Qianyi; Xiao Yanning; Yin Chengxin	China
3rd place, bronze medalist(s)		Maryna Aleksiiva; Vladyslava Aleksiiva; Marta Fiedina; Kateryna Reznik; Anastasiya Savchuk; Alina Shynkarenko; Kseniya Sydorenko; Yelyzaveta Yakhno	Ukraine

The women's team event at the 2020 Summer Olympics in Tokyo, Japan, took place at the Tokyo Aquatics Centre on 6 and 7 August 2021. It was the 7th time the women's team event was held at the Olympic Games.

Russian synchronized swimmers were the five-time defending champion and they successfully defended their title.

== Competition format ==
Only one round of competition is held. Each team will perform a technical routine and a free routine. The scores from the two routines are added together to decide the overall winners. Both free and technical routines starting lists are decided by random draw.

The technical routine must be completed in between 2 minutes 35 seconds and 3 minutes 5 seconds. There are 3 panels of 5 judges for each routine. In the technical routine, one panel each considers execution (30% of score), impression (30%), and elements (40%). The execution and impression judges each give a single score, while the elements judges give a score for each element. Scores are between 0 and 10, with 0.1 point increments. The highest and lowest score from each panel (including within each element, for the elements panel) are discarded. The remaining scores are averaged and weighted by the percentage for that panel, with element scores weighted within the element panel by degree of difficulty. The maximum possible score is 100. The routine must contain two highlight moves, one with the full team and one with the team split into subgroups. It must also contain a cadence, a circle, and a straight line. There are 5 required elements, which must be done in order:

1. Difficulty 2.5: Starting in Submerged Back Pike position. A thrust to Vertical, then maintaining height while a leg is bent to Bent Knee Vertical. A 360 degree spin as the leg is extended back to Vertical.
2. Difficulty 2.2: Starting in Vertical position. One full twist, then a 1440 degree continuous spin.
3. Difficulty 2.6: A Cyclone into Vertical position. Legs lowered into Split position. Walkover Front to finish.
4. Difficulty 3.1: A Flamingo into Surface Flamingo position. Keeping leg vertical, transition into Fishtail position. A 180 degree rotation while lifting other leg to Vertical position. Transitions to Bent Knee Surface Arch and then Surface Arch positions with continuous Arch to Back Layout Finish Action.
5. Difficulty 2.5: Starting in Submerged Back Pike position. Perform a Barracuda Airborne Split.

The free routine time limits are 3 minutes 45 seconds to 4 minutes 15 seconds. There is no restriction on the routine, except that there is a maximum of 6 acrobatic movements. The 3 panels for the free routine consider execution (30% of score), artistic impression (40%), and difficulty (30%). Each judge gives a single score. The highest and lowest score from each panel are discarded, with the remaining scores averaged and weighted. The maximum possible score is 100.

== Qualification ==
A total of 10 teams qualify for the event. The 2 National Olympic Committees (NOC) with the best result at the 2019 World Aquatics Championships qualify. Each continent also received one dedicated duet place; Africa and Oceania used the 2019 World Aquatics Championships to determine their selections, while the 2019 Pan American Games and the 2019 European Champions Cup served as qualifiers for the Americas and Europe. The Asia spot was guaranteed to the Olympic host, Japan. The final 3 places will be determined through a 2020 Olympic Qualification Tournament.

== Schedule ==
All times are Japan Standard Time (UTC+9)

The schedule for the women's team event covers two consecutive days of competition.

Date	Time	Round
Friday, 6 August 2021	19:30	Technical Routine
Saturday, 7 August 2021	19:30	Free Routine

== Results ==
Rank	Nation	Athletes	Technical	Free	Total
1st place, gold medalist(s)	ROC	Vlada Chigireva, Marina Goliadkina, Svetlana Kolesnichenko, Polina Komar, Alexandra Patskevich, Svetlana Romashina, Alla Shishkina, Maria Shurochkina	97.2979	98.8000	196.0979
2nd place, silver medalist(s)	China	Feng Yu, Guo Li, Huang Xuechen, Liang Xinping, Sun Wenyan, Wang Qianyi, Xiao Yanning, Yin Chengxin	96.2310	97.3000	193.5310
3rd place, bronze medalist(s)	Ukraine	Maryna Aleksiiva, Vladyslava Aleksiiva, Marta Fiedina, Kateryna Reznik, Anastasiya Savchuk, Alina Shynkarenko, Kseniya Sydorenko, Yelyzaveta Yakhno	94.2685	96.0333	190.3018
4	Japan	Juka Fukumura, Yukiko Inui, Moeka Kijima, Okina Kyogoku, Mayu Tsukamoto, Akane Yanagisawa, Mashiro Yasunaga, Megumu Yoshida	93.3773	94.9333	188.3106
5	Italy	Beatrice Callegari, Domiziana Cavanna, Linda Cerruti, Francesca Deidda, Costanza Di Camillo, Costanza Ferro, Gemma Galli, Enrica Piccoli	91.3372	92.8000	184.1372
6	Canada	Emily Armstrong, Rosalie Boissonneault, Andrée-Anne Côté, Camille Fiola-Dion, Claudia Holzner, Audrey Joly, Halle Pratt, Jacqueline Simoneau	91.4992	92.5333	184.0325
7	Spain	Ona Carbonell, Berta Ferreras, Meritxell Mas, Alisa Ozhogina, Paula Ramírez, Sara Saldaña, Iris Tió, Blanca Toledano	90.3780	91.5333	181.9113
8	Egypt	Laila Ali, Nora Azmy, Hanna Hiekal, Maryam Maghraby, Farida Radwan, Nehal Saafan, Shahd Samer, Jayda Sharaf	77.9147	80.0000	157.9147
9	Australia	Carolyn Rayna Buckle, Hannah Burkhill, Kiera Gazzard, Alessandra Ho, Kirsten Kinash, Rachel Presser, Emily Rogers, Amie Thompson	75.6351	77.3667	153.0018
	Greece	Maria Alzigkouzi Kominea, Eleni Fragkaki, Krystalenia Gialama, Pinelopi Karamesiou, Andriana Misikevych, Evangelia Papazoglou, Evangelia Platanioti, Georgia Vasilopoulou	DNS (Note: One of the team members had tested positive for COVID-19 during the duet, as the entire team was then withdrawn from the event)		
