= Egypt at the 2019 World Aquatics Championships =

- Flag of Egypt
- World Aquatics code: EGY
- National federation: Egyptian Swimming Federation
- Website: esf-eg.org

in Gwangju, South Korea
- Competitors: 26 in 4 sports
- Medals Ranked 23rd: Gold 0 Silver 0 Bronze 1 Total 1

World Aquatics Championships appearances
- 1973; 1975; 1978; 1982; 1986; 1991; 1994; 1998; 2001; 2003; 2005; 2007; 2009; 2011; 2013; 2015; 2017; 2019; 2022; 2023; 2024; 2025

Egypt competed at the 2019 World Aquatics Championships in Gwangju, South Korea from 12 to 28 July.

== Medalists ==
Medal	Name	Sport	Event	Date
Bronze	Farida Osman	Swimming	Women's 50 m butterfly	July 27

== Artistic swimming ==
Egypt's artistic swimming team consisted of 11 athletes (11 female).

Women

Athlete	Event	Preliminaries		Final	
Athlete	Event	Points	Rank	Points	Rank
Laila Mohsen; Dara Tamer	Duet technical routine	76.0662	28	Did not advance	
Hanna Hiekal; Jayda Sharaf; Nehal Saafan (R)	Duet free routine	76.2000	27	Did not advance	
Nora Azmy; Hanna Hiekal; Laila Mohsen; Farida Radwan; Nehal Saafan; Jayda Sharaf; Dara Tammer; Malak Toson; Shahd Samer (R); Farha Abdelwahab (R)	Team technical routine	76.8351	16	Did not advance	
Nora Azmy; Hanna Hiekal; Laila Mohsen; Farida Radwan; Nehal Saafan; Jayda Sharaf; Dara Tammer; Malak Toson; Shahd Samer (R); Malak Akef (R)	Team free routine	77.8333	17	Did not advance	

Legend: (R) = Reserve Athlete

== Diving ==
Egypt has entered five divers.

Men

Athlete	Event	Preliminaries		Semifinals		Final	
Athlete	Event	Points	Rank	Points	Rank	Points	Rank
Ammar Hassan	1 m springboard	253.65	39	—N/a		Did not advance	
Youssef Ezzat	3 m springboard	308.65	47	Did not advance			
Youssef Ezzat	10 m platform	328.65	29	Did not advance			
Mohab Ishak	3 m springboard	376.75	27	Did not advance			
Mohab Ishak	10 m platform	271.00	45	Did not advance			
Youssef Ezzat; Ammar Hassan	3 m synchronized springboard	294.63	22	—N/a		Did not advance	

Women

Athlete	Event	Preliminaries		Semifinals		Final	
Athlete	Event	Points	Rank	Points	Rank	Points	Rank
Maha Eissa	1 m springboard	206.70	28	—N/a		Did not advance	
Maha Eissa	3 m springboard	217.70	42	Did not advance			
Maha Abdelsalam	3 m springboard	133.75	50	Did not advance			
Maha Abdelsalam	10 m platform	260.85	24	Did not advance			

Mixed

Athlete	Event	Final	
Athlete	Event	Points	Rank
Mohab Ishak; Maha Eissa	3 m synchronized springboard	112.50	18

== Open water swimming ==
Egypt has entered two open water swimmers.

Men

Athlete	Event	Time	Rank
Marwan El-Amrawy	5 km	54:00.7	41
Marwan El-Amrawy	10 km	1:54:40.8	56

Women

Athlete	Event	Time	Rank
Sandy Atef	5 km	1:01:39.2	38
Sandy Atef	10 km	2:07:37.8	48

== Swimming ==
Egyptian swimmers have achieved qualifying standards in the following events (up to a maximum of 2 swimmers in each event at the A-standard entry time, and 1 at the B-standard)

Egypt has entered eight swimmers.

Men

Athlete	Event	Heat		Semifinal		Final	
Athlete	Event	Time	Rank	Time	Rank	Time	Rank
Ahmed Akram	1500 m freestyle	15:13.25	19	—N/a		Did not advance	
Marwan Elkamash	200 m freestyle	DNS		Did not advance			
Marwan Elkamash	400 m freestyle	3:52.51	23	—N/a		Did not advance	
Marwan Elkamash	800 m freestyle	8:07.97	26	—N/a		Did not advance	
Youssef Elkamash	50 m breaststroke	27.62	24	Did not advance			
Youssef Elkamash	100 m breaststroke	1:01.24	31	Did not advance			
Ahmed Hamdy	400 m individual medley	4:30.17	33	—N/a		Did not advance	
Ali Khalafalla	50 m freestyle	22.04	11 Q	21.98	13	Did not advance	
Ali Khalafalla	100 m freestyle	49.22	26	Did not advance			
Abdelrahman Sameh	50 m butterfly	23.54	15 Q	23.68	16	Did not advance	
Mohamed Samy	50 m backstroke	24.95	7 Q	25.16	16	Did not advance	
Mohamed Samy	100 m backstroke	55.87	39	Did not advance			
Mohamed Samy	200 m individual medley	2:02.57	32	Did not advance			
Mohamed Samy; Ali Khalafalla; Marwan Elkamash; Abdelrahman Sameh	4 × 100 m freestyle relay	DSQ		—N/a		Did not advance	
	4 × 200 m freestyle relay	DNS		—N/a		Did not advance	
Mohamed Samy; Youssef El-Kamash; Abdelrahman Sameh; Ali Khalafalla	4 × 100 m medley relay	3:39.03 NR	24	—N/a		Did not advance	

Women

Athlete	Event	Heat		Semifinal		Final	
Athlete	Event	Time	Rank	Time	Rank	Time	Rank
Farida Osman	50 m freestyle	DNS		Did not advance			
Farida Osman	100 m freestyle	54.93	28	Did not advance			
Farida Osman	50 m butterfly	25.71	3 Q	25.79	5 Q	25.47	3rd place, bronze medalist(s)
Farida Osman	100 m butterfly	58.43	17	Did not advance			
