= Canada at the 2019 World Aquatics Championships =

- Flag of Canada
- World Aquatics code: CAN
- National federation: Aquatic Federation of Canada
- Website: aquaticscanadaaquatiques.com

in Gwangju, South Korea
- Competitors: 67 in 6 sports
- Medals Ranked 10th: Gold 2 Silver 2 Bronze 7 Total 11

World Aquatics Championships appearances
- 1973; 1975; 1978; 1982; 1986; 1991; 1994; 1998; 2001; 2003; 2005; 2007; 2009; 2011; 2013; 2015; 2017; 2019; 2022; 2023; 2024; 2025

Canada competed at the 2019 World Aquatics Championships in Gwangju, South Korea from 12 to 28 July.

== Medallists ==
Medal	Name	Sport	Event	Date
Gold	Maggie MacNeil	Swimming	Women's 100 metre butterfly	22 July
Gold	Kylie Masse	Swimming	Women's 100 metre backstroke	23 July
Silver	Jennifer Abel; Mélissa Citrini-Beaulieu	Diving	Women's synchronized 3 m springboard	15 July
Silver	François Imbeau-Dulac; Jennifer Abel	Diving	Mixed synchronized 3 m springboard	20 July
Bronze	Eric Hedlin	Open water swimming	Men's 5 km	13 July
Bronze	Kayla Sanchez; Taylor Ruck; Penny Oleksiak; Maggie MacNeil; Rebecca Smith*	Swimming	Women's 4 x 100 metre freestyle relay	21 July
Bronze	Sydney Pickrem	Swimming	Women's 200 m individual medley	22 July
Bronze	Kayla Sanchez; Taylor Ruck; Emily Overholt; Penny Oleksiak; Rebecca Smith*; Emma O'Croinin*	Swimming	Women's 4 x 200 metre freestyle relay	25 July
Bronze	Sydney Pickrem	Swimming	Women's 200 m breaststroke	26 July
Bronze	Kylie Masse	Swimming	Women's 200 metre backstroke	27 July
Bronze	Kylie Masse; Sydney Pickrem; Maggie MacNeil; Penny Oleksiak; Kierra Smith*; Rebecca Smith*; Taylor Ruck*	Swimming	Women's 4 × 100 metre medley relay	28 July

== Artistic swimming ==
Canada's artistic swimming team consisted of 12 athletes (12 female).

Women

Athlete	Event	Preliminaries		Final	
Athlete	Event	Points	Rank	Points	Rank
Jacqueline Simoneau	Solo technical routine	89.1527	5 Q	89.2932	5
Jacqueline Simoneau	Solo free routine	90.4333	5 Q	90.7000	5
Claudia Holzner; Halle Pratt; Jacqueline Simoneau	Duet technical routine	87.7412	6 Q	88.8659	6
Claudia Holzner; Halle Pratt; Jacqueline Simoneau	Duet free routine	89.6000	7 Q	89.7667	7
Emily Armstrong; Andree-Anne Cote; Camille Fiola-Dion; Rebecca Harrower; Claudia Holzner; Audrey Joly; Halle Pratt; Jacqueline Simoneau; Catherine Barrett (R); Sion Ormond (R)	Team technical routine	88.4953	7 Q	89.4990	7
Emily Armstrong; Andree-Anne Cote; Camille Fiola-Dion; Rebecca Harrower; Claudia Holzner; Audrey Joly; Halle Pratt; Jacqueline Simoneau; Catherine Barrett (R); Kenzie Priddell (R)	Team free routine	90.2000	7 Q	90.1000	7
Emily Armstrong; Catherine Barrett; Andree-Anne Cote; Camille Fiola-Dion; Rebecca Harrower; Claudia Holzner; Audrey Joly; Sion Ormond; Halle Pratt; Jacqueline Simoneau; Kenzie Priddell (R); Cassandra Winkelaar (R)	Highlight routine	—N/a		89.9333	4

Legend: (R) = Reserve Athlete

== Diving ==
Canada has entered 10 divers.

Men

Athlete	Event	Preliminaries		Semifinals		Final	
Athlete	Event	Points	Rank	Points	Rank	Points	Rank
Philippe Gagné	3 m springboard	370.40	29	Did not advance			
Francois Imbeau-Dulac	3 m springboard	409.30	13 Q	395.20	16	Did not advance	
Bryden Hattie	10 m platform	379.30	20	Did not advance			
Vincent Riendeau	10 m platform	408.20	10 Q	421.00	11 Q	440.70	11
Philippe Gagné; François Imbeau-Dulac	Synchronized 3 m springboard	182.94	25	—N/a		Did not advance	
Vincent Riendeau; Nathan Zsombor-Murray	Synchronized 10 m platform	397.38	4 Q	—N/a		368.19	11

Women

Athlete	Event	Preliminaries		Semifinals		Final	
Athlete	Event	Points	Rank	Points	Rank	Points	Rank
Jennifer Abel	3 m springboard	318.75	4 Q	339.90	4 Q	333.35	4
Pamela Ware	3 m springboard	307.95	5 Q	308.00	6 Q	290.20	7
Meaghan Benfeito	10 m platform	344.60	2 Q	340.60	4 Q	347.80	6
Caeli McKay	10 m platform	315.85	8 Q	356.70	3 Q	331.40	7
Jennifer Abel; Mélissa Citrini-Beaulieu	Synchronized 3 m springboard	292.08	2 Q	—N/a		311.10	2nd place, silver medalist(s)
Meaghan Benfeito; Caeli McKay	Synchronized 10 m platform	298.11	2 Q	—N/a		304.05	4

Mixed

Athlete	Event	Final	
Athlete	Event	Points	Rank
François Imbeau-Dulac; Jennifer Abel	Synchronized 3 m springboard	304.08	2nd place, silver medalist(s)

== High diving ==
Canada qualified two female high divers.

Athlete	Event	Points	Rank
Aimee Harrison	Women's high diving	206.00	11

== Open water swimming ==
Canada qualified four male and two female open water swimmers.

Men

Athlete	Event	Time	Rank
Raben Dommann	Men's 5 km	53:40.5	16
Fan Hau-Li	Men's 10 km	1:48:21.1	17
Eric Hedlin	Men's 5 km	53:32.4	3rd place, bronze medalist(s)
Jon McKay	Men's 10 km	1:49:43.7	24

Women

Athlete	Event	Time	Rank
Chantel Jeffrey	Women's 5 km	58:18.1	28
Chantel Jeffrey	Women's 10 km	2:02:19.9	45
Kate Sanderson	Women's 5 km	58:17.7	24
Kate Sanderson	Women's 10 km	2:00:23.9	35

Mixed

Athlete	Event	Time	Rank
Fan Hau-Li; Chantel Jeffrey; Jon McKay; Kate Sanderson	Team	56:20.3	13

== Swimming ==
Canada has entered 25 swimmers.

Men

Athlete	Event	Heat		Semifinal		Final	
Athlete	Event	Time	Rank	Time	Rank	Time	Rank
Josiah Binnema	100 m butterfly	52.93	24	Did not advance			
Tristan Cote	400 m individual medley	4:17.22	15	—N/a		Did not advance	
Mackenzie Darragh	200 m butterfly	1:57.13	15 Q	1:57.89	7	Did not advance	
Richard Funk	50 m breaststroke	27.78	28	Did not advance			
Richard Funk	100 m breaststroke	1:00.73	27	Did not advance			
Yuri Kisil	50 m freestyle	22.38	25	Did not advance			
Yuri Kisil	100 m freestyle	48.79	17	Did not advance			
Gabe Mastromatteo	200 m breaststroke	2:15.61	39	Did not advance			
Alexander Pratt	200 m freestyle	1:49.56	35	Did not advance			
Cole Pratt	200 m backstroke	2:00.45	26	Did not advance			
Cole Pratt	200 m individual medley	2:04.26	36	Did not advance			
Markus Thormeyer	100 m freestyle	49.05	22	Did not advance			
Markus Thormeyer	100 m backstroke	53.77	10 Q	53.59	6	Did not advance	
Markus Thormeyer	200 m backstroke	1:58.16	17 Q	1:56.96	5 Q	1:58.50	8
Markus Thormeyer; Yuri Kisil; William Pisani; Carson Olafson	4 × 100 m freestyle relay	3:15.06	13	—N/a		Did not advance	
Markus Thormeyer; Alexander Pratt; Jeremy Bagshaw; Carson Olafson	4 × 200 m freestyle relay	7:14.01	17	—N/a		Did not advance	
Markus Thormeyer; Richard Funk; Joshua Liendo; Yuri Kisil	4 × 100 m medley relay	3:34.79	10	—N/a		Did not advance	

Women

Athlete	Event	Heat		Semifinal		Final	
Athlete	Event	Time	Rank	Time	Rank	Time	Rank
Maggie MacNeil	50 m butterfly	26.14	11 Q	26.28	14	Did not advance	
Maggie MacNeil	100 m butterfly	57.10	3 Q	56.52	2 Q	55.83	1st place, gold medalist(s)
Kylie Masse	100 m backstroke	58.91	1 Q	58.50	1 Q	58.60	1st place, gold medalist(s)
Kylie Masse	200 m backstroke	2:09.18	5 Q	2:06.57	2 Q	2:06.62	3rd place, bronze medalist(s)
Emma O'Croinin	400 m freestyle	4:09.68	12	—N/a		Did not advance	
Emma O'Croinin	1500 m freestyle	16:30.46	17	—N/a		Did not advance	
Penny Oleksiak	50 m butterfly	25.73	4 Q	25.93	6 Q	25.69	6
Penny Oleksiak	100 m freestyle	DNS		Did not advance			
Penny Oleksiak	200 m freestyle	1:57.25	6 Q	1:56.41	3 Q	1:56.59	6
Emily Overholt	400 m individual medley	4:37.90	4 Q	—N/a		4:37.42	5
Mackenzie Padington	400 m freestyle	4:16.06	24	—N/a		Did not advance	
Mackenzie Padington	800 m freestyle	8:39.58	18	—N/a		Did not advance	
Sydney Pickrem	200 m breaststroke	2:24.53	1 Q	2:23.11	3 Q	2:22.90	3rd place, bronze medalist(s)
Sydney Pickrem	200 m individual medley	2:10.34	4 Q	2:08.83	1 Q	2:08.70	3rd place, bronze medalist(s)
Sydney Pickrem	400 m individual medley	4:38.59	7 Q	—N/a		4:36.72	4
Taylor Ruck	100 m freestyle	53.69	10 Q	53.04	3 Q	53.03	5
Taylor Ruck	200 m freestyle	DNS		Did not advance			
Taylor Ruck	200 m backstroke	2:10.67	14 Q	2:08.42	4 Q	2:07.50	5
Kayla Sanchez	50 m freestyle	DNS		Did not advance			
Kierra Smith	100 m breaststroke	1:08.05	18	Did not advance			
Rebecca Smith	100 m butterfly	58.20	14 Q	57.59	6	Did not advance	
Kelsey Wog	200 m breaststroke	2:25.01	5 Q	2:24.17	7 Q	2:25.14	6
Kayla Sanchez; Taylor Ruck; Penny Oleksiak; Maggie MacNeil; Rebecca Smith*	4 × 100 m freestyle relay	3:34.73	2 Q	—N/a		3:31.78 NR	3rd place, bronze medalist(s)
Kayla Sanchez; Taylor Ruck; Emily Overholt; Penny Oleksiak; Rebecca Smith*; Emma O'Croinin*	4 × 200 m freestyle relay	7:55.10	6 Q	—N/a		7:44.35 NR	3rd place, bronze medalist(s)
Kylie Masse; Sydney Pickrem; Maggie MacNeil; Penny Oleksiak; Kierra Smith*; Rebecca Smith*; Taylor Ruck*	4 × 100 m medley relay	3:58.63	4 Q	—N/a		3:53.58	3rd place, bronze medalist(s)

Mixed

Athlete	Event	Heat		Final	
Athlete	Event	Time	Rank	Time	Rank
Markus Thormeyer; Yuri Kisil; Taylor Ruck; Penny Oleksiak; Kayla Sanchez*; Maggie MacNeil*	4 × 100 m mixed freestyle relay	3:24.09	3 Q	3:22.54	4
Kylie Masse; Richard Funk; Margaret MacNeil; Yuri Kisil	4 × 100 m mixed medley relay	3:44.03	5 Q	3:43.06	5

Legend: (*) = Swimmers who participated in the heat only.

== Water polo ==
=== Women's tournament ===
Team roster

- Jessica Gaudreault (C)
- Krystina Alogbo
- Axelle Crevier
- Emma Wright
- Monika Eggens
- Kelly Mckee
- Joëlle Békhazi
- Elyse Lemay-Lavoie
- Hayley McKelvey
- Kyra Christmas
- Kindred Paul
- Shae Fournier
- Claire Wright
- Coach: David Paradelo

Group B

Pos	Team	Pld	W	D	L	GF	GA	GD	Pts	Qualification
1	Russia	3	3	0	0	65	23	+42	6	Quarterfinals
2	Hungary	3	2	0	1	91	31	+60	4	Playoffs
3	Canada	3	1	0	2	46	35	+11	2	Playoffs
4	South Korea (H)	3	0	0	3	3	116	−113	0	

Source: Sportresult
Rules for classification: 1) points; 2) head-to-head points; 3) head-to-head goal difference; 4) head-to-head number of goals scored; 5) Goal difference.
(H) Hosts

14 July 2019; 11:10	Report	Canada	10–18	Russia	Nambu University Aquatics Center, Gwangju; Referees: Alessandro Severo (ITA), Nenad Periš (CRO)
14 July 2019; 11:10	Report	Score by quarters: 1–2, 2–5, 4–5, 3–6			Nambu University Aquatics Center, Gwangju; Referees: Alessandro Severo (ITA), Nenad Periš (CRO)
14 July 2019; 11:10	Report	Christmas 3	Goals	Prokofyeva 3	Nambu University Aquatics Center, Gwangju; Referees: Alessandro Severo (ITA), Nenad Periš (CRO)

16 July 2019; 09:50	Report	Canada	14–15	Hungary	Nambu University Aquatics Center, Gwangju; Referees: Nenad Peris (CRO), Georgios Stavridis (GRE)
16 July 2019; 09:50	Report	Score by quarters: 2–3, 4–5, 3–5, 5–2			Nambu University Aquatics Center, Gwangju; Referees: Nenad Peris (CRO), Georgios Stavridis (GRE)
16 July 2019; 09:50	Report	E. Wright, Fournier 3	Goals	Keszthelyi 7	Nambu University Aquatics Center, Gwangju; Referees: Nenad Peris (CRO), Georgios Stavridis (GRE)

18 July 2019; 19:10	Report	Canada	22–2	South Korea	Nambu University Aquatics Center, Gwangju; Referees: Michiel Zwart (NED), Michael Goldenberg (USA)
18 July 2019; 19:10	Report	Score by quarters: 5–0, 6–0, 6–0, 5–2			Nambu University Aquatics Center, Gwangju; Referees: Michiel Zwart (NED), Michael Goldenberg (USA)
18 July 2019; 19:10	Report	Christmas, E. Wright 3	Goals	Kyung, Lee J. 1	Nambu University Aquatics Center, Gwangju; Referees: Michiel Zwart (NED), Michael Goldenberg (USA)

Playoffs

20 July 2019; 14:00	Report	Netherlands	5–4	Canada	Nambu University Aquatics Center, Gwangju; Referees: Frank Ohme (GER), Stanko Ivanovski (MNE)
20 July 2019; 14:00	Report	Score by quarters: 0–0, 4–2, 0–1, 1–1			Nambu University Aquatics Center, Gwangju; Referees: Frank Ohme (GER), Stanko Ivanovski (MNE)
20 July 2019; 14:00	Report	Megens 2	Goals	E. Wright 2	Nambu University Aquatics Center, Gwangju; Referees: Frank Ohme (GER), Stanko Ivanovski (MNE)

9th–12th place semifinals

22 July 2019; 11:00	Report	Canada	17–16 (PSO)	China	Nambu University Aquatics Center, Gwangju; Referees: Frank Ohme (GER), Daniel Flahive (AUS)
22 July 2019; 11:00	Report	Score by quarters: 4–4, 3–4, 1–1, 2–1 PSO: 7–6			Nambu University Aquatics Center, Gwangju; Referees: Frank Ohme (GER), Daniel Flahive (AUS)
22 July 2019; 11:00	Report	Christmas 3	Goals	Zhang 4	Nambu University Aquatics Center, Gwangju; Referees: Frank Ohme (GER), Daniel Flahive (AUS)

Ninth place game

24 July 2019; 11:00	Report	Canada	24–7	Kazakhstan	Nambu University Aquatics Center, Gwangju; Referees: Sebastien Dervieux (FRA), Dion Willis (RSA)
24 July 2019; 11:00	Report	Score by quarters: 7–3, 5–1, 4–1, 8–2			Nambu University Aquatics Center, Gwangju; Referees: Sebastien Dervieux (FRA), Dion Willis (RSA)
24 July 2019; 11:00	Report	Békhazi 5	Goals	Roga, Mirshina 2	Nambu University Aquatics Center, Gwangju; Referees: Sebastien Dervieux (FRA), Dion Willis (RSA)
