= Egypt at the 2020 Summer Olympics =

- IOC code: EGY
- NOC: Egyptian Olympic Committee
- Website: www.egyptianolympic.org (in Arabic and English)

in Tokyo, Japan July 23, 2021 – August 8, 2021
- Competitors: 132 in 24 sports
- Flag bearers (opening): Hedaya Malak; Alaaeldin Abouelkassem
- Flag bearer (closing): Giana Farouk
- Medals Ranked 54th: Gold 1 Silver 1 Bronze 4 Total 6

Summer Olympics appearances (overview)
- 1912; 1920; 1924; 1928; 1932; 1936; 1948; 1952; 1956; 1960–1964; 1968; 1972; 1976; 1980; 1984; 1988; 1992; 1996; 2000; 2004; 2008; 2012; 2016; 2020; 2024

Other related appearances
- 1906 Intercalated Games –––– United Arab Republic (1960, 1964)

Egypt competed at the 2020 Summer Olympics in Tokyo. Originally scheduled to take place during the summer of 2020, the Games were postponed because of the COVID-19 pandemic and eventually took place from 23 July to 8 August 2021. Since the nation's Olympics debut in 1912, Egyptian athletes have appeared in every edition of the Summer Olympic Games except 1932 and 1980, joining the United States-led boycott in the latter.

== Medalists ==
| Medal | Name | Sport | Event | Date |
|---|---|---|---|---|
| Gold | Feryal Abdelaziz | Karate | Women's +61 kg | 7 August |
| Silver | Ahmed El-Gendy | Modern pentathlon | Men's individual | 7 August |
| Bronze | Hedaya Malak | Taekwondo | Women's 67 kg | 26 July |
| Bronze | Seif Eissa | Taekwondo | Men's 80 kg | 26 July |
| Bronze | Mohamed Ibrahim El-Sayed | Wrestling | Men's Greco-Roman 67 kg | 4 August |
| Bronze | Giana Farouk | Karate | Women's 61 kg | 6 August |

== Competitors ==
The following is the list of number of competitors in the Games. Note that reserves in football and handball are not counted:

| Sport | Men | Women | Total |
|---|---|---|---|
| Archery | 1 | 1 | 2 |
| Artistic swimming | 0 | 8 | 8 |
| Athletics | 4 | 0 | 4 |
| Badminton | 1 | 2 | 3 |
| Boxing | 2 | 0 | 2 |
| Canoeing | 1 | 1 | 2 |
| Cycling | 0 | 1 | 1 |
| Diving | 1 | 1 | 2 |
| Equestrian | 3 | 0 | 3 |
| Fencing | 7 | 4 | 11 |
| Football | 18 | 0 | 18 |
| Gymnastics | 2 | 9 | 11 |
| Handball | 14 | 0 | 14 |
| Judo | 3 | 0 | 3 |
| Karate | 2 | 3 | 5 |
| Modern pentathlon | 2 | 2 | 4 |
| Rowing | 1 | 0 | 1 |
| Sailing | 1 | 1 | 2 |
| Shooting | 7 | 4 | 11 |
| Swimming | 3 | 1 | 4 |
| Table tennis | 3 | 3 | 6 |
| Taekwondo | 2 | 2 | 4 |
| Tennis | 1 | 1 | 2 |
| Triathlon | 0 | 1 | 1 |
| Wrestling | 6 | 2 | 8 |
| Total | 85 | 47 | 132 |

== Archery ==
Two Egyptian archers qualified for the inaugural mixed team event, along with the men's and women's individual recurve, by winning the gold medal at the 2019 African Games in Rabat, Morocco.

| Athlete | Event | Ranking round | | Round of 64 | Round of 32 | Round of 16 | Quarterfinals | Semifinals | Final / BM | |
| Athlete | Event | Score | Seed | Opposition Score | Opposition Score | Opposition Score | Opposition Score | Opposition Score | Opposition Score | Rank |
|---|---|---|---|---|---|---|---|---|---|---|
| Youssof Tolba | Men's individual | 645 | 56 | Gankin (KAZ); L 4–6 | Did not advance | | | | | |
| Amal Adam | Women's individual | 570 | 63 | Jang M-h (KOR); L 0–6 | Did not advance | | | | | |
| Youssof Tolba; Amal Adam | Mixed team | 1215 | 29 | —N/a | | Did not advance | | | | |

== Artistic swimming ==
Egypt fielded a squad of eight artistic swimmers to compete in the women's duet and team event through an African continental selection in the team free routine at the 2019 FINA World Championships in Gwangju, South Korea.

| Athlete | Event | Technical routine | | Free routine (preliminary) | | | Free routine (final) | | |
| Athlete | Event | Points | Rank | Points | Total (technical + free) | Rank | Points | Total (technical + free) | Rank |
|---|---|---|---|---|---|---|---|---|---|
| Hanna Hiekal; Laila Mohsen | Duet | 77.8625 | 19 | 78.9000 | 156.7625 | 19 | Did not advance | | |
| Nora Azmy; Hanna Hiekal; Maryam Maghraby; Laila Mohsen; Farida Radwan; Nehal Saafan; Shahd Samer; Jayda Sharaf | Team | 77.9147 | 8 | —N/a | | | 80.0000 | 157.9147 | 8 |

== Athletics ==
Egyptian athletes further achieved the entry standards, either by qualifying time or by world ranking, in the following track and field events (up to a maximum of 3 athletes in each event):

Key

- Note–Ranks given for track events are within the athlete's heat only
- Q = Qualified for the next round
- q = Qualified for the next round as a fastest loser or, in field events, by position without achieving the qualifying target
- NR = National record
- N/A = Round not applicable for the event
- Bye = Athlete not required to compete in round

Field events

| Athlete | Event | Qualification | | Final | |
| Athlete | Event | Distance | Position | Distance | Position |
|---|---|---|---|---|---|
| Mostafa Amr Hassan | Men's shot put | 21.23 | 6 Q | 20.73 | 8 |
| Mohamed Magdi Hamza Khalif | Men's shot put | 19.82 | 25 | Did not advance | |
| Ihab Abdelrahman | Men's javelin throw | 81.92 | 13 | Did not advance | |
| Mostafa El Gamel | Men's hammer throw | 72.76 | 23 | Did not advance | |

== Badminton ==
Egypt entered three badminton players (one male and two female) for each of the following events into the Olympic tournament based on the BWF Race to Tokyo Rankings.

| Athlete | Event | Group stage | | | | Elimination | Quarterfinal | Semifinal | Final / BM | |
| Athlete | Event | Opposition Score | Opposition Score | Opposition Score | Rank | Opposition Score | Opposition Score | Opposition Score | Opposition Score | Rank |
|---|---|---|---|---|---|---|---|---|---|---|
| Doha Hany | Women's singles | Chen Yf (CHN); L (5–21, 3–21) | Yiğit (TUR); L (5–21, 5–21) | —N/a | 3 | Did not advance | | | | |
| Doha Hany; Hadia Hosny | Women's doubles | Matsumoto / Nagahara (JPN); L (7–21, 3–21) | Piek / Seinen (NED); L (6–21, 10–21) | Honderich / Tsai (CAN); L (5–21, 6–21) | 4 | —N/a | Did not advance | | | |
| Adham Hatem Elgamal; Doha Hany | Mixed doubles | Huang Yq / Zheng Sw (CHN); L (5–21, 10–21) | Chae Y-j / Choi S-g (KOR); L (7–21, 3–21) | Piek / Tabeling (NED); L (9–21, 4–21) | 4 | —N/a | Did not advance | | | |

== Boxing ==
Egypt entered two boxers into the Olympic tournament. Rio 2016 Olympian and 2015 African Games silver medalist Abdelrahman Oraby scored an outright semifinal victory to secure a spot in the men's light heavyweight division at the 2020 African Qualification Tournament in Diamniadio, Senegal. Reigning African Games champion Yousry Hafez completed the nation's boxing lineup by topping the list of eligible boxers from Africa in the men's super heavyweight division of the IOC's Boxing Task Force Rankings.

| Athlete | Event | Round of 32 | Round of 16 | Quarterfinals | Semifinals | Final | |
| Athlete | Event | Opposition Result | Opposition Result | Opposition Result | Opposition Result | Opposition Result | Rank |
|---|---|---|---|---|---|---|---|
| Abdelrahman Oraby | Men's light heavyweight | Bye | Whittaker (GBR); L 0–5 | Did not advance | | | |
| Yousry Hafez | Men's super heavyweight | Bye | Kunkabayev (KAZ); L 0–5 | Did not advance | | | |

== Canoeing ==
=== Sprint ===
Egyptian canoeists qualified two boats in each of the following distances for the Games by receiving spare berths freed up by South Africa at the 2019 African Games in Rabat, Morocco.

| Athlete | Event | Heats | | Quarterfinals | | Semifinals | | Final | |
| Athlete | Event | Time | Rank | Time | Rank | Time | Rank | Time | Rank |
|---|---|---|---|---|---|---|---|---|---|
| Momen Mahran | Men's K-1 200 m | 38.850 | 5 QF | 37.836 | 4 | Did not advance | | | |
| Samaa Ahmed | Women's K-1 500 m | 2:13.007 | 7 QF | 2:06.033 | 5 | Did not advance | | | |

Qualification Legend: FA = Qualify to final (medal); FB = Qualify to final B (non-medal)

== Cycling ==
=== Track ===
Following the completion of the 2020 UCI Track Cycling World Championships, Egypt entered one rider to compete in the women's omnium based on her final individual UCI Olympic rankings.

Omnium

| Athlete | Event | Scratch race | | Tempo race | | Elimination race | | Points race | | Total points | Rank |
| Athlete | Event | Rank | Points | Rank | Points | Rank | Points | Rank | Points | Total points | Rank |
|---|---|---|---|---|---|---|---|---|---|---|---|
| Ebtissam Zayed | Women's omnium | DNF | 16 | 18 | 6 | 17 | 8 | DNF | −20 | DNF | |

== Diving ==
Egypt sent three divers (two men and one woman) into the Olympic competition by winning the gold medal each in their respective individual events at the 2019 African Qualifying Meet in Durban, South Africa.

| Athlete | Event | Preliminary | | Semifinal | | Final | |
| Athlete | Event | Points | Rank | Points | Rank | Points | Rank |
|---|---|---|---|---|---|---|---|
| Mohab El-Kordy | Men's 3 m springboard | 422.75 | 12 Q | 408.85 | 11 Q | 393.15 | 11 |
| Mohab El-Kordy | Men's 10 m platform | 318.55 | 23 | Did not advance | | | |
| Maha Gouda | Women's 10 m platform | 275.30 | 20 | Did not advance | | | |

== Equestrian ==
Egypt fielded a squad of three equestrian riders into the Olympic team jumping competition for the first time since 1960, after securing an outright berth, as one of two top-ranked nations, at the International Equestrian Federation (FEI)-designated Olympic qualifier for Group F (Africa and Middle East) in Rabat, Morocco.

=== Jumping ===
| Athlete | Horse | Event | Qualification | | Final | | |
| Athlete | Horse | Event | Penalties | Rank | Penalties | Time | Rank |
|---|---|---|---|---|---|---|---|
| Nayel Nassar | Igor van de Wittemoere | Individual | 0 | =1 Q | 13 | 89.63 | 24 |
| Abdel Said | Bandit Savoie | Individual | 15 | 62 | Did not advance | | |
| Mouda Zeyada | Galanthos SHK | Individual | 1 | =26 Q | 8 | 86.63 | 19 |
| Nayel Nassar; Mohamed Talaat; Mouda Zeyada | Igor van de Wittermoere; Darshan; Galanthos SHK | Team | 29 | 11 | Did not advance | | |

== Fencing ==
Egyptian fencers qualified a full squad each in the men's and women's team foil and men's team sabre for the Games as the highest-ranked nation from Africa outside the world's top four in the FIE Olympic Team Rankings. Rio 2016 Olympian Nada Hafez (women's sabre) earned another place on the Egyptian team as the highest-ranked fencer vying for individual qualification from Africa in the FIE Adjusted Official Rankings, while Mohamed El-Sayed completed the nation's fencing roster for the Games by winning the final match of the men's épée at the African Zonal Qualifier in Cairo.

Men

| Athlete | Event | Round of 64 | Round of 32 | Round of 16 | Quarterfinal | Semifinal | Final / BM | |
| Athlete | Event | Opposition Score | Opposition Score | Opposition Score | Opposition Score | Opposition Score | Opposition Score | Rank |
|---|---|---|---|---|---|---|---|---|
| Mohamed El-Sayed | Épée | Bye | Borel (FRA); W 15–11 | Lan Mh (CHN); W 15–9 | Reizlin (UKR); L 13–15 | Did not advance | | |
| Alaaeldin Abouelkassem | Foil | Bye | Kleibrink (GER); W 15–11 | Mylnikov (ROC); W 15–12 | Shikine (JPN); L 13–15 | Did not advance | | |
| Mohamed Hamza | Foil | Bye | Mepstead (GBR); W 15–13 | Cassarà (ITA); W 15–13 | Choupenitch (CZE); L 9–15 | Did not advance | | |
| Mohamed Hassan | Foil | Bye | Garozzo (ITA); L 6–15 | Did not advance | | | | |
| Alaaeldin Abouelkassem; Mohamed Desouky; Mohamed Hassan; Youssef Sanaa* | Team foil | —N/a | | | France; L 34–45 | Classification semifinal Italy; L 34–45 | Seventh place final Hong Kong; L 21–45 | 8 |
| Mohamed Amer | Sabre | Bye | Homer (USA); W 15–11 | Oh S-u (KOR); L 9–15 | Did not advance | | | |
| Ziad El-Sissy | Sabre | Bye | Reshetnikov (ROC); W 15–13 | Bazadze (GEO); L 12–15 | Did not advance | | | |
| Mohab Samer | Sabre | Bye | Bazadze (GEO); L 10–15 | Did not advance | | | | |
| Mohamed Amer; Ziad El-Sissy; Mohab Samer; Medhat Moataz* | Team sabre | —N/a | | Japan; W 45–32 | South Korea; L 39–45 | Classification semifinal ROC; W 45–41 | Fifth place final Iran (IRI); W 45–41 | 5 |

Women

| Athlete | Event | Round of 64 | Round of 32 | Round of 16 | Quarterfinal | Semifinal | Final / BM | |
| Athlete | Event | Opposition Score | Opposition Score | Opposition Score | Opposition Score | Opposition Score | Opposition Score | Rank |
|---|---|---|---|---|---|---|---|---|
| Yara El-Sharkawy | Foil | Bye | Errigo (ITA); L 2–15 | Did not advance | | | | |
| Noha Hany | Foil | Bye | Chen Qy (CHN); L 6–15 | Did not advance | | | | |
| Noura Mohamed | Foil | Bye | Ueno (JPN); L 5–15 | Did not advance | | | | |
| Yara El-Sharkawy; Noha Hany; Noura Mohamed; Mariam El-Zoheiry* | Team foil | —N/a | | | ROC; L 21–45 | Classification semifinal Japan; L 27–45 | Seventh place final Hungary; L 28–45 | 8 |
| Nada Hafez | Sabre | Bye | Kim J-y (KOR); L 4–15 | Did not advance | | | | |

== Football ==
Summary

Key:

- A.E.T – After extra time.
- P – Match decided by penalty-shootout.

| Team | Event | Group stage | | | | Quarterfinal | Semifinal | Final / BM | |
| Team | Event | Opposition Score | Opposition Score | Opposition Score | Rank | Opposition Score | Opposition Score | Opposition Score | Rank |
|---|---|---|---|---|---|---|---|---|---|
| Egypt men's | Men's tournament | Spain; D 0–0 | Argentina; L 0–1 | Australia; W 2–0 | 2 Q | Brazil; L 0–1 | Did not advance | | |

=== Men's tournament ===
Egypt men's football team qualified for the Games by advancing to the final match of the 2019 Africa U-23 Cup of Nations, signifying the country's recurrence to the Olympic tournament after an eight-year absence.

Team roster

Egypt's 22-man final squad was announced on 2 July 2021.

Head coach: Shawky Gharieb

| No. | Pos. | Player | Date of birth (age) | Club |
|---|---|---|---|---|
| 1 | GK | Mohamed El Shenawy* | 18 December 1988 (aged 32) | (Egyptian Football Association) Al Ahly |
| 2 | MF | Amar Hamdy | 26 November 1999 (aged 21) | (Egyptian Football Association) Al Ittihad |
| 3 | DF | Karim Fouad | 1 October 1999 (aged 20) | (Egyptian Football Association) ENPPI |
| 4 | DF | Osama Galal | 17 September 1997 (aged 23) | (Egyptian Football Association) Pyramids |
| 5 | DF | Mohamed Abdel Salam | 1 October 1997 (aged 23) | (Egyptian Football Association) Zamalek |
| 6 | DF | Ahmed Hegazi* (captain) | 25 January 1991 (aged 30) | (Saudi Arabian Football Federation) Al-Ittihad |
| 7 | FW | Salah Mohsen | 1 September 1998 (aged 22) | (Egyptian Football Association) Al Ahly |
| 8 | MF | Nasser Maher | 8 February 1997 (aged 24) | (Egyptian Football Association) Al Ahly |
| 9 | FW | Taher Mohamed | 7 March 1997 (aged 24) | (Egyptian Football Association) Al Ahly |
| 10 | FW | Ramadan Sobhi | 23 January 1997 (aged 24) | (Egyptian Football Association) Pyramids |
| 11 | FW | Ibrahim Adel | 23 April 2001 (aged 20) | (Egyptian Football Association) Pyramids |
| 12 | MF | Akram Tawfik | 8 November 1997 (aged 23) | (Egyptian Football Association) Al Ahly |
| 13 | DF | Karim El Eraki | 29 November 1997 (aged 22) | (Egyptian Football Association) Al Masry |
| 14 | FW | Ahmed Yasser Rayyan | 24 January 1998 (aged 23) | (Egyptian Football Association) Ceramica Cleopatra |
| 15 | MF | Emam Ashour | 20 February 1998 (aged 23) | (Egyptian Football Association) Zamalek |
| 16 | GK | Mahmoud Gad | 1 October 1998 (aged 22) | (Egyptian Football Association) ENPPI |
| 17 | DF | Ahmed Ramadan | 23 March 1997 (aged 24) | (Egyptian Football Association) Al Ahly |
| 18 | DF | Mahmoud Hamdy* | 1 June 1995 (aged 26) | (Egyptian Football Association) Zamalek |
| 19 | FW | Abdel Rahman Magdy | 12 September 1997 (aged 23) | (Egyptian Football Association) Ismaily |
| 20 | DF | Ahmed Abou El Fotouh | 22 March 1998 (aged 22) | (Egyptian Football Association) Zamalek |
| 21 | FW | Nasser Mansi | 16 November 1997 (aged 23) | (Egyptian Football Association) Tala'ea El Gaish |
| 22 | GK | Mohamed Sobhy | 15 July 1999 (aged 22) | (Egyptian Football Association) Al Ittihad |

* Overage player.

Group play

| Pos | Team | Pld | W | D | L | GF | GA | GD | Pts | Qualification |
|---|---|---|---|---|---|---|---|---|---|---|
| 1 | Spain | 3 | 1 | 2 | 0 | 2 | 1 | +1 | 5 | Advance to knockout stage |
| 2 | Egypt | 3 | 1 | 1 | 1 | 2 | 1 | +1 | 4 | Advance to knockout stage |
| 3 | Argentina | 3 | 1 | 1 | 1 | 2 | 3 | −1 | 4 | |
| 4 | Australia | 3 | 1 | 0 | 2 | 2 | 3 | −1 | 3 | |

Source: TOCOG and FIFA
Rules for classification: Group stage tiebreakers
22 July 2021
16:30

| Egypt | 0–0 | Spain |
|---|---|---|
| | Report (TOCOG); Report (FIFA) |

Sapporo Dome, Sapporo
Referee: Adham Makhadmeh (Jordan)

25 July 2021
16:30

| Egypt | 0–1 | Argentina |
|---|---|---|
| | Report (TOCOG); Report (FIFA) | Medina 52' |

Sapporo Dome, Sapporo
Referee: Georgi Kabakov (Bulgaria)

28 July 2021
20:00

| Australia | 0–2 | Egypt |
|---|---|---|
| | Report (TOCOG); Report (FIFA) | Rayyan 44'; A. Hamdy 85' |

Miyagi Stadium, Rifu
Attendance: 4,471
Referee: Artur Soares Dias (Portugal)

Quarterfinal

31 July 2021
19:00

| Brazil | 1–0 | Egypt |
|---|---|---|
| Cunha 37' | Report (TOCOG); Report (FIFA) |

Saitama Stadium 2002, Saitama
Referee: Chris Beath (Australia)

== Gymnastics ==
=== Artistic ===
Egypt entered three artistic gymnasts into the Olympic competition. Mandy Mohamed booked a spot in the women's individual all-around and apparatus events, by finishing seventeenth out of the twenty gymnasts eligible for qualification at the 2019 World Championships in Stuttgart, Germany. Meanwhile, Omer Mohamed and Zeina Ibrahim claimed additional places to join Mohamed on the Egyptian squad with a top-two finish in their respective individual events at the 2021 African Championships in Cairo.

Men

| Athlete | Event | Qualification | | | | | | | | Final | | | | | | | |
| Athlete | Event | Apparatus | | | | | | Total | Rank | Apparatus | | | | | | Total | Rank |
| Athlete | Event | F | PH | R | V | PB | HB | Total | Rank | F | PH | R | V | PB | HB | Total | Rank |
|---|---|---|---|---|---|---|---|---|---|---|---|---|---|---|---|---|---|
| Omar Mohamed | All-around | 13.233 | 13.000 | 12.500 | 13.800 | 13.300 | 13.033 | 78.866 | 51 | Did not advance | | | | | | | |

Women

| Athlete | Event | Qualification | | | | | | Final | | | | | |
| Athlete | Event | Apparatus | | | | Total | Rank | Apparatus | | | | Total | Rank |
| Athlete | Event | V | UB | BB | F | Total | Rank | V | UB | BB | F | Total | Rank |
|---|---|---|---|---|---|---|---|---|---|---|---|---|---|
| Zeina Ibrahim | All-around | 13.200 | 12.500 | 11.866 | 11.700 | 49.266 | 64 | Did not advance | | | | | |
| Mandy Mohamed | All-around | 13.233 | 11.033 | 11.200 | 12.833 | 48.866 | 67 | Did not advance | | | | | |

=== Rhythmic ===
Egypt fielded a squad of rhythmic gymnasts to compete for the first time at the Olympics, by winning the gold each in the individual and group all-around at the 2020 African Championships in Sharm El Sheikh.

| Athlete | Event | Qualification | | | | | | Final | | | | | |
| Athlete | Event | Hoop | Ball | Clubs | Ribbon | Total | Rank | Hoop | Ball | Clubs | Ribbon | Total | Rank |
|---|---|---|---|---|---|---|---|---|---|---|---|---|---|
| Habiba Marzouk | Individual | 21.700 | 22.150 | 21.100 | 8.400 | 73.350 | 25 | Did not advance | | | | | |

| Athletes | Event | Qualification | | | | Final | | | |
| Athletes | Event | 5 apps | 3+2 apps | Total | Rank | 5 apps. | 3+2 apps | Total | Rank |
|---|---|---|---|---|---|---|---|---|---|
| Login Elsasyed; Polina Fouda; Salma Saleh; Malak Selim; Tia Sobhy | Group | 36.300 | 33.050 | 69.350 | 13 | Did not advance | | | |

=== Trampoline ===
Egypt qualified one gymnast each for the men's and women's trampoline by claiming the top spots, respectively, at the 2021 African Championships in Cairo.

| Athlete | Event | Qualification | | Final | |
| Athlete | Event | Score | Rank | Score | Rank |
|---|---|---|---|---|---|
| Seif Asser Sherif | Men's | 96.190 | 10 | Did not advance | |
| Malak Hamza | Women's | 94.720 | 9 | Did not advance | |

== Handball ==
Summary

Key:

- ET: After extra time
- P – Match decided by penalty-shootout.

| Team | Event | Group stage | | | | | | Quarterfinal | Semifinal | Final / BM | |
| Team | Event | Opposition Score | Opposition Score | Opposition Score | Opposition Score | Opposition Score | Rank | Opposition Score | Opposition Score | Opposition Score | Rank |
|---|---|---|---|---|---|---|---|---|---|---|---|
| Egypt men's | Men's tournament | Portugal; W 37–31 | Denmark; L 32–27 | Japan; W 33–29 | Sweden; W 27–22 | Bahrain; W 30–20 | 2 Q | Germany; W 31–26 | France; L 23–27 | Spain; L 31–33 | 4 |

=== Men's tournament ===
Egypt men's handball team qualified for the Olympics by winning the gold medal and securing an outright berth at the final match of the 2020 African Men's Handball Championship in Tunis, Tunisia.

Team roster

The squad was announced on 12 July 2021.

Head coach: (Spain) Roberto García Parrondo

| No. | Pos. | Name | Date of birth (age) | Height | App. | Goals | Club |
|---|---|---|---|---|---|---|---|
| 5 | RB | Yahia Omar | 9 September 1997 (aged 23) | 1.94 m | 52 | 171 | (Hungary) Telekom Veszprém |
| 15 | LB | Ahmed Hesham | 15 May 2000 (aged 21) | 1.91 m | 9 | 15 | (France) USAM Nîmes Gard |
| 24 | P | Ibrahim El-Masry | 11 March 1989 (aged 32) | 1.92 m | 249 | 74 | (Egypt) Al Ahly |
| 25 | P | Wisam Nawar | 14 February 1990 (aged 31) | 1.84 m | 109 | 42 | (Egypt) Zamalek |
| 31 | LW | Omar El-Wakil | 14 May 1988 (aged 33) | 1.74 m | 205 | 264 | (Egypt) Zamalek |
| 39 | LB | Yehia El-Deraa | 17 July 1995 (aged 26) | 1.92 m | 143 | 264 | (Egypt) Zamalek |
| 42 | LB | Hassan Kaddah | 1 May 2000 (aged 21) | 2.05 m | 39 | 38 | (Egypt) Zamalek |
| 45 | CB | Seif El-Deraa | 19 September 1998 (aged 22) | 1.87 m | 39 | 66 | (Egypt) Zamalek |
| 66 | RB | Ahmed El-Ahmar | 27 January 1984 (aged 37) | 1.86 m | 322 | 1425 | (Egypt) Zamalek |
| 80 | P | Ahmed Mesilhy | 25 November 1994 (aged 26) | 1.84 m | 12 | 6 | (Egypt) Al Ahly |
| 88 | GK | Karim Handawy | 1 May 1988 (aged 33) | 1.88 m | 163 | 0 | (North Macedonia) RK Eurofarm Pelister |
| 89 | P | Mohamed Mamdouh Shebib | 1 April 1989 (aged 32) | 1.94 m | 244 | 288 | (Romania) Dinamo București |
| 90 | LB | Ali Zein | 14 December 1990 (aged 30) | 1.93 m | 299 | 409 | (United Arab Emirates) Sharjah |
| 91 | RW | Mohammad Sanad | 16 January 1991 (aged 30) | 1.88 m | 152 | 373 | (France) USAM Nîmes Gard |
| 96 | GK | Mohamed El-Tayar | 7 April 1996 (aged 25) | 1.91 m | 49 | 0 | (Egypt) Al Ahly |

Group play

| Pos | Team | Pld | W | D | L | GF | GA | GD | Pts | Qualification |
|---|---|---|---|---|---|---|---|---|---|---|
| 1 | Denmark | 5 | 4 | 0 | 1 | 174 | 139 | +35 | 8 (Note: Denmark 2 Pts, +2 GD; Egypt 2 Pts, 0 GD, Sweden 2 Pts, −2 GD) | Quarter-finals |
| 2 | Egypt | 5 | 4 | 0 | 1 | 154 | 134 | +20 | 8 | Quarter-finals |
| 3 | Sweden | 5 | 4 | 0 | 1 | 144 | 142 | +2 | 8 | Quarter-finals |
| 4 | Bahrain | 5 | 1 | 0 | 4 | 129 | 149 | −20 | 2 (Note: Bahrain 2 Pts, +1 GD; Portugal 2 Pts, 0 GD, Japan 2 Pts, −1 GD) | Quarter-finals |
| 5 | Portugal | 5 | 1 | 0 | 4 | 143 | 156 | −13 | 2 | |
| 6 | Japan (H) | 5 | 1 | 0 | 4 | 146 | 170 | −24 | 2 | |

Source: Tokyo 2020 and IHF
Rules for classification: 1) Points; 2) Head-to-head points; 3) Head-to-head goal difference; 4) Head-to-head goals scored; 5) Goal difference; 6) Goals scored; 7) Draw.
(H) Hosts
Notes:

| 24 July 2021; 19:30 | Portugal | 31–37 | Egypt | Yoyogi National Gymnasium, Tokyo; Referees: Nikolov, Nachevski (MKD) |
| 24 July 2021; 19:30 | Ferraz 6 | (15–15) | Hesham 7 | Yoyogi National Gymnasium, Tokyo; Referees: Nikolov, Nachevski (MKD) |
| 24 July 2021; 19:30 | 2× (yellow card) 5× (suspension) | Report | 1× (yellow card) 2× (suspension) | Yoyogi National Gymnasium, Tokyo; Referees: Nikolov, Nachevski (MKD) |

| 26 July 2021; 14:15 | Egypt | 27–32 | Denmark | Yoyogi National Gymnasium, Tokyo; Referees: Raluy, Sabroso (ESP) |
| 26 July 2021; 14:15 | Hesham 6 | (15–14) | M. Hansen 9 | Yoyogi National Gymnasium, Tokyo; Referees: Raluy, Sabroso (ESP) |
| 26 July 2021; 14:15 | 5× (suspension) | Report | 2× (yellow card) 5× (suspension) | Yoyogi National Gymnasium, Tokyo; Referees: Raluy, Sabroso (ESP) |

| 28 July 2021; 14:15 | Japan | 29–33 | Egypt | Yoyogi National Gymnasium, Tokyo; Referees: Schulze, Tönnies (GER) |
| 28 July 2021; 14:15 | Tokuda 8 | (11–18) | El-Ahmar 8 | Yoyogi National Gymnasium, Tokyo; Referees: Schulze, Tönnies (GER) |
| 28 July 2021; 14:15 | 1× (yellow card) 7× (suspension) | Report | 2× (suspension) | Yoyogi National Gymnasium, Tokyo; Referees: Schulze, Tönnies (GER) |

| 30 July 2021; 16:15 | Sweden | 22–27 | Egypt | Yoyogi National Gymnasium, Tokyo; Referees: Bonaventura, Bonaventura (FRA) |
| 30 July 2021; 16:15 | Pellas 7 | (9–13) | Sanad 6 | Yoyogi National Gymnasium, Tokyo; Referees: Bonaventura, Bonaventura (FRA) |
| 30 July 2021; 16:15 | 2× (yellow card) 2× (suspension) | Report | 2× (suspension) | Yoyogi National Gymnasium, Tokyo; Referees: Bonaventura, Bonaventura (FRA) |

| 1 August 2021; 11:00 | Egypt | 30–20 | Bahrain | Yoyogi National Gymnasium, Tokyo; Referees: Raluy, Sabroso (ESP) |
| 1 August 2021; 11:00 | El-Ahmar 5 | (15–7) | Habib 4 | Yoyogi National Gymnasium, Tokyo; Referees: Raluy, Sabroso (ESP) |
| 1 August 2021; 11:00 | 2× (yellow card) 2× (suspension) | Report | 1× (yellow card) 1× (suspension) | Yoyogi National Gymnasium, Tokyo; Referees: Raluy, Sabroso (ESP) |

Quarterfinal

| 3 August 2021; 20:45 | Germany | 26–31 | Egypt | Yoyogi National Gymnasium, Tokyo; Referees: Nikolov, Nachevski (MKD) |
| 3 August 2021; 20:45 | Golla, Kühn 6 | (12–16) | Omar, Zein 5 | Yoyogi National Gymnasium, Tokyo; Referees: Nikolov, Nachevski (MKD) |
| 3 August 2021; 20:45 | 1× (yellow card) 3× (suspension) | Report | 1× (yellow card) 1× (suspension) | Yoyogi National Gymnasium, Tokyo; Referees: Nikolov, Nachevski (MKD) |

Semifinal

| 5 August 2021; 17:00 | France | 27–23 | Egypt | Yoyogi National Gymnasium, Tokyo; Referees: Raluy, Sabroso (ESP) |
| 5 August 2021; 17:00 | Descat, Mem 5 | (13–13) | El-Ahmar, Omar 5 | Yoyogi National Gymnasium, Tokyo; Referees: Raluy, Sabroso (ESP) |
| 5 August 2021; 17:00 | 3× (yellow card) 3× (suspension) | Report | 1× (yellow card) 1× (suspension) | Yoyogi National Gymnasium, Tokyo; Referees: Raluy, Sabroso (ESP) |

Bronze medal game

| 7 August 2021; 17:00 | Egypt | 31–33 | Spain | Yoyogi National Gymnasium, Tokyo; Referees: Schulze, Tönnies (GER) |
| 7 August 2021; 17:00 | El-Ahmar, Shebib 7 | (16–19) | Gómez 8 | Yoyogi National Gymnasium, Tokyo; Referees: Schulze, Tönnies (GER) |
| 7 August 2021; 17:00 | 2× (suspension) | Report | 2× (yellow card) 4× (suspension) 1× (red card) | Yoyogi National Gymnasium, Tokyo; Referees: Schulze, Tönnies (GER) |

== Judo ==
Egypt qualified three male judoka for each of the following weight classes at the Games. Mohamed Abdelmawgoud (men's half-lightweight, 66 kg), with Ramadan Darwish (men's half-heavyweight, 100 kg) earning his third consecutive trip to the Games, was selected among the top 18 judoka of their respective weight classes based on the IJF World Ranking List of June 28, 2021, while Rio 2016 Olympian Mohamed Abdelaal (men's half-middleweight, 81 kg) accepted a continental berth from Africa as the nation's top-ranked judoka outside of direct qualifying position.

| Athlete | Event | Round of 64 | Round of 32 | Round of 16 | Quarterfinals | Semifinals | Repechage | Final / BM | |
| Athlete | Event | Opposition Result | Opposition Result | Opposition Result | Opposition Result | Opposition Result | Opposition Result | Opposition Result | Rank |
|---|---|---|---|---|---|---|---|---|---|
| Mohamed Abdelmawgoud | Men's −66 kg | —N/a | Cargnin (BRA); L 00–10 | Did not advance | | | | | |
| Mohamed Abdelaal | Men's −81 kg | Bye | Ungvári (HUN); W 10–00 | Parlati (ITA); L 00–01 | Did not advance | | | | |
| Ramadan Darwish | Men's −100 kg | —N/a | Shah (PAK); W 01–00 | Liparteliani (GEO); L 00–01 | Did not advance | | | | |

== Karate ==
Egypt entered five karateka into the inaugural Olympic tournament. Ali El-Sawy and 2016 world champion Giana Farouk qualified directly for the men's kumite 67 kg and women's kumite 61-kg category, respectively by finishing among the top four karateka at the end of the combined WKF Olympic Rankings. Feryal Abdelaziz finished among the top three in the final pool round of the women's kumite +61 kg category to secure an additional place on the Egyptian squad at the 2021 World Qualification Tournament in Paris, France. Abdalla Abdelaziz (men's kumite 75 kg) and Radwa Sayed (women's kumite 55 kg) completed the lineup by topping the continental field of karateka vying for qualification from the African zone based on the WKD Olympic Rankings.

Kumite

| Athlete | Event | Round Robin | | | | | Semifinals | Final | |
| Athlete | Event | Opposition Result | Opposition Result | Opposition Result | Opposition Result | Rank | Opposition Result | Opposition Result | Rank |
|---|---|---|---|---|---|---|---|---|---|
| Ali El-Sawy | Men's −67 kg | Sago (JPN); L 3–4 | Şamdan (TUR); L 1–4 | Farzaliyev (AZE); W 1–0 | Assadilov (KAZ); L 1–3 | 3 | Did not advance | | |
| Abdalla Abdelaziz | Men's −75 kg | Hárspataki (HUN); L 2–2^{+} | Nishimura (JPN); L 7–8 | Scott (USA); L 1–3 | Horuna (UKR); W 4–1 | 5 | Did not advance | | |
| Radwa Sayed | Women's −55 kg | Zhangbyrbay (KAZ); L 2–7 | Terliuga (UKR); L 0–1 | Miyahara (JPN); W 5–3 | Plank (AUT); L 6–7 | 5 | Did not advance | | |
| Giana Farouk | Women's −61 kg | Grande (PER); W 2–0 | Serogina (UKR); W 2–1 | Sadini (MAR); W 5–0 | Preković (SRB); L 1–1^{+} | 2 Q | Yin Xy (CHN); L 1–1^{+} | Did not advance | 3rd place, bronze medalist(s) |
| Feryal Abdelaziz | Women's +61 kg | Gong L (CHN); W 4–0 | Quirici (SUI); W 3^{+}–3 | Abbasali (IRI); L 7–9 | Matoub (ALG); D 0–0 | q | Berultseva (KAZ); W 5–4 | Zaretska (AZE); W 2–0 | 1st place, gold medalist(s) |

== Modern pentathlon ==
Egyptian athletes qualified for the following spots to compete in modern pentathlon. Rio 2016 Olympian Haydy Morsy secured a spot in the women's event by virtue of her top finish at the 2019 African Championships in Cairo. On the men's side, Ahmed El-Gendy locked the podium with a bronze medal to join Morsy on the Egyptian roster at the 2021 UIPM World Championships in Cairo, with Ahmed Hamed and Amira Kandil receiving the spare berths previously declined by the original entrants, as the next highest-ranked, eligible modern pentathletes in the UIPM World Rankings.

| Athlete | Event | Fencing (épée one touch) | | | | Swimming (200 m freestyle) | | | Riding (show jumping) | | | Combined: shooting/running (10 m air pistol)/(3200 m) | | | Total points | Final rank |
| Athlete | Event | RR | BR | Rank | MP points | Time | Rank | MP points | Penalties | Rank | MP points | Time | Rank | MP points | Total points | Final rank |
|---|---|---|---|---|---|---|---|---|---|---|---|---|---|---|---|---|
| Ahmed Hamed | Men's | 16–19 | 0 | 21 | 196 | 2:06.58 | 28 | 297 | 21 | 19 | 279 | 11:25.85 | 20 | 615 | 1387 | 24 |
| Ahmed El-Gendy | Men's | 18–17 | 1 | 15 | 209 | 1:57.13 | 5 | 316 | 16 | 18 | 284 | 10:32.47 | 2 | 668 | 1477 | 2nd place, silver medalist(s) |
| Amira Kandil | Women's | 18–17 | 1 | 21 | 199 | 2:15.14 | 16 | 280 | 50 | 25 | 250 | 13:28.34 | 32 | 492 | 1221 | 29 |
| Haydy Morsy | Women's | 20–15 | 1 | 10 | 221 | 2:24.35 | 33 | 262 | 7 | 6 | 293 | 13:07.69 | 25 | 513 | 1289 | 19 |

== Rowing ==
Egypt qualified one boat in the men's single sculls for the Games by winning the gold medal and securing the first of five berths available at the 2019 FISA African Olympic Qualification Regatta in Tunis, Tunisia.

| Athlete | Event | Heats | | Repechage | | Quarterfinals | | Semifinals | | Final | |
| Athlete | Event | Time | Rank | Time | Rank | Time | Rank | Time | Rank | Time | Rank |
|---|---|---|---|---|---|---|---|---|---|---|---|
| Abdelkhalek Elbana | Men's single sculls | 7:03.44 | 3 QF | Bye | | 7:32.86 | 5 SC/D | 6:58.84 | 2 FC | 7:00.72 | 14 |

Qualification Legend: FA=Final A (medal); FB=Final B (non-medal); FC=Final C (non-medal); FD=Final D (non-medal); FE=Final E (non-medal); FF=Final F (non-medal); SA/B=Semifinals A/B; SC/D=Semifinals C/D; SE/F=Semifinals E/F; QF=Quarterfinals; R=Repechage

== Sailing ==
Egyptian sailors qualified one boat in each of the following classes through the class-associated World Championships and the continental regattas.

| Athlete | Event | Race | | | | | | | | | | | Net points | Final rank |
| Athlete | Event | 1 | 2 | 3 | 4 | 5 | 6 | 7 | 8 | 9 | 10 | M* | Net points | Final rank |
|---|---|---|---|---|---|---|---|---|---|---|---|---|---|---|
| Aly Badawy | Men's Laser | 32 | 33 | 31 | ~~34~~ | 33 | 30 | 31 | 33 | 33 | 27 | EL | 283 | 34 |
| Khouloud Mansy | Women's Laser Radial | 36 | 39 | 43 | 42 | 43 | 36 | ~~BFD~~ | 40 | 36 | 32 | EL | 347 | 41 |

M = Medal race; EL = Eliminated – did not advance into the medal race

== Shooting ==
Egyptian shooters achieved quota places for the following events by virtue of their best finishes at the 2018 ISSF World Championships, the 2019 ISSF World Cup series, and African Championships, as long as they obtained a minimum qualifying score (MQS) by 31 May 2020.

Men

| Athlete | Event | Qualification | | Final | |
| Athlete | Event | Points | Rank | Points | Rank |
|---|---|---|---|---|---|
| Samy Abdel Razek | 10 m air pistol | 567 | 31 | Did not advance | |
| Osama El-Saeid | 10 m air rifle | 618.8 | 42 | Did not advance | |
| Osama El-Saeid | 50 m rifle 3 positions | 1139 | 38 | Did not advance | |
| Mostafa Hamdy | Skeet | 112 | 29 | Did not advance | |
| Youssef Makkar | 10 m air rifle | 612.0 | 45 | Did not advance | |
| Abdel-Aziz Mehelba | Trap | 121 | 16 | Did not advance | |
| Azmy Mehelba | Skeet | 120 | 19 | Did not advance | |
| Ahmed Zaher | Trap | 120 | 19 | Did not advance | |

Women

| Athlete | Event | Qualification | | Final | |
| Athlete | Event | Points | Rank | Points | Rank |
|---|---|---|---|---|---|
| Radwa Abdel Latif | 10 m air pistol | 560 | 40 | Did not advance | |
| Maggy Ashmawy | Trap | 113 | 22 | Did not advance | |
| Hala El-Gohari | 10 m air pistol | 560 | 41 | Did not advance | |
| Alzahraa Shaban | 10 m air rifle | 620.0 | 38 | Did not advance | |
| Alzahraa Shaban | 50 m rifle 3 positions | 1138-36x | 35 | Did not advance | |

Mixed

| Athlete | Event | Qualification | | Semifinal | | Final / BM | |
| Athlete | Event | Points | Rank | Points | Rank | Opposition Score | Rank |
|---|---|---|---|---|---|---|---|
| Osama El-Saeid; Alzahraa Shaban | 10 m air rifle team | 617.5 | 28 | Did not advance | | | |
| Samy Abdel Razek; Radwa Abdel Latif | 10 m air pistol team | 563 | 18 | Did not advance | | | |
| Abdel-Aziz Mehelba; Maggy Ashmawy | Trap team | 138 | 15 | Did not advance | | | |

== Swimming ==
Egyptian swimmers further achieved qualifying standards in the following events (up to a maximum of 2 swimmers in each event at the Olympic Qualifying Time (OQT), and potentially 1 at the Olympic Selection Time (OST)):

| Athlete | Event | Heat | | Semifinal | | Final | |
| Athlete | Event | Time | Rank | Time | Rank | Time | Rank |
|---|---|---|---|---|---|---|---|
| Marwan El-Kamash | Men's 400 m freestyle | 3:46.94 | 14 | —N/a | | Did not advance | |
| Marwan El-Kamash | Men's 800 m freestyle | 7:52.76 | 16 | —N/a | | Did not advance | |
| Marwan El-Kamash | Men's 1500 m freestyle | DNS | | —N/a | | Did not advance | |
| Ali Khalafalla | Men's 50 m freestyle | 22.22 | =24 | Did not advance | | | |
| Ali Khalafalla | Men's 100 m freestyle | 49.31 | =30 | Did not advance | | | |
| Youssef Ramadan | Men's 100 m butterfly | 51.67 | =14 Q | 52.27 | 16 | Did not advance | |
| Farida Osman | Women's 50 m freestyle | 25.13 | 24 | Did not advance | | | |
| Farida Osman | Women's 100 m freestyle | 55.74 | 33 | Did not advance | | | |
| Farida Osman | Women's 100 m butterfly | 58.69 | 20 | Did not advance | | | |

== Table tennis ==
Egypt entered six athletes into the table tennis competition at the Games. The men's and women's teams secured their respective Olympic berths by winning the gold medal each at the 2019 African Games in Rabat, Morocco, permitting a maximum of two starters to compete each in the men's and women's singles tournament. Moreover, an additional berth was awarded to the Egyptian table tennis players competing in the inaugural mixed doubles by winning the final match against Nigeria at the 2020 African Olympic Qualification Tournament in Tunis, Tunisia.

Men

| Athlete | Event | Preliminary | Round 1 | Round 2 | Round 3 | Round of 16 | Quarterfinals | Semifinals | Final / BM | |
| Athlete | Event | Opposition Result | Opposition Result | Opposition Result | Opposition Result | Opposition Result | Opposition Result | Opposition Result | Opposition Result | Rank |
|---|---|---|---|---|---|---|---|---|---|---|
| Omar Assar | Singles | Bye | | Kou (UKR); W 4–3 | Falck (SWE); W 4–3 | Chuang C-y (TPE); W 4–3 | Ma L (CHN); L 1–4 | Did not advance | | |
| Ahmed Saleh | Singles | Bye | | Gionis (GRE); L 1–4 | Did not advance | | | | | |
| Khalid Assar; Omar Assar; Ahmed Saleh | Team | —N/a | | | | China; L 0–3 | Did not advance | | | |

Women

| Athlete | Event | Preliminary | Round 1 | Round 2 | Round 3 | Round of 16 | Quarterfinals | Semifinals | Final / BM | |
| Athlete | Event | Opposition Result | Opposition Result | Opposition Result | Opposition Result | Opposition Result | Opposition Result | Opposition Result | Opposition Result | Rank |
|---|---|---|---|---|---|---|---|---|---|---|
| Yousra Abdel Razek | Singles | Bye | Yuan (FRA); L 0–4 | Did not advance | | | | | | |
| Dina Meshref | Singles | Bye | | Partyka (POL); W 4–2 | Eerland (NED); L 3–4 | Did not advance | | | | |
| Farah Abdel-Aziz; Yousra Abdel Razek; Dina Meshref | Team | —N/a | | | | Romania; L 0–3 | Did not advance | | | |

Mixed

| Athlete | Event | Round of 16 | Quarterfinals | Semifinals | Final / BM | |
| Athlete | Event | Opposition Result | Opposition Result | Opposition Result | Opposition Result | Rank |
|---|---|---|---|---|---|---|
| Omar Assar; Dina Meshref | Doubles | Lee S-s / Jeon J-h (KOR); W 1–4 | Did not advance | | | |

== Taekwondo ==
Egypt entered four athletes into the taekwondo competition at the Games. Abdelrahman Wael (men's 68 kg), 2014 Youth Olympic bronze medalist Seif Eissa (men's 80 kg), Nour Abdelsalam (women's 49 kg), and Rio 2016 bronze medalist Hedaya Malak (women's 67 kg) secured the spots on the Egyptian squad with a top two finish each in their respective weight classes at the 2020 African Qualification Tournament in Rabat, Morocco.

| Athlete | Event | Qualification | Round of 16 | Quarterfinals | Semifinals | Repechage | Final / BM | |
| Athlete | Event | Opposition Result | Opposition Result | Opposition Result | Opposition Result | Opposition Result | Opposition Result | Rank |
|---|---|---|---|---|---|---|---|---|
| Abdelrahman Wael | Men's −68 kg | Bye | Pérez (ESP); W 22–20 | Husić (BIH); L 7–8 | Did not advance | | | |
| Seif Eissa | Men's −80 kg | —N/a | Marton (AUS); W 12–1 | Alessio (ITA); W 6–5 | Khramtsov (ROC); L 1–13 | Bye | Ordemann (NOR); W12–4 | 3rd place, bronze medalist(s) |
| Nour Abdelsalam | Women's −49 kg | Bye | Yıldırım (TUR); L 20–21 | Did not advance | | | | |
| Hedaya Malak | Women's −67 kg | —N/a | Wiet-Hénin (FRA); W 11–10 | Williams (GBR); L 12–13 | Did not advance | Paseka (TGA); W 19–0 | McPherson (USA); W 17–6 | 3rd place, bronze medalist(s) |

== Tennis ==
Egypt entered two tennis players into the Olympic tournament for the first time in history. Mohamed Safwat and Mayar Sherif secured an outright berth each in the men's and women's singles, respectively, by winning the gold medal at the 2019 African Games in Rabat, Morocco.

| Athlete | Event | Round of 64 | Round of 32 | Round of 16 | Quarterfinals | Semifinals | Final / BM | |
| Athlete | Event | Opposition Result | Opposition Result | Opposition Result | Opposition Result | Opposition Result | Opposition Result | Rank |
|---|---|---|---|---|---|---|---|---|
| Mohamed Safwat | Men's singles | Galán (COL); L 5–7, 1–6 | Did not advance | | | | | |
| Mayar Sherif | Women's singles | Peterson (SWE); L 5–7, 6–7^{(1–7)} | Did not advance | | | | | |

== Triathlon ==
Egypt entered one triathlete to compete at the Olympics for the first time in history. Basmla El-Salamoney topped the field of triathletes vying for qualification from Africa in the women's event based on the individual ITU World Rankings of 15 June 2021.

| Athlete | Event | Time | | | | | | Rank |
| Athlete | Event | Swim (1.5 km) | Trans 1 | Bike (40 km) | Trans 2 | Run (10 km) | Total | Rank |
|---|---|---|---|---|---|---|---|---|
| Basmla El-Salamoney | Women's | 20:41 | 0:50 | Lapped | | | | |

== Wrestling ==
Egypt qualified eight wrestlers for each of the following classes into the Olympic competition. One of them finished among the top six to book an Olympic berth in the men's Greco-Roman 67 kg at the 2019 World Championships, while seven additional licenses were awarded to the Egyptian wrestlers, who progressed to the top two finals of their respective weight categories at the 2021 African & Oceania Qualification Tournament in Hammamet, Tunisia.

Key:

- VT (ranking points: 5–0 or 0–5) – Victory by fall.
- VB (ranking points: 5–0 or 0–5) – Victory by injury (VF for forfeit, VA for withdrawal or disqualification)
- PP (ranking points: 3–1 or 1–3) – Decision by points – the loser with technical points.
- PO (ranking points: 3–0 or 0–3) – Decision by points – the loser without technical points.
- ST (ranking points: 4–0 or 0–4) – Great superiority – the loser without technical points and a margin of victory of at least 8 (Greco-Roman) or 10 (freestyle) points.
- SP (ranking points: 4–1 or 1–4) – Technical superiority – the loser with technical points and a margin of victory of at least 8 (Greco-Roman) or 10 (freestyle) points.

Freestyle

| Athlete | Event | Round of 16 | Quarterfinal | Semifinal | Repechage | Final / BM | |
| Athlete | Event | Opposition Result | Opposition Result | Opposition Result | Opposition Result | Opposition Result | Rank |
|---|---|---|---|---|---|---|---|
| Amr Reda Hussen | Men's −74 kg | Rybicki (POL); W 3–1 ^{PP} | Kaisanov (KAZ); L 1–3 ^{PP} | Did not advance | | | 7 |
| Diaaeldin Kamal | Men's −125 kg | Petriashvili (GEO); L 0–4 ^{ST} | Did not advance | | Deng Zw (CHN); L 1–3 ^{PP} | Did not advance | 10 |
| Enas Mostafa | Women's −68 kg | Schell (GER); L 0–3 ^{PO} | Did not advance | | | | 14 |
| Samar Amer | Women's −76 kg | Vorobieva (ROC); L 1–3 ^{PP} | Did not advance | | | | 10 |

Greco-Roman

| Athlete | Event | Round of 16 | Quarterfinal | Semifinal | Repechage | Final / BM | |
| Athlete | Event | Opposition Result | Opposition Result | Opposition Result | Opposition Result | Opposition Result | Rank |
|---|---|---|---|---|---|---|---|
| Haithem Mahmoud | Men's −60 kg | Emelin (ROC); L 1–3 ^{PP} | Did not advance | | | | 9 |
| Mohamed Ibrahim El-Sayed | Men's −67 kg | Ryu H-s (KOR); W 3–1 ^{PP} | Aslanyan (ARM); W 3–1 ^{PP} | Nasibov (UKR); L 1–3 ^{PP} | Bye | Surkov (ROC); W 3–1 ^{PP} | 3rd place, bronze medalist(s) |
| Mohamed Metwally | Men's −87 kg | Maskevich (BLR); W 4–1 ^{SP} | Grégorich (CUB); W 3–0 ^{PO} | V Lőrincz (HUN); L 1–3 ^{PP} | Bye | Kudla (GER); L 0–5 ^{VT} | 5 |
| Abdellatif Mohamed | Men's −130 kg | Semenov (ROC); L 1–3 ^{PP} | Did not advance | | | | 9 |

== See also ==
- Egypt at the 2020 Summer Paralympics
