= Egypt at the 2022 World Aquatics Championships =

- Flag of Egypt
- World Aquatics code: EGY
- National federation: Egyptian Swimming Federation

in Budapest, Hungary
- Competitors: 24 in 3 sports
- Medals: Gold 0 Silver 0 Bronze 0 Total 0

World Aquatics Championships appearances
- 1973; 1975; 1978; 1982; 1986; 1991; 1994; 1998; 2001; 2003; 2005; 2007; 2009; 2011; 2013; 2015; 2017; 2019; 2022; 2023; 2024; 2025

Egypt competed at the 2022 World Aquatics Championships in Budapest, Hungary from 18 June to 3 July.

== Artistic swimming ==
Women

Athlete	Event	Preliminaries		Final	
Athlete	Event	Points	Rank	Points	Rank
Nadine Barsoum; Nehal Saafan	Duet technical routine	75.3417	20	did not advance	
Farida Abdelbary; Hana Hiekal	Duet free routine	76.1333	21	did not advance	
Farida Abdelbary; Nadine Barsoum; Amina Elfeky; Hana Hiekal; Maryam Maghraby; Sondos Mohamed; Farida Radwan; Nehal Saafan	Team technical routine	75.5103	15	did not advance	
Amina Elfeky; Hana Hiekal; Maryam Maghraby; Sondos Mohamed; Laila Mohsen; Farida Radwan; Nehal Saafan; Malak Toson	Team free routine	77.4333	15	did not advance	

== Diving ==
Men

Athlete	Event	Preliminaries		Semifinals		Final	
Athlete	Event	Points	Rank	Points	Rank	Points	Rank
Mohamed Farouk	1 m springboard	314.95	29	—N/a		did not advance	
Mohamed Farouk	10 m platform	307.55	30	did not advance			
Mohab Ishak	3 m springboard	329.25	34	did not advance			
Mostafa Reyad	3 m springboard	238.70	53	did not advance			
Ramez Sobhy	10 m platform	255.05	39	did not advance			

Women

Athlete	Event	Preliminaries		Semifinals		Final	
Athlete	Event	Points	Rank	Points	Rank	Points	Rank
Maha Eissa	1 m springboard	217.40	26	—N/a		did not advance	
Maha Eissa	3 m springboard	255.30	17	230.20	18	did not advance	
Maha Gouda	1 m springboard	221.30	24	—N/a		did not advance	
Maha Gouda	10 m platform	228.15	28	did not advance			
Farida Moussa	10 m platform	174.70	31	did not advance			

== Swimming ==
Men

Athlete	Event	Heat		Semifinal		Final	
Athlete	Event	Time	Rank	Time	Rank	Time	Rank
Marwan Elkamash	200 m freestyle	1:48.48	28	did not advance			
Marwan Elkamash	400 m freestyle	3:47.21	13	—N/a		did not advance	
Marwan Elkamash	800 m freestyle	7:52.08	13	—N/a		did not advance	
Marwan Elkamash	1500 m freestyle	15:10.80	15	—N/a		did not advance	
Youssef Elkamash	50 m breaststroke	27.92	23	did not advance			
Youssef Elkamash	100 m breaststroke	1:02.04	31	did not advance			
Mohamed Mohamady	200 m backstroke	2:03.84	26	did not advance			
Youssef Ramadan	100 m butterfly	52.42	20	did not advance			
Abdelrahman Sameh	50 m freestyle	22.95	50	did not advance			
Abdelrahman Sameh	50 m butterfly	23.64	23	did not advance			
Mohamed Samy	100 m freestyle	DNS					
Mohamed Samy	50 m backstroke	DNS					
Mohamed Samy	100 m backstroke	54.67	20	did not advance			
Marwan Elkamash; Youssef Ramadan; Abdelrahman Sameh; Mohamed Samy	4 × 100 m freestyle relay	3:19.46	15	—N/a		did not advance	

Women

Athlete	Event	Heat		Semifinal		Final	
Athlete	Event	Time	Rank	Time	Rank	Time	Rank
Farida Osman	50 m freestyle	DNS					
Farida Osman	50 m butterfly	25.95	7 Q	25.46	4 Q	25.38 AF	4
Farida Osman	100 m butterfly	57.76	6 Q	57.91	8 Q	57.66 AF	7
