= Egypt at the 2025 World Aquatics Championships =

- Flag of Egypt
- World Aquatics code: EGY
- National federation: Egyptian Swimming Federation
- Website: www.esf-eg.org

in Singapore
- Competitors: 11 in 3 sports
- Medals: Gold 0 Silver 0 Bronze 0 Total 0

World Aquatics Championships appearances
- 1973; 1975; 1978; 1982; 1986; 1991; 1994; 1998; 2001; 2003; 2005; 2007; 2009; 2011; 2013; 2015; 2017; 2019; 2022; 2023; 2024; 2025

Egypt competed at the 2025 World Aquatics Championships in Singapore from July 11 to August 3, 2025.

== Competitors ==
The following is the list of competitors in the Championships.

Sport	Men	Women	Total
Artistic swimming	0	8	8
Diving	1	1	2
Swimming	1	0	1
Total	2	9	11

== Artistic swimming ==
Women

Athlete	Event	Preliminaries		Final	
Athlete	Event	Points	Rank	Points	Rank
Zeina Amr; Maryam Samer	Duet technical routine	239.4892	21	Did not advance	
Zeina Amr; Maryam Samer	Duet free routine	185.3659	27	Did not advance	

Mixed

Athlete	Event	Preliminaries		Final	
Athlete	Event	Points	Rank	Points	Rank
Mariam Ahmed; Zeina Amr; Salma Marei; Sondos Mohamed; Maryam Samer; Nour Shamala; Amina Tarek; Nour Tharwat	Team technical routine	237.4850	13	Did not advance	
Mariam Ahmed; Zeina Amr; Salma Marei; Sondos Mohamed; Maryam Samer; Nour Shamala; Amina Tarek; Nour Tharwat	Team acrobatic routine	173.6470	15	Did not advance	

== Diving ==
Men

Athlete	Event	Preliminaries		Semifinals		Final	
Athlete	Event	Points	Rank	Points	Rank	Points	Rank
Mohamed Ahmed Farouk	1 m springboard	324.50	24	—		Did not advance	
Mohamed Ahmed Farouk	3 m springboard	381.40	16 Q	351.45	16	Did not advance	

Women

Athlete	Event	Preliminaries		Semifinals		Final	
Athlete	Event	Points	Rank	Points	Rank	Points	Rank
Maha Amer	1 m springboard	230.50	18	—		Did not advance	
Maha Amer	3 m springboard	261.45	19	Did not advance			

== Swimming ==
Egypt entered 1 swimmers.

Men

Athlete	Event	Heat		Semi-final		Final	
Athlete	Event	Time	Rank	Time	Rank	Time	Rank
Abdelrahman Sameh	50 m freestyle	22.35	36	Did not advance			
Abdelrahman Sameh	50 m butterfly	23.21	12 Q	23.12	14	Did not advance	
