= Egypt at the 2017 World Aquatics Championships =

- Flag of Egypt
- World Aquatics code: EGY
- National federation: Egyptian Swimming Federation
- Website: www.esf-eg.org

in Budapest, Hungary
- Competitors: 35 in 4 sports
- Medals Ranked 26th: Gold 0 Silver 0 Bronze 1 Total 1

World Aquatics Championships appearances
- 1973; 1975; 1978; 1982; 1986; 1991; 1994; 1998; 2001; 2003; 2005; 2007; 2009; 2011; 2013; 2015; 2017; 2019; 2022; 2023; 2024; 2025

Egypt is scheduled to compete at the 2017 World Aquatics Championships in Budapest, Hungary from 14 July to 30 July.

== Medalists ==
| Medal | Name | Sport | Event | Date |
|---|---|---|---|---|
| Bronze | Farida Osman | Swimming | Women's 50 m butterfly | July 29 |

== Diving ==
Egypt has entered 6 divers (three male and three female).

Men

| Athlete | Event | Preliminaries | | Semifinals | | Final | |
| Athlete | Event | Points | Rank | Points | Rank | Points | Rank |
|---|---|---|---|---|---|---|---|
| Ammar Hassan | 1 m springboard | 260.65 | 45 | —N/a | | Did not advance | |
| Mohab Mohymen | 1 m springboard | 317.05 | 29 | —N/a | | Did not advance | |
| Youssef Ezzat | 3 m springboard | 293.35 | 47 | Did not advance | | | |
| Ammar Hassan | 3 m springboard | 293.70 | 46 | Did not advance | | | |
| Youssef Ezzat | 10 m platform | 295.70 | 38 | Did not advance | | | |
| Mohab Mohymen | 10 m platform | 293.55 | 39 | Did not advance | | | |

Women

| Athlete | Event | Preliminaries | | Semifinals | | Final | |
| Athlete | Event | Points | Rank | Points | Rank | Points | Rank |
|---|---|---|---|---|---|---|---|
| Maha Abdelsalam | 1 m springboard | 185.65 | 41 | —N/a | | Did not advance | |
| Habiba Ashraf | 1 m springboard | DNS | | —N/a | | Did not advance | |
| Maha Eissa | 3 m springboard | 245.40 | 27 | Did not advance | | | |
| Maha Abdelsalam | 10 m platform | 229.30 | 36 | Did not advance | | | |

Mixed

| Athlete | Event | Final | |
| Athlete | Event | Points | Rank |
|---|---|---|---|
| Maha Abdelsalam; Mohab Mohymen | Team | 284.20 | 17 |

== Open water swimming ==
Egypt has entered seven open water swimmers

| Athlete | Event | Time | Rank |
|---|---|---|---|
| Marwan El-Amrawy | Men's 5 km | 55:05.8 | 23 |
| Marwan El-Amrawy | Men's 10 km | 1:55:01.5 | 42 |
| Youssef Hossameldeen | Men's 10 km | 2:09:25.3 | 60 |
| Adel Ragab | Men's 5 km | 57:57.3 | 49 |
| Sandy Atef | Women's 5 km | 1:06:11.8 | 46 |
| Heba El-Khouly | Women's 5 km | 1:07:39.2 | 50 |
| Reem Kaseem | Women's 10 km | 2:11:57.4 | 47 |
| Dana Khaled | Women's 10 km | Did not finish | |

== Swimming ==
Egyptian swimmers have achieved qualifying standards in the following events (up to a maximum of 2 swimmers in each event at the A-standard entry time, and 1 at the B-standard):

Men

| Athlete | Event | Heat | | Semifinal | | Final | |
| Athlete | Event | Time | Rank | Time | Rank | Time | Rank |
|---|---|---|---|---|---|---|---|
| Youssef Abdalla | 100 m backstroke | 55.60 | 24 | Did not advance | | | |
| Ahmed Akram | 800 m freestyle | 7:51.41 | 9 | —N/a | | Did not advance | |
| Ahmed Akram | 1500 m freestyle | 14:59.56 | 10 | —N/a | | Did not advance | |
| Omar Eissa | 50 m butterfly | 24.43 | 35 | Did not advance | | | |
| Omar Eissa | 100 m butterfly | 54.59 | 51 | Did not advance | | | |
| Marwan El-Kamash | 200 m freestyle | 1:47.40 NR | 16 Q | 1:47.41 | 16 | Did not advance | |
| Marwan El-Kamash | 400 m freestyle | 3:46.36 NR | 9 | —N/a | | Did not advance | |
| Youssef El-Kamash | 50 m breaststroke | 27.79 NR | =27 | Did not advance | | | |
| Youssef El-Kamash | 100 m breaststroke | 1:01.81 | 33 | Did not advance | | | |
| Youssef El-Kamash | 200 m breaststroke | 2:17.43 | 31 | Did not advance | | | |
| Ahmed Hamdy | 400 m individual medley | 4:25.16 | =28 | —N/a | | Did not advance | |
| Mohamed Hussein | 200 m individual medley | 2:00.68 | 17 | Did not advance | | | |
| Ali Khalafalla | 50 m freestyle | 22.23 | =18 | Did not advance | | | |
| Mohamed Samy | 100 m freestyle | 49.42 NR | 32 | Did not advance | | | |
| Mohamed Samy | 50 m backstroke | 25.55 | =25 | Did not advance | | | |
| Youssef Abdalla; Mohamed Hussein; Ali Khalafalla; Mohamed Samy | 4×100 m freestyle relay | 3:18.23 NR | 15 | —N/a | | Did not advance | |
| Ahmed Akram; Marwan El-Amrawy; Marwan El-Kamash; Mohamed Samy | 4×200 m freestyle relay | 7:16.95 NR | 13 | —N/a | | Did not advance | |
| Youssef Abdalla; Omar Eissa; Youssef El-Kamash; Mohamed Samy | 4×100 m medley relay | 3:40.85 NR | 18 | —N/a | | Did not advance | |

Women

| Athlete | Event | Heat | | Semifinal | | Final | |
| Athlete | Event | Time | Rank | Time | Rank | Time | Rank |
|---|---|---|---|---|---|---|---|
| Hania Moro | 400 m freestyle | 4:21.67 | 28 | —N/a | | Did not advance | |
| Hania Moro | 800 m freestyle | 8:54.30 | 26 | —N/a | | Did not advance | |
| Farida Osman | 50 m freestyle | 24.78 AF | 9 Q | 24.62 AF | 9 | Did not advance | |
| Farida Osman | 100 m freestyle | 55.52 | 25 | Did not advance | | | |
| Farida Osman | 50 m butterfly | 25.74 AF | =5 Q | 25.73 AF | 8 Q | 25.39 AF | 3rd place, bronze medalist(s) |
| Farida Osman | 100 m butterfly | 58.67 | 17 | Did not advance | | | |

== Synchronized swimming ==
Egypt's synchronized swimming team consisted of 11 athletes (11 female).

Women

| Athlete | Event | Preliminaries | | Final | |
| Athlete | Event | Points | Rank | Points | Rank |
|---|---|---|---|---|---|
| Dara Hassanien | Solo technical routine | 73.9650 | 18 | Did not advance | |
| Dara Hassanien | Solo free routine | 75.5667 | 22 | Did not advance | |
| Samia Ahmed; Dara Hassanien | Duet technical routine | 75.5396 | 25 | Did not advance | |
| Samia Ahmed; Dara Hassanien | Duet free routine | 75.5667 | 30 | Did not advance | |
| Leila Abdelfattah (R); Samia Ahmed; Aya Helmy (R); Lila Mohsen; Nada Nabil; Marwa Osman; Farida Radwan; Nehal Saafan; Nour Shamala; Farah Tharwat | Team technical routine | 73.7861 | 18 | Did not advance | |
| Leila Abdelfattah; Aya Helmy; Lila Mohsen; Nada Nabil; Marwa Osman (R); Farida Radwan; Nehal Saafan; Nour Shamala; Farah Tharwat | Team free routine | 74.1000 | 21 | Did not advance | |

Legend: (R) = Reserve Athlete
