= Artistic swimming at the 2019 Pan American Games – Women's team =

Women's team at the 2019 Pan American Games
- Venue: Aquatics Centre
- Dates: 29−31 July 2019
- Competitors: 72 from 8 nations
- Winning score: 180.0343

Medalists
Gold medal	Emily Armstrong; Catherine Barrett; Andrée-Anne Côté; Camille Fiola-Dion; Rebecca Harrower; Claudia Holzner; Audrey Joly; Halle Pratt; Jacqueline Simoneau	Canada
Silver medal	Regina Alférez; Teresa Alonso; Nuria Diosdado; Joana Jiménez; Luisa Rodríguez; Jessica Sobrino; Ana Soto; Pamela Toscano; Amaya Velázquez	Mexico
Bronze medal	Anita Alvarez; Paige Areizaga; Nicole Goot; Hannah Heffernan; Daniella Ramirez; Ruby Remati; Abby Remmers; Lindi Schroeder; Emma Tchakmakjian	United States

The women's team competition of the artistic swimming events at the 2019 Pan American Games in Lima were held on 29−31 July at the Aquatics Centre. The Canadian team repeated as Pan American Champions.

All eight teams competed in both rounds of the competition. The first round consisted of a technical, while the second round was a free routine. The winner was the team with the highest combined score.

== Schedule ==
All times are local (UTC−5)

Date	Start	Round
29 July 2019	20:30	Technical routine
31 July 2019	20:30	Free routine

== Results ==
Rank	Country	Athlete	Technical	Free	Total
1st place, gold medalist(s)	Canada	Emily Armstrong; Catherine Barrett; Andrée-Anne Côté; Camille Fiola-Dion; Rebecca Harrower; Claudia Holzner; Audrey Joly; Halle Pratt; Jacqueline Simoneau	88.9398	90.7333	179.6731
2nd place, silver medalist(s)	Mexico	Regina Alférez; Teresa Alonso; Nuria Diosdado; Joana Jiménez; Luisa Rodríguez; Jessica Sobrino; Ana Soto; Pamela Toscano; Amaya Velázquez	86.2910	88.8333	175.1243
3rd place, bronze medalist(s)	United States	Anita Alvarez; Paige Areizaga; Nicole Goot; Hannah Heffernan; Daniella Ramirez; Ruby Remati; Abby Remmers; Lindi Schroeder; Emma Tchakmakjian	84.1447	86.6667	170.8114
4	Brazil	Maria Bruno; Laura Miccuci; Maria Eduarda Miccuci; Lorena Molinos; Anna Giulia Veloso; Jullia Gomes Soares; Luisa Borges; Giovana Stephan; Gabriela Regly	80.3928	80.9000	161.2928
5	Colombia	Estefanía Álvarez; Mónica Arango; Kerly Barrera; Jennifer Cerquera; Ingrid Cubillos; Juliana Jaramillo; Valentina Orozco; Sara Rodríguez; Jhoselyne Taborda	77.9755	80.3333	158.3088
6	Peru	Yamile Carrasco; Maria Ccoyllo; Mariafe Lopez; Carla Morales; Tania Patiño; Andrea Phillips Lescano; Sandy Quiroz; Cielomar Romero; Valeria Romero	73.0739	75.8667	148.9406
7	Cuba	Gabriela Alpajón; Gabriela Batista; Yenifer Cárdenas; Jessica Fernández Barreto; Dyliam Marrero; Rodsany Rodríguez; Stephany Urbina; Soila Valdés; Cire Zuferri	64.8664	66.0333	130.8997
8	Guatemala	Sofia Barillas; Adaya Gamez; Ninoshka Gamez; Yarin Gamez; Rebecka Gonzalez; Fatima Leal; Jennifer Paniagua; Keren Rivera; Rebeca Urias	62.5421	62.2667	124.8088
