= Artistic swimming at the 2019 Pan American Games =

- Artistic swimming pictogram
- Venue: Aquatics Centre
- Dates: July 29–31, 2019
- Competitors: 80 from 12 nations

Artistic swimming competitions at the 2019 Pan American Games in Lima, Peru are scheduled were held between July 29 and 31, 2019 at the Aquatics Centre in the Villa Deportiva Nacional Videna cluster.

The sport was renamed from synchronized swimming to artistic swimming in 2017, making this the first edition of the Pan American Games to have the new title. The competition was open to only women, and two competitions were held: duet and team.

The highest ranked team and the highest ranked duet will qualify for the 2020 Summer Olympics in Tokyo, Japan. If the highest ranked team and duet are from the same country, the second ranked duet will qualify.

== Competition schedule ==
The following is the competition schedule for the artistic swimming competitions:

T	Technical routine	F	Free routine

Event↓/Date →	Mon 29	Wed 31
Duet	T	F
Team	T	F

== Medal summary ==
=== Medal table ===
Rank	Nation	Gold	Silver	Bronze	Total
1	Canada	2	0	0	2
2	Mexico	0	2	0	2
3	United States	0	0	2	2
Totals (3 entries)		2	2	2	6

=== Medalists ===
Event	Gold	Silver	Bronze
Duet	Canada; Claudia Holzner; Jacqueline Simoneau	Mexico; Nuria Diosdado; Joana Jiménez	United States; Anita Alvarez; Ruby Remati
Team	Canada; Emily Armstrong; Catherine Barrett; Andrée-Anne Côté; Camille Fiola-Dion; Rebecca Harrower; Claudia Holzner; Audrey Joly; Halle Pratt; Jacqueline Simoneau	Mexico; Regina Alférez; Teresa Alonso; Nuria Diosdado; Joana Jiménez; Luisa Rodríguez; Jessica Sobrino; Ana Soto; Pamela Toscano; Amaya Velázquez	United States; Anita Alvarez; Paige Areizaga; Nicole Goot; Hannah Heffernan; Daniella Ramirez; Ruby Remati; Abby Remmers; Lindi Schroeder; Emma Tchakmakjian

== Participating nations ==
A total of 12 countries qualified athletes. The number of athletes a nation entered is in parentheses beside the name of the country.

- Argentina (2)
- Aruba (2)
- Brazil (9)
- Canada (9)
- Chile (2)
- Colombia (9)
- Cuba (9)
- El Salvador (2)
- Guatemala (9)
- Mexico (9)
- Peru (9)
- United States (9)

== Qualification ==
A total of 80 artistic swimmers will qualify to compete at the games. As host nation, Peru qualifies the maximum team size of nine athletes. Seven other teams will qualify (each with nine athletes). Each team will also be required to compete in the duet event with athletes already qualified for the team event. A further four countries will qualify a duet only.

== See also ==
- Artistic swimming at the 2020 Summer Olympics
