= Egypt at the 2023 World Aquatics Championships =

- Flag of Egypt
- FINA code: EGY
- National federation: Egyptian Swimming Federation
- Website: www.esf-eg.org

in Fukuoka, Japan
- Competitors: 28 in 4 sports
- Medals: Gold 0 Silver 0 Bronze 0 Total 0

World Aquatics Championships appearances
- 1973; 1975; 1978; 1982; 1986; 1991; 1994; 1998; 2001; 2003; 2005; 2007; 2009; 2011; 2013; 2015; 2017; 2019; 2022; 2023; 2024

Egypt competed at the 2023 World Aquatics Championships in Fukuoka, Japan from 14 to 30 July.

== Artistic swimming ==
Egypt entered 12 artistic swimmers.

Women

Athlete	Event	Preliminaries		Final	
Athlete	Event	Points	Rank	Points	Rank
Nadine Barsoum	Solo technical routine	174.5900	16	Did not advance	
Hana Hiekal; Malak Toson	Duet free routine	144.0021	20	Did not advance	
Hana Hiekal; Malak Toson	Duet technical routine	179.0300	24	Did not advance	

Mixed

Athlete	Event	Preliminaries		Final	
Athlete	Event	Points	Rank	Points	Rank
Mariam Ahmed; Nadine Barsoum; Amina Elfeky; Salma Marei; Sondos Mohamed; Laila Mohsen; Nihal Saafan; Amina Tarek	Team acrobatic routine	178.4466	12 Q	177.6833	11
Mariam Ahmed; Amina Elfeky; Malak Hebesha; Hana Hiekal; Salma Marei; Sondos Mohamed; Laila Mohsen; Nihal Saafan	Team free routine	194.4771	10 Q	179.6291	12
Farida Abdelbary; Nadine Barsoum; Hana Hiekal; Salma Marei; Sondos Mohamed; Laila Mohsen; Nihal Saafan; Malak Toson	Team technical routine	195.2551	12 Q	214.1084	10

== Diving ==
Egypt entered 4 divers.

Men

Athlete	Event	Preliminaries		Semifinals		Final	
Athlete	Event	Points	Rank	Points	Rank	Points	Rank
Mohamed Farouk	1 m springboard	287.70	39	—		Did not advance	
Mohamed Farouk	3 m springboard	266.60	61	Did not advance			
Mohab Ishak	3 m springboard	268.30	60	Did not advance			
Mohamed Noaman	1 m springboard	248.50	52	—		Did not advance	

Women

Athlete	Event	Preliminaries		Semifinals		Final	
Athlete	Event	Points	Rank	Points	Rank	Points	Rank
Maha Eissa	1 m springboard	237.60	11 Q	—		264.55	5
Maha Eissa	3 m springboard	219.75	38	Did not advance			

Mixed

Athlete	Event	Final	
Athlete	Event	Points	Rank
Maha Eissa; Mohamed Farouk	Synchronized 3 m springboard	256.08	9

== Open water swimming ==
Egypt entered 2 open water swimmers.

Women

Athlete	Event	Time	Rank
Lamees El-Sokkary	Women's 5 km	1:02:28.1	34
Lamees El-Sokkary	Women's 10 km	2:12:49.6	43
Nadine Karim	Women's 5 km	1:05:59.2	46
Nadine Karim	Women's 10 km	2:13:29.1	46

== Swimming ==
Egypt entered 10 swimmers.

Men

Athlete	Event	Heat		Semifinal		Final	
Athlete	Event	Time	Rank	Time	Rank	Time	Rank
Ahmed Akram	1500 metre freestyle	15:11.06	21	—		Did not advance	
Youssef El-Kamash	50 metre breaststroke	27.80	26	Did not advance			
Marwan Elkamash	400 metre freestyle	3:48.31	15	—		Did not advance	
Marwan Elkamash	800 metre freestyle	7:46.55 NR	10	—		Did not advance	
Marwan Elkamash	1500 metre freestyle	14:55.19	9	—		Did not advance	
Yassin Hossam	50 metre backstroke	25.07	14 Q	25.22	16	Did not advance	
Ali Khalafalla	50 metre freestyle	22.30	31	Did not advance			
Mohamed Mohamady	200 metre backstroke	2:02.23	28	Did not advance			
Abdalla Nasr	200 metre butterfly	2:00.17	27	Did not advance			
Youssef Ramadan	100 metre freestyle	48.77 NR	26	Did not advance			
Youssef Ramadan	100 metre butterfly	52.31	27	Did not advance			
Abdelrahman Sameh	50 metre butterfly	23.10 NR	4 Q	22.94 NR	5 Q	23.34	8

Women

Athlete	Event	Heat		Semifinal		Final	
Athlete	Event	Time	Rank	Time	Rank	Time	Rank
Farida Osman	50 metre freestyle	24.86	15 Q	25.34	16	Did not advance	
Farida Osman	50 metre butterfly	25.77	5 Q	25.74	6 Q	25.62	4
Farida Osman	100 metre butterfly	59.09	19	Did not advance			
