= Artistic swimming at the 2020 Summer Olympics – Qualification =

This article details the qualifying phase for artistic swimming at the 2020 Summer Olympics. (The Olympics was postponed to at least 2021 due to the COVID-19 pandemic). The competition at these Games will comprise a total of 104 athletes coming from their respective NOCs; each has been allowed to enter a maximum of eight if qualified in the women's team and two if qualified only for the women's duet. NOCs qualified in the team event may select two of the team members to compete in the duet. Host nation Japan is considered the Asian continental representative, having reserved a spot on all events.

For the team competitions, the best ranked NOC in each of the five continental championships, with the exception of the host country Japan which will represent the Asian continent, obtains a secured place for the Games, while the remaining NOCs will compete for the two highest-ranked spots at the 2019 World Aquatics Championships and the three highest-ranked spots at the Olympic Qualification Tournament. For the duet, the best ranked NOC in each of the five continental championships that do not have a qualified team assures a secured spot, while the other seven top-ranked NOCs will be selected through Olympic Qualification Tournament. All 10 NOCs that have already qualified in the team event each automatically qualify two synchronized swimmers (who must be members of the team) to form a duet.

== Timeline ==
Event	Date	Venue
European Champions Cup	May 10–12, 2019	(Russia) Saint Petersburg
2019 FINA World Championships	July 12–20, 2019	(South Korea) Gwangju
African Continental Selection	July 12–20, 2019	(South Korea) Gwangju
Asian Continental Selection	July 12–20, 2019	(South Korea) Gwangju
Oceania Continental Selection	July 12–20, 2019	(South Korea) Gwangju
2019 Pan American Games	July 29–31, 2019	(Peru) Lima
2021 FINA Olympic Qualification Tournament	June 10–13, 2021	(Spain) Barcelona

== Qualification summary ==
Nation	Team	Duet	Athletes
Australia	Yes	Yes	8
Austria		Yes	2
Belarus		Yes	2
Canada	Yes	Yes	8
China	Yes	Yes	8
Colombia		Yes	2
Egypt	Yes	Yes	8
France		Yes	2
Great Britain		Yes	2
Greece	Yes	Yes	8
Italy	Yes	Yes	8
Israel		Yes	2
Japan	Yes	Yes	8
Kazakhstan		Yes	2
Liechtenstein		Yes	2
Mexico		Yes	2
Netherlands		Yes	2
ROC	Yes	Yes	8
South Africa		Yes	2
Spain	Yes	Yes	8
Ukraine	Yes	Yes	8
United States		Yes	2
Total: 22 NOCs	80	44	104

== Women's team ==
Event	Place	Qualified team
Host nation	1	Japan
African Continental Selection (2019 Worlds)	1	Egypt
2019 Pan American Games	1	Canada
2019 European Champions Cup	1	ROC
Oceania Continental Selection (2019 Worlds)	1	Australia
2019 FINA World Championships	2	China; Ukraine
2021 Olympic Qualifying Tournament	3	Italy; Spain; Greece
Total	10	

== Women's duet ==
Event	Place	Qualified NOC
Qualified in the team event	10	Australia; Canada; China; Greece; Italy; Egypt; Japan; ROC; Spain; Ukraine
African Continental Selection (2019 Worlds)	1	South Africa
2019 Pan American Games	1	Mexico
Asian Continental Selection (2019 Worlds)	1	Kazakhstan
2019 European Champions Cup	1	Great Britain
Oceania Continental Selection (2019 Worlds)	0	~~New Zealand~~^{1}
2021 Olympic Qualifying Tournament	8	Austria; France; Belarus; Netherlands; United States; Israel; Liechtenstein; Colombia
Total	22	

^1 – New Zealand declined the duet quota.
