= Egypt at the 2024 World Aquatics Championships =

- Flag of Egypt
- FINA code: EGY
- National federation: Egyptian Swimming Federation
- Website: www.esf-eg.org

in Doha, Qatar
- Competitors: 20 in 3 sports
- Medals Ranked 31st: Gold 0 Silver 0 Bronze 2 Total 2

World Aquatics Championships appearances
- 1973; 1975; 1978; 1982; 1986; 1991; 1994; 1998; 2001; 2003; 2005; 2007; 2009; 2011; 2013; 2015; 2017; 2019; 2022; 2023; 2024

Egypt competed at the 2024 World Aquatics Championships in Doha, Qatar from 2 to 18 February.

== Medalists ==
Medal	Name	Sport	Event	Date
3rd place, bronze medalist(s)	Maha Amer	Diving	Women's 1 metre springboard	2 February 2024
3rd place, bronze medalist(s)	Farida Osman	Swimming	Women's 50 metre butterfly	17 February 2024

== Competitors ==
The following is the list of competitors in the Championships.

Sport	Men	Women	Total
Artistic swimming	0	11	11
Diving	4	2	6
Swimming	2	1	3
Total	6	14	20

== Artistic swimming ==
Women

Athlete	Event	Preliminaries		Final	
Athlete	Event	Points	Rank	Points	Rank
Nadine Barsoum	Solo technical routine	203.3500	18	Did not advamce	
Hana Hiekal; Malak Toson	Duet technical routine	203.7000	25	Did not advamce	
Nadine Barsoum; Hana Hiekal	Duet free routine	183.8062	16	Did not advamce	

Mixed

Athlete	Event	Preliminaries		Final	
Athlete	Event	Points	Rank	Points	Rank
Farida Abdelbary; Mariam Ahmed; Nadine Barsoum; Hana Hiekal; Salma Marei; Sondos Mohamed; Nihal Saafan; Malak Toson	Team technical routine	189.2367	13	Did not advamce	
Mariam Ahmed; Nadine Barsoum; Amina Elfeky; Hana Hiekal; Salma Marei; Sondos Mohamed; Nihal Saafan; Malak Toson	Team free routine	182.5937	15	Did not advamce	
Mariam Ahmed; Amina Elfeky; Hana Hiekal; Salma Marei; Sondos Mohamed; Laila Mohsen; Nihal Saafan; Malak Toson	Team acrobatic routine	186.9534	11 Q	196.3433	8

== Diving ==
Men

Athlete	Event	Preliminaries		Semifinals		Final	
Athlete	Event	Points	Rank	Points	Rank	Points	Rank
Mohamed Farouk	1 m springboard	292.55	21	—		Did not advance	
Mohamed Farouk	3 m springboard	404.70	6 Q	366.80	16	Did not advance	
Omar El-Sayed	10 m platform	315.10	33	Did not advance			
Mohamed Noaman	1 m springboard	305.65	18	—		Did not advance	
Mohamed Noaman	3 m springboard	325.50	39	Did not advance			
Ramez Sobhy	10 m platform	233.50	45	Did not advance			

Women

Athlete	Event	Preliminaries		Semifinals		Final	
Athlete	Event	Points	Rank	Points	Rank	Points	Rank
Maha Amer	1 m springboard	257.95	1 Q	—		257.15	3rd place, bronze medalist(s)
Maha Amer	3 m springboard	233.05	26	Did not advance			
Malak Tawfik	10 m platform	175.65	42	Did not advance			

== Swimming ==
Egypt entered 3 swimmers.

Men

Athlete	Event	Heat		Semifinal		Final	
Athlete	Event	Time	Rank	Time	Rank	Time	Rank
Ahmed Akaram	1500 metre freestyle	15:28.54	23	—		Did not advance	
Abdalla Nasr	100 metre butterfly	53.31	27	Did not advance			
Abdalla Nasr	200 metre butterfly	1:57.85 NR	18	Did not advance			

Women

Athlete	Event	Heat		Semifinal		Final	
Athlete	Event	Time	Rank	Time	Rank	Time	Rank
Farida Osman	50 metre freestyle	25.01	12 Q	25.07	16	Did not advance	
Farida Osman	50 metre butterfly	25.88	4 Q	25.80	3 Q	25.67	3rd place, bronze medalist(s)
Farida Osman	100 metre butterfly	59.11	13 Q	59.12	15	Did not advance	
