= Lindi Schroeder =

American swimmer

Personal information
- Nationality: United States
- Born: September 22, 2001 (age 25) Boston, Massachusetts, U.S.
- Height: 5 ft 8 in (173 cm)

Sport
- Sport: Synchronized swimming
- College team: Stanford University
Medal record
Women's artistic swimming
Representing United States
Pan American Games
Bronze medal – third place	2019 Lima	Team

Lindi Schroeder (born September 22, 2001) is an American swimmer.

She represented Team USA in the 2020 Tokyo Olympics, where she competed in the artistic swimming (women's duet) event alongside Anita Álvarez.

The pair finished thirteen in their preliminary, failing to advance to the final.

== Career highlights ==
- 2014 UANA Pan American Championships: 4th (Figures), 1st (Team)
- 2015 Mediterranean Cup: 13th (Figures)
- 2015 UANA Pan American Championships: 1st (Team)
- 2016 U.S. National Championships: 1st (13-15 Figures), 1st (13-15 Solo), 4th (Junior Figures), 3rd (Junior Duet)
- 2016 13-15 and Junior National Team
- 2016 Mediterranean Cup: 4th (Solo)
- 2016 UANA Pan American Championships: 1st (13-15 Solo), 1st (Figures)
- 2017 Swiss Open: 2nd (Tech Team)
- 2017 Junior/Senior National Team
- 2018 UANA Pan American Championships: 1st (Team)
- 2019 Pan American Games Bronze Medalist
- 2019 US Open: 2nd (Team), 3rd (Free Duet)
- 2019 Spanish Open: 6th (Tech Team), 7th (Free Team), 6th (Free Duet)
- 2020 French Open: 3rd (Tech Duet), 3rd (Free Duet), 2nd (Tech Team)
- 2021 FINA Artistic Swimming Virtual World Series USA: 1st (Tech Duet), 1st (Free Duet), 1st (Free Team)
- 2021 FINA Artistic Swimming Virtual World Series Canada: 1st (Tech Duet), 1st (Free Duet), 1st (Free Team)
- 2021 FINA Artistic Swimming World Series Super Final: 4th (Duet Tech), 5th (Duet Free), 4th (Team Tech), 4th (Team Free)
