= Artistic swimming at the 2019 Pan American Games – Women's duet =

Women's duet at the 2019 Pan American Games
- Venue: Aquatics Centre
- Dates: 29−31 July 2019
- Competitors: 24 from 12 nations
- Winning score: 180.0343

Medalists
Gold medal	Claudia Holzner; Jacqueline Simoneau	Canada
Silver medal	Nuria Diosdado; Joana Jiménez	Mexico
Bronze medal	Anita Alvarez; Ruby Remati	United States

The women's duet competition of the artistic swimming events at the 2019 Pan American Games in Lima was held on 29−31 July at the Aquatics Centre. Canada repeated as Pan American Champions.

All twelve duets competed in both rounds of the competition. The first round consisted of a technical, while the second round was a free routine. The winner was the duet with the highest combined score.

== Schedule ==
All times are local (UTC−5)

Date	Start	Round
29 July 2019	12:00	Technical routine
31 July 2019	12:00	Free routine

== Results ==
Rank	Country	Athlete	Technical	Free	Total
1st place, gold medalist(s)	Canada	Claudia Holzner; Jacqueline Simoneau	89.3343	90.7000	180.0343
2nd place, silver medalist(s)	Mexico	Nuria Diosdado; Joana Jiménez	86.3328	88.0333	174.3661
3rd place, bronze medalist(s)	United States	Anita Alvarez; Ruby Remati	84.7365	85.9333	170.6698
4	Brazil	Luisa Borges; Laura De Souza	80.4881	81.7333	162.2214
5	Colombia	Estefanía Álvarez; Mónica Arango	79.2052	80.5667	159.7719
6	Argentina	Camila Arregui; Trinidad López	75.1817	77.6667	152.8484
7	Chile	Isidora Letelier; Natalie Lubascher	73.0259	75.4000	148.4259
8	Aruba	Abigail de Veer; Kyra Hoevertsz	73.1148	75.0333	148.1481
9	Peru	Carla Morales; Cielomar Romero	70.8877	74.3667	145.2544
10	Guatemala	Adaya Gamez; Ninoshka Gamez	64.4536	65.0000	129.4536
11	El Salvador	Fernanda Cruz; Grecia Mendoza	63.1943	65.4333	128.6276
12	Cuba	Gabriela Alpajón; Soila Valdés	61.6568	63.3333	124.9901
