= Anita Alvarez (synchronized swimmer) =

American synchronized swimmer (born 1996)

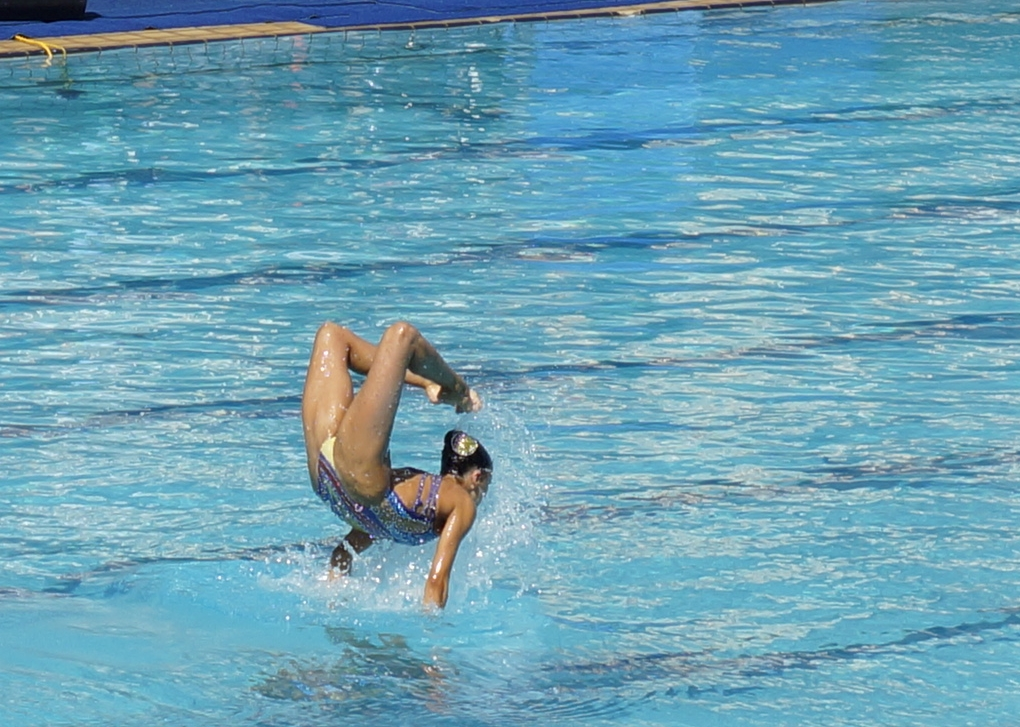
- Alvarez at the 2016 Summer Olympics

Personal information
- Born: December 2, 1996 (age 29) Amherst, New York, U.S.
- Height: 5 ft 7 in (1.70 m)
- Weight: 115 lb (52 kg)

Sport
- Country: United States
- Sport: Artistic swimming
Medal record
Artistic swimming
Representing United States
Olympic Games
Silver medal – second place	2024 Paris	Team
World Championships
Silver medal – second place	2023 Fukuoka	Team acrobatic routine
Bronze medal – third place	2023 Fukuoka	Team technical routine
Bronze medal – third place	2024 Doha	Team acrobatic routine
Bronze medal – third place	2024 Doha	Team free routine
Pan American Games
Silver medal – second place	2023 Santiago	Team
Bronze medal – third place	2019 Lima	Women's team

Anita Alvarez (born December 2, 1996) is an American artistic and synchronized swimmer. Originally from Buffalo, New York, she attended Kenmore West Senior High School, from which she graduated in 2014. She began her professional synchronized swimming career after she graduated.

== Career ==
Alvarez competed in the women's duet at the 2016 Summer Olympics with Mariya Koroleva, finishing 9th. She is a member of the USA Synchronized Swimming National Team. She competed at the 2015 World Championships in Kazan and at the 2014 Junior World Championships.

Previously, Alvarez coached intramural swimming in Western New York. As coach for Walnut Creek Aquanuts, she saw them to the 2019 Junior Olympics in Buffalo, New York. That year she also won a bronze medal with the United States women's team at the 2019 Pan American Games.

She qualified to represent the United States at the 2020 Summer Olympics in the women's duet, alongside Lindi Schroeder. The pair finished 13th in their preliminary, failing to advance to the final.

Alvarez was named USA Synchro Athlete of the Year along with Mariya Koroleva in 2016 and in 2019. She was also named USA's Artistic Swimming Athlete of the Year in 2021.

At the end of her solo free routine at the 2022 World Aquatics Championships in Budapest on June 22, Alvarez fainted in the pool and sank to the bottom. Her coach Andrea Fuentes jumped into the pool to rescue her and she received medical attention afterward. FINA subsequently barred her from participating in the team free routine final on June 24. Alvarez had previously fainted during the FINA Olympic Qualification Tournament in Barcelona in June 2021, also being rescued by Fuentes on that occasion.

Alvarez went on to win silver medals with the United States team at the 2023 Pan American Games and the 2024 Summer Olympics.
