= Rebecca Harrower =

Canadian synchronized swimmer

Personal information
- Born: 6 June 1996 (age 30) Edmonton, Alberta
- Height: 168 cm (5 ft 6 in)
- Weight: 55 kg (121 lb)

Sport
- Sport: Swimming
- Strokes: Synchronized swimming
Medal record
Women's synchronized swimming
Representing Canada
Pan American Games
Gold medal – first place	2019 Lima	Team

Rebecca Harrower (born 6 June 1996) was a Canadian synchronized swimmer, Harrower joined the national team in 2014. Armstrong won a gold medal in the team artistic swimming category at the 2019 Pan American Games. Harrower was a training member of Canada's national team in the lead-up to the delayed 2020 Summer Olympics which were postponed as a result of the COVID-19 pandemic.
