= Andrée-Anne Côté =

Canadian synchronized swimmer

Personal information
- Born: 27 March 1998 (age 28) Quebec City, Quebec, Canada
- Height: 172 cm (5 ft 8 in)
- Weight: 65 kg (143 lb)

Sport
- Sport: Swimming
- Strokes: Synchronized swimming
Medal record
Women's synchronized swimming
Representing Canada
Pan American Games
Gold medal – first place	2019 Lima	Team

Andrée-Anne Côté (born 27 March 1998) is a Canadian synchronized swimmer having been a member of the team since 2016. Côté won a gold medal in the team artistic swimming category at the 2019 Pan American Games. Côté was a training member of Canada's national team in the lead-up to the delayed 2020 Summer Olympics which were postponed as a result of the COVID-19 pandemic.
