= Claudia Holzner =

Canadian synchronized swimmer

Personal information
- Born: 8 February 1994 (age 32) Calgary, Alberta, Canada
- Height: 170 cm (5 ft 7 in)
- Weight: 64 kg (141 lb)

Sport
- Sport: Swimming
- Strokes: Synchronized swimming
Medal record
Women's synchronized swimming
Representing Canada
Pan American Games
Gold medal – first place	2015 Toronto	Team
Gold medal – first place	2019 Lima	Duet
Gold medal – first place	2019 Lima	Team

Claudia Holzner (born 8 February 1994) is a Canadian synchronized swimmer. She represented Canada at the 2020 Summer Olympics held in Tokyo, Japan. She also represented Canada at the World Aquatics Championships in 2013, 2015, 2017 and 2019.

In July 2019, she represented Canada at the 2019 World Aquatics Championships held in Gwangju, South Korea and she competed both in the duet technical routine and duet free routine events. In the same month, she won the gold medal in the women's duet and women's team events at the 2019 Pan American Games held in Lima, Peru.
