= Ana Soto =

Indigenous warrior in present-day Venezuela (born 1668

Ana Soto or Anasoli (died 6 August 1668) was a Gayón warrior woman who became a leader and led her 2,000 army against the Spanish colonialists for fifty years in present-day Venezuela.

Ana Soto was born in the Spanish mission of Bobare. As a child, she witnessed the murder of her parents and other relatives by the conquistadors, but managed to escape to the mountains, where she became a warrior and leader. In 1618, together with her husband “El Tigre” and her niece Inguet Yio, in the territory of present-day Lara (state), she organized some 2,000 soldiers to defend her territory, battles that lasted until her execution on 6 August 1668.

In 2022, a request was made to transfer her remains to the National Pantheon of Venezuela.
