= Audrey Joly =

Canadian synchronized swimmer

Personal information
- Born: 29 June 1998 (age 28) Saint-Eustache, Quebec
- Height: 160 cm (5 ft 3 in)
- Weight: 49 kg (108 lb)

Sport
- Sport: Swimming
- Strokes: Synchronized swimming
Medal record
Women's synchronized swimming
Representing Canada
Pan American Games
| Gold medal – first place | 2019 Lima | Team |

Audrey Joly (born 19 June 1998) is a Canadian synchronized swimmer, joining the national team in 2017. Joly won a gold medal in the team artistic swimming category at the 2019 Pan American Games. She placed sixth in the team competition at the 2016 FINA World Junior Synchronised Swimming Championships. Joly was a training member of Canada's national team in the lead-up to the delayed 2020 Summer Olympics which were postponed as a result of the COVID-19 pandemic.
