= Camille Fiola-Dion =

Canadian synchronized swimmer

Personal information
- Born: 24 March 1998 (age 28) Rimouski, Quebec, Canada
- Height: 168 cm (5 ft 6 in)
- Weight: 56 kg (123 lb)

Sport
- Sport: Swimming
- Strokes: Synchronized swimming
Medal record
Women's synchronized swimming
Representing Canada
Pan American Games
Gold medal – first place	2019 Lima	Team

Camille Fiola-Dion (born 24 March 1998 in Rimouski, Quebec) is a Canadian synchronized swimmer, joining the national team in 2017. Fiola-Dion won a gold medal in the team artistic swimming category at the 2019 Pan American Games. Fiola-Dion was a training member of Canada's national team in the lead-up to the delayed 2020 Summer Olympics which were postponed as a result of the COVID-19 pandemic.
