= Nora Azmy =

Egyptian synchronized swimmer (born 2000)

Personal information
- Nationality: Egypt
- Born: 1 August 2000 (age 25)

Sport
- Sport: Synchronized swimming
- Event: Women's team

Nora Azmy (born 1 August 2000) is an Egyptian synchronized swimmer. She competed in the 2020 Summer Olympics.
