= Jayda Sharaf =

Egyptian synchronised swimmer

Personal information
- Nationality: Egyptian
- Born: 17 May 2001 (age 24); Cairo, Egypt

Sport
- Country: Egypt
- Sport: Artistic swimming

Jayda Sharaf (Arabic: جيداء شرف, born 17 May 2001) is an Egyptian artistic swimmer. She represented Egypt at the 2020 Summer Olympics, held July–August 2021 in Tokyo.

== Life ==
She was born in Cairo, Egypt. She started Artistic Swimming at the age of 9 1/5, she has represented Egypt in the Fina World Junior Artistic Swimming Championships 2018 Budapest, Hungary, and the 18th FINA World Championships 2019 in Gwangju, South Korea.

Previously, Jayda moved with her family for 1 year and a half to South Africa, 2013 - 2014, where she was the South African Champion in her age class and was selected to represent the Under 15 national team in the Comen Cup 2014, Alexandroupolis before returning to train in Egypt.

She qualified in the women's team event at the 2020 Summer Olympics.
