= Catherine Barrett (artistic swimmer) =

Canadian artistic swimmer

Personal information
- Nationality: Canada
- Born: June 19, 2000 (age 26) St. John's, Newfoundland
- Height: 160 cm (5 ft 3 in)

Sport
- Sport: Swimming
- Strokes: Artistic swimming
Medal record
Representing Canada
Artistic swimming
Pan American Games
Gold medal – first place	2019 Lima	Women's team

Catherine Barrett (born June 19, 2000) is a Canadian artistic swimmer.
