= Emily Armstrong (artistic swimmer) =

Canadian synchronized swimmer

Personal information
- Born: September 10, 2000 (age 26) Toronto, Ontario
- Height: 165 cm (5 ft 5 in)
- Weight: 53 kg (117 lb)

Sport
- Sport: Swimming
- Strokes: Synchronized swimming
- College team: Ohio State
Medal record
Women's synchronized swimming
Representing Canada
Pan American Games
Gold medal – first place	2019 Lima	Team

Emily Armstrong (born September 10, 2000) is a Canadian synchronized swimmer. Armstrong won a gold medal in the team artistic swimming category at the 2019 Pan American Games. She competed at the 2018 FINA World Junior Synchronised Swimming Championships where she placed 6th in solo free, 8th in solo technical, and 8th in duet technical. Armstrong was a training member of Canada's national team in the lead-up to the delayed 2020 Summer Olympics which were postponed as a result of the COVID-19 pandemic.

As of 2023–24, Armstrong competes as part of the Ohio State Buckeyes artistic swimming team at The Ohio State University.
