= Halle Pratt =

Canadian synchronized swimmer

Personal information
- Born: 6 October 1999 (age 26) Edmonton, Alberta, Canada
- Height: 171 cm (5 ft 7 in)
- Weight: 60 kg (132 lb)

Sport
- Sport: Swimming
- Strokes: Synchronized swimming
Medal record
Women's synchronized swimming
Representing Canada
Pan American Games
Gold medal – first place	2019 Lima	Team

Halle Pratt (born 6 October 1999) is a Canadian synchronized swimmer, joining the national team in 2017. Pratt won a gold medal in the team artistic swimming category at the 2019 Pan American Games. She placed sixth in the team competition at the 2016 FINA World Junior Synchronised Swimming Championships. Pratt was a training member of Canada's national team in the lead-up to the delayed 2020 Summer Olympics which were postponed as a result of the COVID-19 pandemic. Her brother is Cole Pratt who competes on Canada's competitive swimming team in the backstroke and medley events.
