= Maryam Maghraby =

Egyptian synchronized swimmer

Personal information
- Nationality: Egypt
- Born: 7 October 2004 (age 20)
- Height: 1.62 m (5 ft 4 in)
- Weight: 49 kg (108 lb)

Sport
- Sport: Synchronized swimming
- Club: Gezira club

Maryam Maghraby (born 7 October 2004) is an Egyptian synchronized swimmer. She competed in the 2017 Comen cup 2018 Comen cup and 2020 Summer Olympics.
