= Shahd Samer =

Egyptian synchronized swimmer

Personal information
- Full name: Shahd Abdallah Samer
- Nationality: Egypt
- Born: 1 January 2003 (age 22)

Sport
- Sport: Synchronized swimming

Shahd Abdallah Samer (Arabic: شهد عبدالله سامر, born 1 January 2003) is an Egyptian synchronized swimmer. She competed in the 2020 Summer Olympics.
