= Hanna Hiekal =

Egyptian synchronized swimmer

Personal information
- Nationality: Egypt
- Born: 23 July 2002 (age 23); Cairo, Egypt

Sport
- Sport: Synchronized swimming
- Event(s): Women's duet Women's team

Hanna Hiekal (born 23 July 2002) is an Egyptian synchronized swimmer. She competed in the 2020 Summer Olympics.
