= Jacqueline Simoneau =

Canadian synchronized swimmer

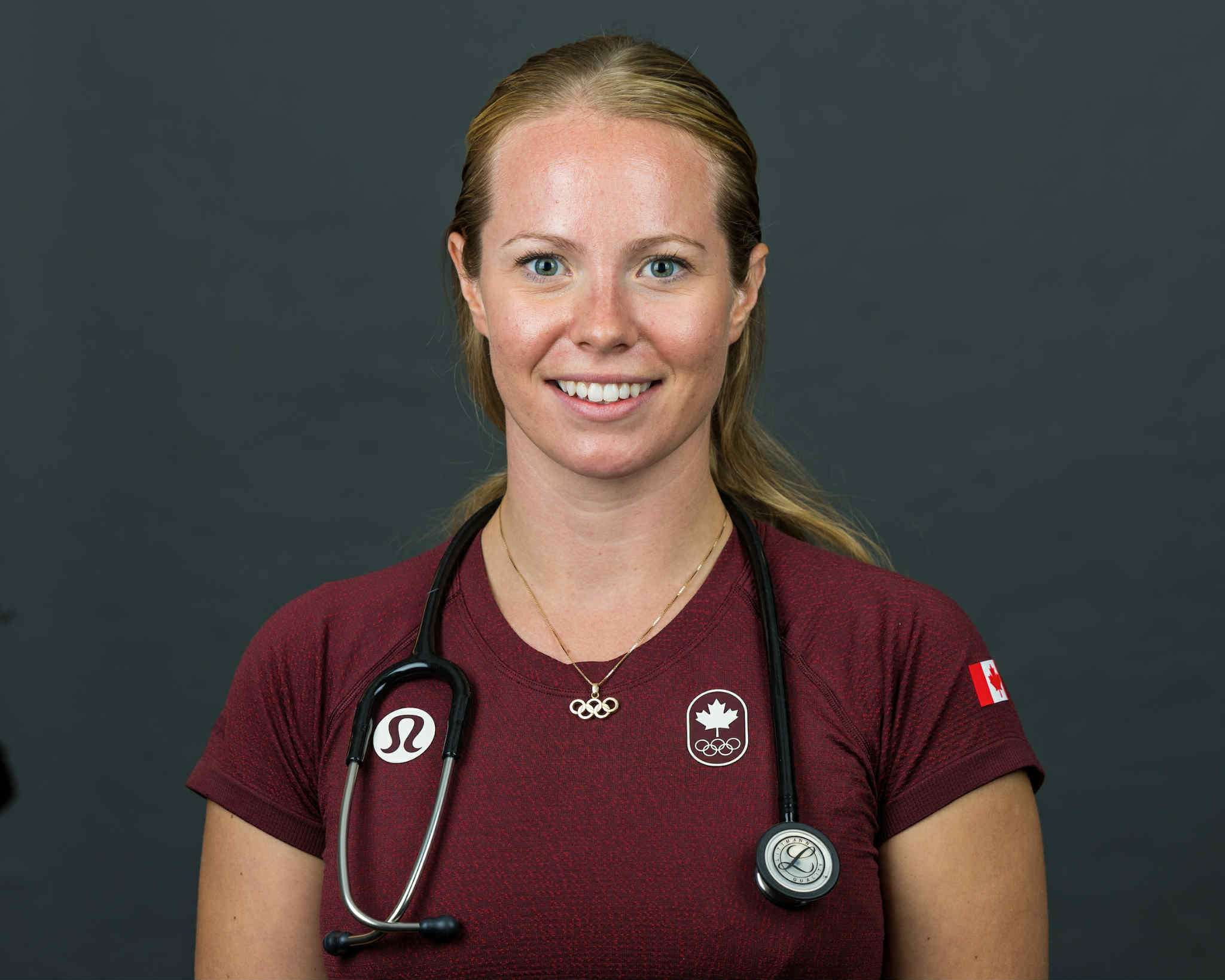

Personal information
- Nickname: Jackie
- Born: September 29, 1996 (age 29) Montreal, Quebec, Canada
- Height: 1.69 m (5 ft 7 in)
- Weight: 53.5 kg (118 lb)

Sport
- Sport: Swimming
- Strokes: Synchronized swimming
- Club: Canada Artistic Swimming
Medal record
Representing Canada
Artistic swimming
World Championships
Gold medal – first place	2024 Doha	Solo free routine
Silver medal – second place	2024 Doha	Solo technical routine
Pan American Games
Gold medal – first place	2015 Toronto	Duet
Gold medal – first place	2015 Toronto	Team
Gold medal – first place	2019 Lima	Duet
Gold medal – first place	2019 Lima	Team
World Junior Championships
Silver medal – second place	2014 Helsinki	Solo
Bronze medal – third place	2012 Volos	Solo

Jacqueline Simoneau (born September 29, 1996) is a Canadian artistic swimmer, Olympian, and sport leader. She has represented Canada at three Olympic Games and has won over 80 international medals. Beyond sport, she is recognized for her leadership in athlete governance, her volunteer and philanthropic work, and her academic achievements in health sciences and podiatric medicine.

== Career ==
Simoneau is a three-time Olympian (2016 Rio de Janeiro, 2020 Tokyo, 2024 Paris). She is a World Champion and an 86-time World medalist. At the continental level, she is a four-time Pan American Games champion, establishing herself as one of Canada’s most successful athletes in the discipline.

== Olympian timeline ==
Simoneau won two gold medals at the 2015 Pan American Games and qualified for the 2016 Olympic Games. On May 18, 2016, Simoneau was named to Canada's 2016 Olympics team in the duet event. In Rio, Simoneau and her teammate Karine Thomas finished seventh. In July 2019, Canada's Olympic team – led by Simoneau – competed in Gwangju, Korea, where their team finished 7th in both Free and Technical team, and 4th in the Highlight routine; Simoneau and Claudia Holzner's Technical duet placed 7th and their Free 6th; Simoneau's Technical and Free solos placed 5th. These results led to the qualification of Simoneau and Holzner's Women's Technical Duet, and the Canadian Women's Free and Technical Teams to the Tokyo 2020 Olympics.

== Education ==
Simoneau was valedictorian, and graduated from the Health Sciences program at Vanier College in Montreal. She is currently completing her Doctorate in Podiatric Medicine at the Université du Québec à Trois-Rivières.

== Leadership and Activism ==
Simoneau holds several positions in athlete advocacy and sport governance. She is a member of the World Aquatics Athletes’ Committee and serves on the Canadian Olympic Committee Athletes’ Commission, ensuring athletes’ voices are represented in decision-making at both national and international levels.

She is also a Believe in Sport Ambassador with the International Olympic Committee, promoting integrity, fair play, and ethical leadership in sport.

Simoneau founded Aqua Unity, an international initiative aimed at fostering inclusivity, promoting adaptive opportunities in artistic swimming, and supporting marginalized communities around the world.

== Philanthropy and Volunteering ==
Simoneau is an ambassador for the Girls Forward Foundation, supporting the empowerment of girls and young women through sport and education.

She is an ambassador for the Course de la Compassion Palliative Care Walk, an initiative raising awareness and funds for palliative care services.
