= Nehal Saafan =

Egyptian synchronized swimmer

Personal information
- Full name: Nehal Nabil Muhammad Al-Sayid Saafan
- Born: 10 September 1996 (age 29) Cairo, Egypt

Sport
- Country: Egypt
- Sport: Synchronized swimming

Nehal Nabil Muhammad Al-Sayid Saafan (Arabic: نهال نبيل محمد السيد سعفان, born 10 September 1996) is an Egyptian synchronized swimmer. She competed in the women's team event at the 2016 Summer Olympics. and the 2020 Summer Olympics.
