= Farida Radwan =

Egyptian synchronized swimmer

Personal information
- Nationality: Egypt
- Born: 4 August 2000 (age 25)

Sport
- Sport: Synchronized swimming
- Event: Women's team

Farida Radwan (born 4 August 2000) is an Egyptian synchronized swimmer. She competed in the 2020 Summer Olympics.
