= Laila Mohsen =

Egyptian synchronized swimmer

Personal information
- Full name: Laila Ali Mohsen
- Nationality: Egypt
- Born: 22 August 2000 (age 24)

Sport
- Sport: Synchronized swimming
- Event(s): Women's duet Women's team

Laila Ali Mohsen (born 22 August 2000) is an Egyptian synchronized swimmer. She competed in the 2020 Summer Olympics.
