= Maha Amer =

Egyptian diver (born 1999)

Personal information
- Full name: Maha Khalid 'Issa Amer
- Nationality: Egyptian
- Born: 27 March 1999 (age 27) Cairo, Egypt
- Height: 163 cm (5 ft 4 in)

Sport
- Country: Egypt
- Sport: Diving
- College team: University of Arkansas (2017–19), University of Florida (2019–)
Medal record
Representing Egypt
Women's diving
World Championships
Bronze medal – third place	2024 Doha	1 m springboard

Maha Khalid 'Issa Amer (born 27 March 1999) is an Egyptian diver. She competed in the women's three metre springboard event at the 2016 Summer Olympics, and competed in the same event at the 2024 Summer Olympics.

She has also competed at six World Aquatics Championships, winning the bronze medal in the 1 metre springboard event at the World Championships in 2024 edition.

== Diving achievements ==
Competition	Event	2016	2017	2018	2019	2020	2021	2022	2023	2024
International representing Egypt
Olympic Games	3m Springboard	28th					DNQ			Q
FINA World Aquatics Championships	1m Springboard				28th			26th	5th	3rd place, bronze medalist(s)
FINA World Aquatics Championships	3m Springboard		27th		42nd			18th	38th	26th
FINA World Aquatics Championships	3m Mixed Synchro				18th				9th	
FINA Diving World Cup	3m Springboard	25th					45th			
