= Egypt at the 2012 Summer Olympics =

- IOC code: EGY
- NOC: Egyptian Olympic Committee
- Website: www.egyptianolympic.org (in Arabic and English)

in London
- Competitors: 110 in 20 sports
- Flag bearers: Hesham Mesbah (opening); Tamer Bayoumi (closing)
- Medals Ranked 56th: Gold 0 Silver 3 Bronze 1 Total 4

Summer Olympics appearances (overview)
- 1912; 1920; 1924; 1928; 1932; 1936; 1948; 1952; 1956; 1960–1964; 1968; 1972; 1976; 1980; 1984; 1988; 1992; 1996; 2000; 2004; 2008; 2012; 2016; 2020; 2024; 2028

Other related appearances
- 1906 Intercalated Games –––– United Arab Republic (1960, 1964)

Egypt competed at the 2012 Summer Olympics in London, from 27 July to 12 August 2012, sending one of its largest delegations ever. A total of 110 Egyptian athletes participated in 83 events across 20 sports, with more women taking part than ever before. The nation's flagbearer in the opening ceremonies was Hesham Mesbah, a judoka who was Egypt's only medalist at the 2008 Summer Olympics. Egypt won two medals during the course of the Games: Alaaeldin Abouelkassem earned silver in the men's foil, becoming the first competitor from an African nation to win a fencing medal, while Karam Gaber captured silver in the men's 84 kg Greco-Roman wrestling event. Two Egyptian weightlifters were awarded medals retroactively, after higher-ranked competitors were disqualified for doping: Abeer Abdelrahman took silver in the women's 75 kg event, while Tarek Yehia received bronze in the men's 85 kg event. Among other achievements, Mostafa Mansour was the nation's first competitor in sprint canoeing while fencer Shaimaa El-Gammal became the first Egyptian female to appear in four editions of the Olympics.

Prior to 2012, Egypt had sent athletes to nineteen editions of the Summer Olympic Games, the 1906 Intercalated Games, equestrian at the 1956 Summer Olympics, and the 1984 Winter Olympics. Before the Games began, the Egyptian Olympic Committee distributed counterfeit Nike gear to its athletes, due to its financial troubles following the Egyptian Revolution of 2011. Nike, however, ended up donating legitimate equipment to the Egyptians. Tamer Bayoumi, a 2004 Olympic bronze medalist and the nation's most successful taekwondo practitioner at the 2012 Games, was chosen to carry Egypt's flag at the closing ceremony.

Aside from the team sport of football, which had 16 participants, fencing and wrestling were the sports in which Egypt had the most participants, sending 12 representatives to each. Of them, the wrestlers was almost exclusively male with only one female, Rabab Eid, taking part. The sport with the most Egyptian female participation was synchronized swimming, an all-woman tournament at the Olympics, with eight, while the nation sent six women to fencing, the highest number for a mixed sport. Among tournaments with the potential for both men and women to take part, Egypt qualified females, but not males, for badminton, and males, but not females, for track and field athletics, boxing, canoeing, equestrian, football, judo, and sailing.

== Medalists ==
The following Egyptian athletes won medals at the games. In the by discipline sections below, medalists' names are bolded.

Medal	Name	Sport	Event	Date
Silver	Alaaeldin Abouelkassem	Fencing	Men's foil	31 July
Silver	Abeer Abdelrahman	Weightlifting	Women's 75 kg	3 August
Silver	Karam Gaber	Wrestling	Men's Greco-Roman 84 kg	6 August
Bronze	Tarek Yehia	Weightlifting	Men's 85 kg	3 August

Medals by sport
**Sport**	1st place, gold medalist(s)	2nd place, silver medalist(s)	3rd place, bronze medalist(s)	**Total**
Fencing	0	1	0	1
Weightlifting	0	1	1	2
Wrestling	0	1	0	1
Total	0	3	1	4

== Background ==
Prior to 2012, Egypt had sent athletes to nineteen editions of the Summer Olympic Games (three times as the United Arab Republic), the 1906 Intercalated Games, equestrian at the 1956 Summer Olympics, and the 1984 Winter Olympics. (Note: Fifth Olympiad : the Official Report of the Olympic Games of Stockholm, 1912 (PDF). Swedish Olympic Committee. 1913. Archived from the original (PDF) on 7 February 2014. Lists Egypt as having sent a fencer to those Games, but there is uncertainty as to whether he actually competed.) With the exception of the Soviet-boycotted 1984 Summer Olympics, Egypt's 2012 delegation was the largest ever, and chose Hesham Mesbah, a 2008 Olympic medalist in judo, as its flagbearer in the opening ceremony. A total of 110 Egyptians, 76 men and 34 women, travelled to London and competed in 20 different sports. (Note: Sports Reference counts gymnastics and rhythmic gymnastics as distinct sports, and thus lists 21) It was the largest delegation of women in the country's Olympic history. Prior the start of the Olympic Games, the Egyptian Olympic Committee (EOC) distributed counterfeit Nike gear from a Chinese distributor to its athletes, due to its financial troubles following the Egyptian Revolution of 2011. Nike ended up donating equipment to the Egyptians, despite the EOC's eventual willingness to pay.

== Competitors ==
Shaimaa El-Gammal became the nation's first female to appear in four Olympic games, while former Olympic medalists Tamer Bayoumi (taekwondo), Karam Gaber (Greco-Roman wrestling), and Hesham Mesbah (judo) returned to compete again. Middleweight boxer Mohamed Hikal and skeet shooter Mostafa Hamdy also made a fourth appearance at the Games, while Gaber, Mesbah, and six other athletes made their third Olympic appearance: discus thrower Omar Ahmed El Ghazaly, modern pentathlete Aya Medany, table tennis player El-sayed Lashin, Greco-Roman wrestlers Ashraf El-Gharably and Mohamed Abdelfatah, and judoka Islam El Shehaby. Skeet shooter Mona El-Hawary, aged 49, was the oldest athlete on the team, while sprint freestyle swimmer Farida Osman was the youngest at age 17. Bayoumi was selected as Egypt's flagbearer for the closing ceremony.

The following table lists the number of Egyptian competitors who participated in each Olympic sport. Reserves in fencing, field hockey, football, and handball are not included, nor are athletes who failed to start in their event.

Sport	Men	Women	Total
Archery	1	1	2
Athletics	6	0	6
Badminton	0	1	1
Boxing	5	0	5
Canoeing	1	0	1
Equestrian	1	0	1
Fencing	6	6	12
Football	16	0	16
Gymnastics	1	3	4
Judo	5	0	5
Modern pentathlon	2	1	3
Rowing	3	2	5
Sailing	1	0	1
Shooting	5	2	7
Swimming	2	1	3
Synchronized swimming	0	8	8
Table tennis	3	3	6
Taekwondo	2	2	4
Weightlifting	5	3	8
Wrestling	11	1	12
Total	76	34	110

== Archery ==
Two Egyptian archers, one male and one female, qualified for the Olympics, both of whom had earned their berths at the 2012 African Archery Championships. Ahmed El-Nemr finished second at that tournament, behind Philippe Kouassi of Côte d'Ivoire, and entered the men's individual event. El-Nemr had won three medals at the 2011 Pan Arab Games, gold in the individual recurve 90 metres and silver in the individual recurve FITA and the team event. In London he scored 644 points in the ranking round and placed 57th overall out of 64 competitors. In the round of 64 he defeated eighth-ranked Crispin Duenas of Canada three sets to one and then faced Kuo Cheng-wei, who was representing Chinese Taipei. El-Nemr lost this round three sets to one and was eliminated from the tournament, leaving with a final ranking of 17th. Nada Kamel, who had earned seven medals at the 2011 Pan Arab Games, won the women's event at the 2012 African Championships and entered the individual tournament. There she scored 611 points in the ranking round and placed 56th overall out of 64 participants. She was defeated by Ksenia Perova of Russia three sets to none in the opening round and finished the event joint-33rd and last.

Athlete	Event	Ranking round		Round of 64	Round of 32	Round of 16	Quarterfinals	Semifinals	Final / BM	
Athlete	Event	Score	Seed	Opposition Score	Opposition Score	Opposition Score	Opposition Score	Opposition Score	Opposition Score	Rank
Ahmed El-Nemr	Men's individual	644	57	Duenas (CAN) (8); **W** 6–2	Kuo C-w (TPE) (40); **L** 2–6	Did not advance				
Nada Kamel	Women's individual	611	56	Perova (RUS) (9); **L** 0–6	Did not advance					

Key: W = Competitor won the match; L = Competitor lost the match; BM = Bronze medal match

== Athletics ==
Seven Egyptian athletes, six men and one woman, qualified for the Olympics, although one did not compete. Noura Elsayed, the lone woman, was slated to run in the 800 metres, but withdrew due to injury. The only Egyptian to participate in more than one event was Amr Ibrahim Mostafa Seoud, a veteran of the 200 metre event at the 2008 Summer Olympics. Seoud, who had won gold medals in the 100 metres at the 2007 Pan Arab and 2011 All-African Games, and the 200 metres at the 2007 Pan Arab and 2009 Mediterranean Games, as well as the 2010 African Championships, met the "A" qualifying standard for both the 100 metres and 200 metres. In the 100 m, he drew the same heat as world record-holder and defending Olympic champion Usain Bolt of Jamaica and finished fourth, which was insufficient to advance. He had the same standing in the opening heats of the 200 m. Hamada Mohamed met the "A" qualifying standard for the 800 metres and won his opening heat in London, advancing to the semifinals. He was placed in the same heat as David Rudisha of Kenya, the world-record holder and upcoming gold medalist, and finished eighth out of nine competitors, failing to reach the final.

The remaining Egyptians, all of whom qualified through the B standard, competed in field events. Omar Ahmed El Ghazaly, in the discus, was the most experienced of the quartet, with senior international medals going back to bronze at the 2002 African Championships in Athletics, in addition to past Olympic appearances in 2004 and 2008. In London he finished 26th among 41 participants with a best throw of 60.26 meters. Ihab Abdelrahman, in the javelin throw, had missed the 2008 Summer Olympics, despite having been a silver medalist at the 2007 Pan Arab Games, but had won the event at the 2010 African Championships and the 2011 Pan Arab Games. In London he placed 28th out of 44 competitors with a best throw of 77.35 meters. Mostafa Al-Gamel, in the hammer throw, was the gold medalist from the 2011 All-African Games and a silver medalist from the 2008 African Championships and the 2011 Pan Arab Games. In London he was 27th among 41 participants with a best throw of 71.36 meters. Mohamed Fathalla Difallah, who had come in fourth at the 2011 All-Africa Games, was 37th out of 41 competitors in the qualifying round of the long jump in London, with a distance of 7.08 meters, and did not advance to the final.

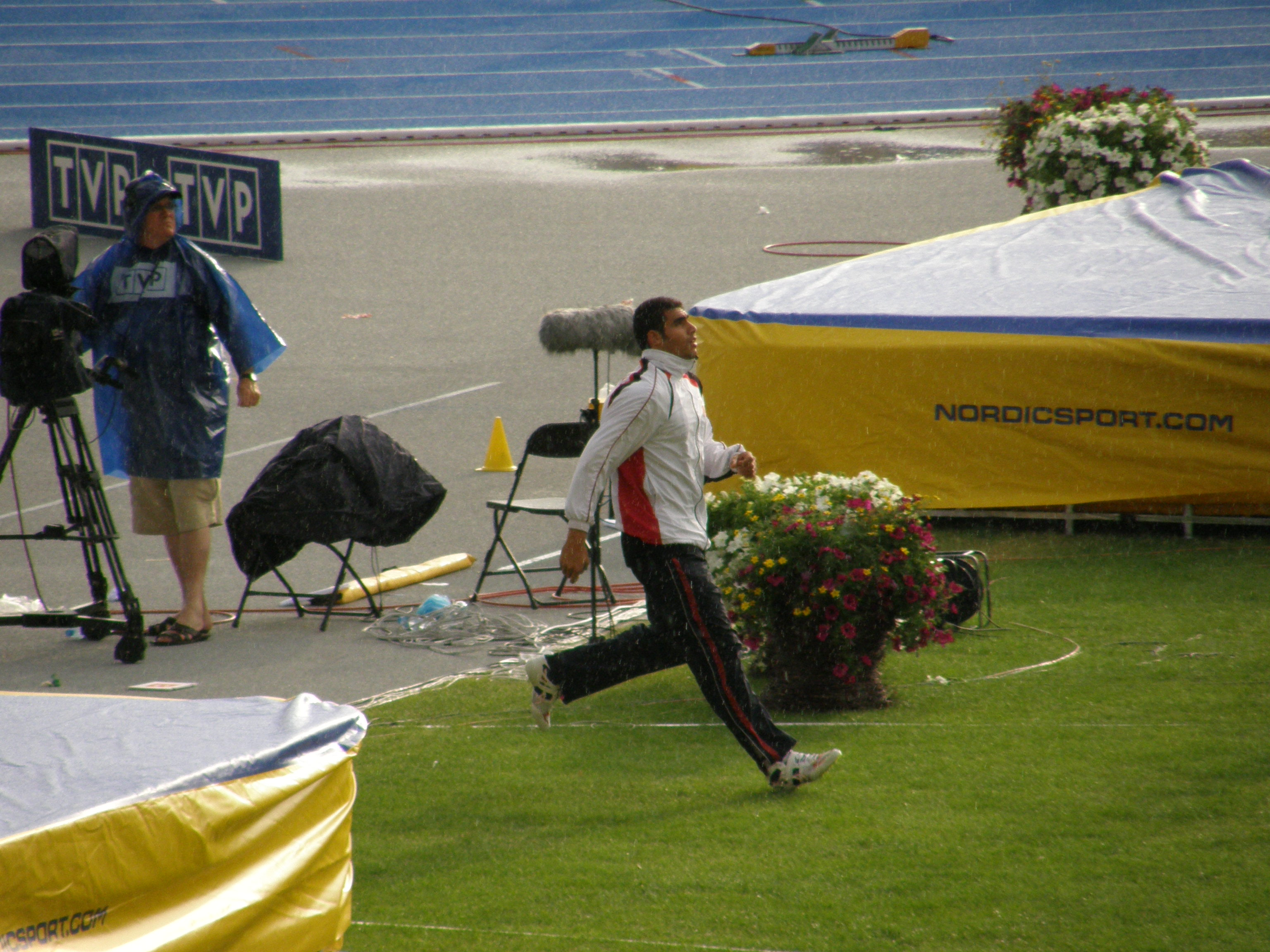
Ihab Abdelrahman, pictured at the 2008 World Junior Championships in Athletics, competed in the javelin throw, achieved a best distance of 77.35 meters, and placed 28th.

Men
Track & road events

Athlete	Event	Heat		Quarterfinal		Semifinal		Final	
Athlete	Event	Result	Rank	Result	Rank	Result	Rank	Result	Rank
Hamada Mohamed	800 m	1:48.05	1 **Q**	—N/a		1:48.18	8	Did not advance	
Amr Ibrahim Mostafa Seoud	100 m	Bye		10.22	4	Did not advance			
Amr Ibrahim Mostafa Seoud	200 m	20.81	4	—N/a		Did not advance			

Field events

Athlete	Event	Qualification		Final	
Athlete	Event	Distance	Position	Distance	Position
Omar Ahmed El Ghazaly	Discus throw	60.26	26	Did not advance	
Ihab Abdelrahman	Javelin throw	77.35	28	Did not advance	
Mohamed Fathalla Difallah	Long jump	7.08	37	Did not advance	
Mostafa Al-Gamel	Hammer throw	71.36	27	Did not advance	

Women
Track & road events

Athlete	Event	Heat		Semifinal		Final	
Athlete	Event	Result	Rank	Result	Rank	Result	Rank
Noura Elsayed	800 m	DNS		Did not advance			

Note – Ranks given for track events are within the athlete's heat only
Key: Q = Qualified for the next round; N/A = Round not applicable for the event; DNS = Athlete failed to start the event

== Badminton ==
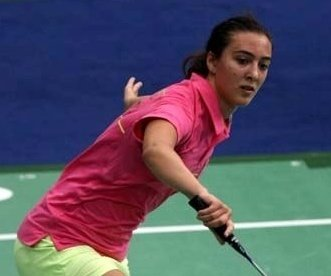
Hadia Hosny was Egypt's sole representative in badminton at the 2012 Summer Olympics.

One Egyptian badminton player qualified for the Olympics, Hadia Hosny. A veteran of the 2008 Summer Games, she trained for London at the University of Bath, where she was a graduate student in bioscience. Ranked 102nd in the world, she qualified by being the top player on the African continent. In the women's singles, she lost to Pi Hongyan of France and Chloe Magee of Ireland, finished in the bottom of her group, and was eliminated from the tournament.

Athlete	Event	Group stage			Elimination	Quarterfinal	Semifinal	Final / BM	
Athlete	Event	Opposition Score	Opposition Score	Rank	Opposition Score	Opposition Score	Opposition Score	Opposition Score	Rank
Hadia Hosny	Women's singles	Pi (FRA); **L** 11–21, 9–21	Magee (IRL); **L** 17–21, 6–21	3	Did not advance				

Key: L = Competitor lost the match; BM = Bronze medal match

== Boxing ==
Five Egyptian boxers qualified for the Olympics, all of whom were men and earned their spots at the 2012 African Boxing Olympic Qualification Tournament. The only Egyptian to win a bout in London was Hesham Yehia, in the flyweight division, who defeated Benson Gicharu of Kenya before losing to Jasurbek Latipov of Uzbekistan in the round of 16. Yehia's most successful major international tournament had been the 2011 Pan Arab Games, where he had been the flyweight runner-up. The most experienced boxer was Mohamed Hikal, who had competed in the light-middleweight, welterweight, and middleweight categories of the 2000, 2004, and 2008 Summer Olympics respectively. Among his international boxing distinctions, he was 1999 and 2003 All-African champion, 2005 Mediterranean champion, 2007 and 2011 Pan Arab champion, and 2007 African champion, and won a bronze medal at the 2005 World Championships. In 2012 he was once again representing Egypt as a middleweight and lost his first bout to Soltan Migitinov of Azerbaijan. Ramy Helmy El-Awadi, a bronze medalist from the 2007 Pan Arab Games, received a bye in the opening round of the light flyweight class and was defeated by Ferhat Pehlivan of Turkey in the round of 16. Mohamed Ramadan and Eslam El-Gendy lost their first bouts to eventual silver medalist Han Soon-Chul of South Korea and Gyula Káté of Hungary in the lightweight and light welterweight events respectively.

Men

Athlete	Event	Round of 32	Round of 16	Quarterfinals	Semifinals	Final	
Athlete	Event	Opposition Result	Opposition Result	Opposition Result	Opposition Result	Opposition Result	Rank
Ramy Helmy El-Awadi	Light flyweight	Bye	Pehlivan (TUR); **L** 6–20	Did not advance			
Hesham Yehia	Flyweight	Gicharu (KEN); **W** 19–16	Latipov (UZB); **L** 11–21	Did not advance			
Mohamed Ramadan	Lightweight	Han S-C (KOR); **L** 6–11	Did not advance				
Eslam El-Gendy	Light welterweight	Káté (HUN); **L** 10–16	Did not advance				
Mohamed Hikal	Middleweight	Migitinov (AZE); **L** 12–20	Did not advance				

Key: W = Competitor won the match; L = Competitor lost the match; Bye = Athlete not required to compete in round

== Canoeing ==
Egypt's first ever Olympic competitor in canoe and kayak, Mostafa Mansour, qualified for the 2012 Games. Having taken up the sport in 2007, after abandoning his initial pursuit of rowing, Mansour qualified for the K-1 200 metres by coming in third in the event at the 2011 All-Africa Games. The Olympic spots were originally meant to go to the top two finishers, Greg Louw of South Africa and Mohamed Mrabet of Tunisia, but South Africa did not select Louw for the Games. Mansour's best time in the K-1 1000 metres earned him a spot in that event as a continental wildcard. He was eliminated in the opening round of both events in London, after finishing last in his heats.

=== Sprint ===
Athlete	Event	Heats		Semifinals		Finals	
Athlete	Event	Time	Rank	Time	Rank	Time	Rank
Mostafa Mansour	Men's K-1 200 m	40.507	7	Did not advance			
Mostafa Mansour	Men's K-1 1000 m	4:09.651	7	Did not advance			

== Equestrian ==
One Egyptian equestrian qualified for show jumping for the Olympics. Karim El-Zoghby, a veteran of the 2008 Games, qualified with his horse Wervel Wind due to his ranking at the 2010 FEI World Equestrian Games. In the months leading up to the Olympics, he trained full-time in the Netherlands and won a silver medal in the team jumping event at the 2011 Pan Arab Games. In London, Zoghby survived the first qualifying course by finishing joint-53rd with five penalties, but was eliminated after placing 51st in round two with an additional five penalties.

=== Show jumping ===
Athlete	Horse	Event	Qualification								Final					Total	
Athlete	Horse	Event	Round 1		Round 2			Round 3			Round A		Round B			Total	
Athlete	Horse	Event	Penalties	Rank	Penalties	Total	Rank	Penalties	Total	Rank	Penalties	Rank	Penalties	Total	Rank	Penalties	Rank
Karim El-Zoghby	Wervel Wind	Individual	5	53 **Q**	5	10	51	Did not advance								10	51

Key: Q = Qualified for the next round

== Fencing ==
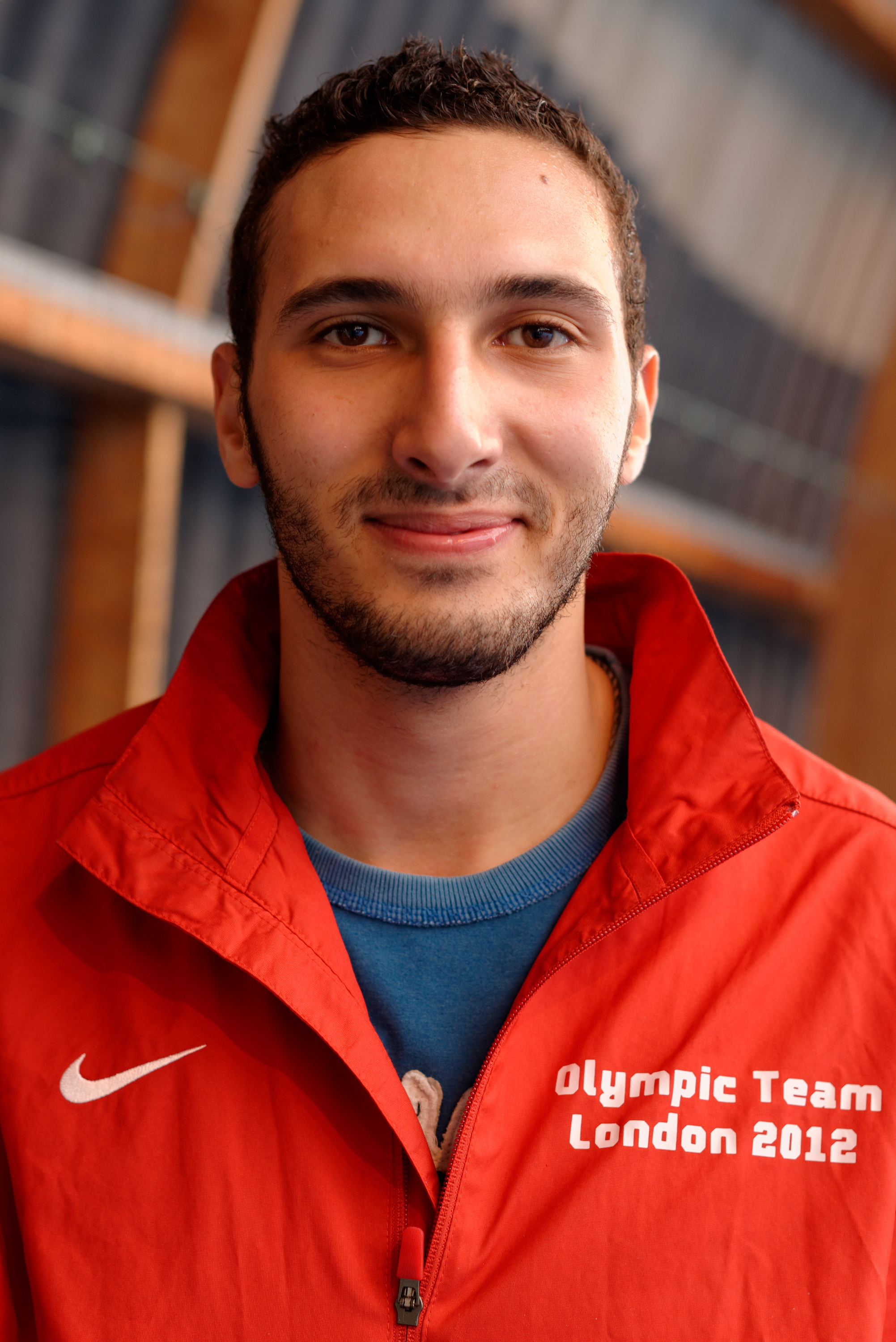
Alaaeldin Abouelkassem was the runner-up in the men's foil, making him the first African fencer to win an Olympic medal.

Twelve Egyptian fencers, six men and six women, qualified for the Olympics. Both the men and women qualified their foil teams by being the top African nation in this category, while Ayman Mohamed Fayez and Salma Mahran were selected as the second highest-ranked Africans in the men's épée and the women's sabre respectively. The final competitors, Mona Hassanein in the women's épée and Mannad Zeid in the men's sabre, won an African qualifier to earn their spots. Both foil teams lost their opening rounds against Great Britain and were eliminated from the tournament.

In the men's events, Alaaeldin Abouelkassem, who captured gold in the individual and team foil events at the 2011 Pan Arab Games, won a silver medal in the men's foil, after the losing the final against Lei Sheng of China. To qualify for the final he defeated American Miles Chamley-Watson, Germany's Peter Joppich, Italy's Andrea Cassarà, and South Korea's Choi Byung-Chul, and became the first African to win an Olympic fencing medal. One of his teammates, Tarek Ayad, who had also been part of the gold medal-winning foil team at the 2011 Pan Arab Games and had won bronze individually, defeated fellow Egyptian Anas Mostafa in the opening round, before losing to Aleksey Cheremisinov of Russia in the round of 32. Fayez, who won gold in the individual and team épée events at the 2011 Pan Arab Games, and Zeid were defeated in their opening rounds by eventual gold medalist Rubén Limardo of Venezuela and Malaysia's Yu Peng Kean respectively. None of the women won any bouts in London, but Shaimaa El-Gammal became the first Egyptian female to compete in four Olympics, having taken part in the 2000, 2004, and 2008 editions.

Men

Athlete	Event	Round of 64	Round of 32	Round of 16	Quarterfinal	Semifinal	Final / BM	
Athlete	Event	Opposition Score	Opposition Score	Opposition Score	Opposition Score	Opposition Score	Opposition Score	Rank
Ayman Mohamed Fayez	Individual épée	—N/a	Limardo (VEN); **L** 13–15	Did not advance				
**Alaaeldin Abouelkassem**	Individual foil	Bye	Chamley-Watson (USA); **W** 15–10	Joppich (GER); **W** 15–10	Cassarà (ITA); **W** 15–10	Choi B-C (KOR); **W** 15–12	Lei S (CHN); **L** 13–15	2nd place, silver medalist(s)
Tarek Ayad	Individual foil	Mostafa (EGY); **W** 15–5	Cheremisinov (RUS); **L** 8–15	Did not advance				
Anas Mostafa	Individual foil	Ayad (EGY); **L** 5–15	Did not advance					
Alaaeldin Abouelkassem; Tarek Ayad; Sherif Farrag; Anas Mostafa	Team foil	—N/a		Great Britain; **L** 33–45	Did not advance			
Mannad Zeid	Individual sabre	Yu P K (MAS); **L** 12–15	Did not advance					

Women

Athlete	Event	Round of 64	Round of 32	Round of 16	Quarterfinal	Semifinal	Final / BM	
Athlete	Event	Opposition Score	Opposition Score	Opposition Score	Opposition Score	Opposition Score	Opposition Score	Rank
Mona Hassanein	Individual épée	Hsu J-T (TPE); **L** 10–15	Did not advance					
Eman El Gammal	Individual foil	Fuenmayor (VEN); **L** 9–15	Did not advance					
Shaimaa El-Gammal	Individual foil	Shaito (LIB); **L** 6–7	Did not advance					
Eman Gaber	Individual foil	Bye	Guyart (FRA); **L** 2–15	Did not advance				
Eman El Gammal; Shaimaa El-Gammal; Eman Gaber; Rana El-Husseiny	Team foil	—N/a		Great Britain; **L** 34–45	Did not advance			
Salma Mahran	Individual sabre	—N/a	Wozniak (USA); **L** 6–15	Did not advance				

Key: W = Competitor won the match; L = Competitor lost the match; BM = Bronze medal match; N/A = Round not applicable for the event; Bye = Athlete not required to compete in round

== Football ==
=== Men's tournament ===
The Egyptian national football team qualified for the Olympics after its third-place finish at the 2011 CAF U-23 Championship. It was the nation's first Olympic appearance since the 1992 Games and they chose Mohamed Aboutrika, Ahmed Fathy, and Emad Moteab as their three over-23 players. The squad was coached by Hany Ramzy. In the tournament, Egypt was drawn into Group C. It lost its first match against Brazil 3–2, but tied New Zealand 1–1 and defeated Belarus 3–1 to advance to the knockout stage. This was their fifth time in eleven tournaments that Egypt progressed out of the group stage. Egypt met Japan in the quarterfinals and lost 3–0, eliminating them from the tournament.

Team roster

The following is the Egypt squad in the men's football tournament of the 2012 Summer Olympics.

Coach: Hany Ramzy

No.	Pos.	Player	Date of birth (age)	Caps	Goals	2012 club
1	GK	Ahmed El Shenawy	14 May 1991 (aged 21)	7	0	(Egyptian Football Association) Zamalek
2	DF	Mahmoud Alaa El-Din	1 January 1991 (aged 21)	1	0	(Egyptian Football Association) Haras El-Hodood
3	DF	Ali Fathy	2 January 1992 (aged 20)	9	0	(Egyptian Football Association) Arab Contractors
4	DF	Omar Gaber	30 January 1992 (aged 20)	2	0	(Egyptian Football Association) Zamalek
5	MF	Mohamed Aboutrika* (c)	7 November 1978 (aged 33)	88	32	(Egyptian Football Association) Al Ahly
6	DF	Ahmed Hegazi	25 January 1991 (aged 21)	12	0	(Italian Football Federation) Fiorentina
7	DF	Ahmed Fathy*	10 November 1984 (aged 27)	86	3	(Egyptian Football Association) Al Ahly
8	MF	Shehab El-Din Ahmed	22 August 1990 (aged 21)	0	0	(Egyptian Football Association) Al Ahly
9	FW	Marwan Mohsen	26 February 1989 (aged 23)	4	3	(Egyptian Football Association) Petrojet
10	FW	Emad Motaeb*	20 February 1983 (aged 29)	67	26	(Egyptian Football Association) Al Ahly
11	FW	Mohamed Salah	15 June 1992 (aged 20)	14	8	(Swiss Football Association) Basel
12	DF	Islam Ramadan	1 November 1990 (aged 21)	4	0	(Egyptian Football Association) Haras El-Hodood
13	MF	Saleh Gomaa	1 August 1993 (aged 18)	2	0	(Egyptian Football Association) ENPPI
14	MF	Hossam Hassan	30 April 1989 (aged 23)	1	0	(Egyptian Football Association) Al-Masry
15	DF	Saad Samir	1 April 1989 (aged 23)	0	0	(Egyptian Football Association) Al Ahly
16	FW	Ahmed Magdi	9 December 1989 (aged 22)	2	0	(Egyptian Football Association) Ghazl El Mehalla
17	MF	Mohamed Elneny	11 July 1992 (aged 20)	14	0	(Egyptian Football Association) Arab Contractors
18	GK	Mohamed Bassam	25 December 1990 (aged 21)	2	0	(Egyptian Football Association) El-Gaish

*Indicates that player was born prior to 1 January 1989. According to FIFA regulations, only three such players are permitted on an Olympic squad.

Group play

Pos	Team	Pld	W	D	L	GF	GA	GD	Pts	Qualification
1	Brazil	3	3	0	0	9	3	+6	**9**	Advance to knockout stage
2	Egypt	3	1	1	1	6	5	+1	**4**	Advance to knockout stage
3	Belarus	3	1	0	2	3	6	−3	**3**	
4	New Zealand	3	0	1	2	1	5	−4	**1**	

Source: FIFA
Rules for classification: Group stage tiebreakers
26 July 2012
19:45

Brazil	3–2	Egypt
Rafael 16'; Damião 26'; Neymar 30'	Report	Aboutrika 52'; Salah 76'

Millennium Stadium, Cardiff
Attendance: 26,812
Referee: Gianluca Rocchi (Italy)

29 July 2012
12:00

Egypt	1–1	New Zealand
Salah 40'	Report	Wood 17'

Old Trafford, Manchester
Attendance: 50,050
Referee: Mark Clattenburg (Great Britain)

1 August 2012
14:30

Egypt	3–1	Belarus
Salah 56'; Mohsen 73'; Aboutrika 79'	Report	Varankow 87'

Hampden Park, Glasgow
Attendance: 8,732
Referee: Roberto García (Mexico)

Quarterfinal

4 August 2012
12:00

Japan	3–0	Egypt
Nagai 14'; Yoshida 78'; Ōtsu 83'	Report

Old Trafford, Manchester
Attendance: 70,772
Referee: Mark Geiger (United States)

== Gymnastics ==
Four Egyptian gymnasts, three artistic and one rhythmic, qualified for the Olympics. Mohamed El-Saharty, the lone male, was invited to London as the highest-ranked African in the individual all-around at the 2011 World Artistic Gymnastics Championships. He was individual all-around Arab Champion in 2011 and 2012, African Champion in 2010 and 2012, and Pan Arab Champion in 2011. At the latter tournament, he had also taken gold in the horizontal bar, the pommel horse, the vault, and the team event. In London his best event was the vault, where he finished 12th. He was 52nd in the horizontal bar, 56th in the floor, 57th in the pommel horse, 61st in the rings, and 65th in the parallel bars. His final rank in the individual all-around was 37th.

Salma El-Said and Sherine El-Zeiny qualified for the Olympics as the second and third-ranked Africans at the 2011 World Championships, with El-Zeiny having been offered a spot after the highest-placed African, Nicole Szabo of South Africa, turned down the invitation due to injury. El-Said had taken a break from active competition while recovering from an injury of her own and came back shortly before the World Championships. Since then she had taken the individual all-around title at the 2011 Arab Games and the 2012 African Championships. El-Zeiny was a veteran of the 2008 tournament and both had been a part of Egypt's victorious all-around team at the 2012 African Championships. In London, El-Said's best event was the balance beam, in which she placed 42nd. She was also 63rd in the uneven bars, 69th in the floor exercise, and was ranked 41st overall in the individual all-around. El-Zeiny was 53rd on the balance beam, but finished 82nd and last in the floor exercise after suffering an injury. Yasmine Rostom, the rhythmic gymnast, qualified by being the top performer from Africa at the 2011 World Rhythmic Gymnastics Championships. In London she was 23rd in the ball and the hoop, 20th in the clubs, and last in the ribbon to finish 23rd out of 24 competitors overall.

=== Artistic ===
Men

Athlete	Event	Qualification								Final							
Athlete	Event	Apparatus						Total	Rank	Apparatus						Total	Rank
Athlete	Event	F	PH	R	V	PB	HB	Total	Rank	F	PH	R	V	PB	HB	Total	Rank
Mohamed El-Saharty	All-around	13.900	12.600	13.566	15.466	13.400	13.666	82.598	37	Did not advance							

F = Floor exercise; PH = Pommel horse; R = Rings; V = Vault; PB = Parallel bars; HB = Horizontal bar; N/A = Round not applicable for the event

Women

Athlete	Event	Qualification						Final					
Athlete	Event	Apparatus				Total	Rank	Apparatus				Total	Rank
Athlete	Event	F	V	UB	BB	Total	Rank	F	V	UB	BB	Total	Rank
Salma El-Said	All-around	12.500	13.533	12.566	13.066	51.665	41	Did not advance					
Sherine El-Zeiny	Floor	11.000	—N/a			11.000	82	Did not advance					
Sherine El-Zeiny	Balance Beam	—N/a			12.733	12.733	53	Did not advance					

F = Floor exercise; PH = Pommel horse; UB = Uneven bars; BB = Balance beam; N/A = Round not applicable for the event

=== Rhythmic ===
Athlete	Event	Qualification						Final					
Athlete	Event	Hoop	Ball	Clubs	Ribbon	Total	Rank	Hoop	Ball	Clubs	Ribbon	Total	Rank
Yasmine Rostom	Individual	23.925	23.775	25.050	23.500	96.250	23	Did not advance					

== Judo ==
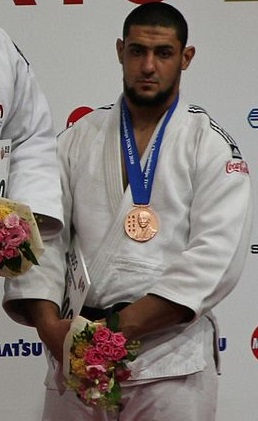
Islam El Shehaby, pictured at the 2010 World Judo Championships, entered the 2012 Summer Olympics as the fourth-ranked +100 kg judoka in the world.

Five Egyptian judoka qualified for the Olympics, all men, two of which advanced beyond the round of 32. Ahmed Awad, who was the 2011 African and All-Africa Games champion, as well as the runner-up at the 2009 Mediterranean Games and a bronze medalist at the 2012 African Championships, earned a spot in the 66 kg event by being the highest ranked African in the division. He defeated Humaid Al-Derei of the United Arab Emirates before losing against Tarlan Karimov of Azerbaijan in the round of 16. Hussein Hafiz, who was the 2011 Pan Arab and 2012 African Champion, as well as the 2011 African runner-up and a bronze medalist at the 2009 and 2010 editions and the 2011 All-Africa Games, qualified for London by being ranked 18th in the world in the 73 kg class. He won his opening match against Osman Murillo Segura of Costa Rica before being defeated by France's Ugo Legrand, an eventual bronze medalist. Hesham Mesbah, who was Egypt's only medalist at the 2008 Summer Olympics, returned to the 90 kg division by being ranked 13th in the world, but was eliminated his first match, against Timur Bolat of Kazakhstan.

Islam El Shehaby had participated in the 2004 and 2008 Summer Olympics and had international judo titles in the +100 kg division as far back as the 1999 Pan Arab Games. He was most recently African Champion in the +100 kg and open classes at the 2011 African Championships, and was runner-up in the former category at the 2012 edition. Coming into the 2012 Olympics he was ranked fourth in the world, but lost in the opening round against Ihar Makarau of Belarus. The final judoka, Ramadan Darwish, had won every African championship in the 100 kg class since 2009, was the 2009 Mediterranean champion and 2011 All-Africa Games runner-up, and had earned a bronze medal at the 2009 World Judo Championships. He qualified for the 100 kg event at the Olympic Games by being ranked ninth worldwide, but was defeated in his first match by France's Thierry Fabre.

Athlete	Event	Round of 64	Round of 32	Round of 16	Quarterfinals	Semifinals	Repechage	Final / BM	
Athlete	Event	Opposition Result	Opposition Result	Opposition Result	Opposition Result	Opposition Result	Opposition Result	Opposition Result	Rank
Ahmed Awad	Men's −66 kg	Bye	Al-Derei (UAE); **W** 0101–0001	Karimov (AZE); **L** 0000–0002	Did not advance				
Hussein Hafiz	Men's −73 kg	Bye	Murillo (CRC); **W** 0020–0003	Legrand (FRA); **L** 0104–0100	Did not advance				
Hesham Mesbah	Men's −90 kg	—N/a	Bolat (KAZ); **L** 0011–1002	Did not advance					
Ramadan Darwish	Men's −100 kg	—N/a	Fabre (FRA); **L** 0002–0011	Did not advance					
Islam El Shehaby	Men's +100 kg	—N/a	Makarau (BLR); **L** 0002–0021	Did not advance					

Key: W = Competitor won the match; L = Competitor lost the match; N/A = Round not applicable for the event; Bye = Athlete not required to compete in round

== Modern pentathlon ==
Three Egyptian athletes qualified for the Olympic modern pentathlon tournament, two men and one woman. Aya Medany, a veteran of the 2004 and 2008 Games, was the most experienced of the three, having competed internationally since 1999 at the age of 10. She won the 2011 African Championships to earn her spot in London, which was her fifth title at the tournament since 2004. In the women's event in London, she won 20 of her fencing bouts and was ranked joint-eighth after the first round. She was 18th in swimming, 19th in riding, and 21st in the combined running/shooting portion to finish 16th overall. On the men's side, Yasser Hefny won the 2011 African Championships and entered the men's event in London, where he won 17 of his fencing bouts and was ranked joint-thirteenth after the first round. He was 19th in the swimming, 28th in riding, and 31st in the combined running/shooting competition to finish 28th overall.

Amro El Geziry was a veteran of the 2008 Games, having won the 2006 and 2007 African Championships, and was following his brother Emad, who had participated in the 2000 edition. He won a bronze medal with another brother, Omar, at the 2009 World Modern Pentathlon Championships and eventually qualified for the 2012 Olympics by virtue of his world ranking. He received a berth during the second round of Olympic allocations, when spots won by nations who qualified more than the maximum two athletes were redistributed. In London he was victorious in 18 of his fencing bouts and was ranked joint-11th after the first round, but then won the swimming event with an Olympic record time of 1:55.70. He placed 33rd and 34th in the riding and combined riding/shooting competition, however, and finished 33rd overall.

Athlete	Event	Fencing (épée one touch)			Swimming (200 m freestyle)			Riding (show jumping)			Combined: shooting/running (10 m air pistol)/(3000 m)			Total points	Final rank
Athlete	Event	Results	Rank	MP points	Time	Rank	MP points	Penalties	Rank	MP points	Time	Rank	MP points	Total points	Final rank
Amro El Geziry	Men's	18–17	=11	832	1:55.70	1	1412 **OR**	344	33	856	11:42.44	34	2192	5292	33
Yasser Hefny	Men's	17–18	=13	808	2:05.90	19	1292	120	28	1080	11:25.53	31	2260	5440	28
Aya Medany	Women's	20–15	=8	880	2:18.70	18	1136	76	19	1124	12:31.92	21	1996	5136	16

Key: MP Points = Points earned towards total score; WR = World record; OR = Olympic record; NR = National record

== Rowing ==
Five Egyptians in three events qualified for the Olympic rowing tournament, all of whom earned their places at the African Continental Qualification Regatta in November 2011. A member of the national team since 2007, Nour El Din Hassanein normally rowed in the double sculls and, with Moustafa Fathy, finished last in the "C" final and 15th overall in that event at the 2010 World Rowing Championships. In London, however, he competed in the men's single sculls and placed second in the "D" final and 20th overall. In the men's lightweight double sculls, Omar Emira and Mohamed Nofel, who were first in the "E" final and 25th overall at the 2011 World Rowing Championships, finished 20th overall and last. In the women's version, Sara Baraka and Fatma Rashed, the latter of whom replaced Baraka's regular partner Ingy Hassem El Din also finished last.

Men

Athlete	Event	Heats		Repechage		Quarterfinals		Semifinals		Final	
Athlete	Event	Time	Rank	Time	Rank	Time	Rank	Time	Rank	Time	Rank
Nour El Din Hassanein	Single sculls	7:06.17	3 **QF**	Bye		7:23.12	6 **SC/D**	7:44.53	4 **FD**	7:27.19	15
Omar Emira; Mohamed Nofel	Lightweight double sculls	6:59.57	5 **R**	6:57.06	6 **SC/D**	—N/a		7:19.29	4 **FD**	7:12.79	20

Women

Athlete	Event	Heats		Repechage		Semifinals		Final	
Athlete	Event	Time	Rank	Time	Rank	Time	Rank	Time	Rank
Sara Baraka; Fatma Rashed	Lightweight double sculls	7:45.23	6 **R**	7:54.01	6 **FC**	Bye		8:14.17	17

Key: FA = Qualified for final A (medal); FB = Qualified for final B (non-medal); FC = Qualified for final C (non-medal); FD = Qualified for final D (non-medal); FE = Qualified for final E (non-medal); FF = Qualified for final F (non-medal); SA/B = Qualified for semifinals A/B; SC/D = Qualified for semifinals C/D; SE/F = Qualified for semifinals E/F; QF = Qualified for quarterfinals; R = Qualified for repechage; WR = World record; OR = Olympic record; NR = National record;N/A = Round not applicable for the event; Bye = Athlete not required to compete in round

== Sailing ==
One Egyptian windsurfer qualified for the Olympics, Ahmed Habash, who took up the sport as a teenager, but quit prior to the 2008 Games due to a serious injury. He re-entered competition in 2012 and won the Egyptian National Championships. This qualified him for the World Championships, where he performed well enough to earn a spot on the national delegation to London. In the sailboard, Habash finished last overall, with 334 net points, and was eliminated prior to the medal round.

Men

Athlete	Event	Race											Net points	Final rank
Athlete	Event	1	2	3	4	5	6	7	8	9	10	M*	Net points	Final rank
Ahmed Habash	RS:X	38	38	36	37	34	38	38	38	~~DNF~~	37	EL	334	38

Key: M* = Medal race; EL = Eliminated – did not advance into the medal race; ~~X~~ = Points from this race were discarded as being the competitor's worst race

== Shooting ==
Egypt earned seven quota places for shooting events, five of which went to men and two of which were for women. Mona El-Hawary, competing in the women's skeet, was 17th and last in her event, but still ranked higher than any other Egyptian shooter. She was also a veteran of the 2008 Summer Olympics. The other woman, Nourhan Amer, was 41st of 56 competitors in the 10 metre air rifle. She had won three medals in team events at the 2011 Pan Arab Games. Egypt's best-ranked man was Mostafa Hamdy, a veteran of the 1996, 2000, and 2004 Olympic tournaments, who was 18th among 36 participants in the men's skeet. Azmy Mehelba, the 2011 Pan Arab runner up, also competed in the skeet, but was last. Ahmed Zaher, in the trap, was 22nd of 34 competitors, while Karim Wagih was 38th of 44 participants in the 10 metre air pistol. Amgad Hosen, a team gold medalist from the 2011 Pan Arab Games, finished 29th out of 47 competitors in the 10 metre air rifle.

Men

Athlete	Event	Qualification		Final	
Athlete	Event	Points	Rank	Points	Rank
Mostafa Hamdy	Skeet	117	18	Did not advance	
Amgad Hosen	10 m air rifle	591	29	Did not advance	
Azmy Mehelba	Skeet	108	36	Did not advance	
Karim Wagih	10 m air pistol	566	38	Did not advance	
Ahmed Zaher	Trap	117	22	Did not advance	

Women

Athlete	Event	Qualification		Final	
Athlete	Event	Points	Rank	Points	Rank
Nourhan Amer	10 m air rifle	391	41	Did not advance	
Mona El-Hawary	Skeet	51	17	Did not advance	

Key: WR = World record; OR = Olympic record; NR = National record

== Swimming ==
Three Egyptian swimmers, one female and two males, qualified for the Olympics. American-born Farida Osman, the woman, was the youngest member of the 2012 national delegation and qualified for the Games based on having made the Olympic Standard Time in the 50-metre freestyle. In the lead up to the Olympics, she won seven gold medals at the 2011 Pan Arab Games, as well as the 50-metre butterfly title at that year's All-Africa Games and World Junior Championships. In London she was sixth in her heat in the 50-metre freestyle and was eliminated from the tournament, ranking 42nd overall. On the men's side, Shehab Younis qualified for the 50-metre freestyle by meeting the Olympic Selection Time of 22.88 at an international meet in Eindhoven, Netherlands, with a result of 22.85. Prior to the Olympics he had won a bronze medal in the event at the 2011 Pan Arab Games. In London he was third in his heat and 34th overall, failing to advance to the semifinals. Mazen Metwaly, a Saudi-born Egyptian training and studying at Southern Illinois University Carbondale, made the team at an Olympic qualifier in Setúbal, Portugal in June 2012, the second of his two opportunities (his first having been the 2011 World Championships). At the Games, in the marathon 10 kilometre, he was 24th out of 25 competitors.

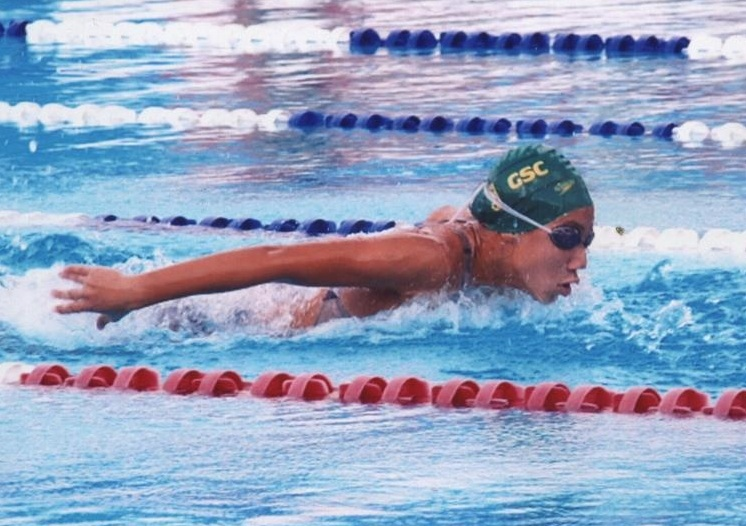
Farida Osman who competed in swimming's 50 metre freestyle, was the youngest member of Egypt's 2012 Olympic delegation.

Men

Athlete	Event	Heat		Semifinal		Final	
Athlete	Event	Time	Rank	Time	Rank	Time	Rank
Mazen Metwaly	10 km open water	—N/a				1:54:33.2	24
Shehab Younis	50 m freestyle	23.16	34	Did not advance			

Women

Athlete	Event	Heat		Semifinal		Final	
Athlete	Event	Time	Rank	Time	Rank	Time	Rank
Farida Osman	50 m freestyle	26.34	40	Did not advance			

Key: Q = Qualified for the next round; WR = World record; OR = Olympic record; NR = National record; N/A = Round not applicable for the event; Bye = Athlete not required to compete in round

== Synchronized swimming ==
Egypt's synchronized swimming team qualified for the Olympics by being the top African nation at the 2011 World Aquatics Championships. It was the second time that the nation had qualified for the team event, having previously appeared in 2008. Shaza Abdelrahman and Dalia El-Gebaly, veterans of the 2008 tournament, represented Egypt in the duet, where they placed 24th and last. In the team competition, the nation finished seventh out of eight nations, ranking higher than Australia.

Athlete	Event	Technical routine		Free routine (preliminary)			Free routine (final)		
Athlete	Event	Points	Rank	Points	Total (technical + free)	Rank	Points	Total (technical + free)	Rank
Shaza Abdelrahman; Dalia El-Gebaly	Duet	75.700	24	76.400	152.100	24	Did not advance		
Reem Abdalazem; Shaza Abdelrahman; Aya Darwish; Nour El-Afandi; Dalia El-Gebaly; Samar Hassounah; Youmna Khallaf; Mai Mohamed	Team	77.600	7	—N/a			78.360	155.960	7

Key: N/A = Round not applicable for the event

== Table tennis ==
Six Egyptian table tennis players, three men and three women, qualified for the Olympics, four for the singles and an additional two for the team events. The four singles competitors, Omar Assar, El-sayed Lashin, Nadeen El-Dawlatly, and Dina Meshref, all qualified based on their achievements at the 2011 All-Africa Games. At this tournament, Assar won the singles event, was part of the victorious Egyptian team, finished second in the doubles with Emad Moselhy, and placed third in the mixed doubles alongside Meshref. He also won silver in the singles and gold in the team event at the 2011 Pan Arab Games. In London he defeated Yaroslav Zhmudenko of Ukraine in the opening round, but lost to Greece's Panagiotis Gionis in round two. Lashin was the runner-up in the singles at the 2011 All-Africa Games, as well as the winner of the doubles (with Ahmed Saleh), a bronze medalist in the mixed doubles (alongside El-Dawlatly), and a member of the gold medal-earning Egyptian team. His list of international medals stretched back to the 1996 African Championships, where he won a gold medal in the team event, and he had previously appeared in the Olympic Games in 2000 and 2008. In London he defeated Pär Gerell of Sweden and Zoran Primorac of Croatia before losing to Japan's Jun Mizutani in the third round. For the team event, Assar and Lashin were joined by Saleh, a 2008 Olympic veteran whose victories went as far back at the doubles event at the 1996 Arab Championships, but they were eliminated in the opening round.

El-Dawlatly had been fourth in the singles at the 2011 All-Africa Games, as well as third in the doubles and mixed doubles (with Meshref and Lashin respectively), and was a member of the gold medal-winning Egyptian team. She had also earned gold in the team event and the doubles and silver in the singles at the 2011 Pan Arab Games. In London she was defeated in the opening round by Denmark's Mie Skov. Meshref had the same results as El-Dawlatly at the 2011 All-African Games, except for being fifth in the singles, and took gold in the singles, doubles, and team events at the 2011 Pan Arab Games. In London she defeated Offiong Edem of Nigeria and Yana Noskova of Russia before being overcome by Romania's Elizabeta Samara. For the team event, El-Dawlatly and Meshref were joined by Raghd Magdy, who had been third in the doubles and mixed doubles, as well as runner-up in the team competition, at the 2003 All-Africa Games. The Egyptian women were defeated by the Dutch in the first round.

Men

Athlete	Event	Preliminary round	Round 1	Round 2	Round 3	Round 4	Quarterfinals	Semifinals	Final / BM	
Athlete	Event	Opposition Result	Opposition Result	Opposition Result	Opposition Result	Opposition Result	Opposition Result	Opposition Result	Opposition Result	Rank
Omar Assar	Singles	Bye	Zhmudenko (UKR); **W** 4–1	Gionis (GRE); **L** 0–4	Did not advance					
El-sayed Lashin	Singles	Bye	Gerell (SWE); **W** 4–3	Primorac (CRO); **W** 4–3	Mizutani (JPN); **L** 1–4	Did not advance				
Omar Assar; El-sayed Lashin; Ahmed Saleh	Team	—N/a				Austria; **L** 0–3	Did not advance			

Women

Athlete	Event	Preliminary round	Round 1	Round 2	Round 3	Round 4	Quarterfinals	Semifinals	Final / BM	
Athlete	Event	Opposition Result	Opposition Result	Opposition Result	Opposition Result	Opposition Result	Opposition Result	Opposition Result	Opposition Result	Rank
Nadeen El-Dawlatly	Singles	Bye	Skov (DEN); **L** 0–4	Did not advance						
Dina Meshref	Singles	Edem (NGR); **W** 4–2	Noskova (RUS); **W** 4–3	Samara (ROU); **L** 1–4	Did not advance					
Nadeen El-Dawlatly; Raghad Magdy; Dina Meshref	Team	—N/a				Netherlands; **L** 0–3	Did not advance			

Key: BM = Bronze medal match; N/A = Round not applicable for the event; Bye = Athlete not required to compete in round

== Taekwondo ==
Four Egyptian taekwondo practitioners, two men and two women, qualified for the Olympics, all of whom finished first at the African Qualification tournament, except for Abdelrahman Ossama in the men's 80 kg class, who was second behind Morocco's Issam Chernoubi. Tamer Bayoumi, a bronze medalist from the 2004 Olympics, was the most successful of the quartet. In the 58 kg class he defeated Nursultan Mamayev of Kazakhstan in the round of 16 before losing in sudden death to Lee Dae-Hoon of South Korea, the eventual silver medalist, in the quarterfinals. In the repechage he was defeated by Thailand's Pen-Ek Karaket. The only other Egyptian to win a match was Hedaya Malak, in the women's 57 kg, who overcame Robin Cheong of New Zealand before being defeated by Marlène Harnois of France, an eventual bronze medalist. In his first bout, Ossama lost to Tommy Mollet of the Netherlands in sudden death, while Seham El-Sawalhy, the 2010 and 2012 African champion, was eliminated by Sweden's Elin Johansson in the round of 16 of the women's 67 kg class.

Athlete	Event	Round of 16	Quarterfinals	Semifinals	Repechage	Bronze medal	Final	
Athlete	Event	Opposition Result	Opposition Result	Opposition Result	Opposition Result	Opposition Result	Opposition Result	Rank
Tamer Bayoumi	Men's −58 kg	Mamayev (KAZ); **W** 1–0 SDP	Lee D-H (KOR); **L** 10–11 SDP	Did not advance	Karaket (THA); **L** 4–6	Did not advance		
Abdelrahman Ossama	Men's −80 kg	Mollet (NED); **L** 8–9 SDP	Did not advance					
Hedaya Malak	Women's −57 kg	Cheong (NZL); **W** 17–6	Harnois (FRA); **L** 6–8	Did not advance				
Seham El-Sawalhy	Women's −67 kg	Johansson (SWE); **L** 0–6	Did not advance					

Key: Bye = Athlete not required to compete in round; SDP = Decision by sudden death point

== Weightlifting ==
Five Egyptian men, Ahmed Saad, Mohamed Abdelbaki, Ibrahim Ramadan, Ragab Abdelhay, and Tarek Yehia, qualified for the Olympic weightlifting tournament by ranking seventh overall after the 2010 and 2011 World Weightlifting Championships, and three women, Esmat Mansour, Abeer Abdelrahman, and Nahla Ramadan, by ranking fourteenth. For the women, Ramadan, a gold medalist at the 2003 World Weightlifting Championships and the 2011 Pan Arab Games, bronze medalist at the 2002 World Championships, and veteran of the 75 kg class at the 2004 Summer Olympics, finished fourth in the +75 kg class. Abdelrahman, another gold medalist from the 2011 Pan Arab Games and veteran of the 69 kg class at the 2008 Summer Olympics, was fifth in the 75 kg division, although she received a silver medal retroactively after the event's three medalists were disqualified for doping. Mansour, contesting the 69 kg class, was seventh in her event.

For the men, Yehia, a silver medalist at the 2011 Pan Arab Games, bronze medalist at the 2010 World Championships, and veteran of the 69 kg class at the 2008 Summer Olympics, had the nation's best result, with a fourth-place finish in the 85 kg division that was later upgraded to bronze after runner-up Apti Aukhadov of Russia failed a doping test. His countryman Abdelhay, the gold medalist from the 2011 Pan Arab Games, was ranked fifth in the same event after Aukhadov was disqualified. Saad, a silver medalist at the 2011 Pan Arab Games who had taken part in the 56 kg class at the 2004 Summer Olympics, was ninth in the 62 kg event. Abdelbaki, another gold medalist from the 2011 Pan Arab Games and a veteran of the 62 kg event at the 2008 Summer Olympics, was tenth in the 69 kg class, while Ramadan, also a gold medalist at the 2011 Pan Arab Games, was fifth in the 77kg event.

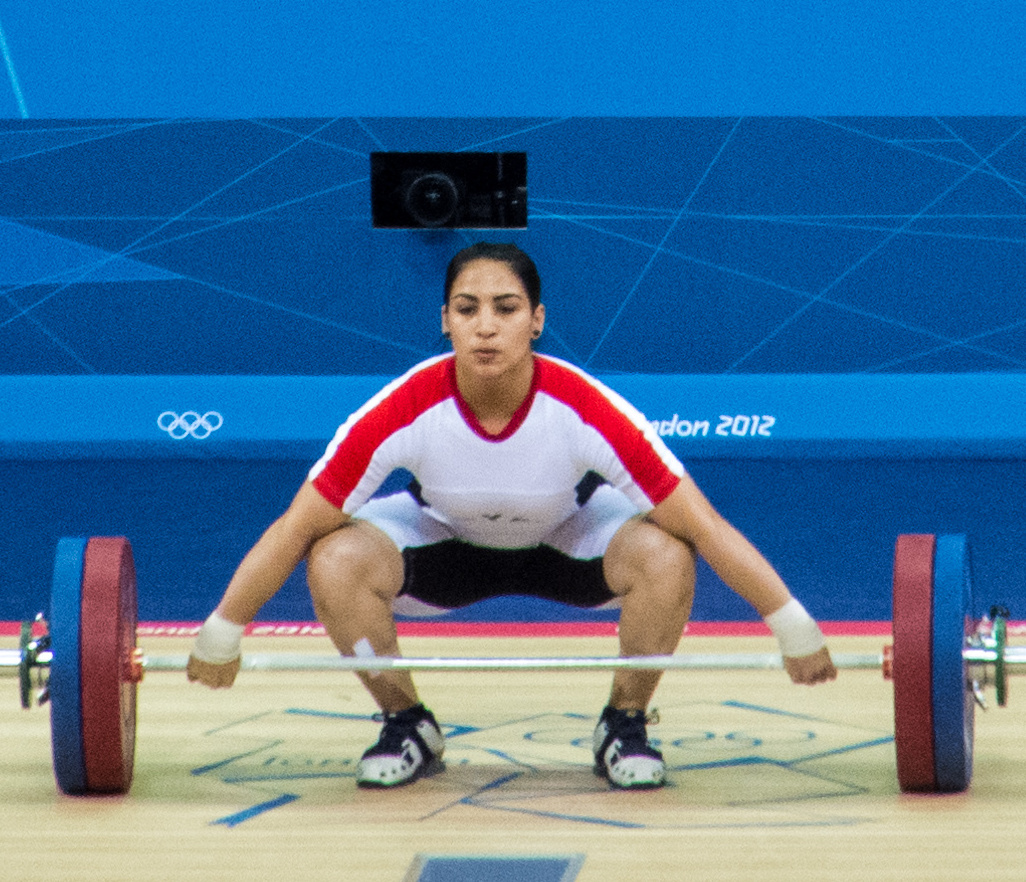
Abeer Abdelrahman, a gold medalist from the 2011 Pan Arab Games, was awarded a silver medal in the 75 kg division retroactively.

Men

Athlete	Event	Snatch		Clean & jerk		Total	Rank
Athlete	Event	Result	Rank	Result	Rank	Total	Rank
Ahmed Saad	−62 kg	130	9	162	9	292	9
Mohamed Abdelbaki	−69 kg	145	6	171	11	316	10
Ibrahim Ramadan	−77 kg	155	5	192	3	347	5
Ragab Abdelhay	−85 kg	165	7	207	4	372	5
Tarek Yehia	−85 kg	165	7	210	2	375	3rd place, bronze medalist(s)

Women

Athlete	Event	Snatch		Clean & jerk		Total	Rank
Athlete	Event	Result	Rank	Result	Rank	Total	Rank
Esmat Mansour	−69 kg	105	7	130	7	235	7
Abeer Abdelrahman	−75 kg	118	2	140	2	258	2nd place, silver medalist(s)
Nahla Ramadan	+75 kg	122	4	155	3	277	4

Key: WR = World record; OR = Olympic record; NR = National record

== Wrestling ==
Thirteen Egyptian wrestlers, twelve men and one woman, qualified for the Olympics. In the men's freestyle tournament, only Hassan Madany in the 60 kg class defeated an opponent, winning his bout against Didier Pais of France in the round of 16 before losing to North Korea's Ri Jong-Myong in the quarterfinals. Madany was a veteran of the 2008 tournament, where he lost his first bout against eventual bronze medalist Morad Mohammadi of Iran, and qualified for the 2012 Games by winning the African and Oceania qualification tournament. Among numerous honors, he was a seven-time African champion (2002, 2005–2009, and 2012) and also won gold medals at the 2005 and 2009 Mediterranean Games and the 2011 Pan Arab Games. The only other Egyptian freestyle wrestler to take part in more than one bout was Ibrahim Farag in the 55 kg class, who lost against eventual silver medalist Vladimer Khinchegashvili of Georgia in the qualification round and Bulgaria's Radoslav Velikov in the repechage. He was African senior champion in 2010 and junior champion in 2009.

Farag, along with Abdou Omar in the 66 kg class, Saleh Emara in the 96 kg class, and El-Desoky Ismail in the 120 kg class, qualified by winning the African and Oceania qualification tournament. Omar, the 2009 and 2010 African champion and a gold medalist at the 2011 Pan American Games, and Emara, who won gold medals at the 2007 All-Africa Games, the 2009 Mediterranean Games, and the 2011 Pan Arab Games, were disqualified after arriving late for their events, while Ismail, a four-time African Champion and bronze medalist at the 2011 Pan Arab Games, was eliminated in the opening round by Tervel Dlagnev of the United States. In women's freestyle wrestling, Rabab Eid qualified for the 55 kg class by coming in second at the African and Oceania qualification tournament, behind Marwa Amri of Tunisia. At the Games, she was defeated by Ukraine's Tetyana Lazareva in the round of 16.

In Greco-Roman wrestling, Karam Gaber, the gold medal winner in the 96 kg class at the 2004 Summer Olympics, won a silver medal in the 84 kg class after losing the final to Russia's Alan Khugayev. Along the way he defeated Nenad Žugaj of Croatia, Mélonin Noumonvi of France, and Damian Janikowski of Poland. He qualified for the Gamea after winning the African and Oceania qualification tournament. The only other Egyptian wrestler to win a bout was Ashraf El-Gharably in the 66 kg class. Gharably, who qualified for the Games after coming in second in the African and Oceania qualification tournament, behind Mohamed Serir of Tunisia, had held numerous international titles since 1997, when he first won the African championships, and had participated in the 60 kg class at the 2004 and 2008 Summer Olympics. In 2012 he defeated Ecuador's Orlando Huacón in the round of 16 before losing to eventual bronze medalist Manuchar Tskhadaia of Georgia in the quarterfinals.

Sayed Abdelmoneim, competing in the 60 kg class, and Abdelrahman El-Trabely, competing in the 120 kg class, both lost in the first round against one of the eventual finalists and were defeated a second time in the repechage. Abdelmoneim had been the 2010 African champion and had qualified for the Olympics by winning the African and Oceania qualification tournament. In London he lost to Georgia's Revaz Lashkhi and Russia's Zaur Kuramagomedov, eventual silver and bronze medalists respectively. El-Trabely was the 2011 African runner-up and was second in the African and Oceania qualification tournament behind Tunisia's Radhouane Chebbi. At the Games he lost against 2008 and 2012 Olympic champion Mijaín López of Cuba and Guram Pherselidze of Georgia. Mohamed Abouhalima, Islam Tolba, and Mohamed Abdelfatah all lost their opening bouts and were eliminated without appearing in the repechage. Abouhalima, competing in the 55kg class, was the 2011 junior and 2012 senior African champion and won the African and Oceania qualifying tournament. Tolba, competing in the 74 kg class, was the runner up at the 2011 African Championships, 2011 Pan Arab Games, and the African and Oceania qualifying tournament, behind Tunisia's Zied Ayet Ikram of Tunisia all three times. Abdelfatah had accrued numerous international honors since winning the 83 kg class at the 1997 Pan Arab Games and was a veteran of the 85 kg class at the 2000 Summer Olympics and the 84 kg class at the 2004 edition. In London he competed in the 96 kg class and qualified by coming in fifth at the 2011 World Championships.

Men's freestyle

Athlete	Event	Qualification	Round of 16	Quarterfinal	Semifinal	Repechage 1	Repechage 2	Final / BM	
Athlete	Event	Opposition Result	Opposition Result	Opposition Result	Opposition Result	Opposition Result	Opposition Result	Opposition Result	Rank
Ibrahim Farag	−55 kg	Khinchegashvili (GEO); **L** 1–3 ^{PP}	Did not advance			Velikov (BUL); **L** 0–3 ^{PO}	Did not advance		13
Hassan Madany	−60 kg	Bye	Pais (FRA); **W** 3–1 ^{PP}	Ri J-M (PRK); **L** 1–3 ^{PP}	Did not advance				8
Abdou Omar	-66 kg	Bye	Safaryan (ARM); **L** 0–5 ^{VB}	Did not advance					18
Saleh Emara	−96 kg	Bye	Gogshelidze (GEO); **L** 0–5 ^{VB}	Did not advance					19
El-Desoky Ismail	−120 kg	Bye	Dlagnev (USA); **L** 1–3 ^{PP}	Did not advance					11

Men's Greco-Roman

Athlete	Event	Qualification	Round of 16	Quarterfinal	Semifinal	Repechage 1	Repechage 2	Final / BM	
Athlete	Event	Opposition Result	Opposition Result	Opposition Result	Opposition Result	Opposition Result	Opposition Result	Opposition Result	Rank
Mohamed Abouhalima	−55 kg	Mango (USA); **L** 0–3 ^{PO}	Did not advance						14
Sayed Abdelmoneim	−60 kg	Bye	Lashkhi (GEO); **L** 0–3 ^{PO}	Did not advance		Bye	Kuramagomedov (RUS); **L** 0–3 ^{PO}	Did not advance	11
Ashraf El-Gharably	−66 kg	Bye	Huacón (ECU); **W** 3–1 ^{PP}	Tskhadaia (GEO); **L** 0–3 ^{PO}	Did not advance				10
Islam Tolba	−74 kg	Žugaj (CRO); **L** 0–3 ^{PO}	Did not advance						16
**Karam Gaber**	−84 kg	Bye	Žugaj (CRO); **W** 3–1 ^{PP}	Noumonvi (FRA); **W** 3–1 ^{PP}	Janikowski (POL); **W** 3–1 ^{PP}	Bye		Khugayev (RUS); **L** 0–3 ^{PO}	2nd place, silver medalist(s)
Mohamed Abdelfatah	−96 kg	Dzeinichenka (BLR); **L** 1–3 ^{PP}	Did not advance						13
Abdelrahman El-Trabely	−120 kg	Bye	López (CUB); **L** 0–3 ^{PO}	Did not advance		Bye	Pherselidze (GEO); **L** 1–3 ^{PP}	Did not advance	12

Women's freestyle

Athlete	Event	Qualification	Round of 16	Quarterfinal	Semifinal	Repechage 1	Repechage 2	Final / BM	
Athlete	Event	Opposition Result	Opposition Result	Opposition Result	Opposition Result	Opposition Result	Opposition Result	Opposition Result	Rank
Rabab Eid	−55 kg	Bye	Lazareva (UKR); **L** 0–5 ^{VT}	Did not advance					16

Key: BM = Bronze medal match; VT = Victory by Fall; PP = Decision by Points – the loser with technical points; PO = Decision by Points – the loser without technical points; Bye = Athlete not required to compete in round
