= Archery at the 2011 Arab Games =

Archery at the 2011 Pan Arab Games
- Venue: Lusail Complex
- Location: Doha, Qatar
- Dates: 12-15 December

At the 2011 Pan Arab Games, the archery events were held at Lusail Complex in Doha, Qatar from 12–15 December. A total of 19 events were contested.

== Medal summary ==
=== Men ===
Event	Gold	Silver	Bronze
Individual Compound	Abdulaziz Al-Obadi (QAT)	Abdulaziz Mohammed Alrodhan (KSA)	Ahmed Fakhry (EGY)
Individual Compound	Abdulaziz Al-Obadi (QAT)	Abdulaziz Mohammed Alrodhan (KSA)	Amr Ghanem (EGY)
Individual Comp. 2x50m (1)	Abdulaziz Al-Obadi (QAT)	Khaled Elsaid (EGY)	Abdulaziz Mohammed Alrodhan (KSA)
Individual Comp. 2x50m (1)	Abdulaziz Al-Obadi (QAT)	Khaled Elsaid (EGY)	Mosab Saleh Sulaimani (KSA)
Individual Comp. 2x50 (2)	Ahmed Fakhry (EGY)	Ammar Al-Khazraji (IRQ)	Abdulaziz Mohammed Alrodhan (KSA)
Individual Comp. 2x50 (2)	Ahmed Fakhry (EGY)	Ammar Al-Khazraji (IRQ)	Mosab Saleh Sulaimani (KSA)
Individual Comp. FITA	Abdulaziz Mohammed Alrodhan (KSA)	Abdulaziz Al-Obadi (QAT)	Ammar Al-Khazraji (IRQ)
Individual Comp. FITA	Abdulaziz Mohammed Alrodhan (KSA)	Abdulaziz Al-Obadi (QAT)	Ahmed Fakhry (EGY)
Team Compound	Egypt (EGY); Khaled Elsaid; Ahmed Fakhry; Amr Ghanem	Iraq (IRQ); Eshaq Al-Daghman; Ammar Al-Khazraji; Amir Mamoori	Qatar (QAT); Farhan Abdorabboh; Ahmed Al-Abadi; Abdulaziz Al-Obadi
Team Compound	Egypt (EGY); Khaled Elsaid; Ahmed Fakhry; Amr Ghanem	Iraq (IRQ); Eshaq Al-Daghman; Ammar Al-Khazraji; Amir Mamoori	Saudi Arabia (KSA); Abdulrahman Alengari; Abdulaziz Mohammed Alrodhan; Mosab Saleh Sulaimani
Individual Recurve	Ibrahim Al-Mohandi (QAT)	Ali Ahmed Salem (QAT)	Turki Mohammad Alderbi (KSA)
Individual Recurve	Ibrahim Al-Mohandi (QAT)	Ali Ahmed Salem (QAT)	Ibrahim Sabry (EGY)
Individual Rec. 30m	Ali Ahmed Salem (QAT)	Sami Saad Albawardi (KSA)	Hady Elkholosy (EGY)
Individual Rec. 30m	Ali Ahmed Salem (QAT)	Sami Saad Albawardi (KSA)	Mohammed Jasim (IRQ)
Individual Rec. 50m	Ibrahim Sabry (EGY)	Bouchaib Machi (MAR)	Turki Mohammad Alderbi (KSA)
Individual Rec. 50m	Ibrahim Sabry (EGY)	Bouchaib Machi (MAR)	Hady Elkholosy (EGY)
Individual Rec. 70m	Mohamed Bouchane (MAR)	Mohammed Jasim (IRQ)	Rachid El Bennaye (MAR)
Individual Rec. 70m	Mohamed Bouchane (MAR)	Mohammed Jasim (IRQ)	Ali Ahmed Salem (QAT)
Individual Rec. 90m	Ahmed El-Nemr (EGY)	Mohamed Bouchane (MAR)	Mohammed Abdelhady (EGY)
Individual Rec. 90m	Ahmed El-Nemr (EGY)	Mohamed Bouchane (MAR)	Hady Elkholosy (EGY)
Individual Rec. FITA	Hady Elkholosy (EGY)	Ahmed El-Nemr (EGY)	Ibrahim Al-Mohanadi (QAT)
Individual Rec. FITA	Hady Elkholosy (EGY)	Ahmed El-Nemr (EGY)	Mohammed Jasim (IRQ)
Team Recurve	Iraq (IRQ); Ali Al-Hamadani; Mohammed Jasim; Ali Salman	Egypt (EGY); Hady Elkholosy; Ahmed El-Nemr; Ibrahim Sabry	Qatar (QAT); Ibrahim Al-Mohanadi; Israf Rustam Khan; Ali Ahmed Salem
Team Recurve	Iraq (IRQ); Ali Al-Hamadani; Mohammed Jasim; Ali Salman	Egypt (EGY); Hady Elkholosy; Ahmed El-Nemr; Ibrahim Sabry	Saudi Arabia (KSA); Mohammed Al Abdulmuhsin; Turki Mohammad Alderbi; Khalid Hamad Alhazmi

=== Women ===
Event	Gold	Silver	Bronze
Individual Recurve	Amira Mansour (EGY)	Nada Kamel (EGY)	Btissam Farjia (MAR)
Individual Recurve	Amira Mansour (EGY)	Nada Kamel (EGY)	Hania Fouda (EGY)
Individual Rec. 30m	Amira Mansour (EGY)	Btissam Farjia (MAR)	Rand Al-Mashhadani (IRQ)
Individual Rec. 30m	Amira Mansour (EGY)	Btissam Farjia (MAR)	Nada Kamel (EGY)
Individual Rec. 50m	Amira Mansour (EGY)	Rand Al-Mashhadani (IRQ)	Aya Kamel (EGY)
Individual Rec. 50m	Amira Mansour (EGY)	Rand Al-Mashhadani (IRQ)	Nada Kamel (EGY)
Individual Rec. 60m	Nada Kamel (EGY)	Aya Kamel (EGY)	Hania Fouda (EGY)
Individual Rec. 60m	Nada Kamel (EGY)	Aya Kamel (EGY)	Amira Mansour (EGY)
Individual Rec. 70m	Amira Mansour (EGY)	Nada Kamel (EGY)	Rand Al-Mashhadani (IRQ)
Individual Rec. 70m	Amira Mansour (EGY)	Nada Kamel (EGY)	Btissam Farjia (MAR)
Individual Rec. FITA	Amira Mansour (EGY)	Nada Kamel (EGY)	Rand Al-Mashhadani (IRQ)
Individual Rec. FITA	Amira Mansour (EGY)	Nada Kamel (EGY)	Btissam Farjia (MAR)
Team Recurve	Egypt (EGY); Hania Fouda; Nada Kamel; Amira Mansour	Morocco (MAR); Khadija Abbouda; Btissam Farjia; Fatine Ouadoudi	Iraq (IRQ); Farah Al-Dakheel; Ghazwa Al-Jameel; Rand Al-Mashhadani

== Medal table ==
* Host nation (Qatar)

Rank	Nation	Gold	Silver	Bronze	Total
1	Egypt	12	7	14	33
2	Qatar*	4	2	4	10
3	Iraq	1	4	7	12
4	Morocco	1	4	4	9
5	Saudi Arabia	1	2	8	11
Totals (5 entries)		19	19	37	75
