= Shooting at the 2011 Arab Games =

Shooting at the 2011 Pan Arab Games
- Venue: Lusail Complex
- Location: Doha, Qatar
- Dates: 9-23 December

At the 2011 Pan Arab Games, the shooting events were held at Lusail Complex in Doha, Qatar from 9–23 December. A total of 36 events were contested.

== Medal summary ==
=== Men ===
Event	Gold	Silver	Bronze
50m Rifle 3 Positions	Mohamed Hassan (EGY)	Khalid Alanazi (KSA)	Hamed Al Khatri (OMA)
50m Rifle 3 Positions Team	Egypt (EGY); Ahmed Darwish; Amgad Hassan; Mohamed Hassan	Saudi Arabia (KSA); Faiz Alanazi; Khalid Alanazi; Hussain Alharbi	Oman (OMA); Jamal Al Bulushi; MoHammed Al Hattali; Hamed Al Khatri
50m Rifle Prone	Ali Al-Muhannadi (QAT)	Jamal Alsebbah (BHR)	Abdulaziz Alrowaiei (BHR)
50m Rifle Prone Team	Bahrain (BHR); Abdulaziz Alrowaiei; Jamal Alsebbah; Salman Zaman	Qatar (QAT); Abdulla Al-Maadeed; Ali Rashid Al-Muhannadi; Ali Al-Qahtani	Saudi Arabia (KSA); Khalid Alanazi; Abdullah Albogami; Sunhat Alotaibi
10m Air Rifle	Mohamed Hassan (EGY)	Khalid Alanazi (KSA)	Khaled Alsubaie (KUW)
10m Air Rifle Team	Egypt (EGY); Mohamed Abdelkader; Mohamed Hassan; Peter Soliman	Saudi Arabia (KSA); Faiz Alanazi; Khalid Alanazi; Nasser Alharthi	Kuwait (KUW); Ali Alemtairy; Abdullah Alharbi; Khaled Alsubaie
50m Pistol	Mohammed Alsaeed (KSA)	Dhiyaa Mahroos (IRQ)	Jamal Al Hattali (OMA)
50m Pistol Team	Saudi Arabia (KSA); Mohammed Alamri; Aqeel Albadrani; Mohammed Alsaeed	Oman (OMA); Ismail Al Abri; Said Al Hasani; Jamal Al Hattali	Bahrain (BHR); Abdulmajed Abulkhaliq; Khalid Omar; Ashban Sulaiman
25m Rapid Fire Pistol	Said Al Hashmi (OMA)	Zafer Faraj Al-Qahtani (QAT)	Said Al Hasani (OMA)
25m Rapid Fire Pistol Team	Qatar (QAT); Zafer Faraj Al-Qahtani; Adel Khan; Riaz Rustam Khan	Egypt (EGY); Hesham Ahmed; Mahmoud Ahmed; Amir Ibrahim	Bahrain (BHR); Abdulmajed Abulkhaliq; Ashban Sulaiman; Sami Yahya
25m Standard Pistol	Mohammed Alsaeed (KSA)	Mahmoud Ahmed (EGY)	Mohammed Alamri (KSA)
25m Standard Pistol Team	Saudi Arabia (KSA); Mohammed Alamri; Safar Aldosari; Mohammed Alsaeed	Egypt (EGY); Hesham Ahmed; Mahmoud Ahmed; Hassan Elghoul	Oman (OMA); Said Al Hasani; Said Al Hashmi; Hilal Al Khatri
25m Center Fire Pistol	Mohammed Alamri (KSA)	Aqeel Albadrani (KSA)	Hesham Ahmed (EGY)
25m Center Fire Pistol Team	Saudi Arabia (KSA); Mohammed Alamri; Aqeel Albadrani; Mohammed Alsaeed	Qatar (QAT); Zafer Faraj Al-Qahtani; Adel Khan; Riaz Rustam Khan	Bahrain (BHR); Abdilmajed Abulkhaliq; Khalid Omar; Ashban Sulaiman
10m Air Pistol	Amine Adjabi (ALG)	Mohammed Alsaeed (KSA)	Dhiyaa Mahroos (IRQ)
10m Air Pistol Team	Saudi Arabia (KSA); Aqeel Albadrani; Safar Aldosari; Mohammed Alsaeed	Algeria (ALG); Amine Abjabi Fateh Ziadi	Iraq (IRQ); Nooruldeen Abbas; Dhiyaa Mahroos; Ali Mohsin
Trap	Naser Meqlad (KUW)	Mohammed Al-Rumaihi (QAT)	Joe Salem (LIB)
Trap Team	Lebanon (LIB); Walid El Najjar; Joseph Ishaya Hanna; Joe Salem	Kuwait (KUW); Khaled Almudhaf; Naser Meqlad; Souad Meqled	Qatar (QAT); Hamad Al-Adba; Rashid Hamad Al-Athba; Mohammed Ahmed Al-Rumaihi
Double Trap	Fehaid Aldeehani (KUW)	Rashid Hamad Al-Athba (QAT)	Saif Al Shamsi (UAE)
Double Trap Team	United Arab Emirates (UAE); Juma Al Maktoum; Saif Al Shamsi; Mohammad Dhahi	Kuwait (KUW); Fehaid Aldeehani; Meshfi Almutairi; Saad Almutairi	Oman (OMA); Mohammed Al Habsi; Ahmed Al Hatmi; Ammar Al Hinai
Skeet	Saeed Al Maktoum (UAE)	Azmi Mehilba (EGY)	Abdullah Alrashidi (KUW)
Skeet Team	Qatar (QAT); Nasser Saleh Al-Attiya; Masoud Hamad; Rashid Saleh Hamad	United Arab Emirates (UAE); Mohammad Ahmed; Saeed Al Maktoum; Saif Bin Futais	Kuwait (KUW); Naser Aldihani; Zaid Almutairi; Abdullah Alrashidi

=== Women ===
Event	Gold	Silver	Bronze
50m Rifle 3 Positions	Bahya Al-Hamad (QAT)	Matara Fahad Al-Aseiri (QAT)	Maryam Arzouqi (KUW)
50m Rifle 3 Positions Team	Qatar (QAT); Matar Fahad Al-Aseiri; Bahya Mansoor Al-Hamad; Shaikha Khalaf Al-Mohammed	Bahrain (BHR); Azza Alqasmi; Lulwa Alzayani; Aysha Suwaileh	Egypt (EGY); Nourhan Amer; Noha Elessawy; Reham Mohamed
50m Rifle Prone	Maryam Arzouqi (KUW)	Azza Alqasmi (BHR)	Aysha Suwaileh (BHR)
50m Rifle Prone Team	Bahrain (BHR); Azza Alqasmi; Lulwa Alzayani; Aysha Suwaileh	Qatar (QAT); Mahbubeh Akhlaghi; Matara Fahad Al-Aseiri; Bahya Mansoor Al-Hamad	Egypt (EGY); Nourhan Amer; Noha Elessawy; Reham Mohamed
10m Air Rifle	Maryam Arzouqi (KUW)	Bahya Al-Hamad (QAT)	Mahbubeh Akhlaghi (QAT)
10m Air Rifle Team	Qatar (QAT); Mahbubeh Akhlaghi; Bahya Mansoor Al-Hamad; Shaikha Khalaf Al-Mohammed	Egypt (EGY); Nourhan Amer; Noha Elessawy; Shimaa Hashad	Kuwait (KUW); Ayat Alduwaikhi; Heba Arzouqi; Maryam Arzouqi
25m Pistol	Olfa Charni (TUN)	Sumaya Al Meshaiei (UAE)	Nasra Mahmoud (QAT)
25m Pistol Team	United Arab Emirates (UAE); Sumaya Al Meshaiei; Shamma Almuhairi; Shaikha Alrumaithii	Qatar (QAT); Souad Waleed Al-Khater; Nasra Mohammed Mahmoud; Hanadi Mubarak Salem	Iraq (IRQ); Noor Al-Ameri; Marwah Fadhil; Lamis Jehad
10m Air Pistol	Olfa Charni (TUN)	Radwa Ibrahim (EGY)	Noura Nasri (TUN)
10m Air Pistol Team	Egypt (EGY); Shimaa Eid; Amal Ibrahim; Radwa Ibrahim	Qatar (QAT); Souad Waleed Al-Khater; Dana Saad Almubarak; Nasra Mohammed Mahmoud	United Arab Emirates (UAE); Sumaya Al Meshaiei; Wafa Alali; Shaikha Alrumaithii
Trap	Amna Al-Abdulla (QAT)	Ray Bassil (LIB)	Shahad Alhawal (KUW)
Trap Team	Qatar (QAT); Amna Mesaad Al-Abdulla; Noora Essa Al-Ali; Nawal Hassan Al-Khalaf	Morocco (MAR); Hind Amani; Yasmine Marirhi; Yasmina Mesfioui	Kuwait (KUW); Sarah Alhawal; Shahad Alhawal; Sumaiah Juhail
Skeet	Eman Alshamaa (KUW)	Afrah Mohammad (KUW)	Amal Ahmed Al-Rafeea (QAT)
Skeet Team	Kuwait (KUW); Shaikhah Alrashidi; Eman Alshmaa; Afrah Mohammad	Qatar (QAT); Amal Ahmed Al-Rafeea; Reem Gholome Al-Sharshani; Deena Khamis Al-Tebaishi	Bahrain (BHR); Khulood Burashaid; Fatima Haider; Samah Hejres

== Medal table ==
* Host nation (Qatar)

Rank	Nation	Gold	Silver	Bronze	Total
1	Qatar*	8	11	4	23
2	Saudi Arabia	7	6	2	15
3	Kuwait	6	3	8	17
4	Egypt	5	6	3	14
5	United Arab Emirates	3	2	2	7
6	Bahrain	2	3	6	11
7	Tunisia	2	0	1	3
8	Oman	1	1	6	8
9	Lebanon	1	1	1	3
10	Algeria	1	1	0	2
11	Iraq	0	1	3	4
12	Morocco	0	1	0	1
Totals (12 entries)		36	36	36	108
