= Andrija Zlatić =

Serbian sport shooter (born 1978)

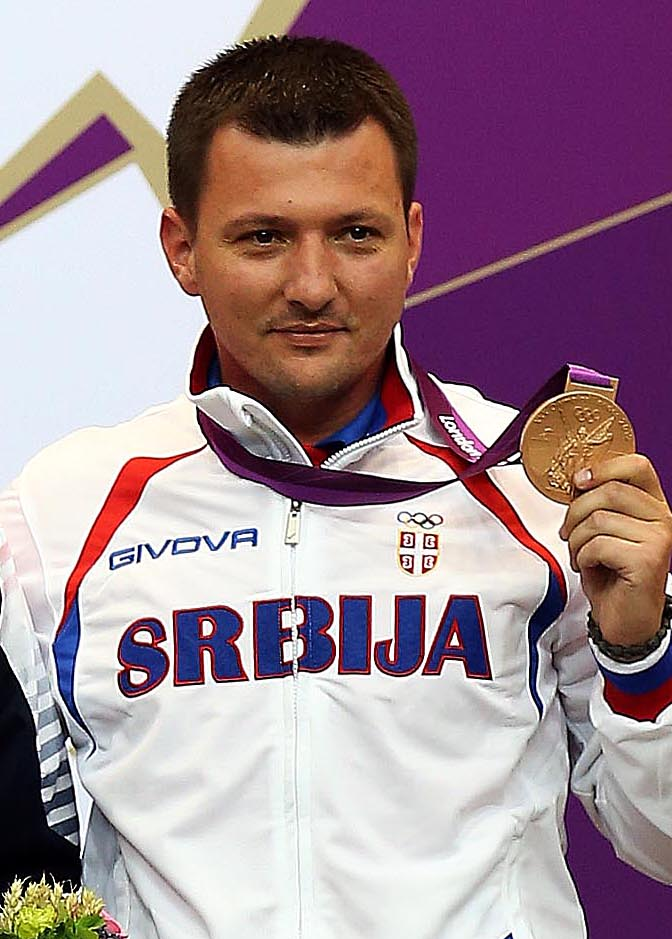
- Andrija Zlatić on the winner's podium at the 2012 Summer Olympics

Personal information
- Born: January 25, 1978 (age 48) Titovo Užice, SFR Yugoslavia
Medal record
Men's shooting
Representing Serbia
Olympic Games
Bronze medal – third place	2012 London	10 m Air Pistol
World Championships
Silver medal – second place	2002 Lahti	10 m Air Pistol
Silver medal – second place	2010 Munich	10 m Air Pistol
European Championships
Gold medal – first place	2009 Prague	10m Air Pistol
Gold medal – first place	2011 Belgrade	50m Pistol
Silver medal – second place	2011 Brescia	10m Air Pistol
Mediterranean Games
Silver medal – second place	2009 Pescara	10m Air Pistol
Bronze medal – third place	2009 Pescara	50 m Pistol
World Junior Championships
Gold medal – first place	1998 Barcelona	50 m Pistol

Andrija Zlatić (Serbian Cyrillic: Андрија Златић, born January 25, 1978) is a Serbian sport shooter. He is currently a member of Aleksa Dejović Užice.

In 1998 Andrija became junior world champion in shooting in Barcelona, Spain.

At the 2002 ISSF World Shooting Championships he won a silver medal in air pistol. At the 2004 Summer Olympics he represented Serbia and Montenegro. He was a first athlete from his country who qualified for 2004 Summer Olympics. In the 50m MK pistol event, he finished in 32nd place, while in the 10m air pistol event, he secured 13th place.

At the 2009 European Championships in Prague, he became European Champion in the 10m air pistol event. The same year, at the Mediterranean Games in Pescara, he won the silver medal in the 10m air pistol event and the bronze medal in the 50m pistol event. Eight years later, in 2010 he again became world vice champion in Munich, Germany in air pistol.

At the 2011 European Championships, he won the gold medal in the 50m pistol event in Belgrade and the silver medal in the 10m air pistol event in Brescia. Zlatić triumphed in the 2011 World Cup Finals in Wrocław and won “Crystal Globes” in the 50m pistol category.

At the 2012 Summer Olympics, he won a bronze medal in the 10m Air Pistol and finished 6th in the 50m Pistol.

Awards
Preceded by Saša Stolić	(Federal Republic of Yugoslavia) The Best Young Athlete of Yugoslavia; 1995	Succeeded by Lazar Lazarević
