= Shooting at the 2012 Summer Olympics – Men's 10 metre air pistol =

Men's 10 metre air pistol at the Games of the XXX Olympiad
- Venue: Royal Artillery Barracks
- Date: 28 July 2012
- Winning score: 688.2

Medalists
1st place, gold medalist(s)		Jin Jong-oh	South Korea
2nd place, silver medalist(s)		Luca Tesconi	Italy
3rd place, bronze medalist(s)		Andrija Zlatić	Serbia

The Men's 10 metre air pistol event at the 2012 Olympic Games took place on 28 July 2012 at the Royal Artillery Barracks.

The event consisted of two rounds: a qualifier and a final. In the qualifier, each shooter fired 60 shots with an air pistol at 10 metres distance. Scores for each shot were in increments of 1, with a maximum score of 10.

The top 8 shooters in the qualifying round moved on to the final round. There, they fired an additional 10 shots. These shots scored in increments of 0.1, with a maximum score of 10.9. The total score from all 70 shots was used to determine final ranking.

== Records ==
Prior to this competition, the existing world and Olympic records were as follows.

Qualification records
World record	Jin Jong-oh (KOR)	594	Changwon, Korea Republic	12 August 2009
Olympic record	Mikhail Nestruyev (RUS)	591	Athens, Greece	14 August 2004

Final records
World record	Sergei Pyzhianov (URS)	695.1 (593+102.1)	Munich, Germany	13 October 1989
Olympic record	Wang Yifu (CHN)	690.0 (590+100.0)	Athens, Greece	14 August 2004

== Qualification round ==
Rank	Athlete	Country	1	2	3	4	5	6	Total	Inner 10s	Notes
1	Jin Jong-oh	South Korea	99	98	96	98	99	98	588	31	Q
2	Pang Wei	China	100	98	97	98	98	95	586	26	Q
3	Andrija Zlatić	Serbia	97	96	100	99	96	97	585	25	Q
4	Pablo Carrera	Spain	98	99	96	100	96	96	585	22	Q
5	Luca Tesconi	Italy	98	96	98	96	98	98	584	21	Q
6	Oleh Omelchuk	Ukraine	97	98	98	98	96	96	583	24	Q
7	Kai Jahnsson	Finland	97	99	97	95	96	99	583	20	Q
8	João Costa	Portugal	97	97	99	98	96	96	583	18	Q
9	Hoàng Xuân Vinh	Vietnam	98	95	97	95	100	97	582	26	
10	Leonid Yekimov	Russia	94	98	95	99	97	99	582	23	
11	Kanstantsin Lukashyk	Belarus	97	96	98	98	96	97	582	16	
12	Tan Zongliang	China	98	97	95	97	96	98	581	28	
13	Tomoyuki Matsuda	Japan	98	94	97	97	97	98	581	18	
14	Ásgeir Sigurgeirsson	Iceland	97	96	97	98	96	96	580	25	
15	Juraj Tužinský	Slovakia	95	96	99	98	95	97	580	14	
16	Norayr Bakhtamyan	Armenia	95	99	97	98	97	93	579	13	
17	Damir Mikec	Serbia	97	95	95	99	96	96	578	23	
18	Franck Dumoulin	France	99	98	96	95	94	95	577	23	
19	Denys Kushnirov	Ukraine	97	95	96	96	97	96	577	21	
20	Arben Kucana	Albania	94	96	96	98	96	97	577	12	
21	Pavol Kopp	Slovakia	97	94	95	98	95	97	576	14	
22	Walter Lapeyre	France	96	95	96	96	98	94	575	20	
23	Daryl Szarenski	United States	97	93	97	95	98	95	575	19	
24	İsmail Keleş	Turkey	98	93	96	96	96	96	575	18	
25	Florian Schmidt	Germany	95	98	95	96	95	96	575	17	
26	Denis Kulakov	Russia	94	97	98	97	94	95	575	17	
27	Yusuf Dikeç	Turkey	92	95	95	98	96	99	575	15	
28	Daniel Repacholi	Australia	95	98	96	95	97	94	575	12	
29	Francesco Bruno	Italy	99	95	97	96	93	94	574	19	
30	Yury Dauhapolau	Belarus	96	93	97	95	94	96	571	14	
31	Vijay Kumar	India	94	95	94	97	97	93	570	20	
32	Patrick Scheuber	Switzerland	97	95	96	96	91	94	569	17	
33	Ebrahim Barkhordari	Iran	95	93	96	96	98	91	569	17	
34	Jason Turner	United States	95	96	91	96	97	94	569	15	
35	Choi Young-Rae	South Korea	93	97	96	94	94	95	569	12	
36	Roger Daniel	Trinidad and Tobago	97	94	94	93	94	96	568	10	
37	Jakkrit Panichpatikum	Thailand	97	95	93	95	93	93	566	12	
38	Karim Wagih	Egypt	92	92	97	98	95	92	566	12	
39	Maung Kyu	Myanmar	95	94	95	92	94	95	565	19	
40	Vyacheslav Podlesnyy	Kazakhstan	94	95	93	95	93	95	565	15	
41	Nikola Šaranović	Montenegro	92	93	96	96	93	95	565	13	
42	Sergio Sánchez	Guatemala	96	95	93	95	96	90	565	13	
43	Fateh Ziadi	Algeria	91	92	94	97	94	94	562	17	
44	Sergey Babikov	Tajikistan	90	96	94	95	94	93	562	13	

== Final ==
Rank	Athlete	Qual	1	2	3	4	5	6	7	8	9	10	Final	Total	Notes
1st place, gold medalist(s)	Jin Jong-oh (KOR)	588	10.6	10.5	10.4	10.1	10.4	9.3	9.0	9.4	9.7	10.8	100.2	688.2	
2nd place, silver medalist(s)	Luca Tesconi (ITA)	584	10.5	9.6	10.7	9.6	9.3	10.7	10.7	10.5	10.5	9.7	101.8	685.8	
3rd place, bronze medalist(s)	Andrija Zlatić (SRB)	585	10.0	9.8	9.2	10.3	9.8	10.6	10.5	9.5	10.3	10.2	100.2	685.2	
4	Pang Wei (CHN)	586	10.0	9.1	10.3	9.8	10.4	10.3	9.4	9.4	10.0	9.0	97.7	683.7	
5	Oleh Omelchuk (UKR)	583	10.4	10.1	10.3	10.5	10.0	10.5	10.5	8.5	9.5	10.3	100.6	683.6	
6	Pablo Carrera (ESP)	585	10.6	10.4	9.2	10.1	10.0	8.9	10.3	9.1	9.9	9.8	98.3	683.3	
7	João Costa (POR)	583	10.3	9.6	10.0	10.4	9.1	9.6	10.2	9.6	10.1	10.4	99.3	682.3	
8	Kai Jahnsson (FIN)	583	8.7	9.3	8.8	9.1	10.2	10.3	10.4	9.7	9.7	9.9	96.1	679.1	
