= Olfa Charni =

Tunisian sport shooter

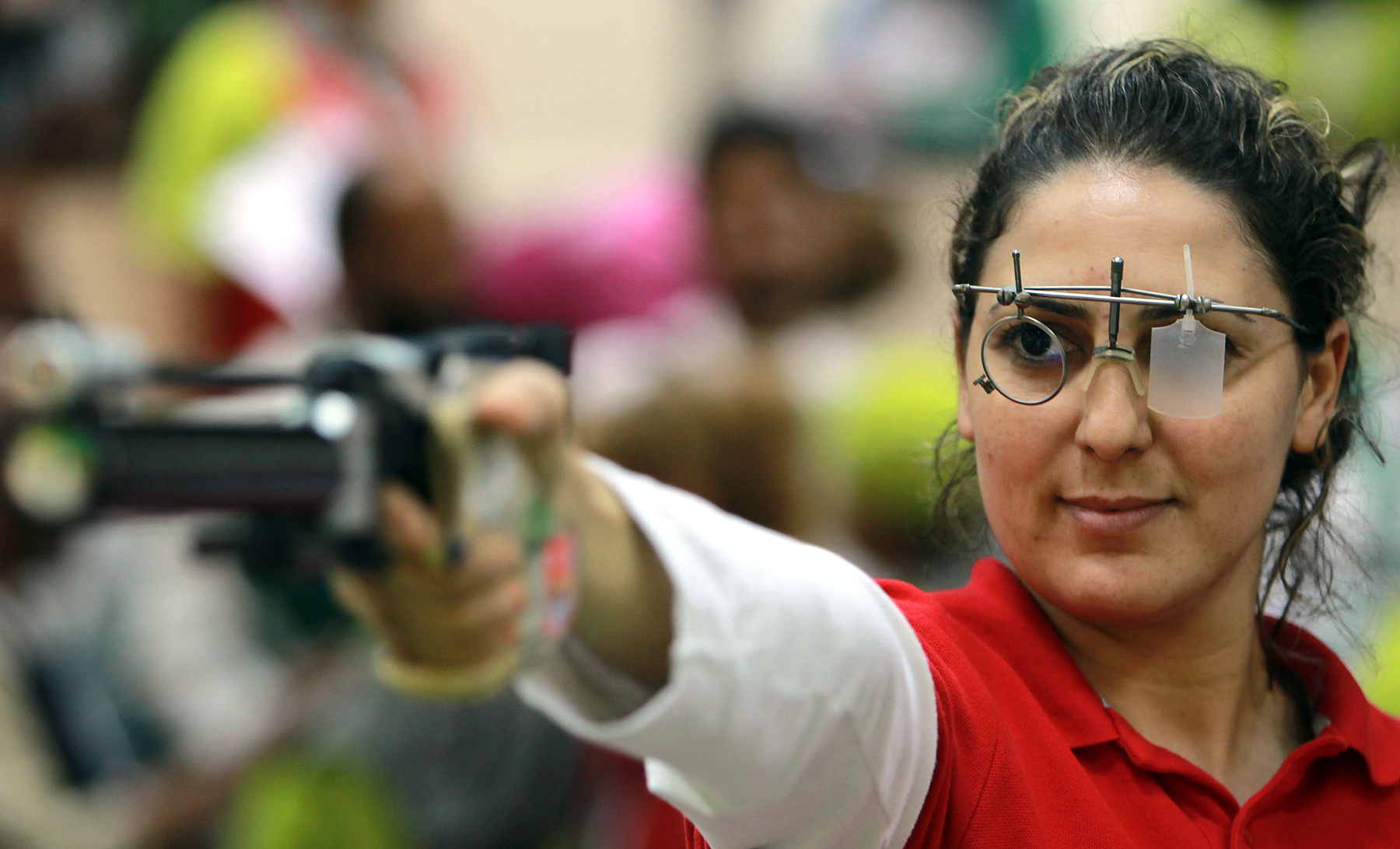
- Charni at the 2011 Pan Arab Games

Personal information
- Born: 24 May 1980 (age 46) Tunisia
- Height: 176 cm (5 ft 9 in)
- Weight: 65 kg (143 lb)

Sport
- Sport: Pistol shooting
Medal record
Representing Tunisia
Pan Arab Games
Gold medal – first place	2011 Doha	25 m pistol
Gold medal – first place	2011 Doha	10 m air pistol
African Championships
Gold medal – first place	2011 Cairo	25 m pistol, ind.
Gold medal – first place	2011 Cairo	10 m air pistol, ind.
Gold medal – first place	2015 Cairo	25 m pistol, ind.
Gold medal – first place	2015 Cairo	25 m pistol, team
Silver medal – second place	2015 Cairo	10 m air pistol, team

Olfa Charni (born 24 May 1980) is a pistol shooter from Tunisia. She won the individual 10 meter air pistol and 25 meter pistol at the 2011 Pan Arab Games and 2011 and 2015 African Championships, and qualified for the 2016 Summer Olympics in these events.

She competed at the 2020 Summer Olympics.
