= Luca Tesconi =

Italian sport shooter (born 1982)

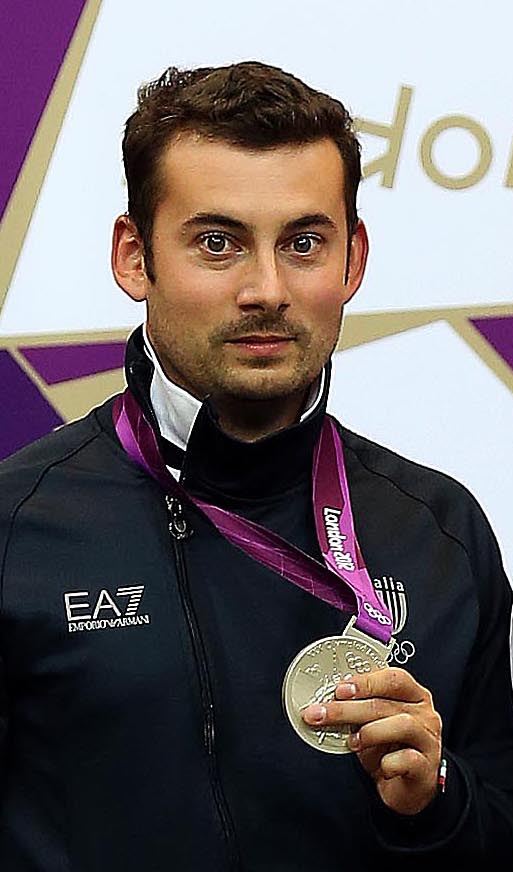
- Luca Tesconi on the winner's podium at the 2012 Summer Olympics

Personal information
- Nationality: Italian
- Born: 3 January 1982 (age 44) Pietrasanta, Italy
- Height: 1.77 m (5 ft 9 1/2 in)
- Weight: 73 kg (161 lb)

Sport
- Country: Italy
- Sport: Shooting
- Club: C.S. Carabinieri
Medal record
Olympic Games
Silver medal – second place	2012 London	10m air pisol
Mediterranean Games
Bronze medal – third place	2022 Oran	10 m air pistol
Bronze medal – third place	2022 Oran	10 m air pistol mixed team

Luca Tesconi (born 3 January 1982) is an Italian sports shooter who won a silver medal at the 2012 Summer Olympics.

== Biography ==
On 28 July, he won the 10m air pistol silver for Italy, in London Olympics 2012.
