= Ahmed Habash =

Egyptian windsurfer

Personal information
- Full name: Ahmed Muhammad Ismail; Kamil Habash
- Nationality: Egypt
- Born: 26 April 1984 (age 42) Giza, Egypt
- Height: 1.78 m (5 ft 10 in)
- Weight: 79 kg (174 lb)

Sport

Sailing career
- Class: Sailboard
- Club: Cairo Yacht Club
- Coach: Alaa Abdallah

Ahmed Muhammad Ismail Kamil Habash (born 26 April 1984) is an Egyptian windsurfer, who specialized in Neil Pryde RS:X class. He is currently trained for Cairo Yacht Club under his personal coach Ibrahim Ismail, and has also represented Egypt for the first time in sailing history at the 2012 Summer Olympics. As of September 2013, he is ranked no. 112 in the world for the sailboard class by the International Sailing Federation.

Habash competed in the men's RS:X class at the 2012 Summer Olympics in London by receiving an allocated place from ISAF. Struggling to attain a top position in the opening races, Habash accumulated a net score of 334 for a last place finish in a fleet of thirty-eight windsurfers.
