= Amgad Hosen =

Egyptian sports shooter

Personal information
- Born: 23 October 1975 (age 50) Libya

Sport
- Sport: Sports shooting

Amgad Hosen (born 23 October 1975) is an Egyptian sports shooter. He competed in the Men's 10 metre air rifle event at the 2012 Summer Olympics.
