= Anas Mostafa =

Egyptian fencer

Anas Mostafa is an Egyptian fencer. At the 2012 Summer Olympics he competed in the Men's foil, but was defeated in the first round.
