= Mostafa Mansour =

Egyptian canoeist

Mostafa Mansour (born 4 March 1989, Giza) is an Egyptian sprint canoeist. At the 2012 Summer Olympics, he was the first Egyptian sprint canoeist who qualified to Olympics in the history. He competed in the Men's K-1 200 and 1000 metres, finishing seventh in both of his heats.

biological information
