= Mostafa Hamdy =

Egyptian sport shooter

Mostafa Hamdy (Egyptian Arabic: مصطفى حمدى; born 18 January 1972 in Cairo) is an Egyptian sport shooter. He competed in the men's skeet event at the Summer Olympics in 1996, 2000, 2004, 2012, and 2020.

== Olympic results ==
Event	1996	2000	2004	2012	2020
Skeet (men)	T-49th	T-32nd	T-29th	18th	29th
