= Fateh Ziadi =

Algerian sport shooter

Fateh Ziadi (born October 26, 1976) is an Algerian sport shooter who competes in the men's 10 metre air pistol. At the 2012 Summer Olympics, he finished 43rd in the qualifying round, failing to make the cut for the final.
