= Karim Wagih =

Egyptian sport shooter

Karim Wagih is an Egyptian sport shooter who competes in the men's 10 metre air pistol. At the 2012 Summer Olympics, he finished 38th in the qualifying round, failing to make the cut for the final.
