= Nada Kamel =

Egyptian archer (born 1990)

Nada Kamel (born 27 August 1990 in Cairo, Egypt) is an Egyptian archer. She competed in the individual event at the 2012 Summer Olympics, coming in tied for 33rd.
