= Nourhan Amer =

Egyptian sports shooter

Personal information
- Born: 10 May 1993 (age 33) Egypt

Sport
- Sport: Sports shooting

Nourhan Muhammad Mahmud Amer (born 10 May 1993) is an Egyptian sports shooter. She competed in the Women's 10 metre air rifle event at the 2012 Summer Olympics.
