= Ahmed El-Nemr =

Egyptian archer (born 1978)

Ahmed El-Nemr (born 21 November 1978 in Cairo, Egypt) is an Egyptian archer. He competed in the individual event at the London 2012 Summer Olympics and the Rio 2016 Summer Olympics.
