= Brazil at the 2000 Summer Olympics =

- IOC code: BRA
- NOC: Brazilian Olympic Committee
- Website: www.cob.org.br (in Portuguese)

in Sydney
- Competitors: 198 (106 men, 92 women) in 23 sports
- Flag bearer: Sandra Pires
- Medals Ranked 53rd: Gold 0 Silver 6 Bronze 6 Total 12

Summer Olympics appearances (overview)
- 1920; 1924; 1928; 1932; 1936; 1948; 1952; 1956; 1960; 1964; 1968; 1972; 1976; 1980; 1984; 1988; 1992; 1996; 2000; 2004; 2008; 2012; 2016; 2020; 2024; 2028

Brazil competed at the 2000 Summer Olympics in Sydney, Australia. Brazilian athletes won twelve medals: six silver and six bronze, in the first Summer Olympics edition without a gold medal since the 1976 Summer Olympics. The 205 competitors, 111 men and 94 women, took part in 96 events in 23 sports.

== Summary ==
At the Judo competitions, two silver medals were obtained. Tiago Camilo lost in the final against Italian Giuseppe Maddaloni in men's 73 kg. Carlos Honorato lost the final of the men's 90 kg to Mark Huizinga from the Netherlands.

Brazilians sailors conquered two medals in Sailing. Current Olympic champion Robert Scheidt was silver medalist in the Laser class after a very tough competition against British gold medalist Ben Ainslie. The 1996 Olympic champions Torben Grael and Marcelo Ferreira were bronze medalists in Star class. It was Grael's fourth of five Olympic medals.

Brazil obtained four of those medals in Volleyball (three of them in beach volleyball and one indoor). Adriana Behar and Shelda Bede were silver medalists in Women's beach volleyball. They were current world champions and lost the gold medal match to Natalie Cook and Kerri Pottharst from Australia. Also in the women's competition, Brazilians Adriana Samuel and Sandra Pires were the bronze medalists. Zé Marco de Melo and Ricardo Santos were silver medalists of the men's beach volleyball competition losing the gold medal match to Americans Dain Blanton and Eric Fonoimoana. The indoor medal was the bronze conquered by Brazil women's national volleyball team, repeating the same result of the 1996 Summer Olympics, in a match of 3 sets to 0 against United States.

The bronze medal obtained by equestrians Luiz Felipe de Azevedo, André Johannpeter, Alvaro Miranda Neto and Rodrigo Pessoa in team jumping was the same result of the 1996 Olympics and with the same team.

The swimmers Fernando Scherer, Gustavo Borges, Carlos Jayme and Edvaldo Valério conquered the bronze medal in men's 4 × 100 metre freestyle relay. It was Gustavo Borges' fourth Olympic medal, a record number among Brazilian swimmers.

Brazil women's national basketball team won the bronze medal in a match decided in extra-time against South Korea.

At the Athletics competition a silver medal was obtained in men's 4 × 100 metres relay, by sprinters Vicente de Lima, Édson Ribeiro, André da Silva and Claudinei da Silva. Cláudio Roberto Souza was also awarded a silver medal in the event because he took part in the relay in the heats.

== Medalists ==
Medal	Name	Sport	Event	Date
Silver	Tiago Camilo	Judo	Men's 73 kg	18 September
Silver	Carlos Honorato	Judo	Men's 90 kg	20 September
Silver	Adriana Behar; Shelda Bede	Volleyball	Women's beach volleyball	25 September
Silver	Zé Marco de Melo; Ricardo Santos	Volleyball	Men's beach volleyball	26 September
Silver	Robert Scheidt	Sailing	Laser class	29 September
Silver	Vicente de Lima; Édson Ribeiro; André da Silva; Claudinei da Silva; Cláudio Roberto Souza (Note: Indicates the athlete competed in preliminaries but not the final.)	Athletics	Men's 4 × 100 metres relay	30 September
Bronze	Fernando Scherer; Gustavo Borges; Carlos Jayme; Edvaldo Valério	Swimming	Men's 4 × 100 metre freestyle relay	16 September
Bronze	Adriana Samuel; Sandra Pires	Volleyball	Women's beach volleyball	25 September
Bronze	Luiz Felipe de Azevedo; André Johannpeter; Alvaro Miranda Neto; Rodrigo Pessoa	Equestrian	Team jumping	28 September
Bronze	Torben Grael; Marcelo Ferreira	Sailing	Star class	30 September
Bronze	Brazil women's national volleyball team: Leila Barros; Erika Coimbra; Janina Conceição; Virna Dias; Kely Fraga; Ricarda Lima; Kátia Lopes; Elisângela Oliveira; Walewska Oliveira; Karin Rodrigues; Raquel Silva; Hélia Souza	Volleyball	Women's tournament	30 September
Bronze	Brazil women's national basketball team: Janeth Arcain; Ilisaine David; Lilian Gonçalves; Helen Luz; Silvia Andrea Santos Luz; Claudia Neves; Alessandra Oliveira; Adriana Pinto; Adriana Santos; Cintia Santos; Kelly Santos; Marta Sobral	Basketball	Women's tournament	30 September

Medals by sport
Sport	1st place, gold medalist(s)	2nd place, silver medalist(s)	3rd place, bronze medalist(s)	Total
Volleyball	0	2	2	4
Judo	0	2	0	2
Sailing	0	1	1	2
Athletics	0	1	0	1
Swimming	0	0	1	1
Basketball	0	0	1	1
Equestrian	0	0	1	1
Total	0	6	6	12

Medals by date
Date	1st place, gold medalist(s)	2nd place, silver medalist(s)	3rd place, bronze medalist(s)	Total
16 Sep	0	0	1	1
17 Sep	0	0	0	0
18 Sep	0	1	0	1
19 Sep	0	0	0	0
20 Sep	0	1	0	1
21 Sep	0	0	0	0
22 Sep	0	0	0	0
23 Sep	0	0	0	0
24 Sep	0	0	0	0
25 Sep	0	1	1	2
26 Sep	0	1	0	1
27 Sep	0	0	0	0
28 Sep	0	0	1	1
29 Sep	0	1	0	1
30 Sep	0	1	3	4
1 Oct	0	0	0	0
Total	0	6	6	12

Medals by gender
Gender	1st place, gold medalist(s)	2nd place, silver medalist(s)	3rd place, bronze medalist(s)	Total
Male	0	5	2	7
Female	0	1	3	4
Mixed/Open (Note: Medals won in Equestrian are considered an open event because men and women compete together.)	0	0	1	1
Total	0	6	6	12

== Competitors ==
The following is the list of number of competitors in the Games.

Sport	Men	Women	Total
Athletics	15	3	18
Basketball	0	12	12
Beach volleyball	4	4	8
Boxing	6	–	6
Canoeing	4	0	4
Cycling	2	2	4
Diving	1	1	2
Equestrian	11	0	11
Fencing	1	0	1
Football	16	17	33
Gymnastics	0	8	8
Handball	0	14	14
Judo	7	5	12
Rowing	1	0	1
Sailing	9	3	12
Swimming	10	1	11
Synchronized swimming	–	2	2
Table tennis	2	1	3
Taekwondo	0	1	1
Tennis	2	2	4
Triathlon	3	3	6
Volleyball	12	12	24
Weightlifting	0	1	1
Total	106	92	198

== Athletics ==
Key

- Note–Ranks given for track events are within the athlete's heat only
- Q = Qualified for the next round
- q = Qualified for the next round as a fastest loser or, in field events, by position without achieving the qualifying target
- NR = National record
- N/A = Round not applicable for the event
- Bye = Athlete not required to compete in round

Men
Track and road events

Athletes	Events	Heat round 1		Heat round 2		Semifinal		Final	
Athletes	Events	Time	Rank	Time	Rank	Time	Rank	Time	Rank
Vicente de Lima	100 metres	10.31	10 Q	10.28	22	Did not advance			
Raphael de Oliveira	100 metres	10.44	44	Did not advance					
Cláudio Sousa	100 metres	10.31	10 q	10.47	35	Did not advance			
André da Silva	200 metres	20.95	34	Did not advance					
Claudinei da Silva	200 metres	20.70	13 Q	20.24	6 Q	20.30	7 Q	20.28	6
Sanderlei Parrela	400 metres	45.55	13 Q	45.55	16 Q	45.17	4 Q	45.01	4
Osmar dos Santos	800 metres	1:47.05	14 q	—N/a		1:47.68	20	Did not advance	
Hudson de Souza	1500 metres	3:39.70	17 q	—N/a		3:41.00	17	Did not advance	
Éder Fialho	Marathon	—N/a						Did not finish	
Vanderlei de Lima	Marathon	—N/a						2:37:08	75
Osmiro Silva	Marathon	—N/a						Did not finish	
Márcio de Souza	110 metres hurdles	13.70	20 q	13.71	18	Did not advance			
Eronilde de Araújo	400 metres hurdles	50.06	18 Q	—N/a		48.76	8 Q	48.34	5
Vicente de Lima; Édson Ribeiro; André da Silva; Claudinei da Silva; Cláudio Souza	4 × 100 metres relay	38.32	2 Q	—N/a		38.27	3 Q	37.90	2nd place, silver medalist(s)

Field events

Athlete	Event	Qualification		Final	
Athlete	Event	Distance	Position	Distance	Position
Nélson Ferreira Júnior	Long jump	7.32	43	Did not advance	

Women
Field events

Athlete	Event	Qualification		Final	
Athlete	Event	Distance	Position	Distance	Position
Maurren Maggi	Long jump	6.35	24	Did not advance	
Luciana dos Santos	Long jump	no mark		Did not advance	
Luciana dos Santos	Triple jump	13.48	24	Did not advance	
Sueli dos Santos	Javelin throw	56.27	23	Did not advance	

== Basketball ==
=== Women's tournament ===
- Team roster
  - Adriana Aparecida dos Santos
  - Adrianinha
  - Alessandra Santos de Oliveira
  - Cíntia Tuiú
  - Claudinha
  - Helen Cristina Santos Luz
  - Zaine
  - Janeth dos Santos Arcain
  - Kelly da Silva Santos
  - Lílian Cristina Lopes Gonçalves
  - Marta de Souza Sobral
  - Silvinha

Group play

Team	W	L	PF	PA	PD	Pts	Tie
Australia	5	0	394	274	+120	10	
France	4	1	338	287	+51	9	
Brazil	2	3	358	353	+5	7	1.12
Slovakia	2	3	294	282	+12	7	0.97
Canada	2	3	313	317	−4	7	0.91
Senegal	0	5	199	383	−184	5	

16 September
11:30

Brazil	76–60	Slovakia

The Dome, Sydney

18 September
21:30

Australia	81–70	Brazil

The Dome, Sydney

20 September
14:30

Brazil	82–48	Senegal

The Dome, Sydney

22 September
14:30

France	73–70 (OT)	Brazil

The Dome, Sydney

24 September
21:30

Canada	61–60	Brazil

The Dome, Sydney

Quarterfinal

27 September
17:00

Report

Russia	67–68	Brazil
Scoring by half: 39–38, 28–30
Pts: Pshikova 18; Rebs: Zasulskaya 6 Asts: Zasulskaya 5		Pts: de Oliveira 17; Rebs: Arcain 9 Asts: Neves, Luz 4 each

The Dome, Sydney
Attendance: 14,381

Semifinal

29 September
21:30

Australia	64–52	Brazil

The Dome, Sydney

Bronze medal match

30 September
11:00

South Korea	73–84	Brazil (bronze)

The Dome, Sydney
Attendance: 14,833

== Boxing ==
Athlete	Event	Round of 32	Round of 16	Quarterfinals	Semifinals	Final	
Athlete	Event	Opposition Result	Opposition Result	Opposition Result	Opposition Result	Opposition Result	Rank
José Albuquerque	Light flyweight	Sydorenko (UKR); L 7–12	Did not advance				
Valdemir Pereira	Featherweight	Swan (AUS); W 8–4	Paliani (TUR); L RSC–R3	Did not advance			
Agnaldo Nunes	Lightweight	Katsidis (AUS); L 6–15	Did not advance				
Kelson Pinto	Light welterweight	Shabbir (PAK); W RSC–R4	Abdullaev (UZB); L RSC–R4	Did not advance			
Cleiton Conceição	Middleweight	Lacy (USA); L RSC–R3	Did not advance				
Laudelino Barros	Light heavyweight	Green (AUS); L RSC–R4	Did not advance				

== Canoeing ==
=== Slalom ===
Athlete	Event	Preliminary						Final					
Athlete	Event	Run 1	Rank	Run 2	Rank	Total	Rank	Run 1	Rank	Run 2	Rank	Total	Rank
Cássio Petry	Men's C-1	145.63	14	148.09	14	293.72	14	Did not advance					

=== Sprint ===
Men

Athlete	Event	Heats		Semifinals		Final	
Athlete	Event	Time	Rank	Time	Rank	Time	Rank
Roger Caumo	K-1 500 m	1:49.955	8	Did not advance			
Roger Caumo	K-1 1000 m	3:52.082	8	Did not advance			
Carlos Campos; Sebastián Cuattrin	K-2 500 m	1:35.662	7 q	1:45.868	8	Did not advance	
Carlos Campos; Sebastián Cuattrin	K-2 1000 m	3:21.228	7 q	3:22.496	6	Did not advance	

== Cycling ==
=== Road ===
Men

Athlete	Event	Time	Rank
Murilo Fischer	Road race	5:52:47	88

Women

Athlete	Event	Time	Rank
Janildes Fernandes	Road race	3:35:12	49
Cláudia Saintagne	Road race	3:24:19	44

=== Mountain biking ===
Athlete	Event	Time	Rank
Renato Seabra	Men's cross-country	Did not finish	

== Diving ==
Men

Athlete	Event	Preliminary		Semifinal				Final		Total	
Athlete	Event	Points	Rank	Points	Rank	Total	Rank	Points	Rank	Points	Rank
Cassius Duran	3 m springboard	382.08	14 Q	216.06	13	598.14	14	Did not advance			
Cassius Duran	10 m platform	331.86	28	Did not advance							

Women

Athlete	Event	Preliminary		Semifinal				Final		Total	
Athlete	Event	Points	Rank	Points	Rank	Total	Rank	Points	Rank	Points	Rank
Juliana Veloso	3 m springboard	220.62	35	Did not advance							
Juliana Veloso	10 m platform	266.04	19	Did not advance							

== Equestrianism ==
Dressage

Athlete	Horse	Event	Grand Prix Test		Grand Prix Special			Grand Prix Freestyle		Total	
Athlete	Horse	Event	Score	Rank	Score	Total	Rank	Score	Rank	Score	Rank
Jorge da Rocha	Quixote Lanciano 13	Individual	54.00	47	Did not advance						

Eventing

Athlete	Horse	Event	Dressage		Cross-country		Show jumping		Total	
Athlete	Horse	Event	Penalties	Rank	Penalties	Rank	Penalties	Rank	Penalties	Rank
Roberto de Macedo	HC Fricote	Individual	93.20	38	Did not finish		Did not advance			
Carlos Parro	CDC Feline	Individual	81.60	36	19.20	17	47.00	23	147.80	21
Vicente de Araújo Neto; Guto de Faria; Serguei Fofanoff; Éder Gustavo Pagoto	Teveri; Hunefer; Sanderston; Amazonian Do Feroleto	Team	215.00	12	36.00	5	43.00	6	333.00	6

Jumping

Athlete	Horse	Event	Qualification								Final				Total	
Athlete	Horse	Event	Round 1		Round 2			Round 3			Round A		Round B		Total	
Athlete	Horse	Event	Penalties	Rank	Penalties	Total	Rank	Penalties	Total	Rank	Penalties	Rank	Penalties	Rank	Penalties	Rank
Luiz Felipe de Azevedo	Ralph 12	Individual	4.75	=9	0.00	4.75	1	8.00	12.75	6 Q	16.00	=33	Did not advance			
André Johannpeter	Calei	Individual	5.25	=13	8.00	13.25	=17	16.00	29.25	=34 q	4.00	=5 Q	4.00	=5	8.00	=4
Álvaro de Miranda Neto	Aspen	Individual	24.75	=66	4.00	28.75	53	12.00	40.75	51	Did not advance					
Rodrigo Pessoa	Baloubet du Rouet	Individual	5.00	=11	0.00	5.00	2	0.00	5.00	1 Q	0.00	=1 Q	DNF		DNF	
Luiz Felipe de Azevedo; André Johannpeter; Álvaro de Miranda Neto; Rodrigo Pessoa	See above	Team	—N/a		12.00	—N/a	=4 Q	12.00	24.00	3	—N/a				24.00	3rd place, bronze medalist(s)

== Fencing ==
One male fencer represented Brazil in 2000.

Men

Athlete	Event	Round of 64	Round of 32	Round of 16	Quarterfinal	Semifinal	Final / BM	
Athlete	Event	Opposition Result	Opposition Result	Opposition Result	Opposition Result	Opposition Result	Opposition Result	Rank
Marco Martins	Individual foil	Beevers (GBR); L 7–15	Did not advance					37

== Football ==
Summary

Team	Event	Group stage				Quarterfinal	Semifinal	Final / BM	
Team	Event	Opposition Score	Opposition Score	Opposition Score	Rank	Opposition Score	Opposition Score	Opposition Score	Rank
Brazil men	Men's tournament	Slovakia; W 3–1	South Africa; L 1–3	Japan; W 1–0	1 Q	Cameroon; L 1–2	Did not advance		7
Brazil women	Women's tournament	Sweden; W 2–0	Germany; L 1–2	Australia; W 2–1	2 Q	—N/a	United States; L 0–1	Germany; L 0–2	4

=== Men's tournament ===
Roster

Head coach: Vanderlei Luxemburgo

No.	Pos.	Player	Date of birth (age)	Caps	Club
1	GK	Helton	18 May 1978 (aged 22)		(Brazil) Vasco da Gama
2	DF	Baiano	28 June 1978 (aged 22)		(Brazil) Santos
3	DF	Fábio Bilica	4 January 1979 (aged 21)		(Italy) Venezia
4	DF	Álvaro	1 November 1977 (aged 22)		(Brazil) São Paulo
5	MF	Marcos Paulo	11 May 1977 (aged 23)		(Brazil) Cruzeiro
6	DF	Fábio Aurélio	24 September 1979 (aged 20)		(Brazil) São Paulo
7	FW	Ronaldinho	21 March 1980 (aged 20)		(Brazil) Grêmio
8	MF	Fabiano	6 April 1978 (aged 22)		(Brazil) São Paulo
9	MF	Edu	10 January 1979 (aged 21)		(Brazil) São Paulo
10	MF	Alex	14 September 1977 (aged 22)		(Italy) Parma
11	FW	Geovanni	11 January 1980 (aged 20)		(Brazil) Cruzeiro
12	MF	Roger	17 August 1978 (aged 22)		(Brazil) Fluminense
13	DF	André Luís	31 July 1979 (aged 21)		(Brazil) Santos
14	DF	Lúcio	8 May 1978 (aged 22)		(Brazil) Internacional
15	MF	Mozart	8 November 1979 (aged 20)		(Brazil) Flamengo
16	DF	Athirson	16 January 1977 (aged 23)		(Brazil) Flamengo
17	FW	Lucas	3 January 1979 (aged 21)		(France) Rennes
18	GK	Fábio Costa	27 November 1977 (aged 22)		(Brazil) Santos

- Stand-by players

No.	Pos.	Player	Date of birth (age)	Caps	Club
19	DF	Flávio	12 March 1980 (aged 20)		(Brazil) Fluminense
20	MF	Alexandre	19 February 1979 (aged 21)		(Brazil) São Paulo
21	FW	Leandro	6 August 1977 (aged 23)		(Italy) Fiorentina
22	GK	Júlio César	3 September 1979 (aged 21)		(Brazil) Flamengo

Group play

Team	Pld	W	D	L	GF	GA	GD	Pts
Brazil	3	2	0	1	5	4	+1	6
Japan	3	2	0	1	4	3	+1	6
South Africa	3	1	0	2	5	5	0	3
Slovakia	3	1	0	2	4	6	−2	3

14 September 2000
19:00

Brazil	3–1	Slovakia
Edu 30'; Čišovský 68' (o.g.); Alex 90+1'	Report	Porázik 26'

Brisbane Cricket Ground, Brisbane
Attendance: 24,616
Referee: Simon Micallef (Australia)

17 September 2000
19:00

Brazil	1–3	South Africa
Edu 11'	Report	Fortune 10'; Nomvethe 74'; Lekoelea 90'

Brisbane Cricket Ground, Brisbane
Attendance: 36,326
Referee: Bruce Grimshaw (New Zealand)

20 September 2000
19:00

Brazil	1–0	Japan
Alex 5'	Report

Brisbane Cricket Ground, Brisbane
Attendance: 36,608
Referee: Stéphane Bré (France)

Quarterfinal

23 September 2000
19:00

Brazil	1–2 (a.e.t./g.g.)	Cameroon
Ronaldinho 90+4'	Report	M'Boma 17'; M'Bami 113'

The Gabba, Brisbane
Attendance: 37,332
Referee: Herbert Fandel (Germany)

=== Women's tournament ===
Head coach: José Duarte

Brazil named a squad of 18 players and 4 alternates for the tournament.

No.	Pos.	Player	Date of birth (age)	Caps	Goals	Club
1	GK	Andréia	14 September 1977 (aged 22)			
2	DF	Nenê	31 March 1976 (aged 24)			
3	DF	Juliana	3 October 1981 (aged 18)			
4	DF	Mônica	4 April 1978 (aged 22)			
5	MF	Daniela	12 January 1984 (aged 16)			
6	DF	Tânia	3 October 1974 (aged 25)			
7	MF	Formiga	3 March 1978 (aged 22)			
8	MF	Cidinha	6 October 1976 (aged 23)			
9	FW	Kátia	18 February 1977 (aged 23)			
10	MF	Sissi (captain)	2 June 1967 (aged 33)			
11	FW	Roseli	7 September 1969 (aged 31)			
12	FW	Pretinha	19 May 1975 (aged 25)			
13	FW	Maycon	30 April 1977 (aged 23)			
14	MF	Raquel	10 May 1978 (aged 22)			
15	DF	Simone	10 February 1981 (aged 19)			
16	DF	Rosana	7 July 1982 (aged 18)			
17	MF	Suzana	12 October 1973 (aged 26)			
18	GK	Maravilha	10 April 1973 (aged 27)			

Unenrolled alternate players
No.	Pos.	Player	Date of birth (age)	Caps	Goals	Club
19	MF	Marisa	10 August 1966 (aged 34)			
20	GK	Mayla	25 August 1982 (aged 18)			
21	FW	Grazielle	28 March 1981 (aged 19)			
22	FW	Nilda	25 March 1972 (aged 28)			

Group play

Team	Pld	W	D	L	GF	GA	GD	Pts
Germany	3	3	0	0	6	1	+5	9
Brazil	3	2	0	1	5	3	+2	6
Sweden	3	0	1	2	1	4	−3	1
Australia	3	0	1	2	2	6	−4	1

13 September 2000
17:00

Sweden	0–2	Brazil
	Report	Pretinha 21'; Kátia 70'

Melbourne Cricket Ground, Melbourne
Attendance: 58,432
Referee: Sandra Hunt (United States)

16 September 2000
17:30

Germany	2–1	Brazil
Prinz 33', 41'	Report	Raquel 72'

Bruce Stadium, Canberra
Attendance: 17,000
Referee: Martha Toro (Colombia)

19 September 2000
17:30

Australia	1–2	Brazil
Hughes 33'	Report	Raquel 56'; Kátia 64'

Sydney Football Stadium, Sydney
Attendance: 29,400
Referee: Vibeke Karlsen (Norway)

Semifinal

24 September 2000
17:30

United States	1–0	Brazil
Hamm 60'	Report

Bruce Stadium, Canberra
Attendance: 11,000
Referee: Nicole Petignat (Switzerland)

Bronze medal match

28 September 2000
17:00

Germany	2–0	Brazil
Lingor 64'; Prinz 79'	Report

Sydney Football Stadium, Sydney
Attendance: 11,200
Referee: Im Eun Ju (South Korea)

== Gymnastics ==
=== Artistic ===
Women

Athlete	Event	Qualification						Final					
Athlete	Event	Apparatus				Total	Rank	Apparatus				Total	Rank
Athlete	Event	V	UB	BB	F	Total	Rank	V	UB	BB	F	Total	Rank
Camila Comin	All-around	9.112	9.450	9.200	8.562	36.324	48	Did not qualify					
Daniele Hypólito	All-around	9.325	9.062	9.462	9.262	37.111	33 Q	8.962	9.600	9.325	9.450	37.337	20

=== Rhythmic ===
Athlete	Event	Qualification				Final			
Athlete	Event	5 clubs	3 ribbons 2 hoops	Total	Rank	5 clubs	3 ribbons 2 hoops	Total	Rank
Camila Ferezin; Natália Scherer; Flávia de Faria; Alessandra Ferezin; Thalita Nakadomari; Dayane Camilo	Team	19.150	19.066	38.216	7 Q	19.066	19.200	38.266	8

== Handball ==
Summary

Key:

- ET: After Extra Time
- P – Match decided by penalty-shootout.

Team	Event	Group stage					Quarterfinal	Semifinal	Final / BM	
Team	Event	Opposition Score	Opposition Score	Opposition Score	Opposition Score	Rank	Opposition Score	Opposition Score	Opposition Score	Rank
Brazil women's	Women's tournament	Australia; W 32–19	Austria; L 26–45	Norway; L 16–30	Denmark; L 26–39	4 Q	South Korea; L 24–35	Classification match France; L 23–32	7th place match Romania; L 33–38	8

Team roster

- Alessandra Medeiros da Oliveira
- Aline Silva
- Chana Masson
- Dilane Roese
- Idalina Mesquita
- Lucila Vianna da Silva
- Meg Montão
- Margarida Conte
- Maria José Batista de Sales
- Rosana de Aleluia
- Sandra de Oliveira
- Valéria de Oliveira
- Viviane Jacques
- Viviani Emerick

Group play

17 September 2000; 19:30	Australia	19–32	Brazil	Pavilion 2, Sydney; Referees: Marić, Gardinovački (FRY)
17 September 2000; 19:30	Edland, Kahmke 4	(7–15)	Roese, L. Silva 6	Pavilion 2, Sydney; Referees: Marić, Gardinovački (FRY)
17 September 2000; 19:30	3× (yellow card) 4× (suspension)		3× (yellow card) 4× (suspension)	Pavilion 2, Sydney; Referees: Marić, Gardinovački (FRY)

21 September 2000; 14:30	Brazil	26–45	Austria	Pavilion 2, Sydney; Referees: Salim, Hassan (EGY)
21 September 2000; 14:30	L. Silva 8	(14–21)	Fridrikas 11	Pavilion 2, Sydney; Referees: Salim, Hassan (EGY)
21 September 2000; 14:30	3× (yellow card) 7× (suspension)		3× (yellow card) 2× (suspension)	Pavilion 2, Sydney; Referees: Salim, Hassan (EGY)

23 September 2000; 16:30	Brazil	16–30	Norway	Pavilion 2, Sydney; Referees: Chung, Lim (KOR)
23 September 2000; 16:30	S. Oliveira 4	(7–18)	Grini 7	Pavilion 2, Sydney; Referees: Chung, Lim (KOR)
23 September 2000; 16:30	2× (yellow card) 5× (suspension)		3× (yellow card) 1× (suspension)	Pavilion 2, Sydney; Referees: Chung, Lim (KOR)

25 September 2000; 14:30	Denmark	39–26	Brazil	Pavilion 2, Sydney; Referees: Bojsen, Anusic (USA)
25 September 2000; 14:30	Kiærskou 9	(19–12)	Sales 9	Pavilion 2, Sydney; Referees: Bojsen, Anusic (USA)
25 September 2000; 14:30	3× (yellow card) 1× (suspension)		3× (yellow card) 4× (suspension)	Pavilion 2, Sydney; Referees: Bojsen, Anusic (USA)

Quarterfinal

28 September 2000; 14:30	South Korea	35–24	Brazil	The Dome, Sydney; Referees: Klucsó, Lekrinszky (HUN)
28 September 2000; 14:30	Kim H. 9	(19–12)	Sales 8	The Dome, Sydney; Referees: Klucsó, Lekrinszky (HUN)
28 September 2000; 14:30	3× (yellow card) 2× (suspension)		2× (yellow card) 4× (suspension)	The Dome, Sydney; Referees: Klucsó, Lekrinszky (HUN)

5th-8th place classification match

30 September 2000; 09:30	Brazil	23–32	France	The Dome, Sydney; Referees: Kalin, Korić (SLO)
30 September 2000; 09:30	A. Silva 9	(9–16)	Pecqueux-Rolland 12	The Dome, Sydney; Referees: Kalin, Korić (SLO)
30 September 2000; 09:30	3× (yellow card) 2× (suspension)		2× (yellow card) 5× (suspension)	The Dome, Sydney; Referees: Kalin, Korić (SLO)

7th place match

1 October 2000
09:30
Brazil
33–38 (ET)
Romania
The Dome, Sydney
Referees: Klucsó, Lekrinszky (HUN)
Sales 9
(15–17)
Tănase 11
3× (yellow card) 4× (suspension)

3× (yellow card) 1× (suspension)

FT: 32–32 ET: 1–6

== Sailing ==
Nine men and three women competed in the eight events in the Sailing competition in Sydney.

Men's Mistral

- Ricardo Santos
  1. Race 1 – 5
  2. Race 2 – 10
  3. Race 3 – 21
  4. Race 4 – 12
  5. Race 5 – 22
  6. Race 6 – 4
  7. Race 7 – 8
  8. Race 8 – 14
  9. Race 9 – (37) OCS
  10. Race 10 – 21
  11. Race 11 – 26
  12. Final – 117 (15th place)

Men's single-handed dinghy (Finn)

- Christoph Bergmann
  1. Race 1 – 10
  2. Race 2 – 8
  3. Race 3 – 3
  4. Race 4 – (21)
  5. Race 5 – 11
  6. Race 6 – 13
  7. Race 7 – 9
  8. Race 8 – 2
  9. Race 9 – 18
  10. Race 10 – (20)
  11. Race 11 – 10
  12. Final – 84 (11th place)

Men's double-handed dinghy (470)

- Andre Fonseca and Alexandre Paradeda
  1. Race 1 – 14
  2. Race 2 – (24)
  3. Race 3 – 11
  4. Race 4 – 21
  5. Race 5 – 15
  6. Race 6 – 20
  7. Race 7 – (27)
  8. Race 8 – 24
  9. Race 9 – 22
  10. Race 10 – 21
  11. Race 11 – 23
  12. Final – 171 (26th place)

Men's Laser

- Robert Scheidt
  1. Race 1 – 1
  2. Race 2 – 2
  3. Race 3 – (22)
  4. Race 4 – 1
  5. Race 5 – 12
  6. Race 6 – 1
  7. Race 7 – 20
  8. Race 8 – 5
  9. Race 9 – 1
  10. Race 10 – 1
  11. Race 11 – (44) DSQ
  12. Final – 44 (silver medal)

Men's Tornado

- Henrique Pellicano and Mauricio Oliveira
  1. Race 1 – (17) OCS
  2. Race 2 – 7
  3. Race 3 – 6
  4. Race 4 – 9
  5. Race 5 – 16
  6. Race 6 – 13
  7. Race 7 – (17) OCS
  8. Race 8 – 5
  9. Race 9 – 6
  10. Race 10 – 5
  11. Race 11 – 11
  12. Final – 78 (11th place)

Men's two-handed keelboat (Star)

- Marcelo Ferreira and Torben Grael
  1. Race 1 – 3
  2. Race 2 – (13)
  3. Race 3 – 1
  4. Race 4 – 2
  5. Race 5 – 1
  6. Race 6 – 6
  7. Race 7 – 7
  8. Race 8 – 4
  9. Race 9 – 12
  10. Race 10 – 3
  11. Race 11 – (17) OCS
  12. Final – 39 (bronze medal)

Women's Mistral

- Christina Forte
  1. Race 1 – 24
  2. Race 2 – 22
  3. Race 3 – (27)
  4. Race 4 – 26
  5. Race 5 – 24
  6. Race 6 – (30) OCS
  7. Race 7 – 26
  8. Race 8 – 25
  9. Race 9 – 24
  10. Race 10 – 25
  11. Race 11 – 27
  12. Final – 223 (26th place)

Women's double-handed dinghy (470)

- Maria Krahe and Fernanda Oliveira
  1. Race 1 – 16
  2. Race 2 – 17
  3. Race 3 – 14
  4. Race 4 – 14
  5. Race 5 – 13
  6. Race 6 – (20) DSQ
  7. Race 7 – 17
  8. Race 8 – 15
  9. Race 9 – (20) OCS
  10. Race 10 – 19
  11. Race 11 – 18
  12. Final – 143 (19th place)

== Swimming ==
Men's 50m freestyle

- Fernando Scherer
  1. Preliminary heat – 22.88 (did not advance)
- Edvaldo Valério
  1. Preliminary heat – 22.96 (did not advance)

Men's 100m freestyle

- Fernando Scherer
  1. Preliminary heat – DNS (did not advance)
- Gustavo Borges
  1. Preliminary heat – 49.76
  2. Semi-final – 49.93 (did not advance)

Men's 200m freestyle

- Rodrigo Castro
  1. Preliminary heat – 1:53.65 (did not advance)

Men's 400m freestyle

- Luiz Lima
  1. Preliminary heat – 03:53.87 (did not advance)

Men's 1500m freestyle

- Luiz Lima
  1. Preliminary heat – 15:23.15 (did not advance)

Men's 100m breaststroke

- Eduardo Fischer
  1. Preliminary heat – 01:03.72 (did not advance)

Men's 100m backstroke

- Alexandre Massura
  1. Preliminary heat – 55.58
  2. Semi-final – 56.07 (did not advance)
- Rogério Romero
  1. Preliminary heat – 56.44 (did not advance)

Men's 200m backstroke

- Rogério Romero
  1. Preliminary heat – 02:00.48
  2. Semi-final – 01:59.69
  3. Final – 01:59.27 (7th place)
- Leonardo Costa
  1. Preliminary heat – 02:01.08
  2. Semi-final – 02:02.26 (did not advance)

Men's 4 × 100 m freestyle

- Fernando Scherer, Edvaldo Valério, Carlos Jayme, Gustavo Borges
  1. Preliminary heat – 03:19.29
  2. Final – 03:17.40 (bronze medal)

Men's 4 × 200 m freestyle

- Edvaldo Valério, Leonardo Costa, Luiz Lima, Rodrigo Castro
  1. Preliminary heat – 07:26.42 (did not advance)

Men's 4 × 100 m medley

- Alexandre Massura, Eduardo Fischer, Fernando Scherer, Gustavo Borges
  1. Preliminary heat – 03:42.31 (did not advance)

Women's 100m butterfly

- Fabíola Molina
  1. Preliminary heat – 01:02.77 (did not advance)

Women's 100m backstroke

- Fabíola Molina
  1. Preliminary heat – 01:03.68 (did not advance)

== Synchronized swimming ==
Women

Athlete	Event	Preliminary				Final			
Athlete	Event	Technical	Free	Total	Rank	Points	Rank	Total	Rank
Carolina Moraes; Isabela Moraes	Duet	31.593	59.280	90.873	12 Q	31.593	59.150	90.743	12

== Tennis ==
Athlete	Event	Round of 64	Round of 32	Round of 16	Quarterfinals	Semifinals	Final / BM	
Athlete	Event	Opposition Score	Opposition Score	Opposition Score	Opposition Score	Opposition Score	Opposition Score	Rank
Gustavo Kuerten	Men's singles	Pognon (BEN); W 6–1, 6–1	Schüttler (GER); W 6–4, 6–4	Ljubičić (CRO); W 7–6^{(7–2)}, 6–3	Kafelnikov (RUS); L 4–6, 7–5	Did not advance		
Gustavo Kuerten; Jaime Oncins	Men's doubles	—N/a	Lareau / Nestor (CAN); L 1–6, 4–6	Did not advance				
Joana Cortez; Vanessa Menga	Women's doubles	—N/a	N Li / T Li (CHN); W 6–4, 6–2	Mandula / Marosi-Aracama (HUN); L 2–6, 3–6	Did not advance			

== Triathlon ==
At the inaugural Olympic triathlon competition, Brazil was represented by three men and three women. Two of the Brazilian women did not finish, giving Brazil the distinction of being one of only two nations (along with Great Britain) to have multiple competitors not finish the race.

Men's individual competition:

- Leandro Macedo – 1:49:50.69 (→ 14th place)
- Juraci Moreira – 1:50:44.79 (→ 22nd place)
- Armando Barcellos – 1:53:42.63 (→ 39th place)

Women's individual competition:

- Sandra Soldan – 2:03:19.86 (→ 11th place)
- Mariana Ohata – DNF (→ no ranking)
- Carla Moreno – DNF (→ no ranking)

== Volleyball ==
=== Men's team competition ===
Pos	Team	Pld	W	L	Pts	SW	SL	SR	SPW	SPL	SPR	Qualification
1	Brazil	5	5	0	10	15	1	15.000	415	331	1.254	Quarterfinals
2	Netherlands	5	4	1	9	12	5	2.400	417	360	1.158	Quarterfinals
3	Cuba	5	3	2	8	9	7	1.286	383	335	1.143	Quarterfinals
4	Australia	5	2	3	7	6	10	0.600	327	374	0.874	Quarterfinals
5	Spain	5	1	4	6	7	12	0.583	404	444	0.910	
6	Egypt	5	0	5	5	1	15	0.067	309	411	0.752	

- Preliminary round (group A)
  - Defeated Australia (3–0)
  - Defeated Egypt (3–0)
  - Defeated Netherlands (3–0)
  - Defeated Spain (3–1)
  - Defeated Cuba (3–0)
- Quarterfinals
  - Lost to Argentina (1–3)
- Classification matches
  - 5th/8th place: defeated Cuba (3–2)
  - 5th/6th place: lost to Netherlands (0–3) → sixth place
- Team roster
  - André Heller
  - Dante Amaral
  - Douglas Chiarotti
  - Gilberto Godoy Filho
  - Giovane Gávio
  - Gustavo Endres
  - Gilmar Teixeira
  - Marcelo Elgarten
  - Maurício Lima
  - Max Pereira
  - Nalbert Bitencourt
  - Alexandre Samuel
- Head coach: Radamés Lattari Filho

=== Women's team competition ===
Pos	Team	Pld	W	L	Pts	SW	SL	SR	SPW	SPL	SPR	Qualification
1	Brazil	5	5	0	10	15	1	15.000	395	272	1.452	Quarterfinals
2	United States	5	4	1	9	13	4	3.250	392	306	1.281	Quarterfinals
3	Croatia	5	3	2	8	9	9	1.000	411	389	1.057	Quarterfinals
4	China	5	2	3	7	8	9	0.889	371	365	1.016	Quarterfinals
5	Australia	5	1	4	6	4	13	0.308	303	408	0.743	
6	Kenya	5	0	5	5	2	15	0.133	280	412	0.680	

- Preliminary round (group A)
  - Defeated Kenya (3–0)
  - Defeated Australia (3–0)
  - Defeated PR China (3–0)
  - Defeated Croatia (3–0)
  - Defeated United States (3–1)
- Quarterfinals
  - Defeated Germany (3–0)
- Semifinals
  - Lost to Cuba (2–3)
- Bronze-medal match
  - Defeated United States (3–0) → bronze medal
- Team roster
  - Elisângela Oliveira
  - Erika Coimbra
  - Hélia Souza
  - Janina Conceição
  - Karin Rodrigues
  - Kátia Lopes
  - Kely Fraga
  - Leila Barros
  - Raquel Silva
  - Ricarda Lima
  - Virna Dias
  - Walewska Oliveira
- Head coach: Bernardo Rezende

== See also ==
- Brazil at the 1999 Pan American Games

== Notes ==
- Wallechinsky, David (2004). The Complete Book of the Summer Olympics (Athens 2004 Edition). Toronto, Canada. ISBN 1-894963-32-6.
- International Olympic Committee (2001). The Results. Retrieved 12 November 2005.
- Sydney Organising Committee for the Olympic Games (2001). Official Report of the XXVII Olympiad Volume 1: Preparing for the Games. Retrieved 20 November 2005.
- Sydney Organising Committee for the Olympic Games (2001). Official Report of the XXVII Olympiad Volume 2: Celebrating the Games. Retrieved 20 November 2005.
- Sydney Organising Committee for the Olympic Games (2001). The Results. Retrieved 20 November 2005.
- International Olympic Committee Web Site
