= Volleyball at the 2000 Summer Olympics – Women's tournament =

Women's volleyball at the Games of the XXVII Olympiad
- Venue: Sydney Entertainment Centre; Sydney Showground Pavilion 4
- Date: 16–30 September
- Competitors: 144 from 12 nations

Medalists
1st place, gold medalist(s)		Cuba (3rd title)
2nd place, silver medalist(s)		Russia
3rd place, bronze medalist(s)		Brazil

The 2000 women's Olympic volleyball tournament was the tenth edition of the event, organised by the world's governing body, the FIVB in conjunction with the International Olympic Committee. It was held from 16 to 30 September 2000 in the Sydney Entertainment Centre in Darling Harbour.

== Qualification ==
Qualifiers	Date	Host	Vacancies	Qualified
Host country	24 September 1993	(Monaco) Monte Carlo	1	Australia
1999 Women's World Cup	2–16 November 1999	Japan	3	Cuba
1999 Women's World Cup	2–16 November 1999	Japan	3	Russia
1999 Women's World Cup	2–16 November 1999	Japan	3	Brazil
European Qualification	4–9 January 2000	(Germany) Bremen	1	Germany
North American Qualification	5–8 January 2000	(United States) Lakeland	1	United States
South American Qualification	4–6 January 2000	(Peru) Lima	1	Peru
African Qualification	16–20 January 2000	(Kenya) Nairobi	1	Kenya
Asian Qualification	17–25 June 2000	(Japan) Tokyo	1	South Korea
2000 Olympic Qualification Tournament	17–25 June 2000	(Japan) Tokyo	3	Italy
2000 Olympic Qualification Tournament	17–25 June 2000	(Japan) Tokyo	3	Croatia
2000 Olympic Qualification Tournament	17–25 June 2000	(Japan) Tokyo	3	China
Total			12	

== Format ==
The tournament was played in two different stages. In the Preliminary round (first stage), the twelve participants were divided into two pools of six teams. A single round-robin format was played within each pool to determine the teams position in the pool. The four highest ranked teams in each pool advanced to the Final round (second stage) and the two lowest ranked teams took no further participation (with pool places 5th and 6th being ranked in the final standings as joined 9th and 11th, respectively).

The Final round was played in a single elimination format, with placement matches determining the top eight positions. Starting at the quarterfinals, winners advanced to the semifinals while losers advanced to the placement matches (5th–8th semifinal).

== Pools composition ==
Teams were seeded following the Serpentine system according to their ranking as of January 2000.

Twelve qualified nations were drawn into two groups, each consisting of six teams. After a robin-round, the four highest-placed teams in each group advanced to a knock-out round to decide the medals.

Group A	Group B
Australia (Hosts)	Cuba (1)
Brazil (3)	Russia (2)
China (4)	South Korea (5)
United States (9)	Italy (8)
Croatia (10)	Germany (11)
Kenya (15)	Peru (12)

== Venues ==
- Sydney Entertainment Centre, Sydney, Australia
- Sydney Showground Pavilion 4, Sydney, Australia

== Preliminary round ==
- All times are Australian Eastern Standard Time (UTC+10:00).
- venues: Sydney Showground Pavilion 4 (matches starting at 12:00 or earlier) and Sydney Entertainment Centre (matches starting at 12:30 or later).

=== Pool A ===
Pos	Team	Pld	W	L	Pts	SW	SL	SR	SPW	SPL	SPR	Qualification
1	Brazil	5	5	0	10	15	1	15.000	395	272	1.452	Quarterfinals
2	United States	5	4	1	9	13	4	3.250	392	306	1.281	Quarterfinals
3	Croatia	5	3	2	8	9	9	1.000	411	389	1.057	Quarterfinals
4	China	5	2	3	7	8	9	0.889	371	365	1.016	Quarterfinals
5	Australia	5	1	4	6	4	13	0.308	303	408	0.743	
6	Kenya	5	0	5	5	2	15	0.133	280	412	0.680	

16 September 2000; 12:30	Brazil	3–0	Kenya	Sydney Entertainment Centre
16 September 2000; 12:30	(25–8, 25–11, 25–13); Report			Sydney Entertainment Centre

16 September 2000; 14:30	Croatia	3–1	Australia	Sydney Entertainment Centre
16 September 2000; 14:30	(25–21, 22–25, 25–14, 25–16); Report			Sydney Entertainment Centre

16 September 2000; 21:10	China	1–3	United States	Sydney Entertainment Centre; Attendance: 8,250; Referees: Klaus Fezer (Germany), Bela Hobor (Hungary)
16 September 2000; 21:10	(25–19, 21–25, 12–25 ,24–26); Report			Sydney Entertainment Centre; Attendance: 8,250; Referees: Klaus Fezer (Germany), Bela Hobor (Hungary)

18 September 2000; 12:00	China	1–3	Croatia	Sydney Showground Pavilion 4
18 September 2000; 12:00	(23–25, 28–26, 20–25, 15–25); Report			Sydney Showground Pavilion 4

18 September 2000; 14:30	United States	3–0	Kenya	Sydney Entertainment Centre; Attendance: 4,848; Referees: Ivan Golianski (Russia), Themistoklis Kalpaktsoglou (Greece)
18 September 2000; 14:30	(25–16, 25–6, 25–16); Report			Sydney Entertainment Centre; Attendance: 4,848; Referees: Ivan Golianski (Russia), Themistoklis Kalpaktsoglou (Greece)

18 September 2000; 18:20	Australia	0–3	Brazil	Sydney Entertainment Centre
18 September 2000; 18:20	(13–25, 18–25, 17–25); Report			Sydney Entertainment Centre

20 September 2000; 14:30	Kenya	1–3	Australia	Sydney Entertainment Centre
20 September 2000; 14:30	(25–16, 20–25, 15–25, 26–28); Report			Sydney Entertainment Centre

20 September 2000; 18:30	Brazil	3–0	China	Sydney Entertainment Centre
20 September 2000; 18:30	(25–14, 25–21, 25–18); Report			Sydney Entertainment Centre

20 September 2000; 20:30	Croatia	0–3	United States	Sydney Entertainment Centre; Attendance: 8,457; Referees: Kim Kun-Tae (South Korea), Songsak Chareonpong (Thailand)
20 September 2000; 20:30	(19–25, 18–25, 16–25); Report			Sydney Entertainment Centre; Attendance: 8,457; Referees: Kim Kun-Tae (South Korea), Songsak Chareonpong (Thailand)

22 September 2000; 10:00	China	3–0	Kenya	Sydney Showground Pavilion 4
22 September 2000; 10:00	(25–15, 25–14, 25–18); Report			Sydney Showground Pavilion 4

22 September 2000; 18:30	Croatia	0–3	Brazil	Sydney Entertainment Centre
22 September 2000; 18:30	(21–25, 23–25, 23–25); Report			Sydney Entertainment Centre

22 September 2000; 20:30	United States	3–0	Australia	Sydney Entertainment Centre; Attendance: 8,219; Referees: Jarmo Salonen (Finland), Ivan Golianski (Russia)
22 September 2000; 20:30	(25–11, 25–17, 25–10); Report			Sydney Entertainment Centre; Attendance: 8,219; Referees: Jarmo Salonen (Finland), Ivan Golianski (Russia)

24 September 2000; 10:00	Kenya	1–3	Croatia	Sydney Showground Pavilion 4
24 September 2000; 10:00	(25–18, 16–25, 18–25, 18–25); Report			Sydney Showground Pavilion 4

24 September 2000; 12:00	Brazil	3–1	United States	Sydney Showground Pavilion 4 Attendance: 4,686; Referees: Takashi Shimoyama (Japan), Bela Hobor (Hungary)
24 September 2000; 12:00	(25–17, 20–25, 25–15, 25–15); Report			Sydney Showground Pavilion 4 Attendance: 4,686; Referees: Takashi Shimoyama (Japan), Bela Hobor (Hungary)

24 September 2000; 18:30	Australia	0–3	China	Sydney Entertainment Centre
24 September 2000; 18:30	(18–25, 14–25, 15–25); Report			Sydney Entertainment Centre

=== Pool B ===
Pos	Team	Pld	W	L	Pts	SW	SL	SR	SPW	SPL	SPR	Qualification
1	Russia	5	5	0	10	15	5	3.000	465	392	1.186	Quarterfinals
2	Cuba	5	4	1	9	14	4	3.500	419	332	1.262	Quarterfinals
3	South Korea	5	3	2	8	9	9	1.000	393	413	0.952	Quarterfinals
4	Germany	5	2	3	7	8	10	0.800	380	395	0.962	Quarterfinals
5	Italy	5	1	4	6	7	12	0.583	427	446	0.957	
6	Peru	5	0	5	5	2	15	0.133	316	422	0.749	

16 September 2000; 10:00	Germany	0–3	Cuba	Sydney Showground Pavilion 4
16 September 2000; 10:00	(17–25, 18–25, 18–25); Report			Sydney Showground Pavilion 4

16 September 2000; 12:00	Peru	0–3	Russia	Sydney Showground Pavilion 4
16 September 2000; 12:00	(17–25, 13–25, 20–25); Report			Sydney Showground Pavilion 4

16 September 2000; 18:30	South Korea	3–2	Italy	Sydney Entertainment Centre
16 September 2000; 18:30	(23–25, 25–18, 25–22, 22–25, 27–25); Report			Sydney Entertainment Centre

18 September 2000; 10:00	Italy	3–0	Peru	Sydney Showground Pavilion 4
18 September 2000; 10:00	(25–17, 25–20, 25–20); Report			Sydney Showground Pavilion 4

18 September 2000; 12:30	Germany	0–3	South Korea	Sydney Entertainment Centre
18 September 2000; 12:30	(16–25, 21–25, 22–25); Report			Sydney Entertainment Centre

18 September 2000; 20:30	Cuba	2–3	Russia	Sydney Entertainment Centre
18 September 2000; 20:30	(25–20, 21–25, 25–21, 12–25, 13–15); Report			Sydney Entertainment Centre

20 September 2000; 10:00	Peru	0–3	Germany	Sydney Showground Pavilion 4
20 September 2000; 10:00	(16–25, 19–25, 16–25); Report			Sydney Showground Pavilion 4

20 September 2000; 12:00	Russia	3–1	Italy	Sydney Showground Pavilion 4
20 September 2000; 12:00	(29–31, 25–18, 25–21, 25–19); Report			Sydney Showground Pavilion 4

20 September 2000; 12:30	South Korea	0–3	Cuba	Sydney Entertainment Centre
20 September 2000; 12:30	(17–25, 13–25, 15–25); Report			Sydney Entertainment Centre

22 September 2000; 12:00	Cuba	3–0	Italy	Sydney Showground Pavilion 4
22 September 2000; 12:00	(25–18, 25–21, 25–20); Report			Sydney Showground Pavilion 4

22 September 2000; 12:30	South Korea	3–1	Peru	Sydney Entertainment Centre
22 September 2000; 12:30	(19–25, 25–19, 30–28, 25–17); Report			Sydney Entertainment Centre

22 September 2000; 14:35	Germany	2–3	Russia	Sydney Entertainment Centre
22 September 2000; 14:35	(23–25, 25–23, 25–14, 26–28, 6–15); Report			Sydney Entertainment Centre

24 September 2000; 12:30	Italy	1–3	Germany	Sydney Entertainment Centre
24 September 2000; 12:30	(22–25, 25–13, 21–25, 21–25); Report			Sydney Entertainment Centre

24 September 2000; 14:40	Peru	1–3	Cuba	Sydney Entertainment Centre
24 September 2000; 14:40	(25–23, 12–25, 16–25, 16–25); Report			Sydney Entertainment Centre

24 September 2000; 20:30	Russia	3–0	South Korea	Sydney Entertainment Centre
24 September 2000; 20:30	(25–15, 25–21, 25–16); Report			Sydney Entertainment Centre

== Final round ==
- All times are Australian Eastern Standard Time (UTC+10:00).
- venues: Sydney Entertainment Centre (except for 5th–8th places semifinals, which were played at Sydney Showground Pavilion 4).

Quarterfinals
26 September
Brazil	3
Germany	0
26 September
Croatia	0
Cuba	3
26 September
United States	3
South Korea	2
26 September
China	0
Russia	3

Semifinals
28 September
Brazil	2
Cuba	3
28 September
United States	2
Russia	3

Final
30 September
Cuba	3
Russia	2
Third place
30 September
Brazil	3
United States	0

5–8th place
27 September
Germany	3
Croatia	1
27 September
South Korea	1
China	3

5th place
28 September
Germany	1
China	3
7th place
28 September
Croatia	3
South Korea	1

=== Quarterfinals ===
26 September 2000; 12:30	Croatia	0–3	Cuba	Sydney Entertainment Centre
26 September 2000; 12:30	(18–25, 23–25, 21–25); Report			Sydney Entertainment Centre

26 September 2000; 14:30	China	0–3	Russia	Sydney Entertainment Centre
26 September 2000; 14:30	(25–27, 23–25, 25–27)			Sydney Entertainment Centre

26 September 2000; 18:30	Brazil	3–0	Germany	Sydney Entertainment Centre
26 September 2000; 18:30	(25–22, 25–18, 25–17); Report			Sydney Entertainment Centre

26 September 2000; 20:30	United States	3–2	South Korea	Sydney Entertainment Centre; Attendance: 7,496; Referees: Jarmo Salonen (Finland), Paolo Porcari (Italy)
26 September 2000; 20:30	(26–24, 17–25, 25–23, 25–27, 16–14); Report			Sydney Entertainment Centre; Attendance: 7,496; Referees: Jarmo Salonen (Finland), Paolo Porcari (Italy)

=== 5th–8th places ===
==== Semifinals ====
27 September 2000; 10:00	Germany	3–1	Croatia	Sydney Showground Pavilion 4
27 September 2000; 10:00	(27–25, 27–29, 25–21, 25–18); Report			Sydney Showground Pavilion 4

27 September 2000; 12:20	South Korea	1–3	China	Sydney Showground Pavilion 4
27 September 2000; 12:20	(25–23, 19–25, 23–25, 19–25); Report			Sydney Showground Pavilion 4

==== 7th place match ====
28 September 2000; 12:30	Croatia	3–1	South Korea	Sydney Entertainment Centre
28 September 2000; 12:30	(25–18, 24–26, 25–22, 25–21); Report			Sydney Entertainment Centre

==== 5th place match ====
28 September 2000; 14:40	Germany	1–3	China	Sydney Entertainment Centre
28 September 2000; 14:40	(19–25, 19–25, 25–22, 18–25); Report			Sydney Entertainment Centre

=== 1st–4th places ===
==== Semifinals ====
28 September 2000; 18:30	Brazil	2–3	Cuba	Sydney Entertainment Centre
28 September 2000; 18:30	(29–27, 19–25, 25–21, 19–25 ,9–15); Report			Sydney Entertainment Centre

28 September 2000; 20:55	United States	2–3	Russia	Sydney Entertainment Centre; Attendance: 9,031; Referees: Juan Pereyra (Argentina), Songsak Chareonpong (Thailand)
28 September 2000; 20:55	(15–25, 25–23, 15–25, 28–26, 8–15); Report			Sydney Entertainment Centre; Attendance: 9,031; Referees: Juan Pereyra (Argentina), Songsak Chareonpong (Thailand)

==== Bronze medal match ====
30 September 2000; 12:30	(bronze) Brazil	3–0	United States	Sydney Entertainment Centre; Attendance: 9,044; Referees: Stoyan Stoyanov (Bulgaria), Bela Hobor (Hungary)
30 September 2000; 12:30	(25–18, 25–22, 25–21); Report			Sydney Entertainment Centre; Attendance: 9,044; Referees: Stoyan Stoyanov (Bulgaria), Bela Hobor (Hungary)

==== Gold medal match ====
30 September 2000; 14:30	(gold) Cuba	3–2	Russia (silver)	Sydney Entertainment Centre
30 September 2000; 14:30	(25–27, 32–34, 25–19, 25–18, 15–7); Report			Sydney Entertainment Centre

== Final standings ==
Place	Team
1st place, gold medalist(s)	Cuba
2nd place, silver medalist(s)	Russia
3rd place, bronze medalist(s)	Brazil
4	United States
5	China
6	Germany
7	Croatia
8	South Korea
9	Australia
9	Italy
11	Kenya
11	Peru

2000 Women's Olympic champions

Cuba
3rd title

12-woman roster
Yumilka Ruiz, Marlenis Costa, Mireya Luis, Lilia Izquierdo, Idalmis Gato, Regla Bell, Regla Torres, Taismary Agüero, Ana Fernández, Mirka Francia, Marta Sánchez, Zoila Barros
Head coach
Luis Calderon

== Medalists ==
Gold	Silver	Bronze
Cuba Yumilka Ruiz; Marlenis Costa; Mireya Luis; Lilia Izquierdo; Idalmis Gato; Regla Bell; Regla Torres; Taismary Agüero; Ana Fernández; Mirka Francia; Marta Sánchez; Zoila Barros Head coach: Luis Calderon	Russia Olga Potachova; Natalya Morozova; Anastasia Belikova; Yelena Tyurina (L); Lyubov Shashkova; Yelena Godina; Yevgeniya Artamonova; Elizaveta Tishchenko; Yelena Vasilevskaya; Yekaterina Gamova; Tatyana Gracheva; Inessa Sargsyan Head coach: Nikolay Karpol	Brazil Elisângela Oliveira; Janina Conceição; Raquel Silva; Ricarda Lima (L); Hélia Souza; Leila Barros; Walewska Oliveira; Virna Dias; Karin Rodrigues; Kelly Fraga; Érika Coimbra; Kátia Lopes Head coach: Bernardo Rezende

== Individual awards ==
- Most valuable player
  Regla Torres (CUB)
- Best scorer
  Barbara Jelic (CRO)
- Best spiker
  Regla Torres (CUB)
- Best blocker
  Danielle Scott (USA)
- Best server
  Elena Godina (RUS)
- Best digger
  Ricarda Lima (BRA)
- Best setter
  Hélia Souza (BRA)
- Best receiver
  Koo Ki-Lan (KOR)

== See also ==
- Men's Olympic Tournament
