= 2000 United States women's Olympic basketball team =

- Head coach: Nell Fortner

The 2000 United States women's Olympic basketball team competed in the Games of the XXVII Olympiad which were held in Sydney, Australia. The U.S. women's Olympic team won their fourth gold medal, and second consecutive, at the event. They went undefeated, beating Australia in the Gold medal final.

== Roster ==
United States women's national basketball team roster
Players
Coaches

Pos.	No.	Name	Age – Date of birth	Height	Club	Ctr.
G		Ruthie Bolton	33 – May 25, 1967	1.75 m (5 ft 9 in)	Sacramento Monarchs	(United States)
G		Teresa Edwards	36 – June 19, 1964	1.80 m (5 ft 11 in)	U.S. national team	(United States)
F		Yolanda Griffith	30 – March 1, 1970	1.91 m (6 ft 3 in)	Sacramento Monarchs	(United States)
F		Chamique Holdsclaw (†)	23 – August 9, 1977	1.88 m (6 ft 2 in)	Washington Mystics	(United States)
F/C		Lisa Leslie	28 – July 7, 1972	1.96 m (6 ft 5 in)	Los Angeles Sparks	(United States)
G		Nikki McCray	28 – December 17, 1971	1.80 m (5 ft 11 in)	Washington Mystics	(United States)
C		DeLisha Milton	26 – September 11, 1974	1.85 m (6 ft 1 in)	Los Angeles Sparks	(United States)
G		Katie Smith	26 – June 4, 1974	1.80 m (5 ft 11 in)	Minnesota Lynx	(United States)
G		Dawn Staley	30 – May 4, 1970	1.68 m (5 ft 6 in)	Charlotte Sting	(United States)
G/F		Sheryl Swoopes	29 – March 25, 1971	1.83 m (6 ft 0 in)	Houston Comets	(United States)
F		Natalie Williams	29 – November 30, 1970	1.88 m (6 ft 2 in)	Utah Starzz	(United States)
C		Kara Wolters	25 – August 15, 1975	2.01 m (6 ft 7 in)	Indiana Fever	(United States)

Head coach

- (United States) Nell Fortner

Assistant coach(es)

- (United States) Geno Auriemma
- (United States) Peggie Gillom

Legend

- Club – describes last
  club before the competition
- † – Retained on the roster
  but did not play due to injury
- Age – describes age
  on September 16, 2000
- Source –

== Results ==
=== Group stage ===
September 16
21:30

United States	89–75	South Korea

The Dome, Sydney

September 18
16:30

United States	90–61	Cuba

The Dome, Sydney

September 20
16:30

United States	88–77	Russia

The Dome, Sydney

September 22
16:30

United States	93–42	New Zealand

The Dome, Sydney

September 24
19:30

United States	76–57	Poland

The Dome, Sydney

=== Quarterfinal ===
September 27
22:00

United States	58–43	Slovakia
Scoring by half: 32–23, 26–20

The Dome, Sydney
Attendance: 14,605

=== Semifinal ===
September 29
16:30

South Korea	65–78	United States
Scoring by half: 40–42, 25–36

The Dome, Sydney
Attendance: 14,833

=== Gold Medal Final ===
September 30
13:15

Australia	54–76	United States
Scoring by half: 43–30, 33–24

The Dome, Sydney
Attendance: 14,833

== See also ==
- 2000 Summer Olympics
- Basketball at the 2000 Summer Olympics
- United States at the 2000 Summer Olympics
- United States women's national basketball team
