= 1998 FIVB Volleyball World Grand Prix =

Women's volleyball tournament

1998 FIVB World Grand Prix
Tournament details
- Host country: Hong Kong (Group 1 Final)
- Dates: 21 August–13 September
- Teams: 8
- Venue: 1 (in 1 host city)

Final positions
- Champions: Brazil (3rd title)

Tournament awards
- MVP: (Brazil) Leila Barros

The 1998 FIVB World Grand Prix was the sixth women's volleyball tournament of its kind, played by eight countries from 21 August to 13 September 1998. The final round was staged in Hong Kong.

== Preliminary round ==
=== Ranking ===
The best four teams from the overall ranking are qualified for the final round.

Pos	Team	Pld	W	L	Pts	SW	SL	SR	SPW	SPL	SPR	Qualification
1	Cuba	9	8	1	17	25	6	4.167	424	318	1.333	Final round
2	Russia	9	7	2	16	24	9	2.667	452	347	1.303	Final round
3	China	9	7	2	16	21	9	2.333	402	297	1.354	Final round
4	Brazil	9	6	3	15	22	12	1.833	451	349	1.292	Final round
5	Italy	9	4	5	13	14	21	0.667	415	462	0.898	
6	South Korea	9	2	7	11	11	24	0.458	394	470	0.838	
7	Japan	9	2	7	11	10	23	0.435	334	443	0.754	
8	United States	9	0	9	9	4	27	0.148	255	441	0.578	

=== First round ===
==== Group A ====
- Venue: Macau

Date		Score		Set 1	Set 2	Set 3	Set 4	Set 5	Total
21 Ago	Russia	3–0	Japan	15–6	15–8	15–10			45–24
21 Ago	Italy	3–2	Brazil	15–13	15–11	2–15	12–15	15–13	59–67
22 Ago	Russia	3–0	Italy	15–11	15–10	15–8			45–29
22 Ago	Japan	3–2	Brazil	9–15	8–15	15–6	15–10	15–13	62–59
23 Ago	Italy	3–1	Japan	8–15	15–3	16–14	16–14		55–46
23 Ago	Russia	3–0	Brazil	15–13	15–7	15–9			45–29

==== Group B ====
- Venue: Chongqing, China

Date		Score		Set 1	Set 2	Set 3	Set 4	Set 5	Total
21 Ago	Cuba	3–0	United States	15–6	15–8	15–6			45–20
21 Ago	China	3–0	South Korea	17–15	15–13	15–5			47–33
22 Ago	Cuba	3–0	South Korea	15–8	15–11	15–12			45–31
22 Ago	China	3–0	United States	15–6	15–8	15–9			45–23
23 Ago	South Korea	3–1	United States	8–15	15–12	15–7	15–6		53–40
23 Ago	Cuba	3–0	China	15–10	16–14	15–13			46–37

=== Second round ===
==== Group C ====
- Venue: Kaohsiung, Taiwan

Date		Score		Set 1	Set 2	Set 3	Set 4	Set 5	Total
28 Ago	Cuba	3–0	South Korea	16–14	15–10	15–5			46–29
28 Ago	Brazil	3–0	Japan	15–3	15–4	15–8			45–15
29 Ago	Cuba	3–0	Japan	15–10	15–9	15–7			45–26
29 Ago	Brazil	3–2	South Korea	15–13	8–15	15–12	7–15	15–6	60–61
30 Ago	South Korea	3–2	Japan	8–15	15–7	17–15	14–16	15–12	69–65
30 Ago	Brazil	3–1	Cuba	15–9	11–15	15–10	15–6		56–40

==== Group D ====
- Venue: Bangkok, Thailand

Date		Score		Set 1	Set 2	Set 3	Set 4	Set 5	Total
28 Ago	Russia	3–0	Italy	15–12	15–9	15–10			45–31
28 Ago	China	3–0	United States	15–2	15–4	15–5			45–11
29 Ago	Russia	3–2	United States	13–15	15–11	15–6	8–15	15–11	66–58
29 Ago	China	3–1	Italy	15–10	15–13	13–15	15–7		50–53
30 Ago	Italy	3–1	United States	7–15	15–13	15–13	15–7		52–48
30 Ago	China	3–1	Russia	5–15	15–7	15–10	15–12		50–44

=== Third round ===
==== Group E ====
- Venue: Chennai, India

Date		Score		Set 1	Set 2	Set 3	Set 4	Set 5	Total
4 Sep	Russia	3–1	South Korea	15–9	16–14	12–15	15–8		58–46
4 Sep	Cuba	3–1	Italy	16–14	15–9	10–15	15–10		56–48
5 Sep	Cuba	3–0	South Korea	15–5	15–2	15–5			45–12
5 Sep	Russia	3–0	Italy	15–7	15–7	15–10			45–24
6 Sep	Italy	3–2	South Korea	13–15	15–8	6–15	15–12	15–10	64–60
6 Sep	Cuba	3–2	Russia	8–15	15–4	15–12	3–15	15–13	56–59

==== Group F ====
- Venue: Shanghai, China

Date		Score		Set 1	Set 2	Set 3	Set 4	Set 5	Total
4 Sep	China	3–1	Japan	11–15	15–7	15–2	15–6		56–30
4 Sep	Brazil	3–0	United States	15–6	15–7	15–6			45–19
5 Sep	Brazil	3–0	Japan	15–3	15–12	15–6			45–21
5 Sep	China	3–0	United States	15–8	15–1	15–3			45–12
6 Sep	Japan	3–0	United States	15–5	15–12	15–7			45–24
6 Sep	Brazil	3–0	China	15–6	15–8	15–13			45–27

== Final round ==
- Venue: Hong Kong

=== Final four ===
Semifinals
12 September
Cuba	1
Brazil	3
12 September
China	2
Russia	3

Final
13 September
Brazil	3
Russia	0
3rd place match
13 September
Cuba	3
China	1

==== Semifinals ====
Date		Score		Set 1	Set 2	Set 3	Set 4	Set 5	Total
12 Sep	Cuba	1–3	Brazil	6–15	16–17	15–11	15–17		52–60
12 Sep	China	2–3	Russia	15–4	11–15	13–15	15–10	13–15	67–59

==== 3rd place match ====
Date		Score		Set 1	Set 2	Set 3	Set 4	Set 5	Total
13 Sep	Cuba	3–1	China	3–15	15–8	15–9	15–7		48–39

==== Final ====
Date		Score		Set 1	Set 2	Set 3	Set 4	Set 5	Total
13 Sep	Brazil	3–0	Russia	15–11	15–13	15–9			45–33

== Final standings ==
Place	Team
1st place, gold medalist(s)	Brazil
2nd place, silver medalist(s)	Russia
3rd place, bronze medalist(s)	Cuba
4	China
5	Italy
6	South Korea
7	Japan
8	United States

1998 FIVB World Grand Prix winners

Brazil
Third title

Team roster
Leila Barros, Janina Conceição, Raquel Silva, Fofão, Virna Dias, Ana Paula Connelly, Karin Rodrigues, Gisele Florentino, Sandra Suruagy, Hilma Caldeira, Fernanda Doval and Ana Flavia Sanglard.
Head coach
Bernardo Rezende

== Individual awards ==
- Most valuable player:
  - Leila Barros (BRA)
- Best scorer:
  - Lyubov Sokolova (RUS)
- Best spiker:
  - Ana Paula Connelly (BRA)
- Best blocker:
  - Ana Paula Connelly (BRA)
- Best server:
  - Raquel Silva (BRA)
- Best setter:
  - Helia Souza (BRA)
- Best receiver:
  - Yumilka Ruiz (CUB)

== Statistics leaders ==
- Only players whose teams advanced to the final four are ranked.

Best scorers

Rank	Name	Points
1	(Russia) Lioubov Sokolova	131
2	(Brazil) Leila Barros	128
3	(China) Qiu Aihua	115
4	(Cuba) Regla Torres	101
5	(Brazil) Ana Paula Connelly	97

Best spikers

Rank	Name	%Eff
1	(Brazil) Ana Paula Connelly	44.77
2	(Russia) Evgenia Artamonova	39.87
3	(Brazil) Leila Barros	38.54
4	(Cuba) Regla Bell	35.56
5	(Cuba) Ana Ibis Fernandez	32.12

Best blockers

Rank	Name	Avg
1	(Brazil) Ana Paula Connelly	1.62
2	(China) Lai Yawen	1.23
3	(Cuba) Ana Ibis Fernandez	1.10
4	(Russia) Elizaveta Tichtenko	0.96
5	(China) Wu Yong Mei	0.91

Best servers

Rank	Name	Avg
1	(Brazil) Raquel Silva	0.45
2	(Russia) Elena Godina	0.44
3	(China) Qui Ai Hua	0.38
4	(Cuba) Regla Bell	0.30
5	(China) Wang Zilling	0.27

Best receivers

Rank	Name	%Succ
1	(Cuba) Yumilka Ruiz	78.45
2	(Brazil) Leila Barros	74.35
3	(China) Wang Lina	69.21

Best setters

Rank	Name	Avg	%Succ
1	(Brazil) Helia Souza	9.91	52.24
2	(China) HE Qi	7.76	49.65
3	(Cuba) Taismary Aguero	6.73	45.40
4	(Russia) Elena Vassilevskaia	5.74	42.14
5	(Cuba) Idina Mestre	4.75	40.11
