= 2012–13 Liga Nacional Superior de Voleibol Femenino =

Peruvian women's volleyball league season

Liga Nacional Superior de Voleibol Femenino
- Association: FPV
- League: Liga Peruana de Vóley Femenino
- Sport: Volleyball
- Duration: December 12, 2012 to April 28, 2013
- Teams: 12
- Finals champions: Universidad César Vallejo (1st title)
- Runners-up: Universidad San Martín

Seasons
- ← 2011–12 2013–14 →

The 2012–13 Liga Nacional Superior de Voleibol Femenino (Spanish for: 2012–13 Women's Senior National Volleyball League) or 2012–13 LNSVF was the 11th official season of the Peruvian Volleyball League. Universidad César Vallejo won the league championship and qualified to the Women's South American Volleyball Club Championship.

== Teams ==
=== Competing teams ===
Club	Manager
Alianza Lima	(Peru) Carlos Aparicio
Circolo Sportivo Italiano	(Peru) Héctor Agurto
Deportivo Wanka	(Peru) Edwin Jiménez
Divino Maestro	(Peru) Carlos Rivero
Géminis	(Peru) Enrique Briceño
Latino Amisa	(Peru) César Arrese
Regatas Lima	(Peru) Carlos Maldonado
Sporting Cristal	(Peru) José Antonio Cáceres
Túpac Amaru	(Peru) José Castillo
Unión Vallejo Tarapoto	(Peru) Maxwell Bartra
Universidad César Vallejo	(Peru) Natalia Málaga
Universidad San Martín	(Spain) Juan D. García

== Competition format ==
The 2012-13 season uses the same format as the previous edition, the first round is a double round robyn pool between all teams, after the round, the top 8 move on to the quarterfinal play-offs.

== First stage ==
The first round is a Round-Robin system where all 12 teams will play once against the other 11 in home-and-away matches making a total of 132 matches in the round.

Pool standing procedure

1. Match points
2. Numbers of matches won
3. Sets ratio
4. Points ratio

Match won 3–0 or 3–1: 3 match points for the winner, 0 match points for the loser
Match won 3–2: 2 match points for the winner, 1 match point for the loser

Ranking.

Pos	Team	Pld	W	L	Pts	SW	SL	SR	SPW	SPL	SPR	Qualification
1	Universidad San Martín	22	21	1	62	64	9	7.111	1775	1289	1.377	Quarterfinals
2	Universidad César Vallejo	22	20	2	60	64	13	4.923	1845	1317	1.401	Quarterfinals
3	Sporting Cristal	22	17	5	48	53	25	2.120	1783	1583	1.126	Quarterfinals
4	Alianza Lima	22	16	6	47	53	29	1.828	1887	1731	1.090	Quarterfinals
5	Géminis	22	13	9	38	46	38	1.211	1856	1807	1.027	Quarterfinals
6	Divino Maestro	22	9	13	30	37	42	0.881	1638	1749	0.937	Quarterfinals
7	Regatas Lima	22	9	13	26	35	46	0.761	1717	1808	0.950	Quarterfinals
8	Unión Vallejo Tarapoto	22	9	13	25	33	47	0.702	1680	1720	0.977	Quarterfinals
9	Deportivo Wanka	22	7	15	22	30	49	0.612	1529	1819	0.841	
10	Circolo Sportivo Italiano	22	7	15	22	30	50	0.600	1679	1766	0.951	
11	Latino Amisa	22	3	19	8	14	60	0.233	1403	1788	0.785	
12	Túpac Amaru	22	2	20	6	11	62	0.177	1357	1772	0.766	Cuadrangular por la permanencia

=== Results ===
==== First round ====
Date		Score		Set 1	Set 2	Set 3	Set 4	Set 5	Total	Report
12 Dec	Universidad San Martín	3–0	Deportivo Wanka	25–17	25–12	25–11			75–40	
12 Dec	Universidad César Vallejo	3–1	Sporting Cristal	–	–	22–25	25–13		–	
14 Dec	Túpac Amaru	3–1	Latino Amisa	25–20	21–25	25–13	25–17		96–75	
14 Dec	Divino Maestro	3–1	Regatas Lima	19–25	25–19	25–19	25–19		94–82	
15 Dec	Circolo Sportivo Italiano	1–3	Alianza Lima	19–25	14–25	25–17	18–25		76–92	
15 Dec	Deportivo Wanka	3–1	Géminis	25–21	22–25	25–19	25–18		97–83	
15 Dec	Sporting Cristal	3–0	Túpac Amaru	25–21	25–13	25–22			75–56	
15 Dec	Universidad César Vallejo	3–0	Unión Vallejo Tarapoto	25–16	25–7	25–18			75–41	
5 Jan	Géminis	3–0	Regatas Lima	25–22	25–22	26–24			76–68	
5 Jan	Universidad San Martín	3–0	Circolo Sportivo Italiano	25–20	25–16	25–19			75–55	
6 Jan	Divino Maestro	3–0	Latino Amisa	25–13	25–14	25–22			75–49	
6 Jan	Alianza Lima	3–2	Universidad César Vallejo	25–23	25–21	19–25	17–25	15–13	101–107	
9 Jan	Regatas Lima	3–1	Latino Amisa	16–25	28–26	25–16	25–21		94–88	
9 Jan	Universidad César Vallejo	3–0	Circolo Sportivo Italiano	25–20	25–16	25–16			75–52	
11 Jan	Géminis	3–2	Unión Vallejo Tarapoto	20–25	25–21	23–25	25–7	15–7	108–85	
11 Jan	Sporting Cristal	3–0	Divino Maestro	25–14	25–20	25–16			75–50	
12 Jan	Unión Vallejo Tarapoto	3–0	Latino Amisa	25–17	25–12	25–20			75–49	
12 Jan	Alianza Lima	3–1	Túpac Amaru	25–14	25–21	23–25	26–24		99–84	
13 Jan	Regatas Lima	3–2	Unión Vallejo Tarapoto	16–25	25–21	25–12	16–25	15–12	97–95	
13 Jan	Deportivo Wanka	3–2	Circolo Sportivo Italiano	25–14	10–25	15–25	26–24	15–13	91–101	
13 Jan	Universidad César Vallejo	3–0	Universidad San Martín	25–15	30–28	19–25	25–14		99–82	
16 Jan	Divino Maestro	1–3	Alianza Lima	25–23	21–25	21–25	14–25		81–98	
16 Jan	Deportivo Wanka	3–0	Túpac Amaru	25–21	25–22	25–9			75–52	
18 Jan	Sporting Cristal	3–0	Regatas Lima	25–12	25–18	25–21			75–51	
18 Jan	Géminis	3–1	Circolo Sportivo Italiano	23–25	25–14	25–23	25–12		98–74	
19 Jan	Universidad San Martín	3–0	Túpac Amaru	25–8	25–13	25–11			75–32	
19 Jan	Universidad César Vallejo	3–0	Deportivo Wanka	25–21	25–8	25–10			75–39	
19 Jan	Unión Vallejo Tarapoto	1–3	Divino Maestro	9–25	25–23	22–25	23–25		79–98	
20 Jan	Alianza Lima	3–0	Regatas Lima	25–19	25–20	25–16			75–55	
20 Jan	Géminis	3–0	Latino Amisa	25–16	25–13	25–22			75–51	
23 Jan	Regatas Lima	3–0	Deportivo Wanka	25–17	25–15	25–13			75–45	
23 Jan	Universidad San Martín	3–0	Divino Maestro	25–14	25–11	25–17			75–42	
25 Jan	Universidad César Vallejo	3–0	Túpac Amaru	25–13	25–10	25–9			75–32	
25 Jan	Sporting Cristal	3–0	Latino Amisa	25–18	25–11	25–19			75–48	
26 Jan	Divino Maestro	3–0	Deportivo Wanka	25–23	25–16	25–14			75–53	
26 Jan	Alianza Lima	3–1	Latino Amisa	21–25	25–11	26–24	25–22		97–82	
26 Jan	Universidad San Martín	3–0	Regatas Lima	25–13	25–21	25–16			75–50	
26 Jan	Universidad César Vallejo	3–1	Géminis	23–25	25–9	25–23	25–21		98–78	
27 Jan	Circolo Sportivo Italiano	3–0	Túpac Amaru	25–12	26–24	25–22			76–58	
31 Jan	Universidad San Martín	3–0	Latino Amisa	25–18	25–23	25–11			75–52	
31 Jan	Circolo Sportivo Italiano	3–1	Divino Maestro	25–20	25–27	25–15	25–10		100–72	
1 Feb	Alianza Lima	3–0	Unión Vallejo Tarapoto	25–18	25–23	25–23			75–64	
1 Feb	Sporting Cristal	3–2	Géminis	24–26	25–14	19–25	26–24	15–11	109–100	
2 Feb	Deportivo Wanka	3–0	Latino Amisa	25–13	25–18	25–23			75–54	
2 Feb	Universidad San Martín	3–0	Unión Vallejo Tarapoto	25–19	25–20	25–20			75–59	
3 Feb	Universidad César Vallejo	3–2	Divino Maestro	27–29	25–17	25–15	22–25	15–11	114–97	
3 Feb	Géminis	3–0	Túpac Amaru	25–20	25–23	25–16			75–59	
3 Feb	Sporting Cristal	3–0	Unión Vallejo Tarapoto	25–21	25–17	25–15			75–53	
6 Feb	Alianza Lima	1–3	Sporting Cristal	21–25	25–12	23–25	25–27		94–89	
6 Feb	Géminis	0–3	Divino Maestro	14–25	20–25	24–26			58–76	
8 Feb	Regatas Lima	3–1	Túpac Amaru	25–20	19–25	25–19	25–21		94–85	
8 Feb	Sporting Cristal	3–0	Circolo Sportivo Italiano	25–20	25–23	25–23			75–66	
9 Feb	Divino Maestro	3–0	Túpac Amaru	25–23	26–24	25–17			76–64	
9 Feb	Alianza Lima	3–1	Géminis	25–19	25–19	19–25	25–21		94–84	
10 Feb	Circolo Sportivo Italiano	3–0	Latino Amisa	27–25	25–15	25–21			77–61	
10 Feb	Universidad San Martín	3–0	Sporting Cristal	25–20	25–16	25–21			75–57	
10 Feb	Universidad César Vallejo	3–0	Regatas Lima	25–14	25–16	25–19			75–49	
13 Feb	Sporting Cristal	3–1	Deportivo Wanka	25–18	20–25	25–17	25–16		95–76	
13 Feb	Alianza Lima	1–3	Universidad San Martín	27–25	19–25	15–25	15–25		76–100	
15 Feb	Unión Vallejo Tarapoto	3–0	Túpac Amaru	25–7	25–14	25–8			75–29	
15 Feb	Regatas Lima	3–2	Circolo Sportivo Italiano	16–25	25–18	25–21	15–25	15–3	96–92	
16 Feb	Unión Vallejo Tarapoto	3–1	Deportivo Wanka	19–25	25–14	25–22	25–16		94–77	
16 Feb	Universidad San Martín	3–0	Géminis	25–13	25–22	25–16			75–51	
17 Feb	Universidad César Vallejo	3–0	Latino Amisa	25–7	25–14	25–16			75–37	
17 Feb	Circolo Sportivo Italiano	3–0	Unión Vallejo Tarapoto	25–16	25–19	27–25			77–60	
17 Feb	Alianza Lima	3–0	Deportivo Wanka	25–20	25–19	25–14			75–53	

==== Second round ====
Date		Score		Set 1	Set 2	Set 3	Set 4	Set 5	Total	Report
20 Feb	Sporting Cristal	3–0	Unión Vallejo Tarapoto	25–23	25–15	25–15			75–53	
20 Feb	Universidad César Vallejo	3–0	Túpac Amaru	25–18	25–21	25–13			75–52	
22 Feb	Universidad San Martín	3–0	Unión Vallejo Tarapoto	25–16	25–9	25–16			75–41	
22 Feb	Alianza Lima	3–1	Deportivo Wanka	24–26	25–18	25–19	25–20		99–83	
23 Feb	Regatas Lima	3–0	Divino Maestro	27–25	26–24	25–20			78–69	
23 Feb	Géminis	3–2	Circolo Sportivo Italiano	18–25	25–20	20–25	28–26	16–14	107–110	
23 Feb	Universidad César Vallejo	3–0	Deportivo Wanka	25–15	25–13	25–20			75–48	
24 Feb	Unión Vallejo Tarapoto	3–1	Latino Amisa	25–23	26–28	30–28	25–16		106–95	
24 Feb	Universidad San Martín	3–0	Túpac Amaru	25–17	25–13	26–24			76–54	
24 Feb	Sporting Cristal	3–1	Regatas Lima	–	–	–	–		–	
24 Feb	Alianza Lima	3–0	Circolo Sportivo Italiano	25–22	27–25	25–18			77–65	
26 Feb	Universidad San Martín	3–0	Latino Amisa	25–6	25–17	25–17			75–40	
26 Feb	Universidad César Vallejo	3–0	Circolo Sportivo Italiano	25–10	25–15	25–17			75–41	
1 Mar	Deportivo Wanka	3–0	Túpac Amaru	27–25	25–21	25–20			77–66	
1 Mar	Géminis	3–2	Divino Maestro	25–20	25–15	20–25	19–25	15–13	104–98	
2 Mar	Universidad San Martín	3–0	Deportivo Wanka	25–15	25–18	25–16			75–49	
2 Mar	Alianza Lima	3–1	Divino Maestro	25–13	17–25	25–18	27–25		94–81	
6 Mar	Sporting Cristal	3–1	Alianza Lima	25–17	25–23	21–25	25–23		96–88	
10 Mar	Alianza Lima	3–1	Unión Vallejo Tarapoto	23–25	25–19	28–26	25–18		101–88	
10 Mar	Sporting Cristal	3–0	Túpac Amaru	25–16	25–14	25–14			75–44	
10 Mar	Géminis	3–0	Latino Amisa	25–17	26–24	25–19			76–60	
10 Mar	Universidad César Vallejo	3–0	Divino Maestro	25–22	25–22	25–18			75–62	
13 Mar	Sporting Cristal	3–2	Deportivo Wanka	25–15	25–17	23–25	25–27	15–11	113–95	
13 Mar	Regatas Lima	3–0	Géminis	25–20	25–18	25–23			75–61	
15 Mar	Universidad San Martín	3–0	Divino Maestro	25–14	25–14	25–12			75–40	
15 Mar	Universidad César Vallejo	3–0	Latino Amisa	25–7	25–8	25–16			75–31	
20 Mar	Géminis	3–1	Deportivo Wanka	25–20	25–14	19–25	25–19		94–78	
20 Mar	Unión Vallejo Tarapoto	3–2	Circolo Sportivo Italiano	25–15	20–25	21–25	25–23	15–12	106–100	
22 Mar	Universidad César Vallejo	3–0	Unión Vallejo Tarapoto	25–12	25–13	25–11			75–36	
22 Mar	Regatas Lima	3–1	Túpac Amaru	25–13	20–25	25–17	25–22		95–77	
23 Mar	Géminis	3–1	Túpac Amaru	26–28	25–23	25–20	25–18		101–89	
23 Mar	Deportivo Wanka	3–0	Latino Amisa	25–22	25–22	25–16			75–60	
24 Mar	Unión Vallejo Tarapoto	3–2	Deportivo Wanka	23–25	25–17	26–28	25–13	15–7	114–90	
24 Mar	Universidad San Martín	3–1	Circolo Sportivo Italiano	19–25	25–17	25–21	25–16		94–79	
24 Mar	Alianza Lima	3–1	Regatas Lima	17–25	25–23	25–11	25–13		92–72	
24 Mar	Divino Maestro	0–3	Latino Amisa	22–25	20–25	20–25			62–75	
28 Mar	Sporting Cristal	3–0	Circolo Sportivo Italiano	25–21	25–21	25–22			75–64	
28 Mar	Deportivo Wanka	3–1	Regatas Lima	31–29	23–25	25–19	27–25		106–98	
29 Mar	Sporting Cristal	3–2	Divino Maestro	25–15	23–25	25–19	22–25	15–10	110–94	
29 Mar	Universidad San Martín	3–0	Géminis	25–20	25–21	26–24			76–65	
30 Mar	Alianza Lima	3–0	Latino Amisa	27–25	25–11	25–23			77–59	
30 Mar	Divino Maestro	3–0	Circolo Sportivo Italiano	25–19	25–18	25–22			75–59	
30 Mar	Universidad César Vallejo	3–0	Regatas Lima	25–18	27–25	25–19			77–62	
31 Mar	Universidad San Martín	3–0	Sporting Cristal	25–19	25–14	25–23			75–56	
31 Mar	Alianza Lima	1–3	Géminis	25–22	23–25	12–25	15–25		75–97	
31 Mar	Túpac Amaru	3–1	Latino Amisa	19–25	25–18	25–18	25–22		94–83	
3 Apr	Universidad César Vallejo	3–2	Géminis	21–25	25–17	22–25	25–13	15–13	108–93	
3 Apr	Universidad San Martín	3–1	Alianza Lima	25–15	20–25	25–22	25–12		95–74	
5 Apr	Regatas Lima	3–0	Circolo Sportivo Italiano	25–18	25–20	25–18			75–56	
5 Apr	Alianza Lima	0–3	Universidad César Vallejo	19–25	20–25	20–25			59–75	
6 Apr	Unión Vallejo Tarapoto	3–0	Túpac Amaru	26–24	25–12	25–16			76–52	
6 Apr	Sporting Cristal	3–0	Latino Amisa	25–14	25–19	25–17			75–50	
6 Apr	Divino Maestro	3–0	Deportivo Wanka	25–10	25–14	25–18			75–42	
7 Apr	Unión Vallejo Tarapoto	3–1	Divino Maestro	28–30	25–10	25–18	25–9		103–67	
7 Apr	Alianza Lima	3–0	Túpac Amaru	25–15	25–14	25–16			70–45	
7 Apr	Latino Amisa	3–1	Circolo Sportivo Italiano	–	–	–	–		–	
7 Apr	Universidad San Martín	3–2	Universidad César Vallejo	20–25	25–13	25–21	25–27	15–9	110–95	

== Cuadrangular por la permanencia ==
Ranking

Pos	Team	Pld	W	L	Pts	SPW	SPL	SPR	SW	SL	SR	Qualification
1	Túpac Amaru	3	3	0	8	0	0	—	0	0	—	
2	Sport Loreto	3	2	1	6	0	0	—	0	0	—	Relegation to 2013–24 LNIV
3	Deportivo Alianza	3	0	3	2	0	0	—	0	0	—	Relegation to 2013–24 LNIV
4	Asociación Huaquillay	3	1	2	2	0	0	—	0	0	—	Relegation to 2013–24 LNIV

=== Results ===
==== Round 1 ====
Date		Score		Set 1	Set 2	Set 3	Set 4	Set 5	Total	Report
21 Apr	Sport Loreto	–	Deportivo Alianza	–	–	–	–		–	
21 Apr	Túpac Amaru	–	Asociación Huaquillay	–	–	–	–	–	–	

==== Round 2 ====
Date		Score		Set 1	Set 2	Set 3	Set 4	Set 5	Total	Report
22 Apr	Sport Loreto	3–0	Asociación Huaquillay	–	–	–			–	
22 Apr	Túpac Amaru	3–2	Deportivo Alianza	–	–	–	–	–	–	

==== Round 3 ====
Date		Score		Set 1	Set 2	Set 3	Set 4	Set 5	Total	Report
23 Apr	Túpac Amaru	3–1	Sport Loreto	25–23	23–25	25–16	26–24		99–88	
23 Apr	Asociación Huaquillay	3–2	Deportivo Alianza	25–22	14–25	25–22	18–25	15–13	97–107	

== Final round ==
The final round of the tournament is a knockout stage, teams play the quarterfinals seeded according to how they finished ranking-wise in the second round. This round is played best-out-of-three games, for a team to move on to the next stage, they have to win twice against the opposite team.

Quarterfinals
Universidad San Martín	2
Unión Vallejo Tarapoto	0
Alianza Lima	2
Géminis	1
Universidad César Vallejo	2
Regatas Lima	0
Sporting Cristal	2
Divino Maestro	0

Semifinals
Universidad San Martín	2
Alianza Lima	0
Universidad César Vallejo	2
Sporting Cristal	0

Gold-medal match
Universidad San Martín	1
Universidad César Vallejo	2
Bronze-medal match
Alianza Lima	1
Sporting Cristal	2

=== Quarterfinals ===
==== First leg ====
Date		Score		Set 1	Set 2	Set 3	Set 4	Set 5	Total	Report
10 Apr	Universidad San Martín	3–0	Unión Vallejo Tarapoto	25–15	25–15	25–14			75–44	
10 Apr	Géminis	3–1	Alianza Lima	25–20	25–22	20–25	25–15		95–84	
12 Apr	Universidad César Vallejo	3–0	Regatas Lima	25–20	25–18	25–20			75–58	
12 Apr	Divino Maestro	1–3	Sporting Cristal	20–25	15–25	25–21	17–25		77–96	

==== Second leg ====
Date		Score		Set 1	Set 2	Set 3	Set 4	Set 5	Total	Report
13 Apr	Unión Vallejo Tarapoto	1–3	Universidad San Martín	25–20	11–25	16–25	14–25		66–95	
13 Apr	Alianza Lima	3–2	Géminis	21–25	15–25	26–24	25–13	15–9	102–96	
13 Apr	Regatas Lima	0–3	Universidad César Vallejo	15–25	23–25	21–25			59–75	
13 Apr	Sporting Cristal	3–0	Divino Maestro	25–22	25–22	25–19			75–63	

==== Extra game ====
Date		Score		Set 1	Set 2	Set 3	Set 4	Set 5	Total	Report
14 Apr	Alianza Lima	3–2	Géminis	25–20	25–18	20–25	26–28	15–8	111–99	

=== Semifinals ===
==== First leg ====
Date		Score		Set 1	Set 2	Set 3	Set 4	Set 5	Total	Report
17 Abr	Universidad San Martín	3–0	Alianza Lima	25–19	25–13	25–23			75–55	
17 Abr	Sporting Cristal	0–3	Universidad César Vallejo	13–25	19–25	19–25			51–75	

==== Second leg ====
Date		Score		Set 1	Set 2	Set 3	Set 4	Set 5	Total	Report
17 Abr	Alianza Lima	1–3	Universidad San Martín	7–25	25–22	19–25	13–25		75–55	
17 Abr	Universidad César Vallejo	3–0	Sporting Cristal	25–14	25–15	25–17			75–46	

=== Bronze Medal Matches ===
==== First leg ====
Date		Score		Set 1	Set 2	Set 3	Set 4	Set 5	Total	Report
25 Abr	Alianza Lima	3–2	Sporting Cristal	20–25	16–25	25–20	25–21	15–13	101–104	

==== Second leg ====
Date		Score		Set 1	Set 2	Set 3	Set 4	Set 5	Total	Report
27 Abr	Sporting Cristal	3–0	Alianza Lima	25–22	25–20	25–22			75–64	

==== Extra game ====
Date		Score		Set 1	Set 2	Set 3	Set 4	Set 5	Total	Report
27 Abr	Sporting Cristal	3–0	Alianza Lima	25–23	25–18	25–18			75–59	

=== Gold Medal Matches ===
==== First leg ====
Date		Score		Set 1	Set 2	Set 3	Set 4	Set 5	Total	Report
25 Abr	Universidad San Martín	3–2	Universidad César Vallejo	25–13	19–25	23–25	25–20	15–12	107–95	

==== Second leg ====
Date		Score		Set 1	Set 2	Set 3	Set 4	Set 5	Total	Report
27 Abr	Universidad César Vallejo	3–0	Universidad San Martín	25–21	25–21	25–20			75–62	

==== Extra game ====
Date		Score		Set 1	Set 2	Set 3	Set 4	Set 5	Total	Report
28 Abr	Universidad César Vallejo	3–2	Universidad San Martín	25–18	20–25	17–25	25–18	15–10	102–96	

== Final standing ==
Rank	Team
1st place, gold medalist(s)	Universidad César Vallejo
2nd place, silver medalist(s)	Universidad San Martín
3rd place, bronze medalist(s)	Sporting Cristal
4	Alianza Lima
5	Géminis
6	Divino Maestro
7	Regatas Lima
8	Unión Vallejo Tarapoto
9	Deportivo Wanka
10	Circolo Sportivo Italiano
11	Latino Amisa
12	Túpac Amaru

Team qualified for the 2013 South American Club Championship

2012–13 Liga Nacional Superior de Voleibol Champions

Universidad César Vallejo
1st title

Team Roster:

Paola García, Verónica Contreras, Wendy Torres, Rosa del Pilar Hoyos (C), Mabel Olemar, Milagros Moy, Andrea Sandoval, Katherine Romero, Sandra Guibert, Marianne Fersola, Sidarka Nuñez, Mirian Patiño (L)

Head Coach: Natalia Málaga

== Individual awards ==
- Most valuable player
  - (Peru) Milagros Moy (Universidad César Vallejo)
- Best scorer
  - (Dominican Republic) Yonkaira Peña (Universidad San Martín)
- Best spiker
  - (Dominican Republic) Sidarka Nuñez (Universidad César Vallejo)
- Best blocker
  - (Argentina) Florencia Busquets (Sporting Cristal)
- Best server
  - (Peru) Milagros Moy (Universidad César Vallejo)
- Best digger
  - (Peru) Susan Egoavil (Sporting Cristal)
- Best setter
  - (Peru) Verónica Contreras (Universidad César Vallejo)
- Best receiver
  - (Peru) María de Fátima Acosta (Géminis)
- Best libero
  - (Peru) Mirian Patiño (Universidad César Vallejo)
