= Milagros Moy =

Peruvian volleyball player

Personal information
- Full name: Milagros Alicia Moy Alvarado
- Nickname: Mila
- Born: 17 October 1975 (age 51); Lima, Peru
- Height: 1.76 m (5 ft 9 in)
- Weight: 72 kg (159 lb)
- Spike: 296 cm (117 in)
- Block: 282 cm (111 in)

Volleyball information
- Position: Wing spiker
- Number: 8

National team
1994–2009	Peru
Honours
Women's volleyball
Representing Peru
South American Championship
Silver medal – second place	1995 Porto Alegre
Silver medal – second place	1997 Lima
Silver medal – second place	2005 La Paz
Silver medal – second place	2007 Rancagua
Bronze medal – third place	1999 Valencia
Bronze medal – third place	2003 Bogota

Milagros Alicia Moy Alvarado (born October 17, 1975), more commonly known as Milagros Moy, is a Peruvian former volleyball player who represented her native country at the 1996 Summer Olympics in Atlanta and the 2000 Summer Olympics in Sydney, finishing in eleventh place in both tournaments. She played as a wing spiker.

== Club volleyball ==
Moy played with the Peruvian club Cristal Bancoper and won a silver medal at the 1995 South American Club Championship in Medellin, Colombia.

Moy played for the German team Rote Raben Vilsbiburg for the 2008–09 season.

For the 2009–10 season, Moy played with Valeriano Alles Menorca Volei in the Spanish Superliga Femenina de Voleibol.

For the 2012–2013 season, Moy returned to play in the Peruvian League, signing with the Universidad César Vallejo club. She won the league championship and was awarded Most Valuable Player. She then played the South American Club Championship and her club lost to Brazilian Unilever, winning the silver medal and the Best Server individual award.

== Clubs ==
- Cristal Bancoper (1995)
- Preca Brummel Cislago (1996–1997)
- Benidorm (2001–2003)
- Albacete (2003–2006)
- Gran Canaria Hotel Cantur (2006–2008)
- Rote Raben (2008–2009)
- Valeriano Alles Menorca Volei (2009–2010)
- Castellana Grotte (2010–2011)
- Esse-ti La Nef Loreto (2011–2012)
- Universidad César Vallejo (2012–2015)
- Regatas Lima (2015–2017)
- Cristal Bancoper (2017–2020)

== Awards ==
=== Individuals ===
- 2013 Liga Nacional Superior de Voleibol Femenino "Best Server"
- 2013 Liga Nacional Superior de Voleibol Femenino "Best Most Valuable Player"
- 2013 South American Club Championship "Best Server"

=== Senior team ===
- 2005 Bolivarian Games - Gold Medal

=== Clubs ===
- 1995 South American Club Championship - Runner-Up, with Cristal Bancoper
- 2009 German Cup - Champion, with Rote Raben
- 2012 Coppa Italia A2 - Champion, with Esse-ti La Nef Loreto
- 2012–13 Peruvian League - Champion, with Universidad César Vallejo
- 2013 South American Club Championship - Runner-Up, with Universidad César Vallejo
