= Sidarka Núñez =

Dominican volleyball player

Personal information
- Full name: Sidarka de los Milagros Núñez
- Nationality: Dominican
- Born: June 25, 1984 (age 42); Santo Domingo
- Hometown: Santo Domingo
- Height: 1.85 m (6 ft 1 in)
- Weight: 62 kg (137 lb)
- Spike: 330 cm (130 in)
- Block: 320 cm (130 in)

Volleyball information
- Position: Opposite spiker / universal

National team
2002-2015	Dominican Republic
Honours
Women's volleyball
Representing the Dominican Republic
Central American and Caribbean Games
Gold medal – first place	2002 San Salvador	Team
Pan-American Cup
Gold medal – first place	2008 Mexicali/Tijuana	Team
Silver medal – second place	2011 Ciudad Juárez	Team
Silver medal – second place	2005 Santo Domingo	Team
Bronze medal – third place	2007 Colima	Team
NORCECA Championship
Bronze medal – third place	2007 Winnipeg	Team
Final Four Cup
Gold medal – first place	2010 Chiapas	Team
Silver medal – second place	2008 Fortaleza	Team
- Last updated: June 2014

Sidarka de los Milagros Núñez (born June 25, 1984) is a retired volleyball player from the Dominican Republic, who played for the Women's National Team at the 2012 Summer Olympics in London. There her team ended up in fifth place. She claimed the gold medal at the 2008 Women's Pan-American Volleyball Cup in Mexico, where she was named Most Valuable Player of the tournament.

Núñez also won the 2013 Peruvian League Championship with Universidad César Vallejo, winning the season's Best Spiker award and the silver medal in the 2013 South American Club Championship.

== Career ==
Playing with her National Junior Team, Núñez won the silver medal at the 2002 NORCECA Junior Championship.

In 2007-08 she played for Japanese volleyball team Ageo Medics. Playing the next season (2008/2009) for the Hitachi Sawa Rivale.

Núñez won the 2008 Pan-American Cup gold medal with the Dominican Republic National Team, and she was also awarded Most Valuable Player of the tournament. There, she set the record for most points in a single match in the Pan-American Cup with 37 points on June 30 against Brazil.

Playing in Chiapas, Mexico with her National Senior Team she won the 2010 Final Four Cup gold medal.

Núñez was part of the fifth-place finishers team that represented her country during the 2012 Summer Olympics. Her team lost to the USA team in the quarterfinals.

She signed to play the Peruvian National Superior League with the team Universidad César Vallejo. She won the league championship and the Best Spiker award for that season, qualifying to play the South American Club Championship. In the South American tournament, she won the silver medal.

== Clubs ==
- (Dominican Republic) Liga Juan Guzman (1997–1999)
- (Dominican Republic) Naco (2000)
- (Dominican Republic) Deportivo Nacional (2001)
- (Dominican Republic) Los Prados (2002)
- (Dominican Republic) Bameso (2004)
- (Dominican Republic) Liga Juan Guzman (2005)
- (Japan) Ageo Medics (2007–2008)
- (Dominican Republic) Deportivo Nacional (2008)
- (Japan) Hitachi Sawa Rivale (2008–2009)
- (Dominican Republic) Mirador (2010)
- (Puerto Rico) Indias de Mayagüez (2011)
- (Dominican Republic) Malanga (2012)
- (Peru) Universidad César Vallejo (2012–2013)
- (Peru) Universidad César Vallejo (2014–2015)
- (Dominican Republic) Malanga (2015–2017)
- (Peru) Rebaza Acosta (2017–2018)
- (Dominican Republic) Caribeñas (2018–2019)
- (Dominican Republic) Caribeñas (2021)

== Awards ==
=== Individuals ===
- 2008 Pan-American Cup "Most Valuable Player"
- 2013 Liga Nacional Superior de Voleibol Femenino "Best Spiker"

=== National team ===
==== Junior team ====
- 2002 NORCECA Girls Youth Continental Championship U-18 - Silver Medal

=== Clubs ===
- 2012–13 Peruvian League - Champion, with Universidad César Vallejo
- 2013 South American Club Championship - Runner-Up, with Universidad César Vallejo
