= Florencia Busquets =

Argentine volleyball player

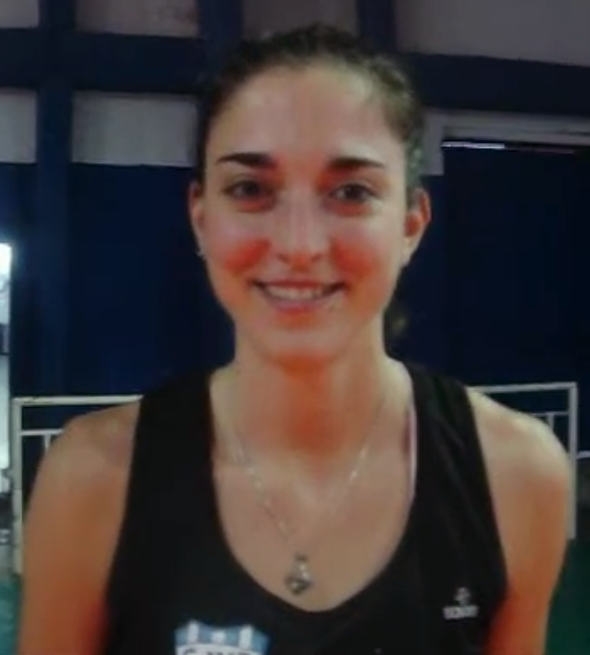
- In a 2013 interview

Personal information
- Full name: Florencia Natasha Busquets Reyes
- Nationality: Argentina
- Born: 27 June 1989 (age 37); Buenos Aires, Argentina
- Height: 1.92 m (6 ft 4 in)
- Weight: 68 kg (150 lb)
- Spike: 305 cm (120 in)
- Block: 290 cm (110 in)

Volleyball information
- Position: Middle Blocker
- Current club: Franches-Montagnes
- Number: 16 (club and national team)

National team
2009–	Argentina
Honours
Women's volleyball
Representing Argentina
South American Championship
Silver medal – second place	2011 Callao	National team
- Last updated: 16 January 2017

Florencia Natasha Busquets Reyes (born 27 June 1989) is an Argentine volleyball player who participated with the Argentina national team at the Pan-American Volleyball Cup (in 2009, 2010, 2012, 2013, 2014, 2015, 2016), the FIVB Volleyball World Grand Prix (in 2011, 2012, 2013, 2014, 2015, 2016), the 2011 FIVB Volleyball Women's World Cup in Japan, the 2014 FIVB Volleyball Women's World Championship in Italy, the 2018 FIVB Volleyball Women's World Championship, and the 2016 Summer Olympics in Brazil.

At club level she played for Talleres de Remedios de Escalada, Instituto Municipal del Deporte (IMDEP) de Lomas de Zamora, Ferro Carril Oeste, River Plate, Club Atlético y Biblioteca Bell, Deportivo Géminis, Sporting Cristal, Boca Juniors, CS Volei Alba-Blaj and Club Atlético Villa Dora and Franches-Montagnes.

== Clubs ==
- (Argentina) Talleres de Remedios de Escalada (junior)
- (Argentina) IMDEP (2004–2005)
- (Argentina) Club Ferro Carril Oeste (2006–2008)
- (Argentina) River Plate (2008–2010)
- (Argentina) Bell Vóley (2010–2012)
- (Peru) Deportivo Géminis (2012–2012)
- (Argentina) Boca Juniors (2013–2013)
- (Peru) Club Sporting Cristal (2013–2013)
- (Argentina) Villa Dora (2013–2014)
- (Romania) CS Volei Alba-Blaj (2014–2014)
- (Switzerland) Franches-Montagnes (2014–2015)
- (Argentina) Boca Juniors (2015–2016)
- (Switzerland) Franches-Montagnes (2016–present)

== Awards ==
=== Individuals ===
- 2008–09 Argentine League "Best Blocker"
- 2012–13 Peruvian League "Best Blocker"
- 2013–14 Argentine League "Best Blocker"

=== National team ===
- 2011 South American Championship – Silver Medal
