= Ilisaine David =

Brazilian basketball player (born 1977)

Medal record

Women's basketball

Representing Brazil

Olympic Games
Bronze medal – third place	2000 Sydney	Team competition

Ilisaine Karen David (born 17 December 1977) is a Brazilian former basketball player who competed in the 2000 Summer Olympics.
