= Katherine Romero =

Colombian lawyer

Katherine Romero is a Colombian attorney working for sexual and reproductive rights for women throughout the Americas and in Africa. She worked on amendments to the laws of Colombia to make abortion legal for cases of rape or in the event that continuance of a pregnancy would endanger the life of the mother or child.

== Biography ==
Katherine Romero Cristancho attained dual degrees in law and political science from the University of the Andes in Bogotá, Colombia and went on to earn a master's degree in Human Rights Protection from the University of Alcala de Henares near Madrid, Spain. She later attained the distinction of Specialist in Criminal Law from the Universidad Externado de Colombia.

In 2005, she was hired as a legal intern with Women's Link Worldwide for the project to challenge the abortion law of Colombia. In 2006, their efforts were acknowledged when the abortion law was liberalized, allowing abortion in the case of rape, in the event that the child would not be viable outside the womb, or in the case that the life of the mother is in jeopardy. For eight years, Romero worked with Women's Link, being promoted to Senior Attorney in 2010. In 2009, she served as visiting attorney for the Inter-American Court of Human Rights and in 2011, Romero was directing a technical project to assist with promotion of Ugandan reproductive rights. Romero's specialty is sexual and reproductive rights and she has directed litigation regionally, nationally and internationally, including cases in Argentina, Bolivia, Colombia, Nicaragua, Peru and Uganda. She also speaks throughout the region on issues facing women and the legal implications of school violence, sexual violence and vulnerability of displaced people, sexuality and rights, as well as building peace initiatives. In 2013 she left Women's Link and is now an independent consultant on international human rights law.

== Selected works ==
- Romero, Katherine; et al. (2007). Implicaciones Éticas, Jurídicas y Médicas de la Sentencia de la Corte Constitucional c-355 (in Spanish). gotá, Colombia: Universidad Nacional de Colombia. ISBN 978-958-9-82205-0.
- Romero Cristancho, Katherine; Díaz Amado, Eduardo; Calderón García, Maria Cristina; Prada Salas, Elena; Barreto Hauzeur, Eliane (November 2010). "Obstacles and challenges following the partial decriminalisation of abortion in Colombia". Reproductive Health Matters. 18 (36): 118–126. doi:10.1016/S0968-8080(10)36531-1. PMID 21111356.
