= Gisele Florentino =

Brazilian volleyball player

Gisele Cristina Florentino

Personal information
- Nationality: Brazilian
- Born: August 1, 1973 (age 53)
- Height: 1.80 m (5 ft 11 in)
- Spike: 282 cm (111 in)
- Block: 278 cm (109 in)

Gisele Cristina Florentino (born 1 August 1973) is a Brazilian female volleyball player.

She played for the Brazil women's national volleyball team at the 1999 FIVB Volleyball Women's World Cup, and 2001 FIVB Volleyball Women's World Grand Champions Cup.
