= Basketball at the 2000 Summer Olympics =

15th Olympic Basketball Tournament
- Sydney 2000

Tournament details
- Olympics: 2000 Summer Olympics
- Host nation: Australia
- City: Sydney
- Duration: 16 September – 1 October

Men's tournament
- Teams: 12
Medals
| Gold medalists | United States |
| Silver medalists | France |
| Bronze medalists | Lithuania |

Women's tournament
- Teams: 12
Medals
| Gold medalists | United States |
| Silver medalists | Australia |
| Bronze medalists | Brazil |

Tournaments
| ← Atlanta 1996 | Athens 2004 → |

Basketball contests at the 2000 Summer Olympics was the fifteenth appearance of the sport of basketball as an official Olympic medal event. It was held from 16 September 2000 to 1 October 2000. Games took place at the Sydney SuperDome and The Dome in Sydney, New South Wales, Australia. The United States earned the gold medals in both the men's and women's competitions.

== Venues ==
Sydney, New South Wales
| Sydney SuperDome | Basketball at the 2000 Summer Olympics is located in Sydney | The Dome |
| Capacity: 18,200 | Basketball at the 2000 Summer Olympics is located in Sydney | Capacity: 10,000 |

== Medalists ==
| Event | Gold | Silver | Bronze |
|---|---|---|---|
| Men | United States Shareef Abdur-Rahim; Ray Allen; Vin Baker; Vince Carter; Kevin Garnett; Tim Hardaway; Allan Houston; Jason Kidd; Antonio McDyess; Alonzo Mourning; Gary Payton; Steve Smith | France Jim Bilba; Yann Bonato; Makan Dioumassi; Laurent Foirest; Thierry Gadou; Cyril Julian; Crawford Palmer; Antoine Rigaudeau; Stéphane Risacher; Laurent Sciarra; Mustapha Sonko; Frédéric Weis | Lithuania Dainius Adomaitis; Gintaras Einikis; Andrius Giedraitis; Šarūnas Jasikevičius; Kęstutis Marčiulionis; Tomas Masiulis; Darius Maskoliūnas; Ramūnas Šiškauskas; Darius Songaila; Saulius Štombergas; Mindaugas Timinskas; Eurelijus Žukauskas |
| Women | United States Ruthie Bolton-Holifield; Teresa Edwards; Yolanda Griffith; Chamique Holdsclaw; Lisa Leslie; Nikki McCray; DeLisha Milton; Katie Smith; Dawn Staley; Sheryl Swoopes; Natalie Williams; Kara Wolters | Australia Carla Boyd; Sandra Brondello; Trisha Fallon; Michelle Griffiths; Kristi Harrower; Jo Hill; Lauren Jackson; Annie la Fleur; Shelley Sandie; Rachael Sporn; Michele Timms; Jenny Whittle | Brazil Janeth Arcain; Ilisaine David; Lilian Gonçalves; Helen Luz; Silvia Luz; Claudia Neves; Alessandra Oliveira; Adriana Pinto; Adriana Santos; Cintia Santos; Kelly Santos; Marta Sobral |

== Qualification ==
A National Olympic Committee (NOC) may enter up to one men's team with 12 players and up to one women's team with 12 players. The reigning world champions and the host country qualify automatically, as do the winners of the five continental championships, plus the Americas runner-up and four additional berths from Europe in the men's competition, and the second and third place from the Americas tournament plus three additional squads from Europe in the women's competition.

=== Basketball – Men ===
| Africa | Americas | Asia | Europe | Oceania | Automatic qualifiers |
|---|---|---|---|---|---|
| Angola | United States; Canada | China | Italy; Lithuania; France; Spain; Russia | New Zealand | (Federal Republic of Yugoslavia) FR Yugoslavia – World champions Australia – Olympic hosts |

=== Basketball – Women ===
| Africa | Americas | Asia | Europe | Oceania | Automatic qualifiers |
|---|---|---|---|---|---|
| Senegal | Cuba; Brazil; Canada | South Korea | Poland; France; Slovakia; Russia | New Zealand | United States – World champions Australia – Olympic hosts |

== Format ==
- Twelve teams are split into two preliminary round groups of six teams each.
- The top four teams from both groups qualify for the knockout stage.
- Fifth-placed teams from both groups compete for 9th place in an additional match.
- Sixth-placed teams from both groups compete for 11th place in an additional match.
- In the quarterfinals, the matchups are as follows: A1 vs. B4, A2 vs. B3, A3 vs. B2, and A4 vs. B1.
  - From the eliminated teams at the quarterfinals, the loser from A1 vs. B4 competes against the loser from A2 vs. B3 for 5th place in an additional match. The remaining two loser teams compete for 6th place in an additional match.
- The winning teams from the quarterfinals meet in the semifinals as follows: A1/B4 vs. A3/B2 and A2/B3 vs. A4/B1.
- The winning teams from the semifinals contest the gold medal. The losing teams contest the bronze.

Tie-breaking criteria:

1. Head to head results
2. Goal average (not the goal difference) between the tied teams
3. Goal average of the tied teams for all teams in its group

== Men's tournament ==
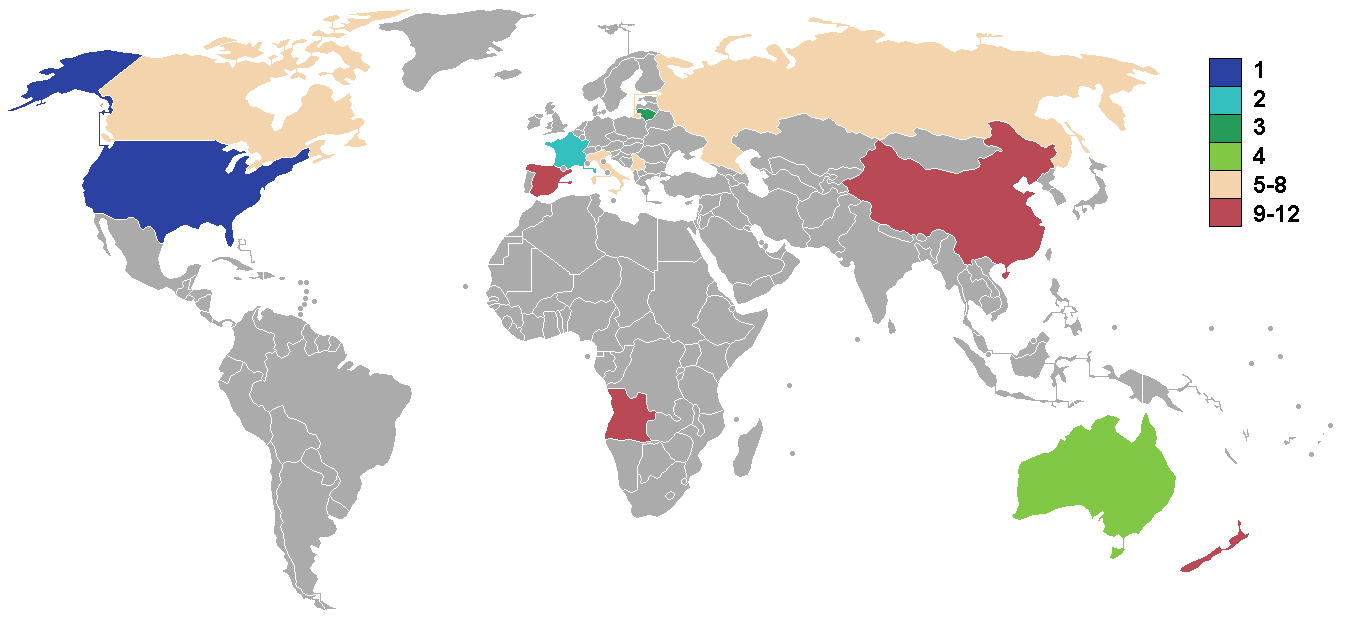
2000 men's teams.

=== Championship bracket ===
Quarterfinals (28 September)
A1 | United States | 85
B4 | Russia | 70
B2 | (Federal Republic of Yugoslavia) FR Yugoslavia | 63
A3 | Lithuania | 76
A2 | Italy | 62
B3 | Australia | 65
B1 | Canada | 63
A4 | France | 68

Semifinals (29 September)
A1 | United States | 85
A3 | Lithuania | 83
B3 | Australia | 52
A4 | France | 76

Gold medal game (1 October)
A1 | United States | 85
A4 | France | 75
Third place
A3 | Lithuania | 89
B3 | Australia | 71

== Women's tournament ==
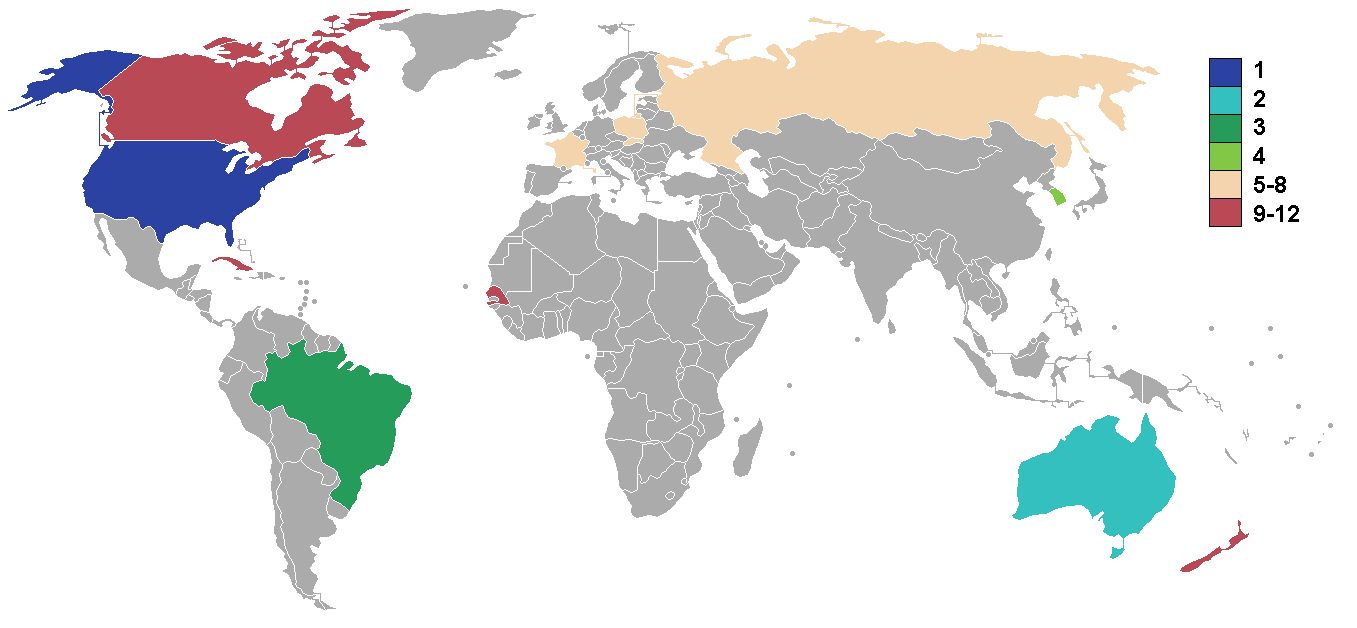
2000 women's teams.

=== Championship bracket ===
Quarterfinals (27 September)
A1 | Australia | 76
B4 | Poland | 48
B2 | Russia | 67
A3 | Brazil | 68
A2 | France | 58
B3 | South Korea | 69
B1 | United States | 58
A4 | Slovakia | 43

Semifinals (29 September)
A1 | Australia | 64
A3 | Brazil | 52
B3 | South Korea | 65
B1 | United States | 78

Gold medal game (30 September)
A1 | Australia | 54
B1 | United States | 76
Bronze medal game
A3 | Brazil (OT) | 84
B3 | South Korea | 73

== Final standings ==
| Rank | Men | | | | Women | | | |
| Rank | Team | Pld | W | L | Team | Pld | W | L |
|---|---|---|---|---|---|---|---|---|
| 1st place, gold medalist(s) | United States | 8 | 8 | 0 | United States | 8 | 8 | 0 |
| 2nd place, silver medalist(s) | France | 8 | 4 | 4 | Australia | 8 | 7 | 1 |
| 3rd place, bronze medalist(s) | Lithuania | 8 | 5 | 3 | Brazil | 8 | 4 | 4 |
| 4th | Australia | 8 | 4 | 4 | South Korea | 8 | 4 | 4 |
Eliminated at the quarterfinals
| 5th | Italy | 7 | 4 | 3 | France | 7 | 5 | 2 |
| 6th | (Federal Republic of Yugoslavia) FR Yugoslavia | 7 | 4 | 3 | Russia | 7 | 3 | 4 |
| 7th | Canada | 7 | 5 | 2 | Slovakia | 7 | 3 | 4 |
| 8th | Russia | 7 | 3 | 4 | Poland | 7 | 3 | 4 |
Preliminary round 5th placers
| 9th | Spain | 6 | 2 | 4 | Cuba | 6 | 2 | 4 |
| 10th | China | 6 | 2 | 4 | Canada | 6 | 2 | 4 |
Preliminary round 6th placers
| 11th | New Zealand | 6 | 1 | 5 | New Zealand | 6 | 1 | 5 |
| 12th | Angola | 6 | 0 | 6 | Senegal | 6 | 0 | 6 |
