= Karin Rodrigues =

Brazilian volleyball player (born 1971)

Personal information
- Full name: Karin Rodrigues
- Born: 8 November 1971 (age 54); São Paulo, Brazil
- Height: 1.87 m (6 ft 2 in)
- Weight: 77 kg (170 lb)
- Spike: 309 cm (122 in)
- Block: 285 cm (112 in)

Volleyball information
- Position: Middle blocker

National team
Brazil
Honours
Women's volleyball
Representing Brazil
Summer Olympics
Bronze medal – third place	2000 Sydney	Team
World Cup
Bronze medal – third place	1999 Japan	Team
World Grand Prix
Gold medal – first place	1996 Shanghai
Gold medal – first place	1998 Hong Kong
Silver medal – second place	1999 Yu Xi
Bronze medal – third place	2000 Quezon City
World Grand Champions Cup
Bronze medal – third place	1997 Japan	Team
Pan American Games
Gold medal – first place	1999 Winnipeg	Team

Karin Rodrigues (born 8 November 1971) is a Brazilian volleyball player.

She competed for Brazil at the 1999 FIVB World Cup and 2000 Summer Olympics. There, she won the bronze medal with the Women's National Team. Rodrigues also claimed the gold medal at the 1999 Pan American Games.

== Career ==
Rodrigues won the best blocker award and the gold medal in the 1995 South American Club Championship playing with the Peruvian club Juventus Sipesa.

== Individual awards ==
- 1995 South American Club Championship – "Best Blocker"
- 1996–97 Brazilian Superliga – "Best Spiker"
