= Margareth Montão =

Brazilian handball player (born 1971)

Personal information
- Born: 19 July 1971 (age 55) São Paulo, Brazil
- Height: 180 cm (71 in)

Sport
- Sport: Handball
National team
- Years: Team
- –: Brazil

Margareth Montão (born 19 July 1971) is a Brazilian handball player.

She was born in São Paulo, Brazil. She competed at the 2004 Summer Olympics, where Brazil placed 7th.
