= 1995 Women's South American Volleyball Club Championship =

Tournament details
- Host country: Colombia
- Dates: April 1–8, 1995
- Teams: 6
- Venue: Coliseo Yesid Santos (in Medellín host cities)

Final positions
- Champions: (Peru) Juventus Sipesa (1st title)

The 1995 Women's South American Volleyball Club Championship was the 1995 annual edition of the women's volleyball tournament, played by six teams from 3 countries from April 1–8, 1995 in Medellín, Colombia. Among the participants were the Peruvian champion Cristal Bancoper and the vice champions, Juventus Sipesa, Argentinians Racing, Universidad Católica from Chile and the host nation were represented by Orgullo Paisa. The Brazilian clubs refused to join the tournament because their tournament was still in play.

== Competing clubs ==
Group A

(Argentina) Racing
(Chile) Universidad Católica
(Colombia) Orgullo Paisa
(Peru) Juventus Sipesa
(Peru) Cristal Bancoper
(Venezuela) Indias Guerreras de Miranda

== Round robin ==
Pos	Team	Pld	W	L	Pts	SW	SL	SR	SPW	SPL	SPR	Qualification
1	(Peru) Juventus Sipesa	5	5	0	10	15	0	MAX	226	84	2.690	Semifinals
2	(Peru) Cristal Bancoper	5	4	1	9	12	4	3.000	211	114	1.851	Semifinals
3	(Venezuela) Indias Guerreras de Miranda	5	2	3	7	8	9	0.889	190	198	0.960	Semifinals
4	(Argentina) Racing	5	2	3	7	7	10	0.700	184	214	0.860	Semifinals
5	(Colombia) Orgullo Paisa	5	2	3	7	6	10	0.600	152	199	0.764	
6	(Chile) Universidad Católica	2	0	2	2	0	15	0.000	71	225	0.316	

Date		Score		Set 1	Set 2	Set 3	Set 4	Set 5	Total
2 Apr	Cristal Bancoper (Peru)	3–0	(Argentina) Racing	15–6	15–3	15–6			45–15
2 Apr	Orgullo Paisa (Colombia)	3–0	(Chile) Universidad Católica	15–4	15–6	15–8			45–18
2 Apr	Juventus Sipesa (Peru)	3–0	(Venezuela) Indias Guerreras	15–9	15–6	15–5			45–20
3 Apr	Juventus Sipesa (Peru)	3–0	(Colombia) Orgullo Paisa	15–6	15–5	15–5			45–16
3 Apr	Cristal Bancoper (Peru)	3–0	(Chile) Universidad Católica	15–2	15–4	15–2			45–8
3 Apr	Racing (Argentina)	3–0	(Venezuela) Indias Guerreras	15–10	15–9	12–15	15-12		57–46
4 Apr	Juventus Sipesa (Peru)	3–0	(Peru) Cristal Bancoper	15–1	16–14	15–3			46–18
4 Apr	Indias Guerreras (Venezuela)	3–0	(Colombia) Orgullo Paisa	15–5	15–12	15–6			45–23
4 Apr	Racing (Argentina)	3–0	(Chile) Universidad Católica	15–10	15–5	15–6			57–21
5 Apr	Orgullo Paisa (Colombia)	3–1	(Argentina) Racing	15–12	15–13	12–15	15-6		57–46
5 Apr	Juventus Sipesa (Peru)	3–0	(Chile) Universidad Católica	15–5	15–2	15–2			45–9
5 Apr	Cristal Bancoper (Peru)	3–1	(Venezuela) Indias Guerreras	15–10	15–7	13–15	15-2		58–34
6 Apr	Cristal Bancoper (Peru)	3–0	(Colombia) Orgullo Paisa	15–8	15–1	15–2			45–11
6 Apr	Juventus Sipesa (Peru)	3–0	(Argentina) Racing	15–8	15–7	15–6			45–21
6 Apr	Indias Guerreras (Venezuela)	3–0	(Chile) Universidad Católica	15–3	15–1	15–11			45–15

== Final round ==
=== Bracket ===
Semifinals
April 7 – Medellín
(Peru) Juventus Sipesa	3
(Argentina) Racing	0
April 7 – Medellín
(Peru) Cristal Bancoper	3
(Venezuela) Indias Guerreras	1

Final
April 8 – Medellín
(Peru) Juventus Sipesa	3
(Peru) Cristal Bancoper	1
3rd place
April 8 – Medellín
(Venezuela) Indias Guerreras	3
(Argentina) Racing	0

=== Semifinals ===
Date		Score		Set 1	Set 2	Set 3	Set 4	Set 5	Total
7 Apr	Juventus Sipesa (Peru)	3–0	(Argentina) Racing	15–10	15–4	15–12			45–26
7 Apr	Cristal Bancoper (Peru)	3–0	(Venezuela) Indias Guerreras	15–8	15–5	4–15	15-8		49–36

=== 3rd place ===
Date		Score		Set 1	Set 2	Set 3	Set 4	Set 5	Total
8 Apr	Indias Guerreras (Venezuela)	3–0	(Argentina) Racing	15–11	17–15	16–14			48–30

=== Final ===
Date		Score		Set 1	Set 2	Set 3	Set 4	Set 5	Total
8 Apr	Juventus Sipesa (Peru)	3–1	(Peru) Cristal Bancoper	15–10	15–3	12–15	15-11		57–39

== Final standing ==
Rank	Team
1st place, gold medalist(s)	(Peru) Juventus Sipesa
2nd place, silver medalist(s)	(Peru) Cristal Bancoper
3rd place, bronze medalist(s)	(Venezuela) Indias Guerreras de Miranda
4	(Colombia) Orgullo Paisa
5	(Argentina) Racing
6	(Chile) Universidad Católica

1995 Women's South American Volleyball Club Champions

1st title

== Awards ==
- Best blocker: (Brazil) Karin Rodrigues (Juventus Sipesa)
