= Silvia Andrea Santos Luz =

Brazilian basketball player (born 1975)

Medal record

Women's basketball

Representing Brazil

Olympic Games
Silver medal – second place	1996 Atlanta	Team competition
Bronze medal – third place	2000 Sydney	Team competition

Silvia Andrea Santos Luz (born March 5, 1975, in Araçatuba), nicknamed Silvinha, is a Brazilian women's basketball player. She represented her country twice at the Summer Olympics, starting in 1996 (Atlanta, Georgia), and won a silver and a bronze medal with the Brazil women's national basketball team.
