= Lilian Gonçalves =

Brazilian basketball player (born 1979)

Olympic medal record

Women's basketball

Representing Brazil
Bronze medal – third place	2000 Sydney	Team competition

Lilian Cristina Lopes Gonçalves (born 25 April 1979) is a Brazilian former basketball player who competed in the 2000 Summer Olympics.
