= Cláudia das Neves =

Brazilian basketball player (born 1975)

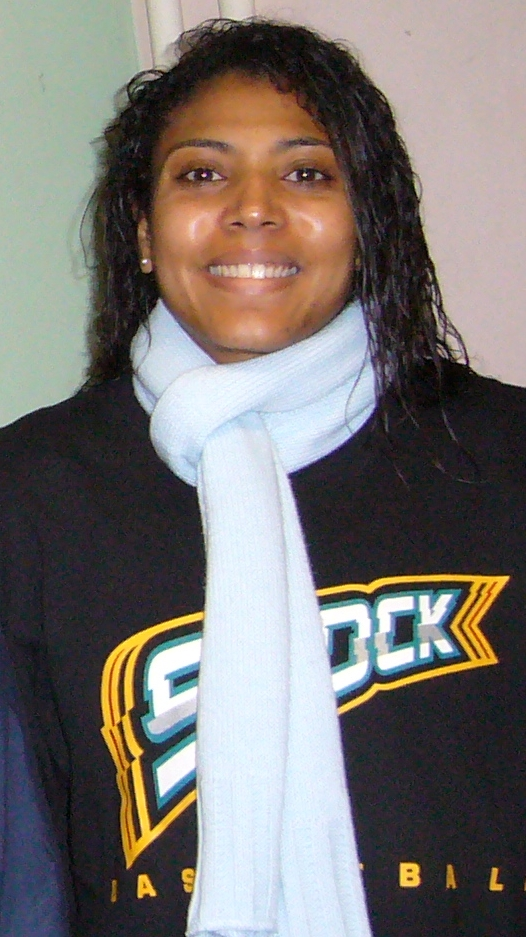

Medal record

Women's Basketball

Representing Brazil

Olympic Games
Bronze medal – third place	2000 Sydney	Team competition

Cláudia Maria das Neves (born 17 February 1975 in Guarujá, São Paulo) is a Brazilian women's basketball player. Internationally, Claudinha has competed in two Summer Olympics: 2000 and 2008 Summer games with the Brazil women's national basketball team. At the 2000 games, Claudinha won a bronze medal. She has also competed for Brazil in other international competitions, including the 2002 FIBA World Championship for Women. Professionally, the Brazilian played in the WNBA in the United States from 1999-2002; the first three with the Detroit Shock and her final season with the Miami Sol.
