= Adriana Santos =

Brazilian basketball player (born 1971)

Personal information
- Born: 18 January 1971 (age 55) São Bernardo do Campo, São Paulo

Sport
- Country: Brazil
Medal record
Women's basketball
Representing Brazil
Olympic Games
| Silver medal – second place | 1996 Atlanta | Team competition |
| Bronze medal – third place | 2000 Sydney | Team competition |
World Championship
| Gold medal – first place | 1994 Australia | Team competition |
Pan American Games
| Gold medal – first place | 1991 Havana | Team competition |

Adriana Aparecida dos Santos (born 18 January 1971) is a Brazilian former basketball player. As part of the national team, Adriana was world champion in the 1994 FIBA World Championship for Women, and appeared in three Olympic Games, Barcelona 1992, Atlanta 1996, and Sydney 2000, winning silver and bronze in the latter two.
