= Dilane Roese =

Brazilian handball player (born 1977)

Personal information
- Born: 15 September 1977 (age 48) Novo Hamburgo, Brazil

Sport
- Sport: Handball

Dilane Roese (born 15 September 1977) is a Brazilian former handball player. She competed in the women's tournament at the 2000 Summer Olympics.
