= Janina Conceição =

Brazilian volleyball player (born 1972)

Personal information
- Full name: Janina Déia Chagas da Conceição
- Born: 25 October 1972 (age 54); Rio de Janeiro, Brazil
- Height: 1.92 m (6 ft 4 in)
- Weight: 82 kg (181 lb)
- Spike: 312 cm (123 in)
- Block: 288 cm (113 in)

Volleyball information
- Position: Middle blocker
- Number: 3

National team
1994–2003	Brazil
Honours
Women's volleyball
Representing Brazil
Summer Olympics
Bronze medal – third place	2000 Sydney	Team
World Championship
Silver medal – second place	1994 Brazil	Team
World Cup
Bronze medal – third place	1999 Japan	Team
World Grand Prix
Gold medal – first place	1998 Hong Kong
Silver medal – second place	1999 Yu Xi
Bronze medal – third place	2000 Quezon City
World Grand Champions Cup
Bronze medal – third place	1997 Japan
Pan American Games
Gold medal – first place	1999 Winnipeg	Team

Janina Déia Chagas da Conceição (born 25 October 1972) is a Brazilian former volleyball player who competed for Brazil in the 1996 Summer Olympics in Atlanta and 2000 Summer Olympics in Sydney. She won the gold medal with the Women's National Team at the 1999 Pan American Games in Winnipeg. She participated at the 1999 FIVB World Cup in Japan.
