= Ricarda Lima =

Brazilian volleyball player (born 1970)

Personal information
- Full name: Ricarda Raquel Barbosa Lima
- Born: 12 September 1970 (age 56); Taguatinga, Federal District, Brazil
- Height: 1.85 m (6 ft 1 in)
- Weight: 66 kg (146 lb)

Volleyball information
- Position: Libero
- Number: 5

National team
Brazil
Honours
Women's volleyball
Representing Brazil
Summer Olympics
Bronze medal – third place	2000 Sydney	Team
FIVB World Cup
Bronze medal – third place	1999 Japan	Team
FIVB World Grand Prix
Silver medal – second place	1995 Shanghai
Silver medal – second place	1999 Yu Xi
Bronze medal – third place	2000 Quezon City
Pan American Games
Silver medal – second place	1991 Havana	Team

Ricarda Raquel Barbosa Lima (born 12 September 1970) is a Brazilian former volleyball player. She competed for Brazil at the 2000 Summer Olympics in Sydney, Australia, where she won the bronze medal with the Women's National Team. She competed at the 1999 FIVB Volleyball Women's World Cup.

== Clubs ==
- (Brazil) Leites Nestlé (1995–1997)
- (Brazil) BCN/Osasco (2000–2001)
- (Brazil) Brasil Telecom/Força Olímpica (2003–2004)
- (Brazil) Rexona/Ades (2004–2005)

== Awards ==
=== Individuals ===
- 1998–99 Brazilian Superliga – "Best Receiver"
- 1999 FIVB World Grand Prix – "Best Digger"
- 2000 Summer Olympics – "Best Digger"
- 2000–01 Brazilian Superliga – "Best Libero"
