= Raquel Silva =

Brazilian volleyball player (born 1978)

Personal information
- Full name: Raquel Peluci Xavier Camargo da Silva
- Born: 30 April 1978 (age 48); Rio de Janeiro, Brazil
- Height: 1.91 m (6 ft 3 in)
- Weight: 69 kg (152 lb)
- Spike: 300 cm (118 in)
- Block: 282 cm (111 in)

Volleyball information
- Position: Outside hitter
- Number: 4

National team
1998–2005	Brazil
Honours
Women's volleyball
Representing Brazil
Olympic Games
Bronze medal – third place	2000 Sydney	Team
World Cup
Silver medal – second place	2003 Japan	Team
World Grand Prix
Gold medal – first place	1998 Hong Kong	Team
Gold medal – first place	2005 Sendai	Team
Silver medal – second place	1999 Yu Xi	Team
Bronze medal – third place	2000 Quezon City	Team
Pan American Games
Gold medal – first place	1999 Winnipeg	Team
CSV South American Championship
Gold medal – first place	2003 Bogotá
Gold medal – first place	2005 La Paz

Raquel Peluci Xavier Camargo da Silva (born 30 April 1978), more commonly known as Raquel, is a Brazilian former volleyball player who played for the Brazil women's national volleyball team at the 2000 Summer Olympics in Sydney, where she won a bronze medal. Raquel also claimed a gold medal at the 1999 Pan American Games in Winnipeg.

== Individual awards ==
- 1998 FIVB World Grand Prix – "Best Server"
- 2007–08 Korean V-League – "Best Server"

Awards
Preceded by (Cuba) Lilia Izquierdo	Best Server of FIVB World Grand Prix; 1998	Succeeded by (Russia) Lyubov Sokolova
