= Kátia Lopes =

Brazilian volleyball player (born 1973)

Personal information
- Full name: Kátia Andreia Caldeira Lopes Monteiro
- Nationality: Brazilian
- Born: 13 July 1973 (age 53); Barranquilla, Atlántico, Colombia
- Height: 1.72 m (5 ft 8 in)
- Weight: 64 kg (141 lb)

Volleyball information
- Position: Setter
Honours
Women's volleyball
Representing Brazil
Olympic Games
Bronze medal – third place	2000 Sydney	Team
World Grand Prix
Silver medal – second place	1995 Shanghai
Bronze medal – third place	2000 Quezon City

Kátia Andréia Caldeira Lopes (born 13 July 1973) is a volleyball player. She competed for Brazil at the 2000 Summer Olympics in Sydney, Australia. There, she won the bronze medal with the Women's National Team.
