= Kelly Fraga =

Brazilian volleyball player (born 1974)

Kely Fraga

Personal information
- Full name: Kely Kolasco Fraga
- Born: 3 October 1974 (age 52); Belo Horizonte, Minas Gerais, Brazil
- Height: 1.94 m (6 ft 4 in)
- Weight: 78 kg (172 lb)

Volleyball information
- Position: Middle blocker
Honours
Women's volleyball
Representing Brazil
Olympic Games
Bronze medal – third place	2000 Sydney	Team
World Grand Prix
Bronze medal – third place	2000 Quezon City

Kelly Kolasco Fraga (born 3 October 1974) is a Brazilian volleyball player who competed for Brazil at the 2000 Summer Olympics in Sydney, Australia. There she won the bronze medal with the Women's National Team.
