= Sydney Showground (Olympic Park) =

Arena in Sydney, New South Wales, Australia

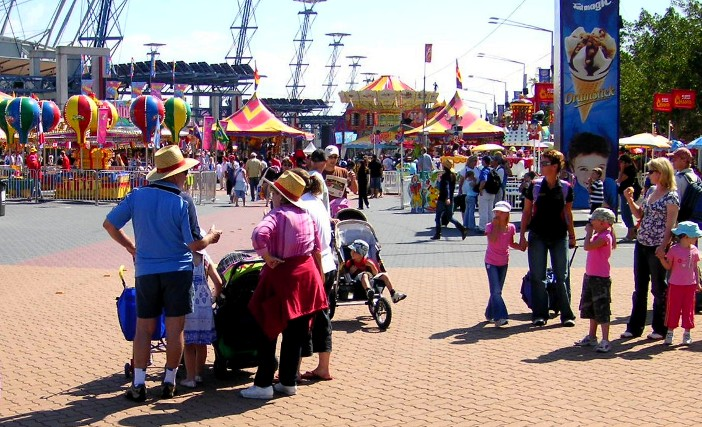
Arriving at the Showground during the Royal Easter Show

The Sydney Showground is a purpose-built venue used each year for the Sydney Royal Easter Show. Located at Sydney Olympic Park in Sydney, New South Wales, Australia, it was opened in 1998, as a venue for the 2000 Summer Olympics and to replace the former Sydney Showground at Moore Park. Sydney Showground is operated by the Royal Agricultural Society of New South Wales, under lease from the Government of New South Wales.

== Sydney Showground Stadium ==
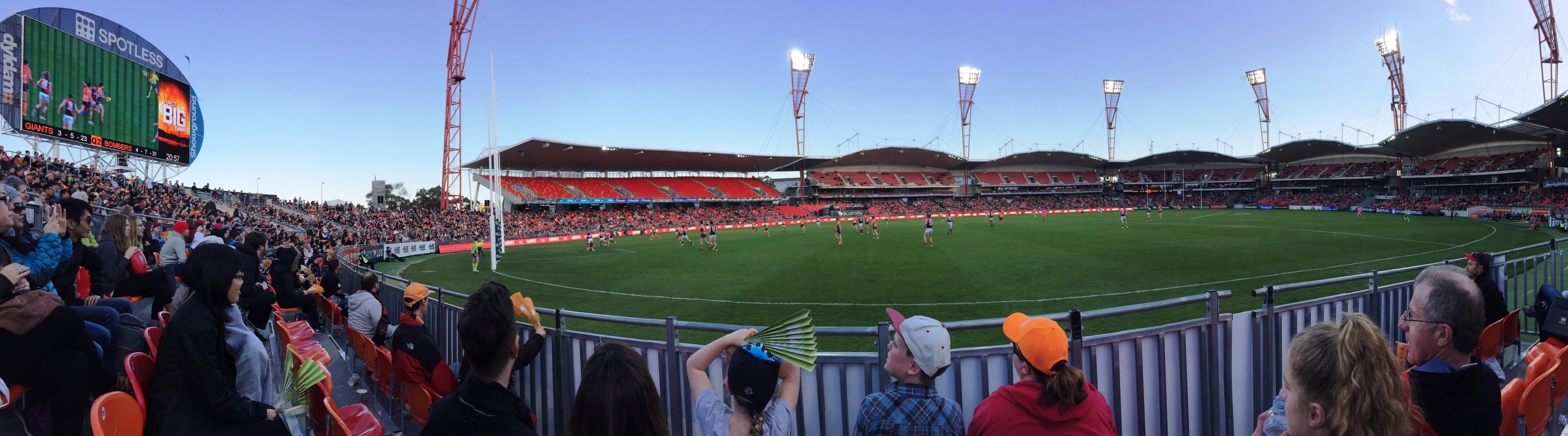
Sydney Showground Stadium during an Australian rules football game

Sydney Showground Stadium (known commercially as ENGIE Stadium) is the centrepiece of the Showgrounds and is used for flagship show events such as the Grand Parade. It has been used for various sports including baseball at the 2000 Summer Olympics and rugby league between 2001 and 2005. Since 2012, it has been used for Australian rules football matches as the primary home ground of the Greater Western Sydney Giants, who compete in the Australian Football League. Twenty20 cricket has been played at the stadium since 2015, when the stadium became the home ground of Big Bash League team the Sydney Thunder.

== The Dome ==
The Dome
- The Dome and Exhibition Complex
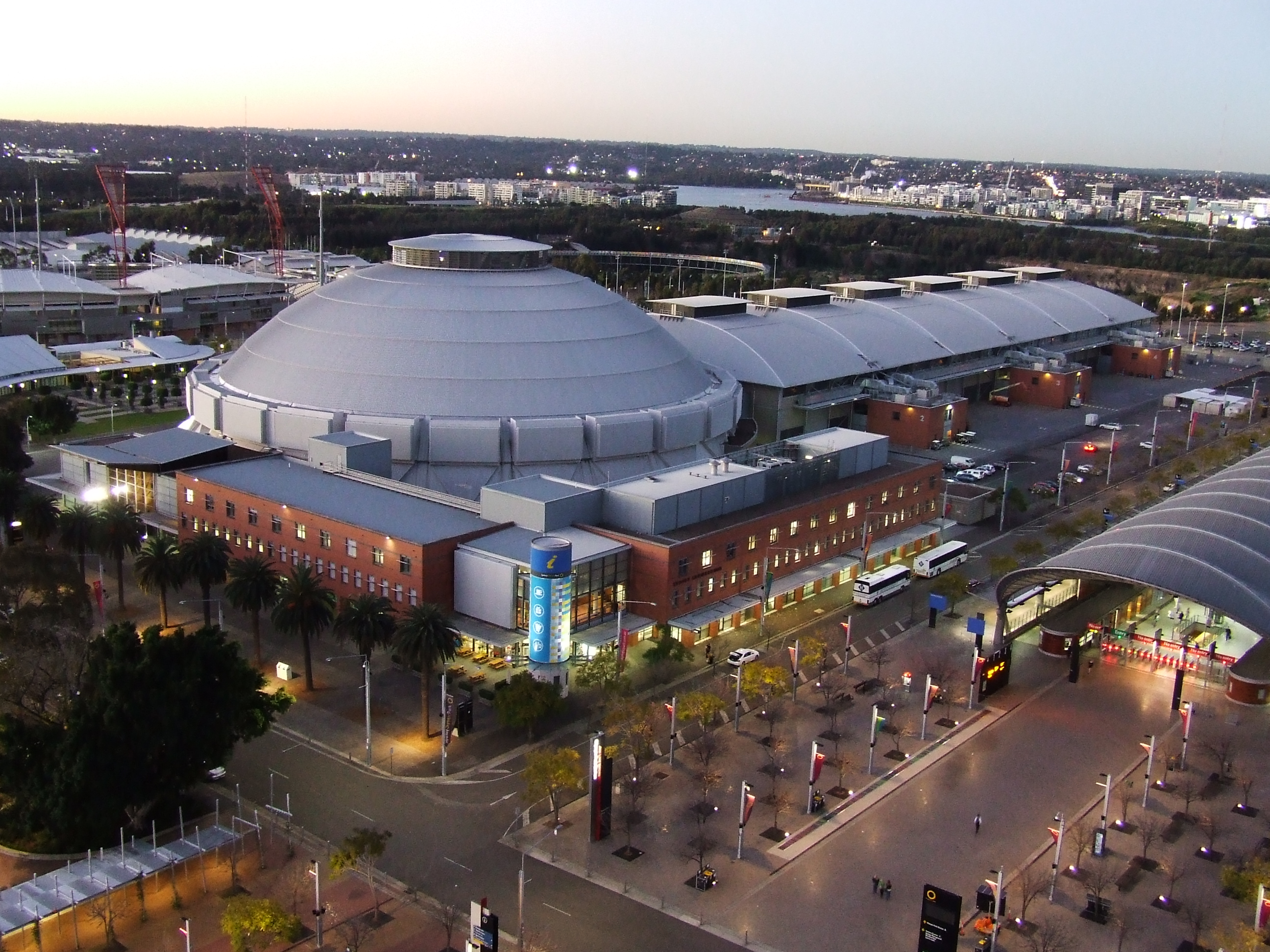
- Interactive map of The Dome
- Location: 1 Showground Road, Sydney Olympic Park, New South Wales
- Coordinates: 33°50′44″S 151°4′5″E
- Operator: Royal Agricultural Society of New South Wales
- Capacity: 10,000

Construction
- Groundbreaking: Mid-1997
- Opened: April 1998

The Dome, also known as The Dome and Exhibition Complex, is a large indoor venue with a circular shaped floor plan and a ceiling up to 42 metres in height. It has 7,200 square metres of floor space, which can be expanded to 21,600 square metres when combined with the adjoining Exhibitions Halls 2, 3, & 4.

During the Olympics, it hosted the finals for team handball and some of the preliminary basketball games. Four other pavilions were constructed during the games to host badminton, rhythmic gymnastics, handball and indoor volleyball events, as well as the shooting and fencing part of the modern pentathlon competition.

The Dome and the adjacent exhibition halls are used for corporate functions, trade shows and exhibitions such as Supanova Expo. The Dome is occasionally used to film TV shows, including the 2008 series of Gladiators Australia and early episodes of Junior MasterChef Australia 2011.

== Charles Moses Stadium ==
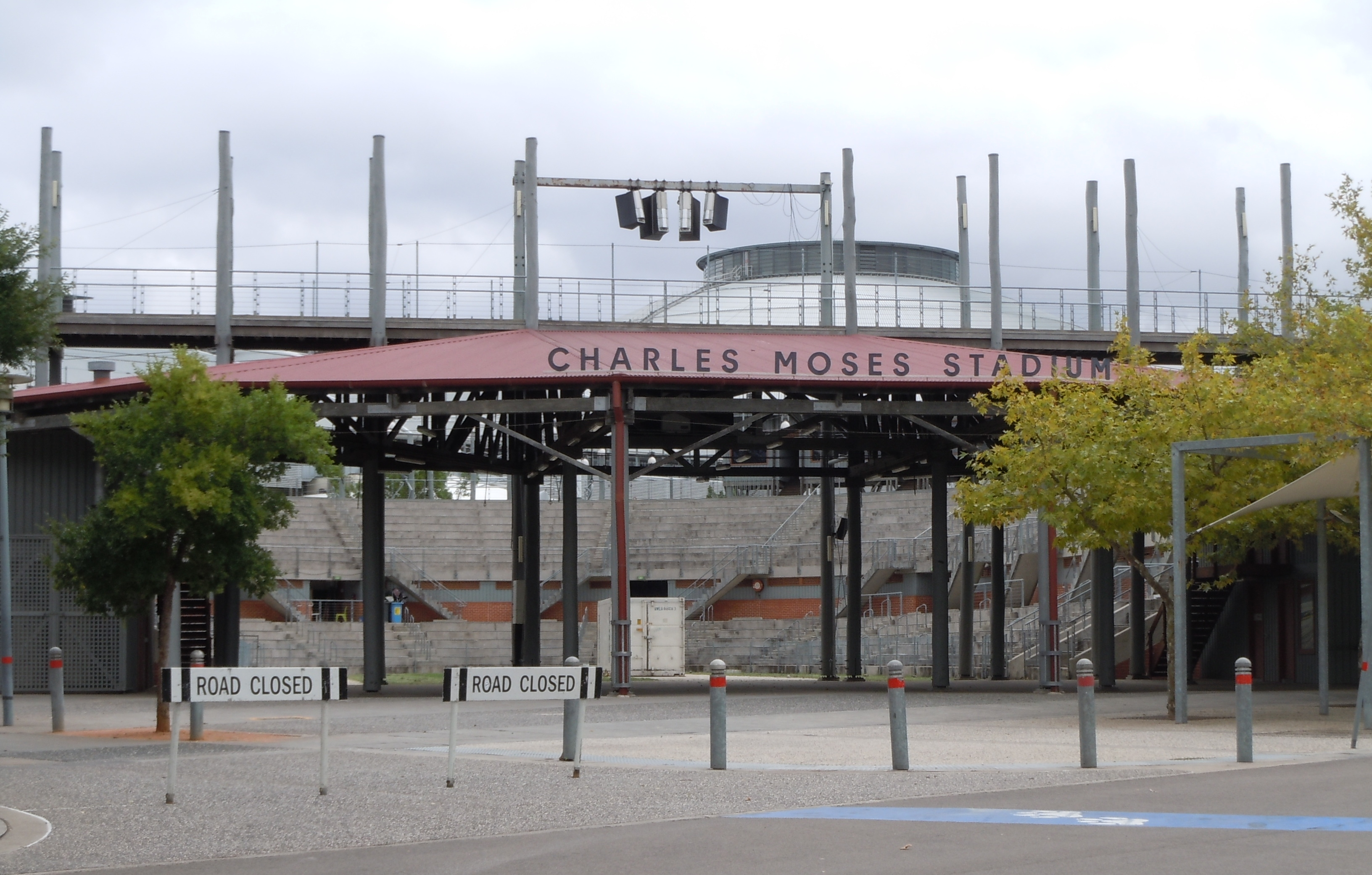
Charles Moses Stadium

Charles Moses Stadium is a U-shaped outdoor stadium. Features include tiered seating with a capacity of 3000, a video screen, PA system and corporate boxes. It is home to the Royal Easter Show's wood chopping events. It is named in honour of Charles Moses, the general manager of the Australian Broadcasting Commission from 1935 to 1965.
