= Russia at the 2000 Summer Olympics =

- IOC code: RUS
- NOC: Russian Olympic Committee
- Website: www.olympic.ru (in Russian)

in Sydney
- Competitors: 435 (241 men and 194 women) in 30 sports
- Flag bearer: Andrey Lavrov
- Medals Ranked 2nd: Gold 32 Silver 28 Bronze 29 Total 89

Summer Olympics appearances (overview)
- 1996; 2000; 2004; 2008; 2012; 2016; 2020–2024; 2028

Other related appearances
- Russian Empire (1900–1912); Soviet Union (1952–1988); Unified Team (1992); ROC (2020); Individual Neutral Athletes (2024)

Russia competed at the 2000 Summer Olympics in Sydney, Australia. 435 competitors, 241 men and 194 women, took part in 238 events in 30 sports.

As of 2021, this is Russia's best ever result in terms of gold medals and the second best in terms of overall medals (after 2004).

== Medalists ==
Medal	Name	Sport	Event
Gold	Sergey Klyugin	Athletics	Men's high jump
Gold	Irina Privalova	Athletics	Women's 400 metre hurdles
Gold	Yelena Yelesina	Athletics	Women's high jump
Gold	Oleg Saitov	Boxing	Welterweight
Gold	Aleksandr Lebziak	Boxing	Light heavyweight
Gold	Viatcheslav Ekimov	Cycling	Men's time trial
Gold	Igor Lukashin; Dmitri Sautin	Diving	Men's synchronized 10 metre platform
Gold	Vera Ilyina; Yuliya Pakhalina	Diving	Women's synchronized 3 metre springboard
Gold	Pavel Kolobkov	Fencing	Men's individual épée
Gold	Sergey Sharikov; Aleksey Frosin; Stanislav Pozdnyakov	Fencing	Men's team sabre
Gold	Karina Aznavourian, Oxana Ermakova; Tatiana Logounova, Maria Mazina	Fencing	Women's team épée
Gold	Alexei Nemov	Gymnastics	Men's individual all-around
Gold	Alexei Nemov	Gymnastics	Men's horizontal bar
Gold	Svetlana Khorkina	Gymnastics	Women's uneven bars
Gold	Elena Zamolodchikova	Gymnastics	Women's vault
Gold	Elena Zamolodchikova	Gymnastics	Women's floor
Gold	Yulia Barsukova	Gymnastics	Women's rhythmic individual all-around
Gold	Irina Belova, Yelena Chalamova; Natalia Lavrova, Mariya Netesova; Vyera Shimanskaya, Irina Zilber	Gymnastics	Women's rhythmic team all-around
Gold	Alexander Moskalenko	Gymnastics	Men's trampoline
Gold	Irina Karavayeva	Gymnastics	Women's trampoline
Gold	Dmitry Filippov, Vyacheslav Gorpishin; Oleg Khodkov, Eduard Koksharov; Denis Krivoshlykov, Vasily Kudinov; Stanislav Kulinchenko, Dmitry Kuzelev; Andrey Lavrov, Igor Lavrov; Sergey Pogorelov, Pavel Sukosyan; Dmitri Torgovanov, Aleksandr Tuchkin; Lev Voronin	Handball	Men's handball
Gold	Dmitri Svatkovskiy	Modern pentathlon	Men's individual
Gold	Sergei Alifirenko	Shooting	Men's 25 metre rapid fire pistol
Gold	Olga Brusnikina; Mariya Kiselyova	Synchronized swimming	Women's duet
Gold	Yelena Antonova, Yelena Azarova, Olga Brusnikina, Mariya Kiselyova, Olga Novokshchenova, Irina Pershina, Yelena Soya, Yuliya Vasilyeva, Olga Vasyukova	Synchronized swimming	Women's team
Gold	Yevgeny Kafelnikov	Tennis	Men's singles
Gold	Murad Umakhanov	Wrestling	Men's freestyle 63 kg
Gold	Adam Saitiev	Wrestling	Men's freestyle 85 kg
Gold	Sagid Murtazaliev	Wrestling	Men's freestyle 97 kg
Gold	David Musuľbes	Wrestling	Men's freestyle 130 kg
Gold	Varteres Samourgachev	Wrestling	Men's Greco-Roman 63 kg
Gold	Murat Kardanov	Wrestling	Men's Greco-Roman 76 kg
Silver	Olga Kuzenkova	Athletics	Women's hammer throw
Silver	Tatyana Lebedeva	Athletics	Women's triple jump
Silver	Larisa Peleshenko	Athletics	Women's shot put
Silver	Yelena Prokhorova	Athletics	Women's heptathlon
Silver	Raimkul Malakhbekov	Boxing	Bantamweight
Silver	Gaydarbek Gaydarbekov	Boxing	Middleweight
Silver	Sultan Ibragimov	Boxing	Heavyweight
Silver	Maxim Opalev	Canoeing	Men's C-1 1000 metres
Silver	Oksana Grishina	Cycling	Women's sprint
Silver	Aleksandr Dobroskok; Dmitri Sautin	Diving	Men's synchronized 3 metre springboard
Silver	Alexei Bondarenko	Gymnastics	Men's vault
Silver	Alexei Nemov	Gymnastics	Men's floor
Silver	Svetlana Khorkina	Gymnastics	Women's floor
Silver	Yekaterina Lobaznyuk	Gymnastics	Women's balance beam
Silver	Anna Chepeleva, Svetlana Khorkina; Anastasiya Kolesnikova, Yekaterina Lobaznyuk; Yelena Produnova, Elena Zamolodchikova	Gymnastics	Women's team all-around
Silver	Lyubov Bruletova	Judo	Women's 48 kg
Silver	Artem Khadjibekov	Shooting	Men's 10 metre air rifle
Silver	Svetlana Demina	Shooting	Women's skeet
Silver	Tatiana Goldobina	Shooting	Women's 50 metre rifle three positions
Silver	Alexander Popov	Swimming	Men's 100 metre freestyle
Silver	Natalia Ivanova	Taekwondo	Women's +67 kg
Silver	Elena Dementieva	Tennis	Women's singles
Silver	Aleksandr Gerasimov, Valeri Goryushev; Aleksey Kazakov, Vadim Khamuttskikh; Aleksey Kuleshov, Evgeni Mitkov; Ruslan Olikhver, Ilya Savelev; Igor Shulepov, Sergey Tetyukhin; Konstantin Ushakov, Roman Yakovlev	Volleyball	Men's volleyball
Silver	Yevgeniya Artamonova, Anastasiya Belikova; Lioubov Chachkova, Yekaterina Gamova; Yelena Godina, Tatyana Gracheva; Natalya Morozova, Olga Potachova; Inessa Sargsyan, Elizaveta Tishchenko; Elena Tyurina, Yelena Vasilevskaya	Volleyball	Women's volleyball
Silver	Roman Balashov, Dmitri Douguine; Serguei Garbouzov, Dmitry Gorshkov; Nikolay Kozlov, Nikolai Maximov; Andrei Reketchinski, Dmitri Stratan; Revaz Tchomakhidze, Yuri Yatsev; Alexander Yerishev, Marat Zakirov; Irek Zinnourov	Water polo	Men's water polo
Silver	Valentina Popova	Weightlifting	Women's 63 kg
Silver	Arsen Gitinov	Wrestling	Men's freestyle 69 kg
Silver	Alexander Karelin	Wrestling	Men's Greco-Roman 130 kg
Bronze	Vladimir Andreyev	Athletics	Men's 20 km walk
Bronze	Denis Kapustin	Athletics	Men's triple jump
Bronze	Sergey Makarov	Athletics	Men's javelin throw
Bronze	Maksim Tarasov	Athletics	Men's pole vault
Bronze	Tatyana Kotova	Athletics	Women's long jump
Bronze	Svetlana Goncharenko, Olga Kotlyarova; Natalya Nazarova, Irina Privalova; Yuliya Sotnikova, Olesya Zykina	Athletics	Women's 4 x 400 metre relay
Bronze	Kamil Djamaloudinov	Boxing	Featherweight
Bronze	Alexander Maletin	Boxing	Lightweight
Bronze	Alexei Markov	Cycling	Men's points race
Bronze	Olga Slyusareva	Cycling	Women's points race
Bronze	Dmitri Sautin	Diving	Men's 3 metre springboard
Bronze	Dmitri Sautin	Diving	Men's 10 metre platform
Bronze	Dmitriy Shevchenko	Fencing	Men's foil individual
Bronze	Alexei Nemov	Gymnastics	Men's pommel horse
Bronze	Alexei Nemov	Gymnastics	Men's parallel bars
Bronze	Maxim Aleshin, Alexei Bondarenko; Dmitri Drevin, Nikolai Kryukov; Alexei Nemov, Yevgeni Podgorny	Gymnastics	Men's team all-around
Bronze	Yekaterina Lobaznyuk	Gymnastics	Women's vault
Bronze	Yelena Produnova	Gymnastics	Women's balance beam
Bronze	Alina Kabayeva	Gymnastics	Women's rhythmic individual all-around
Bronze	Youri Stepkine	Judo	Men's 100 kg
Bronze	Tamerlan Tmenov	Judo	Men's +100 kg
Bronze	Oksana Dorodnova, Irina Fedotova; Yuliya Levina, Larisa Merk	Rowing	Women's quadruple sculls
Bronze	Yevgeni Aleinikov	Shooting	Men's 10 metre air rifle
Bronze	Maria Feklistova	Shooting	Women's 50 metre rifle three positions
Bronze	Roman Sloudnov	Swimming	Men's 100 metre breaststroke
Bronze	Marina Akobiya, Ekaterina Anikeeva; Sofia Konukh, Maria Koroleva; Natalia Kutuzova, Svetlana Kuzina; Tatiana Petrova, Yuliya Petrova; Galina Rytova, Elena Smurova; Elena Tokun, Irina Tolkunova; Ekaterina Vasilieva	Water polo	Women's water polo
Bronze	Aleksei Petrov	Weightlifting	Men's 94 kg
Bronze	Andrei Chemerkin	Weightlifting	Men's +105 kg
Bronze	Aleksei Glushkov	Wrestling	Men's Greco-Roman 69 kg

== Results by event ==
=== Archery ===
The Russian men came close to winning their first medal since beginning to compete individually when they won their semifinal in the team round and tied the United States in the bronze medal match. However, in the three-arrow tie-breaker, the Americans scored a 29 to the Russians' 26 to prevent them from winning a medal.

Men

Athlete	Event	Ranking Round		Round of 64	Round of 32	Round of 16	Quarterfinals	Semifinals	Final Bronze Final	
Athlete	Event	Score	Seed	Opposition Score	Opposition Score	Opposition Score	Opposition Score	Opposition Score	Opposition Score	Rank
Bair Badënov	Individual	618	39	Antonov (UKR) (26); L 153–164	Did not advance					52
Yuri Leontiev	Individual	617	40	de Grandis (FRA) (25); L 163–171	Did not advance					34
Balzhinima Tsyrempilov	Individual	635	17	Ebden (NZL) (48); W 168–147	Mikos (POL) (49); W 163–154	Jang (KOR) (1); W 167–164	Fairweather (AUS) (8); L 104–113	Did not advance		7
Bair Badënov; Yuri Leontiev; Balzhinima Tsyrempilov	Team	1870	12			Netherlands (5); W 248–241	Turkey (4); W 247–245	South Korea (1); L 229–240	Bronze medal final United States (2); L 239(+26)–239(+29)	4

Women

Athlete	Event	Ranking Round		Round of 64	Round of 32	Round of 16	Quarterfinals	Semifinals	Final Bronze Final	
Athlete	Event	Score	Seed	Opposition Score	Opposition Score	Opposition Score	Opposition Score	Opposition Score	Opposition Score	Rank
Natalia Bolotova	Individual	634	21	Psarra (GRE) (44); W 161–154	Lin (TPE) (12); W 158–157	Lecka (POL) (28); W 161–157	Yun (KOR) (4); L 105–110	Did not advance		6

=== Athletics ===
Men

Athlete	Events	Heat		Quarterfinal		Semifinal		Final	
Athlete	Events	Result	Rank	Result	Rank	Result	Rank	Result	Rank
Vladimir Andreyev	20 km walk							1:19.27	Bronze medal
Dmitriy Bogdanov	800 m	1:48.14	4			did not advance			
Aleksandr Borichevskiy	Discus throw	61.98	7					did not advance	
Yuriy Borzakovskiy	800 m	1:45.39	1 Q			1:44.33	2 Q	1:45.83	6
Pyotr Brayko	High jump	2.15	15					did not advance	
Danil Burkenya	Long jump	7.79	13					did not advance	
Sergey Bychkov	100 m	10.68	6	did not advance					
Pavel Chumachenko	Shot put	19.40	9					did not advance	
Pavel Gerasimov	Pole vault	5.40	13					did not advance	
Dmitriy Golovastov	400 m	45.90	4 q	45.66	5	did not advance			
Boris Gorban	400 m hurdles	49.44	2 Q			49.29	5	did not advance	
Dmitriy Kapitonov	Marathon							2:19:38	34
Denis Kapustin	Triple jump	17.04	4 Q					17.46	Bronze medal
Andrey Kislykh	110 m hurdles	13.77	2 Q	14.03	5	did not advance			
Sergey Klyugin	High jump	2.27	3 q					2.35	Gold medal
Pavel Kokin	Marathon							2:18:02	26
Ilya Konovalov	Hammer throw	77.07	6 q					78.56	5
Lev Lobodin	Decathlon							8071	13
Sergey Makarov	Javelin throw	85.60	3 Q					88.67	Bronze medal
Dmitry Maksimov	10000 m	28:54.15	16					did not advance	
Vladimir Malyavin	Long jump	8.03	5 q					7.67	12
Gennadiy Markov	Triple jump	16.36	13					did not advance	
Ilya Markov	20 km walk							1:23.03	15
Ruslan Mashchenko	400 m hurdles	50.01	3 q			48.94	3	did not advance	
Artem Mastrov	800 m	1:49.89	6			did not advance			
Nikolay Matyukhin	50 km walk							3:46.37	5
Vladimir Ovchinnikov	Javelin throw	82.10	7					did not advance	
Evgeny Pechenkin	110 m hurdles	13.56	2 Q	13.63	4 Q	13.62	7	did not advance	
Vladimir Potemin	50 km walk							4:02.38	26
Vladimir Pronin	3000 m steeplechase	8:57.69	13					did not advance	
Roman Rasskazov	20 km walk							1:20.57	6
Roman Razbeyko	Decathlon							Did Not Finish	
Aleksandr Ryabov	200 m	21.02	5	did not advance					
Vyacheslav Shabunin	1500 m	3:41.52	9			did not advance			
Dmitriy Shevchenko	Discus throw	65.29	4 Q					62.65	11
Vladislav Shiryayev	400 m hurdles	50.39	3			did not advance			
Vasiliy Sidorenko	Hammer throw	74.72	10					did not advance	
Vitaliy Sidorov	Discus throw	60.65	15					did not advance	
Yevgeniy Smiryagin	Pole vault	5.65	3 q					5.50	10
Kirill Sosunov	Long jump	7.97	10					did not advance	
Igor Spasovkhodskiy	Triple jump	15.79	15					did not advance	
Valeriy Spitsyn	50 km walk							Did Not Finish	
Maksim Tarasov	Pole vault	5.65	5 q					5.90	Bronze medal
Vyacheslav Voronin	High jump	2.27	1 q					2.29	10
Aleksey Zagornyi	Hammer throw	74.63	11					did not advance	
Sergey Bychkov; Aleksandr Ryabov; Aleksandr Smirnov; Dmitri Vasilyev	4 × 100 m relay	39.29	4			did not advance			
Dmitriy Bogdanov; Dmitriy Golovastov; Ruslan Mashchenko; Andrey Semyonov	4 × 400 m relay	3:05.37	2 Q			3:02.28	4	did not advance	

Women

Athlete	Events	Heat		Quarterfinal		Semifinal		Final	
Athlete	Events	Result	Rank	Result	Rank	Result	Rank	Result	Rank
Yelena Belyakova	Pole vault	No Mark						did not advance	
Madina Biktagirova	Marathon							2:26:33	5
Lyudmila Biktasheva	10000 m	32:52.00	9 q					31:47.10	13
Galina Bogomolova	10000 m	34:06.21	16					did not advance	
Natalia Chulkova	400 m hurdles	Did Not Finish				did not advance			
Alla Davydova	Hammer throw	60.86	10					did not advance	
Oxana Ekk	200 m	23.17	4 Q	23.17	6	did not advance			
Oksana Esipchuk	Discus throw	59.51	8					did not advance	
Svetlana Feofanova	Pole vault	No Mark						did not advance	
Lyudmila Galkina	Long jump	6.62	5 q					6.56	9
Natalya Gorelova	1500 m	4:12.84	10			did not advance			
Yuliya Graudyn	100 m hurdles	12.98	4 Q	Did Not Finish		did not advance			
Lidiya Grigoryeva	10000 m	32:44.43	9 q					31:21.27	9
Tatyana Gudkova	20 km walk							1:32.35	8
Natalya Ignatova	100 m	11.54	3 Q	11.47	6	did not advance			
Yelena Isinbayeva	Pole vault	No Mark						did not advance	
Yekaterina Ivakina	Javelin throw	55.58	10					did not advance	
Irina Khabarova	200 m	23.21	3 Q	23.27	6	did not advance			
Tatyana Konstantinova	Hammer throw	61.48	8					did not advance	
Diana Koritskaya	Heptathlon							5975	15
Larisa Korotkevich	Discus throw	58.81	10					did not advance	
Olga Kotlyarova	400 m	51.99	2 Q	50.97	3 Q	51.21	4 Q	51.04	8
Tatyana Kotova	Long jump	6.66	5 q					6.83	Bronze medal
Svetlana Krivelyova	Shot put	18.56	3 Q					19.37	4
Marina Kuptsova	High jump	1.85	13					did not advance	
Olga Kuzenkova	Hammer throw	70.60	1 Q					69.77	Silver medal
Svetlana Lapina	High jump	1.92	8					did not advance	
Inna Lasovskaya	Triple jump	13.75	9					did not advance	
Svetlana Laukhova	100 m hurdles	12.98	3 Q	12.96	4 Q	12.95	5	did not advance	
Tatyana Lebedeva	Triple jump	14.91	1 Q					15.00	Silver medal
Svetlana Masterkova	1500 m	Did Not Finish				did not advance			
Irina Mistyukevich	800 m	1:59.73	2 Q			2:02.95	7	did not advance	
Lyubov Morgunova	Marathon							2:32:35	23
Natalya Nazarova	400 m	52.05	2 Q	51.44	4 Q	51.83	6	did not advance	
Yuliya Nosova	400 m hurdles	56.11	4 q			56.58	8	did not advance	
Larisa Peleshenko	Shot put	19.08	3 Q					19.92	Silver medal
Olga Polyakova	20 km walk							Did Not Finish	
Svetlana Pospelova	400 m	53.34	4	did not advance					
Irina Privalova	400 m hurdles	55.89	1 Q			54.02	1 Q	53.02	Gold medal
Yelena Prokhorova	Heptathlon							6531	Silver medal
Olga Raspopova	800 m	2:01.95	3			did not advance			
Lyudmila Rogachova	1500 m	4:09.81	9 q			4:09.18	9	did not advance	
Oksana Rogova	Triple jump	14.25	4 Q					13.97	8
Natalya Roshchupkina	Heptathlon							6237	6
Olga Rublyova	Long jump	6.65	6 q					6.79	5
Olga Ryabinkina	Shot put	19.20	2 Q					17.85	10
Natalya Sadova	Discus throw	64.62	1 Q					65.00	4
Natalya Shekhodanova	100 m hurdles	13.15	3 Q	12.96	4 Q	12.92	5	did not advance	
Tatyana Shikolenko	Javelin throw	61.54	3 Q					62.91	7
Irina Stankina	20 km walk							Did Not Finish	
Tatyana Tomashova	5000 m	15:08.92	3 Q					15:01.28	13
Marina Trandenkova	100 m	11.51	4	did not advance					
Marina Trandenkova	200 m	23.31	4 Q	23.10	5	did not advance			
Natalya Tsyganova	800 m	2:02.26	3			did not advance			
Natalya Pomoshchnikova-Voronova	100 m	11.47	4	did not advance					
Olga Yegorova	5000 m	15:14.34	3 Q					14:50.31	8
Valentina Yegorova	Marathon							Did Not Finish	
Yelena Yelesina	High jump	1.94	1 Q					2.01	Gold medal
Natalya Ignatova; Irina Khabarova; Marina Kislova; Marina Trandenkova; Natalya Pomoshchnikova-Voronova	4 × 100 m relay	43.15	2 Q			42.84	4 q	43.02	5
Svetlana Goncharenko; Olga Kotlyarova; Natalya Nazarova; Irina Privalova; Yuliya Sotnikova; Olesya Zykina	4 × 400 m relay	3:26.05	3 q					3:23.46	Bronze medal

=== Badminton ===
Women

Athlete	Event	Round of 64	Round of 32	Round of 16	Quarterfinals	Semifinals	Final	
Athlete	Event	Opposition Score	Opposition Score	Opposition Score	Opposition Score	Opposition Score	Opposition Score	Rank
Marina Yakusheva	Singles		Mizui (JPN) (8); L 10–11, 6–11	Did not advance				
Ella Karachkova	Singles		Dai (CHN) (3); L 3–11, 5–11	Did not advance				
Irina Ruslyakova; Marina Yakusheva	Doubles		Igawa (JPN); Nagamine (JPN); W 15–9, 15–11	Kirkegaard (DEN); Olsen (DEN) (5); L 16–17, 5–15	Did not advance			

=== Basketball ===
Men's team

Russia National Basketball Team roster
Players
Coaches

Pos.	No.	Name	Age – Date of birth	Height	Club	Ctr.
G	4	Sergei Chikalkin	24 – 11 December 1975	6 ft 5 in (1.96 m)
G	5	Valentin Kubrakov	28 – 25 July 1972	6 ft 5 in (1.96 m)
C	6	Aleksandr Bashminov	22 – 7 May 1978	6 ft 11 in (2.11 m)
F	7	Yevgeni Kisurin	31 – 28 January 1969	6 ft 9 in (2.06 m)
F/C	8	Nikita Morgunov	25 – 29 June 1975	6 ft 11 in (2.11 m)
G	9	Sergei Bazarevich	35 – 16 March 1965	6 ft 3 in (1.91 m)
G	10	Evgeniy Pashutin	31 – 6 February 1969	6 ft 3 in (1.91 m)
SG	11	Zakhar Pashutin	26 – 3 May 1974	6 ft 5 in (1.96 m)
F	12	Andrei Fetisov	28 – 19 January 1972	6 ft 10 in (2.08 m)
SF	13	Andrei Kirilenko	19 – 18 February 1981	6 ft 9 in (2.06 m)
F	14	Sergei Panov	30 – 30 June 1970	6 ft 8 in (2.03 m)
F	15	Ruslan Avleev	24 – 4 June 1976	6 ft 7 in (2.01 m)

Head coach

- (Russia) Stanislav Eremin

Legend

- (C) Team captain
- nat field describes country
  of last club
  before the tournament
- Age field is age on 17 September 2000

Qualified for the quarterfinals

Preliminary round

Team	Pld	W	L	PF	PA	PD	Pts	Tiebreaker
Canada	5	4	1	433	373	+60	9	1-0
FR Yugoslavia	5	4	1	372	338	+34	9	0-1
Australia	5	3	2	408	407	+1	8	1-0
Russia	5	3	2	367	328	+39	8	0-1
Spain	5	1	4	349	376	-27	6	
Angola	5	0	5	303	410	-107	5	

17 September
14:30

FR Yugoslavia	66–60	Russia
Scoring by half: 27–28, 39–32
Pts: Rebrača 18; Rebs: Drobnjak 6 Asts: Obradović, Lukovski 3		Pts: Panov 13; Rebs: E. Pashutin, Kirilenko, Panov 5 Asts: Chikalkin, E. Pashutin, Kirilenko 2

Attendance: 8,353

19 September
14:30

Russia	71–63	Spain
Scoring by half: 38–28, 33–35
Pts: Chikalkin 23; Rebs: Kirilenko 9 Asts: E. Pashutin 5		Pts: Herreros Ros 13; Rebs: Rogers Bakker 6 Asts: Herreros Ros 2

Attendance: 8,368

21 September
21:30

Australia	75–71	Russia
Scoring by half: 47–30, 28–41
Pts: Gaze, Heal 15; Rebs: Mackinnon 8 Asts: Mackinnon, Longley 5		Pts: Fetisov 16; Rebs: Bashminov, Morgunov, Fetisov, Panov, Avleev 5 Asts: E. Pashutin 7

Attendance: 8,322

23 September
14:30

Russia	77–59	Canada
Scoring by half: 45–36, 32–23
Pts: Fetisov 15; Rebs: E. Pashutin 7 Asts: E. Pashutin 12		Pts: Nash 15; Rebs: Mavis, Nash, Guarasci 5 Asts: Nash 4

Attendance: 8,446

25 September
09:30

Angola	65–88	Russia
Scoring by half: 35–45, 30–43
Pts: Dias 14; Rebs: Dias 6 Asts: Victoriano 3		Pts: Morgunov 17; Rebs: Kirilenko 9 Asts: Bazarevich, E. Pashutin 5

Attendance: 8,435

Quarterfinal

28 September
22:00

United States	85–70	Russia
Scoring by quarter: 22–22, 24–19, 21–14, 18–15
Pts: Garnett 16; Rebs: Garnett 11; Asts: Kidd 8		Pts: Bashminov 12; Rebs: Morgunov 6 Asts: E. Pashutin 6

Sydney SuperDome
Attendance: 14,260
Referees: Iztok Rems (Slovenia),
Rick Degagne (Canada)

Classification 7-8

30 September
12:00

Canada	86–83 (OT) (OT)	Russia
Scoring by quarter: 16–24, 20–19, 21–6, 12–20, Overtime: 17–14
Pts: Guarasci 21; Rebs: Meeks 10; Asts: Hamilton 5		Pts: Z. Pashutin 23; Rebs: Z. Pashutin 8 Asts: Z. Pashutin 5

Sydney SuperDome
Attendance: 14,604
Referees: Bill Mildenhall (Australia)
Petr Sudek (Slovakia)

Women's team

Russia National Basketball Team roster
Players
Coaches

Pos.	No.	Name	Age – Date of birth	Height	Club	Ctr.
G	4	Yevgeniya Nikonova	29 – 1 November 1970	5 ft 9 in (1.75 m)
F	5	Yelena Pshikova	27 – 20 February 1973	6 ft 1 in (1.85 m)
G	6	Irina Rutkovskaya	31 – 14 January 1969	5 ft 9 in (1.75 m)
F	7	Olga Arteshina	17 – 27 November 1982	6 ft 0 in (1.83 m)
F	8	Svetlana Abrosimova	20 – 9 July 1980	6 ft 2 in (1.88 m)
F	9	Yulia Skopa	22 – 15 March 1978	6 ft 1 in (1.85 m)
C	10	Yelena Khudashova	35 – 10 July 1965	6 ft 5 in (1.96 m)
C	11	Maria Stepanova	21 – 23 February 1979	6 ft 8 in (2.03 m)
G	12	Irina Sumnikova	35 – 15 October 1964	5 ft 7 in (1.7 m)
C	13	Elen Shakirova	30 – 2 June 1970	6 ft 3 in (1.91 m)
C	14	Natalya Zasulskaya	31 – 28 May 1969	6 ft 3 in (1.91 m)
G	15	Anna Arkhipova	27 – 27 July 1973	5 ft 10 in (1.78 m)

Head coach

- (Russia) Yevgeni Gomelsky

Legend

- (C) Team captain
- nat field describes country
  of last club
  before the tournament
- Age field is age on 16 September 2000

Qualified for the quarterfinals

Preliminary round

Team	Pld	W	L	PF	PA	PD	Pts	Tiebreaker
United States	5	5	0	436	312	+124	10	
Russia	5	3	2	398	325	+73	8	1-1
South Korea	5	3	2	382	357	+25	8	1-1
Poland	5	3	2	327	339	-12	8	1-1
Cuba	5	1	4	318	358	-40	6	
New Zealand	5	0	5	265	435	-170	5	

16 September
19:30

Cuba	62–72	Russia
Scoring by half: 33–38, 29–34
Pts: Martínez Calderón 16; Rebs: Martínez Calderón 6 Asts: Castillo 5		Pts: Zasulskaya 18; Rebs: Abrosimova, Sumnikova, Zasulskaya 5 Asts: Shakirova, Arkhipova 3

18 September
11:30

Russia	84–46	Poland
Scoring by half: 34–20, 50–26
Pts: Khudashova 13; Rebs: Shakirova 9 Asts: Nikonova 4		Pts: Trześniewska 10; Rebs: Dydek 8 Asts: Predehl, Wlaźlak 2

Attendance: 4,315

20 September
16:30

United States	88–77	Russia
Scoring by half: 44–47, 44–30
Pts: Leslie 18; Rebs: Griffith 11; Asts: Edwards, Swoopes 3		Pts: Arkhipova 15; Rebs: Zasulskaya 6 Asts: Zasulskaya 5

Attendance: 8,383

22 September
09:30

Russia	73–75 (OT) (OT)	South Korea
Scoring by half: 37–34, 32–35 Overtime: 4–6
Pts: Abrosimova 17; Rebs: Khudashova 7 Asts: Abrosimova 6		Pts: Chun 22; Rebs: Chun, Chung 4 Asts: Chung 10

Attendance: 6,006

24 September
11:30

New Zealand	54–92	Russia
Scoring by half: 28–41, 26–51
Pts: Ofsoski 11; Rebs: Ofsoski 5 Asts: Daly, Farmer, Ofsoski 2		Pts: Rutkovskaya 19; Rebs: Khudashova 9 Asts: Abrosimova 5

Attendance: 8,308

Quarterfinal

27 September
17:00

Russia	67–68	Brazil
Scoring by quarter: 24–19, 15–19, 15–18, 13–12
Pts: Pshikova 18; Rebs: Zasulskaya 6 Asts: Arkhipova 5		Pts: Oliveira 17; Rebs: Arcain 9 Asts: Neves, Luz 4

Sydney SuperDome
Attendance: 14,381
Referees: Carl Jungebrand (Finland),
Mike Thomson (Canada)

Classification 5-6

29 September
11:30

France	71–59	Russia
Scoring by quarter: 16–9, 14–18, 17–11, 24–21
Pts: Sauret 17; Rebs: Fijalkowski 6 Asts: Melain 4		Pts: Nikonova 18; Rebs: Pshikova, Stepanova, Zasulskaya 5 Asts: Arkhipova 4

Sydney SuperDome
Attendance: 14,260
Referees: Bill Mildenhall (Australia)
David Jones (USA)

=== Boxing ===
Athlete	Event	Round of 32	Round of 16	Quarterfinals	Semifinals	Final	Rank
Athlete	Event	Opposition Result	Opposition Result	Opposition Result	Opposition Result	Opposition Result	Rank
Sergey Kazakov	Light flyweight	Viloria (USA); L 6–8	Did not advance				
Ilfat Raziapov	Flyweight		Darchinyan (ARM); L 11–20	Did not advance			
Raimkul Malakhbekov	Bantamweight	Labarda (ARG); W RSCO	Khurtsilava (GEO); W 13–7	Rahimov (UZB); W 16–10	Danylchenko (UKR); W 15–10	Rigondeaux (CUB); L 12–18	2nd place, silver medalist(s)
Kamil Djamaloudinov	Featherweight	Bičiulaitis (LTU); W 9–5	Bojado (MEX); W 15–12	Aguilera (CUB); W 17–12	Juarez (USA); L 12–23	Did not advance	3rd place, bronze medalist(s)
Alexander Maletin	Lightweight	Nuriddinovun (AZE); W 14–5	López (VEN); W RSCO	Palyani (TUR); W RSCO	Kindelán (CUB); L 15–27	Did not advance	[ (bronze)
Aleksandr Leonov	Light welterweight	Khelifi (TUN); W 14–9	Hwang (KOR); W 14–10	Williams (USA); L 12–17	Did not advance		
Oleg Saitov	Welterweight		Calderón (COL); W 15–1	Khairov (AZE); W +10-10	Simion (ROU); W 19–10	Dotsenko (UKR); W 24–16	1st place, gold medalist(s)
Andrey Mishin	Light middleweight	Esther (FRA); L 11–16	Did not advance				
Gaydarbek Gaydarbekov	Middleweight	Haydarov (UZB); W 11–10	Eromosele (NGR); W 15–9	Lacy (USA); W RSCO	Erdei (HUN); W 24–16	Gutiérrez (CUB); L 15–17	2nd place, silver medalist(s)
Aleksandr Lebziak	Light heavyweight	Fall (SEN); W RSCO	Green (AUS); W RSCO	Dovi (FRA); W 13–11	Mihaylov (UZB); W RSCO	Kraj (CZE); W 20–6	1st place, gold medalist(s)
Sultan Ibragimov	Heavyweight		Lalau (SAM); W RSHC	Chanet (FRA); W 18–13	Chanturia (GEO); W 19–4	Savón (CUB); L 13–21	2nd place, silver medalist(s)
Alexei Lezin	Super heavyweight		Harrison (GBR); L RSC	Did not advance			

=== Canoeing ===
==== Flatwater ====
Men

Athlete	Event	Heats		Semifinals		Final	
Athlete	Event	Time	Rank	Time	Rank	Time	Rank
Anatoli Tishchenko	K-1 500 m	1:44.707	5 QS	1:42.548	5	Did not advance	
Aleksandr Ivanik; Roman Zarubin	K-2 500 m	1:35.212	6 QS	1:32.963	5	Did not advance	
Oleg Gorobiy; Yevgeni Salakhov	K-2 1000 m	3:17.067	7 QS	3:17.114	1 QF	3:18.937	7
Oleg Gorobiy; Yevgeni Salakhov; Anatoli Tishchenko; Roman Zarubin	K-4 1000 m	2:59.764	2 QF			2:59.778	7
Maxim Opalev	C-1 500 m	4:00.568	6 QS	4:01.222	6 QF	3:58.813	6
Maxim Opalev	C-1 1000 m	1:51.048	1 QF			2:25.809	Silver medal
Aleksandr Kostoglod; Aleksandr Kovalyov	C-2 500 m	1:47.682	6 QS	1:44.981	1 QF	2:00.134	6
Aleksandr Kostoglod; Aleksandr Kovalyov	C-2 1000 m	3:37.163	1 QF			3:41.267	4

Women

Athlete	Event	Heats		Semifinals		Final	
Athlete	Event	Time	Rank	Time	Rank	Time	Rank
Natalya Gouilly; Yelena Tissina	K-2 500 m	1:47.356	6 QS	1:46.554	3 QF	2:04.994	9
Natalya Gouilly; Galina Poryvayeva; Olga Tishchenko; Yelena Tissina	K-4 500 m	1:36.870	5 QS	1:38.262	3 QF	1:38.624	7

=== Cycling ===
==== Mountain biking ====
Men

Athlete	Event	Time	Rank
Pavel Cherkassov	Cross-country	2:17:21.92 (+ 8:19.42)	20

Women

Athlete	Event	Time	Rank
Alla Yepifanova	Cross-country	1:50:45.43 (+ 1:21.05)	4

==== Road ====
Men

Athlete	Event	Time	Rank
Viatcheslav Ekimov	Time trial	57:40	1st place, gold medalist(s)
Viatcheslav Ekimov	Road race	5:34:58 (5:50)	75
Sergei Ivanov	Road race	5:30:46 (1:38)	36
Dimitri Konyshev	Road race	5:30:34 (1:26)	10
Evgeni Petrov	Time trial	59:40 (2:00)	14
Evgeni Petrov	Road race	Did Not Finish	
Pavel Tonkov	Road race	5:30:46 (1:38)	29

Women

Athlete	Event	Time	Rank
Svetlana Bubnenkova	Road race	3:06:31 (0:00)	5
Olga Slyusareva	Time trial	45:51 (3:51)	23
Olga Slyusareva	Road race	3:13:27 (6:56)	42
Zulfiya Zabirova	Time trial	44:22 (2:22)	12
Zulfiya Zabirova	Road race	3:06:31 (0:00)	7

==== Track ====
Sprints

Athlete	Event	Qualifying		1/8 Finals	1/8 Finals Repechage	Quarterfinals	Semifinals	Finals	
Athlete	Event	Time Speed	Rank	Opposition Time Speed	Opposition Time Speed	Opposition Time Speed	Opposition Time Speed	Opposition Time Speed	Rank
Oksana Grishina	Women's sprint	11.439	2	Ramage (NZL); W 12.195; 59.041		Szabolcsi (HUN); W 12.545, W 12.885	Yanovych (UKR); W 12.594, W 12.726	Ballanger (FRA); L, W 13.112, L	2nd place, silver medalist(s)

Pursuits

Athlete	Event	Qualifying		First Round		Semifinals		Finals	
Athlete	Event	Time	Rank	Opposition Time	Rank	Opposition Time	Rank	Opposition Time	Rank
Vladimir Karpets	Men's individual pursuit	4:31.342	11			Did not advance			
Alexei Markov	Men's individual pursuit	4:31.589	13			Did not advance			
Vladimir Karpets; Alexei Markov; Vladislav Borisov; Denis Smyslov; Serguei Klimov	Men's team pursuit	4:09.910	8	Great Britain	OVL	Did not advance			
Natalia Karimova	Women's individual pursuit	3:41.627	9			Did not advance			

Time trials

Athlete	Event	Time Speed	Rank
Oksana Grishina	Women's track time trial	36.169; 49.766	15

Points Races

Athlete	Event	Points/Laps	Rank
Alexei Markov	Men's points race	16 / -1	3rd place, bronze medalist(s)
Olga Slyusareva	Women's points race	15 / 0	3rd place, bronze medalist(s)
Anton Shantyr; Eduard Gritsun	Men's madison	5 / -2	14

=== Diving ===
Russia competed in all of the diving events at the 2000 Sydney Olympics and won two gold medals, one silver medal and two bronze medals.

Men

Athlete	Events	Preliminary		Semifinal				Final			
Athlete	Events	Points	Rank	Points	Rank	Points (prelim+semi)	Rank	Points	Rank	Points (semi+final)	Rank
Aleksandr Dobroskok	3 m Individual Springboard	377.34	17 Q	221.28	11	598.62	13	Did not advance			
Igor Lukashin	10 m Individual Platform	432.15	11 Q	179.94	15	612.09	11	444.57	7	624.51	7
Dmitri Sautin	3 m Individual Springboard	444.51	3 Q	240.24	1	684.75	2 Q	462.96	3	703.20	Bronze medal
Dmitri Sautin	10 m Individual Platform	471.27	3 Q	190.92	5	662.19	3 Q	488.34	3	679.26	Bronze medal
Aleksandr Dobroskok; Dmitri Sautin	3 m Synchronised Springboard									329.97	Silver medal
Igor Lukashin; Dmitri Sautin	10 m Synchronised Platform									365.04	Gold medal

Women

Athlete	Events	Preliminary		Semifinal				Final			
Athlete	Events	Points	Rank	Points	Rank	Points (prelim+semi)	Rank	Points	Rank	Points (semi+final)	Rank
Vera Ilyina	3 m Individual Springboard	305.25	5 Q	237.81	3	543.06	4 Q	317.34	7	555.15	6
Yevgeniya Olshevskaya	10 m Individual Platform	271.05	18 Q	166.98	11	438.03	16 Q	Did not advance			
Yuliya Pakhalina	3 m Individual Springboard	316.08	3 Q	236.43	4	552.51	3 Q	333.99	4	570.42	4
Svetlana Timoshinina	10 m Individual Platform	309.21	7 Q	160.47	15	469.68	9 Q	318.42	5	478.89	8
Vera Ilyina; Yuliya Pakhalina	3 m Synchronised Springboard									332.64	Gold medal
Yevgeniya Olshevskaya; Svetlana Timoshinina	10 m Synchronised Platform									288.30	6

=== Equestrian ===
Dressage

Athlete	Horse	Event	Round 1		Round 2				Final			
Athlete	Horse	Event	Score	Rank	Score	Rank	Total Score	Rank	Score	Rank	Total Score	Rank
Svetlana Knyazeva	Russian Dance	Individual	63.12	39	Did not advance							
Elena Sidneva	Podkhod	Individual	65.76	23 Q	63.67	24	129.43	24	Did not advance			

=== Fencing ===
Men

Athlete	Event	Round of 64	Round of 32	Round of 16	Quarterfinals	Semifinals	Final	Rank
Athlete	Event	Opposition Score	Opposition Score	Opposition Score	Opposition Score	Opposition Score	Opposition Score	Rank
Sergey Sharikov (3)	Individual sabre		Lukashenko (UKR) (30); W 15–11	Kothny (GER) (14); L 14–15	Did not advance			10
Andrei Deev (22)	Individual foil		Breutner (GER) (11); L 10–15	Did not advance				25
Aleksey Frosin (11)	Individual sabre		Sobala (POL) (22); W 15–12	Williams (GBR) (27); W 15–8	Kothny (GER) (14); L 12–15	Did not advance		6
Pavel Kolobkov (1)	Individual épée		Loit (EST) (33); W 15–9	Lee (KOR) (17); W 15–8	Trevejo (CUB) (9); W 15–14	Lee (KOR) (20); W 13–9	Obry (FRA) (22); W 15–12	Gold medal
Ilgar Mamedov (16)	Individual foil		Rodríguez (VEN) (17); L 14–15	Did not advance				21
Stanislav Pozdnyakov (1)	Individual sabre		Zhao (CHN) (33); W 15–11	Gourdain (FRA) (17); L 11–15	Did not advance			9
Dmitriy Shevchenko (9)	Individual foil		Krzesinski (POL) (24); W 15–8	Gregory (CUB) (8); W 15–14	Sanzo (ITA) (1); W 15–14	Kim (KOR) (5); L 14–15	Bronze medal final Ferrari (FRA) (3); W 15–14	
Andrey Deyev; Aleksandr Lakatosh; Ilgar Mamedov; Dmitriy Shevchenko (2)	Team foil				China (7); L 30–45	Classification 5 - 8 Ukraine (6); L 36–45	Classification 7 - 8 Cuba (5); L 39–45	8
Sergey Sharikov; Aleksey Frosin; Stanislav Pozdnyakov (4)	Team sabre				Hungary (5); W 45–39	Romania (1); W 45–28	France (2); W 45–32	Gold medal

Women

Athlete	Event	Round of 64	Round of 32	Round of 16	Quarterfinals	Semifinals	Final	Rank
Athlete	Event	Opposition Score	Opposition Score	Opposition Score	Opposition Score	Opposition Score	Opposition Score	Rank
Karina Aznavourian (26)	Individual épée	Goncharova (KAZ) (39); W 15–13	Mazina (RUS) (7); L 11–15	Did not advance				28
Svetlana Boyko (11)	Individual foil		Miroczkiewicz (POL) (22); L 9–15	Did not advance				19
Tatiana Logunova (13)	Individual épée		Ko (KOR) (20); W 15–9	Lamon (SUI) (29); W 15–8	Barlois-Leroux (FRA) (5); W 15–10	Hablützel-Bürki (SUI) (17); L 12–13	Bronze medal final Flessel-Colovic (FRA) (2); L 6–15	4
Maria Mazina (7)	Individual épée		Aznavourian (RUS) (26); W 15–11	Zalaffi (ITA) (10); L 13–15	Did not advance			11
Olga Sharkova (19)	Individual foil		Zimmermann (USA) (14); L 13–15	Did not advance				23
Yekaterina Yusheva (8)	Individual foil		Marsh (USA) (25); L 9–15	Did not advance				17
Svetlana Boyko; Olga Sharkova; Yekaterina Yusheva (7)	Team foil				Germany (2); L 35–38	Classification 5 - 8 China (3); W 45–33	Classification 5 - 6 Hungary (4); W 45–38	5
Karina Aznavourian; Oksana Yermakova; Tatiana Logunova; Maria Mazina (4)	Team épée				Germany (5); W 45–43	Hungary (1); W 45–44	Switzerland (3); W 45–35	Gold medal

=== Gymnastics ===
==== Artistic ====
Men

Athlete	Event	Apparatus						Final	
Athlete	Event	Floor	Pommel horse	Rings	Vault	Parallel bars	Horizontal bar	Total	Rank
Maxim Aleshin	Qualification	9.287	9.100	9.575	9.575	8.950	9.787	56.274	24 Q
Maxim Aleshin	All-around	9.325	9.000	9.412	9.412	9.550	9.700	56.399	19
Alexei Bondarenko	Qualification	9.475	9.712	9.600	9.750 Q	9.525	9.750 Q	57.812	3 Q
Alexei Bondarenko	All-around	9.637	9.725	9.712	9.400	9.675	9.775	57.924	7
Alexei Bondarenko	Vault				9.587			9.587	Silver medal
Alexei Bondarenko	Horizontal bar						9.762	9.762	4
Dmitri Drevin	Qualification	9.225						9.225	96
Nikolai Kryukov	Qualification		9.750 Q	9.537	9.612	8.812	9.625	47.336	56
Nikolai Kryukov	Pommel horse		9.700					9.700	8
Alexei Nemov	Qualification	9.800 Q	9.787 Q	9.600	9.712 Q	9.675 Q	9.787 Q	58.361	1 Q
Alexei Nemov	All-around	9.800	9.775	9.687	9.650	9.775	9.787	58.474	Gold medal
Alexei Nemov	Floor	9.800						9.800	Silver medal
Alexei Nemov	Pommel horse		9.800					9.800	Bronze medal
Alexei Nemov	Vault				9.456			9.456	4
Alexei Nemov	Parallel bars					9.800		9.800	Bronze medal
Alexei Nemov	Horizontal bar						9.787	9.787	Gold medal
Yevgeni Podgorny	Qualification	9.625 Q	9.125	9.462	9.387	9.512	9.162	56.273	25
Yevgeni Podgorny	Floor	8.550						8.550	8
Maxim Aleshin; Alexei Bondarenko; Dmitri Drevin; Nikolai Kryukov; Alexei Nemov; Yevgeni Podgorny	Qualification	38.187	38.374	38.312	38.649	37.662	38.949	230.133	1 Q
Maxim Aleshin; Alexei Bondarenko; Dmitri Drevin; Nikolai Kryukov; Alexei Nemov; Yevgeni Podgorny	Team	38.037	37.974	38.487	38.736	38.411	38.374	230.019	Bronze medal

Women

Athlete	Event	Apparatus				Final	
Athlete	Event	Vault	Uneven Bars	Balance Beam	Floor	Total	Rank
Anna Chepeleva	Qualification	9.474			9.425	18.899	84
Svetlana Khorkina	Qualification	9.731	9.850 Q	9.662	9.762 Q	39.005	1 Q
Svetlana Khorkina	All-around	9.343	9.012	9.762	9.812	37.929	10
Svetlana Khorkina	Uneven bars		9.862			9.862	Gold medal
Svetlana Khorkina	Floor				9.812	9.812	Silver medal
Anastasiya Kolesnikova	Qualification		9.625	9.587		19.212	81
Yekaterina Lobaznyuk	Qualification	9.637 Q	9.675	9.762 Q	9.612	38.686	4 Q
Yekaterina Lobaznyuk	All-around	9.693	9.700	9.425	9.575	38.393	4
Yekaterina Lobaznyuk	Vault	9.674				9.674	Bronze medal
Yekaterina Lobaznyuk	Balance beam			9.787		9.787	Silver medal
Yelena Produnova	Qualification	9.368	9.762 Q	9.762 Q	9.637	38.529	5
Yelena Produnova	Uneven bars		9.650			9.650	7
Yelena Produnova	Balance beam			9.775		9.775	Bronze medal
Elena Zamolodchikova	Qualification	9.612 Q	9.687	9.375	9.662 Q	38.336	7 Q
Elena Zamolodchikova	All-around	9.731	9.725	9.700	9.112	38.268	6
Elena Zamolodchikova	Vault	9.731				9.731	Gold medal
Elena Zamolodchikova	Floor				9.850	9.850	Gold medal
Anna Chepeleva; Svetlana Khorkina; Anastasiya Kolesnikova; Yekaterina Lobaznyuk; Yelena Produnova; Elena Zamolodchikova	Qualification	38.454	38.974	38.773	38.673	154.874	1 Q
Anna Chepeleva; Svetlana Khorkina; Anastasiya Kolesnikova; Yekaterina Lobaznyuk; Yelena Produnova; Elena Zamolodchikova	Team	38.605	38.862	37.899	39.037	154.403	Silver medal

==== Rhythmic ====
Athlete	Event	Qualification						Final					
Athlete	Event	Rope	Hoop	Ball	Ribbon	Total	Rank	Rope	Hoop	Ball	Ribbon	Total	Rank
Yulia Barsukova	Individual	9.900	9.900	9.900	9.900	39.600	3 Q	9.883	9.900	9.916	9.933	39.632	Gold medal
Alina Kabaeva	Individual	9.916	9.925	9.925	9.925	39.691	1 Q	9.925	9.641	9.950	9.950	39.466	Bronze medal

Athlete	Event	Qualification				Final			
Athlete	Event	5 Clubs	2 Hoops 3 Ribbons	Total	Rank	5 Clubs	2 Hoops 3 Ribbons	Total	Rank
Irina Belova; Natalia Lavrova; Mariya Netesova; Yelena Shalamova; Vera Shimanskaya; Irina Zilber	Team	19.700	19.666	39.366	2 Q	19.800	19.700	39.500	Gold medal

==== Trampoline ====
Athlete	Event	Heats		Final	
Athlete	Event	Score	Rank	Score	Rank
Alexander Moskalenko	Men's individual	69.00	1 Q	41.70	Gold medal
Irina Karavayeva	Women's individual	65.20	2 Q	38.90	Gold medal

=== Handball ===
Men's team

Russia National Handball Team roster
Players
Coaches

Pos.	#	Name	Age	Ht.	Weight	Club
G	1	Lavrov, Andrey	38 – 26 March 1962	6 ft 6 in (1.98 m)	207 lb (94 kg)
	2	Lavrov, Igor	27 – 4 June 1973	6 ft 0 in (1.83 m)	176 lb (80 kg)
	3	Kulinchenko, Stanislav	29 – 19 April 1971	6 ft 3 in (1.91 m)	190 lb (86 kg)
LW	4	Koksharov, Eduard	24 – 4 November 1975	6 ft 1 in (1.85 m)	192 lb (87 kg)
RW	6	Krivoshlykov, Denis	29 – 10 May 1971	5 ft 11 in (1.8 m)	187 lb (85 kg)
	7	Voronin, Lev	29 – 8 June 1971	6 ft 1 in (1.85 m)	183 lb (83 kg)
RB	8	Tuchkin, Aleksandr	36 – 15 July 1964	6 ft 8 in (2.03 m)	220 lb (100 kg)
LW	9	Kudinov, Vasily	31 – 17 February 1969	6 ft 5 in (1.96 m)	220 lb (100 kg)
P	11	Torgovanov, Dmitri	28 – 5 January 1972	6 ft 7 in (2.01 m)	231 lb (105 kg)
	12	Sukosyan, Pavel	38 – 4 January 1962	6 ft 7 in (2.01 m)	243 lb (110 kg)
	15	Kuzelev, Dmitry	30 – 1 November 1969	6 ft 5 in (1.96 m)	216 lb (98 kg)
	17	Khodkov, Oleg	26 – 5 April 1974	6 ft 5 in (1.96 m)	198 lb (90 kg)
RB	18	Gorpishin, Vyacheslav	30 – 20 January 1970	6 ft 7 in (2.01 m)	220 lb (100 kg)
RB	19	Pogorelov, Sergey	26 – 2 June 1974	6 ft 6 in (1.98 m)	243 lb (110 kg)
	20	Filippov, Dmitry	31 – 19 May 1969	6 ft 2 in (1.88 m)	181 lb (82 kg)

Head coach

- (Russia) Vladimir Maksimov

Legend

- nat field describes country
  of last club
  before the tournament
- Age field is age on 16 September 2000
- Position

-G: Goalkeeper
-P: Pivot
-CB: Centre Back
-LW: Left Wing
-RW: Right Wing
-LB: Left Back
-RB: Right Back

(1)

Preliminary round

Team	Pld	W	D	L	GF	GA	GD	Points
Russia	5	4	0	1	129	121	8	8
Germany	5	3	1	1	128	113	15	7
Yugoslavia	5	3	0	2	130	127	2	6
Egypt	5	3	0	2	122	115	7	6
South Korea	5	1	1	3	128	131	-3	3
Cuba	5	0	0	5	128	158	-30	0

16 September; 19:30	Russia	22–21	Egypt	Referees: Kohout (CZE), Dolejs (CZE)
16 September; 19:30	Koksharov 7		A Awaad 8	Referees: Kohout (CZE), Dolejs (CZE)

18 September; 19:30	Cuba	26–31	Russia	Referees: M Nachevski (MKD), D Nachevski (MKD)
18 September; 19:30	Urios 6		Filippov 12	Referees: M Nachevski (MKD), D Nachevski (MKD)

20 September; 11:30	Russia	26–24	South Korea	Referees: Garsia (FRA), Moreno (FRA)
20 September; 11:30	Voronin 7		Paek 12	Referees: Garsia (FRA), Moreno (FRA)

22 September; 19:30	Germany	25–23	Russia	Referees: Gallego Santos (ESP), Lamas Perez (ESP)
22 September; 19:30	Roos 6		Filippov 7	Referees: Gallego Santos (ESP), Lamas Perez (ESP)

24 September; 21:30	Russia	27–25	Yugoslavia	Referees: Garsia (FRA), Moreno (FRA)
24 September; 21:30	Koksharov, Voronin 8		Butulija, Skrbic 6	Referees: Garsia (FRA), Moreno (FRA)

Quarterfinals

26 September; 14:30	Russia	33–22	Slovenia	Referees: Gallego Santos (ESP), Lamas Perez (ESP)
26 September; 14:30	Koksharov 7		Serbec 6	Referees: Gallego Santos (ESP), Lamas Perez (ESP)

Semifinals

29 September; 14:30	Russia	29–26	Yugoslavia	Referees: Kohout (CZE), Dolejs (CZE)
29 September; 14:30	Koksharov 9		Djukanovic 6	Referees: Kohout (CZE), Dolejs (CZE)

Final

30 September; 21:30	Russia	28–26	Sweden	Referees: Oie (NOR), Hogsnes (NOR)
30 September; 21:30	Tuchkin 7		Vranjes 8	Referees: Oie (NOR), Hogsnes (NOR)

Gold

=== Judo ===
Men

Athlete	Event	Preliminary	Round of 32	Round of 16	Quarterfinals	Semifinals	Final	First Repechage Round	Repechage Quarterfinals	Repechage Semifinals	Bronze Medal Finals	Rank
Athlete	Event	Opposition Result	Opposition Result	Opposition Result	Opposition Result	Opposition Result	Opposition Result	Opposition Result	Opposition Result	Opposition Result	Opposition Result	Rank
Evgeny Stanev	−60 kg		Poulot (CUB); L	Did not advance				Smagulov (KGZ); L	Did not advance			
Islam Matsiev	−66 kg		Rios (ARG); W	Baglayev (KAZ); L	Did not advance							
Vitaliy Makarov	−73 kg		Shakharov (KAZ); L	Did not advance								
Dmitri Morozov	−90 kg		Gugava (GEO); W	Croitoru (ROU); L	Did not advance							
Yury Styopkin	−100 kg		Traineau (FRA); L	Did not advance				Belgroun (ALG); W	Hand (USA); W	Jikurauli (GEO); W	Guido (ITA); W	Bronze medal
Tamerlan Tmenov	+100 kg		van der Geest (NED); W	Möller (GER); W	Pan (CHN); W	Shinohara (JPN); L	Did not advance				Tataroğlu (TUR); W	Bronze medal

Women

Athlete	Event	Preliminary	Round of 32	Round of 16	Quarterfinals	Semifinals	Final	First Repechage Round	Repechage Quarterfinals	Repechage Semifinals	Bronze Medal Finals	Rank
Athlete	Event	Opposition Result	Opposition Result	Opposition Result	Opposition Result	Opposition Result	Opposition Result	Opposition Result	Opposition Result	Opposition Result	Opposition Result	Rank
Lyubov Bruletova	−48 kg			Dunn (GBR); W	Savon (CUB); W	Gradante (GER); W	Tamura (JPN); L					Silver medal
Anna Saraeva	−63 kg			Gal (ITA); L	Did not advance				Ishii (BRA); L	Did not advance		
Yulia Kuzina	−70 kg			Blavo (CIV); W	Cho (KOR); L	Did not advance			Scapin (ITA); L	Did not advance		
Irina Rodina	+78 kg		Kusherbayeva (KAZ); W	Yamashita (JPN); L	Did not advance				Rosensteel (USA); W	Kim (KOR); L	Did not advance	7

=== Modern pentathlon ===
Men

Athlete	Event	Shoot	Fence	Swim	Ride	Run	Total Points	Rank
Dmitri Svatkovskiy	Men's	1048	880	1224	1070	1154	5376	Gold medal
Tatiana Mouratova	Women's	1060	800	1122	1040	914	4936	13
Yelizaveta Suvorova	Women's	1096	960	1117	827	1076	5076	7

=== Rowing ===
Men

Athlete(s)	Event	Heats		Repechage		Semifinals		Final	
Athlete(s)	Event	Time	Rank	Time	Rank	Time	Rank	Time	Rank
Andrey Glukhov; Dmitri Kovalev; Aleksandr Litvinchev; Aleksandr Lukyanov; Sergey Matveyev; Pavel Melnikov; Dmitry Rozinkevich; Anton Chermashentsev; Vladimir Volodenkov; Nikolay Aksyonov	Eight	5:40.55	4 R	5:43.48	3 FB			5:42.72	Final B 3
Sergei Dimitriatchev; Dimitri Ovetchko	Lightweight double sculls	6:46.34	4 R	6:44.54	4 FC			Final C Did Not Start	
Sergei Bukreev; Dmitry Kartashov; Andrey Shevel; Aleksandr Zyuzin	Lightweight coxless four	6:17.01	4 R	6:10.35	2 SF	6:07.99	6 FB	6:09.12	Final B 4

Women

Athlete(s)	Event	Heats		Repechage		Semifinals		Final	
Athlete(s)	Event	Time	Rank	Time	Rank	Time	Rank	Time	Rank
Yulia Alexandrova	Single sculls	7:36.80	2 R	7:47.04	1 SF	7:42.23	3 FA	7:36.57	4
Albina Ligatcheva; Vera Pochitaeva	Coxless pair	7:22.69	4 R	7:20.51	3 FB			7:17.87	Final B 1
Oksana Dorodnova; Irina Fedotova; Yuliya Levina; Larisa Merk	Quadruple sculls	6:31.77	1 FA					6:21.65	Bronze medal

=== Sailing ===
Russia competed in seven Sailing events at the 2000 Sydney Olympics, but they never scored higher than 6-th.

Men

Athlete	Event	Race											Score	Rank
Athlete	Event	1	2	3	4	5	6	7	8	9	10	11	Score	Rank
Vladimir Moiseyev	Mistral	29	31	17	30	(34)	(32)	30	30	29	27	28	251	33
Yevgeni Chernov	Finn	(26)	15	(24)	22	20	21	19	21	10	23	21	172	23
Dmitri Berezkin; Mikhail Krutikov	470	9	17	1	2	14	(26)	11	11	7	10	(29)	82	11

Women

Athlete	Event	Race											Score	Rank
Athlete	Event	1	2	3	4	5	6	7	8	9	10	11	Score	Rank
Anna Basalkna; Vladislava Ukraintseva	470	12	(15)	13	4	14	13	(16)	12	6	14	14	102	15

Open

Athlete	Event	Race											Score	Rank
Athlete	Event	1	2	3	4	5	6	7	8	9	10	11	Score	Rank
Vladimir Krutskikh	Laser	15	9	15	17	(31)	12	19	24	(29)	14	18	143	20
Konstantin Yemelyanov; Aleksandr Yanin	Tornado	12	(17)	14	(16)	14	14	8	13	16	13	14	118	15
Georgy Shayduko; Oleg Khoperskiy; Andrei Kirilyuk	Soling													6

=== Shooting ===
Men

Athlete	Event	Qualification		Final	
Athlete	Event	Score	Rank	Score	Rank
Yevgeni Aleinikov	10 m air rifle	592	6 Q	693.8	Bronze medal
Yevgeni Aleinikov	50 m rifle three positions	1166	7 Q	1265.5	7
Sergei Alifirenko	25 m rapid fire pistol	587	2 Q	687.6	Gold medal
Aleksei Alipov	Double trap	131	14	did not advance	
Aleksei Alipov	Trap	114	9	did not advance	
Vladimir Gontcharov	10 m air pistol	579	9	did not advance	
Vladimir Gontcharov	50 m pistol	564	5 Q	662.2	4
Artem Khadjibekov	10 m air rifle	592	5 Q	695.1	Silver medal
Artem Khadjibekov	50 m rifle prone	597	6 Q	699.2	6
Artem Khadjibekov	50 m rifle three positions	1173	3 Q	1268.2	4
Boris Kokorev	10 m air pistol	572	26	did not advance	
Boris Kokorev	50 m pistol	559	12	did not advance	
Igor Kolessov	10 m running target	576	4 Q	667.5	7
Sergei Kovalenko	50 m rifle prone	594	13	did not advance	
Sergei Lioubomirov	Trap	106	32	did not advance	
Dimitri Lykin	10 m running target	573 (+96)	8 Q	671.7	5
Mikhail Nestruyev	10 m air pistol	583	3 Q	682.3	4
Nikolai Teplyi	Skeet	119	23	did not advance	

Women

Athlete	Event	Qualification		Final	
Athlete	Event	Score	Rank	Score	Rank
Erdzhanik Avetisyan	Skeet	70	4 Q	92 (+5)	6
Svetlana Demina	Skeet	70	6 Q	95	Silver medal
Maria Feklistova	50 m rifle three positions	582	6 Q	679.9	Bronze medal
Lioubov Galkina	10 m air rifle	392	2 Q	496.7	4
Tatiana Goldobina	10 m air rifle	389	32	did not advance	
Tatiana Goldobina	50 m rifle three positions	585	2 Q	680.9	Silver medal
Olga Kuznetsova	10 m air pistol	386	4 Q	482.4	7
Olga Kuznetsova	25 m pistol	578	15	did not advance	
Marina Logvinenko	25 m pistol	580	9	did not advance	
Svetlana Smirnova	10 m air pistol	384	6 Q	483.7	4
Yelena Tkach	Double trap	90	16	did not advance	
Yelena Tkach	Trap	65	6 Q	81	6

=== Swimming ===
Men

Athlete	Events	Heat		Semifinal		Final	
Athlete	Events	Time	Rank	Time	Rank	Time	Rank
Aleksei Filipets	400 m freestyle	3:52.21	14			did not advance	
Aleksei Filipets	1500 m freestyle	15:10.94	5 Q			14:56.88	4
Andrey Kapralov	200 m freestyle	1:49.92	13 Q	1:49.04	10	did not advance	
Dmitri Komornikov	100 m breaststroke	1:01.87	7 Q	1:01.88	10	did not advance	
Dmitri Komornikov	200 m breaststroke	2:15.70	16 Q	2:13.95	9	did not advance	
Aleksei Kovrigin	1500 m freestyle	15:30.69	22			did not advance	
Aleksei Kovrigin	400 m individual medley	4:22.21	17			did not advance	
Igor Marchenko	100 m butterfly	53.98	19	did not advance			
Sergey Ostapchuk	100 m backstroke	56.26	18	did not advance			
Sergey Ostapchuk	200 m backstroke	2:00.17	8 Q	2:00.47	12	did not advance	
Denis Pankratov	200 m butterfly	1:58.01	9 Q	1:57.24	8 Q	1:57.97	7
Denis Pimankov	50 m freestyle	22.74	15 Q	22.89	16	did not advance	
Denis Pimankov	100 m freestyle	49.45	6 Q	49.43	7 Q	49.36	7
Anatoly Polyakov	100 m butterfly	53.30	7 Q	53.32	8 Q	53.13	7
Anatoly Polyakov	200 m butterfly	1:57.67	5 Q	1:56.78	2 Q	1:56.34	4
Alexander Popov	50 m freestyle	22.15	3 Q	22.17	4 Q	22.24	6
Alexander Popov	100 m freestyle	49.29	4 Q	48.84	3 Q	48.69	Silver medal
Roman Sloudnov	100 m breaststroke	1:02.15	10 Q	1:01.15	2 Q	1:00.91	Bronze medal
Roman Sloudnov	200 m breaststroke	2:16.26	20	did not advance			
Dmitri Chernyshov; Andrey Kapralov; Leonid Khokhlov; Denis Pimankov; Alexander Popov	4 × 100 m freestyle	3:19.70	6 Q			DSQ	
Dmitri Chernyshov; Aleksei Filipets; Andrey Kapralov; Sergei Lavrenov; Aleksey Yegorov	4 × 200 m freestyle	7:23.58	8 Q			7:24.37	8
Vladislav Aminov; Dmitri Komornikov; Igor Marchenko; Denis Pimankov	4 × 100 m medley	3:40.83	9			did not advance	

Women

Athlete	Events	Heat		Semifinal		Final	
Athlete	Events	Time	Rank	Time	Rank	Time	Rank
Olga Bakaldina	100 m breaststroke	1:10.53	17	did not advance			
Olga Bakaldina	200 m breaststroke	2:28.19	10 Q	2:25.41	3 Q	2:25.47	5
Nadezhda Chemezova	200 m freestyle	2:00.47	9 Q	1:59.69	4 Q	1:58.86	4
Nadezhda Chemezova	400 m freestyle	4:10.76	6 Q			4:10.37	5
Yekaterina Kibalo	50 m freestyle	26.37	33	did not advance			
Yekaterina Kibalo	100 m freestyle	56.97	20	did not advance			
Irina Raevskaya	100 m backstroke	1:04.76	29	did not advance			
Irina Raevskaya	200 m backstroke	2:16.13	19	did not advance			
Natalya Sutyagina	100 m butterfly	59.50	10 Q	59.30	11	did not advance	
Irina Ufimtseva	400 m freestyle	4:15.41	17			did not advance	
Irina Ufimtseva	800 m freestyle	8:44.64	17			did not advance	
Oxana Verevka	200 m individual medley	2:13.48	1 Q	2:14.04	5 Q	2:13.88	6
Oxana Verevka	400 m individual medley	4:45.07	10			did not advance	
Yekaterina Vinogradova	100 m butterfly	1:01.54	31	did not advance			
Yekaterina Vinogradova	200 m butterfly	2:11.94	18	did not advance			
Marina Chepurkova; Yekaterina Kibalo; Inna Yaitskaya; Lyubov Yudina	4 × 100 m freestyle	3:46.79	10			did not advance	
Nadezhda Chemezova; Yuliya Fomenko; Irina Ufimtseva; Lyubov Yudina	4 × 200 m freestyle	8:08.03	10			did not advance	
Olga Bakaldina; Natalya Sutyagina; Oxana Verevka; Inna Yaitskaya	4 × 100 m medley	4:09.64	9			did not advance	

=== Synchronized swimming ===
Athlete	Event	Technical Routine		Free Routine (Preliminary)		Free Routine (Final)			
Athlete	Event	Points	Rank	Points	Rank	Points	Rank	Total Points	Rank
Olga Brusnikina; Mariya Kiselyova	Duet	34.580	1	64.480	1 Q	65.000	1	99.580	Gold medal
Yelena Antonova; Yelena Azarova; Olga Brusnikina; Mariya Kiselyova; Olga Novokshchenova; Irina Pershina; Yelena Soya; Yuliya Vasilyeva; Olga Vasyukova	Team	34.580	1			64.566	1	99.146	Gold medal

=== Table tennis ===
Women

Athlete	Event	Group	Round 1	Round 2	Quarterfinals	Semifinals	Final
Athlete	Event	Opposition Result	Opposition Result	Opposition Result	Opposition Result	Opposition Result	Opposition Result
Oksana Kushch	Singles	Badescu (ROU); L 1–3; Silva (BRA); W 3–1	did not advance				
Galina Melnik	Singles	Wong (HKG); W 3–2; Abdel Aziz (EGY); W 3–0	Li (CHN) (2); L 2–3	did not advance			
Irina Palina	Singles	Musoke (UGA); W 3–0; Song (HKG); W 3–0	Tóth (HUN) (15); L 0–3	did not advance			
Oksana Kushch; Galina Melnik	Doubles	Badescu (ROU); Steff (ROU); L 0–2; Okenla (NGR); Owon (NGR); W 2–0		did not advance			

=== Taekwondo ===
Men

Athlete	Event	Round of 16	Quarterfinals	Semifinals	Repechage Quarterfinals	Repechage Semifinals	Final	
Athlete	Event	Opposition Result	Opposition Result	Opposition Result	Opposition Result	Opposition Result	Opposition Result	Rank
Aslander Dzitiev	−68 kg	Naeeli (LBA); W 12–3	Sin (KOR); L 1–9	Did not advance	Caliskan (AUT); L 0–6	Did not advance		

Women

Athlete	Event	Round of 16	Quarterfinals	Semifinals	Repechage Quarterfinals	Repechage Semifinals	Final	
Athlete	Event	Opposition Result	Opposition Result	Opposition Result	Opposition Result	Opposition Result	Opposition Result	Rank
Natalia Ivanova	+67 kg		Bosshart (CAN); W 8–6	Vezmar (CRO); W 6–4			Chen (CHN); L 3–8	Silver medal

=== Tennis ===
Men

Athlete	Event	Round of 64	Round of 32	Round of 16	Quarterfinals	Semifinals	Final	Rank
Athlete	Event	Opposition Score	Opposition Score	Opposition Score	Opposition Score	Opposition Score	Opposition Score	Rank
Yevgeny Kafelnikov (5)	Singles	Marín (CRC); W 6–0, 6–1	Chela (ARG); W 7–6(4), 6–4	Philippoussis (AUS) (11); W 7–6(4), 6–3	Kuerten (BRA) (2); W 6–4, 7–5	di Pasquale (FRA); W 6–4, 6–4	Haas (GER); W 7–6(4), 3–6, 6–2, 4–6, 6–3	Gold medal
Marat Safin (1)	Singles	Santoro (FRA); L 6–1, 1–6, 4–6	Did not advance					

Women

Athlete	Event	Round of 64	Round of 32	Round of 16	Quarterfinals	Semifinals	Final	Rank
Athlete	Event	Opposition Score	Opposition Score	Opposition Score	Opposition Score	Opposition Score	Opposition Score	Rank
Elena Dementieva (10)	Singles	Vavrinec (SUI); W 6–1, 6–1	Boogert (NED); W 6–2, 4–6, 7–5	Habšudová (SVK); W 6–2, 6–1	Schett (AUT) (12); W 2–6, 6–2, 6–1	Dokić (AUS); W 2–6, 6–4, 6–4	V Williams (USA) (2); L 2–6, 4–6	Silver medal
Elena Likhovtseva (15)	Singles	Kandarr (GER); L 4–6, 4–6	Did not advance					
Anastasia Myskina	Singles	Daniilidou (GRE); W 6–1, 7–5	Van Roost (BEL) (8); L 2–6, 3–6	Did not advance				
Elena Likhovtseva; Anastasia Myskina	Doubles		Križan (SLO); Srebotnik (SLO) (7); W 7–6(4), 6–3	S Williams (USA); V Williams (USA); L 6–4, 2–6, 3–6	Did not advance			

=== Triathlon ===
Women

Athlete	Event	Swim	Cycling	Run	Total	Rank
Nina Anisimova	Individual	19:17.28	1:05:14.90	37:56.77	2:03:26.35 (+2:45.83)	12

=== Volleyball ===
==== Beach ====
Men

Team	Event	Preliminary Round	Preliminary Elimination	Round of 16	Quarterfinals	Semifinals	Final	Rank
Team	Event	Opposition Score	Opposition Score	Opposition Score	Opposition Score	Opposition Score	Opposition Score	Rank
Sergei Yermishin; Mikhail Kushnerev	Doubles	Baracetti - Salema Abrantes (ARG); W 1-0 (15:4)		Child-Heese (CAN); L 0-1 (6:15)	did not advance			9

==== Indoor ====
Men's team

#	Name	Club	Date of Birth
	Igor Shulepov		16 November 1972 (age 27)
	Valeri Goryushev		26 April 1974 (age 26)
	Aleksandr Gerasimov		22 November 1975 (age 24)
	Roman Yakovlev		13 August 1976 (age 24)
	Aleksey Kazakov		18 March 1976 (age 24)
	Vadim Khamuttskikh		26 November 1969 (age 30)
	Aleksey Kuleshov		24 February 1979 (age 21)
	Evgeni Mitkov		23 March 1972 (age 28)
	Ruslan Olikhver		11 April 1969 (age 31)
	Ilya Savelev		10 June 1971 (age 29)
	Sergey Tetyukhin		23 September 1975 (age 24)
	Konstantin Ushakov		24 March 1970 (age 30)

Head coach: Gennadiy Shipulin

Preliminary round

Pos	Team	Pld	W	L	Pts	SW	SL	SR	SPW	SPL	SPR	Qualification
1	Italy	5	5	0	10	15	4	3.750	482	421	1.145	Quarterfinals
2	Russia	5	4	1	9	13	7	1.857	465	443	1.050	Quarterfinals
3	FR Yugoslavia	5	3	2	8	12	9	1.333	489	461	1.061	Quarterfinals
4	Argentina	5	2	3	7	7	11	0.636	409	446	0.917	Quarterfinals
5	South Korea	5	1	4	6	8	14	0.571	491	504	0.974	
6	United States	5	0	5	5	5	15	0.333	417	478	0.872	

17 September 2000; 12:30	Russia	3–1	FR Yugoslavia	Sydney Entertainment Centre; Attendance: 8,056; Referees: Takashi Shimoyama (Japan)
17 September 2000; 12:30	(19–25, 25–23, 25–23, 25–20)			Sydney Entertainment Centre; Attendance: 8,056; Referees: Takashi Shimoyama (Japan)

19 September 2000; 14:30	Russia	3–1	United States	Sydney Entertainment Centre; Attendance: 7,223; Referees: Dean Turner (Australia)
19 September 2000; 14:30	(25–18, 25–23, 21–25, 25–17)			Sydney Entertainment Centre; Attendance: 7,223; Referees: Dean Turner (Australia)

21 September 2000; 14:30	South Korea	2–3	Russia	Sydney Entertainment Centre; Attendance: 8,085; Referees: Jose Ramon Perez Vento (Cuba)
21 September 2000; 14:30	(22–25, 25–22, 25–20, 27–29, 15–17)			Sydney Entertainment Centre; Attendance: 8,085; Referees: Jose Ramon Perez Vento (Cuba)

23 September 2000; 14:30	Russia	1–3	Italy	Sydney Entertainment Centre; Attendance: 8,278; Referees: Josebel Palmeirim (Brazil)
23 September 2000; 14:30	(20–25, 20–25, 25–22, 22–25)			Sydney Entertainment Centre; Attendance: 8,278; Referees: Josebel Palmeirim (Brazil)

25 September 2000; 10:00	Argentina	0–3	Russia	Sydney Entertainment Centre; Attendance: 4,676; Referees: Songsak Chareonpong (Thailand)
25 September 2000; 10:00	(23–25, 15–25, 20–25)			Sydney Entertainment Centre; Attendance: 4,676; Referees: Songsak Chareonpong (Thailand)

Quarterfinals

27 September 2000; 12:30	Cuba	2–3	Russia	Sydney Entertainment Centre; Attendance: 7,514; Referees: Takashi Shimoyama (Japan)
27 September 2000; 12:30	(25–21, 23–25, 19–25, 25–19, 13–15)			Sydney Entertainment Centre; Attendance: 7,514; Referees: Takashi Shimoyama (Japan)

Semifinals

29 September 2000; 18:30	Argentina	1–3	Russia	Sydney Entertainment Centre; Attendance: 8,177; Referees: Jose Ramon Perez Vento (Cuba)
29 September 2000; 18:30	(25–27, 30–32, 25–21, 11–25)			Sydney Entertainment Centre; Attendance: 8,177; Referees: Jose Ramon Perez Vento (Cuba)

Final

1 October 2000; 14:30	Russia	0–3	FR Yugoslavia	Sydney Entertainment Centre; Attendance: 9,444; Referees: Juan Angel Pereyra (Argentina)
1 October 2000; 14:30	(22–25, 22–25, 20–25)			Sydney Entertainment Centre; Attendance: 9,444; Referees: Juan Angel Pereyra (Argentina)

Silver

Women's team

#	Name	Club	Date of Birth
	Yevgeniya Artamonova		17 July 1975 (age 25)
	Anastasiya Belikova		22 July 1979 (age 21)
	Lioubov Chachkova		4 December 1977 (age 22)
	Yekaterina Gamova		17 October 1980 (age 19)
	Yelena Godina		17 September 1977 (age 22)
	Tatyana Gracheva		23 February 1973 (age 27)
	Natalya Morozova		28 January 1973 (age 27)
	Olga Potachova		26 June 1976 (age 24)
	Inessa Sargsyan		17 January 1972 (age 28)
	Elizaveta Tishchenko		7 February 1975 (age 25)
	Elena Tyurina		12 April 1971 (age 29)
	Yelena Vasilevskaya		27 February 1978 (age 22)

Head coach: Nikolay Karpol

Preliminary round

Pos	Team	Pld	W	L	Pts	SW	SL	SR	SPW	SPL	SPR	Qualification
1	Russia	5	5	0	10	15	5	3.000	465	392	1.186	Quarterfinals
2	Cuba	5	4	1	9	14	4	3.500	419	332	1.262	Quarterfinals
3	South Korea	5	3	2	8	9	9	1.000	393	413	0.952	Quarterfinals
4	Germany	5	2	3	7	8	10	0.800	380	395	0.962	Quarterfinals
5	Italy	5	1	4	6	7	12	0.583	427	446	0.957	
6	Peru	5	0	5	5	2	15	0.133	316	422	0.749	

16 September 2000; 12:00	Peru	0–3	Russia	Sydney Entertainment Centre; Attendance: 4,637; Referees: Doug Wayne Wilson (United States)
16 September 2000; 12:00	(17–25, 13–25, 20–25)			Sydney Entertainment Centre; Attendance: 4,637; Referees: Doug Wayne Wilson (United States)

18 September 2000; 20:30	Cuba	2–3	Russia	Sydney Entertainment Centre; Attendance: 6,694; Referees: Juan Angel Pereyra (Argentina)
18 September 2000; 20:30	(25–20, 21–25, 25–21, 12–25, 13–15)			Sydney Entertainment Centre; Attendance: 6,694; Referees: Juan Angel Pereyra (Argentina)

20 September 2000; 12:00	Russia	3–1	Italy	Sydney Entertainment Centre; Attendance: 3,385; Referees: Stoyan Kostov Stoyanov (Bulgaria)
20 September 2000; 12:00	(29–31, 25–18, 25–21, 25–19)			Sydney Entertainment Centre; Attendance: 3,385; Referees: Stoyan Kostov Stoyanov (Bulgaria)

22 September 2000; 14:35	Germany	2–3	Russia	Sydney Entertainment Centre; Attendance: 6,706; Referees: Takashi Shimoyama (Japan)
22 September 2000; 14:35	(23–25, 25–23, 25–14, 26–28, 6–15)			Sydney Entertainment Centre; Attendance: 6,706; Referees: Takashi Shimoyama (Japan)

24 September 2000; 20:30	Russia	3–0	South Korea	Sydney Entertainment Centre; Attendance: 8,226; Referees: Juan Angel Pereyra (Argentina)
24 September 2000; 20:30	(25–15, 25–21, 25–16)			Sydney Entertainment Centre; Attendance: 8,226; Referees: Juan Angel Pereyra (Argentina)

Quarterfinals

26 September 2000; 14:30	China	0–3	Russia	Sydney Entertainment Centre; Attendance: 6,358; Referees: Josebel Palmeirim (Brazil)
26 September 2000; 14:30	(25–27, 23–25, 25–27)			Sydney Entertainment Centre; Attendance: 6,358; Referees: Josebel Palmeirim (Brazil)

Semifinals

28 September 2000; 20:55	United States	2–3	Russia	Sydney Entertainment Centre; Attendance: 9,031; Referees: Juan Angel Pereyra (Argentina)
28 September 2000; 20:55	(15–25, 25–23, 15–25, 28–26, 8–15)			Sydney Entertainment Centre; Attendance: 9,031; Referees: Juan Angel Pereyra (Argentina)

Final

30 September 2000; 14:30	Cuba	3–2	Russia	Sydney Entertainment Centre; Attendance: 9,444; Referees: Josebel Palmeirim (Brazil)
30 September 2000; 14:30	(25–27, 32–34, 25–19, 25–18, 15–7)			Sydney Entertainment Centre; Attendance: 9,444; Referees: Josebel Palmeirim (Brazil)

Silver

=== Water polo ===
Men's team

Roman Balashov, Dmitri Douguine, Alexander Yerishev, Serguei Garbouzov, Dmitry Gorshkov, Yuri Yatsev, Nikolay Kozlov, Nikolai Maximov, Andrei Reketchinski, Dmitri Stratan, Revaz Tchomakhidze, Marat Zakirov, Irek Zinnourov

Preliminary round

Pos	Team	Pld	W	D	L	GF	GA	GD	Pts	Qualification
1	Russia	5	4	1	0	51	28	+23	9	Quarter Finals
2	Italy	5	4	1	0	43	32	+11	9	Quarter Finals
3	Spain	5	2	1	2	32	34	−2	5	Quarter Finals
4	Australia (H)	5	1	2	2	38	36	+2	4	Quarter Finals
5	Kazakhstan	5	1	1	3	41	46	−5	3	
6	Slovakia	5	0	0	5	30	59	−29	0	

Source: LA84
Rules for classification: 1) Points; 2) Head-to-head points; 3) Head-to-head goal difference; 4) Head-to-head goals scored; 5) Goal difference.
(H) Hosts

23 September 2000; 17:30	Australia	4–6	Russia	Ryde Aquatic Leisure Centre; Referees: Bookelman (NED), Rajevic (YUG)
23 September 2000; 17:30	Score by quarters: 1-2, 0-1, 1-2, 2-1			Ryde Aquatic Leisure Centre; Referees: Bookelman (NED), Rajevic (YUG)
23 September 2000; 17:30	Kovalenko 2	Goals	six players 1	Ryde Aquatic Leisure Centre; Referees: Bookelman (NED), Rajevic (YUG)

24 September 2000; 10:45	Russia	7–7	Italy	Ryde Aquatic Leisure Centre; Referees: Tulga (TUR), Margeta (SLO)
24 September 2000; 10:45	Score by quarters: 2-1, 3-3, 2-1, 0-2			Ryde Aquatic Leisure Centre; Referees: Tulga (TUR), Margeta (SLO)
24 September 2000; 10:45	Zakirov 2	Goals	Bencivenga, Sottani 3	Ryde Aquatic Leisure Centre; Referees: Tulga (TUR), Margeta (SLO)

25 September 2000; 15:45	Kazakhstan	7–9	Russia	Ryde Aquatic Leisure Centre; Referees: Czaszar (HUN), Moradi Shahpar (IRI)
25 September 2000; 15:45	Score by quarters: 1-1, 1-4, 2-2, 3-2			Ryde Aquatic Leisure Centre; Referees: Czaszar (HUN), Moradi Shahpar (IRI)
25 September 2000; 15:45	Elke 2	Goals	Balashov, Stratan, Gorshkov 2	Ryde Aquatic Leisure Centre; Referees: Czaszar (HUN), Moradi Shahpar (IRI)

26 September 2000; 10:45	Russia	8–5	Spain	Ryde Aquatic Leisure Centre; Referees: Margeta (SLO), Schwartz (GER)
26 September 2000; 10:45	Score by quarters: 4-3, 1-0, 1-1, 2-1			Ryde Aquatic Leisure Centre; Referees: Margeta (SLO), Schwartz (GER)
26 September 2000; 10:45	Tchomakhidze 3	Goals	Moro 2	Ryde Aquatic Leisure Centre; Referees: Margeta (SLO), Schwartz (GER)

27 September 2000; 10:45	Slovakia	5–21	Russia	Ryde Aquatic Leisure Centre; Referees: Klaric (CRO), Janseen van de Laak (NED)
27 September 2000; 10:45	Score by quarters: 1-7, 1-5, 1-6, 2-3			Ryde Aquatic Leisure Centre; Referees: Klaric (CRO), Janseen van de Laak (NED)
27 September 2000; 10:45	Nižný, Veszelits 2	Goals	Tchomakhidze 6	Ryde Aquatic Leisure Centre; Referees: Klaric (CRO), Janseen van de Laak (NED)

Quarterfinals

29 September 2000; 14:30	Russia	11–10	United States	Ryde Aquatic Leisure Centre; Referees: Bookelman (NED), Margeta (SLO)
29 September 2000; 14:30	Score by quarters: 3-0, 2-4, 4-3, 2-3			Ryde Aquatic Leisure Centre; Referees: Bookelman (NED), Margeta (SLO)
29 September 2000; 14:30	Yerishev 4	Goals	Azevedo, Wigo 3	Ryde Aquatic Leisure Centre; Referees: Bookelman (NED), Margeta (SLO)

Semifinals

30 September 2000; 14:30	Russia	8–7; OT (OT)	Spain	Sydney International Aquatic Centre; Referees: Dani (ITA), Kratochvil (SVK)
30 September 2000; 14:30	Score by quarters: 3-3, 2-1, 1-1, 1-2 OT: 1-0			Sydney International Aquatic Centre; Referees: Dani (ITA), Kratochvil (SVK)
30 September 2000; 14:30	Stratan, Gorshkov 2	Goals	Moro 4	Sydney International Aquatic Centre; Referees: Dani (ITA), Kratochvil (SVK)

Final

1 October 2000; 16:15	Russia	6–13	Hungary	Sydney International Aquatic Centre; Referees: Bookelman (NED), Chasekioglou (GRE)
1 October 2000; 16:15	Score by quarters: 1-3, 1-5, 2-2, 2-3			Sydney International Aquatic Centre; Referees: Bookelman (NED), Chasekioglou (GRE)
1 October 2000; 16:15	Yerishev 3	Goals	Benedek 4	Sydney International Aquatic Centre; Referees: Bookelman (NED), Chasekioglou (GRE)

Silver

Women's team

Marina Akobiya, Ekaterina Anikeeva, Sofia Konukh, Maria Koroleva, Natalia Kutuzova, Svetlana Kuzina, Yuliya Petrova, Tatiana Petrova, Galina Rytova, Elena Smurova, Elena Tokun, Irina Tolkunova, Ekaterina Vasilieva

Preliminary round

Pos	Team	Pld	W	D	L	GF	GA	GD	Pts	Qualification
1	Australia (H)	5	4	0	1	35	20	+15	8	Semi Finals
2	United States	5	3	1	1	36	30	+6	7	Semi Finals
3	Netherlands	5	3	0	2	27	26	+1	6	Semi Finals
4	Russia	5	2	1	2	36	29	+7	5	Semi Finals
5	Canada	5	1	2	2	33	34	−1	4	
6	Kazakhstan	5	0	0	5	23	51	−28	0	

Source: LA84
Rules for classification: 1) Points; 2) Head-to-head points; 3) Head-to-head goal difference; 4) Head-to-head goals scored; 5) Goal difference.
(H) Hosts

16 September 2000; 18:00	Report	Canada	7–7	Russia	Ryde Aquatic Centre; Referees: Ahmet Erhan Tulga (TUR), Patrick Clemenson (FRA)
16 September 2000; 18:00	Report	Score by quarters: 2-3, 0-1, 2-2, 3-1			Ryde Aquatic Centre; Referees: Ahmet Erhan Tulga (TUR), Patrick Clemenson (FRA)
16 September 2000; 18:00	Report	Dow 3	Goals	two players 2	Ryde Aquatic Centre; Referees: Ahmet Erhan Tulga (TUR), Patrick Clemenson (FRA)

17 September 2000; 13:00	Report	Australia	6–3	Russia	Ryde Aquatic Centre; Referees: Paraskevas Chasekioglou (GRE), Gad Schwartz (ISR)
17 September 2000; 13:00	Report	Score by quarters: 2-1, 1-1, 2-1, 1-0			Ryde Aquatic Centre; Referees: Paraskevas Chasekioglou (GRE), Gad Schwartz (ISR)
17 September 2000; 13:00	Report	two players 2	Goals	three players 1	Ryde Aquatic Centre; Referees: Paraskevas Chasekioglou (GRE), Gad Schwartz (ISR)

18 September 2000; 18:00	Report	Russia	5–7	United States	Ryde Aquatic Centre; Referees: Renato Dani (ITA), Patrick Clemencon (FRA)
18 September 2000; 18:00	Report	Score by quarters: 1-1, 2-2, 1-3, 1-1			Ryde Aquatic Centre; Referees: Renato Dani (ITA), Patrick Clemencon (FRA)
18 September 2000; 18:00	Report	five players 1	Goals	Simmons 3	Ryde Aquatic Centre; Referees: Renato Dani (ITA), Patrick Clemencon (FRA)

19 September 2000; 18:00	Report	Kazakhstan	6–15	Russia	Ryde Aquatic Centre; Referees: Gad Schwartz (ISR), Vlastimil Kratochvil (SVK)
19 September 2000; 18:00	Report	Score by quarters: 1-5, 1-5, 3-3, 1-2			Ryde Aquatic Centre; Referees: Gad Schwartz (ISR), Vlastimil Kratochvil (SVK)
19 September 2000; 18:00	Report	Aleyeva 2	Goals	two players 3	Ryde Aquatic Centre; Referees: Gad Schwartz (ISR), Vlastimil Kratochvil (SVK)

20 September 2000; 18:00	Report	Russia	6–3	Netherlands	Ryde Aquatic Centre; Referees: Ahmet Erhan Tulga (TUR), Gyorgy Csaszar (HUN)
20 September 2000; 18:00	Report	Score by quarters: 1-2, 1-1, 3-0, 1-0			Ryde Aquatic Centre; Referees: Ahmet Erhan Tulga (TUR), Gyorgy Csaszar (HUN)
20 September 2000; 18:00	Report	Konoukh 3	Goals	Kuipers 2	Ryde Aquatic Centre; Referees: Ahmet Erhan Tulga (TUR), Gyorgy Csaszar (HUN)

Semifinals

22 September 2000; 13:00	Report	Australia	7–6	Russia	Ryde Aquatic Centre; Referees: Rolf Helmut Ludecke (GER), Boris Margeta (SLO)
22 September 2000; 13:00	Report	Score by quarters: 2-3, 1-1, 1-2, 3-0			Ryde Aquatic Centre; Referees: Rolf Helmut Ludecke (GER), Boris Margeta (SLO)
22 September 2000; 13:00	Report	Mayer 3	Goals	Tokoun 2	Ryde Aquatic Centre; Referees: Rolf Helmut Ludecke (GER), Boris Margeta (SLO)

Bronze Medal Match

23 September 2000; 20:00	Report	Russia	4–3	Netherlands	Sydney Olympic Aquatic Centre; Referees: Ahmet Erhan Tulga (TUR), Paraskevas Chasekioglou (GRE)
23 September 2000; 20:00	Report	Score by quarters: 0-2, 1-0, 1-1, 2-0			Sydney Olympic Aquatic Centre; Referees: Ahmet Erhan Tulga (TUR), Paraskevas Chasekioglou (GRE)
23 September 2000; 20:00	Report	Konoukh 2	Goals	Kuipers 2	Sydney Olympic Aquatic Centre; Referees: Ahmet Erhan Tulga (TUR), Paraskevas Chasekioglou (GRE)

=== Weightlifting ===
Men

Athlete	Event	Snatch		Clean & Jerk		Total	Rank
Athlete	Event	Result	Rank	Result	Rank	Total	Rank
Aleksey Bortkov	-62 kg	No Mark		Did Not Finish			
Yury Myshkovets	-85 kg	162.5 kg	12	192.5 kg	15	355.0 kg	13
Aleksei Petrov	-94 kg	180.0 kg	4	222.5 kg	1	402.5 kg	Bronze medal
Evgeny Chigishev	-105 kg	190.0 kg	5	225.0 kg	6	415.0 kg	5
Evgeny Shishlyannikov	-105 kg	187.5 kg	8	No Mark		Did Not Finish	
Andrei Chemerkin	+105 kg	202.5 kg	5	260.0 kg	3	462.5 kg	Bronze medal

Women

Athlete	Event	Snatch		Clean & Jerk		Total	Rank
Athlete	Event	Result	Rank	Result	Rank	Total	Rank
Valentina Popova	-63 kg	107.5 kg	2	127.5 kg	2	235.0 kg	Silver medal
Irina Kasimova	-69 kg	100.0 kg	10	130.0 kg	6	230.0 kg	6
Svetlana Khabirova	-75 kg	102.5 kg	8	125.0 kg	5	227.5 kg	6

=== Wrestling ===
Men's Freestyle

Athlete	Event	Elimination Pool	Quarterfinals	Semifinals	Final	Rank
Athlete	Event	Opposition Result	Opposition Result	Opposition Result	Opposition Result	Rank
Leonid Chuchunov	−54 kg	Zakharuk (UKR); L 0–3; Tsonov (BUL); W 4–0	did not advance			12
Murad Ramazanov	−58 kg	Zakhartdinov (UZB); W 3–1; Cuciuc (MDA); L 0–3; Doğan (TUR); W 4–0		did not advance		8
Murad Umakhanov	−63 kg	Tedeyev (UKR); W 4–1; Jo (PRK); W 3–1		Jang (KOR); W 3–1	Barzakov (BUL); W 3–1	Gold medal
Arsen Gitinov	−69 kg	Gevorgyan (ARM); W 3–1; Hurtado (COL); W 4–0; Loizidis (GRE); W 3–1		Demchenko (BLR); W 3–1	Igali (CAN); L 1–3	Silver medal
Buvaisar Saitiev	−76 kg	Paskalev (BUL); W 3–1; Slay (USA); L 1–3	did not advance			10
Adam Saitiev	−85 kg	Musaev (BLR); W 3–1; Praporshchikov (AUS); W 4–0	Yang (KOR); W 3–0	Ibragimov (MKD); W 3–0	Romero (CUB); W 4–0	Gold medal
Sagid Murtazaliev	−97 kg	Tasoyev (UKR); W 3–0; Douglas (USA); W 3–1	Xanthopoulos (GRE); W 3–0	Kurtanidze (GEO); W 3–1	Bayramukov (KAZ); W 3–0	Gold medal
David Musulbes	−130 kg	Thiele (GER); W 3–0; Pecha (SVK); W 4–0		Jadidi (IRI); W 3–0	Taymazov (UZB); W 3–1	Gold medal

Men's Greco-Roman

Athlete	Event	Elimination Pool	Quarterfinals	Semifinals	Final	Rank
Athlete	Event	Opposition Result	Opposition Result	Opposition Result	Opposition Result	Rank
Aleksey Shevtsov	−54 kg	Kang (PRK); L 1–3; Sandu (ROU); W 3–1	did not advance			12
Valery Nikonorov	−58 kg	Borăscu (ROU); W 3–1; Yıldız (GER); L 1–3; Barguaoui (TUN); W 3–1		did not advance		7
Varteres Samurgashev	−63 kg	Eroğlu (TUR); W 3–1; Zawadzki (POL); W 4–0	Bracken (USA); W 3–1	Chachua (GEO); W 3–1	Marén (CUB); W 3–0	Gold medal
Aleksey Glushkov	−69 kg	Wolny (POL); W 3–1; Kopytov (BLR); W 4–0; Adzhi (UKR); W 3–1		Nagata (JPN); L 1–3	Bronze medal final Nikitin (EST); W 3–0	
Murat Kardanov	−76 kg	Katayama (JPN); W 3–0; Berzicza (HUN); W 3–0	Abrahamian (SWE); W 3–1	Yli-Hannuksela (FIN); W 3–0	Lindland (USA); W 3–0	Gold medal
Aleksandr Menshchikov	−85 kg	Tsilent (BLR); L 0–3; Oliynyk (UKR); W 3–0	did not advance			13
Gogi Koguashvili	−97 kg	Lowney (USA); L 1–3; Švec (CZE); W 3–1	did not advance			12
Aleksandr Karelin	−130 kg	Mureiko (BUL); W 3–0; Deák-Bárdos (HUN); W 4–0	Saldadze (UKR); W 3–0	Debelka (BLR); W 3–0	Gardner (USA); L 0–3	Silver medal

== Notes ==
- Wallechinsky, David (2004). The Complete Book of the Summer Olympics (Athens 2004 Edition). Toronto, Canada. ISBN 1-894963-32-6.
- International Olympic Committee (2001). The Results. Retrieved 12 November 2005.
- Sydney Organising Committee for the Olympic Games (2001). Official Report of the XXVII Olympiad Volume 1: Preparing for the Games. Retrieved 20 November 2005.
- Sydney Organising Committee for the Olympic Games (2001). Official Report of the XXVII Olympiad Volume 2: Celebrating the Games. Retrieved 20 November 2005.
- Sydney Organising Committee for the Olympic Games (2001). The Results. Retrieved 20 November 2005.
- International Olympic Committee Web Site
