= Volleyball at the 2000 Summer Olympics =

Volleyball at the Games of the XXVII Olympiad
- Venue: Sydney Entertainment Centre (indoor); Sydney Showground Pavilion 4 (indoor); Bondi Beach Volleyball Centre (beach)
- Dates: 16 September – 1 October 2000
- No. of events: 4
- Competitors: 375 from 29 nations

At the 2000 Summer Olympics, four volleyball events were contested – men's and women's indoor volleyball, and men's and women's beach volleyball.

== Medal table ==
Rank	Nation	Gold	Silver	Bronze	Total
1	Australia	1	0	0	1
1	Cuba	1	0	0	1
1	FR Yugoslavia	1	0	0	1
1	United States	1	0	0	1
5	Brazil	0	2	2	4
6	Russia	0	2	0	2
7	Germany	0	0	1	1
7	Italy	0	0	1	1
Totals (8 entries)		4	4	4	12

== Medal summary ==
Event	Gold	Silver	Bronze
Men's indoor	FR Yugoslavia; Vladimir Batez; Slobodan Kovač; Slobodan Boškan; Đula Mešter; Vasa Mijić; Nikola Grbić; Vladimir Grbić; Andrija Gerić; Goran Vujević; Ivan Miljković; Veljko Petković; Igor Vušurović	Russia; Vadim Khamuttskikh; Ruslan Olikhver; Valeri Goryushev; Igor Shulepov; Aleksey Kazakov; Evgeni Mitkov; Sergey Tetyukhin; Roman Yakovlev; Konstantin Ushakov; Aleksandr Gerasimov; Ilya Savelev; Aleksey Kuleshov	Italy; Andrea Gardini; Marco Meoni; Pasquale Gravina; Luigi Mastrangelo; Paolo Tofoli; Samuele Papi; Andrea Sartoretti; Marco Bracci; Simone Rosalba; Mirko Corsano; Andrea Giani; Alessandro Fei
Women's indoor	Cuba; Taimaris Aguero; Zoila Barros; Regla Bell; Marlenis Costa; Ana Fernández; Mirka Francia; Idalmis Gato; Lilia Izquierdo; Mireya Luis (c); Yumilka Ruíz; Martha Sánchez; Regla Torres	Russia; Yevgeniya Artamonova; Anastasiya Belikova; Lioubov Kılıç; Yekaterina Gamova; Yelena Godina; Tatyana Gracheva; Natalya Morozova; Olga Potachova; Inessa Korkmaz; Elizaveta Tishchenko; Elena Tyurina (L); Yelena Vasilevskaya	Brazil; Leila Barros; Erika Coimbra; Janina Conceição; Virna Dias; Kely Fraga; Ricarda Lima (L); Kátia Lopes; Elisângela Oliveira; Walewska Oliveira; Karin Rodrigues; Raquel Silva; Hélia Souza
Men's beach	Dain Blanton and Eric Fonoimoana; United States	Zé Marco de Melo and Ricardo Santos; Brazil	Axel Hager and Jörg Ahmann; Germany
Women's beach	Natalie Cook and Kerri Pottharst; Australia	Shelda Bede and Adriana Behar; Brazil	Adriana Samuel and Sandra Pires; Brazil
