= 1999 FIVB Volleyball Men's World Cup =

1999 Men's World Cup
Tournament details
- Host country: Japan
- Dates: 18 November – 2 December
- Teams: 12 (from 5 confederations)
- Venues: 7 (in 6 host cities)

Final positions
- Champions: Russia (1st title)
- Runners-up: Cuba
- Third place: Italy
- Fourth place: United States

Tournament awards
- MVP: (Russia) Roman Yakovlev

The 1999 FIVB Men's World Cup was held from 18 November to 2 December 1999 in Japan. Twelve men's national teams played in cities all over Japan for the right to a fast lane ticket into the 2000 Summer Olympics in Sydney, Australia.

The twelve competing teams played a single-round robin format, in two parallel pools (site A and site B). The teams played in Tokyo, Kagoshima, Hiroshima, Kumamoto, Osaka, Nagoya, Yoyogi, and Komazawa.

== Qualification ==
Means of qualification	Host	Date	Vacancies	Qualified
Host country	—	―	1	Japan
1999 Men's European Volleyball Championship	7–12 September 1999	Austria	2	Italy
1999 Men's European Volleyball Championship	7–12 September 1999	Austria	2	Russia
1999 Men's NORCECA Volleyball Championship	7–12 September 1999	(Mexico) Monterrey	2	United States
1999 Men's NORCECA Volleyball Championship	7–12 September 1999	(Mexico) Monterrey	2	Cuba
1999 Men's South American Volleyball Championship	7–11 September 1999	(Argentina) Córdoba	2	Brazil
1999 Men's South American Volleyball Championship	7–11 September 1999	(Argentina) Córdoba	2	Argentina
1999 Asian Men's Volleyball Championship	2–9 September 1999	(Iran) Tehran	2	China
1999 Asian Men's Volleyball Championship	2–9 September 1999	(Iran) Tehran	2	South Korea
1999 Men's African Volleyball Championship	1–9 August 1999	(Egypt) Cairo	1	Tunisia
Wild Cards	―	―	2	Spain
Wild Cards	―	―	2	Canada
Total			12	

== Results ==
Pos	Team	Pld	W	L	Pts	SW	SL	SR	SPW	SPL	SPR
1	Russia	11	9	2	20	31	11	2.818	1003	859	1.168
2	Cuba	11	8	3	19	26	12	2.167	890	801	1.111
3	Italy	11	8	3	19	26	14	1.857	935	834	1.121
4	United States	11	8	3	19	28	17	1.647	1053	1004	1.049
5	Brazil	11	7	4	18	27	15	1.800	958	850	1.127
6	Spain	11	7	4	18	25	19	1.316	995	974	1.022
7	South Korea	11	6	5	17	18	21	0.857	873	884	0.988
8	Canada	11	5	6	16	17	24	0.708	881	943	0.934
9	Argentina	11	4	7	15	18	23	0.783	910	953	0.955
10	Japan	11	3	8	14	16	27	0.593	903	995	0.908
11	China	11	1	10	12	10	31	0.323	847	977	0.867
12	Tunisia	11	0	11	11	5	33	0.152	758	932	0.813

All times are Japan Standard Time (UTC+09:00).

=== First round ===
==== Site A ====
Venue: Yoyogi National Stadium, Tokyo

Date	Time		Score		Set 1	Set 2	Set 3	Set 4	Set 5	Total
18 Nov	12:30	Cuba	3–0	South Korea	25–23	25–18	25–20			75–61
18 Nov	15:00	Argentina	3–0	Spain	25–21	25–20	29–27			79–68
18 Nov	18:15	Canada	3–2	Japan	19–25	25–23	16–25	25–21	15–8	100–102
19 Nov	12:30	Cuba	3–0	Argentina	25–20	25–20	25–22			75–62
19 Nov	15:00	Spain	3–0	Canada	25–18	25–16	26–24			76–58
19 Nov	18:15	South Korea	3–1	Japan	25–19	25–16	22–25	25–20		97–80
20 Nov	12:30	Canada	3–0	South Korea	25–23	28–26	25–21			78–70
20 Nov	15:00	Cuba	3–1	Spain	24–26	25–21	25–20	25–16		99–83
20 Nov	18:15	Japan	3–1	Argentina	25–23	20–25	25–23	25–16		95–87

==== Site B ====
Venue: Kagoshima Arena, Kagoshima

Date	Time		Score		Set 1	Set 2	Set 3	Set 4	Set 5	Total
18 Nov	13:30	United States	3–2	Brazil	25–22	25–18	22–25	20–25	15–13	107–103
18 Nov	16:00	Italy	3–0	Tunisia	25–21	25–21	25–16			75–58
18 Nov	18:35	Russia	3–0	China	25–14	27–25	25–16			77–55
19 Nov	13:30	Russia	3–1	Italy	25–21	29–27	23–25	25–18		102–91
19 Nov	16:00	Brazil	3–0	China	25–19	25–18	25–15			75–52
19 Nov	18:35	United States	3–1	Tunisia	23–25	25–21	25–15	25–23		98–84
20 Nov	13:30	Italy	3–0	Brazil	25–16	25–19	25–17			75–52
20 Nov	16:00	Russia	3–0	Tunisia	25–18	25–15	25–21			75–54
20 Nov	18:35	United States	3–1	China	23–25	25–21	25–22	25–18		98–86

=== Second round ===
==== Site A ====
Location: Hiroshima

Date	Time		Score		Set 1	Set 2	Set 3	Set 4	Set 5	Total
22 Nov	12:30	Cuba	3–0	Canada	25–17	25–17	26–24			76–58
22 Nov	15:00	South Korea	3–2	Argentina	25–22	25–19	23–25	17–25	20–18	110–109
22 Nov	18:15	Spain	3–2	Japan	25–13	29–31	17–25	25–16	15–13	111–98
23 Nov	12:30	Argentina	3–1	Canada	25–22	20–25	25–19	25–22		95–88
23 Nov	15:00	Spain	3–0	South Korea	26–24	25–22	25–23			76–69
23 Nov	18:15	Cuba	3–0	Japan	25–21	25–22	25–16			75–59

==== Site B ====
Venue: Kumamoto Prefectural Gymnasium, Kumamoto

Date	Time		Score		Set 1	Set 2	Set 3	Set 4	Set 5	Total
22 Nov	12:30	Russia	3–2	Brazil	25–20	21–25	19–25	25–22	15–12	105–104
22 Nov	15:00	United States	3–0	Italy	25–23	25–19	25–22			75–64
22 Nov	18:15	China	3–1	Tunisia	25–23	21–25	25–23	25–18		96–89
23 Nov	13:30	Brazil	3–0	Tunisia	25–20	25–20	25–17			75–57
23 Nov	16:00	Russia	3–2	United States	25–22	25–19	20–25	30–32	15–11	115–109
23 Nov	18:35	Italy	3–1	China	23–25	25–16	25–14	25–21		98–76

=== Third round ===
==== Site A ====
Venue: Osaka Municipal Central Gymnasium, Osaka

Date	Time		Score		Set 1	Set 2	Set 3	Set 4	Set 5	Total
26 Nov	12:30	Cuba	3–0	China	25–18	25–16	25–17			75–51
26 Nov	15:00	Spain	3–0	Tunisia	25–16	25–16	25–18			75–50
26 Nov	18:15	United States	3–1	Japan	22–25	25–23	25–23	25–23		97–94
27 Nov	12:30	Cuba	3–1	Tunisia	25–18	22–25	25–23	26–24		97–90
27 Nov	15:00	Spain	3–1	United States	25–22	21–25	25–21	25–21		96–89
27 Nov	18:15	Japan	3–0	China	25–22	25–22	29–27			79–71
28 Nov	12:30	United States	3–2	Cuba	25–19	20–25	20–25	25–20	15–11	105–100
28 Nov	15:00	Spain	3–2	China	25–22	21–25	25–21	22–25	19-17	112-110
28 Nov	18:15	Japan	3–2	Tunisia	25–21	24–26	19–25	25–17	15–12	108–101

==== Site B ====
Venue: Nagoya Rainbow Hall, Nagoya

Date	Time		Score		Set 1	Set 2	Set 3	Set 4	Set 5	Total
26 Nov	13:30	Canada	3–2	Brazil	22–25	16–25	25–22	25–22	15–13	103–107
26 Nov	16:00	South Korea	3–2	Russia	18–25	15–25	25–23	25–22	15–11	98–106
26 Nov	18:35	Italy	3–2	Argentina	22–25	25–12	19–25	25–18	15–11	106–91
27 Nov	13:30	Brazil	3–0	South Korea	25–14	26–24	25–18			76–56
27 Nov	16:00	Russia	3–0	Argentina	25–20	25–17	25–19			75–56
27 Nov	18:35	Italy	3–0	Canada	27–25	25–19	25–14			77–58
28 Nov	13:30	Brazil	3–1	Argentina	23–25	25–17	25–15	25–19		98–76
28 Nov	16:00	Russia	3–0	Canada	25–19	30–28	25–21			80–68
28 Nov	18:35	Italy	3–0	South Korea	25–22	25–20	25–23			75–65

=== Fourth round ===
==== Site A ====
Venue: Yoyogi National Stadium, Tokyo

Date	Time		Score		Set 1	Set 2	Set 3	Set 4	Set 5	Total
30 Nov	12:30	Brazil	3–1	Spain	25–18	20–25	25–17	25–20		95–80
30 Nov	15:00	Russia	3–0	Cuba	25–15	25–23	25–18			75–56
30 Nov	18:15	Italy	3–0	Japan	25–19	25–18	25–12			75–49
1 Dec	12:30	Brazil	3–0	Cuba	25–23	25–20	25–20			75–63
1 Dec	15:00	Italy	3–2	Spain	25–18	22–25	30–32	25–23	15–12	117–110
1 Dec	18:15	Russia	3–0	Japan	33–31	25–20	25–12			83–63
2 Dec	12:30	Cuba	3–1	Italy	25–18	23–25	25–23	25–16		98–84
2 Dec	15:30	Spain	3–2	Russia	25–22	18–25	23-25	27-25	15–13	108–110
2 Dec	18:15	Brazil	3–1	Japan	25–16	23–25	25–19	25–16		98–76

==== Site B ====
Venue: Komazawa Gymnasium, Tokyo

Date	Time		Score		Set 1	Set 2	Set 3	Set 4	Set 5	Total
30 Nov	13:30	United States	3–0	Argentina	25–23	25–23	38–36			88–82
30 Nov	16:00	Canada	3–0	Tunisia	25–18	25–17	25–20			75–55
30 Nov	18:35	South Korea	3–0	China	25–22	25–17	25–19			75–58
1 Dec	13:30	Argentina	3–0	Tunisia	25–10	25–23	29–27			79–60
1 Dec	16:00	Canada	3–2	China	22–25	25–23	18–25	25–23	15–13	105–109
1 Dec	18:35	South Korea	3–1	United States	19–25	25–23	25–22	25–21		94–91
2 Dec	13:30	United States	3–1	Canada	25–21	20–25	26–24	25–20		96–90
2 Dec	16:00	South Korea	3–0	Tunisia	25–15	28–26	25–19			78–60
2 Dec	18:35	Argentina	3–1	China	25–22	25–20	19–25	25–23		94–90

== Final standing ==
Rank	Team
1st place, gold medalist(s)	Russia
2nd place, silver medalist(s)	Cuba
3rd place, bronze medalist(s)	Italy
4	United States
5	Brazil
6	Spain
7	South Korea
8	Canada
9	Argentina
10	Japan
11	China
12	Tunisia

Qualified for the 2000 Summer Olympics

1999 Men's World Cup champions

Russia
5th title

Team roster
Aleksey Kazakov, Ruslan Olikhver, Stanislav Dineykin, Konstantin Ushakov, Vadim Khamuttskikh, Roman Yakovlev, Aleksandr Gerasimov, Igor Shulepov, Ilya Savelev, Sergey Tetyukhin, Valeri Goryushev, Evgeni Mitkov
Head coach
Gennady Shipulin

== Awards ==
- Most valuable player
  (Russia) Roman Yakovlev
- Best scorer
  (Spain) Rafael Pascual
- Best spiker
  (Russia) Roman Yakovlev
- Best blocker
  (South Korea) Bang Sin-bong
- Best server
  (Cuba) Osvaldo Hernández
- Best digger
  (South Korea) Lee Ho
- Best setter
  (United States) Lloy Ball
- Best receiver
  (South Korea) Lee Ho
