= Ruslan Olikhver =

Russian volleyball player

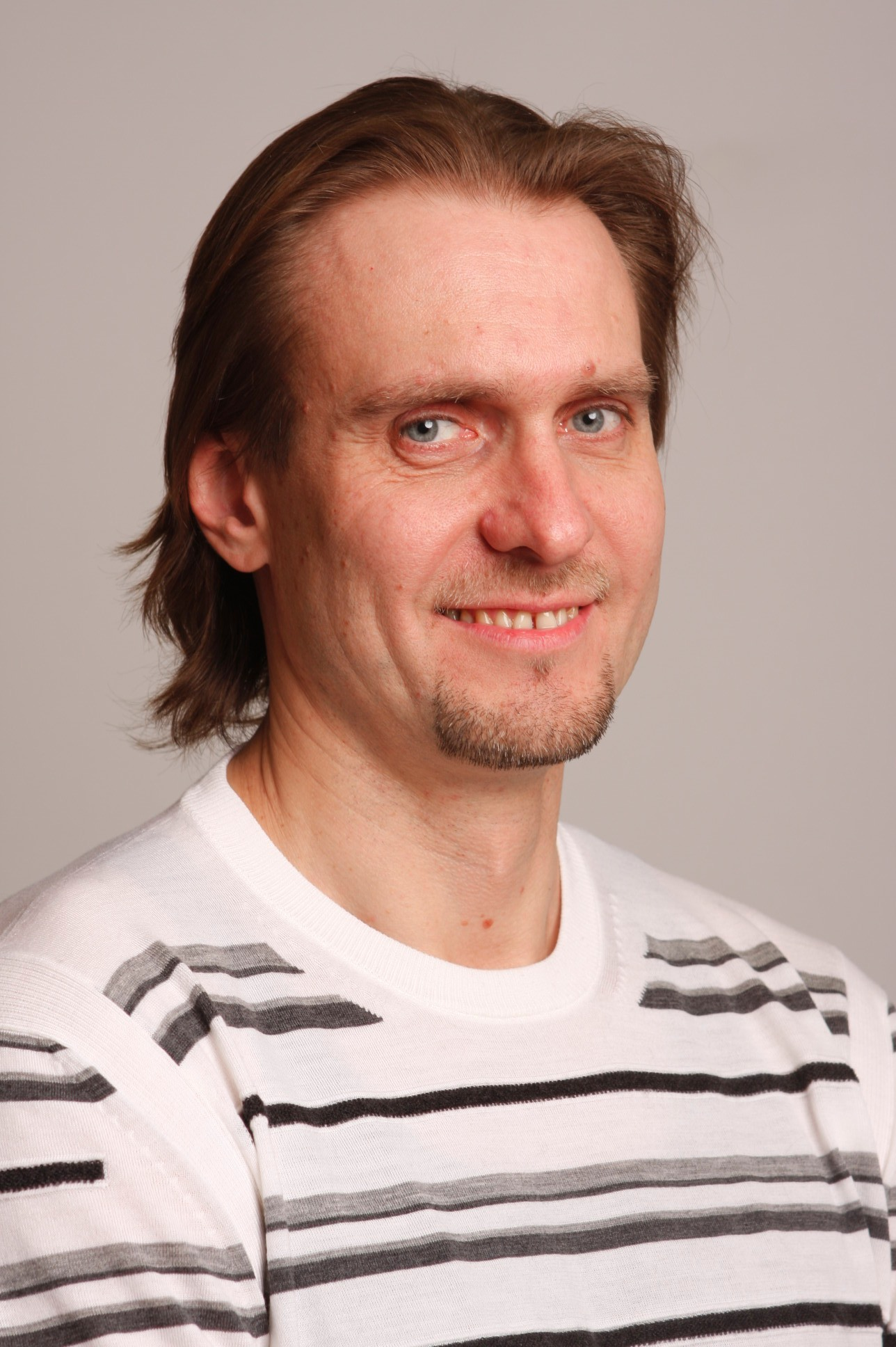

Personal information
- Full name: Ruslan Iosifovich Olikhver
- Nationality: Russian
- Born: 11 April 1969 (age 57); Riga, Latvia
- Height: 201 cm (6 ft 7 in)

Volleyball information
- Position: Middle blocker
- Number: 4 (national team)
Medal record
Men's volleyball
Representing Soviet Union
Representing Unified Team
Representing Russia
Olympic Games
Silver medal – second place	2000 Sydney	(Russia)
World Championship
Silver medal – second place	2002 Argentina	(Russia)
Bronze medal – third place	1990 Brazil	(Soviet Union)
World League
Gold medal – first place	2002 Brazil	(Russia)
Silver medal – second place	1993 Brazil	(Russia)
Silver medal – second place	1998 Italy	(Russia)
Silver medal – second place	2000 Netherlands	(Russia)
Bronze medal – third place	1997 Russia	(Russia)
World Cup
Gold medal – first place	1991 Japan	(Soviet Union)
Gold medal – first place	1999 Japan	(Russia)
Bronze medal – third place	1989 Japan	(Soviet Union)
Goodwill Games
Silver medal – second place	1990 Seattle	(Soviet Union)
European Championship
Gold medal – first place	1991 Germany	(Soviet Union)
Silver medal – second place	1999 Austria	(Russia)
Bronze medal – third place	1993 Finland	(Russia)
Bronze medal – third place	2001 Czech Republic	(Russia)
Junior World Championship
Gold medal – first place	1989 Greece	(Soviet Union)
Junior European Championship
Gold medal – first place	1988 Italy	(Soviet Union)

Ruslan Iosifovich Olikhver (Russian: Руслан Иосифович Олихвер; born 11 April 1969) is a Russian former volleyball player of Latvian origin who competed for the Unified Team in the 1992 Summer Olympics, and for Russia in the 1996 Summer Olympics and in the 2000 Summer Olympics.

In 1992, Olikhver was part of the Unified Team that finished seventh in the Olympic tournament. He played all eight matches.

Four years later, he finished fourth with the Russian team in the 1996 Olympic tournament. He played five matches.

At the 2000 Summer Olympics, he was a member of the Russian team that won the silver medal in the Olympic tournament. He played all eight matches.

== Club Honors ==
- (Soviet Union) Radiotechnik Riga, Soviet Top League (1989–1992);

- Soviet Top League Bronze Medalist (2) – 1990, 1991;
- CEV Cup Finalist (1) – 1991;

- (Italy) Las Daytona Modena, Italian A1 League (1993–95);

- Italian A1 League Champion (1) – 1995;
- Italian Cup Winner (2) – 1994, 1995;
- CEV Cup Winner's Cup Winner (1) – 1995;

- (Brazil) Report Suzano, Brazilian Superleague (1995–99);

- Brazilian Superleague Champion (1) – 1997;
- Brazilian Superleague Runner-up (2) – 1996, 1999;
- Brazilian Superleague Bronze Medalist (1) – 1998;

- (Italy) TNT Alpitour Cuneo, Italian A1 League (1999-00);

- Italian Supercup Winner (1) – 1999;
- CEV Cup Winner's Cup Finalist (1) – 2000;

- (Russia) MGTU-Luzhniki Moscow, Russian Super League (2001–2002);

- Russian Super League Runner-up (1) – 2002;

- (Russia) Dinamo Tattransgaz Kazan, Russian Super League (2002–06);

- Russian Super League Bronze Medalist (2) – 2004, 2005;
- Russian Cup Winner (1) – 2004;

- (Russia) Fakel Novy Urengoy, Russian Super League (2006–07);

- CEV Cup Winner (1) – 2007;
