= Evgeni Mitkov =

Russian volleyball player (born 1972)

Personal information
- Full name: Evgeni Viktorovich Mitkov
- Nationality: Russian
- Born: 23 March 1972 (age 54); Shelekhov, Russian SFSR, Soviet Union
- Height: 194 cm (6 ft 4 in)
Medal record
Men's volleyball
Representing Russia
Olympic Games
Silver medal – second place	2000 Sydney	Team
World Cup
Gold medal – first place	1999 Japan	Team

Evgeni Viktorovich Mitkov (Russian: Евгений Викторович Митьков; born 23 March 1972) is a Russian volleyball player who competed in the 2000 Summer Olympics.

He was born in Shelekhov.

In 2000 he was part of the Russian team which won the silver medal in the Olympic tournament. He played all eight matches.
