= Lee Ho (volleyball) =

South Korean volleyball player (born 1973)

Personal information
- Nationality: South Korean
- Born: 24 April 1973 (age 53)

Sport
- Sport: Volleyball

Lee Ho (born 24 April 1973) is a South Korean volleyball player. He competed in the men's tournament at the 2000 Summer Olympics.
