= Yelena Pshikova =

Russian basketball player

Yelena Pshikova (born 1 June 1970) is a Russian former basketball player who competed in the 1996 Summer Olympics and in the 2000 Summer Olympics.
