= Tatyana Grachova =

Russian volleyball player (born 1973)

Tatyana Gracheva
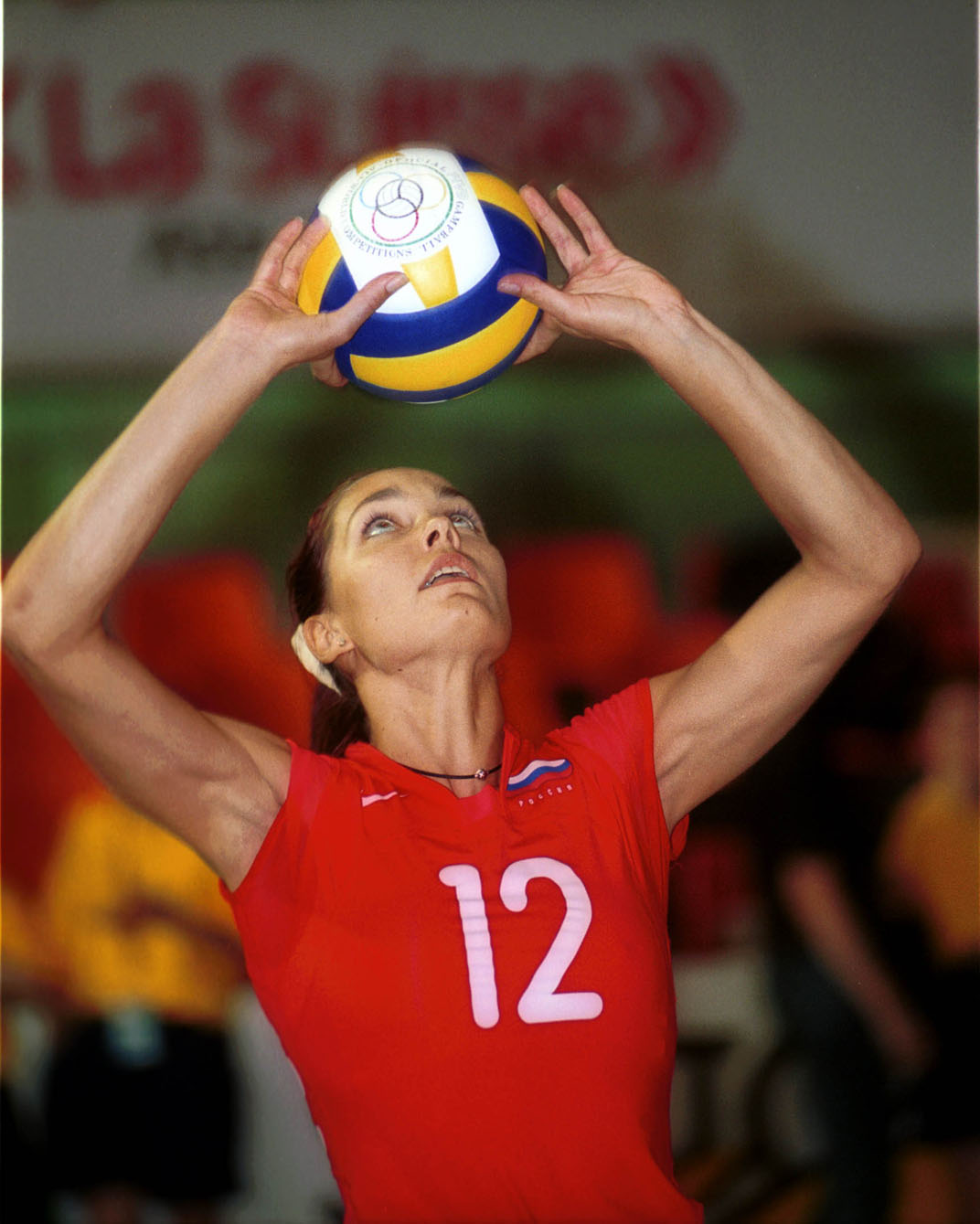

Personal information
- Full name: Tatyana Aleksandrovna Gracheva
- Born: 23 February 1973 (age 53); Yekaterinburg, Russia
- Height: 180 cm (5 ft 11 in)
- Weight: 72 kg (159 lb)
- Spike: 300 cm (118 in)
- Block: 290 cm (114 in)

Volleyball information
- Position: Setter
- Number: 12 (national team)

Career
Years	Teams
1990—1991; 1991—1992; 1992—1995; 1995—1996; 1996—2001; 2001—2002; 2005—2008	(Soviet Union) Uralochka Ekaterinburgo (Croatia) Mladost Zagreb (Russia) Uralochka Ekaterinburgo (Croatia) Mladost Zagreb (Russia) Uralochka Ekaterinburgo (Turkey) Eczacıbaşı VitrA (Russia) Dynamo Moscow

National team
1992-2002	Russia
Honours
Women's volleyball
Representing Russia
Olympic Games
Silver medal – second place	2000 Sydney	Team
World Championship
Bronze medal – third place	1994 Brazil	Team
Bronze medal – third place	2002 Germany	Team
World Grand Champions Cup
Gold medal – first place	1997 Japan	Team
Silver medal – second place	2001 Japan	Team
Bronze medal – third place	1993 Japan	Team
FIVB World Grand Prix
Gold medal – first place	1997 Kobe	Team
Gold medal – first place	2002 Hong Kong	Team
Silver medal – second place	2000 Manila	Team
Bronze medal – third place	1993 Hong Kong	Team
Bronze medal – third place	1996 Shangai	Team
Bronze medal – third place	2001 Macau	Team
European Championship
Gold medal – first place	1993 Brno–Zlín	Team
Gold medal – first place	1997 Brno	Team
Gold medal – first place	2001 Sofia–Varna	Team
Bronze medal – third place	1995 Arnhem–Groningen	Team
Goodwill Games
Gold medal – first place	1994 St. Petersburg	Team

Tatyana Aleksandrovna Grachova (Russian: Татьяна Александровна Грачёва; born 23 February 1973) is a Russian volleyball player. She was a member of the national team that won the silver medal in the Sydney 2000 Olympic Games. She also competed in the 1996 Summer Olympics.
