= Igor Shulepov =

Russian volleyball player (born 1972)

Personal information
- Full name: Igor Yuryevich Shulepov
- Nationality: Russian
- Born: 16 November 1972 (age 53); Yekaterinburg, Sverdlovsk, Russia
- Height: 203 cm (6 ft 8 in)
Medal record
Men's volleyball
Representing Russia
Olympic Games
Silver medal – second place	2000 Sydney	Team
World Cup
Gold medal – first place	1999 Japan	Team

Igor Shulepov (Russian: Игорь Шулепов; born 16 November 1972) is a Russian volleyball player born in Yekaterinburg who competed in the 1996 Summer Olympics and in the 2000 Summer Olympics. In 1996 he was part of the Russian team which finished fourth in the Olympic tournament. He played all eight matches. Four years later he won the silver medal with the Russian team in the 2000 Olympic tournament. He played all eight matches again.
