= Yelena Vasilevskaya =

Russian volleyball player (born 1978)

Personal information
- Full name: Yelena Vasilyevna Vasilevskaya
- Born: 27 February 1978 (age 48) Sverdlovsk, Russia
- Height: 1.76 m (5 ft 9 in)

Volleyball information
- Position: Setter
- Number: 10
Honours
Women's volleyball
Representing Russia
Olympic Games
Silver medal – second place	2000 Sydney	Team
World Championship
Bronze medal – third place	1998 Japan	Team
FIVB World Cup
Silver medal – second place	1999 Japan	Team
European Championship
Gold medal – first place	1997 Brno	Team
Gold medal – first place	1999 Rome–Perugia	Team
Gold medal – first place	2001 Sofia–Varna	Team

Yelena Vasilyevna Vasilevskaya (Russian: Елена Васильевна Василевская; born 27 February 1978) is a Russian volleyball player. She was a member of the national team that won the silver medal in the Sydney 2000 Olympic Games.
