= Inessa Korkmaz =

Russian volleyball player (born 1972)

Personal information
- Full name: Inessa Yevgenyevna Sargsyan (Yemelyanova-, -Korkmaz)
- Born: 17 January 1972 (age 54); Saratov, Soviet Union
- Height: 1.90 m (6 ft 3 in)

National team
1991; 1992; 1993—2004; 2004—2009	Soviet Union; CIS; Russia; Azerbaijan
Honours
Women's volleyball
Representing Russia
Olympic Games
Silver medal – second place	2000 Sydney	Team
World Championship
Bronze medal – third place	1994 Brazil	Team
FIVB World Cup
Silver medal – second place	1999 Japan	Team
Representing Soviet Union
FIVB World Cup
Bronze medal – third place	1991 Japan	Team

Inessa Korkmaz (born 17 January 1972) is a retired female volleyball player from Russia, who is also known as Inessa Emelyanova. She made her debut for the Soviet National Team in 1989. In 2004, she began representing Azerbaijan in international volleyball competitions.

== Honours ==
- 1991 FIVB World Cup — 3rd place
- 1993 FIVB World Grand Prix — 3rd place
- 1993 European Championship — 1st place
- 1994 World Championship — 3rd place
- 1995 European Championship — 3rd place
- 1996 FIVB World Grand Prix — 3rd place
- 1997 FIVB World Grand Prix — 1st place
- 1997 European Championship — 1st place
- 1999 FIVB World Cup — 2nd place
- 2000 FIVB World Grand Prix — 2nd place
- 2000 Olympic Games — 2nd place
- 2001 FIVB World Grand Prix — 3rd place
- 2001 European Championship — 1st place
- 2005 European Championship — 4th place
- 2006 FIVB World Grand Prix — 10th place
- 2007 European Championship — 12th place
