= Lyubov Yudina =

Russian swimmer

Personal information
- Born: January 13, 1981 (age 45) Volgograd, Russian SFSR, Soviet Union
- Height: 1.68 m (5 ft 6 in)
- Weight: 50 kg (110 lb)

Sport
- Sport: Swimming
- Club: Volga Club

Lyubov Yudina (Russian: Любовь Юдина; born 13 January 1981) is a Russian swimmer. She competed at the 2000 Summer Olympics in the 4×100 m and 4×200 m freestyle relays and finished in tenth place in both events.
