= Olga Potachova =

Russian volleyball player (born 1976)

Personal information
- Born: 26 June 1976 (age 50) Potsdam, Germany
Medal record
Women's volleyball
Representing Russia
Olympic Games
Silver medal – second place	2000 Sydney	Team competition
FIVB World Grand Prix
Bronze medal – third place	2001 Macau	Team competition
European Championship
Gold medal – first place	2001 Sofia-Varna	Team competition

Olga Dmitrievna Potachova (Russian: Ольга Дмитриевна Поташова; born 26 June 1976) is a Russian volleyball player. She was a member of the national team that won the silver medal in the Sydney 2000 Olympic Games. She is 2.04 metres (6 ft 8.5 in) tall, making her one of the tallest female athletes in the world. She had to retire in 2004 due to health problems.
