= Aleksandr Gerasimov (volleyball) =

Russian volleyball player (born 1975)

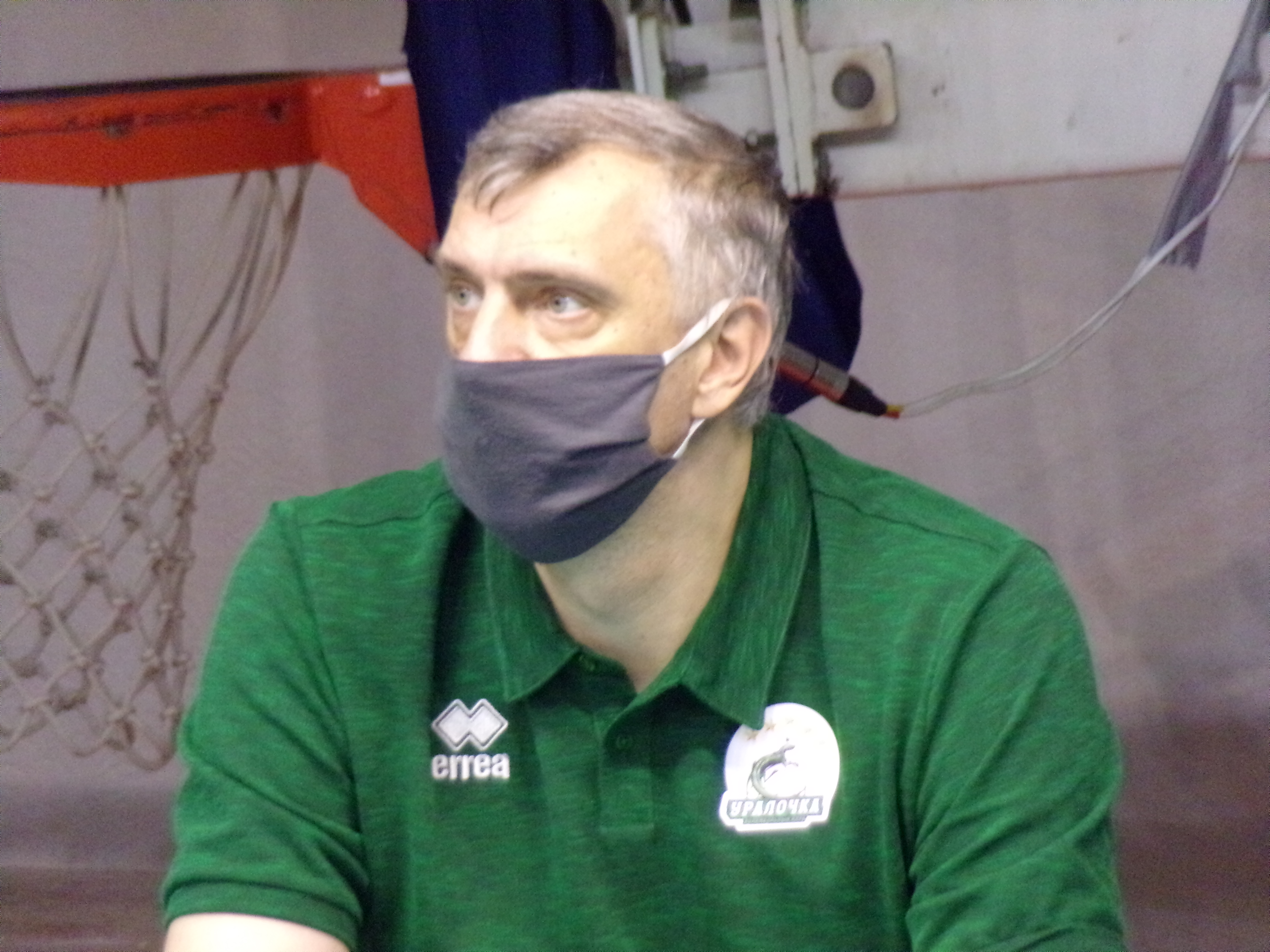
- Gerasimov in 2021

Personal information
- Full name: Aleksandr Georgievich Gerasimov
- Born: 22 January 1975 (age 51) Ekaterinburg, Russia
- Height: 201 cm (6 ft 7 in)
Medal record
Men's volleyball
Representing Russia
Olympic Games
Silver medal – second place	2000 Sydney	Team
World Cup
Gold medal – first place	1999 Japan	Team
European Championship
Bronze medal – third place	2001 Ostrava	Team

Aleksandr Georgievich Gerasimov (Russian: Александр Герасимов; born 22 January 1975) is a retired volleyball player from Russia.

He was born in Ekaterinburg.

Gerasimov was a member of the men's national team that won the silver medal at the 2000 Summer Olympics in Sydney, Australia. He also won the 2002 Volleyball World League with Russia, and the 1999 World Cup.
