= Vadim Khamuttskikh =

Russian volleyball player (1969–2021)

Personal information
- Full name: Vadim Anatolyevich Khamuttskikh
- Nationality: Russian
- Born: 26 November 1969; Asha, Chelyabinsk Oblast, USSR
- Died: 31 December 2021 (aged 52); Belgorod, Russia
Medal record
Men's volleyball
Representing Russia
Olympic Games
Silver medal – second place	2000 Sydney	Team
Bronze medal – third place	2004 Athens	Team
Bronze medal – third place	2008 Beijing	Team
World Cup
Gold medal – first place	1999 Japan	Team
Silver medal – second place	2007 Japan	Team
European Championship
Silver medal – second place	2007 Russia	Team
Bronze medal – third place	2001 Ostrava	Team

Vadim Anatolyevich Khamuttskikh (Russian: Вадим Анатольевич Хамутцких; 26 November 1969 – 31 December 2021) was a Russian volleyball player, who was a member of the men's national team that won the silver medal at the 2000 Summer Olympics in Sydney, Australia and the 2007 European Championship in Moscow, Russia. There he was named Best Setter of the tournament.

Khamuttskikh also competed at the 2004 Summer Olympics in Athens, Greece, where Russia claimed the bronze medal by defeating the United States in the play-off for the third place, and at the 2008 Summer Olympics in Beijing, China. He also competed at the 1996 Summer Olympics. He died on 31 December 2021, at the age of 52.

== Individual awards ==
- 2007 European Championship Best Setter

== Sources ==
- "Vadim Khamuttskikh". FIVB.org. International Volleyball Federation.
- Evans, Hilary; Gjerde, Arild; Heijmans, Jeroen; Mallon, Bill; et al. "Vadim Khamuttskikh". Olympics at Sports-Reference.com. Sports Reference LLC. Archived from the original on 3 December 2016. "Full name: Vadim Anatolyevich Khamuttskikh / Original name: Вадим Анатольевич Хамутцких"
