= Aleksandr Bashminov =

Russian basketball player

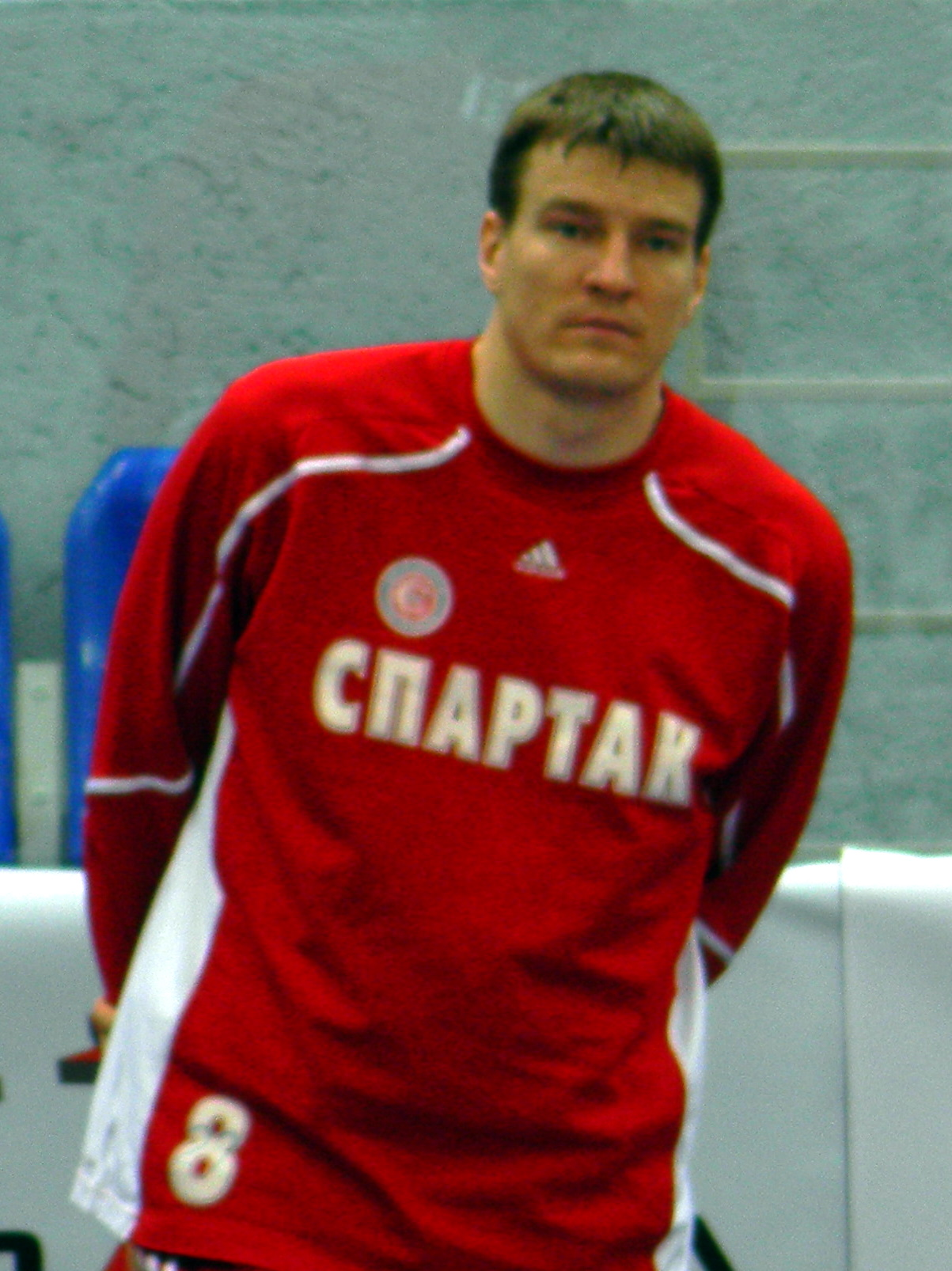
- Aleksandr Bashminov in 2011

Personal information
- Nationality: Russian
- Born: 7 May 1978 (age 47); Cheboksary, Russian SFSR, Soviet Union
- Height: 212 cm (6 ft 11 in)

Sport
- Sport: Basketball

Aleksandr Bashminov (born 7 May 1978) is a Russian basketball player. He competed in the men's tournament at the 2000 Summer Olympics.

He is 212 cm (6 feet 11 1/2 inches) tall.
