= Valeri Goryushev =

Russian volleyball player (1973–2014)

Personal information
- Nationality: Russian
- Born: 26 April 1973
- Died: 28 April 2014 (aged 41)
- Height: 198 cm (6 ft 6 in)

Volleyball information
- Number: 17 (national team)

Career
- Years: Team
- 1994: Dinamo Mosca

National team
- Years: Team
- 1994-2000: Russia
Medal record
Men's volleyball
Representing Russia
Olympic Games
Silver medal – second place	2000 Sydney	Team
World Cup
Gold medal – first place	1999 Japan	Team

Valeri Goryushev (Russian: Валерий Гордюшев; 26 April 1973 – 28 April 2014) was a Russian volleyball player who competed in the 1996 Summer Olympics and in the 2000 Summer Olympics. He was born in Yekaterinburg. In 1996 he was part of the Russian team which finished fourth in the Olympic tournament. He played seven matches. Four years later he won the silver medal with the Russian team in the 2000 Olympic tournament. He played two matches.
