= Dmitry Kuzelev =

Russian handball player

Personal information
- Nationality: Russian
- Born: 1 November 1969 (age 56) Kemerovo Oblast, Soviet Union
- Height: 196 cm (77 in)

Sport
- Sport: Handball
- Position: Pivot
- Current club: Retired

Senior clubs
- Years: Team
- -1998: Chekhovskiye Medvedi
- 1998-2007: GWD Minden
- 2007-2009: Aarhus GF
- 2009-2011: Orlen Wisła Płock
- 2009-2011: SKIF Krasnodar
National team
Years	Team	Apps
–	Russia	58
Medal record
Representing Russia
Men's handball
Olympic Games
Gold medal – first place	2000 Sydney	Team
European Championships
Silver medal – second place	2000 Croatia	Team

Dmitry Leonidovich Kuzelev (Russian: Дмитрий Леонидович Кузелев; born 1 November 1969) is a Russian handball player.

He played for the Russia men's national handball team at the 2000 Summer Olympics in Sydney, where Russia won the gold medal. He also won silver medals at the 2000 European Championship, losing to Sweden in the final.

== Club career ==
He started his career at Chekhovskiye Medvedi in Moscow, where he won the Russian championship in 1994 and 1995. In 1998 he joined German side GWD Minden. He played 274 games for the club, scoring 1010 goals, which made him one of the most prolific goalscorers on the team

After 9 years at the club he left to join Danish side Aarhus GF.

Two years later he joined Polish team Orlen Wisła Płock. In 2011, he won the Polish Championship with the club.

For the 2011-12 he returned to Russia to join SKIF Krasnodar.
