= Ilya Savelev =

Russian volleyball player (born 1971)

Personal information
- Nationality: Russian
- Born: 10 June 1971 (age 55); Moscow, Russia
- Height: 202 cm (6 ft 8 in)

Volleyball information
- Number: 5 (national team)

Career
Years	Teams
1994	Cariparma Parma Italy

National team
1994	Russia
Medal record
Men's volleyball
Representing Russia
Olympic Games
Silver medal – second place	2000 Sydney	Team
World Cup
Gold medal – first place	1999 Japan	Team

Ilya Savelev (Russian: Илья Савельев; born 10 June 1971) is a Russian volleyball player who competed in the 2000 Summer Olympics.

In 2000 he was part of the Russian team which won the silver medal in the Olympic tournament. He played seven matches.
