= Roman Yakovlev =

Russian volleyball player (born 1976)

Personal information
- Full name: Roman Nikolayevich Yakovlev
- Nationality: Russian
- Born: 13 August 1976 (age 50); Kharkiv, Ukrainian SSR, Soviet Union
- Height: 2.02 m (6 ft 8 in)
- Weight: 102 kg (225 lb)
- Spike: 344 cm (135 in)
- Block: 332 cm (131 in)

Volleyball information
- Position: Opposite
- Number: 10

Career
Years	Teams
1995–1999; 1999–2000; 2000–2004; 2004–2005; 2005–2008; 2008–2009; 2009–2011; 2011–2012; 2012–2013; 2013–2014; 2014; 2015	Belogorie-Dinamo Belgorod; Volley Forlì; Daytona Modena; Iskra Odintsovo; Fakel Novy Urengoy; Dinamo-Yantar Kaliningrad; Dinamo Moscow; Dinamo Krasnodar; Iskra Odintsovo; Zenit Kazan; Ural Ufa; NOVA Novokuybyshevsk

National team
1998–2003, 2011	Russia
Honours
Men's volleyball
Representing Russia
Olympic Games
Silver medal – second place	2000 Sydney	Team
World Championship
Silver medal – second place	2002 Argentina
World Cup
Gold medal – first place	1999 Japan
Gold medal – first place	2011 Japan
World League
Gold medal – first place	2002 Belo Horizonte
Silver medal – second place	1998 Milan
Silver medal – second place	2000 Rotterdam
Bronze medal – third place	2001 Katowice
European Championship
Silver medal – second place	1999 Austria
Bronze medal – third place	2001 Czech Republic
Bronze medal – third place	2003 Germany

Roman Nikolayevich Yakovlev (Russian: Роман Николаевич Яковлев; born 13 August 1976) is a Russian former volleyball player. Yakovlev played for the Russia men's national volleyball team that won the silver medal at the 2000 Summer Olympics in Sydney. He led Russia to the gold medal at the 1999 FIVB World Cup in Japan, and was named the MVP of the tournament. Two years later he won the Volleyball World League (2002) with Russia.

== Individual awards ==
- 1999 FIVB World Cup "Most Valuable Player"
- 1999 FIVB World Cup "Best Spiker"
- 2000 Serie A1 League MVP
