= Aleksey Kazakov =

Russian volleyball player

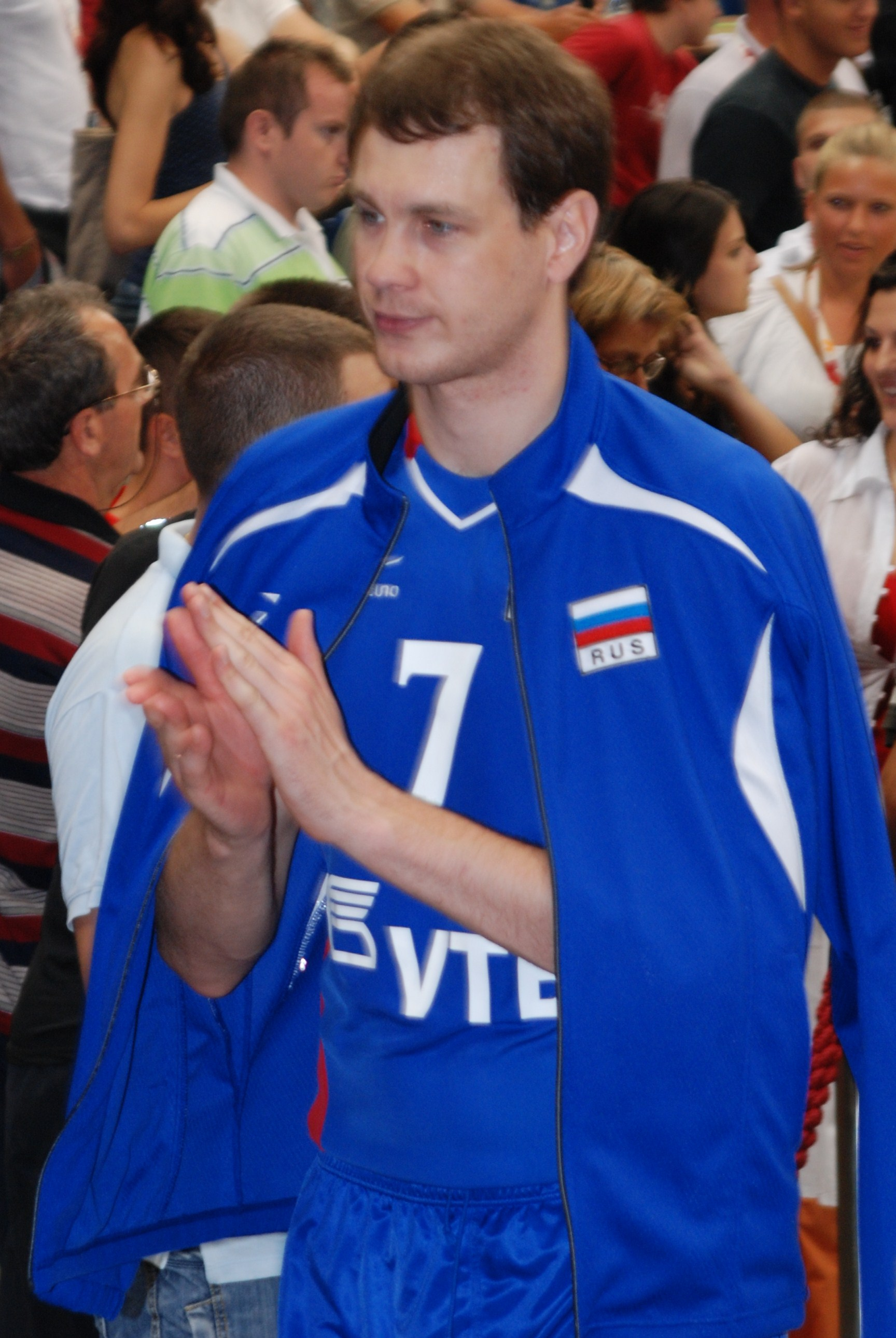

Personal information
- Full name: Aleksey Valerevich Kazakov
- Nationality: Russian
- Born: 18 March 1976 (age 50)
- Height: 217 cm (7 ft 1 in)

Volleyball information
- Number: 7
Medal record
Men's volleyball
Representing Russia
Olympic Games
Silver medal – second place	2000 Sydney	Team
Bronze medal – third place	2004 Athens	Team
World Cup
Gold medal – first place	1999 Japan	Team
European Championship
Bronze medal – third place	2001 Ostrava	Team

Aleksey Valerevich Kazakov (Russian: Алексей Валерьевич Казаков; born 18 March 1976) is a Russian volleyball player.

He was born in Naberezhnye Chelny, Tatar Autonomous Soviet Socialist Republic.

Kazakov was a member of the national team that won the bronze medal at the 2004 Summer Olympics in Athens. Four years earlier in Sydney he gained the silver medal. He is 2.17 metres tall, making him one of the tallest athletes in the world.
