= New Zealand at the 2000 Summer Olympics =

- IOC code: NZL
- NOC: New Zealand Olympic Committee
- Website: www.olympic.org.nz

in Sydney
- Competitors: 151
- Flag bearer: Blyth Tait
- Medals Ranked 46th: Gold 1 Silver 0 Bronze 3 Total 4

Summer Olympics appearances (overview)
- 1908; 1912; 1920; 1924; 1928; 1932; 1936; 1948; 1952; 1956; 1960; 1964; 1968; 1972; 1976; 1980; 1984; 1988; 1992; 1996; 2000; 2004; 2008; 2012; 2016; 2020; 2024; 2028

Other related appearances
- Australasia (1908–1912)

New Zealand competed at the 2000 Summer Olympics in Sydney, Australia. The New Zealand Olympic Committee was represented by 151 athletes and 100 officials at these Summer Olympics.

== Medallists ==
Medal	Name	Sport	Event	Date
Gold	Rob Waddell	Rowing	Men's single sculls	23 September
Bronze	Mark Todd	Equestrian	Individual eventing	22 September
Bronze	Aaron McIntosh	Sailing	Men's Mistral	24 September
Bronze	Barbara Kendall	Sailing	Women's Mistral	24 September

Medals by sport
Sport	Gold medal	Silver medal	Bronze medal	Total
Rowing	1	0	0	1
Sailing	0	0	2	2
Equestrian	0	0	1	1
Total	1	0	3	4

Medals by gender
Gender	Gold medal	Silver medal	Bronze medal	Total
Male	1	0	1	2
Female	0	0	1	1
Mixed / open	0	0	1	1
Total	1	0	3	4

== Archery ==
Athlete	Event	Ranking round		Round of 64	Round of 32	Round of 16	Quarterfinal	Semifinal	Final	Rank
Athlete	Event	Points	Rank	Opposition Result	Opposition Result	Opposition Result	Opposition Result	Opposition Result	Opposition Result	Rank
Peter Ebden	Men's individual	607	48	Tsyrempilov (RUS); L 147–168	did not advance					58
Ken Uprichard	Men's individual	596	56	Needham (GBR); L 155–160	did not advance					48

== Athletics ==
Key

- Note – Ranks given for track events are within the athlete's heat only
- Q = Qualified for the next round
- q = Qualified for the next round as a fastest loser or, in field events, by position without achieving the qualifying target
- N/A = Round not applicable for the event

=== Track and road ===
Athlete	Event	Heat		Semifinal		Final	
Athlete	Event	Result	Rank	Result	Rank	Result	Rank
Michael Aish	Men's 10,000 m	29:31.83	17	—N/a		did not advance	
Craig Barrett	Men's 50 km walk	—N/a				3:55:53	18
Toni Hodgkinson	Women's 800 m	1:59.37	4 q	1:59.84	6	did not advance	
Toni Hodgkinson	Women's 1500 m	4:12.59	9	did not advance			

=== Field ===
Athlete	Event	Qualification		Final	
Athlete	Event	Result	Rank	Result	Rank
Chantal Brunner	Women's long jump	6.42	22	did not advance	
Beatrice Faumuina	Women's discus throw	61.33	9 q	58.69	12
Glenn Howard	Men's igh jump	2.15	27	did not advance	
Tasha Williams	Women's hammer throw	61.18	17	did not advance	
Ian Winchester	Men's discus throw	58.64	31	did not advance	

== Basketball ==
=== Men's ===
- Preliminary round

- Lost to France (50–76)
- Lost to China (60–75)
- Lost to Italy (66–78)
- Lost to United States (56–102)
- Lost to Lithuania (75–85)

- Classification match

- 11th-12th place: Defeated Angola (70–60) → 11th place

- Team roster

- Pero Cameron
- Mark Dickel
- Paul Henare
- Robert Hickey
- Phill Jones
- Ralph Lattimore
- Sean Marks
- Kirk Penney
- Peter Pokai
- Tony Rampton
- Brad Riley
- Nenad Vučinić

=== Women's ===
- Preliminary round

- Lost to Poland (52–72)
- Lost to Korea (62–101)
- Lost to Cuba (55–74)
- Lost to United States (42–93)
- Lost to Russia (54–92)

- Classification match

- 11th-12th place: Defeated Senegal (72–69) → 11th place

- Team roster

- Tania Brunton
- Belinda Colling
- Megan Compain
- Rebecca Cotton
- Kirstin Daly
- Gina Farmer
- Sally Farmer
- Dianne L'Ami
- Donna Loffhagen
- Julie Ofsoski
- Leone Patterson
- Leanne Walker

== Boxing ==
Athlete	Event	Round of 16	Quarterfinals	Semifinals	Final	Rank
Athlete	Event	Opposition Result	Opposition Result	Opposition Result	Opposition Result	Rank
Angus Shelford	Men's super heavyweight	Mazikin (UKR); L 5–19	did not advance			=9

== Cycling ==
=== Mountain bike ===
Athlete	Event	Time	Rank
Kashi Leuchs	Men's cross-country	2:16:37.57	17
Susy Pryde	Women's cross-country	DNF	

=== Road ===
Men

Athlete	Event	Time	Rank
Christopher Jenner	Road race	5:30:46	47
Julian Dean	Road race	5:30:46	61
Scott Guyton	Road race	5:43:21	85
Glen Mitchell	Road race	DNF	

Women

Athlete	Event	Time	Rank
Jacinta Coleman	Road race	3:06:31	18
Rosalind Reekie-May	Road race	3:10:34	36
Susy Pryde	Road race	DNF	

=== Track ===
Time trial

Athlete	Event	Time	Rank
Matt Sinton	Men's time trial	1:05.706	11
Fiona Ramage	Women's time trial	36.536	16

Sprint

Athlete	Event	Qualifying		1/16 finals	1/16 repechage	1/8 finals	1/8 repechage	Quarterfinal	Semifinal	Final / BM / Pl.	
Athlete	Event	Time	Rank	Opposition Time	Opposition Time	Opposition Time	Opposition Time	Opposition Time	Opposition Time	Opposition Time	Rank
Anthony Peden	Men's sprint	10.649	15 Q	DNS	Did not advance						
Fiona Ramage	Women's sprint	11.803	11	—N/a		Grichina (RUS); L	Lindenmuth (USA); Freitag (GER); L	Did not advance		Classification 9-12; Freitag (GER); Kasslin (FIN); Freitag (CHN); L 2	10

Keirin

Athlete	Event	First round	Repechage	Second round	Final
Athlete	Event	Rank	Rank	Rank	Rank
Anthony Peden	Men's keirin	DNF	3	Did not advance	
Matt Sinton	Men's keirin	5	4	Did not advance	

Points race

Athlete	Event	Points	Rank
Glen Thomson	Men's points race	6	7
Sarah Ulmer	Women's points race	9	8

Pursuit

Athlete	Event	Qualifying		Quarterfinal		Semifinal		Final / BM	
Athlete	Event	Time	Rank	Opposition Time	Rank	Opposition Time	Rank	Opposition Time	Rank
Gary Anderson	Men's individual	4:32.304	14	—N/a		Did not advance			
Tim Carswell; Lee Vertongen; Gary Anderson; Greg Henderson	Men's team pursuit	4:08.463	6	France; L 4:06.495	6	Did not advance			
Sarah Ulmer	Women's individual	3:36.764	4	—N/a		Zijlaard (NED); Overtaken L	4	McGregor (GBR); 3:38.930 L	4

== Equestrian ==
=== Dressage ===
Athlete	Horse	Event	Round 1		Round 2		After 2 rounds		Round 3		Total score	Rank
Athlete	Horse	Event	Score	Rank	Score	Rank	Score	Rank	Score	Rank	Total score	Rank
Kallista Field	Waikare	Individual	66.44	21 Q	68.04	18	134.48	18	did not advance			

=== Eventing ===
Rider	Horse	Event	Dressage		Cross-country		Jumping		Overall	
Rider	Horse	Event	Points	Rank	Points	Rank	Points	Rank	Points	Rank
Blyth Tait	Welton Envoy	Individual	40.80	7	DNF		Retired			
Mark Todd	Eyespy II	Individual	39.00	4	0.00	=1	3.00	6	42.00	3rd place, bronze medalist(s)
Vaughn Jefferis; Paul O'Brien; Blyth Tait; Mark Todd	Bounce; Enzed; Ready Teddy; Diamond Hall Re	Team	40.60; 51.00; 52.00; 58.60	5	0.00; 59.60; 0.00; 0.00	1	Withdrawn; Withdrawn; Eliminated; 7.00	8	2065.60	8

=== Jumping ===
Athlete	Horse	Event	Qualifying					Final				Total	Rank
Athlete	Horse	Event	Round 1	Round 2	Round 3	Total points	Rank	Round 1	Rank	Round 2	Rank	Total	Rank
Peter Breakwell	Leonson	Individual	20.75	12.00	16.00	48.75	55	did not advance					
Bruce Goodin	Lenaro	Individual	0.50	8.00	12.00	20.50	20 Q	16.00	=33	did not advance			

== Field hockey ==
=== Women's team competition ===
- Preliminary round (Pool B)

- New Zealand – Germany 1–1
- New Zealand – China 0–2
- New Zealand – The Netherlands 3–4
- New Zealand – South Africa 1–0

- Medal pool

- New Zealand – Australia 0–3
- New Zealand – Spain 2–2
- New Zealand – Argentina 1–7 (→ Sixth Place)

- Team roster

- Anne-Marie Irving (gk)
- Helen Clarke (gk)
- Sandy Bennett
- Diana Weavers
- Rachel Petrie
- Jenny Duck
- Caryn Paewai
- Skippy Hamahona
- Anna Lawrence
- Suzie Muirhead
- Tina Bell-Kake
- Moira Senior
- Kylie Foy
- Kate Trolove
- Michelle Turner
- Mandy Smith

== Gymnastics ==
=== Artistic ===
David Phillips and Laura Robertson represented New Zealand in the sport of artistic gymnastics at the 2000 Summer Olympics.

Women

Athlete	Event	Qualification						Final					
Athlete	Event	Apparatus				Total	Rank	Apparatus				Total	Rank
Athlete	Event	V	UB	BB	F	Total	Rank	V	UB	BB	F	Total	Rank
Laura Robertson	All-around	8.899	8.600	8.837	9.012	35.348	57	did not advance					

== Judo ==
Men

Athlete	Event	First round	Round of 32	Round of 16	Quarterfinal	Semifinal	Repechage 1	Repechage 2	Repechage 3	Repechage 4	Final / BM	
Athlete	Event	Opposition Result	Opposition Result	Opposition Result	Opposition Result	Opposition Result	Opposition Result	Opposition Result	Opposition Result	Opposition Result	Opposition Result	Rank
Brendon Crooks	–60 kg	Ismayilov (AZE); L 0001–1012	Did not advance									
Timothy Slyfield	–81 kg	Omagbaluwaje (NGR); W 1000–0020	Tölgyesi (HUN); L 0010–0011	Did not advance								
Daniel Gowing	–100 kg	Bye	López (VEN); W 1101–0000	Inoue (JPN); L 0000–1000	Did not advance							

Women

Athlete	Event	First round	Round of 32	Round of 16	Quarterfinal	Semifinal	Repechage 1	Repechage 2	Repechage 3	Repechage 4	Final / BM	
Athlete	Event	Opposition Result	Opposition Result	Opposition Result	Opposition Result	Opposition Result	Opposition Result	Opposition Result	Opposition Result	Opposition Result	Opposition Result	Rank
Fiona Iredale	+78 kg	—N/a	Riley (PAN); W	Yuan (CHN); L	Did not advance		Bye	Marques (BRA); L	Did not advance			

== Rowing ==
New Zealand qualified three boats for the 2000 Summer Olympics: men's single sculls, men's coxless four, and women's single sculls.

Men

Athlete	Event	Heats		Repechage		Semifinals		Final	
Athlete	Event	Time	Rank	Time	Rank	Time	Rank	Time	Rank
Rob Waddell	Single sculls	6:54.20	1 SA/B	Bye		6:58.01	1 FA	6:48.90	1st place, gold medalist(s)
Scott Brownlee; Toni Dunlop; Rob Hellstrom; Dave Schaper	Four	6:13.60	2 SA/B	Bye		6:05.33	3 FA	6:09.13	6

Women

Athlete	Event	Heats		Repechage		Semifinals		Final	
Athlete	Event	Time	Rank	Time	Rank	Time	Rank	Time	Rank
Sonia Waddell	Single sculls	7:40.18	1 SA/B	Bye		7:35.24	3 FA	7:43.71	6

Qualification legend: FA=Final A (medal); SA/B=Semifinals A/B

== Sailing ==
Men

Athlete	Event	Race											Net points	Rank
Athlete	Event	1	2	3	4	5	6	7	8	9	10	11	Net points	Rank
Aaron McIntosh	Mistral	~~37~~; ~~OCS~~	9	4	10	9	3	1	5	~~12~~	3	4	48	3rd place, bronze medalist(s)
Clifton Webb	Finn	15	9	15	10	2	11	16	4	16	~~18~~	~~26~~; ~~OCS~~	109	16
Simon Cooke; Peter Nicholas	470	6	~~15~~	9	12	10	12	~~15~~	3	3	13	8	76	7

Women

Athlete	Event	Race											Net points	Rank
Athlete	Event	1	2	3	4	5	6	7	8	9	10	11	Net points	Rank
Barbara Kendall	Mistral	2	3	2	3	~~7~~	1	3	1	~~5~~	1	3	19	3rd place, bronze medalist(s)
Sarah Macky	Europe	12	1	14	~~16~~	12	11	5	~~15~~	6	3	15	79	9
Melinda Henshaw; Jenny Egnot	470	13	3	6	1	7	10	6	~~19~~	~~20~~; ~~OCS~~	16	10	72	11

Open

Fleet racing

Athlete	Event	Race																Net points	Rank
Athlete	Event	1	2	3	4	5	6	7	8	9	10	11	12	13	14	15	16	Net points	Rank
Peter Fox	Laser	14	19	13	~~44~~; ~~OCS~~	22	20	7	18	23	8	~~24~~	—N/a					144	21
Chris Dickson; Glen Sowry	Tornado	5	2	7	~~15~~	10	1	5	7	~~12~~	3	6	—N/a					46	5
Gavin Brady; Jamie Gale	Star	~~16~~	1	5	9	5	15	6	5	2	~~16~~	9	—N/a					57	9
Daniel Slater; Nathan Handley	49er	~~14~~	9	~~18~~; ~~OCS~~	5	12	7	5	12	4	2	3	8	2	7	13	10	99	8

Mixed racing

Athlete	Event	Fleet racing								Match racing														
Athlete	Event	Race						Points	Rank	Round robin						Quarterfinal						Semifinal	Final / BM	
Athlete	Event	1	2	3	4	5	6	Points	Rank	Opposition Result	Opposition Result	Opposition Result	Opposition Result	Opposition Result	Rank	Opposition Result	Opposition Result	Opposition Result	Opposition Result	Opposition Result	Rank	Opposition Result	Opposition Result	Rank
Don Cowie; Rod Davis; Alan Smith	Soling	3	3	~~10~~	2	7	3	18	4 Q	Bye						DEN; L	GER; L	NED; L	NOR; W	RUS; W	5	Did not advance		

== Shooting ==
New Zealand was represented in shooting with five men and two women.

Men

Athlete	Event	Qualification		Final		Total	
Athlete	Event	Points	Rank	Points	Rank	Points	Rank
Victor Shaw	Trap	102	38	Did not advance			
Brant Woodward	Trap	105	37	Did not advance			
Des Coe	Double trap	118	25	Did not advance			
Geoffrey Jukes	Skeet	120	19	Did not advance			
Brian Thomson	Skeet	11	47	Did not advance			

Women

Athlete	Event	Qualification		Final		Total	
Athlete	Event	Points	Rank	Points	Rank	Points	Rank
Tania Corrigan	10 m air pistol	366	39	Did not advance			
Tania Corrigan	25 m pistol	563	37	Did not advance			
Teresa Borrell	10 m trap	58	15	Did not advance			

== Softball ==
=== Women's team competition ===
- Preliminary round robin

- Lost to Australia (2:3)
- Defeated Canada (3:2)
- Lost to PR China (0:10)
- Defeated Cuba (6:2)
- Lost to Italy (0:1)
- Lost to United States (0:2)
- Lost to Japan (1:2)

- Semifinals

- Did not advance → Sixth place

- Team roster

- Zavana Aranga
- Jaye Bailey
- Kim Dermott
- Rhonda Hira
- Melanie Hulme
- Lisa Kersten
- Ruta Lealamanu
- Cindy Potae
- Char Pouaka
- Kiri Shaw
- Jackie Smith
- Fiona Timu
- Helen Townsend
- Melisa Upu
- Gina Weber

== Swimming ==
Men

Athlete	Event	Heat		Semifinal		Final	
Athlete	Event	Result	Rank	Result	Rank	Result	Rank
Jonathan Duncan	200 m freestyle	1:53.27	32	did not advance			
Jonathan Duncan	400 m freestyle	3:58.52	29	—N/a		did not advance	
Jonathan Duncan	1500 m freestyle	16:03.41	37	—N/a		did not advance	
Steven Ferguson	100 m breaststroke	1:03.06	27	did not advance			
Steven Ferguson	200 m breaststroke	2:19.31	31	did not advance			
Dean Kent	200 m individual medley	2:04.07	23	did not advance			
Dean Kent	400 m individual medley	4:21.81	16	—N/a		did not advance	
Scott Talbot-Cameron	100 m backstroke	57.86	37	did not advance			
Scott Talbot-Cameron	200 m backstroke	2:01.53	22	did not advance			

Women

Athlete	Event	Heat		Semifinal		Final	
Athlete	Event	Result	Rank	Result	Rank	Result	Rank
Helen Norfolk	200 m backstroke	2:16.22	20	did not advance			
Helen Norfolk	200 m individual medley	2:18.90	20	did not advance			
Helen Norfolk	400 m individual medley	4:46.42 NR	13	—N/a		did not advance	
Vivienne Rignall	50 m freestyle	25.52 NR	=7 Q	25.61	=9	did not advance	
Monique Robins	100 m freestyle	57.85	33	did not advance			
Monique Robins	100 m backstroke	1:04.52	26	did not advance			
Elizabeth Van Welie	200 m butterfly	2:11.62 NR	16 Q	2:11.68	15	did not advance	

== Triathlon ==
New Zealand's heavily touted triathletes were unable to perform up to expectations in the inaugural Olympic triathlon. In particular, Hamish Carter, who had been considered likely to win the event, placed twenty-sixth.

Athlete	Event	Swim (1.5 km)	Trans 1	Bike (40 km)	Trans 2	Run (10 km)	Total Time	Rank
Ben Bright	Men's	17:51.60	23.39	58:49.90	21.90	34:50.47	1:52:17.26	38
Hamish Carter	Men's	17:24.19	24.00	59:16.30	20.80	33:31.88	1:50:57.17	26
Craig Watson	Men's	17:41.99	23.10	58:58.40	20.10	32:38.26	1:50:01.85	16
Evelyn Williamson	Women's	20:01.88	26.20	1:06:38.40	23.40	38:08.42	2:05:38.30	22

== Weightlifting ==
Athlete	Event	Snatch			Clean & Jerk			Total	Rank
Athlete	Event	1	2	3	1	2	3	Total	Rank
Nigel Avery	Men's + 105 kg	162.5	167.5	172.5	200.0	205.0	210.0	382.5	17
Olivia Baker	Women's + 75 kg	100.0	~~105.0~~	105.0	125.0	~~130.0~~	130.0	235.0	8
