= Basketball at the 2000 Summer Olympics – Men's team rosters =

This is a list of the players who were on the rosters of the teams who participated in the 2000 Summer Olympics for Men's Basketball.

== Group A ==
=== China ===
China men's national basketball team – 2000 Summer Olympics roster
Players
Coaches

Pos.	No.	Name	Age – Date of birth	Height	Club	Ctr.
G	6	Guo Shiqiang	25 – August 7, 1975	6 ft 4 in (1.93 m)	Liaoning Hunters	(China)
F	8	Hu Weidong	30 – January 3, 1970	6 ft 6 in (1.98 m)	Jiangsu Dragons	(China)
SF	10	Li Nan	23 – September 25, 1976	6 ft 6 in (1.98 m)	Bayi Rockets	(China)
G	4	Li Qun	26 – November 10, 1973	5 ft 10 in (1.78 m)
G	5	Li Xiaoyong	30 – November 28, 1969	6 ft 2 in (1.88 m)
G	11	Liu Yudong	30 – March 23, 1970	6 ft 7 in (2.01 m)	Bayi Rockets	(China)
C	11	Mengke Bateer	24 – November 20, 1975	6 ft 11 in (2.11 m)	Beijing Ducks	(China)
F	7	Sun Jun	31 – June 22, 1969	6 ft 6 in (1.98 m)	Jilin Northeast Tigers	(China)
PF	15	Wang Zhizhi	21 – July 8, 1979	7 ft 1 in (2.16 m)	Bayi Rockets	(China)
C	13	Yao Ming	20 – September 12, 1980	7 ft 5 in (2.26 m)	Shanghai Sharks	(China)
F	9	Zhang Jingsong	27 – September 2, 1973	6 ft 6 in (1.98 m)
F	12	Zheng Wu	33 – August 7, 1967	6 ft 6 in (1.98 m)

Head coach

- (China) Jiang Xingquan

Legend

- (C) Team captain
- nat field describes country
  of last club
  before the tournament
- Age as of September 17, 2000

=== France ===
France men's national basketball team – 2000 Summer Olympics roster
Players
Coaches

Pos.	No.	Name	Age – Date of birth	Height	Club	Ctr.
C	14	Jim Bilba	32 – April 13, 1968	6 ft 6 in (1.98 m)	ASVEL Basket	(France)
F	8	Yann Bonato	28 – March 4, 1972	6 ft 7 in (2.01 m)	CSP Limoges	(France)
F	9	Makan Dioumassi	28 – July 21, 1972	6 ft 5 in (1.96 m)	Le Mans Sarthe Basket	(France)
G/F	7	Laurent Foirest	26 – September 18, 1973	6 ft 6 in (1.98 m)	TAU Cerámica	(Spain)
C	11	Thierry Gadou	31 – January 13, 1969	6 ft 9 in (2.06 m)	Pau-Orthez	(France)
F/C	12	Cyril Julian	26 – March 29, 1974	6 ft 9 in (2.06 m)	Paris Basket Racing	(France)
C	13	Crawford Palmer	30 – September 14, 1970	6 ft 10 in (2.08 m)	Joventut Badalona	(Spain)
G	6	Antoine Rigaudeau	28 – December 17, 1971	6 ft 7 in (2.01 m)	Kinder Bologna	(Italy)
F	10	Stéphane Risacher	28 – August 26, 1972	6 ft 8 in (2.03 m)	Pau-Orthez	(France)
G	5	Laurent Sciarra	27 – August 8, 1973	6 ft 5 in (1.96 m)	Paris Basket Racing	(France)
G	4	Moustapha Sonko	28 – June 14, 1972	6 ft 4 in (1.93 m)	ASVEL Basket	(France)
C	15	Frédéric Weis	23 – June 22, 1977	7 ft 2 in (2.18 m)	CSP Limoges	(France)

Head coach

- (France) Jean-Pierre de Vincenzi

Legend

- (C) Team captain
- nat field describes country
  of last club
  before the tournament
- Age as of September 17, 2000

=== Italy ===
Italy men's national basketball team – 2000 Summer Olympics roster
Players
Coaches

Pos.	No.	Name	Age – Date of birth	Height	Club	Ctr.
G	12	Alessandro Abbio	29 – March 13, 1971	6 ft 4 in (1.93 m)	Kinder Bologna	(Italy)
SG	5	Gianluca Basile	25 – January 24, 1975	6 ft 4 in (1.93 m)	Paf Wennington Bologna	(Italy)
C	14	Roberto Chiacig	25 – December 1, 1974	6 ft 11 in (2.11 m)	RB Montecatini Terme	(Italy)
C	15	Damiao, Marcelo	25 – March 19, 1975	6 ft 8 in (2.03 m)	Pallacanestro Reggiana	(Italy)
F	7	Gregor Fučka	29 – August 7, 1971	7 ft 1 in (2.16 m)	Paf Wennington Bologna	(Italy)
F	6	Giacomo Galanda	25 – January 30, 1975	6 ft 11 in (2.11 m)	Paf Wennington Bologna	(Italy)
F	9	Li Vecchi, Agostino	29 – October 24, 1970	6 ft 8 in (2.03 m)	Ina Sicilia Barcellona	(Italy)
PF	8	Denis Marconato	25 – July 29, 1975	6 ft 11 in (2.11 m)	Benetton Treviso	(Italy)
G	11	Andrea Meneghin	26 – February 2, 1974	6 ft 7 in (2.01 m)	Varese Roosters	(Italy)
G	13	Michele Mian	27 – July 18, 1973	6 ft 4 in (1.93 m)	Scavolini Pesaro	(Italy)
G	10	Carlton Myers	29 – March 30, 1971	6 ft 4 in (1.93 m)	Paf Wennington Bologna	(Italy)
G	4	Scarone, German	25 – February 27, 1975	6 ft 2 in (1.88 m)	RB Montecatini Terme	(Italy)

Head coach

- (Montenegro) Bogdan Tanjević

Legend

- (C) Team captain
- nat field describes country
  of last club
  before the tournament
- Age as of September 17, 2000

=== Lithuania ===
Lithuania men's national basketball team – 2000 Summer Olympics roster
Players
Coaches

Pos.	No.	Name	Age – Date of birth	Height	Club	Ctr.
G	10	Dainius Adomaitis	26 – January 19, 1974	6 ft 8 in (2.03 m)	Anwil Włocławek	(Poland)
C	14	Gintaras Einikis	30 – September 30, 1969	6 ft 9 in (2.06 m)	CSKA Moscow	(Russia)
G	9	Andrius Giedraitis	27 – July 23, 1973	6 ft 5 in (1.96 m)	Lietuvos Rytas	(Lithuania)
PG	4	Šarūnas Jasikevičius	24 – March 5, 1976	6 ft 4 in (1.93 m)	Union Olimpija	(Slovenia)
G	5	Kęstutis Marčiulionis	23 – April 4, 1977	6 ft 2 in (1.88 m)	Delaware Blue Hens	(United States)
F	12	Tomas Masiulis	24 – September 19, 1975	6 ft 9 in (2.06 m)	Žalgiris Kaunas	(Lithuania)
G	13	Darius Maskoliūnas	29 – January 6, 1971	6 ft 5 in (1.96 m)	Asseco Prokom Gdynia	(Poland)
F	6	Mindaugas Timinskas	26 – March 28, 1974	6 ft 7 in (2.01 m)	Žalgiris Kaunas	(Lithuania)
G	8	Ramūnas Šiškauskas	22 – September 10, 1978	6 ft 6 in (1.98 m)	Lietuvos Rytas	(Lithuania)
F	7	Saulius Štombergas	26 – December 14, 1973	6 ft 8 in (2.03 m)	Kinder Bologna	(Italy)
F	15	Darius Songaila	22 – February 14, 1978	6 ft 8 in (2.03 m)	Wake Forest Demon Deacons	(United States)
C	11	Eurelijus Žukauskas	27 – August 22, 1973	7 ft 2 in (2.18 m)	Žalgiris Kaunas	(Lithuania)

Head coach

- (Lithuania) Jonas Kazlauskas

Legend

- (C) Team captain
- nat field describes country
  of last club
  before the tournament
- Age as of September 17, 2000

=== New Zealand ===
New Zealand men's national basketball team – 2000 Summer Olympics roster
Players
Coaches

Pos.	No.	Name	Age – Date of birth	Height	Club	Ctr.
SF	11	Pero Cameron	26 – June 5, 1974	6 ft 7 in (2.01 m)	Auckland Stars	(New Zealand)
G	12	Mark Dickel	23 – December 21, 1976	6 ft 2 in (1.88 m)	Victoria Titans	(Australia)
G	12	Paul Henare	21 – March 4, 1979	6 ft 0 in (1.83 m)	Auckland Stars	(New Zealand)
C	12	Robert Hickey	26 – January 12, 1974	6 ft 10 in (2.08 m)
SG	8	Phill Jones	26 – January 25, 1974	6 ft 6 in (1.98 m)	Nelson Giants	(New Zealand)
G	10	Ralph Lattimore	33 – June 23, 1967	6 ft 4 in (1.93 m)
F/C	4	Sean Marks	25 – August 23, 1975	6 ft 10 in (2.08 m)	Toronto Raptors	(Canada)
SG	6	Kirk Penney	19 – November 23, 1980	6 ft 5 in (1.96 m)	North Harbour Heat	(New Zealand)
C	13	Peter Pokai	35 – August 24, 1965	6 ft 6 in (1.98 m)
C	15	Tony Rampton	24 – May 30, 1976	7 ft 0 in (2.13 m)	Nelson Giants	(New Zealand)
G	9	Brad Riley	26 – July 2, 1974	6 ft 6 in (1.98 m)
G	5	Nenad Vučinić	35 – April 7, 1965	6 ft 4 in (1.93 m)	Nelson Giants	(New Zealand)

Head coach

- (New Zealand) Keith Mair

Legend

- (C) Team captain
- nat field describes country
  of last club
  before the tournament
- Age as of September 17, 2000

=== United States ===
United States men's national basketball team – 2000 Summer Olympics roster
Players
Coaches

Pos.	No.	Name	Age – Date of birth	Height	Club	Ctr.
F	15	Shareef Abdur-Rahim	23 – December 11, 1976	6 ft 9 in (2.06 m)	Vancouver Grizzlies	(Canada)
G	12	Ray Allen	25 – July 20, 1975	6 ft 5 in (1.96 m)	Milwaukee Bucks	(United States)
F	11	Vin Baker	28 – November 23, 1971	6 ft 11 in (2.11 m)	Seattle SuperSonics	(United States)
G	9	Vince Carter	23 – January 26, 1977	6 ft 6 in (1.98 m)	Toronto Raptors	(Canada)
F	10	Kevin Garnett	24 – May 19, 1976	6 ft 11 in (2.11 m)	Minnesota Timberwolves	(United States)
G	8	Tim Hardaway	34 – September 1, 1966	6 ft 0 in (1.83 m)	Miami Heat	(United States)
G	6	Allan Houston	29 – April 20, 1971	6 ft 5 in (1.96 m)	New York Knicks	(United States)
G	5	Jason Kidd (C)	27 – May 23, 1973	6 ft 4 in (1.93 m)	Phoenix Suns	(United States)
F	13	Antonio McDyess	26 – September 7, 1974	6 ft 9 in (2.06 m)	Denver Nuggets	(United States)
C	7	Alonzo Mourning (C)	30 – February 8, 1970	6 ft 10 in (2.08 m)	Miami Heat	(United States)
G	14	Gary Payton (C)	32 – July 23, 1968	6 ft 4 in (1.93 m)	Seattle SuperSonics	(United States)
G	4	Steve Smith	31 – March 31, 1969	6 ft 7 in (2.01 m)	Portland Trail Blazers	(United States)

Head coach

- (United States) Rudy Tomjanovich

Assistant coach(es)

- (United States) Larry Brown
- (United States) Gene Keady
- (United States) Tubby Smith

Legend

- (C) Team captain
- Club – describes last
  club before the tournament
- Age – describes age
  on September 15, 2000

Roster

== Group B ==
=== Angola ===
Angola men's national basketball team – 2000 Summer Olympics roster
Players
Coaches

Pos.	No.	Name	Age – Date of birth	Height	Club	Ctr.
SG	13	Carlos Almeida	23 – September 24, 1976	6 ft 4 in (1.93 m)	Primeiro de Agosto	(Angola)
F	9	Víctor de Carvalho	31 – February 20, 1969	6 ft 4 in (1.93 m)	Petróleos Luanda	(Angola)
F	11	Chipongue, Belarmino	25 – September 22, 1974	6 ft 5 in (1.96 m)	Petróleos Luanda	(Angola)
F	10	Herlander Coimbra	32 – June 16, 1968	6 ft 7 in (2.01 m)	Primeiro de Agosto	(Angola)
PF	12	David Dias	31 – April 21, 1969	6 ft 6 in (1.98 m)	Benfica	(Portugal)
G	7	Garcia Domingos	29 – May 12, 1971	6 ft 4 in (1.93 m)	Primeiro de Agosto	(Angola)
C	15	Buila Katiavala	29 – May 13, 1971	6 ft 9 in (2.06 m)	Primeiro de Agosto	(Angola)
PG	14	Miguel Lutonda	28 – December 24, 1971	6 ft 1 in (1.85 m)	Primeiro de Agosto	(Angola)
F	5	Aníbal Moreira	33 – September 19, 1966	6 ft 4 in (1.93 m)	Queluz	(Portugal)
PF	4	Victor Muzadi	22 – June 22, 1978	6 ft 7 in (2.01 m)	Primeiro de Agosto	(Angola)
F	6	Angelo Victoriano	32 – February 8, 1968	6 ft 5 in (1.96 m)	Primeiro de Agosto	(Angola)
F	8	Edmar Victoriano	24 – November 10, 1975	6 ft 5 in (1.96 m)	Primeiro de Agosto	(Angola)

Head coach

- (Portugal) Mário Palma

Legend

- (C) Team captain
- nat field describes country
  of last club
  before the tournament
- Age as of September 17, 2000

=== Australia ===
Australia men's national basketball team – 2000 Summer Olympics roster
Players
Coaches

Pos.	No.	Name	Age – Date of birth	Height	Club	Ctr.
C	9	Chris Anstey	25 – January 1, 1975	7 ft 0 in (2.13 m)	Victoria Titans	(Australia)
C	12	Mark Bradtke	31 – September 27, 1968	6 ft 10 in (2.08 m)	Melbourne Tigers	(Australia)
F	7	Martin Cattalini	26 – October 4, 1973	6 ft 7 in (2.01 m)	Adelaide 36ers	(Australia)
G	10	Andrew Gaze (C)	35 – July 24, 1965	6 ft 7 in (2.01 m)	Melbourne Tigers	(Australia)
G	8	Ricky Grace	34 – August 20, 1966	6 ft 1 in (1.85 m)	Perth Wildcats	(Australia)
PG	11	Shane Heal	30 – September 6, 1970	6 ft 0 in (1.83 m)	Sydney Kings	(Australia)
C	13	Luc Longley	31 – January 19, 1969	7 ft 3 in (2.21 m)	Phoenix Suns	(United States)
G/F	6	Sam Mackinnon	24 – August 25, 1976	6 ft 6 in (1.98 m)	Townsville Crocodiles	(Australia)
G	5	Brett Maher	27 – April 17, 1973	6 ft 2 in (1.88 m)	Adelaide 36ers	(Australia)
C	15	Paul Rogers	26 – September 29, 1973	6 ft 10 in (2.08 m)	Perth Wildcats	(Australia)
G/F	4	Jason Smith	25 – October 20, 1974	6 ft 4 in (1.93 m)	Victoria Titans	(Australia)
F	14	Andrew Vlahov	31 – April 1, 1969	6 ft 7 in (2.01 m)	Perth Wildcats	(Australia)

Head coach

- (Australia) Barry Barnes

Legend

- (C) Team captain
- nat field describes country
  of last club
  before the tournament
- Age as of September 17, 2000

=== Canada ===
Canada men's national basketball team – 2000 Summer Olympics roster
Players
Coaches

Pos.	No.	Name	Age – Date of birth	Height	Club	Ctr.
F	9	Rowan Barrett	27 – November 24, 1972	6 ft 6 in (1.98 m)	Cocodrilos de Caracas	(Venezuela)
PG	4	David Daniels	29 – April 2, 1971	5 ft 10 in (1.78 m)	KK MZT Skopje	(North Macedonia)
G	10	Greg Francis	26 – April 4, 1974	6 ft 3 in (1.91 m)	Cheshire Jets	(United Kingdom)
F	13	Peter Guarasci	26 – February 25, 1974	6 ft 9 in (2.06 m)	Skyliners Frankfurt	(Germany)
G	5	Sherman Hamilton	28 – April 23, 1972	6 ft 1 in (1.85 m)	Belgrano de San Nicolás	(Argentina)
F	12	Eric Hinrichsen	24 – April 13, 1976	6 ft 6 in (1.98 m)	Bree BBC	(Belgium)
C	11	Todd MacCulloch	24 – January 27, 1976	7 ft 0 in (2.13 m)	Philadelphia 76ers	(United States)
F	6	Andrew Mavis	24 – September 9, 1976	6 ft 6 in (1.98 m)	Newcastle Eagles	(United Kingdom)
F	14	Michael Meeks	28 – February 23, 1972	6 ft 9 in (2.06 m)	Besançon BCD	(France)
PG	7	Steve Nash	26 – February 7, 1974	6 ft 3 in (1.91 m)	Dallas Mavericks	(United States)
F	15	Greg Newton	26 – September 8, 1974	6 ft 11 in (2.11 m)	Flamengo Basketball	(Brazil)
G	8	Shawn Swords	26 – December 27, 1973	6 ft 4 in (1.93 m)	Basket-club Boncourt	(Switzerland)

Head coach

- (Canada) Jay Triano

Legend

- (C) Team captain
- nat field describes country
  of last club
  before the tournament
- Age as of September 17, 2000

=== Russia ===
Russia men's national basketball team – 2000 Summer Olympics roster
Players
Coaches

Pos.	No.	Name	Age – Date of birth	Height	Club	Ctr.
F	15	Ruslan Avleev	24 – June 4, 1976	6 ft 7 in (2.01 m)	UNICS Kazan	(Russia)
C	6	Aleksandr Bašminov	22 – May 7, 1978	6 ft 11 in (2.11 m)	Ural Great Perm	(Russia)
G	9	Sergei Bazarevich	35 – March 16, 1965	6 ft 3 in (1.91 m)	PAOK B.C.	(Greece)
F	12	Andrei Fetisov	28 – January 19, 1972	6 ft 10 in (2.08 m)	Spartak St. Petersburg	(Russia)
F	13	Andrei Kirilenko	19 – February 18, 1981	6 ft 9 in (2.06 m)	CSKA Moscow	(Russia)
F	7	Yevgeny Kisurin	31 – January 28, 1969	6 ft 9 in (2.06 m)	Varese Roosters	(Italy)
G	5	Valentin Kubrakov	28 – July 25, 1972	6 ft 5 in (1.96 m)	Lokomotiv Vody	(Russia)
F/C	8	Nikita Morgunov	25 – June 29, 1975	6 ft 11 in (2.11 m)	CSKA Moscow	(Russia)
G	10	Evgeniy Pashutin	31 – February 6, 1969	6 ft 3 in (1.91 m)	Maccabi Ra'anana	(Israel)
SG	11	Zakhar Pashutin	26 – May 3, 1974	6 ft 5 in (1.96 m)	Pınar Karşıyaka	(Turkey)
F	14	Sergei Panov	30 – June 30, 1970	6 ft 8 in (2.03 m)	CSKA Moscow	(Russia)
G	4	Sergei Chikalkin	24 – December 11, 1975	6 ft 5 in (1.96 m)	PBC Ural Great	(Russia)

Head coach

- (Russia) Stanislav Yeryomin

Legend

- (C) Team captain
- nat field describes country
  of last club
  before the tournament
- Age as of September 17, 2000

=== Spain ===
Spain men's national basketball team – 2000 Summer Olympics roster
Players
Coaches

Pos.	No.	Name	Age – Date of birth	Height	Club	Ctr.
G	4	Alberto Angulo	30 – June 19, 1970	6 ft 4 in (1.93 m)	Real Madrid	(Spain)
C	13	Iñaki de Miguel	26 – October 24, 1973	6 ft 9 in (2.06 m)	Olympiacos	(Greece)
G	10	Rodrigo De la Fuente	23 – November 26, 1976	6 ft 7 in (2.01 m)	FC Barcelona	(Spain)
C	15	Roberto Dueñas	24 – November 1, 1975	7 ft 3 in (2.21 m)	FC Barcelona	(Spain)
SF	7	Jorge Garbajosa	22 – December 19, 1977	6 ft 9 in (2.06 m)	TAU Cerámica	(Spain)
G	11	Alberto Herreros	31 – April 20, 1969	6 ft 7 in (2.01 m)	Real Madrid	(Spain)
F	9	Carlos Jiménez	24 – February 10, 1976	6 ft 9 in (2.06 m)	Estudiantes	(Spain)
PG	5	Juan Carlos Navarro	20 – June 13, 1980	6 ft 4 in (1.93 m)	FC Barcelona	(Spain)
C	14	Alfonso Reyes	28 – September 19, 1971	6 ft 8 in (2.03 m)	Estudiantes	(Spain)
G	8	Ignacio Rodríguez	30 – September 2, 1970	6 ft 2 in (1.88 m)	FC Barcelona	(Spain)
G	12	Johnny Rogers	36 – December 30, 1963	6 ft 10 in (2.08 m)	Panathinaikos	(Greece)
PG	6	Raül López	20 – April 15, 1980	6 ft 1 in (1.85 m)	Joventut Badalona	(Spain)

Head coach

- (Spain) Lolo Sainz

Legend

- (C) Team captain
- nat field describes country
  of last club
  before the tournament
- Age as of September 17, 2000

=== FR Yugoslavia ===
FR Yugoslavia men's national basketball team – 2000 Summer Olympics roster
Players
Coaches

Pos.	No.	Name	Age – Date of birth	Height	Club	Ctr.
G	4	Dejan Bodiroga	27 – March 2, 1973	6 ft 8 in (2.03 m)	Panathinaikos	(Greece)
G	5	Predrag Danilović	30 – February 26, 1970	6 ft 8 in (2.03 m)	Kinder Bologna	(Italy)
F	13	Predrag Drobnjak	24 – October 27, 1975	6 ft 11 in (2.11 m)	Efes Pilsen	(Turkey)
C	15	Nikola Jestratijević	24 – July 9, 1976	6 ft 11 in (2.11 m)	Crvena zvezda	(Serbia and Montenegro)
G	10	Dragan Lukovski	25 – March 21, 1975	6 ft 2 in (1.88 m)	Crvena zvezda	(Serbia and Montenegro)
G	6	Saša Obradović	31 – January 29, 1969	6 ft 5 in (1.96 m)	Crvena zvezda	(Serbia and Montenegro)
PG	7	Igor Rakočević	22 – March 29, 1978	6 ft 4 in (1.93 m)	Crvena zvezda	(Serbia and Montenegro)
C	11	Željko Rebrača	28 – April 9, 1972	6 ft 11 in (2.11 m)	Panathinaikos	(Greece)
G	9	Vlado Šćepanović	24 – November 13, 1975	6 ft 5 in (1.96 m)	Efes Pilsen	(Turkey)
F	8	Predrag Stojaković	23 – June 9, 1977	6 ft 9 in (2.06 m)	Sacramento Kings	(United States)
C	12	Dragan Tarlać	27 – May 9, 1973	6 ft 11 in (2.11 m)	Olympiacos	(Greece)
C	14	Dejan Tomašević	27 – May 6, 1973	6 ft 10 in (2.08 m)	Budućnost Podgorica	(Serbia and Montenegro)

Head coach

- (Federal Republic of Yugoslavia) Željko Obradović

Legend

- (C) Team captain
- nat field describes country
  of last club
  before the tournament
- Age as of September 17, 2000
