= Li Qun =

Li Qun may refer to:

- Li Qun (artist) (1912–2012), Chinese artist
- Li Qun (politician) (born 1962), Chinese politician
- Li Qun (basketball) (born 1973), Chinese basketball coach
