= 2002 FIBA World Championship squads =

The 2002 FIBA World Championship squads were the squads of the 2002 FIBA World Championship. The list includes the 12-men rosters of the 16 participating countries, totaling 192 players.

== Group A ==
=== Angola ===
Angola men's national basketball team roster
Players
Coaches

Pos.	No.	Name	Age – Date of birth	Height	Club	Ctr.
PF	4	Victor Muzadi	? – 22 June 1978	2.01 m (6 ft 7 in)	Primeiro de Agosto	(Angola)
PG	5	Walter Costa	? – 25 March 1973	1.85 m (6 ft 1 in)	Primeiro de Agosto	(Angola)
SF	6	Angelo Victoriano	34 – 8 February 1968	1.96 m (6 ft 5 in)	Primeiro de Agosto	(Angola)
SF	7	Gerson Monteiro	29 – 12 July 1973	1.90 m (6 ft 3 in)	Barreirense	(Portugal)
PF	8	Edmar Victoriano	26 – 1 November 1975	1.95 m (6 ft 5 in)	Primeiro de Agosto	(Angola)
SG	9	Victor de Carvalho	33 – 20 February 1969	1.93 m (6 ft 4 in)	Petro Atletico	(Angola)
C	10	Joaquim Gomes	21 – 23 December 1980	2.02 m (6 ft 8 in)	Valparaiso Crusaders	(United States)
PF	11	Mario Belarmino	27 – 22 September 1974	1.96 m (6 ft 5 in)	Petro Atletico	(Angola)
SG	12	Afonso Silva	28 – 24 July 1974	1.90 m (6 ft 3 in)	Primeiro de Agosto	(Angola)
SG	13	Carlos Almeida	25 – 24 September 1976	1.93 m (6 ft 4 in)	Primeiro de Agosto	(Angola)
PG	14	Miguel Lutonda	30 – 24 December 1971	1.86 m (6 ft 1 in)	Primeiro de Agosto	(Angola)
PF	15	Eduardo Mingas	23 – 29 January 1979	1.98 m (6 ft 6 in)	Interclube	(Angola)

Head coach

- (Angola) Mario Palma

Legend

- (C) Team captain
- *Club field describes country of last club before the tournament
  - Age – describes age
    on 29 August 2002
- Injured

=== Canada ===
Canada men's national basketball team roster
Players
Coaches

Pos.	No.	Name	Age – Date of birth	Height	Club	Ctr.
PG	4	Novell Thomas	26 – 17 December 1975	1.83 m (6 ft 0 in)	Saskatchewan Hawks	(Canada)
PG	5	Sherman Hamilton	30 – 23 April 1972	1.85 m (6 ft 1 in)	BC Zalgiris	(Lithuania)
PG	6	Titus Channer	29 – 4 February 1973	1.88 m (6 ft 2 in)	Basket-club Boncourt	(Switzerland)
SG	7	Prosper Karangwa	24 – 17 May 1978	2.00 m (6 ft 7 in)	Siena Saints	(United States)
SG	8	Shawn Swords	28 – 27 December 1973	1.93 m (6 ft 4 in)	Euro Nokia Roseto	(Italy)
SF	9	Rowan Barrett	29 – 24 November 1972	1.97 m (6 ft 6 in)	Maccabi Rishon LeZion	(Israel)
SF	10	Greg Meldrum	29 – 1 June 1973	2.00 m (6 ft 7 in)	Thames Valley Tigers	(United Kingdom)
SF	11	Dave Thomas	25 – 4 December 1976	2.03 m (6 ft 8 in)	Canberra Cannons	(Australia)
SF	12	Steve Ross	21 – 11 October 1980	2.01 m (6 ft 7 in)	Santa Clara	(United States)
SF	13	Richard Elias Anderson	24 – 30 November 1977	1.98 m (6 ft 6 in)	Mattersburg 49ers	(Austria)
PF	14	Michael Meeks	30 – 23 February 1972	2.05 m (6 ft 9 in)	Fabriano Basket	(Italy)
C	15	Kevin Jobity	27 – 21 November 1974	2.08 m (6 ft 10 in)	Anibal Zahle	(Lebanon)

Head coach

- (Canada) Jay Triano

Legend

- (C) Team captain
- *Club field describes country of last club before the tournament
  - Age – describes age
    on 29 August 2002
- Injured

=== Spain ===
Spain men's national basketball team roster
Players
Coaches

Pos.	No.	Name	Age – Date of birth	Height	Club	Ctr.
F	4	Pau Gasol	22 – 6 July 1980	2.13 m (7 ft 0 in)	Memphis Grizzlies	(United States)
C	5	Oriol Junyent	26 – 1 July 1976	2.07 m (6 ft 9 in)	CB Granada	(Spain)
G	6	Carles Marco	27 – 23 September 1974	1.80 m (5 ft 11 in)	CB Valladolid	(Spain)
G	7	Juan Carlos Navarro	22 – 13 June 1980	1.93 m (6 ft 4 in)	FC Barcelona Bàsquet	(Spain)
G	8	Ignacio Rodríguez	31 – 2 September 1970	1.88 m (6 ft 2 in)	FC Barcelona Bàsquet	(Spain)
F	9	Felipe Reyes	22 – 16 March 1980	2.03 m (6 ft 8 in)	Adecco Estudiantes	(Spain)
F	10	Carlos Jiménez	26 – 10 February 1976	2.05 m (6 ft 9 in)	Adecco Estudiantes	(Spain)
F	11	Lucio Angulo	29 – 9 April 1973	2.00 m (6 ft 7 in)	Real Madrid Baloncesto	(Spain)
F	12	José Antonio Paraíso	31 – 20 April 1971	2.03 m (6 ft 8 in)	Baloncesto Fuenlabrada	(Spain)
G	13	José Manuel Calderón	20 – 28 September 1981	1.91 m (6 ft 3 in)	Pamesa Valencia	(Spain)
C	14	Alfonso Reyes	30 – 19 September 1971	2.02 m (6 ft 8 in)	Adecco Estudiantes	(Spain)
F	15	Jorge Garbajosa	24 – 19 December 1977	2.07 m (6 ft 9 in)	Benetton Treviso	(Italy)

Head coach

- (Spain) Javier Imbroda

Legend

- (C) Team captain
- *Club field describes country of last club before the tournament
  - Age – describes age
    on 13 August 2002
- Injured

=== FR Yugoslavia ===
FR Yugoslavia men's national basketball team roster
Players
Coaches

Pos.	No.	Name	Age – Date of birth	Height	Club	Ctr.
G	4	Dejan Bodiroga (C)	29 – 2 March 1973	2.03 m (6 ft 8 in)	Panathinaikos	(Greece)
C	5	Dejan Koturović	30 – 28 July 1972	2.13 m (7 ft 0 in)	Bologna	(Italy)
C	6	Žarko Čabarkapa	21 – 21 May 1981	2.11 m (6 ft 11 in)	Budućnost	(Serbia and Montenegro)
G	7	Igor Rakočević	24 – 29 March 1978	1.94 m (6 ft 4 in)	Minnesota Timberwolves	(United States)
F	8	Predrag Stojaković	25 – 9 June 1977	2.08 m (6 ft 10 in)	Sacramento Kings	(United States)
G	9	Vladimir Radmanović	21 – 13 November 1980	2.08 m (6 ft 10 in)	Seattle SuperSonics	(United States)
G	10	Marko Jarić	23 – 24 November 1978	2.01 m (6 ft 7 in)	Los Angeles Clippers	(United States)
F	11	Predrag Drobnjak	26 – 27 October 1975	2.11 m (6 ft 11 in)	Seattle SuperSonics	(United States)
C	12	Vlade Divac	34 – 25 July 1968	2.16 m (7 ft 1 in)	Sacramento Kings	(United States)
G	13	Miloš Vujanić	21 – 13 November 1980	1.92 m (6 ft 4 in)	Partizan	(Serbia and Montenegro)
C	14	Dejan Tomašević	29 – 6 May 1973	2.08 m (6 ft 10 in)	TAU Ceramica	(Spain)
F	15	Milan Gurović	27 – 15 November 1976	2.08 m (6 ft 10 in)	Unicaja	(Spain)

Head coach

- (Serbia and Montenegro) Svetislav Pešić

Assistant coach(es)

- (Serbia and Montenegro) Stevan Karadžić
- (Serbia and Montenegro) Aleksandar Petrović

Legend

- (C) Team captain
- *nat field describes country
  of last club
  before the tournament
  - Age as of August 13, 2002
- Injured

== Group B ==
=== Brazil ===
Brazil men's national basketball team roster
Players
Coaches

Pos.	No.	Name	Age – Date of birth	Height	Club	Ctr.
SG	4	Marcelo Machado	27 – April 12, 1975	2.00 m (6 ft 7 in)	Rimini Crabs	(Italy)
SF	5	Alex Garcia	22 – 4 March 1980	1.90 m (6 ft 3 in)	COC Ribeirao Preto	(Brazil)
SF	6	Vanderlei Mazzuchini	29 – 24 September 1972	1.99 m (6 ft 6 in)	Tilibra\Bauru	(Brazil)
C	7	Tiago Splitter	17 – January 1, 1985	2.11 m (6 ft 11 in)	Tau Ceramica	(Spain)
C	8	Sandro Varejão	30 – 9 April 1972	2.10 m (6 ft 11 in)	Vasco da Gama	(Brazil)
SG	9	Demetrius Ferracciu	29 – 17 July 1973	1.93 m (6 ft 4 in)	Minas	(Brazil)
PG	10	Helio Rubens Garcia Filho	27 – 12 May 1975	1.86 m (6 ft 1 in)	Franca São Paulo	(Brazil)
C	11	Anderson Varejão	19 – 28 September 1982	2.11 m (6 ft 11 in)	Barcelona	(Spain)
PF	12	Guilherme Giovannoni	22 – 2 June 1980	2.04 m (6 ft 8 in)	COC Ribeirao Preto	(Brazil)
SG	13	Leandro Barbosa	19 – 28 November 1982	1.94 m (6 ft 4 in)	Tilibra\Bauru	(Brazil)
SF	14	Rogério Klafke	31 – 26 March 1971	2.01 m (6 ft 7 in)	Vasco da Gama	(Brazil)
C	15	Rafael Araujo	22 – 12 August 1980	2.12 m (6 ft 11 in)	BYU	(United States)

Head coach

- (Brazil) Helio Rubens Garcia

Legend

- (C) Team captain
- *Club field describes country of last club before the tournament
  - Age – describes age
    on 29 August 2002
- Injured

=== Lebanon ===
Lebanon men's national basketball team roster
Players
Coaches

Pos.	No.	Name	Age – Date of birth	Height	Club	Ctr.
G	4	Walid Doumiati	34 – 16 July 1968	1.79 m (5 ft 10 in)	[[Al Riyadi]]	(Lebanon)
SG	5	Charles Bardawil	22 – 2 January 1980	1.91 m (6 ft 3 in)	Hekmeh BC	(Lebanon)
SG	6	Bader Makki	31 – 27 October 1970	1.88 m (6 ft 2 in)	Hekmeh BC	(Lebanon)
PG	7	Rony Fahed	20 – 6 November 1981	1.83 m (6 ft 0 in)	[[Blue Stars]]	(Lebanon)
PG	8	George Chibani	28 – 1 July 1974	1.79 m (5 ft 10 in)	[[Al Riyadi]]	(Lebanon)
SF	9	Yasser El-Hajj	32 – 18 August 1970	1.98 m (6 ft 6 in)	[[Al Riyadi]]	(Lebanon)
C	10	Roy Samaha	17 – 12 September 1984	2.05 m (6 ft 9 in)	Hekmeh BC	(Lebanon)
C	11	Paul Afeaki Khoury	34 – 27 April 1968	2.07 m (6 ft 9 in)	[[Al Riyadi]]	(Lebanon)
SF	12	Ghazi El Boustani	34 – 3 October 1967	1.88 m (6 ft 2 in)	[[Al Riyadi]]	(Lebanon)
SG	13	Elie Mechantaf	31 – 5 October 1970	1.95 m (6 ft 5 in)	Hekmeh BC	(Lebanon)
C	14	Joe Vogel	28 – 15 September 1973	2.11 m (6 ft 11 in)	[[Champville]]	(Lebanon)
SF	15	Fadi El Khatib	23 – 1 January 1979	1.98 m (6 ft 6 in)	Hekmeh BC	(Lebanon)

Head coach

- (United States) John Neumann

Legend

- (C) Team captain
- *Club field describes country of last club before the tournament
  - Age – describes age
    on 29 August 2002
- Injured

=== Puerto Rico ===
- José Ortiz
- Rick Apodaca
- Luis Ruiz
- Carlos Arroyo
- Christian Dalmau
- Elías Larry Ayuso
- Antonio Latimer
- Rolando Hourruitiner
- Félix Javier Pérez
- Richie Dalmau
- Daniel Santiago
- Jerome Mincy

coach: ?

=== Turkey ===
Turkey men's national basketball team roster
Players
Coaches

Pos.	No.	Name	Age – Date of birth	Height	Club	Ctr.
G	4	Kerem Tunçeri	23 – 14 April 1979	1.87 m (6 ft 2 in)	Efes Pilsen	(Turkey)
F	5	Hidayet Türkoğlu	23 – 19 March 1979	2.08 m (6 ft 10 in)	Sacramento Kings	(United States)
F	6	Mirsad Türkcan	26 – 7 June 1976	2.06 m (6 ft 9 in)	CSKA Moscow	(Russia)
G	7	Hakan Köseoğlu	20 – 12 December 1981	1.88 m (6 ft 2 in)	Darüşşafaka	(Turkey)
C	8	Asım Pars	26 – 1 April 1976	2.11 m (6 ft 11 in)	Ülkerspor	(Turkey)
F	9	Harun Erdenay (C)	34 – 27 May 1968	1.93 m (6 ft 4 in)	Ülkerspor	(Turkey)
G	10	İbrahim Kutluay	28 – 7 January 1974	1.98 m (6 ft 6 in)	Panathinaikos	(Greece)
F	11	Kaya Peker	22 – 2 August 1980	2.08 m (6 ft 10 in)	Efes Pilsen	(Turkey)
C	12	Hüseyin Beşok	27 – 2 August 1975	2.11 m (6 ft 11 in)	Maccabi Tel Aviv	(Israel)
C	13	Mehmet Okur	23 – 26 May 1979	2.11 m (6 ft 11 in)	Detroit Pistons	(United States)
F	14	Haluk Yıldırım	30 – 25 June 1972	2.01 m (6 ft 7 in)	Ülkerspor	(Turkey)
G	15	Ömer Onan	24 – 2 April 1978	1.91 m (6 ft 3 in)	Efes Pilsen	(Turkey)

Head coach

- (Turkey) Aydın Örs

Legend

- (C) Team captain
- *Club field describes country
  of last club
  before the tournament
  - Age as of August 13, 2002
- Injured

== Group C ==
=== Algeria ===
Algeria men's national basketball team roster
Players
Coaches

Pos.	No.	Name	Age – Date of birth	Height	Club	Ctr.
G	4	Sofiane Boulahia	29 – 20 March 1973	1.80 m (5 ft 11 in)	Unknown club
G	5	Samir Mehenaoui	38 – 21 August 1964	1.98 m (6 ft 6 in)	Unknown club
G	6	Farid Belhimeur	18 – 8 May 1984	1.82 m (6 ft 0 in)	Unknown club
G	7	Nabil Mebarki	23 – 8 July 1979	1.94 m (6 ft 4 in)	Unknown club
F	8	Nabil El Bekeye Boudissa	21 – 12 July 1981	2.02 m (6 ft 8 in)	Unknown club
G	9	Miloud Doubal	20 – 2 December 1981	1.87 m (6 ft 2 in)	Olympique Antibes	(France)
C	10	Nasser Ramdane Haif	25 – 9 August 1977	2.04 m (6 ft 8 in)	Unknown club
F	11	Nadjim Ouali	31 – 28 February 1971	2.04 m (6 ft 8 in)	Unknown club
F	12	Moured Boughedir	25 – 1 October 1976	1.98 m (6 ft 6 in)	Unknown club
G	13	Amine Benramdane	29 – 27 April 1973	1.90 m (6 ft 3 in)	Unknown club
G	14	Abdelhalim Sayah	27 – 23 August 1975	2.00 m (6 ft 7 in)	Unknown club
C	15	Tarek Oukid	22 – 13 December 1979	2.05 m (6 ft 9 in)	Unknown club

Head coach

- (Algeria) Faid Bilal

Legend

- (C) Team captain
- *Club field describes country of last club before the tournament
  - Age – describes age
    on 29 August 2002
- Injured

=== China ===
China men's national basketball team roster
Players
Coaches

Pos.	No.	Name	Age – Date of birth	Height	Club	Ctr.
PG	4	Guo Shiqiang	27 – 8 July 1975	1.92 m (6 ft 4 in)	Liaoning Hunters	(China)
PG	5	Liu Wei	22 – 15 January 1980	1.89 m (6 ft 2 in)	Shanghai Sharks	(China)
PF	6	Gong Xiaobin	32 – 23 November 1969	2.02 m (6 ft 8 in)	Shandong Flaming Bulls	(China)
SG	7	Zhang Cheng	24 – 1 August 1978	1.96 m (6 ft 5 in)	Jiangsu Dragons	(China)
SG	8	Hu Weidong	32 – 3 January 1970	1.98 m (6 ft 6 in)	Jiangsu Dragons	(China)
SF	9	Chen Ke	23 – 16 May 1979	2.04 m (6 ft 8 in)	Bayi Rockets	(China)
G/F	10	Li Nan	25 – 25 September 1976	1.98 m (6 ft 6 in)	Bayi Rockets	(China)
PF	11	Liu Yudong	32 – 23 March 1970	2.00 m (6 ft 7 in)	Bayi Rockets	(China)
SF	12	Zhu Fangyu	19 – 5 January 1983	2.00 m (6 ft 7 in)	Guangdong Southern Tigers	(China)
C	13	Yao Ming	21 – 12 September 1980	2.29 m (7 ft 6 in)	Houston Rockets	(United States)
C	14	Mengke Bateer	26 – 20 November 1975	2.10 m (6 ft 11 in)	Denver Nuggets	(United States)
PF	15	Du Feng	21 – 30 July 1981	2.02 m (6 ft 8 in)	Guangdong Southern Tigers	(China)

Head coach

- (China) Wang Fei

Legend

- (C) Team captain
- *Club field describes country of last club before the tournament
  - Age – describes age
    on 29 August 2002
- Injured

=== Germany ===
Germany men's national basketball team roster
Players
Coaches

Pos.	No.	Name	Age – Date of birth	Height	Club	Ctr.
G	4	Mithat Demirel	24 – 10 May 1978	1.81 m (5 ft 11 in)	Alba Berlin	(Germany)
F	5	Ademola Okulaja	27 – 10 July 1975	2.03 m (6 ft 8 in)	FC Barcelona	(Spain)
F	6	Jörg Lütcke	26 – 12 December 1975	2.00 m (6 ft 7 in)	Alba Berlin	(Germany)
G	7	Marko Pešić	25 – 6 December 1976	1.97 m (6 ft 6 in)	Alba Berlin	(Germany)
G	8	Pascal Roller	25 – 20 November 1976	1.80 m (5 ft 11 in)	Opel Skyliners Frankfurt	(Germany)
G	9	Henrik Rödl	33 – 4 March 1969	2.00 m (6 ft 7 in)	Alba Berlin	(Germany)
G	10	Misan Nikagbatse	20 – 7 July 1982	1.93 m (6 ft 4 in)	Olympiacos	(Greece)
G	11	Stefano Garris	23 – 21 April 1979	1.99 m (6 ft 6 in)	Alba Berlin	(Germany)
C	12	Stephen Arigbabu	30 – 15 February 1972	2.06 m (6 ft 9 in)	RheinEnergie Köln	(Germany)
C	13	Patrick Femerling	27 – 4 March 1975	2.15 m (7 ft 1 in)	FC Barcelona	(Spain)
F	14	Dirk Nowitzki	24 – 19 June 1978	2.13 m (7 ft 0 in)	Dallas Mavericks	(United States)
C	15	Robert Maras	21 – 25 June 1981	2.13 m (7 ft 0 in)	Opel Skyliners Frankfurt	(Germany)

Head coach

- (Finland) Henrik Dettmann

Legend

- (C) Team captain
- *Club field describes current pro club
  - nat field describes country
    of last club
    before the tournament
  - Age field is age on August 13, 2002
- Injured

=== United States ===
United States men's national basketball team roster
Players
Coaches

Pos.	No.	Name	Age – Date of birth	Height	Club	Ctr.
G	4	Michael Finley	29 – 6 March 1973	2.01 m (6 ft 7 in)	Dallas Mavericks	(United States)
G	5	Baron Davis	23 – 13 April 1979	1.91 m (6 ft 3 in)	New Orleans Hornets	(United States)
G	6	Andre Miller	26 – 19 March 1976	1.88 m (6 ft 2 in)	Los Angeles Clippers	(United States)
F	7	Jermaine O'Neal	23 – 13 October 1978	2.11 m (6 ft 11 in)	Indiana Pacers	(United States)
F	8	Antonio Davis	33 – 31 October 1968	2.06 m (6 ft 9 in)	Toronto Raptors	(Canada)
F	9	Paul Pierce	24 – 13 October 1977	2.01 m (6 ft 7 in)	Boston Celtics	(United States)
G	10	Reggie Miller	36 – 24 August 1965	2.01 m (6 ft 7 in)	Indiana Pacers	(United States)
F	11	Shawn Marion	24 – 7 May 1978	2.01 m (6 ft 7 in)	Phoenix Suns	(United States)
G	12	Jay Williams	20 – 10 September 1981	1.89 m (6 ft 2 in)	Chicago Bulls	(United States)
C	13	Ben Wallace	27 – 10 September 1974	2.02 m (6 ft 8 in)	Detroit Pistons	(United States)
F	14	Elton Brand	23 – 11 March 1979	2.06 m (6 ft 9 in)	Los Angeles Clippers	(United States)
C	15	Raef LaFrentz	26 – 29 May 1976	2.11 m (6 ft 11 in)	Denver Nuggets	(United States)

Head coach

- (United States) George Karl

Legend

- (C) Team captain
- *nat field describes country
  of last club
  before the tournament
  - Age as of August 13, 2002
- Injured

== Group D ==
=== Argentina ===
Argentina men's national basketball team roster
Players
Coaches

Pos.	No.	Name	Age – Date of birth	Height	Club	Ctr.
PG	4	Juan Ignacio Sánchez	25 – 8 May 1977	1.92 m (6 ft 4 in)	Panathinaikos	(Greece)
SG	5	Manu Ginóbili	25 – 28 July 1977	1.98 m (6 ft 6 in)	Kinder Bologna	(Italy)
PG	6	Alejandro Montecchia	30 – 1 January 1972	1.82 m (6 ft 0 in)	Viola Reggio	(Italy)
C	7	Fabricio Oberto	27 – 21 March 1975	2.08 m (6 ft 10 in)	Tau Ceramica	(Spain)
SG	8	Lucas Victoriano	24 – 5 November 1977	1.94 m (6 ft 4 in)	Caprabo Lleida	(Spain)
C	9	Gabriel Fernández	25 – 23 October 1976	2.04 m (6 ft 8 in)	Tau Ceramica	(Spain)
SF	10	Hugo Sconochini	31 – 10 April 1971	1.94 m (6 ft 4 in)	Tau Ceramica	(Spain)
PF	11	Luis Scola	22 – 30 April 1980	2.06 m (6 ft 9 in)	Tau Ceramica	(Spain)
PF	12	Leonardo Gutiérrez	24 – 16 May 1978	2.03 m (6 ft 8 in)	Atenas	(Argentina)
SF	13	Andrés Nocioni	23 – 30 January 1979	2.01 m (6 ft 7 in)	Tau Ceramica	(Spain)
SF	14	Leandro Palladino	26 – 13 January 1976	1.95 m (6 ft 5 in)	Napoli	(Italy)
C	15	Rubén Wolkowyski	28 – 30 September 1973	2.08 m (6 ft 10 in)	CSKA Moscow	(Russia)

Head coach

- (Argentina) Ruben Magnano

Legend

- (C) Team captain
- *Club field describes country of last club before the tournament
  - Age – describes age
    on 29 August 2002
- Injured

=== New Zealand ===
New Zealand men's national basketball team roster
Players
Coaches

Pos.	No.	Name	Age – Date of birth	Height	Club	Ctr.
PG	4	Mark Dickel	25 – 21 December 1976	1.87 m (6 ft 2 in)	Wellington Saints	(New Zealand)
PG	5	Judd Flavell	28 – December 31, 1973	1.86 m (6 ft 1 in)	Nelson Giants	(New Zealand)
SG	6	Kirk Penney	21 – 23 November 1980	1.96 m (6 ft 5 in)	Wisconsin	(United States)
PG	7	Paul Henare	23 – 4 March 1979	1.82 m (6 ft 0 in)	Hawke's Bay Hawks	(New Zealand)
SG	8	Phill Jones	28 – 25 January 1974	1.97 m (6 ft 6 in)	Cantu	(Italy)
SG	9	Paora Winitana	25 – 6 December 1976	1.95 m (6 ft 5 in)	Harbour Kings	(New Zealand)
SF	10	Dillon Boucher	26 – 27 December 1975	1.95 m (6 ft 5 in)	Waikato Titans	(New Zealand)
PF	11	Pero Cameron	28 – 5 June 1974	2.00 m (6 ft 7 in)	Chester Jets	(United Kingdom)
PF	12	Damon Rampton	23 – 18 December 1978	2.03 m (6 ft 8 in)	Nelson Giants	(New Zealand)
C	13	Ed Book	31 – 23 September 1970	2.10 m (6 ft 11 in)	Nelson Giants	(New Zealand)
C	14	Sean Marks	27 – 25 August 1975	2.08 m (6 ft 10 in)	Miami Heat	(United States)
C	15	Robert Hickey	28 – 12 January 1974	2.09 m (6 ft 10 in)	Hawke's Bay Hawks	(New Zealand)

Head coach

- (United States) Tab Baldwin

Legend

- (C) Team captain
- *Club field describes country of last club before the tournament
  - Age – describes age
    on 29 August 2002
- Injured

=== Russia ===
Russia men's national basketball team roster
Players
Coaches

Pos.	No.	Name	Age – Date of birth	Height	Club	Ctr.
PG	4	Vasily Karasev	31 – 14 April 1971	1.93 m (6 ft 4 in)	Ural	(Russia)
C	5	Aleksandr Bashminov	24 – 7 May 1978	2.12 m (6 ft 11 in)	Ural	(Russia)
SF	6	Sergei Panov	32 – 30 June 1970	2.03 m (6 ft 8 in)	Ural	(Russia)
SG	7	Igor Kudelin	30 – 10 August 1972	1.95 m (6 ft 5 in)	CSKA Moscow	(Russia)
SG	8	Sergei Chikalkin	26 – 11 December 1975	1.96 m (6 ft 5 in)	Benetton	(Italy)
PF	9	Nikita Morgunov	27 – 29 June 1975	2.11 m (6 ft 11 in)	Avtodor	(Russia)
PG	10	Evgeniy Pashutin	33 – 6 February 1969	1.90 m (6 ft 3 in)	UNICS	(Russia)
SG	11	Zakhar Pashutin	28 – 3 May 1974	1.96 m (6 ft 5 in)	CSKA Moscow	(Russia)
PF	12	Victor Khryapa	20 – August 3, 1982	2.03 m (6 ft 8 in)	Avtodor	(Russia)
SF	13	Andrei Kirilenko	21 – 18 February 1981	2.06 m (6 ft 9 in)	Utah Jazz	(United States)
SF	14	Ruslan Avleev	26 – 4 June 1976	2.00 m (6 ft 7 in)	UNICS	(Russia)
C	15	Alexey Savrasenko	23 – 28 February 1979	2.15 m (7 ft 1 in)	Olympiacos	(Greece)

Head coach

- (Russia) Stanislav Yeryomin

Legend

- (C) Team captain
- *Club field describes country of last club before the tournament
  - Age – describes age
    on 29 August 2002
- Injured

=== Venezuela ===
- Víctor Díaz
- Pablo Ezequiel Machado
- Yumerving Ernesto Mijares
- Richard Lugo
- Alejandro Jose Quiroz
- Óscar Torres
- Diego Guevara
- Carl Herrera
- Héctor Romero
- Vladimir Heredia
- Tomás Aguilera
- Carlos Morris

coach:James Calvin
