= Therese Walsh =

New Zealand businesswoman

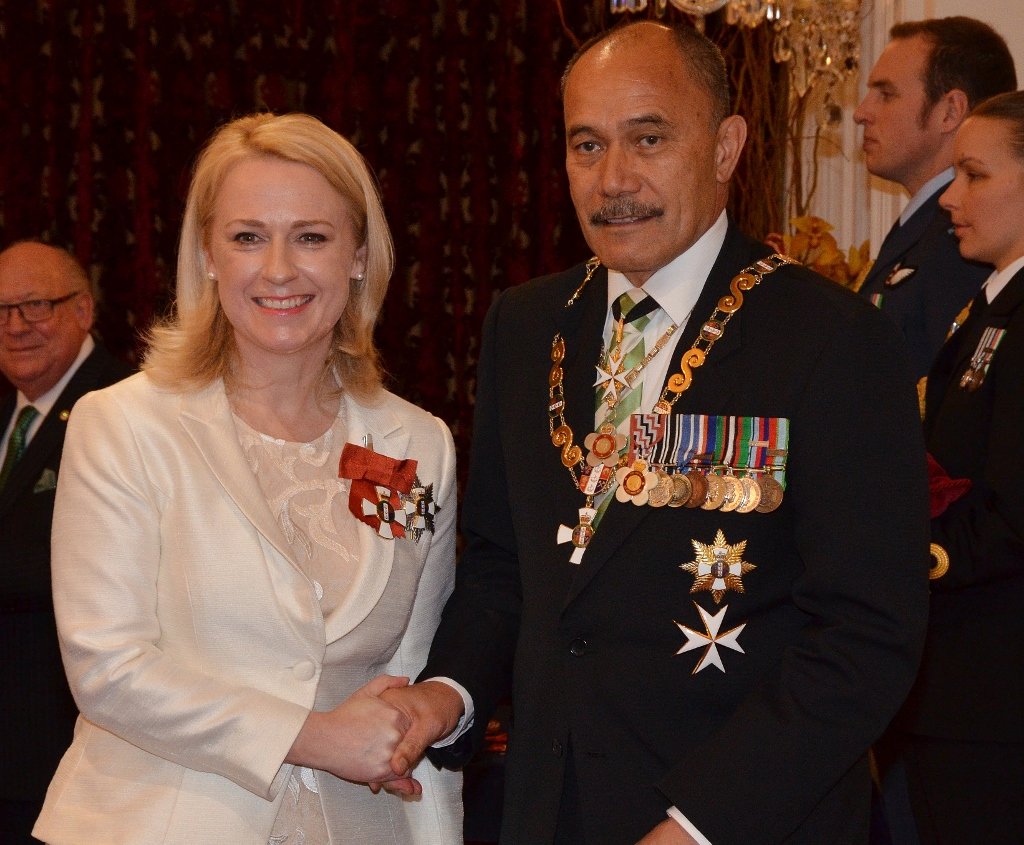
Walsh in 2015, after her investiture as a Dame Companion of the New Zealand Order of Merit by the governor-general, Sir Jerry Mateparae

Dame Therese Maria Walsh DNZM (born 1971 or 1972) is a chief executive and business leader from New Zealand. Her particular successes include her roles as the chief operating officer for the 2011 Rugby World Cup and head of the organising body for the 2015 Cricket World Cup, held in Australia and New Zealand.

== Career ==
Walsh was born and grew up in Wellington where she went to school at St Mary's College before studying accounting at Victoria University of Wellington. She started her professional life as a chartered accountant and auditor at KPMG in the city. In 2003 she moved to work for the New Zealand Rugby Union as general manager of corporate services and later as chief financial officer, and was then appointed to the team that worked on the winning bid to host the 2011 Rugby World Cup in New Zealand.

Following her success with New Zealand rugby, Walsh became a director of New Zealand Cricket. She was the head of New Zealand's 2015 Cricket World Cup campaign and successfully negotiated for New Zealand to host a significant number of the games and events, including a semifinal held in Auckland, and the opening ceremony held in Christchurch.

Walsh serves on the boards of NZX, ASB, and Air New Zealand. She was chair of Television New Zealand from 2015 to 2019 and has chaired the Air New Zealand board since September 2019. She is also a member of the Government’s Major Events Investment Panel, chairs the International Development Advisory and Selection Panel for the Ministry of Foreign Affairs and Trade and serves on the Government’s Strategic Risk and Resilience Panel. She is a trustee of Wellington Regional Stadium, and a Victoria University Council member.

Walsh is also an ambassador for the Wellington Homeless Women’s Trust.

=== Recognition ===
In 2005, Walsh was the regional winner of the NZIM Young Executive of the Year Award. In 2013, Walsh received the New Zealand Women of Influence Supreme Award in recognition of her impact at local, regional and national levels. In 2014 she received a Blake Leader Award, and in the 2015 Queen's Birthday Honours, she was appointed a Dame Companion of the New Zealand Order of Merit for services to sports administration.
