= Sarah Delahunty =

New Zealand writer and director

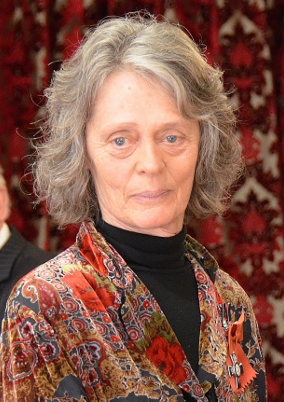
Delahunty in 2015

Sarah Delahunty MNZM (born 1952) is a New Zealand writer and director who was born in Wellington. An award-winning playwright, Delahunty has written over 30 plays, often focussing on works for youth.

In the 2015 Queen's Birthday Honours, Delahunty was appointed a Member of the New Zealand Order of Merit, for services to theatre.

== Life ==
Delahunty was born in Wellington, and grew up there with her sister, politician Catherine Delahunty. Sarah enrolled at the New Zealand Drama School but found it boring and left after ten days. She then worked at Downstage Theatre, before getting a lead role as Lyndsey on soap opera Close to Home.

== Awards ==
- Best Theatre, NZ Fringe Festival Affinity
- 2012 Playmarket's Plays for the Young Competition The Beanstalkers
- 2009 Playmarket's Plays for Young Competition 2b or not 2b
- 2008 Pick of the Fringe 2b or not 2b
- 1987 Bruce Mason Playwriting Award

== Publications ==
Two Plays Sarah Delahunty (Playmarket, 2009); 2b or nt 2b and Eating the Wolf.

== Plays ==
- 2020 - #UsTwo: Six Decades of Sisterhood
- 2019 - This Long Winter
- 2018 - Question Time Blues with Catherine Delahunty
- 2015 – Where She Stood, nominated for 2016 Fringe Festival Residency Award
- 2014 – 4 billion likes
- 2013 – Affinity
- 2011 – Falling Sparrows Here or There
- 2011 – Crazy Joint Love
- 2010 – Song of Four
- 2010 – Trusting Strangers, Counting Stars
- 2010 – Inside Out
- 2010 – Medea Songs
- 2008 – The Antigone Project
- 2008 – 2b or nt 2b
- 2007 – Another Planet
- 2007 – Homework
- 2006 – Superbeast
- 2005 – Eating the Wolf
- 2002 – Driving You Crazy
- 2002 – The Oddity
- 2002 – Lifelines (music by Michelle Scullion)
- Time On Our Side
- 2000 – Damage
- Blind Date
- Dear Felicity
- 1998 – The Last Gasp Café
- 1996 – Second Sight
- 1992 – Gifts
- Greener Grass
- 1986 – Loose Connections
- 1985 – Stretchmarks

== Plays for children ==
- The Beanstalkers
- Friends Forever
- Sleeping Beauty
- Magic in the Air
- The Emperor's New Clothes
- Beauty and the Beast
- Puss in Boots
- The Adventures of Toad (adaptation)
- Harry Under the Bed
- The Frog Prince
- The Tinderbox
- Jack and the Beanstalk
- Rumpelstiltskin
- The Gingerbread Man
- Snow White and Rose Red
- The BFG (adaptation)
- The Twits (adaptation)
