= Rae de Lisle =

New Zealand pianist and music educator

Rae de Lisle MNZM
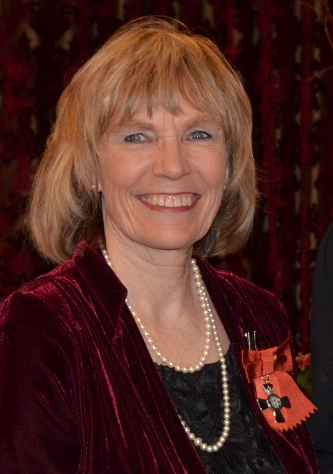
- De Lisle in 2015
- Born: Rae de Lisle; 1947 (age 77–78); Wellington, New Zealand
- Spouse: Bill McCarthy (m. 1977)

Rae de Lisle MNZM (born 1947) is a New Zealand pianist and music educator.

De Lisle attended Wellington East Girls' College then studied at Victoria University of Wellington, graduating in 1969 with a Bachelor of Arts degree. In 1967 she won the Auckland Star Piano Competition.

De Lisle was awarded a scholarship from the New Zealand Arts Council. She went to London for eight years, including four years studying at the Guildhall School of Music. While in London she won the Sheriff’s Piano Prize, the Victor Hoddy Memorial Prize and the Jubilee Scholarship. Performances in London included concerts at the Wigmore Hall and in the BBC recital series.

De Lisle returned to New Zealand in 1977 and performed in New Zealand and in the USA, Canada and Australia as a soloist, accompanist and chamber musician. She recorded for radio and television, and often played with the New Zealand Symphony Orchestra. She won the Mobil Award for best classical recording in 1990.

In 1993, de Lisle injured her wrist while playing piano and was forced to give up her performance career. She changed her focus to teaching and investigating performance-related injury prevention in musicians. In 2000, de Lisle accepted a teaching role at the University of Auckland, where as of 2021 she is associate professor of piano. She completed a PhD, writing her thesis on focal dystonia, and is well-known for her remedial work with pianists recovering from injury. This led to publication in 2018 of an interactive book of exercises for piano technique.

In the 2015 Queen's Birthday Honours, de Lisle was appointed a Member of the New Zealand Order of Merit, for services to music.

== Personal life ==
De Lisle is married to broadcaster Bill McCarthy. They met in 1975 when he interviewed her for a television programme while she was on a brief trip back to New Zealand, and married in 1977. The couple have two daughters.
