= Roy Crawford =

University administrator and mechanical engineer (1949–2016)

Roy Crawford CNZM FIMMM FREng
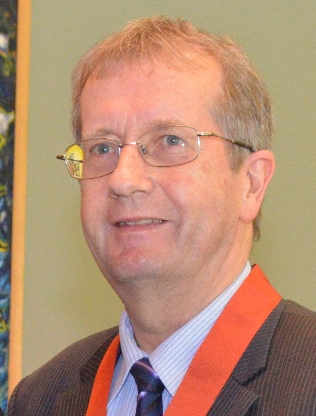
- Crawford in 2015
- Born: 6 April 1949; Lisburn, Northern Ireland
- Died: 23 June 2016 (aged 67); Auckland, New Zealand
- Spouse: Renee Crawford
- Children: 3

Academic background
- Education: Queen's University Belfast

Academic work
- Discipline: Mechanical engineering
- Institutions: Queen's University Belfast; University of Auckland; University of Waikato
- Main interests: Rotational moulding

Vice-chancellor of the University of Waikato
- In office 2005–2014
- Preceded by: Bryan Gould
- Succeeded by: Neil Quigley

Chair of Universities New Zealand
- In office 2013–2014
- Preceded by: Pat Walsh
- Succeeded by: Harlene Hayne

Robert James "Roy" Crawford CNZM (6 April 1949 – 23 June 2016) was a university administrator and mechanical engineering academic. His primary research interest was in the mechanical properties and processing behaviour of plastics.

== Early life and education ==
Crawford was born on 6 April 1949 in Lisburn, Northern Ireland. He attended Lisburn Technical College before studying mechanical engineering at Queen's University Belfast, where he earned a first-class BSc in 1970, followed by a PhD in 1973. He received a DSc from the same university in 1987.

== Career ==
In 1972, Crawford's first academic post was as an assistant lecturer in Engineering at Queen's University Belfast. He rose to the rank of lecturer in 1974, senior lecturer in 1982, and reader in 1984. In 1989, he was appointed professor of Mechanical Engineering and director of the university's School of Mechanical and Process Engineering. He was also responsible for establishing the Polymer Processing Research Centre. This centre included the research group on rotational moulding of plastics, which he also established. From 1999 to 2001, he was professor of mechanical engineering at the University of Auckland in New Zealand.

From 2001 to 2004, Crawford was pro vice-chancellor for research at Queen's University Belfast. From January 2005 until December 2014, he was vice chancellor of the University of Waikato in New Zealand.

Crawford published nine books and about 300 papers, and was a member of numerous government panels and research grant committees in the United Kingdom. He was an expert in the rotational moulding of plastics, and gave keynote lectures, courses and seminars on this subject all over the world. During his tenure at Queen's in the 1990s, his school improved its rating in the Research Assessment Exercise (RAE) from grade 3 in the 1992 RAE to the top grade of 5* in 1996. He was a member of the 2001 RAE Panel for assessing mechanical engineering at all British universities.

== Honours and recognitions ==
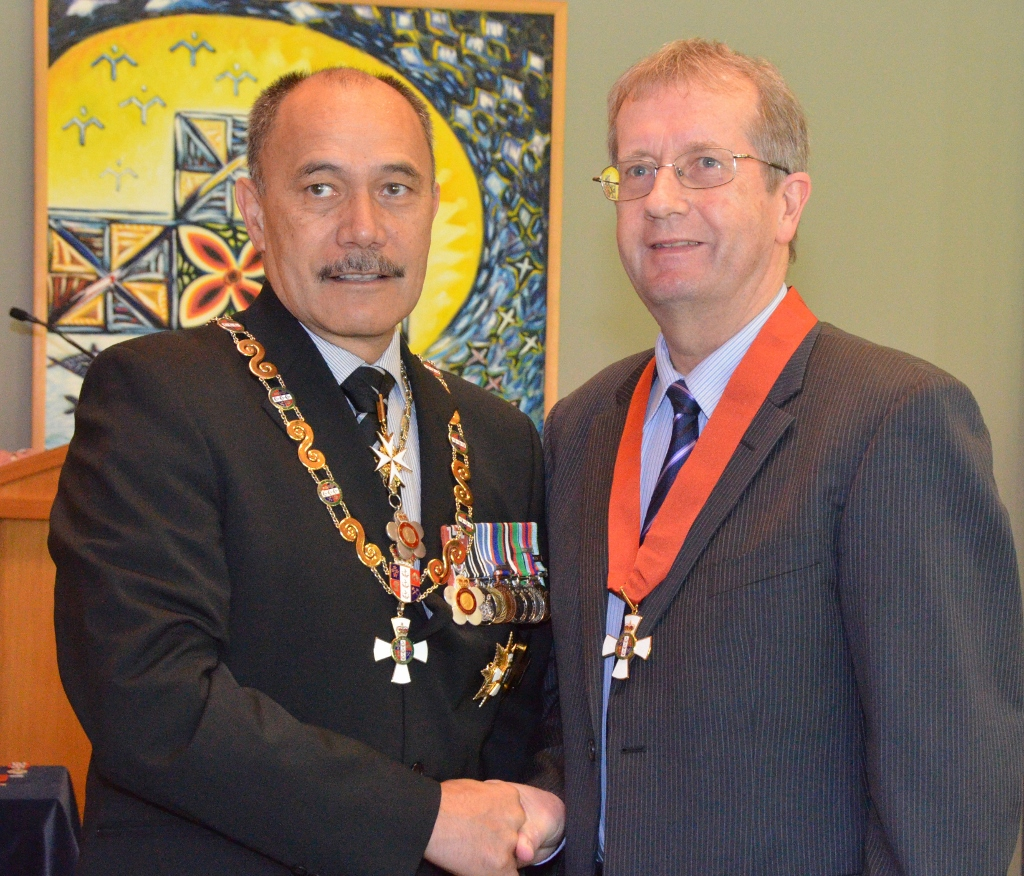
Crawford (right) in 2015, after his investiture as a Companion of the New Zealand Order of Merit by the governor-general, Sir Jerry Mateparae

In 1998, Crawford was elected as a Fellow of the Royal Academy of Engineering, and in 2005 he was elected as a Fellow of the Society of Plastics Engineers. Only 227 Fellows have been elected worldwide to this society since it was established in 1946. In the 2015 Queen's Birthday Honours, Crawford was appointed a Companion of the New Zealand Order of Merit, for services to tertiary education.

== Personal life and death ==
A British national and permanent resident of New Zealand, Crawford was married with three children. He died on 23 June 2016, aged 67 years. His funeral took place on 1 July at Manukau Memorial Gardens Chapel, and a memorial service for him was held at University of Waikato on 6 July.

Academic offices
| Preceded by Bryan Gould | Vice-Chancellor of the University of Waikato; 2005–2014 | Succeeded by Neil Quigley |
