= 2015 Birthday Honours (New Zealand) =

Awards list for New Zealand

2015 Queen's Birthday Honours
- Previous: 2015 New Year Honours; Next: 2015 gallantry awards
- Type: New Zealand royal honours: Order of New Zealand; New Zealand Order of Merit; Queen's Service Order; Queen's Service Medal; Distinguished Service Decoration
- Date: 1 June 2015
- Country: New Zealand

Highlights
- Total recipients: 188

The 2015 Queen's Birthday Honours in New Zealand, celebrating the official birthday of Queen Elizabeth II, were appointments made by the Queen in her right as Queen of New Zealand, on the advice of the New Zealand government, to various orders and honours to reward and highlight good works by New Zealanders. They were announced on 1 June 2015.

The recipients of honours are listed here as they were styled before their new honour.

== Order of New Zealand (ONZ) ==
Ordinary member

- Professor Sir Peter David Gluckman KNZM FRS – of Auckland. For services to New Zealand.
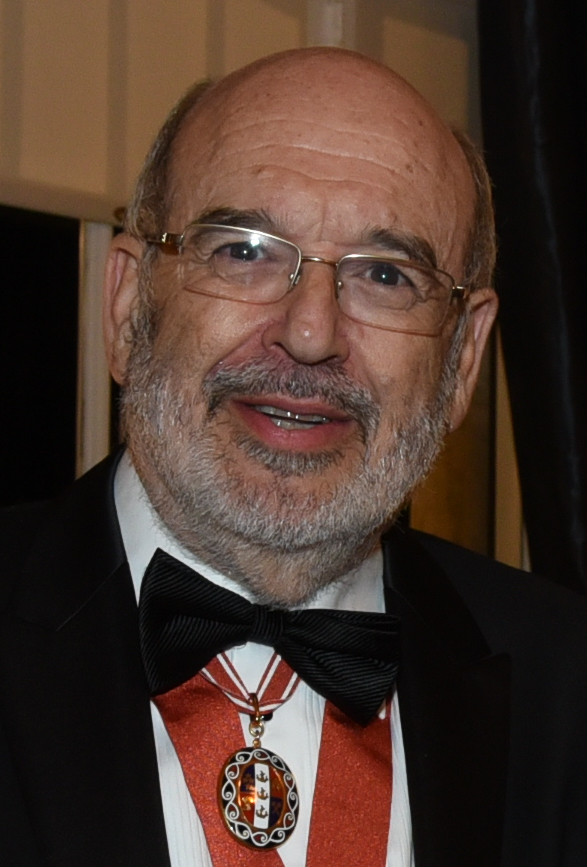
Sir Peter Gluckman

== New Zealand Order of Merit ==
=== Dame Companion (DNZM) ===
- Bronwen Scott Holdsworth ONZM – of Gisborne. For services to business and the arts.
- Diane Elizabeth Robertson – of Auckland. For services to the community.
- Therese Maria Walsh – of Wellington. For services to sports administration.
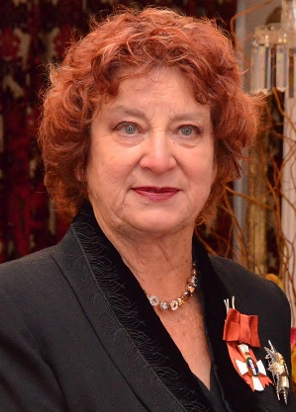
Dame Bronwen Holdsworth

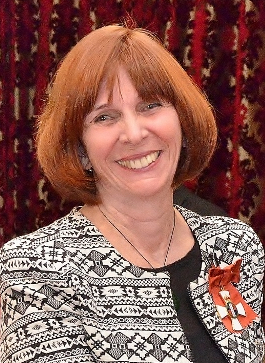
Dame Diane Robertson

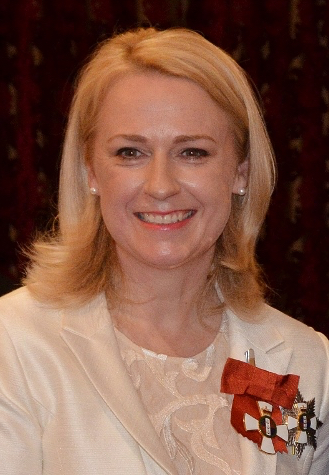
Dame Therese Walsh

=== Knight Companion (KNZM) ===
- The Honourable James Kenneth McLay CNZM QSO – of Matakana. For services to business and the State.
- Dr The Honourable Pita Russell Sharples CBE – of Auckland. For services as a member of parliament and to Māori.
- Peter Ivan Talijancich (also known as Peter Talley) ONZM – of Motueka. For services to business and philanthropy.
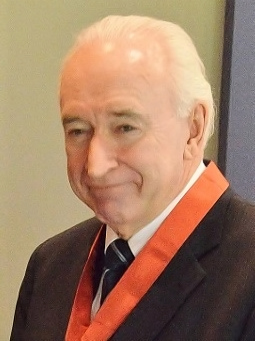
Sir Jim McLay

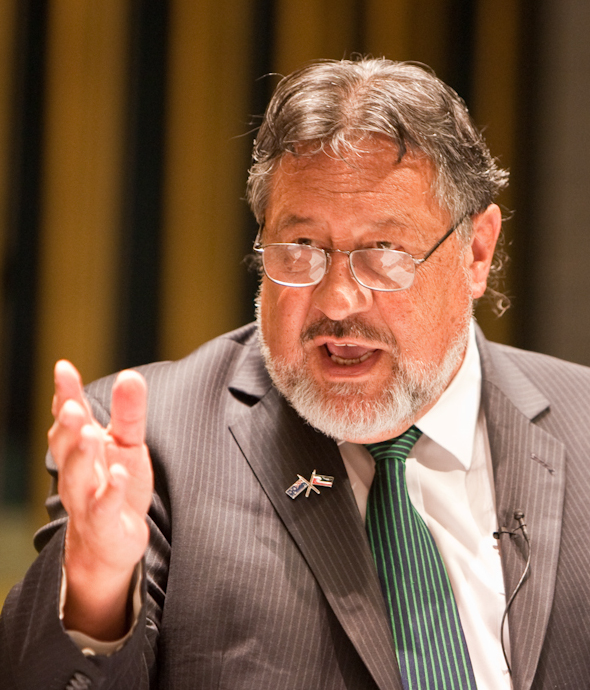
Sir Pita Sharples

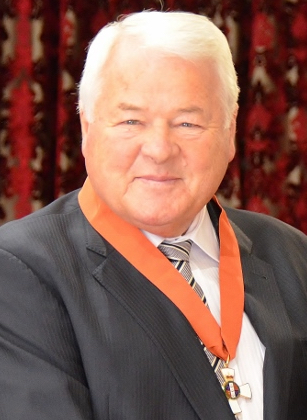
Sir Peter Talley

=== Companion (CNZM) ===
- Associate Professor Christopher Hugh Atkinson – of Christchurch. For services to cancer care.
- Professor David Michael Bibby – of Lower Hutt. For services to science and education.
- Professor Robert James Crawford – of Auckland. For services to tertiary education.
- Tagaloatele Professor Margaret Ellen Fairbairn-Dunlop ONZM – of Auckland. For services to education and the Pacific community.
- Robert Bertram Keith Gardiner ONZM – of Auckland. For services to philanthropy and the arts.
- Michael Crawfurd Macknight – of Dunedin. For services to science.
- John Livingston Marshall QC – of Wellington. For services to the law.
- Professor Graham Wilfred Mellsop – of Auckland. For services to psychiatry.
- Dr Philip Thomas Norman – of Christchurch. For services to music and musical theatre.
- Geoffrey Owen Poole – of Wānaka. For services to the meat industry.
- Maxwell Noall Ritchie – of Auckland. For services to health and the community.
- Dr Lionel John Wood QSO – of Kaikōura. For services to tertiary education and Māori.
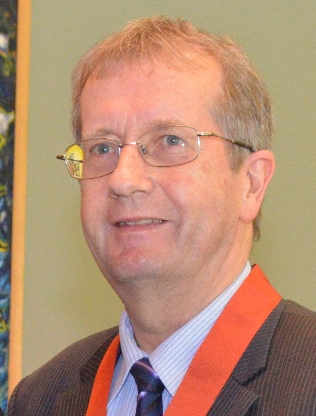
Roy Crawford

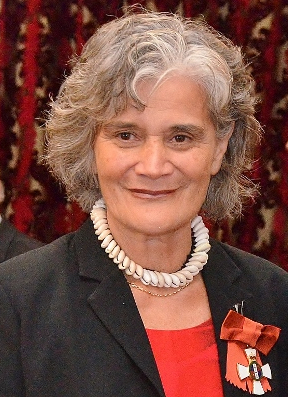
Peggy Fairbairn-Dunlop

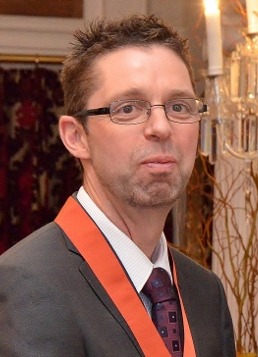
Michael Macknight

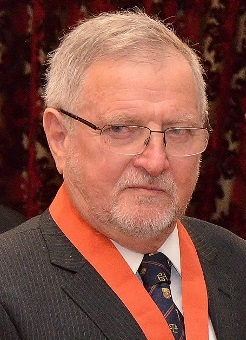
John Wood

=== Officer (ONZM) ===
- Dr Jonathan James Baskett – of Auckland. For services to health.
- Jennifer Lillian Beck – of Auckland. For services to children's literature.
- Melissa Jannet Clark-Reynolds – of Wellington. For services to the technology industry.
- Carol Anne Donaldson – of Christchurch. For services to people with intellectual disabilities.
- Murray James Dudfield MNZM – of Wellington. For services to the New Zealand Fire Service.
- Dr Gavin Peter Ellis – of Auckland. For services to journalism.
- Edward Weller Ellison – of Dunedin. For services to Māori and conservation.
- Anita Finnigan – of Auckland. For services to education and the Pacific community.
- Maxwell Harold Gimblett – of New York, United States. For services to art.
- Dr Christopher Neville Hale – of Auckland. For services to horticultural science and the summerfruit industry.
- Anthony John Hawken – of Whakatāne. For services to the kiwifruit industry.
- Michael James Hesson – of Dunedin. For services to cricket.
- Professor Emeritus Boyd Robert Jones – of Katikati. For services to veterinary medicine.
- Tuiātaga Fa'afua Savelina Leavasa-Tautolo QSM – of Auckland. For services to education, arts and the Pacific community.
- Barry Gordon Lett – of Warkworth. For services to art and conservation.
- Detective Superintendent Andrew James Lovelock – of Auckland. For services to the New Zealand Police and the community.
- Raewyn Jeanette Lovett – of Auckland. For services to netball.
- Judith Mary MacKenzie – of Auckland. For services to mental health.
- Alexander Keith Robertson Mair – of Taupō. For services to basketball.
- Brendon Barrie McCullum – of Christchurch. For services to cricket.
- Douglas Alexander McKay – of Auckland. For services to business and local government.
- Professor Elizabeth Ann McKinley – of Melbourne, Australia. For services to education and Māori.
- Andrew Roderick Meehan – of Wellington. For services to youth and tourism.
- Donna Lesley Neill – of Christchurch. For services to victim support.
- Dr George Ngaei – of Invercargill. For services to health and the Pacific community.
- Louise Nicholas – of Rotorua. For services to the prevention of sexual violence.
- Nicholas Thomas Nobilo – of Auckland. For services to the wine industry.
- Mark Rundle Pennington – of Wellington. For services to design.
- Te Wahapu Rapana – of Tuakau. For services to Māori.
- Denise Sheat – of Rolleston. For services to Māori and education.
- Maretta Tuasivi Solomon – of Auckland. For services to education and the Pacific community.
- Pulotu Arthur Gus Solomon – of Auckland. For services to education and the Pacific community.
- Brian William Stevenson – of Auckland. For services to the arts and health.
- Sergeant Robin Bruce Woodley – of Auckland. For services to the New Zealand Police and youth.
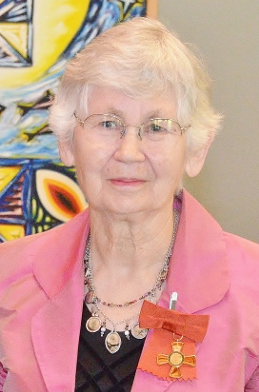
Jennifer Beck

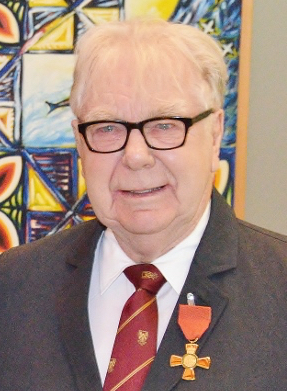
Max Gimblett

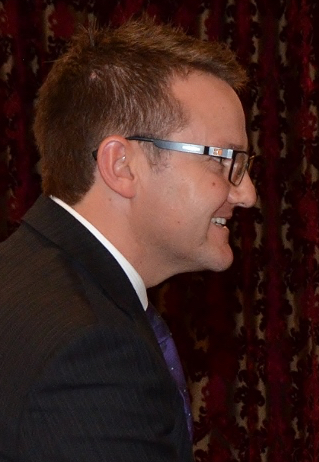
Mike Hesson

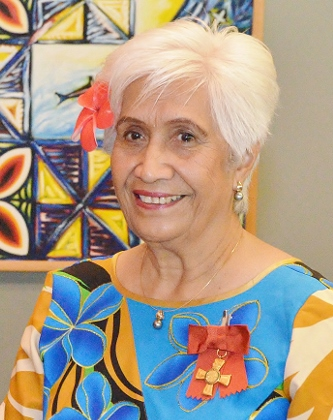
Fa'afua Leavasa‑Tautolo

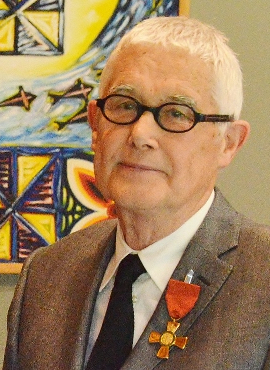
Barry Lett

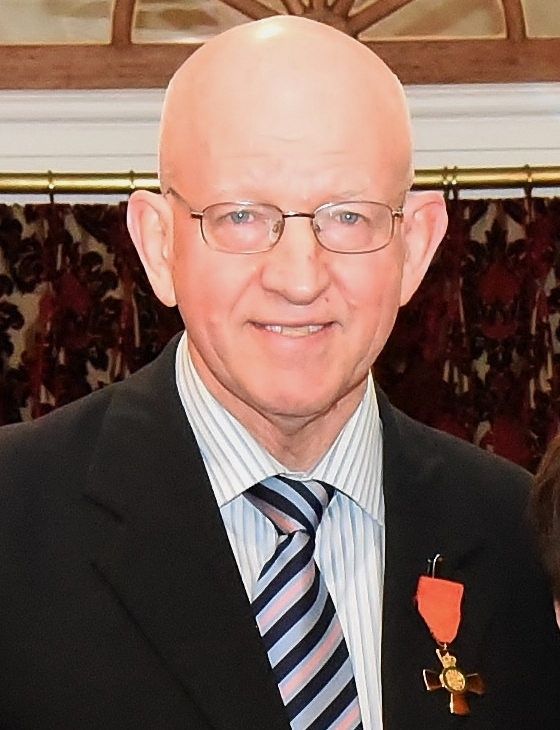
Keith Mair

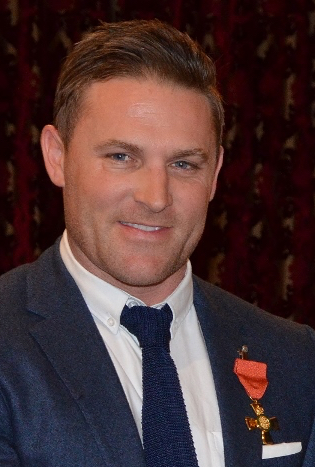
Brendon McCullum

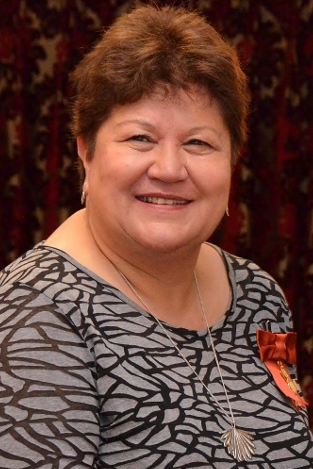
Elizabeth McKinley

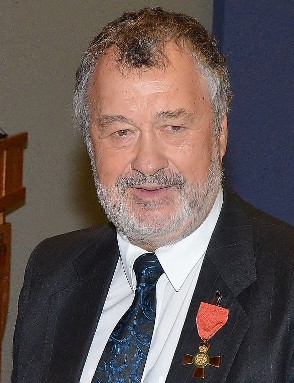
George Ngaei

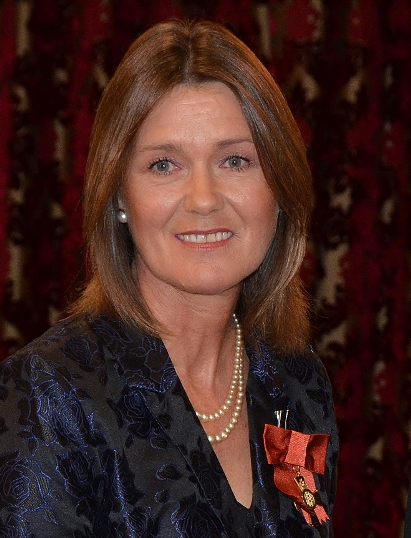
Louise Nicholas

=== Member (MNZM) ===
- John Walker Bain JP – of Whangārei. For services to the community and sport.
- Colleen Margaret Bond – of Gore. For services to netball.
- Andrew Garth Browning – of New Plymouth. For services to health and the community.
- Henri Jacques Burkhardt – of Auckland. For services to Māori.
- Linda Maldwyn Clapham – of Wellsford. For services to the community.
- Dr Lynne Melissa Coleman – of Auckland. For services as a sports doctor.
- Margaret Anne Comer – of Hamilton. For services to philanthropy.
- Paul David Daley – of Auckland. For services to education.
- Trevor Frank Daley – of Invercargill. For services to music.
- Associate Professor Rae de Lisle – of Auckland. For services to music.
- Sarah Delahunty – of Paekākāriki. For services to theatre.
- Dr Michelle Emma Dickinson – of Auckland. For services to science.
- Richard Maurice Edmonds – of Picton. For services to art and the community.
- Lesley Frances Elliott – of Dunedin. For services to the prevention of domestic violence.
- Terence John Farrell – of Hokitika. For services to conservation.
- Latoatama Halatau – of Auckland. For services to the blind and the Pacific community.
- Lieutenant Colonel Peter Davis Hall – of New York, United States of America. For services to the New Zealand Defence Force.
- Geoffrey Thomas Henry – of Wellington. For services to athletics.
- David Ernest Albert Hill – of Oamaru. For services to Paralympic sport and health.
- Elizabeth Anne Horgan – of Auckland. For services to primary education.
- Rachel Ruth Jacobsen – of Seattle, United States of America. For services to New Zealand-United States relations.
- Timothy Clarence Johnson – of Auckland. For services to disability sport.
- Ann Mary Judson Farr – of Christchurch. For services to ballet.
- David Kernohan – of Carterton. For services to architecture.
- Mauriora Kingi JP – of Rotorua. For services to Māori.
- Dr Norman Edgar MacLean – of Invercargill. For services to obstetrics and gynaecology.
- Professor Roderick Duncan MacLeod – of Auckland. For services to hospice and palliative care.
- Bruce William Martin – of Napier. For services to tertiary education.
- Peter John Masters – of Taupō. For services to Search and Rescue, conservation and cycling.
- Beverley May McConnell QSM – of Auckland. For services to horticulture.
- Donald Gordon McFarlane JP – of Geraldine. For services to agriculture and the community.
- Anne Edith Miles – of Auckland. For services to education.
- Paula Mary Morgan (Paula Hunt) – of Wellington. For services to dance.
- Graeme Douglas Murray JP – of Lake Tekapo. For services to tourism and conservation.
- Peter Francis Murray – of Auckland. For services to basketball.
- Deirdre Gay Neville-White – of Auckland. For services to children's health.
- Nigel Ngahiwi – of Levin. For services to the blind and Māori.
- Mary O'Hagan – of Wellington. For services to mental health.
- Manahi Paewai JP – of Dannevirke. For services to Māori.
- Thomas William Parsons – of Picton. For services to education.
- Jennifer Helen Pearce – of Auckland. For services to sports nutrition.
- Marcia Veronica Kathleen Petley – of Hamilton. For services to athletics.
- Nora Tawhi Rameka – of Kerikeri. For services to Māori and education.
- John Clive Rennie – of Whanganui. For services to education and sport.
- Bruce Stuart Ritchie – of Auckland. For services to education.
- Robyn Rosemary Rosie – of Te Puke. For services to education.
- Allan Martin Rumble – of Rotorua. For services to education.
- James Stewart Ryburn – of Oxford. For services to the New Zealand Fire Service and the community.
- Terrence Maxwell Sheldrake – of Gisborne. For services to sport.
- Kereyn Maree Smith – of Auckland. For services to sports governance.
- Neville Rohan Smith – of Napier. For services to philanthropy and the community.
- Keith Albert Stanton – of Christchurch. For services to business and philanthropy.
- Paul David Swallow – of Porirua. For services to the State and the community.
- Dr Anthony Haydon Townsend – of Whangamatā. For services to health.
- Bruce Arthur Trask – of Tauranga. For services to the environment and sport.
- Richard Arland Ussher – of Nelson. For services to multisport.
- Allen Wihongi – of Kamo. For services to Māori, the arts and education.
- Neil Wilkinson – of Rangiora. For services to education.
- Tawhirimatea Te Auripo Rewita Williams – of Auckland. For services to Māori and education.
- Waynne Stewart Williams – of Christchurch. For services to the television industry.
- Michael Hedley Willis – of Christchurch. For services to wildlife conservation.

Honorary

- Freddy Edy Andre Declerck – of Langemark, Belgium. For services to New Zealand–Belgium relations and war commemoration.
- Sandy Evrard – of Mesen, Belgium. For services to New Zealand–Belgium relations and war commemoration.
- Benoit Mottrie – of Ypres, Belgium. For services to New Zealand–Belgium relations and war commemoration.
- Steven Reynaert – of Ypres, Belgium. For services to New Zealand–Belgium relations and war commemoration.
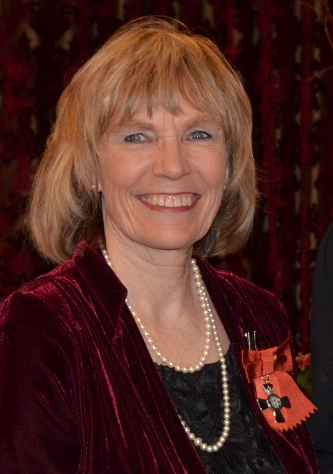
Rae de Lisle

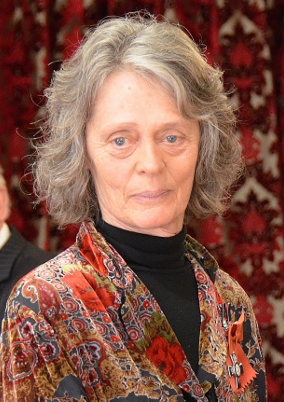
Sarah Delahunty

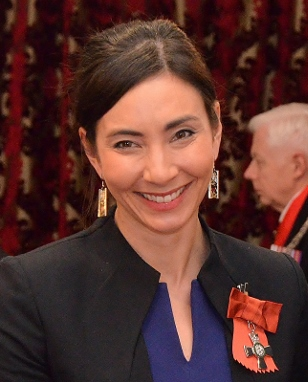
Michelle Dickinson

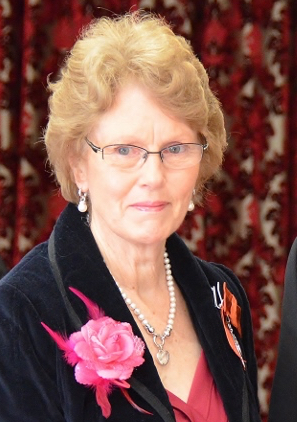
Lesley Elliott

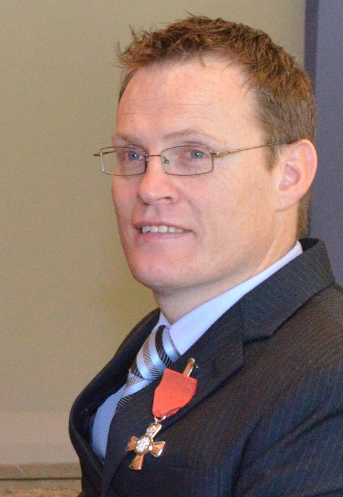
Tim Johnson

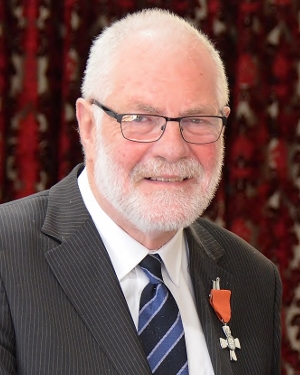
David Kernohan

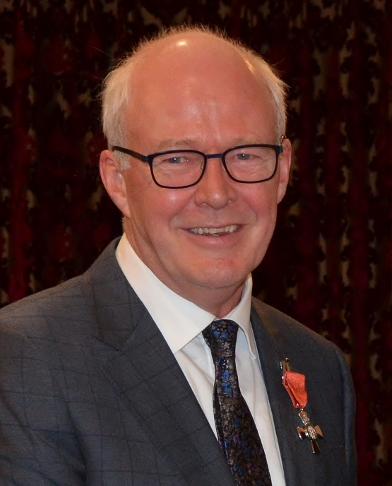
Rod MacLeod

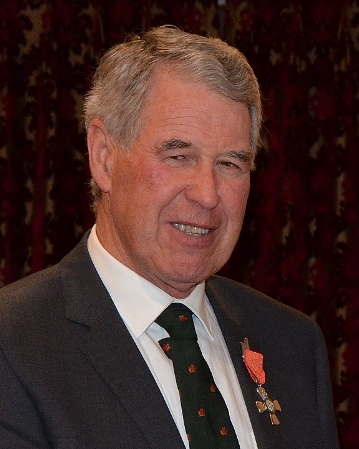
Don McFarlane

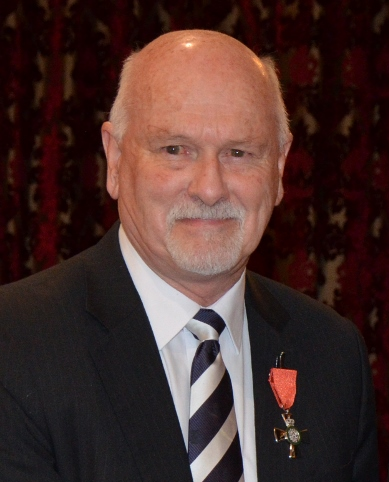
Clive Rennie

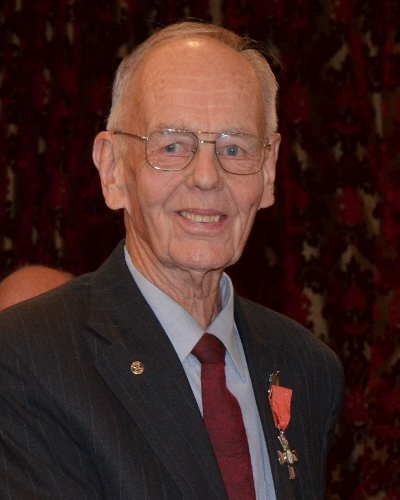
Keith Stanton

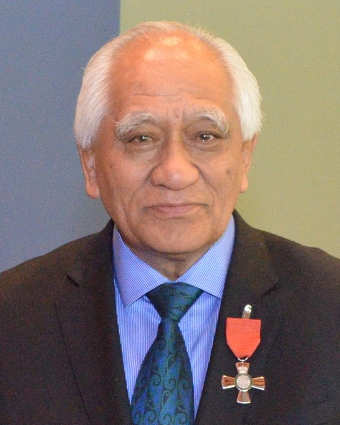
Tawhiri Williams

== Companion of the Queen's Service Order (QSO) ==
- Judge Neil MacLean – of Hamilton. For services to the judiciary.
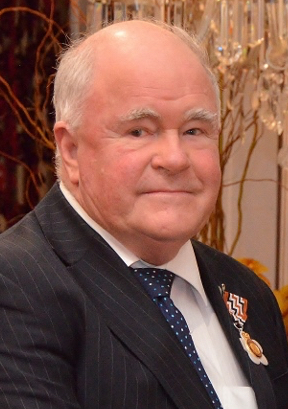
Neil MacLean

== Queen's Service Medal (QSM) ==
- Gary John Aburn – of Whataroa. For services to conservation.
- Bryan Andrews – of Christchurch. For services to the community and sport.
- Edward Brian Andrews – of Nelson. For services to the community.
- Susan Eileen Baker Wilson – of Katikati. For services to historical research and war commemoration.
- Judith Merenako Billens – of Nelson. For services to Māori.
- Allen Clement Birchall – of Dunedin. For services to landscape architecture.
- Paku Jane Brown – of Gisborne. For services to Māori.
- Shirley Doris Brown – of Greymouth. For services to tennis.
- Weixing Che JP – of Auckland. For services to the Chinese community.
- Wendy Corrine Coutts – of Blenheim. For services to people with disabilities and motorsport.
- Nancy Kathleen Crawford – of Auckland. For services to people with Williams syndrome.
- Geraldine Butler Dunwoodie – of Thames. For services to heritage preservation.
- Erin Meryl Fleming JP – of Pukekohe. For services to the community.
- Harima Thelma Renei Fraser – of Auckland. For services to veterans and Māori.
- Neilson John Gifford – of Morrinsville. For services to squash.
- Moo Lock Gock – of Auckland. For services to the horticulture industry.
- John Patrick Goodin – of New Plymouth. For services to the community.
- Valmai Jeanne Hall – of Gisborne. For services to senior citizens and people with disabilities.
- David Leigh Halstead – of Christchurch. For services to business and the community.
- Susan Heath – of Tauranga. For services to foster care.
- Ronald Boyd Hudson – of Palmerston North. For services to Māori.
- Leonard Keith Hughes – of Pauanui. For services to the New Zealand Fire Service.
- Cyril Elder Jenks – of Auckland. For services to the welfare of wild horses.
- Marilyn Kathleen Jenks – of Auckland. For services to the welfare of wild horses.
- David Peter Jones – of Auckland. For services to the community and philanthropy.
- Faye Mollie Kainuku – of Masterton. For services to people with diabetes.
- Dr Barry Caine Knight – of Whangamatā. For services to health.
- Murray Philip Lamb – of Woodend. For services to the New Zealand Fire Service.
- Kathryn Jane Logan – of Auckland. For services to swimming and waterpolo.
- Terence Robert Logan – of Auckland. For services to swimming and waterpolo.
- Ethel Taihaere Macpherson – of Gisborne. For services to Māori and education.
- Prudence Jane Matthews – of Blenheim. For services to heritage preservation.
- Norma McCallum – of Waikanae. For services to the community.
- Lynette Ann McFedries – of Ōtaki. For services to surf life saving.
- Napier Hugh McFedries – of Ōtaki. For services to surf life saving.
- Colin Peter McKenna – of Featherston. For services to the New Zealand Fire Service.
- Vivienne Carol McLean – of Whitianga. For services to conservation.
- Minarapa Mitai-Ngatai – of Rotorua. For services to Māori and the community.
- Dr Daniel Muthumala JP – of Wellington. For services to the Sri Lankan community.
- Betty Edith Nelley – of Maungaturoto. For services to history and tourism.
- Stewart Tuari John James Panapa – of Hastings. For services to Māori and education.
- Teaku Petaia – of Wellington. For services to the Tokelauan community.
- Ian Herbert Pirani – of Ōmokoroa. For services to conservation.
- Mere Neehi Pirikahu – of Whanganui. For services to Māori.
- Brian David Rance – of Invercargill. For services to conservation.
- Christine Rance – of Invercargill. For services to conservation.
- Beth Richardson – of Te Awamutu. For services as a nurse and to the community.
- Ian Charles Roberts – of Palmerston North. For services to the community and education.
- Arthur Morris Robertson – of Wellington. For services to the community.
- Christine Muriel Rodda – of Christchurch. For services to netball.
- Robert Arthur Shearing – of Christchurch. For services to the intellectually disabled and the community.
- James Edward Shepherd JP – of Taranaki. For services to the community.
- Yvonne Mary Simpson – of Hokitika. For services to women.
- Dr Elizabeth Sarah Neal Sneyd – of Wellington. For services to music education.
- Lindsay John Blair Spooner – of Te Aroha. For services to the New Zealand Fire Service and the community.
- Allan Graeme Derek Spratt – of Te Puke. For services to agriculture.
- Olga Jean Stancliff – of Whakatāne. For services to music.
- Mervyn Craig Sullivan – of Christchurch. For services to rugby.
- John Gray Sutherland – of Nelson. For services to cricket.
- Herewini Selwyn Tarawa – of Taumarunui. For services to Māori.
- Ronald James Turner JP – of Wellington. For services to the community.
- Craig Michael Utting – of Wellington. For services to music education.
- Te Uru O Te Whetu Frederick Whata – of Rotorua. For services to Māori.
- Yvonne Louisa Maria Williams – of Auckland. For services to youth.
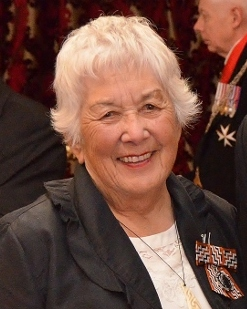
Judith Billens

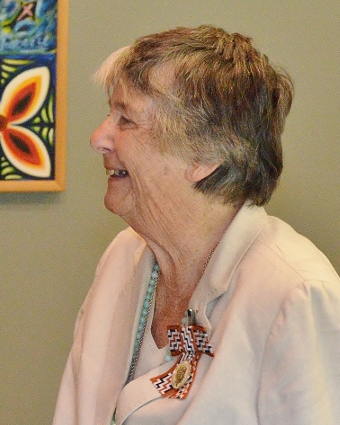
Kit Crawford

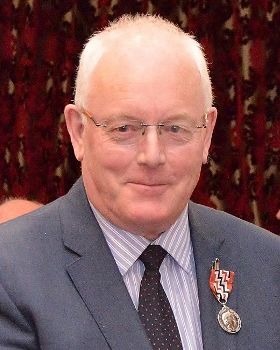
David Halstead

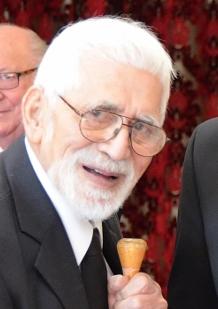
Rocky Hudson

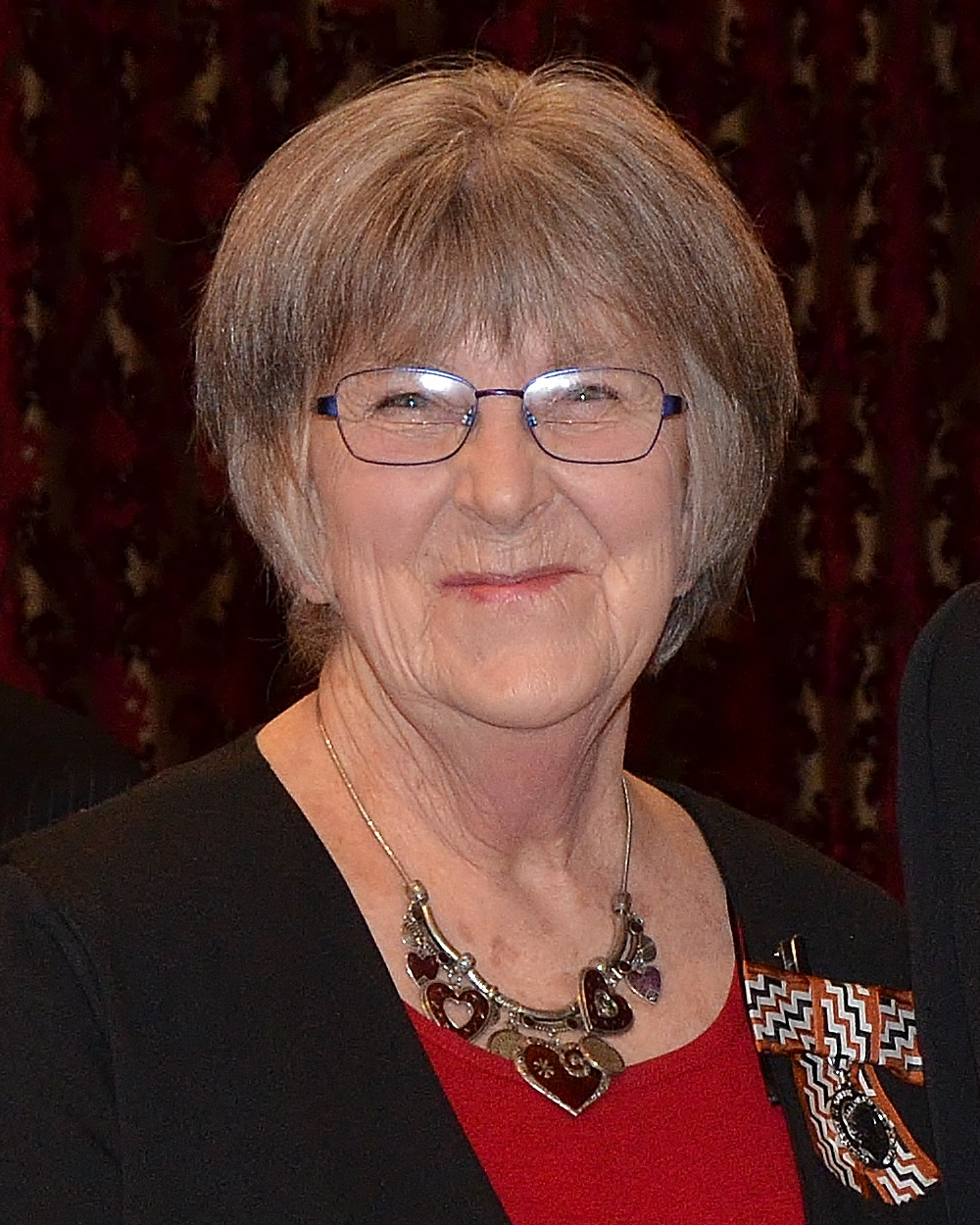
Norma McCallum

== New Zealand Distinguished Service Decoration (DSD) ==
- Captain Daniel Alexander Edginton – of Ōtaki. For services to the New Zealand Defence Force.
- Serviceman G. For services to the New Zealand Defence Force.
- Staff Sergeant Robert Victor Keith McGee – of Burnham. For services to the New Zealand Defence Force.
- Major Sean Denis Bolton – of Auckland. For services to the New Zealand Defence Force. (Note: Bolton's name was initially withheld for security reasons, being listed only as Serviceman S, but was published on 27 June 2024 in the New Zealand Gazette.)
- Lieutenant Simon Andrew Wasley – of Auckland. For services to the New Zealand Defence Force.
