= Andrew Mavis =

Canadian basketball player (born 1976)

Personal information
- Born: September 9, 1976 (age 49) Vancouver, British Columbia, Canada
- Listed height: 6 ft 6 in (1.98 m)
- Listed weight: 209 lb (95 kg)

Career information
- High school: Richmond Secondary (Richmond, British Columbia)
- College: Snow College (1994–1996); Northern Arizona (1996–1998)
- NBA draft: 1998: undrafted
- Playing career: 1998–2003
- Position: Power forward

Career history
- 1998–1999: Chester Jets
- 1999–2003: Newcastle Eagles

Career highlights
- Big Sky Player of the Year (1998); 2× First-team All-Big Sky (1997, 1998)

Andrew Spencer Mavis (born September 9, 1976) is a Canadian former professional basketball player.

Mavis played high school basketball at Richmond Secondary School, where he led the team to a second-place finish at the British Columbia AAA Tournament in his senior year.

He played college basketball for the Northern Arizona Lumberjacks, a member of the NCAA Division I's Big Sky Conference. At the end 1997–98 season Mavis was named the Big Sky Conference Player of the Year.

Mavis played for Canada at the 2000 Summer Olympics on a team that also featured future NBA Most Valuable Player Steve Nash.
