= Chief Coroner of New Zealand =

The Chief Coroner of New Zealand is the most senior coroner in New Zealand, and supervises the work of other coroners in that jurisdiction. The post was created by the passing into law of the Coroners Act 2006, and the first Chief Coroner, Neil MacLean, was named in December 2006 and took up the role in February 2007. The Coroners Act sets a statutory limit of 22 coroners; as of November 2022, there were 17 coroners based in nine centres, in addition to the Chief Coroner.

== Office holders ==
Since 2007, three people have held the position of Chief Coroner. With some of their major inquests, they are:

| | Name | Portrait | Term of office | Notable inquests | Sources |
|---|---|---|---|---|---|
| 1 | Judge Neil MacLean | | 2007–2015 | Pike River Mine disaster Christchurch earthquakes | |
| 2 | Judge Deborah Marshall | | 2015–2022 | Christchurch mosque shootings 2019 Whakaari / White Island eruption | |
| 3 | Judge Anna Tutton | | 2022–present | | |
