= Neil MacLean (coroner) =

New Zealand judge and coroner (1944–2022)

Neil MacLean QSO
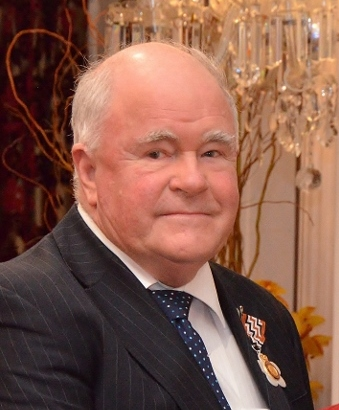
- MacLean in 2015

1st Chief Coroner of New Zealand
- In office 2007–2015
- Succeeded by: Deborah Marshall

District Court judge
- In office 1993–2014

Personal details
- Born: Allan Neil MacLean; 24 November 1944
- Died: 17 November 2022 (aged 77)
- Spouse: Susan Gordon Eliott (m. 1969)
- Children: 3
- Education: University of Canterbury
- Profession: Lawyer; judge
- Known for: Coronial inquiries into the Pike River Mine disaster and Christchurch earthquakes

Allan Neil MacLean QSO (24 November 1944 – 17 November 2022) was a New Zealand District Court judge and that country's first chief coroner, from 2007 to 2015. He was the coroner during the Pike River Mine disaster and the Christchurch earthquakes.

== Early life and family ==
Born on 24 November 1944, MacLean was the son of Donald Iain Neil MacLean, a solicitor and later magistrate, and Marjorie Parker MacLean (née Butcher). He was educated at Christchurch Boys' High School, and went on to study at the University of Canterbury, graduating with a Bachelor of Laws degree in 1967. In 1969, he married Susan Gordon Eliott, and the couple went on to have three children.

== Career ==
After completing a period of compulsory military training, MacLean worked at his father's law firm. Between 1972 and 1993, he was a partner in three different Christchurch legal practices. He was appointed as a coroner in 1978.

After his appointment as a judge of the District Court in 1993, MacLean moved to Gisborne in 1994, where he was the sole judge. He combined work as a coroner and a judge, and in 2007 he was appointed as the country's first chief coroner. During his tenure, he presided over coronial inquiries into the Pike River Mine disaster and the Christchurch earthquakes.

Following his mandatory retirement as a District Court judge at the age of 70 in 2014, MacLean was appointed an acting District Court judge for a further two-year term. He sat on the Accident Compensation Appeals Authority from 2015 to 2018, and served as a member of the Parole Board until October 2021.

MacLean died on 17 November 2022.

== Honours and awards ==
In 2012, MacLean received an honorary Doctor of Laws degree from the University of Canterbury. In the 2015 Queen's Birthday Honours, he was appointed a Companion of the New Zealand Order of Merit, for services to the judiciary.
