= Chen Ke (basketball) =

Chinese basketball player (born 1979)

Chen Ke 陈可
Personal information
- Born: 16 May 1979 (age 47) Beijing, China
- Listed height: 6.59 ft 0 in (2.01 m)

Career information
- Playing career: 1996–2010
- Position: Small forward

Career history
- 1996–2010: Bayi Rockets
Medals
Men's basketball
Representing China
Asian Games
Silver medal – second place	2002 Busan
Universiade
Silver medal – second place	2001 Beijing
FIBA Under-18 Asia Cup
Gold medal – first place	1996 Johor Bahru

Chen Ke (born 16 May 1979) is a Chinese basketball player who competed in the 2004 Summer Olympics.
