= Lisa Kersten =

New Zealand softball player

Personal information
- Born: 6 April 1976 (age 50)

Sport
- Country: New Zealand
- Sport: Softball

Lisa Kersten (born 6 April 1976) is a New Zealand softball player. She competed at the 2000 Summer Olympics in Sydney, where the New Zealand team placed sixth in the women's softball tournament.
