= Agostino Li Vecchi =

Italian basketball player (born 1970)

Personal information
- Nationality: Italian
- Born: 24 October 1970 (age 54); Cosenza, Italy

Sport
- Sport: Basketball

Agostino Li Vecchi (born 24 October 1970) is an Italian basketball player. He competed in the men's tournament at the 2000 Summer Olympics.
