= Li Qun (artist) =

Chinese artist

- 力群
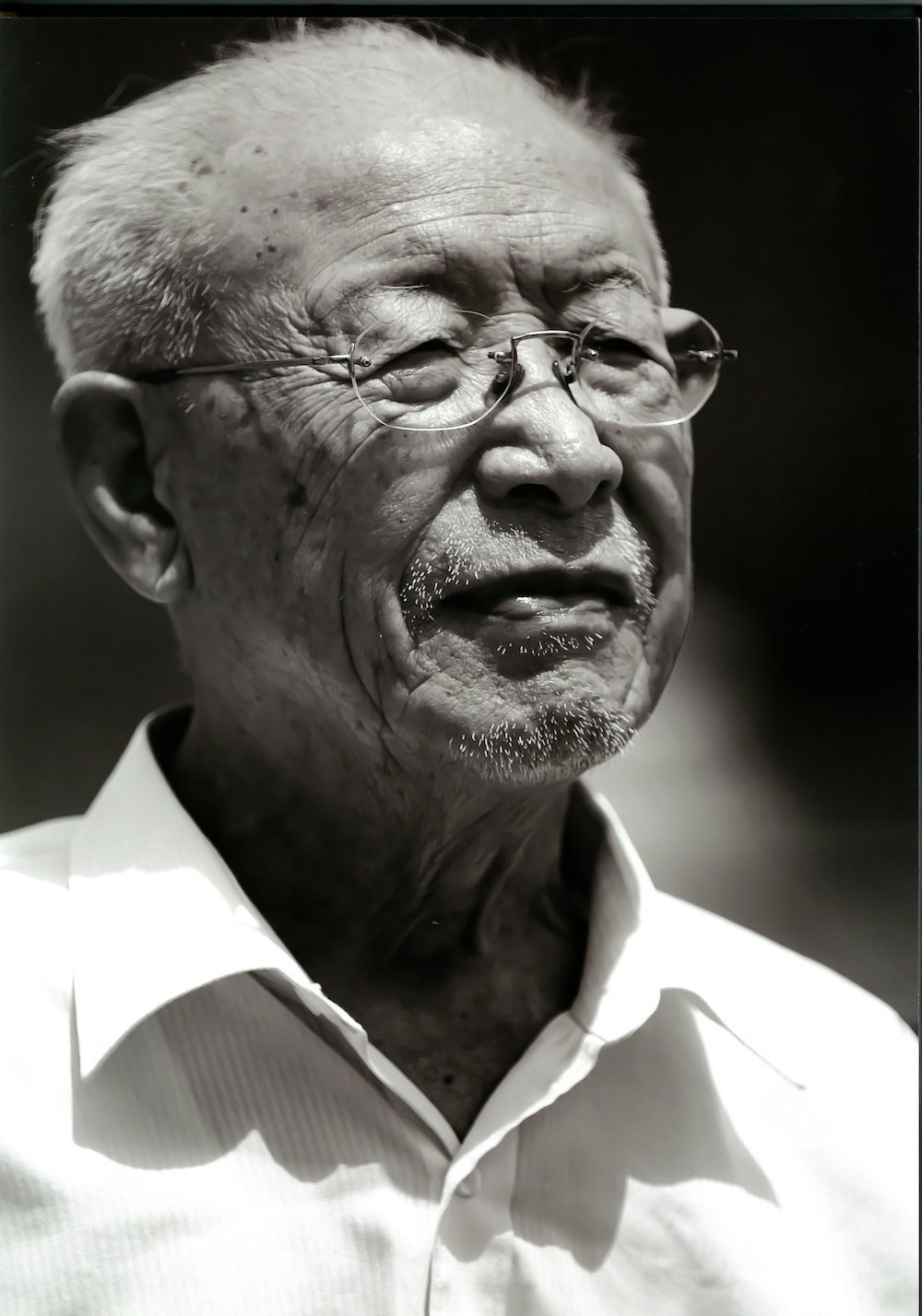
- Li Qun in 1999
- Born: Hao Lichun (郝丽春); 1912; Lingshi County, Shanxi, China
- Died: 10 February 2012 (aged 100); Chaoyang District, Beijing, China
- Resting place: An Ling Yuan Cemetery (安灵园) Changping District, Beijing, China; 40°15′19.1″N 116°24′18.5″E
- Occupation: Artist
- Known for: printmaking, Chinese ink painting, writing
- Website: liqunwoodcuts.org

Li Qun
- Chinese: 力群
Transcriptions
Standard Mandarin
- Hanyu Pinyin: Lì Qún
- IPA: [lî tɕʰy̌n]

Li Qun (Chinese: 力群; born Hao Lichun (Chinese: 郝丽春); 1912 – 10 February 2012) was a Chinese artist known for his woodcuts.

== Early life ==
A native of Lingshi County, Shanxi, Li Qun attended the Hangzhou National Art Academy and set up its Woodcut Research Association in 1933. He became acquainted with Lu Xun, who encouraged him to pursue a career in making woodcuts.

== Career ==
Portrait of Chairman Mao (1940)

Li Qun was an early member of the Committee of Shanghai Woodcut Artists, whose membership included the likes of Chen Yanqiao (陈焑桥) and Jiang Yan (姜燕). In 1940, Li Qun started teaching at the Lu Xun Academy of Art in Yan'an, Shaanxi Province. Five years later, he joined the Federation of Literature and Arts of Jin-Sui Bordering Region and was editor of the Jin-Sui People's Pictorial. He attended the inaugural National Congress of Literature and Arts in July 1949 and became a member of both the Standing Committee of China Association of Knights of the Brush and the China Federation of Literature and the Arts. He was also chairman of the Shanxi Provincial Association of Literature and Arts and editor of the Shanxi Pictorial.

In 1952, Li Qun relocated to Beijing and was employed by the People's Fine Art Publishing House. He served on the editorial team of the journal Fine Arts, while continuing to actively produce woodcuts. In his lifetime, Li Qun held some eighteen art exhibitions; most of his artworks depict life in China either before or after Communism. Described as a social realist, Li Qun was critical of Chinese expressionists whose artworks, in his view, had "returned to the ivory tower" and were "far away from life".

== Death ==
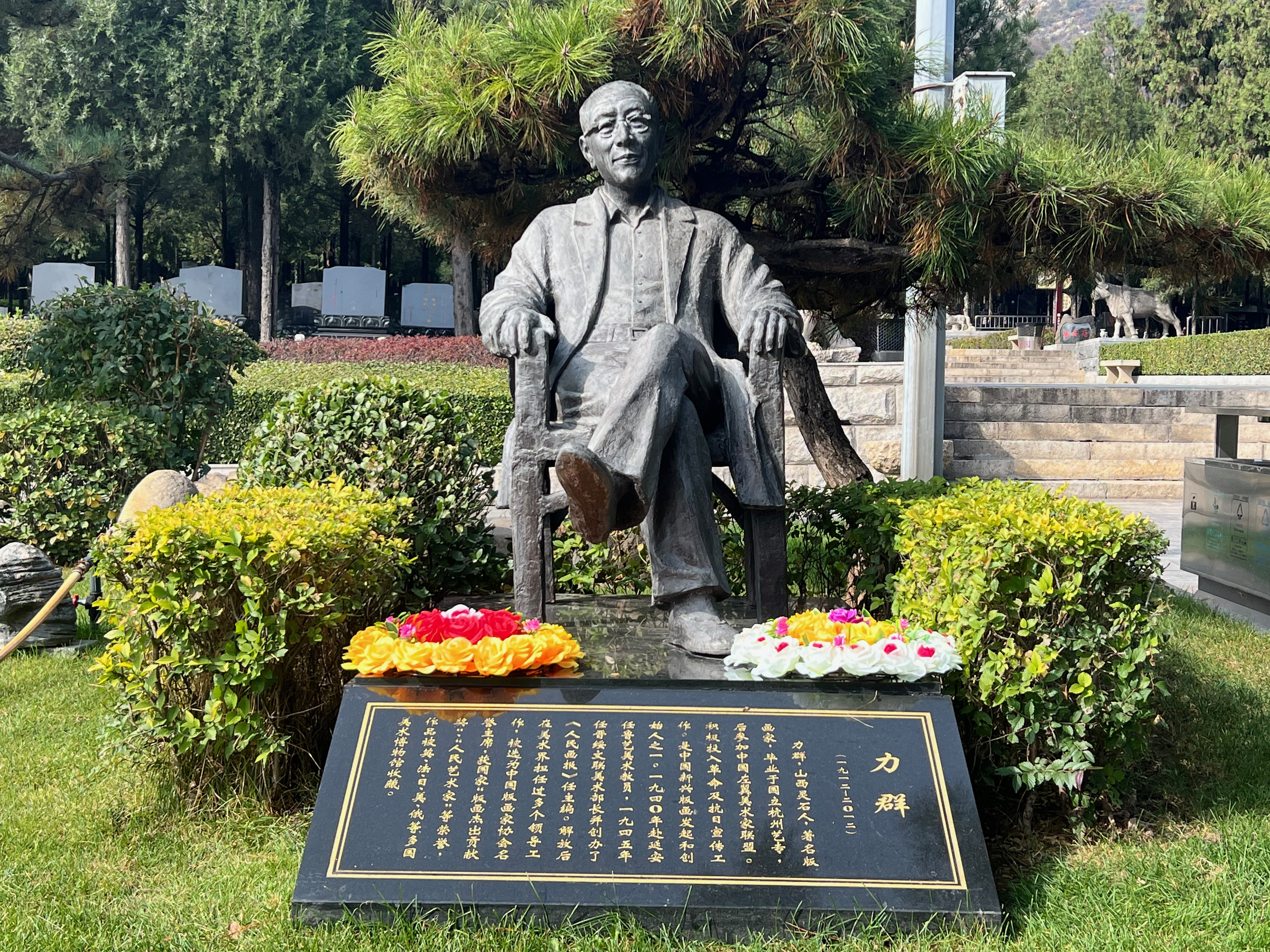
Statue of Li Qun in Taiyuan, Shanxi

Li Qun died from respiratory failure at 22:10 on 10 February 2012 at Beijing Chaoyang Hospital, at the age of 100.
