= Keith Mair =

New Zealand basketball coach and administrator

Keith Mair ONZM
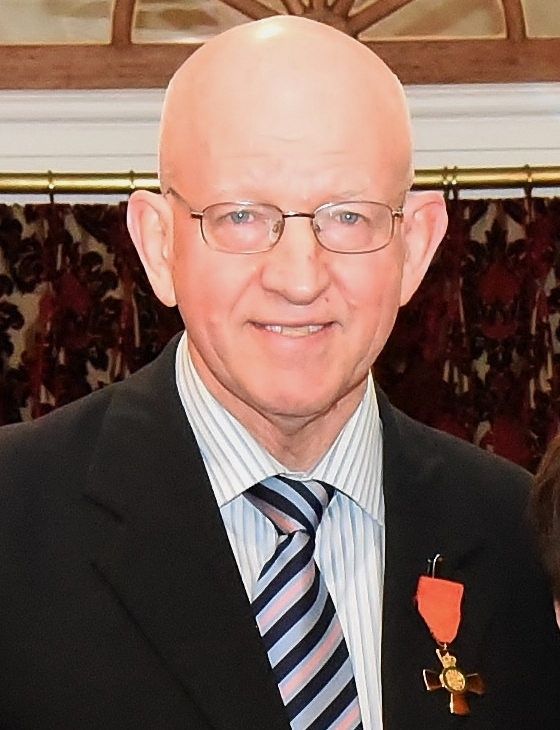
- Mair in 2017

Personal information
- Born: 1944 (age 81–82) Taumarunui, New Zealand
- Basketball career

Career history

Coaching
- 1980–1983: New Zealand under-20
- 1984–1987: New Zealand (assistant)
- 1988–2000: New Zealand
- 1989–1995: Canterbury Rams
- 1996–1997: Hawke's Bay Hawks
- 2015–?: Wales

Alexander Keith Robertson Mair ONZM is a New Zealand basketball coach and administrator. He was head coach of the New Zealand men's national basketball team from 1988 to 2000.

== Biography ==
Mair was born in Taumarunui in 1944, and grew up there. After leaving school, he studied accountancy at Victoria University of Wellington, and later became a teacher at Timaru Boys' High School. After suffering a knee injury when he was 25 years old, Mair took up basketball coaching. He coached the Timaru Boys' High School team to the national secondary schools championship title in 1981.

In 1980, Mair was appointed coach of the New Zealand under-20 team, before becoming assistant coach of the national men's side, the Tall Blacks, in 1984. He was promoted to head coach of the national team in 1988, and held the role for 13 years. During his tenure, the Tall Blacks achieved their first servies win against England in 1990, and series wins against Japan (1990 and 1994), South Korea (1996) and England (2000). He coached the Tall Blacks to win the William Jones Cup in 2000, and also took them to the 2000 Olympic Games, the first Olympics appearance by the New Zealand basketball team.

Mair coached the Canterbury Rams between 1989 and 1995, followed by two seasons as coach of the Hawke's Bay Hawks. He served 18 years as a board member of Basketball New Zealand.

Mair moved to Britain in 2003, becoming chief executive of Basketball England for the next 10 years. He was also a director of the British Basketball Federation and a member of the Finance Commission of FIBA Europe. He was appointed head coach of the Wales men's national basketball team in 2015, and is chair of Basketball Wales.

In the 2015 Queen's Birthday Honours, Mair was appointed an Officer of the New Zealand Order of Merit, for services to basketball.
