= Fiona Timu =

New Zealand softball player

Personal information
- Born: 11 December 1969 (age 56)

Sport
- Country: New Zealand
- Sport: Softball

Fiona Timu (born 11 December 1969) is a New Zealand softball player. She competed at the 2000 Summer Olympics in Sydney, where the New Zealand team placed sixth in the women's softball tournament.
