= Kiri Shaw =

New Zealand softball player

Personal information
- Born: 4 June 1973 (age 53)

Sport
- Country: New Zealand
- Sport: Softball

Kiri Shaw (born 4 June 1973) is a New Zealand softball player. She competed at the 2000 Summer Olympics in Sydney, where the New Zealand team placed sixth in the women's softball tournament.
