= Brad Riley =

New Zealand basketball player

Personal information
- Nationality: New Zealand
- Born: 2 July 1974 (age 52) Hamilton, New Zealand

Sport
- Sport: Basketball

Brad Riley (born 2 July 1974) is a New Zealand basketball player. He competed in the men's tournament at the 2000 Summer Olympics. At club level, he represented the Nelson Giants.
