= Li Qun (basketball) =

Chinese basketball coach and former player

Li Qun (Chinese: 李群; born 10 November 1973 in Harbin, Heilongjiang) is a Chinese basketball coach and former international player who competed for China men's national basketball team in the 2000 Summer Olympics. He became head coach of the Shenzhen Leopards (2015/10/31 - 2016/3/05).
