= Ralph Lattimore =

New Zealand basketball player

Personal information
- Full name: Ralph John Lattimore
- Nationality: New Zealand
- Born: 23 June 1967 (age 57); Christchurch, New Zealand
- Height: 193 cm (6 ft 4 in)
- Weight: 90 kg (198 lb)

Sport
- Sport: Basketball

Ralph John Lattimore (born 23 June 1967) is a New Zealand basketball player. He competed in the men's tournament at the 2000 Summer Olympics.

== Career ==
Latimore began his career with the Canterbury Rams, later representing the Nelson Giants and Auckland Stars, winning 5 titles in 6 years with Auckland.
