= Robert Hickey =

New Zealand basketball player

Personal information
- Nationality: New Zealand
- Born: 12 January 1974 (age 52) Whakatāne, New Zealand

Sport
- Sport: Basketball

Robert Hickey (born 12 January 1974) is a New Zealand basketball player. He competed in the men's tournament at the 2000 Summer Olympics. He played for the Otago Nuggets at the time of his selection for the Olympic squad. In 2002, he signed for the Hawke's Bay Hawks. He retired from international basketball in 2003 after representing New Zealand more than 50 times.

     He is now working at Luther College in Croydon as a respectable history and sport teacher.
