= FIVB Volleyball Women's Intercontinental Olympic Qualification Tournaments =

Women's international volleyball qualification tournament

- Most recent season or competition: 2023 FIVB Volleyball Women's Olympic Qualification Tournaments
- Sport: Volleyball
- Founded: 2018; 8 years ago
- First season: 2019
- CEO: (Brazil) Ary Graça
- No. of teams: 24
- Continent: International (FIVB)
- Website: FIVB

The FIVB Volleyball Women's Intercontinental Olympic Qualification Tournaments is a volleyball qualification tournament for the Olympic Games contested by the senior Women's national teams of the members of the Fédération Internationale de Volleyball (FIVB), the sport's global governing body.

The creation of the tournament was announced in October 2018 (alongside the announcement of the 2020 Olympic Qualification System).

A corresponding tournament for men's national teams is the FIVB Volleyball Men's Intercontinental Olympic Qualification Tournaments.

== Results summary ==
Year	Qualified teams						Teams
Year	Pool A	Pool B	Pool C	Pool D	Pool E	Pool F	Teams
2019	(Poland) Wrocław	(China) Ningbo	(United States) Bossier City	(Brazil) Belo Horizonte	(Russia) Kaliningrad	(Italy) Catania	24
2019	Serbia	China	United States	Brazil	Russia	Italy	24
2023	Pool A		Pool B		Pool C		24
2023	(China) Ningbo		(Japan) Tokyo		(Poland) Łódź		24
2023	Dominican Republic	Serbia	Turkey	Brazil	United States	Poland	24

== Appearance ==
Legend

- Rank # – Qualified for the Olympic Games
- • – Did not enter / Did not qualify
- – Hosts

Team	2019 (24)		2023 (24)		Total
Team	Pool	Rank	Pool	Rank	Total
Argentina	C	3	B	5	2
Azerbaijan	D	3	•		1
Belgium	F	3	B	6	2
Brazil	D	1	B	2	2
Bulgaria	C	2	B	7	2
Cameroon	D	4	•		1
Canada	E	3	A	3	2
China	B	1	A	4	2
Colombia	•		C	7	1
Czech Republic	B	4	A	7	2
Dominican Republic	D	2	A	1	2
Germany	B	3	C	5	2
Italy	F	1	C	3	2
Japan	•		B	3	1
Kazakhstan	C	4	•		1
Kenya	F	4	•		1
Mexico	E	4	A	8	2
Netherlands	F	2	A	5	2
Peru	•		B	8	1
Poland	A	2	C	2	2
Puerto Rico	A	4	B	4	2
Russia	E	1	DQ		1
Serbia	A	1	A	2	2
Slovenia	•		C	6	1
South Korea	E	2	C	8	2
Thailand	A	3	C	4	2
Turkey	B	2	B	1	2
Ukraine	•		A	6	1
United States	C	1	C	1	2

== See also ==
- FIVB Men's Volleyball Intercontinental Olympic Qualification Tournaments
- FIVB Women's Volleyball World Olympic Qualification Tournament
