= Volleyball at the 2024 Summer Olympics – Men's qualification =

2024 Volleyball at the Summer Olympics – Men's qualification
- Dates: 30 September 2023 – 8 October 2023
- Teams: 24 (from 5 confederations)

The men's qualification for the Olympic volleyball tournament took place between September 2023 and June 2024, allocating twelve teams for the final tournament. As the host nation and the reigning Olympic champions, France reserved a direct spot each for the men's team.

The remainder of the twelve-team field endured a dual qualification pathway to secure the quota places for Paris 2024. First, the winners and runners-up from each of the three Olympic qualification tournaments qualified directly for the Games. Second, the last five berths were attributed to the eligible NOCs based on the FIVB World Rankings in June 2024, abiding by the universality principle, that was, prioritizing those from the continents without a qualified team yet in the Paris 2024 tournament.

== Qualification summary ==
| Qualification | | Date | Venue | Berths | Qualified team |
|---|---|---|---|---|---|
| Host nation | | —N/a | | 1 | France |
| FIVB Olympic Qualification Tournaments | Pool A | 30 September – 8 October 2023 | (Brazil) Rio de Janeiro | 2 | Germany |
| FIVB Olympic Qualification Tournaments | Pool A | 30 September – 8 October 2023 | (Brazil) Rio de Janeiro | 2 | Brazil |
| FIVB Olympic Qualification Tournaments | Pool B | 30 September – 8 October 2023 | (Japan) Tokyo | 2 | United States |
| FIVB Olympic Qualification Tournaments | Pool B | 30 September – 8 October 2023 | (Japan) Tokyo | 2 | Japan |
| FIVB Olympic Qualification Tournaments | Pool C | 30 September – 8 October 2023 | (China) Xi'an | 2 | Poland |
| FIVB Olympic Qualification Tournaments | Pool C | 30 September – 8 October 2023 | (China) Xi'an | 2 | Canada |
| World Ranking qualification pathway | | 24 June 2024 | —N/a | 5 | Slovenia |
| World Ranking qualification pathway | | 24 June 2024 | —N/a | 5 | Italy |
| World Ranking qualification pathway | | 24 June 2024 | —N/a | 5 | Argentina |
| World Ranking qualification pathway | | 24 June 2024 | —N/a | 5 | Serbia |
| World Ranking qualification pathway | | 24 June 2024 | —N/a | 5 | Egypt |
| Total | | | | 12 | |

== Host country ==
FIVB reserved a berth for the 2024 Summer Olympics host country to participate in the tournament.

- France – 2020 Summer Olympic champion

== FIVB Olympic Qualification Tournament ==
As a principal route for the tournament, the winners and runners-up in each of the three qualification pools secured the quota places for Paris 2024.

=== Qualified teams ===
FIVB released the names of the twenty-four teams eligible to compete in the men's Olympic qualification tournaments for Paris 2024 through the federation's world rankings of 12 September 2022 (except France — qualified for the Games as the host nation; and Russia — ineligible because of the 2022 Russian invasion of Ukraine).

| Qualified for the Olympic Qualification Tournament |
| Qualified as hosts for the 2024 Summer Olympics |
| Ineligible for international competition |

| Seed | Team | Points |
|---|---|---|
| 1 | Poland | 389 |
| 2 | Italy | 369 |
| — | France | 368 |
| 3 | Brazil | 361 |
| — | Russia | 352 |
| 4 | United States | 333 |
| 5 | Japan | 277 |
| 6 | Argentina | 273 |
| 7 | Slovenia | 268 |
| 8 | Iran | 267 |
| 9 | Serbia | 253 |
| 10 | Cuba | 230 |
| 11 | Netherlands | 228 |
| 12 | Turkey | 200 |
| 13 | Canada | 189 |
| 14 | Ukraine | 187 |
| 15 | Germany | 184 |
| 16 | Mexico | 175 |
| 17 | Tunisia | 172 |
| 18 | Egypt | 157 |
| 19 | Belgium | 153 |
| 21 | Bulgaria | 152 |
| 22 | Finland | 152 |
| 23 | Qatar | 152 |
| 24 | China | 151 |

=== Pool draw ===
| Pool A | Pool B | Pool C |
|---|---|---|
| Brazil | Japan | China |
| Italy | United States | Poland |
| Iran | Slovenia | Argentina |
| Cuba | Serbia | Netherlands |
| Ukraine | Turkey | Canada |
| Germany | Tunisia | Mexico |
| Czech Republic | Egypt | Belgium |
| Qatar | Finland | Bulgaria |

=== Pool A (Brazil) ===
| Pos | Team | Pld | W | L | Pts | SW | SL | SR | SPW | SPL | SPR | Qualification |
|---|---|---|---|---|---|---|---|---|---|---|---|---|
| 1 | Germany | 7 | 7 | 0 | 21 | 21 | 4 | 5.250 | 611 | 493 | 1.239 | Qualified for the 2024 Olympics |
| 2 | Brazil (H) | 7 | 6 | 1 | 15 | 19 | 10 | 1.900 | 672 | 616 | 1.091 | Qualified for the 2024 Olympics |
| 3 | Cuba | 7 | 5 | 2 | 14 | 17 | 9 | 1.889 | 598 | 562 | 1.064 | |
| 4 | Italy | 7 | 4 | 3 | 13 | 16 | 10 | 1.600 | 616 | 564 | 1.092 | |
| 5 | Ukraine | 7 | 3 | 4 | 10 | 11 | 14 | 0.786 | 539 | 580 | 0.929 | |
| 6 | Czech Republic | 7 | 2 | 5 | 7 | 10 | 17 | 0.588 | 587 | 638 | 0.920 | |
| 7 | Iran | 7 | 1 | 6 | 4 | 7 | 19 | 0.368 | 545 | 617 | 0.883 | |
| 8 | Qatar | 7 | 0 | 7 | 0 | 3 | 21 | 0.143 | 507 | 605 | 0.838 | |

Source: Volleyball Olympic Qualifying Tournament – Men's standings
(H) Host

=== Pool B (Japan) ===
| Pos | Team | Pld | W | L | Pts | SW | SL | SR | SPW | SPL | SPR | Qualification |
|---|---|---|---|---|---|---|---|---|---|---|---|---|
| 1 | United States | 7 | 7 | 0 | 20 | 21 | 4 | 5.250 | 610 | 474 | 1.287 | Qualified for the 2024 Olympics |
| 2 | Japan (H) | 7 | 5 | 2 | 16 | 19 | 8 | 2.375 | 622 | 504 | 1.234 | Qualified for the 2024 Olympics |
| 3 | Slovenia | 7 | 5 | 2 | 15 | 16 | 8 | 2.000 | 566 | 532 | 1.064 | |
| 4 | Turkey | 7 | 4 | 3 | 11 | 13 | 13 | 1.000 | 605 | 599 | 1.010 | |
| 5 | Serbia | 7 | 3 | 4 | 9 | 10 | 13 | 0.769 | 496 | 517 | 0.959 | |
| 6 | Finland | 7 | 2 | 5 | 7 | 11 | 17 | 0.647 | 575 | 617 | 0.932 | |
| 7 | Egypt | 7 | 2 | 5 | 5 | 11 | 19 | 0.579 | 577 | 682 | 0.846 | |
| 8 | Tunisia | 7 | 0 | 7 | 1 | 2 | 21 | 0.095 | 425 | 551 | 0.771 | |

Source: Volleyball Olympic Qualifying Tournament – Men's standings
(H) Host

=== Pool C (China) ===
| Pos | Team | Pld | W | L | Pts | SW | SL | SR | SPW | SPL | SPR | Qualification |
|---|---|---|---|---|---|---|---|---|---|---|---|---|
| 1 | Poland | 7 | 7 | 0 | 18 | 21 | 8 | 2.625 | 682 | 603 | 1.131 | Qualified for the 2024 Olympics |
| 2 | Canada | 7 | 5 | 2 | 15 | 18 | 9 | 2.000 | 626 | 576 | 1.087 | Qualified for the 2024 Olympics |
| 3 | Argentina | 7 | 5 | 2 | 13 | 17 | 10 | 1.700 | 627 | 607 | 1.033 | |
| 4 | Belgium | 7 | 4 | 3 | 15 | 18 | 11 | 1.636 | 664 | 598 | 1.110 | |
| 5 | Bulgaria | 7 | 4 | 3 | 11 | 12 | 11 | 1.091 | 535 | 527 | 1.015 | |
| 6 | Netherlands | 7 | 2 | 5 | 6 | 9 | 17 | 0.529 | 568 | 591 | 0.961 | |
| 7 | China (H) | 7 | 1 | 6 | 6 | 10 | 18 | 0.556 | 559 | 623 | 0.897 | |
| 8 | Mexico | 7 | 0 | 7 | 0 | 0 | 21 | 0.000 | 389 | 525 | 0.741 | |

Source: Volleyball Olympic Qualifying Tournament – Men's standings
(H) Host

== World ranking qualification ==
The remaining five berths were attributed to the highest-ranked eligible NOCs based on the FIVB world rankings at the end of the 2024 FIVB Volleyball Nations League preliminary phase. Under the universality principle, the teams were selected according to the order of priority: 1) those from the continent without a qualified team; and 2) highest-ranked eligible NOCs irrespective of the continent.

| Qualified for the 2024 Summer Olympics via Olympic Qualification Tournament |
| Qualified as hosts for the 2024 Summer Olympics |
| Classifying via be the best ranked team from a continent without a qualified team in 2024 Summer Olympics (Africa) |
| Classifying via remaining spots for Top World Ranking teams not qualified via Olympic Qualification Tournament |

Top 25 rankings as of 23 June 2024
| Seed | Team | Points |
|---|---|---|
| 1 | Poland | 424.50 |
| 2 | Japan | 354.75 |
| 3 | Slovenia | 354.46 |
| 4 | Italy | 352.33 |
| 5 | United States | 325.89 |
| 6 | Brazil | 318.52 |
| 7 | France | 317.34 |
| 8 | Argentina | 298.34 |
| 9 | Canada | 279.67 |
| 10 | Serbia | 259.97 |
| 11 | Germany | 250.28 |
| 12 | Cuba | 249.34 |
| 13 | Netherlands | 204.81 |
| 14 | Ukraine | 200.61 |
| 15 | Iran | 185.07 |
| 16 | Belgium | 180.15 |
| 17 | Turkey | 179.58 |
| 18 | Czech Republic | 165.11 |
| 19 | Egypt | 164.05 |
| 20 | Bulgaria | 161.06 |
| 21 | Qatar | 153.67 |
| 22 | Croatia | 148.48 |
| 23 | Portugal | 147.16 |
| 24 | Finland | 146.72 |
| 25 | Tunisia | 145.09 |

== See also ==
- Volleyball at the 2024 Summer Olympics – Women's qualification
- 2024 FIVB Men's Volleyball Nations League
