= 2023 FIVB Volleyball Men's Olympic Qualification Tournaments =

Pré-Olímpico Masculino 2023; FIVBパリ五輪予選/ワールドカップバレー2023; 2023年男排奥运会资格赛
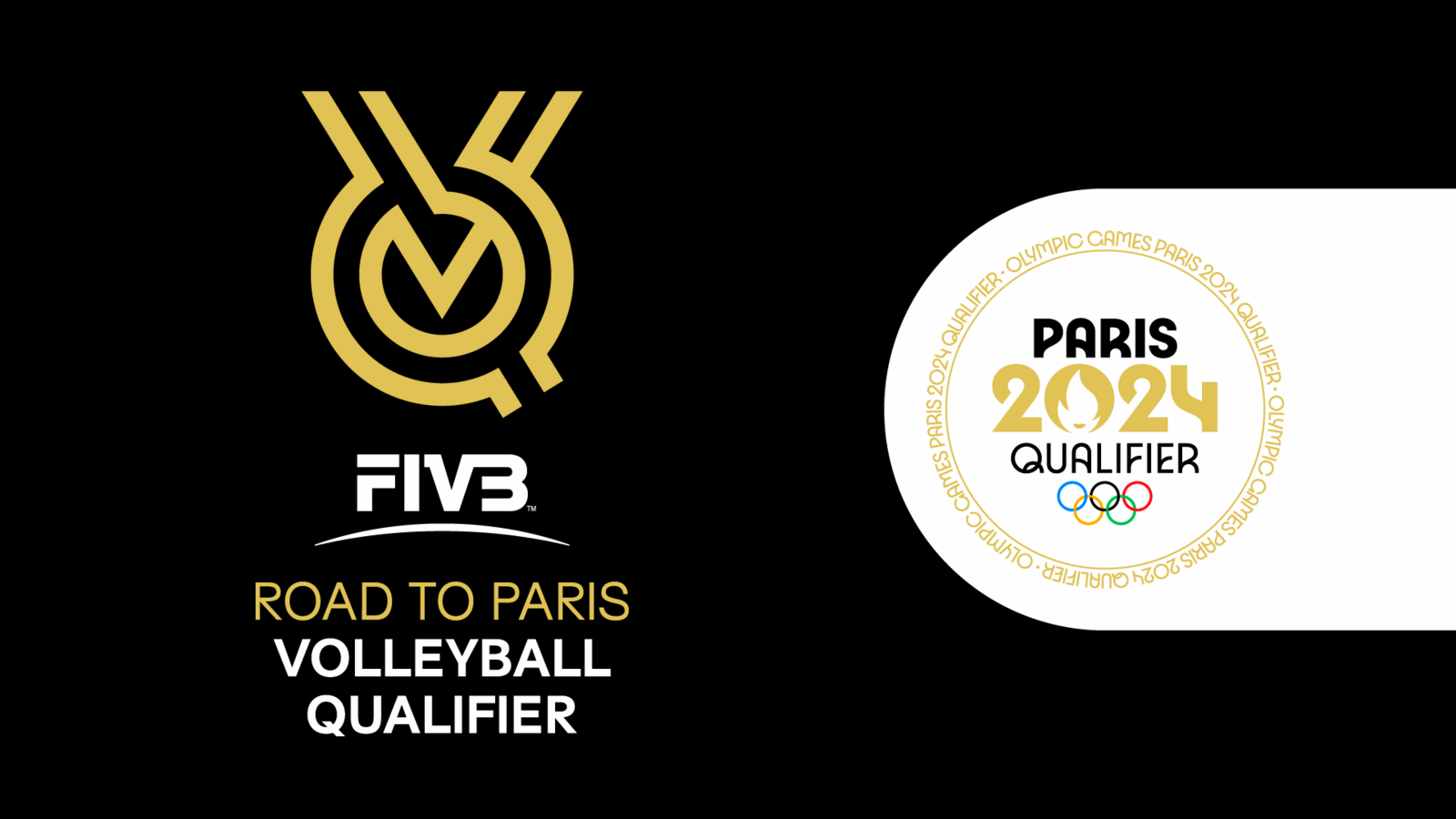
- Official logo

Tournament details
- Host countries: Brazil; Japan; China
- Cities: Rio de Janeiro; Tokyo; Xi'an
- Dates: 30 September – 8 October
- Teams: 24
- Venue: 3 (in 3 host cities)

Tournament statistics
- Matches played: 84
- Attendance: 263,079 (3,132 per match)

The 2023 FIVB Volleyball Men's Olympic Qualification Tournaments, alternatively the 2023 Volleyball Men's World Cup (for the tournament held in Japan) and also known as FIVB Road to Paris Volleyball Qualifier, were the three volleyball tournaments contested by 24 men's national teams of the Fédération Internationale de Volleyball (FIVB), where the top two teams in each pool earned a place in the 2024 Summer Olympics.

== Hosts selection ==
On 16 October 2022, FIVB announced that Japan will host one of three tournaments for both men's and women's Olympic Qualification Tournaments (OQTs). The men's and women's OQTs held in Japan are traditionally known as World Cup in Japan. Later, on 8 March 2023, FIVB confirmed that Brazil and China will host the remaining two tournaments for men's OQTs. China would also host the women's OQTs.

== Qualification ==
The FIVB Olympic Qualification Tournaments (OQTs) included the 24 best-placed non-qualified teams (except Russia who was ineligible to compete in the OQTs due to the 2022 Russian invasion of Ukraine) from the FIVB World Rankings as of 12 September 2022.

Country	Confederation	Qualified as	Previous appearances			Previous best performance
Country	Confederation	Qualified as	Total	First	Last	Previous best performance
Poland	CEV	1st World ranked non-qualified team	1	2019	2019	Qualified (2019)
Italy	CEV	2nd World ranked non-qualified team	1	2019	2019	Qualified (2019)
Brazil	CSV	4th World ranked non-qualified team	1	2019	2019	Qualified (2019)
United States	NORCECA	6th World ranked non-qualified team	1	2019	2019	Qualified (2019)
Japan	AVC	7th World ranked non-qualified team	0	None		None
Argentina	CSV	8th World ranked non-qualified team	1	2019	2019	Qualified (2019)
Slovenia	CEV	9th World ranked non-qualified team	1	2019	2019	13th place (2019)
Iran	AVC	10th World ranked non-qualified team	1	2019	2019	7th place (2019)
Serbia	CEV	11th World ranked non-qualified team	1	2019	2019	7th place (2019)
Cuba	NORCECA	12th World ranked non-qualified team	1	2019	2019	13th place (2019)
Netherlands	CEV	13th World ranked non-qualified team	1	2019	2019	7th place (2019)
Turkey	CEV	14th World ranked non-qualified team	0	None		None
Canada	NORCECA	15th World ranked non-qualified team	1	2019	2019	7th place (2019)
Ukraine	CEV	16th World ranked non-qualified team	0	None		None
Germany	CEV	17th World ranked non-qualified team	0	None		None
Mexico	NORCECA	18th World ranked non-qualified team	1	2019	2019	19th place (2019)
Tunisia	CAVB	19th World ranked non-qualified team	1	2019	2019	19th place (2019)
Egypt	CAVB	20th World ranked non-qualified team	1	2019	2019	13th place (2019)
Belgium	CEV	21st World ranked non-qualified team	1	2019	2019	13th place (2019)
Czech Republic	CEV	22nd World ranked non-qualified team	0	None		None
Bulgaria	CEV	23rd World ranked non-qualified team	1	2019	2019	7th place (2019)
Finland	CEV	24th World ranked non-qualified team	1	2019	2019	19th place (2019)
Qatar	AVC	25th World ranked non-qualified team	0	None		None
China	AVC	26th World ranked non-qualified team	1	2019	2019	13th place (2019)

== Pools composition ==
According to the qualification system, the twenty-four teams were placed into three pools of eight teams. For the first position of each pool, FIVB reserved the right to the three hosts with the top-ranked hosted team allocated to pool A, the middle-ranked hosted team allocated to pool B, and the last-ranked hosted team allocated to pool C. The remaining twenty-one teams were allocated into seven pots of three teams based on the FIVB Men's World Rankings of 1 January 2023. The order of drawing was applied with the serpentine system. The teams for the even-number position (Pot 1, Pot 3, Pot 5, Pot 7) were drawn and then placed starting from pool C to pool A. The teams for the odd-number position (Pot 2, Pot 4, Pot 6) were drawn and then placed starting from pool A to pool C.

The drawing of lots ceremony was held at the FIVB headquarters "Château Les Tourelles" in Lausanne, Switzerland, on 17 March 2023, 13:00 CET.

Hosts	Pot 1	Pot 2	Pot 3
Brazil (4); Japan (7); China (26)	Poland (1); Italy (2); United States (6)	Argentina (8); Slovenia (9); Iran (10)	Serbia (11); Cuba (12); Netherlands (13)

Pot 4	Pot 5	Pot 6	Pot 7
Turkey (14); Canada (15); Ukraine (16)	Germany (17); Mexico (18); Tunisia (19)	Egypt (20); Belgium (21); Czech Republic (22)	Bulgaria (23); Finland (24); Qatar (25)

Final draw

Pool A	Pool B	Pool C
Brazil	Japan	China
Italy	United States	Poland
Iran	Slovenia	Argentina
Cuba	Serbia	Netherlands
Ukraine	Turkey	Canada
Germany	Tunisia	Mexico
Czech Republic	Egypt	Belgium
Qatar	Finland	Bulgaria

== Venues ==
Pool A	Pool B	Pool C
Rio de Janeiro, Brazil	Tokyo, Japan	Xi'an, China
Ginásio do Maracanãzinho	Yoyogi National Gymnasium	Qujiang Sports Complex
Capacity: 11,800	Capacity: 13,291	Capacity: 10,000

== Pool standing procedure ==
1. Total number of victories (matches won, matches lost)
2. In the event of a tie, the following first tiebreaker will apply: The teams will be ranked by the most point gained per match as follows:
  - Match won 3–0 or 3–1: 3 points for the winner, 0 points for the loser
  - Match won 3–2: 2 points for the winner, 1 point for the loser
  - Match forfeited: 3 points for the winner, 0 points (0–25, 0–25, 0–25) for the loser
3. If teams are still tied after examining the number of victories and points gained, then the FIVB will examine the results in order to break the tie in the following order:
  - Set quotient: if two or more teams are tied on the number of points gained, they will be ranked by the quotient resulting from the division of the number of all set won by the number of all sets lost.
  - Points quotient: if the tie persists based on the set quotient, the teams will be ranked by the quotient resulting from the division of all points scored by the total of points lost during all sets.
  - If the tie persists based on the point quotient, the tie will be broken based on the team that won the match of the Round Robin Phase between the tied teams. When the tie in point quotient is between three or more teams, these teams ranked taking into consideration only the matches involving the teams in question.

== Result ==
=== Pool A (Rio de Janeiro, Brazil) ===
- All times are Brasília Time (UTC−03:00).
- The top two teams in this pool qualify for the 2024 Summer Olympics volleyball tournament.

Pos	Team	Pld	W	L	Pts	SW	SL	SR	SPW	SPL	SPR	Qualification
1	Germany	7	7	0	21	21	4	5.250	611	493	1.239	Qualified for the 2024 Olympics
2	Brazil (H)	7	6	1	15	19	10	1.900	672	616	1.091	Qualified for the 2024 Olympics
3	Cuba	7	5	2	14	17	9	1.889	598	562	1.064	
4	Italy	7	4	3	13	16	10	1.600	616	564	1.092	
5	Ukraine	7	3	4	10	11	14	0.786	539	580	0.929	
6	Czech Republic	7	2	5	7	10	17	0.588	587	638	0.920	
7	Iran	7	1	6	4	7	19	0.368	545	617	0.883	
8	Qatar	7	0	7	0	3	21	0.143	507	605	0.838	

Source: Volleyball Olympic Qualifying Tournament – Men's standings
(H) Host

Date	Time		Score		Set 1	Set 2	Set 3	Set 4	Set 5	Total	Report
30 Sep	10:00	Brazil	3–0	Qatar	25–16	25–19	26–24			76–59	P2 Report
30 Sep	13:30	Italy	3–1	Czech Republic	24–26	25–18	25–22	25–19		99–85	P2 Report
30 Sep	17:00	Iran	1–3	Germany	22–25	25–22	16–25	21–25		84–97	P2 Report
30 Sep	20:30	Cuba	3–0	Ukraine	25–16	25–19	25–18			75–53	P2 Report
1 Oct	10:00	Brazil	3–2	Czech Republic	22–25	25–16	25–20	21–25	16–14	109–100	P2 Report
1 Oct	13:30	Cuba	1–3	Germany	25–21	14–25	22–25	15–25		76–96	P2 Report
1 Oct	17:00	Italy	3–0	Qatar	25–19	25–20	25–19			75–58	P2 Report
1 Oct	20:30	Iran	0–3	Ukraine	19–25	22–25	17–25			58–75	P2 Report
3 Oct	10:00	Iran	3–1	Qatar	25–23	23–25	25–17	25–23		98–88	P2 Report
3 Oct	13:30	Cuba	3–0	Czech Republic	26–24	25–21	25–21			76–66	P2 Report
3 Oct	17:00	Italy	3–0	Ukraine	25–23	25–16	25–16			75–55	P2 Report
3 Oct	20:30	Brazil	1–3	Germany	25–21	19–25	19–25	26–28		89–99	P2 Report
4 Oct	10:00	Iran	1–3	Czech Republic	17–25	22–25	25–21	20–25		84–96	P2 Report
4 Oct	13:30	Italy	1–3	Germany	24–26	25–18	20–25	23–25		92–94	P2 Report
4 Oct	17:00	Cuba	3–0	Qatar	25–21	25–21	25–16			75–58	P2 Report
4 Oct	20:30	Brazil	3–2	Ukraine	36–38	25–20	21–25	25–18	15–11	122–112	P2 Report
6 Oct	10:00	Brazil	3–1	Cuba	23–25	25–18	25–20	25–20		98–83	P2 Report
6 Oct	13:30	Italy	3–0	Iran	25–22	25–22	25–23			75–67	P2 Report
6 Oct	17:00	Ukraine	3–1	Qatar	25–22	27–29	26–24	25–21		103–96	P2 Report
6 Oct	20:30	Germany	3–0	Czech Republic	25–23	25–18	25–17			75–58	P2 Report
7 Oct	10:00	Brazil	3–0	Iran	25–19	25–20	25–23			75–62	P2 Report
7 Oct	13:30	Italy	1–3	Cuba	22–25	25–21	25–27	27–29		99–102	P2 Report
7 Oct	17:00	Ukraine	3–1	Czech Republic	25–19	25–15	23–25	25–20		98–79	P2 Report
7 Oct	20:30	Germany	3–0	Qatar	25–15	25–20	25–16			75–51	P2 Report
8 Oct	10:00	Brazil	3–2	Italy	25–23	23–25	15–25	25–17	15–11	103–101	P2 Report
8 Oct	13:30	Iran	2–3	Cuba	20–25	25–23	25–23	13–25	9–15	92–111	P2 Report
8 Oct	17:00	Ukraine	0–3	Germany	17–25	12–25	14–25			43–75	P2 Report
8 Oct	20:30	Czech Republic	3–1	Qatar	25–27	28–26	25–23	25–21		103–97	P2 Report

=== Pool B (Tokyo, Japan) ===
- All times are Japan Standard Time (UTC+09:00).
- The top two teams in this pool qualify for the 2024 Summer Olympics volleyball tournament.
- The top team in this pool reigns over the 2023 Volleyball Men's World Cup.

Pos	Team	Pld	W	L	Pts	SW	SL	SR	SPW	SPL	SPR	Qualification
1	United States	7	7	0	20	21	4	5.250	610	474	1.287	Qualified for the 2024 Olympics
2	Japan (H)	7	5	2	16	19	8	2.375	622	504	1.234	Qualified for the 2024 Olympics
3	Slovenia	7	5	2	15	16	8	2.000	566	532	1.064	
4	Turkey	7	4	3	11	13	13	1.000	605	599	1.010	
5	Serbia	7	3	4	9	10	13	0.769	496	517	0.959	
6	Finland	7	2	5	7	11	17	0.647	575	617	0.932	
7	Egypt	7	2	5	5	11	19	0.579	577	682	0.846	
8	Tunisia	7	0	7	1	2	21	0.095	425	551	0.771	

Source: Volleyball Olympic Qualifying Tournament – Men's standings
(H) Host

Date	Time		Score		Set 1	Set 2	Set 3	Set 4	Set 5	Total	Report
30 Sep	10:00	Slovenia	3–0	Tunisia	25–20	25–18	25–21			75–59	P2 Report
30 Sep	13:00	Serbia	1–3	Turkey	22–25	25–20	14–25	20–25		81–95	P2 Report
30 Sep	16:00	United States	3–0	Egypt	25–20	25–16	25–19			75–55	P2 Report
30 Sep	19:25	Japan	3–2	Finland	25–17	25–15	25–27	19–25	15–12	109–96	P2 Report
1 Oct	10:00	Slovenia	3–0	Turkey	28–26	30–28	25–22			83–76	P2 Report
1 Oct	13:00	Serbia	3–0	Tunisia	25–21	25–16	25–21			75–58	P2 Report
1 Oct	16:00	United States	3–0	Finland	25–17	25–15	25–17			75–49	P2 Report
1 Oct	19:25	Japan	2–3	Egypt	25–14	25–10	23–25	23–25	13–15	109–89	P2 Report
3 Oct	10:00	Slovenia	3–1	Finland	25–19	18–25	25–20	25–18		93–82	P2 Report
3 Oct	13:00	Serbia	3–1	Egypt	18–25	25–19	25–14	25–16		93–74	P2 Report
3 Oct	16:00	United States	3–1	Turkey	25–17	26–28	32–30	25–20		108–95	P2 Report
3 Oct	19:25	Japan	3–0	Tunisia	25–14	25–16	25–15			75–45	P2 Report
4 Oct	10:00	Slovenia	3–1	Egypt	23–25	25–22	25–17	25–14		98–78	P2 Report
4 Oct	13:00	Serbia	3–0	Finland	25–21	25–22	25–22			75–65	P2 Report
4 Oct	16:00	United States	3–0	Tunisia	25–11	25–12	25–14			75–37	P2 Report
4 Oct	19:25	Japan	3–0	Turkey	25–15	25–20	25–19			75–54	P2 Report
6 Oct	10:00	Turkey	3–2	Finland	25–22	25–23	23–25	23–25	15–8	111–103	P2 Report
6 Oct	13:00	Tunisia	2–3	Egypt	25–15	25–13	21–25	27–29	9–15	107–97	P2 Report
6 Oct	16:00	United States	3–1	Slovenia	25–18	21–25	25–20	25–18		96–81	P2 Report
6 Oct	19:25	Japan	3–0	Serbia	25–17	25–14	25–22			75–53	P2 Report
7 Oct	10:00	Turkey	3–1	Egypt	25–21	25–18	20–25	25–23		95–87	P2 Report
7 Oct	13:00	Tunisia	0–3	Finland	19–25	23–25	15–25			57–75	P2 Report
7 Oct	16:00	United States	3–0	Serbia	25–18	25–18	25–17			75–53	P2 Report
7 Oct	19:25	Japan	3–0	Slovenia	25–21	25–22	25–18			75–61	P2 Report
8 Oct	10:00	Egypt	2–3	Finland	12–25	25–20	25–20	22–25	13–15	97–105	P2 Report
8 Oct	13:00	Turkey	3–0	Tunisia	25–13	25–22	29–27			79–62	P2 Report
8 Oct	16:00	Slovenia	3–0	Serbia	25–22	25–23	25–21			75–66	P2 Report
8 Oct	19:25	Japan	2–3	United States	19–25	25–22	25–19	23–25	12–15	104–106	P2 Report

=== Pool C (Xi'an, China) ===
- All times are China Standard Time (UTC+08:00).
- The top two teams in this pool qualify for the 2024 Summer Olympics volleyball tournament.

Pos	Team	Pld	W	L	Pts	SW	SL	SR	SPW	SPL	SPR	Qualification
1	Poland	7	7	0	18	21	8	2.625	682	603	1.131	Qualified for the 2024 Olympics
2	Canada	7	5	2	15	18	9	2.000	626	576	1.087	Qualified for the 2024 Olympics
3	Argentina	7	5	2	13	17	10	1.700	627	607	1.033	
4	Belgium	7	4	3	15	18	11	1.636	664	598	1.110	
5	Bulgaria	7	4	3	11	12	11	1.091	535	527	1.015	
6	Netherlands	7	2	5	6	9	17	0.529	568	591	0.961	
7	China (H)	7	1	6	6	10	18	0.556	559	623	0.897	
8	Mexico	7	0	7	0	0	21	0.000	389	525	0.741	

Source: Volleyball Olympic Qualifying Tournament – Men's standings
(H) Host

Date	Time		Score		Set 1	Set 2	Set 3	Set 4	Set 5	Total	Report
30 Sep	10:00	Argentina	3–0	Mexico	25–20	25–17	25–19			75–56	P2 Report
30 Sep	13:00	Netherlands	2–3	Canada	21–25	25–23	26–24	18–25	12–15	102–112	P2 Report
30 Sep	16:00	Poland	3–2	Belgium	23–25	25–20	25–16	21–25	17–15	111–101	P2 Report
30 Sep	19:30	China	0–3	Bulgaria	18–25	19–25	14–25			51–75	P2 Report
1 Oct	10:00	Argentina	1–3	Canada	25–27	22–25	25–23	15–25		87–100	P2 Report
1 Oct	13:00	Netherlands	3–0	Mexico	25–19	25–19	25–16			75–54	P2 Report
1 Oct	16:00	Poland	3–0	Bulgaria	26–24	25–20	25–21			76–65	P2 Report
1 Oct	19:30	China	1–3	Belgium	18–25	25–22	19–25	17–25		79–97	P2 Report
3 Oct	10:00	Argentina	3–0	Bulgaria	27–25	25–21	31–29			83–75	P2 Report
3 Oct	13:00	Netherlands	0–3	Belgium	22–25	19–25	15–25			56–75	P2 Report
3 Oct	16:00	Poland	3–2	Canada	21–25	25–20	25–20	20–25	17–15	108–105	P2 Report
3 Oct	19:30	China	3–0	Mexico	25–21	25–9	25–19			75–49	P2 Report
4 Oct	10:00	Netherlands	0–3	Bulgaria	23–25	21–25	28–30			72–80	P2 Report
4 Oct	13:00	Argentina	3–2	Belgium	25–22	25–23	18–25	21–25	15–13	104–108	P2 Report
4 Oct	16:00	Poland	3–0	Mexico	25–21	25–19	25–14			75–54	P2 Report
4 Oct	19:30	China	0–3	Canada	19–25	22–25	24–26			65–76	P2 Report
6 Oct	10:00	Canada	3–0	Bulgaria	25–21	25–17	25–18			75–56	P2 Report
6 Oct	13:00	Mexico	0–3	Belgium	18–25	21–25	17–25			56–75	P2 Report
6 Oct	16:00	Poland	3–1	Argentina	25–23	23–25	28–26	25–20		101–94	P2 Report
6 Oct	19:30	China	2–3	Netherlands	25–22	16–25	16–25	25–21	11–15	93–108	P2 Report
7 Oct	10:00	Canada	1–3	Belgium	14–25	25–22	28–30	16–25		83–102	P2 Report
7 Oct	13:00	Mexico	0–3	Bulgaria	23–25	19–25	22–25			64–75	P2 Report
7 Oct	16:00	Poland	3–1	Netherlands	21–25	25–17	25–22	29–27		100–91	P2 Report
7 Oct	19:30	China	2–3	Argentina	25–22	22–25	19–25	25–20	12–15	103–107	P2 Report
8 Oct	10:00	Belgium	2–3	Bulgaria	21–25	25–23	25–21	22–25	13–15	106–109	P2Report
8 Oct	13:00	Argentina	3–0	Netherlands	25–17	27–25	25–22			77–64	P2 Report
8 Oct	16:00	Canada	3–0	Mexico	25–20	25–21	25–15			75–56	P2 Report
8 Oct	19:30	China	2–3	Poland	20–25	25–23	25–22	9–25	14–16	93–111	P2 Report

== Qualifying teams for the Summer Olympics ==
Team	Qualified on	Previous appearances in the Summer Olympics (Note: Bold indicates champions for that year. Italic indicates hosts for that year.)
United States	7 October 2023	12 (1964, 1968, **1984**, **1988**, 1992, 1996, 2000, 2004, **2008**, 2012, 2016, 2020)
Poland	7 October 2023	10 (1968, 1972, **1976**, 1980, 1996, 2004, 2008, 2012, 2016, 2020)
Japan	7 October 2023	9 (1964, 1968, **1972**, 1976, 1984, 1988, 1992, 2008, 2020)
Germany	7 October 2023	4 (1968, 1972, 2008, 2012)
Canada	8 October 2023	5 (1976, 1984, 1992, 2016, 2020)
Brazil	8 October 2023	15 (1964, 1968, 1972, 1976, 1980, 1984, 1988, **1992**, 1996, 2000, **2004**, 2008, 2012, **2016**, 2020)

== See also ==
- 2023 FIVB Volleyball Women's Olympic Qualification Tournaments
