= Volleyball at the 2024 Summer Olympics – Women's qualification =

The women's qualification for the Olympic volleyball tournament occurred between September 2023 and June 2024, allocating twelve teams for the final tournament. As the host nation, France reserved a direct spot each for the women's team, marking the country's maiden participation in the Olympic tournament.

The remainder of the twelve-team field had to endure a dual qualification pathway to secure the quota places for Paris 2024. First, the winners and runners-up from each of the three Olympic qualification tournaments qualified directly for the Games. Second, the last five berths were attributed to the eligible National Olympic Committees (NOCs) based on the FIVB world rankings by June 2024, abiding by the universality principle, that was, prioritizing those from the continents without a qualified team yet in the Paris 2024 tournament.

== Qualification summary ==
Qualification		Date	Venue	Berths	Qualified team
Host nation		—N/a		1	France
FIVB Olympic Qualification Tournaments	Pool A	16–24 September 2023	(China) Ningbo	2	Dominican Republic
FIVB Olympic Qualification Tournaments	Pool A	16–24 September 2023	(China) Ningbo	2	Serbia
FIVB Olympic Qualification Tournaments	Pool B	16–24 September 2023	(Japan) Tokyo	2	Turkey
FIVB Olympic Qualification Tournaments	Pool B	16–24 September 2023	(Japan) Tokyo	2	Brazil
FIVB Olympic Qualification Tournaments	Pool C	16–24 September 2023	(Poland) Łódź	2	United States
FIVB Olympic Qualification Tournaments	Pool C	16–24 September 2023	(Poland) Łódź	2	Poland
World Ranking qualification pathway		17 June 2024	—N/a	5	Italy
World Ranking qualification pathway		17 June 2024	—N/a	5	China
World Ranking qualification pathway		17 June 2024	—N/a	5	Japan
World Ranking qualification pathway		17 June 2024	—N/a	5	Netherlands
World Ranking qualification pathway		17 June 2024	—N/a	5	Kenya
Total				12	

== Host country ==
FIVB reserved a berth for the 2024 Summer Olympics host country to participate in the tournament.

- France

== FIVB Olympic Qualification Tournament ==
As a principal route for the tournament, the winners and runners-up in each of the three qualification pools secured the quota places for Paris 2024.

=== Qualified teams ===
FIVB released the names of the twenty-four teams eligible to compete in the women's Olympic qualification tournaments for Paris 2024 through the federation's world rankings of 12 September 2022 (except France — qualified for the Games as the host nation; and Russia — ineligible because of the country's invasion of Ukraine).

Qualified for the Olympic Qualification Tournament
Qualified as hosts for the 2024 Summer Olympics
Ineligible for international competition

Seed	Team	Points
1	Serbia	393
2	Italy	391
3	Brazil	381
4	United States	354
5	China	338
6	Japan	316
7	Turkey	299
—	Russia	278
8	Dominican Republic	262
9	Poland	252
10	Belgium	244
11	Netherlands	243
12	Germany	219
13	Canada	210
14	Thailand	207
15	Bulgaria	193
16	Puerto Rico	177
17	Czech Republic	164
18	Colombia	163
19	Mexico	160
—	France	159
20	Argentina	150
21	South Korea	149
22	Ukraine	148
23	Slovenia	140
24	Peru	136

=== Pool draw ===
Pool A	Pool B	Pool C
China	Japan	Poland
Serbia	Brazil	Italy
Dominican Republic	Turkey	United States
Netherlands	Belgium	Germany
Canada	Bulgaria	Thailand
Czech Republic	Puerto Rico	Colombia
Mexico	Argentina	South Korea
Ukraine	Peru	Slovenia

=== Pool A (China) ===
Pos	Team	Pld	W	L	Pts	SW	SL	SR	SPW	SPL	SPR	Qualification
1	Dominican Republic	7	6	1	17	20	9	2.222	670	597	1.122	Qualified for the 2024 Olympics
2	Serbia	7	5	2	15	17	7	2.429	576	507	1.136	Qualified for the 2024 Olympics
3	Canada	7	5	2	14	17	11	1.545	615	600	1.025	
4	China (H)	7	4	3	14	17	10	1.700	620	544	1.140	
5	Netherlands	7	4	3	13	16	11	1.455	599	561	1.068	
6	Ukraine	7	2	5	6	7	17	0.412	493	563	0.876	
7	Czech Republic	7	2	5	5	8	18	0.444	545	610	0.893	
8	Mexico	7	0	7	0	2	21	0.095	435	571	0.762	

Source: Volleyball Olympic Qualifying Tournament – Women's standings
(H) Host

=== Pool B (Japan) ===
Pos	Team	Pld	W	L	Pts	SW	SL	SR	SPW	SPL	SPR	Qualification
1	Turkey	7	7	0	21	21	3	7.000	603	468	1.288	Qualified for the 2024 Olympics
2	Brazil	7	6	1	16	18	7	2.571	585	479	1.221	Qualified for the 2024 Olympics
3	Japan (H)	7	5	2	16	18	6	3.000	567	463	1.225	
4	Puerto Rico	7	4	3	11	12	13	0.923	529	552	0.958	
5	Argentina	7	3	4	8	12	16	0.750	565	608	0.929	
6	Belgium	7	2	5	6	7	15	0.467	461	508	0.907	
7	Bulgaria	7	1	6	5	8	18	0.444	502	583	0.861	
8	Peru	7	0	7	1	3	21	0.143	424	575	0.737	

Source: Volleyball Olympic Qualifying Tournament – Women's standings
(H) Host

=== Pool C (Poland) ===
Pos	Team	Pld	W	L	Pts	SW	SL	SR	SPW	SPL	SPR	Qualification
1	United States	7	6	1	18	19	7	2.714	626	474	1.321	Qualified for the 2024 Olympics
2	Poland (H)	7	6	1	18	20	8	2.500	644	573	1.124	Qualified for the 2024 Olympics
3	Italy	7	5	2	15	17	7	2.429	572	480	1.192	
4	Thailand	7	4	3	11	13	12	1.083	538	549	0.980	
5	Germany	7	4	3	11	15	14	1.071	624	621	1.005	
6	Slovenia	7	2	5	6	9	17	0.529	510	574	0.889	
7	Colombia	7	1	6	3	7	20	0.350	520	623	0.835	
8	South Korea	7	0	7	2	6	21	0.286	488	628	0.777	

Source: Volleyball Olympic Qualifying Tournament – Women's standings
(H) Host

== World ranking qualification ==
The remaining five berths were attributed to the highest-ranked eligible NOCs based on the FIVB world rankings at the end of the 2024 FIVB Volleyball Nations League preliminary phase. Under the universality principle, the teams were selected according to the order of priority: 1) those from the continent without a qualified team; and 2) highest-ranked eligible NOCs irrespective of the continent.

Qualified for the 2024 Summer Olympics via Olympic Qualification Tournament
Qualified as hosts for the 2024 Summer Olympics
Classifying via be the best ranked team from a continent without a qualified team in 2024 Summer Olympics (Africa and Asia)
Classifying via remaining spots for Top World Ranking teams not qualified via Olympic Qualification Tournament

Top 25 rankings as of 17 June 2024
Rank	Team	Points
1	Brazil	399.59
2	Italy	375.45
3	Turkey	374.27
4	Poland	361.80
5	United States	358.11
6	China	353.65
7	Japan	322.62
8	Netherlands	304.48
9	Serbia	287.93
10	Canada	284.76
11	Dominican Republic	254.58
12	Germany	218.88
13	Belgium	205.39
14	Thailand	196.38
15	Puerto Rico	181.90
16	Czech Republic	179.56
17	Argentina	177.17
18	Ukraine	172.15
19	France	166.98
20	Kenya	162.42
21	Bulgaria	153.92
22	Colombia	149.21
23	Cuba	144.19
24	Sweden	140.01
25	Cameroon	135.69

== See also ==
- Volleyball at the 2024 Summer Olympics – Men's qualification
- 2024 FIVB Women's Volleyball Nations League
