= FIVB Men's Volleyball World Olympic Qualification Tournament =

- Sport: Volleyball
- Founded: 1972
- Folded: 2016
- CEO: (Brazil) Ary Graça
- No. of teams: 8
- Continent: International (FIVB)
- Website: FIVB

The FIVB Men's Volleyball World Olympic Qualification Tournament was a volleyball qualification tournament for the Olympic Games. contested by the senior men's national teams of the members of the Fédération Internationale de Volleyball (FIVB), the sport's global governing body.

A corresponding tournament for women's national teams is the FIVB Women's Volleyball World Olympic Qualification Tournament.

== Qualification ==
=== First tournament (2016) ===
Confederation	Slots
AVC (Asia)	3
CSV (South America)	1
CEV (Europe)	2
NORCECA (North America)	1
Total	8 (7+H)

=== Second tournament (2016) ===
Confederation	Slots
CAVB (Africa)	2
CSV (South America)	1
NORCECA (North America)	1
Total	4 (4)

== Results summary ==
=== First format (1972–1984) ===
Year	Host	Qualified Teams			Teams
Year	Host	Champions	Runners-up	3rd Place	Teams
1972	France	Poland	Romania	—N/a	12
1976	Italy	Czechoslovakia	Italy	—N/a	14
1980	(Bulgaria); Pernik/Sofia	Bulgaria	Romania	—N/a	10
1984	(Spain); Barcelona	Italy*	China*	South Korea*	6

=== Second format (1988–2012) ===
Year	Qualified Teams			Teams
Year	First tournament	Second tournament	Third tournament	Teams
1988	(Brazil) Brasília (6)	(Netherlands) Amsterdam (6)	(Italy) Florence (6)	18
1988	Argentina	Netherlands	Sweden	18
1992	(France) Montpellier (6)	(Netherlands) Rotterdam (6)	—N/a	12
1992	France	Netherlands	—N/a	12
1996	(Portugal) Espinho (4)	(Germany) Munich (4)	(Greece) Patras (4)	12
1996	Bulgaria	Yugoslavia	Poland	12
2000	(Portugal) Matosinhos (4)	(Greece) Piraeus (4)	(Netherlands) Castelnau-le-Lez (4)	12
2000	Argentina	Spain	Netherlands	12
2004	(Portugal) Matosinhos (4)	(Japan) Tokyo (8)	(Spain) Madrid (4)	16
2004	Poland	France	Netherlands	16
2008	(Germany) Düsseldorf (4)	(Portugal) Espinho (4)	(Japan) Tokyo (8)	16
2008	Germany	Poland	Italy	16
2012	(Japan) Tokyo (8)	(Bulgaria) Sofia (4)	(Germany) Berlin (4)	16
2012	Serbia	Bulgaria	Germany	16

=== Third format (2016) ===
Year	Host	Qualified Teams			Teams
Year	Host	Champions	Runners-up	3rd Place	Teams
2016	(Japan); Tokyo	Poland	France	Canada	8
2016	Mexico City	Mexico	—N/a		4

== See also ==
- FIVB Women's Volleyball World Olympic Qualification Tournament
- FIVB Men's Volleyball Intercontinental Olympic Qualification Tournament
