= FIVB Volleyball Men's Intercontinental Olympic Qualification Tournaments =

- Current season, competition or edition: 2023 FIVB Volleyball Men's Olympic Qualification Tournaments
- Sport: Volleyball
- Founded: 2018; 8 years ago
- First season: 2019
- CEO: (Brazil) Ary Graça
- No. of teams: 24
- Continent: International (FIVB)
- Website: FIVB

The FIVB Volleyball Men's Intercontinental Olympic Qualification Tournaments is a volleyball qualification tournament for the Olympic Games. contested by the senior men's national teams of the members of the Fédération Internationale de Volleyball (FIVB), the sport's global governing body.

The creation of the tournament was announced in October 2018 (alongside the announcement of the 2020 Olympic Qualification System).

A corresponding tournament for women's national teams is the FIVB Volleyball Women's Intercontinental Olympic Qualification Tournaments.

== Results summary ==
Year	Qualified teams						Teams
Year	Pool A	Pool B	Pool C	Pool D	Pool E	Pool F	Teams
2019	(Bulgaria) Varna	(Netherlands) Rotterdam	(Italy) Bari	(Poland) Gdańsk	(Russia) Saint Petersburg	(China) Ningbo	24
2019	Brazil	United States	Italy	Poland	Russia	Argentina	24
2023	Pool A		Pool B		Pool C		24
2023	(Brazil) Rio de Janeiro		(Japan) Tokyo		(China) Xi'an		24
2023	Germany	Brazil	United States	Japan	Poland	Canada	24

== Appearance ==
Legend

- Rank # – Qualified for the Summer Olympics
- • – Did not enter / Did not qualify
- – Hosts

Team	2019 (24)		2023 (24)		Total
Team	Pool	Rank	Pool	Rank	Total
Argentina	F	1	C	3	2
Australia	C	3	•		1
Belgium	B	3	C	4	2
Brazil	A	1	A	2	2
Bulgaria	A	2	C	5	2
Cameroon	C	4	•		1
Canada	F	2	C	2	2
China	F	3	C	7	2
Cuba	E	3	A	3	2
Czech Republic	•		A	6	1
Egypt	A	3	B	7	2
Finland	F	4	B	6	2
France	D	2	•		1
Germany	•		A	1	1
Iran	E	2	A	7	2
Italy	C	1	A	4	2
Japan	•		B	2	1
Mexico	E	4	C	8	2
Netherlands	B	2	C	6	2
Poland	D	1	C	1	2
Puerto Rico	A	4	•		1
Qatar	•		A	8	1
Russia	E	1	DQ		1
Serbia	C	2	B	5	2
Slovenia	D	3	B	3	2
South Korea	B	4	•		1
Tunisia	D	4	B	8	2
Turkey	•		B	4	1
Ukraine	D	4	A	5	2
United States	B	1	B	1	2

== See also ==
- FIVB Volleyball Women's Intercontinental Olympic Qualification Tournaments
- FIVB Men's Volleyball World Olympic Qualification Tournament
