= 2019 FIVB Volleyball Men's Intercontinental Olympic Qualification Tournaments =

2020 pre-Olympic tournament

Tournament details
- Host countries: Bulgaria; Netherlands; Italy; Poland; Russia; China
- Dates: 9–11 August
- Teams: 24 (from 5 confederations)
- Venue: 6 (in 6 host cities)

The 2019 FIVB Volleyball Men's Intercontinental Olympic Qualification Tournaments, also known as FIVB Tokyo Volleyball Qualification, were the six volleyball tournaments that were contested by 24 men's national teams of the Fédération Internationale de Volleyball (FIVB), where the top teams earned a place in the 2020 Summer Olympics. The tournament was held from 9 to 11 August 2019.

== Qualification ==
Twenty-four teams qualified for the competition as the top twenty-four teams of FIVB World Ranking as of 1 October 2018 (except Japan who qualified as the hosts for the 2020 Summer Olympics.).

Qualified for the 2019 Intercontinental Olympic Qualifier
Already qualified as the hosts for the 2020 Summer Olympics

Seeding	Team	WC 2015	OG 2016	WL 2017	WCH 2018	Total
1	Brazil	80	100	45	90	315
2	United States	100	80	40	80	300
3	Italy	90	90	24	62	266
4	Poland	80	50	32	100	262
5	Russia	70	70	38	56	234
6	Canada	30	50	42	45	167
7	Argentina	50	50	28	33	161
8	Iran	25	50	26	36	137
9	France	0	30	50	50	130
10	Serbia	0	2	38	70	110
–	Japan	40	2	20	30	92
11	Belgium	0	1	34	45	80
12	Egypt	5	30	10	30	75
13	Bulgaria	0	2	30	40	72
14	Netherlands	0	0	18	50	68
15	Australia	5	3	19	36	63
16	Slovenia	0	0	22	40	62
17	Cuba	0	20	0	30	50
18	Finland	0	1	13	33	47
19	China	0	2	17	25	44
20	Mexico	0	20	6	14	40
21	Tunisia	5	3	5	25	38
22	Cameroon	0	2	0	30	32
23	South Korea	0	0	16	12	28
23	Puerto Rico	0	3	0	25	28

== Pools composition ==
Teams were seeded following the serpentine system according to their FIVB World Ranking as of 1 October 2018. Rankings are shown in brackets.

Pool A	Pool B	Pool C	Pool D	Pool E	Pool F
**Brazil** (1)	**United States** (2)	**Italy** (3) **(H)**	**Poland** (4) **(H)**	**Russia** (5) **(H)**	Canada (6)
Egypt (13)	Belgium (12)	Serbia (10)	France (9)	Iran (8)	**Argentina** (7)
Bulgaria (14) **(H)**	Netherlands (15) **(H)**	Australia (16)	Slovenia (17)	Cuba (18)	Finland (19)
Puerto Rico (25)	South Korea (24)	Cameroon (23)	Tunisia (22)	Mexico (21)	China (20) **(H)**

Notes

- Teams in **bold** qualified for the 2020 Summer Olympics.
- (H): Qualification group hosts

== Venues ==
Pool A	Pool B	Pool C
**Varna, Bulgaria**	**Rotterdam, Netherlands**	**Bari, Italy**
Palace of Culture and Sports	Rotterdam Ahoy	PalaFlorio
Capacity: **6,000**	Capacity: **15,818**	Capacity: **5,080**
Pool D	Pool E	Pool F
**Gdańsk–Sopot, Poland**	**Saint Petersburg, Russia**	**Ningbo, China**
Ergo Arena	Sibur Arena	Beilun Gymnasium
Capacity: **11,409**	Capacity: **7,120**	Capacity: **8,000**

== Referees ==
Pool A

- (Argentina) Celso Ricardo Cabrera
- (Italy) Andrea Puecher
- (Romania) Lucian-Vasile Nastase
- (Russia) Evgeny Makshanov

Pool B

- (Argentina) Hernan Gonzalo Casamiquela
- (Brazil) Luiz Henrique Coutinho De Oliveira
- (Canada) Andrew Cameron
- (Russia) Alexey Pashkevich

Pool C

- (Egypt) Nasr Shaaban
- (Poland) Wojciech Maroszek
- (Slovakia) Juraj Mokry
- (Spain) Mario Bernaola Sanchez

Pool D

- (Brazil) Anderson Caçador
- (Israel) Roy Goren
- (Morocco) Ali Fadili
- (Serbia) Vladimir Simonovic

Pool E

- (Argentina) Marcelo Enzo Pierobon
- (Austria) Sinisa Isajlovic
- (Bulgaria) Ivaylo Ivanov
- (Poland) Pawel Burkiewicz

Pool F

- (Japan) Shin Muranaka
- (Qatar) Ibrahim Mohd Ahmed Al Naama
- (Russia) Andrei Zenovich
- (Saudi Arabia) Khaled Al-Zughaibi

== Pool standing procedure ==
1. Total number of victories (matches won, matches lost)
2. In the event of a tie, the following first tiebreaker will apply: The teams will be ranked by the most point gained per match as follows:
  - Match won 3–0 or 3–1: 3 points for the winner, 0 points for the loser
  - Match won 3–2: 2 points for the winner, 1 point for the loser
  - Match forfeited: 3 points for the winner, 0 points (0–25, 0–25, 0–25) for the loser
3. If teams are still tied after examining the number of victories and points gained, then the FIVB will examine the results in order to break the tie in the following order:
  - Set quotient: if two or more teams are tied on the number of points gained, they will be ranked by the quotient resulting from the division of the number of all set won by the number of all sets lost.
  - Points quotient: if the tie persists based on the set quotient, the teams will be ranked by the quotient resulting from the division of all points scored by the total of points lost during all sets.
  - If the tie persists based on the point quotient, the tie will be broken based on the team that won the match of the Round Robin Phase between the tied teams. When the tie in point quotient is between three or more teams, these teams ranked taking into consideration only the matches involving the teams in question.

== Results ==
=== Pool A ===
- Dates: 9–11 August 2019
- All times are Eastern European Summer Time (UTC+03:00).

Pos	Team	Pld	W	L	Pts	SW	SL	SR	SPW	SPL	SPR	Qualification
1	Brazil	3	**3**	0	8	9	2	4.500	264	213	1.239	2020 Summer Olympics
2	Bulgaria (H)	3	**2**	1	7	8	4	2.000	284	254	1.118	
3	Egypt	3	**1**	2	3	4	6	0.667	212	240	0.883	
4	Puerto Rico	3	**0**	3	0	0	9	0.000	178	231	0.771	

(H) Host

Date	Time		Score		Set 1	Set 2	Set 3	Set 4	Set 5	Total	Report
9 Aug	17:00	**Brazil**	3–0	Puerto Rico	25–23	25–19	25–19			75–61	P2
9 Aug	20:30	Egypt	1–3	**Bulgaria**	11–25	31–33	25–19	19–25		86–102	P2
10 Aug	17:00	**Brazil**	3–0	Egypt	25–12	25–19	25–14			75–45	P2
10 Aug	20:30	Puerto Rico	0–3	**Bulgaria**	20–25	22–25	12–25			54–75	P2
11 Aug	17:00	**Egypt**	3–0	Puerto Rico	25–17	31–29	25–17			81–63	P2
11 Aug	20:30	Bulgaria	2–3	**Brazil**	25–23	25–19	30–32	16–25	11–15	107–114	P2

=== Pool B ===
- Dates: 9–11 August 2019
- All times are Central European Summer Time (UTC+02:00).

Pos	Team	Pld	W	L	Pts	SW	SL	SR	SPW	SPL	SPR	Qualification
1	United States	3	**3**	0	9	9	2	4.500	259	223	1.161	2020 Summer Olympics
2	Netherlands (H)	3	**2**	1	5	7	5	1.400	273	263	1.038	
3	Belgium	3	**1**	2	3	4	6	0.667	223	237	0.941	
4	South Korea	3	**0**	3	1	2	9	0.222	235	267	0.880	

(H) Host

Date	Time		Score		Set 1	Set 2	Set 3	Set 4	Set 5	Total	Report
9 Aug	16:00	**Netherlands**	3–2	South Korea	23–25	25–27	26–24	25–20	15–12	114–108	P2
9 Aug	19:36	Belgium	1–3	**United States**	20–25	19–25	25–17	18–25		82–92	P2
10 Aug	16:00	Belgium	0–3	**Netherlands**	22–25	21–25	20–25			63–75	P2
10 Aug	19:00	**United States**	3–0	South Korea	25–20	25–21	25–16			75–57	P2
11 Aug	16:00	Netherlands	1–3	**United States**	18–25	20–25	25–17	21–25		84–92	P2
11 Aug	19:00	South Korea	0–3	**Belgium**	25–27	21–25	24–26			70–78	P2

=== Pool C ===
- Dates: 9–11 August 2019
- All times are Central European Summer Time (UTC+02:00).

Pos	Team	Pld	W	L	Pts	SW	SL	SR	SPW	SPL	SPR	Qualification
1	Italy (H)	3	**3**	0	8	9	2	4.500	260	206	1.262	2020 Summer Olympics
2	Serbia	3	**2**	1	6	6	4	1.500	237	225	1.053	
3	Australia	3	**1**	2	4	6	6	1.000	271	269	1.007	
4	Cameroon	3	**0**	3	0	0	9	0.000	157	225	0.698	

(H) Host

Date	Time		Score		Set 1	Set 2	Set 3	Set 4	Set 5	Total	Report
9 Aug	18:00	Australia	1–3	**Serbia**	28–26	19–25	19–25	30–32		96–108	P2
9 Aug	21:15	**Italy**	3–0	Cameroon	25–18	25–18	25–16			75–52	P2
10 Aug	18:00	**Serbia**	3–0	Cameroon	25–22	25–19	25–13			75–54	P2
10 Aug	21:15	Australia	2–3	**Italy**	25–21	19–25	26–24	17–25	13–15	100–110	P2
11 Aug	18:00	Cameroon	0–3	**Australia**	17–25	16–25	18–25			51–75	P2
11 Aug	21:15	Serbia	0–3	**Italy**	16–25	19–25	19–25			54–75	P2

=== Pool D ===
- Dates: 9–11 August 2019
- All times are Central European Summer Time (UTC+02:00).

Pos	Team	Pld	W	L	Pts	SW	SL	SR	SPW	SPL	SPR	Qualification
1	Poland (H)	3	**3**	0	9	9	1	9.000	246	205	1.200	2020 Summer Olympics
2	France	3	**2**	1	6	6	4	1.500	231	229	1.009	
3	Slovenia	3	**1**	2	3	4	6	0.667	235	235	1.000	
4	Tunisia	3	**0**	3	0	1	9	0.111	203	246	0.825	

(H) Host

Date	Time		Score		Set 1	Set 2	Set 3	Set 4	Set 5	Total	Report
9 Aug	17:00	**Poland**	3–0	Tunisia	25–15	25–19	25–19			75–53	P2
9 Aug	20:30	**France**	3–0	Slovenia	26–24	25–20	25–23			76–67	P2
10 Aug	15:00	**Poland**	3–0	France	25–21	25–19	25–20			75–60	P2
10 Aug	18:30	Tunisia	0–3	**Slovenia**	23–25	16–25	24–26			63–76	P2
11 Aug	12:00	**France**	3–1	Tunisia	25–21	20–25	25–19	25–22		95–87	P2
11 Aug	15:00	**Poland**	3–1	Slovenia	21–25	25–23	25–23	25–21		96–92	P2

=== Pool E ===
- Dates: 9–11 August 2019
- All times are Moscow Time (UTC+03:00).

Pos	Team	Pld	W	L	Pts	SW	SL	SR	SPW	SPL	SPR	Qualification
1	Russia (H)	3	**3**	0	9	9	0	MAX	228	175	1.303	2020 Summer Olympics
2	Iran	3	**2**	1	5	6	5	1.200	256	235	1.089	
3	Cuba	3	**1**	2	4	5	6	0.833	238	255	0.933	
4	Mexico	3	**0**	3	0	0	9	0.000	170	227	0.749	

(H) Host

Date	Time		Score		Set 1	Set 2	Set 3	Set 4	Set 5	Total	Report
9 Aug	16:00	Iran	3–2	Cuba	23–25	26–28	25–17	25–16	15–10	114–96	P2
9 Aug	19:00	Russia	3–0	Mexico	25–15	25–11	25–17			75–43	P2
10 Aug	16:00	Iran	3–0	Mexico	25–18	25–21	27–25			77–64	P2
10 Aug	19:00	Russia	3–0	Cuba	25–18	26–24	27–25			78–67	P2
11 Aug	16:00	Cuba	3–0	Mexico	25–18	25–23	25–22			75–63	P2
11 Aug	19:00	Russia	3–0	Iran	25–19	25–23	25–23			75–65	P2

=== Pool F ===
- Dates: 9–11 August 2019
- All times are China Standard Time (UTC+08:00).

Pos	Team	Pld	W	L	Pts	SW	SL	SR	SPW	SPL	SPR	Qualification
1	Argentina	3	**3**	0	8	9	4	2.250	298	282	1.057	2020 Summer Olympics
2	Canada	3	**2**	1	5	7	5	1.400	286	263	1.087	
3	China (H)	3	**1**	2	5	7	7	1.000	302	308	0.981	
4	Finland	3	**0**	3	0	2	9	0.222	236	269	0.877	

(H) Host

Date	Time		Score		Set 1	Set 2	Set 3	Set 4	Set 5	Total	Report
9 Aug	15:00	**China**	3–1	Finland	25–22	21–25	25–22	25–23		96–92	P2
9 Aug	19:30	Canada	1–3	**Argentina**	23–25	25–22	25–27	23–25		96–99	P2
10 Aug	15:00	Finland	1–3	**Argentina**	17–25	18–25	25–21	24–26		84–97	P2
10 Aug	19:30	China	2–3	**Canada**	26–24	21–25	17–25	25–23	15–17	104–114	P2
11 Aug	15:00	**Canada**	3–0	Finland	25–16	26–24	25–20			76–60	P2
11 Aug	19:30	China	2–3	**Argentina**	25–19	22–25	21–25	25–18	9–15	102–102	P2

== Qualifying teams for the Summer Olympics ==
Team	Qualified on	Previous appearances in the Summer Olympics (Note: Bold indicates champions for that year. Italic indicates hosts for that year.)
Argentina	11 August 2019	7 (1984, 1988, 1996, 2000, 2004, 2012, 2016)
Poland	11 August 2019	9 (1968, 1972, **1976**, 1980, 1996, 2004, 2008, 2012, 2016)
United States	11 August 2019	11 (1964, 1968, **1984**, **1988**, 1992, 1996, 2000, 2004, **2008**, 2012, 2016)
Russia	11 August 2019	13 (**1964**^{1}, **1968**^{1}, 1972^{1}, 1976^{1}, **1980**^{1}, 1988^{1}, 1992^{1}, 1996, 2000, 2004, 2008, **2012**, 2016)
Brazil	11 August 2019	14 (1964, 1968, 1972, 1976, 1980, 1984, 1988, **1992**, 1996, 2000, **2004**, 2008, 2012, **2016**)
Italy	11 August 2019	11 (1976, 1980, 1984, 1988, 1992, 1996, 2000, 2004, 2008, 2012, 2016)

^{1} The team represented the Soviet Union from 1964 to 1988, and the Unified Team in 1992.

== See also ==
- 2019 FIVB Volleyball Women's Intercontinental Olympic Qualification Tournaments
