= Volleyball at the 2000 Summer Olympics – Men's North American qualification =

The North American Qualification Tournament for the 2000 Men's Olympic Volleyball Tournament was held in Winnipeg, Canada from 5 to 8 January 2000.

== Preliminary round ==
Pos	Team	Pld	W	L	Pts	SW	SL	SR	SPW	SPL	SPR	Qualification
1	Canada	3	3	0	6	9	3	3.000	287	239	1.201	Final
2	United States	3	2	1	5	6	3	2.000	216	179	1.207	Final
3	Puerto Rico	3	1	2	4	5	7	0.714	239	279	0.857	
4	Mexico	3	0	3	3	2	9	0.222	223	268	0.832	

Date		Score		Set 1	Set 2	Set 3	Set 4	Set 5	Total
5 Jan	Canada	3–0	United States	25–21	28–26	25–19			78–66
5 Jan	Puerto Rico	3–1	Mexico	23–25	25–20	25–22	25–23		98–90
6 Jan	Canada	3–1	Mexico	20–25	25–16	25–23	25–17		95–81
6 Jan	United States	3–0	Puerto Rico	25–18	25–18	25–13			75–49
7 Jan	Canada	3–2	Puerto Rico	25–21	25–27	24–26	25–10	15–8	114–92
7 Jan	United States	3–0	Mexico	25–19	25–20	25–13			75–52

== Final ==
Date		Score		Set 1	Set 2	Set 3	Set 4	Set 5	Total
8 Jan	Canada	0–3	United States	20–25	28–30	21–25			69–80

== Final standing ==
Rank	Team
1	United States
2	Canada
3	Puerto Rico
4	Mexico

Qualified for the 2000 Summer Olympics
