= 2023 FIVB Volleyball Women's Olympic Qualification Tournaments =

2023年女排奥运资格赛; FIVBパリ五輪予選/ワールドカップバレー2023; Turniej Kwalifikacyjny do Igrzysk Olimpijskich 2023
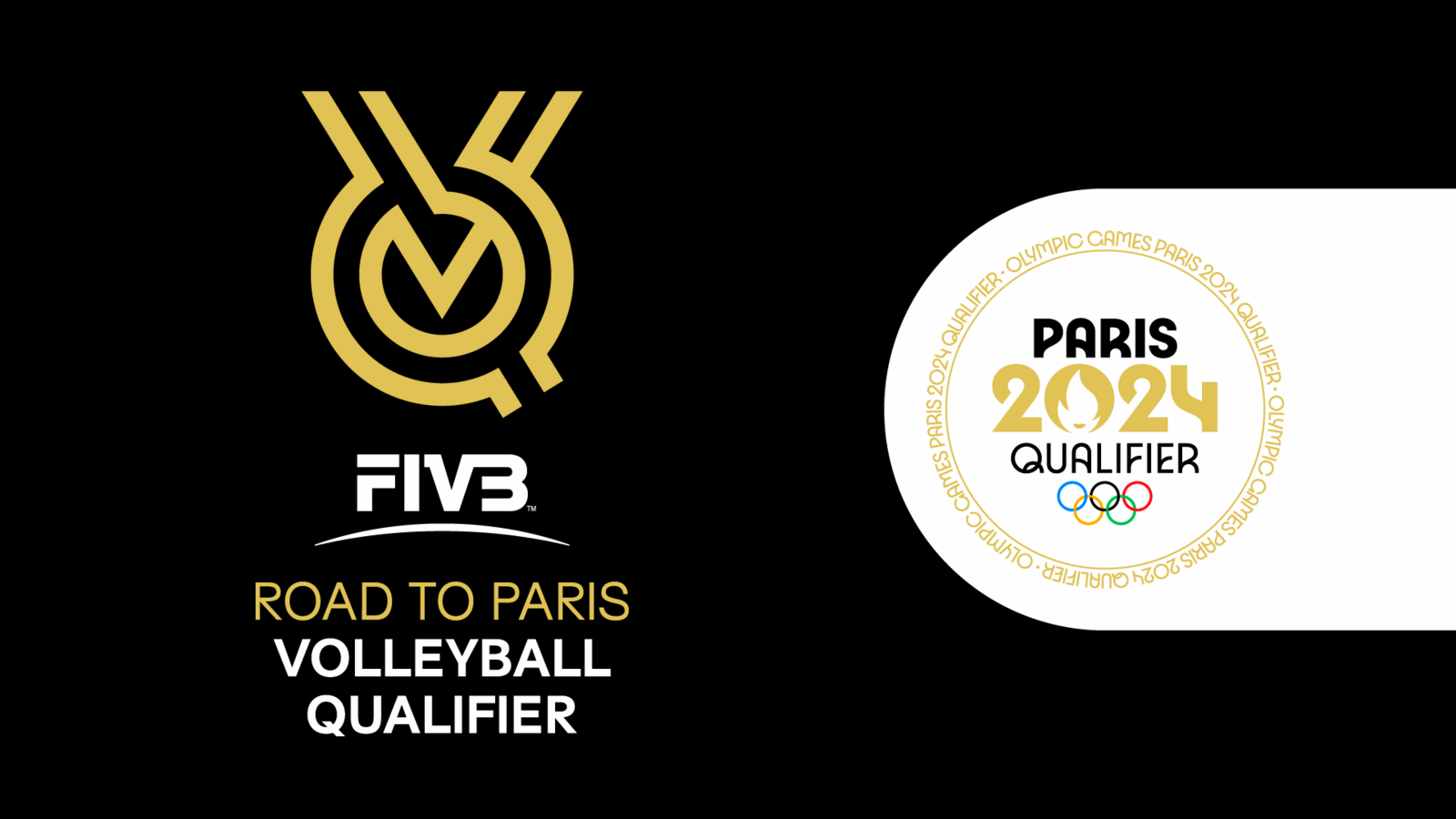
- Official logo

Tournament details
- Host countries: China; Japan; Poland
- Cities: Ningbo; Tokyo; Łódź
- Dates: 16–24 September
- Teams: 24
- Venue: 3 (in 3 host cities)

Tournament statistics
- Matches played: 84
- Attendance: 307,932 (3,666 per match)

The 2023 FIVB Volleyball Women's Olympic Qualification Tournaments, alternatively the 2023 Volleyball Women's World Cup (for the tournament held in Japan) and also known as FIVB Road to Paris Volleyball Qualifier, was the three volleyball tournaments contested by 24 women's national teams of the Fédération Internationale de Volleyball (FIVB), where the top two teams earned a place in the 2024 Summer Olympics.

== Hosts selection ==
On 16 October 2022, FIVB announced that Japan will host one of three tournaments for both men's and women's Olympic Qualification Tournaments (OQTs). The men's and women's OQTs held in Japan will traditionally use the title of World Cup Japan 2023. Later, on 8 March 2023, FIVB confirmed that China and Poland will host the remaining two tournaments for women's OQTs. China will also host the men's OQTs.

== Qualification ==
The FIVB Olympic Qualification Tournaments (OQTs) include the 24 best-placed non-qualified teams (except Russia who is ineligible to compete in the OQTs due to the 2022 Russian invasion of Ukraine) from the FIVB World Rankings as of 17 October 2022.

Country	Confederation	Qualified as	Previous appearances			Previous best performance
Country	Confederation	Qualified as	Total	First	Last	Previous best performance
Serbia	CEV	1st World ranked non-qualified team	1	2019	2019	Qualified (2019)
Italy	CEV	2nd World ranked non-qualified team	1	2019	2019	Qualified (2019)
Brazil	CSV	3rd World ranked non-qualified team	1	2019	2019	Qualified (2019)
United States	NORCECA	4th World ranked non-qualified team	1	2019	2019	Qualified (2019)
China	AVC	5th World ranked non-qualified team	1	2019	2019	Qualified (2019)
Japan	AVC	6th World ranked non-qualified team	0	None		None
Turkey	CEV	7th World ranked non-qualified team	1	2019	2019	7th place (2019)
Dominican Republic	NORCECA	9th World ranked non-qualified team	1	2019	2019	7th place (2019)
Poland	CEV	10th World ranked non-qualified team	1	2019	2019	7th place (2019)
Belgium	CEV	11th World ranked non-qualified team	1	2019	2019	13th place (2019)
Netherlands	CEV	12th World ranked non-qualified team	1	2019	2019	7th place (2019)
Germany	CEV	13th World ranked non-qualified team	1	2019	2019	13th place (2019)
Canada	NORCECA	14th World ranked non-qualified team	1	2019	2019	13th place (2019)
Thailand	AVC	15th World ranked non-qualified team	1	2019	2019	13th place (2019)
Bulgaria	CEV	16th World ranked non-qualified team	1	2019	2019	7th place (2019)
Puerto Rico	NORCECA	17th World ranked non-qualified team	1	2019	2019	19th place (2019)
Czech Republic	CEV	18th World ranked non-qualified team	1	2019	2019	19th place (2019)
Colombia	CSV	19th World ranked non-qualified team	0	None		None
Mexico	NORCECA	20th World ranked non-qualified team	1	2019	2019	19th place (2019)
Argentina	CSV	22nd World ranked non-qualified team	1	2019	2019	13th place (2019)
South Korea	AVC	23rd World ranked non-qualified team	1	2019	2019	7th place (2019)
Ukraine	CEV	24th World ranked non-qualified team	0	None		None
Slovenia	CEV	25th World ranked non-qualified team	0	None		None
Peru	CSV	26th World ranked non-qualified team	0	None		None

== Pools composition ==
According to the qualification system, the twenty-four teams were placed into three pools of eight teams. For the first position of each pool, FIVB reserved the right to the three hosts with the top-ranked hosted team allocated to pool A, the middle-ranked hosted team allocated to pool B, and the last-ranked hosted team allocated to pool C. The remaining twenty-one teams were allocated into seven pots of three teams based on the FIVB Women's World Rankings of 1 January 2023. The order of drawing was applied with the serpentine system. The teams for the even-number position (Pot 1, Pot 3, Pot 5, Pot 7) were drawn and then placed starting from pool C to pool A. The teams for the odd-number position (Pot 2, Pot 4, Pot 6) were drawn and then placed starting from pool A to pool C.

The drawing of lots ceremony was held at the FIVB headquarters "Château Les Tourelles" in Lausanne, Switzerland, on 17 March 2023, 13:00 CET.

Hosts	Pot 1	Pot 2	Pot 3
China (5); Japan (6); Poland (10)	Serbia (1); Italy (2); Brazil (3)	United States (4); Turkey (7); Dominican Republic (9)	Belgium (11); Netherlands (12); Germany (13)

Pot 4	Pot 5	Pot 6	Pot 7
Canada (14); Thailand (15); Bulgaria (16)	Puerto Rico (17); Czech Republic (18); Colombia (19)	Mexico (20); Argentina (22); South Korea (23)	Ukraine (24); Slovenia (25); Peru (26)

Final draw

Pool A	Pool B	Pool C
China	Japan	Poland
Serbia	Brazil	Italy
Dominican Republic	Turkey	United States
Netherlands	Belgium	Germany
Canada	Bulgaria	Thailand
Czech Republic	Puerto Rico	Colombia
Mexico	Argentina	South Korea
Ukraine	Peru	Slovenia

== Venues ==
Pool A	Pool B	Pool C
Ningbo, China	Tokyo, Japan	Łódź, Poland
Beilun Gymnasium	Yoyogi National Gymnasium	Atlas Arena
Capacity: 8,000	Capacity: 13,291	Capacity: 13,805

== Pool standing procedure ==
1. Total number of victories (matches won, matches lost)
2. In the event of a tie, the following first tiebreaker will apply: The teams will be ranked by the most point gained per match as follows:
  - Match won 3–0 or 3–1: 3 points for the winner, 0 points for the loser
  - Match won 3–2: 2 points for the winner, 1 point for the loser
  - Match forfeited: 3 points for the winner, 0 points (0–25, 0–25, 0–25) for the loser
3. If teams are still tied after examining the number of victories and points gained, then the FIVB will examine the results in order to break the tie in the following order:
  - Set quotient: if two or more teams are tied on the number of points gained, they will be ranked by the quotient resulting from the division of the number of all set won by the number of all sets lost.
  - Points quotient: if the tie persists based on the set quotient, the teams will be ranked by the quotient resulting from the division of all points scored by the total of points lost during all sets.
  - If the tie persists based on the point quotient, the tie will be broken based on the team that won the match of the Round Robin Phase between the tied teams. When the tie in point quotient is between three or more teams, these teams ranked taking into consideration only the matches involving the teams in question.

== Result ==
=== Pool A (Ningbo, China) ===
- All times are China Standard Time (UTC+08:00).
- The top two teams in this pool qualify for the 2024 Summer Olympics volleyball tournament.

Pos	Team	Pld	W	L	Pts	SW	SL	SR	SPW	SPL	SPR	Qualification
1	Dominican Republic	7	6	1	17	20	9	2.222	670	597	1.122	Qualified for the 2024 Olympics
2	Serbia	7	5	2	15	17	7	2.429	576	507	1.136	Qualified for the 2024 Olympics
3	Canada	7	5	2	14	17	11	1.545	615	600	1.025	
4	China (H)	7	4	3	14	17	10	1.700	620	544	1.140	
5	Netherlands	7	4	3	13	16	11	1.455	599	561	1.068	
6	Ukraine	7	2	5	6	7	17	0.412	493	563	0.876	
7	Czech Republic	7	2	5	5	8	18	0.444	545	610	0.893	
8	Mexico	7	0	7	0	2	21	0.095	435	571	0.762	

Source: Volleyball Olympic Qualifying Tournament – Women's standings
(H) Host

Date	Time		Score		Set 1	Set 2	Set 3	Set 4	Set 5	Total	Report
16 Sep	10:00	Serbia	3–0	Mexico	25–16	25–19	25–23			75–58	P2 Report
16 Sep	13:00	Dominican Republic	2–3	Czech Republic	21–25	25–21	21–25	26–24	12–15	105–110	P2 Report
16 Sep	16:20	Netherlands	2–3	Canada	30–32	25–19	25–15	17–25	13–15	110–106	P2 Report
16 Sep	19:30	China	3–0	Ukraine	25–21	25–18	25–21			75–60	P2 Report
17 Sep	10:00	Netherlands	3–0	Czech Republic	25–13	25–18	25–21			75–52	P2 Report
17 Sep	13:00	Dominican Republic	3–2	Canada	25–17	22–25	23–25	25–18	15–12	110–97	P2 Report
17 Sep	16:00	Serbia	3–0	Ukraine	25–18	25–18	25–16			75–52	P2 Report
17 Sep	19:30	China	3–0	Mexico	25–14	25–18	25–7			75–39	P2 Report
19 Sep	10:00	Serbia	3–0	Canada	25–19	25–17	25–21			75–57	P2 Report
19 Sep	13:00	Dominican Republic	3–0	Ukraine	25–17	25–21	31–29			81–67	P2 Report
19 Sep	16:00	Netherlands	3–0	Mexico	25–18	25–18	25–17			75–53	P2 Report
19 Sep	19:30	China	3–0	Czech Republic	25–12	25–16	25–23			75–51	P2 Report
20 Sep	10:00	Netherlands	3–0	Ukraine	25–23	25–21	25–16			75–60	P2 Report
20 Sep	13:00	Dominican Republic	3–0	Mexico	25–17	27–25	25–16			77–58	P2 Report
20 Sep	16:00	Serbia	3–1	Czech Republic	25–20	25–22	30–32	25–20		105–94	P2 Report
20 Sep	19:30	China	2–3	Canada	26–28	25–15	23–25	25–22	15–17	114–107	P2 Report
22 Sep	10:00	Serbia	1–3	Dominican Republic	23–25	25–18	23–25	17–25		88–93	P2 Report
22 Sep	13:00	Canada	3–1	Ukraine	25–22	23–25	25–12	25–11		98–70	P2 Report
22 Sep	16:00	Czech Republic	3–1	Mexico	25–17	25–19	18–25	29–27		97–88	P2 Report
22 Sep	19:30	China	2–3	Netherlands	25–18	26–24	19–25	24–26	13–15	107–108	P2 Report
23 Sep	10:00	Czech Republic	1–3	Ukraine	25–12	23–25	18–25	15–25		81–87	P2 Report
23 Sep	13:00	Canada	3–0	Mexico	25–22	25–22	25–17			75–61	P2 Report
23 Sep	16:00	Serbia	3–0	Netherlands	25–19	25–16	25–20			75–55	P2 Report
23 Sep	19:30	China	1–3	Dominican Republic	23–25	25–21	14–25	14–25		76–96	P2 Report
24 Sep	10:00	Mexico	1–3	Ukraine	12–25	22–25	25–22	19–25		78–97	P2 Report
24 Sep	13:00	Canada	3–0	Czech Republic	25–20	25–19	25–21			75–60	P2 Report
24 Sep	16:00	Dominican Republic	3–2	Netherlands	25–20	20–25	25–19	23–25	15–12	108–101	P2 Report
24 Sep	19:30	China	3–1	Serbia	23–25	25–22	25–14	25–22		98–83	P2 Report

=== Pool B (Tokyo, Japan) ===
- All times are Japan Standard Time (UTC+09:00).
- The top two teams in this pool qualify for the 2024 Summer Olympics volleyball tournament.
- The top team in this pool reigns over the 2023 Volleyball Women's World Cup.

Pos	Team	Pld	W	L	Pts	SW	SL	SR	SPW	SPL	SPR	Qualification
1	Turkey	7	7	0	21	21	3	7.000	603	468	1.288	Qualified for the 2024 Olympics
2	Brazil	7	6	1	16	18	7	2.571	585	479	1.221	Qualified for the 2024 Olympics
3	Japan (H)	7	5	2	16	18	6	3.000	567	463	1.225	
4	Puerto Rico	7	4	3	11	12	13	0.923	529	552	0.958	
5	Argentina	7	3	4	8	12	16	0.750	565	608	0.929	
6	Belgium	7	2	5	6	7	15	0.467	461	508	0.907	
7	Bulgaria	7	1	6	5	8	18	0.444	502	583	0.861	
8	Peru	7	0	7	1	3	21	0.143	424	575	0.737	

Source: Volleyball Olympic Qualifying Tournament – Women's standings
(H) Host

Date	Time		Score		Set 1	Set 2	Set 3	Set 4	Set 5	Total	Report
16 Sep	10:00	Belgium	3–0	Bulgaria	25–19	26–24	25–21			76–64	P2 Report
16 Sep	13:00	Turkey	3–0	Puerto Rico	25–19	25–16	25–14			75–49	P2 Report
16 Sep	16:00	Brazil	3–0	Argentina	25–17	25–20	25–22			75–59	P2 Report
16 Sep	19:25	Japan	3–0	Peru	25–9	25–19	25–15			75–43	P2 Report
17 Sep	10:00	Belgium	1–3	Puerto Rico	25–20	23–25	19–25	19–25		86–95	P2 Report
17 Sep	13:00	Turkey	3–0	Bulgaria	25–20	25–19	25–15			75–54	P2 Report
17 Sep	16:00	Brazil	3–0	Peru	25–14	25–13	25–15			75–42	P2 Report
17 Sep	19:25	Japan	3–0	Argentina	25–18	25–18	25–23			75–59	P2 Report
19 Sep	10:00	Belgium	0–3	Argentina	21–25	20–25	18–25			59–75	P2 Report
19 Sep	13:00	Turkey	3–1	Peru	25–18	25–27	25–17	29–27		104–89	P2 Report
19 Sep	16:00	Brazil	3–2	Bulgaria	25–13	22–25	27–29	25–21	15–8	114–96	P2 Report
19 Sep	19:25	Japan	3–0	Puerto Rico	25–23	25–21	25–13			75–57	P2 Report
20 Sep	10:00	Belgium	3–0	Peru	25–12	25–13	25–21			75–46	P2 Report
20 Sep	13:00	Turkey	3–1	Argentina	25–16	22–25	25–15	25–15		97–71	P2 Report
20 Sep	16:00	Brazil	3–0	Puerto Rico	25–21	25–15	25–9			75–45	P2 Report
20 Sep	19:25	Japan	3–0	Bulgaria	25–20	25–13	25–11			75–44	P2 Report
22 Sep	10:00	Puerto Rico	3–2	Argentina	28–30	19–25	25–19	25–23	15–8	112–105	P2 Report
22 Sep	13:00	Bulgaria	3–0	Peru	25–13	25–18	25–16			75–47	P2 Report
22 Sep	16:00	Brazil	0–3	Turkey	21–25	27–29	19–25			67–79	P2 Report
22 Sep	19:25	Japan	3–0	Belgium	28–26	25–18	25–14			78–58	P2 Report
23 Sep	10:00	Puerto Rico	3–0	Peru	26–24	25–22	25–21			76–67	P2 Report
23 Sep	13:00	Bulgaria	2–3	Argentina	14–25	25–14	20–25	25–19	16–18	100–101	P2 Report
23 Sep	16:00	Brazil	3–0	Belgium	25–18	25–14	25–20			75–52	P2 Report
23 Sep	19:25	Japan	1–3	Turkey	25–22	22–25	24–26	12–25		83–98	P2 Report
24 Sep	10:00	Bulgaria	1–3	Puerto Rico	14–25	25–20	18–25	12–25		69–95	P2 Report
24 Sep	13:00	Argentina	3–2	Peru	20–25	25–12	10–25	25–18	15–10	95–90	P2 Report
24 Sep	16:00	Turkey	3–0	Belgium	25–14	25–20	25–21			75–55	P2 Report
24 Sep	19:25	Japan	2–3	Brazil	21–25	25–22	25–27	25–15	10–15	106–104	P2 Report

=== Pool C (Łódź, Poland) ===
- All times are Central European Summer Time (UTC+02:00).
- The top two teams in this pool qualify for the 2024 Summer Olympics volleyball tournament.

Pos	Team	Pld	W	L	Pts	SW	SL	SR	SPW	SPL	SPR	Qualification
1	United States	7	6	1	18	19	7	2.714	626	474	1.321	Qualified for the 2024 Olympics
2	Poland (H)	7	6	1	18	20	8	2.500	644	573	1.124	Qualified for the 2024 Olympics
3	Italy	7	5	2	15	17	7	2.429	572	480	1.192	
4	Thailand	7	4	3	11	13	12	1.083	538	549	0.980	
5	Germany	7	4	3	11	15	14	1.071	624	621	1.005	
6	Slovenia	7	2	5	6	9	17	0.529	510	574	0.889	
7	Colombia	7	1	6	3	7	20	0.350	520	623	0.835	
8	South Korea	7	0	7	2	6	21	0.286	488	628	0.777	

Source: Volleyball Olympic Qualifying Tournament – Women's standings
(H) Host

Date	Time		Score		Set 1	Set 2	Set 3	Set 4	Set 5	Total	Report
16 Sep	11:30	United States	3–0	Colombia	25–12	25–12	25–13			75–37	P2 Report
16 Sep	14:30	Germany	3–0	Thailand	25–22	25–22	25–20			75–64	P2 Report
16 Sep	17:30	Poland	3–0	Slovenia	25–18	25–15	25–22			75–55	P2 Report
16 Sep	20:45	Italy	3–0	South Korea	25–11	25–20	25–17			75–48	P2 Report
17 Sep	11:30	Germany	3–1	Colombia	23–25	28–26	25–19	25–14		101–84	P2 Report
17 Sep	14:30	United States	3–0	Thailand	25–13	25–16	25–18			75–47	P2 Report
17 Sep	17:30	Poland	3–1	South Korea	25–22	24–26	25–21	25–9		99–78	P2 Report
17 Sep	20:45	Italy	3–0	Slovenia	25–15	25–15	25–17			75–47	P2 Report
19 Sep	11:30	Germany	3–2	South Korea	25–13	25–21	23–25	22–25	15–7	110–91	P2 Report
19 Sep	14:30	Italy	3–1	Thailand	25–19	21–25	25–22	25–18		96–84	P2 Report
19 Sep	17:30	Poland	3–0	Colombia	25–21	25–21	25–13			75–55	P2 Report
19 Sep	20:30	United States	3–1	Slovenia	25–13	25–13	20–25	25–13		95–64	P2 Report
20 Sep	11:30	Italy	3–0	Colombia	25–15	25–20	25–20			75–55	P2 Report
20 Sep	14:30	United States	3–1	South Korea	20–25	25–17	25–19	25–17		95–78	P2 Report
20 Sep	17:30	Poland	2–3	Thailand	18–25	25–7	22–25	25–23	12–15	102–95	P2 Report
20 Sep	20:30	Germany	3–2	Slovenia	17–25	25–21	19–25	25–16	15–12	101–99	P2 Report
22 Sep	11:30	Colombia	3–2	South Korea	25–12	14–25	20–25	25–20	15–9	99–91	P2 Report
22 Sep	14:30	Thailand	3–0	Slovenia	25–21	25–23	25–18			75–62	P2 Report
22 Sep	17:30	Poland	3–2	Germany	20–25	27–25	25–21	22–25	15–12	109–108	P2 Report
22 Sep	20:45	Italy	1–3	United States	19–25	25–23	21–25	18–25		83–98	P2 Report
23 Sep	11:30	Colombia	2–3	Slovenia	17–25	25–19	26–24	18–25	11–15	97–108	P2 Report
23 Sep	14:30	Thailand	3–0	South Korea	25–14	25–16	25–16			75–46	P2 Report
23 Sep	17:30	Poland	3–1	United States	27–25	16–25	25–23	25–16		93–89	P2 Report
23 Sep	20:45	Italy	3–0	Germany	25–20	25–22	25–15			75–57	P2 Report
24 Sep	11:30	South Korea	0–3	Slovenia	13–25	20–25	23–25			56–75	P2 Report
24 Sep	14:30	Thailand	3–1	Colombia	25–19	20–25	25–23	28–26		98–93	P2 Report
24 Sep	17:30	United States	3–1	Germany	24–26	25–21	25–9	25–16		99–72	P2 Report
24 Sep	20:30	Poland	3–1	Italy	15–25	26–24	25–23	25–21		91–93	P2 Report

== Qualifying teams for the Summer Olympics ==
Team	Qualified on	Previous appearances in the Summer Olympics (Note: Bold indicates champions for that year. Italic indicates hosts for that year.)
Turkey	23 September 2023	2 (2012, 2020)
Serbia	23 September 2023	4 (2008, 2012, 2016, 2020)
Dominican Republic	24 September 2023	3 (2004, 2012, 2020)
Brazil	24 September 2023	11 (1980, 1984, 1988, 1992, 1996, 2000, 2004, **2008**, **2012**, 2016, 2020)
United States	24 September 2023	12 (1964, 1968, 1984, 1988, 1992, 1996, 2000, 2004, 2008, 2012, 2016, **2020**)
Poland	24 September 2023	3 (1964, 1968, 2008)

== See also ==
- 2023 FIVB Volleyball Men's Olympic Qualification Tournaments
