= 2019 FIVB Volleyball Women's Intercontinental Olympic Qualification Tournaments =

Series of volleyball tournaments

Tournament details
- Host countries: Poland; China; United States; Brazil; Russia; Italy
- Dates: 1–4 August 2019
- Teams: 24
- Venue: 6 (in 6 host cities)

The 2019 FIVB Volleyball Women's Intercontinental Olympic Qualification Tournaments, also known as FIVB Tokyo Volleyball Qualification, were the six volleyball tournaments that were contested by 24 women's national teams of the Fédération Internationale de Volleyball (FIVB), where the top teams earned a place in the 2020 Summer Olympics. The tournament was held from 1 to 4 August 2019.

== Qualification ==
Twenty-four teams qualified for the competition as the top twenty-four teams of FIVB World Rankings on 1 January 2019 (except Japan who qualified as the hosts.).

Qualified for 2019 FIVB IOQT
Qualified but withdrew
2020 Summer Olympics host nation

Seeding	Team	WC 2015	OG 2016	WGP 2017	WCH 2018	Total
1	Serbia	90	90	42	100	322
2	China	100	100	40	80	320
3	United States	80	80	38	58	256
4	Brazil	50	50	50	50	200
5	Russia	70	50	28	50	198
–	Japan	50	50	32	58	190
6	Netherlands	0	70	38	70	178
7	Italy	0	30	45	90	165
8	South Korea	40	50	18	30	138
9	Dominican Republic	30	3	30	45	108
10	Argentina	25	30	8	30	93
11	Turkey	0	3	24	45	72
12	Puerto Rico	0	20	14	36	70
13	Thailand	0	3	26	36	65
14	Germany	0	2	17	40	59
15	Bulgaria	0	0	15	40	55
16	Cameroon	0	20	2	25	47
17	Canada	0	2	12	30	44
18	Belgium	0	2	22	18	42
19	Kenya	5	0	2	30	37
20	Mexico	0	0	2	33	35
21	Azerbaijan	0	0	0	33	33
22	Kazakhstan	0	1	6	25	32
23	Czech Republic	0	0	16	15	31
–	Cuba	5	0	0	25	30
24	Poland	0	1	20	8	29

== Pools composition ==
Teams were seeded following the serpentine system according to their FIVB World Ranking as of 1 January 2019. Rankings are shown in brackets.

Pool A	Pool B	Pool C	Pool D	Pool E	Pool F
**Serbia** (1)	**China** (2) **(H)**	**United States** (3) **(H)**	**Brazil** (4) **(H)**	**Russia** (5) **(H)**	Netherlands (7)
Puerto Rico (13)	Turkey (12)	Argentina (11)	Dominican Republic (10)	South Korea (9)	**Italy** (8) **(H)**
Thailand (14)	Germany (15)	Bulgaria (16)	Cameroon (17)	Canada (18)	Belgium (19)
Poland (26) **(H)**	Czech Republic (24)	Kazakhstan (23)	Azerbaijan (22)	Mexico (21)	Kenya (20)

Notes

- Teams in **bold** qualified for the final tournament.
- (H): Qualification group hosts

== Venues ==
Pool A	Pool B	Pool C
Wrocław, Poland	Ningbo, China	Bossier City, United States
Hala Orbita	Beilun Gymnasium	CenturyLink Center
Capacity: **3,000**	Capacity: **8,000**	Capacity: **12,440**
Pool D	Pool E	Pool F
Uberlândia, Brazil	Kaliningrad, Russia	Catania, Italy
Ginásio Sabiazinho	DS Yantarny	PalaCatania
Capacity: **8,000**	Capacity: **7,000**	Capacity: **5,000**

== Pool standing procedure ==
1. Total number of victories (matches won, matches lost)
2. In the event of a tie, the following first tiebreaker will apply: The teams will be ranked by the most point gained per match as follows:
  - Match won 3–0 or 3–1: 3 points for the winner, 0 points for the loser
  - Match won 3–2: 2 points for the winner, 1 point for the loser
  - Match forfeited: 3 points for the winner, 0 points (0–25, 0–25, 0–25) for the loser
3. If teams are still tied after examining the number of victories and points gained, then the FIVB will examine the results in order to break the tie in the following order:
  - Set quotient: if two or more teams are tied on the number of points gained, they will be ranked by the quotient resulting from the division of the number of all set won by the number of all sets lost.
  - Points quotient: if the tie persists based on the set quotient, the teams will be ranked by the quotient resulting from the division of all points scored by the total of points lost during all sets.
  - If the tie persists based on the point quotient, the tie will be broken based on the team that won the match of the Round Robin Phase between the tied teams. When the tie in point quotient is between three or more teams, these teams ranked taking into consideration only the matches involving the teams in question.

== Referees ==
Pool A

- (Brazil) Anderson Caçador
- (Italy) Daniele Rapisarda
- (Spain) Susana Maria Rodriguez Jativa
- (Turkey) Nurper Ozbar

Pool B

- (Egypt) Taghrid Khattab
- (Japan) Shin Muranaka
- (Russia) Alexey Pashkevich
- (Qatar) Ibrahim Mohd Ahmed Al Naama

Pool C

- (Brazil) Rogerio Espicalsky
- (Canada) Andrew Cameron
- (Mexico) Daniel Gonzalez
- (Morocco) Ali Fadili

Pool D

- (Argentina) Karina Noemi Rene
- (Canada) Scott Dziewirz
- (Mexico) Luis Gerardo Macias
- (Trinidad and Tobago) Brian Charles

Pool E

- (Bulgaria) Ivaylo Ivanov
- (Egypt) Wael Kandil
- (Greece) Epaminondas Gerothodoros
- (Slovakia) Igor Porvaznik

Pool F

- (Argentina) Pedro Fabian Concia
- (Brazil) Paulo Turci
- (Greece) Michail Themelis
- (United Kingdom) Nicholas Heckford

== Result ==
=== Pool A ===
- Venue: Hala Orbita, Wrocław, Poland
- Dates: 2–4 August 2019
- All times are Central European Summer Time (UTC+02:00).

Pos	Team	Pld	W	L	Pts	SW	SL	SR	SPW	SPL	SPR	Qualification
1	Serbia	3	**3**	0	9	9	1	9.000	246	192	1.281	2020 Olympic volleyball tournament
2	Poland (H)	3	**2**	1	5	7	5	1.400	280	267	1.049	
3	Thailand	3	**1**	2	4	5	7	0.714	261	271	0.963	
4	Puerto Rico	3	**0**	3	0	1	9	0.111	194	251	0.773	

(H) Host

Date	Time		Score		Set 1	Set 2	Set 3	Set 4	Set 5	Total	Report
2 Aug	17:00	**Serbia**	3–0	Thailand	25–15	25–22	25–18			75–55	P2 Report
2 Aug	20:30	**Poland**	3–0	Puerto Rico	25–18	30–28	25–15			80–61	P2 Report
3 Aug	17:00	**Serbia**	3–0	Puerto Rico	25–14	25–20	25–16			75–50	P2 Report
3 Aug	20:30	Thailand	2–3	**Poland**	23–25	25–22	28–26	23–25	11–15	110–113	P2 Report
4 Aug	17:00	Puerto Rico	1–3	**Thailand**	25–21	20–25	20–25	18–25		83–96	P2 Report
4 Aug	20:30	**Serbia**	3–1	Poland	21–25	25–23	25–16	25–23		96–87	P2 Report

=== Pool B ===
- Venue: Beilun Gymnasium, Ningbo, China
- Dates: 2–4 August 2019
- All times are China Standard Time (UTC+08:00).

Pos	Team	Pld	W	L	Pts	SW	SL	SR	SPW	SPL	SPR	Qualification
1	China (H)	3	**3**	0	9	9	1	9.000	246	192	1.281	2020 Olympic volleyball tournament
2	Turkey	3	**2**	1	6	6	5	1.200	238	244	0.975	
3	Germany	3	**1**	2	3	5	6	0.833	249	246	1.012	
4	Czech Republic	3	**0**	3	0	1	9	0.111	195	246	0.793	

(H) Host

Date	Time		Score		Set 1	Set 2	Set 3	Set 4	Set 5	Total	Report
2 Aug	15:00	**China**	3–0	Czech Republic	25–18	25–23	25–19			75–60	P2 Report
2 Aug	20:00	**Turkey**	3–1	Germany	27–25	25–20	17–25	25–20		94–90	P2 Report
3 Aug	15:00	**Turkey**	3–1	Czech Republic	25–15	25–22	21–25	25–17		96–79	P2 Report
3 Aug	20:00	**China**	3–1	Germany	25–22	25–22	21–25	25–15		96–84	P2 Report
4 Aug	15:00	Czech Republic	0–3	**Germany**	18–25	22–25	16–25			56–75	P2 Report
4 Aug	20:00	**China**	3–0	Turkey	25–18	25–12	25–18			75–48	P2 Report

=== Pool C ===
- Venue: CenturyLink Center, Shreveport-Bossier City, United States
- Dates: 2–4 August 2019
- All times are Central Daylight Time (UTC−05:00).

Pos	Team	Pld	W	L	Pts	SW	SL	SR	SPW	SPL	SPR	Qualification
1	United States (H)	3	**3**	0	8	9	2	4.500	257	187	1.374	2020 Olympic volleyball tournament
2	Bulgaria	3	**2**	1	7	8	4	2.000	272	226	1.204	
3	Argentina	3	**1**	2	3	4	7	0.571	222	243	0.914	
4	Kazakhstan	3	**0**	3	0	1	9	0.111	152	247	0.615	

(H) Host

Date	Time		Score		Set 1	Set 2	Set 3	Set 4	Set 5	Total	Report
2 Aug	15:00	Argentina	1–3	**Bulgaria**	26–24	9–25	18–25	20–25		73–99	P2 Report
2 Aug	18:00	**United States**	3–0	Kazakhstan	25–17	25–10	25–10			75–37	P2 Report
3 Aug	17:00	**United States**	3–2	Bulgaria	21–25	25–18	21–25	25–20	15–10	107–98	P2 Report
3 Aug	20:00	Kazakhstan	1–3	**Argentina**	25–22	8–25	20–25	16–25		69–97	P2 Report
4 Aug	13:00	**United States**	3–0	Argentina	25–22	25–17	25–13			75–52	P2 Report
4 Aug	16:00	Kazakhstan	0–3	**Bulgaria**	14–25	16–25	16–25			46–75	P2 Report

=== Pool D ===
- Venue: Ginásio do Sabiázinho, Uberlândia, Brazil
- Dates: 1–3 August 2019
- All times are UTC−03:00.

Pos	Team	Pld	W	L	Pts	SW	SL	SR	SPW	SPL	SPR	Qualification
1	Brazil (H)	3	**3**	0	7	9	4	2.250	290	238	1.218	2020 Olympic volleyball tournament
2	Dominican Republic	3	**2**	1	7	8	3	2.667	251	214	1.173	
3	Azerbaijan	3	**1**	2	4	5	6	0.833	224	235	0.953	
4	Cameroon	3	**0**	3	0	0	9	0.000	147	225	0.653	

(H) Host

Date	Time		Score		Set 1	Set 2	Set 3	Set 4	Set 5	Total	Report
1 Aug	14:15	**Brazil**	3–0	Cameroon	25–14	25–13	25–16			75–43	P2 Report
1 Aug	16:45	**Dominican Republic**	3–0	Azerbaijan	25–15	25–22	25–18			75–55	P2 Report
2 Aug	14:15	**Brazil**	3–2	Azerbaijan	25–13	23–25	21–25	25–19	15–12	109–94	P2 Report
2 Aug	16:45	Cameroon	0–3	**Dominican Republic**	20–25	19–25	14–25			53–75	P2 Report
3 Aug	10:00	**Brazil**	3–2	Dominican Republic	25–22	25–19	23–25	18–25	15–10	106–101	P2 Report
3 Aug	12:30	**Azerbaijan**	3–0	Cameroon	25–17	25–14	25–20			75–51	P2 Report

=== Pool E ===
- Venue: Yantarny Sports Palace, Kaliningrad, Russia
- Dates: 2–4 August 2019
- All times are Kaliningrad Time (UTC+02:00).

Pos	Team	Pld	W	L	Pts	SW	SL	SR	SPW	SPL	SPR	Qualification
1	Russia (H)	3	**3**	0	8	9	2	4.500	257	200	1.285	2020 Olympic volleyball tournament
2	South Korea	3	**2**	1	7	8	4	2.000	271	252	1.075	
3	Canada	3	**1**	2	3	4	6	0.667	217	225	0.964	
4	Mexico	3	**0**	3	0	0	9	0.000	159	227	0.700	

(H) Host

Date	Time		Score		Set 1	Set 2	Set 3	Set 4	Set 5	Total	Report
2 Aug	16:00	**South Korea**	3–1	Canada	21–25	25–20	25–19	25–22		96–86	P2 Report
2 Aug	19:00	**Russia**	3–0	Mexico	25–13	25–8	26–24			76–45	P2 Report
3 Aug	16:00	**South Korea**	3–0	Mexico	25–21	25–15	26–24			76–60	P2 Report
3 Aug	19:00	**Russia**	3–0	Canada	25–13	25–21	25–22			75–56	P2 Report
4 Aug	16:00	Mexico	0–3	**Canada**	22–25	15–25	17–25			54–75	P2 Report
4 Aug	19:00	**Russia**	3–2	South Korea	21–25	20–25	25–22	25–16	15–11	106–99	P2 Report

=== Pool F ===
- Venue: PalaCatania, Catania, Italy
- Dates: 2–4 August 2019
- All times are Central European Summer Time (UTC+02:00).

Pos	Team	Pld	W	L	Pts	SW	SL	SR	SPW	SPL	SPR	Qualification
1	Italy (H)	3	**3**	0	9	9	0	MAX	225	152	1.480	2020 Olympic volleyball tournament
2	Netherlands	3	**2**	1	6	6	3	2.000	212	169	1.254	
3	Belgium	3	**1**	2	3	3	6	0.500	181	186	0.973	
4	Kenya	3	**0**	3	0	0	9	0.000	114	225	0.507	

(H) Host

Date	Time		Score		Set 1	Set 2	Set 3	Set 4	Set 5	Total	Report
2 Aug	18:00	Belgium	0–3	**Netherlands**	20–25	15–25	22–25			57–75	P2 Report
2 Aug	21:15	**Italy**	3–0	Kenya	25–17	25–10	25–14			75–41	P2 Report
3 Aug	18:00	**Netherlands**	3–0	Kenya	25–17	25–10	25–10			75–37	P2 Report
3 Aug	21:15	Belgium	0–3	**Italy**	17–25	16–25	16–25			49–75	P2 Report
4 Aug	18:00	Kenya	0–3	**Belgium**	15–25	14–25	7–25			36–75	P2 Report
4 Aug	21:15	Netherlands	0–3	**Italy**	23–25	17–25	22–25			62–75	P2 Report

== Qualifying teams for the Summer Olympics ==
Team	Qualified on	Previous appearances in the Summer Olympics (Note: Bold indicates champions for that year. Italic indicates hosts for that year.)
Serbia	4 August 2019	3 (2008, 2012, 2016)
China	4 August 2019	9 (**1984**, 1988, 1992, 1996, 2000, **2004**, 2008, 2012, **2016**)
United States	4 August 2019	11 (1964, 1968, 1984, 1988, 1992, 1996, 2000, 2004, 2008, 2012, 2016)
Brazil	3 August 2019	10 (1980, 1984, 1988, 1992, 1996, 2000, 2004, **2008**, **2012**, 2016)
Russia	4 August 2019	13 (1964^{1}, **1968**^{1}, **1972**^{1}, 1976^{1}, **1980**^{1}, **1988**^{1}, 1992^{1}, 1996, 2000, 2004, 2008, 2012, 2016)
Italy	4 August 2019	5 (2000, 2004, 2008, 2012, 2016)

^{1} The team represented the Soviet Union from 1964 to 1988, and the Unified Team in 1992.

== See also ==
- 2019 FIVB Volleyball Men's Intercontinental Olympic Qualification Tournaments
