= Volleyball at the 2000 Summer Olympics – Men's qualification =

2000 Volleyball at the Summer Olympics – Men's qualification
- Dates: 12 June 1999 – 27 July 2000
- Teams: 24 (from 5 confederations)

The The qualification for 2000 Men's Olympic Volleyball Tournament was held from 12 June 1999 to 27 July 2000.

== Means of qualification ==
Qualified for the 2000 Summer Olympics

== Host country ==
FIVB reserved a vacancy for the 2000 Summer Olympics host country to participate in the tournament.

- Australia

== 1999 World Cup ==
- Venues: Japan
- Dates: 18 November – 2 December 1999
- The top three teams qualified for the 2000 Summer Olympics.

Rank	Team
1st place, gold medalist(s)	Russia
2nd place, silver medalist(s)	Cuba
3rd place, bronze medalist(s)	Italy
4	United States
5	Brazil
6	Spain
7	South Korea
8	Canada
9	Argentina
10	Japan
11	China
12	Tunisia

== Continental qualification tournaments ==
- The winners in each tournament qualified for the 2000 Summer Olympics.

=== Africa ===
- Host: Cairo, Egypt
- Dates: 25–30 January 2000

Pos	Team	Pld	W	L	Pts	SW	SL	SR	SPW	SPL	SPR	Qualification
1	Egypt	5	5	0	10	15	0	MAX	375	266	1.410	2000 Summer Olympics
2	Tunisia	5	4	1	9	12	8	1.500	439	404	1.087	
3	Algeria	5	3	2	8	11	8	1.375	408	386	1.057	
4	Nigeria	5	2	3	7	8	11	0.727	400	418	0.957	
5	Cameroon	5	1	4	6	8	12	0.667	420	454	0.925	
6	South Africa	5	0	5	5	0	15	0.000	261	375	0.696	

Date		Score		Set 1	Set 2	Set 3	Set 4	Set 5	Total
25 Jan	Tunisia	3–1	Cameroon	25–13	18–25	29–27	25–18		97–83
25 Jan	Algeria	3–0	Nigeria	25–17	25–22	25–20			75–59
25 Jan	Egypt	3–0	South Africa	25–20	25–16	25–22			75–58
26 Jan	Tunisia	3–2	Nigeria	23–25	26–24	25–22	23–25	15–8	112–104
26 Jan	Algeria	3–0	South Africa	25–15	25–15	25–17			75–47
26 Jan	Egypt	3–0	Cameroon	25–15	25–21	25–22			75–58
27 Jan	Cameroon	3–0	South Africa	25–23	25–21	25–20			75–64
27 Jan	Egypt	3–0	Nigeria	25–21	25–18	25–17			75–56
27 Jan	Tunisia	3–2	Algeria	20–25	25–17	19–25	25–17	18–16	107–100
29 Jan	Nigeria	3–2	Cameroon	25–22	24–26	16–25	25–19	16–14	106–106
29 Jan	Tunisia	3–0	South Africa	25–14	25–11	25–17			75–42
29 Jan	Egypt	3–0	Algeria	25–15	25–19	25–12			75–46
30 Jan	Nigeria	3–0	South Africa	25–11	25–20	25–19			75–50
30 Jan	Algeria	3–2	Cameroon	26–28	25–14	21–25	25–22	15–9	112–98
30 Jan	Egypt	3–0	Tunisia	25–17	25–19	25–12			75–48

=== Asia and Oceania ===
- Host: Shanghai, China
- Dates: 27–29 December 1999

Pos	Team	Pld	W	L	Pts	SW	SL	SR	SPW	SPL	SPR	Qualification
1	South Korea	3	3	0	6	9	1	9.000	246	207	1.188	2000 Summer Olympics
2	Japan	3	2	1	5	6	6	1.000	275	285	0.965	
3	China	3	1	2	4	5	6	0.833	254	243	1.045	
4	Chinese Taipei	3	0	3	3	2	9	0.222	240	280	0.857	

Date		Score		Set 1	Set 2	Set 3	Set 4	Set 5	Total
27 Dec	South Korea	3–1	Chinese Taipei	25–18	21–25	25–20	25–19		96–82
27 Dec	Japan	3–2	China	20–25	29–27	18–25	25–23	15–13	107–113
28 Dec	China	3–0	Chinese Taipei	25–23	25–21	25–17			75–61
28 Dec	South Korea	3–0	Japan	25–22	25–19	25–18			75–59
29 Dec	Japan	3–1	Chinese Taipei	29–27	29–27	26–28	25–15		109–97
29 Dec	South Korea	3–0	China	25–23	25–21	25–22			75–66

=== Europe ===
- Venue: Spodek, Katowice, Poland
- Dates: 3–9 January 2000

Rank	Team
1	Yugoslavia
2	Bulgaria
3	Netherlands
4	Poland
5	Czech Republic
6	Latvia

=== North America ===
- Host: Winnipeg, Canada
- Dates: 5–8 January 2000

Rank	Team
1	United States
2	Canada
3	Puerto Rico
4	Mexico

=== South America ===
- Host: São Caetano do Sul, Brazil
- Dates: 7–9 January 2000
- All times are Brasília Official Summer Time (UTC−02:00).

Pos	Team	Pld	W	L	Pts	SW	SL	SR	SPW	SPL	SPR	Qualification
1	Brazil	3	3	0	6	9	2	4.500	276	219	1.260	2000 Summer Olympics
2	Argentina	3	2	1	5	8	4	2.000	297	269	1.104	
3	Venezuela	3	1	2	4	4	6	0.667	219	221	0.991	
4	Colombia	3	0	3	3	0	9	0.000	142	225	0.631	

Date	Time		Score		Set 1	Set 2	Set 3	Set 4	Set 5	Total
7 Jan	09:00	Brazil	3–0	Colombia	25–13	25–11	25–13			75–37
7 Jan	11:00	Argentina	3–1	Venezuela	25–22	22–25	25–19	25–21		97–87
8 Jan	11:00	Argentina	3–0	Colombia	25–19	25–16	25–21			75–56
8 Jan	14:00	Brazil	3–0	Venezuela	25–21	25–18	25–18			75–57
9 Jan	11:00	Brazil	3–2	Argentina	21–25	32–30	25–22	33–35	15–13	126–125
9 Jan	14:00	Venezuela	3–0	Colombia	25–14	25–17	25–18			75–49

== World qualification tournaments ==
- The winners in each tournament qualified for the 2000 Summer Olympics.

=== 1st tournament ===
- Host: Matosinhos, Portugal
- Dates: 21–23 July 2000

Pos	Team	Pld	W	L	Pts	SW	SL	SR	SPW	SPL	SPR	Qualification
1	Argentina	3	3	0	6	9	1	9.000	254	215	1.181	2000 Summer Olympics
2	Japan	3	2	1	5	6	3	2.000	212	190	1.116	
3	Venezuela	3	1	2	4	4	8	0.500	249	281	0.886	
4	Portugal	3	0	3	3	2	9	0.222	237	266	0.891	

Date		Score		Set 1	Set 2	Set 3	Set 4	Set 5	Total
21 Jul	Argentina	3–0	Japan	25–20	25–21	25–21			75–62
21 Jul	Venezuela	3–2	Portugal	25–19	25–23	22–25	25–27	15–12	112–106
22 Jul	Argentina	3–1	Venezuela	25–17	25–27	25–20	25–20		100–84
22 Jul	Japan	3–0	Portugal	25–21	25–20	25–21			75–62
23 Jul	Japan	3–0	Venezuela	25–18	25–15	25–20			75–53
23 Jul	Argentina	3–0	Portugal	25–21	25–21	29–27			79–69

=== 2nd tournament ===
- Host: Piraeus, Greece
- Dates: 24–26 July 2000

Pos	Team	Pld	W	L	Pts	SW	SL	SR	SPW	SPL	SPR	Qualification
1	Spain	3	3	0	6	9	0	MAX	228	178	1.281	2000 Summer Olympics
2	China	3	2	1	5	6	5	1.200	248	244	1.016	
3	Greece	3	1	2	4	3	7	0.429	219	227	0.965	
4	Tunisia	3	0	3	3	3	9	0.333	237	283	0.837	

Date		Score		Set 1	Set 2	Set 3	Set 4	Set 5	Total
24 Jul	Spain	3–0	China	26–24	25–19	25–17			76–60
24 Jul	Greece	3–1	Tunisia	25–15	20–25	25–18	25–17		95–75
25 Jul	Spain	3–0	Tunisia	25–19	25–17	25–20			75–56
25 Jul	China	3–0	Greece	25–18	25–22	25–22			75–62
26 Jul	China	3–2	Tunisia	25–21	25–21	23–25	25–27	15–12	113–106
26 Jul	Spain	3–0	Greece	27–25	25–17	25–20			77–62

=== 3rd tournament ===
- Host: Castelnau-le-Lez, France
- Dates: 25–27 July 2000

Pos	Team	Pld	W	L	Pts	SW	SL	SR	SPW	SPL	SPR	Qualification
1	Netherlands	3	3	0	6	9	1	9.000	244	188	1.298	2000 Summer Olympics
2	France	3	2	1	5	7	5	1.400	272	250	1.088	
3	Canada	3	1	2	4	5	6	0.833	235	234	1.004	
4	Chinese Taipei	3	0	3	3	0	9	0.000	146	225	0.649	

Date		Score		Set 1	Set 2	Set 3	Set 4	Set 5	Total
25 Jul	Netherlands	3–0	Chinese Taipei	25–17	25–10	25–15			75–42
25 Jul	France	3–2	Canada	22–25	25–23	21–25	25–21	15–9	108–103
26 Jul	Netherlands	3–0	Canada	25–21	25–18	25–18			75–57
26 Jul	France	3–0	Chinese Taipei	25–23	25–14	25–16			75–53
27 Jul	Canada	3–0	Chinese Taipei	25–19	25–18	25–14			75–51
27 Jul	Netherlands	3–1	France	25–20	19–25	25–23	25–21		94–89
