= Volleyball at the 2000 Summer Olympics – Men's tournament =

Men's volleyball at the Games of the XXVII Olympiad
- Venue: Sydney Entertainment Centre and Sydney Showground Pavilion 4
- Date: 17 September – 1 October
- Competitors: 144 from 12 nations

Medalists
1st place, gold medalist(s)		FR Yugoslavia (1st title)
2nd place, silver medalist(s)		Russia
3rd place, bronze medalist(s)		Italy

The men's tournament in volleyball at the 2000 Summer Olympics was the 10th edition of the event at the Summer Olympics, organized by the world's governing body, the FIVB in conjunction with the IOC. It was held in Sydney, Australia from 17 September to 1 October 2000.

== Qualification ==
Means of qualification	Date	Host	Vacancies	Qualified
Host country	24 September 1993	(Monaco) Monte Carlo	1	Australia
1999 World Cup	18 November – 2 December 1999	Japan	3	Russia
1999 World Cup	18 November – 2 December 1999	Japan	3	Cuba
1999 World Cup	18 November – 2 December 1999	Japan	3	Italy
African Qualifier	25–30 January 2000	(Egypt) Cairo	1	Egypt
Asian Qualifier	27–29 December 1999	(China) Shanghai	1	South Korea
European Qualifier	3–9 January 2000	(Poland) Katowice	1	FR Yugoslavia
North American Qualifier	5–8 January 2000	(Canada) Winnipeg	1	United States
South American Qualifier	7–9 January 2000	(Brazil) São Caetano do Sul	1	Brazil
1st World Qualifier	21–23 July 2000	(Portugal) Matosinhos	1	Argentina
2nd World Qualifier	24–26 July 2000	(Greece) Piraeus	1	Spain
3rd World Qualifier	25–27 July 2000	(France) Castelnau-le-Lez	1	Netherlands
Total			12	

== Pools composition ==
Teams were seeded following the serpentine system according to their FIVB World Ranking as of January 2000. FIVB reserved the right to seed the hosts as head of pool A regardless of the World Ranking. Rankings are shown in brackets except the hosts.

Pool A	Pool B
Australia (Hosts)	Italy (1)
Cuba (3)	Russia (2)
Brazil (4)	United States (5)
Netherlands (7)	Yugoslavia (6)
Spain (8)	Argentina (9)
Egypt (23)	South Korea (10)

== Venues ==
Main venue	Sub venue
Sydney, Australia	Sydney, Australia
Sydney Entertainment Centre	Sydney Showground Pavilion 4
Capacity: 10,517	Capacity: 6,000

== Preliminary round ==
- The top four teams in each pool qualified for the quarterfinals.

=== Pool A ===
Pos	Team	Pld	W	L	Pts	SW	SL	SR	SPW	SPL	SPR	Qualification
1	Brazil	5	5	0	10	15	1	15.000	415	331	1.254	Quarterfinals
2	Netherlands	5	4	1	9	12	5	2.400	417	360	1.158	Quarterfinals
3	Cuba	5	3	2	8	9	7	1.286	383	335	1.143	Quarterfinals
4	Australia	5	2	3	7	6	10	0.600	327	374	0.874	Quarterfinals
5	Spain	5	1	4	6	7	12	0.583	404	444	0.910	
6	Egypt	5	0	5	5	1	15	0.067	309	411	0.752	

17 September 2000	Spain	3–0	Egypt	Sydney Showground Pavilion 4
17 September 2000	(25–20, 25–10, 25–21)			Sydney Showground Pavilion 4

17 September 2000	Cuba	0–3	Netherlands	Sydney Entertainment Centre
17 September 2000	(22–25, 20–25, 23–25)			Sydney Entertainment Centre

17 September 2000	Australia	0–3	Brazil	Sydney Entertainment Centre
17 September 2000	(13–25, 14–25, 21–25)			Sydney Entertainment Centre

19 September 2000	Spain	1–3	Cuba	Sydney Showground Pavilion 4
19 September 2000	(21–25, 12–25, 25–21, 20–25)			Sydney Showground Pavilion 4

19 September 2000	Egypt	0–3	Brazil	Sydney Entertainment Centre
19 September 2000	(28–30, 18–25, 21–25)			Sydney Entertainment Centre

19 September 2000	Netherlands	3–0	Australia	Sydney Entertainment Centre
19 September 2000	(25–19, 25–17, 25–15)			Sydney Entertainment Centre

21 September 2000	Cuba	3–0	Egypt	Sydney Showground Pavilion 4
21 September 2000	(25–11, 25–18, 25–15)			Sydney Showground Pavilion 4

21 September 2000	Brazil	3–0	Netherlands	Sydney Entertainment Centre
21 September 2000	(25–20, 25–17, 27–25)			Sydney Entertainment Centre

21 September 2000	Australia	3–1	Spain	Sydney Entertainment Centre
21 September 2000	(23–25, 25–20, 25–23, 25–19)			Sydney Entertainment Centre

23 September 2000	Egypt	1–3	Netherlands	Sydney Showground Pavilion 4
23 September 2000	(21–25, 11–25, 33–31, 20–25)			Sydney Showground Pavilion 4

23 September 2000	Cuba	3–0	Australia	Sydney Entertainment Centre
23 September 2000	(25–17, 25–20, 25–18)			Sydney Entertainment Centre

23 September 2000	Spain	1–3	Brazil	Sydney Entertainment Centre
23 September 2000	(27–25, 14–25, 21–25, 20–25)			Sydney Entertainment Centre

25 September 2000	Netherlands	3–1	Spain	Sydney Showground Pavilion 4
25 September 2000	(25–18, 25–17, 24–26, 25–21)			Sydney Showground Pavilion 4

25 September 2000	Brazil	3–0	Cuba	Sydney Entertainment Centre
25 September 2000	(28–26, 30–28, 25–18)			Sydney Entertainment Centre

25 September 2000	Australia	3–0	Egypt	Sydney Entertainment Centre
25 September 2000	(25–17, 25–23, 25–22)			Sydney Entertainment Centre

=== Pool B ===
Pos	Team	Pld	W	L	Pts	SW	SL	SR	SPW	SPL	SPR	Qualification
1	Italy	5	5	0	10	15	4	3.750	482	421	1.145	Quarterfinals
2	Russia	5	4	1	9	13	7	1.857	465	443	1.050	Quarterfinals
3	FR Yugoslavia	5	3	2	8	12	9	1.333	489	461	1.061	Quarterfinals
4	Argentina	5	2	3	7	7	11	0.636	409	446	0.917	Quarterfinals
5	South Korea	5	1	4	6	8	14	0.571	491	504	0.974	
6	United States	5	0	5	5	5	15	0.333	417	478	0.872	

17 September 2000	South Korea	0–3	Italy	Sydney Showground Pavilion 4
17 September 2000	(25–27, 23–25, 18–25)			Sydney Showground Pavilion 4

17 September 2000	Russia	3–1	FR Yugoslavia	Sydney Entertainment Centre
17 September 2000	(19–25, 25–23, 25–23, 25–20)			Sydney Entertainment Centre

17 September 2000; 18:30	United States	1–3	Argentina	Sydney Entertainment Centre; Attendance: 8,519; Referees: Stoyan Stoyanov (Bulgaria), Wang Ching (China)
17 September 2000; 18:30	(26–24, 23–25, 21–25, 18–25)			Sydney Entertainment Centre; Attendance: 8,519; Referees: Stoyan Stoyanov (Bulgaria), Wang Ching (China)

19 September 2000	Argentina	3–1	South Korea	Sydney Showground Pavilion 4
19 September 2000	(25–23, 17–25, 30–28, 25–21)			Sydney Showground Pavilion 4

19 September 2000; 14:30	Russia	3–1	United States	Sydney Entertainment Centre; Attendance: 7,223; Referees: Dean Turner (Australia), Fernando Nava (Mexico)
19 September 2000; 14:30	(25–18, 25–23, 21–25, 25–17)			Sydney Entertainment Centre; Attendance: 7,223; Referees: Dean Turner (Australia), Fernando Nava (Mexico)

19 September 2000	FR Yugoslavia	2–3	Italy	Sydney Entertainment Centre
19 September 2000	(19–25, 25–19, 22–25, 33–31, 20–22)			Sydney Entertainment Centre

21 September 2000; 12:30	United States	0–3	FR Yugoslavia	Sydney Showground Pavilion 4 Attendance: 4,348; Referees: Josebel Palmeirim (Brazil), Wang Ning (China)
21 September 2000; 12:30	(15–25, 20–25, 23–25)			Sydney Showground Pavilion 4 Attendance: 4,348; Referees: Josebel Palmeirim (Brazil), Wang Ning (China)

21 September 2000	Italy	3–0	Argentina	Sydney Entertainment Centre
21 September 2000	(40–38, 25–18, 25–14)			Sydney Entertainment Centre

21 September 2000	South Korea	2–3	Russia	Sydney Entertainment Centre
21 September 2000	(22–25, 25–22, 25–20, 27–29, 15–17)			Sydney Entertainment Centre

23 September 2000	FR Yugoslavia	3–1	Argentina	Sydney Showground Pavilion 4
23 September 2000	(21–25, 25–15, 25–23, 25–22)			Sydney Showground Pavilion 4

23 September 2000	Russia	1–3	Italy	Sydney Entertainment Centre
23 September 2000	(20–25, 20–25, 25–22, 22–25)			Sydney Entertainment Centre

23 September 2000; 18:30	South Korea	3–2	United States	Sydney Entertainment Centre; Attendance: 8,095; Referees: Bela Hobor (Hungary), Themistoklis Kalpaktsoglou (Greece)
23 September 2000; 18:30	(25–20, 25–27, 26–24, 21–25, 15–13)			Sydney Entertainment Centre; Attendance: 8,095; Referees: Bela Hobor (Hungary), Themistoklis Kalpaktsoglou (Greece)

25 September 2000	Argentina	0–3	Russia	Sydney Showground Pavilion 4
25 September 2000	(23–25, 15–25, 20–25)			Sydney Showground Pavilion 4

25 September 2000	South Korea	2–3	FR Yugoslavia	Sydney Entertainment Centre
25 September 2000	(26–24, 20–25, 23–25, 25–19, 8–15)			Sydney Entertainment Centre

25 September 2000; 20:30	Italy	3–1	United States	Sydney Entertainment Centre; Attendance: 7,960; Referees: Dean Turner (Australia), Wang Ning (China)
25 September 2000; 20:30	(21–25, 25–18, 25–18, 25–18)			Sydney Entertainment Centre; Attendance: 7,960; Referees: Dean Turner (Australia), Wang Ning (China)

== Final round ==
Quarterfinals
27 September
Brazil	1
Argentina	3
27 September
Cuba	2
Russia	3
27 September
Netherlands	2
FR Yugoslavia	3
27 September
Australia	1
Italy	3

Semifinals
29 September
Argentina	1
Russia	3
29 September
FR Yugoslavia	3
Italy	0

Gold medal match
1 October
Russia	0
FR Yugoslavia	3
Bronze medal match
1 October
Argentina	0
Italy	3

5th–8th semifinals
28 September
Brazil	3
Cuba	2
28 September
Netherlands	3
Australia	0

5th place match
29 September
Brazil	0
Netherlands	3
7th place match
29 September
Cuba	3
Australia	0

=== Quarterfinals ===
27 September 2000	Cuba	2–3	Russia	Sydney Entertainment Centre
27 September 2000	(25–21, 23–25, 19–25, 25–19, 13–15)			Sydney Entertainment Centre

27 September 2000	Australia	1–3	Italy	Sydney Entertainment Centre
27 September 2000	(14–25, 25–22, 19–25, 15–25)			Sydney Entertainment Centre

27 September 2000	Brazil	1–3	Argentina	Sydney Entertainment Centre
27 September 2000	(25–17, 21–25, 19–25, 25–27)			Sydney Entertainment Centre

27 September 2000	Netherlands	2–3	FR Yugoslavia	Sydney Entertainment Centre
27 September 2000	(21–25, 25–18, 18–25 ,32–30, 15–17)			Sydney Entertainment Centre

=== 5th–8th semifinals ===
28 September 2000	Brazil	3–2	Cuba	Sydney Showground Pavilion 4
28 September 2000	(23–25, 17–25, 25–21 ,26–24, 15–11)			Sydney Showground Pavilion 4

28 September 2000	Netherlands	3–0	Australia	Sydney Showground Pavilion 4
28 September 2000	(25–20, 25–15, 25–21)			Sydney Showground Pavilion 4

=== Semifinals ===
29 September 2000	Argentina	1–3	Russia	Sydney Entertainment Centre
29 September 2000	(25–27, 30–32, 25–21 ,11–25)			Sydney Entertainment Centre

29 September 2000	FR Yugoslavia	3–0	Italy	Sydney Entertainment Centre
29 September 2000	(27–25 ,34–32, 25–14)			Sydney Entertainment Centre

=== 7th place match ===
29 September 2000	Cuba	3–0	Australia	Sydney Entertainment Centre
29 September 2000	(25–23, 25–11, 25–15)			Sydney Entertainment Centre

=== 5th place match ===
29 September 2000	Brazil	0–3	Netherlands	Sydney Entertainment Centre
29 September 2000	(21–25, 20–25, 22–25)			Sydney Entertainment Centre

=== Bronze medal match ===
1 October 2000	Argentina	0–3	Italy	Sydney Entertainment Centre
1 October 2000	(16–25, 15–25, 18–25)			Sydney Entertainment Centre

=== Gold medal match ===
1 October 2000	FR Yugoslavia	3–0	Russia	Sydney Entertainment Centre
1 October 2000	(25–22, 25–22, 25–20)			Sydney Entertainment Centre

== Final standing ==
Rank	Team
1st place, gold medalist(s)	FR Yugoslavia
2nd place, silver medalist(s)	Russia
3rd place, bronze medalist(s)	Italy
4	Argentina
5	Netherlands
6	Brazil
7	Cuba
8	Australia
9	South Korea
10	Spain
11	United States
12	Egypt

2000 Men's Olympic champions

FR Yugoslavia
1st title

12–man roster
Vladimir Batez, Slobodan Kovač, Slobodan Boškan, Đula Mešter, Vasa Mijić, N. Grbić, V. Grbić, Andrija Gerić, Goran Vujević, Ivan Miljković, Veljko Petković, Igor Vušurović
Head coach
Zoran Gajić

== Medalists ==
Gold	Silver	Bronze
FR Yugoslavia Vladimir Batez; Slobodan Kovač; Slobodan Boškan; Đula Mešter; Vasa Mijić; Nikola Grbić; Vladimir Grbić; Andrija Gerić; Goran Vujević; Ivan Miljković; Veljko Petković; Igor Vušurović Head coach: Zoran Gajić	Russia Vadim Khamuttskikh; Ruslan Olikhver; Valeri Goryushev; Igor Shulepov; Aleksey Kazakov; Evgeni Mitkov; Sergey Tetyukhin; Roman Yakovlev; Konstantin Ushakov; Aleksandr Gerasimov; Ilya Savelev; Aleksey Kuleshov Head coach: Gennady Shipulin	Italy Andrea Gardini; Marco Meoni; Pasquale Gravina; Luigi Mastrangelo; Paolo Tofoli; Samuele Papi; Andrea Sartoretti; Marco Bracci; Simone Rosalba; Mirko Corsano; Andrea Giani; Alessandro Fei Head coach: Andrea Anastasi

== Awards ==
- Most valuable player
  (Netherlands) Bas van de Goor
- Best scorer
  (Argentina) Marcos Milinkovic
- Best spiker
  (Australia) Daniel Howard
- Best blocker
  (Federal Republic of Yugoslavia) Andrija Gerić
- Best server
  (Cuba) Osvaldo Hernández
- Best digger
  (Federal Republic of Yugoslavia) Vasa Mijić
- Best setter
  (Netherlands) Peter Blangé
- Best libero
  (Russia) Evgeni Mitkov
- Best receiver
  (Argentina) Pablo Meana

== See also ==
- Women's Olympic Tournament
