= Beilun Gymnasium =

Sports venue in Ningbo, China

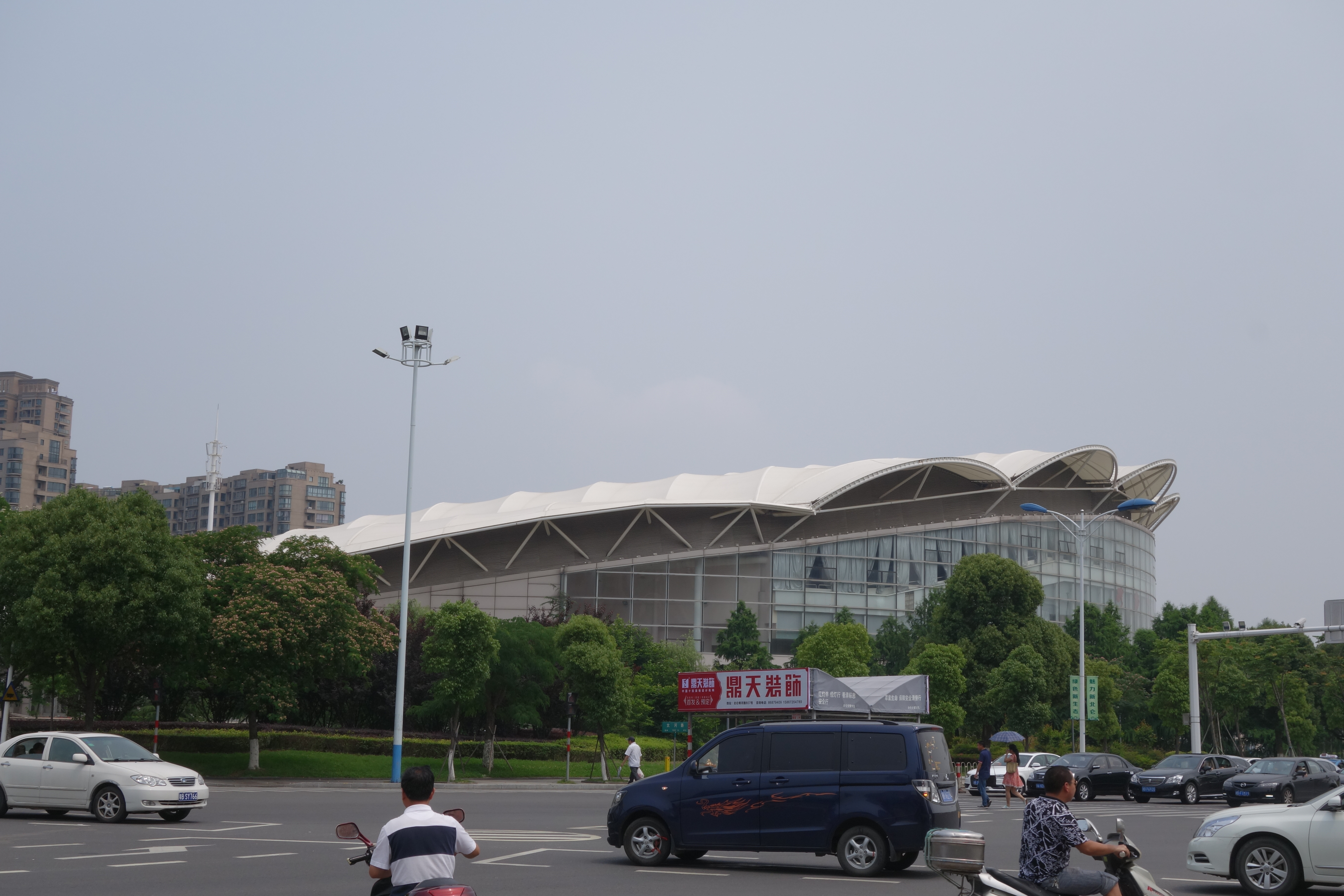
- Beilun Gymnasium
- Interactive map of Beilun Gymnasium
- Full name: Beilun Gymnasium
- Location: Ningbo, China
- Coordinates: 29°53′58″N 121°49′55″E
- Capacity: 8,000

Tenant
- FIVB Nations League (2005-present)

Beilun Gymnasium (Chinese: 北仑区体艺中心) is an indoor sporting arena located in Ningbo, China. Construction began at the end of 2002, was completed in April 2005, with the venue officially opening on May 1 of the same year.

The maximum capacity of the arena is 8,000 spectators, fixed seats are 4,000. It hosts indoor sporting events such as basketball and volleyball matches, and also hosts concerts. It hosted the final round of the FIVB World Grand Prix 2010 and FIVB World Grand Prix 2012.
