= Diving at the 1990 Commonwealth Games =

- Venue: West Auckland Swimming Centre
- Location: Auckland, New Zealand
- Dates: 24 January – 3 February 1990

Diving at the 1990 Commonwealth Games was the 14th appearance of Diving at the Commonwealth Games. Competition featured six diving events, held in Auckland, New Zealand, from 24 January to 3 February 1990.

The events were held at the West Auckland Swimming Centre on Alderman Drive in Henderson. The venue had been specifically built for the Games but faced late issues relating to the 3,200 grandstand seating. It was however described as technologically advanced with a variable floor and movable bulkhead.

Australia topped the medal table with three gold medals.

== Medal table ==
* Host nation (New Zealand)

| Rank | Nation | Gold | Silver | Bronze | Total |
|---|---|---|---|---|---|
| 1 | Australia | 3 | 1 | 2 | 6 |
| 2 | Canada | 2 | 4 | 3 | 9 |
| 3 | Wales | 1 | 0 | 0 | 1 |
| 4 | Zimbabwe | 0 | 1 | 0 | 1 |
| 5 | New Zealand* | 0 | 0 | 1 | 1 |
| Totals (5 entries) | | 6 | 6 | 6 | 18 |

== Medallists ==
Men

| Event | Gold | Silver | Bronze |
|---|---|---|---|
| 1 m springboard | Russell Butler; Australia | David Bédard; Canada | Simon McCormack; Australia |
| 3 m springboard | Craig Rogerson; Australia | Mark Rourke; Canada | Larry Flewwelling; Canada |
| 10 m platform | Bob Morgan; Wales4 | David Bédard; Canada | Bruno-Michel Fournier; Canada |

Women

| Event | Gold | Silver | Bronze |
|---|---|---|---|
| 1 m springboard | Mary DePiero; Canada | Tracy Cox; Zimbabwe | Peta Taylor; Australia |
| 3 m springboard | Jenny Donnet; Australia | Barbara Bush; Canada | Nicky Cooney; New Zealand |
| 10 m platform | Anna Dacyshyn; Canada | April Adams; Australia | Paige Gordon; Canada |

== Results ==
Men

=== 1 m springboard ===
| Pos | Athlete | Time |
|---|---|---|
| 1 | (Australia) Russell Butler | 583.65 |
| 2 | (Canada) David Bédard | 547.35 |
| 3 | (Australia) Simon McCormack | 546.87 |
| 4 | (Australia) Michael Murphy | 544.86 |
| 5 | (Canada) Larry Flewwelling | 540.15 |
| 6 | (Wales) Bob Morgan | 537.18 |
| 7 | (England) Jeffrey Arbon | 493.74 |
| 8 | (England) Jason Statham | 487.26 |
| 9 | (England) Tony Ally | 480.21 |
| 10 | (Canada) Mark Rourke | 466.53 |
| 11 | (New Zealand) Antony Young | 424.11 |
| 12 | (Scotland) Peter Smith | dnf |

=== 3 m springboard ===
| Pos | Athlete | Time |
|---|---|---|
| 1 | (Australia) Craig Rogerson | 594.84 |
| 2 | (Canada) Mark Rourke | 569.97 |
| 3 | (Canada) Larry Flewwelling | 569.79 |
| 4 | (Australia) Michael Murphy | 563.91 |
| 5 | (Australia) Graem Banks | 554.25 |
| 6 | (Canada) David Bédard | 553.23 |
| 7 | (Wales) Bob Morgan | 547.26 |
| 8 | (England) Jeffrey Arbon | 531.24 |
| 9 | (England) Tony Ally | 516.03 |
| 10 | (Scotland) Peter Smith | 491.52 |
| 11 | (England) Jason Statham | 479.25 |
| 12 | (Scotland) Stephen Forrest | 459.48 |
| 13 | (New Zealand) Antony Young | 389.31 |

=== 10 m platform ===
| Pos | Athlete | Time |
|---|---|---|
| 1 | (Wales) Bob Morgan | 639.84 |
| 2 | (Canada) David Bédard | 555.54 |
| 3 | (Canada) Bruno-Michel Fournier | 544.50 |
| 4 | (Australia) Craig Rogerson | 539.16 |
| 5 | (Australia) Michael Murphy | 511.35 |
| 6 | (Canada) William Hayes | 490.65 |
| 7 | (England) Jeffrey Arbon | 487.62 |
| 8 | (Australia) Simon McCormack | 485.91 |
| 9 | (Scotland) Stephen Forrest | 444.54 |
| 10 | (England) Jason Statham | 416.64 |
| 11 | (England) Tony Ally | 412.11 |

Women

=== 1 m springboard ===
| Pos | Athlete | Time |
|---|---|---|
| 1 | (Canada) Mary DePiero | 443.28 |
| 2 | (Zimbabwe) Tracy Cox | 423.93 |
| 3 | (Australia) Peta Angela Taylor | 418.71 |
| 4 | (Canada) Barb Bush | 416.82 |
| 5 | (Australia) Jenny Donnet | 414.54 |
| 6 | (Canada) Paige Gordon | 406.65 |
| 7 | (Wales) Olivia Clark | 393.30 |
| 8 | (New Zealand) Nicky Cooney | 388.14 |
| 9 | (England) Naomi Bishop | 385.11 |

=== 3 m springboard ===
| Pos | Athlete | Time |
|---|---|---|
| 1 | (Australia) Jenny Donnet | 491.79 |
| 2 | (Canada) Barb Bush | 458.43 |
| 3 | (New Zealand) Nicky Cooney | 457.29 |
| 4 | (Zimbabwe) Tracy Cox | 451.44 |
| 5 | (Australia) Peta Angela Taylor | 444.81 |
| 6 | (Canada) Mary DePiero | 437.70 |
| 7 | (Canada) Paige Gordon | 435.15 |
| 8 | (England) Naomi Bishop | 430.44 |
| 9 | (Wales) Olivia Clark | 396.75 |
| 10 | (Australia) April Adams | 394.83 |
| 11 | (New Zealand) Tania Paterson | 369.06 |

=== 10 m platform ===
| Pos | Athlete | Time |
|---|---|---|
| 1 | (Canada) Anna Dacyshyn | 391.68 |
| 2 | (Australia) April Adams | 380.49 |
| 3 | (Canada) Paige Gordon | 380.43 |
| 4 | (England) Lesley Ward | 353.85 |
| 5 | (England) Susan Ryan | 331.17 |
| 6 | (New Zealand) Tania Paterson | 329.16 |
| 7 | (New Zealand) Ginine Flynn | 314.34 |
| 8 | (Canada) Angela Borthwick | 311.55 |
| 9 | (Wales) Olivia Clark | 310.02 |
| 10 | (Australia) Vanessa Baker | 307.02 |
