= Diving at the 1991 World Aquatics Championships – Women's 10 metre platform =

The women's 10 metre platform event was contested for the sixth time at the World Aquatics Championships during the 1991 edition, held in Perth, Western Australia.

The competition was split into two phases: with a preliminary round, where the twelve divers with the highest scores advanced to the final. In the last round the remaining divers performed a set of dives to determine the final ranking. There were a total number of 25 competitors.

== Results ==
Green denotes finalists

Rank	Diver	Nationality	Preliminary		Final	
Rank	Diver	Nationality	Points	Rank	Points	Rank
1st place, gold medalist(s)	Fu Mingxia	China	406.80	2	426.51	1
2nd place, silver medalist(s)	Yelena Miroshina	Soviet Union	355.95	9	402.87	2
3rd place, bronze medalist(s)	Wendy Williams	United States	402.15	3	400.23	3
4	Xu Yanmei	China	435.03	1	399.12	4
5	Kim Chun-ok	North Korea	390.93	4	377.76	5
6	Inga Afonina	Soviet Union	385.50	6	376.74	6
7	Doris Pecher	Germany	367.17	7	376.47	7
8	Monika Kühn	Germany	346.98	12	376.17	8
9	April Adams	Australia	386.58	5	369.51	9
10	Vyninka Arlow	Australia	352.08	10	347.85	10
11	Cokey Smith	United States	365.04	8	340.65	11
12	Kamilla Gamme	Norway	349.71	11	329.55	12
13	Anna Dacyshyn	Canada	346.98	12	326.10	13
14	Veronica Ribot	Argentina	344.07	14		
15	Angela Northwick	Canada	333.81	15		
16	Cristina Millan	Mexico	331.77	16		
17	Yvonne Kostenberger	Switzerland	327.72	17		
18	Ioana Voicu	Romania	325.20	18		
19	María José Alcalá	Mexico	323.85	19		
20	Kang Hyon-suk	North Korea	320.58	20		
21	Tania Paterson	New Zealand	310.62	21		
22	Christiane Rappaz	Switzerland	302.52	22		
23	Luisella Bisello	Italy	297.75	23		
24	Ann-Sofie Rylander	Sweden	296.13	24		
25	Silvana Neitzke	Brazil	260.85	25		

== See also ==
- Diving at the 1988 Summer Olympics
- Diving at the 1992 Summer Olympics
