= Diving at the 1992 Summer Olympics – Women's 3 metre springboard =

Women's 3 metre springboard at the Games of the XXV Olympiad

Medalists
1st place, gold medalist(s)		Gao Min	China
2nd place, silver medalist(s)		Irina Lashko	Unified Team
3rd place, bronze medalist(s)		Brita Baldus	Germany

The Women's 3 metre Springboard, also reported as springboard diving, was one of four diving events on the Diving at the 1992 Summer Olympics programme.

The competition was split into two phases:

1. Preliminary round
  The twelve divers with the highest scores advanced to the final.
2. Final
  Divers performed a set of dives to determine the final ranking.

== Results ==
Rank	Diver	Nation	Preliminary		Final
Rank	Diver	Nation	Points	Rank	Points
1st place, gold medalist(s)	Gao Min	China	309.75	3	572.40
2nd place, silver medalist(s)	Irina Lashko	Unified Team	334.89	1	514.14
3rd place, bronze medalist(s)	Brita Baldus	Germany	312.90	2	503.07
4	Heidemarie Bártová	Czechoslovakia	286.14	7	491.49
5	Julie Ovenhouse	United States	291.48	5	477.84
6	Vera Ilyina	Unified Team	290.46	6	470.67
7	Simona Koch	Germany	281.46	10	468.96
8	Mary DePiero	Canada	278.76	12	449.49
9	Karen LaFace	United States	279.06	11	447.75
10	Verónica Ribot	Argentina	282.54	9	447.42
11	Yuki Motobuchi	Japan	301.23	4	443.76
12	Julia Cruz	Spain	282.69	8	436.47
13	Tracy Cox-Smyth	Zimbabwe	277.95	13	Did not advance
14	Daphne Jongejans	Netherlands	277.29	14	Did not advance
15	Jennifer Donnet	Australia	272.64	15	Did not advance
16	María Elena Romero	Mexico	269.34	16	Did not advance
17	Tan Shuping	China	269.10	17	Did not advance
18	Ágnes Gerlach	Hungary	265.86	18	Did not advance
19	Naomi Bishop	Great Britain	261.81	19	Did not advance
20	Ionica Tudor	Romania	258.15	20	Did not advance
21	Evelyne Boisvert	Canada	258.09	21	Did not advance
22	Rachel Wilkes	Australia	254.31	22	Did not advance
23	Karla Goltman	Argentina	254.28	23	Did not advance
24	Luisella Bisello	Italy	249.36	24	Did not advance
25	Ana Ayala	Mexico	249.03	25	Did not advance
26	Eleni Stavridou	Greece	240.42	26	Did not advance
27	Catherine Maliev-Aviolat	Switzerland	239.49	27	Did not advance
28	Kim Myong-son	North Korea	232.65	28	Did not advance
29	Kim Hye-ok	North Korea	206.64	29	Did not advance

== See also ==
- Diving at the 1991 World Aquatics Championships – Women's 1 metre springboard
- Diving at the 1991 World Aquatics Championships – Women's 3 metre springboard

== Sources ==
- Ed. Romà Cuyàs (ed.). Official Report of the Games of the XXV Olympiad: The Results (pdf) (in Spanish, Catalan, French, and English). Barcelona: COOB'92, S.A. (Barcelona'92 Olympic Organising Committee). pp. p. 383. ISBN 84-7868-283-X. OCLC 29247440.
