= Diving at the 1991 World Aquatics Championships – Women's 1 metre springboard =

The Women's 1m Springboard event was contested for the first time at the World Aquatics Championships during the 1991 edition, held in Perth, Western Australia.

The competition was split into two phases, with a preliminary round, where the twelve divers with the highest scores advanced to the final. In the last round divers performed a set of dives to determine the final ranking.

== Final ==
RANK	FINAL	SCORE
	Gao Min (CHN)	478.26
	Wendy Lucero (USA)	467.82
	Heidemarie Bártová (TCH)	449.76
4.	Irina Lashko (URS)	446.82
5.	Mary DePiero (CAN)	421.89
6.	Jodie Rogers (AUS)	421.38
7.	Yu Xiaoling (CHN)	418.23
8.	Julie Ovenhouse (USA)	415.74
9.	Dörte Lindner (GER)	412.59
10.	Yuki Motobuchi (JPN)	407.37
11.	Daphne Jongejans (NED)	402.78
12.	Barbara Bush (CAN)	393.87

== Non-Qualifiers ==
RANK	FINAL	SCORE
13.	Luisella Bisello (ITA)	389.58
14.	Tracy Cox (ZIM)	385.17
15.	Kerstin Häffner (GER)	380.61
16.	Jessica Ayala (MEX)	372.15
17.	Catherine Aviolat (SUI)	371.07
18.	María Alcalá (MEX)	365.25
19.	Julia Cruz (ESP)	347.94
20.	Ann-Sofie Rylander (SWE)	342.87
21.	Yvonne Kostenberger (SUI)	331.95
22.	Maria Martins (BRA)	322.60
23.	Nani Suryani (INA)	240.90
24.	Karla Goltman (ARG)	230.30

== See also ==
- Diving at the 1988 Summer Olympics
- Diving at the 1992 Summer Olympics
