= Diving at the 1991 World Aquatics Championships – Women's 3 metre springboard =

The Women's 3m Springboard event was contested for the sixth time at the World Aquatics Championships during the 1991 edition, held in Perth, Western Australia.

The competition was split into two phases: with a preliminary round, where the twelve divers with the highest scores advanced to the final. In the last round the remaining divers perform a set of dives to determine the final ranking. There were a total number of 21 competitors.

== Final ==
RANK	FINAL	SCORE
	Gao Min (CHN)	539.01
	Irina Lashko (URS)	524.70
	Brita Baldus (GER)	503.73
4.	Lu Haisong (CHN)	499.71
5.	Daphne Jongejans (NED)	492.99
6.	Heidemarie Bártová (TCH)	467.52
7.	Julie Ovenhouse (USA)	461.67
8.	Katrin Bensing (GER)	455.43
9.	Tracy Cox (ZIM)	454.23
10.	Krista Wilson (USA)	453.69
11.	Mary DePiero (CAN)	444.51
12.	Evelyne Boisvert (CAN)	440.61

== Non-Qualifiers ==
RANK	FINAL	SCORE
13.	Yuki Motobuchi (JPN)	432.42
14.	Rachel Wilkes (AUS)	430.62
15.	Ágnes Gerlach (HUN)	422.88
16.	Jodie Rogers (AUS)	420.15
17.	María Alcalá (MEX)	412.44
18.	Julia Cruz (ESP)	410.40
19.	Verónica Ribot (ARG)	409.44
20.	Yelena Miroshina (URS)	405.90
21.	Kang Hyon-Suk (PRK)	405.87

== See also ==
- Diving at the 1988 Summer Olympics
- Diving at the 1992 Summer Olympics
