= Diving at the 1992 Summer Olympics – Women's 10 metre platform =

Women's 10 metre platform at the Games of the XXV Olympiad
- Venue: Piscina Municipal de Montjuïc
- Date: 26–27 July 1992
- Competitors: 28 from 17 nations

Medalists
1st place, gold medalist(s)		Fu Mingxia	China
2nd place, silver medalist(s)		Yelena Miroshina	Unified Team
3rd place, bronze medalist(s)		Mary Ellen Clark	United States

The Women's 10 metre Platform, also known as platform diving, was one of four diving events during the Diving programme of 1992 Summer Olympics. It was held at Piscina Municipal de Montjuïc in Barcelona, Spain.

The competition was split into two phases:

1. Preliminary round – Sunday, 26 July
  Divers performed a set of six dives; the twelve divers with the highest scores advanced to the final.
2. Final round – Monday, 27 July
  Divers performed a set of eight dives to determine the final ranking.

== Results ==
Rank	Diver	Nation	Preliminary		Final
Rank	Diver	Nation	Points	Rank	Points
1st place, gold medalist(s)	Fu Mingxia	China	361.77	1	461.43
2nd place, silver medalist(s)	Yelena Miroshina	Unified Team	310.32	3	411.63
3rd place, bronze medalist(s)	Mary Ellen Clark	United States	329.85	2	401.91
4	Zhu Jinhong	China	297.00	6	400.56
5	Inga Afonina	Unified Team	293.94	7	398.43
6	María Alcalá	Mexico	309.39	4	394.35
7	Ellen Owen	United States	299.52	5	392.10
8	Verónica Ribot	Argentina	292.26	9	384.03
9	Ioana Voicu	Romania	288.87	12	369.87
10	Vyninka Arlow	Australia	289.14	11	365.88
11	April Adams	Australia	290.73	10	342.39
12	Hayley Allen	Great Britain	292.77	8	317.85
13	Macarena Alexanderson	Mexico	286.59	13	Did not advance
14	Ute Wetzig	Germany	284.13	14	Did not advance
15	Clara Elena Ciocan	Romania	283.92	15	Did not advance
16	Paige Gordon	Canada	283.11	16	Did not advance
17	Anne Montminy	Canada	282.42	17	Did not advance
18	Kim Chun-ok	North Korea	282.36	18	Did not advance
19	Luisella Bisello	Italy	272.19	19	Did not advance
20	Monika Küehn	Germany	270.51	20	Did not advance
21	Ibolya Nagy	Hungary	269.52	21	Did not advance
22	Yvonne Köstenberger	Switzerland	264.81	22	Did not advance
23	Ryu Un-sil	North Korea	262.56	23	Did not advance
24	Tania Paterson	New Zealand	254.04	24	Did not advance
25	Lesley Ward	Great Britain	242.16	25	Did not advance
26	Yuki Motobuchi	Japan	239.01	26	Did not advance
27	Brigitta Cserba	Hungary	236.10	27	Did not advance
28	Silvana Neitzke	Brazil	230.70	28	Did not advance

== Sources ==
- Ed. Romà Cuyàs (ed.). Official Report of the Games of the XXV Olympiad: The Results (pdf) (in Spanish, Catalan, French, and English). Barcelona: COOB'92, S.A. (Barcelona'92 Olympic Organising Committee). pp. p. 383. ISBN 84-7868-283-X. OCLC 29247440.
