= Diving at the 1988 Summer Olympics – Women's 3 metre springboard =

Women's 3 metre springboard at the Games of the XXIV Olympiad

Medalists
1st place, gold medalist(s)		Gao Min	China
2nd place, silver medalist(s)		Li Qing	China
3rd place, bronze medalist(s)		Kelly McCormick	United States

The women's 3 metre springboard, also reported as springboard diving, was one of four diving events on the Diving at the 1988 Summer Olympics programme.

The competition was split into two phases:

1. Preliminary round (24 September)
  Divers performed ten dives. The twelve divers with the highest scores advanced to the final.
2. Final (25 September)
  Divers performed another set of ten dives and the score here obtained determined the final ranking.

== Results ==
Rank	Diver	Nation	Preliminary		Final
Rank	Diver	Nation	Points	Rank	Points
1st place, gold medalist(s)	Gao Min	China	539.67	1	580.23
2nd place, silver medalist(s)	Li Qing	China	501.39	2	534.33
3rd place, bronze medalist(s)	Kelly McCormick	United States	473.73	5	533.19
4	Irina Lashko	Soviet Union	488.43	3	526.65
5	Marina Babkova	Soviet Union	456.42	8	506.43
6	Wendy Lucero	United States	477.99	4	498.81
7	Brita Baldus	East Germany	464.01	6	479.19
8	Daphne Jongejans	Netherlands	461.85	7	465.45
9	Debbie Fuller	Canada	453.48	9	450.30
10	Jennifer Donnet	Australia	433.17	11	432.81
11	Barbara Bush	Canada	434.34	10	429.18
12	Tracy Cox-Smyth	Zimbabwe	430.86	12	417.42
13	Anita Rossing	Sweden	414.63	13	Did not advance
14	Verónica Ribot	Argentina	405.87	14	Did not advance
15	Yuki Motobuchi	Japan	404.76	15	Did not advance
16	Beatrice Bürki	Switzerland	400.32	16	Did not advance
17	Anke Mühlbauer	West Germany	400.26	17	Did not advance
18	Carolyn Roscoe	Great Britain	399.87	18	Did not advance
19	Angela Ribeiro	Brazil	396.51	19	Did not advance
20	María José Alcalá	Mexico	392.16	20	Did not advance
21	Masako Asada	Japan	380.94	21	Did not advance
22	Katalin Haász	Hungary	378.27	22	Did not advance
23	Elke Heinrichs	West Germany	374.46	23	Did not advance
24	Kim Eun-hui	South Korea	357.96	24	Did not advance
25	Ágnes Gerlach	Hungary	355.14	25	Did not advance
26	Naomi Bishop	Great Britain	349.44	26	Did not advance
27	Lori Roberts	Bahamas	292.95	27	Did not advance
-	Kamilla Gamme	Norway	DNS	-	Did not advance

== Sources ==
- Official Report of the Games of the XXIVth Olympiad Seoul, 1988 - Volume 2: Competition Summary and Results (pdf) (in English and French). Seoul: Seoul Olympic Organizing Committee. 1989. pp. pp. 582–6. OCLC 23924033.
