= Diving at the 1994 Commonwealth Games =

- Venue: Saanich Aquatic Complex, Saanich Commonwealth Place
- Location: Victoria, Canada
- Dates: 18 to 28 August 1994

Diving at the 1994 Commonwealth Games was the 15th appearance of Diving at the Commonwealth Games. Competition featured six diving events, held in Victoria, Canada, from 18 to 28 August 1994.

The events were held at the Saanich Aquatic Complex, at Saanich Commonwealth Place, on 4636 Elk Lake Drive in Saanich. The centre was constructed in 1993, specifically with the Games in mind and cost $22 million.

Canada topped the medal table with four gold medals.

== Medal table ==
* Host nation (Canada)

Rank	Nation	Gold	Silver	Bronze	Total
1	Canada*	4	2	4	10
2	Australia	2	2	1	5
3	Zimbabwe	0	1	1	2
4	Wales	0	1	0	1
Totals (4 entries)		6	6	6	18

== Medallists ==
=== Men ===
Event	Gold	Silver	Bronze
1 m springboard	Jason Napper; Canada	Michael Murphy; Australia	Evan Stewart; Zimbabwe
3 m springboard	Michael Murphy; Australia	Evan Stewart; Zimbabwe	Jason Napper; Canada
10 m platform	Michael Murphy; Australia	Bob Morgan; Wales	Claude Villeneuve; Canada

=== Women ===
Event	Gold	Silver	Bronze
1 m springboard	Annie Pelletier; Canada	Jodie Rogers; Australia	Mary DePiero; Canada
3 m springboard	Annie Pelletier; Canada	Paige Gordon; Canada	Jodie Rogers; Australia
10 m platform	Anne Montminy; Canada	Paige Gordon; Canada	Myriam Boileau; Canada

== Men's results ==
=== 1 metre springboard ===
Rank	Name	Score
	Jason Napper (CAN)	364.08
	Michael Murphy (AUS)	363.18
	Evan Stewart (ZIM)	357.78
4	Bob Morgan (WAL)	337.86
5	David Bédard (CAN)	324.39
6	Simon McCormack (AUS)	318.96
7	Tony Ally (ENG)	313.86
8	Lee-Jay Strifler (CAN)	311.52
9	Dean Pullar (AUS)	300.00
10	Mark Shipman (ENG)	297.36
11	Janaka Biyanwila (SRI)	290.70
12	Andrew Matthew (RSA)	263.40
13	Robert Costa (RSA)	262.86

=== 3 metre springboard ===
Rank	Name	Score
	Michael Murphy (AUS)	671.76
	Evan Stewart (ZIM)	625.86
	Jason Napper (CAN)	625.86
4	David Bédard (CAN)	598.92
5	Lee-Jay Strifler (CAN)	572.85
6	Dean Pullar (AUS)	550.44
7	Tony Ally (ENG)	538.71
8	Mark Shipman (ENG)	532.29
9	Janaka Biyanwila (SRI)	516.06
10	Robert Costa (RSA)	457.89
11	Andrew Matthew (RSA)	429.90

=== 10 metre platform ===
Rank	Name	Score
	Michael Murphy (AUS)	614.70
	Bob Morgan (WAL)	585.96
	Claude Villeneuve (CAN)	581.22
4	Tony Jasen (AUS)	555.39
5	Jeff Bacon (CAN)	554.40
6	Tony Ally (ENG)	530.76
7	Mark Shipman (ENG)	437.64
8	Janaka Biyanwila (SRI)	436.05

== Women's results ==
=== 1 metre springboard ===
Rank	Name	Score
	Annie Pelletier (CAN)	279.66
	Jodie Rogers (AUS)	252.72
	Mary DePiero (CAN)	245.34
4	Rachel Wilkes (AUS)	236.52
5	Tracy Cox (ZIM)	225.06
6	Kylie Walker (NZL)	218.46
7	Susan Ryan (ENG)	214.26
8	Debbie White (RSA)	209.82
9	Jane Smith (ENG)	197.13
10	Angela Clark (ZIM)	190.71
11	Victoria Stenning (ENG)	179.58

=== 3 metre springboard ===
Rank	Name	Score
	Annie Pelletier (CAN)	529.86
	Paige Gordon (CAN)	529.08
	Jodie Rogers (AUS)	474.81
4	Vanessa Baker (AUS)	466.77
5	Tracy Cox (ZIM)	459.54
6	Mary DePiero (CAN)	437.16
7	Rachel Wilkes (AUS)	425.85
8	Debbie White (RSA)	415.02
9	Kylie Walker (NZL)	408.30
10	Susan Ryan (ENG)	406.05
11	Angela Clark (ZIM)	378.93
12	Victoria Stenning (ENG)	378.15
13	Jane Smith (ENG)	340.47

=== 10 metre platform ===
Rank	Name	Score
	Anne Montminy (CAN)	428.58
	Paige Gordon (CAN)	414.36
	Myriam Boileau (CAN)	411.21
4	Vyninka Arlow (AUS)	410.58
5	Bindi Mansfield (AUS)	382.68
6	Lesley Ward (ENG)	382.50
7	Hayley Allen (ENG)	375.33
8	Vanessa Baker (AUS)	374.31
9	Tania Paterson (NZL)	371.55
10	Sally Freeman (ENG)	339.81
