= Diving at the 1991 World Aquatics Championships – Men's 10 metre platform =

The men's 10 metre platform event was contested for the sixth time at the World Aquatics Championships during the 1991 edition, held in Perth, Western Australia.

The competition was split into two phases: with a preliminary round, where the twelve divers with the highest scores advanced to the final. In the last round the remaining divers performed a set of dives to determine the final ranking. There were a total number of 25 competitors.

== Results ==
Green denotes finalists

Rank	Diver	Nationality	Preliminary		Final	
Rank	Diver	Nationality	Points	Rank	Points	Rank
1st place, gold medalist(s)	Sun Shuwei	China	614.67	1	626.79	1
2nd place, silver medalist(s)	Xiong Ni	China	566.55	6	603.81	2
3rd place, bronze medalist(s)	Giorgi Chogovadze	Soviet Union	539.37	9	580.68	3
4	Jan Hempel	Germany	556.74	7	569.37	4
5	Fernando Platas	Mexico	516.12	11	546.12	5
6	Bob Morgan	Great Britain	567.81	5	544.92	6
7	Matt Scoggin	United States	588.45	3	513.00	7
8	Pat Evans	United States	583.11	4	508.89	8
9	Michael Kühne	Germany	548.13	8	502.86	9
10	Bruno Fournier	Canada	513.54	12	499.86	10
11	Craig Rogerson	Australia	520.65	10	484.80	11
12	Vladimir Timoshinin	Soviet Union	593.64	2	482.10	12
13	Frédéric Pierre	France	492.96	13		
14	Michael Murphy	Australia	488.97	14		
15	Keita Kaneto	Japan	481.14	15		
16	Ole Johnny Aasen	Norway	480.15	16		
17	David Bédard	Canada	478.58	17		
18	Jeffrey Arbon	Great Britain	476.58	18		
19	Jon Grunde Vegard	Norway	472.74	19		
20	Rafael Álvarez	Spain	467.64	20		
21	Jorge Mondragón	Mexico	466.50	21		
22	Song Yung-il	North Korea	431.04	22		
23	Alessandro de Botton	Italy	430.02	23		
24	José Miguel Gil	Spain	415.95	24		
25	Jürgen Richter	Austria	410.58	25		

== See also ==
- Diving at the 1988 Summer Olympics
- Diving at the 1992 Summer Olympics
