= Romania at the 1992 Summer Olympics =

- IOC code: ROU (ROM used at these Games)
- NOC: Romanian Olympic Committee

in Barcelona
- Competitors: 173 (105 men and 68 women) in 18 sports
- Flag bearer: Costel Grasu
- Medals Ranked 14th: Gold 4 Silver 6 Bronze 8 Total 18

Summer Olympics appearances (overview)
- 1900; 1904–1920; 1924; 1928; 1932; 1936; 1948; 1952; 1956; 1960; 1964; 1968; 1972; 1976; 1980; 1984; 1988; 1992; 1996; 2000; 2004; 2008; 2012; 2016; 2020; 2024; 2028

Romania competed at the 1992 Summer Olympics in Barcelona, Spain. It was the first Summer Games for the nation after the fall of Communism in 1989. 172 competitors, 104 men and 68 women, took part in 128 events in 18 sports.

== Medalists ==
Romania finished in 14th position in the final medal rankings, with four gold medals and 18 medals overall.

Medal	Name	Sport	Event	Date
Gold	Dimitrie Popescu; Dumitru Răducanu; Iulică Ruican; Neculai Țaga; Viorel Talapan	Rowing	Men's coxed four	1 August
Gold	Lavinia Miloșovici	Gymnastics	Women's vault	1 August
Gold	Lavinia Miloșovici	Gymnastics	Women's floor	1 August
Gold	Elisabeta Lipă	Rowing	Women's single sculls	2 August
Silver	Cristina Bontaș; Gina Gogean; Vanda Hădărean; Lavinia Miloșovici; Maria Neculiță; Mirela Pașca	Gymnastics	Women's artistic team all-around	28 July
Silver	Veronica Cochela; Elisabeta Lipă	Rowing	Women's double sculls	1 August
Silver	Veronica Cochela; Anişoara Dobre; Doina Ignat; Constanța Pipotă	Rowing	Women's quadruple sculls	2 August
Silver	Adriana Bazon; Iulia Bobeică; Elena Georgescu; Victoria Lepădatu; Veronica Necula; Ioana Olteanu; Maria Pădurariu; Doina Robu; Doina Liliana Șnep	Rowing	Women's eight	2 August
Silver	Dănuț Dobre; Marin Gheorghe; Gabriel Marin; Vasile Măstăcan; Vasile Năstase; Valentin Robu; Iulică Ruican; Viorel Talapan; Ioan Vizitiu	Rowing	Men's eight	2 August
Silver	Alina Astafei	Athletics	Women's high jump	8 August
Bronze	Traian Cihărean	Weightlifting	Men's 52 kg	26 July
Bronze	Sorin Babii	Shooting	Men's 10 metre air pistol	28 July
Bronze	Ioan Grigoraș	Wrestling	Men's Greco-Roman 130 kg	29 July
Bronze	Lavinia Miloșovici	Gymnastics	Women's artistic individual all-around	30 July
Bronze	Cristina Bontaș	Gymnastics	Women's floor	1 August
Bronze	Dimitrie Popescu; Dumitru Răducanu; Neculai Țaga	Rowing	Men's coxed pair	2 August
Bronze	Laura Badea; Roxana Dumitrescu; Claudia Grigorescu; Reka Szabo; Elisabeta Tufan	Fencing	Women's team foil	4 August
Bronze	Leonard Doroftei	Boxing	Light welterweight	7 August

Medals by sport
Sport	1st place, gold medalist(s)	2nd place, silver medalist(s)	3rd place, bronze medalist(s)	Total
Athletics	0	1	0	1
Boxing	0	0	1	1
Fencing	0	0	1	1
Gymnastics	2	1	2	5
Rowing	2	4	1	7
Shooting	0	0	1	1
Weightlifting	0	0	1	1
Wrestling	0	0	1	1
Total	4	6	8	18

Medals by gender
Gender	1st place, gold medalist(s)	2nd place, silver medalist(s)	3rd place, bronze medalist(s)	Total
Male				
Female				
Total	4	6	8	18

== Competitors ==
The following is the list of number of competitors in the Games.

Sport	Men	Women	Total
Athletics	7	18	25
Badminton	1	0	1
Boxing	5	–	5
Canoeing	10	4	14
Diving	1	3	4
Fencing	10	5	15
Gymnastics	6	8	14
Handball	15	0	15
Judo	5	1	6
Modern pentathlon	1	–	1
Rowing	18	14	32
Shooting	4	1	5
Swimming	2	8	10
Table tennis	0	4	4
Tennis	3	2	5
Weightlifting	6	–	6
wrestling	11	–	11
Total	105	68	173

== Athletics ==
Men's 110m Hurdles

- Mircea Oaida

- Heats — 14.04 (→ did not advance)

Men's Long Jump

- Bogdan Tudor

- Qualification — 8.07 m
- Final — 7.61 m (→ 12th place)

Men's Discus Throw

- Costel Grasu

- Qualification — 63.06 m
- Final — 62.86 m (→ 4th place)

Men's Shot Put

- Gheorghe Gușet

- Qualification — 18.96 m (→ did not advance)

Women's 800 metres

- Ella Kovacs

- Heat — 1:59.88
- Semifinal — 2:00.89
- Final — 1:57.95 (→ 6th place)

- Leontina Salagean

- Heat — 2:01.44 (→ did not advance)

Women's 400m Hurdles

- Nicoleta Carutasu

- Heat — 57.18 (→ did not advance)

Women's Marathon

- Elena Murgoci — 3:01.46 (→ 32nd place)

Women's High Jump

- Galina Astafei

- Qualification — 1.92 m
- Final — 2.00 m (→ Silver Medal)

- Oana Musunoi

- Qualification — 1.86 m (→ did not advance)

Women's Long Jump

- Mirela Dulgheru

- Heat — 6.83 m
- Final — 6.71 m (→ 4th place)

- Marieta Ilcu

- Heat — 6.46 m (→ did not advance)

Women's Discus Throw

- Nicoleta Grasu

- Heat — 60.62m (→ did not advance)

- Manuela Tirneci

- Heat — 59.44m (→ did not advance)

- Cristina Boit

- Heat — 56.68m (→ did not advance)

Women's Heptathlon

- Petra Vaideanu

- Final result — 6152 points (→ 13th place)

== Boxing ==
Men's Light Flyweight (– 48 kg)

- Valentin Barbu

- First Round – Defeated Mohammed Haioun (ALG), 11:2
- Second Round – Defeated Tadahiro Sasaki (JPN), 10:7
- Quarterfinals – Lost to Jan Quast (GER), 7:15

== Diving ==
Men

Athlete	Event	Preliminaries		Final	
Athlete	Event	Points	Rank	Points	Rank
Gabriel Cherecheș	10m platform	327.72	20	Did not advance	

Women

Athlete	Event	Preliminaries		Final	
Athlete	Event	Points	Rank	Points	Rank
Clara Elena Ciocan	10m platform	283.92	15	Did not advance	
Ionica Tudor	3 m springboard	258.15	20	Did not advance	
Ioana Voicu	10m platform	288.87	12 Q	369.87	9

== Fencing ==
15 fencers, 10 men and 5 women represented Romania in 1992.

Men's épée

- Adrian Pop
- Gabriel Pantelimon
- Cornel Milan

Men's team épée

- Adrian Pop, Gabriel Pantelimon, Cornel Milan, Gheorghe Epurescu, Nicolae Mihăilescu

Men's sabre

- Daniel Grigore
- Vilmoș Szabo
- Alexandru Chiculiță

Men's team sabre

- Alexandru Chiculiță, Victor Găureanu, Daniel Grigore, Florin Lupeică, Vilmoș Szabo

Women's foil

- Reka Zsofia Lazăr-Szabo
- Claudia Grigorescu
- Elisabeta Guzganu-Tufan

Women's team foil

- Reka Zsofia Lazăr-Szabo, Claudia Grigorescu, Elisabeta Guzganu-Tufan, Laura Cârlescu-Badea, Roxana Dumitrescu

== Handball ==
=== Preliminary round ===
==== Group B ====
Team	Pld	W	D	L	GF	GA	GD	Points
Unified Team	5	5	0	0	121	98	+23	10
France	5	4	0	1	111	98	+13	8
Spain	5	3	0	2	97	98	−1	6
Romania	5	1	1	3	107	115	−8	3
Germany	5	1	1	3	97	103	−6	3
Egypt	5	0	0	5	92	113	−21	0

Results	Unified Team	(France)	(Spain)	(Romania)	(Germany)	(Egypt)
Unified Team		23–22	24–18	27–25	25–15	22–18
France	22–23		18–16	26–20	23–20	22–19
Spain	18–24	16–18		21–20	19–18	23–18
Romania	25–27	20–26	20–21		20–20	22–21
Germany	15–25	20–23	18–19	20–20		24–16
Egypt	18–22	19–22	18–23	21–22	16–24	

=== 7th/8th classification ===
August 7; 19:00	Romania	19–23	Hungary
August 7; 19:00		(13-9)

- Team roster

- Daniel Apostu
- Dumitru Berbece
- Mitica Bontas
- Alexandru Buligan
- Alexandru Dedu
- Marian Dumitru
- Robert Ioan Licu
- Ion Mocanu
- Costica Neagu
- Adi Daniel Popovici
- Ioan Rudi Prisacaru
- Ionel Radu
- Gheorghe-Titel Raduta
- Gabriel Sorin Toacsen
- Maricel Voinea
- Valentin Cristian Zaharia

- Head coach: Cezar Paul Nica

== Modern pentathlon ==
One male pentathlete represented Romania in 1992.

Individual

- Marian Gheorghe

== Rowing ==
Men's Coxless Pairs

- Vasile Tomoiagă and Dragoș Neagu

Men's Coxed Pairs

- Dimitrie Popescu, Nicolae Țaga and Dumitru Răducanu

Men's Coxless Fours

- Vasile Hanuseac, Nicolae Spîrcu, Florin Ene, and Ioan Snep

Men's Coxed Fours

- Viorel Talapan, Iulică Ruican, Dimitrie Popescu, Nicolae Țaga, and Dumitru Răducanu

Men's eight

- Ioan Vizitiu, Dănuț Dobre, Gabriel Marin, Iulică Ruican, Viorel Talapan, Vasile Năstase, Valentin Robu, Vasile Măstăcan, and Marin Gheorghe

Women's Single Sculls

- Elisabeta Oleniuc-Lipă

Women's Double Sculls

- Elisabeta Oleniuc-Lipă and Veronica Cogeanu-Cochela

Women's Coxless Pairs

- Doina Șnep-Bălan and Doina Robu

Women's Quadruple Sculls

- Constanța Burcică-Pipota, Vera Cochela, Anișoara Dobre-Bălan, and Doina Ignat — Rowing, Women's Quadruple Sculls

Women's Coxless Fours

- Victoria Lepădatu, Iulia Bobeică, Adriana Chelariu-Bazon, and Maria Pădurariu

Women's eight

- Adriana Bazon-Chelariu, Iulia Bobeica, Elena Georgescu, Victoria Lepădatu, Viorica Neculai, Ioana Olteanu, Maria Păduraru, and Doina Robu — Rowing, Women's Eights

== Swimming ==
Men's 200m Freestyle

- Robert Pinter

- Heat – 1:52.24 (→ did not advance, 25th place)

Men's 200m Butterfly

- Robert Pinter

- Heat – 1:59.59
- Final – 1:59.34 (→ 7th place)

Men's 200m Individual Medley

- Marian Satnoianu

- Heat – 2:06.45 (→ did not advance, 25th place)

Men's 400m Individual Medley

- Marian Satnoianu

- Heat – 4:26.33 (→ did not advance, 17th place)

Women's 50 m Freestyle

- Liliana Dobrescu

- Heat – 26.76 (→ did not advance, 21st place)

- Diana Ureche

- Heat – 26.96 (→ did not advance, 30th place)

Women's 100 m Freestyle

- Liliana Dobrescu

- Heat – 56.45
- B-Final – 56.17 (→ 10th place)

- Diana Ureche

- Heat – 58.83 (→ did not advance, 31st place)

Women's 200 m Freestyle

- Liliana Dobrescu

- Heat – 2:00.51
- Final – 2:00.48 (→ 5th place)

- Carla Negrea

- Heat – 2:03.16
- B-Final – 2:02.96 (→ 15th place)

Women's 400 m Freestyle

- Beatrice Coada

- Heat – 4:16.23
- B-Final – 4:14.90 (→ 12th place)

- Carla Negrea

- Heat – 4:17.00
- B-Final – 4:14.92 (→ 13th place)

Women's 800 m Freestyle

- Beatrice Coada

- Heat – 8:44.17 (→ did not advance, 10th place)

- Carla Negrea

- Heat – 8:48.36 (→ did not advance, 11th place)

Women's 100 m Backstroke

- Claudia Stanescu

- Heat – 1:04.44 (→ did not advance, 20th place)

Women's 200 m Backstroke

- Claudia Stanescu

- Heat – 2:18.39 (→ did not advance, 29th place)

Women's 200 m Breaststroke

- Beatrice Coada

- Heat – 2:34.97 (→ did not advance, 20th place)

Women's 100 m Butterfly

- Diana Ureche

- Heat – 1:02.72 (→ did not advance, 23rd place)

- Iuliana Pantilimon

- Heat – 1:04.07 (→ did not advance, 33rd place)

Women's 200 m Butterfly

- Iuliana Pantilimon

- Heat – 2:15.44
- B-Final – 2:14.95 (→ 14th place)

- Corina Dumitru

- Heat – 2:16.86 (→ did not advance, 21st place)

Women's 200 m Individual Medley

- Noemi Lung

- Heat – 2:18.12
- B-Final – 2:18.97 (→ 13th place)

Women's 400 m Individual Medley

- Beatrice Coada

- Heat – 4:48.12
- B-Final – 4:50.60 (→ 15th place)

- Noemi Lung

- Heat – 4:53.91 (→ did not advance, 18th place)

Women's 4 × 100 m Freestyle Relay

- Diana Ureche, Carla Negrea, Beatrice Coada, and Liliana Dobrescu

- Heat – 3:55.52 (→ did not advance, 12th place)

Women's 4 × 100 m Medley Relay

- Claudia Stanescu, Beatrice Coada, Diana Ureche, and Liliana Dobrescu

- Heat – 4:17.91 (→ did not advance, 12th place)

== Tennis ==
Men's Singles Competition

- Andrei Pavel

- First round — Lost to Carl-Uwe Steeb (Germany) 5-7, 2-6, 2-6

Men's Doubles Competition

- George Cosac and Dinu Pescariu

- First round — Defeated László Markovits and Sándor Noszály (Hungary) retired
- Second round — Defeated Omar Camporese and Diego Nargiso (Italy) 6-1, 4-6, 4-6, 6-4, 6-2
- Quarterfinals — Lost to Wayne Ferreira and Piet Norval (South Africa) 0-6, 3-6, 2-6

Women's Singles Competition

- Irina Spîrlea

- First Round – Lost to Arantxa Sánchez Vicario (Spain) 1-6, 3-6
