= Diving at the 1992 Summer Olympics – Men's 10 metre platform =

Men's 10 metre platform at the Games of the XXV Olympiad

Medalists
1st place, gold medalist(s)		Sun Shuwei	China
2nd place, silver medalist(s)		Scott Donie	United States
3rd place, bronze medalist(s)		Xiong Ni	China

The men's 10 metre platform, also reported as platform diving, was one of four diving events on the Diving at the 1992 Summer Olympics programme.

The competition was split into two phases:

1. Preliminary round
  The twelve divers with the highest scores advanced to the final.
2. Final
  Divers performed a set of dives to determine the final ranking.

== Results ==
Rank	Diver	Nation	Preliminary		Final
Rank	Diver	Nation	Points	Rank	Points
1st place, gold medalist(s)	Sun Shuwei	China	447.96	2	677.31
2nd place, silver medalist(s)	Scott Donie	United States	423.45	4	633.63
3rd place, bronze medalist(s)	Xiong Ni	China	453.87	1	600.15
4	Jan Hempel	Germany	426.27	3	574.17
5	Bob Morgan	Great Britain	384.09	11	568.59
6	Dmitri Sautin	Unified Team	389.28	9	565.95
7	Michael Kühne	Germany	393.21	6	558.54
8	Keita Kaneto	Japan	391.05	7	529.14
9	Rafael Álvarez	Spain	390.81	8	524.25
10	Matt Scoggin	United States	379.20	12	492.60
11	Alberto Acosta	Mexico	398.55	5	482.28
12	Craig Rogerson	Australia	388.83	10	458.43
13	Michael Murphy	Australia	371.88	13	Did not advance
14	Bruno Fournier	Canada	370.68	14	Did not advance
15	Jesús Mena	Mexico	370.47	15	Did not advance
16	Georgy Chogovadze	Unified Team	361.47	16	Did not advance
17	Alessandro de Botton	Italy	334.98	17	Did not advance
18	Isao Yamagishi	Japan	331.23	18	Did not advance
19	Frédéric Pierre	France	329.01	19	Did not advance
20	Gabriel Cherecheș	Romania	327.72	20	Did not advance
21	William Hayes	Canada	324.39	21	Did not advance
22	Grzegorz Kozdranski	Poland	322.83	22	Did not advance
23	Dario Di Fazio	Venezuela	317.04	23	Did not advance

== See also ==
- 1991 World Championships Men's 10 m Platform

== Sources ==
- Ed. Romà Cuyàs (ed.). Official Report of the Games of the XXV Olympiad: The Results (pdf) (in Spanish, Catalan, French, and English). Barcelona: COOB'92, S.A. (Barcelona'92 Olympic Organising Committee). pp. p. 382. ISBN 84-7868-283-X. OCLC 29247440.
