= Diving at the 1986 Commonwealth Games =

- Venue: Royal Commonwealth Pool
- Location: Edinburgh, Scotland
- Date: 24 July to 2 August 1986

Diving at the 1986 Commonwealth Games was the 13th appearance of Diving at the Commonwealth Games.

Competition featured four events and was held in Edinburgh, Scotland, from 24 July to 2 August 1986.

They events were held at the Royal Commonwealth Pool, which also hosted the events in 1970.

Australia topped the medal table by virtue of winning one more bronze medal than Canada.

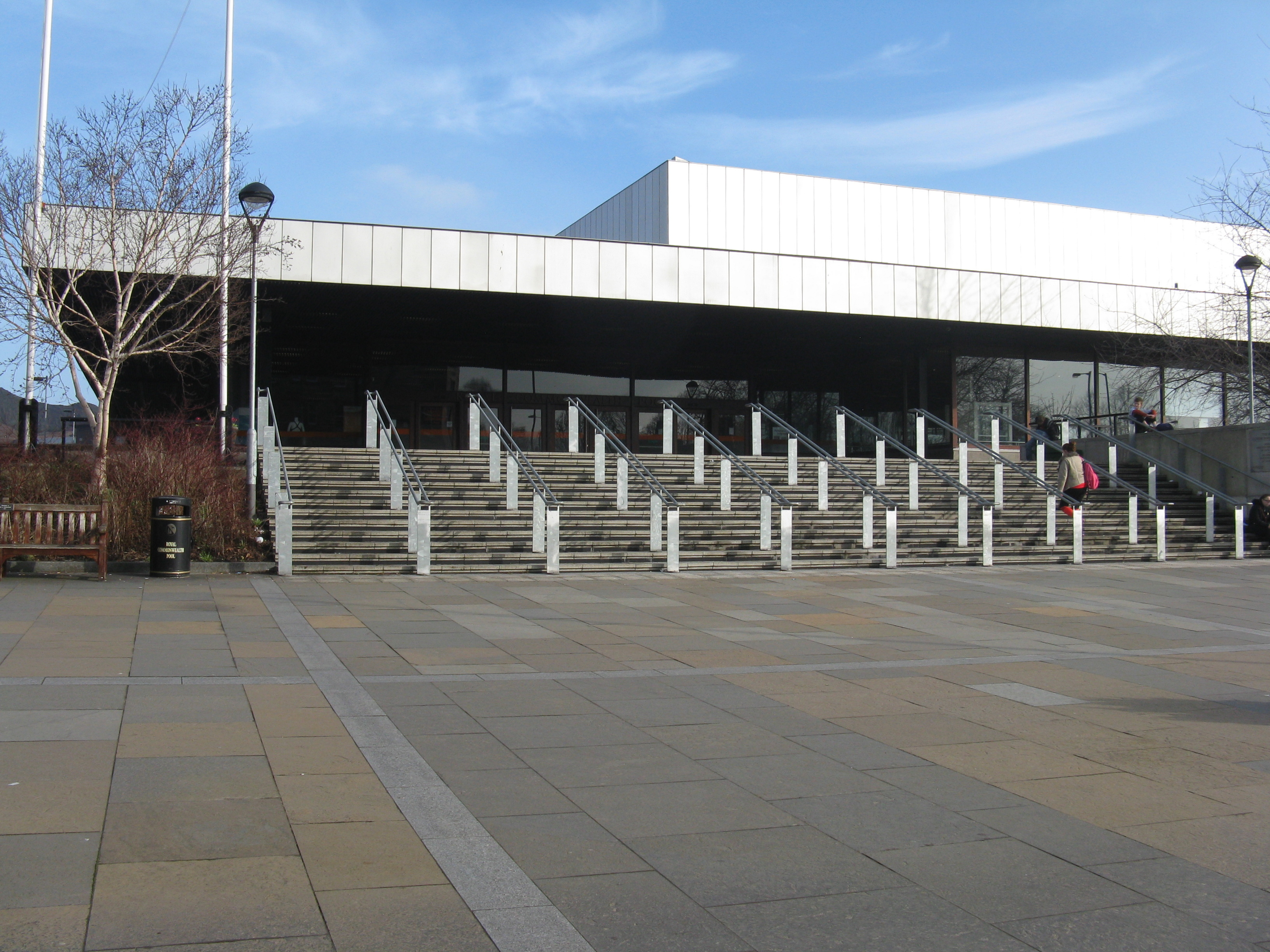
The Royal Commonwealth Pool

== Medal table ==
* Host nation (Scotland)

Rank	Nation	Gold	Silver	Bronze	Total
1	Australia	2	2	2	6
2	Canada	2	2	1	5
3	Wales	0	0	1	1
Totals (3 entries)		4	4	4	12

== Medallists ==
Men

Event	Gold		Silver		Bronze	
3 m springboard	Shaun Panayi; Australia	648.33	John Nash; Canada	647.64	Craig Rogerson; Australia	620.43
10 m platform	Craig Rogerson; Australia	600.87	David Bédard; Canada	576.81	Bob Morgan; Wales	561.54

Women

Event	Gold		Silver		Bronze	
3 m springboard	Debbie Fuller; Canada	513.09	Jenny Donnet; Australia	494.52	Kathy Keleman; Canada	484.65
10 m platform	Debbie Fuller; Canada	431.61	Valerie Beddoe; Australia	414.78	Julie Kent; Australia	411.13

== Finals ==
Men

=== 3 m springboard ===
Pos	Athlete	Time
1	(Australia) Shaun Ian Panayi	648.33
2	(Canada) John Nash	647.64
3	(Australia) Craig Rogerson	620.43
4	(Australia) Steve Foley	619.47
5	(Canada) Randy Sageman	615.99
6	(Wales) Bob Morgan	594.12
7	(Canada) David Bédard	585.24
8	(England) Nigel Stanton	577.26
9	(New Zealand) Raymond Vallance	528.21
10	(England) Jeffrey Arbon	522.09
11	(England) James Roose	505.98
12	(Wales) Andy Budd	490.77
13	(New Zealand) Mark Graham	478.14
14	(Scotland) Peter Smith	443.37
15	(Scotland) Stephen Forrest	400.86

=== 10 m platform ===
Pos	Athlete	Time
1	(Australia) Craig Rogerson	600.87
2	(Canada) David Bédard	576.81
3	(Wales) Bob Morgan	561.54
4	(Canada) John Nash	560.25
5	(Canada) Jeffrey Hirst	555.66
6	(England) Nigel Stanton	545.64
7	(Australia) Steve Foley	527.31
8	(Australia) Nathan Meade	509.97
9	(England) Jeffrey Arbon	479.82
10	(England) James Roose	449.85
11	(New Zealand) Raymond Vallance	449.37
12	(Scotland) Stephen Forrest	435.84

Women

=== 3 m springboard ===
Pos	Athlete	Time
1	(Canada) Debbie Fuller	513.09
2	(Australia) Jenny Donnet	494.52
3	(Canada) Kathy Kelemen	484.65
4	(Australia) Valerie Beddoe	481.59
5	(New Zealand) Nicky Cooney	469.62
6	(Australia) Julie Kent	451.47
7	(Canada) Jenny Tysdale	440.70
8	(England) Alison Childs	426.57
9	(England) Lisa Brace	414.36
10	(England) Carolyn Roscoe	387.21
11	(Scotland) Jane Ogden	311.73

=== 10 m platform ===
Pos	Athlete	Time
1	(Canada) Debbie Fuller	431.61
2	(Australia) Valerie Beddoe	414.78
3	(Australia) Julie Kent	411.18
4	(England) Rachel Spinks	395.43
5	(Canada) Jennifer McArton	389.46
6	(Canada) Jenny Tysdale	383.88
7	(England) Carolyn Roscoe	357.15
8	(Australia) Carol Gina Boots	346.41
9	(England) Lisa Brace	335.55
10	(Scotland) Jane Ogden	321.48
