= Commonwealth Games results index =

This Commonwealth Games results index is a list of links which forms an index which can be used to quickly find the required Wikipedia page containing the results of each Commonwealth Games sport in any year of interest. Previously these games were known as The British Empire Games (1930–1950), The British Empire and Commonwealth Games (1954–1966) and The British Commonwealth Games (1970–1974). Years appearing in grey are those for which there is no corresponding article.

== Archery ==
Archery competitions have been held twice in the history of the Games; first in 1982, and again in 2010.

1930 1934 1938 1950 1954 1958 1962 1966 1970 1974 1978 1982 1986 1990 1994 1998 2002 2006 2010 2014 2018 2022 2026

== Athletics ==
Athletics is a core sport of the Commonwealth Games, and has been contested at every edition.

1930 1934 1938 1950 1954 1958 1962 1966 1970 1974 1978 1982 1986 1990 1994 1998 2002 2006 2010 2014 2018 2022 2026

== Badminton ==
Badminton is an optional sport at the Commonwealth Games. The sport has been contested continuously since its introduction at the 1966 Games, but will not appear in 2026.

1930 1934 1938 1950 1954 1958 1962 1966 1970 1974 1978 1982 1986 1990 1994 1998 2002 2006 2010 2014 2018 2022 2026

== Basketball ==
Basketball is an optional sport at the Commonwealth Games, first introduced in its full court version in 2006, and its halfcourt '3x3' form in 2022.

1930 1934 1938 1950 1954 1958 1962 1966 1970 1974 1978 1982 1986 1990 1994 1998 2002 2006 2010 2014 2018 2022 2026

== Boxing ==
Boxing is an optional sport at the commonwealth Games, but has appeared in every edition of the event.

1930 1934 1938 1950 1954 1958 1962 1966 1970 1974 1978 1982 1986 1990 1994 1998 2002 2006 2010 2014 2018 2022 2026

== Cricket ==
Cricket is an optional sport at the Commonwealth Games which has appeared sporadically since its introduction in 1998

1930 1934 1938 1950 1954 1958 1962 1966 1970 1974 1978 1982 1986 1990 1994 1998 2002 2006 2010 2014 2018 2022 2026

== Cycling ==
Cycling is an optional sport at the Commonwealth Games, but has appeared in every edition of the event in at least one form with the exception of the initial Games in 1930.

1930 1934 1938 1950 1954 1958 1962 1966 1970 1974 1978 1982 1986 1990 1994 1998 2002 2006 2010 2014 2018 2022 2026

== Diving ==
1930 1934 1938 1950 1954 1958 1962 1966 1970 1974 1978 1982 1986 1990 1994 1998 2002 2006 2010 2014 2018 2022 2026

== Fencing ==
1930 1934 1938 1950 1954 1958 1962 1966 1970 1974 1978 1982 1986 1990 1994 1998 2002 2006 2010 2014 2018 2022 2026

== Gymnastics ==
1930 1934 1938 1950 1954 1958 1962 1966 1970 1974 1978 1982 1986 1990 1994 1998 2002 2006 2010 2014 2018 2022 2026

== Hockey ==
1930 1934 1938 1950 1954 1958 1962 1966 1970 1974 1978 1982 1986 1990 1994 1998 2002 2006 2010 2014 2018 2022 2026

== Judo ==
1930 1934 1938 1950 1954 1958 1962 1966 1970 1974 1978 1982 1986 1990 1994 1998 2002 2006 2010 2014 2018 2022 2026

== Lawn bowls ==
1930 1934 1938 1950 1954 1958 1962 1966 1970 1974 1978 1982 1986 1990 1994 1998 2002 2006 2010 2014 2018 2022 2026

== Netball ==
1930 1934 1938 1950 1954 1958 1962 1966 1970 1974 1978 1982 19861990 1998 2002 2006 2010 2014 2018 2022 2026

== Rowing ==
1930 1934 1938 1950 1954 1958 1962 1966 1970 1974 1978 1982 1986 1990 1994 1998 2002 2006 2010 2014 2018 2022 2026

== Rugby sevens ==
1930 1934 1938 1950 1954 1958 1962 1966 1970 1974 1978 1982 1986 1990 1994 1998 2002 2006 2010 2014 2018 2022 2026

== Shooting ==
1930 1934 1938 1950 1954 1958 1962 1966 1970 1974 1978 1982 1986 1990 1994 1998 2002 2006 2010 2014 2018 2022 2026

== Squash ==
1930 1934 1938 1950 1954 1958 1962 1966 1970 1974 1978 1982 1986 1990 1994 1998 2002 2006 2010 2014 2018 2022 2026

== Swimming ==
Swimming is a core sport of the Commonwealth Games and held in every edition of the event.

1930 1934 1938 1950 1954 1958 1962 1966 1970 1974 1978 1982 1986 1990 1994 1998 2002 2006 2010 2014 2018 2022 2026

== Synchronised swimming ==
1930 1934 1938 1950 1954 1958 1962 1966 1970 1974 1978 1982 1986 1990 1994 1998 2002 2006 2010 2014 2018 2022 2026

== Tennis ==
1930 1934 1938 1950 1954 1958 1962 1966 1970 1974 1978 1982 1986 1990 1994 1998 2002 2006 2010 2014 2018 2022 2026

== Triathlon ==
1930 1934 1938 1950 1954 1958 1962 1966 1970 1974 1978 1982 1986 1990 1994 1998 2002 2006 2010 2014 2018 2022 2026

== Weightlifting ==
1930 1934 1938 1950 1954 1958 1962 1966 1970 1974 1978 1982 1986 1990 1994 1998 2002 2006 2010 2014 2018 2022 2026

== Wrestling ==
1930 1934 1938 1950 1954 1958 1962 1966 1970 1974 1978 1982 1986 1990 1994 1998 2002 2006 2010 2014 2018 2022 2026
