= Diving at the 1988 Summer Olympics – Women's 10 metre platform =

Women's 10 metre platform at the Games of the XXIV Olympiad

Medalists
1st place, gold medalist(s)		Xu Yanmei	China
2nd place, silver medalist(s)		Michelle Mitchell	United States
3rd place, bronze medalist(s)		Wendy Williams	United States

The women's 10 metre platform, also reported as platform diving, was one of four diving events on the Diving at the 1988 Summer Olympics programme.

The competition was split into two phases:

1. Preliminary round (17 September)
  Divers performed eight dives. The twelve divers with the highest scores advanced to the final.
2. Final (18 September)
  Divers performed another set of eight dives and the score here obtained determined the final ranking.

== Results ==
Rank	Diver	Nation	Preliminary		Final
Rank	Diver	Nation	Points	Rank	Points
1st place, gold medalist(s)	Xu Yanmei	China	426.27	3	445.20
2nd place, silver medalist(s)	Michele Mitchell	United States	426.45	2	436.95
3rd place, bronze medalist(s)	Wendy Williams	United States	402.54	4	400.44
4	Anzhela Stasyulevich	Soviet Union	401.04	5	386.22
5	Chen Xiaodan	China	456.45	1	384.15
6	Yelena Miroshina	Soviet Union	399.27	6	381.93
7	Kamilia Gamme	Norway	356.73	11	366.45
8	Silke Abicht	East Germany	393.99	7	350.61
9	María José Alcalá	Mexico	359.64	10	349.41
10	Debbie Fuller	Canada	366.42	9	340.89
11	Ildikó Kelemen	Hungary	355.17	12	322.59
12	Verónica Ribot	Argentina	377.70	8	297.18
13	Wendy Fuller	Canada	347.73	13	Did not advance
14	Julie Kent	Australia	339.96	14	Did not advance
15	Monika Kühn	West Germany	335.88	15	Did not advance
16	Yuki Motobuchi	Japan	333.45	16	Did not advance
17	Masako Asada	Japan	327.93	17	Did not advance
18	Carolyn Roscoe	Great Britain	322.35	18	Did not advance
19	Doris Pecher	West Germany	310.53	19	Did not advance
20	Kim Eun-hee	South Korea	284.25	20	Did not advance

== Sources ==
- Official Report of the Games of the XXIVth Olympiad Seoul, 1988 - Volume 2: Competition Summary and Results (pdf) (in English and French). Seoul: Seoul Olympic Organizing Committee. 1989. pp. pp. 586–8. OCLC 23924033.
