= Diving at the 1998 Commonwealth Games =

- Venue: National Aquatic Centre, Bukit Jalil
- Location: Kuala Lumpur, Malaysia
- Dates: 11 to 21 September 1998

Diving at the 1998 Commonwealth Games was the 16th appearance of Diving at the Commonwealth Games. Competition was held in Kuala Lumpur, Malaysia, from 11 to 21 September 1998.

There were six medal events: three events for both men and women. Australia topped the medal table by virtue of winning three gold medals.

National Aquatic Centre in Bukit Jalil

== Medal table ==
* Host nation (Malaysia)

Rank	Nation	Gold	Silver	Bronze	Total
1	Australia	3	4	1	8
2	Canada	2	2	3	7
3	Zimbabwe	1	0	0	1
4	England	0	0	2	2
Totals (4 entries)		6	6	6	18

== Medallists ==
Event	Gold	Silver	Bronze
1 m springboard	Evan Stewart; Zimbabwe	Dean Pullar; Australia	Robert Newbery; Australia
3 m springboard	Shannon Roy; Australia	Dean Pullar; Australia	Tony Ally; England
10 m platform	Alexandre Despatie; Canada	Robert Newbery; Australia	Leon Taylor; England

=== Women's events ===
Event	Gold	Silver	Bronze
1 m springboard	Chantelle Michell; Australia	Blythe Hartley; Canada	Eryn Bulmer; Canada
3 m springboard	Eryn Bulmer; Canada	Chantelle Michell; Australia	Myriam Boileau; Canada
10 m platform	Vyninka Arlow; Australia	Myriam Boileau; Canada	Anne Montminy; Canada

== Men's Results ==
=== 1m Springboard ===
- Held on 18 September 1998

RANK	FINAL	SCORE
	Evan Stewart (ZIM)	384,66
	Dean Pullar (AUS)	369,15
	Robert Newbery (AUS)	369,15
4.	Tony Ally (ENG)	354,81
5.	Shannon Roy (AUS)	329,85
6.	Philippe Comtois (CAN)	315,66
7.	Chris Le Poole (CAN)	311,46
8.	Tony Revitt (CAN)	299,31
9.	Mark Shipman (ENG)	298,62
10.	Jonathan Ngu (MAS)	285,45
11.	Wayne Cobb (NZL)	258,78
12.	Syed Abdul Samad Abas (MAS)	224,88
13.	Luzuko Ngqakayi (RSA)	175,62
14.	Imraan Mess (RSA)	169,53
15.	Chang Chong Chaw (MAS)	165,96

=== 3m Springboard ===
- Held on 19 September 1998

RANK	FINAL	SCORE
	Shannon Roy (AUS)	608,37
	Dean Pullar (AUS)	598,14
	Tony Ally (ENG)	587,49
4.	Philippe Comtois (CAN)	586,62
5.	Robert Newbery (AUS)	564,36
6.	Mark Shipman (ENG)	546,69
7.	Chris Le Poole (CAN)	535,68
8.	Yeoh Ken Nee (MAS)	535,17
9.	Evan Stewart (ZIM)	534,48
10.	Alexandre Despatie (CAN)	528,42
11.	Jonathan Ngu (MAS)	517,47
12.	Syed Abdul Samad Abas (MAS)	464,16
13.	Wayne Cobb (NZL)	433,98
14.	Luzuku Ngqakayi (RSA)	331,92
15.	Imraan Mess (RSA)	329,73

=== 10m Platform ===
- Held on 20 September 1998

RANK	FINAL	SCORE
	Alexandre Despatie (CAN)	652,11
	Robert Newbery (AUS)	605,61
	Leon Taylor (ENG)	603,54
4.	Yeoh Ken Nee (MAS)	537,75
5.	Tony Lawson (AUS)	529,86
6.	Bob Morgan (WAL)	517,77
7.	Tony Revitt (CAN)	512,37
8.	Wong Tee Ming (MAS)	379,71

== Women's Results ==
=== 1m Springboard ===
- Held on 18 September 1998

RANK	FINAL	SCORE
	Chantelle Michell (AUS)	271,56
	Blythe Hartley (CAN)	248,28
	Eryn Bulmer (CAN)	239,40
4.	Rebecca Gilmore (AUS)	239,37
5.	Anne-Josee Dionne (CAN)	233,88
6.	Jane Woodward (RSA)	225,84
7.	Jane Smith (ENG)	218,64
8.	Farah Begum Abdullah (MAS)	212,97
9.	Kate Stevely (NZL)	188,70
10.	Tandi Gerrard (RSA)	176,22
11.	Norazlina Sapieye (MAS)	156,93
11.	Angela Clark (ZIM)	144,30

=== 3m Springboard ===
- Held on 20 September 1998

RANK	FINAL	SCORE
	Eryn Bulmer (CAN)	515,88
	Chantelle Michell (AUS)	506,52
	Myriam Boileau (CAN)	480,57
4.	Loudy Tourky (AUS)	476,13
5.	Anne Dionne (CAN)	465,99
6.	Jane Smith (ENG)	445,92
7.	Jane Woodard (RSA)	413,85
8.	Kate Stevely (NZL)	413,85
9.	Rebecca Gilmore (AUS)	409,14
10.	Tandi Gerrard (RSA)	396,78
11.	Wan Nur Safiah (MAS)	390,42
12.	Karen Smith (ENG)	368,55
13.	Farah Begum Abdullah (MAS)	362,25
14.	Angela Clark (ZIM)	343,11

=== 10m Platform ===
- Held on 19 September 1998

RANK	FINAL	SCORE
	Vyninka Arlow (AUS)	456,48
	Myriam Boileau (CAN)	449,19
	Anne Montminy (CAN)	443,46
4.	Blythe Hartley (CAN)	440,19
5.	Lynda Folauhola (AUS)	432,27
6.	Loudy Tourky (AUS)	491,58
7.	Lesley Ward (ENG)	408,39
8.	Wan Nur Safiah (MAS)	362,64
9.	Karen Smith (ENG)	355,50
10.	Leong Mun Yee (MAS)	353,37
11.	Sally Freeman (ENG)	337,23
