= Afonina =

Afonina is a surname. Notable people with the surname include:

- Inga Afonina (born 1969), Russian diver
- Taisia Afonina (1913–1994), Ukrainian and Russian painter
