= Schayes =

Schayes is a surname. Notable people with this name include:

- Danny Schayes (born 1959), American basketball player, son of Dolph Schayes
- Dolph Schayes (1928–2015), American National Basketball Association Hall of Fame player and coach
- Wendy Lucero-Schayes (born 1963), American diver, wife of Danny Schayes
