= Robert Pinter =

Robert Pinter may refer to:

- Robert Pinter (swimmer), Romanian swimmer
- Robert B. Pinter, American biomedical engineer
