= Diving at the 1993 Summer Universiade =

The Diving competition in the 1993 Summer Universiade were held in Buffalo, New York, USA.

== Medal overview ==
Event	Gold	Silver	Bronze
Men's 1-Meter Springboard	Chen Sheng (CHN)	Fernando Platas (MEX)	Wang Yijie (CHN)
Men's 3-Meter Springboard	Xiong Ni (CHN)	Fernando Platas (MEX)	Roman Volod'kov (UKR)
Men's Platform	Xiong Ni (CHN)	Gui Ying (CHN)	Roman Volod'kov (UKR)
Men's Team	China (CHN)	Mexico (MEX)	United States (USA)
Women's 1-Meter Springboard	Yu Xiaoling (CHN)	Annie Pelletier (CAN)	Brita Baldus (GER)
Women's 3-Meter Springboard	Brita Baldus (GER)	Paige Gordon (CAN)	Silke Krüger (GER)
Women's Platform	Anne Montminy (CAN)	Yang Yan (CHN)	Wen Ren (CHN)
Women's Team	China (CHN)	Canada (CAN)	United States (USA)

== Medal table ==
Rank	Nation	Gold	Silver	Bronze	Total
1	China (CHN)	6	2	2	10
2	Canada (CAN)	1	3	0	4
3	Germany (GER)	1	0	2	3
4	Mexico (MEX)	0	3	0	3
5	Ukraine (UKR)	0	0	2	2
5	United States (USA)	0	0	2	2
Totals (6 entries)		8	8	8	24
