= Chen Xiaodan =

Chinese diver (born 1974)

Personal information
- Nationality: Chinese
- Born: 5 March 1974 (age 51)

Sport
- Sport: Diving

Chen Xiaodan (simplified Chinese: 陈晓丹; traditional Chinese: 陳曉丹; pinyin: Chén Xiǎodān; born 5 March 1974) is a Chinese diver. She competed in the women's 10 metre platform event at the 1988 Summer Olympics.
