= Brigitta Cserba =

Hungarian diver

Personal information
- Nationality: Hungarian
- Born: 3 December 1968 (age 56); Budapest, Hungary

Sport
- Sport: Diving

Brigitta Cserba (born 3 December 1968) is a Hungarian diver. She competed in the women's 10 metre platform event at the 1992 Summer Olympics.
