= Ana Ayala =

Mexican diver

Personal information
- Nationality: Mexican
- Born: 16 December 1969 (age 56)

Sport
- Sport: Diving

Ana Ayala (born 16 December 1969) is a Mexican diver. She competed in the women's 3 metre springboard event at the 1992 Summer Olympics.
