= Katalin Haász =

Hungarian diver

Personal information
- Nationality: Hungarian
- Born: 1 December 1966 (age 58); Budapest, Hungary

Sport
- Sport: Diving

Katalin Haász (born 1 December 1966) is a Hungarian diver. She competed in the women's 3 metre springboard event at the 1988 Summer Olympics.
