= Mark Rourke =

Canadian diver

Personal information
- Born: 5 October 1968 (age 57) Montreal, Quebec, Canada

Sport
- Sport: Diving
Medal record
Representing Canada
Commonwealth Games
Silver medal – second place	1990 Auckland	3m springboard

Mark Rourke (born 5 October 1968) is a Canadian diver. He competed at the 1984 Summer Olympics and the 1992 Summer Olympics.
