= Kim Myong-son =

North Korean diver (born 1976)

Personal information
- Full name: 김명선
- Nationality: North Korean
- Born: 9 March 1976 (age 49)

Sport
- Sport: Diving

Kim Myong-son (born 9 March 1976) is a North Korean diver. She competed in the women's 3 metre springboard event at the 1992 Summer Olympics.
