= Eryn Bulmer =

Canadian diver (born 1976)

Eryn Barrett
Personal information
- Full name: Eryn Bulmer Barrett
- Nationality: Canada
- Born: August 1, 1976 (age 49) Edmonton, Alberta, Canada
- Height: 5 ft 8 in (173 cm)
- Weight: 130 lb (59 kg)

Sport
- Sport: Swimming
Medal record
Pan American Games
Gold medal – first place	1999 Winnipeg	Springboard
Commonwealth Games
Gold medal – first place	1998 KL	3m Springboard
Bronze medal – third place	1998 KL	1m Springboard

Eryn Bulmer Barrett (born August 1, 1976) is a female diver from Canada, who won the gold medal in the Women's 3m Springboard at the 1999 Pan American Games. Born in Edmonton, Alberta, Barrett represented her native country at two Summer Olympics: 1996 and 2000.
