= Kaili Vernoff =

American actress (born 1974)

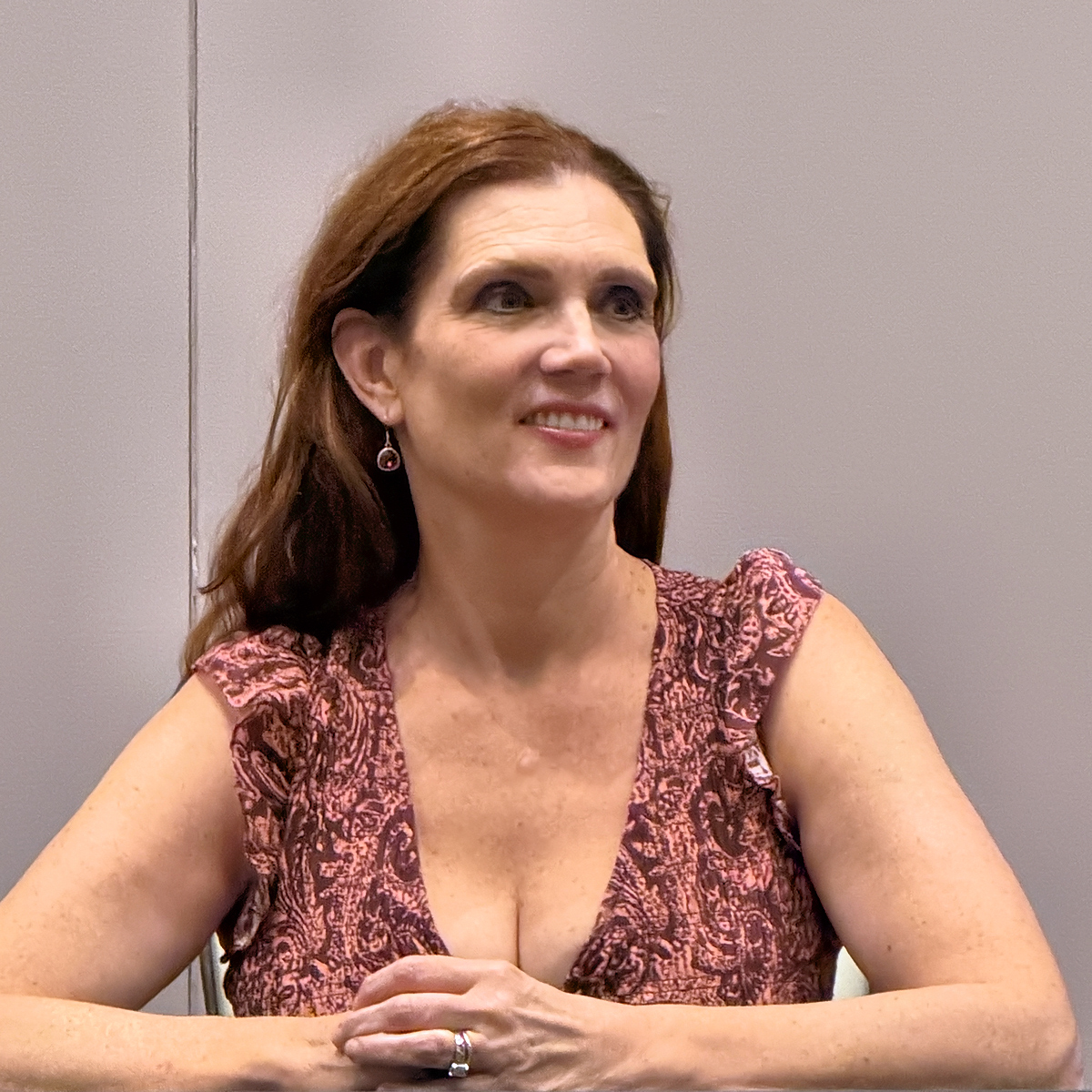
- Vernoff at PCX Austin 2026
- Education: Boston University
- Occupation: Actress
- Years active: 1995–present
- Spouse: Scott Donie
- Children: 1

Kaili Vernoff is an American actress. She has many television and film credits, and is known for her multiple collaborations with Woody Allen and for portraying Susan Grimshaw in the video game Red Dead Redemption 2 (2018).

== Career ==
Kaili Vernoff was raised in several cities in the United States, including Park City, Utah, where she appeared in several theatre performances, including adaptations of Peter Pan and The Wizard of Oz in 1981 and Pinocchio and The Music Man in 1982. She received a Bachelor of Fine Arts in acting from Boston University before relocating to New York to pursue her career.

Woody Allen cast Vernoff in the Academy Award-nominated film Sweet and Lowdown. Vernoff has appeared in six Woody Allen projects in total, most recently in his first television series, Crisis in Six Scenes. She has worked steadily in film, television, and theater. Other notable roles include Kerry Ridge in the drama series The Path (2016–2017) and Karen in the film Thoroughbreds (2017).

Vernoff played a supporting role in the 2018 video game Red Dead Redemption 2 as Susan Grimshaw. Performance capture for the role took place on and off for five years prior to the game's release.

== Personal life ==
Vernoff is married to Scott Donie, with whom she has a daughter, Lucy (born 2005).

== Filmography ==
=== Film ===
Year	Title	Role	Notes
1998	No Looking Back	Alice	
1998	Celebrity		
1999	Sweet and Lowdown	Gracie	
2001	The Curse of the Jade Scorpion	Rosie	
2001	World Traveler	Andrea	
2016	Dark Night	FBI Agent 1 Jessica	uncredited
2017	Thoroughbreds	Karen	
2020	Materna	Jean's Mom	

=== Television ===
Year	Title	Role	Notes
1995	Another World	Laurie Michaels	Several episodes (July 31–December 6)
1996	The High Life	Flannery	7 episodes
2004	The Wrong Coast	Various Celebrity Voices	
2011	Law & Order: Criminal Intent	Attorney Pamela Albert	1 episode
2014	The Mysteries of Laura	Jenny	1 episode
2015	The Affair	Joan	1 episode
2016	Crisis in Six Scenes	Jane	1 episode
2016–2017	The Path	Kerry Ridge	4 episodes
2017–2018	Grey's Anatomy	Naomi	2 episodes
2018	House of Cards	Alicia Heyman	1 episode
2019	The Enemy Within	Helen	Episode: "The Ambassador's Wife"
2019	Tell Me a Story	FBI Agent 2 Sarah	Season 2 main role

=== Video games ===
Year	Title	Role
2013	Grand Theft Auto V	Miranda Cowan
2018	Red Dead Redemption 2	Susan Grimshaw
