= Myriam Boileau =

Canadian diver (born 1977)

Personal information
- Born: November 23, 1977 (age 48) Montreal, Quebec, Canada

Sport
- Sport: Diving
Medal record
Representing Canada
Commonwealth Games
Silver medal – second place	1998 Kuala Lumpur	10m Platform
Bronze medal – third place	1994 Victoria	10m Platform
Bronze medal – third place	1998 Kuala Lumpur	3m Springboard

Myriam Boileau (born November 23, 1977) is a Canadian diver. She began diving at the age of ten, and studied at the Université de Montréal. Boileau is one of the many divers from the world-famous Club de Plongeon CAMO, operating out of the Complexe sportif Claude-Robillard in Montreal.

== Career ==
She won the first international competition for Canada since 1984's Sylvie Bernier at the FINA World Cup of Mexico City, September 1997. She won a bronze medal in the Canada Cup, 2002 in the 10m platform. She finished seventh on the 10m platform diving event at the 2004 Summer Olympics. She has recently retired from competitive diving.
