= Beatrice Bürki =

Swiss diver

Personal information
- Nationality: Swiss
- Born: 7 April 1965 (age 59)

Sport
- Sport: Diving

Beatrice Bürki (born 7 April 1965) is a Swiss diver. She competed in the women's 3 metre springboard event at the 1988 Summer Olympics.
