= Anke Mühlbauer =

German diver (born 1968)

Personal information
- Nationality: German
- Born: 18 April 1968 (age 56); Wolfsburg, Germany

Sport
- Sport: Diving

Anke Mühlbauer (born 18 April 1968) is a German diver. She competed in the women's 3 metre springboard event at the 1988 Summer Olympics.
