= Ellen Owen =

American diver

Personal information
- Born: May 4, 1963 (age 61); Louisville, Kentucky, United States

Sport
- Sport: Diving

Ellen Owen (born May 4, 1963) is an American former diver. She competed in the women's 10 metre platform event at the 1992 Summer Olympics.
