= Ibolya Nagy (diver) =

Hungarian diver

Personal information
- Nationality: Hungarian
- Born: 27 November 1965 (age 59); Szentes, Hungary

Sport
- Sport: Diving

Ibolya Nagy (born 27 November 1965) is a Hungarian former diver. She competed in the women's 10 metre platform event at the 1992 Summer Olympics.
