= Macarena Alexanderson =

Mexican diver

Personal information
- Nationality: Mexican
- Born: 16 February 1972 (age 53)

Sport
- Sport: Diving

Macarena Alexanderson Álvarez (born 16 February 1972) is a Mexican diver. She competed in the women's 10 metre platform event at the 1992 Summer Olympics.
