= Eleni Stavridou =

Greek diver (born 1973)

Personal information
- Nationality: Greek
- Born: 21 October 1973 (age 52)

Sport
- Sport: Diving

Eleni Stavridou (born 21 October 1973) is a Greek diver. She competed in the women's 3 metre springboard event at the 1992 Summer Olympics.
