= Nicky Cooney =

New Zealand diver and police officer (born 1966)

Personal information
- Born: Nicola Val Cooney; 1966 (age 59–60) Rotorua, New Zealand

Sport
- Sport: Diving
Medal record
Women's diving
Representing New Zealand
Commonwealth Games
Bronze medal – third place	1990 Auckland	3 m springboard

Nicola Val Cooney (former married name Riordan; born 1966) is a New Zealand police officer and former diver. She represented her country at the 1986 and 1990 Commonwealth Games, winning a bronze medal at the latter. Since 2023, Cooney has been the Eastern Bay of Plenty area commander in the New Zealand Police.

== Early life and family ==
Cooney was born in Rotorua in 1966, the daughter of Val and Denis Cooney. Her mother was a physical education teacher and her father owned a septic-tank company. She took up diving when she was eleven years old. She began her secondary education at Rotorua Girls' High School, but later became a boarder at Waikato Diocesan School in Hamilton to be able to train daily at the deep-water pool at the University of Waikato.

== Diving ==
In 1982, Cooney was selected for the diving squad as part the New Zealand schools swimming team that competed at the Pacific Schools Games in Brisbane.

At the 1983 New Zealand national diving championships, Cooney finished second in both the women's open one-metre springboard and women's open tower events, and won the Hansells Trophy for the highest-scoring individual dive by an age-group competitor. She was subsequently named in the 15-strong New Zealand team to compete at the world age-group championships held in Hamilton later that year, where she placed eighth in the 15–17 girls' one-metre springboard competition.

In 1984, Cooney reached the qualification standard for the 1984 Olympic Games, but was not selected for the New Zealand team. However, she began competing on the North American diving circuit during the Northern Hemisphere summer. In early 1985, she was part of the four-person New Zealand team that competed in Australia at the Australia Day diving competition and at the Australia Games. In March that year, Cooney won the women's three-metre and tower titles at the New Zealand diving championships, and was runner-up in the women's one-metre springboard event.

In early 1986, Cooney was a member of the New Zealand team at the Southern Cross international diving series in Australia. At the New Zealand championships in March that year, she was injured while competing in the women's platform event and had to withdraw from the event. However, she recovered to win the three-metre springboard title. Later that year, Cooney competed in the three-metre springboard at the 1986 Commonwealth Games, finishing fifth with a score of 469.62, a New Zealand record score for the event, surpassing the record previously held by Ann Fargher.

In 1987, Cooney retained her national three-metre springboard title, and the following year she was again overlooked for selection to represent New Zealand at the 1988 Summer Olympics. In 1989, she competed at the FINA Diving World Cup in Indianapolis.

At the 1990 Commonwealth Games held in Auckland, Cooney competed in the women's one-metre springboard, in which she finished in eighth place, and the three-metre springboard event where she won the bronze medal. Also in 1990, Cooney was awarded the New Zealand 1990 Commemoration Medal.

== Police career ==
In 1990, Cooney joined the New Zealand Police, and undertook a range of duties, including frontline and road policing. After taking a six-year break from the police, she returned and became head of the road policing team in Rotorua, before serving in various managerial roles at district headquarters. In 2023, Cooney was appointed Eastern Bay of Plenty area commander.
