= Lori Roberts =

Bahamian diver

Personal information
- Nationality: Bahamian
- Born: 31 August 1968 (age 56)

Sport
- Sport: Diving

Lori Roberts (born 31 August 1968) is a Bahamian diver. She competed in the women's 3 metre springboard event at the 1988 Summer Olympics.
