= Ionica Tudor =

Romanian diver

Personal information
- Nationality: Romanian
- Born: 9 January 1975 (age 50)

Sport
- Sport: Diving

Ionica Tudor (born 9 January 1975) is a Romanian diver. She competed in the women's 3 metre springboard event at the 1992 Summer Olympics.
