= William Hayes (diver) =

Canadian diver

Personal information
- Born: 14 January 1968 (age 57); Toronto, Ontario, Canada

Sport
- Sport: Diving

William Hayes (born 14 January 1968) is a Canadian diver. He competed in the men's 10 metre platform event at the 1992 Summer Olympics.
