= Claude Villeneuve =

Canadian academic and biologist (1954–2024)

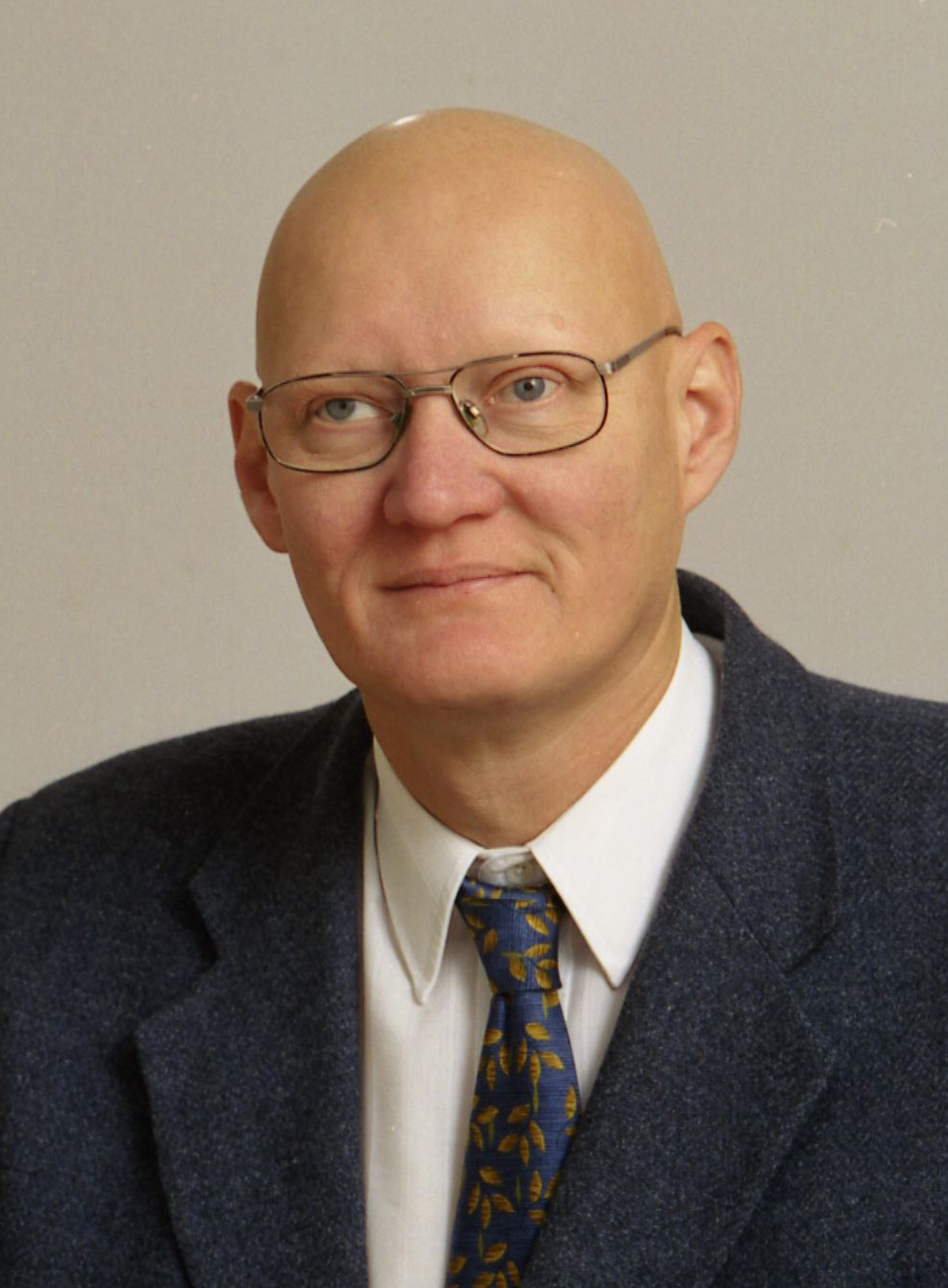
- Villeneuve in 2008
- Born: November 1954; Chicoutimi, Quebec, Canada
- Died: 19 May 2024 (aged 69)
- Occupation(s): Professor; Biologist

Claude Villeneuve (November 1954 – 19 May 2024) was a Canadian academic and biologist.

== Biography ==
Born in Chicoutimi in November 1954, Claude Villeneuve served as director of the Institut Européen pour le Conseil en Environnement in Strasbourg from 1993 to 1994. He was also editor-in-chief of the journal ÉCODÉCISION from 1994 to 1997. He taught at various Quebec institutions throughout his career, beginning a professorship at the Cégep de Saint-Félicien. In 2001, he became a professor of biology at the Université du Québec à Chicoutimi and became the university's Chaire en Éco-Conseil in 2003. In 2018, he joined the research team Carbone Boréal.

Villeneuve died on 19 May 2024, at the age of 69.

== Works ==
- Des animaux malades de l'homme ? (1983)
- Vers un réchauffement global ? (1990)
- Le Fleuve aux grandes eaux (1995)
- Eau secours! (1996)
- Qui a peur de l'an 2000 ? (1998)
- Vivre les changements climatiques, l’effet de serre expliqué (2001)
- Vivre les changements climatiques, quoi de neuf? (2005)
- Vivre les changements climatiques : Réagir pour l’avenir (2007)
- Est-il trop tard? Le point sur les changements climatiques (2013)

== Distinctions ==
- Scientifique de l'année (2001)
- Member of the Cercle des Phénix (2002)
- Prix littéraires du Salon du livre du Saguenay-Lac-Saint-Jean for Vivre les changements climatiques (2002)
- Prix Georges-Préfontaine (2003)
- Silver Award at the Canadian Environment Awards (2006)
- Prix Acfas Pierre-Dansereau (2022)
