= Doris Pecher =

German diver

Personal information
- Nationality: German
- Born: 20 September 1966 (age 58); Cologne, Germany

Sport
- Sport: Diving

Doris Pecher (born 20 September 1966) is a German diver. She competed in the women's 10 metre platform event at the 1988 Summer Olympics.
