= Rachel Wilkes =

Australian diver

Personal information
- Full name: Rachel Elizabeth Wilkes
- Nationality: Australian
- Born: 14 February 1976 (age 50)

Sport
- Sport: Diving

Rachel Elizabeth Wilkes (born 14 February 1976) is a former Australian diver. She competed in the women's 3 metre springboard event at the 1992 Summer Olympics. Additionally, Wilkes took part in two events at the 1994 Commonwealth Games.
