= Jane Woodward =

English author and philanthropist

Jane Woodward (1823/4 – 27 October 1894) was an English author and philanthropist.

Woodward was born in Framfield, Sussex, England, the daughter of John Woodward and Catherine née Mabbott. John Woodward had inherited Streele Place from his uncle Robert Durrant in 1799 and Jane lived from independent means during her adult life. Jane had six surviving siblings, three sisters and three brothers, including Lionel Mabbott Woodward who was later to become the Chief Judicial Commissioner for the Federated Malay States.

Woodward's writings include Our Summer Holiday, which chronicled her travels to the Lake District, the Scottish Highlands and Edinburgh. These holidays were undertaken with her close friend and fellow author, Mary Eyre, who was another adventurous traveller.

She was socially aware and helped out weekly at the Work Society and at a Mothers' Meetings in London's West End with other ladies of a similar mind. She also ran Sunday School classes for boys and a Bible class for young women. In the concluding chapter of Our Summer Holiday, Woodward wrote at length about the lives of the working-class mothers she met during these activities.

Jane Woodward was unmarried and died in Hastings, Sussex, on 27 October 1894.
