= Karla Goltman =

Argentine diver

Personal information
- Nationality: Argentine
- Born: 9 January 1967 (age 58)

Sport
- Sport: Diving

Karla Goltman (born 9 January 1967) is an Argentine diver. She competed in the women's 3 metre springboard event at the 1992 Summer Olympics.
