= Janaka Biyanwila =

Sri Lankan diver

Personal information
- Nationality: Sri Lankan
- Born: 4 May 1965 (age 59); Colombo, Sri Lanka

Sport
- Sport: Diving

Janaka Biyanwila (born 4 May 1965) is a Sri Lankan diver. He competed in the men's 3 metre springboard event at the 1996 Summer Olympics.
