= Larry Flewwelling =

Canadian diver

Personal information
- Born: 9 August 1965 (age 60) Kentville, Nova Scotia, Canada

Sport
- Sport: Diving
Medal record
Representing Canada
Commonwealth Games
Bronze medal – third place	1990 Auckland	3m springboard

Larry Flewwelling (born 9 August 1965) is a Canadian former diver. He competed in the men's 3 metre springboard event at the 1988 Summer Olympics.
