= Scott Donie =

American diver (born 1968)

Personal information
- Full name: Scott Richard Donie
- Born: October 10, 1968 (age 57) Vicenza, Italy
- Height: 175 cm (5 ft 9 in)
- Weight: 77 kg (170 lb)
- Spouse: Kaili Vernoff (m. 2004)

Sport
- College team: Southern Methodist University
- Club: Morningside Divers, NY; Woodlands Diving Team; Miami Diving
- Coached by: T. Faulkenberry (Woodlands); Jim Stillson (SMU)
Medal record
Men's diving
Representing United States
Olympic Games
| Silver medal – second place | 1992 Barcelona | 10 m platform |
Universiade
| Bronze medal – third place | 1991 Sheffield | Platform |

Scott Richard Donie (born October 10, 1968, in Vicenza, Italy) was a former American diver for Southern Methodist University, a silver medalist in 10m platform diving in the 1992 Barcelona Olympics, and participated in springboard diving in the 1996 Atlanta Olympics, placing fourth. He later became an accomplished head diving coach for New York University and then Columbia University.

He was born in Vicenza, Italy, on October 10, 1968, while his father served with the U.S. Army, and dove on a local summer swim team once his family moved to New Jersey. While commuting from the New Jersey area, Donie was fortunate to be mentored by Coach Jim Stillson at New York's Columbia University on his age group team, the Morningside Divers. When Donie was 12, his family made the move to Texas and Scott began diving with Terry Faulkenberry's Woodlands Diving Team. This greatly improved his diving and expanded his ambitions as a diver.

Moving again, by his Senior Year in High School, Donie lived in Boca Raton, Florida and attended Spanish River Community High School where in April, 1986 he was the high point scorer in platform diving, his signature event, in the preliminaries of the U.S. Diving National Indoor Championships. While in the Boca Raton Area, Donie dove and trained with the Mission Bay Makos Swimming and Diving Team where he was managed by Hall of Fame Coach Ron O'Brien. Donie was selected for the National American High School Team all four years and was a national champion twice. In later years, Donie trained in the Fort Lauderdale area, and with Florida's Miami Diving.

== Diving for SMU ==
Donie swam for Southern Methodist University (SMU) from 1987-1990, and was the recipient of All American honors from 1987-1989. He is a six-time age Group National Diving Champion and a two-time National Senior Champion. He received a bachelor's degree from SMU in 1990, where as a swimmer he was an eleven-time Southwest Conference Diving Champion and a National NCAA Division I Champion three times. At SMU, he again swam for accomplished coach Jim Stillson, a former Ohio State University All-American diver and diving coach at Columbia.

Donie was a member of the US National Diving team during his time at SMU, and beyond, from 1985 through 1996. He was a national U.S. diving champion eleven times.

== Olympic competition ==
Donie earned the silver medal in the 1992 Summer Olympics on the 10 m platform, and placed 4th in the 3 m springboard at the 1996 Summer Olympics in Atlanta.

== Coaching diving ==
While still affiliated with U.S. Diving, Donie began his dive coaching career as Assistant Coach from 1993-1996 at the University of Miami, where he likely dove with Miami Diving, though he may have been affiliated earlier as well. He later moved to New York, where he married his wife Kaili Vernoff, with whom he had a daughter. He was the Head Diving Coach at New York University from 2000 to 2016, where he coached 18 All-Americans. Donie is currently the Head Diving Coach of Columbia University in Manhattan, as was his former coach Jim Stillson.

== Honors ==
He is a member of the Texas Swimming and Diving Hall of Fame, and was made a member of the SMU Athletic Hall of Fame in 2016. Becoming well known nationally for his Olympic participation, he was featured in a center photo in coverage of both the 1992 and 1996 Olympics in the widely read American periodical Sports Illustrated. Donie won the Phillips Performance award for his diving as well as many High Point awards. He was on two occasions the NCAA Diver of the Year, and was an NCAA collegiate academic all-American. As a coach, he has been named a University Athletic Association (UAA) coach of the year on a number of years. Holding a degree of national celebrity, his period of depression after the 1996 Olympics was the subject of an episode of the program Dateline, which aired on NBC on July 17, 1996.
