= Jason Napper =

Canadian diver

Sport
- Sport: Diving
Medal record
Representing Canada
Commonwealth Games
Gold medal – first place	1994 Victoria	1 m springboard
Bronze medal – third place	1994 Victoria	10 m platform

Jason Napper is a former Canadian diver. He won a gold medal in the 1 metre springboard event and a bronze medal in the 10 metre platform event at the 1994 Commonwealth Games in Victoria, British Columbia.
