= Brita Baldus =

German diver

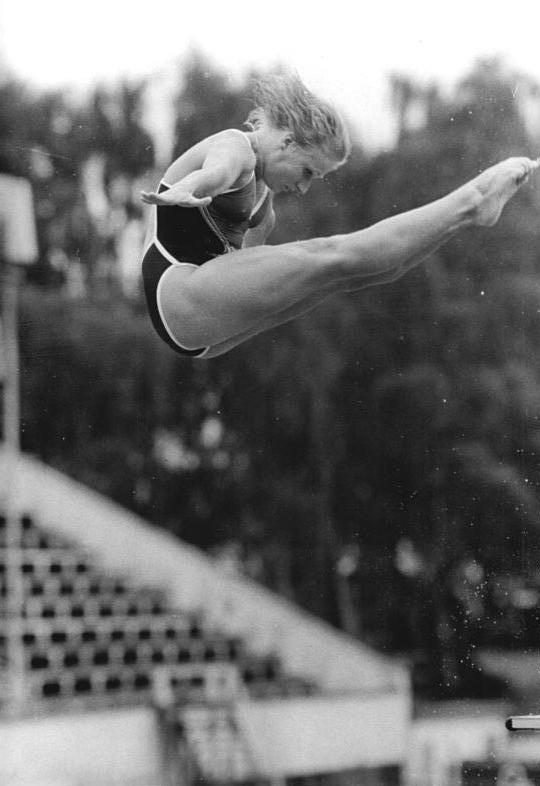

Personal information
- Nationality: German
- Born: 4 June 1965 (age 61) Leipzig, Saxony, East Germany

Sport
- Country: Germany
- Sport: Diving
- Event(s): 1m, 3m, 10 m
Medal record
Women's diving
Representing East Germany
European Championships
Gold medal – first place	1983 Rome	3 m springboard
Silver medal – second place	1989 Bonn	1 m springboard
Silver medal – second place	1989 Bonn	3 m springboard
Bronze medal – third place	1985 Sofia	3 m springboard
Bronze medal – third place	1987 Strasbourg	3 m springboard
Representing Germany
Olympic Games
Bronze medal – third place	1992 Barcelona	3 m springboard
World Championships
Bronze medal – third place	1991 Perth	3 m springboard
European Championships
Gold medal – first place	1991 Athens	1 m springboard
Gold medal – first place	1993 Sheffield	3 m springboard
Bronze medal – third place	1991 Athens	3 m springboard
Universiade
Gold medal – first place	1993 Buffalo	3 m springboard
Silver medal – second place	1991 Sheffield	1 m springboard
Silver medal – second place	1991 Sheffield	3 m springboard
Bronze medal – third place	1987 Zagreb	3 m springboard
Bronze medal – third place	1993 Buffalo	1 m springboard

Brita Pia Baldus (born 4 June 1965 in Leipzig, Saxony) is a German diver, who competed for East Germany until the unification in 1991. She was affiliated with the Sportclub Deutsche Hochschule für Körperkultur in Leipzig.

She participated in the 1988 Summer Olympics for East Germany, placing seventh in the 3 metre springboard event. She then won a bronze medal in the same event at the 1992 Summer Olympics.
