= María Elena Romero =

Mexican diver

Personal information
- Nationality: Mexican
- Born: 31 October 1972 (age 52)

Sport
- Sport: Diving

María Elena Romero (born 31 October 1972) is a Mexican diver. She competed at the 1992 Summer Olympics and the 1996 Summer Olympics.
