= Evelyne Boisvert =

Canadian diver

Personal information
- Born: 24 September 1970 (age 55) Cap-de-la-Madeleine, Quebec, Canada

Sport
- Sport: Diving

Evelyne Boisvert (born 24 September 1970) is a Canadian diver. She competed in the women's 3 metre springboard event at the 1992 Summer Olympics.
