= Claudia Stănescu =

Romanian swimmer

Personal information
- Born: 13 January 1976 (age 50)

Sport
- Sport: Swimming

Claudia Stănescu (born 13 January 1976) is a Romanian backstroke swimmer. She competed in three events at the 1992 Summer Olympics. Now teaching Physiology at University of Arizona.
