= Dario di Fazio =

Venezuelan diver

Dario Di Fazio
Personal information
- Nationality: Venezuelan
- Born: 19 December 1966 (age 59)

Sport
- Sport: Diving

Dario di Fazio (born 19 December 1966) is a Venezuelan diver. He competed at the 1992 Summer Olympics and the 1996 Summer Olympics.
