= Silvana Neitzke =

Brazilian diver

Personal information
- Born: 2 March 1971 (age 54); Araguari, Brazil

Sport
- Sport: Diving

Silvana Neitzke (born 2 March 1971) is a Brazilian diver. She competed in the women's 10 metre platform event at the 1992 Summer Olympics.
