= Bruno Fournier =

Canadian diver (born 1967)

Personal information
- Full name: Bruno Michel Fournier
- Born: 10 January 1967 (age 59) Quebec City, Quebec, Canada

Sport
- Sport: Diving
Medal record
Men's diving
Representing Canada
Commonwealth Games
Bronze medal – third place	1990 Henderson	10 m platform

Bruno Michel Fournier (born 10 January 1967) is a Canadian former diver. He competed in the men's 10 metre platform event at the 1992 Summer Olympics.
