= Wendy Lucero-Schayes =

American diver

Personal information
- Full name: Wendy Lucero-Schayes
- Born: June 26, 1963 (age 63) Denver, Colorado, USA
- Height: 5 ft 4 in (163 cm)
- Weight: 122 lb (55 kg)

Sport
- Sport: Diving
Medal record
Women's diving
Representing the United States
World Championships
Silver medal – second place	1991 Perth	1 m springboard

Wendy Lucero-Schayes (born June 26, 1963) is a former springboard diver, Olympian, sports broadcaster, and business professional. A native of Denver, Colorado, she competed for the United States at the 1988 Summer Olympics in Seoul, Korea, placing sixth in the women’s 3-meter springboard. Known for her consistency and artistic grace from the board, she went on to win a silver medal at the 1991 World Aquatics Championships in 1-meter springboard, one of the signature achievements of her international career. Domestically, Lucero-Schayes dominated U.S. springboard diving in the late 1980s and early 1990s, amassing nine national springboard titles and three U.S. Olympic Festival titles. She was named U.S. Diver of the Year in both 1990 and 1991. Following her athletic career, Lucero-Schayes transitioned into broadcasting and later into business consulting and real estate development.

== Early life and education ==
Lucero-Schayes grew up in Denver, Colorado. She initially pursued multiple sports, including gymnastics (winning a state championship at 9 years old), ballet, and figure skating, before ultimately concentrating on diving—an arena where her aerial awareness and training translated most effectively. At Thomas Jefferson High School, Lucero-Schayes was a classmate of 1984 Summer Olympics Gold and Silver Medalist swimmer George DiCarlo. After beginning her collegiate career at University of Nebraska-Lincoln, Lucero-Schayes transferred to Southern Illinois University where she ascended onto the national diving scene by winning the 1985 NCAA 1‑meter springboard title. She was also named an Academic All-American all four years of college.

== Collegiate and National Rise ==
Following her NCAA championship, Lucero-Schayes’ trajectory accelerated on the national stage. Competing as a springboard specialist, she won nine U.S. springboard crowns and three U.S. Olympic Festival titles over the course of her career—results that positioned her among America’s most reliable springboard performers in an era otherwise marked by the global rise of Chinese women’s diving. Her domestic success across 1‑meter and 3‑meter events—indoors and outdoors—underpinned her selection to major international competitions. The breadth of her wins, particularly from 1989-1991, made her a dominant stateside presence.

=== 1988 Seoul Olympics ===
Lucero-Schayes earned a place on the U.S. Olympic Team in August 1988 and advanced to the Olympic final in Seoul. In a field led by China’s Gao Min and Li Qing, she finished sixth in the women’s 3-meter springboard—a strong showing amid a period of intensifying international competition.

=== 1991 World Aquatics Championships ===
Lucero-Schayes’ most prominent global medal arrived at the 1991 World Aquatics Championships in Perth, Australia, where she won silver in the women’s 1-meter springboard. Her performance in Perth marked the pinnacle of her international podium finishes and reflected the consistency that defined her prime.

=== Technique and Competitive Context ===
Lucero-Schayes’ strengths were rooted in springboard timing, board “feel,” and a steady list that scored well with judges across preliminaries and finals. Her career unfolded during a pivotal transition in women’s diving, as Chinese divers—led by Gao Min—redefined the standard in springboard throughout the late 1980s. By the 1988 Summer Olympics, the balance of power had shifted strongly toward China, amplifying the significance of reliable finalists like Lucero-Schayes in U.S. lineups of the era.

== Broadcasting and Professional Career ==
After retiring from competition, Lucero-Schayes transitioned to broadcasting, working in on‑air and production roles for major U.S. networks—including ABC, NBC and ESPN—with assignments spanning event coverage and features. She worked as a feature reporter for KSAZ-TV (Fox) in Phoenix, Arizona, where she produced and reported sports and human-interest stories. Earlier, she served as an associate producer at KUSA-TV (NBC) in Denver, Colorado, contributing to both news and feature segments and hosting a talk show titled “Focus Colorado.” Lucero-Schayes also built a career beyond television, working in business and media‑adjacent roles that leveraged her communication skills and high‑performance background.

== Personal life ==
In 1991, Lucero-Schayes married Danny Schayes, a center who played 18 seasons in the National Basketball Association (NBA). While engaged, they appeared in a 1991 episode of the NBA Inside Stuff TV show. They have one son, Logan, a college basketball player.

== Honors and Halls of Fame ==
In addition to national awards from her competitive years, Lucero-Schayes has been recognized in regional and sport-specific honor rolls. Induction into the Sportswomen of Colorado Hall of Fame in 1987, Thomas Jefferson High School Hall of Fame in 2011 and Colorado Swimming Hall of Fame in 2013 are regional tributes to her Denver roots. In 1992, Lucero-Schayes was named one of the top Hispanic Women in America, and she was inducted in the Southern Illinois University Saluki Hall of Fame in 1995.

== Legacy ==
Wendy Lucero-Schayes’ career took place during a period of depth in U.S. women’s springboard diving and a time of change for the sport. While the podium became increasingly difficult amid China’s global dominance, she remained a consistent finals presence and one of the most decorated U.S. springboard divers domestically, combining NCAA success, national titles, U.S. Olympic Festival victories, and a World Championships silver medal.

== Diving Results ==
- U.S. Olympic Team Member (1988) — Springboard Finalist (6th Place)
- World Aquatics Championships Silver Medalist (1991) — Springboard
- NCAA Champion (1985) — Southern Illinois University
- Nine-time U.S. National Champion — Springboard
