= Diving at the Commonwealth Games =

Diving is one of the sports at the quadrennial Commonwealth Games competition. It has been a Commonwealth Games sport since the inaugural edition of the event's precursor, the 1930 British Empire Games. It is an optional sport and may or may not be included in the sporting programme of each edition of the games.

== Editions ==
Games	Year	Host city	Host country	Best nation
I	1930	Hamilton	Canada	Canada
II	1934	London	England	England
III	1938	Sydney	Australia	Australia
IV	1950	Auckland	New Zealand	England
V	1954	Vancouver	Canada	Australia
VI	1958	Cardiff	Wales	England
VII	1962	Perth	Australia	England
VIII	1966	Kingston	Jamaica	England
IX	1970	Edinburgh	Scotland	Canada
X	1974	Christchurch	New Zealand	Canada
XI	1978	Edmonton	Canada	Canada
XII	1982	Brisbane	Australia	Australia
XIII	1986	Edinburgh	Scotland	Australia
XIV	1990	Auckland	New Zealand	Australia
XV	1994	Victoria	Canada	Canada
XVI	1998	Kuala Lumpur	Malaysia	Australia
XVII	2002	Manchester	England	Australia
XVIII	2006	Melbourne	Australia	Australia
XIX	2010	Delhi	India	Canada
XX	2014	Glasgow	Scotland	England
XXI	2018	Gold Coast, Queensland	Australia	England
XXII	2022	Birmingham	England	England

== All-time medal table ==
Updated after the 2022 Commonwealth Games

Rank	Nation	Gold	Silver	Bronze	Total
1	Australia	41	45	42	128
2	Canada	39	45	42	126
3	England	37	26	27	90
4	Scotland	5	1	2	8
5	Malaysia	3	8	6	17
6	Zimbabwe	1	2	1	4
7	Wales	1	1	1	3
8	South Africa	1	0	0	1
Totals (8 entries)		128	128	121	377
