= Karen Smith (diver) =

British diver

Personal information
- Nationality: British
- Born: 16 May 1976 (age 48)

Sport
- Sport: Diving

Karen Smith (born 16 May 1976) is a British diver. She competed in the women's 3 metre springboard event at the 2000 Summer Olympics.
