= Marian Satnoianu =

Romanian swimmer

Personal information
- Born: 3 April 1971 (age 55)

Sport
- Sport: Swimming

Marian Satnoianu (born 3 April 1971) is a Romanian medley swimmer. He competed in two events at the 1992 Summer Olympics.
