= Jeff Hirst =

Canadian diver (born 1963)

Personal information
- Full name: Jeffrey Hirst
- Born: 22 December 1963 (age 61); Montreal, Quebec, Canada

Sport
- Sport: Diving
- Club: University of Toronto

Achievements and titles
- Olympic finals: 1988
- Regional finals: 1987
- National finals: 1988
- Commonwealth finals: 1982, 1986

Jeffrey Hirst (born 22 December 1963) is a Canadian diver. He competed in the men's 10 metre platform event at the 1988 Summer Olympics. He also competed at the 1982 and 1986 Commonwealth Games, as well as the 1983, 1985 and 1987 Summer Universiades. In 2002, Hirst was inducted into the University of Toronto Sports Hall of Fame.

== Career ==
Hirst has dived for the University of Toronto. In 1981, he won the under-17s one metre platform event at the Canadian Championships. He also came second in the three metre platform and tower events. He came second in the 3 metre platform event at the 1982 Canadian Championships. As a result, he qualified for the 1982 Commonwealth Games. In the same year, he came third in the 10 metre tower competition at an invitational event in Brno, Czechoslovakia. He was the only Canadian medallist at the meeting. He finished eighth in the 10 metre platform event at the 1983 Summer Universiade. He came second in the 10 metre tower event at the 1985 Canadian Championships, having led the event for a time. As a result, he qualified for the event at the 1985 Summer Universiade.

In 1986, he won the 3 metre event at the Canadian Inter-University Athletic Union Swimming Championship, and came fifth in the 10 metre platform event at the 1986 Commonwealth Games. In 1987, he competed in the 10 metres event at the Pan American Games, and the 3 metres and 10 metres events at the Summer Universiade. That year, he also came second in the tower events at the Canadian Championships.

In 1988, Hirst won the 10 metre platform event at the Canadian Championships. He competed at the Championships despite having fractured his thumb five weeks beforehand, and as a result of his victory, he was selected for the men's 10 metre platform event at the 1988 Summer Olympics. He finished 20th overall at the Games.

== Post-career ==
After retiring, Hirst worked as a personal trainer, and set up a company Training Zone Fitness Consultants Inc. In 2002, Hirst was inducted into the University of Toronto Sports Hall of Fame.

== Personal life ==
Hirst's wife Anna Dacyshyn was also a diver, who was inducted into the University of Toronto Sports Hall of Fame in 2010.
