= Diana Ureche =

Romanian swimmer

Personal information
- Born: 19 October 1974 (age 51)

Sport
- Sport: Swimming
- College team: Simon Fraser Red Leafs
- Coach: Liam Donnelly (SFU)

Diana Ureche (born 19 October 1974) is a Romanian butterfly and freestyle swimmer. She competed in five events at the 1992 Summer Olympics.
