= Russell Butler =

Australian diver

Personal information
- Nationality: Australian
- Born: 6 March 1968 (age 58) Melbourne, Australia

Sport
- Sport: Diving
Medal record
Representing Australia
Commonwealth Games
Gold medal – first place	1990 Auckland	1m Springboard

Russell Charles Butler (born 6 March 1968) is an Australian former diver, born in Melbourne, who competed in the 1988 Summer Olympics and in the 1996 Summer Olympics.
