= Ioana Voicu =

Romanian diver

Personal information
- Nationality: Romanian
- Born: 27 February 1972 (age 53)

Sport
- Sport: Diving

Ioana Voicu (born 27 February 1972) is a Romanian diver. She competed in the women's 10 metre platform event at the 1992 Summer Olympics.
