= Barbara Bush (diver) =

Canadian diver (born 1964)

Personal information
- Born: 6 April 1964 (age 62) Montreal, Quebec, Canada

Sport
- Sport: Diving
Medal record
Representing Canada
Commonwealth Games
Silver medal – second place	1990 Auckland	3m springboard

Barbara Bush (born 6 April 1964) is a Canadian diver and the executive director of the Alberta Diving Association. Bush was a finalist in the women's 3 metre springboard event at the 1988 Summer Olympics. She was also a silver medalist at the 1990 Commonwealth Games in Auckland, New Zealand.

Bush is the current executive director of the Alberta Diving Association and a currently ranked FINA International Diving Judge.
