= Catherine Maliev-Aviolat =

Swiss diver

Personal information
- Nationality: Swiss
- Born: 20 March 1970 (age 55)

Sport
- Sport: Diving

Catherine Maliev-Aviolat (born 20 March 1970) is a Swiss diver. She competed at the 1992 Summer Olympics and the 2000 Summer Olympics.
