= Gao Min (diver) =

Chinese diver

Personal information
- Born: September 28, 1970 (age 55) Zigong, Sichuan, China

Sport
- Sport: Diving
Medal record
Representing China
Olympic Games
Gold medal – first place	1988 Seoul	3m Springboard
Gold medal – first place	1992 Barcelona	3m Springboard
World Championships
Gold medal – first place	1986 Madrid	3m Springboard
Gold medal – first place	1991 Perth	1m Springboard
Gold medal – first place	1991 Perth	3m Springboard
Universiade
Gold medal – first place	1991 Sheffield	3 m springboard
Asian Games
Gold medal – first place	1990 Beijing	1m Springboard
Gold medal – first place	1990 Beijing	3m Springboard
Gold medal – first place	1990 Beijing	Team Event
FINA Diving World Cup
Gold medal – first place	1987 Amersfoort	3m Springboard
Gold medal – first place	1989 Indianapolis	1m Springboard
Gold medal – first place	1989 Indianapolis	3m Springboard
Goodwill Games
Gold medal – first place	1990 Seattle	1m Springboard
Gold medal – first place	1990 Seattle	3m Springboard

Gao Min (Chinese: 高敏; pinyin: Gāo Mǐn; born September 28, 1970) is a Chinese diver who won gold medals in the springboard event of the 1988 and 1992 Olympic Games.

== Early life ==
Gao was born in Zigong, Sichuan, and learned how to swim at the age of four. At nine, she started gymnastics training, before she was spotted by a diving coach and persuaded to switch to compete in diving.

== Diving career ==
She won her first major international competition - on the 3-meter springboard - in the World Championships in 1986. Nicknamed the "Diving Queen", Gao is one of the most dominant divers in the history of the sport. Undefeated in world competition on the 3-meter springboard between 1986 and 1992 (including Olympic Games gold medals both in 1988 in Seoul and 1992 in Barcelona). She is tied with the legendary Greg Louganis in winning the greatest number of international awards on one board. She is also the only female diver to surpass the 600-points mark in the event; and she did it three times.

Gao was chosen as the World's Best Diver of the Year by the U.S. magazine Swimming World from 1987 to 1989 and the Woman's World Springboard Diver of the Year for a record seven consecutive years from 1986 to 1992.

In 1998, Gao was inducted into the International Swimming Hall of Fame.

== Post-diving career ==
Gao coached in Edmonton, Alberta for many years for the Edmonton Kinsmen Diving club, producing many national team divers and helping to further the sport of diving in Canada.

In 2003, Gao was inducted into the Women's Sports Hall Of Fame.

In 2005, Gao left Canada to return to China to promote her autobiography. The book is currently only available in Chinese, but it will be available in English in early 2007.

=== Humanitarian Activism ===
Gao is the first ambassador of Compact2025, a partnership that develops and disseminates evidence-based advice to politicians and other decision-makers aimed at ending hunger and undernutrition in the coming 10 years.

== See also ==
- List of members of the International Swimming Hall of Fame
- List of divers
