= Clara Elena Ciocan =

Romanian diver

Personal information
- Nationality: Romanian
- Born: 28 December 1978 (age 46); Bacău, Romania

Sport
- Sport: Diving

Clara Elena Ciocan (born 28 December 1978) is a Romanian diver. She competed at the 1992 Summer Olympics, the 1996 Summer Olympics and the 2000 Summer Olympics.
