= Diving at the 1992 Summer Olympics =

Diving at the Games of the XXV Olympiad
- Venue: Piscina Municipal de Montjuïc
- Dates: 26 July 1992 through 4 August 1992
- No. of events: 4
- Competitors: 100 from 31 nations

At the 1992 Summer Olympics in Barcelona, four diving events were contested during a competition that took place at the Piscina Municipal de Montjuïc, from 26 July to 4 August ( 30–31 July, rest days), comprising 100 divers from 31 nations.

== Medal summary ==
The events are named according to the International Olympic Committee labelling, but they appeared on the official report as "springboard diving" and "platform diving", respectively.

=== Men ===
Event	Gold	Silver	Bronze
3 m springboard	Mark Lenzi; United States	Tan Liangde; China	Dmitri Sautin; Unified Team (Russia)
10 m platform	Sun Shuwei; China	Scott Donie; United States	Xiong Ni; China

=== Women ===
Event	Gold	Silver	Bronze
3 m springboard	Gao Min; China	Irina Lashko; Unified Team (Russia)	Brita Baldus; Germany
10 m platform	Fu Mingxia; China	Yelena Miroshina; Unified Team (Russia)	Mary Ellen Clark; United States

== Medal table ==
Rank	Nation	Gold	Silver	Bronze	Total
1	China	3	1	1	5
2	United States	1	1	1	3
3	Unified Team	0	2	1	3
4	Germany	0	0	1	1
Totals (4 entries)		4	4	4	12

== Participating nations ==
Here are listed the nations that were represented in the diving events and, in brackets, the number of national competitors.

- Argentina (2)
- Australia (7)
- Austria (2)
- Belgium (1)
- Brazil (1)
- Bulgaria (1)
- Canada (8)
- China (8)
- France (2)
- Germany (6)
- Great Britain (4)
- Greece (1)
- Hungary (3)
- Italy (3)
- Japan (3)
- Mexico (8)
- Netherlands (2)
- New Zealand (1)
- North Korea (4)
- Norway (1)
- Poland (1)
- Romania (4)
- South Africa (1)
- Spain (3)
- Sweden (1)
- Switzerland (2)
- Unified Team (7)
- United States (7)
- Venezuela (1)
- Zimbabwe (2)

== See also ==
- Diving at the 1991 Pan American Games
- Diving at the 1994 Commonwealth Games
