= Heidemarie Bártová =

Czech diver

Personal information
- Born: March 13, 1965 (age 61)
Medal record
Women's diving
Representing Czechoslovakia
World Championships
Bronze medal – third place	1991 Perth	1 m springboard

Heidemarie Grécká-Bártová (born March 13, 1965, in Ústí nad Labem) is a retired female diver from the Czech Republic, who twice competed for Czechoslovakia at the Summer Olympics: 1980 and 1992. She won the bronze medal at the 1991 World Aquatics Championships in the inaugural women's 1 m springboard event.
