= Robert Pinter (swimmer) =

Romanian swimmer

Personal information
- Born: 6 January 1968 (age 58) Baia Mare, Romania

Sport
- Sport: Swimming

Robert Pinter (born 6 January 1968) is a Romanian butterfly and freestyle swimmer. He competed in two events at the 1992 Summer Olympics.
