= Kamilla Gamme =

Norwegian diver

Personal information
- Nationality: Norwegian
- Born: 1 March 1969 (age 56) Hamar, Norway

Sport
- Sport: Diving
- Club: Hamar IL

Kamilla Gamme (born 1 March 1969) is a Norwegian diver.

== Biography ==
Born in Hamar on 1 Match 1969, Gamme competed at the 1988 Summer Olympics in Seoul, where she placed seventh in women's 10 metre platform. She represented the club Hamar IL.

She won a total of seven Nordic championships in diving, and 25 national titles. She won the King’s Cup trophy in 1988.
