= Julie Farrell-Ovenhouse =

American diver

Personal information
- Born: August 23, 1968 (age 57) Lansing, Michigan, United States

Sport
- Sport: Diving

Julie Farrell-Ovenhouse (born August 23, 1968) is an American diver. She competed in the women's 3 metre springboard event at the 1992 Summer Olympics. She has been described as "the greatest diver, male or female, to ever come through Michigan State".

== Biography ==
Farrell-Ovenhouse was born in Lansing, Michigan in 1968, and grew up in Holt, Michigan. She competed for Michigan State University, becoming a six-time All-American champion, along with ten Big Ten Conference titles. At the Big Ten meet, she became the champion in the 1-metre springboard and the 3-metre springboard events in the late 1980s and early 1990s. She replicated the feat, by becoming the 1-metre and 3-metre NCAA champion in 1990 and 1991 respectively. In 1990, Farrell-Ovenhouse was named the NCAA Diver of the Year and the Michigan State Sportswoman of the Year. The following year, she was also named the Big Ten Athlete of the Year.

Farrell-Ovenhouse had been a member of the United States national team since 1989. Her performances at the 1992 National Championships earned her a place on the US Olympic team. At the 1992 Summer Olympics in Barcelona, she competed in the women's 3 metre springboard event, finishing in fifth place, with a dive that passed dangerously close to the board, as her hair brushed against it. After missing out on a medal, Farrell-Ovenhouse said that she "went for it in the end" and that she "would have regretted if I didn't go hard".

Following the Olympics, Farrell-Ovenhouse was inducted into the Greater Lansing Area Sports Hall of Fame, and the Michigan State Sports Hall of Fame. She also went on to speak at board meetings at Michigan State University regarding budget cuts in their swimming and diving programs.
