= Inga Afonina =

Russian diver (born 1969)

Personal information
- Born: 26 August 1969 (age 56)

Sport
- Sport: Diving
Medal record
Women's diving
Representing the Soviet Union
European Championships
Silver medal – second place	1989 Bonn	10 m platform
Silver medal – second place	1991 Athens	10 m platform

Inga Nikolayevna Afonina (born 26 August 1969) is a retired diver from Russia, who is best known for winning the silver medal at the 1991 European Championships in the women's 10 m platform, behind Yelena Miroshina. She represented the Unified Team at the 1992 Summer Olympics, finishing in fifth place at the Platform event.

== See also ==
- List of divers
