= Yvonne Köstenberger =

Swiss diver

Personal information
- Nationality: Swiss
- Born: 6 September 1972 (age 52)

Sport
- Sport: Diving

Yvonne Köstenberger (born 6 September 1972) is a Swiss diver. She competed in the women's 10 metre platform event at the 1992 Summer Olympics.
