= Paige Gordon =

Canadian diver (born 1973)

Personal information
- Born: April 25, 1973 (age 53)
Medal record
Women's diving
Representing Canada
Universiade
Silver medal – second place	1993 Buffalo	3 m springboard
Pan American Games
Silver medal – second place	1991 Havana	3m Springboard
Commonwealth Games
Silver medal – second place	1994 Victoria	3m Springboard
Silver medal – second place	1994 Victoria	10m Platform

Paige Parenti-Gordon (born April 25, 1973, in North Vancouver, British Columbia) is a retired diver from Canada, who won the silver medal in the women's 3 metres springboard event at the 1991 Pan American Games in Havana, Cuba.

A member of the Vancouver Aquatic Centre Divers she represented her native country at two consecutive Summer Olympics, starting in 1992.
