= Anna Dacyshyn =

Canadian diver

Personal information
- National team: Canada
- Born: c. 1970 Edmonton, Alberta, Canada
- Home town: Edmonton, Alberta
- Occupation: Diver
- Years active: 1984–c.1991

Sport
- Country: Canada
- Sport: Diving
- Club: University of Alberta; Kinsmen; University of Toronto
- Retired: c.1991

Achievements and titles
- World finals: 1991
- Commonwealth finals: 1990
Medal record
Representing Canada
Commonwealth Games
Gold medal – first place	1990 Auckland	10m platform

Anna Dacyshyn is a Canadian former diver, who won the 10 metre platform event at the 1990 Commonwealth Games, and won six national championships. In 2010, she was inaugurated into the University of Toronto Sports Hall of Fame.

== Career ==
Dacyshyn trained at the University of Alberta, the Kinsmen Sports Centre, and later at the University of Toronto. As a youngster, Dacyshyn won the Girls 15–17 platform, 1 metre and 3 metre diving events at the 1984 British Columbia Diving Championships. In 1985, she won a silver medal in the tower event at the Pan American Invitational Diving Championships. In 1986, at the age of 16, she won the tower event at the Canadian Amateur Diving Association national championships. In the same year, she won her age group platform event at the Western Hemisphere Age-Group Diving Championships. In 1989, she came second in the 10 metre tower event at the national championships.

At the 1990 Commonwealth Games, Dacyshyn won the 10 metre platform event. She had been a favourite to win the event, and was one of two Canadians to win a gold medal in diving at the Games. At the 1991 World Aquatics Championships, she came 11th in the 10 metre platform event. That year, she also came fourth in the 10 metre platform event at the FINA Diving World Cup.

In total, Dacyshyn won six Canadian national championships.

== Post-career ==
After retiring from diving, Dacyshyn studied how retirement affects female sportspeople. In 1996, she was a founder of the Central Toronto Diving Club. In 2010, she was inaugurated into the University of Toronto Sports Hall of Fame.

== Personal life ==
Dacyshyn is from Edmonton, Canada. She has a bachelor's degree in physical education and a master's degree in exercise physiology, both from the University of Toronto. Her husband Jeff Hirst is also a former diver, who was inducted into the University of Toronto Sports Hall of Fame in 2002.
