= Vanessa Baker =

Australian diver (born 1974)

Personal information
- Full name: Vanessa Anne Baker
- Born: 12 June 1974 (age 52) Sydney, New South Wales, Australia
- Height: 172 cm (5 ft 8 in)
- Weight: 62 kg (137 lb)

Sport
- Country: Australia
- Sport: Diving

Vanessa Anne Baker (born 12 June 1974) is a former Australian diver.

Born in Sydney, Australia Baker was educated at MLC Burwood. At age 14, Baker won a AU$1,500 scholarship and was the youngest to represent Australia on the Southern Cross International Circuit.

In Australia she won her age championship in 1990 and went on to be national platform diving champion in 1992. She also won gold in the 1992 junior national championships held in Melbourne in the 16–18 age group.

She competed at the 1990 Commonwealth Games in the 10 metre platform event and finished tenth. In the 1994 Commonwealth Games she competed in two events. In the 3 metre springboard event she finished fourth, while in the 10 metre platform she came eighth.

She competed at the 1996 Atlanta Olympics in the 10 metre platform event where she finished 25th of 33.
