= Debbie Fuller =

Canadian diver (born 1966)

Personal information
- Full name: Deborah Lynne Fuller
- National team: Canada
- Born: 24 June 1966 (age 59) Montreal, Quebec, Canada
- Height: 1.62 m (5 ft 4 in)
- Weight: 57 kg (126 lb)

Sport
- Sport: Diving
- Event(s): Springboard, 1m & 3m Platform, 10m
- College team: University of Florida
- Club: Pointe-Claire Diving Club
Medal record
Women's diving
Representing Canada
Pan American Games
Bronze medal – third place	1987 Indianapolis	3m springboard
Commonwealth Games
Gold medal – first place	1986 Edinburgh	3m springboard
Gold medal – first place	1986 Edinburgh	10m platform

Deborah Lynne Fuller (born 24 June 1966) is a former competition diver who represented Canada at two consecutive Summer Olympics, starting in 1984. She won a bronze medal at the 1987 Pan American Games in and two gold medals at the 1986 Commonwealth Games.

== Early years ==
Fuller was born in Montreal, Quebec. Her older sister, Wendy Fuller, also competed as an international diver.

== Education ==
Fuller accepted an athletic scholarship to attend the University of Florida in Gainesville, Florida, where she dove for coach Randy Reese's Florida Gators swimming and diving team in National Collegiate Athletic Association (NCAA) competition from 1984 to 1987. She was recognized as an All-American four times during her American college career, and won the Southeastern Conference (SEC) individual championship in the one-meter springboard diving event in 1985.

== See also ==
- Florida Gators
- List of University of Florida alumni
- List of University of Florida Olympians
