= Julia Cruz =

Spanish diver

Personal information
- Full name: Julia María Cruz Palacios
- Nationality: Spanish
- Born: 7 September 1968 (age 57) Madrid, Spain

Sport
- Sport: Diving
Medal record
Women's diving
Representing Spain
European Championships
Bronze medal – third place	1997 Seville	3 m synchro

Julia Cruz (born 7 September 1968) is a Spanish diver. She competed at the 1992 Summer Olympics and the 1996 Summer Olympics.
