= Monika Kühn =

German diver

Personal information
- Nationality: German
- Born: 2 April 1967 (age 57); Aachen, West Germany

Sport
- Sport: Diving

Monika Kühn (born 2 April 1967) is a German diver. She competed at the 1988 Summer Olympics representing West Germany and the 1992 Summer Olympics representing unified Germany.
