= April Adams =

Australian Olympic diver

Personal information
- Full name: April Jane Adams
- Nationality: Australian
- Born: 19 July 1973 (age 52) Sydney, Australia

Sport
- Sport: Diving
- Event: Womans 10 meter platform
Medal record
Diving
Representing Australia
Commonwealth Games
Silver medal – second place	1990 Auckland	Women's Platform

April Jane Adams (born 19 July 1973) is an Australian former diver. She competed in the 1992 Summer Olympics and placed second in the 1990 Commonwealth Games.
