= Jeffrey Arbon =

British diver

Personal information
- Born: 17 November 1967 (age 58) Hitchin, Hertfordshire, England

Jeffrey John Arbon (born 1967), is a former diver who competed for Great Britain and England.

== Diving career ==
Arbon represented Great Britain at the 1988 Summer Olympics.

He represented England in both the springboard and platform events, at the 1986 Commonwealth Games in Edinburgh, Scotland. Four years later he represented England again in both events, at the 1990 Commonwealth Games in Auckland, New Zealand.

He was a member of the Essex Cormorants Diving Club.
