= Luisella Bisello =

Italian diver (born 1968)

Personal information
- Nationality: Italian
- Born: 16 March 1968 (age 57); Verona, Italy

Sport
- Sport: Diving

Luisella Bisello (born 16 March 1968) is an Italian diver. She competed in two events at the 1992 Summer Olympics.
