= Michael Murphy (diver) =

Australian diver

Personal information
- Born: 29 November 1973 (age 52)
Medal record
Men's diving
Representing Australia
Commonwealth Games
| Gold medal – first place | 1994 Victoria | 3m Springboard |
| Gold medal – first place | 1994 Victoria | 10m Platform |
| Silver medal – second place | 1994 Victoria | 1m Springboard |

Michael Andrew Murphy (born 29 November 1973 in Brisbane, Queensland) is a former Olympic diver for Australia. He was an Australian Institute of Sport scholarship holder. Murphy competed twice at the Olympic Games (in 1992 and 1996), placing 4th in the 3-metre springboard event at the 1992 Games in Barcelona.

Murphy also represented Australia twice at the Commonwealth Games (in 1990 and 1994), winning two gold medals and one silver medal at the 1994 Games in Victoria (Canada). After retiring from competitive diving, Murphy served as both a Board Member and National Team Selector for Diving Australia. In recognition of his contribution to the sporting community, he was awarded the Australian Sports Medal (an Australian federal government honour) in 2000.

Murphy completed his undergraduate studies at Bond University, where he gained a Bachelor of Commerce (BCom) and a Bachelor of Laws with Honours (LLB (Hons)). He was winner of both the Sir Robert Gordon Menzies Scholarship to Harvard, and the Macquarie Bank Graduate Management Scholarship. He holds a Master of Business Administration (MBA) from Harvard Business School. He is currently a managing director with Bain Capital, and was previously a management consultant with Bain & Company.
