= Tracy Cox-Smyth =

Zimbabwean diver

Personal information
- Born: 13 July 1966 (age 59)

Sport
- Sport: Diving
Medal record
Representing Zimbabwe
Commonwealth Games
Silver medal – second place	1990 Auckland	1m springboard

Tracy Linda Cox-Smyth (born 13 July 1966) is a retired Zimbabwean springboard diver. She is a Commonwealth silver medallist and competed at the 1988 and 1992 Olympics.

She attended Arizona State University as an undergraduate. She was Pac-10 Champion in 1987 in both the 1m and 3m springboard, and was Diving All-American in 1985 and 1987.

At the 1982 Commonwealth Games in Brisbane, she placed 10th in the 10m platform and 9th in the 3m springboard.

At the 1988 Summer Olympics in Seoul, she reached the finals of the 3 m springboard, coming 12th. In the same event four years later in Barcelona, she came 13th in qualifying, thus missing out by one place on reaching the finals.

At the 1990 Commonwealth Games in Auckland, she won a silver in the 1m Springboard event, losing gold to Mary DePiero of Canada. She was one of only three Zimbabweans to medal in the games, along with boxers Nokuthula Tshabangu (silver) and Duke Chinyadza (bronze). At the 1994 Games, she came 5th in both the 1m and the 3m Springboard events.

At the 1991 World Aquatics Championships, she came 9th in the 3 m springboard.

== Personal Details ==
Her father Geoff was a former diver and respected diving coach who was involved in the Zimbabwean diving community for over three decades. He ran the Geoff Cox Adventure Center in Nyanga, Zimbabwe, where hundreds of schoolchildren attended camps over several years.
