= Jodie Rogers =

Australian diver

Personal information
- Born: 17 May 1970 (age 56) Melbourne, Australia

Sport
- Event: Diving
Medal record
Commonwealth Games
Silver medal – second place	1994 Victoria	1m springboard
Bronze medal – third place	1994 Victoria	3m springboard

Jodie Rogers (born 17 May 1970) is an Australian diver.

Rogers competed in the 1996 Summer Olympics in Atlanta where she came 15th in the women's 3m springboard event. She also competed in the 1994 Commonwealth Games where she won a silver medal in the 1m springboard event and a bronze medal in the 3m springboard event.
