= Irina Lashko =

Russian diver (born 1973)

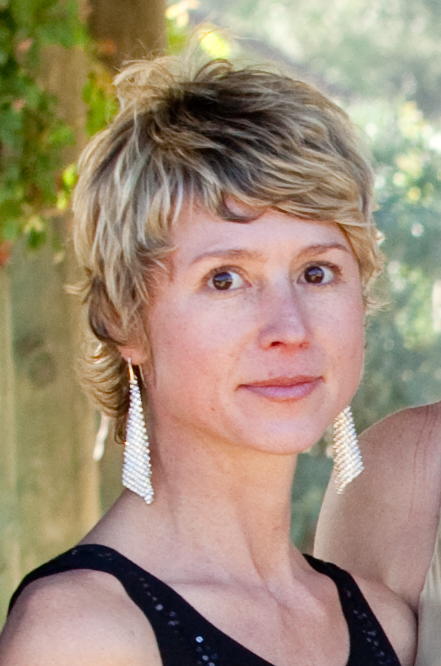

Personal information
- Born: 25 January 1973 (age 53) Samara, Russian SFSR, Soviet Union

Sport
- Country: Australia
- Event(s): 1m, 3m, 3m synchro
- Club: Melam Diving Club
Medal record
Women's diving
Olympic Games
Representing the Unified Team
Silver medal – second place	1992 Barcelona	3 m springboard
Representing Russia
Silver medal – second place	1996 Atlanta	3 m springboard
Representing Australia
Bronze medal – third place	2004 Athens	Springboard synchro
World Championships
Representing Soviet Union
Silver medal – second place	1991 Perth	3 m springboard
Representing Russia
Gold medal – first place	1998 Perth	1 m springboard
Gold medal – first place	1998 Perth	Springboard synchro
Representing Australia
Gold medal – first place	2003 Barcelona	1 m springboard
Silver medal – second place	2001 Fukuoka	3 m springboard
Commonwealth Games
Representing Australia
Gold medal – first place	2002 Manchester	1 m springboard
Gold medal – first place	2002 Manchester	3 m springboard
European Championships
Representing the Soviet Union
Gold medal – first place	1989 Bonn	1 m springboard
Gold medal – first place	1991 Athens	3 m springboard
Silver medal – second place	1991 Athens	1 m springboard
Representing Russia
Silver medal – second place	1993 Sheffield	1 m springboard
Silver medal – second place	1997 Seville	1 m springboard
Silver medal – second place	1997 Seville	Springboard synchro
Silver medal – second place	1999 Istanbul	1 m springboard
Silver medal – second place	1999 Istanbul	3 m springboard
Universiade
Representing Russia
Silver medal – second place	1999 Palma de Mallorca	1 m springboard
Silver medal – second place	1999 Palma de Mallorca	3 m springboard

Irina Lashko (Russian: Ирина Лашко; born 25 January 1973) is a Russian diver who, after her marriage with an Australian, became known as Irina Furler.

Lashko competed in four Summer Olympics, and represented four countries: the Soviet Union (1988), Unified Team (1992), Russia (1996) and Australia (2004). She won a total number of three Olympic medals, two silver and one bronze. Lashko was affiliated with the Melam Diving Club.
