= Ágnes Gerlach =

Hungarian diver

Personal information
- Nationality: Hungarian
- Born: 22 July 1968 (age 56); Budapest, Hungary

Sport
- Sport: Diving

Ágnes Gerlach-Miller (born 22 July 1968) is a Hungarian diver. She competed at the 1988 Summer Olympics and the 1992 Summer Olympics.
