= Vyninka Arlow =

Australian diver (born 1974)

Personal information
- Born: March 25, 1974 (age 52) Perth, Western Australia

Sport
- Country: Australia
- Sport: Diving

Achievements and titles
- Olympic finals: 1992 Barcelona Olympics and 1996 Atlanta Olympics
Medal record
Commonwealth Games
Gold medal – first place	1998 Kuala Lumpur	10 metre platform

Vyninka Arlow (born 25 March 1974) is an Australian former diver who competed in the 1992 Summer Olympics in the 10 meter women's platform where she came 10th. She also competed in the 1996 Summer Olympics. She won a gold medal at the 1998 Commonwealth Games in the 10 metre springboard event.

Vyninka is currently the Elite Pathway Program Coach at the Australian Institute of Sport diving program in Brisbane, Australia.

She is the daughter of Robyn Bradshaw, also a competitive diver.
