= Naomi Bishop =

British diver

Personal information
- Nationality: England
- Born: 19 August 1967 (age 57); Manchester

Naomi Bishop (born 19 August 1967) is a female former diver who competed for Great Britain and England. Bishop represented Great Britain at the 1988 Summer Olympics and the 1992 Summer Olympics.

She also represented England in the 1 metre and 3 metres springboard events, at the 1990 Commonwealth Games in Auckland, New Zealand and was a member of the Oldham Diving Club.
