= Daphne Jongejans =

Dutch diver (born 1965)

Daphne Jongejans Bousquet
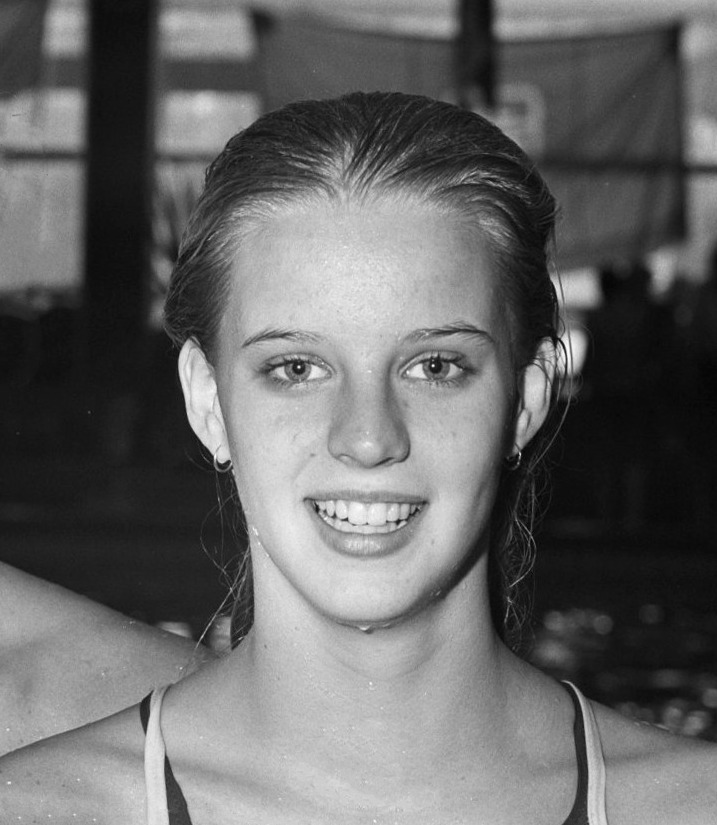
- Jongejans In 1984

Personal information
- Full name: Daphne Cérès Jongejans
- Nationality: Dutch
- Born: 22 June 1965 (age 61) Amstelveen, North Holland
- Height: 5 ft 6 in (1.68 m) (1984)
- Weight: 130 lb (59 kg) (1984)
- Website: eventstrategysolutions.com

Sport
- Country: Netherlands
- Sport: Women's Diving
- Event: 3m Springboard
- University team: University of Miami

Achievements and titles
- Highest world ranking: 3rd
Medal record
Women's diving
Representing the Netherlands
European Championships
Gold medal – first place	1987 Strasbourg	3m Springboard
Bronze medal – third place	1983 Rome	3m Springboard

Daphne Cérès Jongejans (born 22 June 1965 in Badhoevedorp, North Holland) is a retired female diver from the Netherlands, who represented her native country at three consecutive Summer Olympics: 1984, 1988 and 1992.

== Background ==
Jongejans' best Olympic performance was finishing in eighth place at the 1988 Summer Olympics, in the women's 3 metres springboard event.

She is a graduate of the University of Miami, and is in their sports hall of fame.

She is married to Scott Bousquet and has two children. She resides outside of Atlanta, Georgia and works as an event planner.
