= Mary DePiero =

Canadian diver (born 1968)

Personal information
- Born: 14 May 1968 (age 58) Thunder Bay, Ontario, Canada
- Children: Jordan Carroll

Sport
- Event: Diving
Medal record
Commonwealth Games
Gold medal – first place	1990 Auckland	1m springboard
Bronze medal – third place	1994 Victoria	1m springboard

Mary DePiero (born 14 May 1968) is a Canadian diver.

DePiero competed in the 1992 Summer Olympics in Barcelona. She won a gold medal in the 1m springboard event at the 1990 Commonwealth Games and a bronze medal in the same event at the 1994 Commonwealth Games.
