= Bob Morgan (diver) =

British diver

Personal information
- Full name: Robert Quentin Morgan
- Born: 27 March 1967 (age 59) Cardiff
- Height: 174 cm (5 ft 9 in)
- Weight: 72 kg (159 lb)
Medal record
Men's diving
European Championships
Representing the United Kingdom
Silver medal – second place	1993 Sheffield	10 m platform
Bronze medal – third place	1991 Athens	10 m platform
Commonwealth Games
Representing Wales
Gold medal – first place	1990 Auckland	10 m platform
Silver medal – second place	1994 Victoria	10 m platform
Bronze medal – third place	1986 Edinburgh	10 m platform

Robert ("Bob", "Bobby" or "Robby") Morgan (born 27 March 1967) is a retired Welsh diver, who competing for Wales and Great Britain is best known for winning a bronze and a silver medal in the men's 10 m platform at the European Championships in the early 1990s, and the first Welsh diver to win gold at the Commonwealth Games.

Born in Cardiff and raised in Llantwit Major, Morgan represented the United Kingdom at four consecutive Summer Olympics, starting in 1984 (Los Angeles, California); and at five consecutive Commonwealth Games, in 1982, 1986, 1990, 1994 and 1998, winning three medals—bronze, silver and gold.

Having been a roommate with millionaire tennis player Greg Rusedski in Atlanta, in the aftermath of Great Britain's disastrous performance at the 1996 Summer Olympics, Morgan and fellow diver Tony Ally were forced to sell their team kit to passersby on the street in order to pay off loans, something seen as the nadir of an already poor British performance. It was regularly cited as an example of how poorly funded British sport was before lottery funding of athletes was introduced in time for the 2000 Summer Olympics. Leon Taylor, a British diver who won a silver medal at the 2004 Summer Olympics, suggested that Morgan & Ally's actions shamed the British Olympic Association into arranging for more professional funding of British Olympians.

Post the 1996 Atlanta Olympics, aged 29 Morgan took a summer job show-diving at Legoland in a pirate show, and the following summer worked the summer season at Thorpe Park, and performing in pantomime in South Wales the winter. After then working odd jobs, including a period with Tesco's, he joined an estate agency run by former Welsh International rugby players. Now running his own estate agency business in Bridgend and married with three children, Morgan's daughter Mali competed in gymnastics as part of Team Wales at the 2022 Commonwealth Games in Birmingham. She is competing for the University of Pittsburgh in Pittsburgh, Pennsylvania, USA.
