= Tania Paterson =

New Zealand diver

Personal information
- Born: 23 June 1972 (age 54) Hamilton, New Zealand

Sport
- Sport: Diving

Tania Paterson (born 23 June 1972) is a retired competitive diver from New Zealand.

Paterson was born in Hamilton, New Zealand in 1972. She was on the New Zealand national diving team for twelve years and represented New Zealand internationally three times: at the 1990 Commonwealth Games, the 1992 Summer Olympics and the 1994 Commonwealth Games. She competed in the 10m platform event and the 3m springboard; her best result was sixth place in the 10m platform diving event at the 1990 Commonwealth Games.

Paterson went on to coach young people in diving, and studied remedial therapy, specialising in sports massage and working with elite athletes. Paterson later moved to Adelaide, Australia for a coaching position with Diving South Australia and the South Australian Sports Institute. She then moved to Melbourne and worked for Hockey Australia and Professional Footballers Australia.
