= David Bédard =

Canadian diver (born 1965)

Personal information
- Born: October 23, 1965 (age 61) Montreal, Quebec, Canada
Medal record
Men's diving
Representing Canada
Pan American Games
Bronze medal – third place	1987 Indianapolis	Platform
Bronze medal – third place	1995 Mar del Plata	Springboard
Commonwealth Games
Silver medal – second place	1986 Edinburgh	10 m platform
Silver medal – second place	1990 Henderson	1 m springboard
Silver medal – second place	1990 Henderson	10 m platform

David Peter Bédard (born October 23, 1965) is a retired diver from Canada, who represented his native country at four consecutive Summer Olympics, starting in 1984. He competed at the Los Angeles Olympics in 1984, Seoul in 1988, Barcelona in 1992, and Atlanta 1996. He twice won a medal at the Pan American Games (1987 and 1995). He won a silver medal at the 1986 Commonwealth Games and two silver medals at the 1990 Commonwealth Games. He was coached by Don Webb and represented the Pointe-Claire Diving Club (PCDC) as an athlete from 1978-1996. He is currently the Assistant Head Coach of PCDC. He was the recipient of Diving Canada's Coaching Impact Award in 2023

Olympic Highlights: In 1984 in Los Angeles, he placed 8th in Men's 10m platform. In 1988 in Seoul, he placed 11th in Men's 10m platform. In 1988 in Seoul, he placed 10th in Men's 3m Springboard. In 1992 in Barcelona, he placed 13th in Men's 3m Springboard. In 1996 in Atlanta, he placed 19th in Men's 3m Springboard.
