= Craig Rogerson =

Australian diver (born 1965)

Personal information
- Nationality: Australian
- Born: 15 July 1965 (age 60)

Sport
- Sport: Diving
Medal record
Diving
Representing Australia
Commonwealth Games
Gold medal – first place	1986 Edinburgh	Men's 10m Platform
Bronze medal – third place	1986 Edinburgh	Men's 3m Springboard
Gold medal – first place	1990 Auckland	Men's 3m Springboard

Craig William Rogerson (born 15 July 1965) is an Australian former diver who competed in the 1988 Summer Olympics and in the 1992 Summer Olympics. After taking a few years off he returned in the Atlanta 1996 Summer Olympics, ranking 12th in the platform event. He is openly gay.

At the 1986 Commonwealth Games, he won the gold medal in the Men's 10m Platform and the bronze medal in the Men's 3m Springboard.
