= Jenny Donnet =

Australian diver

Personal information
- Full name: Jennifer Barbara Donnet
- Born: 26 May 1963 (age 63)
- Height: 1.64 m (5 ft 5 in)

Sport
- Country: Australia
- Event: 3m springboard
Medal record
Representing Australia
Women's Diving
Commonwealth Games
Gold medal – first place	1982 Brisbane	3m springboard
Gold medal – first place	1990 Auckland	3m springboard
Silver medal – second place	1986 Edinburgh	3m springboard

Jennifer Barbara Donnet (born 26 May 1963) is a retired Australian competitive diver.

She was the first woman in any sport to represent Australia at four Olympic Games, competing in 1980 (Moscow), 1984 (Los Angeles), 1988 (Seoul) and 1992 (Barcelona). She was the Olympic Team Captain and Australian flag bearer at the Opening Ceremony of the 1992 Summer Olympics in Barcelona.

Donnet won gold medals in the 3m springboard event at the 1982 and 1990 Commonwealth Games, and silver in the event at the 1986 Games. She is a member of the Australian Diving Hall of Fame.

Her father, Tom Donnet, was an Olympic Diving Coach and her mother, Barbara McAulay, was also a diver who won gold and silver medals in the 1954 Empire and Commonwealth Games (Vancouver), and competed at the 1956 Melbourne Olympics.
