= Yelena Miroshina =

Soviet diver

Personal information
- Born: 5 June 1974 Moscow, Soviet Union
- Died: 18 December 1995 (aged 21) Moscow, Russia
- Height: 142 cm (4 ft 8 in)

Sport
- Sport: Diving
- Club: Spartak, Moscow
- Coached by: T. M. Petrukhina
Medal record
Olympic Games
Representing the Unified Team
Silver medal – second place	1992 Barcelona	10 m platform
World Championships
Representing the Soviet Union
Silver medal – second place	1991 Perth	10 m platform
European Championships
Representing the Soviet Union
Gold medal – first place	1987 Strasbourg	10 m platform
Gold medal – first place	1991 Athens	10 m platform

Yelena Nikolaevna Miroshina (Russian: Елена Николаевна Мирошина, 5 June 1974 – 18 December 1995) was a Russian diver, best known for twice winning the gold medal at the European Championships in the 10 m platform, and winning Olympic silver in 1992, where in the final she progressed from 8th place after 4 jumps to second.

Miroshina competed in two consecutive Summer Olympics, and represented two countries: the Soviet Union (1988) and the Unified Team (1992). She was affiliated with Spartak during her career. Miroshina was the youngest participant among the 89 (49 men and 40 women) competitors from 31 countries at the Seoul Games, with 14 years and 105 days.

Miroshina retired from competitions in 1995. The same year she was found dead under the windows of her apartment in Moscow. She was pregnant at the time of her death. The cause of death remains unknown.

== See also ==
- List of divers
