= China at the 2000 Summer Olympics =

- IOC code: CHN
- NOC: Chinese Olympic Committee
- Website: www.olympic.cn (in Chinese and English)

in Sydney
- Competitors: 271 (91 men and 180 women) in 28 sports
- Flag bearer: Liu Yudong
- Medals Ranked 3rd: Gold 28 Silver 16 Bronze 14 Total 58

Summer Olympics appearances (overview)
- 1952; 1956–1980; 1984; 1988; 1992; 1996; 2000; 2004; 2008; 2012; 2016; 2020; 2024; 2028

Other related appearances
- Republic of China (1924–1948)

The People's Republic of China competed at the 2000 Summer Olympics in Sydney, Australia. The team excluded athletes from the Special Administrative Region of Hong Kong, after the territory's return to Chinese rule in 1997, and which competed separately as Hong Kong, China.

Sydney 2000 marked the first time the Chinese Olympic team competed in Australia as China boycotted the 1956 Summer Olympics in Melbourne due to the participation of Republic of China at these games.

271 competitors, 91 men and 180 women, took part in 163 events in 28 sports. China finished for the first time in the top 3 with 28 gold medals. China also broke the record for the most gold medals won by Asian countries at a single Summer Olympics (28), which was previously set by Japan in 1964 (16) and by China in 1992 (16) and 1996 (16).

== Medalists ==
Medals by sport
Sport	1st place, gold medalist(s)	2nd place, silver medalist(s)	3rd place, bronze medalist(s)	Total
Diving	5	5	0	10
Weightlifting	5	1	1	7
Table tennis	4	3	1	8
Badminton	4	1	3	8
Shooting	3	2	3	8
Gymnastics	3	2	2	7
Judo	2	1	1	4
Athletics	1	0	0	1
Taekwondo	1	0	0	1
Fencing	0	1	1	2
Cycling	0	0	1	1
Wrestling	0	0	1	1
Total	28	16	14	58

Medal	Name	Sport	Event	Date
Gold	Wang Liping	Athletics	Women's 20 km walk	28 September
Gold	Ji Xinpeng	Badminton	Men's singles	23 September
Gold	Gong Zhichao	Badminton	Women's singles	22 September
Gold	Ge Fei, Gu Jun	Badminton	Women's doubles	23 September
Gold	Gao Ling, Zhang Jun	Badminton	Mixed doubles	21 September
Gold	Xiong Ni	Diving	Men's 3 m springboard	26 September
Gold	Tian Liang	Diving	Men's 10 m platform	30 September
Gold	Xiao Hailiang, Xiong Ni	Diving	Men's synchronized 3 m springboard	28 September
Gold	Fu Mingxia	Diving	Women's 3 m springboard	28 September
Gold	Li Na, Sang Xue	Diving	Women's synchronized 10 m platform	28 September
Gold	Huang Xu, Li Xiaopeng, Xiao Junfeng, Xing Aowei, Yang Wei, Zheng Lihui	Gymnastics	Men's team all-around	18 September
Gold	Li Xiaopeng	Gymnastics	Men's parallel bars	25 September
Gold	Liu Xuan	Gymnastics	Women's balance beam	25 September
Gold	Tang Lin	Judo	Women's 78 kg	21 September
Gold	Yuan Hua	Judo	Women's +78 kg	22 September
Gold	Cai Yalin	Shooting	Men's 10 m air rifle	18 September
Gold	Yang Ling	Shooting	Men's 10 m running target	23 September
Gold	Tao Luna	Shooting	Women's 10 m air pistol	17 September
Gold	Kong Linghui	Table tennis	Men's singles	25 September
Gold	Wang Liqin, Yan Sen	Table tennis	Men's doubles	23 September
Gold	Wang Nan	Table tennis	Women's singles	24 September
Gold	Li Ju, Wang Nan	Table tennis	Women's doubles	22 September
Gold	Chen Zhong	Taekwondo	Women's +67 kg	30 September
Gold	Zhan Xugang	Weightlifting	Men's 77 kg	22 September
Gold	Yang Xia	Weightlifting	Women's 53 kg	18 September
Gold	Chen Xiaomin	Weightlifting	Women's 63 kg	19 September
Gold	Lin Weining	Weightlifting	Women's 69 kg	19 September
Gold	Ding Meiyuan	Weightlifting	Women's +75 kg	22 September
Silver	Huang Nanyan, Yang Wei	Badminton	Women's doubles	23 September
Silver	Hu Jia	Diving	Men's 10 m platform	30 September
Silver	Hu Jia, Tian Liang	Diving	Men's synchronized 10 m platform	23 September
Silver	Guo Jingjing	Diving	Women's 3 m springboard	28 September
Silver	Li Na	Diving	Women's 10 m platform	24 September
Silver	Fu Mingxia, Guo Jingjing	Diving	Women's synchronized 3 m springboard	23 September
Silver	Dong Zhaozhi, Wang Haibin, Ye Chong	Fencing	Men's team foil	22 September
Silver	Yang Wei	Gymnastics	Men's individual all-around	20 September
Silver	Ling Jie	Gymnastics	Women's uneven bars	24 September
Silver	Li Shufang	Judo	Women's 63 kg	18 September
Silver	Wang Yifu	Shooting	Men's 10 m air pistol	16 September
Silver	Tao Luna	Shooting	Women's 25 m pistol	22 September
Silver	Kong Linghui, Liu Guoliang	Table tennis	Men's doubles	23 September
Silver	Li Ju	Table tennis	Women's singles	24 September
Silver	Sun Jin, Yang Ying	Table tennis	Women's doubles	22 September
Silver	Wu Wenxiong	Weightlifting	Men's 56 kg	16 September
Bronze	Xia Xuanze	Badminton	Men's singles	23 September
Bronze	Ye Zhaoying	Badminton	Women's singles	22 September
Bronze	Gao Ling, Qin Yiyuan	Badminton	Women's doubles	23 September
Bronze	Jiang Cuihua	Cycling	Women's track time trial	16 September
Bronze	Li Na, Liang Qin, Yang Shaoqi	Fencing	Women's team épée	19 September
Bronze	Liu Xuan (Note: Medals were awarded on 25 September 2000 after Romanian Andreea Răducan disqualified due to medical substance.)	Gymnastics	Individual all-around	21 September
Bronze	Yang Yun	Gymnastics	Women's uneven bars	24 September
Bronze	Liu Yuxiang	Judo	Women's 52 kg	17 September
Bronze	Niu Zhiyuan	Shooting	Men's 10 m running target	23 September
Bronze	Gao Jing	Shooting	Women's 10 m air rifle	16 September
Bronze	Gao E	Shooting	Women's trap	18 September
Bronze	Liu Guoliang	Table tennis	Men's singles	25 September
Bronze	Zhang Xiangxiang	Weightlifting	Men's 56 kg	16 September
Bronze	Sheng Zetian	Wrestling	Men's Greco-Roman 58 kg	27 September

== Competitors ==
The following is the list of number of competitors in the Games.

Sport	Men	Women	Total
Archery	3	3	6
Athletics	6	20	26
Badminton	7	10	17
Basketball	12	0	12
Boxing	3	–	3
Cycling	0	3	3
Diving	4	4	8
Fencing	6	7	13
Field hockey	0	15	15
Football	0	13	13
Gymnastics	6	7	13
Judo	5	7	12
Modern pentathlon	1	1	2
Rowing	4	6	10
Sailing	1	3	4
Shooting	10	11	21
Softball	–	15	15
Swimming	6	15	21
Synchronized swimming	–	9	9
Table tennis	5	4	9
Taekwondo	1	2	3
Tennis	0	3	3
Triathlon	0	2	2
Volleyball	0	16	16
Weightlifting	6	4	10
Wrestling	5	–	5
Total	91	180	271

== Results by event ==
Unless otherwise indicated, all results are derived from the Official Report of the XXVII Olympiad.

== Archery ==
Defending silver medalist He Ying was defeated by one of the Korean women in the round of 16.

=== Individual events ===
Athlete	Event	Ranking round		Round of 64	Round of 32	Round of 16	Quarterfinals	Semifinals	Final / BM	
Athlete	Event	Score	Seed	Opposition Score	Opposition Score	Opposition Score	Opposition Score	Opposition Score	Opposition Score	Rank
Fu Shengjun	Men's individual	635	16	Mikos (POL); L 155–157	did not advance					
Tang Hua	Men's individual	619	38	Gray (AUS); W 163–161	Petersson (SWE); L 148–157	did not advance				
Yang Bo	Men's individual	632	22	Kurchenko (UKR); W 164–155	Stubbe (GER); W 159–152	Petersson (SWE); L 164–167	did not advance			
He Ying	Women's individual	638	14	Hess (NOR); W 160–145	Pfohl (GER); W 163–157	Kim N-s (KOR); L 162–165	did not advance			
Yang Jianping	Women's individual	633	25	Asano (JPN); W 156–154	Liu P-y (TPE); W 160–157	Nowicka (POL); L 158–162	did not advance			
Yu Hui	Women's individual	643	11	Y Pérez (CUB); L 159–155	did not advance					

=== Teams ===
Athlete	Event	Ranking round		Round of 16	Quarterfinals	Semifinals	Final / BM	
Athlete	Event	Score	Seed	Opposition Score	Opposition Score	Opposition Score	Opposition Score	Rank
Fu Shengjun; Tang Hua; Yang Bo	Men's team	1886	8	Ukraine; L 235–244	did not advance			
He Ying; Yang Jianping; Yu Hui	Women's team	1914	6	Bye	Germany; L 234–240	did not advance		

== Athletics ==
=== Men's track ===
Athlete	Event	Heat		Quarterfinal		Semifinal		Final	
Athlete	Event	Result	Rank	Result	Rank	Result	Rank	Result	Rank
Yu Guohui	20km walk	—N/a						1:22:32 SB	13
Wang Yinhang	50km walk	—N/a						3:50:19 PB	13
Yang Yongjian	50km walk	—N/a						3:48:42 PB	10

=== Men's field ===
Athlete	Event	Qualification		Final	
Athlete	Event	Distance	Position	Distance	Position
Li Shaojie	Discus throw	62.29	8	did not advance	
Lao Jianfeng	Long jump	7.41	40	did not advance	
Liu Honglin	Long jump	NM		did not advance	
Lao Jianfeng	Triple jump	16.43	21	did not advance	

=== Women's track ===
Athlete	Event	Heat		Quarterfinal		Semifinal		Final	
Athlete	Event	Result	Rank	Result	Rank	Result	Rank	Result	Rank
Li Xuemei	100m	11.25 SB	11 Q	11.46	21	did not advance			
Zeng Xiujun	100m	11.63	43	did not advance					
Qin Wangping	200m	24.10	45	did not advance					
Liu Xiaomei	200m	23.56	37	did not advance					
Li Ji	10,000m	32:28.96	6 Q	—N/a				31:06.94	7
Feng Yun	100m hurdles	13.19	26	—N/a					
Li Xuemei; Liu Xiaomei; Qin Wangping; Zeng Xiujun	4 × 100 m relay	43.07 SB	5 Q	—N/a		43.04 SB	8 q	44.87	8
Ren Xiujuan	Marathon	—N/a						2:27:55	10
Liu Hongyu	20km walk	—N/a						DSQ	
Wang Liping	20km walk	—N/a						1:29:05 OR	1st place, gold medalist(s)

=== Women's field ===
Athlete	Event	Qualification		Final	
Athlete	Event	Distance	Position	Distance	Position
Cao Qi	Discus throw	58.03	21	did not advance	
Li Qiumei	Discus throw	56.59	22	did not advance	
Yu Xin	Discus throw	61.00	11 Q	58.34	13
Zhao Wei	Hammer throw	59.54	20	did not advance	
Li Lei	Javelin throw	60.57	9 Q	56.83	11
Wei Jianhua	Javelin throw	60.64	8 Q	58.33	10
Gao Shuying	Pole vault	4.40	7 q	4.15	10
Cheng Xiaoyan	Shot put	18.42	10 Q	17.85	11
Yu Xin	Shot put	16.18	24	did not advance	
Guan Yingnan	Long jump	6.48	18	did not advance	
Guo Chunfang	Long jump	NM		did not advance	
Ren Ruiping	Triple jump	13.16	26	did not advance	

== Badminton ==
=== Men ===
==== Singles ====
Athlete	Event	Round of 32	Round of 16	Quarterfinal	Semifinal	Final / BM	
Athlete	Event	Opposition Score	Opposition Score	Opposition Score	Opposition Score	Opposition Score	Rank
Ji Xinpeng	Men's singles	Ng (HKG); W 7–15, 15–4, 15–11	Han (USA); W 15–3, 15–6	Hidayat (INA); W 15–12, 15–5	Gade (DEN); W 15–9, 1–15, 15–9	Hendrawan (INA); W 15–4, 15–13	1st place, gold medalist(s)
Sun Jun	Men's singles	Høyer Larsen (DEN); W 15–3, 16–17, 15–10	Vaughan (GBR); W 15–10, 15–8	Hendrawan (INA); L 13–15, 5–15	did not advance		
Xia Xuanze	Men's singles	Masuda (JPN); W 15–4, 12–15, 15–8	Stojanov (BUL); W 15–11, 15–2	Wong CH (MAS); W 17–15, 15–11	Hendrawan (INA); L 12–15, 4–15	Bronze medal match Gade (DEN); W 15–13, 15–5	3rd place, bronze medalist(s)

==== Doubles ====
Athlete	Event	Round of 32	Round of 16	Quarterfinal	Semifinal	Final / BM	
Athlete	Event	Opposition Score	Opposition Score	Opposition Score	Opposition Score	Opposition Score	Rank
Chen Qiqiu; Yu Jinhao	Men's doubles	Cheah (MAS); Yap (MAS); L 15–4, 16–17, 10–15	did not advance				
Zhang Jun; Zhang Wei	Men's doubles	Moody (CAN); Olynyk (CAN); W/O	did not advance				

=== Women ===
==== Singles ====
Athlete	Event	Round of 32	Round of 16	Quarterfinal	Semifinal	Final / BM	
Athlete	Event	Opposition Score	Opposition Score	Opposition Score	Opposition Score	Opposition Score	Rank
Dai Yun	Women's singles	Karachkova (RUS); W 11–3, 11–5	Yonekura (JPN); W 11–2, 11–5	Kim J-h (KOR); W 11–3, 11–4	Martin (DEN); L 5–11, 0–11	Bronze medal match Ye Z (CHN); L 11–8, 2–11, 6–11	4
Gong Zhichao	Women's singles	Ling W (HKG); W 11–4, 11–3	Djaelawijaya (INA); W 11–9, 11–3	Mizui (JPN); W 11–6, 11–3	Ye Z (CHN); W 11–8, 11–8	Martin (DEN); W 13–10, 11–3	1st place, gold medalist(s)
Ye Zhaoying	Women's singles	Meulendijks (NED); W 11–3, 9–11, 11–7	Sorensen (DEN); W 11–4, 11–6	Huang C-c (TPE); W 11–3, 11–4	Gong Z (CHN); L 8–11, 8–11	Bronze medal match Dai (CHN); W 8–11, 11–2, 11–6	3rd place, bronze medalist(s)

==== Doubles ====
Athlete	Event	Round of 32	Round of 16	Quarterfinal	Semifinal	Final / BM	
Athlete	Event	Opposition Score	Opposition Score	Opposition Score	Opposition Score	Opposition Score	Rank
Gao Ling; Qin Yiyuan	Women's doubles	Boteva (BUL); Koleva (BUL); W 15–1, 15–9	Iwata (JPN); Matsuda (JPN); W 15–5, 15–5	Goode (GBR); Kellogg (GBR); W 15–2, 15–7	Ge F (CHN); Gu J (CHN); L 7–15, 12–15	Bronze medal match Chung J-h (KOR); Ra (KOR); W 15–10, 15–4	3rd place, bronze medalist(s)
Ge Fei; Gu Jun	Women's doubles	Bye	Lee H-j (KOR); Yim (KOR); W 15–3, 15–5	Tantri (INA); Tuwankotta (INA); W 15–3, 15–5	Gao L (CHN); Qin Y (CHN); W 15–7, 15–12	Huang Ny (CHN); Yang Wei (CHN); W 15–5, 15–5	1st place, gold medalist(s)
Huang Nanyan; Yang Wei	Women's doubles	Bye	Ekmongkolpaisarn (THA); Thungthongkam (THA); W 15–1, 15–4	Jonathans (NED) van Hooren (NED); W 15–10, 15–12	Chung J-h (KOR); Ra (KOR); W 15–6, 15–11	Ge F (CHN); Gu J (CHN); L 5–15, 5–15	2nd place, silver medalist(s)

=== Mixed doubles ===
Athlete	Event	Round of 32	Round of 16	Quarterfinal	Semifinal	Final / BM	
Athlete	Event	Opposition Score	Opposition Score	Opposition Score	Opposition Score	Opposition Score	Rank
Chen Lin; Chen Qiqiu	Mixed doubles	Lucas (AUS); Suryana (AUS); W 15–0, 15–3	Resiana (INA); Suprianto (INA); L 10–15, 3–15	did not advance			
Ge Fei; Liu Yong	Mixed doubles	Bye	Bruil (NED) van den Heuvel (NED); L 15–17, 7–15	did not advance			
Zhang Jun; Gao Ling	Mixed doubles	Siegemund (GER); Neumann (GER); W 10–15, 15–7, 15–10	Bergström (SWE); Karlsson (SWE); W 15–6, 15–7	Kim D-m (KOR); Ra (KOR); W 15–11, 15–1	Søgaard (DEN); R Olsen (DEN); W 10–15, 15–6, 17–16	Haryanto (INA); Timur (INA); W 1–15, 15–13, 15–11	1st place, gold medalist(s)

== Basketball ==
=== Men's ===
Team roster

- Guo Shiqiang
- Hu Weidong
- Li Nan
- Li Qun
- Li Xiaoyong
- Liu Yudong
- Mengke Bateer
- Sun Jun
- Wang Zhizhi
- Yao Ming
- Zhang Jingsong
- Zheng Wu

==== Results ====
Group A Summary

Team	P	W	L	PF	PA	PD	Pts
United States	5	5	0	505	359	+146	10
Italy	5	3	2	332	349	−17	8
Lithuania	5	3	2	372	339	+33	8
France	5	2	3	372	374	+2	7
China	5	2	3	368	419	−51	7
New Zealand	5	0	5	307	416	−109	5

Preliminary round

17 September 2000
21:30

United States	119–72	China
Scoring by quarter: 60 – 38, 59 – 34
Pts: Allen 21; Rebs: Garnett 8 Asts: Payton 7		Pts: Wang 13; Rebs: Guo 5 Asts: Guo 6

The Dome, Sydney
Attendance: 8,319

19 September 2000
11:30

China	75–60	New Zealand
Scoring by quarter: 40 – 30, 35 – 30
Pts: Wang 19; Rebs: Yao 8 Asts: Hu, Sun 4 each		Pts: Dickel, Marks 13 each Rebs: Marks 9 Asts: Dickel 4

The Dome, Sydney
Attendance: 8.357

21 September 2000
14:30

France	82–70	China
Scoring by quarter: 31 – 36, 51 – 34
Pts: Rigaudeau 29; Rebs: Bilba, Julian 7 each Asts: Sciarra 6		Pts: Yao 14; Rebs: Wang 10; Asts: Guo 4

The Dome, Sydney
Attendance: 8,391

23 September 2000
9:30

China	66–82	Lithuania
Scoring by quarter: 42 – 53, 24 – 29
Pts: Yao 23; Rebs: Yao 7 Asts: Liu 2		Pts: Songaila 19; Rebs: Einikis 10; Asts: Jasikevičius 10

The Dome, Sydney
Attendance: 8,365

25 September 2000
14:30

Italy	76–85	China
Scoring by quarter: 40 – 42, 36 – 43
Pts: Abbio 15; Rebs: Fučka, Galanda 5 each Asts: Abbio, Basile 3 each		Pts: Li N 25; Rebs: Yao 6 Asts: Guo 7

The Dome, Sydney
Attendance: 8,477

9/10th classification match

26 September
16:30

China	64–84	Spain
Scoring by quarter: 26 – 46, 38–38
Pts: Wang 14; Rebs: Yao 6 Asts: Guo 4		Pts: Navarro 19; Rebs: Dueñas 10; Asts: Navarro, López 3 each

The Dome, Sydney
Attendance: 8,395

== Beach volleyball ==
Athlete	Event	Preliminary round	Preliminary elimination	Round of 16	Quarterfinals	Semifinals	Final	
Athlete	Event	Opposition Score	Opposition Score	Opposition Score	Opposition Score	Opposition Score	Opposition Score	Rank
Jia Tian; Zhang Jingkun	Women's	Schmidt – Staub (GER); L 15–17	Fernandez – Larrea (CUB); L 12–15	did not advance				=19
Rong Chi; Xiong Zi	Women's	Pereira – Schuller (POR); L 15 – 12	Galindo – Gaxiola (MEX); W 15–12	Cook – Pottharst (AUS); L 2–15	did not advance			=9

== Boxing ==
Athlete	Event	Round of 32	Round of 16	Quarterfinals	Semifinals	Final	
Athlete	Event	Opposition Result	Opposition Result	Opposition Result	Opposition Result	Opposition Result	Rank
Yang Xiangzhong	Flyweight	Dobrescu (ROM); L 3–12	did not advance				
Mai Kangde	Bantamweight	Agaguloglu (TUR); L 4–12	did not advance				
Abudoureheman	Middleweight	Kakietek (POL); RSC	did not advance				

== Cycling ==
=== Road ===
Cross-country

Athlete	Event	Time	Rank
Ma Yanping	Women's cross-country	+ 1 lap	28

=== Track ===
Sprint

Athlete	Event	Qualification		Round 1	Repechage 1	Round 2	Repechage 2	Quarterfinals	Semifinals	Final	
Athlete	Event	Time Speed (km/h)	Rank	Opposition Time Speed (km/h)	Opposition Time Speed (km/h)	Opposition Time Speed (km/h)	Opposition Time Speed (km/h)	Opposition Time Speed (km/h)	Opposition Time Speed (km/h)	Opposition Time Speed (km/h)	Rank
Wang Yan	Women's sprint	11.650s 61.803 km/h	9 Q	Ferris (AUS); L	Szabolcsi (HUN); Kasslin (FIN); L	—N/a				9–12th place final Freitag (GER); Ramage (NZL); Kasslin (FIN); L	12

Time trial

Athlete	Event	Time	Rank
Jiang Cuihua	Women's time trial	34.768	3rd place, bronze medalist(s)
Wang Yan	Women's time trial	35.013	4

== Diving ==
China won ten medals at the diving competition — five gold medals and five silver medals. Fu Mingxia, who had retired after the 1996 Olympics, came back to win a gold and silver medal and became the first woman to win five Olympic medals.

Men

Athlete	Event	Preliminaries		Semifinals				Final		Total	
Athlete	Event	Points	Rank	Points	Rank	Total	Rank	Points	Rank	Points	Rank
Xiao Hailiang	3m springboard	419.91	4 Q	235.92	2	655.83	5 Q	435.12	4	671.04	4
Xiong Ni	3m springboard	457.38	1 Q	230.40	4	687.78	1 Q	478.32	1	708.72	1st place, gold medalist(s)
Hu Jia	10m platform	485.43	2 Q	206.61	1	692.04	2 Q	506.94	2	713.55	2nd place, silver medalist(s)
Tian Liang	10m platform	503.16	1 Q	201.45	2	704.61	1 Q	523.08	1	724.53	1st place, gold medalist(s)
Xiao Hailiang; Xiong Ni	3m synchronized springboard	—N/a								365.58	1st place, gold medalist(s)
Hu Jia; Tian Liang	10m synchronized platform	—N/a								358.74	2nd place, silver medalist(s)

Women

Athlete	Event	Preliminaries		Semifinals				Final		Total	
Athlete	Event	Points	Rank	Points	Rank	Total	Rank	Points	Rank	Total	Rank
Fu Mingxia	3m springboard	342.75	1 Q	242.82	2	585.57	1 Q	366.60	1	609.42	1st place, gold medalist(s)
Guo Jingjing	3m springboard	332.67	2 Q	251.22	1	583.89	2 Q	346.59	2	597.81	2nd place, silver medalist(s)
Li Na	10m platform	366.66	2 Q	196.23	1	562.89	2 Q	345.78	3	542.01	2nd place, silver medalist(s)
Sang Xue	10m platform	374.79	1 Q	196.11	2	570.90	1 Q	316.92	6	513.03	4
Fu Mingxia; Guo Jingjing	Synchronized 3m springboard	—N/a								321.60	2nd place, silver medalist(s)
Li Na; Sang Xue	Synchronized 10m platform	—N/a								345.12	1st place, gold medalist(s)

== Fencing ==
Thirteen fencers, six men and seven women, represented China in 2000.

Men

Athlete	Event	Round of 64	Round of 32	Round of 16	Quarterfinal	Semifinal	Final / BM	
Athlete	Event	Opposition Score	Opposition Score	Opposition Score	Opposition Score	Opposition Score	Opposition Score	Rank
Wang Weixin	Men's épée	Loit (EST); L 7–15	did not advance					
Zhao Gang	Men's épée	El-Din (EGY); W 15–12	Kayser (AUT); W 15–12	Fekete (HUN); W 9–8	Fischer (SUI); L 10–15	did not advance		
Dong Zhaozhi	Men's foil	Bye	Ye C (CHN); L 6–15	did not advance				
Wang Haibin	Men's foil	McMahon (AUS); W 15–6	Sanzo (ITA); L 10–15	did not advance				
Ye Chong	Men's foil	Bye	Dong (CHN); W 15–6	Marsi (HUN); L 8–15	did not advance			
Zhao Chunsheng	Men's sabre	Spencer-El (USA); W 15–10	Pozdnyakov (RUS); L 11–15	did not advance				
Wang Weixin; Zhao Chunsheng; Zhao Gang	Men's team épée	—N/a		Australia; L 38–45	did not advance			
Dong Zhaozhi; Wang Haibin; Ye Chong	Men's team foil	—N/a			Russia; W 45–30	Italy; W 45–32	France; L 44–45	2nd place, silver medalist(s)

Women

Athlete	Event	Round of 64	Round of 32	Round of 16	Quarterfinal	Semifinal	Final / BM	
Athlete	Event	Opposition Score	Opposition Score	Opposition Score	Opposition Score	Opposition Score	Opposition Score	Rank
Li Na	Women's épée	Moustafa (EGY); W 15–5	Duplitzer (GER); L 15–3	did not advance				
Liang Qin	Women's épée	Bye	Zalaffi (ITA); L 11–15	did not advance				
Yang Shaoqi	Women's épée	Bye	Nagy (HUN); L 8–11	did not advance				
Meng Jie	Women's foil	Bye	Rybicka (POL); W 15–9	Badea-Cârlescu (ROU); L 7–15	did not advance			
Xiao Aihua	Women's foil	Bye	Carbone (ARG); W 15–8	Mroczkiewicz (POL); W 15–13	Trillini (ITA); L 8–9	did not advance		
Yuan Li	Women's foil	Sevostiyanova (KAZ); W 15–3	Bianchedi (ITA); L 7–15	did not advance				
Li Na; Liang Qin; Yang Shaoqi	Women's team épée	—N/a			France; W 45–42	Switzerland; L 33–45	Hungary; W 41–39	3rd place, bronze medalist(s)
Meng Jie; Xiao Aihua; Yuan Li; Zhang Lei	Women's team foil	—N/a		Poland; L 43–45	did not advance			

== Football ==
The Chinese women's team finished fifth overall in the competition.

=== Women's tournament ===
Team roster

- Bai Jie
- Fan Yunjie
- Gao Hong
- Jin Yan
- Liu Ailing
- Liu Ying
- Pu Wei
- Sun Wen – Top scorer (4 goals)
- Wang Liping
- Wen Lirong
- Xie Huilin
- Zhang Ouying
- Zhao Lihong

Group stage

Team	Pld	W	D	L	GF	GA	GD	Pts
United States	3	2	1	0	6	2	+4	7
Norway	3	2	0	1	5	4	+1	6
China	3	1	1	1	5	4	+1	4
Nigeria	3	0	0	3	3	9	−6	0

14 September 2000
17:30

China	3–1	Nigeria
Zhao 12'; Sun 57', 83'	Report	Nkwocha 85' (pen.)

Bruce Stadium, Canberra
Attendance: 16,000
Referee: Martha Toro (Colombia)

17 September 2000
17:30

United States	1–1	China
Foudy 38'	Report	Sun 67'

Melbourne Cricket Ground, Melbourne
Attendance: 32,500
Referee: Nicole Petignat (Switzerland)

20 September 2000
17:30

Norway	2–1	China
Pettersen 55'; Haugenes 78'	Report	Sun 75' (pen.)

Bruce Stadium, Canberra
Attendance: 11,532
Referee: Sonia Denoncourt (Canada)

== Gymnastics ==
=== Men's artistic ===
Team

Athlete	Event	Qualification								Final							
Athlete	Event	Apparatus						Total	Rank	Apparatus						Total	Rank
Athlete	Event	F	PH	R	V	PB	HB	Total	Rank	F	PH	R	V	PB	HB	Total	Rank
Huang Xu	Team	—N/a	9.687	9.012	—N/a	9.675	9.625	37.999	68	—N/a	9.712	9.650	—N/a	9.737	9.275	—N/a	
Li Xiaopeng	Team	9.725	—N/a	9.600	9.224	9.762	9.650	47.962	54	9.687	—N/a	9.550	9.712	9.775	9.675	—N/a	
Xiao Junfeng	Team	9.475	9.675	9.350	9.212	—N/a		37.712	70	—N/a	8.387	6.825	9.562	—N/a		—N/a	
Xing Aowei	Team	9.500	9.725	—N/a	9.237	9.575	9.537	47.574	55	9.587	9.750	—N/a	9.487	9.700	9.737	—N/a	
Yang Wei	Team	9.612 Q	9.687	9.650 Q	9.675	9.225	9.600	57.449	5 Q	9.575	9.687	9.687	9.700	9.637	9.762	—N/a	
Zheng Lihui	Team	9.587	9.675	9.575	9.512	9.550	9.412	57.311	8 Q	9.675	9.725	9.600	9.600	9.337	9.437	—N/a	
Total	Team	38.424	38.774	38.175	37.649	38.562	38.412	229.996	2 Q	38.524	38.884	38.487	38.574	38.849	38.611	231.919	1st place, gold medalist(s)

Individual events

Athlete	Event	Apparatus						Total	Rank
Athlete	Event	F	PH	R	V	PB	HB	Total	Rank
Yang Wei	All-around	9.700	9.750	9.712	9.712	9.750	9.737	58.361	2nd place, silver medalist(s)
Zheng Lihui	All-around	9.612	9.650	9.575	9.612	9.675	9.350	57.474	9
Li Xiaopeng	Floor	9.737	—N/a					9.737	5
Yang Wei	Floor	9.750	—N/a					9.750	4
Yang Wei	Rings	—N/a		9.712	—N/a			9.712	4
Huang Xu	Parallel bars	—N/a				9.650	—N/a	9.650	7
Li Xiaopeng	Parallel bars	—N/a				9.825	—N/a	9.825	1st place, gold medalist(s)

=== Women's artistic ===
Team

The Chinese women's gymnastics team won the bronze medal but their medals were stripped ten years later, in 2010, due to Dong Fangxiao's age at the time of the competition. Their bronze medals were awarded to the United States' team.

Individual events

Athlete	Event	Apparatus				Total	Rank
Athlete	Event	V	UB	BB	F	Total	Rank
Dong Fangxiao	All-around	Disqualified					
Liu Xuan	All-around	9.331	9.725	9.750	9.612	38.418	3rd place, bronze medalist(s)
Yang Yun	All-around	9.531	9.787	9.287	9.700	38.305	5
Yang Yun	Floor	—N/a			9.637	9.637	5
Ling Jie	Uneven bars	—N/a	9.837	—N/a		9.837	2nd place, silver medalist(s)
Yang Yun	Uneven bars	—N/a	9.787	—N/a		9.787	3rd place, bronze medalist(s)
Ling Jie	Balance beam	—N/a		9.675	—N/a	9.675	7
Liu Xuan	Balance beam	—N/a		9.825	—N/a	9.825	1st place, gold medalist(s)

== Hockey ==
=== Women's team competition ===
Team roster

- Cai Xuemei
- Chen Zhaoxia
- Cheng Hui
- Hou Xiaolan
- Huang Junxia
- Liu Lijie
- Long Fengyu
- Nie Yali
- Shen Lihong
- Tang Chunling
- Wang Jiuyan
- Yang Hongbing
- Yang Huiping
- Yu Yali
- Zhou Wanfeng

Summary

Qualified to quarterfinals

Team	Pld	W	D	L	GF	GA	Pts
New Zealand	4	2	1	1	7	5	7
China	4	2	0	2	4	5	6
Netherlands	4	1	2	1	9	9	5
Germany	4	1	2	1	6	6	5
South Africa	4	1	1	2	4	5	1

Key:
- FT – After full time.
- P – Match decided by penalty-shootout.

Team	Event	Group Stage					Quarterfinal	Semifinal	Final / BM	
Team	Event	Opposition Score	Opposition Score	Opposition Score	Opposition Score	Rank	Opposition Score	Opposition Score	Opposition Score	Rank
China women's	Women's tournament	Netherlands; W 2–1	New Zealand; L 0–2	Germany; W 2–1	South Africa; L 0–1	2 Q	Spain; D 0–0	Argentina; L 1–2	New Zealand; L 1–5	5

== Judo ==
Men

Athlete	Event	Round of 32	Round of 16	Quarterfinals	Semifinals	Repechage 1	Repechage 2	Repechage 3	Final / BM	
Athlete	Event	Opposition Result	Opposition Result	Opposition Result	Opposition Result	Opposition Result	Opposition Result	Opposition Result	Opposition Result	Rank
Jia Yunbing	60kg	Nomura (JPN); L 0000–1000	—N/a			Greczkowski (USA); L 0001–1000	did not advance			
Zhang Guangjun	66kg	Bivol (MDA); W 1000-0000	Collett (AUS); W 1000-0000	Özkan (TUR); L 0000-1000	—N/a		Miresmaeili (IRI); L 0001-1001	did not advance		
Xu Zhiming	90kg	Odkhüü (MGL); W 1000-0001	Raphael (MRI); L 0000-1100	did not advance						
Song Qitao	100kg	El Gharbawy (EGY); L 0000-1000	did not advance							
Pan Song	+100kg	Bat-Erdene (MGL); W 1010-0000	Baccino (ARG); W 1010-0010	Tmenov (RUS); L 1111-0000	—N/a		van der Geest (NED); W 0100-0011	Sharapov (BLR); L 0011-0100	did not advance	

Women

Athlete	Event	Round of 32	Round of 16	Quarterfinals	Semifinals	Repechage 1	Repechage 2	Repechage 3	Final / BM	
Athlete	Event	Opposition Result	Opposition Result	Opposition Result	Opposition Result	Opposition Result	Opposition Result	Opposition Result	Opposition Result	Rank
Zhao Shunxin	48kg	Tallie (RSA); W	Tamura (JPN); L	Bye			Lusnikova (UKR); W	Nichollo-Rosso (FRA); W	Gradante (GER); L	5
Liu Yuxiang	52kg	Bye	Aluaș (ROU); W	Brojeshori Devi (IND); W	Narazaki (JPN); L	—N/a			Gravenstijn (NED); W	3rd place, bronze medalist(s)
Shen Jun	57kg	Bye	Ferreira (BRA); W	Cavazzuti (ITA); W	Gonzalez (CUB); L	—N/a			Kusakabe (JPN); L	5
Li Shufang	63kg	Bye	Artamonova (KGZ); W	Vandecavaye (BEL); W	Gal (ITA); W	—N/a			Vandenhende (FRA); L	2nd place, silver medalist(s)
Qin Dongya	70kg	Traki (TUN); L	did not advance							
Tang Lin	78kg	Salaeva (TKM); W	Dashdulam (MGL); W	Silva (BRA); W	Rakels (BEL); W	—N/a			Lebrun (FRA); W	1st place, gold medalist(s)
Yuan Hua	+78kg	Bye	Iredale (NZL); W	Marques (BRA); W	Köppen (GER); W	—N/a			Beltran (CUB); W	1st place, gold medalist(s)

== Modern pentathlon ==
Athlete	Event	Shooting (10 m air pistol)			Fencing (épée one touch)			Swimming (200 m freestyle)			Riding (show jumping)			Running (3000 m)			Total points	Final rank
Athlete	Event	Points	Rank	MP Points	Results	Rank	MP points	Time	Rank	MP points	Penalties	Rank	MP points	Time	Rank	MP Points	Total points	Final rank
Qian Zhenhua	Men's	179	9	884	11–13	15	800	2:05.05	5	1250	DNF	21	0	10:24.99	23	902	3836	24
Wang Jinlin	Women's	174	13	1024	10–14	19	760	2:29.51	22	1105	321	21	779	12:04.76	19	822	4490	20

== Rowing ==
Athlete	Event	Heats		Repechage		Semifinals		Final	
Athlete	Event	Time	Rank	Time	Rank	Time	Rank	Time	Rank
Hua Lingjun; Liang Hongming	Men's double sculls	6:50.94	15 R	6:43.64	12 FC	—N/a		6:36.97	15
Hua Lingjun; Li Yang; Liang Hongming; Liu Jian	Men's quadruple sculls	6:16.48	13 R	6:16.80	4	did not advance			
Liu Lin; Sun Guangxia	Women's double sculls	7:33.17	10 R	7:32.36	8 FB	—N/a		7:23.74	10
Ou Shaoyan; Yu Hua	Women's lightweight double sculls	7:21.55	9 R	7:21.00	8 SA/B	7:18.60	10 FB	7:15.31	10
Han Jing; Liu Lijuan; Liu Lin; Sun Guangxia	Women's quadruple sculls	6:49.84	8 R	6:52.47	7 FB	—N/a		6:39.51	8

== Sailing ==
One man and three women competed for the People's Republic of China in the sailing competition at the 2000 Olympics, in three events.

Men's Mistral

- Zhou Yuanguo
  1. Race 1 – (37) OCS
  2. Race 2 – 6
  3. Race 3 – 23
  4. Race 4 – (37) DSQ
  5. Race 5 – 18
  6. Race 6 – 2
  7. Race 7 – 3
  8. Race 8 – 2
  9. Race 9 – 1
  10. Race 10 – 1
  11. Race 11 – 8
  12. Final – 64 (5th place)

Women's Mistral

- Zhang Chujun
  1. Race 1 – 10
  2. Race 2 – (17)
  3. Race 3 – 8
  4. Race 4 – (11)
  5. Race 5 – 6
  6. Race 6 – 3
  7. Race 7 – 5
  8. Race 8 – 5
  9. Race 9 – 8
  10. Race 10 – 8
  11. Race 11 – 7
  12. Final – 60 (7th place)

Women's Double Handed Dinghy (470)

- Yang Xiaoyan and Li Dongying
  1. Race 1 – (19)
  2. Race 2 – 14
  3. Race 3 – (19)
  4. Race 4 – 18
  5. Race 5 – 11
  6. Race 6 – 16
  7. Race 7 – 18
  8. Race 8 – 18
  9. Race 9 – 16
  10. Race 10 – 17
  11. Race 11 – 12
  12. Final – 140 (19th place)

== Softball ==
=== Women's team competition ===
- Team Roster
  - Wei Qiang
  - Tao Hua
  - Deng Xiaoling
  - Mu Xia
  - Xu Jian
  - Zhang Chunfang
  - Yan Fang
  - Wang Ying
  - An Zhongxin
  - Wang Lihong
  - Yu Yanhong
  - Zhou Yan
  - Qiu Haitao
  - Zhang Yanqing
  - Qin Xuejing

== Swimming ==
=== Men ===
Athlete	Event	Heat		Semifinal		Final	
Athlete	Event	Time	Rank	Time	Rank	Time	Rank
Jiang Chengji	50m freestyle	22.82	17	did not advance			
Jin Hao	400m freestyle	3:57.22	25	did not advance			
Jin Hao	1500m freestyle	15:48.49	32	did not advance			
Ouyang Kunpeng	100m backstroke	57.47	34	did not advance			
Fu Yong	200m backstroke	2:02.70	26	did not advance			
Zhu Yi	100m breaststroke	1:03.20	29	did not advance			
Zhu Yi	200m breaststroke	2:21.60	38	did not advance			
Ouyang Kunpeng	100m butterfly	54.12	20	did not advance			
Xie Xufeng	200m butterfly	2:02.00	33	did not advance			
Xie Xufeng	200m individual medley	2:04.67	25	did not advance			
Xie Xufeng	400m individual medley	4:23.33	21	did not advance			
Jin Hao	400m individual medley	4:24.56	25	did not advance			
Fu Yong; Ouyang Kunpeng; Xie Xufeng; Zhu Yi	4 × 100 m medley relay	3:47.37	21	did not advance			

Women

Athlete	Event	Heat		Semifinal		Final	
Athlete	Event	Time	Rank	Time	Rank	Time	Rank
Han Xue	50m freestyle	26.01	21	did not advance			
Han Xue	100m freestyle	56.79	19	did not advance			
Wang Luna	200m freestyle	2:00.89	12 Q	1:59.97	8 Q	1:59.55	8
Yang Yu	200m freestyle	2:01.34	17	did not advance			
Chen Hua	400m freestyle	4:10.56	5 Q	—N/a		4:13.11	8
Chen Hua	800m freestyle	8:33.23	8 Q	—N/a		8:30.58	6
Lu Donghua	100m backstroke	1:02.91	15 Q	1:03.31	16	did not advance	
Zhan Shu	100m backstroke	1:02.19	7 Q	1:02.92	14	did not advance	
Zhan Shu	200m backstroke	2:15.97	18	did not advance			
Li Wei	100m breaststroke	1:10.55	19	did not advance			
Qi Hui	100m breaststroke	1:09.88	13 Q	1:09.81	12	did not advance	
Luo Xuejuan	200m breaststroke	2:28.43	13 Q	2:25.86	6 Q	2:27.33	8
Qi Hui	200m breaststroke	2:26.76	3 Q	2:24.21	2 Q	2:25.36	4
Liu Limin	100m butterfly	59.98	18	did not advance			
Ruan Yi	100m butterfly	1:01.16	25	did not advance			
Liu Limin	200m butterfly	2:12.32	19	did not advance			
Liu Yin	200m butterfly	2:12.79	21	did not advance			
Chen Yan	200m individual medley	2:16.01	9 Q	2:15.27	9	did not advance	
Zhan Shu	200m individual medley	2:16.63	13 Q	2:16.58	13	did not advance	
Chen Yan	400m individual medley	4:45.65	11	did not advance			
Liu Yin	400m individual medley	4:50.33	19	did not advance			
Han Xue; Li Jin; Sun Dan; Yang Yu	4 × 100 m freestyle relay	3:46.62	9	did not advance			
Chen Yan; Sun Dan; Wang Luna; Yang Yu	4 × 200 m freestyle relay	8:07.69	9	did not advance			
Han Xue; Liu Limin; Qi Hui; Zhan Shu	4 × 100 m medley relay	4:08.27	7 Q	—N/a		4:07.83	8

== Synchronized swimming ==
Athlete	Event	Technical routine		Qualification			Final		
Athlete	Event	Points	Rank	Points	Total (technical + free)	Rank	Points	Total (technical + free)	Rank
Li Min; Li Yuanyuan	Duet	33.250	7	61.620	94.870	7 Q	33.250	94.784	7
Hou Yingli; Jin Na; Li Min; Li Rouping; Li Yuanyuan; Wang Fang; Xia Ye; Zhang Xiaohuan	Team	—N/a					33.017	94.593	7

== Table tennis ==
Men

Athlete	Event	Group stage		Round of 32	Round of 16	Quarterfinals	Semifinals	Final / BM	
Athlete	Event	Opposition Result	Opposition Result	Opposition Result	Opposition Result	Opposition Result	Opposition Result	Opposition Result	Rank
Kong Linghui	Singles	Bye		Huang (CAN); W 3–0	Błaszczyk (POL); W 3–2	Schlager (AUT); W 3–2	Persson (SWE); W 3–1	Waldner (SWE); W 3–2	1st place, gold medalist(s)
Liu Guoliang	Singles	Bye		Keen (NED); W 3–0	Eloi (FRA); W 3–2	Roßkopf (GER); W 3–0	Waldner (SWE); L 0–3	Persson (SWE); W 3–1	3rd place, bronze medalist(s)
Liu Guozheng	Singles	Bye		Saive (BEL); W 3–2	Chiang (TPE); W 3–0	Persson (SWE); L 1–3	did not advance		
Kong Linghui; Liu Guoliang	Doubles	—N/a			Błaszczyk (POL); Krzeszewski (POL); W 3–2	Kim T-S (KOR); Oh S-E (KOR); W 3–1	Chila (FRA); Gatien (FRA); W 3–1	Wang L (CHN); Yan (CHN); L 1–3	2nd place, silver medalist(s)
Wang Liqin; Yan Sen	Doubles	—N/a			Iseki (JPN); Tasaki (JPN); W 3–0	Eloi (FRA); Legout (FRA); W 3–0	Lee C-S (KOR); Ryu S-M (KOR); W 3–1	Kong (CHN); Liu Gl (CHN); W 3–1	1st place, gold medalist(s)

Women

Athlete	Event	Group stage		Round of 32	Round of 16	Quarterfinals	Semifinals	Final / BM	
Athlete	Event	Opposition Result	Opposition Result	Opposition Result	Opposition Result	Opposition Result	Opposition Result	Opposition Result	Rank
Li Ju	Singles	Bye		Melnik (RUS); W 3–2	Ni (LUX); W 3–0	Ryu J-H (KOR); W 3–1	Jing (SIN); W 3–1	Wang N (CHN); L 2–3	2nd place, silver medalist(s)
Sun Jin	Singles	Bye		Jing (SIN); L 0–3	did not advance				
Wang Nan	Singles	Bye		Li C (NZL); W 3–0	Li Jia (SIN); W 3–2	Koyama (JPN); W 3–0	Chen J (TPE); W 3–1	Li Ju (CHN); W 3–2	1st place, gold medalist(s)
Li Ju; Wang Nan	Doubles	—N/a			Schall (GER); Struse (GER); W 3–0	Bentsen (CRO); Boroš (CRO); W 3–1	Kim M-K (KOR); Ryu J-H (KOR); W 3–2	Sun J (CHN); Yang Y (CHN); W 3–0	1st place, gold medalist(s)
Sun Jin; Yang Ying	Doubles	—N/a			Paškauskienė (LTU); Prūsienė (LTU); W 3–0	Miao (AUS); S Zhou (AUS); W 3–0	Bátorfi (HUN); Tóth (HUN); W 3–1	Li Ju (CHN); Wang Nan (CHN); L 0–3	2nd place, silver medalist(s)

== Taekwondo ==
Athlete	Event	Round of 16	Quarterfinals	Semifinals	Repechage 1	Repechage 2	Final / BM	
Athlete	Event	Opposition Result	Opposition Result	Opposition Result	Opposition Result	Opposition Result	Opposition Result	Rank
Zhu Feng	Men's +80kg	Castro (COL); L 5–6	did not advance					
He Lumin	Women's 67kg	Bye	Stevenson (GBR); L 5–6	did not advance				
Chen Zhong	Women's +67kg	White (AUS); W 6–0	Bourguigue (MAR); W 5–3	Carmona (VEN); W 8–6	—N/a		Ivanova (RUS); W 8–3	1st place, gold medalist(s)

== Tennis ==
Athlete	Event	Round of 64	Round of 32	Round of 16	Quarterfinals	Semifinals	Final / BM	
Athlete	Event	Opposition Score	Opposition Score	Opposition Score	Opposition Score	Opposition Score	Opposition Score	Rank
Li Na	Women's singles	Sánchez Vicario (ESP); L 1–6, 5–7	did not advance					
Yi Jing-Qian	Women's singles	Bedáňová (CZE); L 2–6, 7–6, 3–6	did not advance					
Li Na; Li Ting	Women's doubles	—N/a	Cortez (BRA) / Menga (BRA); L 4–6, 2–6	did not advance				

== Triathlon ==
At the inaugural Olympic triathlon competition, China was represented by two women.

Athlete	Event	Swim (1.5 km)	Bike (40 km)	Run (10 km)	Total Time	Rank
Shi Meng	Women's	20:26.18	1:12:42.23	43:32.32	2:16:40.73	40
Wang Dan	Women's	20:50.78	1:08:52.20	39:06.12	2:08:49.10	32

== Volleyball ==
=== Women's ===
Team roster

- Chen Jing
- Gui Chaoran
- He Qi
- Li Shan
- Li Yan
- Qiu Aihua
- Sun Yue
- Wang Lina
- Wu Dan
- Wu Yongmei
- Yin Yin
- Zhu Yunying

Head coach: Hu Jin

Pool A Summary

Pos	Team	Pld	W	L	Pts	SW	SL	SR	SPW	SPL	SPR	Qualification
1	Brazil	5	5	0	10	15	1	15.000	395	272	1.452	Quarterfinals
2	United States	5	4	1	9	13	4	3.250	392	306	1.281	Quarterfinals
3	Croatia	5	3	2	8	9	9	1.000	411	389	1.057	Quarterfinals
4	China	5	2	3	7	8	9	0.889	371	365	1.016	Quarterfinals
5	Australia	5	1	4	6	4	13	0.308	303	408	0.743	
6	Kenya	5	0	5	5	2	15	0.133	280	412	0.680	

Results

16 September 2000; 21:10	China	1–3	United States	Sydney Entertainment Centre
16 September 2000; 21:10	(25–19, 21–25, 12–25, 24–26)			Sydney Entertainment Centre

18 September 2000; 12:00	Croatia	0–3	China	Sydney Showground Pavilion 4
18 September 2000; 12:00	(25–23, 26–28, 25–20, 25–15)			Sydney Showground Pavilion 4

20 September 2000; 18:30	China	0–3	Brazil	Sydney Entertainment Centre
20 September 2000; 18:30	(14–25, 21–25, 18–25)			Sydney Entertainment Centre

22 September 2000; 10:00	Kenya	0–3	China	Sydney Showground Pavilion 4
22 September 2000; 10:00	(15–25, 14–25, 18–25)			Sydney Showground Pavilion 4

24 September 2000; 18:30	China	3–0	Australia	Sydney Entertainment Centre
24 September 2000; 18:30	(25–18, 25–14, 25–15)			Sydney Entertainment Centre

Quarterfinals

26 September 2000; 14:30	China	0–3	Russia	Sydney Entertainment Centre
26 September 2000; 14:30	(25–27, 23–25, 25–27)			Sydney Entertainment Centre

5–8th place classification semifinals

27 September 2000; 12:20	South Korea	1–3	China	Sydney Entertainment Centre
27 September 2000; 12:20	(25–23, 19–25, 23–25, 19–25)			Sydney Entertainment Centre

5/6th classification match

0000-00-00; 00:00	China	3–1	Germany	Sydney Entertainment Centre
0000-00-00; 00:00	(25–19, 25–19, 22–25, 25–18)			Sydney Entertainment Centre

== Weightlifting ==
Men

Athlete	Event	Snatch			Clean & Jerk			Total	Rank
Athlete	Event	1	2	3	1	2	3	Total	Rank
Wu Wenxiong	– 56 kg	125.0	~~130.0~~	~~130.0~~	157.5	~~162.5~~	162.5	287.5	2nd place, silver medalist(s)
Zhang Xiangxiang	– 56 kg	125.0	~~130.0~~	~~130.0~~	~~157.5~~	157.5	162.5	287.5	3rd place, bronze medalist(s)
Le Maosheng	– 62 kg	140.0	~~145.0~~	~~145.0~~	175.0	~~177.5~~	~~177.5~~	315.0	4
Zhang Guozheng	– 69 kg	~~150.0~~	150.0	152.5	~~185.0~~	185.0	~~190.0~~	337.5	4
Wan Jianhui	– 69 kg	~~147.5~~	147.5	~~150.0~~	~~180.0~~	~~180.0~~	~~180.0~~	DNF	—
Zhan Xugang	– 77 kg	160.0	~~165.0~~	~~165.0~~	202.5	207.5	—	367.5	1st place, gold medalist(s)

Women

Athlete	Event	Snatch			Clean & Jerk			Total	Rank
Athlete	Event	1	2	3	1	2	3	Total	Rank
Yang Xia	– 53 kg	95.0	97.5	100.0	122.5	~~125.0~~	—	225.0	1st place, gold medalist(s)
Chen Xiaomin	– 63 kg	105.0	110.0	112.5	130.0	~~135.0~~	—	242.5	1st place, gold medalist(s)
Lin Weining	– 69 kg	107.5	110.0	~~112.5~~	132.5	~~137.5~~	~~145.0~~	242.5	1st place, gold medalist(s)
Ding Meiyuan	+ 75 kg	130.0	~~135.0~~	135.0	157.5	162.5	165.0	300.0	1st place, gold medalist(s)

== Wrestling ==
Freestyle

Athlete	Event	Elimination Pool			Quarterfinal	Semifinal	Final / BM	
Athlete	Event	Opposition Result	Opposition Result	Rank	Opposition Result	Opposition Result	Opposition Result	Rank
Chen Xingqiang	130kg	Medvedev (BLR); L 0–3	Kovalevsky (KGZ); L 2–4	3	did not advance			

Greco-Roman

Athlete	Event	Elimination Pool			Quarterfinal	Semifinal	Final / BM	
Athlete	Event	Opposition Result	Opposition Result	Rank	Opposition Result	Opposition Result	Opposition Result	Rank
Wang Hui	54kg	Rangraz (IRI); W 8–2	Švehla (CZE); W 8–3	1	Kang (PRK); L 5–10	—N/a	5th place match Ter-Mkrtychyan (GER); L 0–6	6
Sheng Zetian	58kg	Ainaoui (FRA); W 1–0	Stepanyan (UKR); W 10–0	1	Gruenwald (USA); W 11–1	Kim I-s (KOR); L 0–4	Yıldız (GER); W 2–0	3rd place, bronze medalist(s)
Yi Shanjun	63kg	Chachua (GEO); L 0–11	Galstyan (ARM); L 2–2	3	did not advance			
Zhao Hailin	130kg	Milian (CUB); L 0–1	Hallik (EST); W 3–2	2	did not advance			

== See also ==
- China at the Olympics
- China at the 2000 Summer Paralympics

== Additional resources ==
- Wallechinsky, David (2004). The Complete Book of the Summer Olympics (Athens 2004 Edition). Toronto, Canada. ISBN 1-894963-32-6.
- International Olympic Committee (2001). The Results. Retrieved 12 November 2005.
- Sydney Organising Committee for the Olympic Games (2001). Official Report of the XXVII Olympiad Volume 1: Preparing for the Games. Retrieved 20 November 2005.
- Sydney Organising Committee for the Olympic Games (2001). Official Report of the XXVII Olympiad Volume 2: Celebrating the Games. Retrieved 20 November 2005.
- Sydney Organising Committee for the Olympic Games (2001). The Results. Retrieved 20 November 2005.
- International Olympic Committee Web Site
