= Diving at the 2000 Summer Olympics – Men's synchronized 3 metre springboard =

Men's synchronized 3 metre springboard at the Games of the XXVII Olympiad

Medalists
1st place, gold medalist(s)		Xiong Ni, Xiao Hailiang	China
2nd place, silver medalist(s)		Dmitri Sautin, Alexandre Dobroskok	Russia
3rd place, bronze medalist(s)		Robert Newbery, Dean Pullar	Australia

The men's synchronized 3 metre springboard was one of eight diving events included in the Diving at the 2000 Summer Olympics programme and one of the newest four events since 1924.

The competition was held as a direct final:

Final
28 September — Each pair of divers performed five dives freely chosen from the five diving groups, with two dives limited to a 2.0 degree of difficulty and the others without limitation. Divers could perform different dives during the same dive if both presented the same difficulty degree. The final ranking was determined by the score attained by the pair after all five dives had been performed.

== Results ==
Rank	Nation	Dives					Total
Rank	Nation	1	2	3	4	5	Total
1st place, gold medalist(s)	China; Xiong Ni; Xiao Hailiang	55.80	54.00	79.98	86.70	89.10	365.58
2nd place, silver medalist(s)	Russia; Dmitri Sautin; Alexandre Dobroskok	52.20	52.20	70.68	69.75	85.14	329.97
3rd place, bronze medalist(s)	Australia; Robert Newbery; Dean Pullar	48.60	49.20	64.17	84.66	76.23	322.86
4	United States; Troy Dumais; David Pichler	48.00	46.20	72.00	77.19	77.52	320.91
5	Mexico; Fernando Platas; Eduardo Rueda	51.60	49.20	72.00	71.10	73.80	317.70
6	France; Gilles Emptoz-Lacote; Fréderic Piérre	49.20	47.40	68.04	65.25	80.19	310.08
7	Great Britain; Tony Ally; Mark Shipman	46.20	46.80	63.24	73.80	66.60	296.64
8	Italy; Nicola Marconi; Donald Miranda	47.40	49.80	72.00	59.52	57.66	286.38

== Sources ==
- Sydney Organising Committee for the Olympic Games (SOCOG) (2001). Official Report of the XXVII Olympiad - Volume Three: Results (Diving) (pdf) (in English and French). Sydney, New South Wales: Sydney Organising Committee for the Olympic Games (SOCOG). pp. 54–7. ISBN 0-9579616-1-8. OCLC 49687523.
