= Diving at the 2000 Summer Olympics – Women's synchronized 10 metre platform =

Women's synchronized 10 metre platform at the Games of the XXVII Olympiad

Medalists
1st place, gold medalist(s)		Na Li, Sang Xue	China
2nd place, silver medalist(s)		Émilie Heymans, Anne Montminy	Canada
3rd place, bronze medalist(s)		Rebecca Gilmore, Loudy Tourky	Australia

The women's synchronized 10 metre platform was one of eight diving events included in the Diving at the 2000 Summer Olympics programme and one of the four new events added for the 2000 games since a change was made in 1924.

The competition was held as an outright final:

Final
28 September — Each pair of divers performed five dives freely chosen from the five diving groups, with two dives limited to a 2.0 degree of difficulty and the others without limitation. Divers could perform different dives during the same dive if both presented the same difficulty degree. The final ranking was determined by the score attained by the pair after all five dives had been performed.

== Results ==
- Values in brackets represent the aggregate score and ranking at the end of the dive.

Rank	Divers	NOC	Dive 1		Dive 2		Dive 3		Dive 4		Dive 5		
Rank	Divers	NOC	Points	Rank	Points	Rank	Points	Rank	Points	Rank	Points	Rank	Total
1	Na Li and Sang Xue	China	55.80	1	58.20 (114.00)	1 (1)	78.12 (192.12)	1 (1)	81.00 (273.12)	1 (1)	72.00	3	345.12
2	Émilie Heymans and Anne Montminy	Canada	53.40	2	47.40 (100.80)	6 (6)	65.25 (166.05)	3 (3)	71.28 (237.33)	2 (2)	74.70	1	312.03
3	Rebecca Gilmore and Loudy Tourky	Australia	49.20	6	47.40 (96.60)	6 (7)	63.84 (160.44)	4 (6)	66.36 (226.80)	3 (4)	74.70	1	301.50
4	Marion Reiff and Anja Richter-Libiseller	Austria	51.00	3	50.40 (101.40)	5 (5)	61.32 (162.72)	6 (5)	64.68 (227.40)	4 (3)	66.60	5	294.00
5	Jenny Keim and Laura Wilkinson	United States	49.20	6	52.80 (102.00)	2 (3)	69.30 (171.30)	2 (2)	55.44 (226.74)	7 (5)	64.68	7	291.42
6	Evgeniya Olshevskaya and Svetlana Timoshinina	Russia	50.40	4	51.60 (102.00)	4 (3)	61.32 (163.32)	6 (4)	55.68 (219.00)	5 (6)	69.30	4	288.30
7	Odile Arboles-Souchon and Julie Danaux	France	50.40	4	52.20 (102.60)	3 (2)	56.70 (159.30)	8 (7)	55.68 (214.98)	5 (7)	62.16	8	277.14
8	María Alcalá and Azul Almazán	Mexico	42.60	8	46.80 (89.40)	8 (8)	63.84 (153.24)	4 (8)	45.36 (198.60)	8 (8)	65.70	6	264.30

== Sources ==
- Sydney Organising Committee for the Olympic Games (SOCOG) (2001). Official Report of the XXVII Olympiad - Volume Three: Results (Diving) (pdf) (in English and French). Sydney, New South Wales: Sydney Organising Committee for the Olympic Games (SOCOG). pp. 90–2. ISBN 0-9579616-1-8. OCLC 49687523.
