= Uneven bars at the Olympics =

Olympic sport

Uneven bars at the Olympic Games
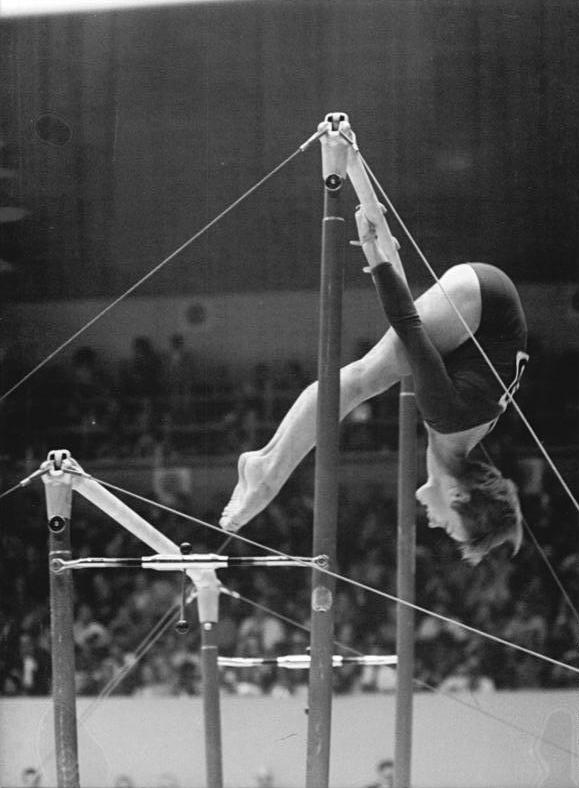
- Karin Janz competing on the uneven bars at the 1968 Summer Olympics

Overview
- Sport: Artistic gymnastics
- Gender: Women
- Years held: 1952 – 2024

Reigning champion
- Women: Kaylia Nemour (ALG)

The uneven bars is an artistic gymnastics event held at the Summer Olympics on which only women compete. Women started competing in and earning medals at apparatus finals in 1952.

== Medalists ==
=== Women ===
Games	Gold	Silver	Bronze
1952 Helsinki	Margit Korondi; Hungary	Maria Gorokhovskaya; Soviet Union	Ágnes Keleti; Hungary
1956 Melbourne	Ágnes Keleti; Hungary	Larisa Latynina; Soviet Union	Sofia Muratova; Soviet Union
1960 Rome	Polina Astakhova; Soviet Union	Larisa Latynina; Soviet Union	Tamara Lyukhina; Soviet Union
1964 Tokyo	Polina Astakhova; Soviet Union	Katalin Makray; Hungary	Larisa Latynina; Soviet Union
1968 Mexico City	Věra Čáslavská; Czechoslovakia	Karin Janz; East Germany	Zinaida Voronina; Soviet Union
1972 Munich	Karin Janz; East Germany	Olga Korbut; Soviet Union Erika Zuchold; East Germany	none awarded
1976 Montreal	Nadia Comăneci; Romania	Teodora Ungureanu; Romania	Marta Egervari; Hungary
1980 Moscow	Maxi Gnauck; East Germany	Emilia Eberle; Romania	Maria Filatova; Soviet Union Steffi Kräker; East Germany Melita Ruhn; Romania
1984 Los Angeles	Ma Yanhong; China Julianne McNamara; United States	none awarded	Mary Lou Retton; United States
1988 Seoul	Daniela Silivaș; Romania	Dagmar Kersten; East Germany	Yelena Shushunova; Soviet Union
1992 Barcelona	Lu Li; China	Tatiana Gutsu; Unified Team	Shannon Miller; United States
1996 Atlanta	Svetlana Khorkina; Russia	Amy Chow; United States Bi Wenjing; China	none awarded
2000 Sydney	Svetlana Khorkina; Russia	Ling Jie; China	Yang Yun; China
2004 Athens	Émilie Le Pennec; France	Terin Humphrey; United States	Courtney Kupets; United States
2008 Beijing	He Kexin; China	Nastia Liukin; United States	Yang Yilin; China
2012 London	Aliya Mustafina; Russia	He Kexin; China	Beth Tweddle; Great Britain
2016 Rio de Janeiro	Aliya Mustafina; Russia	Madison Kocian; United States	Sophie Scheder; Germany
2020 Tokyo	Nina Derwael; Belgium	Anastasia Ilyankova; ROC	Sunisa Lee; United States
2024 Paris	Kaylia Nemour; Algeria	Qiu Qiyuan; China	Sunisa Lee; United States

==== Multiple medalists ====
Rank	Gymnast	Nation	Olympics	Gold	Silver	Bronze	Total
1	Polina Astakhova	Soviet Union	1960–1964	2	0	0	2
1	Svetlana Khorkina	Russia	1996–2000	2	0	0	2
1	Aliya Mustafina	Russia	2012–2016	2	0	0	2
4	He Kexin	China	2008–2012	1	1	0	2
4	Karin Janz	East Germany	1968–1972	1	1	0	2
6	Ágnes Keleti	Hungary	1952–1956	1	0	1	2
7	Larisa Latynina	Soviet Union	1956–1964	0	2	1	3
8	Sunisa Lee	United States	2020–2024	0	0	2	2

==== Medalists by country ====
Rank	Nation	Gold	Silver	Bronze	Total
1	Russia	4	0	0	4
2	China	3	4	2	9
3	Soviet Union	2	4	6	12
4	East Germany	2	3	1	6
5	Romania	2	2	1	5
6	Hungary	2	1	2	5
7	United States	1	4	5	10
8	Algeria	1	0	0	1
8	Belgium	1	0	0	1
8	Czechoslovakia	1	0	0	1
8	France	1	0	0	1
12	ROC	0	1	0	1
12	Unified Team	0	1	0	1
14	Germany	0	0	1	1
14	Great Britain	0	0	1	1

== Gallery ==
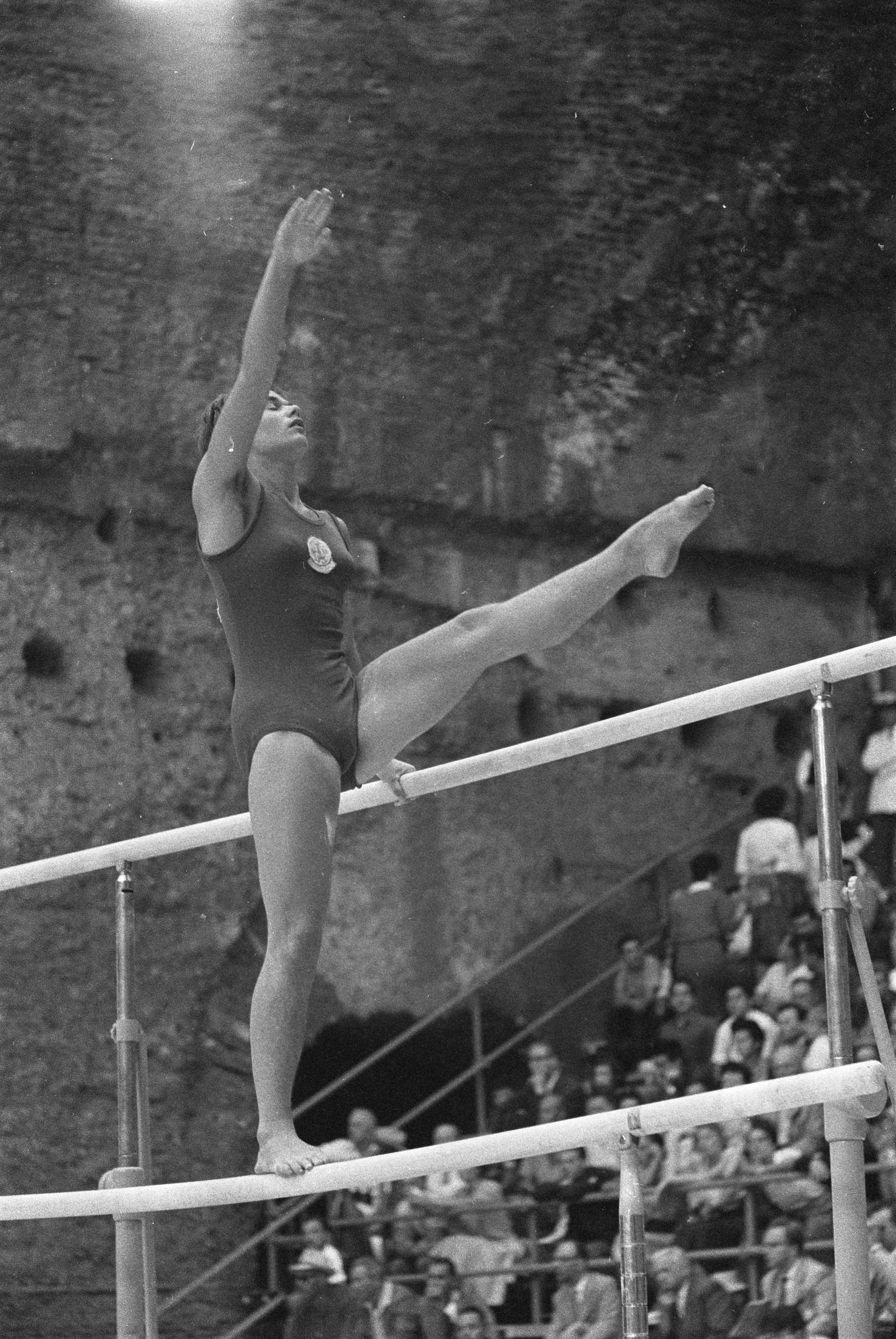
Bep Ipenburg, 1960

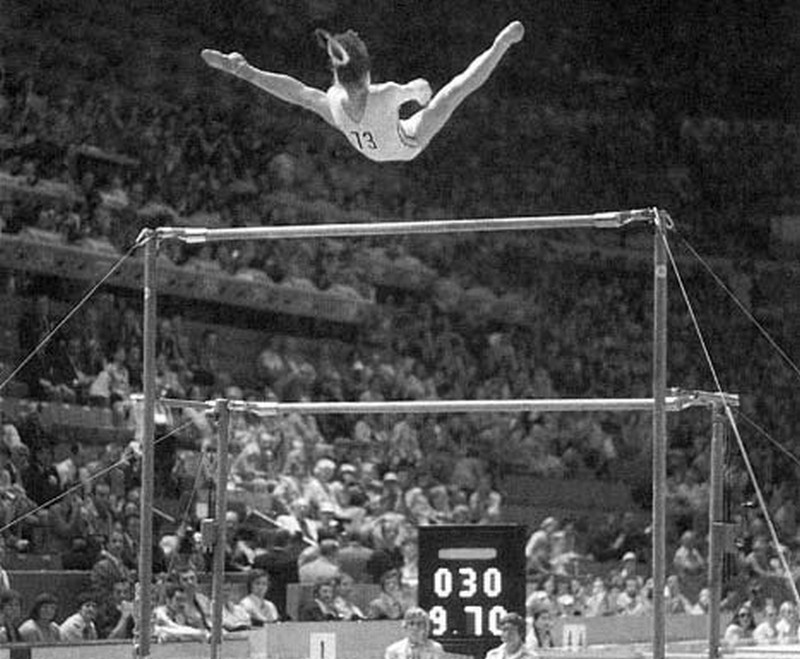
Nadia Comăneci, 1976

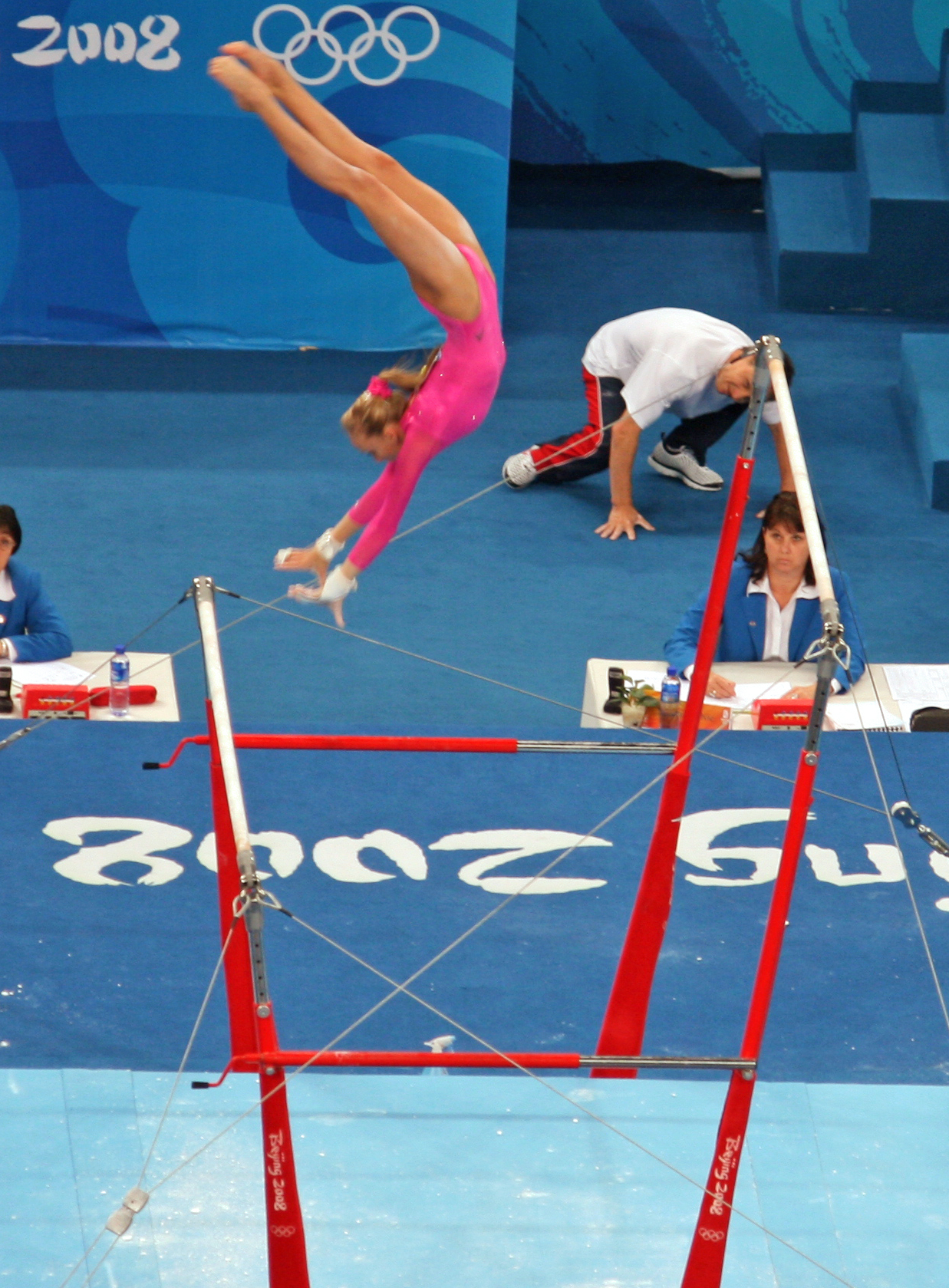
Nastia Liukin, 2008

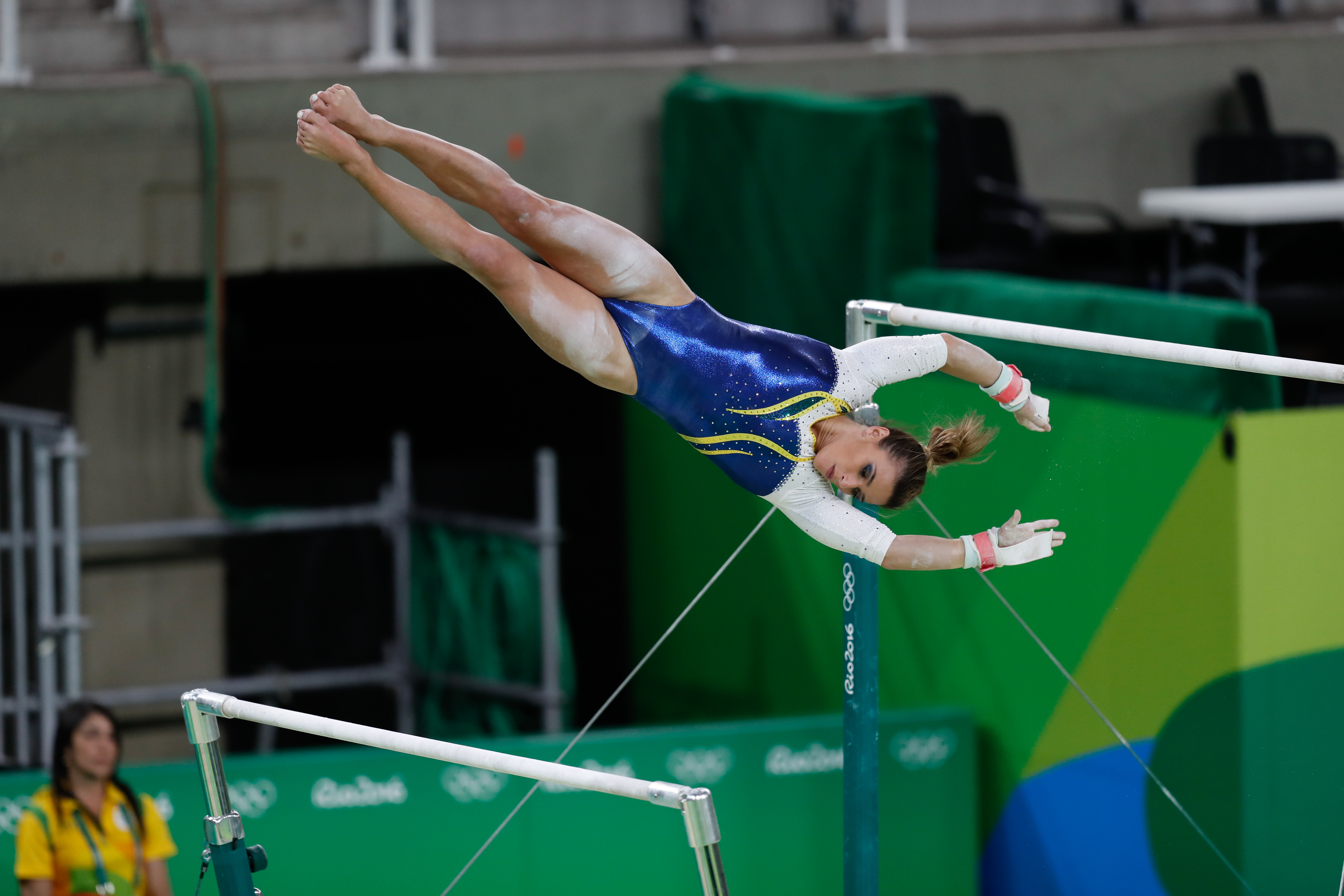
Jade Barbosa, 2016

Women's Uneven Bars at the Olympics
