= Triathlon at the 2000 Summer Olympics – Women's =

Women's Triathlon at the Games of the XXVII Olympiad
- Venue: Sydney Opera House
- Date: 16 September
- Competitors: 48 from 24 nations
- Winning time: 2:00:40.52

Medalists
1st place, gold medalist(s)		Brigitte McMahon	Switzerland
2nd place, silver medalist(s)		Michellie Jones	Australia
3rd place, bronze medalist(s)		Magali Messmer	Switzerland

The women's triathlon was part of the Triathlon at the 2000 Summer Olympics programme. It was the first appearance of the event, and one of the first-day events at the 2000 Summer Olympics. The competition was held on Saturday, September 16, 2000 at the Sydney Opera House in Sydney.

== Competition format ==
The race was held over the "international distance" (also called "Olympic distance") and consisted of 1,500 metres (0.93 mi) swimming, 40 kilometres (25 mi), road bicycle racing, and 10 kilometres (6.2 mi) road running.

== Results ==
48 athletes competed in women's triathlon; only eight of them dropped out of the cycling phase.

Rank	#	Triathlete	Country	Swimming	Cycling	Running	Total time^{*}	Difference
1st place, gold medalist(s)	35	Brigitte McMahon	Switzerland	19:44.58	1:05:42.20	35:13.64	2:00:40.52	—
2nd place, silver medalist(s)	28	Michellie Jones	Australia	19:43.88	1:05:32.90	35:25.77	2:00:42.55	+00:02.03
3rd place, bronze medalist(s)	34	Magali Messmer	Switzerland	19:39.38	1:05:40.00	35:49.45	2:01:08.83	+00:28.31
4	10	Joanna Zeiger	United States	19:45.58	1:05:38.30	36:01.86	2:01:25.74	+00:45.22
5	29	Loretta Harrop	Australia	19:37.98	1:05:40.70	36:24.14	2:01:42.82	+01:02.30
6	11	Sheila Taormina	United States	19:02.78	1:06:24.30	37:18.83	2:02:45.91	+02:05.39
7	45	Isabelle Mouthon-Michellys	France	19:48.98	1:05:28.50	37:35.93	2:02:53.41	+02:12.89
8	46	Christine Hocq	France	19:43.78	1:05:33.90	37:44.22	2:03:01.90	+02:21.38
9	30	Nicole Hackett	Australia	19:41.08	1:05:37.10	37:52.63	2:03:10.81	+02:30.29
10	25	Nancy Kemp-Arendt	Luxembourg	19:42.78	1:05:43.30	37:48.86	2:03:14.94	+02:34.42
11	20	Sandra Soldan	Brazil	19:45.28	1:05:41.10	37:53.48	2:03:19.86	+02:39.34
12	15	Nina Anissimova	Russia	19:47.58	1:05:42.00	37:56.77	2:03:26.35	+02:45.83
13	9	Jennifer Gutierrez	United States	19:44.98	1:05:41.00	38:12.50	2:03:38.48	+02:57.96
14	38	Kiyomi Niwata	Japan	19:46.98	1:05:36.20	38:29.83	2:03:53.01	+03:12.49
15	41	Stephanie Forrester	Great Britain	21:12.18	1:08:20.90	34:23.03	2:03:56.11	+03:15.59
16	2	Kathleen Smet	Belgium	20:54.68	1:06:38.90	36:32.40	2:04:05.98	+03:25.46
17	39	Akiko Hirao	Japan	20:30.08	1:07:06.10	36:42.52	2:04:18.70	+03:38.18
18	48	Anja Dittmer	Germany	20:30.18	1:06:58.30	37:08.40	2:04:36.88	+03:56.36
19	33	Nóra Edöcsény	Hungary	20:28.48	1:07:05.30	37:46.25	2:05:20.03	+04:39.51
20	5	Silvia Gemignani	Italy	19:46.58	1:07:46.30	37:48.38	2:05:21.26	+04:40.74
21	49	Joelle Franzmann	Germany	19:41.48	1:05:35.60	40:09.88	2:05:26.96	+04:46.44
22	8	Evelyn Williamson	New Zealand	20:28.08	1:07:01.80	38:08.42	2:05:38.30	+04:57.78
23	32	Erika Molnar	Hungary	21:05.98	1:08:31.11	36:02.41	2:05:39.50	+04:58.98
24	26	Maribel Blanco	Spain	21:15.98	1:08:21.41	37:00.45	2:06:37.84	+05:57.32
25	23	Wieke Hoogzaad	Netherlands	20:38.38	1:08:57.71	37:09.39	2:06:45.48	+06:04.96
26	24	Silvia Pepels	Netherlands	20:37.38	1:06:53.90	39:33.73	2:07:05.01	+06:24.49
27	6	Edith Cigana	Italy	20:42.28	1:06:52.10	39:32.43	2:07:06.81	+06:26.29
28	27	Marie Overbye	Denmark	20:56.08	1:06:41.50	39:39.93	2:07:17.51	+06:36.99
29	44	Renata Berková	Czech Republic	19:48.78	1:09:49.30	38:30.29	2:08:08.37	+07:27.85
30	7	Lizel Moore	South Africa	21:01.48	1:08:32.90	38:43.81	2:08:18.19	+07:37.67
31	18	Isabelle Turcotte Baird	Canada	20:59.98	1:08:37.10	38:52.41	2:08:29.49	+07:48.97
32	12	Wang Dan	China	20:50.78	1:08:52.20	39:06.12	2:08:49.10	+08:08.58
33	22	Ingrid van Lubek	Netherlands	20:54.08	1:08:45.80	39:49.12	2:09:29.00	+08:48.48
34	3	Iona Wynter	Jamaica	20:53.58	1:08:43.00	40:48.11	2:10:24.69	+09:44.17
35	47	Beatrice Mouthon	France	21:15.48	1:09:03.90	40:48.70	2:11:08.08	+10:27.56
36	36	Sibylle Matter	Switzerland	20:36.28	1:12:54.60	39:54.50	2:13:25.38	+12:44.86
37	40	Maria Morales	Colombia	22:44.58	1:12:33.60	38:25.20	2:13:43.38	+13:02.86
38	17	Sharon Donnelly	Canada	20:32.48	1:14:41.50	39:21.61	2:14:35.59	+13:55.07
39	4	Aniko Gog	Hungary	21:16.18	1:11:41.29	41:53.08	2:14:50.55	+14:10.03
40	14	Shi Meng	China	20:26.18	1:12:42.23	43:32.32	2:16:40.73	+16:00.21
—	1	Mieke Suys	Belgium	20:46.08	Did not finish			
—	16	Carol Montgomery	Canada	20:33.18	Did not finish			
—	19	Mariana Ohata	Brazil	20:34.28	Did not finish			
—	21	Carla Moreno	Brazil	20:36.29	Did not finish			
—	31	Karina Fernández	Costa Rica	23:53.68	Did not finish			
—	37	Haruna Hosoya	Japan	20:41.98	Did not finish			
—	42	Sian Brice	Great Britain	20:26.78	Did not finish			
—	43	Michelle Dillon	Great Britain	21:01.08	Did not finish			

- * Including Transition 1 (swimming-to-cycling) and T2 (cycling-to-running), roughly a minute.
- No one is allotted the number 13.
- LAP - Lapped by the leader on the cycling course.
