= Sun Dan =

Sun Dan may refer to:

- Sun Guangyuan (1900–1979), Chinese mathematician
- Sun Dan (gymnast) (born 1986), Chinese rhythmic gymnast
- Sun Dan (swimmer) (born 1985), Chinese former swimmer
