= Haitao =

Haitao (Chinese: 海涛 (mostly)，meaning "oceanic billows") is a given name of Chinese origin that is principally used as a masculine name. It may refer to:

- Du Haitao (born 1987), Chinese television presenter
- Fu Haitao (born 1993), Chinese triple jumper
- Hao Haitao (born 1968), Chinese soccer coach
- Liu Haitao (born 1983), Chinese sprint canoer
- Qiu Haitao (born 1973), Chinese female softball player
- Zhang Haitao (born 1970), Chinese soccer coach
