= Gymnastics at the 2000 Summer Olympics – Women's uneven bars =

Women's uneven bars at the Games of the XXVII Olympiad
- Venue: Sydney SuperDome
- Date: 17 – 24 September 2000

Medalists
1st place, gold medalist(s)		Svetlana Khorkina	Russia
2nd place, silver medalist(s)		Ling Jie	China
3rd place, bronze medalist(s)		Yang Yun	China

These are the results of the women's uneven bars competition, one of six events for female competitors in artistic gymnastics at the 2000 Summer Olympics in Sydney. The qualification and final rounds took place on September 17 and 24 at the Sydney SuperDome.

== Results ==
=== Qualification ===
Eighty-three gymnasts competed in the uneven bars event during the qualification round on September 17. The eight highest-scoring gymnasts advanced to the final on September 24. Each country was limited to two competitors in the final.

=== Final ===
Svetlana Khorkina successfully defended her Uneven Bars Title and Gold Medal from the 1996 Summer Olympics. She was only the second gymnast to successfully defend her Olympic Uneven Bars Title. Polina Astakhova of the former Soviet Union, who defended her 1960 Summer Olympics Uneven Bars Title at the 1964 Summer Olympics, was the first. Aliya Mustafina of Russia later became the third, capturing her back-to-back Olympic Gold Medals at the 2012 Games in London and 2016 Summer Olympics.

Rank	Gymnast	Score
Gold medal	Svetlana Khorkina (RUS)	9.862
Silver medal	Ling Jie (CHN)	9.837
Bronze medal	Yang Yun (CHN)	9.787
4	Viktoria Karpenko (UKR)	9.775
5	Tatyana Zharganova (BLR)	9.737
6	Olga Roshupkina (UKR)	9.725
7	Yelena Produnova (RUS)	9.650
8	Elvire Teza (FRA)	9.512
