= Zhou Yan =

Zhou Yan may refer to:

- Zhou Yan (curler) (born 1982), Chinese curler
- Zhou Yan (softball) (born 1979), Chinese softball player
- Zhou Yan (rugby union), Chinese rugby sevens player
- GAI (musician) (born 1987), birth name Zhou Yan, Chinese singer and songwriter
- Yan Zhou (curler) (born 1992), Chinese wheelchair curler
