= Donald Miranda =

Italian diver (born 1972)

Personal information
- Nationality: Italian
- Born: 19 October 1972 (age 53) Turin, Italy

Sport
- Sport: Diving
Medal record
Men's diving
Representing Italy
European Championships
Gold medal – first place	1999 Istanbul	3 m synchro
Bronze medal – third place	1997 Seville	3 m synchro

Donald Miranda (born 19 October 1972) is a retired Italian diver.

He was born in Turin. At the 2000 Olympic Games he finished 16th in the 3 metre springboard event and eighth together with Nicola Marconi in the synchronized 3 metre springboard event. At time of competition, he weighed 75 kg (165 lbs) and stood at 180 cm (5 ft 10 1/2 in.)
