= Diving at the 1996 Summer Olympics =

Diving at the Games of the XXVI Olympiad
- Venue: Georgia Tech Aquatic Center
- Dates: 26 July 1996 through 2 August 1996
- No. of events: 4
- Competitors: 122 from 39 nations

At the 1996 Summer Olympics in Atlanta, four diving events were contested during a competition that took place at the Georgia Tech Aquatic Center, from 26 July to 2 August, comprising a total of 122 divers from 39 nations.

== Medal summary ==
=== Men ===
Event	Gold	Silver	Bronze
3 m springboard	Xiong Ni; China	Yu Zhuocheng; China	Mark Lenzi; United States
10 m platform	Dmitri Sautin; Russia	Jan Hempel; Germany	Xiao Hailiang; China

=== Women ===
Event	Gold	Silver	Bronze
3 m springboard	Fu Mingxia; China	Irina Lashko; Russia	Annie Pelletier; Canada
10 m platform	Fu Mingxia; China	Annika Walter; Germany	Mary Ellen Clark; United States

== Medal table ==
Rank	Nation	Gold	Silver	Bronze	Total
1	China	3	1	1	5
2	Russia	1	1	0	2
3	Germany	0	2	0	2
4	United States	0	0	2	2
5	Canada	0	0	1	1
Totals (5 entries)		4	4	4	12

== Participating nations ==
Here are listed the nations that were represented in the diving events and, in brackets, the number of national competitors.

- Armenia (2)
- Australia (7)
- Austria (2)
- Azerbaijan (1)
- Belarus (5)
- Bolivia (1)
- Bulgaria (1)
- Canada (6)
- China (7)
- Chinese Taipei (2)
- Costa Rica (1)
- France (1)
- Georgia (2)
- Germany (7)
- Great Britain (5)
- Greece (1)
- Hong Kong (1)
- Hungary (2)
- Italy (2)
- Japan (3)
- Kazakhstan (5)
- Kuwait (2)
- Mexico (5)
- North Korea (3)
- Puerto Rico (2)
- Romania (3)
- Russia (7)
- South Korea (4)
- Spain (5)
- Sri Lanka (1)
- Sweden (3)
- Switzerland (1)
- Tajikistan (2)
- Thailand (2)
- Ukraine (6)
- United States (8)
- Uruguay (1)
- Venezuela (1)
- FR Yugoslavia (2)
- Zimbabwe (1)

== See also ==
- Diving at the 1994 Commonwealth Games
- Diving at the 1995 Pan American Games
- Diving at the 1998 Commonwealth Games

== Sources ==
- "Olympic Medal Winners". International Olympic Committee.
- The Atlanta Committee for the Olympic Games (ACOG) (1997). The Official Report of the Centennial Olympic Games - Volume III: The Competition Results (pdf) (in English and French). Atlanta, GA: Peachtree Publishers. ISBN 1-56145-169-X. OCLC 36994823.
