= Diving at the 1999 Summer Universiade =

The Diving competition in the 1999 Summer Universiade were held in Palma de Mallorca, Spain.

== Medal overview ==
Event	Gold	Silver	Bronze
Men's 1-Meter Springboard	Wang Feng (CHN)	Philippe Comtois (CAN)	Dean Pullar (AUS)
Men's 3-Meter Springboard	Wang Kenan (CHN)	Ken Terauchi (JPN)	Rafael Álvarez (ESP)
Men's Platform	José Antonio Guerra (CUB)	Fernando Platas (MEX)	Jesús Aballi (CUB)
Men's Team	China (CHN)	Mexico (MEX)	United States (USA)
Women's 1-Meter Springboard	Yuliya Pakhalina (RUS)	Irina Lashko (RUS)	Jennifer Lingamfelter (USA)
Women's 3-Meter Springboard	Fu Mingxia (CHN)	Irina Lashko (RUS)	Yuliya Pakhalina (RUS)
Women's Platform	Fu Mingxia (CHN)	Wang Rui (CHN)	Anne Montminy (CAN)
Women's Team	China (CHN)	Russia (RUS)	Canada (CAN)

== Medal table ==
Rank	Nation	Gold	Silver	Bronze	Total
1	China (CHN)	6	1	0	7
2	Russia (RUS)	1	3	1	5
3	Cuba (CUB)	1	0	1	2
4	Mexico (MEX)	0	2	0	2
5	Canada (CAN)	0	1	2	3
6	Japan (JPN)	0	1	0	1
7	United States (USA)	0	0	2	2
8	Australia (AUS)	0	0	1	1
8	Spain (ESP)	0	0	1	1
Totals (9 entries)		8	8	8	24
