= Melisa Moses =

American diver

Personal information
- Full name: Melisa A. Moses
- Nationality: American
- Born: February 28, 1972 (age 54) Jacksonville, Florida, U.S.
- Height: 155 cm (5 ft 1 in)
- Weight: 50 kg (110 lb)

Sport
- Sport: Diving
Medal record
Representing United States
Pan American Games
Silver medal – second place	1995 Mar del Plata	3m springboard

Melisa A. Moses (born February 28, 1972) is a former American diver. Born in Jacksonville, Florida, she competed in the women's 3 metre springboard event at the 1996 Summer Olympics in Atlanta, finishing in fourth place.

== Early life ==
Moses was born in Jacksonville, Florida.

== International diving career ==
At the 1995 Pan American Games in Mar del Plata, Argentina, Moses captured the silver medal in the women's 3-meter springboard competition, finishing behind teammate Annie Pelletier of Canada.

Moses qualified for the United States Olympic team for the 1996 Summer Olympics in Atlanta, Georgia. In the women's 3-meter springboard event, she advanced to the finals, ultimately finishing fourth overall with a cumulative score of 507.99 points, missing the bronze medal by fewer than five points.
