= Rafael Álvarez (diver) =

Spanish diver (born 1971)

Personal information
- Born: 29 October 1971 (age 54) Las Palmas de Gran Canaria, Spain
- Height: 5 ft 7 in (171 cm)
Medal record
Men's diving
Representing Spain
European Championships
Bronze medal – third place	1997 Seville	1 m springboard
Bronze medal – third place	2000 Helsinki	3 m synchro
Universiade
Bronze medal – third place	1999 Palma de Mallorca	3 m springboard

Rafael Álvarez Serrano (born 29 October 1971 in Las Palmas de Gran Canaria, Las Palmas) is a retired male diver from Spain, best known for winning the bronze medals at the 1997 European Championships in Seville, Spain and at the World University Games in 1999. He represented his native country in four consecutive Summer Olympics, starting in 1988. Alvarez also became well known in the United States while competing for the University of Alabama. He earned the title of "SEC champion" during his career at the University of Alabama. He has returned to the University of Alabama and now teaches multiple Spanish classes at the University.
