= Becky Ruehl =

American diver

Personal information
- Born: December 23, 1977 (age 48) Lakeside Park, Kentucky, United States

Sport
- Sport: Diving
Medal record
Representing United States
Pan American Games
Bronze medal – third place	1995 Mar del Plata	10m platform

Becky Ruehl (born December 23, 1977) is an American former diver. She competed in the women's 10 metre platform event at the 1996 Summer Olympics.
