= Diving at the 1995 Pan American Games =

- No. of events: 6 (3 men, 3 women)
- Competitors: 37 from 10 nations

This page shows the results of the Diving Competition for men and women at the 1995 Pan American Games, held from March 11 to March 26, 1995 in Mar del Plata, Argentina. There were three events, for both men and women.

== Medal summary ==
=== Medal table ===
Rank	Nation	Gold	Silver	Bronze	Total
1	Mexico	2	2	0	4
2	Canada	2	1	2	5
3	United States	1	3	3	7
4	Cuba	1	0	1	2
Totals (4 entries)		6	6	6	18

=== Medalists ===
==== Men's Events ====
Event	Gold	Silver	Bronze
1 m springboard	Dean Panaro; United States	Fernando Platas; Mexico	Abel Ramírez; Cuba
3 m springboard	Fernando Platas; Mexico	Mark Bradshaw; United States	David Bédard; Canada
10 m platform	Fernando Platas; Mexico	Juan Acosta; Mexico	Patrick Jeffrey; United States

==== Women's Events ====
Event	Gold	Silver	Bronze
1 m springboard	Mayte Garbey; Cuba	Annie Pelletier; Canada	Catherine Zarse; United States
3 m springboard	Annie Pelletier; Canada	Melisa Moses; United States	Bobbi McPherson; Canada
10 m platform	Anne Montminy; Canada	Angela Trostel; United States	Rebecca Ruehl; United States

== Participating nations ==
A total of 10 nations entered divers. The numbers in parentheses represents the number of participants entered.

- Argentina (1)
- Bolivia (1)
- Brazil (4)
- Canada (10)
- Cuba (3)
- Mexico (4)
- Puerto Rico (1)
- United States (11)
- Venezuela (1)
- Uruguay (1)

== See also ==
- Diving at the 1996 Summer Olympics
