= Dean Pullar =

Australian Olympic diver

Personal information
- Full name: Dean Lester Pullar
- Born: 11 May 1973 (age 53) Melbourne, Victoria, Australia
Medal record
Men's diving
Representing Australia
Olympic Games
Bronze medal – third place	2000 Sydney	Springboard synchro
World Championships
Bronze medal – third place	1998 Perth	Springboard synchro
Commonwealth Games
Silver medal – second place	1998 Kuala Lumpur	1 m springboard
Silver medal – second place	1998 Kuala Lumpur	3 m springboard
Universiade
Bronze medal – third place	1997 Sicily	3 m springboard
Bronze medal – third place	1999 Palma	1 m springboard

Dean Lester Pullar (born 11 May 1973 in Melbourne, Victoria) is an Australian diver, who won a bronze medal in the 2000 Summer Olympics alongside Robert Newbery. He was an Australian Institute of Sport scholarship holder. Dean currently owns and runs the family cold store warehouse situated on the old family orchard in Cobram, Victoria.
