= Ling Jie =

Chinese artistic gymnast

- Full name: Ling Jie
- Born: October 22, 1982 (age 43) Hengyang, Hunan

Gymnastics career
- Discipline: Women's artistic gymnastics
- Country represented: China
- Head coach: Liu Quinling
- Assistant coach: Zhimin Xie
- Choreographer: Quanjin Liu
Medal record
Women's gymnastics
Representing China
Olympic Games
Silver medal – second place	2000 Sydney	Uneven Bars
World Championships
Gold medal – first place	1999 Tianjin	Balance Beam
Bronze medal – third place	1999 Tianjin	Uneven Bars
World Cup Final
Gold medal – first place	2000 Glasgow	Uneven Bars
Bronze medal – third place	2000 Glasgow	Balance Beam
Asian Games
Gold medal – first place	1998 Bangkok	Team
East Asian Games
Gold medal – first place	2001 Osaka	Team
Silver medal – second place	2001 Osaka	Balance Beam
Summer Universiade
Gold medal – first place	2001 Beijing	Team
Silver medal – second place	2001 Beijing	Uneven Bars
National Games
Gold medal – first place	1997 Shanghai	Team
Gold medal – first place	1997 Shanghai	Uneven Bars
Gold medal – first place	1997 Shanghai	Balance Beam
Silver medal – second place	2001 Guangzhou	Team

Ling Jie (born October 22, 1982) is a retired Chinese artistic gymnast. She was the 1999 World Champion on the balance beam, the 2000 Chinese all-around national champion, and the silver medalist on the uneven bars at the 2000 Olympics in Sydney.

Ling was also a member of the bronze medal-winning team at the 2000 Olympics, but the medal was stripped by the IOC in 2010 after one of the Chinese team members, Dong Fangxiao, was found to be underage during the competition. In March 2012, the 1999 World Championship Team Bronze was forfeited by China and given to Ukraine in light of the same information.

She is the innovator of a skill on the uneven bars that bears her name in the Code of Points: the "Ling," a full pirouetting front giant starting and ending in the inverted grip.
