= Wang Fang (synchronized swimmer) =

Chinese synchronized swimmer

Personal information
- National team: China
- Born: 29 July 1977 (age 48) Nanjing, Jiangsu, China
- Height: 1.67 m (5 ft 6 in)
- Weight: 51 kg (112 lb)

Sport
- Sport: Swimming
- Strokes: Synchronized swimming

Wang Fang (Chinese: 王芳, born 29 July 1977) is a Chinese former synchronized swimmer who competed in the 2000 Summer Olympics. She has also been a coach on the Chinese national team since 2014.

After her retirement in 2001, Wang Fang returned to her hometown Nanjing where she trained a few local children in Xuanwu District. Among them were Gu Xiao and Guo Li, then only 9 years old, and Wang Fang coached them all the way from the district youth team to the senior national team. Liang Xinping (a year younger than Gu Xiao and Guo Li) also came under her wing at the age of 12. The trio was on Wang Fang's national team, who won silver at the 2016 Summer Olympics.
