= Fu Mingxia =

Chinese diver (born 1978)

Personal information
- Born: August 16, 1978 (age 47) Wuhan, Hubei, People's Republic of China
- Education: Tsinghua University
- Spouse: Anthony Leung (m.2002–present)
- Children: 3

Sport
- Country: People's Republic of China
Medal record
Women's diving
Representing China
Olympic Games
| Gold medal – first place | 1992 Barcelona | 10m Platform |
| Gold medal – first place | 1996 Atlanta | 10m Platform |
| Gold medal – first place | 1996 Atlanta | 3m Springboard |
| Gold medal – first place | 2000 Sydney | 3m Springboard |
| Silver medal – second place | 2000 Sydney | Synchro Springboard |
World Championships
| Gold medal – first place | 1991 Perth | 10m Platform |
| Gold medal – first place | 1994 Rome | 10m Platform |
Asian Games
| Gold medal – first place | 1990 Beijing | Team Event |
| Silver medal – second place | 1994 Hiroshima | 3m Springboard |
| Bronze medal – third place | 1990 Beijing | 10m Platform |
Universiade
| Gold medal – first place | 1999 Palma de Mallorca | 3 m springboard |
| Gold medal – first place | 1999 Palma de Mallorca | 10 m platform |

Fu Mingxia
- Chinese: 伏明霞
Transcriptions
Standard Mandarin
- Hanyu Pinyin: Fú Míngxiá

Fu Mingxia (born August 16, 1978, in Wuhan, Hubei) is a retired Chinese diver, multiple Olympic gold medalist and world champion. She won the platform-diving world championship in 1991 at the age of 12, making her the youngest diving champ of all time. She is also famous for being one of the youngest Olympic diving champions, having earned a gold at the 1992 Barcelona Games when she was just 13 years and 345 days old. Throughout the 1990s, Fu dominated the sport with her repertoire of extremely difficult dives. During the 2000 Sydney Olympics, Fu won her fourth gold medal, joining Americans Pat McCormick and Greg Louganis as the world's only quadruple Olympic-diving champions.

== Early life and career ==
Fu Mingxia was born into a working-class family in the city of Wuhan, located along the Yangtze River in central China. Inspired by an older sister, Fu enrolled in gymnastics at a local sports school at the age of 5. Though she was just a child, Fu demonstrated remarkable poise and body control. The coaches, however, felt that she was not flexible enough to make it as a gymnast. Instead, they suggested she pursue diving, though Fu, only about seven years old at the time, could not swim.

Fu made the transition from gymnast to springboard diver and was noticed by diving coach Yu Fen, who took Fu to Beijing in 1989 to train at a state-sponsored boarding school as a member of the state diving team.

Through a strenuous training program, Fu progressed quickly. Training sessions averaged four to five hours a day, seven days a week, with the occasional nine-hour day. At times, Fu practised 100 dives a day. In time, she was gliding so close to the platform during her dives that her short hair often touched the end during her descent toward the water.

In 1990, Fu made her international diving debut, winning a gold at the U.S. Open and also at the Goodwill Games, held that summer in Seattle. However, with pressure mounting, Fu placed third at the Asian Games held in Beijing in autumn 1990. Following this performance, she changed her routine, adding moves that were technically more difficult, but which she felt more comfortable performing.

By 1991, Fu was talented enough to attend the diving world championships, held in Perth, Australia. The competition was intense, and Fu found herself in eighth place in the final round because she had failed a compulsory dive. Fu pulled herself together, however, and ended up with the title, beating out the Soviet Union's World Cup winner Yelena Miroshina by nearly 25 points. At just 12 years old, Fu became the youngest international champion ever. It is a title she will hold forever because after the competition, swimming's national governing body changed the rules, requiring all competitors in international competitions be at least 14 years old.

While Fu initially made her mark on the 10-meter platform, she also began competing on the three-meter springboard. In April 1992, she won the gold on the springboard at the Chinese international diving tournament in Shanghai.

Fu made her Olympic debut at the 1992 Games, held in Barcelona, Spain. She won gold in the platform competition. At 13, she was the youngest medal winner at the Olympics that year and the second-youngest in the history of the Games. She also qualified as the youngest Olympic diving champion, a title she still holds.

Fu's success in her first Olympics drove her toward her second. In preparing for the 1996 Olympics, held in Atlanta, Fu trained seven hours a day, six days a week. Her only other activities included listening to music, watching television and getting massages. Fu's coaches drilled her hard, but she said she found comfort and peace from the physically and mentally straining regimen through music. Fu was in top form at the 1996 Olympics and shone on both the platform and springboard, taking gold in both events. She was the first woman in 36 years to win both events in a single Olympics.

== Career ==
In 1989, Fu Mingxia participated in the 2nd National Youth Games and won fifth place in the 10-meter platform diving event. In 1990, Fu Mingxia participated in the National Youth Diving Championships and won the Group B 10-meter platform title. In July, she took part in the Goodwill Games held in Seattle, USA. In September, she competed in the 11th Asian Games in Beijing and won the bronze medal in platform diving. On January 4, 1991, Fu Mingxia competed in the 6th World Swimming Championships in Perth, Australia, and won the women's 10-meter platform title with a score of 426.50 points. At the age of 13, she became the youngest world champion in the history of swimming and was listed in the Guinness World Records. She also participated in the China International Diving Open, winning the silver medal in the 3-meter springboard and the bronze medal in the 10-meter platform.

== Awards and accomplishments ==
- 1990 Goodwill Games – 10m platform 1st (11 years old)
- 1991 Asian Games – 10m platform 3rd (12 years old)
- 1991 World Swimming Championships – 10m platform 1st (12 years old)
- 1992 Olympic Games – 10m platform 1st (13 years old)
- 1993 FINA Diving World Cup – 3m springboard 3rd (15 years old)
- 1994 World Swimming Championships – 10m platform 1st (16 years old)
- 1994 Asian Games – 3m springboard 2nd (16 years old)
- 1995 FINA Diving World Cup – 10m platform 2nd (17 years old)
- 1995 FINA Diving World Cup – 3m springboard 1st (17 years old)
- 1996 Olympic Games – 10m platform 1st (18 years old)
- 1996 Olympic Games – 3m springboard 1st (18 years old)
- 1999 University Games – 10m platform 1st (21 years old)
- 1999 University Games – 3m springboard 1st (21 years old)
- 2000 FINA Diving World Cup – 3m springboard 2nd (22 years old)
- 2000 Olympic Games – 3m springboard synchronized (with Guo Jingjing) 2nd (22 years old)
- 2000 Olympic Games – 3m springboard 1st (22 years old)

== Retirement and comeback ==
Shortly after Atlanta, the triple-gold-medallist decided to retire and enrolled at Beijing's Tsinghua University to study management science. Fu also got involved in politics and in 1997 served as a delegate to the Communist Party's 15th Congress.

Fu spent about two years off the board. By 1998, however, Fu began diving with the university team, but on her own terms. On her own terms still meant a disciplined training schedule, but she reduced the number of hours per day down to five. Fu found that practicing just for the sake of practicing to be a pointless endeavor.

As a member of the university team, Fu competed in the 1999 Universiade in Palma, Spain, winning both the highboard and springboard titles. Less than a year back into it, she won silver at the Diving World Cup. Fu regained her spot on the national Olympic squad and also took up a new sport - three-meter synchronized diving - as she headed for the 2000 Olympics in Sydney, Australia. Fu and her partner, Guo Jingjing, practiced together for less than six months, yet earned a silver. The Russian pair that beat them had trained together for years. After the synchronized diving event, Fu went on to compete on the springboard. She won a gold, nailing her final dive, a reverse one-and-a-half somersault, two-and-a-half twist for nines when eights would have been enough to beat out Guo, her teammate. With her four gold medals and one silver, Fu became one of the most decorated Olympic divers of all time. She is one of only three divers to win an Olympic double-double in the individual events: Pat McCormick and Greg Louganis being the other two.

== Personal life ==
=== Family Life ===
Fu Mingxia's father, Fu Yijun, and her mother, Lin Xing'e, were once ordinary workers in Wuhan. Both have since retired early and been laid off. Fu Mingxia's elder sister, Fu Mingyan, once resigned from her job to take care of her during her pregnancy. Fu Mingxia's cousin, Fu Mingtian, is a badminton player for Singapore. Whenever Fu Mingtian competes in Hong Kong, Fu Mingxia always shows up in person to cheer her on.

== Marriage and motherhood ==
Fu married Antony Leung, former Financial Secretary of Hong Kong, on July 15, 2002, in Hawaii. Their marriage was not publicly revealed until July 30, 2002. They have a daughter (born February 26, 2003) and two sons (born December 12, 2004, and April 25, 2008).

Though Fu is no longer diving, she was a member of the Beijing Olympic bid committee for the 2008 Olympics. Beijing won the bid, and Fu went on to serve as an ambassador at the event.

== Public Activities ==
On September 30, 2001, Fu Mingxia attended the "Heart Health Carnival" event in Hong Kong, where she took a photo with children alongside Timothy Fok, the President of the Hong Kong Olympic Committee.

In December 2005, Fu Mingxia and Antony Leung attended the Heifer Christmas Charity Bazaar.

On October 25, 2008, Fu Mingxia and Antony Leung attended the Heifer "Race to Feed 2008" charity event to raise funds for the reconstruction efforts in the Sichuan earthquake-affected areas.

On March 30, 2010, Fu Mingxia attended the opening ceremony of the "A Full 5000 Years" World Cultural Tourism Expo, alongside Sony Entertainment Marketing Director Jiang Mingsheng and Hopewell Holdings Managing Director Thomas Wu.

On October 27, 2012, Fu Mingxia and Antony Leung attended the Heifer Charity Walk event.

On October 26, 2015, Fu Mingxia and her husband, Antony Leung, participated in the "Heifer Race to Feed" charity event along with their three children.

== See also ==
- List of members of the International Swimming Hall of Fame
- List of divers
