= Zhang Chujun =

Chinese windsurfer (born 1976)

Zhang Chujun (born 14 May 1976) is a Chinese windsurfer who competed in the 2000 Summer Olympics.
