= Jin Na (synchronized swimmer) =

Chinese swimmer

Personal information
- Nickname: Jinna
- Nationality: China
- Born: April 1, 1976 (age 50)
- Height: 1.68 m (5 ft 6 in)
- Weight: 57 kg (126 lb)

Sport
- Sport: Swimming
- Strokes: Synchronized swimming
- Updated on 31 May 2015

Jin Na (Chinese: 金娜, born 1 April 1976) is a former synchronized swimmer from China. Jin competed in the women's team event at both the 1996 and 2000 Summer Olympics, finishing in seventh place on both occasions. After retiring from the pool, she became the senior team coach for the Chinese national team from 2004 to 2012. Jin now works as a coach for the Waterloo Regional Synchronized Swimming Club in Canada.
