= Yang Yun (gymnast) =

Chinese gymnast

- Full name: Yang Yun
- Born: March 2, 1986 (age 40) Zhuzhou, Hunan

Gymnastics career
- Discipline: Women's artistic gymnastics
- Country represented: China
- Head coach: Lu Shanzhen
- Choreographer: Lui Qianjing
- Retired: August 2008
Medal record
Women's gymnastics
Representing China
Olympic Games
Bronze medal – third place	2000 Sydney	Uneven bars

Yang Yun (simplified Chinese: 杨云; traditional Chinese: 楊雲; pinyin: Yáng Yún; born March 2, 1986) is a Chinese gymnast. She was born in Zhuzhou, Hunan. She won the bronze medal on the uneven bars at the 2000 Summer Olympics and was part of the bronze medal-winning team, though the bronze was later stripped.

== Career ==
Yang won the bronze medal on the uneven bars at the 2000 Summer Olympics; she also had a fifth-place finish in the all-around. She also qualified for the floor exercise final, where she was 5th, and the balance beam final, where she was 8th. She was also a member of the bronze medal-winning Chinese team, but the medal was stripped in 2010 after one of the Chinese team members was found to be underage during the competition. Afterward, she competed at the 2001 Goodwill Games, where she was last in the all-around after receiving a score of 0 on her vault.

After retiring from competition, she enrolled at the Communication University of China and became a sports commentator.

== Personal life ==
She is married to Chinese gymnast Yang Wei.

== Age controversy ==
Yang's registered birth date for competition was December 2, 1984, which would make her old enough to compete in senior competition in 2000. However, after Yang admitted to being 14 when she competed in Sydney on Chinese national television, she was subject to an investigation by the International Gymnastics Federation (FIG), along with teammate Dong Fangxiao. Documents and website coverage published in China also repeatedly noted her actual age at the Olympics as being 14 and gave her birth date as being March 2, 1986.

Yang was allowed to keep her bronze medal in uneven bars, as her statements were considered insufficient evidence to prove her age was falsified, but she was given a warning by the FIG. Her teammate Dong Fangxiao had submitted documents with differing birth years, however, and her results were canceled. On April 28, 2010, the International Olympic Committee stripped the Chinese team's bronze medal.
