= Rebecca Gilmore =

Australian diver

Rebecca Manuel
Personal information
- Born: Rebecca Ellen Gilmore; 13 June 1979 (age 47) Sydney, Australia
Medal record
Women's diving
Representing Australia
Olympic Games
Bronze medal – third place	2000 Sydney	10m Platform Synchro

Rebecca Ellen Manuel née Gilmore (born 13 June 1979) is an Australian diver and diving coach. She won the bronze medal with diving partner Loudy Tourky in the women's 10 m synchronized platform at the 2000 Summer Olympics in her home city of Sydney, New South Wales, Australia. She also placed 18th in the 3 m springboard competition and 11th in the 10 m platform at the 2000 Summer Olympics.

Manuel now coaches diving in Sydney.
