= Hu Jia (diver) =

Chinese diver (born 1983)

Personal information
- Nationality: China
- Born: January 10, 1983 (age 43) Wuhan, Hubei

Sport
- Sport: Diving
- Event(s): 10 m, 10 m synchro
Medal record
Event	1st	2nd	3rd
Olympic Games	1	2	0
World Championships	2	0	0
Summer Universiade	2	0	0
Asian Games	2	0	0
Men's diving
Representing China
Olympic Games
Gold medal – first place	2004 Athens	10m Platform
Silver medal – second place	2000 Sydney	10m Platform
Silver medal – second place	2000 Sydney	10m Platform Synchro
World Championships
Gold medal – first place	2001 Fukuoka	10m Platform Synchro
Gold medal – first place	2005 Montreal	10m Platform
Summer Universiade
Gold medal – first place	2001 Beijing	Team
Gold medal – first place	2003 Daegu	Team
Gold medal – first place	2007 Bangkok	Team
Gold medal – first place	2001 Beijing	Synchronised platform
Gold medal – first place	2007 Bangkok	10m platform
Silver medal – second place	2003 Daegu	10m platform
Asian Games
Gold medal – first place	2002 Busan	10m Platform Synchro

Hu Jia (Chinese: 胡佳; pinyin: Hú Jiā; born January 10, 1983, in Wuhan, Hubei) is a male Chinese diver who won the gold medal at the 2004 Summer Olympics in the men's 10 metre platform. He was in sixth place at the end of the preliminary round, and fourth place after the semi-finals, but put in an excellent performance in the finals to take first place.

Hu also won two silver medals at the 2000 Summer Olympics in Sydney, Australia in the 10m Platform and 10 m Platform Synchronized.

== Personal life ==
Hu Jia married synchronised swimmer Luo Xi in 2013. She gave birth to a son in 2015.
