= Anne Montminy =

Canadian diver (born 1975)

Personal information
- Full name: Anne Katherine Montminy
- Born: January 28, 1975 (age 51) Montreal, Quebec, Canada
Medal record
Women's diving
Representing Canada
Olympic Games
Silver medal – second place	2000 Sydney	Synchronized 10m Platform
Bronze medal – third place	2000 Sydney	10m Platform
Universiade
Gold medal – first place	1993 Buffalo	10 m platform
Bronze medal – third place	1999 Palma de Mallorca	10 m platform
Pan American Games
Gold medal – first place	1995 Mar del Plata	10m Platform
Commonwealth Games
Gold medal – first place	1994 Victoria	10m Platform
Bronze medal – third place	1998 Kuala Lumpur	10m Platform

Anne Katherine Montminy (born January 28, 1975) is a Canadian former competitive diver and lawyer.

== Diving career ==
Montminy had a number of highpoints in her diving career; she won a gold medal on the 10m platform at 1994 Commonwealth Games and the 1995 Pan American Games.

She competed in the 1992 and 1996 Summer Olympics (in Barcelona and Atlanta), but did not advance to the finals. Four years later in 2000 at age 25, she won silver (10 m platform synchro) and bronze (10 m platform) in Sydney, Australia.

Montminy was inducted into the Canadian Olympic Hall of Fame in 2005. During her diving career, she trained at Pointe-Claire Diving Club in Pointe-Claire, Quebec.

== Professional career ==
Born in Montreal, Quebec, Montminy studied law parallel to her diving career, obtaining an LL.B. from the Université de Montréal in 1999, and an LL.M. from the New York University School of Law in 2002. She has since practised law at Davies Ward Phillips & Vineberg in Montreal, Clifford Chance LLP in San Francisco and at Howard Rice Nemerovski Canady Falk & Rabkin in San Francisco. She is a member of the California Bar.

In May 2008, Montminy did commentary for the CBC Television Network at the 2008 Beijing Olympics covering diving competitions.

== Personal life ==
In 2002, she married attorney Dan Goldman, member of the Haas family that owns Levi Strauss & Co.; they divorced in 2004.
