= Li Jin (swimmer) =

Chinese swimmer

Personal information
- Born: October 26, 1982 (age 43)

Sport
- Sport: Swimming
Medal record
Representing China
World Championships (SC)
Bronze medal – third place	2000 Athens	4x200m freestyle relay

Li Jin (Chinese: 李金; pinyin: Lǐ Jīn; born 26 October 1982) is a Chinese former swimmer who competed in the 2000 Summer Olympics.
