= Li Rouping =

Chinese synchronized swimmer

Personal information
- Born: September 17, 1982 (age 43) Chengdu, Sichuan, China

Sport
- Sport: Synchronised swimming

Li Rouping (Chinese: 李柔娉, born 17 September 1982) is a Chinese former synchronized swimmer who competed in the 2000 Summer Olympics.
