= Sang Xue =

Chinese diver

Personal information
- Nationality: China
- Born: December 7, 1984 (age 41) Tianjin

Sport
- Sport: Diving
- Event(s): 10 m, 10 m synchro
- Retired: 2007
Medal record
Event	1st	2nd	3rd
Olympic Games	1	-	-
World Championships	1	-	-
Women's diving
Representing China
Olympic Games
Gold medal – first place	2000 Sydney	10m Platform Synchro
World Championships
Gold medal – first place	2001 Fukuoka	10m Platform Synchro

Sang Xue (Chinese: 桑雪; pinyin: Sāng Xuě; born December 7, 1984, in Tianjin) is a female Chinese diver and former Olympian. She won the gold medal in the Synchronized 10m Platform competition at the 2000 Summer Olympics. She and her partner Li Na beat the Canadian team by 33 points.
