= Age requirements in gymnastics =

The age requirements in gymnastics are established by the Fédération Internationale de Gymnastique (FIG) and regulate the age at which gymnasts are allowed to participate in senior-level competitions. This age varies across gymnastics disciplines, ranging from 15 (acrobatic gymnastics) to 18 (men's artistic gymnastics and trampolining).

In the latter half of the 20th century, a series of controversies arose with regard to the ages of gymnasts participating in women's artistic gymnastics, some of them leading to sanctions by FIG, which paved the way for the age requirements for women to be raised from 14 to 15 in 1981, and then to 16 in 1997.

== History of age requirements in artistic gymnastics ==
The earliest champions in women's gymnastics tended to be in their 20s; most had studied ballet for years before entering the sport. Hungarian gymnast Ágnes Keleti won individual gold medals at the age of 35 at the 1956 Olympics. Larisa Latynina, the first great Soviet gymnast, won her first Olympic all-around medal at the age of 21, her second at 25 and her third at 29; she became the 1958 World Champion while pregnant with her daughter. Czech gymnast Věra Čáslavská, who followed Latynina to become a two-time Olympic all-around champion, was 22 before she started winning gold medals at the highest level of the sport, and won her final Olympic all-around title at the age of 26.

While the age limit for gymnasts was generally 18, exceptions were allowed for some competitions. For example, for the 1960 Summer Olympics, 16-year-old female gymnasts were allowed to compete if authorized by their federation. The 1964 Summer Olympics had no lower minimum for female gymnasts (men were still required to be 18). In 1970, the minimum required age for women to compete in senior events was set at 14. A year later, the Women's Technical Committee of the FIG released a commentary saying that the new age limit was to prevent abusive training and encourage more mature gymnastics.

In the 1970s, the average age of Olympic gymnastics competitors gradually began to decrease. While it was not unheard of for teenagers to compete in the 1960s — Ludmilla Tourischeva was sixteen at her first Olympics in 1968 — they slowly became the norm, as difficulty in gymnastics increased.

By the late 1970s, federations occasionally requested permission to allow slightly underage gymnasts to compete as seniors. One such example is that of Canadian gymnast Karen Kelsall, who legally competed in the 1976 Olympics at the age of 13. At the time, gymnasts had to turn 14 by the start of the Games to be eligible. Kelsall, with her December 1962 birthday, was five months shy of the requirement but was turning 14 within the Olympic year, and was granted a special exemption by the FIG to compete. Such exemptions were not automatic, however: American gymnast Tracee Talavera, who was named to the United States team for the 1979 World Championships, was deemed ineligible to compete due to her age of 12 1/2 years.

In response to the changing demands of the sport, at the 58th Congress of the FIG, held in July 1980 just before the Moscow Olympics, the minimum age was raised from 14 to 15. Under this rule, which went into effect in 1981, gymnasts were required to turn at least 15 years of age in the calendar year to compete in senior-level events. This age requirement remained in place until 1997, when it was raised one more year, from 15 to 16.

In the wake of widespread allegations of abuse across the sport in 2020, British gymnasts Lisa Mason, Hannah Whelan, and Catherine Lyons called for the age limit for women to be raised to 18, the same age limit used for men's artistic gymnastics.

== Reasons for age restrictions ==
Proponents of age restrictions, such as Jeanne Doperak, a sports medicine physician at the University of Pittsburgh Medical Center, contend that "[a child gymnast's] immature skeleton just isn't ready to handle the day-to-day stresses that will occur", and that the stresses imposed on only partly developed muscular/skeletal system by gymnastics are almost certain to cause damage that would persist into adulthood. Proponents also point to a 16-year American study of gymnastics injuries which concluded that gymnastics is the most dangerous sport for girls, with injury rates comparable to those found in boys who play soccer, basketball and hockey.

A gymnast whose bones are still growing is more likely than an adult to suffer skeletal injury, because the bones are more porous and the joints not yet fully formed. Lesions, which are precursors to stress fractures, occur in 11% of young female gymnasts, compared to 2.3% of girls and women in general. Anne-Marie Amies Oelschlager, a gynecologist, stated that the rise in testosterone and estrogen during puberty benefits gymnasts by leading to greater muscle mass and bone density.

In addition, proponents contend that practicing elite sports is mentally and emotionally demanding. Young gymnasts at these levels are often pressured to perform by coaches and parents, and ex-gymnasts have spoken out about behavioural and psychological problems common to the sport.

== Current regulations ==
Currently, age requirements vary per discipline; the minimum age is 18 in the year of competition for men's artistic gymnastics and aerobic gymnastics, 16 for women's artistic gymnastics and rhythmic gymnastics, 17 for trampolining, and 15 for acrobatic gymnastics. In 2020, in response to calls from British gymnasts to raise the age limit for women to 18, the FIG stated that the differing age limits for men and women were because "where physical maturity at a later age greatly benefits male gymnasts, it does not usually provide the same value for women".

=== Terminology ===
The term senior, in gymnastics, refers to any world-class gymnast who is age-eligible under FIG rules. The term junior is the age level below senior, and the age range also varies between disciplines; for example, it is age 14 to 15 for women's artistic gymnastics, and 13 to 19 for acrobatic gymnastics. The age range below this is known as youth or age group competition. Juniors have different requirements as well as restrictions on the elements they may perform; for example, in women's artistic gymnastics, any elements above an "E" difficulty rating that are performed will only be given the point value of "E" elements. In men's artistic gymnastics, some elements are banned for junior gymnasts.

=== Legal exceptions ===
At one time, an exception to the FIG's age restrictions applied to women's artistic gymnastics the year before the Olympics, when gymnasts who were one year below the required age, but would be the required age in the Olympic year, were allowed to compete as seniors at the World Championships and other FIG meets. For instance, gymnasts born in 1977 were allowed to compete at senior events in 1991, when they were 14 or turning 14 within the calendar year. However, the FIG eliminated this exception as of the 2012 Olympic cycle.

=== Verification procedures ===
According to official statements from the FIG, "the accepted proof of a gymnast’s eligibility for competition is a valid passport issued by the country of residence." This verification process has been criticized by some in the gymnastics community, with the argument that countries can manufacture and submit falsified documents for underage gymnasts. In several cases, gymnasts involved in age falsification have verified that they did in fact compete under forged passports provided to them by their federations.

Since 2009, gymnasts competing in FIG-sanctioned events at both the senior and junior level have been required to have licenses issued by the federation. These licenses reportedly verify the competitors' ages based on their passports. However, the licensing does not include any independent verification of submitted passport information.

=== Response from coaches and federations ===
The age limit was arguably one of the most contentious rule changes in gymnastics, frequently debated by coaches, gymnasts and members of the media. While some members of the sport, such as former USA Gymnastics president Bob Colarossi, expressed support for the age limit of 16, others, such as coach Béla Károlyi, heavily criticized it.

Supporters of the age restrictions have said that it has encouraged older gymnasts to remain in the sport. In 1989, gymnasts who had reached the age of 17 were already often considered to be of retirement age, and the average age of an international gymnast in 1994, before the new age requirements, was 16.49. By 2005, the average age was 18.10 years.

Opponents of the rule, such as Károlyi, argued that barring younger gymnasts could prevent the best gymnasts from competing simply based on their age. Nellie Kim, the president of the women's technical committee, said that younger gymnasts tend to fear difficult skills less and find it easier to perform difficult elements as they are lighter.

The average age of women's gymnasts has continued to increase, and the average women's gymnast at the 2020 Summer Olympics was almost 22. By the 2020s, as top gymnasts remained highly competitive into their mid and late 20s - Simone Biles was 27 when she won 2024 Summer Olympics, and 2024 Olympic floor champion Rebeca Andrade was 25 - women's gymnastics were no longer considered to necessarily peak in performance as teenagers.

== Age falsification ==
Age falsification is the practice of advancing gymnasts' ages to make them age-eligible for senior-level competition. Reports of age falsification among top-level international gymnasts first began to surface in the 1980s, after the age limit was raised from 14 to 15. This has frequently taken the form of inconsistently reported birthdates; at other times, speculation has been raised due to the young appearance of the gymnasts.

Falsification has been revealed and confirmed in several ways. In some cases, gymnasts themselves have come forward and publicly confirmed and verified the falsification. In other cases, documents revealing inconsistencies, such as original birth certificates, have been researched and uncovered by the press. Inconsistencies with reported birth dates and ages at different competitions have also led to the discovery of age falsification.

Gymnasts who have had their ages falsified, and have spoken about their experiences, have indicated that they were not given a choice in the matter. In a 2002 interview, Romanian gymnast Daniela Silivaş, whose age was advanced two years in the 1980s, noted: "One of the officials of the Federation told me 'Look at the passport, from today you're not 13 years old anymore but 15.' Nobody asked me if I agreed to this, I was just a child. They needed gold medals and everybody who was involved in gymnastics knew about these practices."

While age falsification was denied among many gymnastics officials, they later publicly admitted that the practice has occurred. In reference to the falsifications of the early 1990s and 1980s, the head of the Romanian Gymnastics Federation, Nicolae Vieru, was quoted in 2002: "Changing the ages was a worldwide practice ... we copied this from others." The FIG has publicly stated that they view age falsification as an unacceptable practice. However, there have only been three cases, those of Kim Gwang Suk in 1993 and Dong Fangxiao and Hong Su Jong in 2010, where the FIG has elected to take any action against a gymnastics federation for age falsification.

Age falsification has primarily been reported in women's artistic gymnastics; one exception is that, in 1993, the Dutch federation entered an underage group rhythmic gymnast member at the 1993 European Championships.

=== Reasons for age falsification ===
According to many scientific and medical studies, as well as reports from ex-gymnasts, younger gymnasts may have psychological or physical advantages in elite gymnastics competition.

Psychologically, younger gymnasts may be more fearless, and have less visceral appreciation for the potential for injury. They are therefore more likely to perform more dangerous, and more highly scored, routines with confidence and steadiness. Olympic medallist Nellie Kim told The New York Times that "Psychologically, I think they worry less". Daniela Silivaş, in her interview, commented, "You should know that I competed better at the age of 13 than at 17. I felt much better, physical [sic] and mentally."

Physically, younger gymnasts, particularly those who have not yet gone through puberty, tend to be lighter, smaller, more pliable and flexible, which aids them in performing more complex skills and gives them a better strength-to-weight ratio. When a gymnast hits puberty, growth spurts and weight gain may affect her centre of gravity, causing mental and physical stress as she must adjust, and in some cases relearn, her moves to compensate. Smaller gymnasts have generally excelled in the more challenging acrobatic elements required by the evolving Code of Points after the 1960s, although the introduction of open-ended difficulty in 2006 has been credited as favoring older gymnasts who have had more years to develop skills and strength to perform more challenging elements. In addition, older gymnasts may be more prone to certain types of injuries caused by overuse of bones and muscles; younger gymnasts are less likely to have such problems, or more likely to be able to work through pain while injured.

=== Major verified cases of age falsification ===
Kim Gwang Suk (North Korea): Kim, the 1991 World Champion on the uneven bars, was active on the international circuit between 1987 and 1993. During this time, several observers claimed she was too young for senior competition. The North Korean Gymnastics Federation submitted inconsistent dates of birth for Kim at various competitions, claiming that she was 15 for three consecutive years. As punishment, the FIG barred the North Korean women's team from the World Championships in 1993. She competed in the 1989 World Championships at the estimated age of 11 or 12 (i.e. born c. 1978 or 1977). However, she may have been younger than that. At the 1992 Olympics, she claimed she was 17 (i.e. born c. 1975). However, her front teeth were missing, leading Béla Károlyi to speculate that she may have been as young as 10 (i.e. born c. 1982) at the time. Her coaches said her missing teeth were caused by a training accident. Kim's front teeth were also missing when she competed at the 1991 World Championships.

Lavinia Agache (Romania): Agache competed at the 1981 World Championships at the age of 13, under a passport which gave her year of birth as 1967. She was in fact born in 1968. The falsification was suspected as early as 1981; Agache confirmed her 1968 birthdate to International Gymnast magazine in 2000.

Olga Bicherova (Soviet Union): Bicherova, the 1981 World Champion in the all-around event, was introduced at an early 1981 meet as a 12-year-old, but was claimed to have been born in 1966 (i.e. 15 years old) at the 1981 World Championships later in the same year.

Gina Gogean (Romania): Gogean competed in the 1992 Olympics with a passport with a 1977 birth year. However, in 2002 her original birth certificate was uncovered by the media, revealing she had been born in 1978.

Alexandra Marinescu (Romania): Marinescu, a World and team Olympic medalist in the mid-1990s, was given an earlier birth year from 1982 to 1981 in order to be eligible for the 1995 World Championships and 1996 Olympic Games.

Olga Mostepanova (Soviet Union): Mostepanova, who competed at the 1983 and 1985 World Championships and was the all-around gold medalist at the 1984 Friendship Games, has been reported as having 1968 and 1969 birth dates, but has stated that she was actually born in 1970.

Daniela Silivaş (Romania): Silivaş, a multiple World and Olympic gold medalist, competed as a junior until 1985, when her birth year was changed from 1972 to 1970. She went on to compete at the 1985 World Championships at the age of 13. Silivaş, a resident of the Atlanta metropolitan area, revealed the falsification to the media in 2002 during her Georgia marriage licence application.

Dong Fangxiao (People's Republic of China): Dong was a member of the bronze-medal winning Chinese team at the 2000 Summer Olympics. Her birthdate was listed as January 20, 1983, in the FIG database. However, it was discovered that her accreditation as a technical official at the 2008 Summer Olympics, where she worked as a vault secretary, listed her birthdate as January 23, 1986. Additionally, her blog stated she was born during the Year of the Ox, which would place her birthdate between February 1985 and February 1986. An FIG investigation determined in 2010 that Dong was 14 during the 2000 Olympics and the Chinese team should be stripped of its bronze medal. Dong's 1999 World Championships and World Cup results were vacated. In April 2010, the International Olympic Committee upheld the FIG's recommendation and nullified both the Chinese team's bronze medal and Dong's individual Olympic placement.

Hong Su Jong (North Korea), the 2007 World Championships silver medalist on vault, was investigated for age discrepancies in 2010. Hong competed at the 2004 Olympics with a March 9, 1985, birth date, but participated in subsequent Asian Games and World Championships meets with a 1986 year of birth. Her 2010 FIG license and 2010 Worlds registration indicated that she was born in 1989. The FIG responded in October 2010 by provisionally banning North Korea from competition for one month, which effectively barred them from the 2010 World Championships. In November 2010, the FIG extended the ban until October 5, 2012, fined the North Korean Federation $20,800, and banned Hong from competing even in national competition within North Korea.

=== 2008 Beijing Olympics age controversy ===
During the 2008 Summer Olympics the age of four Chinese gymnasts – He Kexin, Jiang Yuyuan, Deng Linlin, and Yang Yilin – was brought into question, with many foreign media outlets speculating that they were underage during the Olympics. Multiple age investigations were conducted at the urging of media, as well as United States Olympic Committee executive Jim Scherr and International Olympic Committee president Jacques Rogge, and the Fédération Internationale de Gymnastique (FIG) found that the gymnasts had met the age requirements and were eligible to compete. The Chinese sports administration also acknowledged that mistakes in its paperwork have contributed to the misunderstanding.
