= Xia Ye =

Chinese synchronized swimmer

Personal information
- Born: June 15, 1980 (age 46) Beijing, China

Sport
- Sport: Synchronised swimming

Xia Ye (Chinese: 夏晔, born 15 June 1980) is a Chinese former synchronized swimmer who competed in the 2000 Summer Olympics.
