= Sun Dan (swimmer) =

Chinese swimmer

Personal information
- Born: January 18, 1985 (age 41)

Sport
- Sport: Swimming
Medal record
Representing China
World Championships (SC)
Bronze medal – third place	2000 Athens	4x200m freestyle relay

Sun Dan (born 18 January 1985) is a Chinese former swimmer who competed in the 2000 Summer Olympics.
