= Shi Meng =

Chinese triathlete

Shi Meng (Chinese: 世萌; pinyin: Shi、Méng; born August 13, 1979) is an athlete from the People's Republic of China. She competes in triathlon.

Shi competed at the first Olympic triathlon at the 2000 Summer Olympics. She took fortieth place with a total time of 2:16:40.73. This was the slowest time of any athlete that finished the competition, though still placed Shi higher than the eight athletes that dropped out of the race.
