= Zhou Yan (softball) =

Chinese softball player (born 1979)

Zhou Yan (Chinese: 周妍; pinyin: Zhōu Yán; born 28 May 1979 in Dalian) is a female Chinese softball player who competed in the 2000 Summer Olympics.

In the 2000 Olympic softball competition she finished fourth with the Chinese team. She played two matches.
