= Xiong Ni =

Chinese diver

Personal information
- Born: January 11, 1974 (age 52) Changsha, Hunan, China
Medal record
Men's diving
Representing China
Olympic Games
Gold medal – first place	1996 Atlanta	3m Springboard
Gold medal – first place	2000 Sydney	3m Springboard
Gold medal – first place	2000 Sydney	3m Sync Springboard
Silver medal – second place	1988 Seoul	10m Platform
Bronze medal – third place	1992 Barcelona	10m Platform
World Championships
Silver medal – second place	1991 Perth	10m Platform
Asian Games
Gold medal – first place	1990 Beijing	Team Event
Silver medal – second place	1990 Beijing	10m Platform
Summer Universiade
Gold medal – first place	1993 Buffalo	3m Springboard
Gold medal – first place	1993 Buffalo	10m Platform

Xiong Ni (Chinese: 熊倪; pinyin: Xióng Ní; born January 11, 1974) is a Chinese diver who won his first Olympic medal at the age of 14 at the 1988 Summer Olympics in Seoul, South Korea. He also competed at the Olympics in 1992, 1996 and 2000.

== Biography ==
He attended an international competition for the first time in 1987, and won the title. He has since competed at the Olympic Games, winning 3 gold, 1 silver and one bronze medals; In addition, he has won 10 gold medals in the World Cup competition.

In 1993, Xiong graduated from the Hunan University international business school, specialising in industry and foreign trade In 1997 and once again in 2001 after national games he announced his intention to retire.

His biggest competitor Dmitri Sautin once paid him the tribute that, "I cannot claim to be the world's most outstanding diving athlete. In my opinion, the title of "King of Divers" belongs to Xiong Ni"

== Career highlights ==
- In 1982 selected for the Hunan Province team.
- In January, 1986 was selected for the national training center.
- In 1986 quadruple champion of the 1 meter board, 3 meters board, 5 meter platform and overall champion in the Chinese national diving championship (div 2)
- in 1987 in DDR, Canada, Mexico etc. in the international diving invitational meet, wins the men's platform diving event
- in 1987 silver medals for men's springboard and the diving platform event at the Sixth National Sports Championships
- in 1988 won the platform diving event at the 3rd Asia swimming championships in Guangzhou
- in 1988 silver medal in the men's platform diving at the Seoul Olympic Games
- in 1988 dual champion of men's springboard, and diving platform in the Swedish cup international championships
- in 1989 triple winner in the 6th session of World Cup diving championships for platform diving, the men's group event and the men and women mixed event
- in 1989 two gold medals in the 2nd National Youth Games diving competition in the diving platform and the springboard events
- in 1991 dual champion at the 7th World Cup diving championships in Canada for the men's group event and the men and women (mixed) events
- in 1992 Bronze medal at the Barcelona Olympic Games for platform diving
- in 1993 1 meter board champion at the seventh National athletic meet
- in 1993 triple winner in the 8th World Cup diving tournament held in Beijing, in 10 meters diving platforms, men's (group) event and the men and women (mixed) event
- in 1995 double winner in the 9th session of World Cup diving Championships in Atlanta, in the men's (group) event and the men and women (mixed) event
- in 1996 champion, 3 meters board at the Atlanta Olympic Games,
- in 1997 springboard champion at the eighth national Championships, announces retirement.
- In May, 1998 announced he was coming out of retirement.
- In 1999 Wenzhou international invitational tournament springboard champion, the Sweden grand prize contest springboard champion, the national championship competition springboard and the two person champion
- in 2000 wins the springboard two person event in the World Cup, partnered by Xiao Hailiang
- in 2000 gold medal at the Sydney Olympic Games in the men's 3 meters boards synchronised event, with Xiao Hailiang, and gold medal in the men's 3 meters boards individual
- in 2001 after winning the men's 3 meters springboards singles event at the ninth national athletic meet, Xiong once more announces his retirement.

== Other honors ==
- In 1989 voted by Swimming World magazine world's best diving athlete
- in 1996 August award of honorary the sports medal by the national physical culture commission
