= Xiao Hailiang =

Chinese diver

Personal information
- Nationality: Chinese
- Born: 24 January 1977 (age 49) Wuhan, Hubei, China

Sport
- Sport: Diving
Medal record
Men's diving
Representing China
Olympic Games
Gold medal – first place	2000 Sydney	3 m springboard synchro
Bronze medal – third place	1996 Atlanta	10 m platform
Summer Universiade
Gold medal – first place	1997 Sicily	10 m platform
Asian Games
Silver medal – second place	1994 Hiroshima	10 m platform

Xiao Hailiang (Chinese: 肖海亮; pinyin: Xiào Hǎiliàng; born January 24, 1977, in Wuhan, Hubei) is a Chinese diver who won a bronze medal at the 1996 Summer Olympics. He became an Olympic champion in the 3m Springboard Synchronized event at the 2000 Summer Olympics.
