= Diving at the 2000 Summer Olympics =

Diving at the Games of the XXVII Olympiad
- Venue: Sydney International Aquatic Centre
- Date: 22–30 September 2000
- No. of events: 8
- Competitors: 157 from 42 nations

At the 2000 Summer Olympics in Sydney, eight diving events were contested for the first time due to the inclusion of synchronized variants for each of the traditional events. The competition took place at the Sydney International Aquatic Centre, from 22 to 30 September, comprising a total of 157 divers from 42 nations.

== Medal summary ==
=== Men ===
Event	Gold	Silver	Bronze
3 m springboard	Xiong Ni; China	Fernando Platas; Mexico	Dmitri Sautin; Russia
10 m platform	Tian Liang; China	Hu Jia; China	Dmitri Sautin; Russia
Synchronized 3 m springboard	Xiong Ni and Xiao Hailiang; China	Dmitri Sautin and Alexandre Dobroskok; Russia	Robert Newbery and Dean Pullar; Australia
Synchronized 10 m platform	Dmitri Sautin and Igor Lukashin; Russia	Hu Jia and Tian Liang; China	Jan Hempel and Heiko Meyer; Germany

=== Women ===
Event	Gold	Silver	Bronze
3 m springboard	Fu Mingxia; China	Guo Jingjing; China	Dörte Lindner; Germany
10 m platform	Laura Wilkinson; United States	Li Na; China	Anne Montminy; Canada
Synchronized 3 m springboard	Vera Ilina and Yulia Pakhalina; Russia	Fu Mingxia and Guo Jingjing; China	Ganna Sorokina and Olena Zhupina; Ukraine
Synchronized 10 m platform	Li Na and Sang Xue; China	Émilie Heymans and Anne Montminy; Canada	Rebecca Gilmore and Loudy Tourky; Australia

== Medal table ==
Rank	Nation	Gold	Silver	Bronze	Total
1	China	5	5	0	10
2	Russia	2	1	2	5
3	United States	1	0	0	1
4	Canada	0	1	1	2
5	Mexico	0	1	0	1
6	Australia	0	0	2	2
6	Germany	0	0	2	2
8	Ukraine	0	0	1	1
Totals (8 entries)		8	8	8	24

== Participating nations ==
Here are listed the nations that were represented in the diving events and, in brackets, the number of national competitors.

- Argentina (1)
- Armenia (1)
- Australia (6)
- Austria (3)
- Azerbaijan (1)
- Belarus (2)
- Brazil (2)
- Canada (7)
- China (8)
- Chinese Taipei (4)
- Colombia (2)
- Cuba (6)
- Czech Republic (1)
- Finland (2)
- France (6)
- Georgia (1)
- Germany (8)
- Great Britain (8)
- Greece (5)
- Hong Kong (1)
- Hungary (4)
- Indonesia (3)
- Italy (5)
- Japan (1)
- Kazakhstan (5)
- Malaysia (3)
- Mexico (7)
- North Korea (5)
- Peru (1)
- Philippines (2)
- Puerto Rico (1)
- Romania (3)
- Russia (7)
- South Korea (4)
- Spain (5)
- Sweden (1)
- Switzerland (3)
- Thailand (2)
- Ukraine (9)
- United States (7)
- Venezuela (3)
- Zimbabwe (1)

== See also ==
- Diving at the 1998 Commonwealth Games
- Diving at the 1999 Pan American Games
- Diving at the 2002 Commonwealth Games

== Sources ==
- "Olympic Medal Winners". International Olympic Committee.
- Sydney Organising Committee for the Olympic Games (SOCOG) (2001). Official Report of the XXVII Olympiad - Volume Three: Results (PDF) (in English and French). Sydney, New South Wales: Sydney Organising Committee for the Olympic Games (SOCOG). ISBN 0-9579616-1-8. OCLC 49687523.
