= Wang Dan (triathlete) =

Chinese triathlete

Wang Dan (Chinese: 王丹; pinyin: Wáng Dān; born January 17, 1980) is an athlete from the People's Republic of China. She competes in triathlon.

Wang competed at the first Olympic triathlon at the 2000 Summer Olympics. She took thirty-second place with a total time of 2:08:49.10.

In the 2004 Summer Olympics, her rank diminished. From thirty-second to sixty-ninth, Wang dropped thirty-seven whole spots.
