= Qiu Haitao =

Chinese softball player

Qiu Haitao (simplified Chinese: 邱海涛; traditional Chinese: 邱海濤; pinyin: Qiū Hǎitāo; born August 15, 1973) is a female Chinese softball player. She competed in the 2000 Summer Olympics finishing fourth. She played three matches.
