= Dong Fangxiao =

Chinese artistic gymnast

- Born: 23 January 1986 (age 40) or 20 January 1983 (age 43) Tangshan, Hebei, China

Gymnastics career
- Discipline: Women's artistic gymnastics
- Country represented: China
- Head coach: Lu Shanzhen
- Music: Zorba the Greek (1999/2000)
Medal record
Women's gymnastics
Representing China
Olympic Games
Disqualified	2000 Sydney	Team
Artistic Gymnastics World Championships
Disqualified	1999 Tianjin	Team
World Cup Final
Bronze medal – third place	2000 Glasgow	Floor exercise
East Asian Games
Gold medal – first place	2001 Osaka	Team
Gold medal – first place	2001 Osaka	All-Around
Gold medal – first place	2001 Osaka	Vault
Gold medal – first place	2001 Osaka	Balance Beam
Gold medal – first place	2001 Osaka	Floor Exercise
National Games
Gold medal – first place	2001 Guangzhou	Floor Exercise
Bronze medal – third place	2001 Guangzhou	All-Around

Dong Fangxiao (Chinese: 董芳霄; pinyin: Dǒng Fāngxiāo) is a Chinese retired international gymnast who competed at the 2000 Summer Olympics. She won a bronze medal with the Chinese team at the Olympics, as well as the 1999 World Championships in Tianjin China, but both the medals were stripped from her and her teammates when it was discovered she had competed underage.

== Gymnastics career and controversy ==
=== Career ===
Dong Fangxiao began her gymnastics career at an early age. She was a member of her provincial team by the age of seven and was invited to join the Chinese National Team at the age of ten. In 1999, though by FIG rules she was too young as a thirteen year old, she began illegally competing as a senior gymnast internationally. At the 1999 World Championships in Tianjin China, she helped the Chinese team claim a bronze medal. Individually she placed 6th in the all-around, 4th in the floor exercise final and 7th in the balance beam event final. Dong was again named to the senior Chinese team for the 2000 Olympics, still too young to compete now at the age of fourteen. Her strong performances again helped the Chinese squad obtain a bronze medal in the team competition. Dong qualified for the all-around, floor, and vault event finals, but placed out of the medals on all three events; 25th, 6th, and 7th respectively.

After the Olympics she continued to compete for the Chinese team, participating in the 2001 East Asian Games, the University Games and the World Cup circuit. Dong retired from gymnastics in 2001 at the age of 15 due to bone necrosis in her leg. As reference, at the time of her retirement from gymnastics in 2001, Dong was still age ineligible to compete internationally as a senior, because her 16th birthday didn't fall until the 2002 calendar year.

=== Age falsification controversy ===
During her competitive career, Dong competed under a passport that gave her date of birth as 20 January 1983. However, when she was certified to work as a technical official at the 2008 Summer Olympics, she was registered with a 23 January 1986 birthdate. In addition, Dong gave the same date of birth on her CV. The 1986 birthdate would have made her 13 in 1999 and 14 at the Olympics – two years below the minimum age required by the International Federation of Gymnastics.

After an investigation, the FIG ruled that Dong had been underage and ineligible to compete as a senior in 1999 and 2000. Consequently, Dong's scores from both the 1999 Worlds and 2000 Olympics were nullified. In April 2010, the International Olympic Committee stripped the 2000 Chinese Olympic gymnastics team of its bronze medal in the team competition. The Chinese team was also stripped of their team medals from the 1999 World Championships. In addition, the FIG billed the Chinese Gymnastics Federation for the cost of the inquiry.

Chinese sports fans were critical of the Chinese sport governing body, rather than the International Olympic Committee, as being pushed to compete underage caused her irreparable knee damage. Netease sports columnist Li Jiayang wrote "Competing for her local team in the Chinese National Games, she damaged her knee permanently, in order to win an Olympic medal for the national team, her age was hidden (I don't dare to use the word 'falsify' which may cause trouble) and she has been humiliated. It’s enough to make you cry.”

== Personal life ==
As of 2010, Dong Fangxiao lives in New Zealand with her husband, where she works as a gymnastics coach at Eastern Suburbs Gymnastics club.
