= Li Na (diver) =

Chinese diver (born 1984)

Personal information
- Born: May 1, 1984 (age 42) Hefei, Anhui, People's Republic of China

Sport
- Country: People's Republic of China
- Sport: Diving
Medal record
Women's diving
Representing China
Olympic Games
Gold medal – first place	2000 Sydney	10m Platform Synchro
Silver medal – second place	2000 Sydney	10m Platform
Summer Universiade
Gold medal – first place	2003 Daegu	Team
Gold medal – first place	2003 Daegu	10 m platform
Bronze medal – third place	2005 İzmir	10 m platform
Asian Games
Silver medal – second place	1998 Bangkok	10m Platform
Silver medal – second place	2002 Busan	10m Platform

Li Na (Chinese: 李娜; pinyin: Lǐ Nà; born May 1, 1984, in Hefei, Anhui) is a Chinese diver who won a gold and silver medal at the 2000 Summer Olympics.
