= List of 2000 Summer Olympics medal winners =

The 2000 Summer Olympics were held in Sydney, Australia, from 15 September to 1 October 2000. 10,651 athletes from 199 National Olympic Committees (NOC) countries participated. The competition was made up of 300 events in 28 sports were held; 165 events were opened to men, 127 were opened to women and 10 were mixed events.

== Archery ==
Event	Gold	Silver	Bronze
Men's individual	Simon Fairweather; Australia	Vic Wunderle; United States	Wietse van Alten; Netherlands
Men's team	South Korea; Jang Yong-Ho; Kim Chung-tae; Oh Kyo-Moon	Italy; Matteo Bisiani; Ilario Di Buò; Michele Frangilli	United States; Butch Johnson; Rod White; Vic Wunderle
Women's individual	Yun Mi-Jin; South Korea	Kim Nam-Soon; South Korea	Kim Soo-Nyung; South Korea
Women's team	South Korea; Kim Nam-Soon; Kim Soo-Nyung; Yun Mi-Jin	Ukraine; Nataliya Burdeyna; Olena Sadovnycha; Kateryna Serdyuk	Germany; Barbara Mensing; Cornelia Pfohl; Sandra Wagner-Sachse

== Athletics ==
=== Track ===
==== Men's events ====
Event	Gold	Silver	Bronze
100 metres	Maurice Greene; United States	Ato Boldon; Trinidad and Tobago	Obadele Thompson; Barbados
200 metres	Konstantinos Kenteris; Greece	Darren Campbell; Great Britain	Ato Boldon; Trinidad and Tobago
400 metres	Michael Johnson; United States	Alvin Harrison; United States	Greg Haughton; Jamaica
800 metres	Nils Schumann; Germany	Wilson Kipketer; Denmark	Djabir Saïd-Guerni; Algeria
1500 metres	Noah Ngeny; Kenya	Hicham El Guerrouj; Morocco	Bernard Lagat; Kenya
5000 metres	Million Wolde; Ethiopia	Ali Saïdi-Sief; Algeria	Brahim Lahlafi; Morocco
10,000 metres	Haile Gebrselassie; Ethiopia	Paul Tergat; Kenya	Assefa Mezgebu; Ethiopia
110 metres hurdles	Anier García; Cuba	Terrence Trammell; United States	Mark Crear; United States
400 metres hurdles	Angelo Taylor; United States	Hadi Al-Somaily; Saudi Arabia	Llewellyn Herbert; South Africa
3000 metres steeplechase	Reuben Kosgei; Kenya	Wilson Boit Kipketer; Kenya	Ali Ezzine; Morocco
4 × 100 metres relay	United States; Jon Drummond; Bernard Williams; Brian Lewis; Maurice Greene; Tim Montgomery*; Kenneth Brokenburr*	Brazil; Vicente de Lima; Edson Ribeiro; André da Silva; Claudinei da Silva; Cláudio Souza*	Cuba; Luis Alberto Pérez-Rionda; Iván García; Freddy Mayola; José Ángel César
4 × 400 metres relay	Nigeria; Clement Chukwu; Jude Monye; Sunday Bada; Enefiok Udo-Obong; Nduka Awazie*; Fidelis Gadzama*	Jamaica; Michael Blackwood; Greg Haughton; Christopher Williams; Danny McFarlane; Sanjay Ayre*; Michael McDonald*	Bahamas; Avard Moncur; Troy McIntosh; Carl Oliver; Chris Brown; Timothy Munnings*

==== Women's events ====
Event	Gold	Silver	Bronze
100 metres	vacant	Ekaterini Thanou; Greece	Merlene Ottey; Jamaica
100 metres	vacant	Tayna Lawrence; Jamaica	Merlene Ottey; Jamaica
200 metres	Pauline Davis-Thompson; Bahamas	Susanthika Jayasinghe; Sri Lanka	Beverly McDonald; Jamaica
400 metres	Cathy Freeman; Australia	Lorraine Graham; Jamaica	Katharine Merry; Great Britain
800 metres	Maria de Lurdes Mutola; Mozambique	Stephanie Graf; Austria	Kelly Holmes; Great Britain
1500 metres	Nouria Mérah-Benida; Algeria	Violeta Beclea; Romania	Gabriela Szabo; Romania
5000 metres	Gabriela Szabo; Romania	Sonia O'Sullivan; Ireland	Gete Wami; Ethiopia
10,000 metres	Derartu Tulu; Ethiopia	Gete Wami; Ethiopia	Fernanda Ribeiro; Portugal
100 metres hurdles	Olga Shishigina; Kazakhstan	Glory Alozie; Nigeria	Melissa Morrison; United States
400 metres hurdles	Irina Privalova; Russia	Deon Hemmings; Jamaica	Nezha Bidouane; Morocco
4 × 100 metres relay	Bahamas; Savatheda Fynes; Chandra Sturrup; Pauline Davis-Thompson; Debbie Ferguson; Eldece Lewis*	Jamaica; Tayna Lawrence; Veronica Campbell; Beverly McDonald; Merlene Ottey; Merlene Frazer*	United States; Chryste Gaines; Torri Edwards; Nanceen Perry; Passion Richardson*
4 × 400 metres relay	United States; Jearl Miles Clark; Monique Hennagan; LaTasha Colander; Andrea Anderson*	Jamaica; Sandie Richards; Catherine Scott; Deon Hemmings; Lorraine Graham; Charmaine Howell*; Michelle Burgher*	Russia; Yuliya Sotnikova; Svetlana Goncharenko; Olga Kotlyarova; Irina Privalova; Natalya Nazarova*; Olesya Zykina*

=== Road ===
Event	Gold	Silver	Bronze
Men's 20 kilometres walk	Robert Korzeniowski; Poland	Noé Hernández Valentin; Mexico	Vladimir Andreyev; Russia
Men's 50 kilometres walk	Robert Korzeniowski; Poland	Aigars Fadejevs; Latvia	Joel Sánchez Guerrero; Mexico
Men's marathon	Gezahgne Abera; Ethiopia	Erick Wainaina; Kenya	Tesfaye Tola; Ethiopia
Women's 20 kilometres walk	Liping Wang; China	Kjersti Plätzer; Norway	María Vasco; Spain
Women's marathon	Naoko Takahashi; Japan	Lidia Șimon; Romania	Joyce Chepchumba; Kenya

=== Field ===
==== Men's events ====
Event	Gold	Silver	Bronze
high jump	Sergey Klyugin; Russia	Javier Sotomayor; Cuba	Abderrahmane Hammad; Algeria
long jump	Iván Pedroso; Cuba	Jai Taurima; Australia	Roman Shchurenko; Ukraine
triple jump	Jonathan Edwards; Great Britain	Yoel García; Cuba	Denis Kapustin; Russia
pole vault	Nick Hysong; United States	Lawrence Johnson; United States	Maksim Tarasov; Russia
shot put	Arsi Harju; Finland	Adam Nelson; United States	John Godina; United States
discus throw	Virgilijus Alekna; Lithuania	Lars Riedel; Germany	Frantz Kruger; South Africa
javelin throw	Jan Železný; Czech Republic	Steve Backley; Great Britain	Sergey Makarov; Russia
hammer throw	Szymon Ziółkowski; Poland	Nicola Vizzoni; Italy	Igor Astapkovich; Belarus
decathlon	Erki Nool; Estonia	Roman Šebrle; Czech Republic	Chris Huffins; United States

==== Women's events ====
Event	Gold	Silver	Bronze
high jump	Yelena Yelesina; Russia	Hestrie Cloete; South Africa	Kajsa Bergqvist; Sweden
high jump	Yelena Yelesina; Russia	Hestrie Cloete; South Africa	Oana Pantelimon; Romania
long jump	Heike Drechsler; Germany	Fiona May; Italy	Tatyana Kotova; Russia
triple jump	Tereza Marinova; Bulgaria	Tatyana Lebedeva; Russia	Olena Hovorova; Ukraine
pole vault	Stacy Dragila; United States	Tatiana Grigorieva; Australia	Vala Flosadóttir; Iceland
shot put	Yanina Karolchik; Belarus	Larisa Peleshenko; Russia	Astrid Kumbernuss; Germany
discus throw	Ellina Zvereva; Belarus	Anastasía Kelesídou; Greece	Iryna Yatchenko; Belarus
javelin throw	Trine Hattestad; Norway	Mirela Manjani-Tzelili; Greece	Osleidys Menéndez; Cuba
hammer throw	Kamila Skolimowska; Poland	Olga Kuzenkova; Russia	Kirsten Münchow; Germany
heptathlon	Denise Lewis; Great Britain	Yelena Prokhorova; Russia	Natallia Sazanovich; Belarus

* Athletes who participated in the heats only and received medals.

== Badminton ==
Event	Gold	Silver	Bronze
Men's singles	Ji Xinpeng; China	Hendrawan; Indonesia	Xia Xuanze; China
Women's singles	Gong Zhichao; China	Camilla Martin; Denmark	Ye Zhaoying; China
Men's doubles	Indonesia; Tony Gunawan; Candra Wijaya	South Korea; Lee Dong-soo; Yoo Yong-sung	South Korea; Ha Tae-Kwon; Kim Dong Moon
Women's doubles	China; Ge Fei; Gu Jun	China; Huang Nanyan; Yang Wei	China; Qin Yiyuan; Gao Ling
Mixed doubles	China; Zhang Jun; Gao Ling	Indonesia; Tri Kusharyanto; Minarti Timur	Great Britain; Simon Archer; Joanne Goode

== Baseball ==
Event	Gold	Silver	Bronze
Men's team	United States; Brent Abernathy; Kurt Ainsworth; Pat Borders; Sean Burroughs; John Cotton; Travis Dawkins; Adam Everett; Ryan Franklin; Chris George; Shane Heams; Marcus Jensen; Mike Kinkade; Rick Krivda; Doug Mientkiewicz; Mike Neill; Roy Oswalt; Jon Rauch; Anthony Sanders; Bobby Seay; Ben Sheets; Brad Wilkerson; Todd Williams; Ernie Young; Tim Young	Cuba; Omar Ajete; Yovany Aragon; Miguel Caldés; Danel Castro; José Contreras; Yobal Dueñas; Yasser Gómez; José Ibar; Orestes Kindelán; Pedro Luis Lazo; Omar Linares; Oscar Macías; Juan Manrique; Javier Méndez; Rolando Meriño; Germán Mesa; Antonio Pacheco Massó; Ariel Pestano; Gabriel Pierre; Maels Rodríguez; Antonio Scull; Luis Ulacia; Lázaro Valle; Norge Luis Vera	South Korea; Jang Sung-Ho; Chong Tae-Hyon; Chung Min-Tae; Jung Soo-Keun; Hong Sung-Heon; Jin Pil-jung; Kim Dong-Joo; Kim Han-Soo; Kim Ki-Tae; Kim Soo-Kyung; Kim Tae-gyun; Koo Dae-Sung; Lee Byung-Kyu; Lee Seung-Ho; Lee Seung-Yeop; Lim Chang-Yong; Lim Sun-Dong; Park Jae-Hong; Park Jin-Man; Park Jong-Ho; Park Kyung-Oan; Park Seok-Jin; Son Min-Han; Song Jin-Woo

== Basketball ==
Event	Gold	Silver	Bronze
Men's team	United States; Steve Smith; Gary Payton; Vince Carter; Ray Allen; Vin Baker; Kevin Garnett; Tim Hardaway; Allan Houston; Jason Kidd; Antonio McDyess; Alonzo Mourning; Shareef Abdur-Rahim	France; Jim Bilba; Yann Bonato; Makan Dioumassi; Laurent Foirest; Thierry Gadou; Cyril Julian; Crawford Palmer; Antoine Rigaudeau; Stéphane Risacher; Laurent Sciarra; Mustapha Sonko; Frédéric Weis	Lithuania; Gintaras Einikis; Saulius Štombergas; Eurelijus Žukauskas; Dainius Adomaitis; Šarūnas Jasikevičius; Kęstutis Marčiulionis; Tomas Masiulis; Darius Maskoliūnas; Ramūnas Šiškauskas; Darius Songaila; Mindaugas Timinskas; Andrius Giedraitis
Women's team	United States; Ruthie Bolton-Holifield; Teresa Edwards; Yolanda Griffith; Chamique Holdsclaw; Lisa Leslie; Nikki McCray; DeLisha Milton; Katie Smith; Dawn Staley; Sheryl Swoopes; Natalie Williams; Kara Wolters	Australia; Carla Boyd; Sandra Brondello; Trisha Fallon; Michelle Griffiths; Kristi Harrower; Jo Hill; Lauren Jackson; Annie la Fleur; Shelley Sandie; Rachael Sporn; Michele Timms; Jenny Whittle	Brazil; Janeth Arcain; Ilisaine David; Lilian Gonçalves; Helen Luz; Silvinha; Claudia Neves; Alessandra Oliveira; Adriana Pinto; Cintia Santos; Adriana Santos; Kelly Santos; Marta Sobral

== Boxing ==
Event	Gold	Silver	Bronze
Light flyweight (−48 kg)	Brahim Asloum; France	Rafael Lozano; Spain	Maikro Romero; Cuba
Light flyweight (−48 kg)	Brahim Asloum; France	Rafael Lozano; Spain	Kim Un-chol; North Korea
Flyweight (−51 kg)	Wijan Ponlid; Thailand	Bulat Jumadilov; Kazakhstan	Jérôme Thomas; France
Flyweight (−51 kg)	Wijan Ponlid; Thailand	Bulat Jumadilov; Kazakhstan	Vladimir Sidorenko; Ukraine
Bantamweight (−54 kg)	Guillermo Rigondeaux; Cuba	Raimkul Malakhbekov; Russia	Sergiy Danylchenko; Ukraine
Bantamweight (−54 kg)	Guillermo Rigondeaux; Cuba	Raimkul Malakhbekov; Russia	Clarence Vinson; United States
Featherweight (−57 kg)	Bekzat Sattarkhanov; Kazakhstan	Ricardo Juarez; United States	Tahar Tamsamani; Morocco
Featherweight (−57 kg)	Bekzat Sattarkhanov; Kazakhstan	Ricardo Juarez; United States	Kamil Djamaloudinov; Russia
Lightweight (−60 kg)	Mario Kindelán; Cuba	Andriy Kotelnyk; Ukraine	Cristián Bejarano; Mexico
Lightweight (−60 kg)	Mario Kindelán; Cuba	Andriy Kotelnyk; Ukraine	Alexandr Maletin; Russia
Light welterweight (−63.5 kg)	Mahammatkodir Abdoollayev; Uzbekistan	Ricardo Williams; United States	Mohamed Allalou; Algeria
Light welterweight (−63.5 kg)	Mahammatkodir Abdoollayev; Uzbekistan	Ricardo Williams; United States	Diógenes Luña; Cuba
Welterweight (−67 kg)	Oleg Saitov; Russia	Sergey Dotsenko; Ukraine	Vitalie Gruşac; Moldova
Welterweight (−67 kg)	Oleg Saitov; Russia	Sergey Dotsenko; Ukraine	Dorel Simion; Romania
Light middleweight (−71 kg)	Yermakhan Ibraimov; Kazakhstan	Marian Simion; Romania	Pornchai Thongburan; Thailand
Light middleweight (−71 kg)	Yermakhan Ibraimov; Kazakhstan	Marian Simion; Romania	Jermain Taylor; United States
Middleweight (−75 kg)	Jorge Gutiérrez; Cuba	Gaydarbek Gaydarbekov; Russia	Vugar Alakparov; Azerbaijan
Middleweight (−75 kg)	Jorge Gutiérrez; Cuba	Gaydarbek Gaydarbekov; Russia	Zsolt Erdei; Hungary
Light heavyweight (−81 kg)	Alexandre Lebziak; Russia	Rudolf Kraj; Czech Republic	Andriy Fedchuk; Ukraine
Light heavyweight (−81 kg)	Alexandre Lebziak; Russia	Rudolf Kraj; Czech Republic	Sergey Mihaylov; Uzbekistan
Heavyweight (−91 kg)	Félix Savón; Cuba	Sultan Ibragimov; Russia	Vladimer Tchanturia; Georgia
Heavyweight (−91 kg)	Félix Savón; Cuba	Sultan Ibragimov; Russia	Sebastian Köber; Germany
Super heavyweight (+91 kg)	Audley Harrison; Great Britain	Mukhtarkhan Dildabekov; Kazakhstan	Paolo Vidoz; Italy
Super heavyweight (+91 kg)	Audley Harrison; Great Britain	Mukhtarkhan Dildabekov; Kazakhstan	Rustam Saidov; Uzbekistan

== Canoeing ==
=== Slalom ===
Event	Gold	Silver	Bronze
Men's slalom C-1	Tony Estanguet; France	Michal Martikán; Slovakia	Juraj Minčík; Slovakia
Men's slalom C-2	Slovakia; Pavol Hochschorner; Peter Hochschorner	Poland; Krzysztof Kołomański; Michał Staniszewski	Czech Republic; Marek Jiras; Tomáš Máder
Men's slalom K-1	Thomas Schmidt; Germany	Paul Ratcliffe; Great Britain	Pierpaolo Ferrazzi; Italy
Women's slalom K-1	Štěpánka Hilgertová; Czech Republic	Brigitte Guibal; France	Anne-Lise Bardet; France

=== Sprint ===
Event	Gold	Silver	Bronze
Men's 500 m C-1	György Kolonics; Hungary	Maxim Opalev; Russia	Andreas Dittmer; Germany
Men's 1,000 m C-1	Andreas Dittmer; Germany	Ledis Balceiro; Cuba	Stephen Giles; Canada
Men's 500 m C-2	Hungary; Ferenc Novák; Imre Pulai	Poland; Daniel Jędraszko; Paweł Baraszkiewicz	Romania; Mitică Pricop; Florin Popescu
Men's 1,000 m C-2	Romania; Mitică Pricop; Florin Popescu	Cuba; Ibrahim Rojas; Leobaldo Pereira	Germany; Stefan Uteß; Lars Kober
Men's 500 m K-1	Knut Holmann; Norway	Petar Merkov; Bulgaria	Michael Kolganov; Israel
Men's 1,000 m K-1	Knut Holmann; Norway	Petar Merkov; Bulgaria	Tim Brabants; Great Britain
Men's 500 m K-2	Hungary; Zoltán Kammerer; Botond Storcz	Australia; Andrew Trim; Daniel Collins	Germany; Ronald Rauhe; Tim Wieskötter
Men's 1,000 m K-2	Italy; Antonio Rossi; Beniamino Bonomi	Sweden; Markus Oscarsson; Henrik Nilsson	Hungary; Krisztián Bártfai; Krisztián Veréb
Men's 1,000 m K-4	Hungary; Ákos Vereckei; Gábor Horváth; Zoltán Kammerer; Botond Storcz	Germany; Jan Schäfer; Mark Zabel; Björn Bach; Stefan Ulm	Poland; Grzegorz Kotowicz; Adam Seroczyński; Dariusz Białkowski; Marek Witkowski
Women's 500 m K-1	Josefa Idem; Italy	Caroline Brunet; Canada	Katrin Borchert; Australia
Women's 500 m K-2	Germany; Birgit Fischer; Katrin Wagner	Hungary; Katalin Kovács; Szilvia Szabó	Poland; Beata Sokołowska; Aneta Pastuszka
Women's 500 m K-4	Germany; Birgit Fischer; Manuela Mucke; Anett Schuck; Katrin Wagner	Hungary; Rita Kőbán; Katalin Kovács; Szilvia Szabó; Erzsébet Viski	Romania; Raluca Ioniță; Mariana Limbău; Elena Radu; Sanda Toma

== Cycling ==
=== Road ===
Event	Gold	Silver	Bronze
Men's road race	Jan Ullrich; Germany	Alexander Vinokourov; Kazakhstan	Andreas Klöden; Germany
Men's time trial	Viatcheslav Ekimov; Russia	Jan Ullrich; Germany	Vacant
Women's road race	Leontien Zijlaard; Netherlands	Hanka Kupfernagel; Germany	Diana Žiliūtė; Lithuania
Women's time trial	Leontien Zijlaard; Netherlands	Mari Holden; United States	Jeannie Longo-Ciprelli; France

=== Track ===
Event	Gold	Silver	Bronze
Men's Keirin	Florian Rousseau; France	Gary Neiwand; Australia	Jens Fiedler; Germany
Men's Madison	Australia; Brett Aitken; Scott McGrory	Belgium; Etienne De Wilde; Matthew Gilmore	Italy; Silvio Martinello; Marco Villa
Men's points race	Juan Llaneras; Spain	Milton Wynants; Uruguay	Alexey Markov; Russia
Men's pursuit	Robert Bartko; Germany	Jens Lehmann; Germany	Bradley McGee; Australia
Men's team pursuit	Germany; Guido Fulst; Robert Bartko; Daniel Becke; Jens Lehmann	Ukraine; Sergiy Chernyavskyy; Sergiy Matveyev; Alexander Symonenko; Oleksandr Fedenko	Great Britain; Paul Manning; Chris Newton; Bryan Steel; Bradley Wiggins
Men's sprint	Marty Nothstein; United States	Florian Rousseau; France	Jens Fiedler; Germany
Men's team sprint	France; Florian Rousseau; Arnaud Tournant; Laurent Gané	Great Britain; Chris Hoy; Craig MacLean; Jason Queally	Australia; Gary Neiwand; Sean Eadie; Darryn Hill
Men's time trial	Jason Queally; Great Britain	Stefan Nimke; Germany	Shane Kelly; Australia
Women's points race	Antonella Bellutti; Italy	Leontien Zijlaard; Netherlands	Olga Slioussareva; Russia
Women's pursuit	Leontien Zijlaard; Netherlands	Marion Clignet; France	Yvonne McGregor; Great Britain
Women's sprint	Félicia Ballanger; France	Oksana Grishina; Russia	Iryna Yanovych; Ukraine
Women's time trial	Félicia Ballanger; France	Michelle Ferris; Australia	Jiang Cuihua; China

=== Mountain bike (MTB) ===
Event	Gold	Silver	Bronze
Men's cross-country	Miguel Martinez; France	Filip Meirhaeghe; Belgium	Christoph Sauser; Switzerland
Women's cross-country	Paola Pezzo; Italy	Barbara Blatter; Switzerland	Margarita Fullana; Spain

== Diving ==
=== Men's events ===
Event	Gold	Silver	Bronze
3 m springboard	Xiong Ni; China	Fernando Platas; Mexico	Dmitri Sautin; Russia
10 m platform	Tian Liang; China	Hu Jia; China	Dmitri Sautin; Russia
Synchronized 3 m springboard	China; Xiong Ni; Xiao Hailiang	Russia; Dmitri Sautin; Alexandre Dobroskok	Australia; Robert Newbery; Dean Pullar
Synchronized 10 m platform	Russia; Dmitri Sautin; Igor Lukashin	China; Hu Jia; Tian Liang	Germany; Jan Hempel; Heiko Meyer

=== Women's events ===
Event	Gold	Silver	Bronze
3 m springboard	Fu Mingxia; China	Guo Jingjing; China	Dörte Lindner; Germany
10 m platform	Laura Wilkinson; United States	Li Na; China	Anne Montminy; Canada
Synchronized 3 m springboard	Russia; Vera Ilina; Ioulia Pakhalina	China; Fu Mingxia; Guo Jingjing	Ukraine; Ganna Sorokina; Olena Zhupina
Synchronized 10 m platform	China; Li Na; Sang Xue	Canada; Émilie Heymans; Anne Montminy	Australia; Rebecca Gilmore; Loudy Tourky

== Equestrian ==
Event	Gold	Silver	Bronze
Individual dressage	Anky van Grunsven; Netherlands	Isabell Werth; Germany	Ulla Salzgeber; Germany
Team dressage	Germany; Isabell Werth; Alexandra Simons de Ridder; Nadine Capellmann; Ulla Salzgeber	Netherlands; Anky van Grunsven; Ellen Bontje; Arjen Teeuwissen; Coby van Baalen	United States; Robert Dover; Susan Blinks; Guenter Seidel; Christine Traurig
Individual eventing	David O'Connor; United States	Andrew Hoy; Australia	Mark Todd; New Zealand
Team eventing	Australia; Phillip Dutton; Andrew Hoy; Stuart Tinney; Matthew Ryan	Great Britain; Ian Stark; Jeanette Brakewell; Pippa Funnell; Leslie Law	United States; Nina Fout; Karen O'Connor; David O'Connor; Linden Wiesman
Individual jumping	Jeroen Dubbeldam; Netherlands	Albert Voorn; Netherlands	Khaled Al-Eid; Saudi Arabia
Team jumping	Germany; Ludger Beerbaum; Lars Nieberg; Marcus Ehning; Otto Becker	Switzerland; Markus Fuchs; Beat Maendli; Lesley McNaught; Willi Melliger	Brazil; Rodrigo Pessoa; Luiz Felipe De Azevedo; Álvaro Miranda Neto; Andre Johannpeter

== Fencing ==
Event	Gold	Silver	Bronze
Men's individual épée	Pavel Kolobkov; Russia	Hughes Obry; France	Lee Sang-Ki; South Korea
Men's team épée	Italy; Angelo Mazzoni; Paolo Milanoli; Maurizio Randazzo; Alfredo Rota	France; Jean-François di Martino; Hughes Obry; Éric Srecki	Cuba; Nelson Loyola; Carlos Pedroso; Ivan Trevejo
Women's individual épée	Tímea Nagy; Hungary	Gianna Hablützel-Bürki; Switzerland	Laura Flessel-Colovic; France
Women's team épée	Russia; Karina Aznavourian; Oxana Ermakova; Tatiana Logounova; Maria Mazina	Switzerland; Gianna Hablützel-Bürki; Sophie Lamon; Diana Romagnoli	China; Li Na; Liang Qin; Yang Shaoqi
Men's individual foil	Kim Young-Ho; South Korea	Ralf Bissdorf; Germany	Dmitriy Shevchenko; Russia
Men's team foil	France; Jean-Noel Ferrari; Brice Guyart; Patrice Lhotellier; Lionel Plumenail	China; Dong Zhaozhi; Wang Haibin; Ye Chong	Italy; Daniele Crosta; Gabriele Magni; Salvatore Sanzo; Matteo Zennaro
Women's individual foil	Valentina Vezzali; Italy	Rita Koenig; Germany	Giovanna Trillini; Italy
Women's team foil	Italy; Diana Bianchedi; Giovanna Trillini; Valentina Vezzali	Poland; Sylwia Gruchała; Magdalena Mroczkiewicz; Anna Rybicka; Barbara Wolnicka	Germany; Sabine Bau; Rita Koenig; Monika Weber
Men's individual sabre	Mihai Claudiu Covaliu; Romania	Mathieu Gourdain; France	Wiradech Kothny; Germany
Men's team sabre	Russia; Sergey Sharikov; Aleksey Frosin; Stanislav Pozdnyakov	France; Mathieu Gourdain; Julien Pillet; Cédric Séguin; Damien Touya	Germany; Dennis Bauer; Wiradech Kothny; Alexander Weber

== Field hockey ==
Event	Gold	Silver	Bronze
Men's team	Netherlands; Ronald Jansen; Erik Jazet; Wouter van Pelt; Bram Lomans; Diederik van Weel; Stephan Veen; Jeroen Delmee; Jacques Brinkman; Remco van Wijk; Teun de Nooijer; Jaap-Derk Buma; Peter Windt; Sander van der Weide; Piet-Hein Geeris; Marten Eikelboom	South Korea; Kim Yoon; Ji Seong-Hwan; Seo Jong-Ho; Kim Chel-Hwan; Kim Yong-Bae; Han Hyung-Bae; Kim Kyung-Seok; Kim Jung-Chul; Song Seung-Tae; Kang Keon-Wook; Hwang Jong-Hyun; Lim Jung-Woo; Jeon Jong-Ha; Jeon Hong-Kwon; Yeo Woon-Kon; Lim Jong-Chun	Australia; Michael Brennan; Adam Commens; Jason Duff; Troy Elder; James Elmer; Damon Diletti; Lachlan Dreher; Paul Gaudoin; Jay Stacy; Daniel Sproule; Stephen Davies; Michael York; Craig Victory; Stephen Holt; Matthew Wells; Brent Livermore
Women's team	Australia; Alyson Annan; Juliet Haslam; Alison Peek; Claire Mitchell-Taverner; Kate Starre; Kate Allen; Lisa Carruthers; Rechelle Hawkes; Clover Maitland; Rachel Imison; Angie Skirving; Julie Towers; Renita Farrell; Jenn Morris; Katrina Powell; Nikki Hudson	Argentina; Mariela Antoniska; Agustina García; Magdalena Aicega; María Paz Ferrari; Anabel Gambero; Ayelén Stepnik; Inés Arrondo; Luciana Aymar; Vanina Oneto; Jorgelina Rimoldi; Karina Masotta; Paola Vukojicic; Laura Maiztegui; Mercedes Margalot; María de la Paz Hernández; Cecilia Rognoni	Netherlands; Julie Deiters; Fatima Moreira de Melo; Hanneke Smabers; Dillianne van den Boogaard; Margje Teeuwen; Mijntje Donners; Ageeth Boomgaardt; Myrna Veenstra; Minke Smabers; Carole Thate; Fleur van de Kieft; Minke Booij; Daphne Touw

== Football ==
Event	Gold	Silver	Bronze
Men's team	Cameroon; Samuel Eto'o; Serge Mimpo; Clément Beaud; Aaron Nguimbat; Joël Epalle; Modeste M'bami; Patrice Abanda; Nicolas Alnoudji; Daniel Bekono; Serge Branco; Lauren; Carlos Kameni; Patrick Mboma; Albert Meyong; Daniel Ngom Kome; Geremi; Jean-Joël Perrier-Doumbé; Patrick Suffo; Pierre Womé	Spain; David Albelda; Iván Amaya; Miguel Ángel Angulo; Daniel Aranzubia; Joan Capdevila; Jordi Ferrón; Gabriel García; Xavier Hernández; Jesús María Lacruz; Albert Luque; Carlos Marchena; Felip Ortiz; Carles Puyol; José María Romero; Ismael Ruiz; Raúl Tamudo; Antonio Velamazán; Unai Vergara	Chile; Pedro Reyes; Nelson Tapia; Iván Zamorano; Javier di Gregorio; Cristian Álvarez; Francisco Arrué; Pablo Contreras; Sebastián González; David Henríquez; Manuel Ibarra; Claudio Maldonado; Reinaldo Navia; Rodrigo Núñez; Rafael Olarra; Patricio Ormazábal; David Pizarro; Rodrigo Tello; Mauricio Rojas
Women's team	Norway; Gro Espeseth; Bente Nordby; Marianne Pettersen; Hege Riise; Kristin Bekkevold; Ragnhild Gulbrandsen; Solveig Gulbrandsen; Margunn Haugenes; Ingeborg Hovland; Christine Bøe Jensen; Silje Jørgensen; Monica Knudsen; Gøril Kringen; Unni Lehn; Dagny Mellgren; Anita Rapp; Brit Sandaune; Bente Kvitland	United States; Brandi Chastain; Joy Fawcett; Julie Foudy; Mia Hamm; Kristine Lilly; Tiffeny Milbrett; Carla Overbeck; Cindy Parlow; Briana Scurry; Lorrie Fair; Michelle French; Shannon MacMillan; Siri Mullinix; Christie Pearce; Nikki Serlenga; Danielle Slaton; Kate Sobrero; Sara Whalen	Germany; Ariane Hingst; Melanie Hoffmann; Steffi Jones; Renate Lingor; Maren Meinert; Sandra Minnert; Claudia Müller; Birgit Prinz; Silke Rottenberg; Kerstin Stegemann; Bettina Wiegmann; Tina Wunderlich; Nicole Brandebusemeyer; Nadine Angerer; Doris Fitschen; Jeannette Götte; Stefanie Gottschlich; Inka Grings

== Gymnastics ==
=== Artistic ===
==== Men's events ====
Event	Gold	Silver	Bronze
individual all-around	Alexei Nemov; Russia	Yang Wei; China	Oleksandr Beresch; Ukraine
team all-around	China; Yang Wei; Zheng Lihui; Li Xiaopeng; Xing Aowei; Huang Xu; Xiao Junfeng	Ukraine; Oleksandr Beresch; Olexander Svitlichni; Roman Zozulya; Valery Goncharov; Valery Pereshkura; Ruslan Mezentsev	Russia; Alexei Nemov; Maxim Aleshin; Alexei Bondarenko; Nikolai Kryukov; Yevgeni Podgorny; Dmitri Drevin
floor exercise	Igors Vihrovs; Latvia	Alexei Nemov; Russia	Yordan Yovchev; Bulgaria
horizontal bar	Alexei Nemov; Russia	Benjamin Varonian; France	Lee Joo-hyung; South Korea
parallel bars	Li Xiaopeng; China	Lee Joo-Hyung; South Korea	Alexei Nemov; Russia
pommel horse	Marius Urzică; Romania	Eric Poujade; France	Alexei Nemov; Russia
rings	Szilveszter Csollány; Hungary	Dimosthenis Tampakos; Greece	Yordan Yovchev; Bulgaria
vault	Gervasio Deferr; Spain	Alexei Bondarenko; Russia	Leszek Blanik; Poland

==== Women's events ====
Event	Gold	Silver	Bronze
individual all-around	Simona Amânar; Romania	Maria Olaru; Romania	Liu Xuan; China
team all-around	Romania; Simona Amânar; Loredana Boboc; Andreea Isărescu; Maria Olaru; Claudia Presăcan; Andreea Răducan	Russia; Yekaterina Lobaznyuk; Svetlana Khorkina; Anastasiya Kolesnikova; Elena Produnova; Anna Chepeleva; Elena Zamolodchikova	United States; Amy Chow; Jamie Dantzscher; Dominique Dawes; Kristin Maloney; Elise Ray; Tasha Schwikert
balance beam	Liu Xuan; China	Yekaterina Lobaznyuk; Russia	Elena Produnova; Russia
floor exercise	Elena Zamolodchikova; Russia	Svetlana Khorkina; Russia	Simona Amânar; Romania
uneven bars	Svetlana Khorkina; Russia	Ling Jie; China	Yang Yun; China
vault	Elena Zamolodchikova; Russia	Andreea Răducan; Romania	Yekaterina Lobaznyuk; Russia

=== Rhythmic ===
Event	Gold	Silver	Bronze
individual all-around	Yulia Barsukova; Russia	Yulia Raskina; Belarus	Alina Kabaeva; Russia
team all-around	Russia; Irina Belova; Yelena Chalamova; Natalia Lavrova; Mariya Netesova; Vyera Shimanskaya; Irina Zilber	Belarus; Tatyana Ananko; Tatyana Belan; Anna Glazkova; Irina Ilyenkova; Maria Lazuk; Olga Puzhevich	Greece; Eirini Aindili; Evangelia Christodoulou; Maria Georgatou; Zacharoula Karyami; Charikleia Pantazi; Anna Pollatou

=== Trampoline ===
Event	Gold	Silver	Bronze
Men's	Alexander Moskalenko; Russia	Ji Wallace; Australia	Mathieu Turgeon; Canada
Women's	Irina Karavaeva; Russia	Oxana Tsyhuleva; Ukraine	Karen Cockburn; Canada

== Handball ==
Event	Gold	Silver	Bronze
Men's team	Russia; Dmitry Filippov; Vyacheslav Gorpishin; Oleg Khodkov; Eduard Koksharov; Denis Krivoshlykov; Vasily Kudinov; Stanislav Kulinchenko; Dmitry Kuzelev; Andrey Lavrov; Igor Lavrov; Sergey Pogorelov; Pavel Sukosyan; Dmitri Torgovanov; Aleksandr Tuchkin; Lev Voronin	Sweden; Magnus Andersson; Martin Boquist; Martin Frändesjö; Mathias Franzén; Peter Gentzel; Andreas Larsson; Ola Lindgren; Stefan Lövgren; Staffan Olsson; Johan Petersson; Tomas Svensson; Tomas Sivertsson; Pierre Thorsson; Ljubomir Vranjes; Magnus Wislander	Spain; David Barrufet; Talant Duyshebaev; Mateo Garralda; Rafael Guijosa; Demetrio Lozano; Enric Masip; Jordi Nuñez; Jesús Olalla; Juan Pérez; Xavier O'Callaghan; Antonio Carlos Ortega; Antonio Ugalde; Iñaki Urdangarín; Alberto Urdiales; Andrei Xepkin
Women's team	Denmark; Lene Rantala; Camilla Andersen; Tina Bøttzau; Janne Kolling; Tonje Kjærgaard; Karen Brødsgaard; Katrine Fruelund; Maja Grønbæk; Christina Hansen; Anette Hoffmann; Lotte Kiærskou; Karin Mortensen; Anja Nielsen; Rikke Petersen; Mette Vestergaard	Hungary; Beatrix Balogh; Rita Deli; Ágnes Farkas; Andrea Farkas; Anikó Kántor; Beatrix Kökény; Anita Kulcsár; Dóra Lőwy; Anikó Nagy; Ildikó Pádár; Katalin Pálinger; Krisztina Pigniczki; Bojana Radulovics; Judith Simics; Beáta Siti	Norway; Kristine Duvholt; Trine Haltvik; Heidi Tjugum; Susann Goksør Bjerkrheim; Ann Cathrin Eriksen; Kjersti Grini; Elisabeth Hilmo; Mia Hundvin; Tonje Larsen; Cecilie Leganger; Jeanette Nilsen; Marianne Rokne; Birgitte Sættem; Monica Sandve; Else-Marthe Sørlie

== Judo ==
=== Men's events ===
Event	Gold	Silver	Bronze
Extra lightweight (−60 kg)	Tadahiro Nomura; Japan	Jung Bu-Kyung; South Korea	Manolo Poulot; Cuba
Extra lightweight (−60 kg)	Tadahiro Nomura; Japan	Jung Bu-Kyung; South Korea	Aidyn Smagulov; Kyrgyzstan
Half lightweight (−66 kg)	Hüseyin Özkan; Turkey	Larbi Benboudaoud; France	Girolamo Giovinazzo; Italy
Half lightweight (−66 kg)	Hüseyin Özkan; Turkey	Larbi Benboudaoud; France	Giorgi Vazagashvili; Georgia
Lightweight (−73 kg)	Giuseppe Maddaloni; Italy	Tiago Camilo; Brazil	Anatoly Laryukov; Belarus
Lightweight (−73 kg)	Giuseppe Maddaloni; Italy	Tiago Camilo; Brazil	Vsevolods Zeļonijs; Latvia
Half middleweight (−81 kg)	Makoto Takimoto; Japan	Cho In-Chul; South Korea	Nuno Delgado; Portugal
Half middleweight (−81 kg)	Makoto Takimoto; Japan	Cho In-Chul; South Korea	Aleksei Budõlin; Estonia
Middleweight (−90 kg)	Mark Huizinga; Netherlands	Carlos Honorato; Brazil	Frédéric Demontfaucon; France
Middleweight (−90 kg)	Mark Huizinga; Netherlands	Carlos Honorato; Brazil	Ruslan Mashurenko; Ukraine
Half heavyweight (−100 kg)	Kosei Inoue; Japan	Nicolas Gill; Canada	Yuri Stepkine; Russia
Half heavyweight (−100 kg)	Kosei Inoue; Japan	Nicolas Gill; Canada	Stéphane Traineau; France
Heavyweight (+100 kg)	David Douillet; France	Shinichi Shinohara; Japan	Indrek Pertelson; Estonia
Heavyweight (+100 kg)	David Douillet; France	Shinichi Shinohara; Japan	Tamerlan Tmenov; Russia

=== Women's events ===
Event	Gold	Silver	Bronze
Extra lightweight (−48 kg)	Ryoko Tamura; Japan	Lioubov Brouletova; Russia	Anna-Maria Gradante; Germany
Extra lightweight (−48 kg)	Ryoko Tamura; Japan	Lioubov Brouletova; Russia	Ann Simons; Belgium
Half lightweight (−52 kg)	Legna Verdecia; Cuba	Noriko Narazaki; Japan	Kye Sun-Hi; North Korea
Half lightweight (−52 kg)	Legna Verdecia; Cuba	Noriko Narazaki; Japan	Liu Yuxiang; China
Lightweight (−57 kg)	Isabel Fernández; Spain	Driulis González; Cuba	Kie Kusakabe; Japan
Lightweight (−57 kg)	Isabel Fernández; Spain	Driulis González; Cuba	Maria Pekli; Australia
Half middleweight (−63 kg)	Séverine Vandenhende; France	Li Shufang; China	Gella Vandecaveye; Belgium
Half middleweight (−63 kg)	Séverine Vandenhende; France	Li Shufang; China	Jung Sung-Sook; South Korea
Middleweight (−70 kg)	Sibelis Veranes; Cuba	Kate Howey; Great Britain	Cho Min-Sun; South Korea
Middleweight (−70 kg)	Sibelis Veranes; Cuba	Kate Howey; Great Britain	Ylenia Scapin; Italy
Half heavyweight (−78 kg)	Tang Lin; China	Céline Lebrun; France	Simona Richter; Romania
Half heavyweight (−78 kg)	Tang Lin; China	Céline Lebrun; France	Emanuela Pierantozzi; Italy
Heavyweight (+78 kg)	Yuan Hua; China	Daima Beltrán; Cuba	Kim Seon-Young; South Korea
Heavyweight (+78 kg)	Yuan Hua; China	Daima Beltrán; Cuba	Mayumi Yamashita; Japan

== Modern pentathlon ==
Event	Gold	Silver	Bronze
Men's	Dmitri Svatkovsky; Russia	Gábor Balogh; Hungary	Pavel Dovgal; Belarus
Women's	Stephanie Cook; Great Britain	Emily de Riel; United States	Kate Allenby; Great Britain

== Rowing ==
=== Men's events ===
Event	Gold	Silver	Bronze
single sculls	Rob Waddell; New Zealand	Xeno Müller; Switzerland	Marcel Hacker; Germany
double sculls	Slovenia; Luka Špik; Iztok Čop	Norway; Olaf Tufte; Fredrik Bekken	Italy; Giovanni Calabrese; Nicola Sartori
lightweight double sculls	Poland; Tomasz Kucharski; Robert Sycz	Italy; Elia Luini; Leonardo Pettinari	France; Pascal Touron; Thibaud Chapelle
quadruple sculls	Italy; Agostino Abbagnale; Alessio Sartori; Rossano Galtarossa; Simone Raineri	Netherlands; Jochem Verberne; Dirk Lippits; Diederik Simon; Michiel Bartman	Germany; Marco Geisler; Andreas Hajek; Stephan Volkert; André Willms
coxless pair	France; Michel Andrieux; Jean-Christophe Rolland	United States; Ted Murphy; Sebastian Bea	Australia; Matthew Long; James Tomkins
coxless four	Great Britain; James Cracknell; Steve Redgrave; Tim Foster; Matthew Pinsent	Italy; Valter Molea; Riccardo Dei Rossi; Lorenzo Carboncini; Carlo Mornati	Australia; James Stewart; Ben Dodwell; Geoff Stewart; Bo Hanson
lightweight coxless four	France; Laurent Porchier; Jean-Christophe Bette; Yves Hocdé; Xavier Dorfman	Australia; Simon Burgess; Anthony Edwards; Darren Balmforth; Robert Richards	Denmark; Søren Madsen; Thomas Ebert; Eskild Ebbesen; Victor Feddersen
eight	Great Britain; Andrew Lindsay; Ben Hunt-Davis; Simon Dennis; Louis Attrill; Luka Grubor; Kieran West; Fred Scarlett; Steve Trapmore; Rowley Douglas (cox)	Australia; Christian Ryan; Alastair Gordon; Nick Porzig; Rob Jahrling; Mike McKay; Stuart Welch; Daniel Burke; Jaime Fernandez; Brett Hayman (cox)	Croatia; Igor Francetić; Tihomir Franković; Tomislav Smoljanović; Nikša Skelin; Siniša Skelin; Krešimir Čuljak; Igor Boraska; Branimir Vujević; Silvijo Petriško (cox)

=== Women's events ===
Event	Gold	Silver	Bronze
single sculls	Ekaterina Karsten; Belarus	Rumyana Neykova; Bulgaria	Katrin Rutschow-Stomporowski; Germany
double sculls	Germany; Jana Thieme; Kathrin Boron	Netherlands; Pieta van Dishoeck; Eeke van Nes	Lithuania; Birutė Šakickienė; Kristina Poplavskaja
lightweight double sculls	Romania; Constanța Burcică; Angela Alupei	Germany; Valerie Viehoff; Claudia Blasberg	United States; Christine Collins; Sarah Garner
quadruple sculls	Germany; Manja Kowalski; Meike Evers; Manuela Lutze; Kerstin Kowalski	Great Britain; Guin Batten; Gillian Lindsay; Katherine Grainger; Miriam Batten	Russia; Oksana Dorodnova; Irina Fedotova; Yuliya Levina; Larisa Merk
coxless pair	Romania; Georgeta Damian; Doina Ignat	Australia; Rachael Taylor; Kate Slatter	United States; Melissa Ryan; Karen Kraft
eight	Romania; Georgeta Damian; Viorica Susanu; Ioana Olteanu; Veronica Cochela; Maria Magdalena Dumitrache; Elisabeta Lipă; Liliana Gafencu; Doina Ignat; Elena Georgescu (cox)	Netherlands; Anneke Venema; Carin ter Beek; Nelleke Penninx; Pieta van Dishoeck; Eeke van Nes; Tessa Appeldoorn; Marieke Westerhof; Elien Meijer; Martijntje Quik (cox)	Canada; Heather McDermid; Heather Davis; Dorota Urbaniak; Theresa Luke; Emma Robinson; Alison Korn; Laryssa Biesenthal; Buffy Alexander; Lesley Thompson (cox)

== Sailing ==
Event	Gold	Silver	Bronze
Men's sailboard	Christoph Sieber; Austria	Carlos Espinola; Argentina	Aaron McIntosh; New Zealand
Women's sailboard	Alessandra Sensini; Italy	Amelie Lux; Germany	Barbara Kendall; New Zealand
Finn	Iain Percy; Great Britain	Luca Devoti; Italy	Fredrik Lööf; Sweden
Europe	Shirley Robertson; Great Britain	Margriet Matthijsse; Netherlands	Serena Amato; Argentina
Men's 470	Australia; Tom King; Mark Turnbull	United States; Paul Foerster; Robert Merrick	Argentina; Juan de la Fuente; Javier Conte
Women's 470	Australia; Jenny Armstrong; Belinda Stowell	United States; J. J. Isler; Sarah Glaser	Ukraine; Ruslana Taran; Olena Pakholchyk
Star	United States; Mark Reynolds; Magnus Liljedahl	Great Britain; Ian Walker; Mark Covell	Brazil; Torben Grael; Marcelo Ferreira
Soling	Denmark; Jesper Bank; Henrik Blakskjær; Thomas Jacobsen	Germany; Jochen Schümann; Gunnar Bahr; Ingo Borkowski	Norway; Paul Davis; Herman Horn Johannessen; Espen Stokkeland
Laser	Ben Ainslie; Great Britain	Robert Scheidt; Brazil	Michael Blackburn; Australia
49er	Finland; Jyrki Järvi; Thomas Johanson	Great Britain; Ian Barker; Simon Hiscocks	United States; Jonathan McKee; Charlie McKee
Tornado	Austria; Roman Hagara; Hans Peter Steinacher	Australia; John Forbes; Darren Bundock	Germany; Roland Gäbler; René Schwall

== Shooting ==
=== Men's events ===
Event	Gold	Silver	Bronze
air pistol	Franck Dumoulin; France	Wang Yifu; China	Igor Basinski; Belarus
air rifle	Cai Yalin; China	Artem Khadjibekov; Russia	Yevgeni Aleinikov; Russia
rifle prone	Jonas Edman; Sweden	Torben Grimmel; Denmark	Sergei Martynov; Belarus
rifle three positions	Rajmond Debevec; Slovenia	Juha Hirvi; Finland	Harald Stenvaag; Norway
pistol	Tanyu Kiryakov; Bulgaria	Igor Basinski; Belarus	Martin Tenk; Czech Republic
rapid fire pistol	Sergei Alifirenko; Russia	Michel Ansermet; Switzerland	Iulian Raicea; Romania
Trap	Michael Diamond; Australia	Ian Peel; Great Britain	Giovanni Pellielo; Italy
Double trap	Richard Faulds; Great Britain	Russell Mark; Australia	Fehaid Al Deehani; Kuwait
Skeet	Mykola Milchev; Ukraine	Petr Málek; Czech Republic	James Graves; United States
running target	Yang Ling; China	Oleg Moldovan; Moldova	Niu Zhiyuan; China

=== Women's events ===
Event	Gold	Silver	Bronze
air rifle	Nancy Johnson; United States	Kang Cho-hyun; South Korea	Gao Jing; China
air pistol	Tao Luna; China	Jasna Šekarić; FR Yugoslavia	Annemarie Forder; Australia
pistol	Mariya Grozdeva; Bulgaria	Tao Luna; China	Lalita Yauhleuskaya; Belarus
rifle three positions	Renata Mauer; Poland	Tatiana Goldobina; Russia	Maria Feklistova; Russia
Trap	Daina Gudzinevičiūtė; Lithuania	Delphine Racinet; France	Gao E China
Double trap	Pia Hansen; Sweden	Deborah Gelisio; Italy	Kim Rhode; United States
Skeet	Zemfira Meftahatdinova; Azerbaijan	Svetlana Demina; Russia	Diána Igaly; Hungary

== Softball ==
Event	Gold	Silver	Bronze
Women's team	United States; Laura Berg; Lisa Fernandez; Lori Harrigan; Michele Smith; Christie Ambrosi; Jennifer Brundage; Crystl Bustos; Sheila Cornell; Danielle Henderson; Jennifer McFalls; Stacey Nuveman; Leah O'Brien; Dot Richardson; Michelle Venturella; Christa Lee Williams	Japan; Misako Ando; Yumiko Fujii; Taeko Ishikawa; Kazue Ito; Yoshimi Kobayashi; Shiori Koseki; Mariko Masubuchi; Naomi Matsumoto; Emi Naito; Haruka Saito; Juri Takayama; Hiroko Tamoto; Reika Utsugi; Miyo Yamada; Noriko Yamaji	Australia; Joanne Brown; Kerry Dienelt; Peta Edebone; Tanya Harding; Melanie Roche; Natalie Ward; Brooke Wilkins; Sandra Allen; Sue Fairhurst; Selina Follas; Fiona Hanes; Kelly Hardie; Sally McDermid; Simmone Morrow; Natalie Titcume

== Swimming ==
=== Men's events ===
Event	Gold	Silver	Bronze
50 m freestyle	Anthony Ervin; United States	none	Pieter van den Hoogenband; Netherlands
50 m freestyle	Gary Hall Jr. United States	none	Pieter van den Hoogenband; Netherlands
100 m freestyle	Pieter van den Hoogenband; Netherlands	Alexander Popov; Russia	Gary Hall Jr. United States
200 m freestyle	Pieter van den Hoogenband; Netherlands	Ian Thorpe; Australia	Massimiliano Rosolino; Italy
400 m freestyle	Ian Thorpe; Australia	Massimiliano Rosolino; Italy	Klete Keller; United States
1,500 m freestyle	Grant Hackett; Australia	Kieren Perkins; Australia	Chris Thompson; United States
100 m backstroke	Lenny Krayzelburg; United States	Matt Welsh; Australia	Stev Theloke; Germany
200 m backstroke	Lenny Krayzelburg; United States	Aaron Peirsol; United States	Matt Welsh; Australia
100 m breaststroke	Domenico Fioravanti; Italy	Ed Moses; United States	Roman Sloudnov; Russia
200 m breaststroke	Domenico Fioravanti; Italy	Terence Parkin; South Africa	Davide Rummolo; Italy
100 m butterfly	Lars Frölander; Sweden	Michael Klim; Australia	Geoff Huegill; Australia
200 m butterfly	Tom Malchow; United States	Denys Sylantyev; Ukraine	Justin Norris; Australia
200 m individual medley	Massimiliano Rosolino; Italy	Tom Dolan; United States	Tom Wilkens; United States
400 m individual medley	Tom Dolan; United States	Erik Vendt; United States	Curtis Myden; Canada
4 × 100 m freestyle relay	Australia; Ian Thorpe; Ashley Callus; Chris Fydler; Michael Klim; Todd Pearson*; Adam Pine*	United States; Neil Walker; Anthony Ervin; Gary Hall Jr. Jason Lezak; Scott Tucker*; Josh Davis*	Brazil; Edvaldo Valério; Gustavo Borges; Carlos Jayme; Fernando Scherer
4 × 200 m freestyle relay	Australia; Todd Pearson; Ian Thorpe; Bill Kirby; Michael Klim; Grant Hackett*; Daniel Kowalski*	United States; Jamie Rauch; Josh Davis; Scott Goldblatt; Klete Keller; Nate Dusing*; Chad Carvin*	Netherlands; Martijn Zuijdweg; Johan Kenkhuis; Pieter van den Hoogenband; Marcel Wouda; Mark van der Zijden*
4 × 100 m medley relay	United States; Lenny Krayzelburg; Ed Moses; Ian Crocker; Gary Hall Jr. Neil Walker*; Tommy Hannan*; Jason Lezak*	Australia; Matt Welsh; Regan Harrison; Geoff Huegill; Michael Klim; Josh Watson*; Ryan Mitchell*; Adam Pine*; Ian Thorpe*	Germany; Stev Theloke; Jens Kruppa; Thomas Rupprath; Torsten Spanneberg

=== Women's ===
Event	Gold	Silver	Bronze
50 m freestyle	Inge de Bruijn; Netherlands	Therese Alshammar; Sweden	Dara Torres; United States
100 mefreestyle	Inge de Bruijn; Netherlands	Therese Alshammar; Sweden	Dara Torres; United States
100 mefreestyle	Inge de Bruijn; Netherlands	Therese Alshammar; Sweden	Jenny Thompson; United States
200 m freestyle	Susie O'Neill; Australia	Martina Moravcová; Slovakia	Claudia Poll; Costa Rica
400 m freestyle	Brooke Bennett; United States	Diana Munz; United States	Claudia Poll; Costa Rica
800 m freestyle	Brooke Bennett; United States	Yana Klochkova; Ukraine	Kaitlin Sandeno; United States
100 m backstroke	Diana Mocanu; Romania	Mai Nakamura; Japan	Nina Zhivanevskaya; Spain
200 m backstroke	Diana Mocanu; Romania	Roxana Maracineanu; France	Miki Nakao; Japan
100 m breaststroke	Megan Quann; United States	Leisel Jones; Australia	Penny Heyns; South Africa
200 m breaststroke	Ágnes Kovács; Hungary	Kristy Kowal; United States	Amanda Beard; United States
100 metre butterfly	Inge de Bruijn; Netherlands	Martina Moravcová; Slovakia	Dara Torres; United States
200 metre butterfly	Misty Hyman; United States	Susie O'Neill; Australia	Petria Thomas; Australia
200 metre individual medley	Yana Klochkova; Ukraine	Beatrice Câșlaru; Romania	Cristina Teuscher; United States
400 metre individual medley	Yana Klochkova; Ukraine	Yasuko Tajima; Japan	Beatrice Câșlaru; Romania
4 × 100 metre freestyle relay	United States; Amy Van Dyken; Courtney Shealy; Jenny Thompson; Dara Torres; Erin Phenix*; Ashley Tappin*	Netherlands; Manon van Rooijen; Wilma van Hofwegen; Inge de Bruijn; Thamar Henneken; Chantal Groot*	Sweden; Johanna Sjöberg; Therese Alshammar; Louise Jöhncke; Anna-Karin Kammerling; Josefin Lillhage*; Malin Svahnström*
4 × 200 metre freestyle relay	United States; Diana Munz; Jenny Thompson; Samantha Arsenault; Lindsay Benko; Julia Stowers*; Kim Black*	Australia; Giaan Rooney; Petria Thomas; Kirsten Thomson; Susie O'Neill; Jacinta van Lint*; Elka Graham*	Germany; Franziska van Almsick; Antje Buschschulte; Sara Harstick; Kerstin Kielgass; Meike Freitag*; Britta Steffen*
4 × 100 metre medley relay	United States; Dara Torres; Barbara Bedford; Megan Quann; Jenny Thompson; Courtney Shealy*; Ashley Tappin*; Amy Van Dyken*; Staciana Stitts*	Australia; Petria Thomas; Leisel Jones; Susie O'Neill; Dyana Calub; Giaan Rooney*; Tarnee White*; Sarah Ryan*	Japan; Masami Tanaka; Sumika Minamoto; Mai Nakamura; Junko Onishi

* Swimmers who participated in the heats only and received medals.

== Synchronized swimming ==
Event	Gold	Silver	Bronze
duet	Russia; Olga Brusnikina; Maria Kisseleva	Japan; Miya Tachibana; Miho Takeda	France; Virginie Dedieu; Myriam Lignot
team	Russia; Yelena Azarova; Olga Brusnikina; Maria Kisseleva; Olga Novokshchenova; Irina Pershina; Yelena Soya; Yuliya Vasilyeva; Olga Vasyukova; Yelena Antonova	Japan; Ayano Egami; Raika Fujii; Yoko Isoda; Rei Jimbo; Miya Tachibana; Miho Takeda; Yoko Yoneda; Yuko Yoneda; Juri Tatsumi	Canada; Lyne Beaumont; Claire Carver-Dias; Erin Chan; Catherine Garceau; Fanny Létourneau; Kirstin Normand; Jacinthe Taillon; Reidun Tatham; Jessica Chase

== Table tennis ==
Event	Gold	Silver	Bronze
Men's singles	Kong Linghui; China	Jan-Ove Waldner; Sweden	Liu Guoliang; China
Women's singles	Wang Nan; China	Ju Li; China	Chen Jing; Chinese Taipei
Men's doubles	China; Wang Liqin; Sen Yan	China; Liu Guoliang; Kong Linghui	France; Jean-Philippe Gatien; Patrick Chila
Women's doubles	China; Ju Li; Wang Nan	China; Sun Jin; Yang Ying	South Korea; Kim Moo-Kyo; Ryu Ji-Hae

== Taekwondo ==
=== Men’s events ===
Event	Gold	Silver	Bronze
Flyweight (−58 kg)	Michail Mouroutsos; Greece	Gabriel Esparza; Spain	Huang Chih-hsiung; Chinese Taipei
Lightweight (−68 kg)	Steven López; United States	Sin Joon-Sik; South Korea	Hadi Saei; Iran
Middleweight (−80 kg)	Ángel Matos; Cuba	Faissal Ebnoutalib; Germany	Víctor Estrada; Mexico
Heavyweight (+80 kg)	Kim Kyong-Hun; South Korea	Daniel Trenton; Australia	Pascal Gentil; France

=== Women’s events ===
Event	Gold	Silver	Bronze
Flyweight (−49 kg)	Lauren Burns; Australia	Urbia Melendez; Cuba	Chi Shu-Ju; Chinese Taipei
Lightweight (−57 kg)	Jung Jae-Eun; South Korea	Tran Hieu Ngan; Vietnam	Hamide Bıkçın Tosun; Turkey
Middleweight (−67 kg)	Lee Sun-Hee; South Korea	Trude Gundersen; Norway	Yoriko Okamoto; Japan
Heavyweight (+67 kg)	Chen Zhong; China	Natalia Ivanova; Russia	Dominique Bosshart; Canada

== Tennis ==
Event	Gold	Silver	Bronze
Men's singles	Yevgeny Kafelnikov; Russia	Tommy Haas; Germany	Arnaud Di Pasquale; France
Women's singles	Venus Williams; United States	Elena Dementieva; Russia	Monica Seles; United States
Men's doubles	Canada; Sébastien Lareau; Daniel Nestor	Australia; Todd Woodbridge; Mark Woodforde	Spain; Àlex Corretja; Albert Costa
Women's doubles	United States; Serena Williams; Venus Williams	Netherlands; Kristie Boogert; Miriam Oremans	Belgium; Els Callens; Dominique Van Roost

== Triathlon ==
Event	Gold	Silver	Bronze
Men's	Simon Whitfield; Canada	Stephan Vuckovic; Germany	Jan Řehula; Czech Republic
Women's	Brigitte McMahon; Switzerland	Michellie Jones; Australia	Magali Messmer; Switzerland

== Volleyball ==
=== Beach ===
Event	Gold	Silver	Bronze
Men's team	United States; Dain Blanton; Eric Fonoimoana	Brazil; Zé Marco de Melo; Ricardo Santos	Germany; Axel Hager; Jörg Ahmann
Women's team	Australia; Natalie Cook; Kerri Ann Pottharst	Brazil; Adriana Behar; Shelda Bede	Brazil; Adriana Samuel; Sandra Pires

=== Indoor ===
Event	Gold	Silver	Bronze
Men's team	FR Yugoslavia; Vladimir Batez; Slobodan Boškan; Andrija Gerić; Nikola Grbić; Vladimir Grbić; Slobodan Kovač; Đula Mešter; Vasa Mijić; Ivan Miljković; Veljko Petković; Goran Vujević; Igor Vušurović	Russia; Igor Shulepov; Valeri Goryushev; Aleksandr Gerasimov; Roman Yakovlev; Aleksey Kazakov; Vadim Khamuttskikh; Aleksey Kuleshov; Evgeni Mitkov; Ruslan Olikhver; Ilya Savelev; Sergey Tetyukhin; Konstantin Ushakov	Italy; Marco Bracci; Andrea Gardini; Andrea Giani; Pasquale Gravina; Marco Meoni; Samuele Papi; Andrea Sartoretti; Paolo Tofoli; Luigi Mastrangelo; Simone Rosalba; Mirko Corsano; Alessandro Fei
Women's team	Cuba; Taismari Aguero; Zoila Barros; Regla Bell; Marlenis Costa; Ana Fernández; Mirka Francia; Idalmis Gato; Lilia Izquierdo; Mireya Luis; Yumilka Ruiz; Martha Sánchez; Regla Torres	Russia; Yevgeniya Artamonova; Anastasiya Belikova; Lioubov Chachkova; Yekaterina Gamova; Yelena Godina; Tatyana Gracheva; Natalya Morozova; Olga Potachova; Inessa Sargsyan; Elizaveta Tishchenko; Elena Tyurina; Yelena Vasilevskaya	Brazil; Leila Barros; Virna Dias; Erika Coimbra; Janina Conceição; Kely Fraga; Ricarda Lima; Kátia Lopes; Walewska Oliveira; Elisângela Oliveira; Karin Rodrigues; Raquel Silva; Hélia Souza

== Water polo ==
Event	Gold	Silver	Bronze
Men's team	Hungary; Attila Vári; Zoltán Szécsi; Bulcsú Székely; Zsolt Varga; Tamás Marcz; Tamás Molnár; Barnabás Steinmetz; Tamás Kásás; Gergely Kiss; Zoltán Kósz; Tibor Benedek; Péter Biros; Rajmund Fodor	Russia; Irek Zinnourov; Dmitri Stratan; Revaz Tchomakhidze; Marat Zakirov; Nikolay Kozlov; Nikolai Maximov; Andrei Reketchinski; Serguei Garbouzov; Dmitry Gorshkov; Yuri Yatsev; Roman Balachov; Dmitri Douquine; Alexandre Erychov	FR Yugoslavia; Pedrag Zimonjić; Jugoslav Vasović; Vladimir Vujasinović; Nenad Vukanić; Aleksandar Šoštar; Petar Trbojević; Veljko Uskoković; Nikola Kuljača; Aleksandar Šapić; Dejan Savić; Aleksandar Ćirić; Danilo Ikodinović; Viktor Jelenić
Women's team	Australia; Taryn Woods; Debbie Watson; Liz Weekes; Danielle Woodhouse; Bronwyn Mayer; Gail Miller; Melissa Mills; Simone Hankin; Yvette Higgins; Kate Hooper; Naomi Castle; Joanne Fox; Bridgette Gusterson	United States; Brenda Villa; Kathy Sheehy; Coralie Simmons; Julie Swail; Courtney Johnson; Maureen O'Toole; Nicolle Payne; Heather Petri; Ericka Lorenz; Heather Moody; Bernice Orwig; Robin Beauregard; Ellen Estes	Russia; Ekaterina Vassilieva; Elena Smurova; Elena Tokoun; Irina Tolkounova; Ioulia Petrova; Tatiana Petrova; Galina Rytova; Maria Koroleva; Natalia Koutouzova; Svetlana Kouzina; Marina Akobia; Ekaterina Anikeeva; Sofia Konoukh

== Weightlifting ==
=== Men's events ===
Event	Gold	Silver	Bronze
Bantamweight (−56 kg)	Halil Mutlu; Turkey	Wu Wenxiong; China	Zhang Xiangxiang; China
Featherweight (−62 kg)	Nikolaj Pešalov; Croatia	Leonidas Sampanis; Greece	Gennady Oleshchuk; Belarus
Lightweight (−69 kg)	Galabin Boevski; Bulgaria	Georgi Markov; Bulgaria	Sergey Lavrenov; Belarus
Middleweight (−77 kg)	Zhan Xugang; China	Viktor Mitrou; Greece	Arsen Melikyan; Armenia
Light heavyweight (−85 kg)	Pyrros Dimas; Greece	Marc Huster; Germany	George Asanidze; Georgia
Middle heavyweight (−94 kg)	Akakios Kakiasvilis; Greece	Szymon Kołecki; Poland	Aleksei Petrov; Russia
Heavyweight (−105 kg)	Hossein Tavakkoli; Iran	Alan Tsagaev; Bulgaria	Said Saif Asaad; Qatar
Super Heavyweight (+105 kg)	Hossein Rezazadeh; Iran	Ronny Weller; Germany	Andrei Chemerkin; Russia

=== Women's events ===
Event	Gold	Silver	Bronze
Flyweight (−48 kg)	Tara Nott; United States	Raema Lisa Rumbewas; Indonesia	Sri Indriyani; Indonesia
Featherweight (−53 kg)	Yang Xia; China	Li Feng-ying; Chinese Taipei	Winarni Binti Slamet; Indonesia
Lightweight (−58 kg)	Soraya Jiménez Mendivil; Mexico	Ri Song Hui; North Korea	Khassaraporn Suta; Thailand
Middleweight (−63 kg)	Chen Xiaomin; China	Valentina Popova; Russia	Ioanna Khatziioannou; Greece
Light heavyweight (−69 kg)	Lin Weining; China	Erzsébet Márkus; Hungary	Karnam Malleswari; India
Heavyweight (− 75 kg)	María Isabel Urrutia; Colombia	Ruth Ogbeifo; Nigeria	Kuo Yi-hang; Chinese Taipei
Super heavyweight (+75 kg)	Ding Meiyuan; China	Agata Wróbel; Poland	Cheryl Haworth; United States

== Wrestling ==
=== Freestyle ===
Event	Gold	Silver	Bronze
Flyweight (−54 kg)	Namig Abdullayev; Azerbaijan	Sammie Henson; United States	Amiran Kardanov; Greece
Bantamweight (−58 kg)	Alireza Dabir; Iran	Yevgen Buslovych; Ukraine	Terry Brands; United States
Featherweight (−63 kg)	Mourad Oumakhanov; Russia	Serafim Barzakov; Bulgaria	Jang Jae-Sung; South Korea
Lightweight (−69 kg)	Daniel Igali; Canada	Arsen Gitinov; Russia	Lincoln McIlravy; United States
Welterweight (−76 kg)	Brandon Slay; United States	Moon Eui-Jae; South Korea	Adem Bereket; Turkey
Middleweight (−85 kg)	Adam Saitiev; Russia	Yoel Romero; Cuba	Magomed Ibragimov; Macedonia
Heavyweight (−97 kg)	Sagid Murtazaliev; Russia	Islam Bairamukov; Kazakhstan	Eldar Kurtanidze; Georgia
Super heavyweight (−130 kg)	David Musulbes; Russia	Artur Taymazov; Uzbekistan	Alexis Rodríguez; Cuba

=== Greco-Roman ===
Event	Gold	Silver	Bronze
Flyweight (−54 kg)	Sim Kwon-Ho; South Korea	Lázaro Rivas; Cuba	Kang Yong-Gyun; North Korea
Bantamweight (−58 kg)	Armen Nazaryan; Bulgaria	Kim In-Sub; South Korea	Sheng Zetian; China
Featherweight (−63 kg)	Varteres Samurgashev; Russia	Juan Marén; Cuba	Akaki Chachua; Georgia
Lightweight (−69 kg)	Filiberto Azcuy; Cuba	Katsuhiko Nagata; Japan	Aleksey Glushkov; Russia
Welterweight (−76 kg)	Murat Kardanov; Russia	Matt Lindland; United States	Marko Yli-Hannuksela; Finland
Middleweight (−85 kg)	Hamza Yerlikaya; Turkey	Sándor Bárdosi; Hungary	Mukhran Vakhtangadze; Georgia
Heavyweight (−97 kg)	Mikael Ljungberg; Sweden	Davyd Saldadze; Ukraine	Garrett Lowney; United States
Super heavyweight (−130 kg)	Rulon Gardner; United States	Aleksandr Karelin; Russia	Dmitry Debelka; Belarus

== Leading medal winners ==
23 competitors won at least three gold medals or three total medals.

Athlete	Nation	Sport	Gold	Silver	Bronze	Total
Ian Thorpe	Australia	Swimming	3	2	0	5
Inge de Bruijn	Netherlands	Swimming	3	1	0	4
Leontien Zijlaard	Netherlands	Cycling	3	1	0	4
Jenny Thompson	United States	Swimming	3	0	1	4
Lenny Krayzelburg	United States	Swimming	3	0	0	3
Michael Klim	Australia	Swimming	2	2	0	4
Alexei Nemov	Russia	Gymnastics	2	1	3	6
Gary Hall Jr.	United States	Swimming	2	1	1	4
Yana Klochkova	Ukraine	Swimming	2	1	0	3
Florian Rousseau	France	Cycling	2	1	0	3
Elena Zamolodchikova	Russia	Gymnastics	2	1	0	3
Dara Torres	United States	Swimming	2	0	3	5
Pieter van den Hoogenband	Netherlands	Swimming	2	0	2	4
Simona Amânar	Romania	Gymnastics	2	0	1	3
Susie O'Neill	Australia	Swimming	1	3	0	4
Svetlana Khorkina	Russia	Gymnastics	1	2	0	3
Dmitry Sautin	Russia	Diving	1	1	2	4
Massimiliano Rosolino	Italy	Swimming	1	1	1	3
Liu Xuan	China	Gymnastics	1	0	2	3
Therese Alshammar	Sweden	Swimming	0	2	1	3
Yekaterina Lobaznyuk	Russia	Gymnastics	0	2	1	3
Petria Thomas	Australia	Swimming	0	2	1	3
Matt Welsh	Australia	Swimming	0	2	1	3

== See also ==
- 2000 Summer Olympics medal table

== Bibliography ==
- Miller, David (2003). Athens to Athens: The Official History of the Olympic Games and the IOC, 1894–2004. Mainstream Publishing. ISBN 1-84018-587-2.
- The Olympic Games: Athens 1894 – Athens 2004. Dorling Kindersley. 2004 [First published 1996]. ISBN 0-7566-0400-1.
- Wallechinsky, David; Loucky, Jaime (2008). The Complete Book of the Olympics. Aurum Press. ISBN 9781845133306.
- Official report of the XXVII Olympiad: Results (PDF). Vol. 3. Sydney Organising Committee for the Olympic Games. 2000. ISBN 0-9579616-1-8. Archived from the original on 18 September 2002.
