= Japan at the 2000 Summer Olympics =

- IOC code: JPN
- NOC: Japanese Olympic Committee
- Website: www.joc.or.jp (in Japanese and English)

in Sydney
- Competitors: 266 (156 men and 110 women) in 28 sports
- Flag bearer: Kosei Inoue
- Medals Ranked 15th: Gold 5 Silver 8 Bronze 5 Total 18

Summer Olympics appearances (overview)
- 1912; 1920; 1924; 1928; 1932; 1936; 1948; 1952; 1956; 1960; 1964; 1968; 1972; 1976; 1980; 1984; 1988; 1992; 1996; 2000; 2004; 2008; 2012; 2016; 2020; 2024; 2028

Japan competed at the 2000 Summer Olympics in Sydney, Australia. 266 competitors, 156 men and 110 women, took part in 156 events in 28 sports.

== Medalists ==
Medal	Name	Sport	Event	Date
Gold	Tadahiro Nomura	Judo	Men's extra lightweight	16 September
Gold	Ryoko Tamura	Judo	Women's extra lightweight	16 September
Gold	Makoto Takimoto	Judo	Men's half middleweight	19 September
Gold	Kosei Inoue	Judo	Men's half heavyweight	21 September
Gold	Naoko Takahashi	Athletics	Women's marathon	24 September
Silver	Yasuko Tajima	Swimming	Women's 400 m individual medley	16 September
Silver	Noriko Narazaki	Judo	Women's half lightweight	17 September
Silver	Mai Nakamura	Swimming	Women's 100 m backstroke	18 September
Silver	Shinichi Shinohara	Judo	Men's heavyweight	22 September
Silver	Reika Utsugi; Miyo Yamada; Noriko Yamaji; Haruka Saito; Juri Takayama; Hiroko Tamoto; Mariko Masubuchi; Naomi Matsumoto; Emi Naito; Kazue Ito; Yoshimi Kobayashi; Shiori Koseki; Misako Ando; Yumiko Fujii; Taeko Ishikawa	Softball	Women's competition	25 September
Silver	Miya Tachibana; Miho Takeda	Synchronized swimming	Women's duet	26 September
Silver	Katsuhiko Nagata	Wrestling	Men's Greco-Roman 69 kg	27 September
Silver	Juri Tatsumi; Yoko Yoneda; Yuko Yoneda; Rei Jimbo; Ayano Egami; Raika Fujii; Miya Tachibana; Yoko Isoda; Miho Takeda	Synchronized swimming	Women's team	29 September
Bronze	Kie Kusakabe	Judo	Women's lightweight	18 September
Bronze	Mayumi Yamashita	Judo	Women's heavyweight	22 September
Bronze	Miki Nakao	Swimming	Women's 200 m backstroke	22 September
Bronze	Junko Onishi; Masami Tanaka; Sumika Minamoto; Mai Nakamura	Swimming	Women's 4 × 100 m medley relay	23 September
Bronze	Yoriko Okamoto	Taekwondo	Women's 67 kg	29 September

Medals by sport
Sport	1st place, gold medalist(s)	2nd place, silver medalist(s)	3rd place, bronze medalist(s)	Total
Judo	4	2	2	8
Athletics	1	0	0	1
Swimming	0	2	2	4
Synchronized swimming	0	2	0	2
Softball	0	1	0	1
Wrestling	0	1	0	1
Taekwondo	0	0	1	1
Total	5	8	5	18

== Competitors ==
The following is the list of number of competitors in the Games.

Sport	Men	Women	Total
Archery	3	2	5
Athletics	28	12	40
Badminton	2	7	9
Baseball	24	–	24
Boxing	2	–	2
Canoeing	1	1	2
Cycling	7	3	10
Diving	1	0	1
Equestrian	8	0	8
Fencing	2	2	4
Football	16	0	16
Gymnastics	7	10	17
Judo	7	7	14
Rowing	6	2	8
Sailing	6	4	10
Shooting	4	5	9
Softball	–	15	15
Swimming	9	12	21
Synchronized swimming	–	9	9
Table tennis	4	5	9
Taekwondo	1	1	2
Tennis	2	3	5
Triathlon	3	3	6
Volleyball	0	4	4
Weightlifting	5	3	8
Wrestling	8	–	8
Total	156	110	266

== Archery ==
Athlete	Event	Ranking round		Round of 64	Round of 32	Round of 16	Quarterfinals	Semifinals	Final / BM	
Athlete	Event	Score	Seed	Opposition Score	Opposition Score	Opposition Score	Opposition Score	Opposition Score	Opposition Score	Rank
Yuji Hamano	Men's individual	623	35	di Buó (ITA); L 158–163	Did not advance					
Masafumi Makiyama	Men's individual	604	50	Li (KAZ); W 151–150	Bisiani (ITA); W 162–159	Oh (KOR); L 160–166	Did not advance			
Takayoshi Matsushita	Men's individual	614	44	Targoński (POL); L 164–166	Did not advance					
Yuji Hamano; Masafumi Makiyama; Takayoshi Matsushita	Men's team	1841	13	—N/a		Turkey; L 231–253	Did not advance			
Mayumi Asano	Women's individual	621	40	Yang (CHN); L 154–156	Did not advance					
Sayoko Kawauchi	Women's individual	654	6	van Lamoen (CHI); W 151–146	Fairweather (AUS); W 160–158	Scavotto (USA); W 159–157	Kim (KOR); L 110–114	Did not advance		

== Athletics ==
Key

- Q = Qualified for the next round by position in race or, in field events, by achieving the automatic qualification target
- q = Qualified for the next round as a fastest loser or, in field events, by position without achieving the qualifying target

Men
Track and road events

Athlete	Event	Heat		Quarterfinal		Semifinal		Final	
Athlete	Event	Time	Rank	Time	Rank	Time	Rank	Time	Rank
Koji Ito	100 m	10.45	31 Q	10.25	14 Q	10.39	13	Did not advance	
Shingo Kawabata	100 m	10.39	29 Q	10.60	39	Did not advance			
Shigeyuki Kojima	100 m	10.59	60	Did not advance					
Koji Ito	200 m	20.75	16 Q	20.56	16 Q	20.67	13	Did not advance	
Shingo Suetsugu	200 m	20.60	9 Q	20.37	11 Q	20.69	14	Did not advance	
Jun Osakada	400 m	45.88	28 q	46.15	30	Did not advance			
Kenji Tabata	400 m	46.59	47	Did not advance					
Takahiko Yamamura	400 m	46.25	39	Did not advance					
Katsuhiko Hanada	5000 m	13:41.31	23	—N/a				Did not advance	
Toshinari Takaoka	5000 m	13:29.99	14 Q	—N/a				13:46.90	15
Katsuhiko Hanada	10,000 m	27:45.13	3 Q	—N/a				28:08.11	15
Toshinari Takaoka	10,000 m	27:59.95	16 Q	—N/a				27:40.44	7
Takayuki Inubushi	Marathon	—N/a						DNF	
Shinji Kawashima	Marathon	—N/a						2:17:21	21
Nobuyuki Sato	Marathon	—N/a						2:20:52	41
Satoru Tanigawa	110 m hurdles	13.74	23 q	13.94	25	Did not advance			
Hideaki Kawamura	400 m hurdles	50.68	30	—N/a		Did not advance			
Dai Tamesue	400 m hurdles	1:01.81	62	—N/a		Did not advance			
Kazuhiko Yamazaki	400 m hurdles	50.15	26	—N/a		Did not advance			
Shigeyuki Kojima; Koji Ito; Shingo Suetsugu; Nobuharu Asahara; Shingo Kawabata	4 × 100 m relay	38.52	3 Q	—N/a		38.31	5 Q	38.66	6
Shunji Karube; Jun Osakada; Kenji Tabata; Takahiko Yamamura	4 × 400 m relay	3:05.21	11 Q	—N/a		3:13.63	14	Did not advance	
Daisuke Ikeshima	20 km walk	—N/a						1:25:34	27
Satoshi Yanagisawa	20 km walk	—N/a						1:25:03	22
Fumio Imamura	50 km walk	—N/a						4:13:28	36
Akihiko Koike	50 km walk	—N/a						DQ	

Field events

Athlete	Event	Qualification		Final	
Athlete	Event	Result	Rank	Result	Rank
Takahisa Yoshida	High jump	2.15	27	Did not advance	
Manabu Yokoyama	Pole vault	5.55	25	Did not advance	
Masaki Morinaga	Long jump	7.84	23	Did not advance	
Daisuke Watanabe	Long jump	NM		Did not advance	
Takanori Sugibayashi	Triple jump	16.67	16	Did not advance	
Koji Murofushi	Hammer throw	78.49	3 Q	76.60	9

Women
Track and road events

Athlete	Event	Heat		Quarterfinal		Semifinal		Final	
Athlete	Event	Time	Rank	Time	Rank	Time	Rank	Time	Rank
Yoshiko Ichikawa	5000 m	15:23.41	18	—N/a				Did not advance	
Michiko Shimizu	5000 m	15:48.20	33	—N/a				Did not advance	
Megumi Tanaka	5000 m	15:39.83	26	—N/a				Did not advance	
Harumi Hiroyama	10,000 m	32:07.68	5 Q	—N/a				32:24.17	20
Yuko Kawakami	10,000 m	32:36.60	16 Q	—N/a				31:27.44	10
Chiemi Takahashi	10,000 m	32:34.70	13 Q	—N/a				31:52.59	15
Ari Ichihashi	Marathon	—N/a						2:30:34	15
Naoko Takahashi	Marathon	—N/a						2:23:14	1st place, gold medalist(s)
Eri Yamaguchi	Marathon	—N/a						2:27:03	7
Yvonne Kanazawa	100 m hurdles	13.13	20 q	13.11	16 q	13.16	15	Did not advance	

Field events

Athlete	Event	Qualification		Final	
Athlete	Event	Result	Rank	Result	Rank
Miki Imai	High jump	1.92	16	Did not advance	
Yoko Ota	High jump	1.94	12 Q	1.90	11

== Badminton ==
Men

Athlete	Event	Round of 64	Round of 32	Round of 16	Quarterfinals	Semifinals	Final / BM	
Athlete	Event	Opposition Result	Opposition Result	Opposition Result	Opposition Result	Opposition Result	Opposition Result	Rank
Keita Masuda	Singles	Bye	Xia (CHN); L 4–15, 15–12, 8–15	Did not advance				
Hidetaka Yamada	Singles	Bye	Hidayat (INA); L 5–15, 17–14, 8–15	Did not advance				

Women

Athlete	Event	Round of 64	Round of 32	Round of 16	Quarterfinals	Semifinals	Final / BM	
Athlete	Event	Opposition Result	Opposition Result	Opposition Result	Opposition Result	Opposition Result	Opposition Result	Rank
Takako Ida	Singles	Bye	Sørensen (DEN); L 12–13, 7–11	Did not advance				
Yasuko Mizui	Singles	Bye	Yakusheva (RUS); W 11–10, 11–6	Mann (GBR); W 11–9, 11–5	Gong (CHN); L 6–11, 3–11	Did not advance		
Kanako Yonekura	Singles	Vattier (FRA); W 11–2, 11–1	Weckström (FIN); W 11–8, 11–2	Dai (CHN); L 2–11, 5–11	Did not advance			
Haruko Matsuda; Yoshiko Iwata	Doubles	—N/a	Valérie-Pierre / Sawaram (MRI); W 15–2, 15–2	Gao / Qin (CHN); L 5–15, 5–15	Did not advance			
Hiroko Nagamine; Satomi Igawa	Doubles	—N/a	Ruslyakova / Yakusheva (RUS); L 9–15, 11–15	Did not advance				

== Baseball ==
Summary

Team	Event	Preliminary round								Semifinal	Final / BM	
Team	Event	Opposition Score	Opposition Score	Opposition Score	Opposition Score	Opposition Score	Opposition Score	Opposition Score	Rank	Opposition Score	Opposition Score	Rank
Japan men	Men's tournament	United States; L 2–4 (F/13)	Netherlands; W 10–2	Australia; W 7–3	Italy; W 6–1	South Africa; W 8–0	South Korea; L 6–7 (F/10)	Cuba; L 2–6	4 Q	Cuba; L 0–3	South Korea; L 1–3	4

Team roster

- So Taguchi
- Fumihiro Suzuki
- Nobuhiko Matsunaka
- Jun Haima
- Norihiro Nakamura
- Yukio Tanaka
- Yoshinori Okihara
- Osamu Nogami
- Yoshihiko Kajiyama
- Yoshikazu Doi
- Masato Kawano
- Shunsuke Watanabe
- Yuji Yoshimi
- Masanori Ishikawa

- Akichika Yamada
- Toshiya Sugiuchi
- Daisuke Matsuzaka
- Masanori Sugiura
- Shinnosuke Abe
- Kosuke Noda
- Tomohiro Iizuka
- Jun Hirose
- Norihiro Akahoshi
- Tomohiro Kuroki
- Manager: Kozo Ohtagaki
- Coach: Hiroyuki Hayashi
- Coach: Keiichi Nagasaki
- Coach: Osamu Nomura

Preliminary round

Pos	Team	Pld	W	L	RF	RA	RD	PCT	GB	Qualification
1	Cuba	7	6	1	50	17	+33	.857 (Note: Cuba defeated the United States 6–1.)	—	Advance to knockout round
2	United States	7	6	1	42	14	+28	.857	—	Advance to knockout round
3	South Korea	7	4	3	40	26	+14	.571 (Note: South Korea defeated Japan 7–6.)	2	Advance to knockout round
4	Japan	7	4	3	41	23	+18	.571	2	Advance to knockout round
5	Netherlands	7	3	4	19	29	−10	.429	3	
6	Italy	7	2	5	33	43	−10	.286 (Note: Italy defeated Australia 8–7.)	4	
7	Australia (H)	7	2	5	30	41	−11	.286	4	
8	South Africa	7	1	6	11	73	−62	.143	5	

(H) Hosts
Notes:

17 September	United States	4–2 (F/13)	Japan	Sydney Baseball Stadium; Attendance: 13,404
17 September		Boxscore		Sydney Baseball Stadium; Attendance: 13,404

18 September	Japan	10–2	Netherlands	Sydney Baseball Stadium; Attendance: 11,360
18 September		Boxscore		Sydney Baseball Stadium; Attendance: 11,360

19 September	Australia	3–7	Japan	Sydney Baseball Stadium; Attendance: 13,093
19 September		Boxscore		Sydney Baseball Stadium; Attendance: 13,093

20 September	Italy	1–6	Japan	Blacktown Olympic Park; Attendance: 3,245
20 September		Boxscore		Blacktown Olympic Park; Attendance: 3,245

22 September	South Africa	0–8	Japan	Blacktown Olympic Park; Attendance: 3,512
22 September		Boxscore		Blacktown Olympic Park; Attendance: 3,512

23 September	Japan	6–7 (F/10)	South Korea	Sydney Baseball Stadium; Attendance: 13,970
23 September		Boxscore		Sydney Baseball Stadium; Attendance: 13,970

24 September	Japan	2–6	Cuba	Blacktown Olympic Park; Attendance: 3,479
24 September		Boxscore		Blacktown Olympic Park; Attendance: 3,479

Semifinal

26 September	Cuba	3–0	Japan	Sydney Baseball Stadium; Attendance: 13,727

Bronze medal game

27 September	South Korea	3 – 1	Japan	Sydney Baseball Stadium; Attendance: 14,058

== Boxing ==
Athlete	Event	Round of 32	Round of 16	Quarterfinal	Semifinal	Final	
Athlete	Event	Opposition Result	Opposition Result	Opposition Result	Opposition Result	Opposition Result	Rank
Kazumasa Tsujimoto	Bantamweight	Oucheikh (MAR); W 12*–12	Rigondeaux (CUB); L RSC R3	Did not advance			
Hidehiko Tsukamoto	Featherweight	Aguilera (CUB); L RSC R3	Did not advance				

== Canoeing ==
=== Slalom ===
Athlete	Event	Preliminary						Final					
Athlete	Event	Run 1	Rank	Run 2	Rank	Total	Rank	Run 1	Rank	Run 2	Rank	Total	Rank
Taro Ando	Men's K-1	210.69	23	231.95	23	442.64	23	Did not advance					

=== Sprint ===
Athlete	Event	Heat		Semifinal		Final	
Athlete	Event	Time	Rank	Time	Rank	Time	Rank
Sayuri Maruyama	Women's K-1 500 metres	2:00.833	8	Did not advance			

== Cycling ==
=== Road ===
Athlete	Event	Time	Rank
Yoshiyuki Abe	Men's road race	DNF	
Miho Oki	Women's road race	3:12:40	41

=== Track ===
Time trial

Athlete	Event	Time	Rank
Narihiro Inamura	Men's time trial	1:05.085	9

Sprint

Athlete	Event	Qualifying		1/16 finals	1/16 repechage	1/8 finals	1/8 repechage	Quarterfinal	Semifinal	Final / BM / Pl.	
Athlete	Event	Time Speed (km/h)	Rank	Opposition Time Speed (km/h)	Opposition Time Speed (km/h)	Opposition Time Speed (km/h)	Opposition Time Speed (km/h)	Opposition Time Speed (km/h)	Opposition Time Speed (km/h)	Opposition Time Speed (km/h)	Rank
Tomohiro Nagatsuka	Men's sprint	10.595; 67.957	13	Buráň (CZE); L	Arrue (USA), Lepka (SVK); L	Did not advance					
Shinichi Ota	Men's sprint	10.603; 67.905	14	Bērziņš (LAT); L	MacLean (GBR), Herrera (CUB); L	Did not advance					

Team sprint

Athlete	Event	Qualification		Semifinals		Final	
Athlete	Event	Time Speed (km/h)	Rank	Opposition Time Speed (km/h)	Rank	Opposition Time Speed (km/h)	Rank
Narihiro Inamura; Yuichiro Kamiyama; Tomohiro Nagatsuka	Men's team sprint	45.406; 59.464	5	Greece; L 45.262; 59.650	5	Did not advance	

Points race

Athlete	Event	Laps behind	Points	Rank
Makoto Iijima	Men's points race	2	6	16
Akemi Morimoto	Women's points race	0	0	16

Keirin

Athlete	Event	First round	Repechage	Second round	Final
Athlete	Event	Rank	Rank	Rank	Rank
Yuichiro Kamiyama	Men's keirin	6 R	DQ	Did not advance	
Shinichi Ota	Men's keirin	3 R	2 Q	6	Did not advance

=== Mountain biking ===
Athlete	Event	Time	Rank
Raita Suzuki	Men's cross-country	–1 lap	34
Hiroko Nambu	Women's cross-country	2:06:13.88	26

== Diving ==
Athlete	Event	Preliminary		Semifinal				Final		Total	
Athlete	Event	Points	Rank	Points	Rank	Total	Rank	Points	Rank	Points	Rank
Ken Terauchi	Men's 3 m springboard	389.88	11 Q	226.89	6	616.77	9 Q	407.58	7	634.47	8
Ken Terauchi	Men's 10 m platform	457.59	4 Q	191.49	4	649.08	5 Q	445.41	5	636.90	5

== Equestrianism ==
=== Eventing ===
Athlete	Horse	Event	Dressage		Cross-country		Jumping		Total	
Athlete	Horse	Event	Penalties	Rank	Penalties	Rank	Penalties	Rank	Penalties	Rank
Daisuke Kato	Akwaba	Individual	48.00	16	DNF					
Masaru Fuse; Shigeyuki Hosono; Daisuke Kato; Takeaki Tsuchiya	Voyou du Roc; Urfe des Landes; Elusive Warlock; Right on Time	Team	171.60	9	DNF					

=== Jumping ===
Athlete	Horse	Event	Qualification								Final				Total	
Athlete	Horse	Event	Round 1		Round 2			Round 3			Round A		Round B		Total	
Athlete	Horse	Event	Penalties	Rank	Penalties	Total	Rank	Penalties	Total	Rank	Penalties	Rank	Penalties	Rank	Penalties	Rank
Tadayoshi Hayashi	Swanky	Individual	5.75	18	8.00	13.75	19	8.00	21.75	24	Did not advance					
Ryuma Hirota	Man of Gold	Individual	33.75	71	8.00	41.75	67	40.50	82.25	66	Did not advance					
Takeshi Shirai	Vicomte du Mesnil	Individual	9.00	27	8.00	17.00	26	20.00	37.00	48	Did not advance					
Taizo Sugitani	Mania Jolly	Individual	8.75	25	10.00	18.75	35	16.00	34.75	45 q	12.00	20 Q	12.50	24	24.50	25
Tadayoshi Hayashi; Ryuma Hirota; Takeshi Shirai|br>Taizo Sugitani	See above	Team	—N/a								24.00	10 Q	44.00	11	68.00	11

== Fencing ==
Four fencers, two men and two women, represented Japan in 2000.

Athlete	Event	Round of 64	Round of 32	Round of 16	Quarterfinal	Semifinal	Final / BM	
Athlete	Event	Opposition Result	Opposition Result	Opposition Result	Opposition Result	Opposition Result	Opposition Result	Rank
Naoto Okazaki	Men's foil	Shahrayen (KUW); L 6–15	Did not advance					
Masashi Nagara	Men's sabre	Lukashenko (UKR); L 7–15	Did not advance					
Yuko Arai	Women's foil	Rédouane (ALG); W 15–3	Mohamed (HUN); L 6–15	Did not advance				
Miwako Shimada	Women's foil	Carbone (ARG); L 13–15	Did not advance					

== Football ==
Summary

Team	Event	Group stage				Quarterfinal	Semifinal	Final / BM	
Team	Event	Opposition Score	Opposition Score	Opposition Score	Rank	Opposition Score	Opposition Score	Opposition Score	Rank
Japan men	Men's tournament	South Africa; W 2–1	Slovakia; W 2–1	Brazil; L 0–1	2 Q	United States; L 4–5^{P} 2–2 (a.e.t.)	Did not advance		

=== Men ===
Squad

Head coach: (France) Philippe Troussier

No.	Pos.	Player	Date of birth (age)	Caps	Club
1	GK	Seigo Narazaki*	15 April 1976 (aged 24)		(Japan) Nagoya Grampus Eight
2	DF	Yuji Nakazawa	25 February 1978 (aged 22)		(Japan) Verdy Kawasaki
3	DF	Naoki Matsuda	14 March 1977 (aged 23)		(Japan) Yokohama F. Marinos
4	DF	Ryuzo Morioka*	7 October 1975 (aged 24)		(Japan) Shimizu S-Pulse
5	DF	Tsuneyasu Miyamoto	7 February 1977 (aged 23)		(Japan) Gamba Osaka
6	MF	Junichi Inamoto	18 September 1979 (aged 20)		(Japan) Gamba Osaka
7	MF	Hidetoshi Nakata	22 January 1977 (aged 23)		(Italy) Roma
8	MF	Tomakazu Myojin	24 January 1978 (aged 22)		(Japan) Kashiwa Reysol
9	FW	Tomoyuki Hirase	23 May 1977 (aged 23)		(Japan) Kashima Antlers
10	MF	Shunsuke Nakamura	24 June 1978 (aged 22)		(Japan) Yokohama F. Marinos
11	MF	Atsuhiro Miura*	24 July 1974 (aged 26)		(Japan) Yokohama F. Marinos
12	MF	Tomoyuki Sakai	29 June 1979 (aged 21)		(Japan) JEF United Ichihara Chiba
13	FW	Atsushi Yanagisawa	27 May 1977 (aged 23)		(Japan) Kashima Antlers
14	MF	Masashi Motoyama	20 June 1979 (aged 21)		(Japan) Kashima Antlers
15	MF	Norihiro Nishi	9 May 1980 (aged 20)		(Japan) Júbilo Iwata
16	DF	Koji Nakata	9 July 1979 (aged 21)		(Japan) Kashima Antlers
17	FW	Naohiro Takahara	4 June 1979 (aged 21)		(Japan) Júbilo Iwata
18	GK	Ryota Tsuzuki	18 April 1978 (aged 22)		(Japan) Gamba Osaka

- Stand-by players

No.	Pos.	Player	Date of birth (age)	Caps	Club
19	FW	Kota Yoshihara	2 February 1978 (aged 22)		(Japan) Gamba Osaka
20	DF	Satoshi Yamaguchi	17 April 1978 (aged 22)		(Japan) JEF United Ichihara Chiba
21	MF	Yasuhito Endo	28 January 1980 (aged 20)		(Japan) Kyoto Purple Sanga
22	GK	Hitoshi Sogahata	2 August 1979 (aged 21)		(Japan) Kashima Antlers

Group D

Team	Pld	W	D	L	GF	GA	GD	Pts
Brazil	3	2	0	1	5	4	+1	6
Japan	3	2	0	1	4	3	+1	6
South Africa	3	1	0	2	5	5	0	3
Slovakia	3	1	0	2	4	6	−2	3

14 September 2000
20:00

South Africa	1–2	Japan
Nomvethe 31'	Report	Takahara 45+1', 79'

Bruce Stadium, Canberra
Attendance: 17,500
Referee: Stéphane Bré (France)
17 September 2000
20:00

Slovakia	1–2	Japan
Porázik 83'	Report	Nakata 67'; Inamoto 74'

Bruce Stadium, Canberra
Attendance: 15,289
Referee: Falla N'Doye (Senegal)
20 September 2000
19:00

Brazil	1–0	Japan
Alex 5'	Report

Brisbane Cricket Ground, Brisbane
Attendance: 36,608
Referee: Stéphane Bré (France)

Quarter-finals

23 September 2000
18:30

United States	2–2 (a.e.t.)	Japan
Wolff 68'; Vagenas 90' (pen.)	Report	Yanagisawa 30'; Takahara 72'
Penalties
Vagenas (penalty scored); Agoos (penalty scored); Donovan (penalty scored); Wolff (penalty scored); Victorine (penalty scored)	5–4	(penalty scored) Nakamura; (penalty scored) Inamoto; (penalty scored) Morioka; (penalty missed) Nakata; (penalty scored) Myojin

Hindmarsh Stadium, Adelaide
Attendance: 18,345
Referee: Felix Tangawarima (Zimbabwe)

== Gymnastics ==
=== Artistic ===
==== Men ====
Team

Athlete	Event	Qualification								Final							
Athlete	Event	Apparatus						Total	Rank	Apparatus						Total	Rank
Athlete	Event	F	PH	R	V	PB	HB	Total	Rank	F	PH	R	V	PB	HB	Total	Rank
Kenichi Fujita	Team	9.425	9.587	9.487	9.662	8.812	9.587	56.560	18 Q	9.325	9.525	9.525	9.712	9.212	9.700	—N/a	
Mutsumi Harada	Team	9.175	9.450	9.487	—N/a	9.262	9.600	46.974	58	9.212	8.350	9.350	—N/a	9.450	9.650	—N/a	
Norimasa Iwai	Team	—N/a		9.687 Q	9.450	9.562	—N/a	28.699	86	—N/a		9.675	9.700	8.787	—N/a	—N/a	
Akihiro Kasamatsu	Team	9.350	9.662	—N/a	9.662	—N/a	9.637	38.311	66	9.712	9.612	—N/a	9.650	—N/a	9.637	—N/a	
Yoshihiro Saito	Team	9.150	9.525	9.575	9.562	8.975	9.700	56.487	20 Q	9.312	9.550	9.575	9.437	9.512	9.762	—N/a	
Naoya Tsukahara	Team	9.162	9.637	9.625	9.612	9.200	9.750 Q	56.986	10 Q	9.500	9.637	9.650	9.662	9.537	9.712	—N/a	
Total	Team	37.112	38.411	38.374	38.498	36.999	38.687	228.081	5 Q	37.849	38.324	38.425	38.724	37.711	38.824	229.857	4

Individual events

Athlete	Event	Apparatus						Total	Rank
Athlete	Event	F	PH	R	V	PB	HB	Total	Rank
Kenichi Fujita	All-around	9.512	9.637	9.600	9.575	8.750	8.800	55.874	25
Norimasa Iwai	Rings	—N/a		9.662	—N/a			9.662	7
Yoshihiro Saito	All-around	9.512	9.600	9.662	9.437	9.425	9.725	57.361	12
Naoya Tsukahara	All-around	9.362	8.425	9.650	9.562	9.662	9.762	56.423	18
Naoya Tsukahara	Horizontal bar	—N/a					8.825	8.825	8

==== Women ====
Individual

Athlete	Event	Qualification						Final					
Athlete	Event	Apparatus				Total	Rank	Apparatus				Total	Rank
Athlete	Event	V	UB	BB	F	Total	Rank	V	UB	BB	F	Total	Rank
Miho Takenaka	All-around	9.125	8.750	9.300	8.725	35.900	53	Did not advance					
Kana Yamawaki	All-around	9.356	9.500	9.025	9.300	37.181	31 Q	9.293	9.012	9.025	9.312	36.642	27

=== Rhythmic ===
Group all-around

Athlete	Event	Qualification				Final			
Athlete	Event	Clubs	Hoops + Ribbon	Total	Rank	Clubs	Hoops + Ribbon	Total	Rank
Ayako Inada; Yukari Mizobe; Yukari Murata; Rie Nakashima; Masami Nakata; Madoka Okamori	Group all-around	19.500	19.266	38.766	4 Q	19.350	19.200	38.550	5

Individual all-around

Athlete	Event	Qualification						Final					
Athlete	Event	Rope	Hoop	Ball	Ribbon	Total	Rank	Rope	Hoop	Ball	Ribbon	Total	Rank
Rieko Matsunaga	Individual	9.541	9.608	9.633	9.625	38.407	16	Did not advance					

=== Trampolining ===
Athlete	Event	Qualification		Final	
Athlete	Event	Score	Rank	Score	Rank
Daisuke Nakata	Men's	53.2	12	Did not advance	
Akiko Furu	Women's	62.1	7 Q	35.3	6

== Judo ==
Men

Athlete	Event	First round	Round of 32	Round of 16	Quarterfinal	Semifinal	Repechage 1	Repechage 2	Repechage 3	Repechage 4	Final / BM	
Athlete	Event	Opposition Result	Opposition Result	Opposition Result	Opposition Result	Opposition Result	Opposition Result	Opposition Result	Opposition Result	Opposition Result	Opposition Result	Rank
Tadahiro Nomura	–60 kg	Bye	Jia (CHN); W 1000–0000	Greczkowski (USA); W 1001–0000	Matuszek (SVK); W 1000–0000	Poulot (CUB); W 0010–0002	—N/a				Jung (KOR); W 1000–0000	1st place, gold medalist(s)
Yukimasa Nakamura	–66 kg	Ayad (LBA); W 1010–0001	Lounifi (TUN); W 0201–0100	van Kalken (NED); L 0020–1100	Did not advance		—N/a	Pürevdorjiin (MGL); W 0011–0010	Baglayev (KAZ); W 1010–0000	Miresmaeili (IRI); W 1000–0000	Giovinazzo (ITA); L 0010–0010	5
Kenzo Nakamura	–73 kg	Bye	Baștea (ROU); W 0110–0010	Lewak (POL); W 1001–0000	Choi (KOR); L 0001–1010	Did not advance	—N/a		Pedro (USA); L 0010–0200	Did not advance		
Makoto Takimoto	–81 kg	Bye	Seilkhanov (KAZ); W 0210–0010	García (ARG); W 1000–0000	Paseyro (URU); W 0001–0001	Bouras (FRA); W 0100–0001	—N/a				Cho (KOR); W 0021–0001	1st place, gold medalist(s)
Hidehiko Yoshida	–90 kg	—N/a	Shakimov (KAZ); W 0012–0002	Hachicha (TUN); W 0010–0010	Honorato (BRA); L 0000–1000	Did not advance	—N/a		González (ESP); L walkover	Did not advance		
Kosei Inoue	–100 kg	Bye	Kessel (CUB); W 1000–0000	Gowing (NZL); W 1000–0000	Ze'evi (ISR); W 1011–0000	Guido (ITA); W 0210–0000	—N/a				Gill (CAN); W 1001–0001	1st place, gold medalist(s)
Shinichi Shinohara	+100 kg	Bye	Sharapou (BLR); W 1000–0000	Berduta (KAZ); W 1001–0010	Sánchez (CUB); W 0010–0001	Tmenov (RUS); W 1011–0021	—N/a				Douillet (FRA); L 0010–0020	2nd place, silver medalist(s)

Women

Athlete	Event	Round of 32	Round of 16	Quarterfinals	Semifinals	Repechage 1	Repechage 2	Repechage 3	Final / BM	
Athlete	Event	Opposition Result	Opposition Result	Opposition Result	Opposition Result	Opposition Result	Opposition Result	Opposition Result	Opposition Result	Rank
Ryoko Tamura	–48 kg	Bye	Zhao (CHN); W 0010–0000	Lusnikova (UKR); W 1010–0000	Cha (PRK); W 0010–0010	—N/a			Bruletova (RUS); W 1000–0000	1st place, gold medalist(s)
Noriko Narazaki	–52 kg	Baillargeon (CAN); W 1001–0001	Jang (KOR); W 1001–0000	Souakri (ALG); W 0020–0001	Liu (CHN); W 1000–0001	—N/a			Verdecia (CUB); L 0100–1001	2nd place, silver medalist(s)
Kie Kusakabe	–57 kg	Bye	Peel (GBR); W 0220–0010	Fernández (ESP); L 0001–0001	Did not advance	—N/a	Khishigbatyn (MGL); W 0010–0000	Hüseynova (AZE); W 1000–0000	Shen (CHN); W 1010–0000	3rd place, bronze medalist(s)
Keiko Maeda	–63 kg	Bye	Schutz (USA); L 0102–0120	Did not advance						
Masae Ueno	–70 kg	Bye	Dorjgotovyn (MGL); W 1140–0000	Martín (ESP); L 0010–1001	Did not advance	—N/a	Werbrouck (BEL); L 0001–0200	Did not advance		
Noriko Anno	–78 kg	Bye	Pierantozzi (ITA); L 0000–0001	Did not advance						
Mayumi Yamashita	+78 kg	Bye	Rodina (RUS); W 1021–0001	Rosensteel (USA); W 0202–0000	Beltrán (CUB); L 0000–0201	—N/a			Cicot (FRA); W 1001–0001	3rd place, bronze medalist(s)

== Rowing ==
Athlete	Event	Heat		Repechage		Semifinal		Final	
Athlete	Event	Time	Rank	Time	Rank	Time	Rank	Time	Rank
Hitoshi Hase; Daisaku Takeda	Men's lightweight double sculls	6:27.00	2 R	6:33.81	1 SA/B	6:23.37	3 FA	6:29.74	6
Keisuke Murai; Atsushi Obata; Hiroya Sato; Yasunori Tanabe	Men's lightweight coxless four	6:22.31	5 R	6:18.56	5	Did not advance			14
Ayako Yoshida; Akiko Iwamoto	Women's lightweight double sculls	7:27.12	4 R	7:23.36	5 FC	—N/a		7:15.01	14

== Sailing ==
Five men and four women competed in six different Sailing events at the 2000 Olympics, including two top 10 finishes.

Men

Athlete	Event	Race											Points	Rank
Athlete	Event	1	2	3	4	5	6	7	8	9	10	11	Points	Rank
Motokazu Kenjo	Mistral	10	18	9	20	28	12	12	12	15	~~37~~	~~31~~	136	20
Eiichiro Hamazaki; Yuji Miyai	470	19	~~22~~	~~26~~	13	4	16	17	18	10	16	20	133	18

Women

Athlete	Event	Race											Points	Rank
Athlete	Event	1	2	3	4	5	6	7	8	9	10	11	Points	Rank
Masako Imai	Mistral	6	12	10	10	~~15~~	5	9	11	~~16~~	7	8	78	10
Maiko Sato	Europe	21	13	20	22	22	17	22	~~24~~	22	~~23~~	13	172	23
Yumiko Shige; Alicia Kinoshita	470	9	5	10	7	1	~~14~~	8	3	~~12~~	12	11	66	8

Open

Athlete	Event	Race																Points	Rank
Athlete	Event	1	2	3	4	5	6	7	8	9	10	11	12	13	14	15	16	Points	Rank
Kunio Suzuki	Laser	~~38~~	12	19	15	32	~~36~~	17	25	24	30	28	—N/a					202	27
Kenji Nakamura; Tomoyuki Sasaki	49er	4	4	10	15	9	16	~~17~~	15	15	13	16	~~17~~	14	16	14	12	173	16

== Shooting ==
Men

Athlete	Event	Qualification		Final		Total	
Athlete	Event	Points	Rank	Points	Rank	Points	Rank
Naoki Kurita	50 m rifle three positions	1138	40	Did not advance			
Naoki Kurita	50 m rifle prone	589	35	Did not advance			
Masaru Nakashige	50 m pistol	558	14	Did not advance			
Masaru Nakashige	10 m air pistol	573	25	Did not advance			
Noriyuki Nishitani	50 m pistol	552	23	Did not advance			
Noriyuki Nishitani	10 m air pistol	564	36	Did not advance			
Masaru Yanagida	10 m air rifle	585	34	Did not advance			

Women

Athlete	Event	Qualification		Final		Total	
Athlete	Event	Points	Rank	Points	Rank	Points	Rank
Michiko Fukushima	25 m pistol	585	3 Q	99.8	5	684.8	5
Michiko Fukushima	10 m air pistol	383	7 Q	100.7	1	483.7	5
Yoko Inada	25 m pistol	581	7 Q	98.6	7	679.6	7
Yoko Inada	10 m air pistol	383	7 Q	98.2	5	481.2	8
Hiromi Misaki	50 m rifle three positions	558	37	Did not advance			
Hiromi Misaki	10 m air rifle	392	15	Did not advance			
Yukie Nakayama	Double trap	94	13	Did not advance			
Taeko Takeba	Trap	56	16	Did not advance			

== Softball ==
Summary

Team	Event	Preliminary round								Semifinal	Bronze medal game	Final	
Team	Event	Opposition Score	Opposition Score	Opposition Score	Opposition Score	Opposition Score	Opposition Score	Opposition Score	Rank	Opposition Score	Opposition Score	Opposition Score	Rank
Japan women	Women's tournament	Cuba; W 4–1	China; W 3–1	United States; W 2–1 (F/11)	Australia; W 1–0	Canada; W 4–3 (F/10)	Italy; W 2–0 (F/8)	New Zealand; W 2–1	1 Q	Australia; W 1–0	Bye	United States; L 0–1 (F/8)	2nd place, silver medalist(s)

Roster
- Misako Ando
- Yumiko Fujii
- Taeko Ishikawa
- Kazue Ito
- Yoshimi Kobayashi
- Shiori Koseki
- Mariko Masubuchi
- Naomi Matsumoto
- Emi Naito
- Haruka Saito
- Juri Takayama
- Hiroko Tamoto
- Reika Utsugi
- Miyo Yamada
- Noriko Yamaji

Preliminary round

Qualified for the final round

Team	W	L	PCT	Tiebreaker (Head–to–head record)
Japan	7	0	1.000	
Australia	6	1	.857	
China	5	2	.714	
United States	4	3	.571	
Italy	2	5	.286	1–0
New Zealand	2	5	.286	0–1
Cuba	1	6	.143	1–0
Canada	1	6	.143	0–1

17 September 2000 17:30 (AEDT) Blacktown Olympic Park
Team	1	2	3	4	5	6	7	R	H	E
Cuba	0	0	0	0	0	0	1	1	3	3
Japan	1	1	0	2	0	0	X	4	6	0
WP: Juri Takayama (1–0) LP: Estela Milanes (0–1); Home runs: CUB: Olga Ruyol (1); JPN: Haruka Saito (1)

18 September 2000 10:30 (AEDT) Blacktown Olympic Park
Team	1	2	3	4	5	6	7	R	H	E
China	1	0	0	0	0	0	0	1	5	0
Japan	0	2	0	0	0	1	X	3	5	0
WP: Yumiko Fujii (1–0) LP: Zhang Yanqing (0–1) Sv: Mariko Masubuchi (1); Home runs: CHN: None; JPN: None

19 September 2000 10:30 (AEDT) Blacktown Olympic Park
Team	1	2	3	4	5	6	7	8	9	10	11	R	H	E
Japan	0	0	0	0	0	0	0	0	0	0	2	2	7	0
United States	0	0	0	0	0	0	0	0	0	0	1	1	11	4
WP: Juri Takayama (2–0) LP: Michele Smith (0–1); Home runs: JPN: None; USA: None

20 September 2000 13:00 (AEDT) Blacktown Olympic Park
Team	1	2	3	4	5	6	7	8	R	H	E
Japan	0	0	0	0	0	0	0	1	1	5	0
Australia	0	0	0	0	0	0	0	0	0	3	1
WP: Juri Takayama (3–0) LP: Melanie Roche (1–1); Home runs: JPN: None; AUS: None

21 September 2000 20:00 (AEDT) Blacktown Olympic Park
Team	1	2	3	4	5	6	7	8	9	10	R	H	E
Japan	2	0	0	0	0	1	0	0	0	1	4	8	1
Canada	0	0	0	0	0	3	0	0	0	0	3	8	1
WP: Juri Takayama (4–0) LP: Heather Newsham (0–2); Home runs: JPN: Haruka Saito (2), Miyo Yamada (1); CAN: Erin Woods (1)

22 September 2000 20:00 (AEDT) Blacktown Olympic Park
Team	1	2	3	4	5	6	7	8	R	H	E
Japan	0	0	0	0	0	0	0	2	2	5	0
Italy	0	0	0	0	0	0	0	0	0	6	1
WP: Yumiko Fujii (2–0) LP: Nicole Di Salvio (0–1); Home runs: JPN: None; ITA: None

23 September 2000 17:30 (AEDT) Blacktown Olympic Park
Team	1	2	3	4	5	6	7	R	H	E
New Zealand	0	0	0	0	0	0	1	1	7	1
Japan	2	0	0	0	0	0	X	2	6	2
WP: Juri Takayama (5–0) LP: Ruta Lealamanua (0–1); Home runs: NZL: None; JPN: Reika Utsugi (1)

Semifinal

25 September 2000 9:30 (AEDT) Blacktown Olympic Park
Team	1	2	3	4	5	6	7	R	H	E
Japan	0	0	0	1	0	0	0	1	3	1
Australia	0	0	0	0	0	0	0	0	1	0
WP: Mariko Masubuchi (1–0) LP: Tanya Harding (2–1); Home runs: JPN: Reika Utsugi (2); AUS: None

Gold medal game

26 September 2000 19:30 (AEDT) Blacktown Olympic Park
Team	1	2	3	4	5	6	7	8	R	H	E
Japan	0	0	0	1	0	0	0	0	1	3	1
United States	0	0	0	0	1	0	0	1	2	1	1
WP: Lisa Fernandez (2–1) LP: Juri Takayama (5–1); Home runs: JPN: Reika Utsugi (3); USA: None

== Swimming ==
Men

Athlete	Event	Heat		Semifinal		Final	
Athlete	Event	Time	Rank	Time	Rank	Time	Rank
Yota Arase	1500 m freestyle	15:18.20	16	—N/a		Did not advance	
Akira Hayashi	100 m breaststroke	1:02.86	21	Did not advance			
Akira Hayashi	200 m breaststroke	2:15.54	13 Q	2:15.16	14	Did not advance	
Masato Hirano	400 m freestyle	3:51.42	11	—N/a		Did not advance	
Masato Hirano	1500 m freestyle	15:14.43	13	—N/a		Did not advance	
Kosuke Kitajima	100 m breaststroke	1:01.68	5 Q	1:01.31	4 Q	1:01.34	4
Kosuke Kitajima	200 m breaststroke	2:15.71	17	Did not advance			
Jiro Miki	200 m individual medley	2:03.33	16 Q	2:03.90	16	Did not advance	
Susumu Tabuchi	200 m individual medley	2:05.68	30	Did not advance			
Susumu Tabuchi	400 m individual medley	4:20.76	13	—N/a		Did not advance	
Hisayoshi Tanaka	200 m butterfly	1:59.00	14 Q	1:58.06	12	Did not advance	
Shinya Taniguchi	400 m individual medley	4:17.36	6 Q	—N/a		4:20.93	8
Takashi Yamamoto	100 m butterfly	52.91	4 Q	53.01	6 Q	52.58	5
Takashi Yamamoto	200 m butterfly	1:58.07	10 Q	1:57.66	9	Did not advance	

Women

Athlete	Event	Heat		Semifinal		Final	
Athlete	Event	Time	Rank	Time	Rank	Time	Rank
Tomoko Hagiwara	200 m backstroke	2:12.15	4 Q	2:11.02	2 Q	2:11.21	4
Tomoko Hagiwara	200 m individual medley	2:15.16	7 Q	2:15.09	8 Q	2:15.64	8
Noriko Inada	100 m backstroke	1:02.19	7 Q	1:01.25	3 Q	1:01.14	5
Junko Isoda	200 m breaststroke	2:29.60	17 q	2:31.71	16	Did not advance	
Sumika Minamoto	50 m freestyle	25.52	7 Q	25.43	7 Q	25.65	8
Sumika Minamoto	100 m freestyle	55.80	9 Q	55.62	8 Q	55.53	7
Maki Mita	100 m butterfly	1:00.97	21	Did not advance			
Maki Mita	200 m butterfly	2:09.85	6 Q	2:09.88	7 Q	2:10.72	8
Mai Nakamura	100 m backstroke	1:00.88	1 Q	1:01.07	2 Q	1:00.55	2nd place, silver medalist(s)
Yuko Nakanishi	200 m butterfly	2:10.22	8 Q	2:09.89	8 Q	2:09.66	7
Miki Nakao	200 m backstroke	2:11.69	4 Q	2:12.49	5 Q	2:11.05	3rd place, bronze medalist(s)
Junko Onishi	100 m butterfly	59.11	7 Q	59.04	6 Q	59.13	6
Yasuko Tajima	400 m freestyle	4:17.23	23	—N/a		Did not advance	
Yasuko Tajima	200 m individual medley	2:21.65	26	Did not advance			
Yasuko Tajima	400 m individual medley	4:40.35	2 Q	—N/a		4:35.96	2nd place, silver medalist(s)
Masami Tanaka	100 m breaststroke	1:09.12	7 Q	1:09.04	7 Q	1:08.37	6
Masami Tanaka	200 m breaststroke	2:27.39	5 Q	2:26.24	7 Q	2:26.98	7
Sachiko Yamada	400 m freestyle	4:12.45	12	—N/a		Did not advance	
Sachiko Yamada	800 m freestyle	8:33.06	7 Q	—N/a		8:37.39	8
Mai Nakamura; Masami Tanaka; Junko Onishi; Sumika Minamoto	4 × 100 m medley relay	4:05.76	2 Q	—N/a		4:04.16	3rd place, bronze medalist(s)

== Synchronized swimming ==
Japan won two silver medals in the synchronized swimming competition at the 2000 Olympics.

Athlete	Event	Technical routine		Free routine (preliminary)				Free routine (final)		Total	
Athlete	Event	Points	Rank	Points	Rank	Total	Rank	Points	Rank	Points	Rank
Miya Tachibana; Miho Takeda	Duet	98.000	2	98.400	2	98.260	2 Q	99.000	2	98.650	2nd place, silver medalist(s)
Ayano Egami; Raika Fujii; Yoko Isoda; Rei Jimbo; Miya Tachibana; Miho Takeda; Juri Tatsumi; Yoko Yoneda; Yuko Yoneda	Team	98.600	2	—N/a				99.000	2	98.860	2nd place, silver medalist(s)

== Table tennis ==
Men

Athlete	Event	Group stage			Round of 32	Round of 16	Quarterfinals	Semifinals	Final / BM	
Athlete	Event	Opposition Result	Opposition Result	Rank	Opposition Result	Opposition Result	Opposition Result	Opposition Result	Opposition Result	Rank
Seiko Iseki	Singles	Arado (CUB); W 3–0	Cheng (USA); W 3–1	1 Q	Waldner (SWE); L 1–3	Did not advance				
Koji Matsushita	Singles	Bye			Cheung (HKG); W 3–0	Persson (SWE); L 0–3	Did not advance			
Toshio Tasaki	Singles	Plachý (CZE); W 3–0	Gambra (CHI); W 3–1	1 Q	Primorac (CRO); W 3–0	Roßkopf (GER); L 2–3	Did not advance			
Seiko Iseki; Toshio Tasaki	Doubles	Gambra / Morales (CHI); W 2–0	Saive / Saive (BEL); W 2–0	1 Q	—N/a	Wang / Yan (CHN); L 0–3	Did not advance			
Hiroshi Shibutani; Koji Matsushita	Doubles	Cheng / Nguyen (USA); W 2–0	Maze / Tugwell (DEN); L 0–2	2	Did not advance					

Women

Athlete	Event	Group stage			Round of 32	Round of 16	Quarterfinals	Semifinals	Final / BM	
Athlete	Event	Opposition Result	Opposition Result	Rank	Opposition Result	Opposition Result	Opposition Result	Opposition Result	Opposition Result	Rank
An Konishi	Singles	Bye			Xu (TPE); W 3–0	Ryu (KOR); L 2–3	Did not advance			
Chire Koyama	Singles	Bye			Lee (KOR); W 3–0	Chen-tong (TPE); W 3–2	Wang (CHN); L 0–3	Did not advance		
Rinko Sakata	Singles	Oshonaike (NGR); W 3–2	Miao (AUS); W 3–0	1 Q	Gotsch (GER); L 0–3	Did not advance				
Ai Fujinuma; An Konishi	Doubles	Tepes / Morel (CHI); W 2–1	Wong / Song (HKG); W 2–1	1 Q	—N/a	Kim / Ryu (KOR); L 0–3	Did not advance			
Kazuko Naito; Rinko Sakata	Doubles	Zhou / Lay (AUS); W 2–1	Prūsienė / Garkauskaitė (LTU); L 0–2	2	Did not advance					

== Taekwondo ==
Athlete	Event	Round of 16	Quarterfinals	Semifinals	Repechage Quarterfinals	Repechage Semifinals	Final / BM	
Athlete	Event	Opposition Result	Opposition Result	Opposition Result	Opposition Result	Opposition Result	Opposition Result	Rank
Kiyoteru Higuchi	Men's –58 kg	Huang (TPE); L 0–4	Did not advance					
Yoriko Okamoto	Women's –67 kg	Bidani (MAR); W 4–1	Gundersen (NOR); L 4–7	Did not advance	—N/a	Müskens (NED); W 7–5	Stevenson (GBR); W 6–5	3rd place, bronze medalist(s)

== Tennis ==
Athlete	Event	Round of 64	Round of 32	Round of 16	Quarterfinals	Semifinals	Final / BM	
Athlete	Event	Opposition Result	Opposition Result	Opposition Result	Opposition Result	Opposition Result	Opposition Result	Rank
Satoshi Iwabuchi; Thomas Shimada	Men's doubles	—N/a	Hrbatý / Kučera (SVK); L 4–6, 3–6	Did not advance				
Shinobu Asagoe	Women's singles	Callens (BEL); L 0–6, 4–6	Did not advance					
Ai Sugiyama	Women's singles	Dokic (AUS); L 0–6, 6^{1}–7	Did not advance					
Nana Miyagi; Ai Sugiyama	Women's doubles	—N/a	Basuki / Prakusya (INA); W 6–2, 5–7, 6–4	Sangaram / Tanasugarn (THA); L 6–2, 5–7, 2–6	Did not advance			

== Triathlon ==
Athlete	Event	Swim	Trans. 1	Cycle	Trans. 2	Run	Total	Rank
Hideo Fukui	Men's	17:27.39	29.90	59:12.10	20.40	34:35.00	1:52:04.79	36
Hiroyuki Nishiuchi	Men's	17:51.59	24.20	1:03:39.70	17.50	34:46.77	1:56:59.76	46
Takumi Obara	Men's	17:46.19	24.30	59:02.50	18.70	32:58.26	1:50:29.95	21
Akiko Hirao	Women's	19:59.58	30.50	1:06:39.60	26.50	36:42.52	2:04:18.70	17
Haruna Hosoya	Women's	20:16.08	25.90	DNF				
Kiyomi Niwata	Women's	19:19.48	27.50	1:05:13.20	23.00	38:29.83	2:03:53.01	14

== Volleyball ==
=== Beach ===
Athlete	Event	Preliminary round	Preliminary elimination		Round of 16	Quarterfinals	Semifinals	Final / BM	
Athlete	Event	Opposition Result	Opposition Result	Opposition Result	Opposition Result	Opposition Result	Opposition Result	Opposition Result	Rank
Yuki Ishizaka; Rii Seike	Women's	Takahashi / Saiki (JPN); L 3–15	Gattelli / Perrotta (ITA); L 5–15	Did not advance					
Yukiko Takahashi; Mika Saiki	Women's	Ishizaka / Seike (JPN); W 15–3	Bye		Celbová / Dosoudilová (CZE); W 15–2	Davis / Johnson Jordan (USA); W 15–9	Shelda / Behar (BRA); L 10–15	Pires / Samuel (BRA); L 4–12, 6–12	4

== Weightlifting ==
Men

Athlete	Event	Snatch		Clean & Jerk		Total	
Athlete	Event	Weight	Rank	Weight	Rank	Weight	Rank
Yasuji Kikuzuma	–56 kg	105.0	16	145.0	11	250.0	15
Koki Tagashira	–56 kg	112.5	13	140.0	14	252.5	13
Hiroshi Ikehata	–62 kg	135.0	7	165.0	5	300.0	6
Yoshihisa Miyaji	–69 kg	150.0	5	170.0	11	320.0	11
Hisaya Yoshimoto	+105 kg	180.0	13	DNF			

Women

Athlete	Event	Snatch		Clean & Jerk		Total	
Athlete	Event	Weight	Rank	Weight	Rank	Weight	Rank
Kaori Niyanagi	–48 kg	75.0	7	100.0	3	175.0	6
Mari Nakaga	–53 kg	77.5	9	105.0	7	182.5	7
Yuriko Takahashi	–58 kg	85.0	9	DNF			

== Wrestling ==
Key:

- TO – Victory by Fall.
- SP – Decision by technical superiority (10 points difference) – the loser with technical points
- ST – Decision by technical superiority (10 points difference) – the loser without technical points
- PP – Decision by Points – the loser with technical points.
- PO – Decision by Points – the loser without technical points.
- VA – Victory by injury.

Greco-Roman

Athlete	Event	Elimination pool				Quarterfinals	Semifinals	Final / BM	
Athlete	Event	Opposition Result	Opposition Result	Opposition Result	Rank	Opposition Result	Opposition Result	Opposition Result	Rank
Makoto Sasamoto	58 kg	Nazaryan (BUL); L 0-4^{ST}	Gukulov (TKM); W 3–1^{PP}	Cash (AUS); W 4–0^{ST}	2	Did not advance			
Yasutoshi Motoki	63 kg	Motzer (SUI); L 1–3^{PP}	Kamyshenko (UKR); L 1–3^{PP}	Amani (NZL); W 4–0^{ST}	3	Did not advance			
Katsuhiko Nagata	69 kg	Biktyakov (UZB); W 3–1^{PP}	Sims (USA); W 3–1^{PP}	—N/a	1 Q	Bye	Glushkov (RUS); W 3–1^{PP}	Azcuy (CUB); L 0–4^{ST}	2nd place, silver medalist(s)
Takamitsu Katayama	76 kg	Kardanov (RUS); L 0–3^{PO}	Berzicza (HUN); L 1–3^{PP}	—N/a	3	Did not advance			

Freestyle

Athlete	Event	Elimination pool				Quarterfinals	Semifinals	Final / BM	
Athlete	Event	Opposition Result	Opposition Result	Opposition Result	Rank	Opposition Result	Opposition Result	Opposition Result	Rank
Chikara Tanabe	54 kg	Henson (USA); L 1–3^{PP}	Moon (KOR); W 3–1^{PP}	—N/a	2	Did not advance			
Kazuyuki Miyata	63 kg	Ortiz (CUB); L 1–3^{PP}	Tushishvili (GEO); W 3–1^{PP}	—N/a	2	Did not advance			
Takahiro Wada	69 kg	Zazirov (UKR); L 1–3^{PP}	Diaconu (MDA); W 3–1^{PP}	—N/a	3	Did not advance			
Tatsuo Kawai	85 kg	Bichinashvili (UKR); L 1–3^{PP}	Ibragimov (MKD); L 0–4^{TO}	—N/a	3	Did not advance			

== Notes ==
- Wallechinsky, David (2004). The Complete Book of the Summer Olympics (Athens 2004 Edition). Toronto, Canada. ISBN 1-894963-32-6.
- International Olympic Committee (2001). The Results. Retrieved 12 November 2005.
- Sydney Organising Committee for the Olympic Games (2001). Official Report of the XXVII Olympiad Volume 1: Preparing for the Games. Retrieved 20 November 2005.
- Sydney Organising Committee for the Olympic Games (2001). Official Report of the XXVII Olympiad Volume 2: Celebrating the Games. Retrieved 20 November 2005.
- Sydney Organising Committee for the Olympic Games (2001). The Results. Retrieved 20 November 2005.
- International Olympic Committee Web Site
