= Softball at the 2000 Summer Olympics =

Softball at the Games of the XXVII Olympiad
- Venue: Blacktown Olympic Centre
- Dates: 17–26 September 2000
- Teams: 8

Medalists
1st place, gold medalist(s)		United States
2nd place, silver medalist(s)		Japan
3rd place, bronze medalist(s)		Australia

Final results for the Softball competition at the 2000 Summer Olympics:

== Medals ==
Gold	Silver	Bronze
United States Laura Berg; Lisa Fernandez; Lori Harrigan; Michele Smith; Christie Ambrosi; Jennifer Brundage; Crystl Bustos; Sheila Cornell; Danielle Henderson; Jennifer McFalls; Stacey Nuveman; Leah O'Brien; Dot Richardson; Michelle Venturella; Christa Lee Williams	Japan Misako Ando; Yumiko Fujii; Taeko Ishikawa; Kazue Ito; Yoshimi Kobayashi; Shiori Koseki; Mariko Masubuchi; Naomi Matsumoto; Emi Naito; Haruka Saito; Juri Takayama; Hiroko Tamoto; Reika Utsugi; Miyo Yamada; Noriko Yamaji	Australia Joanne Brown; Kerry Dienelt; Peta Edebone; Tanya Harding; Melanie Roche; Natalie Ward; Brooke Wilkins; Sandra Allen; Sue Fairhurst; Selina Follas; Fiona Hanes; Kelly Hardie; Sally McDermid; Simmone Morrow; Natalie Titcume

== Schedule ==
Starting on 17 September, there were four preliminary games each day until 23 September for a total of 28 games. Two semi-final games played 25 September, with the game for third place same day. The final game for the gold medal played on 26 September at 7:30 pm local time.

== Competition format ==
Eight teams competed in the Olympic softball tournament, and the competition consisted of two rounds. The preliminary round followed a round robin format, where each of the teams played all the other teams once. Following this, the top four teams advanced to a Page playoff system round consisting of two semifinal games, and finally the bronze and gold medal games.

== Group stage ==
Qualified for the semifinals
Eliminated

The top four teams advanced to the semifinal round.

Team	W	L	RS	RA	WIN%	GB	Tiebreaker
Japan	7	0	18	7	1.000	–	–
Australia	6	1	22	5	.857	1.0	–
China	5	2	26	4	.714	2.0	–
United States	4	3	19	6	.571	3.0	–
Italy	2	5	3	27	.286	5.0	1–0 vs. NZL
New Zealand	2	5	12	22	.286	5.0	0–1 vs. ITA
Cuba	1	6	13	18	.143	6.0	1–0 vs. CAN
Canada	1	6	6	30	.143	6.0	0–1 vs. CUB

=== Games ===
17 September

Blacktown Olympic Centre
Team	1	2	3	4	5	6	7	R	H	E
Canada	0	0	0	0	0	0	0	0	0	4
United States	1	0	2	0	2	1	—	6	10	1
WP: Lori Harrigan (1–0) LP: Vicky Bastarache (0–1); Home runs: CAN: None; USA: Dot Richardson (1), Crystl Bustos (1), Jennifer Brundage (1)

Blacktown Olympic Centre
Team	1	2	3	4	5	6	7	R	H	E
Italy	0	0	0	0	0	0	0	0	3	4
China	0	0	0	2	3	0	—	5	6	0
WP: Wang Lihong (1–0) LP: Susan Bugliarello (0–1) Sv: Zhang Yanqing (1)

Blacktown Olympic Centre
Team	1	2	3	4	5	6	7	R	H	E
Cuba	0	0	0	0	0	0	1	1	3	3
Japan	1	1	0	2	0	0	—	4	6	0
WP: Juri Takayama (1–0) LP: Estela Milanés (0–1)

Blacktown Olympic Centre
Team	1	2	3	4	5	6	7	8	9	10	R	H	E
New Zealand	0	0	1	0	0	0	0	0	0	1	2	4	1
Australia	0	0	1	0	0	0	0	0	0	2	3	6	0
WP: Melanie Roche (1–0) LP: Gina Weber (0–1); Home runs: NZL: None; AUS: Peta Edebone (1)

=== Preliminary round ===
17 September	10:30	Canada	0	–	6	United States
17 September	13:00	Italy	0	–	5	China PR
17 September	17:30	Cuba	1	–	4	Japan
17 September	20:00	New Zealand	2	–	3	Australia	IN 10 INNINGS
18 September	10:30	China PR	1	–	3	Japan
18 September	13:00	Cuba	0	–	3	United States
18 September	17:30	New Zealand	3	–	2	Canada	IN 10 INNINGS
18 September	20:00	Australia	7	–	0	Italy
19 September	10:30	Japan	2	–	1	United States
19 September	13:00	Italy	1	–	0	Cuba
19 September	17:30	New Zealand	0	–	10	China PR	MERCY RULE, BOTTOM 6TH
19 September	20:00	Australia	1	–	0	Canada
20 September	10:30	New Zealand	6	–	2	Cuba
20 September	13:00	Japan	1	–	0	Australia	IN 8 INNINGS
20 September	17:30	Canada	7	–	1	Italy
20 September	20:00	China PR	2	–	0	United States	IN 14 INNINGS
21 September	10:30	New Zealand	0	–	1	Italy
21 September	13:00	United States	1	–	2	Australia	IN 13 INNINGS
21 September	17:30	Cuba	0	–	7	China PR
21 September	20:00	Japan	4	–	3	Canada	IN 10 INNINGS
22 September	10:30	United States	2	–	0	New Zealand
22 September	13:00	Canada	1	–	2	Cuba
22 September	17:30	China PR	0	–	1	Australia
22 September	20:00	Japan	2	–	0	Italy	IN 8 INNINGS
23 September	10:30	Australia	8	–	1	Cuba
23 September	13:00	China PR	1	–	0	Canada
23 September	17:30	New Zealand	1	–	2	Japan
23 September	20:00	United States	6	–	0	Italy

=== Semi finals ===
25 September	9:30	Japan	1	–	0	Australia
25 September	12:00	China PR	0	–	3	United States

=== Final ===
25 September	19:30	Australia	0	–	1	United States

=== Grand final ===
26 September	19:30	Japan	1	–	2	United States	IN 8 INNINGS

== Medal round ==
The loser of 1&2 seed game played the winner of the 3&4 seed game in the bronze medal match. The loser of the bronze medal match won the bronze medal while the winner went on to play the winner of the 1&2 seed game for the gold medal in the gold medal match.

Semifinals
1	Japan	1
2	Australia	0
3	China	0
4	United States	3 10

Bronze medal game
2	Australia	0
4	United States	1

Gold medal game
1	Japan	1
4	United States	2 8

== Final team standings ==
Rank	Team	Games	Wins	Losses
Gold medal	United States	10	7	3
Silver medal	Japan	9	8	1
Bronze medal	Australia	9	6	3
4	China	8	5	3
5	Italy	7	2	5
6	New Zealand	7	2	5
7	Cuba	7	1	6
8	Canada	7	1	6
