= Zhang Yanqing =

Zhang Yanqing may refer to:

- Zhang Yanqing (softball)
- Zhang Yanqing (politician, born 1898)
