= Egami =

Egami (written: 江上, 繪上, etc.) is a Japanese surname. Notable people with the surname include:

- Ayano Egami (江上 綾乃, born 1980), Japanese synchronized swimmer
- Shigeru Egami (江上 茂, 1912–1981), Japanese karateka
