= Ruta Lealamanua =

New Zealand softball player

Personal information
- Born: 22 October 1974 (age 51)

Sport
- Country: New Zealand
- Sport: Softball

Ruta Lealamanua (born 22 October 1974) is a New Zealand softball player. She competed at the 2000 Summer Olympics in Sydney, where the New Zealand team placed sixth in the women's softball tournament.
