= Heather Newsham =

Canadian softball player

Personal information
- Born: 30 July 1977 (age 48) Winnipeg, Manitoba, Canada

Sport
- Sport: Softball

Heather Newsham (born 30 July 1977) is a Canadian softball player. She competed in the women's tournament at the 2000 Summer Olympics.
