= Sue Fairhurst =

Australian softball player

Sue Fairhurst
Medal record

Representing Australia

Women's Softball

Olympic Games
Bronze medal – third place	1996 Sydney	Team
Bronze medal – third place	2000 Sydney	Team

Suzanne Fairhurst (born 9 July 1974 in Manchester, England) is a former softball player from Australia who won a bronze medal at the 1996 Summer Olympics and 2000 Summer Olympics.

Fairhurst is a professional golfer sponsored by Club Hart.
