= Sheila Cornell-Douty =

American softball player

Personal information
- Full name: Sheila Marie Cornell-Douty
- Born: Sheila Marie Cornell; February 26, 1962 (age 64) Encino, California, U.S.
- Height: 5 ft 10 in (178 cm)
Medal record
Women's softball
Representing the United States
Olympic Games
Gold medal – first place	1996 Atlanta	Team competition
Gold medal – first place	2000 Sydney	Team competition

Sheila Marie Cornell-Douty (born February 26, 1962) is an American former two-time gold medal winning Olympian and former college softball player for UCLA. She won two National Championships with UCLA in 1982 and 1984. After graduating from UCLA she played for the Stratford Brakettes from 1988 through 1994. She also competed at the 1996 Summer Olympics in Atlanta where she received a gold medal with the American team. She was also a member of the American gold winning team at the 2000 Summer Olympics in Sydney. She was inducted into the National Softball Hall of Fame and Museum in 2006, and the International Softball Federation Hall of Fame in 2007.

== Statistics ==
=== UCLA Bruins ===
YEAR	G	AB	R	H	BA	RBI	HR	3B	2B	TB	SLG	BB	SO	SB	SBA
1982	37	116	7	25	.215	7	0	0	8	33	.284%	6	6	0	0
1983	47	146	17	33	.226	18	2	6	2	53	.363%	15	17	2	2
1984	52	139	17	43	.309	9	2	5	6	65	.467%	26	24	6	6
TOTALS	136	401	41	101	.252	34	4	11	16	151	.376%	47	47	8	8

=== Team USA ===
Olympic Games
YEAR	G	AB	R	H	BA	RBI	HR	3B	2B	TB	SLG	BB	SO	SB
1996	9	28	5	11	.393	9	3	0	2	22	.785%	4	4	0
2000	9	32	4	5	.156	3	1	0	1	9	.281%	6	14	0
TOTALS	18	60	9	16	.266	12	4	0	3	31	.516%	10	18	0
