= Kerry Dienelt =

Australian softball player

Medal record

Representing Australia

Women's Softball

Olympic Games
| Bronze medal – third place | 1996 Atlanta | Team |
| Bronze medal – third place | 2000 Sydney | Team |

Kerry Dienelt (born 25 February 1969, in Darwin, Northern Territory) is a former softball catcher from Australia, who won a bronze medal at the 1996 Summer Olympics and 2000 Summer Olympics.

In addition to playing for the Australian national team, she also played for UCLA from 1988 to 1991. She was a member of the NCAA championship squad in 1988, 1989 and 1990 and made the All-tournament team all four years. In 2004, Dienelt was inducted into the Softball Australia Hall of Fame.
