= Joanne Brown =

Australian softball player

Medal record

Representing Australia

Women's Softball

Olympic Games
Bronze medal – third place	1996 Atlanta	Team
Bronze medal – third place	2000 Sydney	Team

Joanne Brown (born 7 April 1972 in Canberra) is an Australian former softball catcher and outfielder, who won a bronze medal at the 1996 Summer Olympics and 2000 Summer Olympics.

She was inducted into the Softball Australia Hall of Fame in 2004 and the International Softball Federation Hall of Fame in 2005.

She played for the UCLA Bruins from 1991 -1993 and was a 1992 NCAA All American playing for the UCLA Bruins who won the 1992 NCAA Softball title.

She has played 244 games for the Australian National Softball Team since her debut in 1990.

Her famous walk-off homerun against the U.S. team in an Olympic preliminary round in the 1996 Olympics garnered the attention of numerous softball executives in the United States. She was offered a contract for the inaugural season of WPF and played in 18 games for the Durham Dragons before returning to Australia.
