= Zhang Yanqing (softball) =

Chinese softball player

Personal information
- Born: October 14, 1978 (age 47)
- Height: 174 cm (5 ft 9 in)
Medal record
Women's softball
Representing China
Asian Games
| Gold medal – first place | 1998 Bangkok | Team |
| Silver medal – second place | 2002 Busan | Team |

Zhang Yanqing (simplified Chinese: 张艳清; traditional Chinese: 張艷清; pinyin: Zhāng Yànqīng; born October 14, 1978) is a female Chinese softball player. She competed in the 2000 Summer Olympics.

In the 2000 Olympic softball competition, she finished fourth with the Chinese team. She played seven matches as pitcher.
