= Selina Follas =

Australian softball player

Medal record

Representing Australia

Women's Softball

Olympic Games
Bronze medal – third place	2000 Sydney	Team

Selina Follas (born 21 Jule 1976 in Adelaide) is a former softball player from Australia, who won a bronze medal at the 2000 Summer Olympics.
