= Christie Ambrosi =

American softball player

Personal information
- Born: December 21, 1976 (age 49) Overland Park, Kansas, U.S.
- Height: 5 ft 8 in (173 cm)
Medal record
Women's softball
Representing the United States
Olympic Games
Gold medal – first place	2000 Sydney	Softball

Christie Ambrosi (born December 21, 1976) is an American, former collegiate All-American, gold-medal winning Olympian, right-handed softball player and current Head Coach, originally from Overland Park, Kansas. She attended high school at Blue Valley Northwest High School. Ambrosi was a shortstop and outfielder for the UCLA Bruins in the now-named Pac-12 Conference from 1996–97, 99, winning a national title in her final year and was named All-Tournament. She later helped Team USA to a gold medal in the Sydney Olympics. Ambrosi held several coaching positions and is now head of the SVSU Cardinals softball team.

== Career ==
She competed at the 2000 Summer Olympics in Sydney where she received a gold medal as a member of the American winning team. Ambrosi contributed a hit and RBI at the games.

Christie attended UCLA, where she was All-American all four years, and won the division 1 National Championship. She has a gold medal from the 2000 Olympic Games, and the Pan-American Games.

Christie recently played in the Celebrity All-Star slow pitch game hosted at Community America Park in Kansas City, Kansas.

No longer with SVSU

== Statistics ==
=== UCLA Bruins ===
YEAR	G	AB	R	H	BA	RBI	HR	3B	2B	TB	SLG	BB	SO	SB	SBA
1996	58	178	35	55	.309	35	1	0	6	64	.359%	18	11	3	3
1997	58	204	43	70	.343	22	0	6	10	92	.451%	13	7	5	6
1999	68	240	65	103	.429	48	10	4	14	155	.646%	19	14	25	28
TOTALS	184	622	143	228	.366	105	11	10	30	311	.500%	50	32	33	37
