= Kazue Ito (softball) =

Japanese softball player (born 1977)

Medal record

Women's softball

Representing Japan

Olympic Games
Silver medal – second place	2000 Sydney	Team competition
Bronze medal – third place	2004 Athens	Team competition

Kazue Ito (伊藤 良恵, Itō Kazue) (born 22 December 1977 in Kanagawa / grew up in Tatebayashi, Gunma) is a Japanese softball player at first base. She won a silver medal at the 2000 Summer Olympics, and a bronze medal in the 2004 Summer Olympics.
