= Yuko Yoneda =

Japanese synchronized swimmer

Personal information
- Born: September 8, 1979 (age 46)

Sport
- Sport: Synchronised swimming
Medal record
Representing Japan
Synchronized swimming
Silver medal – second place	2000 Sydney	Team
World Championships
Silver medal – second place	1998 Perth	Team

Yuko Yoneda (born 8 September 1979) is a Japanese synchronized swimmer who competed in the 2000 Summer Olympics. She is the younger sister of Yoko Yoneda who is also a synchronized swimmer.
