= Miyo Yamada =

Japanese softball player (born 1976)

Miyo Yamada (山田 美葉, Yamada Miyō) (born September 11, 1976) is a Japanese softball player who played as a catcher. She won the silver medal for Japan in the 2000 Summer Olympics.
