= Naomi Matsumoto (softball) =

Japanese softball player (born 1968)

Naomi Matsumoto (松本 直美, Matsumoto Naomi) (born February 24, 1968) is a Japanese softball player who played as a Right field in the 1996 Summer Olympics and then the Pinch Runner in the 2000 Summer Olympics (except for the first game against Cuba, where she played in 2nd Base). She won the silver medal for Japan in 2000.
