= Mariko Masubuchi =

Japanese softball player

Mariko Masubuchi (増淵 まり子, Masubuchi Mariko) (born January 24, 1980) is a Japanese softball player who played as a pitcher. She won the silver medal for Japan in the 2000 Summer Olympics.
