= Haruka Saito =

Japanese softball player

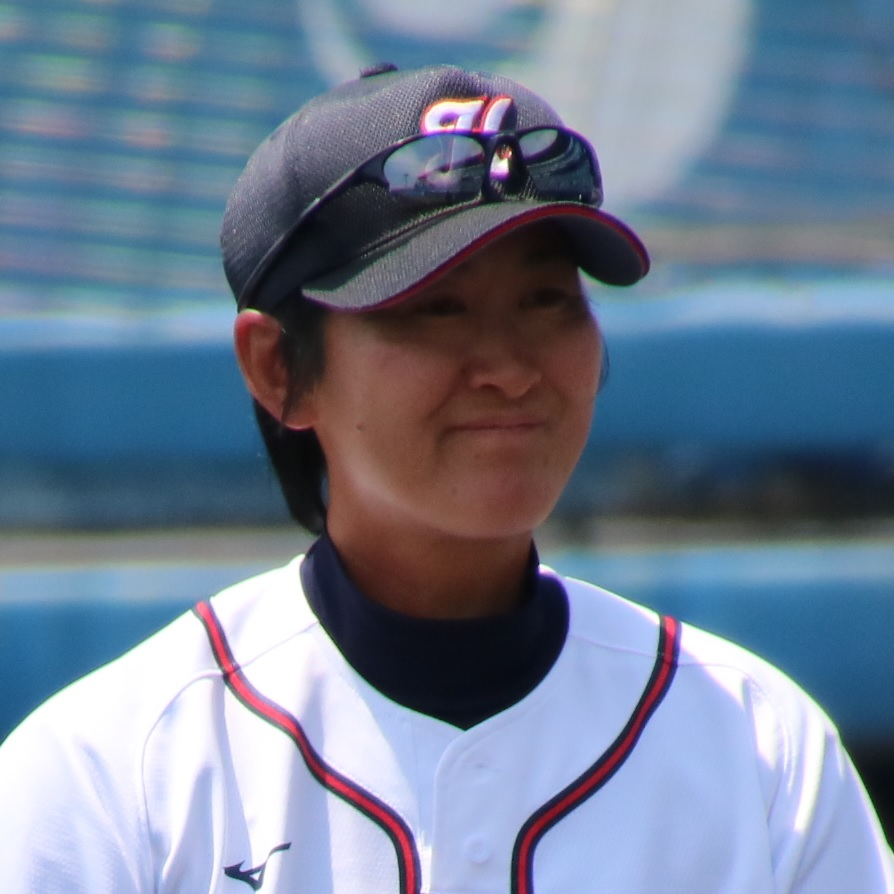
- Hitachi Sundiva of Japan Softball League, 2019

Personal information
- Native name: 斎藤 春香, Saitō Haruka
- Nationality: Japanese
- Born: March 14, 1970 (age 56) Hirosaki, Aomori Prefecture, Japan

Sport
- Country: Japan
- Sport: Softball
Medal record
Olympic Games
Silver medal – second place	2000 Sydney	Softball
Bronze medal – third place	2004 Athens	Softball

Haruka Saito (斎藤 春香, Saitō Haruka) (born March 14, 1970, in Hirosaki, Aomori, Japan) is a Japanese softball player. She played in the Hitachi softball club from 1994 to 2006 and represented Japan as part of the Japan women's national softball team in the 1996, 2000, and 2004 Olympic Games. In 2000 and 2004, she played in the teams that won the bronze and silver medals, respectively.

== Retirement ==
Following her final Olympics appearance in 2004, Saitō continued at Hitachi softball club as a playing coach until 2006, when she became the coach for the national team. She led them to the gold medal at the 2008 Olympics. In 2011, national teammate, Reika Utsugi, succeeded her as the national team coach.

She currently serves as the technical vice chair on the Japan Softball Association. On 26 June, she was selected as a board director on the Japanese Olympic Committee (JOC), a move that doubled the number of women directors.
