= Yumiko Fujii =

Japanese softball player (born 1972)

Yumiko Fujii (藤井 由宮子, Fujii Yumiko) (born April 24, 1972) is a Japanese softball player who played as a pitcher. She won the silver medal in the 2000 Summer Olympics.
