= Emi Naito =

Japanese softball player (born 1979)

Emi Naito (内藤 恵美, Naitō Emi) (born October 6, 1979) is a Japanese softball player who won two medals for Japan in the Olympic Games. In 2000 she played in 2nd base, where she won the silver medal for the team. In 2004 she played as a shortstop, in which her team received a bronze medal.
