= Shiori Koseki =

Japanese softball player

Shiori Koseki (小関 しおり, Koseki Shiori) (born June 30, 1972) is a Japanese softball player who played in the 2000 Summer Olympics mostly as a Left field, but on one occasion played as a Pinch Runner in the game against New Zealand. She won the silver medal for Japan.
