= Ayano Egami =

Japanese synchronised swimmer

Personal information
- Born: April 1, 1980 (age 46) Kyoto, Japan

Sport
- Sport: Swimming
Medal record
Representing Japan
Olympic Games
Silver medal – second place	2000 Sydney	Team

Ayano Egami (江上 綾乃, Egami Ayano) (born 1 April 1980) is a Japanese synchronised swimmer who competed in the 2000 Summer Olympics.
