= Yoshimi Kobayashi =

Japanese softball player

Yoshimi Kobayashi (小林 良美, Kobayashi Yoshimi) (born August 11, 1968) is a Japanese softball player who played for three different positions in the 2000 Summer Olympics: The pinch hitter, left field and right field. She won the silver medal for team Japan.
