= Taeko Ishikawa =

Japanese softball player (born 1975)

Taeko Ishikawa (石川 多映子, Ishikawa Taeko) (born October 14, 1975) is a Japanese softball player who played as a pitcher. She won the silver medal in the 2000 Summer Olympics.
