= Hiroko Tamoto =

Japanese softball player

Hiroko Tamoto (田本 博子, Tamoto Hiroko) (born January 3, 1974) is a Japanese softball player who played as a Center Field. She won the silver medal in the 2000 Summer Olympics.
