= Fencing at the 2000 Summer Olympics – Women's épée =

Women's épée at the Games of the XXVII Olympiad
- Venue: Sydney Exhibition Centre
- Dates: 17 September 2000
- Competitors: 39 from 22 nations

Medalists
1st place, gold medalist(s)		Tímea Nagy	Hungary
2nd place, silver medalist(s)		Gianna Hablützel-Bürki	Switzerland
3rd place, bronze medalist(s)		Laura Flessel-Colovic	France

The women's épée was one of ten fencing events on the fencing at the 2000 Summer Olympics programme. It was the second appearance of the event. The competition was held on 17 September 2000. 39 fencers from 22 nations competed.

== Main tournament bracket ==
The field of 39 fencers from 22 nations competed in a single-elimination tournament to determine the medal winners. Semifinal losers proceeded to a bronze medal match.

1st Round
1	Ildikó Nébaldné Mincza; Hungary	Bye
64	–	-
33	Zahra Gamir; Algeria	2
32	Arlene Stevens; United States	5
17	Mirayda García; Cuba	Bye
48	–	-
49	Gianna Hablützel-Bürki; Switzerland	Bye
16	–	-
9	Zuleydis Ortiz; Cuba	Bye
56	–	-
41	Tamara Esteri; Cuba	Bye
24	–	-
25	Diana Romagnoli; Switzerland	Bye
40	–	-
57	Margrete Mørch; Norway	Bye
8	–	-
5	Cristiana Cascioli; Italy	Bye
60	–	-
37	Sophie Lamon; Switzerland	15
28	Ángela María Espinosa; Colombia	9
21	Tatyana Logunova; Russia	Bye
44	–	-
53	Go Jeong-Jeon; South Korea	Bye
12	–	-
13	Valérie Barlois-Mevel-Leroux; France	Bye
52	–	-
45	Katja Nass; Germany	15
20	Anisa Petrova; Uzbekistan	8
29	Sherraine Schalm-MacKay; Canada	Bye
36	–	-
61	Sangita Tripathi; France	Bye
4	–	-
3	Gyöngyi Szalay-Horváth; Hungary	Bye
62	–	-
35	Jūlija Vansoviča; Latvia	15
30	Cáterin Bravo; Chile	5
19	Yang Shaoqi; China	Bye
46	–	-
51	Tímea Nagy; Hungary	Bye
14	–	-
11	Imke Duplitzer; Germany	Bye
54	–	-
43	Li Na; China	15
22	May Moustafa; Egypt	5
27	Ragnhild Andenæs; Norway	Bye
38	–	-
59	–	-
6	Claudia Bokel; Germany	Bye
7	Mariya Mazina; Russia	Bye
58	–	-
39	Karina Aznavuryan; Russia	15
26	Nataliya Goncharova; Kazakhstan	13
23	–	-
42	Liang Qin; China	Bye
55	–	-
10	Margherita Zalaffi; Italy	-Bye
15	Evelyn Halls; Australia	-Bye
50	–	-
47	–	-
18	Andrea Rentmeister; Austria	-Bye
31	Tamara Savić-Šotra; FR Yugoslavia	15
34	Silvia Lesoil; Norway	8
63	–	-
2	Laura Flessel-Colovic; France	-Bye

2nd Round
Ildikó Nébaldné Mincza; Hungary	11
Arlene Stevens; United States	8
Mirayda García; Cuba	14
Gianna Hablützel-Bürki; Switzerland	15
Zuleydis Ortiz; Cuba	15
Tamara Esteri; Cuba	7
Diana Romagnoli; Switzerland	15
Margrete Mørch; Norway	13
Cristiana Cascioli; Italy	12
Sophie Lamon; Switzerland	15
Tatyana Logunova; Russia	15
Go Jeong-Jeon; South Korea	9
Valérie Barlois-Mevel-Leroux; France	15
Katja Nass; Germany	12
Sherraine Schalm-MacKay; Canada	13
Sangita Tripathi; France	15
Gyöngyi Szalay-Horváth; Hungary	13
Jūlija Vansoviča; Latvia	15
Yang Shaoqi; China	8
Tímea Nagy; Hungary	11
Imke Duplitzer; Germany	15
Li Na; China
Ragnhild Andenæs; Norway	10
Claudia Bokel; Germany	15
Mariya Mazina; Russia	15
Karina Aznavuryan; Russia	11
Liang Qin; China	11
Margherita Zalaffi; Italy	15
Evelyn Halls; Australia	14
Andrea Rentmeister; Austria	15
Tamara Savić-Šotra; FR Yugoslavia	9
Laura Flessel-Colovic; France	15

3rd Round
Ildikó Nébaldné Mincza; Hungary	9
Gianna Hablützel-Bürki; Switzerland	15
Zuleydis Ortiz; Cuba	15
Diana Romagnoli; Switzerland	11
Sophie Lamon; Switzerland	8
Tatyana Logunova; Russia	15
Valérie Barlois-Mevel-Leroux; France	15
Sangita Tripathi; France	8
Jūlija Vansoviča; Latvia	10
Tímea Nagy; Hungary	15
Imke Duplitzer; Germany	14
Claudia Bokel; Germany	15
Mariya Mazina; Russia	13
Margherita Zalaffi; Italy	15
Andrea Rentmeister; Austria	12
Laura Flessel-Colovic; France	15

Quarterfinals
Gianna Hablützel-Bürki; Switzerland	15
Zuleydis Ortiz; Cuba	14
Tatyana Logunova; Russia	15
Valérie Barlois-Mevel-Leroux; France	10
Tímea Nagy; Hungary	15
Claudia Bokel; Germany	8
Margherita Zalaffi; Italy	11
Laura Flessel-Colovic; France	15

Semifinals
Gianna Hablützel-Bürki; Switzerland	13
Tatyana Logunova; Russia	12
Tímea Nagy; Hungary	15
Laura Flessel-Colovic; France	14

Gold medal final
Gianna Hablützel-Bürki; Switzerland	11
Tímea Nagy; Hungary	15

=== Bronze medal final ===
Laura Flessel-Colovic (FRA)	15–6	Tatyana Logunova (RUS)

== Results ==
Rank	Fencer	Country
1st place, gold medalist(s)	Tímea Nagy	Hungary
2nd place, silver medalist(s)	Gianna Hablützel-Bürki	Switzerland
3rd place, bronze medalist(s)	Laura Flessel-Colovic	France
4	Tatyana Logunova	Russia
5	Valérie Barlois-Mevel-Leroux	France
6	Zuleydis Ortiz	Cuba
7	Margherita Zalaffi	Italy
8	Claudia Bokel	Germany
9	Ildikó Mincza-Nébald	Hungary
10	Imke Duplitzer	Germany
11	Mariya Mazina	Russia
12	Diana Romagnoli	Switzerland
13	Andrea Rentmeister	Austria
14	Sangita Tripathi	France
15	Sophie Lamon	Switzerland
16	Jūlija Vansoviča	Latvia
17	Cristiana Cascioli	Italy
18	Gyöngyi Szalay-Horváth	Hungary
19	Sherraine Schalm-MacKay	Canada
20	Evelyn Halls	Australia
21	Mirayda García	Cuba
22	Go Jeong-Jeon	South Korea
23	Yang Shaoqi	China
24	Ragnhild Andenæs	Norway
25	Liang Qin	China
26	Margrete Mørch	Norway
27	Tamara Esteri	Cuba
28	Karina Aznavuryan	Russia
29	Katja Nass	Germany
30	Li Na	China
31	Tamara Savić-Šotra	FR Yugoslavia
32	Arlene Stevens	United States
33	Silvia Lesoil	Norway
34	Zahra Gamir	Algeria
35	Ángela María Espinosa	Colombia
36	Cáterin Bravo	Chile
37	Anisa Petrova	Uzbekistan
38	Nataliya Goncharova	Kazakhstan
39	May Moustafa	Egypt
