= Fencing at the 2000 Summer Olympics – Women's team épée =

Fencing at the Olympics

Women's team épée at the Games of the XXVII Olympiad
- Venue: Sydney Exhibition Centre
- Dates: 19 September
- Competitors: 26 from 8 nations

Medalists
1st place, gold medalist(s)		Karina Aznavuryan; Tatyana Logunova; Mariya Mazina; Oksana Yermakova	Russia
2nd place, silver medalist(s)		Gianna Hablützel-Bürki; Sophie Lamon; Diana Romagnoli	Switzerland
3rd place, bronze medalist(s)		Li Na; Liang Qin; Yang Shaoqi	China

The women's team épée was one of ten fencing events on the fencing at the 2000 Summer Olympics programme. It was the second appearance of the event. The competition was held on 19 September 2000. 26 fencers from 8 nations competed.

== Medalists ==
Gold:	Silver:	Bronze:
Russia; Karina Aznavuryan; Tatyana Logunova; Mariya Mazina; Oksana Yermakova	Switzerland; Gianna Hablützel-Bürki; Sophie Lamon; Diana Romagnoli	China; Li Na; Liang Qin; Yang Shaoqi

=== Main tournament bracket ===
The field of 8 teams competed in a single-elimination tournament to determine the medal winners. Semifinal losers proceeded to a bronze medal match. Matches were also conducted to determine the final team placements.

Quarterfinals
Hungary; Tímea Nagy; Ildikó Nébaldné Mincza; Gyöngyi Szalay-Horváth	45
Norway; Margrete Mørch; Ragnhild Andenæs; Silvia Lesoil	32
Germany; Katja Nass; Imke Duplitzer; Claudia Bokel	43
Russia; Tatyana Logunova; Mariya Mazina; Karina Aznavuryan	45
Switzerland; Gianna Hablützel-Bürki; Sophie Lamon; Diana Romagnoli	45
Cuba; Tamara Esteri; Zuleydis Ortiz; Mirayda García	38
China; Li Na; Liang Qin; Yang Shaoqi	45
France; Valérie Barlois-Mevel-Leroux; Laura Flessel-Colovic; Sangita Tripathi	42

Semifinals
Hungary; Tímea Nagy; Ildikó Nébaldné Mincza; Gyöngyi Szalay-Horváth	44
Russia; Tatyana Logunova; Mariya Mazina; Karina Aznavuryan	45
Switzerland; Gianna Hablützel-Bürki; Sophie Lamon; Diana Romagnoli	45
China; Li Na; Liang Qin; Yang Shaoqi	33

Gold Medal Final
Russia; Tatyana Logunova; Mariya Mazina; Oksana Yermakova	45
Switzerland; Gianna Hablützel-Bürki; Sophie Lamon; Diana Romagnoli	35
Bronze Medal match
Hungary; Tímea Nagy; Ildikó Nébaldné Mincza; Gyöngyi Szalay-Horváth	39
China; Li Na; Liang Qin; Yang Shaoqi	41

=== Classification 5-8 ===
Placement 5-6
Norway; Margrete Mørch; Ragnhild Andenæs; Silvia Lesoil	39
Germany; Katja Nass; Imke Duplitzer; Claudia Bokel	45
Cuba; Tamara Esteri; Zuleydis Ortiz; Mirayda García	39
France; Valérie Barlois-Mevel-Leroux; Laura Flessel-Colovic; Sangita Tripathi	45

Fifth place match
Germany; Katja Nass; Imke Duplitzer; Claudia Bokel	33
France; Valérie Barlois-Mevel-Leroux; Laura Flessel-Colovic; Sophie Moressée-Pichot	45
Seventh place match
Norway; Margrete Mørch; Ragnhild Andenæs; Silvia Lesoil	32
Cuba; Tamara Esteri; Zuleydis Ortiz; Mirayda García	45
