= Switzerland at the 2000 Summer Olympics =

- IOC code: SUI
- NOC: Swiss Olympic Association
- Website: www.swissolympic.ch (in German and French)

in Sydney
- Competitors: 102 (64 men, 38 women) in 19 sports
- Flag bearer: Thomas Frischknecht
- Medals Ranked 37th: Gold 1 Silver 6 Bronze 2 Total 9

Summer Olympics appearances (overview)
- 1896; 1900; ~~1904~~; 1908; 1912; 1920; 1924; 1928; 1932; 1936; 1948; 1952; 1956; 1960; 1964; 1968; 1972; 1976; 1980; 1984; 1988; 1992; 1996; 2000; 2004; 2008; 2012; 2016; 2020; 2024; 2028

Other related appearances
- 1906 Intercalated Games

Switzerland competed at the 2000 Summer Olympics in Sydney, Australia. 102 competitors, 64 men and 38 women, took part in 82 events in 19 sports.

Sydney 2000 marked the first time the Swiss Olympic team competed in Australia as Switzerland and other European nations boycotted the 1956 Summer Olympics in Melbourne due to the Soviet invasion of Hungary but Switzerland did take part in the Equestrian events at the 1956 Summer Olympics in Stockholm five months earlier.

== Medalists ==
Medal	Name	Sport	Event	Date
Gold	Brigitte McMahon	Triathlon	Women's individual	
Silver	Barbara Blatter	Cycling	Women's mountainbike cross country	
Silver	Markus Fuchs; Beat Mändli; Lesley McNaught; Willi Melliger	Equestrian	Team Jumping	
Silver	Gianna Hablützel-Bürki	Fencing	Women's épée	
Silver	Gianna Hablützel-Bürki; Sophie Lamon; Diana Romagnoli	Fencing	Women's team épée	
Silver	Xeno Müller	Rowing	Men's single sculls	
Silver	Michel Ansermet	Shooting	Men's 25 metre rapid fire pistol	
Bronze	Magali Messmer	Triathlon	Women's individual	
Bronze	Christoph Sauser	Cycling	Men's mountainbike cross country	

== Athletics ==
=== Men's competition ===
Men's 800m

- André Bucher

- Round 1 – 01:46.51
- Semifinal – 01:44.38
- Final – 01:45.40 (5th place)

Men's 110m Hurdles

- Paolo Della Santa

- Round 1 – 14.12 (did not advance)

- Raphael Monachon

- Round 1 – 14.8 (did not advance)

Men's 4 × 400 m

- Nicolas Baeriswyl, André Bucher, Laurent Clerc, Alain Rohr

- Round 1 – 03:06.01 (did not advance)

Men's 3,000m Steeplechase

- Christian Belz

- Round 1 – 08:33.45 (did not advance)

Men's Marathon

- Viktor Roethlin

- Final – 2:20:06 (36th place)

Men's Decathlon

- Philipp Huber

- 100m – 11.35
- Long Jump – DNS
- Shot Put – DNS

=== Women's competition ===
Women's 100m

- Mireille Donders

- Round 1 – 11.63 (did not advance)

Women's 200m

- Mireille Donders

- Round 1 – 23.44 (did not advance)

Women's 1,500m

- Anita Wyermann

- Round 1 – 04:09.28
- Semifinal – 04:30.80 (did not advance)

- Sabine Fischer

- Round 1 – 04:10.78
- Semifinal – 04:06.67
- Final – 04:08.84 (9th place)

Women's Marathon

- Daria Nauer

- Final – 2:43:00 (38th place)

== Beach volleyball ==
- Martin Laciga and Paul Laciga – 5th place (tied)

== Canoeing ==
=== Flatwater ===
==== Men's competition ====
Men's Kayak Singles 500m

- Adrian Hermann Bachmann

- Qualifying Heat – 01:45.187 (did not advance)

Men's Kayak Singles 1000m

- Adrian Hermann Bachmann

- Qualifying Heat – 03:45.705
- Semifinal – 03:47.479 (did not advance)

=== Slalom ===
==== Men's competition ====
Men's Kayak Singles

- Mathias Roethenmund

- Qualifying – 253.02
- Final – 227.96 (9th place)

==== Women's competition ====
Women's Kayak Singles

- Sandra Friedli

- Qualifying – 306.01
- Final – 262.30 (9th place)

== Cycling ==
=== Cross Country Mountain Bike ===
Men's Cross Country Mountain Bike

- Christoph Sauser

- Final – 2:11:21.00 (Bronze medal)

- Thomas Frischknecht

- Final – 2:12:42.49 (6th place)

- Thomas Hochstrasser

- Final – DNF

Women's Mountain Bike

- Barbara Blatter

- Final – 1:49:51.42 (Silver medal)

- Chantal Daucourt

- Final – 1:56:49.53 (11th place)

=== Road Cycling ===
==== Men's competition ====
Men's Individual Time Trial

- Alex Zülle

- Final – 1:02:34 (33rd place)

Men's Road Race

- Markus Zberg

- Final – 5:30:46 (21st place)

- Oscar Camenzind

- Final – 5:30:46 (37th place)

- Mauro Gianetti

- Final – 5:30:46 (54th place)

- Laurent Dufaux

- Final – 5:30:46 (64th place)

- Alex Zülle

- Final – 5:30:46 (68th place)

==== Women's competition ====
Women's Individual Time Trial

- Nicole Brändli

- Final – 0:45:51 (23rd place)

Women's Road Race

- Yvonne Schnorf

- Final – 3:06:31 (9th place)

- Nicole Brändli

- Final – 3:06:31 (16th place)

- Priska Doppmann

- Final – 3:10:17 (32nd place)

=== Track Cycling ===
==== Men's competition ====
Men's Individual Pursuit

- Franco Marvulli
  - Qualifying – 04:34.000 (did not advance)

Men's Point Race

- Bruno Risi
  - Points – 13
  - Laps Down – 2 (12th place)

Men's Madison

- Bruno Risi, Kurt Betschart
  - Final – 5 (11th place)

== Diving ==
Men's 3 Metre Springboard

- Jean-Romain Delaloye

- Preliminary – 292.68 (45th place, did not advance)

Women's 3 Metre Springboard

- Catherine Maliev-Aviolat

- Preliminary – 204.06 (38th place, did not advance)

Women's Synchronized 3 Metre Springboard

- Catherine Maliev-Aviolat, Jacquiline Schneider

- Final – 256.2 (8th place)

== Fencing ==
Five fencers, two men and three women, represented Switzerland in 2000.

Men's épée

- Marcel Fischer

Men's sabre

- Laurent Waller

Women's épée

- Gianna Hablützel-Bürki
- Diana Romagnoli
- Sophie Lamon

Women's team épée

- Gianna Hablützel-Bürki, Sophie Lamon, Diana Romagnoli

== Sailing ==
Switzerland had four top 20 finishes during the Sailing competition at the 2000 Sydney Olympics.

Men's Single Handed Dinghy (Finn)

- Peter Theurer

- Race 1 – 16
- Race 2 – 13
- Race 3 – (21)
- Race 4 – 4
- Race 5 – 18
- Race 6 – 19
- Race 7 – 8
- Race 8 – 20
- Race 9 – (26) DNC
- Race 10 – 4
- Race 11 – 18
- Final – 120 (18th place)

Men's Double Handed Dinghy (470)

- Lukas Erni and Simon Bruegger

- Race 1 – (30) OCS
- Race 2 – (28)
- Race 3 – 27
- Race 4 – 24
- Race 5 – 20
- Race 6 – 7
- Race 7 – 20
- Race 8 – 26
- Race 9 – 27
- Race 10 – 8
- Race 11 – 25
- Final – 184 (27th place)

Women's Mistral

- Anja Käser

- Race 1 – 14
- Race 2 – (16)
- Race 3 – 7
- Race 4 – 7
- Race 5 – 10
- Race 6 – 12
- Race 7 – 13
- Race 8 – 10
- Race 9 – 13
- Race 10 – (18)
- Race 11 – 4
- Final – 90 (12th place)

Open Two Handed Keelboat (Star)

- Flavio Marazzi and Renato Marazzi (Note: Renato and Flavio Marazzi are brothers)

- Race 2 – 14
- Race 3 – 4
- Race 4 – (17) DSQ
- Race 5 – (17) DSQ
- Race 6 – (17) DNF
- Race 7 – 16
- Race 8 – 12
- Race 9 – 6
- Race 10 – 10
- Race 11 – 5
- Final – 97 (15th place)

Open High Performance Two Handed Dinghy (49er)

- Thomas Rueegge and Claude Maurer

- Race 1 – 15
- Race 2 – 6
- Race 3 – 14
- Race 4 – 4
- Race 5 – 10
- Race 6 – (17)
- Race 7 – 8
- Race 8 – 9
- Race 9 – (17)
- Race 10 – 14
- Race 11 – 11
- Race 12 – 15
- Race 13 – 9
- Race 14 – 13
- Race 15 – 12
- Race 16 – 11
- Final – 151 (15th place)

== Swimming ==
Men's 50m Freestyle

- Christophe Bühler

- Preliminary Heat – 23.15 (→ did not advance)

Men's 100m Freestyle

- Karel Novy

- Preliminary Heat – 50.19 (→ did not advance)

Men's 100m Butterfly

- Philippe Meyer

- Preliminary Heat – 54.85 (→ did not advance)

Men's 100m Breaststroke

- Remo Lütolf

- Preliminary Heat – 01:02.54
- Final – 01:01.88 (→ 8th place)

Men's 100m Backstroke

- Philipp Gilgen

- Preliminary Heat – 57.5 (→ did not advance)

Men's 200m Individual Medley

- Yves Platel

- Preliminary Heat – 02:05.19 (→ did not advance)

Men's 400m Individual Medley

- Yves Platel

- Preliminary Heat – 04:22.38 (→ did not advance)

Men's 4 × 100 m Medley Relay

- Phillipp Gilgen, Remo Lütolf, Phillippe Meyer, and Karel Novy

- Preliminary Heat – 03:42.78 (→ did not advance)

Women's 400m Freestyle

- Flavia Rigamonti

- Preliminary Heat – 04:11.77 (→ did not advance)

- Chantal Strasser

- Preliminary Heat – 04:16.17 (→ did not advance)

Women's 800m Freestyle

- Flavia Rigamonti

- Preliminary Heat – 08:30.44
- Final – 08:25.91 (→ 4th place)

- Chantal Strasser

- Preliminary Heat – 08:35.84 (→ did not advance)

Women's 100m Breaststroke

- Agata Czaplicki

- Preliminary Heat – 01:13.19 (→ did not advance)

Women's 200m Breaststroke

- Agata Czaplicki

- Preliminary Heat – 02:32.98 (→ did not advance)

== Synchronized swimming ==
Duet

- Madeleine Perk, Belinda Schmid

- Technical Routine – 32.153
- Free Routine – 59.886
- Final – 92.039 (10th place)

== Tennis ==
Men's Singles competition:

- Roger Federer

== Triathlon ==
At the inaugural Olympic triathlon competition, Switzerland was represented by three men and three women. The women captured both the gold medal and the bronze medal, while the men added one more top eight finish.

Men's Competition:

- Reto Hug – 1:49:21.30 (→ 8th place)
- Markus Keller – 1:50:15.25 (→ 18th place)
- Jean-Christophe Guinchard – 1:50:50.76 (→ 24th place)

Women's Competition:

- Brigitte McMahon – 2:00:40.52 (→ Gold Medal)
- Magali Messmer – 2:01:08.83 (→ Bronze Medal)
- Sibylle Matter – 2:13:25.38 (→ 36th place)

== Sources ==
- Wallechinsky, David (2004). The Complete Book of the Summer Olympics (Athens 2004 Edition). Toronto, Canada. ISBN 1-894963-32-6.
- International Olympic Committee (2001). The Results. Retrieved 12 November 2005.
- Sydney Organising Committee for the Olympic Games (2001). Official Report of the XXVII Olympiad Volume 1: Preparing for the Games. Retrieved 20 November 2005.
- Sydney Organising Committee for the Olympic Games (2001). Official Report of the XXVII Olympiad Volume 2: Celebrating the Games. Retrieved 20 November 2005.
- Sydney Organising Committee for the Olympic Games (2001). The Results. Retrieved 20 November 2005.
- International Olympic Committee Web Site
