= Norway at the 2000 Summer Olympics =

- IOC code: NOR
- NOC: Norwegian Olympic Committee and Confederation of Sports
- Website: www.idrett.no (in Norwegian)

in Sydney
- Competitors: 93 (44 men, 49 women) in 15 sports
- Flag bearer: Vebjørn Rodal (athletics)
- Medals Ranked 19th: Gold 4 Silver 3 Bronze 3 Total 10

Summer Olympics appearances (overview)
- 1900; 1904; 1908; 1912; 1920; 1924; 1928; 1932; 1936; 1948; 1952; 1956; 1960; 1964; 1968; 1972; 1976; 1980; 1984; 1988; 1992; 1996; 2000; 2004; 2008; 2012; 2016; 2020; 2024

Other related appearances
- 1906 Intercalated Games

Norway was represented at the 2000 Summer Olympics in Sydney by the Norwegian Olympic Committee and Confederation of Sports. 93 competitors, 44 men and 49 women, took part in 54 events in 15 sports.

== Medalists ==
| Medal | Name | Sport | Event | Date |
|---|---|---|---|---|
| Gold | Trine Hattestad | Athletics | Women's javelin throw | 30 September |
| Gold | Knut Holmann | Canoeing | Men's K-1 500 metres | 1 October |
| Gold | Knut Holmann | Canoeing | Men's K-1 1000 metres | 30 September |
| Gold | Norway women's national football team: Anita Rapp; Hege Riise; Brit Sandaune; Dagny Mellgren; Bente Nordby; Marianne Pettersen; Gøril Kringen; Bente Kvitland; Unni Lehn; Ingeborg Hovland; Silje Jørgensen; Monica Knudsen; Ragnhild Gulbrandsen; Solveig Gulbrandsen; Margunn Haugenes; Kristin Bekkevold; Christine Boe Jensen; Gro Espeseth | Football | Women's tournament | 28 September |
| Silver | Kjersti Plätzer | Athletics | Women's 20 km walk | 28 September |
| Silver | Trude Gundersen | Taekwondo | Women's 67 kg | 29 September |
| Silver | Fredrik Bekken; Olaf Tufte | Rowing | Men's double sculls | 23 September |
| Bronze | Harald Stenvaag | Shooting | Men's 50 metre rifle three positions | 23 September |
| Bronze | Paul Davis; Herman Horn Johannessen; Espen Stokkeland | Sailing | Men's Soling Class | 30 September |
| Bronze | Norway women's national handball team: Monica Sandve; Else-Marthe Sørlie; Heidi Tjugum; Jeanette Nilsen; Marianne Rokne; Birgitte Sættem; Mia Hundvin; Tonje Larsen; Cecilie Leganger; Kjersti Grini; Trine Haltvik; Kristine Duvholt; Ann Cathrin Eriksen; Susann Goksør Bjerkrheim | Handball | Women's tournament | 1 October |

== Archery ==
In the sixth appearance by the nation in the archery competition at the Olympics, Norway represented by three men and one woman. Their combined record was 1–4. The men's team also lost their first match.

Men's individual
| | Bård Nesteng | | | Lars Erik Humlekjær | | | Martinus Grov | | |
| 1/32 eliminations | Defeated | Henk Vogels; Netherlands | 158-149 | Lost to | Michele Frangilli; Italy | 168-158 | Lost to | Matteo Bisiani; Italy | 166-158 |
| 1/16 eliminations | Lost to | Sebastien Flute; France | 160-148 | - | - | - | - | - | - |

Men's team:

- Nesteng, Humlekjær, and Grov – round of 16, 10th place

Women's individual
| | Wenche-Lin Hess | | |
| 1/32 eliminations | Lost to | Ying He; China | 160-145 |

== Athletics ==
=== Men's competition ===
Men's 200 m

- Geir Moen

- Round 1 – 20.76
- Round 2 – 20.65 (did not advance)

- John Ertzgaard

- Round 1 – 21 (did not advance)

Men's 800 m

- Vebjørn Rodal

- Round 1 – 01:46.76
- Semifinal – 01:48.73 (did not advance)

Men's 5000 m

- Marius Bakken

- Round 1 – 13:44.80 (did not advance)

Men's 3000 m steeplechase

- Jim Svenøy

- Round 1 – 08:23.61
- Final – 08:27.20 (9th place)

Men's javelin throw

- Pål-Arne Fagernes

- Qualifying – 86.74
- Final – 83.04 (9th place)

Men's triple jump

- Ketill Hanstveit

- Qualifying – 16.75 (did not advance)

Men's decathlon

- Trond Høiby

- 100m – 11.56
- Long Jump – 6.22
- Shot Put – 14.03
- High Jump – DNS

=== Women's competition ===
Women's 10000 m

- Gunhild Halle-Haugen

- Round 1 – DNF (did not advance)

Women's javelin throw

- Trine Hattestad

- Qualifying – 65.44
- Final – 68.91 (gold medal) – Olympic record

Women's high jump

- Hanne Haugland

- Qualifying – 1.89 (did not advance)

Women's 20 km walk

- Kjersti Plätzer

- Final – 1:29:33 (silver medal)

== Beach volleyball ==
=== Men's beach competition ===
- Vegard Høidalen and Jørre Kjemperud – 9th place (tied)
- Jan Kvalheim and Björn Maaseide – 19th place (tied)

== Canoeing ==
=== Flatwater ===
==== Men's competition ====
Men's kayak singles 500m

- Knut Holmann

- Qualifying heat – 01:40.990
- Semifinal – 01:39.964
- Final – 01:57.847 (gold medal)

Men's kayak singles 1000m

- Knut Holmann

- Qualifying heat – 03:36.565
- Semifinal – 03:36.425
- Final – 03:33.269 (gold medal)

Men's kayak doubles 500m

- Eirik Verås Larsen, Nils Olav Fjeldheim

- Qualifying heat – 01:35.619
- Semifinal – 01:34.712 (did not advance)

Men's kayak doubles 1,000m

- Eirik Verås Larsen, Nils Olav Fjeldheim

- Qualifying heat – 03:15.483
- Semifinal – 03:17.288
- Final – 03:20.515 (9th place)

Men's canoe singles 500m

- Christian Frederiksen

- Qualifying heat – 01:54.366
- Semifinal – 01:53.661 (did not advance)

Men's canoe singles 1000m

- Christian Frederiksen

- Qualifying heat – 03:55.378
- Semifinal – bye
- Final – 03:58.159 (5th place)

== Cycling ==
=== Cross country mountain bike ===
Men's cross country mountain bike

- Tom Larsen

- Final – lapped (35th place)

- Rune Høydahl

- Final – DNF

Women's mountain bike

- Ragnhild Kostøl

- Final – 2:01:51.24 (22nd place)

=== Road cycling ===
==== Men's competition ====
Men's individual time trial

- Thor Hushovd

- Final – 0:59:00 (7th place)

Men's road race

- Bjoemar Vestoel

- Final – 5:36:14 (78th place)

- Kurt Asle Arvesen

- Final – DNF

- Svein Gaute Hølestøl

- Final – DNF

- Thor Hushovd

- Final – DNF

==== Women's competition ====
Women's individual time trial

- Solrun Flataas

- Final – 0:45:01 (20th place)

Women's road race

- Monica Valen

- Final – 3:08:02 (29th place)

- Ingunn Bollerud

- Final – 3:10:33 (35th place)

- Solrun Flataas

- Final – 3:11:04 (38th place)

== Fencing ==
Three fencers, all women, represented Norway in 2000.

Women's épée

- Ragnhild Andenæs
- Margrete Mørch
- Silvia Lesoil

Women's team épée

- Margrete Mørch, Ragnhild Andenæs, Silvia Lesoil

== Football ==
=== Women's tournament ===
Group stage

| Team | Pld | W | D | L | GF | GA | GD | Pts |
|---|---|---|---|---|---|---|---|---|
| United States | 3 | 2 | 1 | 0 | 6 | 2 | +4 | 7 |
| Norway | 3 | 2 | 0 | 1 | 5 | 4 | +1 | 6 |
| China | 3 | 1 | 1 | 1 | 5 | 4 | +1 | 4 |
| Nigeria | 3 | 0 | 0 | 3 | 3 | 9 | −6 | 0 |

14 September 2000
17:30

| United States | 2–0 | Norway |
|---|---|---|
| Milbrett 18'; Hamm 24' | Report |

Melbourne Cricket Ground, Melbourne
Attendance: 16,043
Referee: Im Eun Ju (South Korea)

17 September 2000
17:30

| Norway | 3–1 | Nigeria |
|---|---|---|
| Mellgren 22'; Riise 62' (pen.); Pettersen 90' | Report | Akide 78' |

Bruce Stadium, Canberra
Attendance: 9,150
Referee: Tammy Ogston (Australia)

20 September 2000
17:30

| Norway | 2–1 | China |
|---|---|---|
| Pettersen 55'; Haugenes 78' | Report | Sun 75' (pen.) |

Bruce Stadium, Canberra
Attendance: 11,532
Referee: Sonia Denoncourt (Canada)

Semi-finals

24 September 2000
17:30

| Germany | 0–1 | Norway |
|---|---|---|
| | Report | Wunderlich 80' (o.g.) |

Sydney Football Stadium, Sydney
Attendance: 16,710
Referee: Im Eun Ju (South Korea)

Gold medal match

28 September 2000
20:00

| Norway | 3 – 2 (a.e.t./g.g.) | United States |
|---|---|---|
| Espeseth 44'; Gulbrandsen 78'; Mellgren 102' | Report | Milbrett 5', 90' |

Sydney Football Stadium, Sydney
Attendance: 22,848
Referee: Sonia Denoncourt (Canada)

== Sailing ==
Women's single-handed dinghy (Europe)

- Siren Sundby

- Race 1 – 7
- Race 2 – 10
- Race 3 – 12
- Race 4 – (23)
- Race 5 – 16
- Race 6 – 21
- Race 7 – (28) DNF
- Race 8 – 10
- Race 9 – 23
- Race 10 – 22
- Race 11 – 10
- Final – 131 (19th place)

Women's double-handed dinghy (470)

- Carolina Toll and Jeanette Lunde

- Race 1 – (17)
- Race 2 – 9
- Race 3 – 7
- Race 4 – (17)
- Race 5 – 17
- Race 6 – 11
- Race 7 – 7
- Race 8 – 17
- Race 9 – 8
- Race 10 – 13
- Race 11 – 16
- Final – 105 (16th place)

Open Laser

- Peer Moberg

- Race 1 – 12
- Race 2 – 7
- Race 3 – 11
- Race 4 – (32)
- Race 5 – 7
- Race 6 – 6
- Race 7 – (24)
- Race 8 – 4
- Race 9 – 10
- Race 10 – 22
- Race 11 – 15
- Final – 94 (10th place)

Open three-handed keelboat (Soling)

- Paul Davis, Herman Horn Johannessen and Espen Stokkeland

- Did not advance to Round Robin

Open high-performance two-handed dinghy (49er)

- Christoffer Sundby and Vegard Arnhoff

- Race 1 – 16
- Race 2 – (17)
- Race 3 – (18) OCS
- Race 4 – 2
- Race 5 – 2
- Race 6 – 10
- Race 7 – 14
- Race 8 – 7
- Race 9 – 10
- Race 10 – 16
- Race 11 – 10
- Race 12 – 13
- Race 13 – 6
- Race 14 – 17
- Race 15 – 5
- Race 16 – 14
- Final – 142 (13th place)

== Tennis ==
| Athlete | Event | Round of 64 | Round of 32 | Round of 16 | Quarterfinals | Semifinals | Final / BM | |
| Athlete | Event | Opposition Score | Opposition Score | Opposition Score | Opposition Score | Opposition Score | Opposition Score | Rank |
|---|---|---|---|---|---|---|---|---|
| Christian Ruud | Men's singles | Vinciguerra (SWE); L 2–6, 4–6 | Did not advance | | | | | |

== Notes ==
- Wallechinsky, David (2004). The Complete Book of the Summer Olympics (Athens 2004 Edition). Toronto, Canada. ISBN 1-894963-32-6.
- International Olympic Committee (2001). The Results. Retrieved 12 November 2005.
- Sydney Organising Committee for the Olympic Games (2001). Official Report of the XXVII Olympiad Volume 1: Preparing for the Games Archived 9 November 2000 at the Wayback Machine. Retrieved 20 November 2005.
- Sydney Organising Committee for the Olympic Games (2001). Official Report of the XXVII Olympiad Volume 2: Celebrating the Games Archived 31 July 2012 at the Wayback Machine. Retrieved 20 November 2005.
- Sydney Organising Committee for the Olympic Games (2001). The Results Archived 27 September 2007 at the Wayback Machine. Retrieved 20 November 2005.
- International Olympic Committee Web Site
