= Claus Mørch =

Claus Mørch may refer to:

- Claus Mørch, Sr. (1912–2004), Norwegian Olympic fencer
- Claus Mørch, Jr. (born 1947), Norwegian Olympic fencer and son of the above
- Claus Mørch (born 1976), Norwegian fencer and descendant of Ole Clausen Mørch
