= St. John's Red Storm =

Athletics teams of St. John's University

- University: St. John's University (New York City)
- Nickname: Red Storm
- NCAA: Division I
- Conference: Big East Conference
- Athletic director: Ed Kull
- Location: New York City, New York
- Varsity teams: 17
- Basketball arena: Carnesecca Arena, Madison Square Garden UBS Arena
- Baseball stadium: Jack Kaiser Stadium
- Softball stadium: Red Storm Field
- Soccer field: Belson Stadium
- Colors: Red and white
- Mascot: Johnny Thunderbird
- Fight song: All Hail St. John's Red Storm
- Website: redstormsports.com
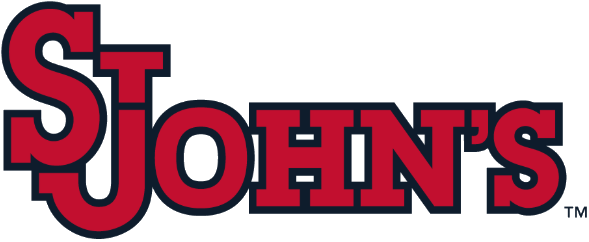

The St. John's Red Storm is the nickname used for the 17 varsity athletic programs of St. John's University, in the U.S. state of New York. St. John's 17 NCAA Division I teams compete in the Big East Conference, with the exception of the fencing team, which compete in the ECAC.

The athletic program fields sixteen intercollegiate teams: basketball, soccer, baseball, lacrosse, tennis, golf, and fencing for men and basketball, soccer, softball, volleyball, tennis, track and field, cross country, golf, and fencing for women. In 2002, the university eliminated five men's athletic teams and one women's team in order to comply with Title IX rules prohibiting activities that receive federal assistance from discriminating on the basis of gender.

== History ==
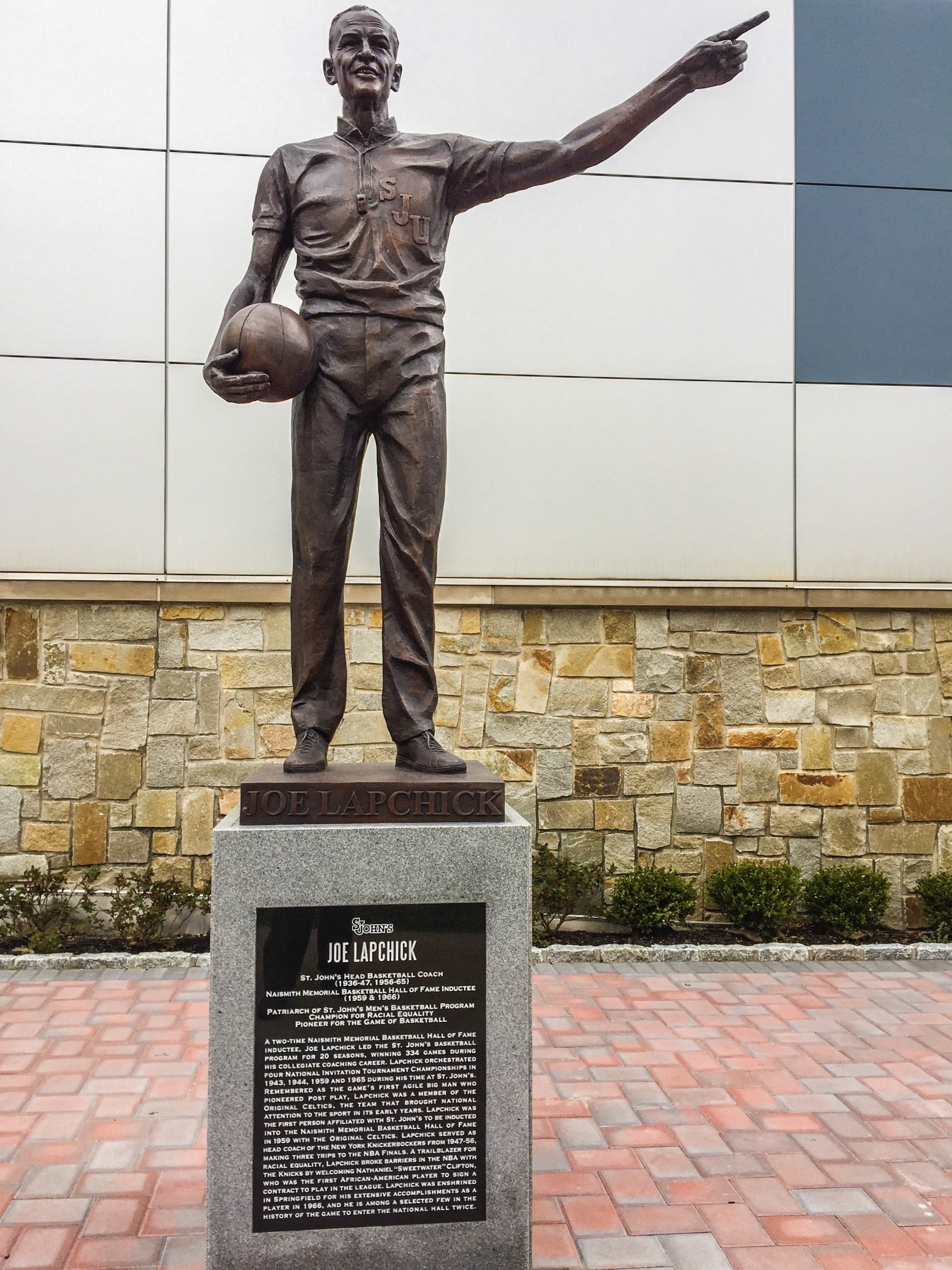
A statute dedicated to former St. John's men's basketball coach Joe Lapchick is located on the Queens campus

Prior to the 1994–95 school year, the university's nickname was the "St. John's Redmen", which referenced the red uniforms worn by its teams in competition. The name was interpreted as a Native American reference beginning as early as the late 1920s, with a group of students bringing a "cigar store Indian" to campus to use as a mascot, who was originally known as Big Chief Red Jacket, and later Chief Blackjack. The team's name was eventually changed to the Red Storm when there was mounting pressure on colleges and universities to adopt names more sensitive to Native American culture.

On September 18, 2009, the new mascot, which was voted on by students, was revealed: Johnny Thunderbird. On December 15, 2012, St. John's and the other six Catholic, non-FBS schools (the so-called "Catholic 7") announced that they were departing the former Big East for a new conference.

The "Catholic 7", after purchasing the "Big East" name from the FBS schools and adding Butler, Creighton, and Xavier, began operating as the new Big East Conference beginning in July 2013.

== Teams ==
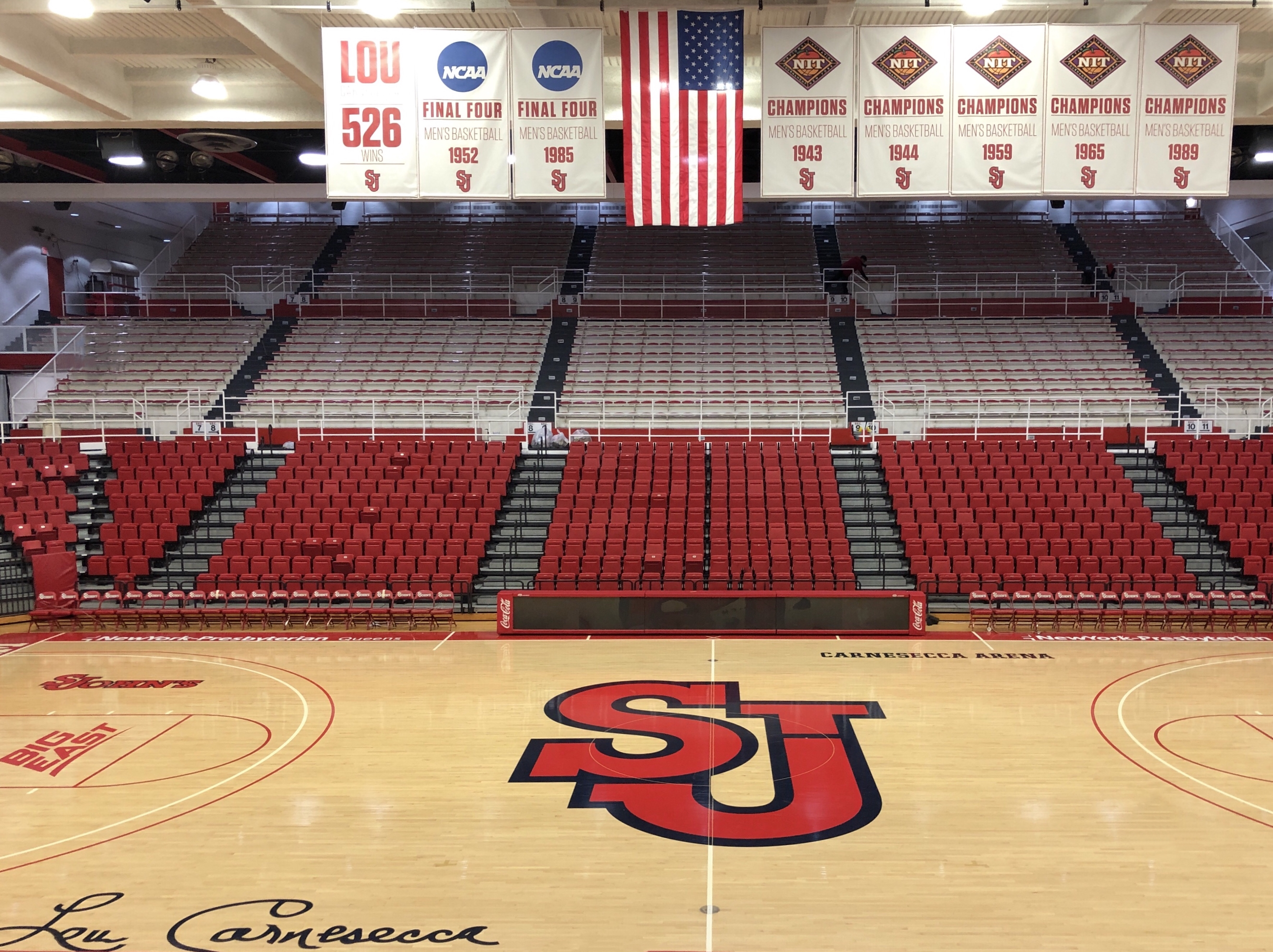
The inside of Carnesecca Arena, the on-campus home for the men's and women's basketball teams, the women's volleyball team and the men's and women's fencing teams

| Men's sports | Women's sports |
|---|---|
| Baseball | Basketball |
| Basketball | Cross country |
| Fencing | Fencing |
| Golf | Golf |
| Lacrosse | Soccer |
| Soccer | Softball |
| Tennis | Tennis |
| | Track & field^{†} |
| | Volleyball |
† – Track and field includes both indoor and outdoor.

=== Baseball ===
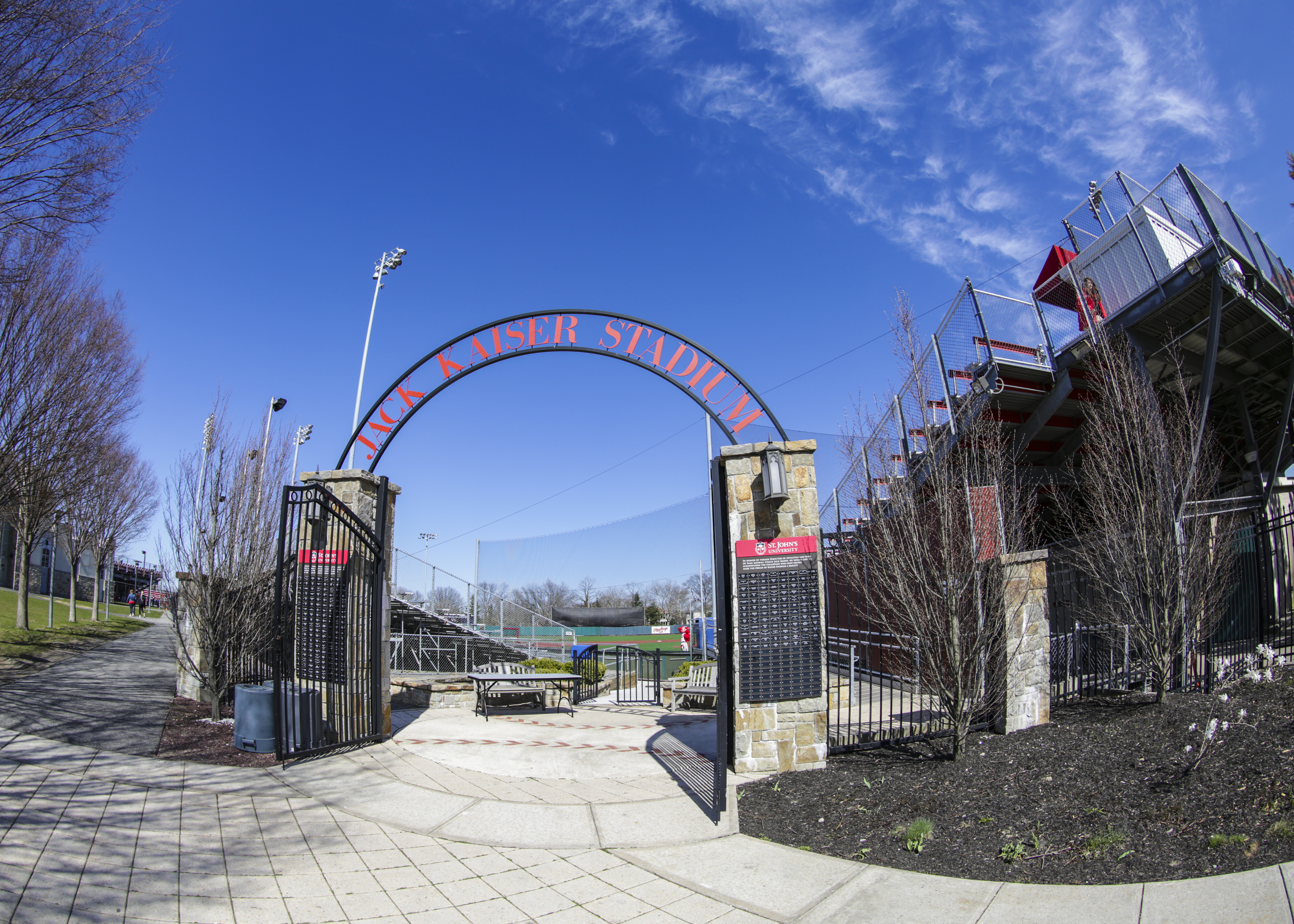
The front entrance of Jack Kaiser Stadium on the Queens Campus, home of the St. John's Red Storm baseball team

- Head coach: Mike Hampton
- Stadium: Jack Kaiser Stadium
- All-Americans: 21 (Frank Viola 1981, Tony Bonura 1986, Eric Reichenbach 1991, C.J. Nitkowski 1994, Mike Dzurilla 1998, Mike Dzurilla 1999, Mike Rozema 2003, Craig Hansen 2005, Anthony Varvaro 2005, Will Vogl 2006, George Brown 2008, Tim Morris 2009, Jeremy Baltz 2010, Joe Panik 2011, Jeremy Baltz 2012, Matt Wessinger 2012, Ryan McCormick 2015, Thomas Hackimer 2015, Thomas Hackimer 2016, Sean Mooney 2017, Sean Mooney 2018)
- Big East Championships: 18 (Tournament: 1985, 1986, 1988, 1993, 1997, 2010, 2012, 2015, 2018; Regular Season: 1987, 1991, 1992, 2005, 2007, 2008, 2012, 2015, 2018)
- College World Series appearances: 6 (1949, 1960, 1966, 1968, 1978, 1980)

The St. John's baseball team, currently coached by Mike Hampton, has been to the College World Series six times, recorded 34 NCAA appearances, 8 Big East Championships and have sent 70 players on to professional baseball careers. The team plays at the 3,500-seat Jack Kaiser Stadium, dedicated in 2007 to the Hall of Fame Coach and former St. John's Athletic Director. The stadium is one of the largest college baseball stadiums in the northeast, and is a featured venue on the EA Sports MVP NCAA baseball video game. The Red Storm played the first-ever game at the Mets' new ballpark, Citi Field on March 29, 2009.

St. John's major leaguers have included Rich Aurilia, Danny Burawa, John Franco, Sam Nahem, Joe Panik, Steve Ratzer, Wayne Rosenthal, Mickey Rutner, CJ Nitkowski, and Frank Viola.

=== Basketball ===
==== Men's Basketball ====
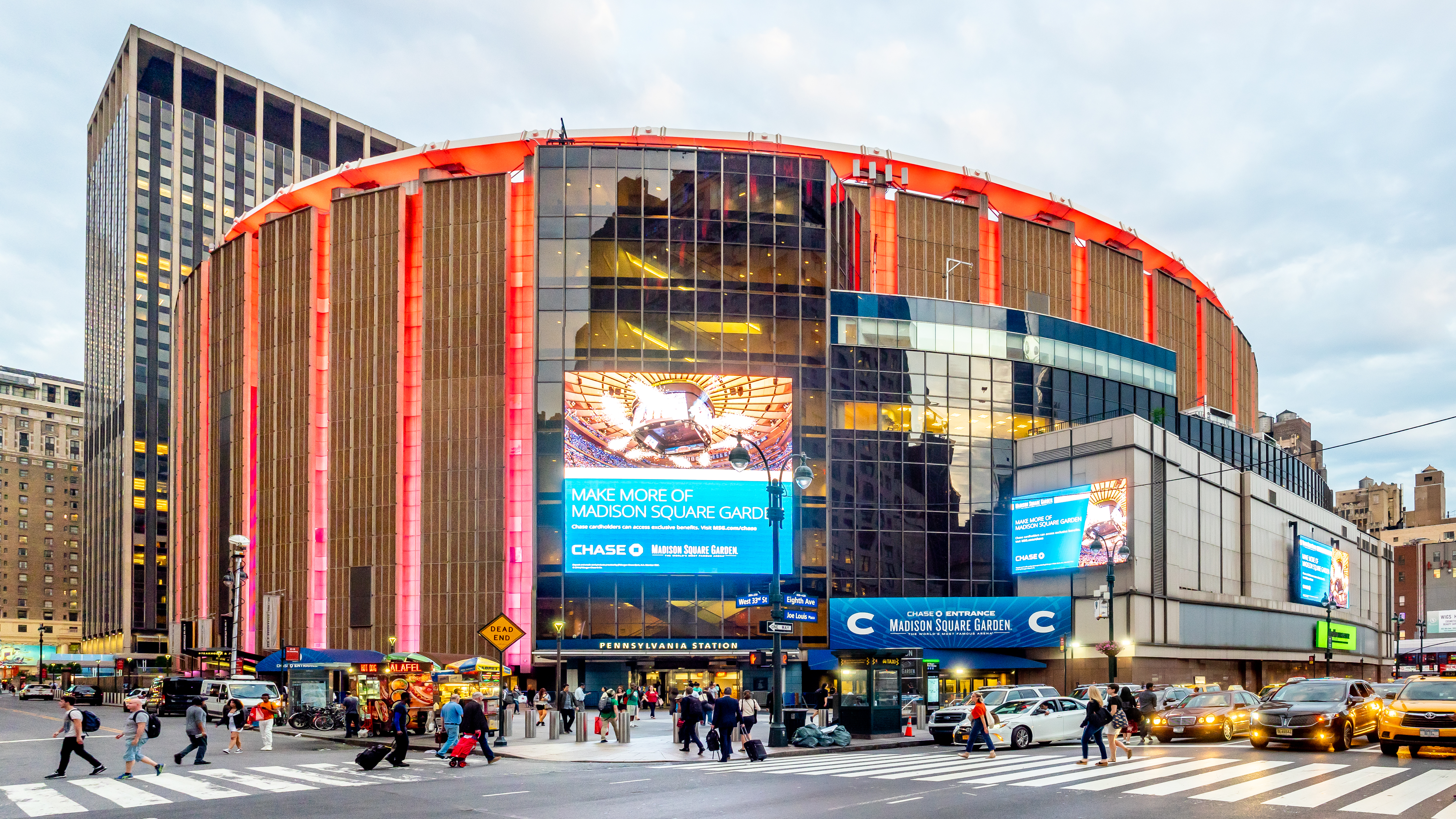
Madison Square Garden (MSG) – Home Court for St. John's Basketball

The men's basketball team has reached the NCAA tournament twenty-eight (28) times, boasts two John R. Wooden Award winners, 11 consensus All-Americans, 6 members of the College Basketball Hall of Fame, and has sent 59 players to the NBA. The school is also the 8th winningest team in all of college basketball.

St. John's was the eighth-most-winningest program in college basketball history through the 2025-26 season (2,003 wins), St. John's boasts the seventh-most NCAA tournament appearances (27), two Wooden Award winners as national player of the year, 11 consensus All-Americans, 6 members of the College Basketball Hall of Fame, and has sent 59 players to the NBA. However, St. John's currently holds the NCAA Division I record for most NCAA Men's Division I Basketball Championship appearances without a championship. The Red Storm play most of their home games at Madison Square Garden, "The World's Most Famous Arena", while their early non-conference games are held at Carnesecca Arena on the St. John's campus in Queens.

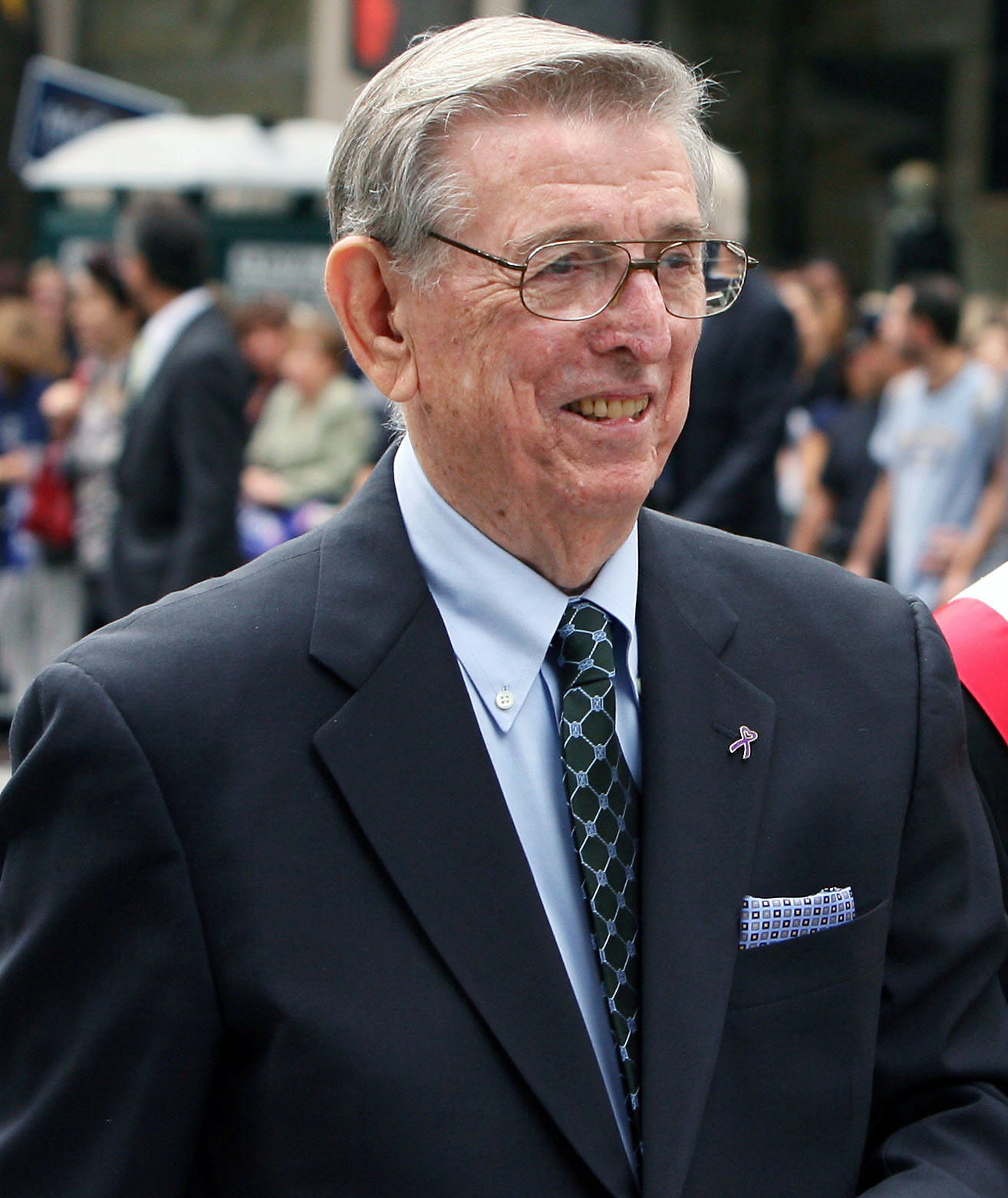
Lou Carnesecca

Among the most successful coachs of the team in addition to current head coach Rick Pitino have been Joe Lapchick (334–130, in 1936–47 and 1956–65), Frank McGuire (102–36, in 1947-52), Lou Carnesecca (526–200, in1965–70 and 1973–92), Fran Fraschilla (35–24, in 1996–98), and Steve Lavin (81–53, in 2010–2015 ).

The basketball team is the most popular collegiate basketball program in New York City and has a world-wide following. There are numerous fan forums that support the basketball program, in addition to all of the university's teams. The most popular is redmen.com which often leads the mainstream sports media in breaking news regarding its sports teams.

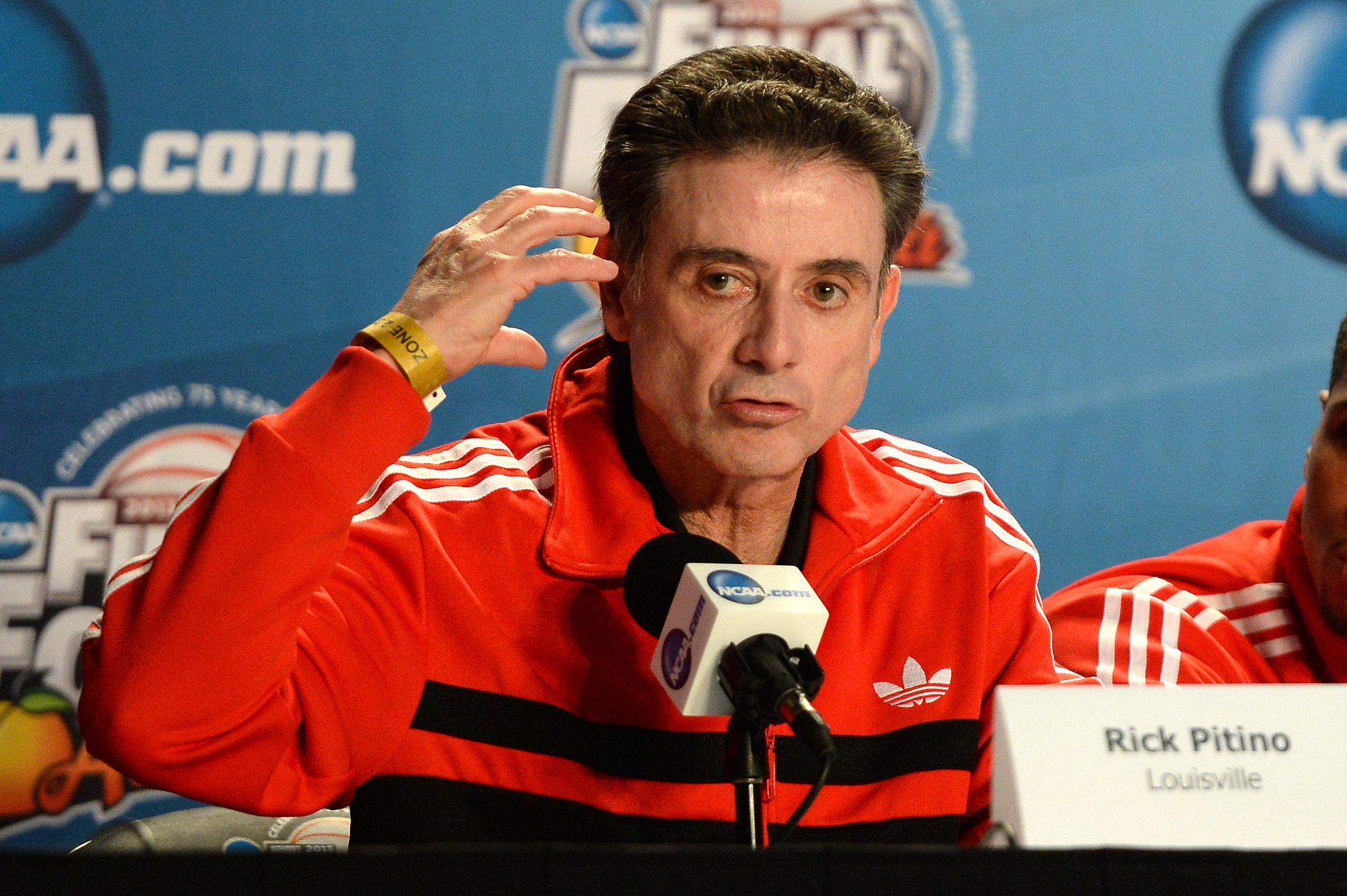
Rick Pitino

- Head coach: Rick Pitino
- Arena: Carnesecca Arena and Madison Square Garden
- Big East Championships: 7 (Tournament: 1983, 1986, 2000, 2025; Regular Season: 1980, 1983, 1985, 1986, 1992, 2025)
- NCAA Appearances: 29 (1951, 1952, 1961, 1967, 1968, 1969, 1973, 1976, 1977, 1978, 1979, 1980, 1982, 1983, 1984, 1985, 1986, 1987, 1988, 1990, 1991, 1992, 1993, 1998, 1999, 2000, 2011, 2015, 2019, 2025, 2026)
- Final Four Appearances: 2 (1952, 1985)
- National Players of the Year: 2 (Chris Mullin 1984–85, Walter Berry 1985–86)

==== Women's Basketball ====
Along with the St. John's fencing program, the women's basketball program at St. John's has been one of the most successful women's programs at the university. The Red Storm women's program are 4 time Big East Champions (1983, 1984, 1988 & 2016) and have appeared in 10 NCAA women's basketball tournaments, including 7 appearances since 2006. On February 18, 2012, the St. John's women's team defeated perennial national power the UConn Huskies 57–56, in Connecticut, to end the Huskies' 99-game home court winning streak.

- Head coach: Joe Tartamella
- Arena: Carnesecca Arena
- Big East Championships: 6 (Tournament: 1983, 1984, 1988, 2016; Regular Season: 1983, 1985)
- NCAA Appearances: 10 (1983, 1984, 1988, 2006, 2010, 2011, 2012, 2013, 2014, 2016)

The women's basketball team is currently coached by Joe Tartamella, who became the program's seventh head coach in 2012. Since then the team has competed in six post-season tournaments in his seven-year tenure and won one Big East tournament title. The program's highest post-season finish came during the 2011–12 season when they advanced to Sweet Sixteen under Kim Barnes Arico led by WNBA draft picks, Nadirah McKenith and Shenneika Smith.

Since then the program has had two additional WNBA selections, in Aliyyah Handford and Danaejah Grant, who helped add a fourth Big East tournament championship in 2016.

=== Fencing ===
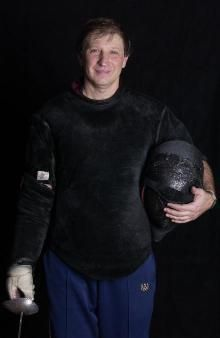
Yury Gelman

- Head coach: Yury Gelman
- National Championships: 1 (2001)
- Individual National Championships: 22

The St. John's fencing program has also attained national prominence under US Fencing Hall of Fame and seven-time Olympic saber coach Yury Gelman. In 2001, St. John's won the NCAA Fencing Championship. The team has ranked in the top seven each of the last 30 years from 1995 on under Gelman, and finished second in the NCAA during 1995, 2000, 2002, 2007 and 2010 seasons. In addition to team accolades, St. John's has won 26 NCAA individual national championship titles, and 140 of its fencers have been named All-Americans. Israeli Olympian Tomer Or is a coach of the team.

Notable former fencers:

- Daryl Homer (born 1990), 2× USA Olympic fencer (London '12, Rio '16)
- Ivan Lee (born 1981), USA Olympic fencer (Athens '04); banned for life by SafeSport
- Eli Schenkel (born 1992), Canadian Olympic fencer
- Keeth Smart (born 1978), 3× USA Olympic fencer (Sydney '00, Athens '04, Beijing '08)
- Jonathan Tiomkin (born 1979), USA Olympic fencer (Athens '04)
- Arlene Stevens (born 1981), USA Olympic fencer (Sydney '00)
- Dagmara Wozniak (born 1988), 3× USA Olympic fencer (Beijing '08, London '12, Rio '16)
- Curtis McDowald (born 1996), USA Olympic fencer

=== Golf ===
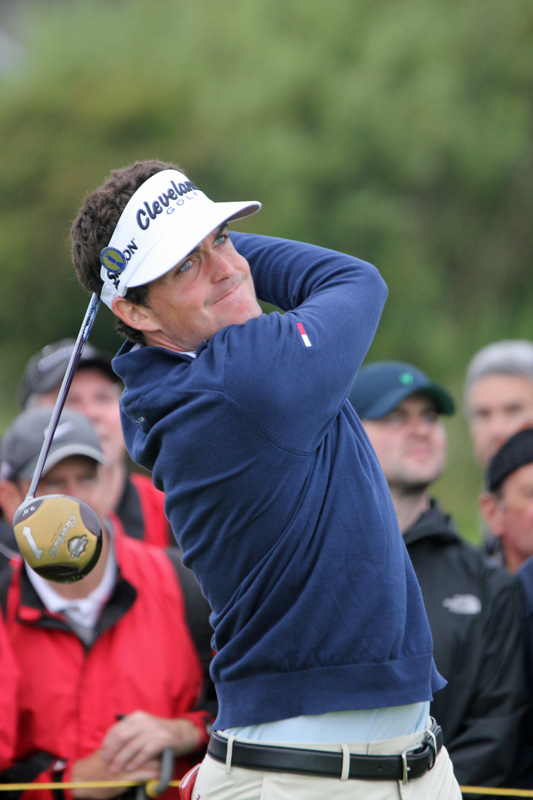
Keegan Bradley

The men's golf team have won 10 Big East conference titles: 1979, 1981–84, 1986–89, 2014. The men's team also had three players finish in first place at the annual Big East Championship: Andrew Svoboda in 2001, Ryan McCormick in 2014, and Dylan Crowley in 2015.

The women's golf team won the first and only Big East team championship in 2005 and two individual championships in 2011 and 2014.

Notable former golfers:

- Andrew Svoboda (Class of 2003), PGA Tour golfer
- Ryan McCormick (Class of 2014), PGA Tour golfer
- Keegan Bradley (Class of 2008), PGA Tour golfer
- Mike Ballo Jr. (Class of 2010), Web.com Tour golfer

=== Soccer ===
==== Men's soccer ====
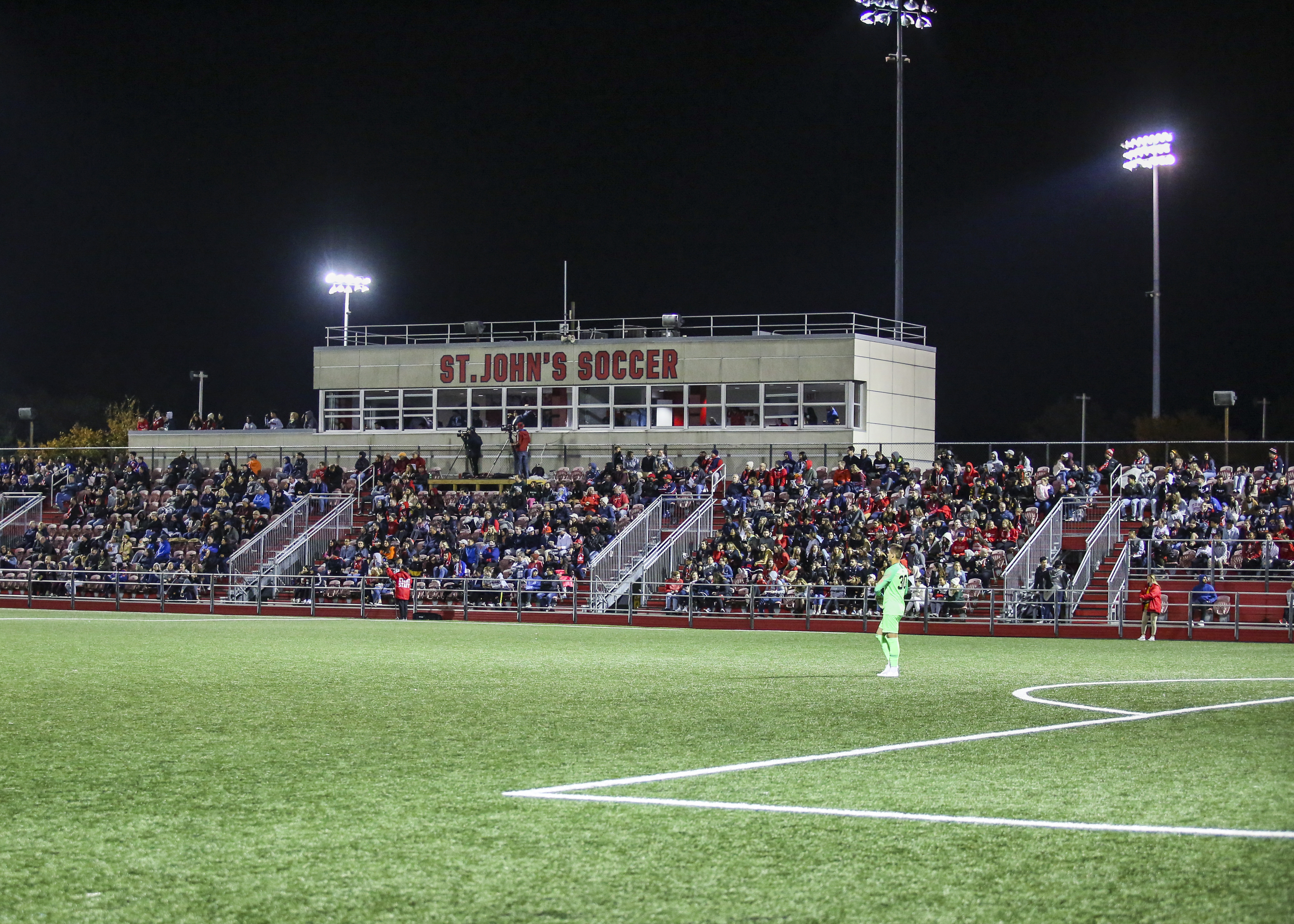
A view inside Belson Stadium, the home of the St. John's men's and women's soccer teams on the Queens Campus

The St. John's men's soccer program has appeared in 15 consecutive NCAA tournaments, advancing to the Sweet 16 in each of the last ten seasons, and the Final Four on 3 occasions. They have captured 11 Big East Championships, including the 2006 season title as well as the 2009 season title, and in 1996, St. John's won the NCAA National Championship. Their home games are hosted at Belson Stadium, a state-of-the-art 2,300-seat stadium on the university campus. In 2006, the men's soccer team became the first American soccer team to be invited to play in Vietnam. The team played against several Vietnam Football Federation squads as well as participating in community service.

- Head coach: David Masur
- Stadium: Belson Stadium
- Big East Championships: 15 (Tournament: 1992, 1993, 1994, 1995, 1998, 2001, 2006, 2009, 2011; Regular Season: 1992, 1993, 1996, 1997, 2003, 2008)
- College Cup Appearances: 4 (1996, 2001, 2003, 2008)
- National Championships: 1 (1996)

==== Women's soccer ====
The St. John's program have been members of the Big East since the conference started sponsoring women's soccer in 1994, and winning the conference's inaugural tournament. The Red Storm have competed in four NCAA Division I Women's Soccer Championships with a record of 2–2–1 with their two wins coming in 2013 against Central Florida before falling to Arkansas in the second round, and their second 1–0 over Brown in extra time in the first round in 2021. They were led by two-time NSCAA All-American Rachel Daly who went on to break many university scoring records and being selected in the 2016 NWSL College Draft by the Houston Dash with the sixth overall pick.

- Head coach: Ian Stone
- Stadium: Belson Stadium
- Big East Championships: 2 (Tournament: 1994; Regular Season: 2015)
- NCAA Appearances: 4 (2009, 2013, 2015, 2021)

=== Softball ===
The 2015 campaign for the St. John's softball team was a historic one for the program. The Red Storm softball team won their first ever Big East Championship in 2015 and appeared in the 2015 NCAA softball tournament for the first time in program history.

- Head coach: Michelle DePolo
- Stadium: Red Storm Field
- Big East Championships: 5 (Regular Season: 2015, 2017, 2019, 2025; Tournament: 2015)
- NCAA Appearances: 1 (2015)

=== Tennis ===
The men's tennis team has won 7 Big East conference titles: 1980, 1991, 2014–2016, 2019, 2025.

The women's tennis team won their first and only Big East conference championship in 2018.

=== Volleyball ===
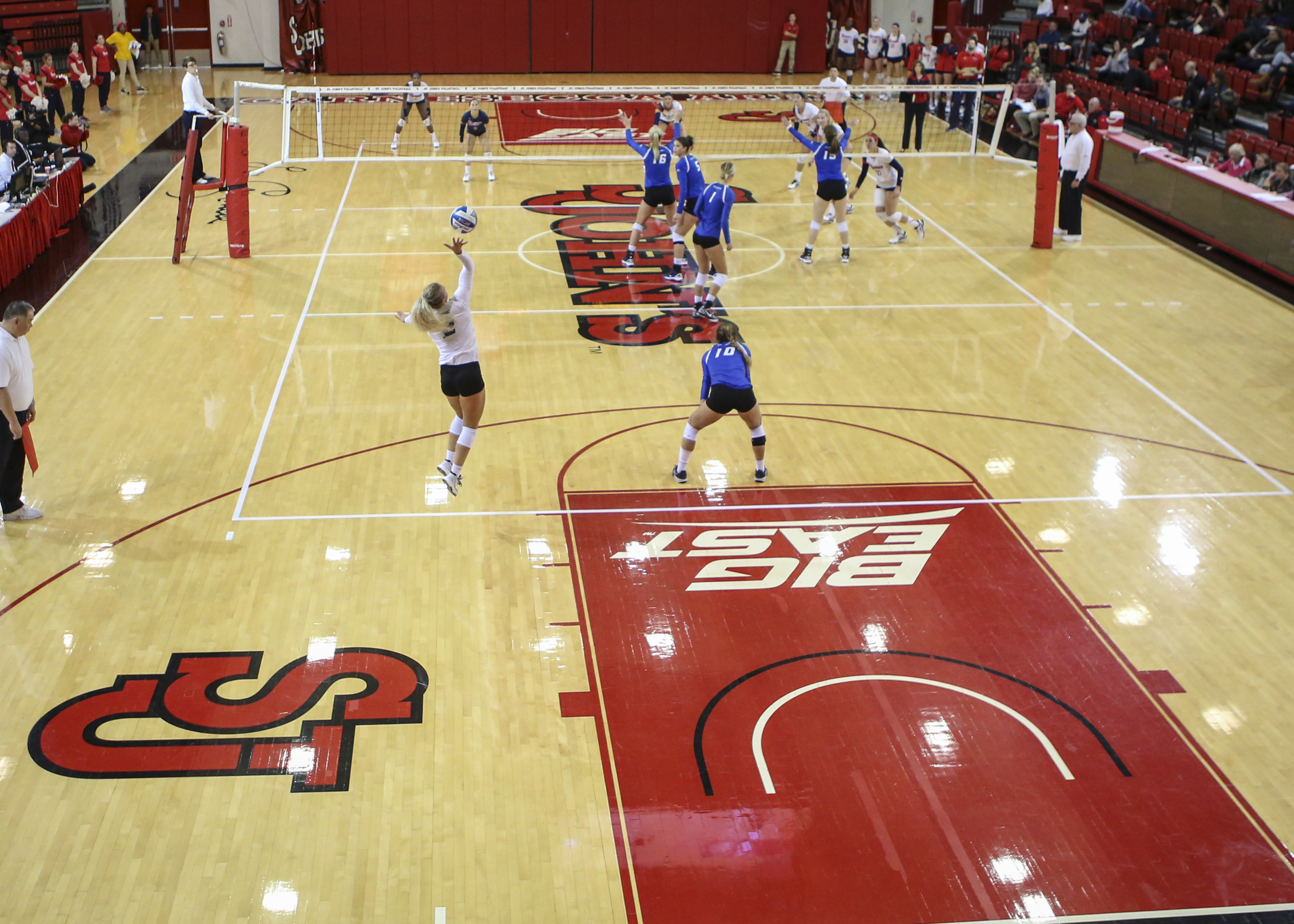
The St. John's Red Storm volleyball team hosting a match at Carnesecca Arena

The women's volleyball team at St. John's have won 3 Big East regular-season championships (2006, 2007 & 2008) and won the Big East Championship in 2007 and 2019 – and appeared in the Women's Volleyball NCAA tournament in 2006, 2007 and 2019.

- Head coach: Joanne Persico
- Arena: Carnesecca Arena
- Big East Championships: 5 (Tournament: 2007, 2019; Regular Season: 2006, 2007, 2008)
- NCAA Appearances: 3 (2006, 2007, 2019)

=== Football ===
St. John's discontinued its varsity football team in 2002.

== Championships ==
=== NCAA team championships ===
St. John's has won two NCAA team national championships.

- Men's (1)
  - Soccer (1): 1996
- Co-ed (1)
  - Fencing (1): 2001
- see also:
  - Big East Conference NCAA team championships
  - List of NCAA schools with the most NCAA Division I championships

== Mascot ==
In spring 2009, St. John's allowed its students to vote on what the new official Red Storm mascot would be. At a soccer game in fall 2009, members of the Athletics Department announced that a Thunderbird had received the majority of votes and would become the new mascot. After a vote, the new mascot was named Johnny Thunderbird. He can be seen at many of the school's athletic events, cheering on the Red Storm.

== St. John's Athletics Hall of Fame ==
In 1984, St. John's established an athletics hall of fame with 10 charter members representing a cross-section of the school's athletic history.

| Class | Number of Inductees | List of Inductees |
|---|---|---|
| 1984–85 | 10 | Larry Bearnarth, baseball; LeRoy Ellis, men's basketball; Tom Farrell, track and field; James Freeman, men's basketball coach; Lynn Burke, swimming; Joe Lapchick, men's basketball coach; Frank McGuire, men's basketball coach; Dick McGuire, men's basketball; Walter T. McLaughlin, athletic director; George Seewagen, tennis coach |
| 1985–86 | 10 | Harry Boykoff, men's basketball; John Duenzl, track and field; Matt Galante, baseball; Tony Jackson, men's basketball; Max Kinsbrunner, men's basketball; Kevin Loughery, men's basketball; Jack McMahon, men's basketball; Nancy Midwinter, swimming; Philip Reilly, fencing; Bill Ward, track and field coach/intramural director |
| 1986–87 | 10 | Frank Briggs, rifle; Lou Carnesecca, men's basketball coach; Jack Garfinkel, men's basketball; Hy Gotkin, men's basketball; Ling Ling Hou, women's basketball; Jack Kaiser, baseball coach and athletic director; Andrew Levane, men's basketball; Mickey Rutner, baseball; Alan Seiden, men's basketball; John Warren, men's basketball |
| 1987–88 | 5 | Sue Bretthauer, women's basketball; Reggie Carter, men's basketball; Pete Close, track and field; Sonny Dove, men's basketball; Bob Sheppard, announcer |
| 1988–89 | 6 | Tito Balestrieri, rifle; Mel Davis, men's basketball; Andre Deladrier, fencing coach; Sal Ferrara, baseball; Dr. Carl Fields, track and field; John "Doc" Gimmler, head athletic trainer/golf coach |
| 1989–90 | 6 | Kim Thomas Barnes (Carter), track and field; Rev. Henry Honsberger, moderator of athletics; Bob Kaczmarek, baseball; Billy Schaeffer, men's basketball; Joseph Schneider, track and field; Peter Toennies, swimming |
| 1990–91 | 6 | Gerry Bush, men's basketball; Oneitha "Nene" Davis, track and field; Timothy Hanlon, track and field; William McKeever, men's basketball; Kathleen Murphy-Meehan, women's basketball; Mike Proly, baseball |
| 1991–92 | 6 | Frank Alagia, men's basketball; Steve Bartold, track and field coach; Debbie Beckford, women's basketball; Ed Bertram, tennis; John Gallagher, men's basketball; Marty Satalino, baseball/men's basketball |
| 1992–93 | 6 | Mike Diffley, golf; George Johnson, men's basketball; Joseph Lang, track and field; Milt Rosenbaum, baseball; Maryanne Persan-Torellas, track and field; James White, men's basketball |
| 1993–94 | 6 | Herb Hess, equipment manager; Bob McIntyre, men's basketball; Rev. Robert Rivard, moderator of athletics; Constance Darnowski-Stoll, track and field; Solly Walker, men's basketball; Ed Waters, baseball |
| 1994–95 | 6 | Gerald Calabrese, men's basketball; Jack Curran, baseball/men's basketball; Al "Dusty" DeStefano, men's basketball; Rev. W. Graham, administrator; Bartholomew Nnaji, track and field; Randi Samet, fencing |
| 1995–96 | 5 | Bill Cimmillo, football; Bill Esposito, sports information director; Richard Krempecki, swimming; Barbara Perry, tennis; David Russell, men's basketball |
| 1996–97 | 6 | John DaSilva, hockey; Dr. Irving Glick, team physician; Billy Paultz, men's basketball; Bob Ricca, football coach; Frank Viola, baseball; Virginia Young-Coleman, track and field |
| 1997–98 | 6 | Dennis Bligen, football; Jack Carew, cross country; John Franco, baseball; Frank Gilroy, men's basketball; Rev. Edward Kiernan, moderator of athletics; Dorothy Pace-Giordano, women's basketball |
| 1998–99 | | no induction ceremony held |
| 1999–2000 | 6 | Sonja Fitts, track and field; Sabrina Johnson, women's basketball; Roger "Dutch" Ouderkirk, assistant football coach/equipment manager; Ron Rutledge, assistant men's basketball coach; Tom Sowinski, baseball; Glenn Williams, men's basketball |
| 2000–01 | 8 | Joe Brodeth, fencing coach; Gil Hodges, honorary inductee; Erin McDonnell, softball; Ken McIntyre, men's basketball; Rich Napolitano, baseball; Anthony Russo Jr., football; Jackie Smith, women's basketball; Bill Wennington, men's basketball |
| 2001-02 | | no induction ceremony held |
| 2002-03 | | no induction ceremony held |
| 2003-04 | 5 | Cozette Ballentine, women's basketball; The Belson Family (Jerome, Maxine, and Tad Belson), contributors; Dr. David Masur, men's soccer coach; Michael Ricigliano, baseball; 1996 Men's Soccer Team, men's soccer |
| 2004-05 | | no induction ceremony held |
| 2005-06 | | no induction ceremony held |
| 2006-07 | | no induction ceremony held |
| 2007-08 | | no induction ceremony held |
| 2008-09 | | no induction ceremony held |
| 2009–10 | | no induction ceremony held |
| 2010–11 | | no induction ceremony held |
| 2011–12 | | no induction ceremony held |
| 2012–13 | 10 | Walter Berry, men's basketball; Cristin Burtis, women's soccer; Huey Ferguson, men's soccer; Courtney Fitzgerald-Cardot, softball; Youree Spence-Garcia, track and field; Dolores Dixon-Grevious, women's basketball; Keeth Smart, fencing; Arlene Stevens, fencing; Donald and Eleanor Taffner, contributors; Anthony Zito, football |
| 2013–14 | 7 | Rich Aurilia, baseball; Fred Bischoff, men's soccer; Mike Bolger, lacrosse; Adriana Burke-Viola, women's soccer; Wioleta Leszczynska, women's volleyball; Janet Roos, women's basketball; Malik Sealy, men's basketball |
| 2014–15 | 7 | The Brennan Family, contributors; Tina Loven, fencing; Chris Mullin, men's basketball; C. J. Nitkowski, baseball; Erik Scharf, men's tennis; Andrew Svoboda, men's golf; Kia Wright, women's basketball |
| 2015–16 | | no induction ceremony held |
| 2016–17 | | no induction ceremony held |
| 2017–18 | | no induction ceremony held |
| 2018–19 | | no induction ceremony held |
| 2019–20 | 8 | Jackie Ahlers, women's volleyball; Keegan Bradley, men's golf; Yury Gelman, fencing coach; Roman Linscheid, men's track and field; Felipe Lopez, men's basketball; Joe Russo, baseball coach; Da'Shena Stevens, women's basketball; Chris Wingert, men's soccer |
| 2020–21 | | no induction ceremony held |
| 2021–22 | 9 | Ralph Addonizio, baseball; Kevin Daly, men's soccer; Joe Depre, men's basketball; Jim Hurt, track and field coach; Mark Jackson, men's basketball; Todd Jamison, football; Harin Lee, women's golf; Shenneika Smith, women's basketball; Dagmara Wozniak, fencing |
| 2022–23 | 6 | Priscilla Frederick, track and field; Ed Blankmeyer, baseball coach; Jayson Williams, men's basketball; Kieran McArdle, men's lacrosse; Jerry Houston, men's basketball; Nadirah McKenith, women's basketball |
| 2023–24 | 8 | Craig Hansen, baseball; Gus Alfieri, men's basketball; Greg "Boo" Harvey, men's basketball; Bernard Rencher, men's basketball; Aliyyah Handford, women's basketball; Erin Burner, softball; Ben Hickey, men's soccer; Diana Poulin, women's soccer |
| 2024-25 | 6 | Michael Dzurilla, baseball; Marcus Hatten, men's basketball; Danaejah Grant, women's basketball; Pat Fogarty, men's golf; Shalrie Joseph, men's soccer; Marsha Henry-Seagrave, women's track & field |

== Notable sportspersons ==
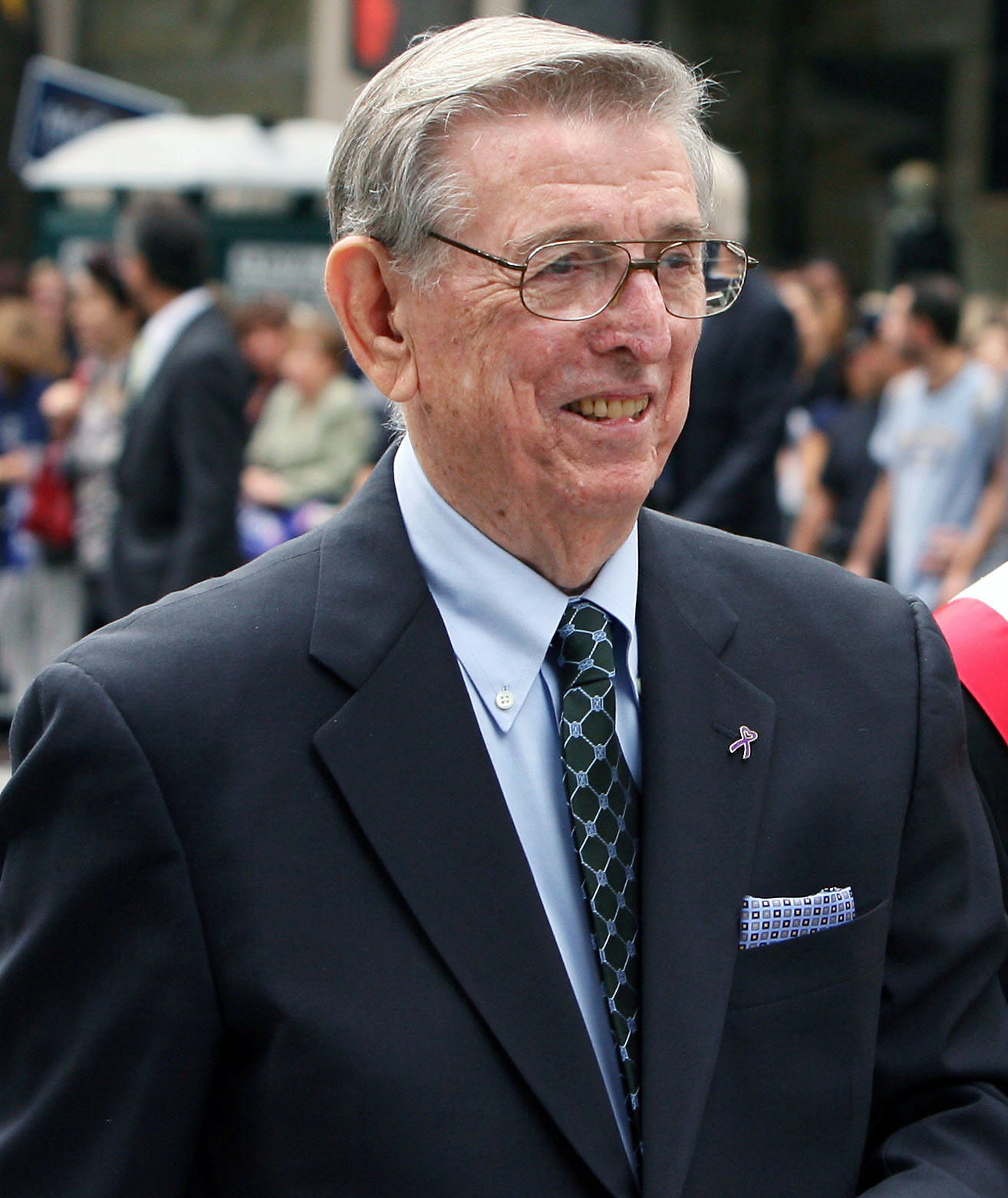
Lou Carnesecca

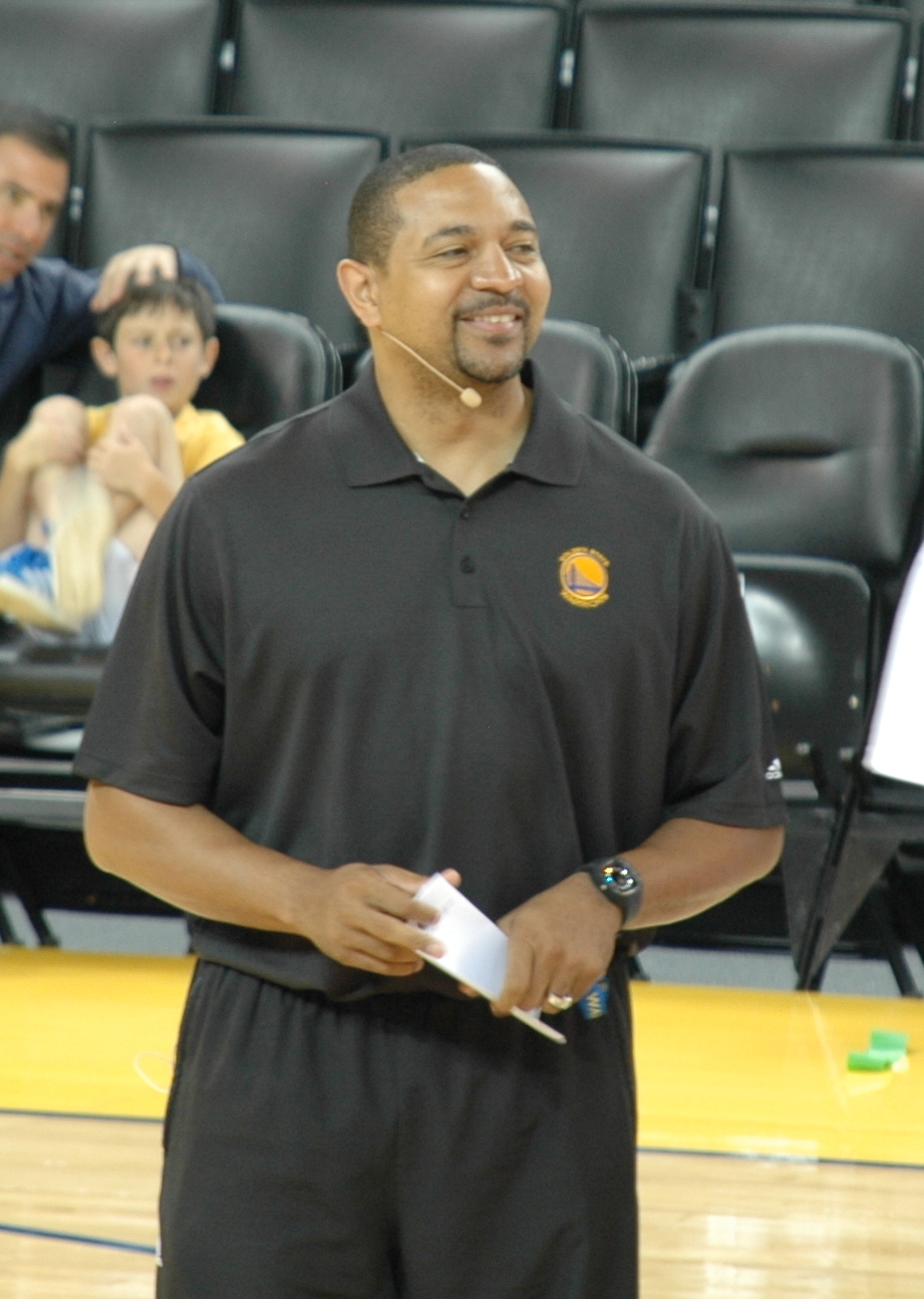
Mark Jackson

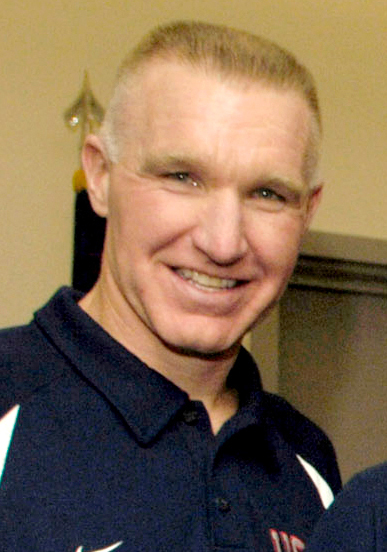
Chris Mullin

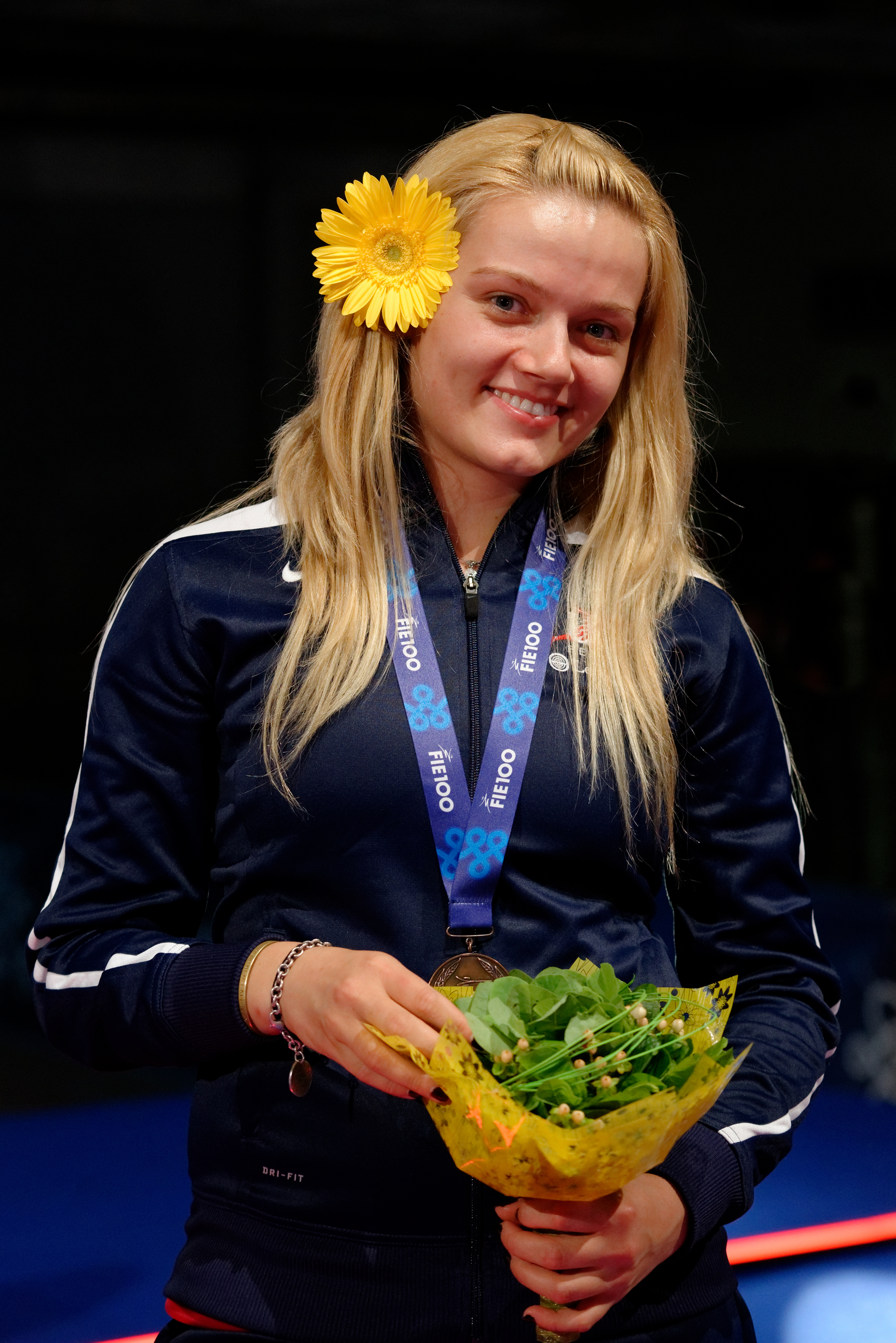
Dagmara Wozniak

- Ron Artest (now Metta Sandiford-Artest) (born 1979), NBA basketball player
- Rich Aurilia (born 1971), MLB professional baseball player
- Erick Barkley, NBA basketball player
- Walter Berry, NBA basketball player
- Keegan Bradley, PGA Tour golfer and 2011 PGA Major Championship winner
- Danny Burawa (born 1988), major league baseball pitcher.
- Lou Carnesecca, Hall of Fame basketball coach
- Omar Cook, NBA basketball player
- Rachel Daly, professional soccer player in the WSL and the England women's national football team
- Mel Davis, European professional basketball player, current director of basketball alumni development for St. John's University
- Mike Francesa, popular sports radio talk show host for WFAN in the New York City metro area.
- John Franco, former baseball player who was captain for the New York Mets
- Bill Gaudette, MLS professional soccer player
- Matt Groenwald, MLS professional soccer player
- Zendon Hamilton, U.S. professional basketball player in Europe, former NBA player
- Craig Hansen, MLB professional baseball player
- Maurice Harkless (born 1993), NBA basketball player
- Darryl Hill, basketball player known as "Showtime Hill"
- Daryl Homer (born 1990), 2× USA Olympic fencer (London '12, Rio '16)
- Mark Jackson, NBA basketball player and head coach
- Shalrie Joseph, MLS professional soccer player
- D. J. Kennedy, NBA basketball player
- Brian Kenny, MLB Network sportscaster
- John Kresse, NCAA men's basketball coach at the College of Charleston
- Al McGuire, NCAA men's basketball coach and sports commentator
- Dick McGuire, NBA Player with Pistons and Knicks and NBA Coach with Pistons and Knicks
- Frank McGuire, NCAA Men's basketball coach at St. John's, North and South Carolina and NBA coach for the Philadelphia Warriors
- Thomas Michaelsen, professional lacrosse player
- Stefani Miglioranzi, MLS professional soccer player for Philadelphia Union, played in England for Swindon Town
- Chris Mullin, 1984 John R. Wooden Award recipient, 1984 Olympic gold medal winner, 1992 Olympic gold medal winner, NBA player (1985–2001), 5-time NBA All Star (1989–1993), 2010 Naismith Basketball Hall of Fame inductee (as part of the Dream Team), 2011 Naismith Basketball Hall of Fame inductee (individually)
- Joe Panik, professional baseball player, 2011 first-round draft pick of the San Francisco Giants
- Brent Sancho, MLS professional soccer player
- Eli Schenkel (born 1992), Canadian Olympic fencer
- Malik Sealy, NBA basketball player (now deceased)
- Bob Sheppard, stadium PA announcer for the New York Yankees and New York Giants, famously dubbed "Voice of the Yankees" (now deceased)
- Keeth Smart (born 1978), Olympic fencer, first U.S. fencer to reach #1 world ranking
- Arlene Stevens (born 1981), Olympic fencer
- Jonathan Tiomkin (born 1979), USA Olympic fencer (Athens '04)
- Frank Viola, professional baseball player
- Bill Wennington, Canadian NBA basketball player and author
- Jayson Williams, NBA basketball player and author
- Chris Wingert, MLS professional soccer player
- Dagmara Wozniak (born 1988), 3× USA Olympic fencer (Beijing '08, London '12, Rio '16)
