= Claus Mørch (fencer, born 1976) =

Norwegian fencer

Personal information
- Full name: Claus Severin Mørch
- Born: 3 April 1976 (age 50) Oslo, Norway

Sport
- Sport: Fencing
- Event: Epée
- Club: Bygdøy

Achievements and titles
- World finals: Bronze (2005)

Claus Severin Mørch (born 3 April 1976) is a Norwegian fencer.

He was a brother of fencer Margrete Mørch, and a grandson of Claus Mørch Sr., son of Claus Mørch Jr. and nephew of Ole Mørch, who all fenced for Norway at the Olympics. He grew up at Bygdøy in Oslo.

He and his sister were coached by Mariusz Piasecki. While Claus Mørch never competed in the Olympics, he won the bronze medal at the 2005 World Fencing Championships. He had formerly been a promising fencer in the age categories, winning bronze medal at the 1991 World Youth Championships, gold medal at the 1993 World Youth Championships, bronze medal at the 1994 European Youth Championships, gold medal at the 1995 European Junior Championships and bronze medal at the 1995 World Junior Championships. He won the Norwegian Championships every year from 1995 through 2007, except 1996.
