= Mørch =

Mørch is a Norwegian or Danish surname. The name may refer to:

- Claus Mørch (disambiguation)
- Olaf Mørch Hansson (1856-1912), Norwegian actor
- Ole Mørk (born 1948), sometimes known as Ole Mørch, Danish football manager
- Ole Clausen Mørch (1774-1829), Norwegian politician
- Otto Andreas Lowson Mörch (1828-1878), also spelled Mørch, malacologist
- Petter Mørch Koren (1910-2004), Norwegian politician
