= St. John's Red Storm fencing =

American college fencing team

- First season: 1934
- Head coach: Yury Gelman; 30th season, –
- Home stadium: Taffner Field House
- Location: Jamaica, Queens
- League: Independent
- National Titles: 1 (2001)
- Mascot: Johnny the Thunderbird

St. John's Red Storm fencing represents the St. John's University in collegiate fencing. The Red Storm compete as an independent school of NCAA Division I.

== Olympians ==
The following St. John's players and coaches have represented their country in fencing in the Summer Olympic Games:

Year	Player/Coach	Country	Location	Event
2000	Yury Gelman	United States	Sydney	Saber coach
2004	Yury Gelman	United States	Athens	Saber coach
2008	Yury Gelman	United States	Beijing	Saber coach
2012	Yury Gelman	United States	London	Saber coach
2016	Yury Gelman	United States	Rio	Saber coach
2024	Yury Gelman	United States	Paris	Saber coach
2012	Daryl Homer	United States	London	6th Place Men's Individual Saber
2016	Daryl Homer	United States	Rio	Men's Individual Saber
2020	Daryl Homer	United States	Tokyo	23rd Place Men's Individual Saber
2004	Ivan Lee	United States	Athens	12th Place Men's Individual Saber
2000	Keeth Smart	United States	Sydney	30th Place Men's Individual Saber
2004	Keeth Smart	United States	Athens	15th Place Men's Individual Saber
2008	Keeth Smart	United States	Beijing	6th Place Men's Individual Saber; Men's Team Saber
2020	Curtis McDowald	United States	Tokyo	24th Place Men's Individual Epee
2000	Arlene Stevens	United States	Sydney	32nd Place Women's Individual Epee
2004	Jonathan Tiomkin	United States	Athens	30th Place Men's Individual Foil
2008	Dagmara Wozniak	United States	Beijing	Women's Individual Saber
2012	Dagmara Wozniak	United States	London	8th Place Women's Individual Saber
2016	Dagmara Wozniak	United States	Rio	24th Place Women's Individual Saber; Women's Team Saber
2020	Dagmara Wozniak	United States	Tokyo	25th Place Women's Individual Saber

== Individual championships ==
St. John's has won 27 individual national championships between the men's and women's teams.

Individual Champions
Women's Foil	Women's Épée	Women's Sabre
Erzsebet Garay (2006); Monika Golebiewski (2008); Evgeniya Kirpicheva (2012)	Tina Loven (1995); Nicole Dygert (1996); Emese Takacs (2001); Isis Washington (2015)	Karolina Cieślar (2019)
Men's Foil	Men's Épée	Men's Sabre
Andras Nemeth (2017); Jan Jurkiewicz (2023)	George Hentea (1998); Alex Roylblat (1999); Arpad Horvath (2002, 2004); Marat Israelian (2010, 2011); Yevgeniy Karyuchenko (2014); Cooper Schumacher (2017)	Andre Deladrier (1942); Keeth Smart (1997, 1999); Ivan Lee (2001, 2002); Sergey Isayenko (2005); Daryl Homer (2010, 2011); Darii Lukashenko (2025)

== Year-by-year results ==
=== Men's Fencing ===
St. John's Men's Fencing Results by Season
Year	Conference	Head coach	Overall Record	Pct.	NCAA Championship
1994-1995	Independent	Yury Gelman			NCAA Runner-Up
1995-1996	Independent	Yury Gelman			3rd Place
1996-1997	Independent	Yury Gelman			3rd Place
1997-1998	Independent	Yury Gelman			5th Place
1998-1999	Independent	Yury Gelman			5th Place
1999-2000	Independent	Yury Gelman			NCAA Runner-Up
2000-2001	Independent	Yury Gelman			NCAA Champion
2001-2002	Independent	Yury Gelman			NCAA Runner-Up
2002-2003	Independent	Yury Gelman			3rd Place
2003-2004	Independent	Yury Gelman			4th Place
2004-2005	Independent	Yury Gelman	9–2	(.818)	3rd Place
2005-2006	Independent	Yury Gelman	–	(–)	6th Place
2006-2007	Independent	Yury Gelman	–	(–)	NCAA Runner-Up
2007-2008	Independent	Yury Gelman	–	(–)	5th Place
2008-2009	Independent	Yury Gelman	–	(–)	6th Place
2009-2010	Independent	Yury Gelman	11–5	(.688)	NCAA Runner-Up
2010-2011	Independent	Yury Gelman	16–2	(.889)	3rd Place
2011-2012	Independent	Yury Gelman	15–4	(.789)	4th Place
2012-2013	Independent	Yury Gelman	13–6	(.684)	5th Place
2013-2014	Independent	Yury Gelman	12–7	(.632)	3rd Place
2014-2015	Independent	Yury Gelman	14–5	(.737)	6th Place
2015-2016	Independent	Yury Gelman	9–1	(.900)	4th Place
2016-2017	Independent	Yury Gelman	11–8	(.579)	6th Place
2017-2018	Independent	Yury Gelman	12–9	(.571)	6th Place
2018-2019	Independent	Yury Gelman	8–8	(.500)	5th Place
2019-2020	Independent	Yury Gelman	16–3	(.842)	Cancelled due to the coronavirus pandemic
2020-2021	Independent	Yury Gelman	7–2	(.778)	5th Place
2021-2022	Independent	Yury Gelman	9–8	(.529)	7th Place
2022-2023	Independent	Yury Gelman	12–12	(.500)	7th Place
2023-2024	Independent	Yury Gelman	12–13	(.480)	7th Place
2024-2025	Independent	Yury Gelman	15–6	(.714)	5th Place
2025-2026	Independent	Yury Gelman	17–4	(.810)	3rd Place

=== Women's Fencing ===
Year	Wins	Losses	Pct.	NCAA Tournament
2004-2005	8	3	(.727)	3rd
2005-2006			(–)	6th
2006-2007			(–)	2nd
2007-2008			(–)	5th
2008-2009			(–)	6th
2009-2010			(–)	2nd
2010-2011			(–)	3rd
2011-2012			(–)	4th
2012-2013			(–)	5th
2013-2014			(–)	3rd
2014-2015			(–)	6th
2015-2016			(–)	4th
2016-2017			(–)	6th
2017-2018			(–)	6th
2018-2019			(–)	5th
2019-2020	Cancelled due Covid-19			
2020-2021	3	7	(.300)	5th
2021-2022	3	14	(.176)	7th
2022-2023	7	18	(.280)	7th
2023-2024	17	8	(.680)	7th
2024-2025	11	10	(.524)	5th
2025-2026	10	11	(.476)	14th

|}

== Coaches ==
- Yury Gelman (born 1955), Ukrainian-born American 7-time Olympic fencing coach
- Sergey Danilov (born 1981), Russian-born American Olympic fencing coach
