= Pete Close =

American middle-distance runner

Pete Close (28 August 1937 – 14 March 1990) was an American middle-distance runner who competed in the 1960 Summer Olympics.

Close competed for the St. John's Red Storm track and field team in the NCAA.
