= Margrete Mørch =

Norwegian fencer

Personal information
- Born: 23 July 1977 (age 48) Oslo, Norway
- Height: 1.76 m (5 ft 9 in)

Sport
- Sport: Fencing
- Event: Epée
- Club: Bygdøy

Margrete Mørch (born 23 June 1977) is a Norwegian fencer.

== Biography ==
She is the granddaughter of Claus Mørch Sr., daughter of Claus Mørch Jr. and niece of Ole Mørch, who all fenced for Norway at the Olympics. She grew up at Bygdøy in Oslo, and graduated from Fagerborg Upper Secondary School in 1997.

She made her national breakthrough at the 1991 Norwegian Championships, where she, aged only 14, made her way to the final. Here she lost out to Nina Steenland. She and her brother Claus Mørch were coached by Mariusz Piasecki.

Mørch and Steenland were the Norwegian competitors at the 1994 World Championships, but both made an early exit. She placed fourteenth at the 1996 European Championships, and won the Junior World Cup 1996–97. Margrete Mørch also became national champion in 1994 and 1995.

At the 1999 World Championships, Mørch participated in team epée together with Ragnhild Andenæs and Silvia Lesoil. Clinching against Italy for the 8th place, Mørch won her last match to secure a 45–44 victory. The 8th place qualified the Norwegian team for the 2000 Olympics. Mørch also became national champion in 1999 and 2000.

She finished 26th in the individual epée and 8th in the team épée event at the 2000 Summer Olympics. Mørch also tried to qualify for the 2004 Olympics, having two leg surgeries Despite failing to qualify, she continued fencing and became national champion every year from 2002 through 2010.
