= Tatiana Logunova =

Russian épée fencer

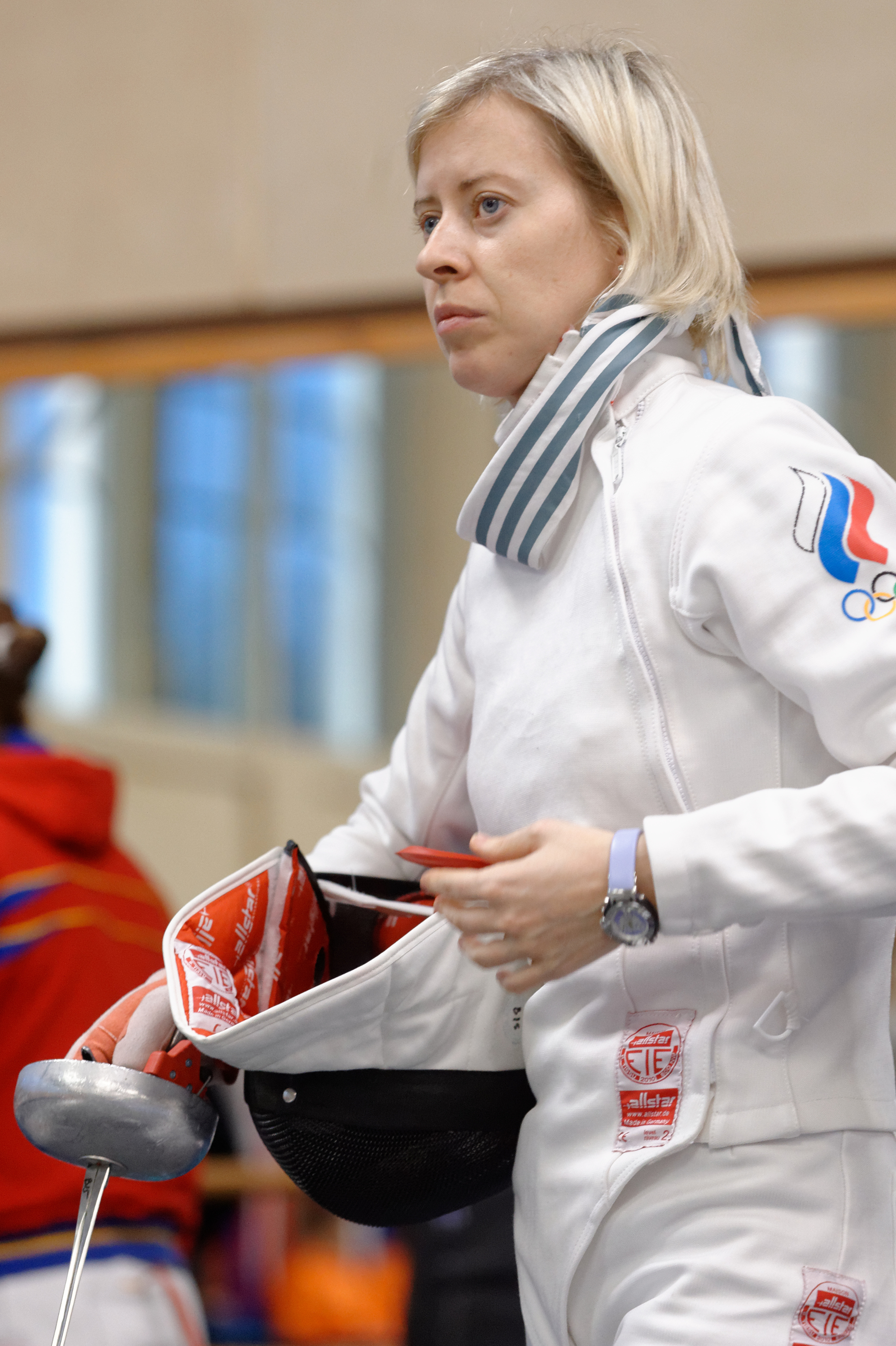
- Logunova in 2015

Personal information
- Born: 3 July 1980 (age 46) Moscow, Russian SFSR, Soviet Union
- Height: 1.74 m (5 ft 9 in)
- Weight: 60 kg (130 lb)

Fencing career
- Sport: Fencing
- Country: Russia
- Weapon: Épée
- Hand: Right-handed
- Club: Dynamo Moscow
- Personal coach: Maria Mazina
- FIE ranking: current ranking
Medal record
Women's épée fencing
Representing Russia
Olympic Games
Gold medal – first place	2000 Sydney	Team épée
Gold medal – first place	2004 Athens	Team épée
Bronze medal – third place	2016 Rio de Janeiro	Team épée
World Championships
Gold medal – first place	2001 Nîmes	Team épée
Gold medal – first place	2003 Havana	Team épée
Silver medal – second place	2007 St Petersburg	Team épée
Bronze medal – third place	2010 Paris	Individual épée
European Championships
Gold medal – first place	2003 Bourges	Individual épée
Gold medal – first place	2012 Legnano	Team épée
Silver medal – second place	2001 Montreux	Team épée
Silver medal – second place	2006 İzmir	Individual épée
Silver medal – second place	2011 Sheffield	Team épée
Summer Universiade
Gold medal – first place	2003 Daegu	Team épée
Silver medal – second place	1997 Catania	Team épée
Silver medal – second place	2001 Beijing	Team épée
Bronze medal – third place	1999 Palma de Mallorca	Individual épée

Tatiana Yuryevna Logunova (Russian: Татьяна Юрьевна Логунова, born 3 July 1980 in Moscow) is a Russian épée fencer. She won two gold medals in the team épée event at the 2000 and 2004 Summer Olympics.
