= Yang Shaoqi =

Chinese fencer

Personal information
- Born: 8 February 1976 (age 50)

Sport
- Sport: Fencing
Medal record
Women's fencing
Representing China
Olympic Games
Bronze medal – third place	2000 Sydney	Épée, team

Yang Shaoqi (杨绍崎 or 杨劭琦, pinyin: Yáng Shàoqí, born 8 February 1976) is a Chinese fencer. She won a bronze medal in the women's team épée event at the 2000 Summer Olympics.
