= Jūlija Vansoviča =

Latvian fencer (born 1975)

Personal information
- Born: 24 August 1975 (age 50) Riga, Latvia

Sport
- Sport: Fencing

Jūlija Vansoviča (born 24 August 1975) is a Latvian fencer. She competed in the women's individual épée event at the 2000 Summer Olympics.
