= Cristiana Cascioli =

Italian fencer (born 1975)

Personal information
- Born: 10 August 1975 (age 50) Narni, Italy

Sport
- Sport: Fencing

Cristiana Cascioli (born 10 August 1975) is an Italian former fencer. She competed in the women's individual épée events at the 2000 and 2004 Summer Olympics.
