= Silvia Lesoil =

Norwegian fencer

Personal information
- Full name: Silvia Helene Lesoil
- Born: 9 December 1975 (age 50) Besançon, France
- Height: 1.71 m (5 ft 7 in)

Sport
- Sport: Fencing
- Event: Epée
- Club: Bygdøy

Silvia Lesoil (born 9 December 1975) is a Norwegian fencer. She finished 33rd in the individual épée and 8th in the team épée event at the 2000 Summer Olympics. Between 1992 and 1998, Lesoil won the Norwegian National Championship five times; her main competitor being Margrete Mørch who won two titles in between those of Lesoil.
