= Evelyn Halls =

Australian fencer

Personal information
- Born: 18 August 1972 (age 53) Melbourne, Australia

Sport
- Sport: Fencing

Evelyn Halls (born 18 August 1972) is an Australian fencer. She competed in the women's individual épée events at the 2000 and 2004 Summer Olympics. Aside from competing in two Olympic Games, Halls' career highlights also include winning six Commonwealth gold medals, 13 National Championship titles and 11 World Cup medals.

She joined the board of the Australian Fencing Federation in 2014 where she also served as President until 2019, she is also a member of the FIE Women in Fencing Council and is an Integrity Commissioner for Cricket Victoria.

Halls was Australia's Chef de Mission for the 2018 Buenos Aires Youth Olympic Games and in May 2019, was announced as Australia's joint Deputy Chef de Mission, alongside fellow Olympians, Susie O'Neill and Kim Brennan for the Tokyo 2020 Olympic Games.

Away from sport, Halls was formerly a corporate partner at international law firm Herbert Smith Freehills and currently works as an Ombudsman in the financial services sector.
