= Andrea Rentmeister =

Austrian chemist and fencer

Personal information
- Born: 28 December 1977 (age 48) Graz, Austria

Sport
- Sport: Fencing

Andrea Rentmeister (born 28 December 1977) is an Austrian chemist and fencer. She competed in the women's individual épée event at the 2000 Summer Olympics. After completing her studies of chemical engineering and chemistry at the Universities of Graz and Bonn, earning her a PhD, she became a postdoctoral researcher at the lab of the 2018 Nobel Laureate Frances Arnold at the California Institute of Technology (Caltech) in 2007. In 2010, she became a junior professor for Biochemistry at the University of Hamburg. Until 2023, she held a position as professor for biomolecular label chemistry at the University of Münster before becoming a chair holder at LMU Munich for Organic and Biological Chemistry in 2024.
