= Liang Qin =

Chinese fencer (born 1972)

Personal information
- Born: 28 July 1972 (age 53)

Sport
- Sport: Fencing
Medal record
Women's fencing
Representing China
Olympic Games
Bronze medal – third place	2000 Sydney	Épée, team

Liang Qin (Chinese: 梁琴; pinyin: Liáng Qín; born 28 July 1972) is a Chinese fencer. She won a bronze medal in the women's team épée event at the 2000 Summer Olympics.
