= Sophie Lamon =

Swiss fencer

Personal information
- Born: 8 February 1985 (age 41) Sion, Switzerland

Sport
- Sport: Fencing
Medal record
Women's fencing
Representing Switzerland
Olympic Games
| Silver medal – second place | 2000 Sydney | Team épée |

Sophie Lamon (born 8 February 1985) is a Swiss former fencer. She won a silver medal in the women's team épée event at the 2000 Summer Olympics.
