= Zahra Gamir =

Algerian fencer (born 1966)

Personal information
- Born: 18 April 1966 (age 58)

Sport
- Sport: Fencing

Zahra Gamir (born 18 April 1966) is an Algerian fencer. She competed in the women's individual épée events at the 2000 and 2004 Summer Olympics, losing her only bout in each competition.
