= Arlene Stevens =

American fencer (born 1981)

Personal information
- Born: February 20, 1981 (age 45) Fairport, New York, United States

Sport
- Sport: Fencing

Arlene Stevens (born February 20, 1981) is a retired American epee fencer. Stevens is lauded as "one of the most decorated fencers in program history," at St. John's University.

== NCAA ==
Stevens competed while attending St. John's University, from 1999 to 2003.

4 time All-American fencer.

Silver medalist at the NCAA Championships in 2001.

Silver medalist at the Intercollegiate Fencing Association Championships.

== US Championships ==
Stevens won the individual women's épée U.S. National Championship in both 1998 and 1999.

== Olympics ==
Stevens competed in the Olympics at Sydney, Australia, surviving the first round before being defeated by Ildikó Mincza of Hungary. Stevens was the youngest in the world to qualify for an Olympic fencing team.

Olympic Results

Round 1 - Arlene Stevens (US) def. Zahra Gamir (Algeria) 5-2
Round 2 - Ildikó Mincza (Hungary) def. Arlene Stevens (US) 11-8

== Miscellaneous ==
Stevens is 5'11", left handed, of European and Chinese descent, and has also practiced ballet and gymnastics.

== See also ==
- Fencing at the 2000 Summer Olympics
