= Claus Mørch Sr. =

Norwegian fencer

Personal information
- Born: 16 April 1912 Oslo, Norway
- Died: 14 March 2004 (aged 91) Oslo, Norway

Sport
- Sport: Fencing

Claus Mørch Sr. (16 April 1912 – 14 March 2004) was a Norwegian fencer. He competed in the individual and team épée events at the 1948 Summer Olympics. His son Claus Mørch Jr. fenced for Norway at the 1972 Summer Olympics and his granddaughter, Margrete Mørch, fenced at the 2000 Summer Olympics.
