= Diana Romagnoli =

Swiss fencer

Personal information
- Born: 14 February 1977 (age 49) Männedorf, Switzerland

Sport
- Sport: Fencing
Medal record
Women's fencing
Representing Switzerland
Olympic Games
Silver medal – second place	2000 Sydney	Épée, team

Diana Romagnoli (born 14 February 1977) is a Swiss fencer. She won a silver medal in the women's team épée event at the 2000 Summer Olympics.
