= Zuleydis Ortiz =

Cuban fencer (born 1978)

Personal information
- Born: 31 January 1976 (age 50) Santiago de Cuba, Cuba

Sport
- Sport: Fencing
Medal record
Representing Cuba
World Championships
Silver medal – second place	1997 Cape Town	Individual épée
Silver medal – second place	1998 La Chaux-de-Fonds	Team épée
Pan American Games
Gold medal – first place	1999 Winnipeg	Team épée
Gold medal – first place	2003 Santo Domingo	Team épée
Silver medal – second place	1995 Mar del Plata	Team épée
Central American and Caribbean Games
Gold medal – first place	1998 Maracaibo	Team épée
Gold medal – first place	2006 Cartagena	Team épée
Gold medal – first place	2006 Cartagena	Individual épée
Bronze medal – third place	1998 Maracaibo	Individual épée

Zuleydis Ortiz Puentes (born 31 January 1976) is a Cuban fencer. She competed in the women's individual and team épée events at the 2000 Summer Olympics.
