= Claus Mørch Jr. =

Norwegian fencer

Personal information
- Born: 18 February 1947 (age 79) Oslo, Norway

Sport
- Sport: Fencing

Claus Mørch Jr. (born 18 February 1947) is a Norwegian fencer. He competed in the team épée event at the 1972 Summer Olympics. His father, Claus Mørch Sr. fenced for Norway at the 1948 Summer Olympics and his daughter, Margrete Mørch, competed at the 2000 Summer Olympics.
