= Tamara Esteri =

Cuban fencer (born 1966)

Tamara Esteri Almeida
Personal information
- Born: 24 August 1966 (age 59) Havana, Cuba

Sport
- Sport: Fencing
Medal record
Representing Cuba
World Championships
Silver medal – second place	1998 La Chaux-de-Fonds	Team épée
Pan American Games
Gold medal – first place	1987 Indianapolis	Individual épée
Gold medal – first place	1999 Winnipeg	Team épée
Silver medal – second place	1999 Winnipeg	Individual épée
Central American and Caribbean Games
Gold medal – first place	1998 Maracaibo	Team épée

Tamara Esteri Almeida (born 24 August 1966) is a Cuban fencer. She competed in the women's individual and team épée events at the 1996 and 2000 Summer Olympics.
