= Sangita Tripathi =

French fencer

Personal information
- Born: 8 July 1968 (age 58) Paris, France

Sport
- Sport: Fencing
Medal record
Representing France
World Championships
Gold medal – first place	1998 La Chaux-de-Fonds	Team épée
Silver medal – second place	1995 The Hague	Team épée
Summer Universiade
Silver medal – second place	1993 Buffalo	Individual épée
Silver medal – second place	1993 Buffalo	Team épée
Bronze medal – third place	1991 Sheffield	Team épée

Sangita Tripathi (born 8 July 1968) is a French fencer. She competed in the women's individual and team épée events at the 2000 Summer Olympics.
