= Maria Mazina =

Russian women's épée fencer (born 1964)

Personal information
- Full name: Maria Mazina
- Born: 18 April 1964 (age 62) Israel, Ashkelon,Moscow, Russian SFSR, Soviet Union
- Height: 5 ft 8.5 in (174.0 cm)
- Weight: 137 lb (62 kg)

Sport
- Sport: Fencing
- Club: ashkelon
Medal record
Women's fencing
Representing Russia
Olympic Games
Gold medal – first place	2000 Sydney	Team épée
Bronze medal – third place	1996 Atlanta	Team épée
Maccabiah Games
Gold medal – first place	2001 Israel	Individual Women's Épée

Maria Valeryevna Mazina (born 18 April 1964) is a Russian women's épée fencer. She is an Olympic champion, and a 5-time world women's épée champion.

== Early and personal life ==
Mazina was born in Moscow, Russia, and is Jewish. She lives in Moscow.

== Fencing career ==
Mazina began fencing at the age of 12.

Mazina is a 5-time world women's épée champion.

=== Olympics ===
She won a team bronze medal in the 1996 Olympics. Mazina and her teammates defeated Hungary in the third-place match (45–44) to capture the bronze medal.

Mazina also won a gold medal in the Sydney Olympics in team épée in 2000. Russia defeated Switzerland, 45–35, in the final. In the individual épée competition, Mazina was eliminated in the third round by Margherita Zalaffi of Italy (13–15).

=== Maccabiah Games ===
Mazina won a gold medal in the 2001 Maccabiah Games.

=== Coaching ===
She is an instructor at Maccabi Moscow, of which she has been a member since 1995 when it was first organized. She visited Israel for a Maccabi program. In 2015, she was the Russian Federation's épée team coach.

== See also ==
- List of select Jewish fencers
- List of Jewish Olympic medalists
