= Gianna Hablützel-Bürki =

Swiss fencer

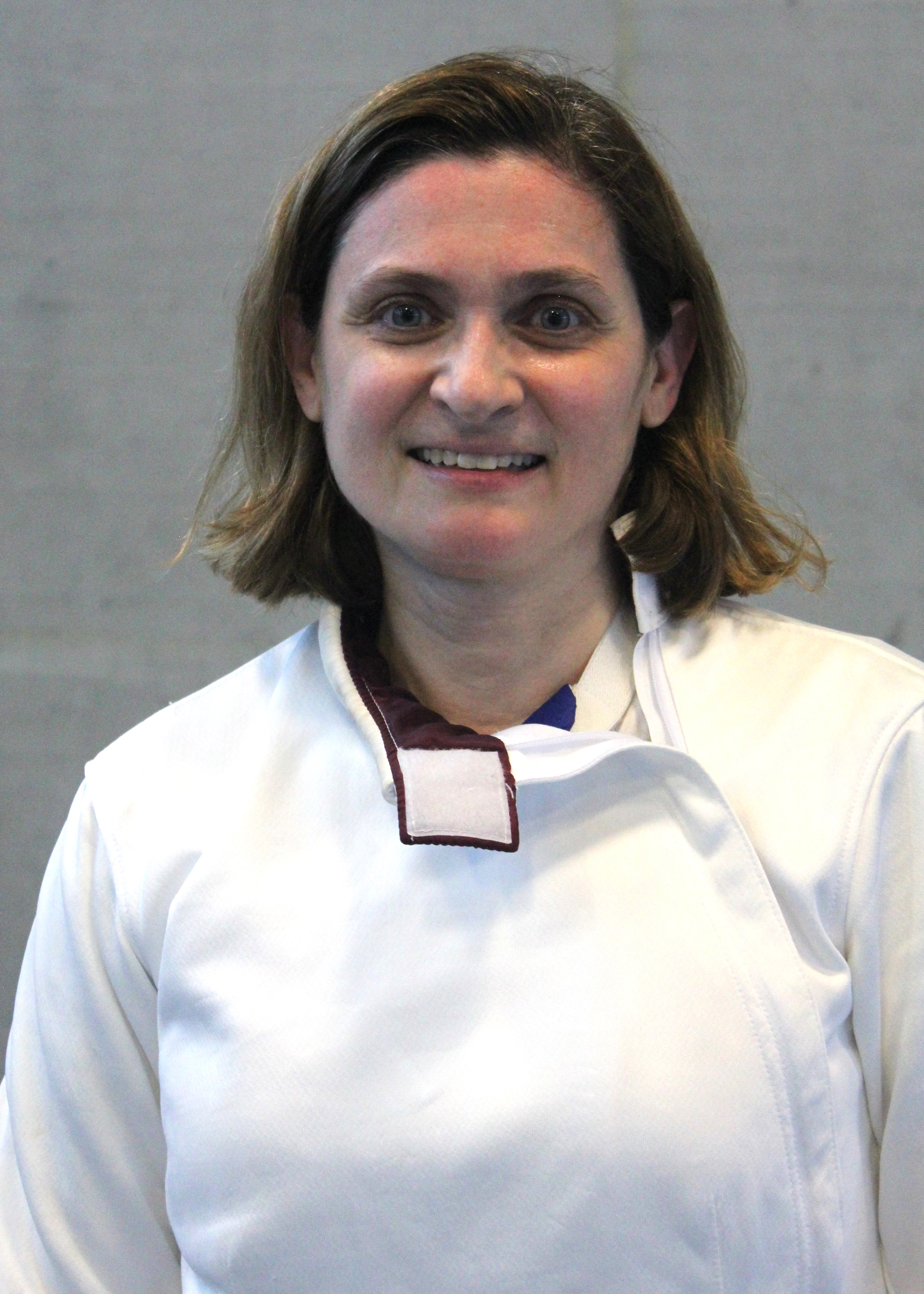
- Born: Gianna Bürki; 22 December 1969 (age 56); Basel, Switzerland
- Other names: Gianna Habluetzel-Buerki, Gianna Buerki
- Occupation: Épée fencer
- Spouse: Christoph Hablützel
- Children: 1
- Website: http://www.fechten.ch

Gianna Hablützel-Bürki (née Bürki; born 22 December 1969 in Basel) is a Swiss épée fencer.

== Life ==
She married Christoph Hablützel in 1997. They have a daughter named Demi, born in 1998 and currently live in Riehen/Basel-City

=== Occupation ===
- Épée fencer
- Founder & Co-president of the 'Fechtverein Basel' – & Riehen-Scorpions
- Youth fencing trainer
- President of the Swiss Olympic Athletes Commission (SOAC)

== Career ==
Olympic medal record

Women's Fencing
Silver medal – second place	2000 Sydney	Épée Individual
Silver medal – second place	2000 Sydney	Épée Team

=== Individual ===
- 9-times Swiss Champion
- 4-times World Cup winner
- 2-times bronze medal winner at the European Championships (1994 + 1995)
- 2-times silver medal winner at the European Championships (1993 + 1996)
- Ranked 11th at the Olympic Games 1996 in Atlanta
- Silver medal winner at the Olympic Games 2000 in Sydney
- Bronze medal winner at the World Championships 2001 in Nîmes

=== Team ===
- 6-times Swiss Champion
- Bronze medal winner at the World Championships 1989 in Denver
- Ranked 4th at the World Championships 1999 in Seoul
- European Champion 2000 in Madeira
- Silver medal winner at the Olympic Games 2000 in Sydney
- Silver medal winner at the World Championships 2001 in Nîmes
- 1995 French Champion with Racing Club de France, Paris

== See also ==
Fencing at the 2000 Summer Olympics
