= Ragnhild Andenæs =

Norwegian fencer (born 1977)

Personal information
- Born: 28 September 1977 (age 48) Oslo, Norway

Sport
- Sport: Fencing

Ragnhild Andenæs (born 28 September 1977) is a Norwegian fencer. She competed in the women's individual and team épée events at the 2000 Summer Olympics.
