= Denmark at the 2000 Summer Olympics =

- IOC code: DEN
- NOC: National Olympic Committee and Sports Confederation of Denmark
- Website: www.dif.dk (in Danish and English)

in Sydney
- Competitors: 97 (53 men and 44 women) in 16 sports
- Flag bearers: Jesper Bank (opening); Torben Grimmel (closing)
- Medals Ranked 30th: Gold 2 Silver 3 Bronze 1 Total 6

Summer Olympics appearances (overview)
- 1896; 1900; 1904; 1908; 1912; 1920; 1924; 1928; 1932; 1936; 1948; 1952; 1956; 1960; 1964; 1968; 1972; 1976; 1980; 1984; 1988; 1992; 1996; 2000; 2004; 2008; 2012; 2016; 2020; 2024

Other related appearances
- 1906 Intercalated Games

Denmark competed at the 2000 Summer Olympics in Sydney, Australia.

== Medalist ==
| Medal | Name | Sport | Event | Date |
|---|---|---|---|---|
| Gold | Karen Brødsgaard, Katrine Fruelund; Maja Grønbæk, Lotte Kiærskou; Karin Mortensen, Anja Nielsen; Rikke Schmidt, Christina Roslyng; Mette Vestergaard, Anette Hoffmann; Camilla Andersen, Janne Kolling; Lene Rantala, Tina Bøttzau; Tonje Kjærgaard | Handball | Women's tournament | September 30 |
| Gold | Henrik Blakskjær; Thomas Jacobsen; Jesper Bank | Sailing | Men's Soling Class | September 30 |
| Silver | Wilson Kipketer | Athletics | Men's 800 meters | September 27 |
| Silver | Camilla Martin | Badminton | Women's singles | September 22 |
| Silver | Torben Grimmel | Shooting | Men's 50m Rifle Prone | September 21 |
| Bronze | Thomas Ebert; Søren Madsen; Eskild Ebbesen; Victor Feddersen | Rowing | Men's Lightweight Coxless Fours | September 24 |

== Archery ==
| Athlete | Event | Ranking round | | Round of 64 | Round of 32 | Round of 16 | Quarterfinals | Semifinals | Final / BM | |
| Athlete | Event | Score | Seed | Opposition Score | Opposition Score | Opposition Score | Opposition Score | Opposition Score | Opposition Score | Rank |
|---|---|---|---|---|---|---|---|---|---|---|
| Katja Brix Poulson | Women's individual | 609 | 57 | Pi-yu (TPE) (8); L 152–161 | did not advance | | | | | 57 |

== Athletics ==
Men
Track & road events

| Athlete | Event | Heat | | Semifinal | | Final | |
| Athlete | Event | Result | Rank | Result | Rank | Result | Rank |
|---|---|---|---|---|---|---|---|
| Wilson Kipketer | 800 metres | 01:45.57 | 1 Q | 01:44.22 | 1 Q | 01:45.14 | |

Field events

| Athlete | Event | Qualification | | Final | |
| Athlete | Event | Distance | Position | Distance | Position |
|---|---|---|---|---|---|
| Jan Bielecki | Hammer throw | 70.46 | 33 | did not advance | |
| Joachim Olsen | Shot put | 19.41 | 17 | did not advance | |

Women
Field events

| Athlete | Event | Qualification | | Final | |
| Athlete | Event | Distance | Position | Distance | Position |
|---|---|---|---|---|---|
| Marie Rasmussen | Pole vault | 4.30 NR | 7 q | 4.35 NR | 8 |

== Badminton ==
Camilla Martin won Denmark's only medal in the Women's Singles event. She took the silver after losing to Gong Zhichao of China in the finals.

Men

| Athlete | Event | Round of 64 | Round of 32 | Round of 16 | Quarterfinal | Semifinal | Final / BM | |
| Athlete | Event | Opposition Score | Opposition Score | Opposition Score | Opposition Score | Opposition Score | Opposition Score | Rank |
|---|---|---|---|---|---|---|---|---|
| Peter Gade | Men's singles | BYE | Constantin (MRI); W 15–3, 15–9 | Permadi (TPE); W 15–8, 15–7 | Mainaky (INA); W 15–6, 15–6 | Ji (CHN); L 9–15, 15–1, 9–15 | Xia (CHN); L 13–15, 5–15 | 4 |
| Poul-Erik Høyer Larsen | Men's singles | BYE | Jun (CHN); L 3–15, 17–16, 10–15 | did not advance | | | | |
| Kenneth Jonassen | Men's singles | Shon (KOR); W 14–17, 15–8, 17–15 | Kuijten (BEL); W 15–8, 15–5 | Wong (MAS); L 6–15, 7–15 | did not advance | | | |
| Martin Lundgaard Hansen; Lars Paaske | Men's doubles | —N/a | Popov / Stoyanov (BUL); W 15–6, 15–6 | Mainaky / Subagja (INA); L 9–15, 15–13, 7–15 | did not advance | | | |
| Jim Laugesen; Michael Søgaard | Men's doubles | —N/a | BYE | Gunawan / Wijaya (INA); L 9–15, 7–15 | did not advance | | | |
| Jesper Larsen; Jens Eriksen | Men's doubles | —N/a | BYE | Olynyk / Moody (CAN); W 15–2, 15–1 | Lee / Yoo (KOR); L 12–15, 10–15 | did not advance | | 5 |

Women

| Athlete | Event | Round of 64 | Round of 32 | Round of 16 | Quarterfinal | Semifinal | Final / BM | |
| Athlete | Event | Opposition Score | Opposition Score | Opposition Score | Opposition Score | Opposition Score | Opposition Score | Rank |
|---|---|---|---|---|---|---|---|---|
| Camilla Martin | Women's singles | BYE | Angelina (INA); W 11–6, 11–2 | Morgan (GBR); W 11–7, 11–3 | Audina (NED); W 11–2, 11–1 | Yun (CHN); W 11–5, 11–0 | Gong (CHN); L 10–13, 3–11 | |
| Mette Sørensen | Women's singles | Ekmongkolpaisarn (THA); W 11–7, 13–10 | Ida (JPN); W 13–12, 11–7 | Ye (CHN); L 4–11, 6–11 | did not advance | | | |
| Ann-Lou Jørgensen; Mette Schjoldager | Women's doubles | —N/a | Evtoushenko / Nozdran (UKR); W 15–3, 11–15, 15–11 | Tantri / Tuwankotta (INA); L 16–17, 10–15 | did not advance | | | |
| Ann Jørgensen; Majken Vange | Women's doubles | —N/a | Grether / Stechmann (GER); L 13–15, 6–15 | did not advance | | | | |
| Rikke Olsen; Helene Kirkegaard | Women's doubles | —N/a | Koon / Ling (HKG); W 15–9, 13–15, 15–5 | Yakusheva / Ruslyakova (RUS); W 17–16, 15–5 | Chung / Ra (KOR); L 15–12, 12–15, 5–15 | did not advance | | 5 |

Mixed

| Athlete | Event | Round of 64 | Round of 32 | Round of 16 | Quarterfinal | Semifinal | Final / BM | |
| Athlete | Event | Opposition Score | Opposition Score | Opposition Score | Opposition Score | Opposition Score | Opposition Score | Rank |
|---|---|---|---|---|---|---|---|---|
| Jon Holst-Christensen; Ann Jørgensen | Mixed doubles | —N/a | Lee / Lee (KOR); W 17–15, 15–12 | Archer / Goode (GBR); L 17–15, 11–15, 7–15 | did not advance | | | |
| Michael Søgaard; Rikke Olsen | Mixed doubles | —N/a | BYE | Beres / Solmundson (CAN); W 15–8, 15–2 | Suprianto / Resiana (INA); W 17–14, 10–15, 15–11 | Zhang / Gao (CHN); L 15–10, 6–15, 16–17 | Archer / Goode (GBR); L 1–15, 10–15 | 4 |
| Jens Eriksen; Mette Schjoldager | Mixed doubles | —N/a | BYE | Keck / Pitro (GER); W 15–7, 15–6 | Kusharjanto / Timur (INA); L 3–15, 8–15 | did not advance | | 5 |

== Canoeing ==
=== Sprint ===
Men

| Athlete | Event | Heats | | Semifinals | | Final | |
| Athlete | Event | Time | Rank | Time | Rank | Time | Rank |
|---|---|---|---|---|---|---|---|
| Torsten Tranum | K-1 1000 m | 03:35.841 | 2 Q | 03:38.865 | 2 Q | 03:37.811 | 6 |
| Paw Madsen; Jesper Staal | K-2 500 m | 01:32.613 | 4 q | 01:32.867 | 4 | did not advance | |
| Paw Madsen; Jesper Staal | K-2 1000 m | 03:16.989 | 4 q | 03:18.206 | 4 | did not advance | |

== Cycling ==
=== Road ===
| Athlete | Event | Time | Rank |
|---|---|---|---|
| Frank Høj | Men's road race | 5:30:34 | 6 |
| Lars Michaelsen | Men's road race | DNF | |
| Michael Sandstød | Men's road race | DNF | |
| Michael Sandstød | Men's time trial | DNF | |
| Nicki Sørensen | Men's road race | 5:30:46 | 40 |
| Rolf Sørensen | Men's road race | 5:30:46 | 59 |

=== Track ===
Points race

| Athlete | Event | Points | Laps | Rank |
|---|---|---|---|---|
| Jimmi Madsen | Men's points race | 0 | 2 | 23 |
| Jakob Storm Piil; Jimmi Madsen | Men's madison | 5 | 0 | 12 |

=== Mountain biking ===
| Athlete | Event | Time | Rank |
|---|---|---|---|
| Jesper Agergård | Men's cross-country | LAP | 36 |
| Michael Rasmussen | Men's cross-country | 2:18:15.57 | 22 |

== Equestrian ==
=== Dressage ===
| Athlete | Horse | Event | Grand Prix | | Grand Prix Special | | Grand Prix Freestyle | | Overall | |
| Athlete | Horse | Event | Score | Rank | Score | Rank | Technical | Artistic | Score | Rank |
|---|---|---|---|---|---|---|---|---|---|---|
| Jon Pedersen | Esprit de Valdemar | Individual | 1728 | 11 Q | 136.51 | 16 Q | 204.18 | 15 | 204.18 | 15 |
| Morton Thomsen | Gay | Individual | 1536 | 45 | did not advance | | | | | |
| Anne van Olst | Any How | Individual | 1625 | 29 | did not advance | | | | | |
| Lone Castrup Jørgensen | Kennedy | Individual | 1796 | 8 Q | 146.53 | 6 Q | 216.90 | 7 | 216.90 | 7 |
| Jon Pedersen; Morton Thomsen; Anne van Olst; Lone Castrup Jørgensen | See above | Team | 5149 | 4 | —N/a | | | | 5149 | 4 |

=== Eventing ===
| Athlete | Horse | Event | Dressage | | Cross-country | | | Jumping | | | | | | Total | |
| Athlete | Horse | Event | Dressage | | Cross-country | | | Qualifier | | | Final | | | Total | |
| Athlete | Horse | Event | Penalties | Rank | Penalties | Total | Rank | Penalties | Total | Rank | Penalties | Total | Rank | Penalties | Rank |
|---|---|---|---|---|---|---|---|---|---|---|---|---|---|---|---|
| Nils Haagensen | Discovery II | Individual | 47.2 | 14 | RT | AC | AC | did not advanced | | | | | | | |

=== Show jumping ===
| Athlete | Horse | Event | Qualification | | | | | | | | Final | | | | | Total | |
| Athlete | Horse | Event | Round 1 | | Round 2 | | | Round 3 | | | Round A | | Round B | | | Total | |
| Athlete | Horse | Event | Penalties | Rank | Penalties | Total | Rank | Penalties | Total | Rank | Penalties | Rank | Penalties | Total | Rank | Penalties | Rank |
|---|---|---|---|---|---|---|---|---|---|---|---|---|---|---|---|---|---|
| Thomas Velin | Canute | Individual | 4.75 | 9 | 0.00 | 4.75 | 1 Q | 8.00 | 12.75 | 6 Q | 0.00 | 1 | 12.00 | 12.00 | 10 | 12.00 | 10 |

== Handball ==
Women

=== Preliminary round ===
For the preliminary round, the ten teams were distributed into two groups of five teams. Each team played against each of its four group opponents for a total of four matches. The four best-scoring teams advanced to the quarter-finals.

==== Group B ====
| Pos | Team | Pld | W | D | L | GF | GA | GD | Pts | Qualification |
|---|---|---|---|---|---|---|---|---|---|---|
| 1 | Norway | 4 | 4 | 0 | 0 | 101 | 72 | +29 | 8 | Quarterfinals |
| 2 | Denmark | 4 | 3 | 0 | 1 | 124 | 83 | +41 | 6 | Quarterfinals |
| 3 | Austria | 4 | 2 | 0 | 2 | 131 | 90 | +41 | 4 | Quarterfinals |
| 4 | Brazil | 4 | 1 | 0 | 3 | 100 | 133 | −33 | 2 | Quarterfinals |
| 5 | Australia (H) | 4 | 0 | 0 | 4 | 59 | 137 | −78 | 0 | Ninth place game |

(H) Hosts

| 17 September 2000; 16:30 | Denmark | 17–19 | Norway | Pavilion 2, Sydney; Referees: Garcia, Moréno (FRA) |
| 17 September 2000; 16:30 | four players 3 | (7–10) | Bjerkrheim, Grini 4 | Pavilion 2, Sydney; Referees: Garcia, Moréno (FRA) |
| 17 September 2000; 16:30 | 3× (yellow card) 4× (suspension) | | 3× (yellow card) 2× (suspension) | Pavilion 2, Sydney; Referees: Garcia, Moréno (FRA) |

| 19 September 2000; 21:30 | Austria | 26–30 | Denmark | Pavilion 2, Sydney; Referees: Kohout, Dolejš (CZE) |
| 19 September 2000; 21:30 | Fridrikas 11 | (13–16) | Andersen, Kiærskou 7 | Pavilion 2, Sydney; Referees: Kohout, Dolejš (CZE) |
| 19 September 2000; 21:30 | 3× (yellow card) 1× (suspension) | | 2× (yellow card) 3× (suspension) | Pavilion 2, Sydney; Referees: Kohout, Dolejš (CZE) |

| 21 September 2000; 19:30 | Australia | 12–38 | Denmark | Pavilion 2, Sydney; Referees: Chung, Lim (KOR) |
| 21 September 2000; 19:30 | Kahmke 5 | (6–18) | Andersen, Roslyng 7 | Pavilion 2, Sydney; Referees: Chung, Lim (KOR) |
| 21 September 2000; 19:30 | 1× (yellow card) 2× (suspension) | | 3× (yellow card) 3× (suspension) | Pavilion 2, Sydney; Referees: Chung, Lim (KOR) |

| 25 September 2000; 14:30 | Denmark | 39–26 | Brazil | Pavilion 2, Sydney; Referees: Bojsen, Anusic (USA) |
| 25 September 2000; 14:30 | Kiærskou 9 | (19–12) | Sales 9 | Pavilion 2, Sydney; Referees: Bojsen, Anusic (USA) |
| 25 September 2000; 14:30 | 3× (yellow card) 1× (suspension) | | 3× (yellow card) 4× (suspension) | Pavilion 2, Sydney; Referees: Bojsen, Anusic (USA) |

=== Quarterfinals ===
28 September 2000
19:30
France
26–28 (ET)
Denmark
The Dome, Sydney
Referees: Marić, Gardinovački (FRY)
Myaro 11
(8–13)
Andersen 7
3× (yellow card) 1× (suspension)

3× (yellow card) 1× (suspension)

FT: 24–24 ET: 2–4

=== Semifinals ===
| 29 September 2000; 19:30 | South Korea | 29–31 | Denmark | The Dome, Sydney; Referees: Gallego, Lamas (ESP) |
| 29 September 2000; 19:30 | Lee S., Oh S. 7 | (11–20) | Hoffmann 8 | The Dome, Sydney; Referees: Gallego, Lamas (ESP) |
| 29 September 2000; 19:30 | 3× (yellow card) 5× (suspension) | | 3× (yellow card) 4× (suspension) | The Dome, Sydney; Referees: Gallego, Lamas (ESP) |

=== Gold medal game ===
| 1 October 2000; 16:30 | Denmark | 31–27 | Hungary | The Dome, Sydney; Referees: Garcia, Moréno (FRA) |
| 1 October 2000; 16:30 | Hoffmann 11 | (14–16) | Radulović 9 | The Dome, Sydney; Referees: Garcia, Moréno (FRA) |
| 1 October 2000; 16:30 | 3× (yellow card) 2× (suspension) | | 3× (yellow card) 1× (suspension) | The Dome, Sydney; Referees: Garcia, Moréno (FRA) |

== Modern Pentathlon ==
In June 2000, Pernille Svarre became world pentathlon champion, winning gold at the championship in Pesaro, Italy. The same year, she was the first Danish woman to compete in the modern pentathlon at the Summer Olympics where the discipline was included for the first time.

| Athlete | Event | Shooting (10 m air pistol) | | | Fencing (épée one touch) | | | Swimming (200 m freestyle) | | | Riding (show jumping) | | | Running (3000 m) | | | Total points | Final rank |
| Athlete | Event | Points | Rank | MP Points | Wins | Rank | MP points | Time | Rank | MP points | Penalties | Rank | MP points | Time | Rank | MP Points | Total points | Final rank |
|---|---|---|---|---|---|---|---|---|---|---|---|---|---|---|---|---|---|---|
| Pernille Svarre | Women's | 161 | 23 | 868 | 7 | 24 | 640 | 2:29.94 | 23 | 1101 | 398 | 19 | 702 | 10:22.56 | 2 | 1230 | 4541 | 19 |

== Rowing ==
Men

| Athlete | Event | Heats | | Repechage | | Semifinals | | Final | |
| Athlete | Event | Time | Rank | Time | Rank | Time | Rank | Time | Rank |
|---|---|---|---|---|---|---|---|---|---|
| Bertil Samuelson; Bo Kaliszan | Double Sculls | 6:58.88 | 5 R | 6:30.87 | 2 SF | 6:40.11 | 6 FB | 6:23.20 | 10 |
| Søren Madsen; Thomas Ebert; Eskild Ebbesen; Victor Feddersen | Lightweight coxless four | 6:21.30 | 4 R | 6:08.63 | 1 SF | 6:01.67 | 2 FA | 6:03.51 | |

Women

| Athlete | Event | Heats | | Repechage | | Semifinals | | Final | |
| Athlete | Event | Time | Rank | Time | Rank | Time | Rank | Time | Rank |
|---|---|---|---|---|---|---|---|---|---|
| Bianca Carstensen; Katrin Gleie; Sarah Lauritzen; Dorthe Pedersen | Quadruple Sculls | 6:35.39 | 3 R | 6:35.76 | 2 FA | —N/a | | 6:31.30 | 6 |

== Sailing ==
Denmark competed in seven events during the Sailing competition in Sydney and won one gold medal.

Men

| Athlete | Event | Race | | | | | | | | | | | Net points | Final rank |
| Athlete | Event | 1 | 2 | 3 | 4 | 5 | 6 | 7 | 8 | 9 | 10 | 11 | Net points | Final rank |
|---|---|---|---|---|---|---|---|---|---|---|---|---|---|---|
| Lasse Hjortnaes | Finn | 21 | 21 | ~~23~~ | 12 | 13 | 6 | ~~DNF~~ | 17 | 21 | 13 | 14 | 138 | 20 |

Women

| Athlete | Event | Race | | | | | | | | | | | Net points | Final rank |
| Athlete | Event | 1 | 2 | 3 | 4 | 5 | 6 | 7 | 8 | 9 | 10 | 11 | Net points | Final rank |
|---|---|---|---|---|---|---|---|---|---|---|---|---|---|---|
| Kristine Roug | Europe | 5 | 21 | 2 | 1 | 10 | 6 | 4 | ~~OCS~~ | 16 | 19 | ~~OCS~~ | 84.0 | 10 |
| Susanne Ward; Michaëla Ward-Meehan | Women's 470 | 3 | 10 | 11 | 11 | ~~18~~ | ~~17~~ | 4 | 7 | 15 | 8 | 2 | 71 | 10 |

Open

| Athlete | Event | Race | | | | | | | | | | | | | | | | Net points | Final rank |
| Athlete | Event | 1 | 2 | 3 | 4 | 5 | 6 | 7 | 8 | 9 | 10 | 11 | 12 | 13 | 14 | 15 | 16 | Net points | Final rank |
|---|---|---|---|---|---|---|---|---|---|---|---|---|---|---|---|---|---|---|---|
| Peder Rønholt | Laser | 17 | ~~32~~ | 12 | 4 | 10 | ~~24~~ | 6 | 9 | 17 | 11 | 17 | —N/a | | | | | 103 | 13 |
| Michael Hestbæk; Jonatan Persson | 49er | 8 | 2 | 7 | 13 | ~~17~~ | 8 | 9 | 8 | 16 | 12 | 2 | 5 | ~~OCS~~ | 2 | 7 | 9 | 108 | 9 |
| Stig Raagaard Hansen; Helene Hansen | Tornado | 14 | 15 | ~~16~~ | 6 | 11 | 9 | 10 | 12 | 7 | 12 | ~~17~~ | —N/a | | | | | 96 | 13 |

Match racing

| Athlete | Event | Qualification races | | | | | | Total | Rank | Round Robin 1 | | | | | Rank | Round Robin 2 | | | | | Rank | Quarterfinals | Semifinals | Final / BM | Rank |
| Athlete | Event | 1 | 2 | 3 | 4 | 5 | 6 | Total | Rank | GER | SWE | FRA | UKR | GBR | Rank | GER | RUS | SWE | AUS | USA | Rank | Quarterfinals | Semifinals | Final / BM | Rank |
|---|---|---|---|---|---|---|---|---|---|---|---|---|---|---|---|---|---|---|---|---|---|---|---|---|---|
| Jesper Bank; Henrik Blakskjær; Thomas Jacobsen | Soling | 6 | ~~16~~ | 12 | 12 | 11 | 4 | 45 | 12 q | W | L | W | W | L | 3 Q | W | W | L | W | W | 1 Q | GER L NED W NOR W NZL W RUS W 4–1; 1 Q | Norway; W 3–1 | Germany; W 4–3 | |

== Shooting ==
Men

| Athlete | Event | Qualification | | Final | |
| Athlete | Event | Score | Rank | Score | Rank |
|---|---|---|---|---|---|
| Torben Grimmel | 50 m rifle prone | 597 | 5 Q | 700.4 | |

Women

| Athlete | Event | Qualification | | Final | |
| Athlete | Event | Score | Rank | Score | Rank |
|---|---|---|---|---|---|
| Anni Bisso | 50 m rifle three positions | 584 | 4 Q | 675.6 | 6 |
| Anni Bisso | 10 m air rifle | 391 | 20 | did not advance | |
| Karen Hansen | 25 m pistol | 572 | 28 | did not advance | |
| Karen Hansen | 10 m air pistol | 376 | 25 | did not advance | |
| Susanne Meyerhoff | 25 m pistol | 562 | 39 | did not advance | |
| Susanne Meyerhoff | 10 m air pistol | 372 | 35 | did not advance | |

== Swimming ==
Men

| Athlete | Event | Heat | | Semifinal | | Final | |
| Athlete | Event | Time | Rank | Time | Rank | Time | Rank |
|---|---|---|---|---|---|---|---|
| Jacob Carstensen | 200 metre freestyle | 1:50.41 | 20 | did not advance | | | |
| Jacob Carstensen | 400 metre freestyle | 03:54.14 | 18 | did not advance | | | |
| Dennis Otzen Jensen | 100 metre butterfly | 55.70 | 42 | did not advance | | | |
| Dennis Otzen Jensen; Henrik Steen Andersen; Jeppe Nielsen; Jacob Carstensen | 4 × 100 m freestyle relay | 03:24.78 | 18 | did not advance | | | |
| Jacob Carstensen; Henrik Steen Andersen; Jeppe Nielsen; Dennis Otzen Jensen | 4 × 200 m freestyle relay | 07:24.63 | 11 | did not advance | | | |

Women

| Athlete | Event | Heat | | Semifinal | | Final | |
| Athlete | Event | Time | Rank | Time | Rank | Time | Rank |
|---|---|---|---|---|---|---|---|
| Mette Jacobsen | 50 metre freestyle | 25.96 | 17 | did not advance | | | |
| Mette Jacobsen | 100 metre butterfly | 59.45 | 8 Q | 59.75 | 13 | did not advance | |
| Mette Jacobsen | 200 metre butterfly | 02:09.30 | 5 Q | 02:08.11 | 5 Q | 02:08.24 | 4 |
| Louise Ørnstedt | 100 metre backstroke | 01:01.98 | 6 Q | 01:01.69 | 7 Q | 01:02.02 | 8 |
| Louise Ørnstedt | 200 metre backstroke | 02:13.61 | 10 Q | 02:14.24 | 12 | did not advance | |
| Sophia Skou | 100 metre butterfly | 59.79 | 14 Q | 59.89 | 15 | did not advance | |
| Sophia Skou | 200 metre butterfly | 02:11.35 | 13 Q | 02:11.07 | 14 | did not advance | |

== Table tennis ==
Doubles

| Athlete | Event | Group round | | Round of 16 | Quarterfinals | Semifinals | Bronze medal | Final | |
| Athlete | Event | Opposition Result | Rank | Opposition Result | Opposition Result | Opposition Result | Opposition Result | Opposition Result | Rank |
|---|---|---|---|---|---|---|---|---|---|
| Michael Maze; Finn Tugwell | Men's doubles | Group F Matsushita / Shibutani (JPN); W 2 – 0 Yinghua / Nguyen (USA); W 2 – 0 | 1 Q | Yen-shu / Peng-lung (TPE); L 0 – 3 | did not advance | | | | |

== Taekwondo ==
Denmark has qualified a single taekwondo jin.

| Athlete | Event | Round of 16 | Quarterfinals | Semifinals | Repechage 1 | Repechage 2 | Final / BM | |
| Athlete | Event | Opposition Result | Opposition Result | Opposition Result | Opposition Result | Opposition Result | Opposition Result | Rank |
|---|---|---|---|---|---|---|---|---|
| Muhammed Dahmani | Men's −80 kg | Hansen (AUS); L 5–6 | did not advance | | | | | |
| Hanne Høgh Poulsen | Women's −49 kg | Poe (USA); W 4–3 | Putri (INA); W 7–2 | Burns (AUS); L 0–1 | —N/a | Pérez (MEX); W 2–1 | Shu-ju (TPE); L 0–4 | 4 |

== Tennis ==
| Athlete | Event | Round of 64 | Round of 32 | Round of 16 | Quarterfinals | Semifinals | Final / BM | |
| Athlete | Event | Opposition Score | Opposition Score | Opposition Score | Opposition Score | Opposition Score | Opposition Score | Rank |
|---|---|---|---|---|---|---|---|---|
| Kristian Pless | Men's singles | Sargsian (ARM); W 6–3, 6–4 | Philippoussis (AUS); L 4–6, 4–6 | did not advance | | | | |

== Triathlon ==
| Athlete | Event | Swim (1.5 km) | Bike (40 km) | Run (10 km) | Total Time | Rank |
|---|---|---|---|---|---|---|
| Jan Knobelauch Hansen | Men's | 19:23.69 | 1:02:48.90 | 33:29.47 | 1:55:42.06 | 44 |
| Marie Overbye | Women's | 20:56.08 | 1:06:41.50 | 39:39.93 | 2:07:17.51 | 28 |
