= Rowing at the 2000 Summer Olympics – Men's lightweight coxless four =

Men's lightweight coxless four at the Games of the XXVII Olympiad
- Venue: Sydney International Regatta Centre
- Date: 18–24 September 2000
- Competitors: 57 from 14 nations
- Winning time: 6:01.68

Medalists
1st place, gold medalist(s)		Laurent Porchier; Jean-Christophe Bette; Yves Hocdé; Xavier Dorfman	France
2nd place, silver medalist(s)		Simon Burgess; Anthony Edwards; Darren Balmforth; Robert Richards	Australia
3rd place, bronze medalist(s)		Søren Madsen; Thomas Ebert; Eskild Ebbesen; Victor Feddersen	Denmark

The men's lightweight coxless four competition at the 2000 Summer Olympics in Sydney, Australia took place at the Sydney International Regatta Centre.

== Competition format ==
This rowing event is a sweep rowing event, meaning that each rower has one oar and rows on only one side. Four rowers crew each boat, and no coxswain is used. As a lightweight rowing event, rowers were limited to a maximum body mass of 72.5 kilograms each and 70 kilograms on average. The competition consisted of multiple rounds. Finals were held to determine the placing of each boat; these finals were given letters with those nearer to the beginning of the alphabet meaning a better ranking. Semifinals were named based on which finals they fed, with each semifinal having two possible finals.

With 14 boats in with heats, the best boats qualify directly for the semi-finals. All other boats progress to the repechage round, which offers a second chance to qualify for the semi-finals. Unsuccessful boats from the repechage are eliminated from the competition. The best three boats in each of the two semi-finals qualify for final A, which determines places 1–6 (including the medals). Unsuccessful boats from semi-finals A/B go forward to final B, which determines places 7–12.

== Schedule ==
All times are Australian Time (UTC+10)

Date	Time	Round
Monday, 18 September 2000	09:40	Heats
Wednesday, 20 September 2000	09:40	Repechages
Friday, 22 September 2000	09:10	Semifinals
Saturday, 23 September 2000	11:30	Final B
Sunday, 24 September 2000	09:10	Final

== Results ==
=== Heats ===
The first three boats of each heat advanced to the semifinals, remainder goes to the repechage.

==== Heat 1 ====
Rank	Rower	Country	Time	Notes
1	Laurent Porchier, Jean-Christophe Bette, Yves Hocdé, Xavier Dorfman	France	6:09.32	A/B
2	Iain Brambell, Chris Davidson, Gavin Hassett, Jon Beare	Canada	6:10.37	A/B
3	Roland Händle, Björn Spaeter, Thorsten Schmidt, Marcus Mielke	Germany	6:16.37	A/B
4	Jorge Morgenstern, Herbert Jans, Christián Yantani, Miguel Cerda	Chile	6:21.10	R
5	Keisuke Murai, Atsushi Obata, Hiroya Sato, Yasunori Tanabe	Japan	6:22.31	R

==== Heat 2 ====
Rank	Rower	Country	Time	Notes
1	Simon Burgess, Anthony Edwards, Darren Balmforth, Robert Richards	Australia	6:11.42	A/B
2	Joris Trooster, Jeroen Spaans, Simon Kolkman, Robert van der Vooren	Netherlands	6:14.37	A/B
3	Helfried Jurtschitsch, Bernd Wakolbinger, Martin Kobau, Wolfgang Sigl	Austria	6:16.94	A/B
4	Dmitry Kartashov, Andrey Shevel, Sergey Bukreyev, Aleksandr Zyuzin	Russia	6:17.01	R
5	Neville Maxwell, Neal Byrne, Gearoid Towey, Anthony O'Connor	Ireland	6:18.94	R

==== Heat 3 ====
Rank	Rower	Country	Time	Notes
1	Salvatore Amitrano, Franco Sancassani, Catello Amarante, Carlo Gaddi	Italy	6:14.89	A/B
2	Marc Schneider, Greg Ruckman, Paul Teti, Tom Auth	United States	6:16.36	A/B
3	Mark Raeside Rowand, Ross Hawkins, Roger Tobler, Mike Hasselbach	South Africa	6:17.88	A/B
4	Søren Madsen, Thomas Ebert, Eskild Ebbesen, Victor Feddersen	Denmark	6:21.30	R

=== Repechage ===
First three qualify to semifinals.

==== Repechage 1 ====
Rank	Rower	Country	Time	Notes
1	Søren Madsen, Thomas Ebert, Eskild Ebbesen, Victor Feddersen	Denmark	6:08.63	A/B
2	Dmitry Kartashov, Andrey Shevel, Sergey Bukreyev, Alexandre Zyuzin	Russia	6:10.35	A/B
3	Neville Maxwell, Neal Byrne, Gearoid Towey, Anthony O'Connor	Ireland	6:13.00	A/B
4	Jorge Morgenstern, Herbert Jans, Christián Yantani, Miguel Cerda	Chile	6:15.49	
5	Keisuke Murai, Atsushi Obata, Hiroya Sato, Yasunori Tanabe	Japan	6:18.56	

=== Semifinals ===
First three places advance to Final A, the remainder to Final B.

==== Semifinal 1 ====
Rank	Rower	Country	Time	Notes
1	Simon Burgess, Anthony Edwards, Darren Balmforth, Robert Richards	Australia	6:00.82	A
2	Laurent Porchier, Jean-Christophe Bette, Yves Hocdé, Xavier Dorfman	France	6:00.85	A
3	Marc Schneider, Greg Ruckman, Paul Teti, Tom Auth	United States	6:05.13	A
4	Helfried Jurtschitsch, Bernd Wakolbinger, Martin Kobau, Wolfgang Sigl	Austria	6:10.11	B
5	Neville Maxwell, Neal Byrne, Gearoid Towey, Anthony O'Connor	Ireland	6:10.30	B
6	Roland Händle, Björn Später, Thorsten Schmidt, Marcus Mielke	Germany	6:15.75	B

==== Semifinal 2 ====
Rank	Rower	Country	Time	Notes
1	Salvatore Amitrano, Franco Sancassani, Catello Amarante, Carlo Gaddi	Italy	6:00.82	A
2	Søren Madsen, Thomas Ebert, Eskild Ebbesen, Victor Feddersen	Denmark	6:01.67	A
3	Mark Raeside Rowand, Ross Hawkins, Roger Tobler, Mike Hasselbach	South Africa	6:02.09	A
4	Iain Brambell, Chris Davidson, Gavin Hassett, Jon Beare	Canada	6:02.49	B
5	Joris Trooster, Jeroen Spaans, Simon Kolkman, Robert van der Vooren	Netherlands	6:03.25	B
6	Dmitry Kartashov, Andrey Shevel, Sergey Bukreyev, Alexandre Zyuzin	Russia	6:15.31	B

=== Finals ===
==== Final B ====
Rank	Rower	Country	Time	Notes
1	Iain Brambell, Chris Davidson, Gavin Hassett, Jon Beare	Canada	6:04.31	
2	Joris Trooster, Jeroen Spaans, Simon Kolkman, Robert van der Vooren	Netherlands	6:05.96	
3	Helfried Jurtschitsch, Bernd Wakolbinger, Martin Kobau, Wolfgang Sigl	Austria	6:10.11	
4	Dmitry Kartashov, Andrey Shevel, Sergey Bukreyev, Alexandre Zyuzin	Russia	6:09.12	
5	Neville Maxwell, Neal Byrne, Gearoid Towey, Anthony O'Connor	Ireland	6:09.84	
6	Roland Händle, Björn Später, Thorsten Schmidt, Marcus Mielke	Germany	6:15.31	

==== Final A ====
Rank	Rower	Country	Time	Notes
1st place, gold medalist(s)	Laurent Porchier, Jean-Christophe Bette, Yves Hocdé, Xavier Dorfman	France	6:01.68	
2nd place, silver medalist(s)	Simon Burgess, Anthony Edwards, Darren Balmforth, Robert Richards	Australia	6:02.09	
3rd place, bronze medalist(s)	Søren Madsen, Thomas Ebert, Eskild Ebbesen, Victor Feddersen	Denmark	6:03.51	
4	Salvatore Amitrano, Franco Sancassani, Catello Amarante, Carlo Gaddi	Italy	6:03.77	
5	Mark Raeside Rowand, Ross Hawkins, Roger Tobler, Mike Hasselbach	South Africa	6:07.67	
6	Marc Schneider, Greg Ruckman, Paul Teti, Tom Auth	United States	6:10.09	
