= Chile at the 2000 Summer Olympics =

- IOC code: CHI
- NOC: Chilean Olympic Committee
- Website: www.coch.cl (in Spanish)

in Sydney
- Competitors: 50 (43 men and 7 women) in 14 sports
- Flag bearer: Nicolás Massú
- Medals Ranked 71st: Gold 0 Silver 0 Bronze 1 Total 1

Summer Olympics appearances (overview)
- 1896; 1900–1908; 1912; 1920; 1924; 1928; 1932; 1936; 1948; 1952; 1956; 1960; 1964; 1968; 1972; 1976; 1980; 1984; 1988; 1992; 1996; 2000; 2004; 2008; 2012; 2016; 2020; 2024

Chile competed at the 2000 Summer Olympics in Sydney, Australia. 50 competitors, 43 men and 7 women, took part in 28 events in 14 sports.

== Medalists ==
Medal	Name	Sport	Event	Date
Bronze	Chile national under-23 football team: Nelson Tapia; Cristián Álvarez; Claudio Maldonado; David Henríquez; Pablo Contreras; Pedro Reyes; Sebastián González; David Pizarro; Iván Zamorano; Francisco Arrué; Reinaldo Navia; Héctor Tapia; Rodrigo Núñez; Rodrigo Tello; Manuel Ibarra; Rafael Olarra; Patricio Ormazábal; Javier di Gregorio; Mauricio Rojas; Andrés Oroz; Milovan Mirosevic; Johnny Herrera	Football	Men's tournament	29 September

== Competitors ==
The following is the list of number of competitors in the Games.

Sport	Men	Women	Total
Archery	0	1	1
Athletics	6	1	7
Cycling	2	0	2
Equestrian	2	0	2
Fencing	0	1	0
Football	17	0	17
Judo	1	0	1
Rowing	5	1	6
Shooting	2	0	2
Swimming	2	0	2
Table tennis	2	3	5
Taekwondo	1	0	1
Tennis	2	0	2
Triathlon	1	0	1
Total	43	7	50

== Archery ==
Chile has qualified one archer for the women's individual event.

Athlete	Event	Ranking round		Round of 64	Round of 32	Round of 16	Quarterfinals	Semifinals	Final / BM	
Athlete	Event	Score	Seed	Opposition Score	Opposition Score	Opposition Score	Opposition Score	Opposition Score	Opposition Score	Rank
Denisse van Lamoen	Women's individual	605	59	Kawauchi (JPN) (6); L 146–151	Did not advance					

== Athletics ==
Chilean athletes have so far achieved qualifying standards in the following athletics events (up to a maximum of 3 athletes in each event at the 'A' Standard, and 1 at the 'B' Standard):

Key

- Note–Ranks given for track events are within the athlete's heat only
- Q = Qualified for the next round
- q = Qualified for the next round as a fastest loser or, in field events, by position without achieving the qualifying target
- NR = National record
- N/A = Round not applicable for the event
- Bye = Athlete not required to compete in round

Men
Track & road events

Athlete	Event	Heat		Semifinal		Final	
Athlete	Event	Result	Rank	Result	Rank	Result	Rank
Ricardo Roach	200 m	21.20	6	Did not advance			
Mauricio Diaz	10000 m	28:05.61 NR	13	Did not advance			
Carlos Zbinden	400 m hurdles	51.36	6	Did not advance			
Juan Pablo Faundez; Ricardo Roach; Rodrigo Roach; Diego Valdés	4 × 100 m relay	40.20	8	Did not advance			

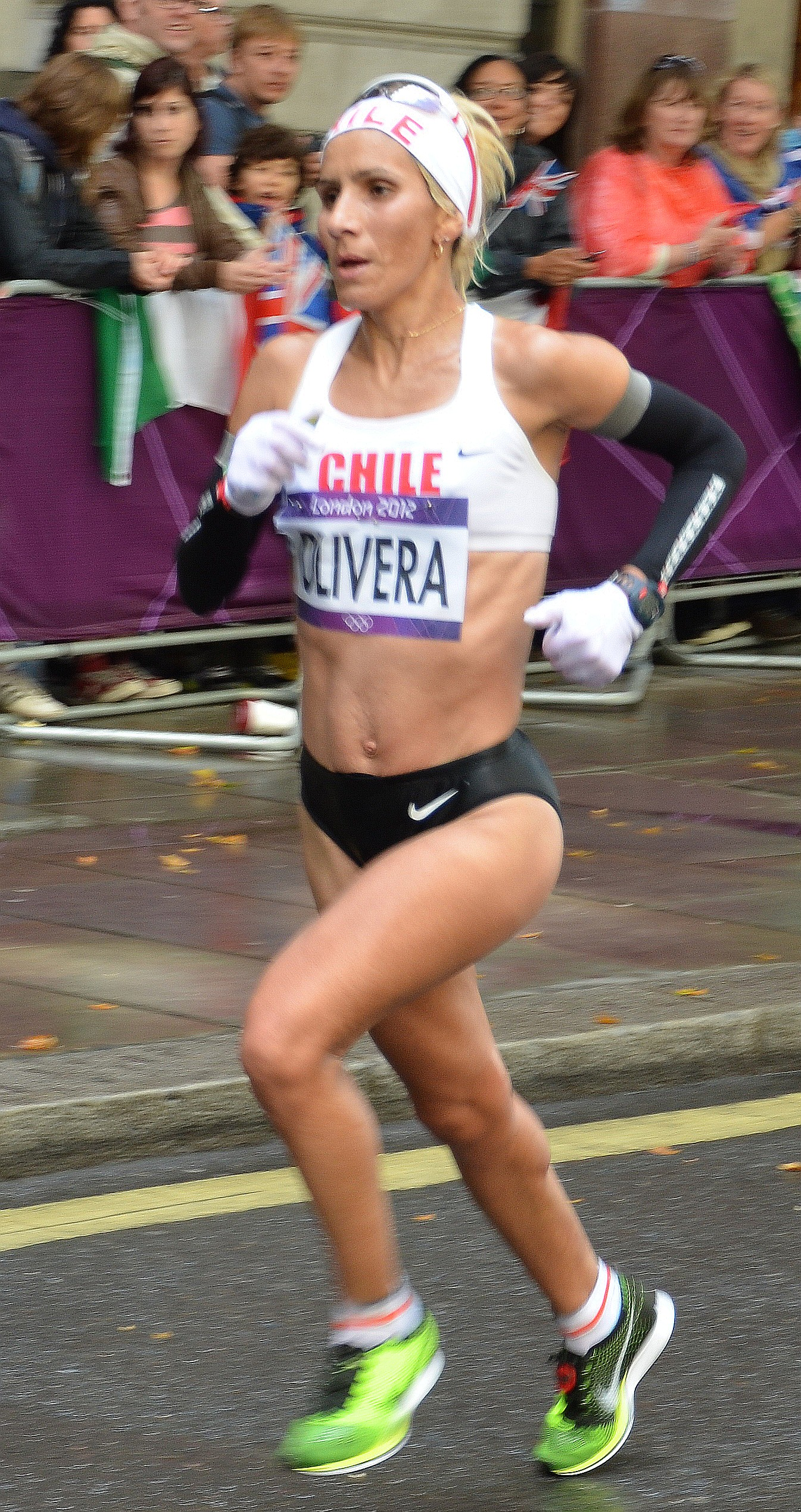
Érika Olivera in women's marathon

Women
Track & road events

Athlete	Event	Final	
Athlete	Event	Result	Rank
Érika Olivera	Marathon	2:35:07	27

== Cycling ==
=== Road ===
Athlete	Event	Time	Rank
José Medina	Men's road race	5:41:62	82
Luis Fernando Sepúlveda	Men's road race		Did not finish

== Equestrian ==
Chile has qualified 2 riders.

=== Jumping ===
Athlete	Horse	Event	Qualification								Final					Total	
Athlete	Horse	Event	Round 1		Round 2			Round 3			Round A		Round B			Total	
Athlete	Horse	Event	Penalties	Rank	Penalties	Total	Rank	Penalties	Total	Rank	Penalties	Rank	Penalties	Total	Rank	Penalties	Rank
Carlos Milthaler	As Schylok	Individual	5.50	=16 Q	16.00	21.50	43 Q	0.00	21.50	23 Q	20.75	42	Did not advance			20.75	43
Joaquín Larraín	Jägermeister	Individual	17.00	54 Q	12.00	29.00	54 Q	89.50	89.50	67 RT	Did not advance					89.00	67

== Fencing ==
Chile has qualified 1 fencer.

Men

Athlete	Event	Round of 32	Round of 16	Quarterfinal	Semifinal	Final / BM	
Athlete	Event	Opposition Score	Opposition Score	Opposition Score	Opposition Score	Opposition Score	Rank
Cáterin Bravo	Individual épée	Vansoviča (LAT); L 5–15	Did not advance				

== Football ==
=== Men's tournament ===
Roster

Group play

Team	Pld	W	D	L	GF	GA	GD	Pts
Chile	3	2	0	1	7	3	+4	6
Spain	3	2	0	1	6	3	+3	6
South Korea	3	2	0	1	2	3	−1	6
Morocco	3	0	0	3	1	7	−6	0

14 September 2000
20:00

Morocco	1–4	Chile
Ouchla 79'	Report	Zamorano 36', 45+1' (pen.), 55'; Navia 72' (pen.)

Melbourne Cricket Ground, Melbourne
Attendance: 22,654
Referee: Saad Mane (Kuwait)

17 September 2000
20:00

Spain	1–3	Chile
Lacruz 54'	Report	Olarra 24'; Navia 41', 90'

Melbourne Cricket Ground, Melbourne
Attendance: 58,061
Referee: Felix Tangawarima (Zimbabwe)

20 September 2000
18:30

South Korea	1–0	Chile
Lee Dong-gook 28'	Report

Hindmarsh Stadium, Adelaide
Attendance: 16,309
Referee: Ľuboš Micheľ (Slovakia)

Quarterfinals

23 September 2000
20:00

Chile	4–1	Nigeria
Contreras 17'; Zamorano 18'; Navia 42'; Tello 65'	Report	Agali 76'

Melbourne Cricket Ground, Melbourne
Attendance: 44,425
Referee: Saad Mane (Kuwait)

Semi-finals

26 September 2000
21:00

Chile	1–2	Cameroon
Abanda 78' (o.g.)	Report	Mboma 84'; Lauren 89' (pen.)

Melbourne Cricket Ground, Melbourne
Attendance: 64,338
Referee: Stéphane Bré (France)

Bronze medal match

29 September 2000
20:00

United States	0–2	Chile
	Report	Zamorano 69' (pen.), 84'

Sydney Football Stadium, Sydney
Attendance: 26,381
Referee: Simon Micallef (Australia)

Final rank

Bronze

== Judo ==
Athlete	Event	Round of 64	Round of 32	Round of 16	Quarterfinals	Semifinals	Repechage	Bronze medal	Final	
Athlete	Event	Opposition Result	Opposition Result	Opposition Result	Opposition Result	Opposition Result	Opposition Result	Opposition Result	Opposition Result	Rank
Gabriel Lama	Men's −90 kg	BYE	Salimov (AZE); L 0011–0011	Did not advance						

== Rowing ==
Men

Athlete	Event	Heats		Quarterfinals		Semifinals		Final	
Athlete	Event	Time	Rank	Time	Rank	Time	Rank	Time	Rank
Félipe Leal	Single sculls	7:39.43	5 R	7:34.56	4 C/D	7:28.78	3 C	7:44.48	17
Jorge Morgenstern; Herbert Jans; Christián Yantani; Miguel Cerda	Lightweight four	6:21.10	4 R	6:15.49	4	Did not advance			13

Women

Athlete	Event	Heats		Quarterfinals		Semifinals		Final	
Athlete	Event	Time	Rank	Time	Rank	Time	Rank	Time	Rank
Soraya Jadué	Single sculls	8:03.52	4 R	8:02.17	3 C/D	8:01.20	1 C	7:53.56	13

Qualification Legend: FA=Final A (medal); FB=Final B (non-medal); FC=Final C (non-medal); FD=Final D (non-medal); FE=Final E (non-medal); FF=Final F (non-medal); SA/B=Semifinals A/B; SC/D=Semifinals C/D; SE/F=Semifinals E/F; QF=Quarterfinals; R=Repechage

== Shooting ==
Men

Athlete	Event	Qualification		Final	
Athlete	Event	Points	Rank	Points	Rank
Christián Muñoz	10 m air pistol	559	40	Did not advance	
Christián Muñoz	50 m pistol	537	36	Did not advance	
Marcelo Yarad	Skeet	122	9	Did not advance	

== Swimming ==
Men

Athlete	Event	Heat		Semifinal		Final	
Athlete	Event	Time	Rank	Time	Rank	Time	Rank
Rodrigo Olivares	50 m freestyle	24.50	55	Did not advance			
Rodrigo Olivares	100 m freestyle	53.50	62	Did not advance			
Giancarlo Zolezzi	400 m freestyle	4:01.51	40	Did not advance			

== Table tennis ==
Women

Athlete	Event	Round robin			1st round	Eighthfinals	Quarterfinals	Semifinals	Final
Athlete	Event	Match 1	Match 2	Match 3	1st round	Eighthfinals	Quarterfinals	Semifinals	Final
Athlete	Event	Opposition Result	Opposition Result	Opposition Result	Opposition Result	Opposition Result	Opposition Result	Opposition Result	Opposition Result
Sofija Tepes	Singles	Jing Junhong (SIN); L 0 – 3	Karen Li (NZL); L 0 – 3	Did not advance					
Berta Rodríguez	Singles	Chunli Li (NZL); L 0 – 3	Rūta Paškauskienė (LTU); L 1 – 3	Did not advance					
Silvia Morel; Sofija Tepes	Doubles	Ai Fujinima; An Konishi (JPN); L 1 – 2	Ah Sim Song; Ching Wong (HKG); L 0 – 2	Did not advance					

Men

Athlete	Event	Round robin			1st round	Eighthfinals	Quarterfinals	Semifinals	Final
Athlete	Event	Match 1	Match 2	Match 3	1st round	Eighthfinals	Quarterfinals	Semifinals	Final
Athlete	Event	Opposition Result	Opposition Result	Opposition Result	Opposition Result	Opposition Result	Opposition Result	Opposition Result	Opposition Result
Augusto Morales	Singles	Yevgeni Shchetinin (BLR); L 0 – 3	Philippe Saive (BEL); L 0 – 3	Did not advance					
Jorge Gambra	Singles	Josef Plachý (CZE); L 0 – 3	Toshio Tasaki (JPN); L 1 – 3	Did not advance					
Augusto Morales; Jorge Gambra	Doubles	Anton Suseno; Ismu Harinto (INA); W 2 – 1	Jean-Michel Saive; Philippe Saive (BEL); L 0 – 2	Seiko Iseki; Toshio Tasaki (JPN); L 0 – 2	Did not advance				

== Taekwondo ==
Athlete	Event	Round of 16	Quarterfinals	Semifinals	Repechage 1	Repechage 2	Final / BM	
Athlete	Event	Opposition Result	Opposition Result	Opposition Result	Opposition Result	Opposition Result	Opposition Result	Rank
Felipe Soto	Men's −80 kg	Matos (CUB); L 2-9	Did not advance		Estrada (MEX); L 1-6	Did not advance		7

== Tennis ==
Athlete	Event	Round of 64	Round of 32	Round of 16	Quarterfinals	Semifinals	Final / BM	
Athlete	Event	Opposition Score	Opposition Score	Opposition Score	Opposition Score	Opposition Score	Opposition Score	Rank
Marcelo Ríos	Men's singles	Zabaleta (ARG); L 7–6^{(10–8)}, 4–6, 5–7	Did not advance					
Nicolas Massú	Men's singles	Doseděl (CZE); W 3–6, 6–0, 6–1	Ferrero (ESP); L 4–6, 6–7^{(8–6)}	Did not advance				
Marcelo Ríos; Nicolas Massú	Men's doubles	—N/a	Lee / Yoon (KOR); L 3–6, 4–6	Did not advance				

== Triathlon ==
Athlete	Event	Swim (1.5 km)	Bike (40 km)	Run (10 km)	Total Time	Rank
Matías Brain	Men's	18:56.59	58:46.30	36:02.01	1:53:44.90	41

== See also ==
- Chile at the 1999 Pan American Games
