= Cristián Álvarez (footballer, born 1980) =

Chilean footballer

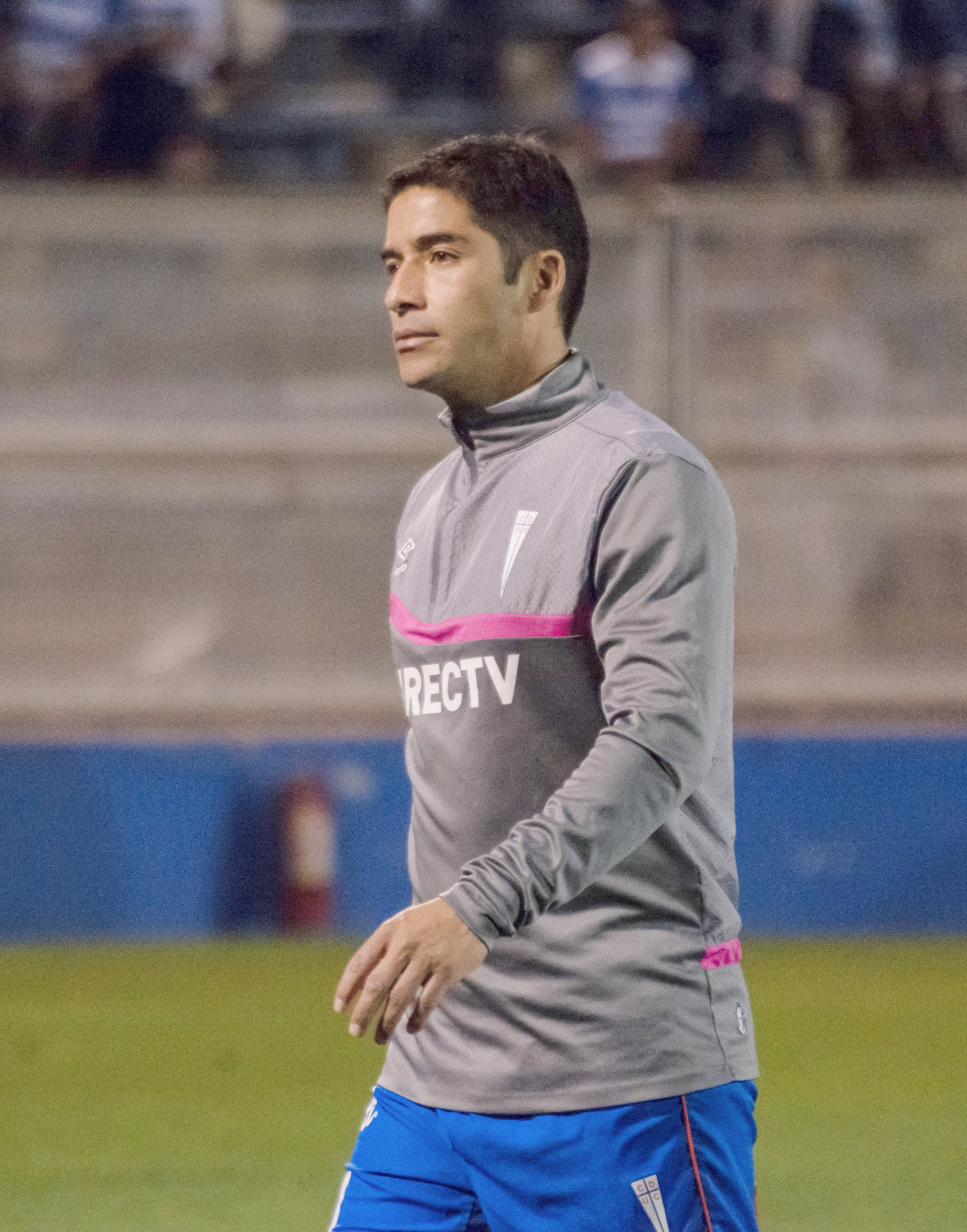
- Álvarez with Universidad Católica 2018

Personal information
- Full name: Cristián Andrés Álvarez Valenzuela
- Date of birth: 20 January 1980 (age 46)
- Place of birth: Curicó, Chile
- Height: 1.76 m (5 ft 9 1/2 in)
- Position: Defender

Team information
- Current team: Universidad Católica (youth manager)

Youth career
- Escuela Municipal Curicó
- 1993–1999: Universidad Católica

Senior career*
Years	Team	Apps	(Gls)
1997–2005	Universidad Católica	173	(24)
2005–2006	River Plate	21	(0)
2007	Universidad Católica	16	(1)
2007–2010	Beitar Jerusalem	54	(5)
2009–2010	→ Chiapas (loan)	20	(0)
2011–2012	Universitario	15	(2)
2011–2018	Universidad Católica	145	(9)
Total		443	(41)

International career
1997	Chile U17	10	(1)
1999	Chile U20	9	(0)
2000	Chile U23	13	(0)
2000–2014	Chile	24	(0)

Managerial career
- 2022–: Universidad Católica (youth)
- * Club domestic league appearances and goals

Cristián Andrés Álvarez Valenzuela (born 20 January 1980) is a Chilean former footballer, who played as a defender.

== Club career ==
=== Universidad Catolica ===
As a child, Álvarez and his twin brother, Iván, played at Escuela de Fútbol Municipal de Curicó (Municipal Football Academy of Curicó), later named Juventud 2000, founded by their father Luis Hernán. He arrived in 1993 to prove to Universidad Católica next to his twin brother Iván, after the pickers of the UC saw him play in a championship in his native Curicó. He spent three years traveling to Santiago to train and play for the Crusaders, it was not until 1996 that he finally moved to live in Santiago.

For 1997 made his debut in the Professional Squad, he played 31 minutes with just 17 years in the 4–0 win against Colo-Colo (in that duel lined up youths due to a footballers' strike).

Arriving 1999 is officially made with an official jersey on the cross team honor planter. He participated in only 10 official matches until the Chilean national championship of the year 2000, where he played 23 matches with 2 converted goals, together with 21 matches played in 2001.

The year 2002 obtained the titularity in the crossed squad, being champion of the Torneo de Apertura, and playing 43 parties with 2 goals. In that same tournament he put his name at the top of the Crusade history. It was a day on 12 October, while playing the 145th edition of the university classic against University of Chile and after an injury of goalkeeper Jonny Walker. The coach Juvenal Olmos did not have more changes, this was how Cristián Álvarez was who offered to get under the 3 sticks. 71 'minutes had passed. When with jersey and gloves provided, Crístián manages to stop the finishing of the blue scorer Pedro González. The match ended 1-1.

From 2003, until his transfer to the Argentine side River Plate in the middle of 2005, he played 78 games and scored 19 goals, despite being a right-back.

=== International career ===
His first match with River Plate was on 7 August 2005 in the 2–0 victory against Tiro Federal. In 2007 moved Alvarez to Beitar Jerusalem. In a match against Maccabi Netanya Alvarez scored a goal from 35 meters which is nominated to be goals of the year. After two years in Israel with Beitar Jerusalem left on 19 August 2009 his club and signed for Chiapas for one season.

=== back to Universidad Catolica ===
In 2011, Álvarez returned to his home club, Universidad Católica, Where he shared the captaincy of the team with his lifelong friend Milovan Mirosevic.

Cristian Was the captain in 2016, historical year of Universidad Catolica, where they achieved the first bicampeonato in the history of the club, in addition to winning the Super Cup against the archrival Universidad de Chile.

In May 2017, Christian renewed for 6 months more with the club, announcing his retirement in the month of December.

In November 2018, Christian play his last game in San Carlos de Apoquindo, saying goodbye to the public that cheered his name

== International career ==
Álvarez and his twin brother, Iván, represented Chile at under-17 level in both the 1997 South American Championship and the 1997 FIFA World Championship. In addition, represented Chile U20 in the 1999 South American Championship in Argentina.

He competed in the 2000 Summer Olympics in Sydney representing Chile and won the bronze medal. Previously, he took part in the 2000 Pre-Olympic Tournament.

His debut with the Chilean senior team was in 2000 against Ecuador during qualifications for the 2002 FIFA World Cup. He has 24 caps for his country.

== Managerial career ==
Álvarez graduated as a Football Manager at the INAF (National Football Institute) in 2017. Since 2018 he has worked for Universidad Católica, mainly as a technical consultant, but in 2022 he assumed as coach of youth levels.

He has also been in charge of a football academy in Curicó affiliated to Universidad Católica, just like another former players such as René Valenzuela, Carlos Verdugo, Luciano Saavedra, Ian Mac-Niven, among others.

Since 2024, Álvarez has been in charge of Club Deportivo USS of the San Sebastián University as sporting director with views to join the Tercera B in 2027.

== Personal life ==
He is nicknamed Huaso, like the traditional countryman of the Central Chile, due to the fact his birthplace is Curicó, a city in the Maule Region.

His father, Luis Hernán, was the top goalscorer of the 1963 Primera División de Chile playing for Colo-Colo, becoming an idol for the club. His twin brother, Iván, is a former footballer and coincided with Cristián at both Universidad Católica and Chile at under-17 level.

== Honours ==
=== Club ===
Universidad Católica

- Primera División de Chile (5): 2002–A, 2005–C, 2016–C, 2016–A, 2018
- Copa Chile (1): 2011
- Supercopa de Chile (1): 2016

Beitar Jerusalem

- Israeli Premier League (2): 2007–08
- Israeli Cup (2): 2008, 2009

=== International ===
- Summer Olympic Games: Bronze Medal in Sydney's 2000 Football Championship
