= Daniel López (footballer, born 1969) =

Chilean footballer

Personal information
- Full name: Daniel Fernando López Rojas
- Date of birth: March 6, 1969 (age 57)
- Place of birth: Ovalle, Chile
- Height: 1.80 m (5 ft 11 in)
- Position: Defender

Youth career
- Coquimbo Unido

Senior career*
Years	Team	Apps	(Gls)
1988–1991	Coquimbo Unido	28	(0)
1992–1997	Universidad Católica	99	(6)
1997	Deportes Antofagasta	10	(0)
1998–2000	Coquimbo Unido	75	(1)
2001–2003	Audax Italiano	33	(4)
Total		254	(11)

International career
1994	Chile	3	(0)
- * Club domestic league appearances and goals

Daniel Fernando López Rojas (born 6 March 1969) is a Chilean former footballer. He played as a defender during his career.

== Club career ==
López was trained at Coquimbo Unido, becoming a historical player.

== International career ==
López made three caps (no goals) for the Chile national side, making his debut with the squad on 22 March 1994.

== Post-retirement ==
López has been in charge of a football academy in La Serena affiliated to Universidad Católica, just like another former players such as René Valenzuela, Carlos Verdugo, Luciano Saavedra, Ian Mac-Niven, among others.
