= Bodini =

Bodini is an Italian surname. Notable people with the surname include:

- Daniele Bodini (born 1945), Italian-American businessman
- Luciano Bodini (born 1954), Italian footballer
- Marco Bruno Bodini (born 1972), Italian sailor
- Renato Bodini (1909–1974), Italian footballer and coach

== See also ==
- Bodin (surname)
