= Jorge Morgenstern =

Jorge Morgenstern may refer to:

- Jorge Morgenstern (footballer) (born 1972), Brazilian footballer
- Jorge Morgenstern (rower) (born 1980), Chilean rower
