= Canoeing at the 2000 Summer Olympics – Men's K-1 1000 metres =

The men's K-1 1000 metres event was an individual kayaking event conducted as part of the Canoeing at the 2000 Summer Olympics program.

== Medalists ==
| Gold | Silver | Bronze |
| Knut Holmann (NOR) | Petar Merkov (BUL) | Tim Brabants (GBR) |

== Results ==
=== Heats ===
The top six finishers from each of the heats and the three fastest finisher advanced directly to the semifinals.

Heat 1 of 4 Date: Tuesday 26 September 2000
| Place | Overall | Athlete | Nation | Time | Qual. |
|---|---|---|---|---|---|
| 1 | 3 | Lutz Liwowski | Germany | 3:36.404 | QS |
| 2 | 10 | Roland Kökény | Hungary | 3:38.066 | QS |
| 3 | 11 | Petar Merkov | Bulgaria | 3:38.234 | QS |
| 4 | 13 | Jacopo Majocchi | Italy | 3:39.176 | QS |
| 5 | 16 | Johan Eriksson | Sweden | 3:40.190 | QS |
| 6 | 18 | Vaidas Mizeras | Lithuania | 3:40.202 | QS |
| 7 | 24 | Anton Ryakhov | Uzbekistan | 3:43.718 | QS |
| 8 | 30 | Roger Caumo | Brazil | 3:52.082 | |

Heat 2 of 4 Date: Tuesday 26 September 2000
| Place | Overall | Athlete | Nation | Time | Qual. |
|---|---|---|---|---|---|
| 1 | 4 | Knut Holmann | Norway | 3:36.565 | QS |
| 2 | 9 | Javier Correa | Argentina | 3:37.849 | QS |
| 3 | 12 | Rastislav Kužel | Slovakia | 3:38.893 | QS |
| 4 | 14 | Vladyslav Tereshchenko | Ukraine | 3:39.517 | QS |
| 5 | 25 | Marian Baban | Romania | 3:45.127 | QS |
| 6 | 27 | Gary Mawer | Ireland | 3:45.787 | QS |
| 7 | 28 | Nam Sung-Ho | South Korea | 3:46.669 | |
| 8 | 31 | Nader Eivazi | Iran | 3:59.767 | |

Heat 3 of 4 Date: Tuesday 26 September 2000
| Place | Overall | Athlete | Nation | Time | Qual. |
|---|---|---|---|---|---|
| 1 | 2 | Torsten Tranum | Denmark | 3:35.841 | QS |
| 2 | 5 | Pierre Lubac | France | 3:36.573 | QS |
| 3 | 7 | Tim Brabants | Great Britain | 3:36.903 | QS |
| 4 | 17 | Clint Robinson | Australia | 3:40.197 | QS |
| 5 | 20 | Vladimir Grushikhin | Armenia | 3:40.623 | QS |
| 6 | 23 | Rafał Głażewski | Poland | 3:43.227 | QS |
| 7 | 26 | Adrian Bachmann | Switzerland | 3:45.705 | QS |
| 8 | 29 | Mihai Apostol | Canada | 3:47.679 | |

Heat 4 of 4 Date: Tuesday 26 September 2000
| Place | Overall | Athlete | Nation | Time | Qual. |
|---|---|---|---|---|---|
| 1 | 1 | Michael Kolganov | Israel | 3:35.487 | QS |
| 2 | 6 | Emilio Merchán | Spain | 3:36.591 | QS |
| 3 | 8 | Bob Maesen | Belgium | 3:37.587 | QS |
| 4 | 15 | Alan van Coller | South Africa | 3:39.573 | QS |
| 5 | 19 | Hain Helde | Estonia | 3:40.407 | QS |
| 6 | 21 | Radek Záruba | Czech Republic | 3:40.731 | QS |
| 7 | 22 | Sergey Sergin | Kazakhstan | 3:42.675 | QS |

Overall Results Heats

Heats Overall Results
| Place | Athlete | Nation | Heat | Place | Time | Qual. |
|---|---|---|---|---|---|---|
| 1 | Michael Kolganov | Israel | 4 | 1 | 3:35.487 | QS |
| 2 | Torsten Tranum | Denmark | 3 | 1 | 3:35.841 | QS |
| 3 | Lutz Liwowski | Germany | 1 | 1 | 3:36.404 | QS |
| 4 | Knut Holmann | Norway | 2 | 1 | 3:36.565 | QS |
| 5 | Pierre Lubac | France | 3 | 2 | 3:36.573 | QS |
| 6 | Emilio Merchán | Spain | 4 | 2 | 3:36.591 | QS |
| 7 | Tim Brabants | Great Britain | 3 | 3 | 3:36.903 | QS |
| 8 | Bob Maesen | Belgium | 4 | 3 | 3:37.587 | QS |
| 9 | Javier Correa | Argentina | 2 | 2 | 3:37.849 | QS |
| 10 | Roland Kökény | Hungary | 1 | 2 | 3:38.066 | QS |
| 11 | Petar Merkov | Bulgaria | 1 | 3 | 3:38.234 | QS |
| 12 | Rastislav Kužel | Slovakia | 2 | 3 | 3:38.893 | QS |
| 13 | Jacopo Majocchi | Italy | 1 | 4 | 3:39.176 | QS |
| 14 | Vladyslav Tereshchenko | Ukraine | 2 | 4 | 3:39.517 | QS |
| 15 | Alan van Coller | South Africa | 4 | 4 | 3:39.573 | QS |
| 16 | Johan Eriksson | Sweden | 1 | 5 | 3:40.190 | QS |
| 17 | Clint Robinson | Australia | 3 | 4 | 3:40.197 | QS |
| 18 | Vaidas Mizeras | Lithuania | 1 | 6 | 3:40.202 | QS |
| 19 | Hain Helde | Estonia | 4 | 5 | 3:40.407 | QS |
| 20 | Vladimir Grushikhin | Armenia | 3 | 5 | 3:40.623 | QS |
| 21 | Radek Záruba | Czech Republic | 4 | 6 | 3:40.731 | QS |
| 22 | Sergey Sergin | Kazakhstan | 4 | 7 | 3:42.675 | QS |
| 23 | Rafał Głażewski | Poland | 3 | 6 | 3:43.227 | QS |
| 24 | Anton Ryakhov | Uzbekistan | 1 | 7 | 3:43.718 | QS |
| 25 | Marian Baban | Romania | 2 | 5 | 3:45.127 | QS |
| 26 | Adrian Bachmann | Switzerland | 3 | 7 | 3:45.705 | QS |
| 27 | Gary Mawer | Ireland | 2 | 6 | 3:45.787 | QS |
| 28 | Nam Sung-Ho | South Korea | 2 | 7 | 3:46.669 | |
| 29 | Mihai Apostol | Canada | 3 | 8 | 3:47.679 | |
| 30 | Roger Caumo | Brazil | 1 | 8 | 3:52.082 | |
| 31 | Nader Eivazi | Iran | 2 | 8 | 3:59.767 | |

=== Semifinals ===
The top three finishers from each of the semi-finals advanced to the final.

Heat 1 of 3 Date: Thursday 28 September 2000
| Place | Overall | Athlete | Nation | Time | Qual. |
|---|---|---|---|---|---|
| 1 | 1 | Knut Holmann | Norway | 3:36.425 | QF |
| 2 | 2 | Tim Brabants | Great Britain | 3:37.205 | QF |
| 3 | 3 | Michael Kolganov | Israel | 3:37.439 | QF |
| 4 | 9 | Roland Kökény | Hungary | 3:39.455 | |
| 5 | 11 | Clint Robinson | Australia | 3:40.745 | |
| 6 | 14 | Vaidas Mizeras | Lithuania | 3:41.969 | |
| 7 | 18 | Hain Helde | Estonia | 3:43.499 | |
| 8 | 25 | Sergey Sergin | Kazakhstan | 3:47.633 | |
| 9 | 26 | Gary Mawer | Ireland | 3:50.363 | |

Heat 2 of 3 Date: Thursday 28 September 2000
| Place | Overall | Athlete | Nation | Time | Qual. |
|---|---|---|---|---|---|
| 1 | 6 | Petar Merkov | Bulgaria | 3:38.217 | QF |
| 2 | 7 | Torsten Tranum | Denmark | 3:38.865 | QF |
| 3 | 10 | Emilio Merchán | Spain | 3:40.263 | QF |
| 4 | 13 | Alan van Coller | South Africa | 3:41.727 | |
| 5 | 16 | Rastislav Kužel | Slovakia | 3:43.203 | |
| 6 | 17 | Johan Eriksson | Sweden | 3:43.359 | |
| 7 | 19 | Anton Ryakhov | Uzbekistan | 3:44.109 | |
| 8 | 21 | Rafał Głażewski | Poland | 3:46.761 | |
| 9 | 22 | Vladyslav Tereshchenko | Ukraine | 3:46.833 | |

Heat 3 of 3 Date: Thursday 28 September 2000
| Place | Overall | Athlete | Nation | Time | Qual. |
|---|---|---|---|---|---|
| 1 | 4 | Javier Correa | Argentina | 3:37.975 | QF |
| 2 | 5 | Pierre Lubac | France | 3:38.155 | QF |
| 3 | 8 | Jacopo Majocchi | Italy | 3:39.157 | QF |
| 4 | 12 | Vladimir Grushikhin | Armenia | 3:41.143 | |
| 5 | 15 | Bob Maesen | Belgium | 3:43.147 | |
| 6 | 20 | Radek Záruba | Czech Republic | 3:44.347 | |
| 7 | 23 | Marian Baban | Romania | 3:47.215 | |
| 8 | 24 | Adrian Bachmann | Switzerland | 3:47.479 | |
| | | Lutz Liwowski | Germany | DISQ | |

Overall Results Semi-Finals

Semi-Finals Overall Results
| Place | Athlete | Nation | Heat | Place | Time | Qual. |
|---|---|---|---|---|---|---|
| 1 | Knut Holmann | Norway | 1 | 1 | 3:36.425 | QF |
| 2 | Tim Brabants | Great Britain | 1 | 2 | 3:37.425 | QF |
| 3 | Michael Kolganov | Israel | 1 | 3 | 3:37.439 | QF |
| 4 | Javier Correa | Argentina | 3 | 1 | 3:37.975 | QF |
| 5 | Pierre Lubac | France | 3 | 2 | 3:38.155 | QF |
| 6 | Petar Merkov | Bulgaria | 2 | 1 | 3:38.217 | QF |
| 7 | Torsten Tranum | Denmark | 2 | 2 | 3:38.865 | QF |
| 8 | Jacopo Majocchi | Italy | 3 | 3 | 3:39.157 | QF |
| 9 | Roland Kökény | Hungary | 1 | 4 | 3:39.455 | |
| 10 | Emilio Merchán | Spain | 2 | 3 | 3:40.263 | QF |
| 11 | Clint Robinson | Australia | 1 | 5 | 3:40.745 | |
| 12 | Vladimir Grushikhin | Armenia | 3 | 4 | 3:41.143 | |
| 13 | Alan van Coller | South Africa | 2 | 4 | 3:41.727 | |
| 14 | Vaidas Mizeras | Lithuania | 1 | 6 | 3:41.969 | |
| 15 | Bob Maesen | Belgium | 3 | 5 | 3:43.147 | |
| 16 | Rastislav Kužel | Slovakia | 3 | 5 | 3:43.203 | |
| 17 | Johan Eriksson | Sweden | 2 | 6 | 3:43.359 | |
| 18 | Hain Helde | Estonia | 1 | 7 | 3:43.499 | |
| 19 | Anton Ryakhov | Uzbekistan | 2 | 7 | 3:44.109 | |
| 20 | Radek Záruba | Czech Republic | 3 | 6 | 3:44.347 | |
| 21 | Rafał Głażewski | Poland | 2 | 8 | 3:46.761 | |
| 22 | Vladyslav Tereshchenko | Ukraine | 2 | 9 | 3:46.833 | |
| 23 | Marian Baban | Romania | 3 | 7 | 3:47.215 | |
| 24 | Adrian Bachmann | Switzerland | 1 | 8 | 3:47.479 | |
| 25 | Sergey Sergin | Kazakhstan | 1 | 8 | 3:47.633 | |
| 26 | Gary Mawer | Ireland | 1 | 9 | 3:50.363 | |
| 27 | Lutz Liwowski | Germany | 3 | | DISQ | |

Liwowski's disqualification was not disclosed in the official report.

=== Final ===
Final Date: Saturday 30 September 2000
| Place | Athlete | Nation | Time |
|---|---|---|---|
| 1st place, gold medalist(s) | Knut Holmann | Norway | 3:33.269 |
| 2nd place, silver medalist(s) | Petar Merkov | Bulgaria | 3:34.649 |
| 3rd place, bronze medalist(s) | Tim Brabants | Great Britain | 3:35.057 |
| 4 | Michael Kolganov | Israel | 3:35.099 |
| 5 | Javier Correa | Argentina | 3:35.687 |
| 6 | Torsten Tranum | Denmark | 3:37.811 |
| 7 | Pierre Lubac | France | 3:37.931 |
| 8 | Jacopo Majochi | Italy | 3:38.105 |
| 9 | Emilio Merchán | Spain | 3:39.965 |

Holmann took the lead at 350 meters, then held off a late challenge from Merkov. The Bulgarian refused to attend the post-race press conference over media allegations he had failed a doping test in his home country.
