= Sailing at the 2000 Summer Olympics – Tornado =

Sailing at the Olympics

Open Multihull at the Games of the XXVII Olympiad
- Tornado (sailboat)
- Venue: Sydney
- Dates: First race: 17 September 2000; Last race: 24 September 2000
- Competitors: 32 from 16 nations
- Teams: 16

Medalists
1st place, gold medalist(s)		Roman Hagara; Hans Peter Steinacher	Austria
2nd place, silver medalist(s)		Darren Bundock; John Forbes	Australia
3rd place, bronze medalist(s)		Roland Gaebler; Rene Schwall	Germany

The Open Tornado at the 2000 Summer Olympics was held from 17 to 24 September 2000 in Sydney in Australia. Points were awarded for placement in each race. Eleven races were scheduled and sailed. Each sailor had two discards.

== Results ==
Results of individual races
Position	Nation	Name	Role	1	2	3	4	5	6	7	8	9	10	11	Total	Net
Gold medal	Austria	Roman Hagara & Hans Peter Steinacher	Helm; Crew	3	1	2	1	1	4	1	1	2	DNC (-17)	DNC (-17)	50	16
Silver medal	Australia	Darren Bundock & John Forbes	Helm; Crew	1	3	4	4	4	-7	2	4	-5	2	1	37	25
Bronze medal	Germany	Roland Gaebler & Rene Schwall	Helm; Crew	-10	4	8	5	3	-11	7	2	1	1	7	59	38
4	France	Pierre Pennec & Yann Guichard	Helm; Crew	4	8	-13	2	5	3	3	-9	4	6	8	65	43
5	New Zealand	Chris Dickson & Glen Sowry	Helm; Crew	5	2	7	-15	10	1	5	7	-12	3	6	73	46
6	Great Britain	Hugh Styles & Adam May	Helm; Crew	2	5	3	10	7	6	OCS (-17)	DSQ (-17)	10	7	3	87	53
7	United States	John Lovell & Charlie Ogletree	Helm; Crew	8	6	5	8	2	10	-11	11	3	DSQ (-17)	4	85	57
8	Puerto Rico	Enrique Figueroa & Pedro Colón	Helm; Crew	-11	11	1	7	9	2	4	8	-13	11	5	82	58
9	Spain	Fernando Leon & Jose Luis Ballester	Helm; Crew	7	9	9	-14	6	-12	9	3	9	4	2	84	58
10	Argentina	Santiago Lange & Mariano Parada	Helm; Crew	6	13	10	3	8	5	6	OCS (-17)	-15	14	10	107	75
11	Brazil	Mauricio Oliveira & Henrique Pellicano	Helm; Crew	OCS (-17)	7	6	9	16	13	OCS (-17)	5	6	5	11	112	78
12	Sweden	Martin Strandberg & Magnus Lovden	Helm; Crew	9	10	12	11	-13	8	OCS (-17)	10	8	8	12	118	88
13	Denmark	Stig Raagaard Hansen & Helene Hansen	Helm; Crew	14	15	-16	6	11	9	10	12	7	12	OCS (-17)	129	96
14	Italy	Lorenzo Giacomo Bodini & Marco Bruno Bodini	Helm; Crew	OCS (-17)	12	11	12	12	15	OCS (-17)	6	11	10	9	132	98
15	Russia	Konstantin Yemelyanov & Aleksandr Yanin	Helm; Crew	12	OCS (-17)	14	-16	14	14	8	13	16	13	14	151	118
16	Portugal	Hugo Rocha & Nuno Barreto	Helm; Crew	13	14	15	13	15	16	OCS (-17)	OCS (-17)	14	9	13	156	122

== Notes ==
Points are assigned based on the finishing position in each race (1 for first, 2 for second, etc.). The points are totalled from the top 10 results of the 11 races, with lower totals being better. If a sailor was disqualified or did not complete the race, 26 points are assigned for that race (as there were 25 sailors in this competition).

Scoring abbreviations are defined as follows:

- OCS – On course side of the starting line
- DSQ – Disqualified
- DNF – Did Not Finish
- DNS – Did Not Start
- RDG – Redress Given

== Sources ==
Results and weather take from https://web.archive.org/web/20050825083600/http://www.sailing.org/olympics2000/info2000/
