= Yanin =

Yanin is a surname of Slavic origin. Notable people with the surname include:

- Aleksandr Yanin (born 1967), Russian sailor
- Oleksii Yanin (died 2022), Ukrainian athlete and soldier
- Sergey Yanin (born 1953), Russian ski jumper
- Valentin Yanin (1929–2020), Russian historian
