= Henrik Steen Andersen =

Danish swimmer

Personal information
- Full name: Henrik Steen Andersen
- National team: Denmark
- Born: 6 April 1977 (age 49) Taastrup, Denmark
- Height: 1.93 m (6 ft 4 in)
- Weight: 95 kg (209 lb)

Sport
- Sport: Swimming
- Strokes: Freestyle
- Club: Taastrup IK

Henrik Steen Andersen (born 6 April 1977) is a Danish former swimmer, who specialized in sprint and middle-distance freestyle events. He represented Denmark at the 2000 Summer Olympics, and also trained for the swim team at Taastrup Sport Club (Danish: Taastrup Idræts Klub).

Andersen competed for Denmark in two swimming events at the 2000 Summer Olympics in Sydney. On the first day of the Games, he teamed up with Dennis Otzen Jensen, Jeppe Nielsen, and Jacob Carstensen in the 4×100 m freestyle relay. Swimming the second leg in heat three, Andersen recorded a split of 51.45, but the Danes managed to pull off a seventh-place effort and eighteenth overall in a final time of 3:24.78. Three days later, Andersen, along with Jensen, Nielsen, and Carstensen, placed eleventh 4×200 m freestyle relay with a time of 7:24.63. During the prelims race in heat two, he came up with a spectacular swim on the second exchange and recorded a split of 1:51.51.
