= Luis Hernán Álvarez =

Chilean footballer (1938–1991)

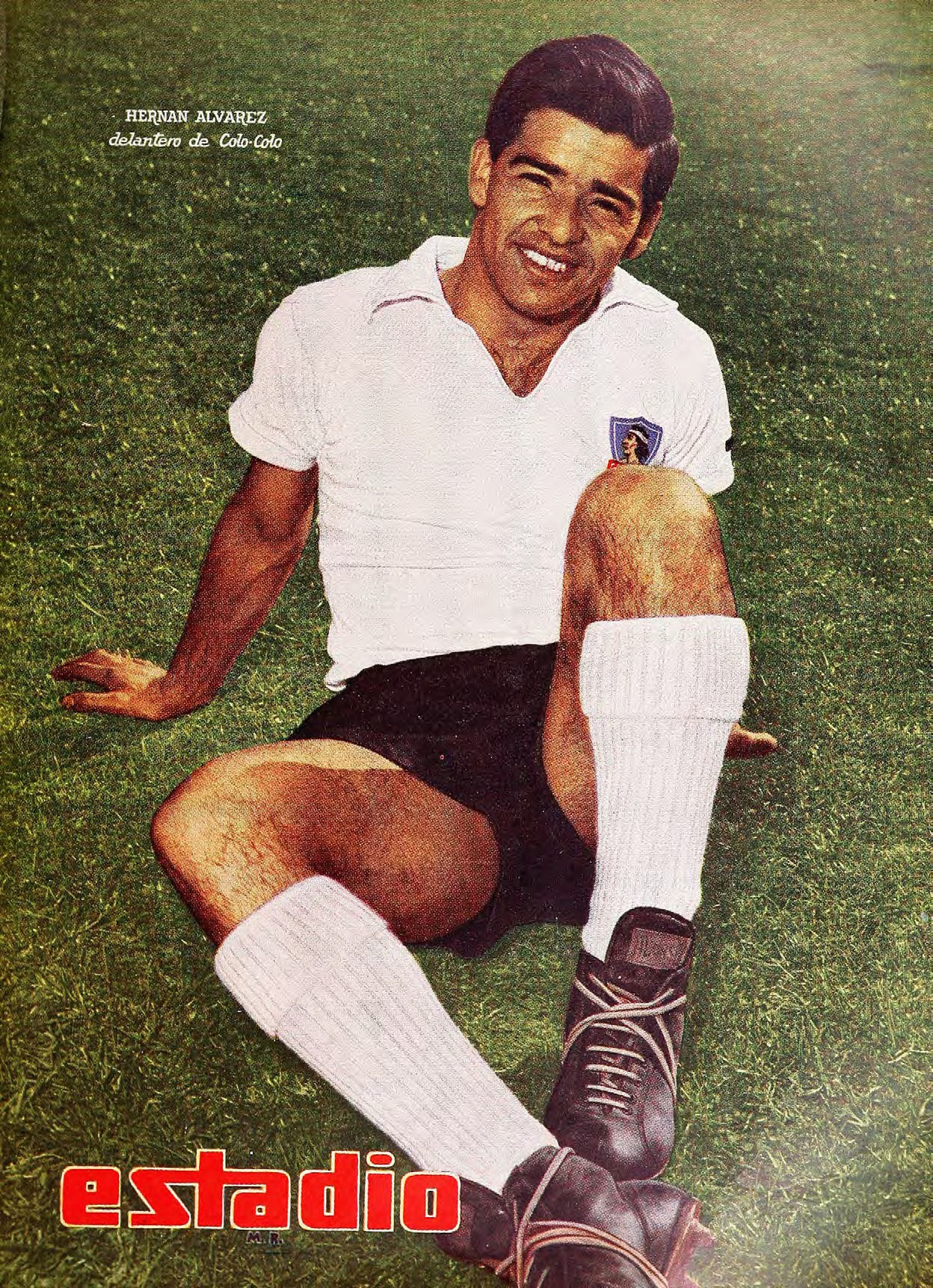

Personal information
- Full name: Luis Hernán Álvarez Hernández
- Date of birth: 21 May 1938
- Place of birth: Curicó, Chile
- Date of death: 23 January 1991 (aged 52)
- Place of death: Curicó, Chile
- Position: Forward

Senior career*
| Years | Team | Apps | (Gls) |
| 1958–1965 | Colo-Colo | | |
| 1966 | Magallanes | | |
| 1967 | Alianza | | |
| 1968 | Green Cross Temuco | | |
| 1969 | Antofagasta Portuario | | |

International career
| 1959–1963 | Chile | 4 | (1) |

Managerial career
- 1978: Curicó Unido
- 1979: Curicó Unido
- 1981: Curicó Unido
- 1988–1991: Escuela Municipal Curicó
- * Club domestic league appearances and goals

Luis Hernán Álvarez Hernández (21 May 1938 – 23 January 1991) was a Chilean footballer who played in clubs in Chile and El Salvador.

== Teams ==
- Colo-Colo 1958–1965
- Magallanes 1966
- Alianza 1967
- Green Cross Temuco 1968
- Antofagasta Portuario 1969

== Personal life ==
He was born and died in Curicó, Chile.

He was the father of the twin brothers Cristián and Iván, who were professional footballers and coincided at both Chile U17 and Universidad Católica.

== Post-retirement ==
Álvarez worked as the manager of Curicó Unido in three seasons: 1978, 1979 and 1981.

Late 1980s, he founded the Escuela Municipal de Fútbol de Curicó (Municipal Football Academy of Curicó), later named Juventud 2000 (Youth 2000), a football academy what has been the breeding ground of successful footballers such as his sons Cristián and Iván, Claudio Maldonado and Patricio Ormazábal. He worked as coach of the Academy until his death in 1991.

The ANFA Stadium in Curicó was given the name of Luis Hernán Álvarez in his honor.

== Titles ==
Colo Colo

- Chilean Primera División (2): 1960, 1963
- Copa Chile (1): 1958

Alianza

- Salvadoran Primera División (1): 1966–67

== Honours ==
- Chilean Primera División Top Goalscorer: 1963
