= Jeroen Spaans =

Dutch rower

Personal information
- Nationality: Dutch
- Born: 17 August 1973 (age 51); Enschede, Netherlands

Sport
- Sport: Rowing

Jeroen Spaans (born 17 August 1973) is a Dutch rower. He competed in the men's lightweight coxless four event at the 2000 Summer Olympics.
