= Neal Byrne =

Irish rower

Personal information
- Nationality: Irish
- Born: 15 June 1976 (age 49); Dublin, Ireland

Sport
- Sport: Rowing

Neal Byrne (born 15 June 1976) is an Irish rower. He competed in the men's lightweight coxless four event at the 2000 Summer Olympics.
