= Björn Spaeter =

German rower (born 1974)

Personal information
- Nationality: German
- Born: 4 September 1974 (age 50); Radolfzell, West Germany

Sport
- Sport: Rowing

Björn Spaeter (born 4 September 1974) is a German former rower. He competed in the men's lightweight coxless four event at the 2000 Summer Olympics.
