= Laurent Porchier =

French rower

Medal record

Men's rowing

Representing France

Olympic Games
Gold medal – first place	2000 Sydney	Lwt coxless four

Laurent Porchier (born 27 June 1968 in Bourg-de-Péage) is a French competition rower and Olympic champion.

Porchier won a gold medal in the lightweight coxless four at the 2000 Summer Olympics.
