= Yves Hocdé =

French rower

Personal information
- Born: 29 April 1973 (age 53) Nantes, France
- Height: 181 cm (5 ft 11 in)
- Weight: 70 kg (154 lb)

Sport
- Sport: Rowing
- Club: CA Nantes
Medal record
Men's rowing
Representing France
Olympic Games
Gold medal – first place	2000 Sydney	Lwt coxless four
World Rowing Championships
Gold medal – first place	2001 Lucerne	Lwt eight

Yves Hocdé (born 29 April 1973 in Nantes) is a French competition rower, world champion and Olympic champion.

Hocdé won a gold medal in the lightweight coxless four event at the 2000 Summer Olympics. He was world champion in this event in 2001.
