= Pedro Colón (sailor) =

Puerto Rican sailor

Personal information
- Full name: Pedro E. Colón Hernández
- Nationality: Puerto Rican
- Born: 7 October 1965 (age 60) Río Piedras, Puerto Rico

Sport
- Sport: Sailing

Pedro E. Colón Hernández (Note: In this Spanish name, the first or paternal surname is Colón and the second or maternal family name is Hernández.) (born 7 October 1965) is a Puerto Rican sailor. He competed in the Tornado event at the 2000 Summer Olympics.
