= Ross Hawkins =

South African rower

Personal information
- Nationality: South African
- Born: 28 December 1973 (age 51); Germiston, South Africa

Sport
- Sport: Rowing

Ross Hawkins (born 28 December 1973) is a South African rower. He competed in the men's lightweight coxless four event at the 2000 Summer Olympics.
