= Jacopo Majocchi =

Italian canoeist (born 1976)

Jacopo Majochi (born August 28, 1976) is an Italian sprint canoer who competed in the early 2000s. He finished eighth in the K-1 1000 m event at the 2000 Summer Olympics in Sydney.
