= Glen Sowry =

New Zealand sailor

Personal information
- Nationality: New Zealand
- Born: 21 July 1962 (age 63); Lower Hutt, New Zealand

Sport
- Sport: Sailing

Glen Sowry (born 21 July 1962) is a New Zealand sailor. He competed in the Tornado event at the 2000 Summer Olympics.
