= Martin Strandberg =

Swedish sailor

Martin Roland Strandberg (born 2 February 1975) is a Swedish Olympic sailor. He finished 12th in the Tornado event at the 2000 Summer Olympics together with Magnus Lövdén and 14th in the Tornado event at the 2004 Summer Olympics together with Kristian Mattsson.
