= Jadir Morgenstern =

Footballer and coach (born 1974)

Jadir
Personal information
- Date of birth: 29 May 1974 (age 52)
- Place of birth: Guarujá, São Paulo, Brazil
- Height: 1.85 m (6 ft 1 in)
- Position: Centre-back

Team information
- Current team: Toledo U19 (manager)

Senior career*
Years	Team	Apps	(Gls)
1991–1993	Toledo		
1993–1999	Clube Atlético Paranaense		
1995	→ Toledo (loan)		
1996	→ Mixto (loan)		
1997	→ Brasil de Farroupilha (loan)		
1998	→ Rio Branco-PR (loan)		
1998	→ Tubarão (loan)		
1999	→ Iraty (loan)		
2000–2002	Ansar		
2002	Juventude-MT		
2002–2005	Sagesse		
2005–2006	Akhaa Ahli Aley		
2006–2007	Ansar		

International career
2000–2001	Lebanon	17	(2)

Managerial career
- 2014–: Toledo U19
- * Club domestic league appearances and goals

Jadir Morgenstern (born 29 May 1974), or simply Jadir (Arabic: جادير), is a football manager and former player who is the manager of Brazilian club Toledo U19. Born in Brazil, he played as a centre-back for the Lebanon national team at the 2000 AFC Asian Cup.

== Club career ==
Jadir started his professional career at Toledo, being sold to Atlético Paranaense for the 1993 Campeonato Brasileiro Série A in which his team was relegated. After spending another year at Furacão, he spent the next years being loaned to lower clubs. In 1996, he won the Campeonato Mato-Grossense with Mixto, playing in the final. In 1998, playing for Tubarão, he won the Copa Santa Catarina.

In 2000, he moved to Lebanese club Al-Ansar, later being naturalized and making his debut for Lebanon later in the year. He spent the rest of his career at the Asian country, except for a brief spell at Juventude-MT, playing also for Hekmeh FC and Akhaa Ahli Aley before ending his career at Al-Ansar.

== International career ==
Jadir represented Lebanon at the 2000 AFC Asian Cup and the World Cup 2002 Qualifying.

== Managerial career ==
Jadir coaches the Toledo under-19 team, a position he holds since 2014.

== Personal life ==
Born in Brazil, Jadir is of Lebanese descent. Jadir's brother, Jorge, was also a professional footballer having played most for Paraná-based clubs. Jadir has a son, Adriel, who also plays football.

== See also ==
- List of Lebanon international footballers born outside Lebanon
- List of association football families
