= Lorenzo Giacomo Bodini =

Italian sailor

Personal information
- Nationality: Italian
- Born: 24 October 1972 (age 52); Trieste, Italy

Sport
- Sport: Sailing

Lorenzo Giacomo Bodini (born 24 October 1972) is an Italian sailor. He competed in the Tornado event at the 2000 Summer Olympics.
