= Darren Balmforth =

Australian rower

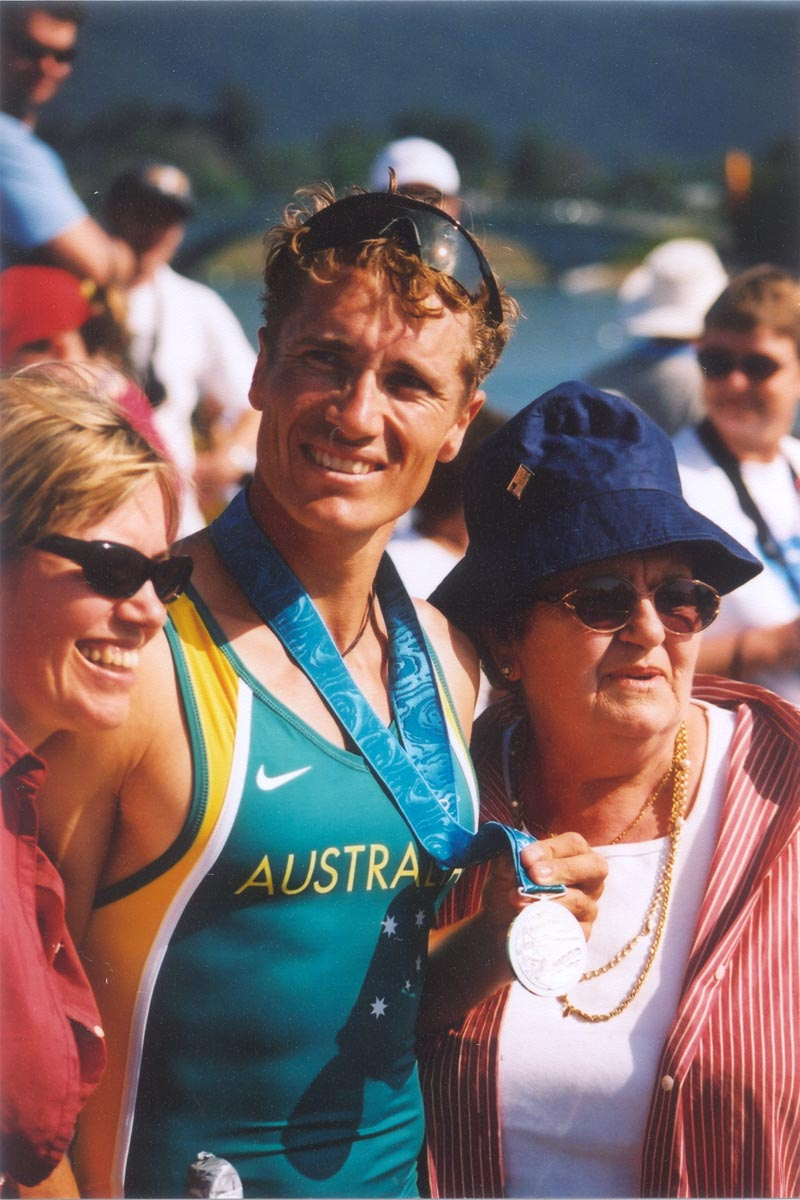

Personal information
- Full name: Darren Bruce Balmforth
- Born: 16 October 1972 (age 53) Hobart, Australia

Sport
- Club: Lindisfarne Rowing Club
Medal record
Men's rowing
Representing Australia
Olympic Games
Silver medal – second place	2000 Sydney	LM4-
World Championships
Gold medal – first place	1997 Aiguebelette	LM8+
Silver medal – second place	1999 St. Catharines	LM4-
Bronze medal – third place	1998 Cologne	LM4-

Darren Bruce Balmforth (born 16 October 1972 in Hobart) is an Australian former lightweight rower. He was a twelve-time Australian national champion, a world champion and an Olympic silver medallist.

== Club and state rowing ==
Balmforth commenced his rowing as a coxswain at Rose Bay High School in Hobart. His senior rowing was from the Lindisfarne Rowing Club in Hobart. He won a Tasmanian Institute of Sport Scholarship from 1993 to 2003 and was named as the Tasmanian Institute of Sport's Athlete of the Year in 1999 and 2000.

Balmforth rowed in Tasmanian representative men's lightweight fours contesting the Penrith Cup at the Interstate Regatta within the Australian Rowing Championships in 1994 and from 1998 to 2002. His Tasmanian crews were victorious in 1999, 2000, 2001 and 2002.

== International representative rowing ==
Balmforth first represented Australia in the lightweight double scull at the 1994 World Rowing U23 Championships in Paris. He placed second. That same year he was selected in the Australian senior lightweight squad and seated at three in the lightweight eight who raced at the 1994 World Rowing Championships in Indianapolis. That crew finished in tenth place.

It was 1997 before he was again seated in the eight at a World Championship. At Aiguebelette 1997 the Australians won a thrilling final by 0.03 seconds with only 1.5 lengths separating the field. Balmforth won his first and only World Championship title. For Cologne 1998 and then at St Catharine's 1999 Balmforth rowed in the Australian coxless four with Anthony Edwards, Bob Richards and the Tasmanian champion Simon Burgess. That four took bronze in 1998 and silver in 1999.

That same lightweight coxless four stayed together for the Sydney 2000 Olympics. The event showcased two match races between the Australians and the French crew. They met in a semi-final where the Australians (with Burgess in the three seat) pipped the French by 3/100ths of a second. In the final the Australians led for much of the race. The French tried once to break through and failed, then a second time and failed and finally with a matter of metres to go broke through to win by less than half a second. Both races were a superb highlight of the regatta and won Balmforth Olympic silver in his last Australian representative appearance.

== Accolades ==
On 16 January 2001, Balmforth was awarded the Australian Sports Medal for services to Olympic Sport and Rowing. In 2010 he was inducted to the Tasmanian Sporting Hall of Fame.
