= Johan Eriksson (canoeist) =

Swedish canoeist (born 1978)

Johann Eriksson (born March 10, 1978) is a Swedish sprint canoer who competed in the early 2000s. He was eliminated in the semifinals of the K-1 1000 m event at the 2000 Summer Olympics in Sydney.
