= Kristian Mattsson =

Swedish sailor

Jens Kristian Malmsjö, born Mattsson (born 19 November 1975) is a Swedish Olympic sailor. He finished 14th in the Tornado event at the 2004 Summer Olympics together with Martin Strandberg.
