= Chris Davidson (rower) =

Canadian rower (born 1971)

Personal information
- Born: 24 October 1971 (age 54) Toronto, Ontario, Canada

Sport
- Sport: Rowing
Medal record
Representing Canada
Pan American Games
Silver medal – second place	1995 Mar del Plata	Lightweight coxless fours
Silver medal – second place	2003 Santo Domingo	Lightweight coxless fours
Silver medal – second place	2003 Santo Domingo	Eights
Summer Universiade
Bronze medal – third place	1993 Buffalo	Lightweight coxless fours

Chris Davidson (born 24 October 1971) is a Canadian rower. He competed in the men's lightweight coxless four event at the 2000 Summer Olympics.
