= Roland Händle =

German rower

Personal information
- Nationality: German
- Born: 11 October 1967 (age 57); Marburg, West Germany

Sport
- Sport: Rowing

Roland Händle (born 11 October 1967) is a German former rower. He competed in the men's lightweight coxless four event at the 2000 Summer Olympics.
