= Helfried Jurtschitsch =

Austrian rower

Personal information
- Nationality: Austrian
- Born: 17 July 1971 (age 54) Sankt Pölten, Austria

Sport
- Sport: Rowing

Helfried Jurtschitsch (born 17 July 1971) is an Austrian rower. He competed in the men's lightweight coxless four event at the 2000 Summer Olympics.
