= Joris Trooster =

Dutch rower

Personal information
- Nationality: Dutch
- Born: 18 December 1969 (age 55); Utrecht, Netherlands

Sport
- Sport: Rowing

Joris Trooster (born 18 December 1969) is a Dutch rower. He competed in the men's lightweight coxless four event at the 2000 Summer Olympics.
