= Thorsten Schmidt =

German rower

Personal information
- Nationality: German
- Born: 14 October 1978 (age 46); Bonn, West Germany

Sport
- Sport: Rowing

Thorsten Schmidt (born 14 October 1978) is a German rower. He competed in the men's lightweight coxless four event at the 2000 Summer Olympics.
