= Robert van der Vooren =

Dutch rower

Personal information
- Nationality: Dutch
- Born: 16 June 1974 (age 50); Utrecht, Netherlands

Sport
- Sport: Rowing

Robert van der Vooren (born 16 June 1974) is a Dutch rower. He competed in the men's lightweight coxless four event at the 2000 Summer Olympics.
