= Jean-Christophe Bette =

French rower (born 1977)

Medal record

Men's rowing

Representing France

Olympic Games
Gold medal – first place	2000 Sydney	Lwt coxless four

World Championships
Gold medal – first place	1998 Cologne	Lwt coxless pair
Gold medal – first place	2001 Lucerne	Lwt eight
Gold medal – first place	2005 Gifu	Lwt coxless four
Gold medal – first place	2009 Poznan	Lwt coxless pair
Gold medal – first place	2010 Karapiro	Lwt coxless pair
Silver medal – second place	2006 Eton	Lwt coxless four
Silver medal – second place	2007 Munich	Lwt coxless four
Bronze medal – third place	2001 Lucerne	Lwt coxless four
Bronze medal – third place	2012 Plovdiv	Lwt coxless pair

European Championships
Gold medal – first place	2009 Brest	Lwt coxless four

Jean-Christophe Bette (born 3 December 1977 in Saint-Germain-en-Laye) is a French competition rower and Olympic champion.

Bette won a gold medal in lightweight coxless four at the 2000 Summer Olympics.
