= Robert Richards (Australian rower) =

Australian rower

Personal information
- Born: 22 September 1971 (age 54) Ballarat, Victoria

Sport
- Club: Wendouree-Ballarat Rowing Club
Medal record
Men's rowing
Representing Australia
Olympic Games
Silver medal – second place	2000 Sydney	Lightweight coxless four
World Rowing Championships
Gold medal – first place	1997 Aiguebelette	LM8+
Silver medal – second place	1999 St. Catharines	LM4-
Bronze medal – third place	1998 Cologne	LM4-

Robert Richards (born 22 September 1971 in Ballarat, Victoria) is an Australian former lightweight rower. He is a former world champion, an Olympic silver medallist and a national champion. In the four years he rowed for Australia at the premier world regatta he won a medal each time.

== Club and state rowing ==
Richards' senior rowing was from the Wendouree-Ballarat Rowing Club.

Richards rowed in Victorian representative men's lightweight fours contesting the Penrith Cup at the Interstate Regatta within the Australian Rowing Championships from 1997 to 2000. He stroked those Victorian crews in all four of those years.

== International representative rowing ==
Richards first represented Australia in the lightweight eight at the Aiguebelette 1997 where the Australians won a thrilling final by 0.03 seconds with only 1.5 lengths separating the field. There Richards won his first and only world championship title. For Cologne 1998 and then at St Catharine's 1999 Richards stroked the Australian lightweight coxless four with his Ballarat team-mate Anthony Edwards, Darren Balmforth and the Tasmanian champion Simon Burgess. That four took bronze in 1998 and silver in 1999.

That same lightweight coxless four stayed together for the Sydney 2000 Olympics. The event showcased two match races between the Australians and the French crew. They met in a semi-final where the Australians, with Richards setting the pace, pipped the French by 3/100ths of a second. In the final the Australians led for much of the race. The French tried once to break through and failed, then a second time and failed and finally with a matter of metres to go broke through to win by less than half a second. Both races were a superb highlight of the regatta and won Richards Olympic silver in his last Australian representative appearance.
