= Vladyslav Tereshchenko =

Ukrainian canoeist

Personal information
- Born: 25 March 1972 (age 54)

Sport
- Sport: Canoe racing

Vladyslav Tereshchenko (born 25 March 1972) is a Ukrainian sprint canoeist who competed from the mid-1990s to the early 2000s (decade). He was eliminated in the semifinals of both the K-1 500 m and the K-1 1000 m events at the 1996 Summer Olympics in Atlanta. Four years later in Sydney, Tereshchenko was eliminated in the semifinals of the K-1 1000 m event.
