= Iván Álvarez (footballer, born 1980) =

Chilean footballer

Personal information
- Full name: Iván Marcelo Álvarez Valenzuela
- Date of birth: 20 January 1980 (age 46)
- Place of birth: Curicó, Chile
- Height: 5 ft 9 in (1.75 m)
- Position: Forward

Youth career
- Escuela Municipal Curicó
- 1993–1999: Universidad Católica

Senior career*
Years	Team	Apps	(Gls)
2000–2001	Universidad Católica	2	(0)
2002	Deportes Temuco	28	(7)
2003	Rangers	30	(7)
2004	Santiago Wanderers	9	(4)
2004	Cobreloa	4	(0)
2005	Palestino	14	(2)
2005	Deportes Concepción	11	(2)
2006–2009	Deportes Puerto Montt	56	(10)
2006	→ Jorge Wilstermann (loan)	12	(5)
2008	→ Deportes Melipilla (loan)	28	(5)
2009–2011	Rangers	45	(9)

International career
1997	Chile U17		
- * Club domestic league appearances and goals

Iván Marcelo Álvarez Valenzuela (born 20 January 1980 in Curicó) is a former Chilean football forward. His last club was Rangers de Talca.

== Club career ==
Born in Curicó, as a child, Álvarez and his twin brother, Cristián, were with Escuela de Fútbol Municipal de Curicó (Municipal Football Academy of Curicó), later named Juventud 2000, what was founded by his father Luis Hernán. Next, he began to play in Club Deportivo Universidad Católica youth system, being promoted to first adult in 2000. The next year was sent on loan to second-tier side Deportes Temuco, where he helped to achieve the Primera B title, being him one of the tournament's goalscorer with 14 scores.

After being released from Católica, between 2003 and 2004 he played for Rangers de Talca (where he had a good spell), Santiago Wanderers and Palestino.

After playing for Deportes Concepción in 2005, the incoming year, he joined Bolivian side Jorge Wilstermann. Then, from 2007 to 2009, he played for Deportes Puerto Montt (except in 2008 when was loaned to Deportes Melipilla).

In 2011, he retired from football, being his last club Rangers de Talca (now in the second division), when achieved the promotion to top-tier.

== International career ==
Álvarez and his twin brother, Cristián, represented Chile at under-17 level in both the 1997 South American Championship and the 1997 FIFA World Championship.

== Personal life ==
He is the twin brother of Cristián Álvarez and son of Luis Hernán Álvarez, legendary scorer of Chilean giants Colo-Colo.

Álvarez also worked as a panelist of a football program in Canal del Fútbol (CDF) called En El Nombre del Fútbol.

== Honours ==
=== Club ===
Deportes Temuco

- Primera B (1): 2001

Cobreloa

- Primera División de Chile (1): 2004 Clausura
