= Konstantin Yemelyanov (sailor) =

Russian sailor

Personal information
- Nationality: Russian
- Born: 29 August 1968 (age 56)

Sport
- Sport: Sailing

Konstantin Yemelyanov (born 29 August 1968) is a Russian sailor. He competed in the Tornado event at the 2000 Summer Olympics.
