= Juan José Ribera =

Chilean footballer and manager (born 1980)

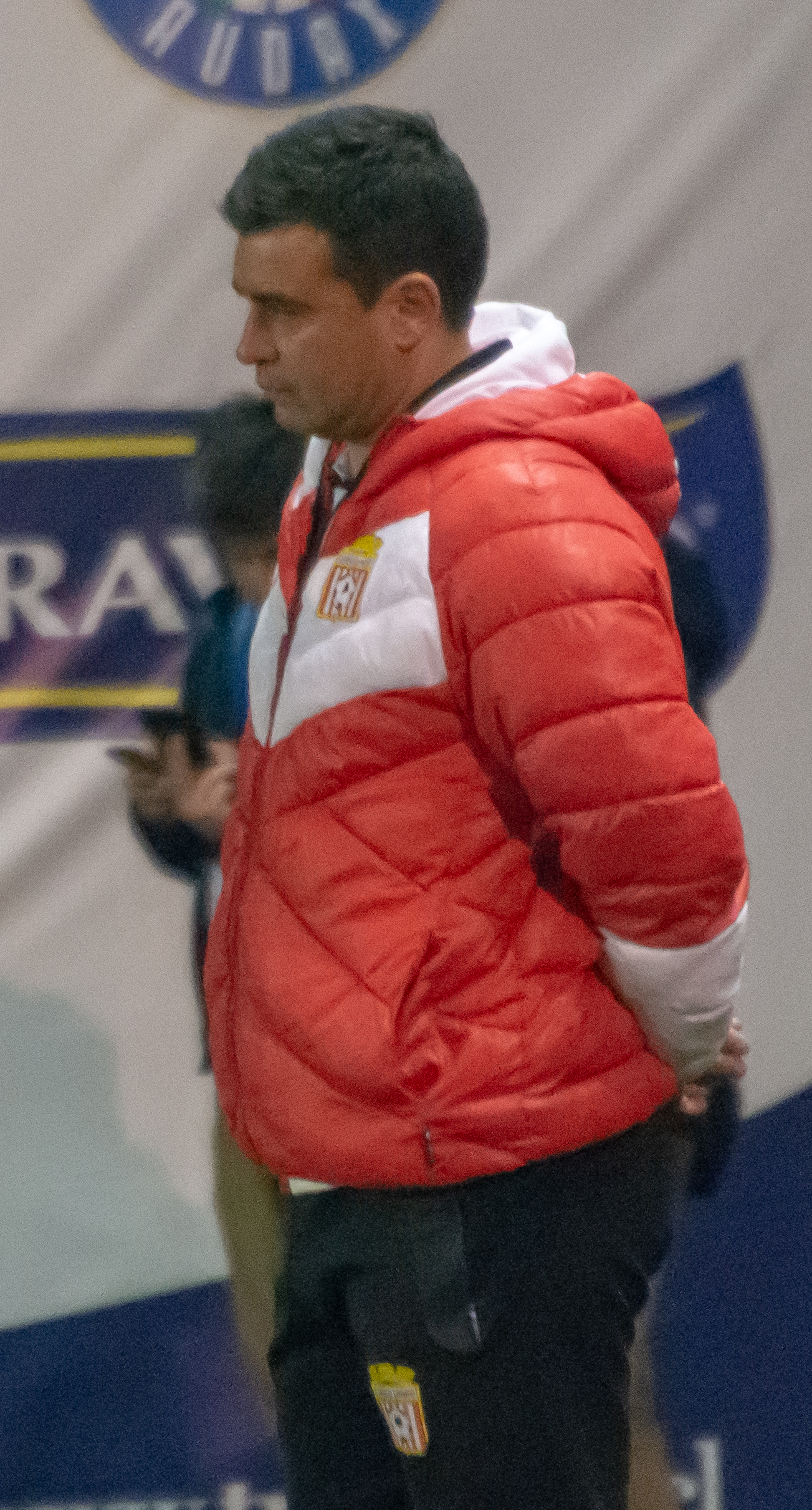
- Ribera leading Curicó Unido in 2023

Personal information
- Full name: Juan José Ribera Fonseca
- Date of birth: 7 August 1980 (age 46)
- Place of birth: Temuco, Chile
- Height: 1.81 m (5 ft 11 in)
- Position: Midfielder

Youth career
- Colegio Bautista
- 1996–1997: Universidad Católica

Senior career*
Years	Team	Apps	(Gls)
1998–2002	Universidad Católica	10	(0)
2000	→ Provincial Osorno (loan)	24	(3)
2001	→ Deportes Puerto Montt (loan)	25	(2)
2003–2007	Universidad de Concepción	141	(23)
2005	→ Unión Española (loan)	42	(1)
2007	→ Everton (loan)	15	(2)
2008	Deportes Concepción	15	(1)
2008–2009	Ñublense	31	(1)
2010	Deportes La Serena	7	(1)
2010–2011	Santiago Morning	22	(1)
2012	Universidad de Concepción	25	(0)

International career
1997	Chile U17	1	(0)

Managerial career
- 2013–2014: Malleco Unido
- 2014–2015: Deportes Concepción
- 2015: Malleco Unido
- 2015–2017: Coquimbo Unido
- 2017–2018: Rangers
- 2018–2019: Audax Italiano
- 2020–2021: Coquimbo Unido
- 2021: Deportes Antofagasta
- 2022: Audax Italiano
- 2023: Deportes Temuco
- 2023: Curicó Unido
- 2024: San Luis
- 2024–2025: Audax Italiano
- 2026: Ñublense
- * Club domestic league appearances and goals

Juan José Ribera Fonseca (born 11 October 1980) is a Chilean football manager and former player who played as a midfielder.

== Playing career ==
Born in Temuco, Chile, Ribera was with a football academy and the Colegio Bautista team before joining the Universidad Católica youth ranks in 1996.

Ribera played for Chile in the 1997 FIFA U-17 World Championship in Egypt.

== Coaching career ==
In addition to professional football, Ribera has been in charge of a football academy in Angol affiliated to Universidad Católica, just like another former players such as René Valenzuela, Carlos Verdugo, Luciano Saavedra, Ian Mac-Niven, among others.

In 2024, Ribera assumed as manager of San Luis de Quillota. In July 2024, he switched to Audax Italiano and left them in November 2025.

In 2026, Ribera led Ñublense until 13 October.

== Honours ==
=== Player ===
Universidad Católica

- Primera División de Chile: 2002 Apertura

Unión Española

- Primera División de Chile: 2005 Apertura
