= Jorge Morgenstern (footballer) =

Brazilian footballer (born 1972)

Personal information
- Date of birth: 2 April 1972 (age 54)
- Place of birth: Guarujá do Sul, Santa Catarina, Brazil
- Position: Defender

Youth career
- 1987–1990: Toledo

Senior career*
Years	Team	Apps	(Gls)
1990–1993	Toledo		
1994–1995	Paraná		
1994	→ União Bandeirante (loan)		
1995	→ Toledo (loan)		
1996	União Bandeirante		
1997	Apucarana		
1997	Avaí		
1998	Apucarana		
1998	Criciúma	5	(0)
1998–1999	Penafiel	18	(0)
1999	Rio Branco		
2000	Paraguaçuense		
2000	Londrina		
2001–2002	Malutrom		
2003	Cianorte		
- * Club domestic league appearances and goals

Jorge Morgenstern (born 2 April 1972) is a Brazilian former professional footballer who played as a defender.

== Playing career ==
Born in Guarujá do Sul, Santa Catarina, Brazil, Morgenstern began playing youth football for Campeonato Catarinense Série B side Toledo in 1987, making his senior debut in 1990. His first first-minute appearance came one year later, and remained at the club until 1993. Morgenstern joined Paraná in 1994, winning the Campeonato Paranaense. He was loaned to Série C side União Bandeirante in the same year, and to Toledo in 1995.

Morgenstern returned to União Bandeirante in 1996, winning the Campeonato do Interior Paranaense, before joining Apucarana in 1997, where he won also won the same championship. Morgenstern moved to Avaí the same year, then returned to Apucarana in the first half of 1998. In the second half, he moved to Criciúma, playing eight games in all competitions.

Morgenstern had his only experience abroad in 1998–99, playing 18 games for Penafiel in the Portuguese Second Division. He returned to Brazil in 1999, helping Rio Branco reach the final of the Campeonato Paranaense. In 2000 Morgenstern played for Londrina, then moved to Paraguaçuense in the Campeonato Paulista Série A2 the same year. Between 2001 and 2002 he played for Malutrom, then finished his career at Cianorte, retiring aged 31 due to injuries.

== Managerial career ==
Following his retirement as a player, Morgenstern worked as an advisor for the under-17 and under-20 teams of newly-founded Toledo Colônia Work between 2004 and 2012. Between 2012 and 2018, he was head of the Regional Office of Sport and Tourism of Paraná.

In 2011, he founded the Genoma Colorado La Salle, a franchise of Sport Club Internacional. In 2016, they formed a partnership with Toledo Esporte Clube (TEC).

== Personal life ==
Morgenstern is of Lebanese descent; he is the brother of former Lebanon national team player Jadir. Morgenstern has a degree in Physical Education.

He and his wife, Franciele (née De Marchi), have two children: Mariá and Benício.

== Honours ==
Paraná

- Campeonato Paranaense: 1994

União Bandeirante

- Campeonato do Interior Paranaense: 1996

Apucarana

- Campeonato do Interior Paranaense: 1997

Rio Branco

- Campeonato Paranaense runner-up: 1999

== See also ==
- List of association football families
