= Aleksandr Zyuzin =

Russian rower

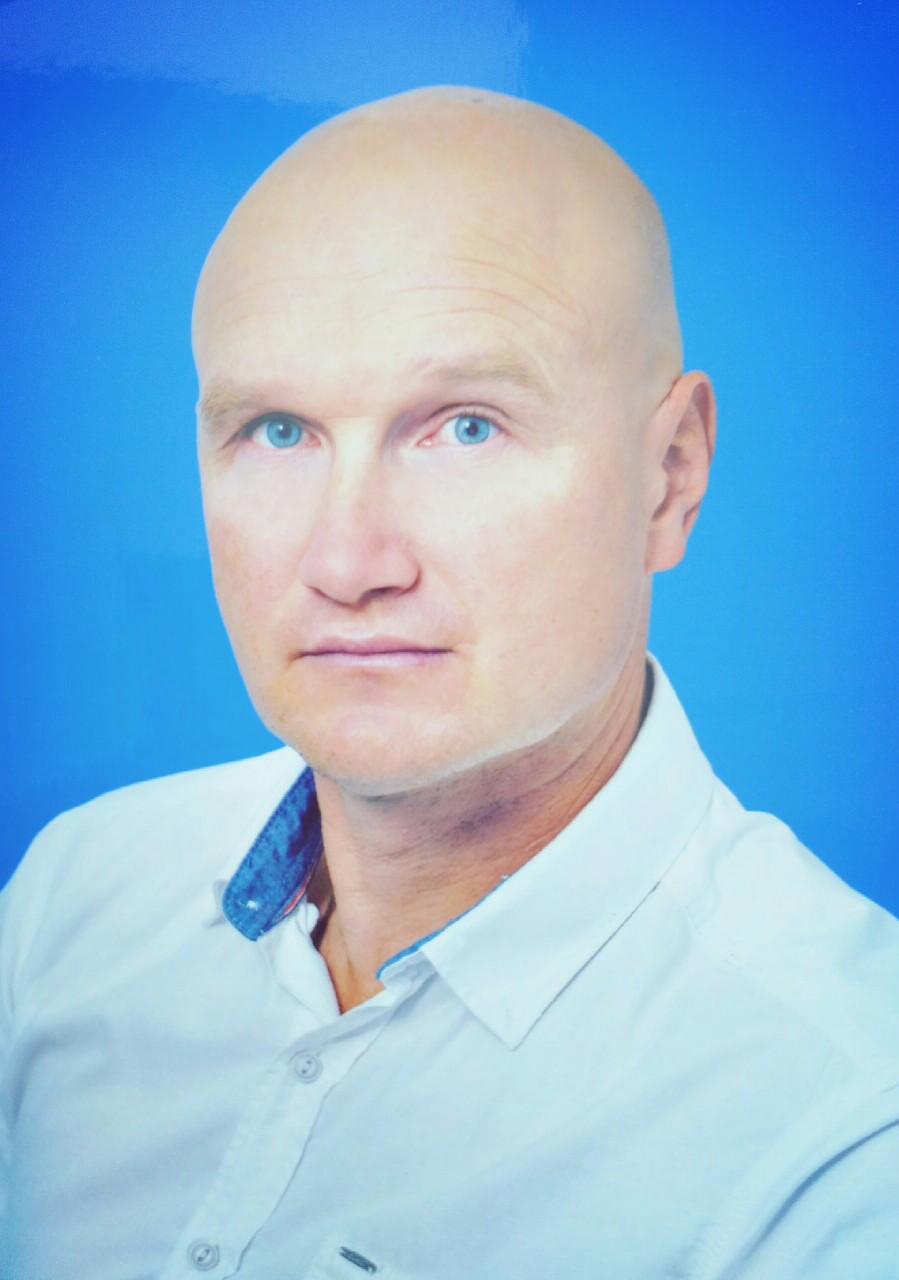

Personal information
- Nationality: Russian
- Born: 5 February 1976 (age 49); Zhivet, Lipetsk Oblast, Russian SFSR

Sport
- Sport: Rowing

Aleksandr Zyuzin (born 5 February 1976) is a Russian rower. He competed at the 2000 Summer Olympics and the 2004 Summer Olympics.
