= Stig Raagaard Hansen =

Danish sailor

Personal information
- Nationality: Danish
- Born: 29 November 1962 (age 63)

Sport
- Sport: Sailing

Stig Raagaard Hansen (born 29 November 1962) is a Danish sailor. He competed in the Tornado event at the 2000 Summer Olympics.
