= Simon Kolkman =

Dutch rower

Medal record

Men's rowing

Representing the Netherlands

World Rowing Championships
Silver medal – second place	2001 Lucerne	LM2-

Simon Kolkman (born 17 August 1977 in Hengelo) is a Dutch rower.
