= Aleksandr Yanin =

Russian sailor

Personal information
- Full name: Russian: Александр Валерьевич Янин
- Nationality: Russian
- Born: 21 February 1967 (age 58)

Sport
- Sport: Sailing

Aleksandr Valeryevich Yanin (Russian: Александр Валерьевич Янин; born 21 February 1967) is a Russian sailor. He competed in the Tornado event at the 2000 Summer Olympics.
