= Dmitry Kartashov (rower) =

Russian rower

Personal information
- Nationality: Russian
- Born: 24 October 1972 (age 52); Moscow, Russia

Sport
- Sport: Rowing

Dmitry Kartashov (born 24 October 1972) is a Russian rower. He competed at the 1996 Summer Olympics and the 2000 Summer Olympics.
