= Herbert Jans =

Chilean rower

Personal information
- Born: 15 February 1979 (age 46); Valdivia, Chile

Sport
- Sport: Rowing

Herbert Jans (born 15 February 1979) is a Chilean rower. He competed in the men's lightweight coxless four event at the 2000 Summer Olympics.
