= Patricio Ormazábal =

Chilean footballer and manager (born 1979)

Personal information
- Full name: Luis Patricio Ormazábal Mozó
- Date of birth: February 12, 1979 (age 47)
- Place of birth: Curicó, Chile
- Height: 1.70 m (5 ft 7 in)
- Position: Midfielder

Youth career
- Escuela Municipal Curicó
- 1991–1997: Universidad Católica

Senior career*
Years	Team	Apps	(Gls)
1997–2003	Universidad Católica	163	(11)
2003–2004	San Lorenzo	32	(2)
2004	Arsenal	10	(0)
2005–2006	Universidad de Chile	44	(2)
2005	→ Dorados de Sinaloa (loan)	15	(0)
2007–2008	Universidad Católica	37	(2)
2008–2010	Huachipato	24	(1)
2011–2012	Curicó Unido	58	(1)
Total		383	(19)

International career
1995	Chile U17		
1999	Chile U20		
2000	Chile U23		
2000–2003	Chile	7	(0)

Managerial career
- 2013–2018: Universidad Católica (youth)
- 2014: Universidad Católica (caretaker)
- 2019: Magallanes
- 2020–2023: Chile U20
- 2025–: Universidad Católica (youth)
- * Club domestic league appearances and goals

Luis Patricio Ormazábal Mozó (born February 12, 1979), known as Patricio Ormazábal, is a Chilean football manager and former footballer who played as a midfielder.

== Club career ==
As a child, Ormazábal was with Escuela de Fútbol Municipal de Curicó (Municipal Football Academy of Curicó), later named Juventud 2000, what was founded by the former professional footballer Luis Hernán Álvarez. Next, he moved to Universidad Católica youth ranks. Once in Universidad Católica, he started to alternate with the starting lineup ever since his debut in 1997. He played all over the midfield either as a defensive or double 5, side-half or even as an attacking midfielder. His role on the team became bigger each year earning the right to be 2nd team captain after Miguel Ramírez.

In 2003, he was transferred to San Lorenzo de Almagro and played under ex-teammate Néstor Raúl Gorosito. He only lasted half season there, and moved on to Arsenal de Sarandí.

In the 2004 offseason, he struck all Universidad Católica supporters by signing with archrival Universidad de Chile. This move was considered as a huge back stab from the former captain.

A year later, he was transferred to Dorados de Sinaloa, where he did not find much playing time. He soon returned to Universidad de Chile for the 2006 season making his relationship with Universidad Católica's fans even worse.

In 2007, he returned to Católica, after coach José del Solar allowed the transfer to go down. He has stated that he finally feels at home, at his youth club, but fans have not given him a proper welcome.

== International career ==
Ormazábal represented Chile at under-17 level in the 2017 South American Championship and at under-20 level in the 1999 South American Championship.

In 2000, he represented Chile in both the 2000 CONMEBOL Pre-Olympic Tournament and the 2000 Summer Olynmpics, winning the bronze medal.

At senior level, he made seven appearances for Chile between 2000 and 2003.

== Coaching career ==
In July 2025, Ormazábal returned to Universidad Católica as coach of the under-18 team.

== Honours ==
=== Player ===
Universidad Católica

- Primera División de Chile (2): 1997 Apertura, 2002 Apertura

Chile Olympic

- Olympic bronze medal (1): 2000
