= Rafał Głażewski =

Polish canoeist

Rafał Głażewski (born April 9, 1980 in Gorzów Wielkopolski) is a Polish sprint canoer who competed in the early to mid-2000s. Competing in two Summer Olympics, he earned his best finish of eighth in the K-4 1000 m event at Athens in 2004.
