= Guarujá do Sul =

Coordinates: 26.3853°S 53.5278°W

- Municipality
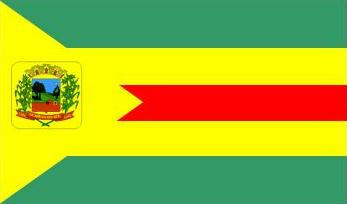
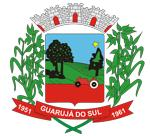
- Flag Coat of arms
- Interactive map of Guarujá do Sul
- Country: Brazil
- Region: South
- State: Santa Catarina
- Mesoregion: Oeste Catarinense

Population (2020)
  - Total: 5,178
- Time zone: UTC -3

Guarujá do Sul is a municipality in the state of Santa Catarina in the South region of Brazil.

== See also ==
- List of municipalities in Santa Catarina
