= Marcus Mielke =

German rower

Medal record

Men's rowing

Representing Germany

World Rowing Championships
Gold medal – first place	1996 Strathclyde	LM8+
Bronze medal – third place	1997 Aiguebelette	LM4-

Marcus Mielke (born 31 January 1975, in Mühlacker) is a German rower.
