= Andrey Shevel =

Russian rower

Personal information
- Full name: Andrey Vladimirovich Shevel
- Nationality: Russian
- Born: 7 July 1972 (age 52); Kaliningrad, Russia

Sport
- Sport: Rowing

Andrey Vladimirovich Shevel (Russian: Андрей Владимирович Шевель; born 7 July 1972) is a Russian rower. He competed at the 1996 Summer Olympics and the 2000 Summer Olympics.
