= Pierre Lubac =

French canoeist

Pierre Lubac (born 17 February 1968) is a French sprint canoer who competed from the late 1980s to the early 2000s (decade). Competing in four Summer Olympics, he earned his best finish of fifth in the K-2 1000 m event at Atlanta in 1996.
