= Søren Madsen =

Danish rower (born 1976)

Medal record

Men's rowing
Bronze medal – third place	2000 Sydney	Lightweight coxless four

Søren Madsen (born 31 May 1976 in Middelfart, Denmark) is a Danish rower who won a bronze medal at the 2000 Summer Olympics with the Gold Four. He was born in Middelfart. In the 2000 Olympics, he was a member of the Danish boat which finished third in the lightweight coxless fours event.
