= Jan Knobelauch Hansen =

Danish triathlete (born 1971)

Jan Knobelauch Hansen (born 15 July 1971) is a male athlete from Denmark. He competes in triathlon.

Hansen competed at the first Olympic triathlon at the 2000 Summer Olympics. He took forty-fourth place with a total time of 1:55:42.06.
