= Torsten Tranum =

Danish sprint canoeist (born 1979)

Medal record

Men's canoe sprint

World Championships
Bronze medal – third place	1999 Milan	K-1 1000 m

Torsten Tranum (born July 24, 1979) is a Danish sprint canoeist who competed in the late 1990s and the early 2000s. He won a bronze medal in the K-1 1000 m event at the 1999 ICF Canoe Sprint World Championships in Milan.

At the 2000 Summer Olympics in Sydney, he finished sixth in the K-1 1000 m event.
