= 1963 Campeonato Nacional Primera División =

Campeonato Nacional de Fútbol Profesional
- Dates: 11 May 1963 – 5 January 1964
- Champions: Colo-Colo (9th title)
- Relegated: O'Higgins
- Copa de Campeones: Colo-Colo
- Matches: 306
- Goals: 1,039 (3.4 per match)
- Top goalscorer: Luis Álvarez (37 goals)
- Biggest home win: Colo-Colo 7–0 Unión San Felipe (2 June)
- Highest attendance: 73,440 Universidad de Chile 3–3 Universidad Católica (15 August)
- Total attendance: 3,793,748
- Average attendance: 12,438

The 1963 Campeonato Nacional de Fútbol Profesional, was the 31st season of top-flight football in Chile. Colo-Colo won their ninth title following a 2–1 win against Universidad Católica in the championship last match day on 4 January 1964, also qualifying to the 1964 Copa de Campeones de America.

== Final table ==
Pos	Team	Pld	W	D	L	GF	GA	GD	Pts	Qualification or relegation
1	Colo-Colo	34	24	5	5	103	46	+57	53	Champions and qualified for the Copa de Campeones
2	Universidad de Chile	34	23	6	5	78	42	+36	52	
3	Deportes La Serena	34	18	7	9	64	54	+10	43	
4	Rangers	34	16	9	9	69	39	+30	41	
5	Universidad Católica	34	15	11	8	66	52	+14	41	
6	Everton	34	17	4	13	57	59	−2	38	
7	Santiago Wanderers	34	11	12	11	54	46	+8	34	
8	Unión San Felipe	34	11	12	11	68	72	−4	34	
9	Magallanes	34	12	8	14	53	58	−5	32	
10	Ferrobádminton	34	11	9	14	45	53	−8	31	
11	Unión Española	34	12	5	17	68	68	0	29	
12	San Luis	34	11	7	16	40	62	−22	29	
13	Coquimbo Unido	34	9	10	15	47	60	−13	28	
14	Unión La Calera	34	10	7	17	50	75	−25	27	
15	Audax Italiano	34	8	10	16	44	62	−18	26	
16	Santiago Morning	34	9	7	18	44	62	−18	25	
17	Palestino	34	9	7	18	48	71	−23	25	
18	O'Higgins	34	10	4	20	41	58	−17	24	Relegated to Segunda División

== Results ==
Home \ Away	AUD	COL	CQU	EVE	FEB	DLS	MAG	OHI	PAL	RAN	USF	SLU	SMO	ULC	UES	UCA	UCH	SWA
Audax		2–2	3–0	2–3	1–0	1–3	1–3	0–0	3–1	2–2	2–2	2–0	2–2	3–2	1–1	1–5	0–4	1–1
Colo-Colo	3–1		4–2	2–0	5–1	7–1	2–2	3–2	4–1	4–1	7–0	3–0	4–2	3–0	2–1	3–3	2–0	0–2
Coquimbo	3–0	2–4		0–1	1–1	1–0	2–1	1–0	4–2	0–0	3–1	3–3	1–1	2–2	3–1	2–0	2–3	1–1
Everton	3–2	0–2	5–2		2–0	3–0	0–0	1–0	3–1	1–1	5–2	2–1	3–3	2–1	3–2	2–2	2–7	1–0
Ferrobádminton	1–1	0–0	2–0	0–2		2–3	3–1	2–0	2–1	1–1	1–0	0–2	2–2	5–4	4–2	1–0	1–2	1–1
La Serena	2–0	2–1	1–1	4–1	1–0		3–2	6–3	2–0	0–0	4–0	3–0	1–0	2–1	2–0	2–2	3–2	2–1
Magallanes	2–2	4–0	2–0	1–0	1–1	1–3		1–2	1–0	0–6	2–2	3–0	3–0	2–0	1–0	3–3	1–3	1–0
O'Higgins	3–1	1–3	1–0	0–1	0–3	1–0	2–0		1–2	3–1	1–1	4–2	2–1	1–1	2–2	0–1	1–3	4–3
Palestino	1–4	2–5	2–1	2–1	2–4	2–2	1–2	1–0		0–2	4–4	3–1	1–0	3–2	3–4	4–1	0–0	1–1
Rangers	0–0	1–0	4–0	4–0	4–0	2–0	5–2	1–0	1–0		3–3	2–0	5–1	5–1	1–1	2–3	0–2	1–1
San Felipe	2–1	1–1	1–1	6–1	2–1	2–2	5–4	4–1	2–2	3–4		4–0	2–1	3–0	2–1	1–2	2–3	1–1
San Luis	1–0	2–6	0–0	2–0	2–0	1–1	2–1	2–0	1–1	1–0	1–2		2–0	1–0	2–1	2–2	1–2	1–1
S. Morning	1–2	0–4	2–1	3–1	2–0	1–4	2–2	3–1	0–0	0–2	1–2	2–0		3–0	2–1	0–0	1–2	2–1
La Calera	3–1	2–8	1–1	2–1	3–2	2–1	1–3	1–0	2–0	1–0	2–2	1–1	1–3		3–1	0–3	1–0	2–0
U. Española	2–0	2–3	4–2	3–4	1–2	3–1	4–1	1–3	4–1	3–0	3–2	1–3	5–2	2–2		3–2	0–3	1–1
U. Católica	0–1	1–2	2–1	0–3	3–1	3–0	1–0	2–0	3–1	3–1	1–1	3–2	2–1	3–3	1–3		1–1	3–0
U. de Chile	2–0	3–1	2–3	1–0	1–1	1–1	2–0	2–1	2–0	0–5	3–1	5–0	2–0	4–2	3–2	3–3		3–2
S. Wanderers	2–1	2–3	3–1	1–0	0–0	6–1	0–0	1–0	2–3	3–2	3–0	4–1	1–0	4–1	1–3	2–2	2–2	

Legend: Blue = home team win; Yellow = draw; Red = away team win.

== Title ==
Campeonato Profesional
1963 champion
Colo-Colo
9th title

== Topscorer ==
Name	Team	Goals
(Chile) Luis Álvarez	Colo-Colo	37
