= Daniele Bodini =

American businessman (born 1945)

Daniele D. Bodini
- Born: December 20, 1945 (age 80); Erba, Italy
- Education: University of Rome (MA); Columbia University (MBA)
- Occupations: Real estate developer; ambassador

Daniele D. Bodini (born December 20, 1945) is an Italian American businessman who founded American Continental Properties Group (ACPG). He also served as San Marino's permanent representative to the United Nations from 2005 to 2016.

== Biography ==
Bodini was born in Erba, Italy, and received an MA in engineering from the University of Rome in 1968 and an MA in architecture in 1970. In 1972, he received an MBA from Columbia Business School.

He was an assistant professor at the School of Engineering of the University of Rome. He was also an investment banker with Blyth, Eastman Dillon & Co. before starting his own real estate investment company, American Continental Properties Group, in 1978. He was called the leading Italian real estate developer in the United States by La Repubblica.

He chairs the Alexander Bodini Foundation, which supports a variety of research programs and fellowships at Columbia Business School and the Italian Academy for Advanced Studies in America.

Bodini was the subject of media attention in 2019, when a helicopter owned by Bodini crashed into an office building in Manhattan.

Bodini is also active in the philanthropy scene, serving as chairman of the American-Italian Cancer Foundation, the Foundation for Italian Art & Culture, and San Patrignano USA. In 2021, he inaugurated the Bodini Center for Italian Philanthropy in New York City that hosts a number Italian non-profits operating in the United States.

== Personal life and family ==
He was married to Toni Allen Kramer, daughter of Tony Award-winning producer Terry Allen Kramer and investment banker Irvin Hamilton Kramer. Kramer's grandfather, Charles Allen, founded the boutique investment bank Allen & Company. His brother-in-law is film director Nathaniel Kramer. Bodini has a daughter with Kramer, Francesca Bodini.
