= Bernd Wakolbinger =

Austrian rower

Personal information
- Born: 2 February 1976 (age 50)

Sport
- Sport: Rowing
Medal record
Men's rowing
Representing Austria
World Rowing Championships
| Gold medal – first place | 2001 Lucerne | Lwt men's four |

Bernd Wakolbinger (born 2 February 1976) is an Austrian lightweight rower. He won a gold medal at the 2001 World Rowing Championships in Lucerne with the lightweight men's four.
