= Helene Hansen (sailor) =

Danish sailor

Personal information
- Nationality: Danish
- Born: 21 May 1968 (age 58)

Sport
- Sport: Sailing

Helene Hansen (born 21 May 1968) is a Danish sailor. She competed in the Tornado event at the 2000 Summer Olympics.
