= Karen Hansen (sport shooter) =

Danish sports shooter (born 1959)

Personal information
- Nationality: Danish
- Born: 2 April 1959 (age 66)

Sport
- Sport: Sports shooting

Karen Hansen (born 2 April 1959) is a Danish sports shooter. She competed at the 1992 Summer Olympics and the 2000 Summer Olympics.
