= Jorge Morgenstern (rower) =

Chilean rower

Personal information
- Born: 23 September 1980 (age 44); Valdivia, Chile

Sport
- Sport: Rowing

Jorge Morgenstern (born 23 September 1980) is a Chilean rower. He competed in the men's lightweight coxless four event at the 2000 Summer Olympics.
