= Dennis Otzen Jensen =

Danish swimmer

Personal information
- Full name: Dennis Otzen Jensen
- National team: Denmark
- Born: 2 December 1974 (age 51) Ballerup, Denmark
- Height: 1.80 m (5 ft 11 in)
- Weight: 70 kg (154 lb)

Sport
- Sport: Swimming
- Strokes: Freestyle, butterfly
- Club: Svømmeklubben Triton
- Coach: John Ludvigsen

Dennis Otzen Jensen (born 2 December 1974) is a Danish former swimmer, who specialized in sprint freestyle and butterfly events. He is a 2000 Olympian, and a member of Triton Swimming Club in Skovlunde (Danish: Svømmeklubben Triton) under his personal coach John Ludvigsen.

Jensen competed in three swimming events, including all freestyle relays, for Denmark at the 2000 Summer Olympics in Sydney. He achieved a FINA B-cut of 55.31 (100 m butterfly) from the European Championships in Helsinki. In the 100 m butterfly, Jensen challenged seven other swimmers in heat four, including Yugoslav teenager Milorad Čavić (aged 16), who later disqualified for a false start. He raced to a fifth seed and forty-second overall by almost a full body length behind winner Simão Morgado of Portugal in 55.70. A member of the Danes, he also placed eighteenth in the 4×100 m freestyle relay (3:24.78), and eleventh in the 4×200 m freestyle relay (7:24.63).
