= Jeppe Nielsen =

Danish swimmer (born 1974)

Jeppe Bøje Nielsen
Personal information
- Full name: Jeppe Bøje Nielsen
- Nationality: Denmark
- Born: 7 March 1974 (age 52) Holbæk
- Height: 1.80 m (5 ft 11 in)
- Weight: 82 kg (181 lb)

Sport
- Sport: Swimming
- Strokes: Freestyle
- Club: Rødby Svømmeklub, CACEL de Nice, VAT-89, University of Cincinnati Bearcats, Racing Club de France, Helsingør Svømmeklub

Jeppe Bøje Nielsen (born 7 March 1974) is a former freestyle swimmer from Denmark, who competed for his native country at the 2000 Summer Olympics in Sydney, Australia.
