= Ian Mac-Niven =

Chilean footballer

Personal information
- Full name: Ian Patricio Mac-Niven Carlsson
- Date of birth: 25 October 1971 (age 55)
- Place of birth: Santiago, Chile
- Position: Attacking midfielder

Youth career
- Universidad Católica

Senior career*
Years	Team	Apps	(Gls)
1990–1996	Universidad Católica	57	(5)
1993	→ Deportes Concepción (loan)	13	(1)
1994	→ Deportes Antofagasta (loan)	17	(2)
1997	Deportes Tolima	0	(0)

International career
1991	Chile U20		
1992	Chile U23		
1995	Chile	2	(0)
- * Club domestic league appearances and goals

Ian Patricio Mac-Niven Carlsson (born 25 October 1971) is a Chilean former professional footballer who played as an attacking midfielder.

== Career ==
A product of Universidad Católica youth system, Mac-Niven made his debut thanks to the coach Vicente Cantatore in 1991 and stayed with them until 1996, with stints on loan at Deportes Concepción (1993) and Deportes Antofagasta (1994). In 1997, he joined Colombian side Deportes Tolima, but he didn't make any appearances.

At youth international level, he represented Chile at under-20 level in the 1991 South American Championship and at under-23 level in the 1992 Pre-Olympic Tournament.

At senior international level, he represented Chile in two friendlies in 1995.

== After football ==
Mac-Niven graduated as a journalist and got a degree in sport management at the European University of Madrid.

He worked for the Football Federation of Chile as head of logistics of the Chile senior team from 2017 to 2021.

Mac-Niven has also been in charge of football academies affiliated to Universidad Católica in Recoleta, Ñuñoa and Talcahuano, just like other former players such as René Valenzuela, Carlos Verdugo, Luciano Saavedra, Juan José Ribera, among others.

Since March 2024, he performs as co-host of the program Fútbol y Parrilla (Football and Grill) on YouTube alongside the former footballer Fernando Vergara.

== Honours ==
Universidad Católica

- Copa Chile: 1991, 1995
