= René Valenzuela =

Chilean footballer (born 1955)

Personal information
- Full name: Eduardo René Valenzuela Becker
- Date of birth: April 20, 1955 (age 71)
- Place of birth: Concepcion, Chile
- Height: 1.80 m (5 ft 11 in)
- Position: Centre back

Senior career*
Years	Team	Apps	(Gls)
1974–1977	Deportes Concepción		
1978–1979	O'Higgins		
1980–1987	Universidad Católica		
1987–1988	Ángeles de Puebla		
1988–1989	Union Española		

International career
1979–1988	Chile	46	(0)

Managerial career
- Universidad Católica (youth)
- * Club domestic league appearances and goals

Eduardo René Valenzuela Becker (born April 20, 1955), known as René Valenzuela, is a Chilean former footballer who played as a defender.

== Career ==
Valenzuela represented his native country at the 1982 FIFA World Cup, wearing the number three jersey. He played for several clubs in Chile, including Universidad Católica. For Chile he played 46 matches between 1979 and 1985.

Following his retirement, he has worked as coach at youth level in academies such as Universidad Catolica Academy in Rancagua, just like another former players such as Juan José Ribera, Carlos Verdugo, Luciano Saavedra, Ian Mac-Niven, among others.

== Honours ==
Universidad Católica

- Chilean Primera División: 1984
- Copa Polla Gol: 1983
- Copa República: 1983

Unión Española

- Copa de Invierno: 1989
