= Luciano Saavedra =

Chilean footballer (born 1972)

Personal information
- Full name: Luciano Andrés Saavedra Olguín
- Date of birth: 15 September 1972 (age 54)
- Place of birth: Romeral, Chile
- Position: Attacking midfielder

Youth career
- 21 de Mayo
- Curicó Unido
- 1991: Universidad Católica

Senior career*
Years	Team	Apps	(Gls)
1990–1991	Curicó Unido		
1991–1992	Universidad Católica		
1993–1994	Santiago Wanderers		
1994	Curicó Unido		
1995–1997	Unión Española	29	(0)
1997–1998	Real Zacatecas		
1999–2000	Deportes Linares		
- * Club domestic league appearances and goals

Luciano Andrés Saavedra Olguín (born 15 September 1972) is a Chilean former football player who played as an attacking midfielder.

== Playing career ==
Born in Romeral, Chile, Saavedra was with both 21 de Mayo and Curicó Unido in Curicó, before joining Universidad Católica in 1991, where coincided with players such as Jaime Lo Presti, Marcelo Caro, among others.

In his homeland, he after played for Santiago Wanderers, Curicó Unido again, Unión Española and Deportes Linares, his last club.

Abroad, he played for Mexican side Real Sociedad de Zacatecas in 1997–98.

== Post-retirement ==
Saavedra graduated as a PE teacher at the Universidad Mayor.

Saavedra has been in charge of football academies affiliated to Universidad Católica in both Curicó and Macul, Santiago, just like another former players such as Juan José Ribera, René Valenzuela, Carlos Verdugo, Ian Mac-Niven, among others.

He has served as coordinator at national level for the Ministry of Sports and chief of staff for the Metropolitan Superintendence of Education.

His brother, Julio, is a former footballer of Curicó Unido and current politician who has served as councillor for the Municipality of Romeral.
