= Magnus Lövdén =

Swedish sailor

Personal information
- Nationality: Swedish
- Born: 6 June 1970 (age 54); Lund, Sweden

Sport
- Sport: Sailing

Magnus Lövdén (born 6 June 1970) is a Swedish sailor. He competed at the 1996 Summer Olympics and the 2000 Summer Olympics.
