= Carlos Verdugo =

Chilean footballer (born 1975)

Personal information
- Full name: Carlos Israel Verdugo Concha
- Date of birth: 6 September 1975 (age 51)
- Place of birth: Concepción, Chile
- Height: 1.74 m (5 ft 9 in)
- Position: Forward

Youth career
- Deportes Concepción

Senior career*
Years	Team	Apps	(Gls)
1997–2001	Deportes Concepción	61	(13)
1998	→ Ñublense (loan)		
2002–2003	Universidad Católica	57	(4)
2004–2005	Universidad de Concepción	55	(5)
2006	Unión San Felipe	17	(1)
2006	Águila		
2007–2008	Provincial Osorno	38	(2)
2009	San Marcos		

International career
2001	Chile	1	(0)
- * Club domestic league appearances and goals

Carlos Israel Verdugo Concha (born 6 September 1975) is a Chilean former professional footballer who played as a forward for clubs in Chile and El Salvador.

== Club career ==
Born in Concepción, Chile, he began his career with Deportes Concepción. Along with the club, he took part in the 2001 Copa Libertadores, a well remembered championship by the club fans where Verdugo scored two goals and the team was knocked out in round of 16 by Brazilian club Vasco da Gama. In Chile, he also played for Ñublense, Universidad Católica, Universidad de Concepción, Unión San Felipe, Provincial Osorno and San Marcos de Arica.

From 2002 to 2003 he played for Universidad Católica, winning the 2002 Apertura Championship in the Chilean Primera División.

From 2004 to 2005 he played for Universidad de Concepción, where he coincided with great players such as Esteban Paredes, the top goalscorer of the Chilean Primera División, Hugo Droguett and Luis Pedro Figueroa.

Abroad, he had a step with Águila from El Salvador in second half 2006.

In 2007, he joined Provincial Osorno and got promotion to Chilean Primera División after winning the 2007 Primera B. His last club was San Marcos de Arica in the Primera B in 2009.

== International career ==
Verdugo made an appearance for the Chile national team in the friendly match against Catalonia on 28 December 2001. He had replaced Jaime González in the squad after González ignored the call-up.

== Personal life ==
He was nicknamed Lulo.

He has worked for the Universidad Católica youth system as coordinator of the football academy in San Pedro de la Paz, Biobío Region, just like another former players such as René Valenzuela, Juan José Ribera, Luciano Saavedra, Ian Mac-Niven, among others.

== Honours ==
Universidad Católica

- Chilean Primera División: 2002 Apertura

Provincial Osorno

- Primera B de Chile: 2007
