= Taekwondo at the 2000 Summer Olympics – Qualification =

Taekwondo competitions at the 2000 Summer Olympics in Sydney were held from September 27 to September 30. There were four weight categories for both men and women. Each NOC could enter 2 men and 2 women, but only 1 athlete per weight category. There was one global Olympic Qualification Tournament and one qualification tournament for each continent. In addition, 7 invitational places were awarded.

== Timeline ==
Event	Date	Venue
World Qualification Tournament	July 8–11, 1999	Poreč, Croatia
African Qualification Tournament	September 9–10, 1999	Johannesburg, South Africa
Asian & Oceania Qualification Tournament	September 25–26, 1999	Manila, Philippines
Pan American Qualification Tournament	October 2–3, 1999	Miami, United States
European Qualification Tournament	October 16–17, 1999	Stockholm, Sweden

== Qualification summary ==
NOC	Men				Women				Total
NOC	−58 kg	−68 kg	−80 kg	+80 kg	−49 kg	−57 kg	−67 kg	+67 kg	Total
Argentina	X	X							2
Australia	X	X	X	X	X	X	X	X	8
Austria		X							1
Benin		X							1
Brazil						X			1
Canada								X	1
Chile			X						1
China				X			X	X	3
Chinese Taipei	X	X			X	X			4
Colombia				X					1
Croatia								X	1
Cuba			X	X	X			X	4
Denmark			X		X				2
Egypt	X			X		X			3
Finland							X	X	2
France				X				X	2
Germany		X	X		X				3
Great Britain				X			X		2
Greece	X			X		X			3
Guatemala	X								1
Hungary	X								1
Indonesia					X				1
Iran		X	X						2
Italy		X	X			X			3
Ivory Coast			X						1
Japan	X						X		2
Jordan			X						1
Kuwait	X								1
Lesotho			X		X				2
Libya		X							1
Malaysia								X	1
Mexico			X		X		X		3
Monaco		X							1
Morocco	X						X	X	3
Netherlands						X	X		2
Nicaragua				X					1
Norway							X		1
Philippines	X		X		X	X			4
Russia		X						X	2
Saudi Arabia				X					1
Slovenia			X						1
South Africa				X					1
South Korea		X		X		X	X		4
Spain	X	X					X	X	4
Swaziland	X								1
Sweden			X	X					2
Trinidad and Tobago						X			1
Turkey					X	X			2
United States	X	X			X		X		4
Venezuela								X	1
Vietnam					X	X			2
Total: 51 NOCs	14	14	14	13	12	12	12	12	103

== Men's events ==
=== −58 kg ===
Competition	Places	Qualified athletes
Host nation	1	Paul Lyons (AUS)
World Qualification Tournament	4	Huang Chih-hsiung (TPE); Gabriel Esparza (ESP); Kiyoteru Higuchi (JPN); Younes Sekkat (MAR)
African Qualification Tournament	1	Talaat Abada (EGY)
Asian & Oceania Qualification Tournament	2	Roberto Cruz (PHI); Naser Buftain (KUW)
Pan American Qualification Tournament	2	Jason Torres (USA); Gabriel Taraburelli (ARG)
European Qualification Tournament	2	József Salim (HUN); Michalis Mouroutsos (GRE)
Universality places	2	Gabriel Sagastume (GUA); Mfanukhona Dlamini (SWZ)
Total	14	

=== −68 kg ===
Competition	Places	Qualified athletes
Host nation	1	Carlo Massimino (AUS)
World Qualification Tournament	4	Hadi Saei (IRI); Tuncay Çalışkan (AUT); Aziz Acharki (GER); Claudio Nolano (ITA)
African Qualification Tournament	1	Stanislas Ogoudjobi (BEN)
Asian & Oceania Qualification Tournament	2	Kim Byung-uk (KOR); Hsu Chi-hung (TPE)
Pan American Qualification Tournament	2	Alejandro Hernando (ARG); Steven López (USA)
European Qualification Tournament	2	Francisco Zas (ESP); Aslanbek Dzitiev (RUS)
Universality places	2	Nizar Mohamed Naeeli (LBA); Olivier Bernasconi (MON)
Total	14	

=== −80 kg ===
Competition	Places	Qualified athletes
Host nation	1	Warren Hansen (AUS)
World Qualification Tournament	4	Muhammed Dahmani (DEN); Marcel More (SLO); Faissal Ebnoutalib (GER); Víctor Estrada (MEX)
African Qualification Tournament	1	Mokete Mokhosi (LES)
Asian & Oceania Qualification Tournament	2	Majid Aflaki (IRI); Donald Geisler (PHI)
Pan American Qualification Tournament	2	Ángel Matos (CUB); Félipe Soto (CHI)
European Qualification Tournament	2	Roman Livaja (SWE); Mario De Meo (ITA)
Universality places	2	Sebastien Konan (CIV); Mohammad Al-Fararjeh (JOR)
Total	14	

=== +80 kg ===
Competition	Places	Qualified athletes
Host nation	1	Daniel Trenton (AUS)
World Qualification Tournament	4	Pascal Gentil (FRA); Kim Je-kyoung (KOR); Yahia Rashwan (EGY); Colin Daley (GBR)
African Qualification Tournament	1	Donald Ravenscroft (RSA)
Asian & Oceania Qualification Tournament	2	Khaled Al-Dosari (KSA); Zhang Weiyong (CHN)
Pan American Qualification Tournament	2	Carlos Delgado (NCA); Nelson Sáenz (CUB)
European Qualification Tournament	2	Marcus Thorén (SWE); Alexandros Nikolaidis (GRE)
Universality places	1	Milton Castro (COL)
Total	13	

== Women's events ==
=== −49 kg ===
Competition	Places	Qualified athletes
Host nation	1	Lauren Burns (AUS)
World Qualification Tournament	4	Kay Poe (USA); Döndü Güvenç (TUR); Juana Wangsa Putri (INA); Nguyễn Thị Xuân Mai (VIE)
African Qualification Tournament	1	Likeleli Thamae (LES)
Asian & Oceania Qualification Tournament	2	Lai Huei-fang (TPE); Eva Marie Ditan (PHI)
Pan American Qualification Tournament	2	Yanelis Labrada (CUB); Águeda Pérez (MEX)
European Qualification Tournament	2	Fadime Helvacioglu (GER); Hanne Poulsen (DEN)
Total	12	

=== −57 kg ===
Competition	Places	Qualified athletes
Host nation	1	Cynthia Cameron (AUS)
World Qualification Tournament	4	Hamide Bıkçın (TUR); Cristiana Corsi (ITA); Kang Hae-eun (KOR); Hsu Chih-ling (TPE)
African Qualification Tournament	1	Shimaa Afifi (EGY)
Asian & Oceania Qualification Tournament	2	Trần Hiếu Ngân (VIE); Jasmin Strachan (PHI)
Pan American Qualification Tournament	2	Carmen Silva (BRA); Cheryl-Ann Sankar (TRI)
European Qualification Tournament	2	Virginia Lourens (NED); Areti Athanasopoulou (GRE)
Total	12	

=== −67 kg ===
Competition	Places	Qualified athletes
Host nation	1	Lisa O'Keefe (AUS)
World Qualification Tournament	4	Cho Hyang-mi (KOR); Ireane Ruíz (ESP); Sarah Stevenson (GBR); Mirjam Müskens (NED)
African Qualification Tournament	1	Meriem Bidani (MAR)
Asian & Oceania Qualification Tournament	2	Zhang Huijing (CHN); Yoriko Okamoto (JPN)
Pan American Qualification Tournament	2	Barbara Kunkel (USA); Mónica del Real (MEX)
European Qualification Tournament	2	Kirsimarja Koskinen (FIN); Trude Gundersen (NOR)
Total	12	

=== +67 kg ===
Competition	Places	Qualified athletes
Host nation	1	Tanya White (AUS)
World Qualification Tournament	4	Nataša Vezmar (CRO); Myriam Baverel (FRA); Natalia Ivanova (RUS); Adriana Carmona (VEN)
African Qualification Tournament	1	Mounia Bourguigue (MAR)
Asian & Oceania Qualification Tournament	2	Chen Zhong (CHN); Lee Wan Yuen (MAS)
Pan American Qualification Tournament	2	Dominique Bosshart (CAN); Sonallis Mayan (CUB)
European Qualification Tournament	2	Elena Benítez (ESP); Veera Liukkonen (FIN)
Total	12	
