= Mexico at the 2000 Summer Olympics =

- IOC code: MEX
- NOC: Mexican Olympic Committee
- Website: www.soycom.org (in Spanish)

in Sydney
- Competitors: 78 (52 men and 26 women) in 19 sports
- Flag bearer: Fernando Platas
- Medals Ranked 40th: Gold 1 Silver 2 Bronze 3 Total 6

Summer Olympics appearances (overview)
- 1900; 1904–1920; 1924; 1928; 1932; 1936; 1948; 1952; 1956; 1960; 1964; 1968; 1972; 1976; 1980; 1984; 1988; 1992; 1996; 2000; 2004; 2008; 2012; 2016; 2020; 2024

Mexico competed at the 2000 Summer Olympics in Sydney, Australia. 78 athletes, 52 men and 26 women, took part in 66 events in 19 sports.

== Medalists ==
Medal	Name	Sport	Event	Date
Gold	Soraya Jiménez	Weightlifting	Women's 58 kg	18 September
Silver	Noé Hernández	Athletics	Men's 20 kilometres walk	22 September
Silver	Fernando Platas	Diving	Men's 3 metre springboard	26 September
Bronze	Joel Sánchez	Athletics	Men's 50 kilometres walk	29 September
Bronze	Cristián Bejarano	Boxing	Men's lightweight	28 September
Bronze	Víctor Estrada	Taekwondo	Men's 80 kg	29 September

== Competitors ==
The following is the list of number of competitors in the Games.

Sport	Men	Women	Total
Archery	1	1	2
Athletics	15	7	22
Boxing	6	–	6
Canoeing	2	0	2
Cycling	1	1	2
Diving	4	3	7
Equestrian	4	0	4
Gymnastics	0	1	1
Judo	0	1	1
Modern pentathlon	2	0	2
Rowing	3	2	5
Sailing	3	1	4
Shooting	1	0	1
Swimming	5	2	7
Synchronized swimming	–	2	2
Taekwondo	1	2	3
Tennis	2	0	2
Volleyball	2	2	4
Weightlifting	0	1	1
Total	52	26	78

== Archery ==
In its sixth Olympic archery competition, Mexico entered two competitors. Both lost in the first round.

Men

Athlete	Event	Ranking round		Round of 64	Round of 32	Round of 16	Quarterfinal	Semifinal	Final / BM	
Athlete	Event	Score	Seed	Opposition Result	Opposition Result	Opposition Result	Opposition Result	Opposition Result	Opposition Result	Rank
Juan Carlos Manjarrez	Men's individual	628	33	Orbay (TUR); L 153–165	Did not advance					
Erika Reyes	Women's individual	597	61	Mi-Jin (KOR); L 157–168	Did not advance					

== Athletics ==
Key

- Note–Ranks given for track events are within the athlete's heat only
- Q = Qualified for the next round by position in race or, in field events, by achieving the automatic qualification target
- q = Qualified for the next round as a fastest loser or, in field events, by position without achieving the qualifying target

Men
Track and road events

Athlete	Event	Heat		Quarterfinal		Semifinal		Final	
Athlete	Event	Time	Rank	Time	Rank	Time	Rank	Time	Rank
Alejandro Cárdenas	400 m	46.14	3	45.66	6	Did not advance			
Juan Pedro Toledo	400 m	46.82	6	Did not advance					
David Galván	5.000 m	DNS		—N/a				Did not advance	
Pablo Olmedo	5.000 m	13:40.34	12	—N/a				Did not advance	
David Galván	10.000 m	27:49.53	7 Q	—N/a				27:54.56	13
Armando Quintanilla	10.000 m	28:14.54	12	—N/a				Did not advance	
Salvador Miranda	3000 m steeplechase	8:35.79	9	—N/a				Did not advance	
Noé Hernández	20 km race walk	—N/a						1:19:03	2nd place, silver medalist(s)
Daniel García	20 km race walk	—N/a						1:22:05	12
Bernardo Segura	20 km race walk	—N/a						DNS	
Joel Sánchez	50 km race walk	—N/a						3:44:36	3rd place, bronze medalist(s)
Miguel Ángel Rodríguez	50 km race walk	—N/a						3:48:12	7
Germán Sánchez	50 km race walk	—N/a						DSQ	
Andrés Espinosa	Marathon	—N/a						2:18:02	27
Benjamín Paredes	Marathon	—N/a						2:27:17	64

Field events

Athlete	Event	Qualification		Final	
Athlete	Event	Result	Rank	Result	Rank
Robison Pratt	Pole Vault	NM		Did not advance	

Women
Track and road events

Athlete	Event	Heat		Quarterfinal		Semifinal		Final	
Athlete	Event	Result	Rank	Result	Rank	Result	Rank	Result	Rank
Ana Guevara	400 m	52.34	2	51.19	2	50.11	2	49.96	5
Nora Rocha	5000 m	15:38.72	9	—N/a				Did not advance	
Dulce Maria Rodriguez	5000 m	15:54.17	11	—N/a				Did not advance	
Nora Rocha	10000 m	34:37.84	18	—N/a				Did not advance	
María Guadalupe Sánchez	20 km race walk	—N/a						1:31:33	5
Mara Ibañez	20 km race walk	—N/a						1:36:17	26
Graciela Mendoza	20 km race walk	—N/a						DSQ	
Adriana Fernández	Marathon	—N/a						2:30:51	16

== Boxing ==
Athlete	Event	Round of 32	Round of 16	Quarterfinal	Semifinal	Final	
Athlete	Event	Opposition Result	Opposition Result	Opposition Result	Opposition Result	Opposition Result	Rank
Liborio Romero	Light flyweight	Soltani (ALG); W 16–15	Stapovičius (LTU); L 11–24	Did not advance			
Daniel Ponce de León	Flyweight	Sidorenko (UKR); L 8–16	Did not advance				
César Morales	Bantamweight	Tebazalwa (UGA); W 8–13	Olteanu (ROU); L RSC	Did not advance			
Francisco Bojado	Featherweight	Shiferaw Yohanes (ETH); W RSC	Djamaloudinov (RUS); L 12–15	Did not advance			
Cristián Bejarano	Lightweight	Khunwane (BOT); W 17–5	Lungu (BUL); W 14–11	Raimkulov (KGZ); W 14–12	Kotelnyk (UKR); L 14–22	Did not advance	3rd place, bronze medalist(s)
José Luis Zertuche	Light middleweight	Sandy (GUI); W RSC	Simion (ROU); L RSC	Did not advance			

== Canoeing ==
=== Sprint ===
Athlete	Event	Heat		Semifinal		Final	
Athlete	Event	Time	Rank	Time	Rank	Time	Rank
Ramón Ferrer; José Antonio Romero	Men's C-2 500 m	1:45.927	7 QS	1:46.811	5	Did not advance	
Ramón Ferrer; José Antonio Romero	Men's C-2 1000 m	3:49.301	7 QS	3:44.358	3 QF	3:46.457	6

== Cycling ==
=== Mountain biking ===
Athlete	Event	Time	Rank
Ziranda Madrigal	Men's cross-country	2:19:33.56	24

=== Track ===
Athlete	Event	Points	Rank
Belem Guerrero Méndez	Women's points race	12	5

== Diving ==
For the first time in 12 years, Mexico won a diving medal when Fernando Platas bested his eighth-place finish in Atlanta with a silver medal.

Men

Athlete	Event	Preliminary		Semifinal				Final		Total	
Athlete	Event	Points	Rank	Points	Rank	Total	Rank	Points	Rank	Points	Rank
Fernando Platas	3 m springboard	444.60	2 Q	234.36	3	678.96	3 Q	474.06	2	708.42	2nd place, silver medalist(s)
Joel Rodriguez	3 m springboard	336.51	29	Did not advance							
Francisco Pérez	10 m platform	381.78	19	Did not advance							
Eduardo Rueda	10 m platform	60.3	42	Did not advance							
Fernando Platas; Eduardo Rueda	3 m synchronized springboard	—N/a								317.7	5

Women

Athlete	Event	Preliminary		Semifinal				Final		Total	
Athlete	Event	Points	Rank	Points	Rank	Total	Rank	Points	Rank	Points	Rank
Azul Almazan	3 m springboard	272.85	12 Q	216.03	13	488.88	13	Did not advance			
Jashia Luna	3 m springboard	268.44	15 Q	196.53	19	464.97	19	Did not advance			
María José Alcalá	10 m platform	235.53	30	Did not advance							
Azul Almazan	10 m platform	229.29	33	Did not advance							
María José Alcalá; Jashia Luna	3 m synchronized springboard	—N/a								273.84	6
María José Alcalá; Azul Almazan	10 m synchronized platform	—N/a								264.3	8

== Equestrian ==
Dressage

Athlete	Horse	Event	Grand Prix Test		Grand Prix Special			Grand Prix Freestyle		Total	
Athlete	Horse	Event	Score	Rank	Score	Total	Rank	Score	Rank	Score	Rank
Antonio Rivera	Aczydos	61.64	44	Did not advance							

Jumping

Athlete	Horse	Event	Qualification								Final				Total	
Athlete	Horse	Event	Round 1		Round 2			Round 3			Round A		Round B		Total	
Athlete	Horse	Event	Penalties	Rank	Penalties	Total	Rank	Penalties	Total	Rank	Penalties	Rank	Penalties	Rank	Penalties	Rank
Alfonso Carlos Romo	Montemorelos	Individual	9.25	30	8.00	17.25	27	12.00	29.25	=34 Q	17.50	40	did not advance			
Antonio Maurer	Mortero	Individual	12.00	=35	16.00	28.00	51	24.00	52.00	=59	did not advance					
Santiago Lambre	Taloc	Individual	14.00	=43	4.00	18.00	=32	8.00	26.00	30 Q	16.50	38	did not advance			
Alfonso Carlos Romo; Antonio Maurer; Santiago Lambre	See above	Team	—N/a		28.00	—N/a	12	did not advance							28.00	12

== Gymnastics ==
=== Artistic ===
Individual finals

Athlete	Event	Apparatus				Total	Rank
Athlete	Event	V	UB	BB	F	Total	Rank
Denisse López	Women's Vault	8.843	—N/a			8.843	7

== Judo ==
Athlete	Event	Round of 32	Round of 16	Quarterfinals	Semifinals	Repechage 1	Repechage 2	Repechage 3	Final / BM	
Athlete	Event	Opposition Result	Opposition Result	Opposition Result	Opposition Result	Opposition Result	Opposition Result	Opposition Result	Opposition Result	Rank
Adriana Angeles	Women's –48 kg	Kallio (FIN); W	Arenas (ESP); L	did not advance						

== Modern pentathlon ==
Athlete	Event	Shooting			Fencing			Swimming			Riding			Running			Total	
Athlete	Event	Score	Rank	Points	W/L	Rank	Points	Time	Rank	Points	Penalties	Rank	Points	Time	Rank	Points	Points	Rank
Samuel Félix	Men's	178	16	1048	11	16	800	2:16.31	22	1137	90	11	1010	9:17.66	3	1170	5165	11
Horacio de la Vega	Men's	179	10	1084	15	10	960	2:10.37	15	1197	DNF		0	10:50.91	24	798	4039	22

== Rowing ==
Men

Athlete	Event	Heat		Repechage		Semifinal		Final	
Athlete	Event	Time	Rank	Time	Rank	Time	Rank	Time	Rank
Jesús Huerta	Single sculls	7:29.64 R	5	7:31.93	4 QCD	7:36.06	5 QD	7:29.68	19
Rómulo Bouzas; Gerardo Gómez	Lightweight double sculls	6:31.24	6 R	6:38.07	2 QAB	6:33.62	5 QB	6:31.70	10

Women

Athlete	Event	Heat		Repechage		Semifinal		Final	
Athlete	Event	Time	Rank	Time	Rank	Time	Rank	Time	Rank
María Montoya; Ana Sofía Soberanes	Lightweight double sculls	7:36.51	5 R	7:33.58	2 QC	—N/a		7:25.00	16

== Sailing ==
Three men and one woman competed for Mexico in three events at the Sailing venue in the 2000 Sydney Olympics.

Men

Athlete	Event	Race											Net points	Rank
Athlete	Event	1	2	3	4	5	6	7	8	9	10	11	Net points	Rank
David Mier	Mistral	14	24	26	17	26	19	16	15	~~28~~	~~37~~; ~~OCS~~	27	184	25
Manuel Villarreal; Santiago Hernández	470	21	21	~~23~~	8	22	22	~~30~~; ~~DNF~~	23	9	22	11	159	23

Women

Athlete	Event	Race											Net points	Rank
Athlete	Event	1	2	3	4	5	6	7	8	9	10	11	Net points	Rank
Tania Elías Calles	Europe	19	~~23~~	8	11	7	16	2	13	~~20~~	18	14	108	17

== Shooting ==
Men

Athlete	Event	Qualification		Final		Total	
Athlete	Event	Points	Rank	Points	Rank	Points	Rank
Roberto Jose Elias Orozco	10 m air rifle	583	38	Did not advance			
Roberto Jose Elias Orozco	50 m rifle three positions	1140	39	Did not advance			
Roberto Jose Elias Orozco	50 m rifle prone	587	41	Did not advance			

== Swimming ==
Men

Athlete	Event	Heat		Semifinal		Final	
Athlete	Event	Time	Rank	Time	Rank	Time	Rank
Javier Díaz	200 m freestyle	1:53.20	30	Did not advance			
Jorge Carral Armella	400 m freestyle	3:58.34	28	—N/a		Did not advance	
Jorge Carral Armella	1500 m freestyle	15:43.03	31	—N/a		Did not advance	
Josh Ilika	100 m butterfly	55.07	33	Did not advance			
Juan Veloz	200 m butterfly	2:00.02	20	Did not advance			
Alfredo Jacobo	100 m breaststroke	1:04.67	43	Did not advance			
Javier Díaz	200 m individual medley	2:07.28	37	Did not advance			
Juan Veloz	400 m individual medley	4:31.73	38	—N/a		Did not advance	

Women

Athlete	Event	Heat		Semifinal		Final	
Athlete	Event	Time	Rank	Time	Rank	Time	Rank
Patricia Villarreal	400 m freestyle	4:21.03	32	—N/a		Did not advance	
Patricia Villarreal	800 m freestyle	8:54.79	21	—N/a		Did not advance	
Adriana Marmolejo	200 m breaststroke	02:36.93	2:36.93	Did not advance			

== Synchronized swimming ==
Athlete	Event	Qualification						Final					
Athlete	Event	Technical routine		Free routine				Technical routine		Free routine			
Athlete	Event	Points	Rank	Points	Rank	Total	Rank	Points	Rank	Points	Rank	Total	Rank
Erika Leal; Lilián Leal	Duet	35.527	9	60.234	9	92.717	9 Q	32.527	9	60.234	9	92.761	9

== Taekwondo ==
Athlete	Event	Round of 16	Quarterfinals	Semifinals	Repechage Quarterfinals	Repechage Semifinals	Final / BM	
Athlete	Event	Opposition Result	Opposition Result	Opposition Result	Opposition Result	Opposition Result	Opposition Result	Rank
Víctor Estrada	Men's −80 kg	Aflaki (IRI); W 4–3	Matos (CUB); L 0–2	Did not advance	Soto (CHI); W 6–0	Konan (CIV); W 6–4	Livaja (SWE); W 1–2	3rd place, bronze medalist(s)
Águeda Pérez	Women's −49 kg	Melendez (CUB); L 1–4	Did not advance		Thamae (LES); W 5–3	Poulsen (DEN); L 0–4	Did not advance	
Monica del Real	Women's −67 kg	Stevenson (GBR); L 4–8	Did not advance					

== Tennis ==
Men

Athlete	Event	Round of 64	Round of 32	Round of 16	Quarterfinals	Semifinals	Final / BM	
Athlete	Event	Opposition Score	Opposition Score	Opposition Score	Opposition Score	Opposition Score	Opposition Score	Rank
Enrique Abaroa; Alejandro Hernández	Doubles	—N/a	Adams (RSA) / de Jager (RSA); L 4–6, 6–7^{(4–7)}	did not advance				

== Volleyball ==
=== Beach ===
Athlete	Event	Preliminary round	Preliminary elimination		Round of 16	Quarterfinals	Semifinals	Final / BM	
Athlete	Event	Opposition Score	Opposition Score	Opposition Score	Opposition Score	Opposition Score	Opposition Score	Opposition Score	Rank
Juan Rodríguez Ibarra; Joel Sotelo	Men's	Zahner – Prosser (AUS); W 15–12 Q	Bye		Wong – Heidger Jr (USA); L 0–15	Did not advance			=9
Teresa Galindo; Hilda Gaxiola	Women's	Cook – Pottharst (AUS); L 11–15	Rong – Xiong (CHN); L 14–16	Did not advance					=19

== Weightlifting ==
Athlete	Event	Snatch			Clean & Jerk			Total	Rank
Athlete	Event	1	2	3	1	2	3	Total	Rank
Soraya Jiménez	Women's – 58 kg	90.0	92.5	95.0	117.5	122.5	127.5	222.5	1st place, gold medalist(s)
