= Taekwondo at the 2000 Summer Olympics – Women's 67 kg =

Taekwondo competition

Women's 67 kg at the Games of the XXVII Olympiad
- Venue: State Sports Centre
- Date: 29 September
- Competitors: 12 from 12 nations

Medalists
1st place, gold medalist(s)		Lee Sun-hee	South Korea
2nd place, silver medalist(s)		Trude Gundersen	Norway
3rd place, bronze medalist(s)		Yoriko Okamoto	Japan

The women's 67 kg competition in taekwondo at the 2000 Summer Olympics in Sydney took place on September 29 at the State Sports Centre.

South Korea's Lee Sun-hee had added another gold medal to her sporting squad in the final match against Norway's Trude Gundersen with a score of 6–3. Japanese fighter Yoriko Okamoto booted her stretch to prevail a tight, 6–5 victory over 17-year-old British teen Sarah Stevenson for the bronze.

== Competition format ==
The main bracket consisted of a single elimination tournament, culminating in the gold medal match. The taekwondo fighters eliminated in earlier rounds by the two finalists of the main bracket advanced directly to the repechage tournament. These matches determined the bronze medal winner for the event.

== Schedule ==
All times are Greece Standard Time (UTC+2)

Date	Time	Round
Friday, 29 September 2000	09:00; 11:30; 15:30; 20:30	Preliminary Round; Quarterfinals; Semifinals; Final

== Competitors ==
Athlete	Nation
Lee Sun-hee	South Korea
Elena Benítez	Spain
Kirsimarja Koskinen	Finland
Mirjam Mueskens	Netherlands
Lisa O'Keefe	Australia
Barbara Kunkel	United States
Trude Gundersen	Norway
Meriem Bidani	Morocco
Yoriko Okamoto	Japan
Sarah Stevenson	Great Britain
Monica del Real	Mexico
He Lumin	China

== Results ==
Legend

- PTG — Won by points gap
- SUP — Won by superiority
- OT — Won on over time (Golden Point)
- WO — Walkover

=== Main bracket ===
Preliminary round
Elena Benítez (ESP)	0
Kirsimarja Koskinen (FIN)	7
Mirjam Mueskens (NED)	8
Lisa O'Keefe (AUS)	6
Meriem Bidani (MAR)	1
Yoriko Okamoto (JPN)	4
Sarah Stevenson (GBR)	8
Monica del Real (MEX)	4

Quarterfinals
Lee Sun-hee (KOR)	5
Kirsimarja Koskinen (FIN)	1
Mirjam Mueskens (NED)	6
Barbara Kunkel (USA)	2
Trude Gundersen (NOR)	7
Yoriko Okamoto (JPN)	4
Sarah Stevenson (GBR)	6
He Lumin (CHN)	5

Semifinals
Lee Sun-hee (KOR)	4
Mirjam Mueskens (NED)	1
Trude Gundersen (NOR)	2+
Sarah Stevenson (GBR)	2

Gold medal match
Lee Sun-hee (KOR)	6
Trude Gundersen (NOR)	3

=== Repechage ===
Semifinals		Bronze medal match
Mirjam Mueskens (NED)	5
Yoriko Okamoto (JPN)	7	Yoriko Okamoto (JPN)	6
Sarah Stevenson (GBR)	7	Sarah Stevenson (GBR)	5
Kirsimarja Koskinen (FIN)	4
