= Lesotho at the 2008 Summer Olympics =

- IOC code: LES
- NOC: Lesotho National Olympic Committee
- Website: lnoc.tripod.com

in Beijing
- Competitors: 5 in 2 sports
- Flag bearer: Tsotang Maine
- Medals: Gold 0 Silver 0 Bronze 0 Total 0

Summer Olympics appearances (overview)
- 1972; 1976; 1980; 1984; 1988; 1992; 1996; 2000; 2004; 2008; 2012; 2016; 2020; 2024

Lesotho was represented at the 2008 Summer Olympics in Beijing, China by the Lesotho National Olympic Committee.

In total, five athletes including four men and one woman represented Lesotho in two different sports including athletics and boxing.

== Background ==
Lesotho made their Olympic debut at the 1972 Summer Olympics in Munich, West Germany. Although the country missed the 1976 Summer Olympics in Montreal, Quebec, Canada, they had been present at every games since the 1980 Summer Olympics in Moscow, Russian Soviet Federative Socialist Republic, Soviet Union. The 2008 Summer Olympics in Beijing, China marked their ninth appearance at the Summer Olympics.

== Competitors ==
In total, five athletes represented Lesotho at the 2008 Summer Olympics in Beijing, China across two different sports.

| Sport | Men | Women | Total |
|---|---|---|---|
| Athletics | 3 | 1 | 4 |
| Boxing | 1 | 0 | 1 |
| Total | 4 | 1 | 5 |

== Athletics ==
In total, four Basotho athletes participated in the athletics events – Moses Mosuhli, Tsotang Maine and Clement Lebopo in the men's marathon and Mamorallo Tjoka in the women's marathon.

The athletics events took place at the Beijing National Stadium in Chaoyang, Beijing from 15 to 24 August 2008.

The men's marathon took place on 24 August 2008. Neither Mosuhli, Maine nor Lebopo finished the race.

| Athlete | Event | Final | |
| Athlete | Event | Result | Rank |
|---|---|---|---|
| Moses Mosuhli | Marathon | DNF | |
| Tsotang Maine | Marathon | DNF | |
| Clement Lebopo | Marathon | DNF | |

The women's marathon took place on 17 August 2008. Tjoka did not finish the race.

Women

| Athlete | Event | Final | |
| Athlete | Event | Result | Rank |
|---|---|---|---|
| Mamorallo Tjoka | Marathon | DNF | |

== Boxing ==
In total, one Basotho athlete participated in the boxing events – Emanuel Thabiso Nketu in the bantamweight category.

The boxing events took place at the Workers' Gymnasium in Chaoyang, Beijing from 9 to 24 August 2008.

The first round in the bantamweight category took place on 12 August 2008. Nketu lost to Bruno Julie of Mauritius.

| Athlete | Event | Round of 32 | Round of 16 | Quarterfinals | Semifinals | Final | |
| Athlete | Event | Opposition Result | Opposition Result | Opposition Result | Opposition Result | Opposition Result | Rank |
|---|---|---|---|---|---|---|---|
| Emanuel Thabiso Nketu | Bantamweight | Julie (MRI); L 8–17 | Did not advance | | | | |
