= Taekwondo at the 2000 Summer Olympics – Men's 58 kg =

Taekwondo competition

Men's 58 kg at the Games of the XXVII Olympiad
- Olympic Taekwondo
- Venue: State Sports Centre
- Date: 27 September
- Competitors: 14 from 14 nations

Medalists
1st place, gold medalist(s)		Michalis Mouroutsos	Greece
2nd place, silver medalist(s)		Gabriel Esparza	Spain
3rd place, bronze medalist(s)		Huang Chih-hsiung	Chinese Taipei

The men's 58 kg competition in taekwondo at the 2000 Summer Olympics in Sydney took place on 27 September at the State Sports Centre.

Greece's Michalis Mouroutsos handily defeated the Spaniard Gabriel Esparza with a score of 4–2 to take the gold in the men's flyweight class. The bronze medal was awarded to Chinese Taipei's Huang Chih-hsiung, who overwhelmed Argentina's Gabriel Taraburelli for a 3–0 victory in the repechage.

== Competition format ==
The main bracket consisted of a single elimination tournament, culminating in the gold medal match. The taekwondo fighters eliminated in earlier rounds by the two finalists of the main bracket advanced directly to the repechage tournament. These matches determined the bronze medal winner for the event.

== Schedule ==
All times are Greece Standard Time (UTC+2)

Date	Time	Round
Wednesday, 27 September 2000	09:00; 11:30; 15:30; 20:30	Preliminary Round; Quarterfinals; Semifinals; Final

== Competitors ==
Athlete	Nation
Gabriel Taraburelli	Argentina
Gabriel Sagastume	Guatemala
Roberto Cruz	Philippines
Kiyoteru Higuchi	Japan
Huang Chih-hsiung	Chinese Taipei
Talaat Abada	Egypt
Michalis Mouroutsos	Greece
József Salim	Hungary
Juan Moreno	United States
Naser Buftain	Kuwait
Mfanukhona Dlamini	Swaziland
Paul Lyons	Australia
Younès Sekkat	Morocco
Gabriel Esparza	Spain

== Results ==
Legend

- PTG — Won by points gap
- SUP — Won by superiority
- OT — Won on over time (Golden Point)
- WO — Walkover
- RSC — Referee Stops Contest

=== Main bracket ===
Preliminary round
Gabriel Sagastume (GUA)	−1
Roberto Cruz (PHI)	4
Kiyoteru Higuchi (JPN)	0
Huang Chih-hsiung (TPE)	4
Talaat Abada (EGY)	0
Michalis Mouroutsos (GRE)	5
József Salim (HUN)	2
Juan Moreno (USA)	0
Naser Buftain (KUW)	0:00-3
Mfanukhona Dlamini (SWZ)	RSC
Paul Lyons (AUS)	4
Younès Sekkat (MAR)	4+

Quarterfinals
Gabriel Taraburelli (ARG)	7
Roberto Cruz (PHI)	5
Huang Chih-hsiung (TPE)	1
Michalis Mouroutsos (GRE)	2
József Salim (HUN)	1+
Naser Buftain (KUW)	1
Younès Sekkat (MAR)	1
Gabriel Esparza (ESP)	3

Semifinals
Gabriel Taraburelli (ARG)	1
Michalis Mouroutsos (GRE)	2
József Salim (HUN)	0
Gabriel Esparza (ESP)	5

Gold medal match
Michalis Mouroutsos (GRE)	4
Gabriel Esparza (ESP)	2

=== Repechage ===
Quarterfinals
Huang Chih-hsiung (TPE)	7
Talaat Abada (EGY)	2

Semifinals
Gabriel Taraburelli (ARG)	5
Younès Sekkat (MAR)	4
József Salim (HUN)	0
Huang Chih-hsiung (TPE)	1

Bronze medal match
Gabriel Taraburelli (ARG)	0
Huang Chih-hsiung (TPE)	3
