= Lesotho at the 2000 Summer Olympics =

- IOC code: LES
- NOC: Lesotho National Olympic Committee
- Website: lnoc.tripod.com

in Sydney
- Competitors: 6 in 3 sports
- Flag bearer: Mokete Mokhosi
- Medals: Gold 0 Silver 0 Bronze 0 Total 0

Summer Olympics appearances (overview)
- 1972; 1976; 1980; 1984; 1988; 1992; 1996; 2000; 2004; 2008; 2012; 2016; 2020; 2024

Lesotho competed at the 2000 Summer Olympics in Sydney, Australia.

== Competitors ==
The following is the list of number of competitors in the Games.

Sport	Men	Women	Total
Athletics	1	1	2
Boxing	2	–	2
Taekwondo	1	1	2
Total	4	2	6

== Athletics ==
=== Men ===
Athlete	Event	Heat		Quarterfinal		Semifinal		Final	
Athlete	Event	Result	Rank	Result	Rank	Result	Rank	Result	Rank
Thabiso Moqhali	Marathon	—						2:16:43	16

=== Women ===
Athlete	Event	Heat		Quarterfinal		Semifinal		Final	
Athlete	Event	Result	Rank	Result	Rank	Result	Rank	Result	Rank
Lineo Shoai	200 m	25.57	6	did not advance					

== Boxing ==
=== Men ===
Athlete	Event	Round of 32	Round of 16	Quarterfinals	Semifinals	Final	
Athlete	Event	Opposition Result	Opposition Result	Opposition Result	Opposition Result	Opposition Result	Rank
Sebusiso Keketsi	Light Flyweight	Un Chol Kim (PRK); L 0–5	did not advance				
Mosolesa Tsie	Welterweight	Steven Küchler (GER); L 0–5	did not advance				

== Taekwondo ==
Athlete	Event	Round of 16	Quarterfinals	Semifinals	Repechage 1	Repechage 2	Final / BM	
Athlete	Event	Opposition Result	Opposition Result	Opposition Result	Opposition Result	Opposition Result	Opposition Result	Rank
Mokete Mokhosi	Men's −80 kg	de Meo (ITA); L 3-3+	did not advance					
Likeleli Thamae	Women's −49 kg	Melendez (CUB); L 0–3	did not advance		Pérez (MEX); L 3–5	did not advance		
