= Taekwondo at the 2000 Summer Olympics – Women's 49 kg =

Taekwondo competition

Women's 49 kg at the Games of the XXVII Olympiad
- Venue: State Sports Centre
- Date: 27 September
- Competitors: 12 from 12 nations

Medalists
1st place, gold medalist(s)		Lauren Burns	Australia
2nd place, silver medalist(s)		Urbia Melendez	Cuba
3rd place, bronze medalist(s)		Chi Shu-ju	Chinese Taipei

The women's 49 kg competition in taekwondo at the 2000 Summer Olympics in Sydney took place on September 27 at the State Sports Centre.

26-year-old Lauren Burns thrilled the Aussie home crowd inside the venue, as she crushed Cuban fighter Urbia Melendez 4–2 to earn the women's flyweight title on the first day of the sport's major Olympic debut. Meanwhile, Chinese Taipei's Chi Shu-ju prevailed a bronze medal victory over Denmark's Hanne Høgh Poulsen with a score of 4–0.

== Competition format ==
The main bracket consisted of a single elimination tournament, culminating in the gold medal match. The taekwondo fighters eliminated in earlier rounds by the two finalists of the main bracket advanced directly to the repechage tournament. These matches determined the bronze medal winner for the event.

== Schedule ==
All times are Greece Standard Time (UTC+2)

Date	Time	Round
Wednesday, 27 September 2000	09:00; 11:30; 15:30; 20:30	Preliminary Round; Quarterfinals; Semifinals; Final

== Competitors ==
Athlete	Nation
Nguyen Thi Xuan Mai	Vietnam
Döndü Güvenc	Turkey
Eva Marie Ditan	Philippines
Águeda Pérez	Mexico
Urbia Melendez	Cuba
Likeleli Thamae	Lesotho
Juana Wangsa Putri	Indonesia
Hanne Høgh Poulsen	Denmark
Kay Poe	United States
Fadime Helvacioglu	Germany
Chi Shu-ju	Chinese Taipei
Lauren Burns	Australia

== Results ==
Legend

- PTG — Won by points gap
- SUP — Won by superiority
- OT — Won on over time (Golden Point)
- WO — Walkover

=== Main bracket ===
Preliminary round
Döndü Güvenc (TUR)	6
Eva Marie Ditan (PHI)	1
Águeda Pérez (MEX)	1
Urbia Melendez (CUB)	4
Hanne Høgh Poulsen (DEN)	4
Kay Poe (USA)	3
Fadime Helvacioglu (GER)	0
Chi Shu-ju (TPE)	1

Quarterfinals
Nguyen Thi Xuan Mai (VIE)	1
Döndü Güvenc (TUR)	2
Urbia Melendez (CUB)	3
Likeleli Thamae (LES)	0
Juana Wangsa Putri (INA)	2
Hanne Høgh Poulsen (DEN)	7
Chi Shu-ju (TPE)	3
Lauren Burns (AUS)	3+

Semifinals
Döndü Güvenc (TUR)	1
Urbia Melendez (CUB)	3
Hanne Høgh Poulsen (DEN)	0
Lauren Burns (AUS)	1

Gold medal match
Urbia Melendez (CUB)	2
Lauren Burns (AUS)	4

=== Repechage ===
Quarterfinals
Likeleli Thamae (LES)	3
Águeda Pérez (MEX)	5

Semifinals
Döndü Güvenc (TUR)	0
Chi Shu-ju (TPE)	3
Hanne Høgh Poulsen (DEN)	2
Águeda Pérez (MEX)	1

Bronze medal match
Chi Shu-ju (TPE)	4
Hanne Høgh Poulsen (DEN)	0
