= Lesotho at the Olympics =

- IOC code: LES
- NOC: Lesotho National Olympic Committee
- Website: lnoc.org.ls
- Medals: Gold 0 Silver 0 Bronze 0 Total 0

Summer appearances
- 1972; 1976; 1980; 1984; 1988; 1992; 1996; 2000; 2004; 2008; 2012; 2016; 2020; 2024; 2028

Lesotho first participated at the Olympic Games in 1972 and has sent athletes to compete in every Summer Olympic Games since then, except when they boycotted the 1976 Summer Olympics along with most other African nations. Lesotho has never participated in the Winter Olympic Games.

To date, no athlete from Lesotho has ever won an Olympic medal. The best finish by the NOC is 7th, achieved by two athletes: taekwondo athlete Likeleli Alinah Thamae at the women's flyweight event at the 2000 Games, and by marathoner Tebello Ramakongoana at the men's event at the 2024 Games.

The National Olympic Committee for Lesotho was created in 1971 and recognized by the International Olympic Committee in 1972.

== Medal tables ==
=== Medals by Summer Games ===
Games	Athletes	Gold	Silver	Bronze	Total	Rank
1972 Munich	1	0	0	0	0	–
1976 Montreal	boycotted					
1980 Moscow	6	0	0	0	0	–
1984 Los Angeles	4	0	0	0	0	–
1988 Seoul	6	0	0	0	0	–
1992 Barcelona	6	0	0	0	0	–
1996 Atlanta	9	0	0	0	0	–
2000 Sydney	6	0	0	0	0	–
2004 Athens	3	0	0	0	0	–
2008 Beijing	5	0	0	0	0	–
2012 London	4	0	0	0	0	–
2016 Rio de Janeiro	8	0	0	0	0	–
2020 Tokyo	2	0	0	0	0	–
2024 Paris	3	0	0	0	0	–
2028 Los Angeles	future event					
2032 Brisbane	future event					
Total		0	0	0	0	–

== Flag bearers ==
This is a list of flag bearers who have represented Lesotho at the Olympics.

#	Event year	Season	Flag bearer	Sport
1	1972	Summer	Motsapi Moorosi	Athletics
2	1984	Summer	Mochochonono Mokhutlole	Chef de mission
3	1988	Summer	Noheku Nteso	Athletics
4	1996	Summer	Jessie Mathunta	Chef de mission
5	2000	Summer	Mokete Mokhosi	Taekwondo
6	2004	Summer	Lineo Mochesane	Taekwondo
7	2008	Summer	Simon Maine	Athletics
8	2012	Summer	Mamorallo Tjoka	Athletics
9	2016	Summer	Mosito Lehata	Athletics
10	2020	Summer	None/Olympic representative	
11	2024	Summer	Tebello Ramakongoana	Athletics
11	2024	Summer	Michelle Tau	Taekwondo

== See also ==
- Category:Olympic competitors for Lesotho
- Lesotho at the Paralympics
