= Lesotho at the 2020 Summer Olympics =

- IOC code: LES
- NOC: Lesotho National Olympic Committee

in Tokyo, Japan July 23, 2021 – August 8, 2021
- Competitors: 2 (1 man and 1 woman) in 1 sport
- Flag bearer (opening): TOCOG volunteer
- Flag bearer (closing): Neheng Khatala
- Medals: Gold 0 Silver 0 Bronze 0 Total 0

Summer Olympics appearances (overview)
- 1972; 1976; 1980; 1984; 1988; 1992; 1996; 2000; 2004; 2008; 2012; 2016; 2020; 2024

Lesotho competed at the 2020 Summer Olympics in Tokyo. Originally scheduled to take place from 24 July to 9 August 2020, the Games were postponed to 23 July to 8 August 2021, because of the COVID-19 pandemic. It was the nation's twelfth appearance at the Summer Olympics, with the exception of the 1976 Summer Olympics in Montreal, because of its partial support to the African boycott. The delegation included two track and field athletes; Khoarahlane Seutloali and Neheng Khatala. Both qualified for the Games by meeting qualification standards. The country was represented by a TOCOG volunteer as the flag bearer with both athletes following for the opening ceremony while Khatala held it at the closing ceremony. Lesotho, however, has yet to win its first ever Olympic medal.

== Background ==
The Lesotho National Olympic Committee was recognized by the International Olympic Committee on 1 January 1972. The 2020 Summer Olympics in Tokyo were their twelfth appearance in Olympic competition; they have participated in every Summer Olympic Games since the 1972 Summer Olympics except for the 1976 Montreal Games. The nation has yet to make its debut at the Winter Olympic Games, and they have never won an Olympic medal. The 2020 Summer Olympics were originally scheduled to take place from 24 July to 9 August 2020, but the Games were postponed to 23 July to 8 August 2021, because of the COVID-19 pandemic.

== Athletics ==
Khoarahlane Seutloali and Neheng Khatala competed in the men's and women's marathon events, respectively. Both qualified for the games by meeting the World Athletics entry standard times for the 2020 Olympics. Seutloali qualified by finishing in 2 hours 11 minutes and 4 seconds at the 2019 Sanlam Cape Town Marathon, just 24 seconds ahead of the entry standard time for the men's marathon event. The women's marathon had an entry time of 2 hours 29 minutes and 30 seconds. Khatala was able to meet this time by finishing in 2 hours 28 minutes and 6 seconds at the Retail Capital Langa Marathon Challenge on 30 May 2021 held in Cape Town, South Africa.

Khatala and Seutloali are married and long-term training partners. The Olympic Solidarity scholarship program of the 2017-2020 cycle partially funded their preparation for the Games. After the Olympics were postponed, the International Olympic Committee extended these scholarships until August 2021 so that the athletes would be able to continue training despite the one-year delay. During their preparation for the games, they received sponsorship from Storm Mountain Diamonds (SMD) Kao Mine. The sponsorship, which began in 2021, helped the duo with training costs and logistics leading up to the games. In 2022, the company renewed a specialized sponsorship of M 200,000 to Seutloali to help him on his way to the 2024 Olympics in Paris. This was observed to be a major move in the sporting scene in Lesotho since it was the first time a local mining company sponsored a professional athlete this way.

The marathon event was initially scheduled to take place in Tokyo but was later moved north, to Sapporo, due to heat concerns. Seutloali ran in the men's marathon event that took place on 8 August 2021. He finished 66th with a time of 2 hours 25 minutes and 3 seconds out of 75 athletes that finished the race. (Note: 30 athletes did not finish. One athlete was later disqualified.) The event was won by Eliud Kipchoge of Kenya. Khatala competed at the women's marathon that took place on 7 August 2021. She finished 20th with a time of 2 hours 33 minutes and 15 seconds. The event was won by Kenya's Peres Jepchirchir who finished with a time of 2 hours 27 minutes and 20 seconds.

The Ministry of Gender, Youth, Sports, and Recreation of the government of Lesotho rewarded the athletes financially because of their performances in Tokyo. In April 2022, the Ministry presented a total of M 130,000 (Lesotho Loti) to the best Olympic and Paralympics athletes in the country. Neheng Khatala and Khoarahlane Seutloali were both awarded M 50,000 as a token of appreciation of their performance in the marathon. In the award ceremony, the Ministry noted that these funds were a late delivery on a promise made soon after the Games to reward the athletes that competed in the challenging conditions created by the COVID-19 pandemic.

Key

- Note–Ranks given for track events are within the athlete's heat only
- Q = Qualified for the next round
- q = Qualified for the next round as a fastest loser or, in field events, by position without achieving the qualifying target
- NR = National record
- N/A = Round not applicable for the event
- Bye = Athlete not required to compete in round

Track & road events

Athlete	Event	Final	
Athlete	Event	Result	Rank
Khoarahlane Seutloali	Men's marathon	2:25:03 SB	67
Neheng Khatala	Women's marathon	2:33:15	20

== See also ==
- Lesotho at the 2019 African Games
