= Soweto Marathon =

- Date: November
- Location: Soweto, South Africa
- Event type: Road
- Distance: Marathon (42 km)
- Primary sponsor: African Bank
- Established: 1991; 35 years ago
- Course records: Men: 2:16:28 (2012) Shadrack Kipchirchir; Women: 2:33:43 (2018) Irvette van Zyl
- Website: sowetomarathon.com

The African Bank Soweto Marathon is a 42 kilometres (26 mi) marathon long-distance run held annually in Soweto, South Africa. Nicknamed The People's Race, its distances include a marathon, 21K half marathon, and 10K run starting at Nasrec Expo Centre and finishing at FNB Stadium.

== Winners ==
=== Men ===
Key: Current course record

Year	Winner	Time	Country
2025	Khoarahlane Seutloali	2:20:10	Lesotho
2024	Onalenna Khonkhobe	2:18:36	South Africa
2023	Ntsindiso Mphakathi	2:19:13	South Africa
2022	Daba Ifa Debele	2:18:58	Ethiopia
—	cancelled in 2020 and 2021 due to COVID-19 pandemic		
2019	Debeko Dakamo Dasa	2:18:35	Ethiopia
2018	Sintayehu Legese Yinesu (4)	2:19:10	Ethiopia
2017	Tsepo Mathibele	2:19:41	Lesotho
2016	Sintayehu Legese Yinesu (3)	2:20:44	Ethiopia
2015	Sintayehu Legese Yinesu (2)	2:23:20	Ethiopia
2014	Sintayehu Legese Yinesu	2:17:55	Ethiopia
—	cancelled in 2013		
2012	Shadrack Kipchirchir	2:16:28	Kenya
2011	Michael Mazibuko	2:19:04	South Africa
2010	Lebenya Nkoko	2:19:44	Lesotho
2009	Tsidiso Bosiu	2:18:10	South Africa
2008	Moses Mosuhli	2:19:34	Lesotho
2007	Teboho Sello	2:18:51	Lesotho
2006	Mabuthile Lebopo (2)	2:19:10	Lesotho
2005	Simon Tsotang	2:20:15	Lesotho
2004	Mabuthile Lebopo	2:18:05	Lesotho
2003	Elijah Mutandiro (2)	2:17:19	Zimbabwe
2002	Elijah Mutandiro	2:19:43	Zimbabwe
2001	Mluleki Nobanda	2:19:17	South Africa
2000	Honest Mutsakani	2:18:28	Zimbabwe
1999	Joshua Peterson (2)	2:18:18	South Africa
1998	Joshua Peterson	2:19:17	South Africa
1997	Abel Mokibe (2)	2:18:42	South Africa
1996	Abel Mokibe	2:19:58	South Africa
1995	Zithulele Sinqe	2:18:03	South Africa
1994	Jan Tau	2:19:12	South Africa
1993	Matthews Temane	2:22:01	South Africa
—	not held		
1991	Jerry Modiga	-	South Africa

=== Women ===
Key: Current course record

Year	Winner	Time	Country
2025	Margaret Jepchumba	2:34:33	Kenya
2024	Neheng Khatala	2:43:07	Lesotho
2023	Irvette van Zyl (4)	2:34:16	South Africa
2022	Chaltu Bedo	2:40:56	Ethiopia
—	cancelled in 2020 and 2021 due to COVID-19 pandemic		
2019	Irvette van Zyl (3)	2:34:01	South Africa
2018	Irvette van Zyl (2)	2:33:43	South Africa
2017	Irvette van Zyl	2:4106	South Africa
2016	Selam Abere	2:42:32	Ethiopia
2015	Harriet Chebore	2:49:52	Kenya
2014	Meseret Mengistu	2:36:02	Ethiopia
—	cancelled in 2013		
2012	Mamorallo Tjoka (7)	2:45:20	Lesotho
2011	Mamorallo Tjoka (6)	2:43:40	Lesotho
2010	Mamorallo Tjoka (5)	2:48:36	Lesotho
2009	Rene Kalmer	2:44:06	South Africa
2008	Mamorallo Tjoka (4)	2:53:48	Lesotho
2007	Mamorallo Tjoka (3)	2:47:57	Lesotho
2006	Mamorallo Tjoka (2)	2:47:00	Lesotho
2005	Mamorallo Tjoka	2:49:45	Lesotho
2004	Charne Rademeyer (2)	2:48:32	South Africa
2003	Charne Rademeyer	2:44:53	South Africa
2002	Farwah Mentoor	2:50:33	South Africa
2001	Gwen van Lingen	2:45:37	South Africa
2000	Sarah Mahlangu (4)	2:56:47	South Africa
1999	Sarah Mahlangu (3)	2:49:49	South Africa
1998	Angelina Sephooa	2:49:55	Lesotho
1997	Sarah Mahlangu (2)	2:45:48	South Africa
1996	Sarah Mahlangu	2:56:53	South Africa
1995	Jowaine Parrott	2:50:17	South Africa
1994	Helen Joubert (2)	2:53:14	South Africa
1993	Helen Joubert	2:57:28	South Africa

== Sponsorship ==
The marathon is sponsored by African Bank.

== Financial mismanagement ==
As of May 2026, athletes had not received any prize money for the November 2025 marathon. Sports minister Gayton McKenzie stated that the department would be opening a criminal case against the organisers.
