= Taekwondo at the 2000 Summer Olympics – Men's 80 kg =

Taekwondo competition

Men's 80 kg at the Games of the XXVII Olympiad
- Venue: State Sports Centre
- Date: 29 September
- Competitors: 14 from 14 nations

Medalists
1st place, gold medalist(s)		Ángel Matos	Cuba
2nd place, silver medalist(s)		Faissal Ebnoutalib	Germany
3rd place, bronze medalist(s)		Víctor Estrada	Mexico

The men's 80 kg competition in taekwondo at the 2000 Summer Olympics in Sydney took place on 29 September at the State Sports Centre.

Cuban fighter Ángel Matos overcame his mother's death to defeat Germany's Faissal Ebnoutalib 3–1 for the gold medal in the men's welterweight class. Meanwhile, Mexico's Victor Estrada handily defeated Sweden's Roman Livaja in a tight match 2–1 to pick up the bronze.

== Competition format ==
The main bracket consisted of a single elimination tournament, culminating in the gold medal match. The taekwondo fighters eliminated in earlier rounds by the two finalists of the main bracket advanced directly to the repechage tournament. These matches determined the bronze medal winner for the event.

== Schedule ==
All times are Greece Standard Time (UTC+2)

Date	Time	Round
Friday, 29 September 2000	09:00; 11:30; 15:30; 20:30	Preliminary Round; Quarterfinals; Semifinals; Final

== Competitors ==
Athlete	Nation
Marcel More	Slovenia
Donald Geisler	Philippines
Roman Livaja	Sweden
Félipe Soto	Chile
Ángel Matos	Cuba
Majid Aflaki	Iran
Victor Estrada	Mexico
Mohamed Al-Fararjeh	Jordan
Faissal Ebnoutalib	Germany
Muhammed Dahmani	Denmark
Warren Hansen	Australia
Mokete Mokhosi	Lesotho
Mario de Meo	Italy
Sebastien Konan	Ivory Coast

== Results ==
Legend

- PTG — Won by points gap
- SUP — Won by superiority
- OT — Won on over time (Golden Point)
- WO — Walkover

=== Main bracket ===
Preliminary round
Donald Geisler (PHI)	4
Roman Livaja (SWE)	4+
Félipe Soto (CHI)	2
Ángel Matos (CUB)	9
Majid Aflaki (IRI)	3
Víctor Estrada (MEX)	4
Mohamed Al-Fararjeh (JOR)	2
Faissal Ebnoutalib (GER)	8
Muhammed Dahmani (DEN)	5
Warren Hansen (AUS)	6
Mokete Mokhosi (LES)	3
Mario De Meo (ITA)	3+

Quarterfinals
Marcel More (SLO)	2
Roman Livaja (SWE)	4
Ángel Matos (CUB)	2
Víctor Estrada (MEX)	0
Faissal Ebnoutalib (GER)	2
Warren Hansen (AUS)	1
Mario de Meo (ITA)	3
Sebastien Konan (CIV)	4

Semifinals
Roman Livaja (SWE)	0
Ángel Matos (CUB)	4
Faissal Ebnoutalib (GER)	4
Sebastien Konan (CIV)	3

Gold medal match
Ángel Matos (CUB)	3
Faissal Ebnoutalib (GER)	1

=== Repechage ===
Quarterfinals
Warren Hansen (AUS)	5
Mohamed Al-Fararjeh (JOR)	4
Víctor Estrada (MEX)	6
Félipe Soto (CHI)	1

Semifinals
Roman Livaja (SWE)	1
Warren Hansen (AUS)	0
Sebastien Konan (CIV)	4
Víctor Estrada (MEX)	6

Bronze medal match
Roman Livaja (SWE)	1
Víctor Estrada (MEX)	2
