= Ángel Matos =

Cuban taekwondo practitioner

Personal information
- Born: December 24, 1976 (age 49) Holguín, Cuba

Sport
- Sport: Taekwondo
Medal record
Men's taekwondo
Representing Cuba
Olympic Games
Gold medal – first place	2000 Sydney	80 kg
Pan American Games
Gold medal – first place	2007 Rio de Janeiro	80 kg
Silver medal – second place	1999 Winnipeg	80 kg

Ángel Valodia Matos Fuentes (born December 24, 1976) is a former Cuban taekwondo athlete. He received a gold medal at the 2000 Summer Olympics in Sydney, and added another at the 2007 Pan American Games in Rio de Janeiro.

The World Taekwondo Federation banned Matos and his coach for life following an incident at the 2008 Summer Olympics where Matos kicked the Swedish referee Chakir Chelbat in the face, after being disqualified in the bronze medal match. The decision was later ratified by the IOC. He was also banned for life by the same committee.

== 2000 Summer Olympics ==
At the 2000 Summer Olympics, Matos was gold medalist in the men's middleweight (80 kg) class. In the first round, he defeated Felipe Soto Alvarez of Chile 9–2. In the quarterfinals, he defeated Victor Manuel Estrada Garibay of Mexico 2–0, besting Swede Roman Livaja in the semifinals, 4–0. In the gold medal match Matos defeated Germany's Faissal Ebnoutalib 3–1.

== 2004 Summer Olympics ==
Matos was the defending Olympic welterweight champion. At the 2003 Pan American Games, Matos was defeated 4–1 by eventual gold medalist Steven López. He was not a medalist at Athens in 2004, being ousted by Mexican Estrada 8–7, in the preliminary round of 16.

== 2008 Summer Olympics ==
In the bronze medal match in the men's 80+ kg class at the 2008 Summer Olympics, Matos was set against Kazakhstan's Arman Chilmanov. After he incurred a foot injury (at which point he led the match 3–2), he took a Kyeshi ("suspend", medical timeout). Under World Taekwondo Federation tournament rules, players sustaining injury are allowed one minute of Kyeshi time, at the end of which the competitor in question must return to the center of the ring to resume the fight, request further time, or forfeit the match.

Swedish referee Chakir Chelbat gave a time warning at 40 seconds, but Kyeshi elapsed without Matos returning to the center. The referee ruled while he was sitting awaiting medical attention that he had taken too long during his time out and subsequently ruled he had retired. "To me it was obvious he was unable to continue," his opponent Arman Chilmanov of Kazakhstan said. "His toe on his left foot was broken." After Chilmanov was declared the winner, Matos briefly argued with Chelbat and then kicked him in the face, punched a judge in the arm, and spat on the floor of the arena before being escorted out by security with his coach, Leudis Gonzalez.

After the fight, Yang Jin-suk, the secretary general of the World Taekwondo Federation, apologised and said "This is an insult to the Olympic vision, an insult to the spirit of taekwondo and, in my opinion, an insult to mankind."

Hours later, the WTF banned Matos and González from WTF-sanctioned events for life; in a statement announcing its decision, the WTF called Matos' behaviour "a strong violation of the spirit of taekwondo and the Olympic Games." It also deleted Matos' results from the 2008 Olympics from the records.

Matos's coach Leudis González said of the referee's initial decision to end the fight, "He was too strict..." and accused the Kazakhstan team of offering bribes. Former Cuban president Fidel Castro also defended Matos, saying he was rightfully indignant over his disqualification. "I saw when the judges blatantly stole fights from two Cuban boxers in the semifinals," Castro wrote.

== Subsequent activities ==
In a 2018 interview with the Havana Times, Matos expressed his regret at his actions at the 2008 Summer Olympics, stating that he had wished to continue his taekwondo career at least until the next year's World Championships. However, Matos still believes that it was judge's unfair decision that cost him a fight. At the time of this interview, Matos worked as a trainer at a Havana gym.
