= Döndü Güvenç =

Turkish taekwondo practitioner (born 1978)

Personal information
- Born: 6 April 1978 (age 48)

Sport
- Country: Turkey
- Sport: Taekwondo

Döndü Güvenç (born 6 April 1978) is a Turkish taekwondo practitioner. She competed in the semifinals of the 2000 Summer Olympics's Women's 49 kg category and won a total of two gold, three silver and two bronze medals in international events.

== Career ==
During the 1996 Balkan Championships, Güvenç secured a bronze medal. Two years later, she won the silver medal in 1998 European Taekwondo Championships's women's flyweight event and another bronze in Taekwondo World Cup. After securing the second position at the 1999 Taekwondo qualifiers for the 2000 Summer Olympics to be held in Sydney, Güvenç went on to represent Turkey in Olympic's Women's 49 kg event and finished in the fifth position. She advanced till the semifinals, where she lost to Cuba's Urbia Melendez and in the repêchage round Chi Shu-ju of Taiwan defeated her. She obtained another silver at the Taekwondo World Cup organised in the same year.

Güvenç won gold medals in 51 kg category at the 2002 European Championship and 2003 German Open. She has been coached by Fahrettin Yildiz.
