= Lesotho at the 2024 Summer Olympics =

- Flag of Lesotho
- IOC code: LES
- NOC: Lesotho National Olympic Committee

in Paris, France 26 July 2024 – 11 August 2024
- Competitors: 3 (1 man and 2 women) in 2 sports
- Flag bearers: Tebello Ramakongoana & Michelle Tau
- Medals: Gold 0 Silver 0 Bronze 0 Total 0

Summer Olympics appearances (overview)
- 1972; 1976; 1980; 1984; 1988; 1992; 1996; 2000; 2004; 2008; 2012; 2016; 2020; 2024

Lesotho competed at the 2024 Summer Olympics in Paris, which took place from 26 July to 11 August 2024. It was the nation's thirteenth appearance at the Summer Olympics since its debut in 1972. The delegation consisted of three athletes competing in two sports, Tebello Ramakongoana and Mokulubete Blandina Makatisi in athletics, and Michelle Tau in taekwondo. Lesotho did not win any medals at the Paris Olympics. Ramakongoana and Tau served as the team's flagbearers in the 2024 opening ceremony, while Ramakongoana and Makatisi were the flagbearers for the closing ceremony. The best performance was that of Ramakongoana, who placed seventh in the men's marathon and set a national record.

== Background ==
The Paris Olympics was the nation's thirteenth appearance in Olympic competition. They have participated in every Summer Olympic Games since the 1972 Summer Olympics except the 1976 Montreal Games. The 2024 Summer Olympics were held from 26 July to 11 August 2024. Before the Games, each Lesotho athlete was given 50,000 maloti as a reward for their participation.

== Competitors and flagbearers ==
Lesotho sent three athletes to Paris. Tebello Ramakongoana and Tau were chosen as the flagbearers for the opening ceremony, and Ramakongoana and Mokulubete Blandina Makatisi held the flag at the closing ceremony.

Sport	Men	Women	Total
Athletics	1	1	2
Taekwondo	0	1	1
Total	1	2	3

== Athletics ==
Lesotho was represented by one male and one female athlete in athletics: Ramakongoana and Makatisi in the men's and women's marathons, respectively. Ramakongoana qualified via running a time of 2:09:57 in the marathon at the 2023 World Athletics Championships in Budapest. This was enough to place him in the qualification standard of the top five. On 10 August 2024, he ran a 2:07:58 Olympic marathon, which beat the Basotho national record and placed him 7th. He was in 60th place at the 5 km (3.1 mi) mark and 70th at 10 km (6.2 mi). He then sped up and was in third place by 15 km (9.3 mi). At halfway (21 km, 13 mi), he was in 14th place. This was the all-time best performance of any Olympian from the nation. He was competing with an injured hamstring.

Makatisi received a universality selection to participate at the 2024 Summer Olympics, as she was one of three representatives of her country. Her selection sparked a dispute as the Lesotho National Olympic Committee approved her as the selection, but the Federation of Athletics Lesotho (FAL) believed Neheng Khatala was more qualified and abruptly sent Makatisi a letter stating that her Olympic appearance had been canceled. However, ultimately, Makatisi was selected to compete, being approved by World Athletics (WA). At the Olympics, she placed 31st in the women's marathon with a time of 2:30:20. Her placement improved from 57th to 54th between the 5 km (3.1 mi) and 15 km (9.3 mi) marks. She had pulled ahead to 38th by the halfway point. At the 40 km (25 mi) mark, she was in 27th place.

Athlete	Event	Final	
Athlete	Event	Result	Rank
Tebello Ramakongoana	Men's marathon	2:07:58 NR	7
Mokulubete Blandina Makatisi	Women's marathon	2:30:20 PB	31

== Taekwondo ==
Lesotho was represented by one female athlete in taekwondo: Tau in the women's −49 kg event. She qualified via the 2024 African Taekwondo Olympic Qualification Tournament in Dakar, Senegal. On 7 August, she competed in the Round of 16 against 19-year-old Mobina Nematzadeh who was 3 kg (6.6 lb) heavier than her. She lost 0–3 in the first match and 0–2 in the second, being eliminated from the competition.

Athlete	Event	Round of 16	Quarterfinals	Semifinals	Repechage	Final / BM	
Athlete	Event	Opposition Result	Opposition Result	Opposition Result	Opposition Result	Opposition Result	Rank
Michelle Tau	Women's −49 kg	Nematzadeh (IRI); L 0–3, 0–2	Did not advance				

== Aftermath ==
The three Olympians returned to Lesotho on 13 August, being welcomed by Motlatsi Maqelepo, the Minister of Sports, at Moshoeshoe I International Airport. On a tour around Africa, President of the International Olympic Committee, visited Lesotho and its Olympians for two days, praising their "outstanding performance". This visit lasted from the 22 to the 23 October 2024.
