= Livaja =

Livaja is a surname. Notable people with the surname include:

- Marko Livaja (born 1993), Croatian football player
- Roman Livaja (born 1974), Swedish taekwondo practitioner
