= Ebnoutalib =

Ebnoutalib is a Moroccan surname. Notable people with the surname include:

- Faissal Ebnoutalib (born 1970), German taekwondo practitioner
- Younes Ebnoutalib (born 2003), German footballer
