= Lesotho at the 2012 Summer Olympics =

- IOC code: LES
- NOC: Lesotho National Olympic Committee
- Website: lnoc.tripod.com

in London
- Competitors: 4 in 2 sports
- Flag bearers: Mamorallo Tjoka (opening); Mosito Lehata (closing)
- Medals: Gold 0 Silver 0 Bronze 0 Total 0

Summer Olympics appearances (overview)
- 1972; 1976; 1980; 1984; 1988; 1992; 1996; 2000; 2004; 2008; 2012; 2016; 2020; 2024

Lesotho competed at the 2012 Summer Olympics in London, which was held from 27 July to 12 August 2012. The country's participation at London marked its tenth appearance in the Summer Olympics since its début at the 1972 Summer Olympics. The delegation included three track and field athletes; Tsepo Ramonene, Mosito Lehata and Mamorallo Tjoka, and one swimmer; Masempe Theko. Ramonene and Lehata qualified for the Games by meeting qualification standards, while Tjoka and Theko made the Olympics through wildcard places. Tjoka was selected as the flag bearer for the opening ceremony while Lehata held it at the closing ceremony. Ramonene finished last in the men's marathon and was revived by medical personnel during the event. Lehata did not progress to the semi-finals of the men's 200 metres and Tjoka finished in 90th in the women's marathon. Theko finished 73rd (and last) overall in the women's 50 metre freestyle and did not progress to the semi-finals of the event.

== Background ==
Lesotho participated in ten Summer Olympic Games between its début at the 1972 Summer Olympics in Munich, West Germany and the 2012 Summer Olympics in London, England, with the exception of the 1976 Summer Olympics in Montreal, because of a boycott relating to the New Zealand national rugby union team touring South Africa. No Mosothoan athlete has ever won a medal at the Olympic Games and the nation has not entered the Winter Olympic Games. Lesotho participated in the London Summer Olympics from 27 July to 12 August 2012.

In April 2009 the Lesotho National Olympic Committee (NOC) began preparations for the London Olympic Games by inviting 23 of the country's member federations to a workshop to discuss the issue on sending a larger team. The delegation to London consisted of athletes Tsepo Ramonene, Mosito Lehata, Mamorallo Tjoka and swimmer Masempe Theko. Tjoka was the flag bearer for the opening ceremony and Lehata held it at the closing ceremony. The team trained in the North Wales town of Wrexham.

== Athletics ==
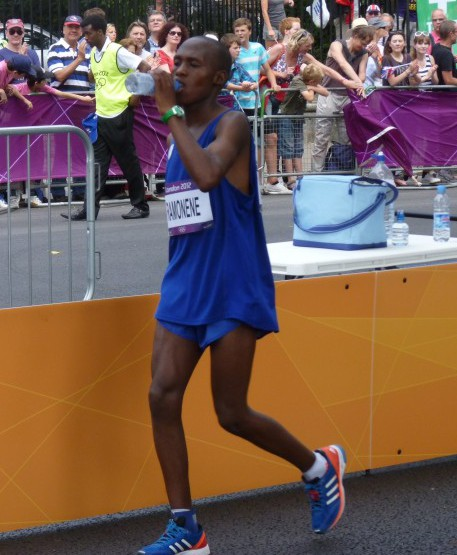
Tsepo Ramonene after finishing the men's marathon in 85th (and last) position.

The 2012 Summer Olympics marked Tsepo Ramonene's début. He qualified for the Games because his fastest time, two hours, 16 minutes and 36 seconds set in the 2012 Steinmetz Gaborone Marathon, met the "B" standard qualifying time for the men's marathon. Ramonene said that he was happy to participate in the event because he wanted to win a medal for Lesotho. He competed in the men's marathon on 12 August, finishing 85th (and last) of all finishers, (Note: Twenty athletes did not finish.) with a time of two hours, 55 minutes and 54 seconds. Ramonene stopped several times on his run, and reduced his pace when approaching The Mall and medical personnel were required to revive him. Ramonene was the slowest Olympic men's marathon runner since the 2000 Sydney Games. In an interview with NBC Sports in 2016, he said he was not tempted to use the bailout bus, but that cheers from the crowd encouraged him to complete the race.

Competing in his first Olympics, Mosito Lehata was notable for carrying the flag of Lesotho in the closing ceremony. He qualified for the Games because his fastest time, 20:63 seconds set in the 2012 African Championships in Athletics, met the "B" standard qualifying time for the men's 200 metres. The International Association of Athletics Federations applied a rule where any competitor observed jumping the start would be disqualified. A spokesperson for the Lesotho Amateur Athletics Association noted that Lehata had previously jump started races in his career but did not expect him to violate the rule at the Olympics because of the athlete's slow reaction time. Lehata competed in the fourth heat of the men's 200 metres on 7 August, finishing seventh (and last) of all competitors, with a time of 20.74 seconds. Overall he finished 33rd out of 53 runners, (Note: One athlete, Alonso Edward, was disqualified, and another Ben Youssef Meité did not start.) and was unable to progress to the semi-finals because his time was 0.24 seconds behind the slowest qualifier.

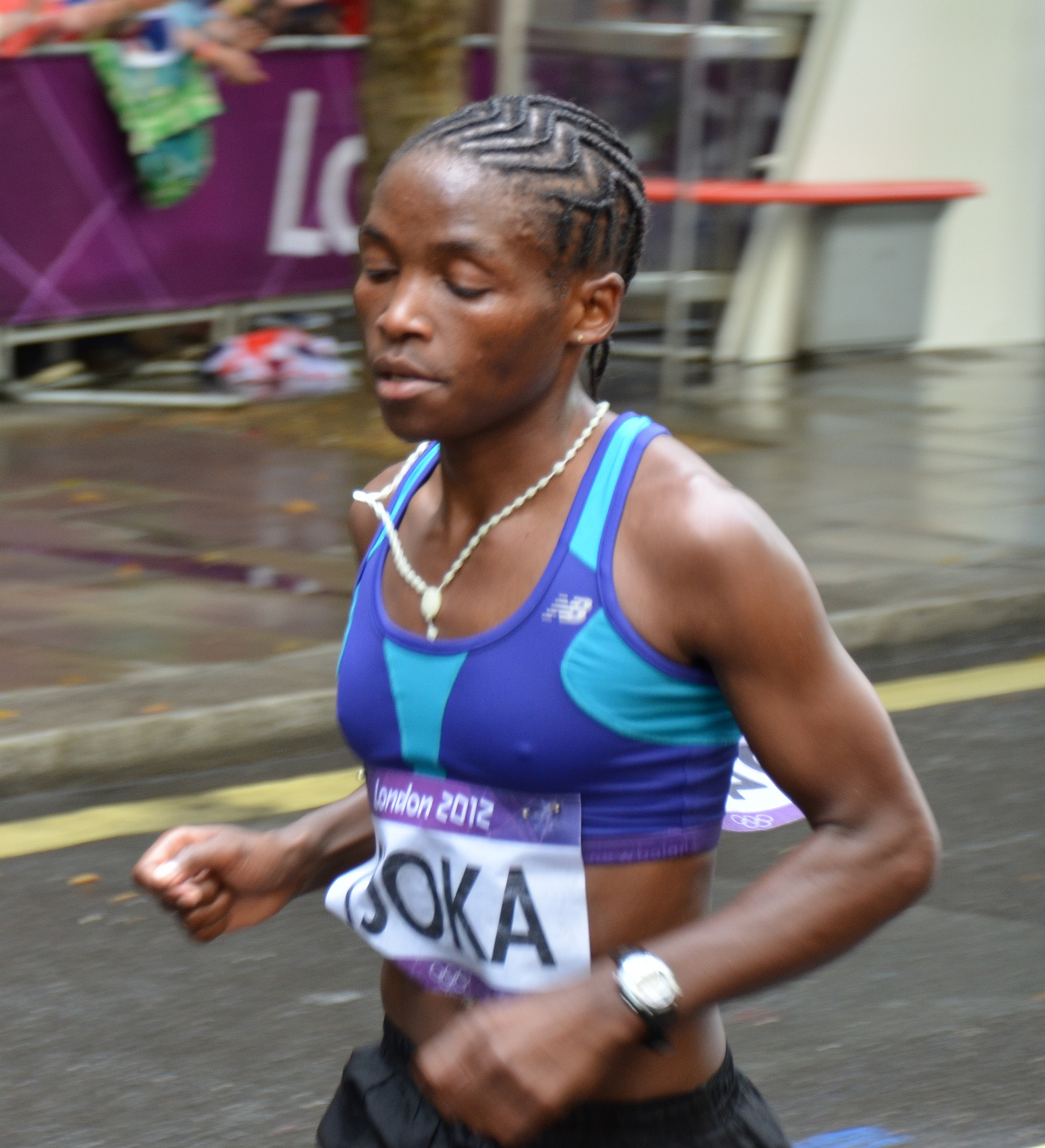
Mamorallo Tjoka competing in the 2012 Olympic women's marathon

Mamorallo Tjoka was the oldest athlete representing Lesotho at the Olympic Games at the age of 27, and was the country's flag bearer at the opening ceremony. She had previously competed at the 2008 Summer Olympics in Beijing in the women's marathon which she withdrew from because she injured her leg. Tjoka qualified for the Games via a wildcard because she had not set a competitive time for the women's marathon, between the last Olympic Games and the London Olympics. She stated that if she won the marathon, she believed that her country would be "really happy". Her training was aided by Lesotho's high altitudes. Tjoka took part in the women's marathon on 5 August, finishing 90th out of 107 athletes, (Note: Eleven competitors did not finish.) with a time of 2 hours, 43 minutes, 15 seconds.

Key

- Note–Ranks given for track events are within the athlete's heat only
- N/A = Round not applicable for the event

Men

Athlete	Event	Heat		Semifinal		Final	
Athlete	Event	Result	Rank	Result	Rank	Result	Rank
Tsepo Ramonene	Marathon	—				2:55:54	85
Mosito Lehata	200 m	20.74	7	Did not advance			

Women

Athlete	Event	Final	
Athlete	Event	Result	Rank
Mamorallo Tjoka	Marathon	2:43:15	90

== Swimming ==
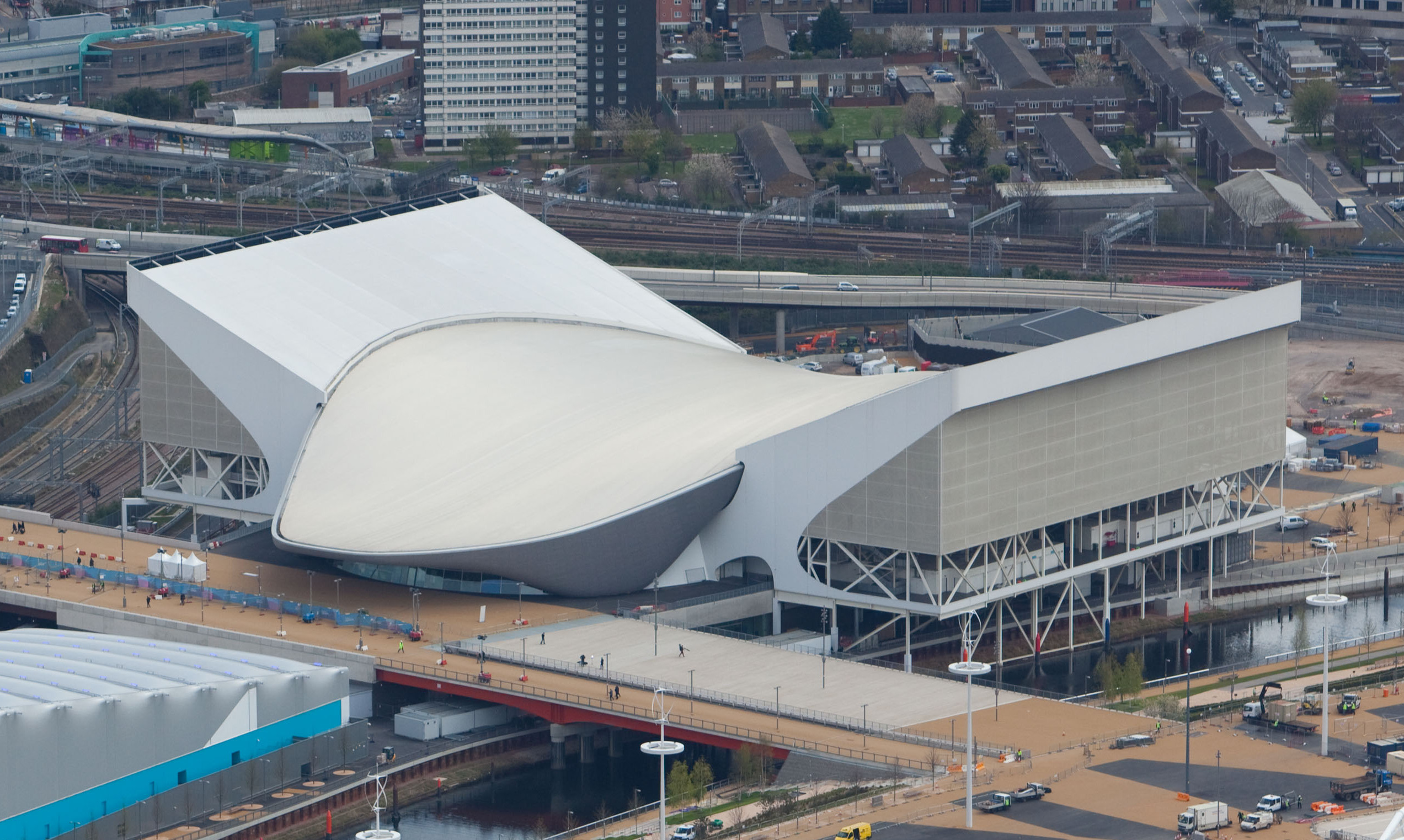
The London Aquatics Centre where Theko competed in the women's 50 metre freestyle event

Masempe Theko was participating in her first Olympic Games at the age of 25. She qualified after receiving a universality place awarded by FINA because her best time of 49.75 seconds in the women's 50 metre freestyle, was 23.99 seconds slower than the "B" standard qualifying time. Theko said that it was an "honour" that she was chosen to represent her country: "I don't know how to explain it, but in my head it really plays out big. I'm looking forward to the event, being in London and meeting new friends and acquaintances." She was drawn in the first heat of the women's 50 metre freestyle on 3 August, finishing third (and last), with a time of 42.35 seconds. Theko reacted over a second after the gun fired to signal the start of the heat, although she improved her personal best time by over seven seconds. She finished 73rd (and last) of all swimmers overall, (Note: One swimmer, Eszter Dara, did not start.) and did not advance to the semi-finals because her time was 17.07 seconds slower than the slowest athlete who progressed to the later stages.

Women

Athlete	Event	Heat		Semifinal		Final	
Athlete	Event	Time	Rank	Time	Rank	Time	Rank
Masempe Theko	50 m freestyle	42.35	73	Did not advance			

== See also ==
- Lesotho at the 2012 Summer Paralympics
