= Lesotho at the 1988 Summer Olympics =

- IOC code: LES
- NOC: Lesotho National Olympic Committee

in Seoul
- Competitors: 6 in 2 sports
- Flag bearer: Noheku Nteso
- Medals: Gold 0 Silver 0 Bronze 0 Total 0

Summer Olympics appearances (overview)
- 1972; 1976; 1980; 1984; 1988; 1992; 1996; 2000; 2004; 2008; 2012; 2016; 2020; 2024

Lesotho competed at the 1988 Summer Olympics in Seoul, South Korea.

== Competitors ==
The following is the list of number of competitors in the Games.

Sport	Men	Women	Total
Athletics	3	0	3
Boxing	3	–	3
Total	6	0	6

== Athletics ==
=== Men ===
Athlete	Event	Heat		Quarterfinal		Semifinal		Final	
Athlete	Event	Result	Rank	Result	Rank	Result	Rank	Result	Rank
Mothobi Kharitse	100 m	10.97	5	did not advance					
Mohala Mohloli	Marathon	—						2:44:44	82
Noheku Nteso	Marathon	—						2:29:44	61

== Boxing ==
=== Men ===
Athlete	Event	1 Round	2 Round	3 Round	Quarterfinals	Semifinals	Final	
Athlete	Event	Opposition Result	Opposition Result	Opposition Result	Opposition Result	Opposition Result	Opposition Result	Rank
Teboho Mathibeli	Flyweight	BYE	González (MEX); L 0-5	did not advance				
Ncholu Monontsi	Light Middleweight	BYE	Kitel (SWE); L 0-5	did not advance				
Sello Mojela	Middleweight	BYE	Stubblefield (LBR); W 5-0	Maske (GDR); L WO	did not advance			
