= Swimming at the 2012 Summer Olympics – Women's 50 metre freestyle =

Women's 50 metre freestyle at the Games of the XXX Olympiad
- Venue: London Aquatics Centre
- Dates: August 3, 2012 (heats & semifinals); August 4, 2012 (final)
- Competitors: 73 from 64 nations
- Winning time: 24.05 OR

Medalists
1st place, gold medalist(s)		Ranomi Kromowidjojo; Netherlands
2nd place, silver medalist(s)		Aliaksandra Herasimenia; Belarus
3rd place, bronze medalist(s)		Marleen Veldhuis; Netherlands

The women's 50 metre freestyle event at the 2012 Summer Olympics took place on 3–4 August at the London Aquatics Centre in London, United Kingdom.

Netherlands' Ranomi Kromowidjojo created a new Olympic record to strike a fourth sprint freestyle double in history, since East German Kristin Otto did so in 1988, her fellow countrywoman Inge de Bruijn in 2000, and Germany's defending champion Britta Steffen in 2008. She blistered the field with a sterling time and a textile best in 24.05 to slice off Steffen's previous Olympic record by a hundredth of a second (0.01). Belarus' Aliaksandra Herasimenia added a second silver to her Olympic medals in a national record of 24.28, while Kromowidjojo's teammate Marleen Veldhuis edged out the scorching Steffen (24.46) by 0.07 seconds to snatch the bronze in 24.39, handing over an entire medal haul for the Dutch squad with a one–three finish.

Great Britain's home favorite Francesca Halsall finished behind Steffen by a fingertip with a fifth-place time in 24.47. Meanwhile, Sweden's Therese Alshammar shook off a pinched nerve injury to officially compete in her fifth Olympics, but managed only to claim a sixth spot in 24.61. U.S. swimmer Jessica Hardy (24.62) and the Bahamas' Arianna Vanderpool-Wallace (24.69) rounded out the field in a splash-and-dash finale.

Notable swimmers missed the top-eight final including Aussie sisters Bronte and Cate Campbell, defending bronze medalist; and Halsall's teammate Amy Smith, who finished outside the roster by 16-hundredths of a second with a ninth-place time in 24.87. Earlier on the morning prelims, Smith picked up a sixteenth spot in a most exciting three-way swim-off against U.S. sprinter Kara Lynn Joyce and Iceland's Sarah Blake Bateman after they each posted a matching time of 25.28.

== Records ==
Prior to this competition, the existing world and Olympic records were as follows.

World record	Britta Steffen (GER)	23.73	Rome, Italy	2 August 2009
Olympic record	Britta Steffen (GER)	24.06	Beijing, China	17 August 2008

The following records were established during the competition:

Date	Event	Name	Nationality	Time	Record
August 4	Final	Ranomi Kromowidjojo	Netherlands	24.05	OR

== Results ==
=== Heats ===
Rank	Heat	Lane	Name	Nationality	Time	Notes
1	10	4	Ranomi Kromowidjojo	Netherlands	24.51	Q
2	10	5	Marleen Veldhuis	Netherlands	24.57	Q
3	9	4	Francesca Halsall	Great Britain	24.61	Q
4	9	5	Britta Steffen	Germany	24.70	Q
5	9	3	Aliaksandra Herasimenia	Belarus	24.76	Q
6	8	4	Therese Alshammar	Sweden	24.77	Q
7	10	2	Arianna Vanderpool-Wallace	Bahamas	24.85	Q
7	10	6	Jeanette Ottesen	Denmark	24.85	Q
9	8	3	Bronte Campbell	Australia	24.87	Q
10	8	5	Cate Campbell	Australia	24.94	Q
10	9	6	Sarah Sjöström	Sweden	24.94	Q
12	10	3	Jessica Hardy	United States	24.99	Q
13	8	7	Theodora Drakou	Greece	25.13	Q
14	9	7	Victoria Poon	Canada	25.15	Q
15	9	8	Anna Santamans	France	25.23	Q
16	7	6	Sarah Blake Bateman	Iceland	25.28	QSO
16	8	6	Kara Lynn Joyce	United States	25.28	QSO
16	9	2	Amy Smith	Great Britain	25.28	QSO
19	10	7	Triin Aljand	Estonia	25.33	
20	10	1	Sviatlana Khakhlova	Belarus	25.36	
21	8	2	Nery Mantey Niangkouara	Greece	25.40	
22	8	1	Graciele Herrmann	Brazil	25.44	
23	7	2	Hayley Palmer	New Zealand	25.47	
24	6	3	Zhu Qianwei	China	25.54	
24	9	1	Pernille Blume	Denmark	25.54	
26	5	4	Rūta Meilutytė	Lithuania	25.55	NR
26	6	5	Hanna-Maria Seppälä	Finland	25.55	
28	7	4	Arlene Semeco	Venezuela	25.56	
29	7	7	Vanessa García	Puerto Rico	25.58	
30	7	3	Anna Dowgiert	Poland	25.59	
31	7	8	Jolien Sysmans	Belgium	25.60	
32	6	6	Erika Ferraioli	Italy	25.69	
33	10	8	Darya Stepanyuk	Ukraine	25.70	
34	7	5	Burcu Dolunay	Turkey	25.72	
35	8	8	Yayoi Matsumoto	Japan	25.73	
36	7	1	Trudi Maree	South Africa	25.78	
37	6	8	Alia Atkinson	Jamaica	25.98	
38	6	2	Miroslava Syllabová	Slovakia	26.07	
39	5	3	Gabriela Ņikitina	Latvia	26.26	
40	5	5	Chinyere Pigot	Suriname	26.30	
41	6	1	Farida Osman	Egypt	26.34	
42	6	7	Miroslava Najdanovski	Serbia	26.46	
43	5	6	Nicola Muscat	Malta	27.22	
44	5	2	Jessica Teixeira Vieira	Mozambique	27.39	
45	5	7	Talita Baqlah	Jordan	27.45	
46	4	2	Joyce Tafathata	Malawi	27.74	
47	4	5	Judith Meauri	Papua New Guinea	27.84	
48	5	1	Faye Sultan	Kuwait	27.92	NR
49	4	4	Ann-Marie Hepler	Marshall Islands	28.06	
50	4	3	Keesha Keane	Palau	28.25	
51	4	6	Sabine Hazboun	Palestine	28.28	
52	5	8	Jamila Lunkuse	Uganda	28.44	
53	4	8	Antoinette Guedia Mouafo	Cameroon	29.28	
54	4	7	Celeste Brown	Cook Islands	29.36	
55	3	3	Karin O'Reilly Clashing	Antigua and Barbuda	30.01	
56	2	6	Debra Daniel	Federated States of Micronesia	30.32	
57	3	6	Hemthon Vitiny	Cambodia	30.44	
58	3	5	Alphonsine Agahozo	Rwanda	30.72	
59	3	2	Nada Arkaji	Qatar	30.89	
60	3	4	Katerina Izmaylova	Tajikistan	31.27	
61	4	1	Mariana Henriques	Angola	31.36	
62	3	7	Fatoumata Samassekou	Mali	31.88	
63	2	4	Angelika Ouedraogo	Burkina Faso	32.19	
64	3	8	Aminath Shajan	Maldives	32.23	
65	3	1	Yanet Seyoum	Ethiopia	32.41	
66	2	3	Assita Toure	Ivory Coast	33.09	
67	2	2	Elsie Uwamahoro	Burundi	33.14	
68	2	5	Sara Al Flaij	Bahrain	33.81	
69	2	7	Aminata Aboubakar Yacoub	Republic of the Congo	34.64	
70	2	1	Mhasin Fadlalla	Sudan	35.07	
71	1	4	Nafissatou Moussa Adamou	Niger	37.29	
72	1	5	Adzo Kpossi	Togo	37.55	
73	1	3	Masempe Theko	Lesotho	42.35	NR
	6	4	Eszter Dara	Hungary	DNS	

==== Qualification swim-off ====
Rank	Lane	Name	Nationality	Time	Notes
1	3	Amy Smith	Great Britain	24.82	Q
2	5	Kara Lynn Joyce	United States	25.16	
3	4	Sarah Blake Bateman	Iceland	26.03	

=== Semifinals ===
==== Semifinal 1 ====
Rank	Lane	Name	Nationality	Time	Notes
1	4	Marleen Veldhuis	Netherlands	24.50	Q
2	5	Britta Steffen	Germany	24.57	Q
3	6	Arianna Vanderpool-Wallace	Bahamas	24.64	Q, NR
4	7	Jessica Hardy	United States	24.68	Q
5	3	Therese Alshammar	Sweden	24.71	Q
6	8	Amy Smith	Great Britain	24.87	
7	2	Cate Campbell	Australia	25.01	
8	1	Victoria Poon	Canada	25.17	

==== Semifinal 2 ====
Rank	Lane	Name	Nationality	Time	Notes
1	4	Ranomi Kromowidjojo	Netherlands	24.07	Q
2	3	Aliaksandra Herasimenia	Belarus	24.45	Q, NR
3	5	Francesca Halsall	Great Britain	24.63	Q
4	2	Bronte Campbell	Australia	24.94	
4	8	Anna Santamans	France	24.94	
6	6	Jeanette Ottesen	Denmark	24.99	
7	7	Sarah Sjöström	Sweden	25.08	
8	1	Theodora Drakou	Greece	25.28	

=== Final ===
Rank	Lane	Name	Nationality	Time	Notes
1st place, gold medalist(s)	4	Ranomi Kromowidjojo	Netherlands	24.05	OR
2nd place, silver medalist(s)	5	Aliaksandra Herasimenia	Belarus	24.28	NR
3rd place, bronze medalist(s)	3	Marleen Veldhuis	Netherlands	24.39	
4	6	Britta Steffen	Germany	24.46	
5	2	Francesca Halsall	Great Britain	24.47	
6	8	Therese Alshammar	Sweden	24.61	
7	1	Jessica Hardy	United States	24.62	
8	7	Arianna Vanderpool-Wallace	Bahamas	24.69	
