= Lesotho at the 2016 Summer Olympics =

- IOC code: LES
- NOC: Lesotho National Olympic Committee
- Website: lnoc.tripod.com

in Rio de Janeiro
- Competitors: 8 in 3 sports
- Flag bearer: Mosito Lehata
- Medals: Gold 0 Silver 0 Bronze 0 Total 0

Summer Olympics appearances (overview)
- 1972; 1976; 1980; 1984; 1988; 1992; 1996; 2000; 2004; 2008; 2012; 2016; 2020; 2024

Lesotho competed at the 2016 Summer Olympics in Rio de Janeiro, Brazil, from 5 to 21 August 2016. This was the nation's eleventh appearance at the Summer Olympics, except the 1976 Summer Olympics in Montreal, because of its partial support to the African boycott.

Lesotho National Olympic Committee sent the nation's largest delegation to the Games since 1996. A total of eight athletes, seven men and one woman, were selected to the Lesotho team to compete only in athletics, boxing, and mountain biking (the nation's Olympic sporting debut in Rio de Janeiro). Track sprinter Mosito Lehata led the Lesotho delegation as the lone returning Olympian from London 2012 and the nation's flag bearer in the opening ceremony. Lesotho, however, has yet to win its first ever Olympic medal.

== Athletics (track and field) ==
Lesotho athletes have so far achieved qualifying standards in the following athletics events (up to a maximum of 3 athletes in each event):

Key

- Note–Ranks given for track events are within the athlete's heat only
- Q = Qualified for the next round
- q = Qualified for the next round as a fastest loser or, in field events, by position without achieving the qualifying target
- NR = National record
- N/A = Round not applicable for the event
- Bye = Athlete not required to compete in round
- NM = No mark

Track & road events

| Athlete | Event | Heat | | Quarterfinal | | Semifinal | | Final | |
| Athlete | Event | Result | Rank | Result | Rank | Result | Rank | Result | Rank |
|---|---|---|---|---|---|---|---|---|---|
| Mosito Lehata | Men's 100 m | Bye | | 10.25 | 4 | Did not advance | | | |
| Mosito Lehata | Men's 200 m | 20.65 | 7 | — | | Did not advance | | | |
| Namakoe Nkhasi | Men's 5000 m | 13:41.92 | 15 | — | | | | Did not advance | |
| Tsepo Mathibelle | Men's marathon | — | | | | | | DNF | |
| Lebenya Nkoka | Men's marathon | — | | | | | | 2:25:13 | 95 |
| Tsepang Sello | Women's 800 m | 2:10.22 | 8 | — | | Did not advance | | | |

== Boxing ==
Lesotho has entered one boxer to compete only in the men's bantamweight division into the Olympic boxing tournament. Inkululeko Suntele had claimed his Olympic spot with a semifinal victory at the 2016 African Qualification Tournament in Yaoundé, Cameroon. Meanwhile, flyweight boxer Moroke Mokhotho had received a spare Olympic berth as the next highest-ranked boxer, not yet qualified, in the same meet, due to South Africa's decision not to accept spots through the continental qualifier.

| Athlete | Event | Round of 32 | Round of 16 | Quarterfinals | Semifinals | Final | |
| Athlete | Event | Opposition Result | Opposition Result | Opposition Result | Opposition Result | Opposition Result | Rank |
|---|---|---|---|---|---|---|---|
| Moroke Mokhotho | Men's flyweight | Kharroubi (MAR); L 0–3 | Did not advance | | | | |
| Inkululeko Suntele | Men's bantamweight | Mhamdi (TUN); L 0–3 | Did not advance | | | | |

== Cycling ==
=== Mountain biking ===
Lesotho has received an invitation from Tripartite Commission to send a mountain biker for the men's Olympic cross-country race, signifying the nation's Olympic debut in the sport.

| Athlete | Event | Time | Rank |
|---|---|---|---|
| Phetetso Monese | Men's cross-country | Did not finish | |
