= Lesotho at the 1996 Summer Olympics =

- IOC code: LES
- NOC: Lesotho National Olympic Committee
- Website: lnoc.tripod.com

in Atlanta
- Competitors: 9 in 1 sport
- Flag bearer: Jessie Mathunta
- Medals: Gold 0 Silver 0 Bronze 0 Total 0

Summer Olympics appearances (overview)
- 1972; 1976; 1980; 1984; 1988; 1992; 1996; 2000; 2004; 2008; 2012; 2016; 2020; 2024

Lesotho competed at the 1996 Summer Olympics in Atlanta, United States.

== Competitors ==
The following is the list of number of competitors in the Games.

Sport	Men	Women	Total
Athletics	5	4	9
Total	5	4	9

== Athletics ==
=== Men ===
Athletes	Events	Heat Round 1		Heat Round 2		Semifinal		Final	
Athletes	Events	Time	Rank	Time	Rank	Time	Rank	Time	Rank
Mpho Morobe	400 metres	47.54	50	did not advance					
Thabisio Ralekhetla	Marathon	—						2:18:26	29
Isaac Seatile; Motlatsi Maseela; Makoekoe Mahanetsa; Mpho Morobe	4 x 400 metres relay	3:15.67	29	—		did not advance			

=== Women ===
Athletes	Events	Heat Round 1		Heat Round 2		Semifinal		Final	
Athletes	Events	Time	Rank	Time	Rank	Time	Rank	Time	Rank
Lineo Shoai	200 metres	26.25	46	did not advance					
Sebongile Sello; M'apotlaki Ts'elho; Nteboheleng Koaeana; Lineo Shoai	4 x 100 metres relay	Disqualified		—				did not advance	
