= Lesotho at the 2004 Summer Olympics =

- IOC code: LES
- NOC: Lesotho National Olympic Committee
- Website: lnoc.tripod.com

in Athens
- Competitors: 3 in 2 sports
- Flag bearer: Lineo Mochesane
- Medals: Gold 0 Silver 0 Bronze 0 Total 0

Summer Olympics appearances (overview)
- 1972; 1976; 1980; 1984; 1988; 1992; 1996; 2000; 2004; 2008; 2012; 2016; 2020; 2024

Lesotho competed at the 2004 Summer Olympics in Athens, Greece, from 13 to 29 August 2004. It was the last time the nation competed under a former flag.

== Athletics ==
Lesotho athletes have so far achieved qualifying standards in the following athletics events (up to a maximum of 3 athletes in each event at the 'A' Standard, and 1 at the 'B' Standard).

Men

Athlete	Event	Final	
Athlete	Event	Result	Rank
Mpesela Ntlot Soeu	Marathon	2:30:19	70

Women

Athlete	Event	Final	
Athlete	Event	Result	Rank
Mamokete Lechela	Marathon	3:11:56	64

Key

- Note–Ranks given for track events are within the athlete's heat only
- Q = Qualified for the next round
- q = Qualified for the next round as a fastest loser or, in field events, by position without achieving the qualifying target
- NR = National record
- N/A = Round not applicable for the event
- Bye = Athlete not required to compete in round

== Taekwondo ==
One Lesotho taekwondo jin qualified for the Olympics through a tripartite invitation.

Athlete	Event	Round of 16	Quarterfinals	Semifinals	Repechage 1	Repechage 2	Final / BM	
Athlete	Event	Opposition Result	Opposition Result	Opposition Result	Opposition Result	Opposition Result	Opposition Result	Rank
Lineo Mochesane	Women's −49 kg	Lukic (AUT); L 0–4	did not advance					
