= Hanne Poulsen =

Danish taekwondo practitioner

Personal information
- Nationality: Danish
- Born: 1981 (age 44–45)

Sport
- Sport: Taekwondo

Achievements and titles
- Olympic finals: 1 (2000)
- World finals: 2 (1997, 1999)
Medal record
Representing Denmark
Women's taekwondo
European Championships
Gold medal – first place	1998 Eindhoven	-51 kg
Bronze medal – third place	2000 Patras	-51 kg

Hanne Høegh Poulsen (born 25 January or 25 February 1981) is a Danish taekwondo practitioner. She won a gold medal at the 1998 European Taekwondo Championships, and a bronze medal at the 2000 European Championships. She placed 4th in flyweight at the 2000 Summer Olympics in Sydney, where she was defeated by eventual gold medalist Lauren Burns in the semifinal, and was defeated by Chi Shu-ju in the bronze final.
