= Lesotho at the 1972 Summer Olympics =

- IOC code: LES
- NOC: Lesotho National Olympic Committee
- Website: lnoc.tripod.com

in Munich
- Competitors: 1 in 1 sport
- Flag bearer: Motsapi Moorosi
- Medals: Gold 0 Silver 0 Bronze 0 Total 0

Summer Olympics appearances (overview)
- 1972; 1976; 1980; 1984; 1988; 1992; 1996; 2000; 2004; 2008; 2012; 2016; 2020; 2024

Lesotho sent a delegation to compete in the 1972 Summer Olympics in Munich, West Germany from 26 August to 11 September 1972. This was the African country's first time participating at the Olympic Games. Lesotho's delegation consisted of a single sprinter, Motsapi Moorosi. He competed in two events, being eliminated in the first round of the 100 meters, and advancing to the quarter-finals of the 200 meters.

== Background ==
The Lesotho National Olympic Committee was recognized by the International Olympic Committee on 1 January 1972. These Munich Olympics were their first appearance in Olympic competition, they have gone on to participate in every Summer Olympic Games since except the 1976 Montreal Games. The nation has yet to make its debut at the Winter Olympic Games, and they have never won an Olympic medal. The 1972 Summer Olympics were held from 26 August to 11 September 1972; a total of 7,134 athletes representing 121 National Olympic Committees took part in the Games. Track and field athlete Motsapi Moorosi was the only competitor Lesotho sent to Munich, and he was chosen as the flag-bearer for the opening ceremony.

== Athletics ==
Motsapi Moorosi was 27 years old at the time of the Munich Olympics, and was making his only Olympic appearance. On 31 August, he participated in the first round of the men's 100 meters, and was drawn into heat six. He finished the race with a time of 10.74 seconds, sixth out of seven in his heat, and he was unable to advance further in the competition. The gold medal was eventually won in 10.14 seconds by Valeriy Borzov of the Soviet Union, the silver medal was earned by Robert Taylor of the United States, and the bronze was taken by Lennox Miller of Jamaica.

The men's 200 meters was held over 3–4 September. In the first round, Moorosi was drawn into heat three, which he finished with a time of 21.15 seconds, fourth out of seven competitors in that heat, which was sufficient to advance him to the quarter-finals. For the quarter-finals, he was drawn into heat four, and finished with a time of 20.90 seconds. This put him fifth out of seven competitors in the heat, and he was eliminated as only the top three from each heat, and the fastest fourth-place finisher overall could advance. Borzov eventually won the gold medal in a time of 20 seconds flat, the United States' Larry Black won the silver medal, and the bronze medal was earned by Pietro Mennea of Italy.

Athlete	Event	Heat		Quarterfinal		Semifinal		Final	
Athlete	Event	Result	Rank	Result	Rank	Result	Rank	Result	Rank
Motsapi Moorosi	Men's 100 m	10.74	6	did not advance					
Motsapi Moorosi	Men's 200 m	21.15	4 Q	20.90	5	did not advance			
