= Aïssata Denn Conte =

Guinean sprinter

Aïssata Deen Conte
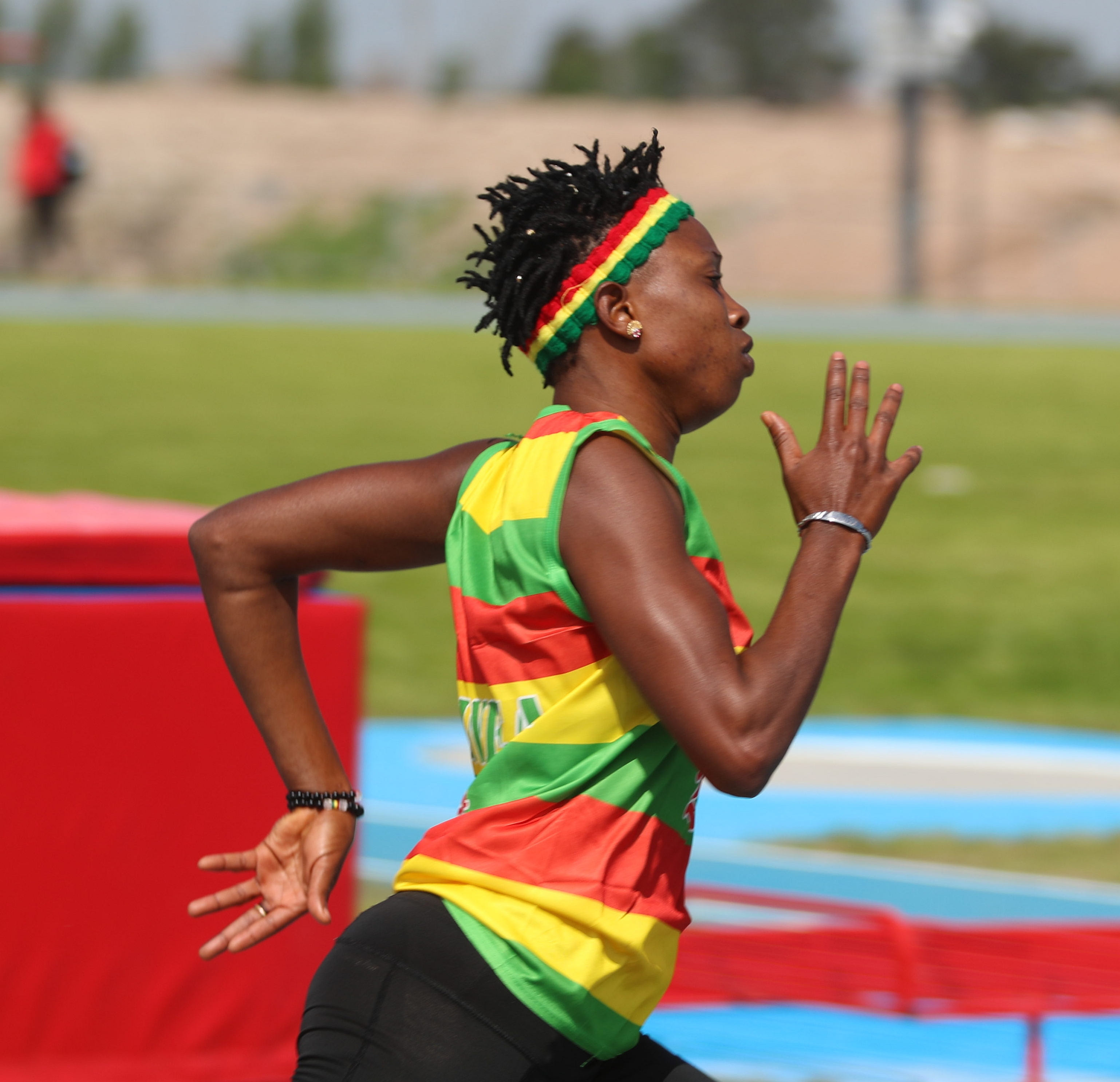
- Conte, 2018

Personal information
- Nationality: Guinea
- Born: 4 September 2001 (age 24)

Sport
- Sport: Athletics
- Event: 100 metres

Aïssata Deen Conte (born 4 September 2001) is a Guinean Olympic athlete.

== Career ==
Conte competed at the 2018 Summer Youth Olympics in Buenos Aires however she was disqualified from the 400 metres race. Conte was selected to represent Guinea in the women's 100 metres race at the delayed 2020 Summer Games in Tokyo. However, Conte did not have a smooth run into the Games; The Guinean sports ministry initially pulled all their athletes out of the event due to fears around the COVID-19 pandemic. This decision was rescinded two days before the opening ceremony in Tokyo, allowing their athletes to compete at short notice. Despite the upheaval, Conte ran a personal best time for the 100 metres of 12.43 seconds, although did not advance from her heat.

In June 2022, she competed over 100 metres at the 2022 African Championships in Athletics in St Pierre, Mauritius, running 12.92 seconds without advancing from her heat.
