= Lesotho at the 1980 Summer Olympics =

- IOC code: LES
- NOC: Lesotho National Olympic Committee

in Moscow
- Competitors: 5 in 1 sport
- Medals: Gold 0 Silver 0 Bronze 0 Total 0

Summer Olympics appearances (overview)
- 1972; 1976; 1980; 1984; 1988; 1992; 1996; 2000; 2004; 2008; 2012; 2016; 2020; 2024

Lesotho competed at the 1980 Summer Olympics in Moscow, USSR.

== Athletics ==
=== Men ===
Athlete	Event	Heat		Quarterfinal		Semifinal		Final	
Athlete	Event	Result	Rank	Result	Rank	Result	Rank	Result	Rank
Kenneth Hlasa	800 m	1:56.1	7	did not advance					
Kenneth Hlasa	Marathon	—						DNF	
Joseph Letseka	100 m	11.21	6	did not advance					
Joseph Letseka	200 m	22.31	5	did not advance					
Mopeli Molapo	1500 m	3:55.5	7	—		did not advance			
Vincent Rakabaele	Marathon	—						2:23:29	36
Motlalepula Thabana	10,000	34:01.5	10	—				did not advance	
