= Masempe Theko =

Mosotho swimmer

Personal information
- Nationality: Lesotho
- Born: 4 July 1987 (age 38); Maseru, Lesotho

Sport
- Sport: Swimming

Masempe Theko (born 4 July 1987) is a Mosotho swimmer. As a swimmer, she would make her international debut at the 2011 World Aquatics Championships. There she would compete in the 50 metre freestyle event and would place last, ranking 87th. Theko would be a late addition to the Lesotho team at the 2012 Summer Olympics, whereas they had been training in Wrexham. As they did not have a pool, Theko had to train in Liverpool.

At the 2012 Summer Olympics, she would become the first Mosotho swimmer to compete at an Olympic Games. She would compete in the heats of the 50 metre freestyle, placing last at 73rd place.

== Biography ==
Masempe Theko was born on 4 July 1987 in Maseru, Lesotho.

Theko would make her international debut in swimming at the 2011 World Aquatics Championships in Shanghai, China. There, she would compete in the heats of the women's 50 metre freestyle event against seven other athletes. She would compete on 30 July and would place last in her heat with a time of 49.75 seconds. She would place last overall, placing 87th, and would not advance to the semifinals of the event.

In the lead-up to the 2012 Summer Olympics in London, Great Britain, she would be a late addition to the Lesotho team at the Summer Games. As the Lesotho team were training in Wrexham, the local council had to make an arrangement for her to train in Liverpool as Wrexham did not have an Olympic-size swimming pool for Theko to train in. She would also suffer a cold. At the Summer Games, she would be the first swimmer to compete for the nation at any edition of the Olympic Games.

There, she would compete in the heats of the women's 50 metre freestyle event on 3 August at the London Aquatics Centre. Theko would compete against two other athletes in the first heat. She would finish with a time of 42.35 seconds and place last in her heat. She would also place last out of all of the swimmers that competed in the event, placing 73rd. She would not advance to the semifinals.
