= Lesotho at the 1992 Summer Olympics =

- IOC code: LES
- NOC: Lesotho National Olympic Committee

in Barcelona
- Competitors: 6 in 1 sport
- Medals: Gold 0 Silver 0 Bronze 0 Total 0

Summer Olympics appearances (overview)
- 1972; 1976; 1980; 1984; 1988; 1992; 1996; 2000; 2004; 2008; 2012; 2016; 2020; 2024

Lesotho competed at the 1992 Summer Olympics in Barcelona, Spain.

== Competitors ==
The following is the list of number of competitors in the Games.

Sport	Men	Women	Total
Athletics	5	1	6
Total	5	1	6

== Athletics ==
=== Men ===
Athlete	Event	Heat		Quarterfinal		Semifinal		Final	
Athlete	Event	Result	Rank	Result	Rank	Result	Rank	Result	Rank
Henry Mohoanyane	400 m	48.39	6	—					
Thabiso Moqhali	Marathon	—						2:19.28	33
Tello Namane	5000 m	14:33.04	14	—				did not advance	
Patrick Rama	10,000 m	30:21.69	21	—				did not advance	
Bothloko Shebe	100 m	10.94	8	did not advance					

=== Women ===
Athlete	Event	Heat		Quarterfinal		Semifinal		Final	
Athlete	Event	Result	Rank	Result	Rank	Result	Rank	Result	Rank
Mantokoane Pitso	800 m	2:29.77	8	—		did not advance			
