= Clement Lebopo =

Lesotho marathon runner

Personal information
- Full name: Clement Mabothile Lebopo
- Nationality: Lesotho
- Born: 31 December 1974 (age 51)
- Height: 1.59 m (5 ft 2 1/2 in)
- Weight: 62 kg (137 lb)

Sport
- Sport: Athletics
- Event: Marathon
- Club: Mr. Price Athletics Club

Achievements and titles
- Personal best: Marathon: 2:13:42 (2009)

Clement Mabothile Lebopo (born December 31, 1974) is a Lesotho marathon runner. At age thirty-three, Lebopo made his official debut for the 2008 Summer Olympics in Beijing, where he competed in the men's marathon, along with his compatriots Tsotang Maine and Moses Mosuhli. He did not finish the entire race, before reaching the 10 km lap of the course.
