= Lesotho at the 1984 Summer Olympics =

- IOC code: LES
- NOC: Lesotho National Olympic Committee

in Los Angeles
- Competitors: 4 in 2 sports
- Medals: Gold 0 Silver 0 Bronze 0 Total 0

Summer Olympics appearances (overview)
- 1972; 1976; 1980; 1984; 1988; 1992; 1996; 2000; 2004; 2008; 2012; 2016; 2020; 2024

Lesotho competed at the 1984 Summer Olympics in Los Angeles, United States.

== Athletics ==
=== Men ===
Athlete	Event	Heat		Quarterfinal		Semifinal		Final	
Athlete	Event	Result	Rank	Result	Rank	Result	Rank	Result	Rank
Frans Ntaole	10,000	30:18.71	13	—				did not advance	
Frans Ntaole	Marathon	—						2:21:09	40
Vincent Rakabaele	Marathon	—						2:32:15	61

== Boxing ==
=== Men ===
Athlete	Event	1 Round	2 Round	3 Round	Quarterfinals	Semifinals	Final	
Athlete	Event	Opposition Result	Opposition Result	Opposition Result	Opposition Result	Opposition Result	Opposition Result	Rank
Lefa Tsapi	Welterweight	BYE	Kitenge Kitangawa (ZAI); L RSC-1	did not advance				
Tsiu Monne	Middleweight	BYE	Mohamed Zaoui (ALG); L RSC-2	—	did not advance			
