= Moses Mosuhli =

Lesotho marathon runner

Personal information
- Full name: Moses Moeketsi Mosuhli
- Nationality: Lesotho
- Born: 5 August 1981 (age 44) Quthing, Lesotho
- Height: 1.59 m (5 ft 2 1/2 in)
- Weight: 62 kg (137 lb)

Sport
- Sport: Athletics
- Event: Marathon
- Club: Northern Lesotho Athletics Club

Achievements and titles
- Personal best: Marathon: 2:14:03 (2008)

Moses Moeketsi Mosuhli (born August 5, 1981, in Quthing) is a Lesotho marathon runner. He set his personal best time of 2:14:03, by finishing second at the 2008 Nedbank Durban City Marathon in Durban, South Africa.

Mosuhli represented Lesotho at the 2008 Summer Olympics in Beijing, where he competed in the men's marathon, along with his compatriots Tsotang Maine and Clement Lebopo. He did not finish the entire race, before reaching the halfway mark of the course.
