= Khoarahlane Seutloali =

Lesotho long-distance runner

Personal information
- Nationality: Lesotho
- Born: 30 March 1992 (age 34)

Sport
- Sport: Athletics
- Event: Long-distance running

Khoarahlane Seutloali (born 30 March 1992) is a long-distance runner from Lesotho.

== Career ==
Seutloali represented Lesotho at the 2020 Summer Olympics in Tokyo 2021, competing in the men's marathon.

Seutloali won the 56 km Two Oceans Marathon in 2025., as well as the 2025 Soweto Marathon.
