= Talaat Abada =

Egyptian taekwondo practitioner

Personal information
- Nationality: Egyptian
- Born: 1 June 1976 (age 50)
- Height: 1.72 m (5 ft 8 in)
- Weight: 58 kg (128 lb)

Sport
- Sport: Taekwondo

Talaat Abada (born 1 June 1976) is an Egyptian taekwondo practitioner. He competed in the men's flyweight at the 2000 Summer Olympics.
