= Azul Almazán =

Mexican diver

Personal information
- Full name: Azul Lizeth Almazán López
- Nationality: Mexican
- Born: 24 October 1981 (age 43)
- Height: 170 cm (5 ft 7 in)

Sport
- Country: Mexico
- Sport: Diving

Azul Lizeth Almazán López (born 24 October 1981) is a Mexican diver. She competed in three events at the 2000 Summer Olympics.
