= Gabriel Esparza =

Spanish taekwondo practitioner

Personal information
- Full name: Gabriel Esparza Pérez
- Born: 31 March 1973 (age 53) Pamplona, Navarre, Spain
Medal record
Men's taekwondo
Representing Spain
Olympic Games
Silver medal – second place	2000 Sydney	Flyweight (−58 kg)
World Championships
Silver medal – second place	1995 Manila	Bantamweight (−58 kg)
Bronze medal – third place	1991 Athens	Flyweight (−54 kg)

Gabriel Esparza Pérez (Note: In this Spanish name, the first or paternal surname is Esparza and the second or maternal family name is Pérez.) (born 31 March 1973 in Pamplona, Navarre) is a Spanish taekwondo practitioner and Olympic medalist. He received a silver medal in 58 kg class at the 2000 Summer Olympics in Sydney. He won three consecutive European Championships in 1992, 1994 and 1996.

Although many Spanish taekwondo athletes have won medals in international competitions, Esparza was the only Olympic medalist from Spain in taekwondo until the 2012 Summer Olympics, where Spain won three medals in taekwondo (one gold and two silver medals).
