= Abel Mokibe =

South African long-distance runner

Personal information
- Nationality: South African
- Born: 3 July 1965 (age 61)

Sport
- Sport: Long-distance running
- Event: Marathon

Abel Mokibe (born 3 July 1965) is a South African long-distance runner. He competed in the men's marathon at the 1992 Summer Olympics.
