= Mfanukhona Dlamini =

Swazi taekwondo practitioner

Personal information
- Nationality: Swazi
- Born: 5 October 1979 (age 46)

Sport
- Sport: Taekwondo

Mfanukhona Sendo Dlamini (born 5 October 1979) is a Swazi taekwondo practitioner. He competed in the men's 58 kg event at the 2000 Summer Olympics.
