= Marcel More =

Slovenian taekwondo practitioner

Personal information
- Nationality: Slovenian
- Born: 13 September 1975 (age 50) Ljubljana, Yugoslavia

Sport
- Sport: Taekwondo

Marcel More (born 13 September 1975) is a Slovenian taekwondo practitioner. He competed in the men's 80 kg event at the 2000 Summer Olympics.
