= Mokete Mokhosi =

Lesotho taekwondo practitioner

Personal information
- Nationality: Lesotho
- Born: 7 May 1969 (age 57)

Sport
- Sport: Taekwondo
Medal record
Representing Lesotho
Men's taekwondo
African Championships
Gold medal – first place	1996 Johannesburg	–83 kg
Gold medal – first place	1998 Nairobi	–84 kg

Mokete Mokhosi (born 7 May 1969) is a Lesotho taekwondo practitioner. He competed in the men's 80 kg category during the 2000 Summer Olympics. He also competed in the 1997 and 1999 World Taekwondo Championships.

Olympic Games
Preceded by Jessie Mathunta	Flagbearer for Lesotho; 2000 Sydney	Succeeded by Lineo Mochesane
