= Younes Sekkat =

Moroccan taekwondo practitioner

Younès Sekkat
Personal information
- Nationality: Moroccan
- Born: 29 April 1974 (age 50)

Sport
- Sport: Taekwondo

Younès Sekkat (born 29 April 1974) is a Moroccan former taekwondo practitioner. He competed in the men's 58 kg event at the 2000 Summer Olympics.
