= Kyeshi =

Taekwondo competitions

Kyeshi ("suspend", medical timeout) is a term used in taekwondo competitions.

The use of the term is described in article 19 of the competition rules administrated by the World Taekwondo Federation. Article 19 describes the procedure for handling injuries during a contest. The match is stopped with the declaration "kal-yeo", and the time recording is suspended by giving the message "kye-shi" to the recorder. When a kye-shi is declared, the injured contestant is allowed one minute of medical first aid. If the contestant is not able or willing to continue the match after one minute, the match is stopped. In case the injury was caused by a prohibited attack (Gam-jeon), the injured contestant is declared winner. If the injury was not caused by a prohibited action, the injured contestant is declared loser. If both contestants are injured and not able to continue, the scored points decide the outcome of the match.

The duration of a kyeshi timeout is one minute. The referee shall announce time warnings every five seconds, starting from 40 seconds after kyeshi was declared, up to the end of the timeout after 60 seconds.
