= Muhammed Dahmani =

Danish taekwondo practitioner

Personal information
- Nationality: Danish
- Born: 17 July 1975 (age 49)

Sport
- Sport: Taekwondo

Muhammed Dahmani (born 17 July 1975) is a Danish taekwondo practitioner. He competed in the men's 80 kg event at the 2000 Summer Olympics.
