= Warren Hansen (taekwondo) =

Australian taekwondo practitioner

Personal information
- Nationality: Australian
- Born: 25 August 1970 (age 55) Melbourne, Australia

Sport
- Sport: Taekwondo

Warren Hansen (born 25 August 1970) is an Australian taekwondo practitioner. He competed in the men's 80 kg event at the 2000 Summer Olympics.
