= Lauren Burns =

Australian taekwondo practitioner (born 1974)

- Born: 8 June 1974 (age 51); Melbourne, Australia
- Style: Taekwondo
- Teachers: Martin and Jeanette Hall, Grandmaster Joon No, Jin Tae Jeong
- Rank: 3rd dan taekwondo (KUKKIWON)

Other information
- Spouse: Nathan Muller
- Children: 2
- Notable schools: Preshil, The Margret Lyttle Memorial School
- Website: www.laurenburns.com

Lauren Chantel Burns OAM (born 8 June 1974) is an Australian taekwondo practitioner and Olympic champion. She won Australia's first Olympic gold medal in taekwondo at the 2000 Summer Olympics in Sydney, competing in the women's under 49 kg class. Burns holds the rank of 3rd dan black belt in taekwondo. Following her competitive taekwondo career, she has been involved in a range of activities, including motivational speaking and community work.

== Early life ==
Burns was born on 8 June 1974 in Melbourne, Australia, the daughter of singer Ronnie Burns and dancer Maggie Burns (née Stewart). As a child, she did not participate much in sports. Her younger brother, Michael (then aged 7), became interested in martial arts after watching the Teenage Mutant Ninja Turtles, and started learning taekwondo. Shortly thereafter, their father also began training in taekwondo; together, her father and brother encouraged her (then aged 14) to begin training as well.

Burns began her taekwondo training at Joon No(노의준)'s Taekwondo (JNTKD), she began competing in taekwondo in 1990; she was training under Grandmaster Joon No's direction at the time and became a national team member, her training partner was Donna Scherp.

== Competitive taekwondo career ==
Lauren Burns
Medal record

Representing Australia

Women's taekwondo

Olympic Games
Gold medal – first place	2000 Sydney	49 kg

World Championships
Bronze medal – third place	1997 Hong Kong	Bantamweight

A successful tournament career included 12 Australian women's national taekwondo championships, a bronze medal at the World Cup in 1996, a bronze medal in the under 51 kg class at the 1997 World Taekwondo Championships in Hong Kong, and a gold medal at the US Open taekwondo competition in 1999. Her first appearance at the World Championships was at the 1993 World Taekwondo Championships in New York, and she shared fifth place in the bantamweight division at the 1995 World Taekwondo Championships in the Philippines. She has also won medals at many other competitions outside Australia.

Burns studied naturopathy, but deferred her studies for a year to focus on her Olympic campaign in 2000, training under Australian national taekwondo coach Jin Tae Jeong(정진태). She trained 5–7 hours a day in preparation for Olympic competition. Burns was listed at 165 cm (5 ft 5 in) in height and 49 kg (108 lb) in weight, but has since indicated that 54 kg (119 lb) is her natural weight. On 23 August 2000, less than a month before the Sydney Olympics, she was awarded the Australian Sports Medal. Burns won a gold medal in taekwondo at the 2000 Summer Olympics, in a tournament marked by controversial judging at times. She defeated Taiwanese competitor Chi Shu-Ju in the quarter final, who claimed that the loud cheering of the parochial home crowd had influenced the judges, and won the Olympic final against Cuban competitor Urbia Melendez.

Her Olympic gold medal was stolen in 2003, but it was recovered within a few days. That same year, she published her autobiography, Fighting Spirit: From a charmed childhood to the Olympics and beyond.

== Post-competition career ==
Burns is linked with the Victorian Institute of Sport and the South Australian Sports Institute. Apart from her taekwondo career, Burns also works as a motivational speaker and promotes the "Zip Bag", which she designed. She also supports the Red Dust Role Models community project and is an ambassador for charitable organisation World Vision. Burns resides in Melbourne with her husband, Nathan Muller, and their children, Mac Banjo (born in early 2009) and Piper (born in 2010).

== Recognition ==
On 26 January 2001 (Australia Day), Burns was honoured with a Medal of the Order of Australia. In 2017, Burns was inducted into the Sport Australia Hall of Fame.

== See also ==
- Daniel Trenton
- Sparring
- World Taekwondo Federation
- List of Olympic medalists in taekwondo
