= Malehloana =

- Community Council
- Geographic Center of Community
- Coordinates: 29°36′21″S 28°10′31″E
- Country: Lesotho
- District: Thaba-Tseka District
- Elevation: 6,430 ft (1,960 m)

Population (2006)
  - Total: 11,161
- Time zone: UTC+2 (CAT)
- Coordinates computed from Lesotho Villages file.

Malehloana is a community council located in the Thaba-Tseka District of Lesotho. Its population in 2006 was 11,161.

== Villages ==
The community of Malehloana includes the villages of

- Aupolasi
- Ha Apili
- Ha Cheche
- Ha Fantisi
- Ha Felete
- Ha Janrase
- Ha Khohlopo
- Ha Koporale
- Ha Labane
- Ha Lephaila
- Ha Letsumu
- Ha Mahloko
- Ha Makopoi
- Ha Malefetsane
- Ha Mapoki
- Ha Mariti
- Ha Mariti (Khohlong)
- Ha Mariti (Motsekuoa)
- Ha Mariti (Thoteng)
- Ha Matlabathe
- Ha Matlotlo
- Ha Mohale
- Ha Mokeke
- Ha Moriana
- Ha Morie
- Ha Motau (Matoneng)
- Ha Motšoanakaba
- Ha Mpate
- Ha Mpuoe
- Ha Noha
- Ha Ntaote
- Ha Ntintana
- Ha Oropeng
- Ha Popa
- Ha Qhala
- Ha Ralebetlana
- Ha Ramosebo
- Ha Ranthocha
- Ha Rantsatsi
- Ha Sekoeta
- Ha Sepokane
- Ha Seqhoe
- Ha Seteke
- Ha Setena
- Ha Setlaba
- Ha Sootho
- Ha Takane
- Ha Tenesolo
- Ha Thaane
- Ha Thejane
- Ha Tlali
- Ha Tšitso
- Ha Tšiu
- Khamolane
- Kholokoe
- Khubetsoana
- Koma-Koma
- Lefikaneng
- Letlapeng
- Letsatseng
- Lihlephehlepheng
- Likoeneng
- Likoung
- Makhalong
- Malothoaneng
- Mancheche
- Manganeng
- Mangaung
- Masaleng
- Matamong
- Matebeleng
- Matomaneng
- Meeling
- Motsekuoa
- Nthabeleng
- Pitseng
- Sebothoane
- Sefateng
- Sekokoaneng
- Teletsana
- Tenteng
- Thabang
- Tholang
- Tholanyane
- Tlhakoaneng
