= Kirsimarja Koskinen =

Finnish taekwondo practitioner

Personal information
- Nationality: Finnish
- Born: 11 April 1969 (age 55); Helsinki, Finland

Sport
- Sport: Taekwondo

Achievements and titles
- Olympic finals: 1 (2000)
- World finals: 8 (1989–2003)

Kirsimarja Koskinen (born 11 April 1969) is a Finnish taekwondo practitioner. She was born in Helsinki.

== Career ==
Koskinen won a silver medal at the 1990 European championships, and bronze medal in 1994 and 1996. She participated at the World Taekwondo Championships eight times, first time in 1989. She competed at the 2000 Summer Olympics in Sydney.
