= Meriem Bidani =

Moroccan taekwondo practitioner (born 1972)

Personal information
- Nationality: Moroccan
- Born: 7 July 1972 (age 54)

Sport
- Sport: Taekwondo
Medal record
Representing Morocco
Women's taekwondo
African Championships
Gold medal – first place	1996 Johannesburg	60 kg

Meriem Bidani (born 7 July 1972) is a Moroccan taekwondo practitioner.

She competed at the 2000 Summer Olympics in Sydney. She won a gold medal at the 1996 African Taekwondo Championships in Johannesburg.
