= Mamorallo Tjoka =

Basotho long-distance runner (born 1984)

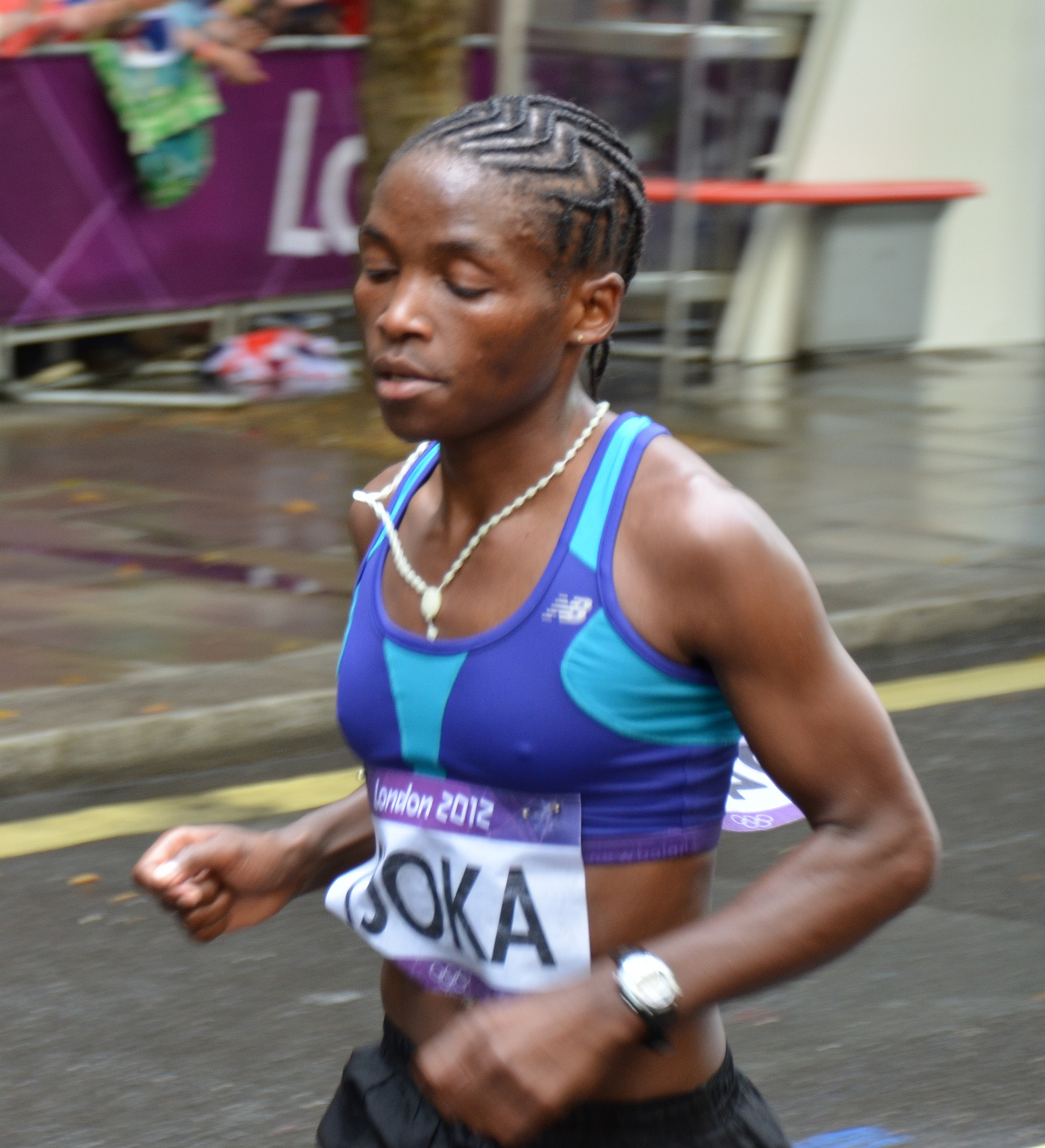
- Mamoroallo Tjoka in the 2012 Summer Olympics marathon

Personal information
- Born: October 25, 1984 (age 41) Ha Seqhoe, 'Malehloana, Thaba-Tseka District, Lesotho
- Height: 1.42 m (4 ft 8 in)
- Weight: 56 kg (123 lb)

Sport
- Country: Lesotho
- Sport: Athletics
- Event: Marathon

Mamoroallo Tjoka (born 25 October 1984 in Ha Seqhoe, Malehloana, Lesotho) is a Basotho long-distance runner who competed in the marathon event at the 2008 and 2012 Summer Olympics. She was the flag bearer of Lesotho during the 2012 Summer Olympics opening ceremony.

Olympic Games
Preceded by Simon Maine	Flagbearer for Lesotho; 2012 London	Succeeded by Mosito Lehata
