= Mirjam Müskens =

Dutch taekwondo practitioner

Personal information
- Nationality: Dutch
- Born: 24 May 1967 (age 59)

Sport
- Sport: Taekwondo
Medal record
Representing the Netherlands
Women's taekwondo
World Championships
Silver medal – second place	1999 Edmonton	Welterweight

Mirjam Müskens (born 24 May 1967) is a Dutch taekwondo practitioner.

She competed at the 2000 Summer Olympics in Sydney. She won a silver medal in welterweight at the 1999 World Taekwondo Championships, defeated by Elena Benítez in the final.

She is an academic physiotherapist at HAN University of Applied Sciences.
