= Mohammad Al-Fararjeh =

Jordanian taekwondo practitioner

Personal information
- Nationality: Jordan
- Born: 16 October 1977 (age 47)
- Height: 1.75 m (5 ft 9 in)
- Weight: 77 kg (170 lb)

Sport
- Sport: Taekwondo

Mohammad Al-Fararjeh (Arabic: محمد الفرارجة; born 16 October 1977) is a Jordanian taekwondo practitioner. He competed in the 2000 Summer Olympics, and lost both of his matches.
