= József Salim =

Hungarian taekwondo practitioner (1967–2022)

Personal information
- Nationality: Hungarian
- Born: 15 May 1967 Budapest, Hungary
- Died: 8 April 2022 (aged 54)

Sport
- Sport: Taekwondo

József Salim (15 May 1967 – 8 April 2022) was a Hungarian taekwondo practitioner. He competed at the 1992 Summer Olympics and 2000 Summer Olympics.

== Personal life ==
Salim was born in Hungary to a Tanzanian father and Hungarian mother, and moved to Denmark at a young age. His brother Gergely Salim, and nephew Omar Salim, were also Olympic boxers..
