= Gabriel Taraburelli =

Argentine taekwondo practitioner (born 1981)

Personal information
- Born: 21 April 1981 San Justo, Argentina

Sport
- Sport: Taekwondo

Gabriel Taraburelli (born 21 April 1981) was an Argentine taekwondo practitioner. He competed at the 2000 Summer Olympics.
