= Naser Buftain =

Kuwaiti taekwondo practitioner

Personal information
- Nationality: Kuwaiti
- Born: 16 September 1979 Kuwait

Sport
- Sport: Taekwondo

Naser Buftain (born 16 September 1979) was a Kuwaiti taekwondo practitioner. He competed at the 2000 Summer Olympics.
