= Félipe Soto =

Chilean taekwondo practitioner

Felipe Soto
Personal information
- Nationality: Chilean
- Born: 3 March 1972 (age 53)

Sport
- Sport: Taekwondo

Felipe Soto (born 3 March 1972) is a Chilean taekwondo practitioner. He competed in the men's 80 kg event at the 2000 Summer Olympics.
