= Neheng Khatala =

Lesotho long-distance runner

Personal information
- Nationality: Lesotho
- Born: 2 July 1992 (age 33)

Sport
- Sport: Athletics
- Event: Long-distance running

Neheng Khatala (born 2 July 1992) is a Lesotho long-distance runner. She qualified to represent Lesotho at the 2020 Summer Olympics in Tokyo 2021, competing in women's marathon.

She is also the African soweto marathon 2024 winner with a record of 2:43:07 in November 2024.
