= Trude Gundersen =

Norwegian taekwondo athlete

Olympic medal record

Representing Norway

Women's taekwondo
Silver medal – second place	2000 Sydney	67 kg

Trude Gundersen (born 6 June 1977 in Bergen) is a retired Norwegian taekwondo athlete. She was Norway's first and only taekwondo competitor during the 2000 Summer Olympics in Sydney, and won a silver medal in the -67 kg weight class.

After the 2000 Summer Olympics she tried to continue the hard training in combination with her ambition to become a doctor. But in 2002 she quit professional taekwondo and focused instead on her medical studies.
