= Mario De Meo =

Italian taekwondo practitioner

Personal information
- Nationality: Italian
- Born: 8 September 1974 (age 51) Formia, Italy

Sport
- Country: Italy
- Sport: Taekwondo
- Event: Men's 80 kg

Mario De Meo (born 8 September 1974) is an Italian former taekwondo practitioner. He competed in several editions of the European Taekwondo Championships and World Taekwondo Championships, with notable appearances in the late 1990s. He also competed in the men's 80 kg event at the 2000 Summer Olympics.

== See also ==
- Italy at the 2000 Summer Olympics
- Taekwondo at the 2000 Summer Olympics
