= Elena Benítez =

Spanish taekwondo practitioner

Personal information
- Nationality: Spanish
- Born: 26 October 1966 (age 59) Málaga, Spain

Sport
- Sport: Taekwondo
Medal record
Representing Spain
Women's taekwondo
World Championships
Gold medal – first place	1999 Edmonton	Welterweight
European Championships
Bronze medal – third place	1986 Seefeld	-60 kg
Bronze medal – third place	1990 Aarhus	-60 kg
Silver medal – second place	1994 Zagreb	-65 kg
Gold medal – first place	1996 Helsinki	-65 kg
Gold medal – first place	1998 Eindhoven	-67 kg
Silver medal – second place	2000 Patras	-67 kg

Elena Benítez (born 26 October 1966) is a Spanish taekwondo practitioner. She was born in Málaga. She competed at the 2000 Summer Olympics in Sydney. She won a gold medal in welterweight at the 1999 World Taekwondo Championships, by defeating by Mirjam Müskens in the final. Her achievements at the European Taekwondo Championships include bronze medals in 1986 and 1990, a silver medal in 1994, gold medals in 1996 and 1998, and a silver medal in 2000.
