= Fadime Helvacioglu =

German taekwondo practitioner

Fadime Karatas
Personal information
- Nationality: German
- Born: 24 May 1979 (age 46) Bielefeld, West Germany

Sport
- Sport: Taekwondo

Fadime Helvacioglu (born 24 May 1979) is a German taekwondo practitioner from Bielefeld.

She competed in the 2000 Summer Olympics in Sydney.
