= Faissal Ebnoutalib =

German taekwondo practitioner

Medal record

Representing Germany

Men's taekwondo

Olympic Games
Silver medal – second place	2000 Sydney	80kg

World Championships
Bronze medal – third place	1999 Edmonton	Middleweight

European Championships
Gold medal – first place	2000 Patras	Middleweight

Faissal Ebnoutalib (born 20 November 1970 in Nador) is a Moroccan German taekwondo practitioner and Olympic medalist. He is a seven-time German middleweight national champion and received the silver medal in the 80 kg division at the 2000 Summer Olympics in Sydney.

His younger brother, Mohamed, is a German taekwondo practitioner who won the silver medal at the 2003 World Taekwondo Championships. His son, Younes, is a footballer who currently plays for Bundesliga club Eintracht Frankfurt.
