= Chi Shu-ju =

Taiwanese taekwondo practitioner

Personal information
- Nationality: Taiwanese
- Born: 27 November 1982 (age 43)

Sport
- Sport: Taekwondo
Medal record
Women's taekwondo
Representing Chinese Taipei
Olympic Games
Bronze medal – third place	2000 Sydney	49 kg
World Championships
Gold medal – first place	1999 Edmonton	Flyweight
Gold medal – first place	1997 Hong Kong	Flyweight

Chi Shu-ju (Chinese: 紀淑如; pinyin: Jì Shūrú; born 27 November 1982) is a Taiwanese taekwondo practitioner and Olympic medalist. She competed at the 2000 Summer Olympics in Sydney where she received a bronze medal in the 49 kg class.

== See also ==
- List of Olympic medalists in taekwondo
