= Tsotang Maine =

Basotho long-distance runner (born 1974)

Personal information
- Full name: Simon Tsotang Maine
- Born: August 10, 1974 (age 51)
- Height: 1.83 m (6 ft 0 in)
- Weight: 82 kg (181 lb)

Sport
- Country: Lesotho
- Sport: Athletics
- Event: Marathon

Simon Tsotang Maine (born August 10, 1974, in Ha Molengoane, Ratau, Lesotho) is a Basotho long-distance runner who competed in the men's marathon event at the 2008 Summer Olympics. He was the flag bearer of Lesotho during the 2008 Summer Olympics opening ceremony.

Olympic Games
| Preceded by Lineo Mochesane | Flagbearer for Lesotho; 2008 Beijing | Succeeded by Mamorallo Tjoka |
