= Sebastien Konan =

Ivorian taekwondo practitioner

Sebastien N'Guessan Konan is a Taekwondo athlete from Côte d'Ivoire. He started Taekwondo at a very young age. He is a two-time Olympic athlete. Sebastien Konan is the athlete who officially represented Côte d'Ivoire for the first time at the Olympic Games in Taekwondo when the sport became an Olympic event in Sydney, Australia. Sebastien Konan has won many gold medals in national and international competitions. He was decorated 3 times with the Medal of Honor from the Ministry of Sport and the Chancellor. He was ambassador of the International Olympic Committee (IOC) as a scholarship bearer. He won the gold medal at the 1999 All-Africa Games in Taekwondo for the first time in Côte d'Ivoire and the gold medal at the 2006 US Taekwondo Open and US National. He is a 4 time gold medalist at the African Taekwondo Championships, a 2 time gold medalist at the World Francophonie Cup, a 15 time National Champion, and a gold medalist in many other international open tournaments.

He has appeared in many newspapers and on television shows both in Côte d'Ivoire and internationally, including the Washington Post, CNN, BBC, WITN News, TV5 France, Sport Magazine, and ADELPHIA Cable.
