= Víctor Estrada =

Mexican taekwondo practitioner

Medal record

Representing Mexico

Men's taekwondo

Olympic Games
Bronze medal – third place	2000 Sydney	80 kg

World Championships
Silver medal – second place	1993 New York	Middleweight

Pan American Games
Gold medal – first place	Mar del Plata 1995	Middleweight
Gold medal – first place	Winnipeg 1999	80 kg
Gold medal – first place	Santo Domingo 2003	+80 kg

Central American and Caribbean Games
Gold medal – first place	Maracaibo 1998	Middleweight
Gold medal – first place	San Salvador 2002	Heavyweight

Victor Manuel Estrada Garibay (born October 28, 1971, in Matamoros, Tamaulipas) is a Mexican taekwondo practitioner and Olympic medalist. He competed at the 2000 Summer Olympics in Sydney where he received a bronze medal in the 80 kg division. He also competed at the 2004 Athens Olympics, finishing in equal fifth position.

Estrada also won a silver medal in the Middleweight at the 1993 World Taekwondo Championships in New York.
