= Águeda Pérez =

Mexican taekwondo practitioner

Águeda Pérez López
Personal information
- Born: 5 January 1974 (age 52) Mexico City, Mexico

Sport
- Sport: Taekwondo
Medal record
Representing Mexico
Women's taekwondo
World Championships
Silver medal – second place	1993 New York City	Flyweight

Águeda Pérez López (born 5 January 1974) is a Mexican taekwondo practitioner, born in Mexico City.

She competed at the 2000 Summer Olympics in Sydney.
