= Likeleli Thamae =

Lesotho taekwondo practitioner

Likeleli Alinah Thamae
Personal information
- Nationality: Lesotho
- Born: 4 January 1978 (age 47)

Sport
- Sport: Taekwondo

Likeleli Alinah Thamae (born 4 January 1978) is a Lesotho taekwondo practitioner.

She competed at the 2000 Summer Olympics in Sydney, where she placed seventh in women's flyweight.
