= Roman Livaja =

Swedish taekwondo practitioner

Personal information
- Nationality: Swedish
- Born: 1 November 1974 (age 50); Malmö, Sweden

Sport
- Sport: Taekwondo

Roman Livaja (born 1 November 1974) is a Swedish taekwondo practitioner. He competed in the men's 80 kg event at the 2000 Summer Olympics.
