= Urbia Meléndez =

Cuban taekwondo practitioner

Medal record

Representing Cuba

Women's taekwondo

Olympic Games
Silver medal – second place	2000 Sydney	49 kg

Urbia Meléndez (born July 30, 1972) is a Cuban taekwondo practitioner and Olympic medalist. She received a silver medal in flyweight at the 2000 Summer Olympics in Sydney.

== See also ==
- List of Olympic medalists in taekwondo
