= Philippines at the 2000 Summer Olympics =

- Flag of the Philippines
- IOC code: PHI
- NOC: Philippine Olympic Committee
- Website: www.olympic.ph

in Sydney
- Competitors: 20 in 9 sports
- Flag bearer: Donald Geisler
- Medals: Gold 0 Silver 0 Bronze 0 Total 0

Summer Olympics appearances (overview)
- 1924; 1928; 1932; 1936; 1948; 1952; 1956; 1960; 1964; 1968; 1972; 1976; 1980; 1984; 1988; 1992; 1996; 2000; 2004; 2008; 2012; 2016; 2020; 2024

The Philippines was represented at the 2000 Summer Olympics in Sydney, New South Wales, Australia by the Philippine Olympic Committee.

In total, 20 athletes including 11 men and nine women represented the Philippines in nine different sports including archery, athletics, boxing, diving, equestrian, rowing, shooting, swimming and Taekwondo.

== Competitors ==
In total, 20 athletes represented the Phillipnes at the 2000 Summer Olympics in Sydney, New South Wales, Australia across nine different sports.

Sport	Men	Women	Total
Archery	0	1	1
Athletics	1	1	2
Boxing	4	—	4
Diving	1	1	2
Equestrian	0	1	1
Rowing	1	0	1
Shooting	0	1	1
Swimming	2	2	4
Taekwondo	2	2	4
Total	11	9	20

== Archery ==
In total, one Filipino athlete participated in the archery events – Jennifer Chan in the women's individual.

Athlete	Event	Ranking round		Round of 64	Round of 32	Round of 16	Quarterfinals	Semifinals	Final	
Athlete	Event	Score	Seed	Opposition Score	Opposition Score	Opposition Score	Opposition Score	Opposition Score	Opposition Score	Rank
Jennifer Chan	Women's individual	613	52	Altinkaynak (TUR) (12); L 143–160	did not advance					

== Athletics ==
In total, two Filipino athletes participated in the athletics events – Eduardo Buenavista in the men's 3,000 m steeplechase and Lerma Elmira Bulauitan in the women's 100 m.

Men

Athlete	Event	Heats		Quarterfinal		Semifinal		Final	
Athlete	Event	Result	Rank	Result	Rank	Result	Rank	Result	Rank
Eduardo Buenavista	3,000 m steeplechase	9:13.71	14	—N/a		did not advance			

Women

Athlete	Event	Heats		Quarterfinal		Semifinal		Final	
Athlete	Event	Result	Rank	Result	Rank	Result	Rank	Result	Rank
Lerma Elmira Bulauitan	100 m	12.08	5	did not advance					

== Boxing ==
In total, four Filipino athletes participated in the boxing events – Romeo Brin in the light welterweight category, Arlan Lerio in the flyweight category, Danilo Lerio in the light flyweight category and Larry Semillano in the lightweight category.

Athlete	Event	Round of 32	Round of 16	Quarterfinals	Semifinals	Final	
Athlete	Event	Opposition Result	Opposition Result	Opposition Result	Opposition Result	Opposition Result	Rank
Danilo Lerio	Light flyweight	—N/a	Lozano (ESP); L 17–25	did not advance			
Arlan Lerio	Flyweight	Asiku (UGA); W RSC	Rzany (POL); L 18–18+	did not advance			
Larry Semillano	Lightweight	Kotelnyk (UKR); L RSC	did not advance				
Romeo Brin	Light Welterweight	Bykovsky (BLR); L 5–8	did not advance				

== Diving ==
In total, two Filipino athletes participated in the diving events – Zardo Domenios in the men's 3 m springboard and Sheila Mae Perez in the women's 3 m springboard.

Men

Athlete	Event	Preliminaries		Semifinals				Final			
Athlete	Event	Points	Rank	Points	Rank	Total	Rank	Points	Rank	Total	Rank
Zardo Domenios	3 m springboard	300.42	44	did not advance							

Women

Athlete	Event	Preliminaries		Semifinals				Final			
Athlete	Event	Points	Rank	Points	Rank	Total	Rank	Points	Rank	Total	Rank
Sheila Mae Perez	3 m springboard	223.65	32	did not advance							

== Equestrian ==
In total, one Filipino athletes participated in the equestrian events – Toni Leviste in the Individual jumping.

Athlete	Horse	Event	Qualification								Final					Total	
Athlete	Horse	Event	Round 1		Round 2			Round 3			Round A		Round B			Total	
Athlete	Horse	Event	Penalties	Rank	Penalties	Total	Rank	Penalties	Total	Rank	Penalties	Rank	Penalties	Total	Rank	Penalties	Rank
Toni Leviste	Ghandy	Individual jumping	14.75	=47 Q	20.75	35.50	=61 Q	20	55.50	61	did not advance						

== Rowing ==
In total, one Filipino athlete participated in the rowing events – Benjamin Tolentino in the men's single sculls.

Athlete	Event	Heats		Repechage		Semifinals		Final	
Athlete	Event	Time	Rank	Time	Rank	Time	Rank	Time	Rank
Benjamin Tolentino	Men's single sculls	7:29.86	5 R	7:29.03	4 C/D	7:29.86	4 D	7:22.31	18

== Shooting ==
In total, one Filipino athletes participated in the shooting events – Rasheya Jasmin Luis in the women's 10 metre air rifle.

Athlete	Event	Qualification		Final		
Athlete	Event	Points	Rank	Points	Total	Rank
Rasheya Jasmin Luis	Women's 10 metre air rifle	384	44	did not advance		

== Swimming ==
In total, four Filipino athletes participated in the swimming events – Marie-Lizza Danila in the women's 100 m backstroke, Jenny Rose Guerrero in the women's 100 m breaststroke and the women's 200 m breaststroke, Miguel Mendoza in the men's 400 m freestyle and Juan Carlos Piccio in the men's 1,500 m freestyle and the men's 400 m individual medley.

Athlete	Event	Heat		Semifinal		Final	
Athlete	Event	Time	Rank	Time	Rank	Time	Rank
Miguel Mendoza	Men's 400 m freestyle	4:00.66	36	—N/a		Did not advance	
Carlo Piccio	Men's 1500 m freestyle	15:51.57	34	—N/a		Did not advance	
Carlo Piccio	Men's 400 m individual medley	4:30.17	37	—N/a		Did not advance	
Lizza Danila	Women's 100 m backstroke	1:06.48	37	Did not advance			
Jenny Guerrero	Women's 100 m breaststroke	1:15.14	35	Did not advance			
Jenny Guerrero	Women's 200 m breaststroke	2:38.10	31	Did not advance			

== Taekwondo ==
In total, four Filipino athletes participated in the taekwondo events – Roberto Cruz in the men's –58 kg category, Eva Marie Ditan in the women's –49 kg category, Donald Geisler in the men's –80 kg category and Jasmin Strachan in the women's –57 kg category.

Athlete	Event	Round of 16	Quarterfinals	Semifinals	Repechage 1	Repechage 2	Final / BM	
Athlete	Event	Opposition Result	Opposition Result	Opposition Result	Opposition Result	Opposition Result	Opposition Result	Rank
Roberto Cruz	Men's –58 kg	Sagastume (GUA); W 4–(minus-1)	Taraburelli (ARG); L 5–7	did not advance				
Donald Geisler	Men's –80 kg	Livaja (SWE); L 4–4+	did not advance					
Eva Marie Ditan	Women's –49 kg	Güvenc (TUR); L 1–6	did not advance					
Jasmin Strachan	Women's –57 kg	Trần Hiếu Ngân (VIE); L 3–8	did not advance		Sankar (TRI); W 5+–5	Tosun (TUR); L 3–9	did not advance	

== See also ==
- Philippines at the 2000 Summer Paralympics
