= Trinidad and Tobago at the 2008 Summer Olympics =

- IOC code: TTO (TRI used at these Games)
- NOC: Trinidad and Tobago Olympic Committee
- Website: www.ttoc.org

in Beijing
- Competitors: 28 in 4 sports
- Flag bearers: George Bovell (opening); Richard Thompson (closing)
- Medals Ranked 47th: Gold 1 Silver 1 Bronze 0 Total 2

Summer Olympics appearances (overview)
- 1948; 1952; 1956; 1960; 1964; 1968; 1972; 1976; 1980; 1984; 1988; 1992; 1996; 2000; 2004; 2008; 2012; 2016; 2020; 2024

Other related appearances
- British West Indies (1960 S)

Trinidad and Tobago sent a delegation to compete at the 2008 Summer Olympics in Beijing, China. Its participation in the Beijing games marked its eighteenth Olympic appearance and fifteenth Summer Olympic appearance since its debut at the 1948 Summer Olympics in London, excluding its joint participation with Jamaica and Barbados in 1960 as the West Indies Federation. With 28 athletes, more Trinidadians had competed at the Olympics than in any other single Olympic Games in its history before Beijing. Athletes representing Trinidad and Tobago advanced past the preliminary or qualification rounds in twelve events and reached the final rounds in four of those events. Of those four events, silver medals were won in the men's 100 meters (by Richard Thompson) and in the men's 4x100 meters relay (by Keston Bledman, Marc Burns, Emmanuel Callender, Richard Thompson, and Aaron Armstrong, who participated in the first round only). The latter was upgraded to gold due to one member of the quartet that crossed the line first, Nesta Carter, testing positive for a banned substance, resulting in their disqualification. The nation's flag bearer at the opening ceremony that year was swimmer and Athens medalist George Bovell.

== Background ==
Trinidad and Tobago is a two-island nation in the Caribbean that lies close to South America. The nation has participated in the Olympics since the 1948 Summer Olympics in London, and has appeared at every Summer Olympics since then with the exception of the 1960 Summer Olympics in Rome, when it joined Jamaica and Barbados in a political union called the West Indies Federation. Overall, Trinidad and Tobago had participated in eighteen Olympic Games (15 Summer Olympics and 3 Winter Olympics) between its 1948 debut and its appearance at the Beijing Olympics in 2008, and its fifteenth Olympic game since its independence, which was in 1962. The Trinidadian delegation in Beijing comprised its largest delegation by far, with 28 athletes. The previous record included 19 athletes, which happened in 1968, 1972, 2000 and 2004. Between 1948 and 2008, Trinidad and Tobago accumulated 14 medals (one gold, five silver and eight bronze); two of those medals were won in Beijing (a silver in the men's 100 meters another in the men's 4x100 meters relay). Richard Thompson, a male track athlete, medaled in the men's 100 meters but also medaled as a member of the Trinidadian relay team. All Olympians participating in Beijing for Trinidad and Tobago, with the exception of Dexter St. Louis in table tennis, were planning as of the end of the Beijing Olympics to continue training for future Olympic Games.

Trinidad and Tobago's flagbearer at the opening ceremony was swimmer George Bovell, who won a bronze medal in the 2004 Athens Olympics as part of the Trinidadian delegation.

Trinidad and Tobago's athletes arrived in Beijing's Olympic Village early in August. The athletic contingent of Trinidad and Tobago's team arrived in Beijing from Finland on August 5, 2008, but spent only one night before leaving for a training camp in nearby South Korea. The athletics team returned on August 11. Sharpshooter Roger Daniel, along with the entirety of Trinidad and Tobago Olympic Committee's administrative and medical staff, had arrived in the Olympic Village by August 3, 2008.

== Medalists ==
Medal	Name	Sport	Event	Date
Silver	Richard Thompson	Athletics	Men's 100 m	August 16
Gold	Keston Bledman; Marc Burns; Emmanuel Callander; Richard Thompson	Athletics	Men's 4 × 100 m relay	August 22

== Athletics ==
=== Men's competition ===
==== Men's 100 meters ====
Then 23-year-old Darrel Brown, a sprinter from Arima on the island of Trinidad, participated on Trinidad and Tobago's behalf at the Beijing Olympics. His participation in Beijing marked his second Olympic appearance; he previously participated in the 2004 Summer Olympics in Athens as part of the men's 100 meters race. During the August 14 qualification round, Brown was placed in the fourth heat, finishing the event in 10.22 seconds and tying second-place finalist Pierre Browne of Canada. Browne and Brown finished behind Jamaica's Michael Frater (10.15 seconds), but ahead of Japan's Nobuharu Asahara (10.25 seconds). Out of the 80 athletes participating in the qualification round, Brown tied in seventh place with Browne and the United States' Tyson Gay. Brown progressed to the quarterfinal round.

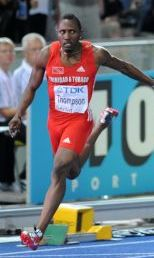
Richard Thompson, who earned gold in the 4x100 meters relay and silver in the 100 meters

Quarterfinals took place on August 15, and Brown was placed in the first heat. He finished the race in 10.93 seconds, finishing eighth of eighth athletes. He directly finished behind Poland's Dariusz Kuc (10.46 seconds). The leaders of the heat were Dutch Antilean Churandy Martina (9.99 seconds) and Jamaica's Frater (10.09 seconds). He finished last out of the 40 advancing athletes, and did not advance to semifinals.

Then 25-year-old Marc Burns, an Auburn University graduate from Port-of-Spain on Trinidad, represented Trinidad and Tobago in the 100 meters at Beijing. His participation marked his third Olympic Games (2000 Summer Olympics in Sydney and the 2004 Summer Olympics in Athens) and his second time running the event for Trinidad and Tobago. Burns raced during the August 14 qualification round in the ninth heat, where he completed his race in 10.46 seconds. Burns came in second and tied Slovenia's Matic Osovnikar, falling behind Qatari sprinter Samuel Adelebari Francis (10.40 seconds). Burns and Osovnikar finished ahead of Honduran athlete Cruz Rolando Palacios Castillo (10.49 seconds). Tying Osovnikar and Germany's Tobias Benjamin Unger for 38th place out of 80 athletes, Burns advanced to quarterfinals.

Burns was placed in the third heat during August 15 quarterfinals. He finished it in 10.05 seconds, taking first in the heat ahead of Kittitian athlete Kim Collins (10.07 seconds) and British athlete Tyrone Edgar (10.10 seconds). Francis, the leader of his qualification heat, took fourth place (10.11 seconds). Out of the forty quarterfinalists, Burns took sixth place. He advanced to semifinals.

Semifinals took place on August 16, and Burns was placed in the first heat. He ran his fastest time of the event during this race, completing the 100 meters in 9.97 seconds. Burns placed third behind the heat's leaders, Jamaica's Usain Bolt (9.85 seconds) and the United States' Walter Dix (9.95 seconds). Out of the sixteen semifinalists, Burns again placed sixth. He advanced to the final round, which took place later that day. Marc Burns finished the final round in 10.01 seconds and took seventh place, defeating the American Doc Patton (10.03 seconds) but falling behind Jamaica's Frater (9.97 seconds).

Then 24-year-old Trinidad-born sprinter and former Louisiana State University athlete Richard "Torpedo" Thompson also participated on Trinidad and Tobago's behalf at the Beijing Olympics' 100 meters race, marking his first appearance at any Olympic Games. On the August 14 qualification round, Thompson raced in the third heat and completed his race in 10.24 seconds. He placed first in his heat of eight athletes, defeating French runner Martial Mbandjock (10.26 seconds) and Italian athlete Simone Collio (10.32 seconds). Thompson tied Antigua and Barbuda's Daniel Bailey for 10th place out of 80 athletes, and advanced to quarterfinals.

The August 15 quarterfinals saw Thompson in the second heat, where he again took first place when he finished the race in 9.99 seconds. Thompson defeated the United States' Tyson Gay (10.09 seconds) and France's Mbandjock (10.16 seconds). This time, out of the forty quarterfinalists, Thompson tied the Netherlands Antilles' Martina for second place behind only Usain Bolt. Thompson advanced to semifinals.

Thompson competed in the second heat during the August 16 semifinal round. He finished the race in 9.93 seconds, placing second out of eight athletes. Jamaica's Asafa Powell took first (9.91 seconds), and Churandy Martina took third (9.94 seconds). Thompson placed third out of the sixteen semifinalists, moving forward to the final round. Richard Thompson completed the final race in 9.89 seconds and medaled silver. In the event, Bolt medaled gold with a world and Olympic record-breaking 9.69 seconds, and Walter Dix medaled bronze with a time of 9.91 seconds.

==== Men's 200 meters ====
Then 30-year-old Houston-born Olympian Aaron Armstrong, son of American Olympian Debra Armstrong (née Edwards) and Trinidadian Olympian Ainsley Armstrong, participated on Trinidad and Tobago's behalf at the men's 200 meters event. The qualification round of the event took place on August 17, and Armstrong was placed in the eighth heat. He finished the race in 20.57 seconds, ranking first out of the finishing seven athletes in his heat. Armstrong bested Antigua and Barbuda's Brendan Christian (20.58 seconds), who finished second, and Canada's Jared Connaughton, who finished third. Out of the 66 competing athletes, Armstrong ranked eighth. He advanced to quarterfinals.

Quarterfinals took place on August 18, and Armstrong competed in the third heat, tying fourth-place finalist Marcin Jędrusiński with a time of 20.58 seconds. Armstrong and Jedrusinski fell behind Belgium's Kristof Beyens (20.50 seconds) but placed ahead of Nigeria's Obinna Metu (20.65 seconds). The leaders of the heat were Antigua and Barbuda's Christian (20.26 seconds) and the Netherlands Antilles' Churandy Martina (20.42 seconds). Overall, Armstrong placed 19th out of 32 qualifying quarterfinalists. He did not progress further.

Then 22-year-old Siparia, Trinidad-born runner Rondel Sorrillo participated on Trinidad and Tobago's behalf in the men's 200 meters dash, marking his first participation in any Olympic Games. Sorillo participated in the fifth heat of the August 17 qualification round, placing first in his heat with a time of 20.58 seconds. Sorillo defeated Usain Bolt (20.64 seconds) and Kristof Beyens (20.69 seconds), the second and third-place finalists in his heat. Out of the 66 event competitors, Sorillo tied Japan's Shinji Takahira and Antigua and Barbuda's Brendan Christian for ninth place. Sorillo advanced to the next round.

In the August 18 quarterfinals, Sorillo was placed in the fourth heat. He completed his event in 20.63 seconds, placing fourth out of the seven finishing athletes in his heat. Sorillo placed just behind Norway's Jaysuma Saidy Ndure (20.45 seconds) and just ahead of Azerbaijan's Ramil Guliyev (20.66 seconds). The leaders of Sorillo's heat were Ireland's Paul Hession (20.32 seconds) and the United States' Wallace Spearmon (20.39 seconds). Out of the 32 quarterfinalists, Sorillo tied Takahira for 21st place. He did not advance further.

==== Men's 400 meters ====
Then 29-year-old Trinidadian Ato Modibo, a former athlete of Clemson University and the husband of Caymanian sprinter Cydonie Mothersille, marked his third Olympic appearance (after the 2000 Sydney and 2004 Athens Olympics) upon his participation in Beijing. Modibo represented Trinidad and Tobago in the men's 400 meters dash as an Olympian for the third time. During the August 17 qualification round, Modibo was placed in the fifth heat. He completed the event in 45.63 seconds, placing fifth out of eight athletes in his heat. Modibo defeated Alleyne Francique of Grenada (46.15 seconds), but fell behind Belgium's Jonathan Borlée (45.25 seconds). The leaders of Modibo's heat were LaShawn Merritt (44.96 seconds), Nigeria's Saul Weigopwa (45.19 seconds) and Italy's Claudio Licciardello (45.25 seconds). Out of 56 athletes, Modibo ranked 26th. He did not advance to later rounds.

Then 20-year-old Tobago-born runner Renny "Chicken" Quow participated in the Beijing Olympics' men's 400 meters dash for the Trinidadian delegation, his first participation at any Olympic Games. Quow trained with the athletics program at South Plains College in Levelland, Texas prior to Beijing. The 400 meters qualification round, which took place on August 17, saw Quow participating in the sixth heat. He completed the run in 45.13 seconds, placing second. Andrew Steele of Great Britain (44.94 seconds) was the only athlete in the heat to place ahead of him. Michael Mathieu of the Bahamas (45.17 seconds) placed directly behind Quow. Renny Quow advanced to semifinals, placing ninth out of 56 athletes.

The semifinal round took place on August 19. Competing in the third heat, Quow ran his event in 44.82 seconds, placing fourth in his event. Quow ranked directly ahead of Senga Gary Kikaya of the Democratic Republic of the Congo (44.94 seconds) and directly behind Johan Wissman of Sweden (44.64 seconds). Quow's heat's leaders included LaShawn Merritt of the United States (44.12 seconds) and Martyn Rooney of the United Kingdom (44.60 seconds). Quow placed seventh place out of the 24 semifinalists. He advanced to finals. During the final round, Quow finished seventh after completing the event in a time of 45.22 seconds, defeating Wissman (45.39 seconds) but falling behind Rooney (45.12 seconds).

==== Men's 110 meters hurdles ====
Then 20-year-old University of Kentucky athlete Mikel Thomas participated at Beijing on Trinidad and Tobago's behalf in the men's 110 meters hurdles, and was the only Olympic Trinidadian hurdler at the 2008 Olympics. Beijing marked the first time he appeared at the Olympics. Thomas competed in the August 17 qualification round's second heat, finishing the event in 13.69 seconds and ranking sixth out of seven athletes. Thomas placed behind South Korea's Lee Jung-Joon (13.65 seconds) and ahead of Slovenia's Damjan Zlatnar (13.84 seconds). The leaders of Thomas' heat were American David Oliver (13.30 seconds), Spaniard Jackson Quiñónez (13.41 seconds) and Bahamian Shamar Sands (13.45 seconds). Thomas ranked 27th out of 43 athletes. He progressed to the quarterfinal round.

The August 19 quarterfinal round placed Thomas in the first heat. Completing his event in 13.62 seconds, he ranked sixth out of the eight athletes in his heat. Thomas placed ahead of Russia's Igor Peremota (13.70 seconds) and behind Jamaica's Richard Phillips (13.48 seconds). The leaders of Thomas' quarterfinals heat were the United States' David Payne (13.24 seconds) and the Czech Republic's Petr Svoboda (13.41 seconds). Out of the 32 quarterfinalists, Thomas ranked 20th. He did not advance further.

==== Men's 4 × 100 meters relay ====
Trinidad and Tobago submitted a team to participate in the 4×100 meters relay. Although each relay consists of four people, five Trinidadians were involved between both the first and second (final) round. During the first round, Trinidad and Tobago participated in the first heat, which consisted of then 20-year-old Port-of-Spain-born Keston Bledman, who only participated in the relay; Marc Burns, who also participated in the men's 100 meters; Richard Thompson, who also medaled in the men's 100 meters; and Aaron Armstrong, who also ran in the men's 200 meters. The relay ran the collective 400 meters in 38.26 seconds, placing first in the first heat during the August 21 semifinal (and first) round. Trinidad and Tobago defeated Japan, which placed second in the heat (at 38.52 seconds) and the Netherlands, which placed third (38.87 seconds). The Trinidadian team placed first overall out of the ten relays that finished, and progressed to the August 22 final round.

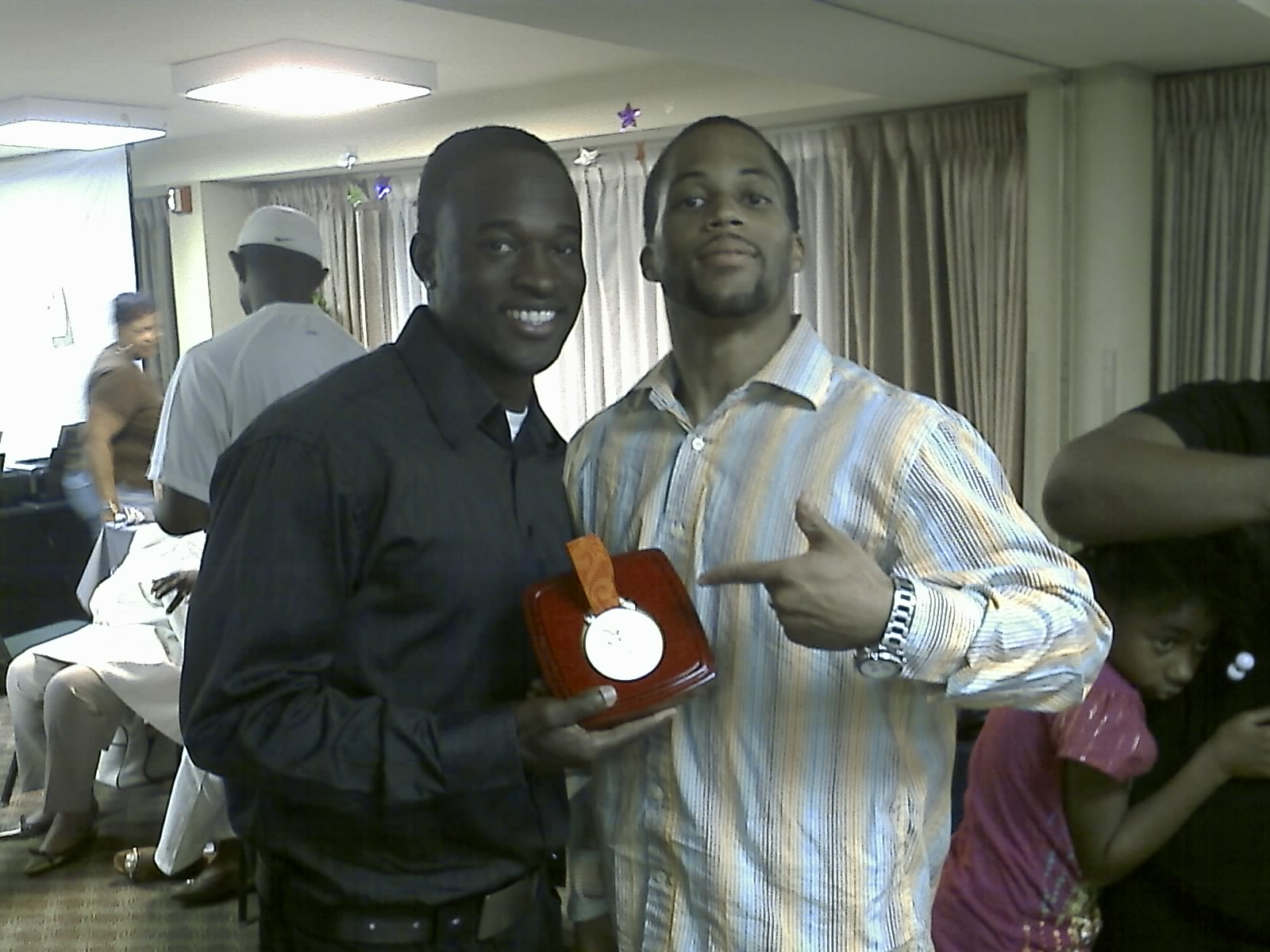
Aaron Armstrong (left) holding the silver medal he was originally awarded for his participation in the 4×100 meters relay

In the final round, Aaron Armstrong did not participate. He was replaced by then 24-year-old Emmanuel Callander, who was born in northern Trinidad and who did not participate in any event besides the relay. Burns, Thompson and Bledman remained. During the final round, Trinidad and Tobago finished the relay in 38.06 seconds, originally earning a silver medal behind the Jamaican team (37.10 seconds), which set an Olympic and a world record with its performance. Jamaica was subsequently stripped of their gold medal due to doping charges and Trinidad and Tobago was awarded the gold. The Japanese team (38.15 seconds) earned the bronze medal—later promoted to silver—in the event, placing immediately behind Trinidad and Tobago.

==== Men's 4 × 400 meters relay ====
Trinidad and Tobago sent a team to participate in the men's 4x400 meters relay. The team included Ato Modibo, the only athlete in the event who also participated in an individual event; then 19-year-old University of Memphis-affiliated athlete Jovon Toppin; then 22-year-old Clemson University-affiliated sprinter Cowin Mills; and then 22-year-old University of Michigan runner Stann Waithe. The team competed in the second heat of the August 22 semifinals (the first round), finishing the race in 3:04.12 and placing fifth out of the eight heat teams. Trinidad and Tobago defeated Japan (3:04.18) but fell behind Germany (3:03.49). The leaders of the Trinidadian heat included Great Britain (2:59.33) and the Bahamas (2:59.88). Out of the 19 competing relays, Trinidad and Tobago ranked 13th. Its relay did not progress to finals.

==== Summary ====
Twelve male athletes participated on Trinidad and Tobago's track and field team. Of those, three participated in the 100 meters race (Darrel Brown, Marc Burns and Richard Thompson), two participated in the 200 meters race (Aaron Armstrong and Rondel Sorrillo), two participated in the 400 meters race (Ato Modibo and Renny Quow) and one participated in the 110 meters hurdles (Mikel Thomas). Five athletes did not participate in individual events. Of those, two participated in the 4 × 100 relay (Emmanuel Callender and Keston Bledman, who ran with Burns and Thompson) and three participated in the 4 × 400 relay (Jovon Toppin, Cowin Mills and Stann Waithe, who participated along with Modibo).

Key

- Note–Ranks given for track events are within the athlete's heat only
- Q = Qualified for the next round
- q = Qualified for the next round as a fastest loser or, in field events, by position without achieving the qualifying target
- NR = National record
- N/A = Round not applicable for the event
- Bye = Athlete not required to compete in round

Men

Athlete	Event	Heat		Quarterfinal		Semifinal		Final	
Athlete	Event	Result	Rank	Result	Rank	Result	Rank	Result	Rank
Darrel Brown	100 m	10.22	3 Q	10.93	8	Did not advance			
Marc Burns	100 m	10.46	2 Q	10.05	1 Q	9.97	3 Q	10.01	7
Richard Thompson	100 m	10.24	1 Q	9.99	1 Q	9.93	2 Q	9.89	2nd place, silver medalist(s)
Aaron Armstrong	200 m	20.57	1 Q	20.58	5	Did not advance			
Rondel Sorrillo	200 m	20.58	1 Q	20.63	4	Did not advance			
Ato Modibo	400 m	45.63	5	—N/a		Did not advance			
Renny Quow	400 m	45.13	2 Q	—N/a		44.82	4 q	45.22	7
Mikel Thomas	110 m hurdles	13.69	6 q	13.62	6	Did not advance			
Aaron Armstrong*; Keston Bledman; Marc Burns; Emmanuel Callender**; Richard Thompson	4 × 100 m relay	38.26	1 Q	—N/a				38.06	2nd place, silver medalist(s)
Cowin Mills; Ato Modibo; Renny Quow; Jovon Toppin; Stann Waithe	4 × 400 m relay	3:04.12	5	—N/a				Did not advance	

* Competed in the heats only
** Competed in the finals only

=== Women's competition ===
==== Women's 100 meters ====
Then 19-year-old Lincoln University athlete Semoy Hackett participated on behalf of Trinidad and Tobago in the women's 100 meter race. Her appearance in Beijing marked the first time she appeared at any Olympic Games. Hackett participated in the fourth heat during the August 15 qualification round. With a time of 11.52 seconds, Hackett ranked fourth out of the eight athletes in her heat, placing ahead of the Côte d'Ivoire's Affoue Amandine Allou (11.75 seconds) and behind Lithuania's Lina Grincikaite (11.43 seconds). The leaders of Hackett's heat were the Bahamas' Chandra Sturrup (11.30 seconds) and Trinidad and Tobago's own Kelly-Ann Baptiste (11.39 seconds). Hackett ranked 31st overall out of 85 athletes. She advanced to the quarterfinals.

Hackett participated in the fourth heat during the August 16 quarterfinal round, finishing her race in 11.46 seconds. She defeated Uzbekistan's Guzel Khubbieva (11.49 seconds) and fell behind Tahesia Harrigan of the British Virgin Islands (11.36 seconds), placing sixth in a heat of eight athletes. Hackett's heat was led by Jamaica's Kerron Stewart (10.98 seconds) and the United States' Lauryn Williams (11.07 seconds). She placed 25th out of the 40 qualifying athletes. Hackett did not progress further.

Trinidad-born runner Sasha Springer-Jones, who was 30 years old at the time, competed in the women's 100 meters in Beijing on Trinidad and Tobago's behalf as well. Springer-Jones had not previously appeared at any Olympic Games. Springer-Jones was placed in the eighth heat during the August 15 qualification round, completing the event in 11.55 seconds. Ranking fifth, she defeated Papua New Guinea's Mae Koime (11.68 seconds) but fell behind Colombia's Yomara Hinestroza (11.39 seconds). The leaders of Springer-Jones' heat were Nigeria's Damola Osayomi (11.13 seconds) and the Bahamas' Debbie Ferguson-McKenzie (11.17 seconds). She tied Natalia Murinovich of Russia for 32nd place out of the 85 participants, and progressed to quarterfinals.

During the August 16 quarterfinals, Springer-Jones participated in the fifth heat. She finished her event in 11.71 seconds and finished last in her heat of eight athletes. Paulette Ruddy Zang Milama of Gabon (11.59 seconds) ranked just ahead of Springer-Jones. The heat was led by American runner Torri Edwards (11.31 seconds) and Lithuanian sprinter Grincikaite (11.33 seconds). She ranked last out of the 40 qualifying athletes, and did not progress to further rounds.

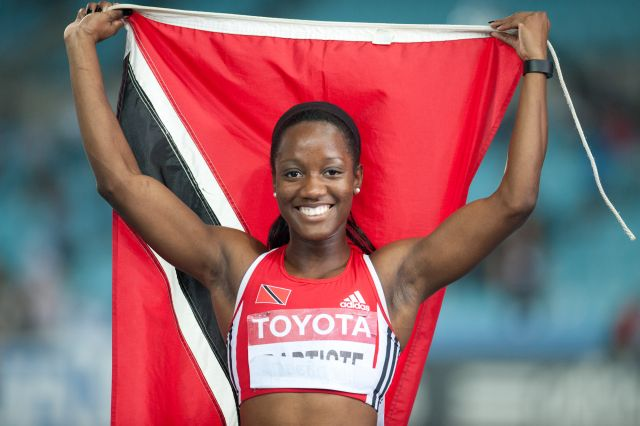
Kelly-Ann Baptiste, who participated for Trinidad and Tobago in Beijing

Tobago-born Louisiana State University sprinter Kelly-Ann Baptiste ran for Trinidad and Tobago in the women's 100 meters dash. She had previously participated in the 2004 Summer Olympics at Athens at age 17, and participated in Beijing while 21 years old. During the August 15 qualification round, Baptiste was placed in the fourth heat, where she finished the event in 11.39 seconds. She placed second, falling behind Bahamian sprinter Chandra Sturrup (11.30 seconds) but ranking ahead of Lithuania's Lina Grincikaite (11.43 seconds). Baptiste tied Colombia's Yomara Hinestroza for 17th place out of the 85 participating athletes. She progressed to the quarterfinals.

During the August 16 quarterfinals, Baptiste finished sixth in the second heat after achieving a time of 11.42 seconds. This placed her ahead of Russia's Natalia Murinovich (11.51 seconds) and behind Cuba's Virgen Benavides (11.40 seconds). The leaders of Baptiste's quarterfinal heat were Jamaica's Sherone Simpson (11.02 seconds) and the United States' Muna Lee (11.08 seconds). Baptiste placed 22nd out of the 40 quarterfinal-qualifying athletes, ranking the highest out of all Trinidadian athletes in the quarterfinal round. She did not progress to semifinals.

==== Women's 100 meters hurdles ====
Then 21-year-old Penn State University athlete Aleesha Barber was the sole Trinidadian participant in the women's 100 meters hurdles race. Her participation in the event marked the first time she participated at any Olympic Games. Barber participated in the August 17 preliminary rounds, where she was placed in the fifth heat. She finished the event in 13.01 seconds and placed fourth out of the seven finishing athletes in her heat. Yevgeniya Snihur of Ukraine (13.06 seconds) ranked behind her, while Anastassiya Pilipenko of Kazakhstan (12.99 seconds) ranked ahead of her. Jamaica's Brigitte Foster-Hylton (12.69 seconds) and the United States' Dawn Harper (12.73 seconds) led Barber's preliminary heat, with Harper eventually winning gold. Out of the 40 athletes in the event, Barber ranked 18th. She did not advance to later rounds.

==== Women's 400 meters hurdles ====
Then 24-year-old runner Josanne Lucas, who was born in the largest town on Tobago, was the sole participating Trinidadian athlete in the women's 400 meters hurdles at the Beijing Olympics. Lucas' participation in the event marked the first time she participated on the Olympic level. The qualification round for Lucas' event was on August 17, during which she was placed in the fourth heat. Lucas finished the event in 57.76 seconds. This placed her at sixth out of the seven heat athletes, ahead of Spain's Laia Forcadell (58.64 seconds) and behind Sudan's Muna Durka (57.16 seconds). The leaders of her heat were Russia's Ekaterina Bikert (55.15 seconds) and Poland's Anna Jesień (55.35 seconds). Out of the 27 competitors during the qualifying round, Lucas ranked 23rd. She did not advance to later rounds.

==== Women's long jump ====
Then 20-year-old University of California, Los Angeles long jumper Rhonda Watkins competed on Trinidad and Tobago's behalf as the only Trinidadian long jumper in Beijing. Watkins had not previously competed in any Olympic event. During the qualification round, which took place on August 18, Watkins participated in the first heat. She completed a jump of 5.88 meters, placing 18th out of a heat that included 21 athletes; of that group, 19 ranked. She ranked ahead of Belize's Tricia Flores (5.25 meters) and behind the Republic of the Congo's Pamela Mouele-Mboussi (6.06 meters). The heat leaders were Brazil's Maurren Higa Maggi (6.79 meters) and Sweden's Carolina Klüft (6.70 meters). Overall, Watkins ranked 37th out of the 38 ranking athletes (and 42 involved athletes). She did not advance to the final round.

==== Women's shot put ====
Then 29-year-old Trinidad-born field athlete Cleopatra Borel-Brown participated in women's shot put on Trinidad and Tobago's behalf in Beijing. Previously an athlete and student of the University of Maryland, Baltimore County, Borel-Brown also participated for Trinidad and Tobago in the 2004 Athens Olympics. The qualifying round of the event, which took place on August 15, placed her in the second heat. She put the shot at a distance of 17.96 meters, placing her at seventh place out of the 17 heat athletes. Borel-Brown ranked behind the United States' Michelle Carter (18.49 meters) and ahead of Italy's Assunta Legnante (17.76 meters). The leaders of Borel-Brown's heat included China's Gong Lijiao (19.46 meters) and Belarus' Nadzeya Ostapchuk (19.08 meters). Overall, Borel-Brown ranked 17th out of 33 ranking athletes. She did not progress to the final round.

==== Women's hammer throw ====
University of Florida athlete and then 27-year-old Candice Scott participated in women's hammer throw during the Beijing Olympics for Trinidad and Tobago. Scott previously appeared in the 2004 Athens Olympics, participating in the same event for Trinidad and Tobago's delegation. The qualification round for women's hammer throw took place on August 17, where Candice Scott participated in the second heat. Scott threw a metal ball 63.03 meters, placing 19th out of the 23 athletes who placed a score. Poland's Malgorzata Zadura (64.13 meters) placed ahead of her, while Spain's Berta Castells (62.44 meters) placed behind. China's Zhang Wenxiu (73.36 meters) and France's Manuela Montebrun (72.81 meters) led the heat. Out of the 47 placing athletes, Scott ranked in 40th place. She did not advance to the final round.

==== Women's 4x100 meters relay ====
Trinidad and Tobago sent a team to participate in the women's 4x100 meters relay. The team was composed of Kelly-Ann Baptiste and Semoy Hackett–both of whom also participated in the women's 100 meters dash–as well as then 30-year-old University of Nevada, Las Vegas athlete and three-time Olympian Ayanna Hutchinson and then 23-year-old Abilene Christian University athlete and two-time Olympian Wanda Hutson–both of whom did not compete in an event other than the relay while in Beijing. Monique Cabral of Louisiana State University was the reserve and did not compete. The team competed in the August 21 semifinals (the first round) while in the second heat. The Trinidadian relay, however, did not finish the event, and was one of three teams in its heat (alongside France and Ukraine) that did not rank. The team did not finish because the first exchange, between Michelle-Lee Ahye and Kelly-Ann Baptiste, was not completed.

==== Summary ====
Ten athletes composed Trinidad and Tobago's female track and field team. Of those, three participated only in individual track events (Sasha Springer-Jones, Aleesha Barber, Josanne Lucas); three participated in individual field events (Rhonda Watkins, Cleopatra Borel-Brown, and Candice Scott); two participated in only team track events (Wanda Hutson and Ayanna Hutchinson); and two participated in both individual and team track events (Kelly-Ann Baptiste and Semoy Hackett). No medalists came from the Trinidadian female track and field team in Beijing, although all 100 meters sprinters progressed to quarterfinals.

Key

- Note–Ranks given for track events are within the athlete's heat only
- Q = Qualified for the next round
- q = Qualified for the next round as a fastest loser or, in field events, by position without achieving the qualifying target
- NR = National record
- N/A = Round not applicable for the event
- Bye = Athlete not required to compete in round

Women
Track & road events

Athlete	Event	Heat		Quarterfinal		Semifinal		Final	
Athlete	Event	Result	Rank	Result	Rank	Result	Rank	Result	Rank
Kelly Ann Baptiste	100 m	11.39	2 Q	11.42	6	Did not advance			
Semoy Hackett	100 m	11.53	4 q	11.46	6	Did not advance			
Sasha Springer-Jones	100 m	11.55	5 q	11.71	8	Did not advance			
Aleesha Barber	100 m hurdles	13.01 NR	4	—N/a		Did not advance			
Josanne Lucas	400 m hurdles	57.76	6	—N/a		Did not advance			
Kelly-Ann Baptiste; Semoy Hackett; Ayanna Hutchinson; Wanda Hutson	4 × 100 m relay	DNF		—N/a				Did not advance	

Field events

Athlete	Event	Qualification		Final	
Athlete	Event	Distance	Position	Distance	Position
Rhonda Watkins	Long jump	5.88	37	Did not advance	
Cleopatra Borel-Brown	Shot put	17.96	17	Did not advance	
Candice Scott	Hammer throw	63.03	40	Did not advance	

== Shooting ==
Then 38-year-old sharpshooter Roger Daniel, a two-time Olympian (participating in the men's air pistol 10 meters and the men's free pistol 50 meters at the 2004 Summer Olympics in Athens) and participant in the Trinidad and Tobago Defence Force, represented Trinidad and Tobago as its only shooter in Beijing by taking part in the men's air pistol 10 meters. In the first round, Daniel scored 98 points; in the second round, 95; in the third, 92; in the fourth, 94; in the fifth, 96; and the sixth and final, 96. Daniel tied four other athletes for the third greatest number of points in the first round, and received fewest points in the third round of any participating athlete. Overall, during the August 9 course of events, Daniel earned 571 points, ranking 37th out of the 49 participating athletes. The gold medalist in the event, China's Pang Wei, received 688.2 points, while the last place finalist Edirisinghe Senanayake of Sri Lanka received 561 points.

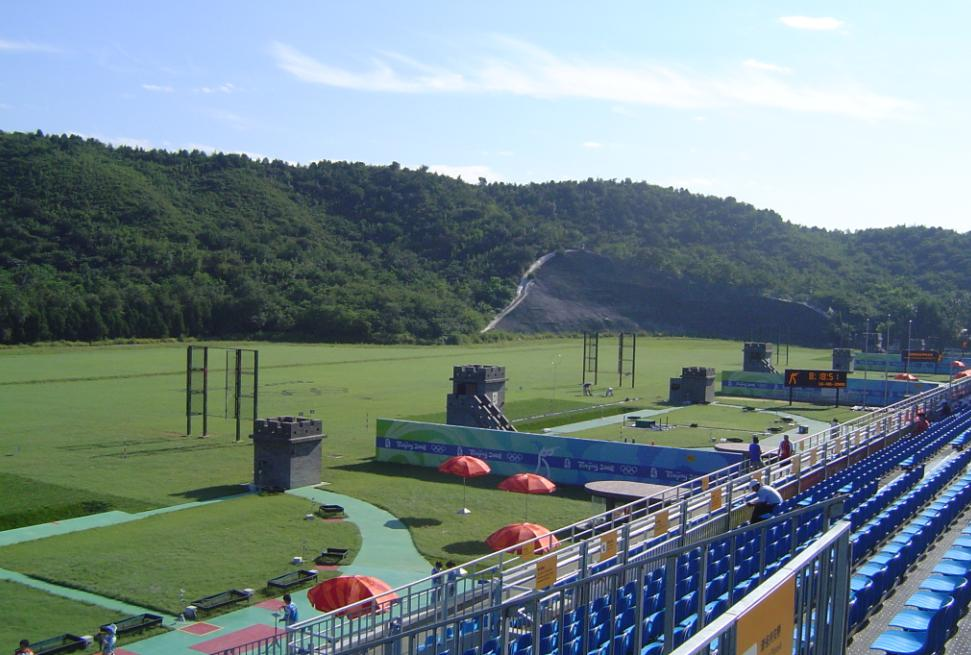
The Beijing Shooting Range Clay Target Field, where Daniel competed in his event.

Men

Athlete	Event	Qualification		Final	
Athlete	Event	Points	Rank	Points	Rank
Roger Daniel	10 m air pistol	571	37	Did not advance	

== Swimming ==
=== Men's competition ===
==== Men's 200 meters individual medley ====
Then 22-year-old Nicholas Bovell participated on Trinidad and Tobago's behalf at Beijing in the men's 200 meters individual medley. He is the son of Barbara Bishop, a Barbadian athlete and sprinter in the 1972 Summer Olympics, and brother of fellow Beijing swimmer George Bovell. Nicholas Bovell competed in the August 13 preliminaries, where he swam in the second heat. He completed the event in 2:03.90, placing fifth behind the Czech Republic's Tomas Fucik (2:02.85) and ahead of Turkey's Serkan Atasay (2:05.25). The leaders of Bovell's heat were Norway's Gard Kvale (2:01.52) and the Philippines' Miguel Molina (2:01.61). Out of the 47 competitors, Nicholas Bovell ranked 36th. He did not advance to later rounds.

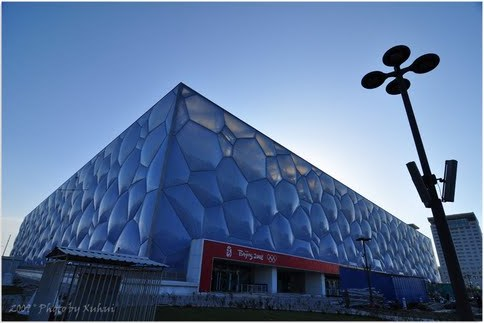
The Beijing National Aquatics Center, where the Bovell brothers and McLean competed in their events.

==== Men's 100 meters freestyle ====
Three-time Olympian George Bovell, aged 25 years old during his participation at Beijing, competed in the men's 100 meters freestyle for Trinidad and Tobago. Bovell previously competed in the 2000 Sydney Olympics (men's 100 meters freestyle and men's 200 meters individual medley) and in the 2004 Athens Olympics (men's 100 meters freestyle, men's 200 meters freestyle and men's 200 meters individual medley), earning a bronze medal in the men's 200 meters individual medley while in Athens. George Bovell participated in the sixth heat during the August 12 preliminary round, placing first with a time of 48.83 seconds. Venezuela's Albert Subirats Altes (48.97 seconds) placed second in the heat behind Bovell. Out of the 64 athletes participating in preliminaries, George Bovell ranked 20th. He did not advance to later rounds.

==== Men's 50 meters freestyle ====
George Bovell also competed in the men's 50 meters freestyle on Trinidad and Tobago's behalf. Bovell had not previously competed in the event, although he advanced further in it than in the men's 100 meters freestyle while in Beijing. During the August 14 preliminary round, George Bovell competed in the 11th heat. He swam the event in 21.77 seconds, placing second ahead of the United States' Garrett Weber-Gale (21.95 seconds) and behind Brazil's César Cielo Filho (21.47 seconds). Filho set an Olympic record during his participation in Bovell's preliminary heat. Out of the event's 97 participants, George Bovell placed sixth. He advanced to the semifinals.

Bovell competed in the first heat during the August 14 semifinal round. He finished the race in 21.86 seconds, placing sixth out of the eight heat athletes. George Bovell placed ahead of South Africa's Gideon Louw (21.97 seconds) and behind Croatia's Duje Draganja (21.85 seconds). The heat leaders were Brazil's Filho (21.34 seconds), who again set an Olympic record with his performance, and Sweden's Stefan Nystrand (21.71 seconds). Overall, George Bovell placed 11th out of the 16 progressing athletes. He did not advance to the final round.

=== Women's competition ===
==== Women's 50 meters freestyle ====
Then 24-year-old former University of South Carolina athlete Sharntelle McLean participated for Trinidad and Tobago in the women's 50 meters freestyle. Her participation in Beijing marked her second Olympic appearance (she previously swam in the same event at the 2004 Summer Olympics in Athens), and the only appearance of a female Trinidadian swimmer in Beijing. McLean participated in the August 15 preliminary round of her event, swimming in the seventh heat. She finished the race in 26.19 seconds, placing second out of eight heat athletes. Carolina Colorado of Columbia (26.11 seconds) defeated McLean for first place, while Eva Dobar of Hungary (26.33 seconds) placed behind her. Out of the 92 participating athletes, McLean tied Lithuania's Rugile Mileisyte for 39th place. She did not advance to later rounds.

Men

Athlete	Event	Heat		Semifinal		Final	
Athlete	Event	Time	Rank	Time	Rank	Time	Rank
George Bovell	50 m freestyle	21.77	6 Q	21.86	11	Did not advance	
George Bovell	100 m freestyle	48.83	20	Did not advance			
Nicholas Bovell	200 m individual medley	2:03.90	36	Did not advance			

Women

Athlete	Event	Heat		Semifinal		Final	
Athlete	Event	Time	Rank	Time	Rank	Time	Rank
Sharntelle McLean	50 m freestyle	26.19	39	Did not advance			

== Table tennis ==
Then 40-year-old Bordeaux-based table tennis player Dexter St. Louis represented Trinidad and Tobago at Beijing in men's singles table tennis. St. Louis previously represented Trinidad and Tobago in the 1996 Summer Olympics in Atlanta aged 28 St. Louis faced Canada's Wilson Zhang during the August 18 preliminary round, where the two faced off during the eighth match. In the first game, Zhang defeated St. Louis with a score of 11–6; in the second, 11–7; in the third, 12–10; and in the fourth, 11–4. Having won the majority of seven games, Zhang defeated St. Louis for the match. St. Louis did not advance to later rounds.

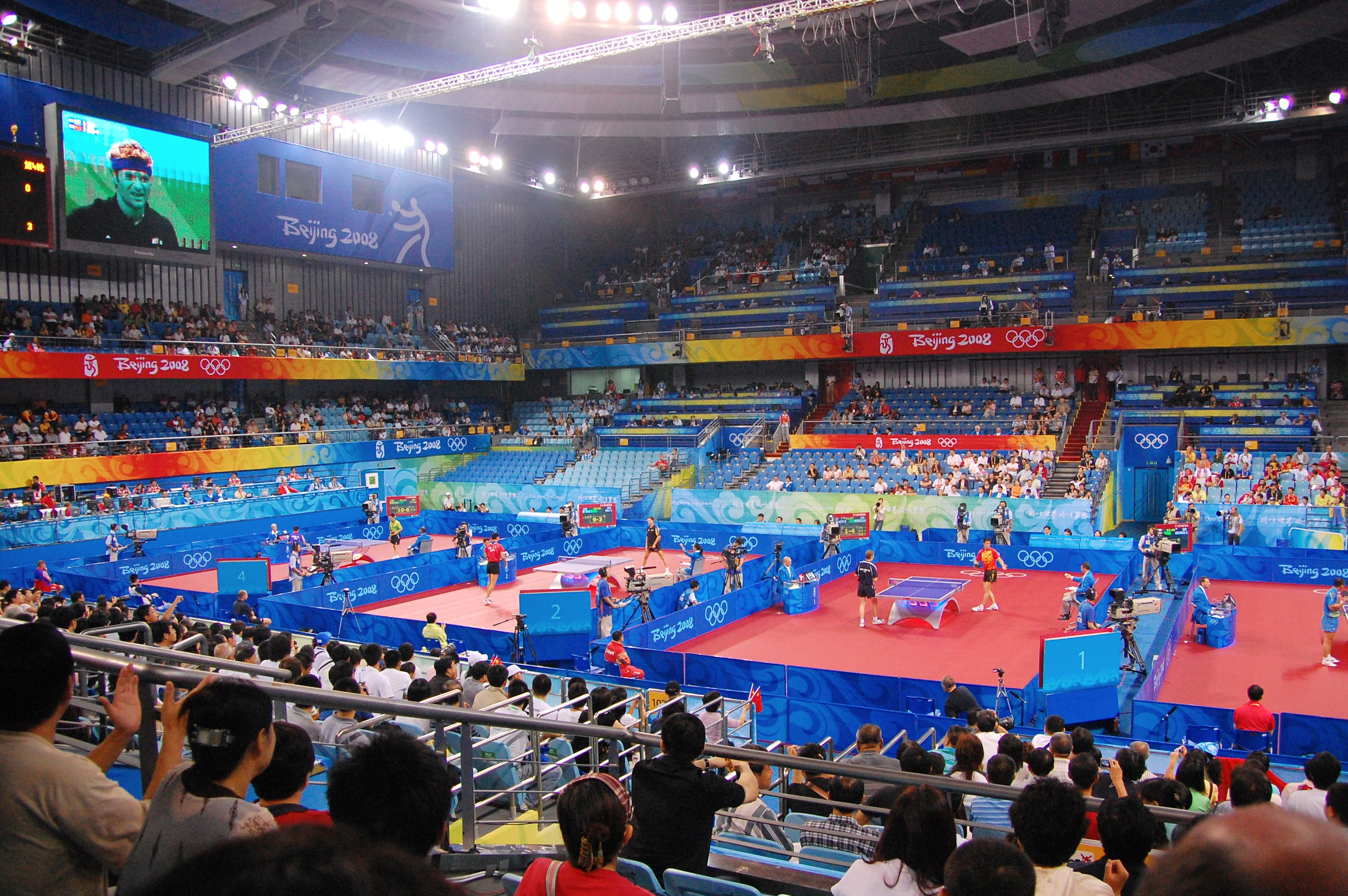
The Peking University Gymnasium, where St. Louis competed in his events.

Athlete	Event	Preliminary round	Round 1	Round 2	Round 3	Round 4	Quarterfinals	Semifinals	Final / BM	
Athlete	Event	Opposition Result	Opposition Result	Opposition Result	Opposition Result	Opposition Result	Opposition Result	Opposition Result	Opposition Result	Rank
Dexter St. Louis	Men's singles	Zhang P (CAN); L 0–4	Did not advance							

== See also ==
- Trinidad and Tobago at the 2007 Pan American Games
- Trinidad and Tobago at the 2010 Central American and Caribbean Games
