= Trinidad and Tobago at the 2000 Summer Olympics =

- IOC code: TTO (TRI used at these Games)
- NOC: Trinidad and Tobago Olympic Committee
- Website: www.ttoc.org

in Sydney
- Competitors: 19 in 3 sports
- Flag bearer: Ato Bolden
- Medals Ranked 61st: Gold 0 Silver 1 Bronze 1 Total 2

Summer Olympics appearances (overview)
- 1948; 1952; 1956; 1960; 1964; 1968; 1972; 1976; 1980; 1984; 1988; 1992; 1996; 2000; 2004; 2008; 2012; 2016; 2020; 2024

Other related appearances
- British West Indies (1960 S)

Trinidad and Tobago competed at the 2000 Summer Olympics in Sydney, Australia.

== Medalists ==
Medal	Name	Sport	Event	Date
Silver	Ato Boldon	Athletics	Men's 100 metres	23 September
Bronze	Ato Boldon	Athletics	Men's 200 metres	28 September

== Competitors ==
The following is the list of number of competitors in the Games.

Sport	Men	Women	Total
Athletics	12	3	15
Swimming	2	1	3
Taekwondo	0	1	1
Total	14	5	19

== Athletics ==
Key

- Note–Ranks given for track events are within the athlete's heat only
- Q = Qualified for the next round by position in race or, in field events, by achieving the automatic qualification target
- q = Qualified for the next round as a fastest loser or, in field events, by position without achieving the qualifying target

Men

Track and road events

Athlete	Event	Heat		Quarterfinal		Semifinal		Final	
Athlete	Event	Time	Rank	Time	Rank	Time	Rank	Time	Rank
Ato Boldon	100 m	10.04	1 Q	10.11	1 Q	10.13	3 Q	9.89	2nd place, silver medalist(s)
Nico Alexander	100 m	10.56	5	Did not advance					
Ato Boldon	200 m	20.52	1 Q	20.28	3 Q	20.20	3 Q	20.20	3rd place, bronze medalist(s)
Julieon Raeburn	200 m	21.21	6	Did not advance					
Ato Modibo	400 m	45.91	6	Did not advance					
Neil de Silva	400 m	46.84	4	Did not advance					
Steve Brown	110 m hurdles	13.92	5 q	14.12	8	Did not advance			
Nico Alexander; Ato Boldon (Semifinal); Marc Burns; Julian Raeburn; Jacey Harper (Heats)	4 × 100 m relay	39.12	3 q	—N/a		38.92	6	Did not advance	
Damion Barry; Simon Pierre; Neil De Silva; Ato Modibo	4 × 400 m relay	3:07.51	5	Did not advance					
Ronnie Holassie	Marathon	—N/a						2:19:24	32

Field events

Athlete	Event	Qualification		Final	
Athlete	Event	Result	Rank	Result	Rank
Melvin Lister	Long jump	7.22	46	—N/a	

Women

Track and road events

Athlete	Event	Heat		Quarterfinal		Semifinal		Final	
Athlete	Event	Time	Rank	Time	Rank	Time	Rank	Time	Rank
Ayanna Hutchinson	100 m	11.78	4	—N/a					
Fana Ashby	100 m	11.85	6	—N/a					

Combined events – Heptatlon

Athlete	Event	100H	HJ	SP	200 m	LJ	JT	800 m	Final	Rank
Marsha Mark	Event	13.72	1.66	11.44	25.35	5.90	48.99	02:32.36	5627	22
Marsha Mark	Points	1018	806	624	855	819	841	664	5627	22

== Swimming ==
Men

Athlete	Event	Heat		Semifinal		Final	
Athlete	Event	Time	Rank	Time	Rank	Time	Rank
George Bovell	100 m freestyle	52.90	59	Did not advance			
George Bovell	200 m individual medley	2:04.68	26	Did not advance			
George Bovell	400 m individual medley	4:29.52	36	—N/a		Did not advance	
Sebastien Paddington	200 m freestyle	1:55.40	47	Did not advance			

Women

Athlete	Event	Heat		Semifinal		Final	
Athlete	Event	Time	Rank	Time	Rank	Time	Rank
Siobhan Cropper	50 m freestyle	26.36	32	Did not advance			
Siobhan Cropper	100 m freestyle	57.90	34	Did not advance			
Siobhan Cropper	100 m butterfly	01:03.34	40	Did not advance			

== Taekwondo ==
Athlete	Event	Round of 16	Quarterfinals	Semifinals	Repechage Quarterfinals	Repechage Semifinals	Final / BM	
Athlete	Event	Opposition Result	Opposition Result	Opposition Result	Opposition Result	Opposition Result	Opposition Result	Rank
Cheryl Ann Sankar	Women's −57 kg	Ngan (VIE); L 0–2	Did not advance		Strachan (PHI); L 5–5+	Did not advance		

== See also ==
- Trinidad and Tobago at the 1999 Pan American Games

== Bibliography ==
- Wallechinsky, David (2004). The Complete Book of the Summer Olympics (Athens 2004 Edition). Toronto, Canada. ISBN 1-894963-32-6.
- International Olympic Committee (2001). The Results. Retrieved 12 November 2005.
- Sydney Organising Committee for the Olympic Games (2001). Official Report of the XXVII Olympiad Volume 1: Preparing for the Games. Retrieved 20 November 2005.
- Sydney Organising Committee for the Olympic Games (2001). Official Report of the XXVII Olympiad Volume 2: Celebrating the Games. Retrieved 20 November 2005.
- Sydney Organising Committee for the Olympic Games (2001). The Results. Retrieved 20 November 2005.
- International Olympic Committee Web Site
