= Taekwondo at the 2000 Summer Olympics – Women's 57 kg =

Taekwondo competition

Women's 57 kg at the Games of the XXVII Olympiad
- Venue: State Sports Centre
- Date: 28 September
- Competitors: 12 from 12 nations

Medalists
1st place, gold medalist(s)		Jung Jae-eun	South Korea
2nd place, silver medalist(s)		Tran Hieu Ngan	Vietnam
3rd place, bronze medalist(s)		Hamide Bıkçın Tosun	Turkey

The women's 57 kg competition in taekwondo at the 2000 Summer Olympics in Sydney took place on September 28 at the State Sports Centre.

South Korean fighter Jung Jae-eun yielded a 2–0 lead over her Vietnamese opponent Tran Hieu Ngan to capture her nation's first ever Olympic gold medal in the sport. Additionally, silver medalist Tran made history to become Vietnam's first ever Olympic medalist. Meanwhile, 1995 World champion Hamide Bıkçın Tosun of Turkey, who lost to Jung in the semifinal and whose delegation complained about alleged biased judging, regrouped to beat Netherlands' Virginia Lourens 7–5 for the bronze.

== Competition format ==
The main bracket consisted of a single elimination tournament, culminating in the gold medal match. The taekwondo fighters eliminated in earlier rounds by the two finalists of the main bracket advanced directly to the repechage tournament. These matches determined the bronze medal winner for the event.

== Schedule ==
All times are Greece Standard Time (UTC+2)

Date	Time	Round
Thursday, 28 September 2000	09:00; 11:30; 15:30; 20:30	Preliminary Round; Quarterfinals; Semifinals; Final

== Competitors ==
Athlete	Nation
Hamide Bıkçın Tosun	Turkey
Hsu Chih-ling	Chinese Taipei
Cynthia Cameron	Australia
Cristiana Corsi	Italy
Carmen Silva	Brazil
Jung Jae-eun	South Korea
Virginia Lourens	Netherlands
Areti Athanasopoulou	Greece
Shimaa Afifi	Egypt
Tran Hieu Ngan	Vietnam
Cheryl Ann Sankar	Trinidad and Tobago
Jasmin Strachan	Philippines

== Results ==
Legend

- PTG — Won by points gap
- SUP — Won by superiority
- OT — Won on over time (Golden Point)
- WO — Walkover

=== Main bracket ===
Preliminary round
Hsu Chih-ling (TPE)	6
Cynthia Cameron (AUS)	0
Cristiana Corsi (ITA)	5
Carmen Silva (BRA)	2
Areti Athanasopoulou (GRE)	7+
Shimaa Afifi (EGY)	7
Tran Hieu Ngan (VIE)	2
Cheryl Ann Sankar (TRI)	0

Quarterfinals
Hamide Bıkçın Tosun (TUR)	6
Hsu Chih-ling (TPE)	3
Cristiana Corsi (ITA)	1
Jung Jae-eun (KOR)	8
Virginia Lourens (NED)	8
Areti Athanasopoulou (GRE)	6
Tran Hieu Ngan (VIE)	8
Jasmin Strachan (PHI)	3

Semifinals
Hamide Bıkçın Tosun (TUR)	2
Jung Jae-eun (KOR)	3
Virginia Lourens (NED)	6
Tran Hieu Ngan (VIE)	9

Gold medal match
Jung Jae-eun (KOR)	2
Tran Hieu Ngan (VIE)	0

=== Repechage ===
Quarterfinals
Jasmin Strachan (PHI)	5+
Cheryl Ann Sankar (TRI)	5

Semifinals
Hamide Bıkçın Tosun (TUR)	9
Jasmin Strachan (PHI)	3
Virginia Lourens (NED)	6
Cristiana Corsi (ITA)	5

Bronze medal match
Hamide Bıkçın Tosun (TUR)	7
Virginia Lourens (NED)	5
