= Eva Marie Ditan =

Filipino taekwondo practitioner

Personal information
- Nationality: Filipino
- Born: 22 March 1978 (age 48)
- Height: 5 ft 2 in (157 cm)

Sport
- Sport: Taekwondo
- University team: DLSU Lady Archers
- Club: Las Piñas Taekwondo Gym
Medal record
Representing Philippines
Women's taekwondo
Asian Championships
Bronze medal – third place	1996 Melbourne	Finweight
Southeast Asian Games
Silver medal – second place	1997 Jakarta	Finweight
Bronze medal – third place	1999 Bandar Seri Begawan	Finweight
Silver medal – second place	2001 Kuala Lumpur	Finweight
Bronze medal – third place	2003 Hanoi	Finweight

Eva Marie Ditan (born 22 March 1978) is retired Filipino taekwondo athlete who represented the Philippines at the 2000 Summer Olympics in Sydney. She is also a three-time World Cup Taekwondo Championships medalist in 1998, 2001 and 2002.

Her first international stint began in 1996 where she won bronze medal at the Asian Taekwondo Championships in Melbourne, Australia. She then won another bronze at the World Taekwondo University in Russia that same year.

== Early life and education ==
Ditan comes from a family of taekwondo jins. Her sisters Katherin and Diana Lyn represented the Philippines in international competitions. Her uncle, Jimmy Martin, competed in the Asian championships. Her step-brother Arnold Baradi won a gold medal in the 1984 Asian Taekwondo Championships. She started learning taekwondo at the age of six. From grade school to college, she studied at De La Salle University and became a sports management major. In her time with DLSU, she won gold medals every season from 1996 to 1999, and also won the UAAP's MVP award and Female Athlete of the Year Award.

== Career ==
In 1996, Ditan won bronze medals at the 1996 Asian Taekwondo Championships and at that year's World University Taekwondo competition. At her first SEA Games in 1997, she won silver and later on won bronze in 1999. In 1998, she won the silver medal in the flyweight division at the World Cup Taekwondo in Sindelfingen, Germany.

In 1999, Ditan was able to qualify for the 2000 Summer Olympics through the Asian & Oceania Qualification Tournament held in Manila. She, her cousin Roberto Cruz, Donald Geisler, and Jasmin Strachan were the first four Filipino taekwondo jins to compete in the Olympics once taekwondo became an official sport. At the Olympics, she lost to Döndü Güvenç of Turkey in the first round 1–6.

A year later, Ditan won bronze at the World Cup Taekwondo in Ho Chi Minh, Vietnam. At the 2001 SEA Games, she won silver in the finweight division. She then reached the quarterfinals of the 2001 World Taekwondo Championships before losing a close match to Venezuelan jin Dalia Contreras. At the 2002 Asian Games, she competed in the 47 kg division, but lost in the second round of the competition to China's Wang Ying. In 2003, she took home the bronze during that year's SEA Games.

== Legacy ==
In 2017, Ditan was awarded by the De La Salle Alumni Association as a Sports Achievement Awardee for taekwondo.
