= 2000 European Taekwondo Championships =

Taekwondo competition

- Location: Patras, Greece
- Start date: 4 May
- End date: 7 May

The 2000 European Taekwondo Championships were held in Patras, Greece. The event took place from 4 to 7 May, 2000.

== Medal summary ==
* Host nation (Greece)

Rank	Nation	Gold	Silver	Bronze	Total
1	Turkey (TUR)	4	0	4	8
2	Germany (GER)	3	2	1	6
3	Greece (GRE)*	3	0	3	6
4	Russia (RUS)	3	0	0	3
5	Spain (ESP)	2	7	4	13
6	Netherlands (NED)	1	2	1	4
7	France (FRA)	0	2	2	4
8	Belarus (BLR)	0	1	2	3
8	Italy (ITA)	0	1	2	3
10	Sweden (SWE)	0	1	1	2
11	Croatia (CRO)	0	0	3	3
11	Denmark (DEN)	0	0	3	3
11	Finland (FIN)	0	0	3	3
14	Azerbaijan (AZE)	0	0	1	1
14	Hungary (HUN)	0	0	1	1
14	Yugoslavia (YUG)	0	0	1	1
Totals (16 entries)		16	16	32	64

=== Men ===
Event	Gold	Silver	Bronze
–54 kg	Juan Antonio Ramos; Spain	Christophe Civiletti; France	Miroslav Krklješ; Yugoslavia; Mert Tuncer; Turkey
–58 kg	Mijalis Murutsos; Greece	Miguel Toledo; Spain	Muhammed Ali Karataş; Germany; Josef Salim; Hungary
–62 kg	Erol Denk; Germany	Dennis Mollet; Netherlands	Shirwan Hasan; Denmark; Niyamaddin Pashayev; Azerbaijan
–67 kg	Ioanis Yeoryos; Greece	Martin Lagerberg; Sweden	Mika Tarhanen; Finland; Francisco Zas; Spain
–72 kg	Aziz Acharki; Germany	Thijs Oude Luttikhuis; Netherlands	Marcos Carreira; Spain; Christophe Négrel; France
–78 kg	Bekir Aydın; Turkey	Jon Garnika; Spain	Antonio Cutugno; Italy; Roman Livaja; Sweden
–84 kg	Faissal Ebnoutalib; Germany	Jon García Aguado; Spain	Kristijan Kralj; Croatia; Yasin Yağız; Turkey
+84 kg	Bahri Tanrıkulu; Turkey	Rubén Montesinos; Spain	Teemu Heino; Finland; Mijalis Kotsopulos; Greece

=== Women ===
Event	Gold	Silver	Bronze
–47 kg	Belén Asensio; Spain	Fadime Helvacıoğlu; Germany	Isabella Martinetti; Italy; Kadriye Selimoğlu; Turkey
–51 kg	Svetlana Noskova; Russia	Jennifer Delgado; Spain	Aimee Bungalembun; Netherlands; Hanne Poulsen; Denmark
–55 kg	Hamide Bıkçın Tosun; Turkey	Gwladys Épangue; France	Gemma Magría; Spain; Ivona Skelin; Croatia
–59 kg	Virginia Lourens; Netherlands	Sonia Reyes; Spain	Lila Halkjær; Denmark; Zeynep Murat; Turkey
–63 kg	Ayşenur Taşbakan; Turkey	İnci Taşyürek; Germany	Luisa Arnanz; Spain; Kaliopi Papaioannu; Greece
–67 kg	Yekaterina Nazarova; Russia	Elena Benítez; Spain	Morfu Drosidu; Greece; Ksenia Tschucha; Belarus
–72 kg	Elisávet Mystakidu; Greece	Alesia Cherniavskaya; Belarus	Veera Liukkonen; Finland; Valérie Wiet-Henin; France
+72 kg	Mariya Koniajina; Russia	Daniela Castrignanò; Italy	Nataša Vezmar; Croatia; Mariya Zhuravskaya; Belarus
