= Tsai Pei-shan =

Taiwanese taekwondo practitioner

Personal information
- Nationality: Taiwanese
- Born: 17 June 1978 (age 48)

Sport
- Sport: Taekwondo
Medal record
Representing Chinese Taipei
Women's taekwondo
World Championships
Bronze medal – third place	1993 New York City	Welterweight
Asian Championships
Silver medal – second place	2000 Hong Kong	-72 kg

Tsai Pei-shan (born 17 June 1978) is a Taiwanese taekwondo practitioner. She won a bronze medal in welterweight at the 1993 World Taekwondo Championships. She won a silver medal at the 2000 Asian Taekwondo Championships.
