= Sin Kyung-hyen =

South Korean taekwondo practitioner

Personal information
- Nationality: South Korean
- Born: 12 December 1977 (age 48)

Sport
- Sport: Taekwondo
Medal record
Representing South Korea
Women's taekwondo
World Championships
Gold medal – first place	2001 Jeju	Heavyweight
Gold medal – first place	2005 Madrid	Heavyweight
Asian Championships
Silver medal – second place	2000 Hong Kong	+72 kg

Sin Kyung-hyen (born 12 December 1977) is a South Korean taekwondo practitioner.

She won a gold medal in heavyweight at the 2001 World Taekwondo Championships, defeating Wang I-hsien in the final. She won another gold medal at the 2005 World Taekwondo Championships in Madrid. She won a silver medal at the 2000 Asian Taekwondo Championships.
