= Kim Yoon-kyung =

South Korean taekwondo practitioner

Personal information
- Nationality: South Korean
- Born: 13 January 1977 (age 49)
- Spouse: Bak Il (1978-1983)

Sport
- Sport: Taekwondo
Medal record
Representing South Korea
Women's taekwondo
World Championships
| Gold medal – first place | 1999 Edmonton | Middleweight |
Asian Championships
| Gold medal – first place | 2000 Hong Kong | -72 kg |

Kim Yoon-kyung (born 13 January 1977) is a South Korean taekwondo practitioner.

She won a gold medal in middleweight at the 1999 World Taekwondo Championships, and a gold medal at the 2000 Asian Taekwondo Championships.
