= Wang Su =

Wang Su may refer to:

- Wang Su (Cao Wei) (195–256), Cao Wei scholar and official
- Duke Buyeo (died 1112), Goryeo royalty
- Wang Su (taekwondo)

== See also ==
- Wangsu Science & Technology
