= Kiyoteru Higuchi =

Japanese taekwondo practitioner

Personal information
- Nationality: Japanese
- Born: March 22, 1981 (age 45) Aso, Kumamoto, Japan

Sport
- Sport: Taekwondo
Medal record
Representing Japan
Men's taekwondo
World Championships
Bronze medal – third place	2001 Jeju	-62
Asian Championships
Bronze medal – third place	2000 Hong Kong	-58
Bronze medal – third place	2002 Amman	-62
Bronze medal – third place	2008 Henan	-67

Kiyoteru Higuchi (樋口 清輝, Higuchi Kiyoteru; born March 22, 1981) is a male Japanese Taekwondo practitioner. He won the bronze medal in the men's bantamweight division (-62 kg) at the 2001 World Taekwondo Championships held in Jeju City, South Korea. Higuchi competed at the 2000 Summer Olympics.
