= 1982 Asian Taekwondo Championships =

- Venue: Gay World Stadium
- Location: Singapore
- Dates: 9–11 December 1982

Champions
- Men: South Korea

The 1982 Asian Taekwondo Championships were the 5th edition of the Asian Taekwondo Championships, and were held in Singapore from 9 to 11 December, 1982.

== Medal summary ==
Event	Gold	Silver	Bronze
Finweight (−48 kg)	Choi Cheon; South Korea	Wang Ching-shan; Chinese Taipei	Numchook Dangput; Thailand
Finweight (−48 kg)	Choi Cheon; South Korea	Wang Ching-shan; Chinese Taipei	Kenny Couch; Australia
Flyweight (−52 kg)	Kwon Ki-moon; South Korea	Chih Hong-jong; Chinese Taipei	Tanad Boonsuwan; Thailand
Flyweight (−52 kg)	Kwon Ki-moon; South Korea	Chih Hong-jong; Chinese Taipei	Abdullah Razak; Kuwait
Bantamweight (−56 kg)	Kim Yong-ki; South Korea	Amnat Niemtong; Thailand	Wang Chi-ho; Chinese Taipei
Bantamweight (−56 kg)	Kim Yong-ki; South Korea	Amnat Niemtong; Thailand	Tony Gibb; Australia
Featherweight (−60 kg)	Chang Myung-sam; South Korea	Abdullah Marzouk; Qatar	Chua Bee Whatt; Singapore
Featherweight (−60 kg)	Chang Myung-sam; South Korea	Abdullah Marzouk; Qatar	Khalil Aqil; Jordan
Lightweight (−64 kg)	Han Jae-koo; South Korea	Jeff Tamayo; Philippines	Yanchai Tantiratapong; Thailand
Lightweight (−64 kg)	Han Jae-koo; South Korea	Jeff Tamayo; Philippines	Aw Teng Poo; Singapore
Welterweight (−68 kg)	Wu Tsung-che; Chinese Taipei	Kwak Dong-soo; South Korea	Lo Yong Poo; Singapore
Welterweight (−68 kg)	Wu Tsung-che; Chinese Taipei	Kwak Dong-soo; South Korea	Abdulsamad Mustafa; Jordan
Light middleweight (−73 kg)	Oh Il-nam; South Korea	Chen Ho-chin; Chinese Taipei	Tatsuo Kobayashi; Japan
Light middleweight (−73 kg)	Oh Il-nam; South Korea	Chen Ho-chin; Chinese Taipei	Geoff Rees; Australia
Middleweight (−78 kg)	Lee Dong-jun; South Korea	Michael Stahl; Australia	Marzouk Nashi; Kuwait
Middleweight (−78 kg)	Lee Dong-jun; South Korea	Michael Stahl; Australia	Lee Yoke Keong; Malaysia
Light heavyweight (−84 kg)	Moon Jong-kook; South Korea	Kamon Pensrinukun; Thailand	Ricky Reyes; Philippines
Light heavyweight (−84 kg)	Moon Jong-kook; South Korea	Kamon Pensrinukun; Thailand	Bertrand Vairaaroa; Tahiti
Heavyweight (+84 kg)	Jang Seong-hwa; South Korea	Amnat Possawong; Thailand	Aied Khidr Al-Shammari; Qatar
Heavyweight (+84 kg)	Jang Seong-hwa; South Korea	Amnat Possawong; Thailand	Allan France; New Zealand

== Medal table ==
Rank	Nation	Gold	Silver	Bronze	Total
1	South Korea	9	1	0	10
2	Chinese Taipei	1	3	1	5
3	Thailand	0	3	3	6
4	Australia	0	1	3	4
5	Philippines	0	1	1	2
5	Qatar	0	1	1	2
7	Singapore	0	0	3	3
8	Jordan	0	0	2	2
8	Kuwait	0	0	2	2
10	Japan	0	0	1	1
10	Malaysia	0	0	1	1
10	New Zealand	0	0	1	1
10	Tahiti	0	0	1	1
Totals (13 entries)		10	10	20	40
