= 1978 Asian Taekwondo Championships =

Taekwondo competition

- Venue: Macpherson Stadium
- Location: Hong Kong
- Dates: 8–10 September 1978

Champions
- Men: South Korea

The 1978 Asian Taekwondo Championships were the 3rd edition of the Asian Taekwondo Championships, and were held in Hong Kong from 8 to 10 September, 1978.

== Medal summary ==
Event	Gold	Silver	Bronze
Finweight (−48 kg)	Yun Jun-cheol; South Korea	Primus Wong; Malaysia	Mirahmad Zaafarinejad; Iran
Finweight (−48 kg)	Yun Jun-cheol; South Korea	Primus Wong; Malaysia	Sze Kwon Fai; Hong Kong
Flyweight (−53 kg)	Ha Suk-kwang; South Korea	Russell Dixon; Australia	Lee Yoke Wan; Malaysia
Flyweight (−53 kg)	Ha Suk-kwang; South Korea	Russell Dixon; Australia	Tam Kwong Lap; Hong Kong
Bantamweight (−58 kg)	Kim Yong-ki; South Korea	Robert Muir; Australia	Kim Il-hwan; Guam
Bantamweight (−58 kg)	Kim Yong-ki; South Korea	Robert Muir; Australia	Moi Chee Keong; Malaysia
Featherweight (−63 kg)	Kim Jung-gook; South Korea	Ninous Toman; Iran	So Kam Fan; Hong Kong
Featherweight (−63 kg)	Kim Jung-gook; South Korea	Ninous Toman; Iran	Bruce Talley; Guam
Lightweight (−68 kg)	Oh Il-nam; South Korea	Ki Wai Ming; Hong Kong	Hassan Zahedi; Iran
Lightweight (−68 kg)	Oh Il-nam; South Korea	Ki Wai Ming; Hong Kong	Michael Adey; Australia
Welterweight (−73 kg)	Yoo Yong-hap; South Korea	Geoff Rees; Australia	Won Kuk Kim; Hong Kong
Welterweight (−73 kg)	Yoo Yong-hap; South Korea	Geoff Rees; Australia	Abdolkarim Momeneh; Iran
Middleweight (−80 kg)	Chang Jong-tai; South Korea	Hamid Heshmatikhah; Iran	Ron Goddard; Australia
Middleweight (−80 kg)	Chang Jong-tai; South Korea	Hamid Heshmatikhah; Iran	Quah Siang Kooi; Malaysia
Heavyweight (+80 kg)	Ma Sang-hyun; South Korea	John Rhodes; Australia	Allan France; New Zealand
Heavyweight (+80 kg)	Ma Sang-hyun; South Korea	John Rhodes; Australia	Gholam Hassan Saeidi; Iran

== Medal table ==
Rank	Nation	Gold	Silver	Bronze	Total
1	South Korea	8	0	0	8
2	Australia	0	4	2	6
3	Iran	0	2	4	6
4	Hong Kong	0	1	4	5
5	Malaysia	0	1	3	4
6	Guam	0	0	2	2
7	New Zealand	0	0	1	1
Totals (7 entries)		8	8	16	32

== Participating nations ==
49 athletes from 11 nations competed.

- Australia (8)
- Brunei (1)
- Guam (4)
- Hong Kong (8)
- Iran (8)
- Malaysia (7)
- New Zealand (1)
- Pakistan (1)
- Singapore (1)
- South Korea (8)
- Thailand (2)
