= Cowin Mills =

Trinidadian Olympic sprinter (born 1986)

Personal information
- Nationality: Trinidad and Tobago
- Born: 31 January 1986 (age 40)
- Height: 1.83 m (6 ft 0 in)

Sport
- Sport: Athletics
- Event: 4 × 400 metres relay
- College team: Clemson Tigers (USA)

Achievements and titles
- Personal bests: 200 m: 20.84 s (2008); 400 m: 46.95 s (2008)

Cowin Mills (born January 31, 1986) is a Trinidadian sprinter, who specialized in the 400 metres. He is a 2007 NCAA All-American honoree, and a member of the track and field team for the Clemson Tigers. He is also a graduate of management at Clemson University in Clemson, South Carolina.

Mills competed for the men's 4 × 400 m relay at the 2008 Summer Olympics in Beijing, along with his teammates Ato Modibo, Jovon Toppin, and Stann Waithe. He ran on the third leg of the second heat, with an individual-split time of 46.60 seconds. Mills and his team finished the relay in fifth place for a seasonal best time of 3:04.12, failing to advance into the final.
