= Jovon Toppin =

Trinidadian sprinter (born 1989)

Personal information
- Nationality: Trinidad and Tobago
- Born: 2 January 1989 (age 37) Port of Spain, Trinidad and Tobago

Sport
- Sport: Athletics
- Event: 4 × 400 metres relay

Achievements and titles
- Personal bests: 200 m: 20.85 s (2009); 400 m: 46.94 s (2007)

Jovon Toppin (born January 2, 1989, in Port of Spain) is a Trinidadian sprinter, who specialized in the 400 metres.

Toppin competed for the Florida Gators track and field team in the NCAA.

Toppin competed for the men's 4 × 400 m relay at the 2008 Summer Olympics in Beijing, along with his teammates Ato Modibo, Cowin Mills, and Stann Waithe. He ran on the second leg of the second heat, with an individual-split time of 45.92 seconds. Toppin and his team finished the relay in fifth place, for a seasonal best time of 3:04.12, failing to advance into the final.
