= Ayşenur Taşbakan =

Turkish taekwondo practitioner

Personal information
- Nationality: Turkish
- Born: August 3, 1982 (age 43) Kırklareli, Turkey

Sport
- Country: Turkey
- Sport: Taekwondo
Medal record
Women's Taekwondo
Representing Turkey
World Cup
Bronze medal – third place	2000 Lyon	Lightweight
Bronze medal – third place	2001 Ho Chi Minh City	Lightweight
European Championships
Gold medal – first place	2000 Patras	Lightweight
Gold medal – first place	2002 Samsun	Lightweight

Ayşenur Taşbakan (born August 3, 1982) is a former European champion Turkish Taekwondo practitioner. Currently, she serves as a coach, and teaches physical education in a primary school.

She was born on August 5, 1982, in Kırklareli, Turkey. Taşbakan began practising taekwondo already in 1992. After winning the Turkish championship in her age category in 1995, she was admitted to the national team in 1996.

Taşbakan studied physical education and sports. After graduating, she began to work as a primary school teacher in Keçiören, Ankara. At the same time, she coaches Turkey national team and the Ankara Metropolitan Municipality's EGO Sports Club.

A multi-purpose sport hall in her hometown Kırklareli is named in her honor.

== Achievements ==
- (gold) 1998 World Championships - Istanbul, Turkey -59 kg youth
- (bronze) 2000 World Cup - Lyon, France -63 kg
- (gold) 2000 European Championships - Patras, Greece -63 kg
- (bronze) 2001 World Cup - Ho Chi Minh City, Vietnam -63 kg
- (gold) 2002 European Championships - Samsun, Turkey -63 kg
