= Jasmin Strachan =

Filipino taekwondo practitioner

Personal information
- Nationality: Filipino
- Born: 20 August 1978 (age 48) Tondo, Manila, Philippines
- Height: 5 ft 5 in (165 cm)

Sport
- Sport: Taekwondo
- University team: UST Growling Tigresses
Medal record
Representing the Philippines
Women's taekwondo
Asian Championships
Bronze medal – third place	1998 Ho Chi Minh City	Welterweight
Bronze medal – third place	2000 Hong Kong	Featherweight
Southeast Asian Games
Bronze medal – third place	2001 Kuala Lumpur	Bantamweight

Jasmin Strachan–Simpao (born 20 August 1978) is a Filipino taekwondo practitioner, born in Tondo, Manila. She competed at the 2000 Summer Olympics in Sydney. She won a bronze medal in welterweight at the 1998 Asian Taekwondo Championships, and a bronze medal in featherweight at the 2000 Asian Taekwondo Championships.

== Early life ==
In 1995, Strachan took her first taekwondo lesson. After a semester, she got a college scholarship and became a part of UST's taekwondo team. Two years later, she earned her black belt in taekwondo.

== Career ==
In 1998, Strachan became a part of the Philippine national team. That year, she won a bronze medal in welterweight at the 1998 Asian Taekwondo Championships. She was then able to qualify for the 2000 Summer Olympics by winning silver at the Asian & Oceania Qualification Tournament held in Manila. She, Roberto Cruz, Donald Geisler, and Eva Marie Ditan were the first four Filipino taekwondo jins to compete in the Olympics as taekwondo had just become an official sport.

Before competing in the 2000 Olympics, Strachan won a bronze medal in featherweight at the 2000 Asian Taekwondo Championships. At the Olympics, she got a bye in the first round. However, she then lost to Hieu Ngan Tran of Vietnam in the quarterfinals.

The following year, Strachan took home the bronze medal in the bantamweight at the 2001 SEA Games.

== Personal life ==
Strachan's younger sister Josephine also represented UST in taekwondo competitions.

Strachan is married to Dindo Simpao. Together, they coach the Philippine national taekwondo team, and are also head coaches for the UST taekwondo teams for both the men's and women's teams.
