= Wang Su (taekwondo) =

Chinese taekwondo practitioner

Personal information
- Nationality: Chinese
- Born: 15 March 1984 (age 42)

Sport
- Sport: Taekwondo
Medal record
Representing China
Women's taekwondo
World Championships
| Gold medal – first place | 1999 Edmonton | Bantamweight |
Asian Championships
| Silver medal – second place | 2000 Hongkong | -59 kg |

Wang Su (born 15 March 1984) is a Chinese taekwondo practitioner.

She won a gold medal in bantamweight at the 1999 World Taekwondo Championships in Edmonton, by defeating Jung Jae-eun in the final. She won a silver medal at the 2000 Asian Taekwondo Championships.
