= 1974 Asian Taekwondo Championships =

Taekwondo competition

- Venue: Kukkiwon
- Location: Seoul, South Korea
- Dates: 18–20 October 1974

Champions
- Men: South Korea

The 1974 Asian Taekwondo Championships were the 1st edition of the Asian Taekwondo Championships, and were held in Seoul, South Korea from 18 to 20 October, 1974.

== Medal summary ==
Event	Gold	Silver	Bronze
Finweight (−48 kg)	Yoon Chang-ok; South Korea	Khim Samon; Khmer Republic	Liu Ching-wen; Taiwan
Finweight (−48 kg)	Yoon Chang-ok; South Korea	Khim Samon; Khmer Republic	Jaime Martin; Philippines
Flyweight (−53 kg)	Ha Suk-kwang; South Korea	Au Yuet Sing; Hong Kong	Yoshiaki Baba; Japan
Flyweight (−53 kg)	Ha Suk-kwang; South Korea	Au Yuet Sing; Hong Kong	Lin Ruey-shan; Taiwan
Bantamweight (−58 kg)	Choo Sang-heun; South Korea	Chung Teng-mao; Taiwan	Tang Cham Rong; Hong Kong
Bantamweight (−58 kg)	Choo Sang-heun; South Korea	Chung Teng-mao; Taiwan	Sunny Chew; Singapore
Featherweight (−63 kg)	Park Won; South Korea	Kuo Ming-yuh; Taiwan	Chan Yue Yuen; Hong Kong
Featherweight (−63 kg)	Park Won; South Korea	Kuo Ming-yuh; Taiwan	John Chew; Singapore
Lightweight (−68 kg)	Lee Ki-hyung; South Korea	Roger Tham; Singapore	Michael Breglec; Australia
Lightweight (−68 kg)	Lee Ki-hyung; South Korea	Roger Tham; Singapore	Wang Tieh-cheng; Taiwan
Welterweight (−73 kg)	Kim Chul-hwan; South Korea	Khauv Sieng Veng; Khmer Republic	Alan Whiteway; Australia
Welterweight (−73 kg)	Kim Chul-hwan; South Korea	Khauv Sieng Veng; Khmer Republic	Daisaku Honda; Japan
Middleweight (−80 kg)	Yang Young-kwon; South Korea	Chang Hsiang-hsing; Taiwan	Josep Breglec; Australia
Middleweight (−80 kg)	Yang Young-kwon; South Korea	Chang Hsiang-hsing; Taiwan	Sam Sarun; Khmer Republic
Heavyweight (+80 kg)	Choi Jeong-do; South Korea	Lin Ying-peng; Taiwan	Victor Breglec; Australia
Heavyweight (+80 kg)	Choi Jeong-do; South Korea	Lin Ying-peng; Taiwan	Louis Thien; Malaysia

== Medal table ==
Rank	Nation	Gold	Silver	Bronze	Total
1	South Korea	8	0	0	8
2	Taiwan	0	4	3	7
3	Khmer Republic	0	2	1	3
4	Hong Kong	0	1	2	3
4	Singapore	0	1	2	3
6	Australia	0	0	4	4
7	Japan	0	0	2	2
8	Malaysia	0	0	1	1
8	Philippines	0	0	1	1
Totals (9 entries)		8	8	16	32
