= Bak Il =

South Korean actor and voice actor (1946–2019)

Bak Il (Korean: 박일; born September 2, 1946 – July 31, 2019) was a South Korean actor and voice actor who joined the Munhwa Broadcasting Corporation's Voice Acting Division in 1970.

== Personal life ==
He made his debut as a theater actor in 1966, and a year later, he officially debuted as a voice actor for TBC. From this time, the name Park Il was taken from the name of Kim Il, the leader of Korean professional wrestling at the time. After that, he re-debuted as the 4th voice actor of MBC in 1970 and maintained his status as a voice actor of the Culture Broadcasting Voice Actor until his death in 2019. He married Kim Yoon-kyung in 1978 but divorced in 1983. As a voice actor, he appeared in the foreign currency series Garyson Gurriller as a representative worker.

== Roles ==
=== Broadcast TV ===
- CSI: Crime Scene Investigation (replacing William Petersen, Korea TV Edition, MBC)
- 24 (replacing Dennis Haysbert, Korea TV Edition, MBC)
- Smallville (replacing John Schneider, Korea TV Edition, MBC)
- NYPD Blue (replacing David Caruso, Korea TV Edition, MBC)
- Time Tracks (replacing Jack Scalia, Korea TV Edition, SBS)

== Movie dubbing ==
=== Live action ===
- Pierce Brosnan
  - The Lawnmower Man (Dr. Lawrence Angelo, Korea TV Edition, MBC)
  - Mrs. Doubtfire (Stuart Dunmeyer, Korea TV Edition, SBS)
  - GoldenEye (James Bond, Korea TV Edition, MBC)
  - The Mirror Has Two Faces (Alex, Korea TV Edition, MBC)
  - Tomorrow Never Dies (James Bond, Korea TV Edition, MBC)
  - The World Is Not Enough (James Bond, Korea TV Edition, MBC)
  - The Tailor of Panama (Andy Osnard, Korea TV Edition, SBS)
  - After the Sunset (Max Burdett, Korea TV Edition, MBC)
- Michael Douglas
  - Fatal Attraction (Dan Gallagher, Korea TV Edition, MBC)
  - Black Rain (Nick Conklin, Korea TV Edition, SBS)
  - Shining Through (Ed Leland, Korea TV Edition, SBS)
  - Disclosure (Tom Sanders, Korea TV Edition, SBS)
  - The Ghost and the Darkness (Charles Remington, Korea TV Edition, MBC)
  - A Perfect Murder (Steven Taylor, Korea TV Edition, SBS)
  - The In-Laws (Steve Tobias, Korea TV Edition, SBS)
- George Clooney
  - One Fine Day (Jack Taylor, Korea TV Edition, MBC)
  - The Peacemaker (Lieutenant Colonel Thomas Devoe, Korea TV Edition, MBC)
  - Good Night, and Good Luck (Fred W. Friendly, Korea TV Edition, MBC)
- Double Jeopardy (replacing Bruce Greenwood, Korea TV Edition, MBC)
- Hamlet (Korea TV Edition, MBC)
- Heat (replacing Al Pacino, Korea TV Edition, MBC)
- In the Line of Fire (replacing Clint Eastwood, Korea TV Edition, MBC)
- Independence Day (replacing Bill Pullman, Korea TV Edition, MBC)
- Master and Commander: The Far Side of the World (replacing Russell Crowe, Korea TV Edition, MBC)
- Nick of Time (replacing Christopher Walken, Korea TV Edition, MBC)
- Out of Africa (replacing Robert Redford, Korea TV Edition, MBC)
- The Day After Tomorrow (replacing Dennis Quaid, Korea TV Edition, MBC)
- The Godfather (replacing Marlon Brando, Korea TV Edition, MBC)
- The Mission (replacing Robert De Niro, Korea TV Edition, MBC)
- The Shawshank Redemption (replacing Tim Robbins, Korea TV Edition, MBC)
- The Shipping News (replacing Kevin Spacey, Korea TV Edition, SBS)
- Up Close & Personal (replacing Robert Redford, Korea TV Edition, MBC)
- Vertical Limit (replacing Bill Paxton, Korea TV Edition, MBC)

=== Animated films ===
- The Incredibles (Mr. Incredible, Korea Movie Edition, Walt Disney)
- Toy Story (Buzz Lightyear, Korea Movie Edition, Walt Disney)
  - Toy Story 2 (Buzz Lightyear, Korea Movie Edition, Walt Disney)
  - Toy Story 3 (Buzz Lightyear, Korea Movie Edition, Walt Disney)
- Big Hero 6 (Stan Lee, Korea Movie Edition, Walt Disney)

=== Animated series ===
- The Loud House (Monster Trucks, Korea Movie Edition, Korea TV Edition, SBS)

== Death ==
Bak Il died in his sleep on July 31, 2019, aged 72. For a while, he was known to be born in 1949, but a broadcast revealed that he was actually born in 1946. Hwang Yoon-geol, the president of the cultural broadcasting voice actors, said that he had talked to Bak four days before his death. He was usually healthy, so he did not have a disease, and his voice was normal. However, he maintained his health by exercising steadily. Ten days before his death, he had an interview related to the role of Toy Story 4, and this was the last interview he had in his life. 3 sons and a daughter are currently living in the United States. Bak's niece is Park Jo-ho, the 12th voice actor of Culture Broadcasting, who was dismissed for causing a junior assault incident in 2005.

== See also ==
- Munhwa Broadcasting Corporation
- MBC Voice Acting Division
