= Stann Waithe =

Trinidadian sprinter (born 1985)

Personal information
- Nationality: Trinidad and Tobago
- Born: 3 November 1985 (age 40)

Sport
- Sport: Athletics
- Event: 4 × 400 metres relay
- College team: Michigan Wolverines (USA)

Achievements and titles
- Personal bests: 200 m: 21.33 s (2005); 400 m: 46.15 s (2006)

Stann Waithe (born November 3, 1985) is a Trinidadian sprinter, who specialized in the 400 metres. He is a member of the track and field team for the Michigan Wolverines, while attending the University of Michigan in Ann Arbor, Michigan.

Waithe competed for the men's 4 × 400 m relay at the 2008 Summer Olympics in Beijing, along with his teammates Ato Modibo, Jovon Toppin, and Cowin Mills. He ran on the anchor leg of the second heat, with an individual-split time of 46.43 seconds. Waithe and his team finished the relay in fifth place for a seasonal best time of 3:04.12, failing to advance into the final.

== See also ==
- Michigan Wolverines men's track and field
