= 2000 Asian Taekwondo Championships =

Taekwondo competition

- Venue: Queen Elizabeth Stadium
- Location: Hong Kong
- Dates: 13–16 May 2000

Champions
- Men: South Korea
- Women: South Korea

The 2000 Asian Taekwondo Championships are the 14th edition of the Asian Taekwondo Championships, and were held in Hong Kong from May 13 to May 16, 2000.

South Korea dominated the competition, winning 13 gold medals.

== Medal summary ==
=== Men ===
Event	Gold	Silver	Bronze
Finweight −54 kg	Min Byeong-seok; South Korea	Tshomlee Go; Philippines	Ali Rameshgar; Iran
Finweight −54 kg	Min Byeong-seok; South Korea	Tshomlee Go; Philippines	Takeshi Sannomiya; Japan
Flyweight −58 kg	Kim Dae-ryung; South Korea	Huang Ching-feng; Chinese Taipei	Satriyo Rahadhani; Indonesia
Flyweight −58 kg	Kim Dae-ryung; South Korea	Huang Ching-feng; Chinese Taipei	Kiyoteru Higuchi; Japan
Bantamweight −62 kg	Kang Nam-won; South Korea	Yoshimasa Aihara; Japan	Rodolfo Abratique; Philippines
Bantamweight −62 kg	Kang Nam-won; South Korea	Yoshimasa Aihara; Japan	Thamer Al-Mershad; Kuwait
Featherweight −67 kg	Lee Won-jae; South Korea	Vahid Abdollahi; Iran	Abdulmanam Al-Khawahr; Saudi Arabia
Featherweight −67 kg	Lee Won-jae; South Korea	Vahid Abdollahi; Iran	Jefferthom Go; Philippines
Lightweight −72 kg	Yoo Yong-jin; South Korea	Hsu Feng-chih; Chinese Taipei	Fariborz Askari; Iran
Lightweight −72 kg	Yoo Yong-jin; South Korea	Hsu Feng-chih; Chinese Taipei	Alvin Taraya; Philippines
Welterweight −78 kg	Oh Seon-taek; South Korea	Donald Geisler; Philippines	Kao Ming-chien; Chinese Taipei
Welterweight −78 kg	Oh Seon-taek; South Korea	Donald Geisler; Philippines	Leung Chun Lun; Hong Kong
Middleweight −84 kg	Park Cheon-deok; South Korea	Alessandro Lubiano; Philippines	Zhu Feng; China
Middleweight −84 kg	Park Cheon-deok; South Korea	Alessandro Lubiano; Philippines	Adilkhan Sagindykov; Kazakhstan
Heavyweight +84 kg	Moon Dae-sung; South Korea	Nguyễn Văn Hùng; Vietnam	Abdulqader Al-Adhami; Qatar
Heavyweight +84 kg	Moon Dae-sung; South Korea	Nguyễn Văn Hùng; Vietnam	Kwa Boon Aik; Brunei

=== Women ===
Event	Gold	Silver	Bronze
Finweight −47 kg	Joo Hye-won; South Korea	Yeh Chiao-ling; Chinese Taipei	Nguyễn Thị Huyền Diệu; Vietnam
Finweight −47 kg	Joo Hye-won; South Korea	Yeh Chiao-ling; Chinese Taipei	Rahadewi Neta; Indonesia
Flyweight −51 kg	Wu Yen-ni; Chinese Taipei	Shim Hye-young; South Korea	Elaine Teo; Malaysia
Flyweight −51 kg	Wu Yen-ni; Chinese Taipei	Shim Hye-young; South Korea	Sangina Baidya; Nepal
Bantamweight −55 kg	Jung Mi-na; South Korea	Kalindi Tamayo; Philippines	Renuka Magar; Nepal
Bantamweight −55 kg	Jung Mi-na; South Korea	Kalindi Tamayo; Philippines	Minako Hatakeyama; Japan
Featherweight −59 kg	Jang Ji-won; South Korea	Wang Su; China	Soo Lai Yin; Malaysia
Featherweight −59 kg	Jang Ji-won; South Korea	Wang Su; China	Jasmin Strachan; Philippines
Lightweight −63 kg	Cho Hyang-mi; South Korea	Zhang Huijing; China	Rosslyn Faulkner; Australia
Lightweight −63 kg	Cho Hyang-mi; South Korea	Zhang Huijing; China	Chang Shu-yuan; Chinese Taipei
Welterweight −67 kg	He Lumin; China	Camela Albino; Philippines	Chang Yi-tzu; Chinese Taipei
Welterweight −67 kg	He Lumin; China	Camela Albino; Philippines	Jung Jin-young; South Korea
Middleweight −72 kg	Kim Yoon-kyung; South Korea	Tsai Pei-shan; Chinese Taipei	Alaa Kutkut; Jordan
Middleweight −72 kg	Kim Yoon-kyung; South Korea	Tsai Pei-shan; Chinese Taipei	Margarita Bonifacio; Philippines
Heavyweight +72 kg	Chen Zhong; China	Sin Kyung-hyen; South Korea	Fong Yee Min; Singapore
Heavyweight +72 kg	Chen Zhong; China	Sin Kyung-hyen; South Korea	Sally Solis; Philippines

== Medal table ==
Rank	Nation	Gold	Silver	Bronze	Total
1	South Korea	13	2	1	16
2	China	2	2	1	5
3	Chinese Taipei	1	4	3	8
4	Philippines	0	5	6	11
5	Japan	0	1	3	4
6	Iran	0	1	2	3
7	Vietnam	0	1	1	2
8	Indonesia	0	0	2	2
8	Malaysia	0	0	2	2
8	Nepal	0	0	2	2
11	Australia	0	0	1	1
11	Brunei	0	0	1	1
11	Hong Kong	0	0	1	1
11	Jordan	0	0	1	1
11	Kazakhstan	0	0	1	1
11	Kuwait	0	0	1	1
11	Qatar	0	0	1	1
11	Saudi Arabia	0	0	1	1
11	Singapore	0	0	1	1
Totals (19 entries)		16	16	32	64
