= 2001 World Taekwondo Championships =

Taekwondo competition

- Venue: Halla Gymnasium
- Location: Jeju, South Korea
- Dates: 1–7 November 2007

Champions
- Men: South Korea
- Women: South Korea

The 2001 World Taekwondo Championships (2001년 세계 태권도 선수권 대회) were the 15th edition of the World Taekwondo Championships, and were held in Jeju, South Korea from 1 to 7 November 2001.

== Medal table ==
* Host nation (South Korea)

Rank	Nation	Gold	Silver	Bronze	Total
1	South Korea*	8	1	2	11
2	Turkey	2	0	3	5
3	France	1	1	0	2
3	Iran	1	1	0	2
3	United States	1	1	0	2
6	Azerbaijan	1	0	0	1
6	Great Britain	1	0	0	1
6	Netherlands	1	0	0	1
9	Spain	0	3	6	9
10	Chinese Taipei	0	3	1	4
11	Mexico	0	1	2	3
12	China	0	1	1	2
12	Italy	0	1	1	2
14	Denmark	0	1	0	1
14	Egypt	0	1	0	1
14	Uzbekistan	0	1	0	1
17	Greece	0	0	3	3
18	Belarus	0	0	2	2
18	Russia	0	0	2	2
20	Brazil	0	0	1	1
20	Croatia	0	0	1	1
20	Dominican Republic	0	0	1	1
20	Japan	0	0	1	1
20	Morocco	0	0	1	1
20	Norway	0	0	1	1
20	Philippines	0	0	1	1
20	Poland	0	0	1	1
20	Venezuela	0	0	1	1
Totals (28 entries)		16	16	32	64

== Medal summary ==
=== Men ===
Event	Gold	Silver	Bronze
Finweight (−54 kg)	Choi Yeon-ho; South Korea	Chu Mu-yen; Chinese Taipei	Juan Antonio Ramos; Spain
Finweight (−54 kg)	Choi Yeon-ho; South Korea	Chu Mu-yen; Chinese Taipei	Roberto Cruz; Philippines
Flyweight (−58 kg)	Behzad Khodadad; Iran	Eduard Khegai; Uzbekistan	Seyfula Magomedov; Russia
Flyweight (−58 kg)	Behzad Khodadad; Iran	Eduard Khegai; Uzbekistan	Kim Dae-ryung; South Korea
Bantamweight (−62 kg)	Kang Nam-won; South Korea	Peter López; United States	Kiyoteru Higuchi; Japan
Bantamweight (−62 kg)	Kang Nam-won; South Korea	Peter López; United States	Miguel Toledo; Spain
Featherweight (−67 kg)	Niyamaddin Pashayev; Azerbaijan	Carlo Molfetta; Italy	Abdullah Sertçelik; Turkey
Featherweight (−67 kg)	Niyamaddin Pashayev; Azerbaijan	Carlo Molfetta; Italy	Luis Benítez; Dominican Republic
Lightweight (−72 kg)	Steven López; United States	Jesper Roesen; Denmark	José Luis Ramírez; Mexico
Lightweight (−72 kg)	Steven López; United States	Jesper Roesen; Denmark	Athanasios Balilis; Greece
Welterweight (−78 kg)	Mamedy Doucara; France	Mahmoud Napelion; Egypt	Bekir Aydın; Turkey
Welterweight (−78 kg)	Mamedy Doucara; France	Mahmoud Napelion; Egypt	Marcin Chorzelewski; Poland
Middleweight (−84 kg)	Bahri Tanrıkulu; Turkey	Mickaël Borot; France	Jon García; Spain
Middleweight (−84 kg)	Bahri Tanrıkulu; Turkey	Mickaël Borot; France	Kim Kyong-hun; South Korea
Heavyweight (+84 kg)	Ferry Greevink; Netherlands	Hadi Afshar; Iran	Mici Kuzmanović; Croatia
Heavyweight (+84 kg)	Ferry Greevink; Netherlands	Hadi Afshar; Iran	Rubén Montesinos; Spain

=== Women ===
Event	Gold	Silver	Bronze
Finweight (−47 kg)	Kadriye Selimoğlu; Turkey	Kim Soo-yang; South Korea	Dalia Contreras; Venezuela
Finweight (−47 kg)	Kadriye Selimoğlu; Turkey	Kim Soo-yang; South Korea	Kong Fantao; China
Flyweight (−51 kg)	Lee Hye-young; South Korea	Brigitte Yagüe; Spain	Magda Seirekidou; Greece
Flyweight (−51 kg)	Lee Hye-young; South Korea	Brigitte Yagüe; Spain	Huang Chia-chin; Chinese Taipei
Bantamweight (−55 kg)	Jung Jae-eun; South Korea	Gemma Magría; Spain	Paola Félix; Mexico
Bantamweight (−55 kg)	Jung Jae-eun; South Korea	Gemma Magría; Spain	Pamela Agostinelli; Italy
Featherweight (−59 kg)	Jang Ji-won; South Korea	Iridia Salazar; Mexico	Zeynep Murat; Turkey
Featherweight (−59 kg)	Jang Ji-won; South Korea	Iridia Salazar; Mexico	Sonia Reyes; Spain
Lightweight (−63 kg)	Kim Yeon-ji; South Korea	Belén Fernández; Spain	Natália Falavigna; Brazil
Lightweight (−63 kg)	Kim Yeon-ji; South Korea	Belén Fernández; Spain	Mouna Benabderrassoul; Morocco
Welterweight (−67 kg)	Kim Hye-mi; South Korea	Chang Wan-chen; Chinese Taipei	Nina Solheim; Norway
Welterweight (−67 kg)	Kim Hye-mi; South Korea	Chang Wan-chen; Chinese Taipei	Luisa Arnanz; Spain
Middleweight (−72 kg)	Sarah Stevenson; Great Britain	Chen Zhong; China	Alesiya Charnyovskaya; Belarus
Middleweight (−72 kg)	Sarah Stevenson; Great Britain	Chen Zhong; China	Elisavet Mystakidou; Greece
Heavyweight (+72 kg)	Sin Kyung-hyen; South Korea	Wang I-hsien; Chinese Taipei	Maria Konyakhina; Russia
Heavyweight (+72 kg)	Sin Kyung-hyen; South Korea	Wang I-hsien; Chinese Taipei	Mariya Zhuravskaya; Belarus

== Team ranking ==
=== Men ===
Rank	Team
1	South Korea
2	Turkey
3	Iran
4	France
5	Spain

=== Women ===
Rank	Team
1	South Korea
2	Spain
3	Chinese Taipei
4	Turkey
5	Mexico
