= Carmen Silva (taekwondo) =

Brazilian taekwondo practitioner

Personal information
- Born: 12 October 1979 (age 45); Londrina, Brazil

Sport
- Sport: Taekwondo

Carmen Silva (born 12 October 1979) is a Brazilian taekwondo practitioner from Londrina.

She competed at the 2000 Summer Olympics in Sydney.
