= 1984 Asian Taekwondo Championships =

- Venue: Rizal Memorial Sports Complex
- Location: Manila, Philippines
- Dates: 9–11 November 1984

Champions
- Men: South Korea

The 1984 Asian Taekwondo Championships were the 6th edition of the Asian Taekwondo Championships, and were held in Manila, Philippines from 9 to 11 November 1984.

== Medal summary ==
Event	Gold	Silver	Bronze
Finweight (−48 kg)	Arnold Baradi; Philippines	Chang Jung-san; Chinese Taipei	Khalid Abdulla; Bahrain
Finweight (−48 kg)	Arnold Baradi; Philippines	Chang Jung-san; Chinese Taipei	S. Visvalingam; Singapore
Flyweight (−52 kg)	Kim Jun-tae; South Korea	Hatim Mukhtar; Saudi Arabia	Mike Ventosa; Philippines
Flyweight (−52 kg)	Kim Jun-tae; South Korea	Hatim Mukhtar; Saudi Arabia	Raad Bin Turaif; Jordan
Bantamweight (−56 kg)	Kwon Ki-moon; South Korea	Tareq Lababidi; Jordan	Amelito Agregado; Philippines
Bantamweight (−56 kg)	Kwon Ki-moon; South Korea	Tareq Lababidi; Jordan	Naser Al-Azemi; Kuwait
Featherweight (−60 kg)	Yang Myong-san; South Korea	Lee Wei-kang; Chinese Taipei	Marzooq Mohamed; Bahrain
Featherweight (−60 kg)	Yang Myong-san; South Korea	Lee Wei-kang; Chinese Taipei	Alf Dell'orso; Australia
Lightweight (−64 kg)	Han Jae-koo; South Korea	Lin Tsung-yung; Chinese Taipei	Khalil Aqil; Jordan
Lightweight (−64 kg)	Han Jae-koo; South Korea	Lin Tsung-yung; Chinese Taipei	Tana Sinprasat; Thailand
Welterweight (−68 kg)	Lee Joon-myung; South Korea	Rashed Mubarak; Bahrain	Wu Tsung-hui; Chinese Taipei
Welterweight (−68 kg)	Lee Joon-myung; South Korea	Rashed Mubarak; Bahrain	Charles Rawlins; Australia
Light middleweight (−73 kg)	Jeong Kook-hyun; South Korea	Jo Jin-ho; Australia	Ghanim Khalaf; Kuwait
Light middleweight (−73 kg)	Jeong Kook-hyun; South Korea	Jo Jin-ho; Australia	Hussain Al-Qahtani; Qatar
Middleweight (−78 kg)	Park Sam-sik; South Korea	Montri Kaewthumrong; Thailand	Abdulla Habib; Bahrain
Middleweight (−78 kg)	Park Sam-sik; South Korea	Montri Kaewthumrong; Thailand	Lee Yoke Keong; Malaysia
Light heavyweight (−84 kg)	Kim Jong-suk; South Korea	Chao Wen-kan; Chinese Taipei	Albert Puzon; Philippines
Light heavyweight (−84 kg)	Kim Jong-suk; South Korea	Chao Wen-kan; Chinese Taipei	Mutlaq Al-Otaibi; Kuwait
Heavyweight (+84 kg)	Ko Yong-chul; South Korea	Aied Khidr Al-Shammari; Qatar	Danny Yap; Philippines
Heavyweight (+84 kg)	Ko Yong-chul; South Korea	Aied Khidr Al-Shammari; Qatar	Victor Bateman; Australia

== Medal table ==
Rank	Nation	Gold	Silver	Bronze	Total
1	South Korea	9	0	0	9
2	Philippines	1	0	4	5
3	Chinese Taipei	0	4	1	5
4	Australia	0	1	3	4
4	Bahrain	0	1	3	4
6	Jordan	0	1	2	3
7	Qatar	0	1	1	2
7	Thailand	0	1	1	2
9	Saudi Arabia	0	1	0	1
10	Kuwait	0	0	3	3
11	Malaysia	0	0	1	1
11	Singapore	0	0	1	1
Totals (12 entries)		10	10	20	40
