= Rasheya Jasmin Luis =

Filipino sports shooter

Personal information
- Born: September 4, 1973 (age 51)

Sport
- Country: Philippines
- Sport: Shooting
- Event: 10 m air rifle

Rasheya Jasmin Luis (born September 4, 1973 in Pasig) is a Filipino sport shooter. She tied for 44th place in the women's 10 metre air rifle event at the 2000 Summer Olympics.

Hailing on Mandaluyong, Luis is a graduate of the Ateneo de Manila University.
