= Donald Geisler =

Filipino taekwondo athlete

Personal information
- Nationality: Filipino
- Born: Donald David von Geisler III; October 6, 1977 (age 48) Angeles City, Philippines
- Height: 6 ft 1 in (1.85 m)

Sport
- Country: Philippines
- Sport: Taekwondo
Medal record
Men's taekwondo
Representing Philippines
Event	1st	2nd	3rd
Asian Games	0	1	0
Asian Championships	0	1	1
Southeast Asian Games	3	1	0
Total	3	3	1
Asian Games
Silver medal – second place	1998 Bangkok	Featherweight
Asian Championships
Silver medal – second place	2000 Hong Kong	Welterweight
Bronze medal – third place	2002 Amman	Welterweight
Southeast Asian Games
Gold medal – first place	2005 Philippines	Lightweight
Gold medal – first place	2003 Vietnam	
Silver medal – second place	2001 Malaysia	Lightweight
Gold medal – first place	1999 Brunei	

Donald David "Donnie" von Geisler III (born October 6, 1977) is a retired Filipino taekwondo athlete of German-American descent, who represented the Philippines in the Summer Olympic Games in the years 2000 and 2004. He is a 1998 Asian Games and World Cup Taekwondo Silver medalist, and won a gold medal for the men's lightweight division at the 2005 Southeast Asian Games held in Pasay, Philippines before his retirement.

== Early years ==
Geisler started playing taekwondo at the age of seven. He was trained by a Korean trainer at school where he developed his skills for the sport.

== Post-retirement ==
Geisler later became a business owner and promoted the sport of taekwondo. However, in 2014, he began having a dispute with the Philippine Taekwondo Association which he accused of preventing coaches and players in guesting in his virtual classes. On September 21, 2020, Geisler declared a persona-non-grata by the PTA, which meant his expulsion from the association.

== Career highlights ==
- Gold Medal at the 23rd Southeast Asian Games. (2005)
- Gold Medal at the 22nd Southeast Asian Games. (2003)
- Bronze Medal at the 15th Asian Taekwondo Championships. (2002)
- Silver Medal at the 21st Southeast Asian Games. (2001)
- Silver Medal at the 14th Asian Taekwondo Championships. (2000)
- Gold Medal at the 20th Southeast Asian Games. (1999)
- Silver Medal at the Bangkok Asian Games. (1998)
- Silver Medal at the World Cup Taekwondo. (1998)
- Bronze Medal at the 1st World Taekwondo Junior Championships. (1996)
