= Taekwondo at the 2000 Summer Olympics =

Taekwondo at the Games of the XXVII Olympiad
- Competitors: 103 from 51 nations

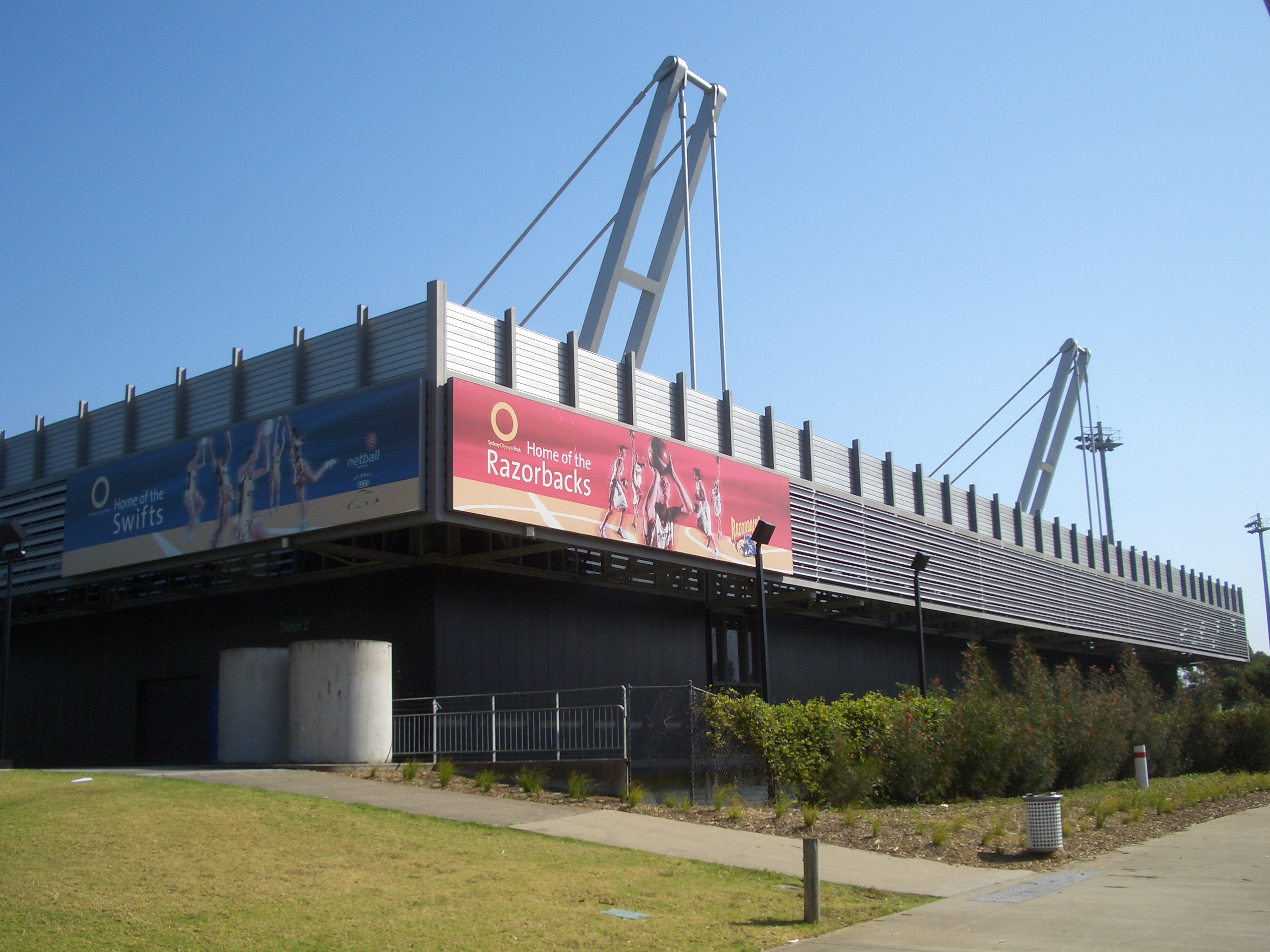
Taekwondo was held at the State Sports Centre in Sydney Olympic Park.

Taekwondo was contested as an official sport at the Olympic Games for the first time at the 2000 Summer Olympics in Sydney. It had previously been a demonstration sport in 1988 and 1992. Medals were awarded in four weight classes each for men and women. Tran Hieu Ngan became the first Vietnamese Olympic medalist in this competition.

== Medal summary ==
=== Men's events ===
Event	Gold	Silver	Bronze
Flyweight (58 kg)	Michail Mouroutsos; Greece	Gabriel Esparza; Spain	Huang Chih-hsiung; Chinese Taipei
Lightweight (68 kg)	Steven López; United States	Sin Joon-sik; South Korea	Hadi Saei; Iran
Middleweight (80 kg)	Ángel Matos; Cuba	Faissal Ebnoutalib; Germany	Víctor Estrada; Mexico
Heavyweight (+80 kg)	Kim Kyong-hun; South Korea	Daniel Trenton; Australia	Pascal Gentil; France

=== Women's events ===
Event	Gold	Silver	Bronze
Flyweight (49 kg)	Lauren Burns; Australia	Urbia Melendez; Cuba	Chi Shu-ju; Chinese Taipei
Lightweight (57 kg)	Jung Jae-eun; South Korea	Tran Hieu Ngan; Vietnam	Hamide Bıkçın Tosun; Turkey
Middleweight (67 kg)	Lee Sun-hee; South Korea	Trude Gundersen; Norway	Yoriko Okamoto; Japan
Heavyweight (+67 kg)	Chen Zhong; China	Natalia Ivanova; Russia	Dominique Bosshart; Canada

== Medal table ==
* Host nation (Australia)

Rank	Nation	Gold	Silver	Bronze	Total
1	South Korea	3	1	0	4
2	Australia*	1	1	0	2
2	Cuba	1	1	0	2
4	China	1	0	0	1
4	Greece	1	0	0	1
4	United States	1	0	0	1
7	Germany	0	1	0	1
7	Norway	0	1	0	1
7	Russia	0	1	0	1
7	Spain	0	1	0	1
7	Vietnam	0	1	0	1
12	Chinese Taipei	0	0	2	2
13	Canada	0	0	1	1
13	France	0	0	1	1
13	Iran	0	0	1	1
13	Japan	0	0	1	1
13	Mexico	0	0	1	1
13	Turkey	0	0	1	1
Totals (18 entries)		8	8	8	24

== Participating nations ==
A total of 103 taekwondo athletes from 51 nations competed at the Sydney Games:

- Argentina (2)
- Australia (8)
- Austria (1)
- Benin (1)
- Brazil (1)
- Canada (1)
- Chile (1)
- China (3)
- Chinese Taipei (4)
- Colombia (1)
- Ivory Coast (1)
- Croatia (1)
- Cuba (4)
- Denmark (2)
- Egypt (3)
- Finland (2)
- France (2)
- Germany (3)
- Great Britain (2)
- Greece (3)
- Guatemala (1)
- Hungary (1)
- Indonesia (1)
- Iran (2)
- Italy (3)
- Japan (2)
- Jordan (1)
- Kuwait (1)
- Lesotho (2)
- Libya (1)
- Malaysia (1)
- Mexico (3)
- Monaco (1)
- Morocco (3)
- Netherlands (2)
- Nicaragua (1)
- Norway (1)
- Philippines (4)
- Russia (2)
- Saudi Arabia (1)
- Slovenia (1)
- South Africa (1)
- South Korea (4)
- Spain (4)
- Swaziland (1)
- Sweden (2)
- Trinidad and Tobago (1)
- Turkey (2)
- United States (4)
- Venezuela (1)
- Vietnam (2)

== Controversies ==
- Bronze medalist Chi Shu-Ju, Hamide Bıkçın Tosun, Hadi Saei and Pascal Gentil complained to the media about what they perceived as biased refereeing which made them lose their possible gold medal. Pascal Gentil even refused to be photographed with his fellow medalists Kim Kyong-Hun and Daniel Trenton in the medal ceremony. Gold medalist Steven López revealed some inside story in his family's 2009 book.
