= Hamide Bıkçın =

Turkish taekwondo practitioner

Hamide Bıçkın
Personal information
- Full name: Hamide Bıçkın
- Nationality: Turkish
- Born: Hamide Bıçkın; January 24, 1978 (age 48)
- Height: 167 cm (5 ft 6 in)
- Weight: 57 kg (126 lb)

Sport
- Country: Turkey
- Sport: Taekwondo
- Event: Featherweight
- Club: İstanbul Büyükşehir Belediyesi S.K.
Medal record
Olympic Games
Bronze medal – third place	2000 Sydney	57 kg
World Championships
Gold medal – first place	1995 Manila	47 kg
Silver medal – second place	2007 Beijing	59 kg
European Championships
Gold medal – first place	2000 Patras	55 kg
Silver medal – second place	2004 Lillehammer	59 kg
Bronze medal – third place	2008 Rome	63 kg

Hamide Bıçkın (born January 24, 1978) formerly known as Hamide Bıçkın is a female Turkish Taekwondo athlete, who competed in the Women's 49–57 kg weight class at the 2000 Summer Olympics held in Sydney, Australia and won the bronze medal.

Bıkçın took up taekwondo already aged eight. After winning the European and World championships, she married and became mother of a daughter, Zeynep. Hamide Bıkçın Tosun suspended her active fighting sports life in the years 1996 and 1997. She started again 1998 to perform taekwondo and represented Turkey at the 2000 Olympics.

== Achievements ==
- 1995 World Taekwondo Championships in the Philippines – gold (Flyweight)
- 2000 13th European Seniors Taekwondo Championships in Patras, Greece – gold (Bantamweight)
- 2000 Summer Olympics in Sydney, Australia – bronze
- 2002 7th Universiade in Berkeley, California, U.S. – gold (58 kg)
- 2002 Taekwondo Belgian Open in Lommel, Belgium – gold (Bantamweight)
- 2004 15th European Seniors Taekwondo Championships in Lillehammer, Norway – silver (Featherweight)
