= Gemma Magría =

Spanish taekwondo practitioner (born 1981)

Personal information
- Nationality: Spanish
- Born: 14 April 1981 (age 45)

Sport
- Sport: Taekwondo
Medal record
Representing Spain
Women's taekwondo
World Championships
Silver medal – second place	2001 Jeju	Bantamweight

Gemma Magría (born 14 April 1981) is a Spanish taekwondo practitioner.

She won a bronze medal in at the 2000 European Taekwondo Championships. She won a silver medal in bantamweight at the 2001 World Taekwondo Championships in Jeju City, after being defeated by Jung Jae-eun in the final.
