= Virginia Lourens =

Dutch taekwondo practitioner (born 1975)

Personal information
- Nationality: Dutch
- Born: 23 February 1975 (age 50); Eindhoven, Netherlands

Sport
- Sport: Taekwondo

Virginia Lourens (born 23 February 1975) is a Dutch taekwondo practitioner, born in Eindhoven. She competed at the 2000 Summer Olympics in Sydney.
