= Trần Hiếu Ngân =

Vietnamese Taekwondo practitioner

Medal record

Women's taekwondo

Representing Vietnam

Olympic Games
Silver medal – second place	2000 Sydney	57 kg

Asian Games
Bronze medal – third place	1998 Bangkok	Bantamweight

Asian Championships
Gold medal – first place	1998 Ho Chi Minh	Featherweight
Silver medal – second place	1996 Melbourne	Featherweight

Trần Hiếu Ngân (born June 26, 1974 in Tuy Hòa, Phú Yên) is a Vietnamese Taekwondo athlete who competed in the Women's 49-57 kg weight class at the Sydney 2000 Summer Olympics, where she won the silver medal. She was the first Vietnamese athlete to win a medal at the Olympic Games.

On the afternoon of September 28, 2000, at the Sydney 2000 Summer Olympics, Trần Hiếu Ngân won the first Olympic Silver Medal for Vietnam. After winning Hiếu Ngân decided to retire from competition and became the treasurer of the Ho Chi Minh City Martial Arts Training Center while also serving as a coach for the youth team of Ho Chi Minh City. She married and had a daughter in 2002.

== Awards and honors ==
In 2000, she was awarded the Second-Class Labor Order by the president of Vietnam Trần Đức Lương.
