= Cheryl-Ann Sankar =

Trinidad and Tobago taekwondo practitioner

Personal information
- Nationality: Trinidad and Tobago
- Born: 26 February 1964 (age 62) Port of Spain, Trinidad and Tobago

Sport
- Sport: Taekwondo
Medal record
Representing Trinidad and Tobago
Women's taekwondo
Pan American Games
Bronze medal – third place	1995 Mar del Plata	-51 kg
Pan American Championships
Silver medal – second place	1996 Havanna	-55 kg

Cheryl-Ann Sankar (born 26 February 1964) is a Trinidad and Tobago taekwondo practitioner, born in Port of Spain. She competed at the 2000 Summer Olympics in Sydney. She participated in the 1993, 1995, 1997 and 1999 World Taekwondo Championships. She won a bronze medal at the 1995 Pan American Games, and a silver medal at the 1996 Pan American Taekwondo Championships.
