= Ato Stephens =

Personal information
- Born: 19 June 1979 (age 47)

Sport
- Sport: Track and field
Medal record
Representing Trinidad and Tobago
CAC Championships
Bronze medal – third place	2003 St. George's	400 m
Silver medal – second place	2005 Nassau	400 m

Ato Stephens (born Ato Modibo; 19 June 1979) is a sprinter from Trinidad and Tobago who specialises in the 400 metres. He won a bronze medal at the 2003 CAC Championships, and took the silver at the 2005 edition. He is married to Cydonie Mothersille, a sprinter for the Cayman Islands.

Competing for the Clemson Tigers track and field team, Stephens won the 1999 400 meters at the NCAA Division I Indoor Track and Field Championships in a time of 46.11.

He has competed at the Summer Olympics three times, but did not progress beyond the heats at the 2000, 2004 or 2008 editions. Stephens ran at the World Championships in Athletics in 2001, 2005 and 2007. He has also represented Trinidad and Tobago in the 4×400 metres relay. His best performances in major competitions include a third-place finish in the semifinals at the 2007 World Championships and fourth in the semifinals at the 2006 Commonwealth Games.

Stephens was coached by coach Henry Rolle.
