= Asian Taekwondo Championships =

Taekwondo competition

- Current event or competition: 2026 Asian Taekwondo Championships

Competition details
- Discipline: Taekwondo
- Type: kyourugui, biennial
- Organiser: Asian Taekwondo Union (ATU)

History
- First edition: 1973 in Seoul, South Korea

The Asian Taekwondo Championships are the Asian senior championships in Taekwondo, first held in South Korea in 1973. The event is held every two years and is organized by the Asian Taekwondo Union, the continental affiliate of World Taekwondo, which organises and controls Olympic style taekwondo.

== Competitions ==
#	Year	Date	City and host country	Venue
1	1974	18–20 October	Seoul, South Korea	Kukkiwon
2	1976	16–17 October	Melbourne, Australia	Dallas Brooks Hall
3	1978	8–10 September	Hong Kong	Macpherson Stadium
4	1980	14–16 November	Taipei, Taiwan	Municipal Gymnasium
5	1982	9–11 December	Singapore	Gay World Stadium
6	1984	9–11 November	Manila, Philippines	Rizal Memorial Sports Complex
7	1986	18–20 April	Darwin, Australia	Marrara Indoor Stadium
8	1988	23–25 March	Kathmandu, Nepal	Dasharath Rangasala
9	1990	2–4 June	Taipei, Taiwan	Municipal Junior College
10	1992	31 January – 2 February	Kuala Lumpur, Malaysia	Stadium Negara
11	1994	28–30 January	Manila, Philippines	Ninoy Aquino Stadium
12	1996	14–16 June	Melbourne, Australia	
13	1998	15–17 May	Ho Chi Minh City, Vietnam	
14	2000	13–16 May	Hong Kong	Queen Elizabeth Stadium
15	2002	26–28 April	Amman, Jordan	
16	2004	20–23 May	Seongnam, South Korea	Seongnam Gymnasium
17	2006	21–23 April	Bangkok, Thailand	Indoor Stadium Huamark
18	2008	26–28 April	Luoyang, China	The Sports Centre Gymnasium
19	2010	21–23 May	Astana, Kazakhstan	Daulet Sport Complex
20	2012	9–11 May	Ho Chi Minh City, Vietnam	Phú Thọ Indoor Stadium
21	2014	26–28 May	Tashkent, Uzbekistan	Universal Palace Uzbekistan
22	2016	18–20 April	Pasay, Philippines	Marriott Convention Center
23	2018	26–28 May	Ho Chi Minh City, Vietnam	Phú Thọ Indoor Stadium
24	2021	16–18 June	Beirut, Lebanon	Nouhad Naufal Stadium
25	2022	24–27 June	Chuncheon, South Korea	Hoban Gymnasium
26	2024	16–18 May	Da Nang, Vietnam	Tiên Sơn Sports Palace
27	2026	21–24 May	Ulaanbaatar, Mongolia	M Bank Arena

== All-time medal table ==
All-time medal count, as of the 2026 Asian Taekwondo Championships.

Rank	Nation	Gold	Silver	Bronze	Total
1	South Korea	223	49	55	327
2	Chinese Taipei	43	77	63	183
3	Iran	37	45	61	143
4	China	30	26	46	102
5	Uzbekistan	16	13	35	64
6	Thailand	9	25	26	60
7	Jordan	8	23	60	91
8	Vietnam	6	15	29	50
9	Australia	3	23	51	77
10	Philippines	3	22	65	90
11	Kazakhstan	3	8	39	50
12	Saudi Arabia	2	6	11	19
13	Indonesia	1	8	31	40
14	Malaysia	1	8	29	38
15	Nepal	1	3	12	16
16	Lebanon	1	1	9	11
17	Afghanistan	1	1	8	10
18	Macau	1	1	3	5
19	Singapore	0	6	24	30
20	Japan	0	6	23	29
21	Qatar	0	4	12	16
22	Hong Kong	0	3	15	18
23	Tajikistan	0	3	6	9
24	Cambodia	0	3	3	6
25	Bahrain	0	2	6	8
26	India	0	1	6	7
27	Guam	0	1	4	5
28	Syria	0	1	3	4
29	Iraq	0	1	2	3
29	Mongolia	0	1	2	3
29	Pakistan	0	1	2	3
29	Yemen	0	1	2	3
33	Myanmar	0	1	1	2
34	Kuwait	0	0	9	9
34	New Zealand	0	0	9	9
36	Palestine	0	0	4	4
37	Brunei	0	0	2	2
38	Laos	0	0	1	1
38	Tahiti	0	0	1	1
38	United Arab Emirates	0	0	1	1
Totals (40 entries)		389	389	771	1,549

== Team ranking ==
Year	Men			Women		
Year	1st	2nd	3rd	1st	2nd	3rd
1974	South Korea	Taiwan	Khmer Republic	Not held		
1976	South Korea	Australia	Philippines	Not held		
1978	South Korea	Australia	Iran	Not held		
1980	South Korea	Taiwan	Jordan	Not held		
1982	South Korea	Thailand	Chinese Taipei	Not held		
1984	South Korea	Chinese Taipei	Philippines	Not held		
1986	South Korea	Australia	Chinese Taipei	Chinese Taipei	South Korea	Australia
1988	South Korea	Chinese Taipei	Jordan	South Korea	Chinese Taipei	Australia
1990	South Korea	Chinese Taipei	Jordan	Chinese Taipei	South Korea	Malaysia
1992	South Korea	Iran	Chinese Taipei	South Korea	Chinese Taipei	Malaysia
1994	South Korea	Philippines	Chinese Taipei	South Korea	Chinese Taipei	Philippines
1996	South Korea	Iran	Japan	South Korea	Chinese Taipei	Australia
1998	South Korea	Chinese Taipei	Jordan	South Korea	Chinese Taipei	China
2000	South Korea	Philippines	Chinese Taipei	South Korea	China	Chinese Taipei
2002	South Korea	Iran	Jordan	South Korea	China	Chinese Taipei
2004	South Korea	Iran	Chinese Taipei	South Korea	Chinese Taipei	China
2006	South Korea	Iran	Thailand	South Korea	Thailand	Chinese Taipei
2008	Iran	China	South Korea	China	Chinese Taipei	South Korea
2010	Iran	South Korea	Thailand	South Korea	China	Chinese Taipei
2012	South Korea	Iran	Jordan	Chinese Taipei	China	South Korea
2014	Iran	South Korea	Uzbekistan	South Korea	China	Thailand
2016	Iran	South Korea	Uzbekistan	South Korea	Chinese Taipei	Thailand
2018	South Korea	Iran	Uzbekistan	China	South Korea	Vietnam
2021	South Korea	Uzbekistan	Iran	South Korea	Iran	Vietnam
2022	Uzbekistan	South Korea	Jordan	Iran	China	South Korea
2024	Iran	South Korea	Uzbekistan	South Korea	China	Thailand
2026	South Korea	Iran	Jordan	Chinese Taipei	South Korea	China
