= Germany at the 2000 Summer Olympics =

- IOC code: GER
- NOC: National Olympic Committee for Germany

in Sydney, Australia 15 September − 1 October
- Competitors: 422 (241 men, 181 women) in 29 sports
- Flag bearers: Birgit Fischer (opening); Heike Drechsler (closing)
- Medals Ranked 5th: Gold 13 Silver 17 Bronze 26 Total 56

Summer Olympics appearances (overview)
- 1896; 1900; 1904; 1908; 1912; 1920–1924; 1928; 1932; 1936; 1948; 1952; 1956–1988; 1992; 1996; 2000; 2004; 2008; 2012; 2016; 2020; 2024; 2028

Other related appearances
- 1906 Intercalated Games –––– Saar (1952); United Team of Germany (1956–1964); East Germany (1968–1988); West Germany (1968–1988)

Germany competed at the 2000 Summer Olympics in Sydney, Australia. 422 competitors, 241 men and 181 women, took part in 234 events in 29 sports.

== Medalists ==
Germany finished in fifth position in the final medal rankings, with 13 gold medals and 56 medals overall.

Medal	Name	Sport	Event	Date
Gold	Robert Bartko	Cycling	Men's individual pursuit	17 September
Gold	Robert Bartko; Daniel Becke; Guido Fulst; Jens Lehmann	Cycling	Men's team pursuit	19 September
Gold	Thomas Schmidt	Canoeing	Men's slalom K-1	20 September
Gold	Kathrin Boron; Jana Thieme	Rowing	Women's double sculls	23 September
Gold	Kerstin El Qalqili-Kowalski; Meike Evers; Manja Kowalski; Manuela Lutze	Rowing	Women's quadruple sculls	24 September
Gold	Nadine Capellmann; Ulla Salzgeber; Alexandra Simons; Isabell Werth	Equestrian	Team dressage	26 September
Gold	Jan Ullrich	Cycling	Men's individual road race	27 September
Gold	Nils Schumann	Athletics	Men's 800 metres	27 September
Gold	Otto Becker; Ludger Beerbaum; Marcus Ehning; Lars Nieberg	Equestrian	Team jumping	28 September
Gold	Heike Drechsler	Athletics	Women's long jump	29 September
Gold	Andreas Dittmer	Canoeing	Men's C-1 1000 metres	30 September
Gold	Birgit Fischer; Manuela Mucke; Anett Schuck; Katrin Wagner	Canoeing	Women's K-4 500 metres	30 September
Gold	Birgit Fischer; Katrin Wagner	Canoeing	Women's K-2 500 metres	1 October
Silver	Stefan Nimke	Cycling	Men's track time trial	16 September
Silver	Stephan Vuckovic	Triathlon	Men's	17 September
Silver	Jens Lehmann	Cycling	Men's individual pursuit	17 September
Silver	Ralf Bißdorf	Fencing	Men's foil	20 September
Silver	Rita König	Fencing	Women's foil	21 September
Silver	Marc Huster	Weightlifting	Men's 85 kg	23 September
Silver	Claudia Blasberg; Valerie Viehoff	Rowing	Women's lightweight double sculls	24 September
Silver	Amelie Lux	Sailing	Women's Mistral One Design	24 September
Silver	Lars Riedel	Athletics	Men's discus throw	25 September
Silver	Hanka Kupfernagel	Cycling	Women's individual road race	26 September
Silver	Ronny Weller	Weightlifting	Men's +105 kg	26 September
Silver	Tommy Haas	Tennis	Men's singles	28 September
Silver	Faissal Ebnoutalib	Taekwondo	Men's 80 kg	29 September
Silver	Björn Bach; Jan Schäfer; Stefan Ulm; Mark Zabel	Canoeing	Men's K-4 1000 metres	30 September
Silver	Isabell Werth	Equestrian	Individual dressage	30 September
Silver	Jan Ullrich	Cycling	Men's road time trial	30 September
Silver	Gunnar Bahr; Ingo Borkowski; Jochen Schümann	Sailing	Soling	30 September
Bronze	Anna-Maria Gradante	Judo	Women's 48 kg	16 September
Bronze	Stev Theloke	Swimming	Men's 100 metre backstroke	18 September
Bronze	Jens Fiedler	Cycling	Men's sprint	20 September
Bronze	Antje Buschschulte; Sara Harstick; Kerstin Kielgass; Franziska van Almsick; Meike Freitag (heats); Britta Steffen (heats)	Swimming	Women's 4 × 200 metre freestyle relay	20 September
Bronze	Cornelia Pfohl; Barbara Mensing; Sandra Sachse	Archery	Women's team	21 September
Bronze	Wiradech Kothny	Fencing	Men's sabre	21 September
Bronze	Jens Fiedler	Cycling	Men's keirin	21 September
Bronze	Katrin Rutschow-Stomporowski	Rowing	Women's single sculls	23 September
Bronze	Marcel Hacker	Rowing	Men's single sculls	23 September
Bronze	Jan Hempel; Heiko Meyer	Diving	Men's synchronized 10 metre platform	23 September
Bronze	Sabine Bau; Rita König; Monika Weber	Fencing	Women's team foil	23 September
Bronze	Jens Kruppa; Thomas Rupprath; Torsten Spanneberg; Stev Theloke	Swimming	Men's 4 × 100 metre medley relay	23 September
Bronze	Marco Geisler; Andreas Hajek; Stephan Volkert; André Willms	Rowing	Men's quadruple sculls	24 September
Bronze	Roland Gäbler; Rene Schwall	Sailing	Tornado	24 September
Bronze	Dennis Bauer; Wiradech Kothny; Alexander Weber	Fencing	Men's team sabre	24 September
Bronze	Jörg Ahmann; Axel Hager	Volleyball	Men's beach	26 September
Bronze	Andreas Klöden	Cycling	Men's individual road race	27 September
Bronze	Sebastian Köber	Boxing	Heavyweight	28 September
Bronze	Dörte Lindner	Diving	Women's 3 metre springboard	28 September
Bronze	Astrid Kumbernuss	Athletics	Women's shot put	28 September
Bronze	Germany women's national football team: Nadine Angerer; Nicole Brandebusemeyer; Doris Fitschen; Jeannette Götte; Stefanie Gottschlich; Inka Grings; Ariane Hingst; Melanie Hoffmann; Steffi Jones; Renate Lingor; Maren Meinert; Sandra Minnert; Claudia Müller; Birgit Prinz; Silke Rottenberg; Kerstin Stegemann; Bettina Wiegmann; Tina Wunderlich	Football	Women's tournament	28 September
Bronze	Kirsten Münchow	Athletics	Women's hammer throw	29 September
Bronze	Lars Kober; Stefan Uteß	Canoeing	Men's C-2 1000 metres	30 September
Bronze	Ulla Salzgeber	Equestrian	Individual dressage	30 September
Bronze	Andreas Dittmer	Canoeing	Men's C-1 500 metres	1 October
Bronze	Ronald Rauhe; Tim Wieskötter	Canoeing	Men's K-2 500 metres	1 October

== Competitors ==
The following is the list of number of competitors in the Games.

Sport	Men	Women	Total
Archery	1	3	4
Athletics	34	30	64
Badminton	3	3	6
Boxing	8	–	8
Canoeing	19	6	25
Cycling	17	8	25
Diving	4	4	8
Equestrian	6	8	14
Fencing	12	6	18
Field hockey	16	16	32
Football	0	17	17
Gymnastics	7	9	16
Handball	15	0	15
Judo	6	5	11
Modern pentathlon	1	1	2
Rowing	20	11	31
Sailing	13	4	17
Shooting	14	6	20
Swimming	16	18	34
Table tennis	3	5	8
Taekwondo	2	1	3
Tennis	4	1	5
Triathlon	2	2	4
Volleyball	4	16	20
Weightlifting	4	1	5
Wrestling	10	–	10
Total	241	181	422

== Archery ==
The German women's archery team won its second Olympic medal in 2000 by defeating Turkey in the bronze medal match.

Men

Athlete	Event	Ranking round		Round of 64	Round of 32	Round of 16	Quarterfinals	Semifinals	Final / BM	
Athlete	Event	Score	Seed	Opposition Score	Opposition Score	Opposition Score	Opposition Score	Opposition Score	Opposition Score	Rank
Christian Stubbe	Individual	596	54	Torres (FRA); W 163-161	Yang B (CHN); L 152-159	did not advance				

Women

Athlete	Event	Ranking round		Round of 64	Round of 32	Round of 16	Quarterfinals	Semifinals	Final / BM	
Athlete	Event	Score	Seed	Opposition Score	Opposition Score	Opposition Score	Opposition Score	Opposition Score	Opposition Score	Rank
Barbara Mensing	Individual	634	23	Fouace (FRA); W 157-149	Serdyuk (UKR); W 161-153	Choe (PRK); L 153-160	did not advance			
Cornelia Pfohl	Individual	635	19	Priestman (GBR); W 159-155	He Y (CHN); L 157-163	did not advance				
Sandra Wagner-Sachse	Individual	628	31	Larsson (SWE); L 146-147	did not advance					
Barbara Mensing; Cornelia Pfohl; Sandra Wagner-Sachse	Team	1897	5	—N/a		Georgia; W 231-216	China; W 240-234	South Korea; L 229-240	Turkey; W 240-234	3rd place, bronze medalist(s)

== Athletics ==
=== Men's track ===
Athlete	Event	Heat		Quarterfinal		Semifinal		Final	
Athlete	Event	Result	Rank	Result	Rank	Result	Rank	Result	Rank
Marc Blume	100 m	10.42	4	did not advance					
Nils Schumann	800 m	1:47.76	1 Q	—N/a		1:44.22	2 Q	1:45.08	1st place, gold medalist(s)
Jirka Arndt	5000 m	13:26.18	9 q	—N/a				13:38.57	8
Falk Balzer	110 m hurdles	13.67	19 Q	13.59	11 Q	13.59	13	did not advance	
Raif Leberer	110 m hurdles	56.74	40 q	13.73	18	did not advance			
Florian Schwarthoff	110 m hurdles	13.55	8 Q	13.54	7 Q	13.39	7 Q	13.42	6
Thomas Goller	400 m hurdles	49.32	5 Q	—N/a		49.28	16	did not advance	
Damian Kallabis	3000 m steeplechase	8:24.48	12 q	—N/a				9:09.78	15
Carsten Eich	Marathon	—N/a						2:24:11	54
Michael Fietz	Marathon	—N/a						2:20:09	37
Andreas Erm	20 km walk	—N/a						1:20:25	5
Robert Ihly	50 km walk	—N/a						DNF	
Denis Trautmann	50 km walk	—N/a						3:58:18	21
Mike Trautmann	50 km walk	—N/a						3:56:19	19

=== Men's field ===
Athlete	Event	Qualification		Final	
Athlete	Event	Distance	Position	Distance	Position
Michael Mollenbeck	Discus throw	62.72	12 Q	63.14	10
Lars Riedel	Discus throw	68.15	1 Q	68.50	2nd place, silver medalist(s)
Jürgen Schult	Discus throw	63.76	8 Q	64.41	8
Markus Esser	Hammer throw	69.51	35	did not advance	
Karsten Kobs	Hammer throw	72.29	31	did not advance	
Heinz Weis	Hammer throw	73.51	26	did not advance	
Raymond Hecht	Javelin throw	84.00	6 Q	87.76	4
Boris Henry	Javelin throw	84.58	5 Q	85.78	7
Danny Ecker	Pole vault	5.70	2 Q	5.80	8
Tim Lobinger	Pole vault	5.65	7 Q	5.50	13
Michael Stolle	Pole vault	5.70	5 Q	5.90	4
Michael Mertens	Shot put	18.72	26	did not advance	
Oliver-Sven Buder	Shot put	19.96	8 Q	20.18	8
Wolfgang Kreissig	High jump	2.27	1 Q	2.29	8
Christian Rhoden	High jump	2.24	16	did not advance	
Kofi Amoah Prah	Long jump	8.01	9 q	8.19	5
Charles Friedek	Triple jump	16.93	9 q	NM	

=== Women's track ===
Athlete	Event	Heat		Quarterfinal		Semifinal		Final	
Athlete	Event	Result	Rank	Result	Rank	Result	Rank	Result	Rank
Sabrina Mulrain	200 m	23.31	25 Q	23.24	24	did not advance			
Andrea Philipp	200 m	DNS		did not advance					
Claudia Gesell	800 m	1:58.56	2 Q	—N/a		1:59.69	11	did not advance	
Irina Mikitenko	5000 m	15:14.76	15 Q	—N/a				14:43.59	5
Petra Wassiluk	10,000 m	33:23.03	25	did not advance					
Heike Meissner	400 m hurdles	55.58	4 Q	—N/a		55.73	12	did not advance	
Ulrike Urbansky	400 m hurdles	55.93	8 Q	—N/a		55.23	10	did not advance	
Sabrina Mulrain; Andrea Philipp; Gabi Rockmeier; Marion Wagner	4 × 100 m relay	42.82	3 Q	—N/a		42.85	7 Q	43.11	6
Florence Ekpo-Umoh; Shanta Ghosh; Birgit Rockmeier; Ulrike Urbansky	4 × 400 m relay	3:27.02	10	did not advance					
Claudia Dreher	Marathon	—N/a						DNS	
Sonja Oberem	Marathon	—N/a						2:33:45	24
Kathrin Born-Boyde	20 km walk	—N/a						DNF	
Beate Gummelt	20 km walk	—N/a						1:34:59	19

=== Women's field ===
Athlete	Event	Qualification		Final	
Athlete	Event	Distance	Position	Distance	Position
Franka Dietzsch	Discus throw	60.74	12 Q	63.18	6
Ilke Wyludda	Discus throw	62.97	4 Q	63.16	7
Kirsten Münchow	Hammer throw	67.64	2 Q	69.28	3rd place, bronze medalist(s)
Steffi Nerius	Javelin throw	65.76	2 Q	64.84	4
Nadine Kleinert-Schmitt	Shot put	18.39	9 Q	18.49	8
Astrid Kumbernuss	Shot put	18.90	5 Q	19.62	3rd place, bronze medalist(s)
Yvonne Buschbaum	Pole vault	4.30	7 Q	4.40	6
Nicole Humbert	Pole vault	4.30	1 Q	4.45	5
Amewu Mensah	High jump	1.94	1 Q	1.93	8
Heike Drechsler	Long jump	6.84	1 Q	6.99	1st place, gold medalist(s)
Sofia Schulte	Long jump	6.23	29	did not advance	
Susen Tiedtke	Long jump	6.65	9 q	6.74	5

=== Combined events ===
Men's decathlon

Athlete	Event	100 m	LJ	SP	HJ	400 m	110H	DT	PV	JT	1500 m	Final	Rank
Frank Busemann	Result	10.91	7.64	14.52	2.09	48.97	14.16	33.71	5.00	64.91	4:25.32	8351	7
Frank Busemann	Points	881	970	760	887	863	954	538	910	812	776	8351	7
Mike Maczey	Result	11.17	7.10	13.84	2.03	49.91	DNF	43.64	5.10	61.49	4:27.99	7228	25
Mike Maczey	Points	823	838	719	831	819	0	739	941	760	758	7228	25
Stefan Schmid	Results	10.94	7.17	14.04	2.00	48.61	14.38	40.81	5.00	67.03	4:36.49	8206	9
Stefan Schmid	Points	874	854	731	803	880	926	681	910	844	703	8206	9

Women's heptathlon

Athlete	Event	100H	HJ	SP	200 m	LJ	JT	800 m	Final	Rank
Sabine Braun	Result	13.49	1.81	14.33	24.74	6.22	48.56	2:19.14	6355	5
Sabine Braun	Points	1052	991	816	911	918	832	835	6355	5
Karin Ertl	Result	13.43	1.78	13.55	24.64	6.22	42.70	2:16.25	6209	7
Karin Ertl	Points	1060	953	764	920	918	719	875	6209	7
Astrid Retzke	Result	13.92	1.57	did not finish						
Astrid Retzke	Points	990	701	did not finish						

== Badminton ==
=== Men ===
Athlete	Event	Round of 32	Round of 16	Quarterfinal	Semifinal	Final / BM	
Athlete	Event	Opposition Score	Opposition Score	Opposition Score	Opposition Score	Opposition Score	Rank
Michael Helber; Björn Siegemund	Men's doubles	Axelsson (SWE) / Jönsson (SWE); L 7–15, 15-17	did not advance				

=== Women ===
Athlete	Event	Round of 64	Round of 32	Round of 16	Quarterfinal	Semifinal	Final / BM	
Athlete	Event	Opposition Score	Opposition Score	Opposition Score	Opposition Score	Opposition Score	Opposition Score	Rank
Nicole Grether	Singles	Krasowska (POL); W 13–12, 11-2	Cator (AUS); W 11–3, 11-3	Kim J-h (KOR); L 0–11, 3-11	did not advance			
Nicole Grether; Karen Neumann	Doubles	—N/a	Jorgensen (DEN) / Vange (DEN); W 15–13, 15-6	Jonathans (NED) / van Hooren (NED); L 7–15, 4-15	did not advance			

=== Mixed ===
Athlete	Event	Round of 32	Round of 16	Quarterfinal	Semifinal	Final / BM	
Athlete	Event	Opposition Score	Opposition Score	Opposition Score	Opposition Score	Opposition Score	Rank
Michael Keck; Nicol Pitro	Doubles	Moody (CAN) / Cloutier (CAN); W 15–6, 15-13	Eriksen (DEN) / Schjoldager (DEN); L 7–15, 6-15	did not advance			
Björn Siegemund; Karen Neumann	Doubles	Zhang J (CHN) / Gao (CHN); L 15–10, 7–15, 10-15	did not advance				

== Beach volleyball ==
=== Men ===
Athlete	Event	Preliminary round	Preliminary elimination	Round of 16	Quarterfinals	Semifinals	Final	
Athlete	Event	Opposition Score	Opposition Score	Opposition Score	Opposition Score	Opposition Score	Opposition Score	Rank
Jörg Ahmann; Axel Hager	Men's	Bosma – Diez (ESP); W 15-13	Bye	Holden – Leinemann (CAN); W 15-6	Bosma – Diez (ESP); W 16-14	de Melo – Santos (BRA); L 5-15	Brenha – Maia (POR); W 2-0	3rd place, bronze medalist(s)
Oliver Oetke; Andreas Scheuerpflug	Men's	Blanton – Fonoimoana (USA); L 7-15	Lebl – Palinek (CZE); L 8-15	did not advance				=19

=== Women ===
Athlete	Event	Preliminary round	Preliminary elimination	Second round	Round of 16	Quarterfinals	Semifinals	Final	
Athlete	Event	Opposition Score	Opposition Score	Opposition Score	Opposition Score	Opposition Score	Opposition Score	Opposition Score	Rank
Maike Friedrichsen; Danja Müsch	Women's	Rigaux – Prawerman (FRA); L 14-16	Huygens-Tholen – Straton (AUS); W 15-9	Karadassiou – Sfyri (GRE); W 15-7	Bede – Behar (BRA); L 9-15	did not advance			=9
Ulrike Schmidt; Gudi Staub	Women's	Tian – Zhang (CHN); W 17-15	Bye		Bruschini – Solazzi (ITA); L 12-15	did not advance			=9

== Boxing ==
Athlete	Event	Round of 32	Round of 16	Quarterfinals	Semifinals	Final	
Athlete	Event	Opposition Result	Opposition Result	Opposition Result	Opposition Result	Opposition Result	Rank
Vardan Zakaryan	Flyweight	Ponlid (THA); L RSC	did not advance				
Falk Huste	Featherweight	Turunen (FIN); W 10-6	Juarez (USA); L 15-17	did not advance			
Norman Schuster	Lightweight	Lopez (VEN); L 10-24	did not advance				
Kay Huste	Light welterweight	Castro (ARG); W 5-3	Paris (ITA); L 11-17	did not advance			
Steven Küchler	Welterweight	Tsie (LES); W RSC	Lorenzo (DOM); W RSC	Simion (ROM); L 14-26	did not advance		
Adnan Ćatić	Light middleweight	Yarbekov (UZB); W 10-6	Rowles (AUS); W RSC	Taylor (USA); L 14-19	did not advance		
Sebastian Köber	Heavyweight	—N/a	Aripgadjiev (AZE); W 9-4	Simmons (CAN); W RSC	Savón (CUB); L 8-14	Did not advance	3rd place, bronze medalist(s)
Cengiz Koc	Super heavyweight	—N/a	Rubalcaba (CUB); L KO	did not advance			

== Canoeing ==
=== Slalom ===
Athlete	Event	Preliminary						Final					
Athlete	Event	Run 1	Rank	Run 2	Rank	Total	Rank	Run 1	Rank	Run 2	Rank	Total	Rank
Sören Kaufmann	Men's slalom C-1	134.36	7	137.54	8	271.90	8 Q	123.83	9	116.35	2	240.18	6
Stefan Pfannmöller	Men's slalom C-1	132.02	2	138.59	11	270.51	7 Q	119.03	4	120.69	6	239.72	5
Andre Ehrenberg; Michael Senft	Men's slalom C-2	134.89	2	144.65	8	279.54	3 Q	125.15	7	176.63	8	301.78	8
Thomas Schmidt	Men's slalom K-1	129.07	11	124.10	1	253.17	1 Q	108.64	1	108.61	1	217.25	1st place, gold medalist(s)
Susanne Hirt	Women's slalom K-1	151.96	11	143.65	3	298.94	8 Q	131.08	9	134.93	12	266.01	10
Mandy Planert	Women's slalom K-1	151.96	9	146.43	7	298.39	7 Q	126.03	4	131.82	8	257.85	6

=== Sprint ===
Men

Athlete	Event	Heats		Semifinals		Final	
Athlete	Event	Time	Rank	Time	Rank	Time	Rank
Andreas Dittmer	C-1 500 m	1:50.340	1 Q	Bye		2:27.591	3rd place, bronze medalist(s)
Andreas Dittmer	C-1 1000 m	3:53.962	1 Q	Bye		3:54.379	1st place, gold medalist(s)
Christian Gille; Thomas Zereske	C-2 500 m	1:43.233	6 Q	Bye		1:59.294	5
Lars Kober; Stefan Uteß	C-2 1000 m	3:39.218	6 q	3:43.032	1 Q	3:41.129	3rd place, bronze medalist(s)
Lutz Liwowski	K-1 500 m	1:41.091	6 q	1:40.586	6 Q	2:00.259	5
Lutz Liwowski	K-1 1000 m	3:36.404	3 q	DSQ		did not advance	
Ronald Rauhe; Tim Wieskötter	K-2 500 m	1:30.502	3 Q	Bye		1:48.771	3rd place, bronze medalist(s)
Andreas Ihle; Olaf Winter	K-2 1000 m	3:14.631	3 Q	Bye		3:16.627	4
Björn Bach; Jan Schäfer; Stefan Ulm; Mark Zabel	K-4 1000 m	2:59.764	2 Q	Bye		2:55.704	2nd place, silver medalist(s)

Women

Athlete	Event	Heats		Semifinals		Final	
Athlete	Event	Time	Rank	Time	Rank	Time	Rank
Manuela Mucke	K-1 500 m	1:54.870	10 q	1:55.794	4	did not advance	
Birgit Fischer; Katrin Wagner	K-2 500 m	1:42.557	2 Q	Bye		1:56.996	1st place, gold medalist(s)
Birgit Fischer; Manuela Mucke; Anett Schuck; Katrin Wagner	K-4 500 m	1:33.895	2 Q	Bye		1:34.532	1st place, gold medalist(s)

== Cycling ==
=== Cross country ===
Athlete	Event	Time	Rank
Carsten Bresser	Men's cross country	2:13:37	8
Lado Fumic	Men's cross country	2:11:57	5
Sabine Spitz	Women's cross country	1:54.46	9
Hedda Zu Putlitz	Women's cross country	1:58.19	13

=== Road Cycling ===
Men

Athlete	Event	Time	Rank
Rolf Aldag	Road race	5:30:46	24
Andreas Klöden	Road race	5:29:20	3rd place, bronze medalist(s)
Jan Ullrich	Road race	5:29:08	1st place, gold medalist(s)
Jens Voigt	Road race	5:30:46	56
Erik Zabel	Road race	5:30.46	14
Andreas Klöden	Time trial	59:33	12
Jan Ullrich	Time trial	57:48	2nd place, silver medalist(s)

Women

Athlete	Event	Time	Rank
Hanka Kupfernagel	Road race	3:06:31	2nd place, silver medalist(s)
Petra Rossner	Road race	3:09:17	30
Ina-Yoko Teutenberg	Road race	DNF	
Judith Arndt	Time trial	43:31	7
Hanka Kupfernagel	Time trial	43:37	8

=== Track cycling ===
Sprint

Athlete	Event	Qualification		Round 1	Repechage 1	Round 2	Repechage 2	Quarterfinals	Semifinals	Final	
Athlete	Event	Time Speed (km/h)	Rank	Opposition Time Speed (km/h)	Opposition Time Speed (km/h)	Opposition Time Speed (km/h)	Opposition Time Speed (km/h)	Opposition Time Speed (km/h)	Opposition Time Speed (km/h)	Opposition Time Speed (km/h)	Rank
Jens Fiedler	Men's sprint	10.287s 69.991 km/h	4 Q	Peden (NZL); W DNS	Bye	Hill (AUS); W 10.682s 67.403	Bye	van Eijden (GER); W 10.966; 10.904	Nothstein (USA); L	Gane (FRA); W 10.732; 10.918	3rd place, bronze medalist(s)
Jan van Eijden	Men's sprint	10.540; 68.311 km/h	11 q	Eadie (AUS); REL	—N/a			Fielder (GER); L	—N/a	Classification 5-8; Eadie (AUS); MacLean (GBR); Villanueva (ESP); W 11.040	5
Kathrin Freitag	Women's sprint	11.792s 61.058 km/h	10	Dubnicoff (CAN); L	Lindenmuth (USA); Ramage (NZL); L	—N/a				Classification 9-12; Kasslin (FIN); Ramage (NZL); Wang (CHN); W 12.971; 55.508	9
Jens Fielder; Soeren Lausberg; Stefan Nimke	Team sprint	45.701s 59.080 km/h	8	France; L	—N/a						7

Pursuit

Athlete	Event	Qualification		Quarterfinals		Semifinals		Final	
Athlete	Event	Time	Rank	Opponent Results	Rank	Opponent Results	Rank	Opponent Results	Rank
Robert Bartko	Men's individual pursuit	4:18.972	1 Q	—N/a		McGee (AUS); W 4:21.067	1 Q	Lehmann (GER); W 4:18.515	1st place, gold medalist(s)
Jens Lehmann	Men's individual pursuit	4:21.350	3 Q	—N/a		Hayles (GBR); W 4:23.032	Q	Bartko (GER); L 4:23.824	2nd place, silver medalist(s)
Judith Arndt	Women's individual pursuit	3:37.609	6	did not advance					
Daniel Becke; Guido Fulst; Jens Lehmann; Olaf Pollack	Team pursuit	4:05.750	4 q	Australia; W 4:01.810 OR	Q	France; W 4:05.930	Q	Ukraine; W 3:59.710 WR	1st place, gold medalist(s)

Time trial

Athlete	Event	Time	Rank
Soeren Lausberg	Men's time trial	1:02.937	4
Stefan Nimke	Men's time trial	1:02.487	2nd place, silver medalist(s)
Kathrin Freitag	Women's time trial	35.473	7
Ulrike Weichelt	Women's time trial	35.315	6

Keirin

Athlete	Event	1st round	Repechage	2nd round	Final
Athlete	Event	Rank	Rank	Rank	Rank
Jens Fielder	Men's keirin	1 Q	—N/a	1 Q	3rd place, bronze medalist(s)
Jan van Eijden	Men's keirin	1 Q	—N/a	2 Q	4

Omnium

Athlete	Event	Points	Laps	Rank
Thorsten Rund	Men's points race	0	0	23
Judith Arndt	Women's points race	12	0	4
Guido Fulst; Olaf Pollack	Men's Madison	9	0	6

== Diving ==
Men

Athlete	Event	Preliminaries		Semifinals				Final		
Athlete	Event	Points	Rank	Points	Rank	Total	Rank	Points	Total	Rank
Stefan Ahrens	3 m springboard	385.50	12	218.67	12	604.17	11	400.50	619.17	9
Andreas Wels	3 m springboard	414.84	6	224.97	7	639.81	6	391.56	616.53	10
Jan Hempel	10 m platform	401.19	14	181.71	12	582.90	15	did not advance		
Heiko Meyer	10 m platform	411.36	12	179.34	16	590.70	12	420.66	600.00	11
Jan Hempel; Heiko Meyer	10 m synchronized platform	—N/a							338.88	3rd place, bronze medalist(s)

Women

Athlete	Event	Preliminaries		Semifinals				Final		
Athlete	Event	Points	Rank	Points	Rank	Total	Rank	Points	Total	Rank
Dörte Lindner	3 m springboard	309.21	4	233.82	5	543.03	5	340.53	574.35	3rd place, bronze medalist(s)
Conny Schmalfuss	3 m springboard	89.46	43	did not advance						
Ditte Kotzian	10 m platform	265.32	20	did not advance						
Ute Wetzig	10 m platform	289.38	11	169.77	9	459.15	11	268.47	438.24	12
Dörte Lindner; Conny Schmalfuss	3 m synchronized springboard	—N/a							263.76	7

== Equestrian ==
=== Dressage ===
Athlete	Horse	Event	Grand Prix		Grand Prix Special			Grand Prix Freestyle		Overall	
Athlete	Horse	Event	Score	Rank	Score	Total	Rank	Score	Rank	Score	Rank
Nadine Capellmann	Farbenfroh	Individual	74.68	4 Q	76.60	151.28	3 Q	74.60	5	225.88	4
Ulla Salzgeber	Rusty	Individual	73.16	7 Q	76.62	149.90	4 Q	80.67	3	230.57	3rd place, bronze medalist(s)
Alexandra Simons de Ridder	Chacomo	Individual	74.28	5 Q	75.62	149.90	4 *	did not advance			
Isabell Werth	Gigolo	Individual	76.32	1 Q	75.67	151.99	2 Q	82.20	2	234.19	2nd place, silver medalist(s)
Nadine Capellmann; Ulla Salzgeber; Alexandra Simons de Ridder; Isabell Werth	See above	Team	5632	1 Q	—N/a					5632	1st place, gold medalist(s)

=== Eventing ===
Athlete	Horse	Event	Dressage		Cross-country		Show jumping		Total	
Athlete	Horse	Event	Penalties	Rank	Penalties	Rank	Penalties	Rank	Penalties	Rank
Marina Köhncke	Longchamps	Individual	34.8	2	did not advance					
Kai Rüder	Butscher	Individual	53.0	25	did not advance					
Annette Wyrwoll	Bantry Bay	Individual	45.0	12	72.8	22	0	1	117.8	19
Andreas Dibowski; Nele Hagener; Ingrid Klimke; Marina Köhncke	Leona's Dancer; Little McMuffin; Sleep Late; Sir Toby 4	Team	150.4	6	92.0	5	36	4	241.8	4

=== Show jumping ===
Athlete	Horse	Event	Qualification								Final				Total	
Athlete	Horse	Event	Round 1		Round 2			Round 3			Round A		Round B		Total	
Athlete	Horse	Event	Penalties	Rank	Penalties	Total	Rank	Penalties	Total	Rank	Penalties	Rank	Penalties	Rank	Penalties	Rank
Otto Becker	Cento	Individual	14.00	43	0.00	14.00	20	0.00	14.00	10 Q	4.00	5	4.00	4	8.00	4
Ludger Beerbaum	Goldfever 3	Individual	1.25	3	20.00	21.25	41	16.25	37.50	49	did not advance					
Marcus Ehning	For Pleasure	Individual	8.75	25	0.00	8.75	10	7.00	15.75	11 Q	4.00	5	4.00	4	8.00	4
Lars Nieberg	Esprit FRH	Individual	9.50	31	8.00	17.50	28	0.00	17.50	14 Q	8.00	14	0.00	1	8.00	4
Otto Becker; Ludger Beerbaum; Marcus Ehning; Lars Nieberg	See above	Team	8.00	1	7.00	15.00	1	—N/a							15.00	1st place, gold medalist(s)

* Simons de Ridder was qualified to compete in the Grand Prix Freestyle but due to a restriction on the number of nation quotas (maximum number is 3), four Germans qualified for the Freestyle event but Simons de Ridder was placed fourth highest of the other German competitors (Capellmann, Salzgeber and Werth) which meant that she could not continue to the final round.

== Fencing ==
18 fencers, 12 men and 6 women, represented Germany in 2000.

Men

Athlete	Event	Round of 64	Round of 32	Round of 16	Quarterfinal	Semifinal	Final / BM	
Athlete	Event	Opposition Score	Opposition Score	Opposition Score	Opposition Score	Opposition Score	Opposition Score	Rank
Jörg Fiedler	Men's épée	Bye	Horbachuk (UKR); L 8-9	did not advance				
Arnd Schmitt	Men's épée	Bye	Bloom (USA); W 15-12	Fischer (SUI); L 10-15	did not advance			
Marc Steifensand	Men's épée	Bye	Lee S-G (KOR); L 8-15	did not advance				
Ralf Bißdorf	Men's foil	Bye	Kruhliak (UKR); W 15-7	Gomes (POR); W 15-11	Marsi (HUN); W 15-13	Ferrari (FRA); W 15-7	Kim Y-H (KOR); L 14-15	2nd place, silver medalist(s)
Richard Breutner	Men's foil	Bye	Deyev (RUS); W 15-10	Mocek (POL); W 15-8	Ferrari (FRA); L 9-15	did not advance		
Wolfgang Wienand	Men's foil	Bye	Marsi (HUN); L 8-15	did not advance				
Dennis Bauer	Men's sabre	Bye	Pina (ESP); W 15-14	Touya (FRA); L 12-15	did not advance			
Wiradech Kothny	Men's sabre	Bye	Lehmann (GER); W 15-8	Sharikov (RUS); W 15-14	Frosin (RUS); W 15-12	Covaliu (ROU); L 12-15	Ferjancsik (HUN); W 15-11	3rd place, bronze medalist(s)
Eero Lehmann	Men's sabre	Bye	Kothny (GER); L 8-15	did not advance				
Jörg Fiedler; Arnd Schmitt; Marc Steifensand; Daniel Strigel	Men's team épée	—N/a		Bye	Cuba; L 44-45	did not advance		
Ralf Bißdorf; Richard Breutner; David Hausmann; Wolfgang Wienand	Men's team foil	—N/a			Poland; L 37-45	did not advance		
Dennis Bauer; Wiradech Kothny; Alexander Weber	Men's team sabre	—N/a			Italy; W 45-42	France; L 44-45	Romania; W 45-27	3rd place, bronze medalist(s)

Women

Athlete	Event	Round of 64	Round of 32	Round of 16	Quarterfinal	Semifinal	Final / BM	
Athlete	Event	Opposition Score	Opposition Score	Opposition Score	Opposition Score	Opposition Score	Opposition Score	Rank
Claudia Bokel	Women's épée	Bye	Andenæs (NOR); W 15-10	Duplitzer (GER); W 15-14	Nagy (HUN); L 8-15	did not advance		
Imke Duplitzer	Women's épée	Bye	Li Na (CHN); W 15-10	Bokel (GER); L 14-15	did not advance			
Katja Nass	Women's épée	Petrova (UZB); W 15-8	Barlois-Mevel-Leroux (FRA); L 12-15	did not advance				
Sabine Bau	Women's foil	Bye	Koltsova (UKR); W 15-6	König (GER); L 11-15	did not advance			
Rita König	Women's foil	Bye	F Zimmermann (USA); W 15-8	Bau (GER); W 15-11	Mohamed (HUN); W 15-8	Trillini (ITA); W 15-10	Vezzali (ITA); L 5-15	2nd place, silver medalist(s)
Monika Weber-Koszto	Women's foil	Bye	Lantos (HUN); W 15-8	Mohamed (HUN); L 10-15	did not advance			
Claudia Bokel; Imke Duplitzer; Katja Nass	Women's team épée	—N/a			Russia; L 43-45	did not advance		
Sabine Bau; Rita König; Monika Weber-Koszto	Women's team foil	—N/a			Russia; W 45-35	Poland; L 34-45	United States; W 45-42	3rd place, bronze medalist(s)

== Football ==
Summary

Key:
- FT – After full time.
- P – Match decided by penalty-shootout.

Team	Event	Group Stage				Semifinal	Final / BM	
Team	Event	Opposition Score	Opposition Score	Opposition Score	Rank	Opposition Score	Opposition Score	Rank
Germany women's	Women's tournament	Australia; W 3–0	Brazil; W 2–1	Sweden; W 1–0	1 Q	Norway; L 0–1	Bronze medal game Brazil; W 2-0	3rd place, bronze medalist(s)

=== Women's tournament ===
Roster

Goalkeepers

- Nadine Angerer (FC Bayern Munich)
- Silke Rottenberg (FC Brauweiler Pulheim 2000)

Defenders

- Doris Fitschen (1.FFC Frankfurt)
- Jeanette Götte (FFC Flaesheim Hillen)
- Stefanie Gottschlich (WSV Wolfsburg-Wendschott)
- Steffi Jones (1.FFC Frankfurt)
- Sandra Minnert (1.FFC Frankfurt)
- Kerstin Stegemann (FFC Flaesheim Hillen)
- Tina Wunderlich (1.FFC Frankfurt)

Midfielders

- Ariane Hingst (1.FFC Turbine Potsdam)
- Melanie Hoffmann (FCR Duisburg)
- Renate Lingor (1.FFC Turbine Potsdam)
- Nicole Brandebusemeyer (FC Brauweiler Pulheim 2000)
- Bettina Wiegmann (FC Brauweiler Pulheim 2000)

Forwards

- Inka Grings (FCR Duisburg)
- Maren Meinert (FC Brauweiler Pulheim 2000)
- Claudia Müller (WSV Wolfsburg-Wendschott)
- Birgit Prinz (1.FFC Frankfurt)

Group stage

Team	Pld	W	D	L	GF	GA	GD	Pts
Germany	3	3	0	0	6	1	+5	9
Brazil	3	2	0	1	5	3	+2	6
Sweden	3	0	1	2	1	4	−3	1
Australia	3	0	1	2	2	6	−4	1

13 September 2000
17:00

Australia	0–3	Germany
	Report	Grings 39'; Wiegmann 70'; Lingor 90'

Bruce Stadium, Canberra
Attendance: 24,800
Referee: Bola Abidoye (Nigeria)

16 September 2000
17:30

Germany	2–1	Brazil
Prinz 33', 41'	Report	Raquel 72'

Bruce Stadium, Canberra
Attendance: 17,000
Referee: Martha Toro (Colombia)

19 September 2000
17:30

Germany	1–0	Sweden
Hingst 88'	Report

Melbourne Cricket Ground, Melbourne
Attendance: 7,000
Referee: Wendy Toms (Great Britain)

Semi-finals

24 September 2000
17:30

Germany	0–1	Norway
	Report	Wunderlich 80' (o.g.)

Sydney Football Stadium, Sydney
Attendance: 16,710
Referee: Im Eun Ju (South Korea)

Bronze medal match

28 September 2000
17:00

Germany	2–0	Brazil
Lingor 64'; Prinz 79'	Report

Sydney Football Stadium, Sydney
Attendance: 11,200
Referee: Im Eun Ju (South Korea)

== Gymnastics ==
=== Men ===
Team

Athlete	Event	Qualification								Final							
Athlete	Event	Apparatus						Total	Rank	Apparatus						Total	Rank
Athlete	Event	F	PH	R	V	PB	HB	Total	Rank	F	PH	R	V	PB	HB	Total	Rank
Jan-Peter Nikiferow	Team	8.962	9.700	—N/a	9.625	8.975	9.325	46.587	60	did not advance							
Dimitrij Nonin	Team	8.900	9.500	9.550	8.975	9.437	9.687	56.049	29 Q	did not advance							
Sergej Pfeifer	Team	9.137	9.200	9.600	—N/a	9.600	9.012	46.549	61	did not advance							
Marius Tobă	Team	—N/a	9.375	9.700 Q	9.187	9.075	—N/a	37.337	74	did not advance							
Rene Tschernitschek	Team	9.037	—N/a	9.362	9.212	—N/a	9.387	36.998	77	did not advance							
Andreas Wecker	Team	8.962	9.675	9.250	8.912	9.550	9.662	56.011	30 Q	did not advance							
Total	Team	37.636	36.824	38.799	38.199	38.386	38.136	225.282	10	did not advance							

Individual events

Athlete	Event	Apparatus						Total	Rank
Athlete	Event	F	PH	R	V	PB	HB	Total	Rank
Dimitrij Nonin	All-around	8.937	9.437	9.587	9.012	9.587	9.750	56.310	21
Marius Tobă	Rings	—N/a		9.675	—N/a			9.675	6

== Handball ==
=== Summary ===
Key:

- A.E.T – After extra time.
- P – Match decided by penalty-shootout.

Team	Event	Group stage						Quarterfinal	Semifinal	Final / BM	
Team	Event	Opposition Score	Opposition Score	Opposition Score	Opposition Score	Opposition Score	Rank	Opposition Score	Opposition Score	Opposition Score	Rank
Germany men's	Men's tournament	Cuba; W 30–22	South Korea; D 24–24	FR Yugoslavia; W 28–22	Russia; W 25–23	Egypt; L 21–22	2 Q	Spain; L 26–27	Egypt; W 24–18	France; W 25–22	5

=== Men's team ===
Team roster

- Markus Baur
- Frank von Behren
- Mike Bezdicek
- Henning Fritz
- Jan Holpert
- Florian Kehrmann
- Stefan Kretzschmar
- Jörg Kunze
- Sven Lakenmacher
- Klaus-Dieter Petersen
- Bernd Roos
- Christian Schwarzer
- Daniel Stephan
- Bogdan Wenta
- Volker Zerbe

Summary

Qualified to quarterfinals

Pos	Team	Pld	W	D	L	GF	GA	GD	Pts	Qualification
1	Russia	5	4	0	1	129	121	+8	8	Quarterfinals
2	Germany	5	3	1	1	128	113	+15	7	Quarterfinals
3	FR Yugoslavia	5	3	0	2	130	127	+3	6 (Note: Yugoslavia 25–22 Egypt)	Quarterfinals
4	Egypt	5	3	0	2	122	115	+7	6	Quarterfinals
5	South Korea	5	1	1	3	128	131	−3	3	9th place game
6	Cuba	5	0	0	5	128	158	−30	0	11th place game

Notes:

Results

16 September 2000; 9:30	Germany	30 – 20	Cuba	Pavilion 2, Sydney

18 September 2000; 9:30	South Korea	24 – 24	Germany	Pavilion 2, Sydney

20 September 2000; 21:30	Germany	28 – 22	FR Yugoslavia	Pavilion 2, Sydney

24 September 2000; 16:30	Egypt	22 – 21	Germany	Pavilion 2, Sydney

Quarterfinals

26 September 2000; 16:30	Germany	26 – 27	Spain	Pavilion 2, Sydney

5−8th place semifinals

29 September 2000; 11:30	Egypt	18 – 24	Germany	The Dome, Sydney

5/6th classification game

30 September 2000; 16:30	Germany	25 – 22	France	The Dome, Sydney

== Hockey ==
=== Men ===
Team roster

- Clemens Arnold
- Christoph Bechmann
- Philipp Crone
- Oliver Domke
- Christoph Eimer
- Björn Emmerling
- Michael Green
- Florian Kunz
- Christian Mayerhöfer
- Björn Michel
- Ulrich Moissl
- Sascha Reinelt
- Christopher Reitz
- Christian Wein
- Tibor Weißenborn
- Matthias Witthaus
- Head coach: Paul Lissek

Summary

Key:
- FT – After full time.
- P – Match decided by penalty-shootout.

Team	Event	Group Stage						Quarterfinal	Semifinal	Final / BM	
Team	Event	Opposition Score	Opposition Score	Opposition Score	Opposition Score	Opposition Score	Rank	Opposition Score	Opposition Score	Opposition Score	Rank
Germany men's	Men's tournament	Malaysia; W 1–0	Canada; W 2–1	Pakistan; D 1–1	Netherlands; D 2–2	Great Britain; L 1–2	3	—N/a	5/8th place crossover Argentina; W 6–2	5/6th place game Great Britain; W 4–0	5

=== Women ===
Team roster

- Friederike Barth
- Britta Becker
- Birgit Beyer
- Caroline Casaretto
- Tanja Dickenscheid
- Nadine Ernsting-Krienke
- Simone Grässer
- Franziska Gude
- Katrin Kauschke
- Natascha Keller
- Denise Klecker
- Heike Lätzsch
- Inga Möller
- Fanny Rinne
- Marion Rodewald
- Julia Zwehl
- Head coach: Berti Rauth

Summary

Key:
- FT – After full time.
- P – Match decided by penalty-shootout.

Team	Event	Group Stage					Quarterfinal	Semifinal	Final / BM	
Team	Event	Opposition Score	Opposition Score	Opposition Score	Opposition Score	Rank	Opposition Score	Opposition Score	Opposition Score	Rank
Germany men's	Women's tournament	New Zealand; D 1–1	South Africa; W 2–1	China; L 1–2	Netherlands; D 2–2	4	—N/a	7/10th place crossover South Korea; W 3–2 (a.e.t)	7/8th place game Great Britain; W 2-0	7

== Judo ==
=== Men ===
Athlete	Event	Round of 32	Round of 16	Quarterfinals	Semifinals	Repechage 1	Repechage 2	Repechage 3	Final / BM	
Athlete	Event	Opposition Result	Opposition Result	Opposition Result	Opposition Result	Opposition Result	Opposition Result	Opposition Result	Opposition Result	Rank
Oliver Gussenberg	60kg	Donbay (KAZ); L 0010-1100	did not advance							
Martin Schmidt	73kg	Moussa (TUN); L 0001-0010	did not advance							
Florian Wanner	81kg	Reiter (AUT); W 0010-0001	Cho (KOR); L 0000-1001	did not advance						
Marko Spittka	90kg	Olson (USA); L 0001-0010	did not advance							
Daniel Gürschner	100kg	Sabino (BRA); L 0010-1020	did not advance							
Frank Möller	+100kg	Miran (IRI); W 0001-0001	Tmenov (RUS); L 0000-1000	did not advance						

=== Women ===
Athlete	Event	Round of 32	Round of 16	Quarterfinals	Semifinals	Repechage 1	Repechage 2	Repechage 3	Final / BM	
Athlete	Event	Opposition Result	Opposition Result	Opposition Result	Opposition Result	Opposition Result	Opposition Result	Opposition Result	Opposition Result	Rank
Anna-Maria Gradante	48kg	—N/a	Martins (BRA); W	Simons (BEL); W	Bruletova (RUS); L	Bye			Zhao S (CHN); W	3rd place, bronze medalist(s)
Anja von Rekowski	63kg	—N/a	Dhahri (TUN); W	Roberts (GBR); W	Vandenhende (FRA); L	Bye			Vandecaveye (BEL); L	5
Yvonne Wansart	70kg	Rambault (FRA); W	Veranes (CUB); L	Bye			Bacher (USA); W	Scapin (ITA); L	did not advance	
Uta Kühnen	78kg	Engoang (GAB); W	Lee S-y (KOR); L	did not advance						
Sandra Köppen	+78kg	Prokofyeva (UKR); W	Hefny (EGY); W	Cicot (FRA); W	Yuan H (CHN); L	Bye			Kim S-y (KOR); L	5

== Modern pentathlon ==
Athlete	Event	Shooting (10 m air pistol)			Fencing (épée one touch)			Swimming (200 m freestyle)			Riding (show jumping)			Running (3000 m)			Total points	Final rank
Athlete	Event	Points	Rank	MP Points	Results	Rank	MP points	Time	Rank	MP points	Penalties	Rank	MP points	Time	Rank	MP Points	Total points	Final rank
Eric Walther	Men's	170	21	976	7	23	640	2:00.71	1	1293	120	9	980	9:37.91	11	1090	4979	16
Elena Reiche	Women's	174	14	1024	11	16	800	2:27.51	14	1125	493	21	607	12:23.49	21	748	4302	21

== Rhythmic gymnastics ==
Group all-around

Athlete	Event	Qualification				Final			
Athlete	Event	Clubs	Rope + Hoops	Total	Rank	Clubs	Rope + Hoops	Total	Rank
Friederike Arit; Susan Benicke; Jeanine Fissler; Selma Neuhaus; Jessica Schumacher; Annika Seibel	Group all-around	19.416	19.183	38.599	5 Q	19.533	19.366	38.899	4

Individual all-around

Athlete	Event	Qualification						Final					
Athlete	Event	Rope	Hoop	Ball	Ribbon	Total	Rank	Rope	Hoop	Ball	Ribbon	Total	Rank
Helene Asmus	Individual	9.429	9.616	9.641	9.625	38.311	17	did not advance					
Edita Schaufler	Individual	9.775	9.783	9.366	9.783	38.707	12	did not advance					

== Rowing ==
=== Men ===
Athlete	Event	Heats		Repechage		Semifinals		Final	
Athlete	Event	Time	Rank	Time	Rank	Time	Rank	Time	Rank
Marcel Hacker	Single sculls	6:58.31	1 Q	—N/a		7:03.47	2 FA	6:50.83	3rd place, bronze medalist(s)
Detlef Kirchhoff; Robert Sens	Coxless pair	7:10.62	4 R	6:45.73	1 Q	6:38.41	4 FB	6:37.94	9
Sebastian Mayer; Stefan Roehnert	Double sculls	6:34.66	2 R	6:27.58	1 SA/B	6:20.40	2 FA	6:23.58	4
Ingo Euler; Bernhard Rühling	Lightweight double sculls	6:40.53	2 R	6:36.26	1 SA/B	6:24.55	3 FA	6:26.54	4
Jörg Dießner; Jan Herzog; Ike Landvoigt; Dirk Meusel	Coxless four	6:13.62	3 Q	—N/a		6:15.12	5 FB	6:08.11	11
Marco Geisler; Andreas Hajek; Stephan Volkert; Andre Willms	Quadruple sculls	5:51.60	1 Q	—N/a		5:48.92	1 FA	5:48.64	3rd place, bronze medalist(s)
Roland Händle; Marcus Mielke; Björn Spaeter; Thorsten Schmidt	Lightweight coxless four	6:16.37	3 SA/B	—N/a		6:15.75	6 FB	6:15.31	12

Reserves

- Martin Weis
- Bernd Heidicker
- Jörg Lehnigk
- Philipp Stüer

=== Women ===
Athlete	Event	Heats		Repechage		Semifinals		Final	
Athlete	Event	Time	Rank	Time	Rank	Time	Rank	Time	Rank
Katrin Rutschow-Stomporowski	Single sculls	7:32.80	1 Q	—N/a		7:37.77	1 FA	7:28.99	3rd place, bronze medalist(s)
Claudia Barth; Lenka Wech	Coxless pair	7:20.23	3 R	7:20.12	2 FA	—N/a		7:20.08	6
Kathrin Boron; Jana Thieme	Double sculls	7:04.74	1 Q	—N/a				6:55.44	1st place, gold medalist(s)
Claudia Blasberg; Valerie Viehoff	Lightweight double sculls	7:11.27	1 Q	—N/a		7:02.46	2 FA	7:02.95	2nd place, silver medalist(s)
Meike Evers; Kerstin Kowalski; Manja Kowalski; Manuela Lutze	Quadruple sculls	6:25.98	1 Q	—N/a				6:19.58	1st place, gold medalist(s)

Reserves

- Angelika Brand
- Peggy Waleska

== Sailing ==
Thirteen men and four women competed in ten Sailing event competitions, winning one silver medal and one bronze medal.

Men

Athlete	Event	Race											Net points	Final rank
Athlete	Event	1	2	3	4	5	6	7	8	9	10	M*	Net points	Final rank
Alexander Baronjan	Mistral	13	5	6	5	10	11	9	(37); DNF	17	8	18	84	9
Michael Fellmann	Finn	18	(23)	20	5	(24)	18	20	18	19	15	12	145	21
Stefan Meister; Frank Thieme	470	20	18	(24)	(26)	24	15	7	13	4	24	5	130	17

Women

Athlete	Event	Race											Net points	Final rank
Athlete	Event	1	2	3	4	5	6	7	8	9	10	M*	Net points	Final rank
Amelie Lux	Mistral	1	2	1	1	(4)	2	2	(3)	2	2	2	22	2nd place, silver medalist(s)
Petra Niemann	Europe	13	6	18	3	9	15	(-28); OCS	(-28); OCS	5	9	9	87	13
Nicola Birkner; Wibke Buelle	470	8	2	4	6	12	4	(-20); OCS	13	1	4	(15)	54	5

Open
Fleet racing

Athlete	Event	Race																Net points	Final rank
Athlete	Event	1	2	3	4	5	6	7	8	9	10	11	12	13	14	15	16	Net points	Final rank
Marcus Baur; Philip Barth	49er	5	1	4	3	(11)	(12)	11	5	6	9	6	6	10	3	6	6	81	5
Roland Gaebler; Rene Schwall	Tornado	(10)	4	8	5	3	(11)	7	2	1	1	7	—N/a					38	3rd place, bronze medalist(s)
Marc Aurel Pickel; Thomas Auracher	Star	11	6	2	13	10	8	11	13	8	(15)	(17); DSQ	—N/a					82	12

Match racing

Athlete	Event	Qualification races						Total	Rank	Round Robin					Rank	Quarterfinals	Semifinals	Final / BM	Rank
Athlete	Event	1	2	3	4	5	6	Total	Rank	FRA	DEN	SWE	GBR	UKR	Rank	Quarterfinals	Semifinals	Final / BM	Rank
Gunnar Bahr; Ingo Borkowski; Jochen Schuemann	Soling	~~14~~	10	3	7	10	11	41	10 Q	W	L	W	W	W	1 Q	DEN W NED W NOR W NZL W RUS L 3-2; 2 Q	Netherlands; W 3-1	Denmark; L 3-4	2nd place, silver medalist(s)

== Shooting ==
Men

Athlete	Event	Qualification		Final	
Athlete	Event	Points	Rank	Total	Rank
Christian Bauer	50 m rifle three positions	1169	6 Q	1266.0	6
Hans-Jürgen Bauer-Neumaier	10 m air pistol	575	20	did not advance	
Hans-Jürgen Bauer-Neumaier	50 m pistol	553	20	did not advance	
Maik Eckhardt	50 m rifle three positions	1157	25	did not advance	
Maik Eckhardt	50 m rifle prone	596	7 Q	699.8	4
Norbert Ettner	10 m air rifle	589	15	did not advance	
Thomas Fichtner	Trap	114	9	did not advance	
Artur Gevorgjan	10 m air pistol	575	20	did not advance	
Artur Gevorgjan	50 m pistol	543	32	did not advance	
Jan-Henrik Heinrich	Skeet	121	14	did not advance	
Michael Jakosits	10 m running target	570	12	did not advance	
Manfred Kurzer	10 m running target	573	7 Q	671.3	6
Daniel Leonhard	25 m rapid fire pistol	584	9	did not advance	
Waldemar Schanz	Trap	113	13	did not advance	
Waldemar Schanz	Double trap	136	7	did not advance	
Swen Schuller	50 m rifle prone	592	25	did not advance	
Ralf Schumann	25 m rapid fire pistol	584	7 Q	683.3	5
Ferdinand Stipberger	10 m air rifle	584	37	did not advance	

Women

Athlete	Event	Qualification		Final	
Athlete	Event	Points	Rank	Total	Rank
Petra Horneber	10 m air rifle	393	9	did not advance	
Petra Horneber	50 m rifle three positions	575	17	did not advance	
Susanne Kiermayer	Trap	66	5 Q	86	5
Susanne Kiermayer	Double trap	98	9	did not advance	
Carmen Meininger	10 m air pistol	373	32	did not advance	
Carmen Meininger	25 m pistol	576	18	did not advance	
Sonja Pfeilschifter	10 m air rifle	395	3 Q	495.9	5
Sonja Pfeilschifter	50 m rifle three positions	585	1 Q	678.5	4
Alexandra Schneider	50 m rifle three positions	578	11	did not advance	
Anke Schumann	10 m air pistol	378	21	did not advance	
Anke Schumann	25 m pistol	562	39	did not advance	

== Swimming ==
=== Men ===
Athlete	Event	Heat		Semifinal		Final	
Athlete	Event	Time	Rank	Time	Rank	Time	Rank
Stephan Kunzelmann	50 m freestyle	23.08	28	did not advance			
Torsten Spanneberg	100 m freestyle	50.56	25	did not advance			
Christian Tröger	100 m freestyle	49.76	13 Q	49.80	14	did not advance	
Stefan Herbst	200 m freestyle	1:49.84	12 Q	1:49.72	13	did not advance	
Stefan Pohl	200 m freestyle	1:50.07	14 Q	1:50.56	16	did not advance	
Heiko Hell	400 m freestyle	3:50.80	9	did not advance			
Heiko Hell	1500 m freestyle	15:11.91	7 Q	—N/a		15:19.87	8
Steffen Driesen	100 m backstroke	55.39	7 Q	55.41	8 Q	55.27	7
Stev Theloke	100 m backstroke	55.00	3 Q	54.95	4 Q	54.82	3rd place, bronze medalist(s)
Ralf Braun	200 m backstroke	2:01.35	21	did not advance			
Jens Kruppa	100 m breaststroke	1:02.09	9 Q	1:01.92	11	did not advance	
Mark Warnecke	100 m breaststroke	1:02.85	20	did not advance			
Jens Kruppa	200 m breaststroke	DNS		did not advance			
Christian Keller	100 m butterfly	DNS		did not advance			
Thomas Rupprath	100 m butterfly	53.57	13 Q	53.18	7 Q	53.13	7
Thomas Rupprath	200 m butterfly	1:58.32	11 Q	1:58.96	15	did not advance	
Christian Keller	200 m individual medley	2:02.09	6 Q	2:01.23	3 Q	2:02.02	6
Jens Kruppa	200 m individual medley	2:03.08	14 Q	2:02.55	12	did not advance	
Jirka Letzin	400 m individual medley	4:18.63	9	did not advance			
* Lars Conrad; Stefan Herbst; Stephan Kunzelmann; Torsten Spanneberg; Christian Tröger	4 × 100 m freestyle relay	3:18.70	3 Q	—N/a		3:17.77	4
* Heiko Hell; Stefan Herbst; Christian Keller * Michael Kiedel; Stefan Pohl * Christian Tröger	4 × 200 m freestyle relay	7:19.95	4 Q	—N/a		7:20.19	6
Jens Kruppa; Thomas Rupprath; Torsten Spanneberg; Stev Theloke	4 × 100 m medley relay	3:38.50	1 Q	—N/a		3:35.88	3rd place, bronze medalist(s)

=== Women ===
Athlete	Event	Heat		Semifinal		Final	
Athlete	Event	Time	Rank	Time	Rank	Time	Rank
Katrin Meissner	50 m freestyle	25.64	10 Q	25.62	11	did not advance	
Sandra Volker	50 m freestyle	25.44	6 Q	25.22	5 Q	25.27	6
Antje Buschschulte	100 m freestyle	DNS		did not advance			
Sandra Volker	100 m freestyle	55.54	7 Q	55.97	15	did not advance	
Franziska van Almsick	200 m freestyle	2:00.37	7 Q	2:00.26	9	did not advance	
Kerstin Kielgass	200 m freestyle	2:00.25	6 Q	1:59.78	6 Q	1:58.86	4
Kerstin Kielgass	400 m freestyle	4:13.10	15	did not advance			
Hannah Stockbauer	400 m freestyle	4:10.76	6 Q	—N/a		4:10.38	6
Jana Henke	800 m freestyle	8:31.86	6 Q	—N/a		8:31.97	7
Hannah Stockbauer	800 m freestyle	8:31.74	5 Q	—N/a		8:30.11	5
Antje Buschschulte	100 m backstroke	1:02.23	9 Q	1:01.91	9	did not advance	
Sandra Volker	100 m backstroke	1:02.88	13 Q	1:03.01	15	did not advance	
Antje Buschschulte	200 m backstroke	2:13.42	8 Q	2:12.64	6 Q	2:13.31	7
Cathleen Rund	200 m backstroke	2:13.87	11 Q	2:13.85	10	did not advance	
Sylvia Gerasch	100 m breaststroke	1:09.31	8 Q	1:09.33	8 Q	1:09.86	8
Simone Karn	100 m breaststroke	1:09.94	14 Q	1:09.85	14	did not advance	
Ina Hüging	200 m breaststroke	2:30.00	18	did not advance			
Anne Poleska	200 m breaststroke	2:29.15	15 Q	2:28.99	12	did not advance	
Franziska van Almsick	100 m butterfly	Withdrew					
Daniela Samulski	100 m butterfly	1:01.31	27	did not advance			
Franziska van Almsick	200 m butterfly	2:15.68	28	did not advance			
Sabine Herbst	200 m individual medley	2:17.18	16 Q	2:17.51	15	did not advance	
Nicole Hetzer	200 m individual medley	2:16.98	15 Q	2:18.08	16	did not advance	
Sabine Herbst	400 m individual medley	4:47.79	16	did not advance			
Nicole Hetzer	400 m individual medley	4:43.23	7 Q	—N/a		4:43.56	5
Franziska van Almsick; Antje Buschschulte * Kerstin Kielgass; Katrin Meissner * Daniela Samulski * Britta Steffen; Sandra Volker	4 × 100 m freestyle relay	3:43.22	4 Q	—N/a		3:40.31	4
Franziska van Almsick; Antje Buschschulte * Meike Freitag; Sara Harstick; Kerstin Kielgass * Britta Steffen	4 × 200 m freestyle relay	8:06.52	5 Q	—N/a		7:58.64	3rd place, bronze medalist(s)
Franziska van Almsick; Antje Buschschulte; Sylvia Gerasch; Katrin Meissner	4 × 100 m medley relay	4:06.02	3 Q	—N/a		4:04.33	4

Key: * – swimmers who only competed in the preliminary heats.

== Table tennis ==
=== Men ===
Athlete	Event	Group stage			Round of 32	Round of 16	Quarterfinals	Semifinals	Final / BM	
Athlete	Event	Opposition Result	Opposition Result	Rank	Opposition Result	Opposition Result	Opposition Result	Opposition Result	Opposition Result	Rank
Timo Boll	Men's singles	Liu S (ARG); W 3–1	Al-Hammadi (QAT); W 3-0	1 Q	Kim T-S (KOR); W 3-1	Schlager (AUT); L 2-3	did not advance			
Peter Franz	Men's singles	Syed (GBR); W 3-0	Sahajasein (MRI); W 3-0	1 Q	Persson (SWE); L 1-3	did not advance				
Jörg Roßkopf	Men's singles	Zhuang (USA); W 3-0	Helmy (EGY); W 3-0	1 Q	Karlsson (SWE); W 3-2	Tasaki (JPN); W 3-2	Liu G (CHN); L 0-3	did not advance		
Timo Boll; Jörg Roßkopf	Men's doubles	Grujić (YUG) / Lupulesku (YUG); L 0-2	Clarke (AUS) / Plumb (AUS); W 2-0	2	did not advance					

=== Women ===
Athlete	Event	Group stage			Round of 32	Round of 16	Quarterfinals	Semifinals	Final / BM	
Athlete	Event	Opposition Result	Opposition Result	Rank	Opposition Result	Opposition Result	Opposition Result	Opposition Result	Opposition Result	Rank
Qianhong Gotsch	Women's singles	Bye			Sakata (JPN); W 3-0	Suk (KOR); W 3-2	Chen J (TPE); L 2-3	did not advance		
Jie Schopp	Women's singles	Bye			Chen-Tong (TPE); L 2-3	did not advance				
Jing Tian-Zorner	Women's singles	Bye			Svensson (SWE); L 2-3	did not advance				
Qianhong Gotsch; Jie Schopp	Women's doubles	Gao (USA) / Do (USA); W 2-1	Wang (CAN) / Xu (CAN); W 2-0	1 Q	—N/a	Bátorfi (HUN) / Tóth (HUN); L 0-3	did not advance			
Elke Schall; Nicole Struse	Women's doubles	C Li (NZL) / K Li (NZL); W 2-1	Banh Thua (USA) / Rather (USA); W 2-0	1 Q	—N/a	Li Ju (CHN) / Wang N (CHN); L 0-3	did not advance			

== Taekwondo ==
Athlete	Event	Round of 16	Quarterfinals	Semifinals	Repechage 1	Repechage 2	Final / BM	
Athlete	Event	Opposition Result	Opposition Result	Opposition Result	Opposition Result	Opposition Result	Opposition Result	Rank
Aziz Acharki	Men's 68kg	Ogoudjobi (BEN); W 7-0	Bernasconi (MON); W 15-1	López (USA); L 0-2	—N/a	Çalışkan (AUT); L 7-8	did not advance	
Faissal Ebnoutalib	Men's 80kg	Al-Fararjeh (JOR); W 8-2	Hansen (AUS); W 2-1	Konan (CIV); W 4-3	—N/a		Matos (CUB); L 1-3	2nd place, silver medalist(s)
Fadime Helvacioglu	Women's 49kg	Chi (TPE); L 0-1	did not advance					

== Tennis ==
=== Men ===
Athlete	Event	Round of 64	Round of 32	Round of 16	Quarterfinals	Semifinals	Final / BM	
Athlete	Event	Opposition Score	Opposition Score	Opposition Score	Opposition Score	Opposition Score	Opposition Score	Rank
Tommy Haas	Singles	Ferreira (RSA); W 7–5, 6-2	Vinciguerra (SWE); W 4–6, 6–4, 6-2	Corretja (ESP); W 7–6, 6-3	Mirnyi (BLR); W 4–6, 7–5, 6-3	Federer (SUI); W 6–3, 6-2	Kafelnikov (RUS); L 6–7, 6–3, 2–6, 6–4, 3-6	2nd place, silver medalist(s)
Nicolas Kiefer	Singles	Di Pasquale (FRA); L 6–4, 6-3	did not advance					
David Prinosil	Singles	Federer (SUI); L 2–6, 2-6	did not advance					
Rainer Schüttler	Singles	Martin (USA); W 6–2, 6-0	Kuerten (BRA); L 4–6, 4-6	did not advance				
Tommy Haas; David Prinosil	Doubles	—N/a	Black (ZIM) / Ullyett (ZIM); W 6–1, 6-4	Lee H-T (KOR) / Yoon Y-I (KOR); W 6–4, 7-5	Lareau (CAN) / Nestor (CAN); L 0–6, 4-6	did not advance		

=== Women ===
Athlete	Event	Round of 64	Round of 32	Round of 16	Quarterfinals	Semifinals	Final / BM	
Athlete	Event	Opposition Score	Opposition Score	Opposition Score	Opposition Score	Opposition Score	Opposition Score	Rank
Jana Kandarr	Singles	Likhovtseva (RUS); W 6–4, 6-4	Gagliardi (SUI); W 7–5, 6-4	V Williams (USA); L 2–6, 2-6	did not advance			

== Trampolining ==
Athlete	Event	Qualification		Final	
Athlete	Event	Score	Rank	Score	Rank
Michael Serth	Men's	65.60	9	did not advance	
Anna Dogonadze	Women's	65.20	1 Q	5.00	8

== Triathlon ==
Athlete	Event	Swim (1.5 km)	Bike (40 km)	Run (10 km)	Total Time	Rank
Andreas Raelert	Men's	18:13.29	59:09.80	32:08.19	1:49:31.28	12
Stephan Vuckovic	Men's	18:35.59	58:52.10	31:09.89	1:48:37.58	2nd place, silver medalist(s)
Anja Dittmer	Women's	20:30.08	1:06.58.30	37:08.40	2:04:36.88	18
Joelle Franzmann	Women's	19:41.48	1:05:35.60	40:09.88	2:05:26.96	21

== Volleyball ==
Team roster

- Christina Benecke
- Beatrice Dömeland
- Judith Flemig
- Angelina Grün
- Tanja Hart
- Susanne Lahme
- Hanka Pachale
- Anja-Nadin Pietrek
- Sylvia Roll
- Christina Schultz
- Judith Sylvester
- Kerstin Tzscherlich
- Head coach: Lee Hee-Wan

Results

Team	Event	Group Stage						Quarterfinal	Semifinal	Final / BM	
Team	Event	Opposition Score	Opposition Score	Opposition Score	Opposition Score	Opposition Score	Rank	Opposition Score	Opposition Score	Opposition Score	Rank
Germany women's	Women's tournament	Cuba; W 3-0	South Korea; L 0-3	Peru; W 3-0	Russia; L 2-3	Italy; W 3-1	4 Q	Brazil; L 0-3	5−8th place match Croatia; W 3-1	5/6th place China; L 1-3	6

== Weightlifting ==
Men

Athlete	Event	Snatch			Clean & Jerk			Total	Rank
Athlete	Event	1	2	3	1	2	3	Total	Rank
Ingo Steinhöfel	-77kg	155.0	~~160.0~~	160.0	190.0	~~195.0~~	~~195.0~~	350.0	7
Marc Huster	– 85 kg	172.5	~~177.5~~	177.5	205.0	210.0	212.5	390.0	2nd place, silver medalist(s)
Lars Betker	-94kg	~~165.0~~	165.0	~~170.0~~	200.0	~~207.5~~	~~212.5~~	365.0	17
Ronny Weller	+ 105 kg	200.0	~~207.5~~	210.0	250.0	257.5	262.5	467.5	2nd place, silver medalist(s)

Women

Athlete	Event	Snatch			Clean & Jerk			Total	Rank
Athlete	Event	1	2	3	1	2	3	Total	Rank
Monique Riesterer	+ 75 kg	105.0	110.0	112.5	127.5	132.5	~~137.5~~	245.0	6

== Wrestling ==
Freestyle

Athlete	Event	Elimination Pool				Quarterfinal	Semifinal	Final / BM	
Athlete	Event	Opposition Result	Opposition Result	Opposition Result	Rank	Opposition Result	Opposition Result	Opposition Result	Rank
Vasilij Zeiher	54kg	Achilov (UZB); L 2-9	Mamyrov (KAZ); L 1-8	—N/a	3	did not advance			
Othmar Kuhner	58kg	Abdullayev (AZE); L 8-5	Berberyan (ARM); L 2-14	Buslovych (UKR); L 1-4	4	did not advance			
Jürgen Scheibe	63kg	Barzakov (BUL); L 0-3	Bodișteanu (MDA); L 0-10	—N/a	3	did not advance			
Alexander Leipold	76kg	Disqualified due to doping; he was stripped of his gold medal							
Arawat Sabejew	97kg	Kurtanidze (GEO); L 1-3	Pauliukonis (LTU); W 5-1	—N/a	2	did not advance			
Sven Thiele	130kg	Pecha (SVK); W 10-0	Musulbes (RUS); L 0-5	—N/a	2	did not advance			7

Greco-Roman

Athlete	Event	Elimination Pool				Quarterfinal	Semifinal	Final / BM	
Athlete	Event	Opposition Result	Opposition Result	Opposition Result	Rank	Opposition Result	Opposition Result	Opposition Result	Rank
Alfred Ter-Mkrtychyan	54kg	Tsertsvadze (GEO); W 5-0	Katajisto (FIN); W 3-0	—N/a	1 Q	Sim (KOR); L 4-6	—N/a	5th place match Wang H (CHN); W 6-0	5
Rifat Yildiz	58kg	Nikonorov (RUS); W 4-1	Barguaoui (TUN); W 4-0	Borăscu (ROU); W 6-4	1 Q	Bye	Nazaryan (BUL); L 0-10	Sheng Z (CHN); L 0-2	4
Adam Juretzko	69kg	Son (KOR); L 0-12	Schoberg (SWE); W 2-0	—N/a	2	did not advance			
Thomas Zander	85kg	Yerlikaya (TUR); L 1-5	Asell (FIN); W 3-1	—N/a	2	did not advance			

== Notes ==
- International Olympic Committee Web Site
- International Olympic Committee (2001) The Results Retrieved 12 November 2005.
- Official Report of the XXVII Olympiad Volume 1: Preparing for the Games Sydney Organising Committee for the Olympic Games (2001). Retrieved 20 November 2005.
- Official Report of the XXVII Olympiad Volume 2: Celebrating the Games. Sydney Organising Committee for the Olympic Games (2001). Retrieved 20 November 2005.
- Olympia-Statistik
- The Results. Sydney Organising Committee for the Olympic Games (2001). Retrieved 20 November 2005.
- Wallechinsky, David (2004). The Complete Book of the Summer Olympics (Athens 2004 Edition). Toronto, Canada. ISBN 1-894963-32-6.
