= Equestrian at the 2000 Summer Olympics – Individual eventing =

Individual eventing at the Games of the XXVII Olympiad
- Venue: Sydney International Equestrian Centre
- Date: 20–22 September 2000
- Competitors: 38 from 21 nations
- Winning time: -34.00

Medalists
1st place, gold medalist(s)		David O'Connor	United States
2nd place, silver medalist(s)		Andrew Hoy	Australia
3rd place, bronze medalist(s)		Mark Todd	New Zealand

The individual eventing event, part of the equestrian program at the 2000 Summer Olympics, was held from 20–22 September 2000 in the Sydney International Equestrian Centre. Like all other equestrian events, the eventing competition was mixed gender, with both male and female athletes competing in the same division.

For the 1996 and 2000 Olympic competitions, the individual and team contests were separate events. A rider could compete in both competitions as long as it was on different horses. An example of this is individual winner David O'Connor who won his gold medal riding Custom Made, while he earned his team bronze medal with the U.S riding Giltedge.

== Results ==
The total score for each horse and rider was the sum of the total penalty points earned in the various phases of competitions. The pair with the lowest number of penalty points was victorious.

=== Dressage ===
For the dressage portion of the competition, horse and rider pairs performed series of movements that were evaluated by judges. Judges gave marks of 0 to 10 for each movement, subtracting points for errors. The score for each judge was represented the total marks gained. For every point less than a total of 240, 0.2 Penalty Points were assessed.

Rank	Rider	Horse	Nation	Judge H	Judge C	Judge M	Score	Penalty Points
1	David O'Connor	Custom Made	United States	194	187	194	575	29.0
2	Marina Köhncke	Longchamps	Germany	174	194	178	546	34.8
3	Heidi Antikatzides	Michaelmas	Greece	181	176	176	533	37.4
4	Mark Todd	Eyespy II	New Zealand	181	170	174	525	39.0
5	Andrew Hoy	Swizzle In	Australia	158	180	183	521	39.8
5	Sofia Andler	Amaretto	Sweden	171	165	185	521	39.8
7	Blyth Tait	Welton Envoy	New Zealand	157	175	184	516	40.8
8	Rodolphe Scherer	Bambi De Brier	France	167	171	175	513	41.4
9	Robert Costello	Chevalier	United States	176	161	171	508	42.4
10	Fabio Magni	Cool N' Breezy	Italy	167	171	162	500	44.0
11	Amanda Ross	Otto Schumaker	Australia	167	159	170	496	44.8
12	Annette Wyrwoll	Bantry Bay	Germany	168	163	164	495	45.0
13	Mary King	Star Appeal	Great Britain	153	164	168	485	47.0
14	Nils Haagensen	Discovery II	Denmark	152	166	166	484	47.2
15	Brook Staples	Master Monarch	Australia	159	158	165	482	47.6
16	Daisuke Kato	Akwaba	Japan	152	169	159	480	48.0
17	Enrique Sarasola Jr.	Cool Boy	Spain	150	159	161	470	50.0
18	Karen Dixon	Too Smart	Great Britain	149	160	159	468	50.4
19	Nicolas Touzaint	Cobra D'Or	France	156	149	162	467	50.6
20	Ian Stark	Arakai	Great Britain	157	158	150	465	51.0
21	Mary Jane Tumbridge	Bermuda's Gold	Bermuda	154	152	151	457	52.6
T22	Piia Pantsu	Uppercut	Finland	144	160	152	456	52.8
T22	Julie Black	Hyde Park Corn	United States	154	148	154	456	52.8
T22	Austin O'Connor	Fabio	Ireland	157	152	147	456	52.8
25	Kai Rueder	Butscher	Germany	148	157	150	455	53.0
26	Bruno Goyens de Heusch	Graceland Cava	Belgium	146	153	155	454	53.2
T27	Eduard Stibbe	Eton	Netherlands Antilles	149	154	148	451	53.8
T27	Andrea Verdina	Donnizeti	Italy	152	127	152	451	53.8
29	Jean-Lou Bigot	Twist La Beige	France	141	147	150	438	56.4
30	Wyndham St John	Oliver	Canada	130	147	145	422	59.6
31	Paula Toernqvist	Monaghan	Sweden	135	148	144	427	60.6
32	Imtiaz Anees	Spring Invader	India	133	143	139	415	61.0
33	Bruce Mandeville	Larissa	Canada	134	125	147	406	62.8
34	Trevor Smith	High Scope	Ireland	129	136	140	405	65.0
35	Jorge Fernandez	Tiberio	Uruguay	114	118	118	350	74.0
36	Carlos Paro	Feline	Brazil	100	102	110	312	81.6
37	Henry Gramajo	Potencial	Uruguay	101	105	109	315	83.0
38	Roberto Macedo	Fricote	Brazil	76	84	94	254	93.2

=== Cross country ===
In the cross country phase, each pair had to traverse 14.3 kilometers of road and track, 3.1 kilometers of steeplechase, and an obstacle course spread over a track of approximately 7.4 kilometers. Pairs received .4 penalty points for every second beyond the optimal time, up to a limit. Any pair that had not finished in that time was eliminated.

Penalty points were also assessed for disobedience faults at obstacles and for falls. Disobedience faults incurred 20 penalty points, rider falls incurred 65, and horse falls eliminated the pair. The total penalty points from cross country were added to those incurred in phase 1, dressage, for a two-round total.

Rank	Rider	Horse	Nation	Faults	Time	Penalty Points
1	David O'Connor	Custom Made	United States	0	0	0
1	Heidi Antikatzides	Michaelmas	Greece	0	0	0
1	Mark Todd	Eyespy II	New Zealand	0	0	0
1	Andrew Hoy	Swizzle In	Australia	0	0	0
1	Rodolphe Scherer	Bambi De Brier	France	0	0	0
1	Robert Costello	Chevalier	United States	0	0	0
1	Fabio Magni	Cool N' Breezy	Italy	0	0	0
1	Mary King	Star Appeal	Great Britain	0	0	0
1	Karen Dixon	Too Smart	Great Britain	0	0	0
1	Ian Stark	Arakai	Great Britain	0	0	0
1	Jean-Lou Bigot	Twist La Beige	France	0	0	0
12	Julie Black	Hyde Park Corn	United States	0	0.8	0.8
13	Enrique Sarasola Jr.	Cool Boy	Spain	0	1.6	1.6
14	Paula Toernqvist	Monaghan	Sweden	0	2.8	2.8
15	Eduard Stibbe	Eton	Netherlands Antilles	0	4.8	4.8
16	Wyndham St John	Oliver	Canada	0	2.8	2.8
17	Carlos Paro	Feline	Brazil	0	19.2	19.2
18	Andrea Verdina	Donnizeti	Italy	20	0	20
19	Trevor Smith	High Scope	Ireland	0	36.8	36.8
20	Brook Staples	Master Monarch	Australia	20	18.8	38.8
21	Austin O'Connor	Fabio	Ireland	20	19.2	39.2
22	Annette Wyrwoll	Bantry Bay	Germany	40	32.8	72.8
23	Amanda Ross	Otto Schumaker	Australia	60	27.2	87.2
24	Bruce Mandeville	Larissa	Canada	60	72.8	132.8
25	Imtiaz Anees	Spring Invader	India	120	45.6	165.6
-	Marina Köhncke	Longchamps	Germany	0	0.8	EL
-	Jorge Fernandez	Tiberio	Uruguay	80	8	EL
-	Henry Gramajo	Potencial	Uruguay	0	10.4	EL
-	Bruno Goyens de Heusch	Graceland Cava	Belgium	60	0	RT
-	Sofia Andler	Amaretto	Sweden	60	0	RT
-	Kai Rueder	Butscher	Germany	40	0	RT
-	Nils Haagensen	Discovery II	Denmark	100	0	RT
-	Roberto Macedo	Fricote	Brazil	80	0	RT
-	Mary Jane Tumbridge	Bermuda's Gold	Bermuda	0	0	RT
-	Blyth Tait	Welton Envoy	New Zealand	20	0	RT
-	Nicolas Touzaint	Cobra D'Or	France	80	0	RT
-	Daisuke Kato	Akwaba	Japan	0	0	RT
-	Piia Pantsu	Uppercut	Finland	80	0	RT

==== Total after Dressage and Cross Country ====
Rank	Rider	Horse	Nation	Dressage	Cross Country	Total Penalty Points
1	David O'Connor	Custom Made	United States	29.0	0	29.0
2	Heidi Antikatzides	Michaelmas	Greece	37.4	0	37.4
3	Mark Todd	Eyespy II	New Zealand	39.0	0	39.0
4	Andrew Hoy	Swizzle In	Australia	39.8	0	39.8
5	Rodolphe Scherer	Bambi De Brier	France	41.4	0	41.4
6	Robert Costello	Chevalier	United States	42.4	0	42.4
7	Fabio Magni	Cool N' Breezy	Italy	44.0	0	44.0
8	Mary King	Star Appeal	Great Britain	47.0	0	47.0
9	Karen Dixon	Too Smart	Great Britain	50.4	0	50.4
10	Ian Stark	Arakai	Great Britain	51.0	0	51.0
11	Enrique Sarasola Jr.	Cool Boy	Spain	50.0	0	51.6
12	Julie Black	Hyde Park Corn	United States	52.8	0.8	53.6
13	Jean-Lou Bigot	Twist La Beige	France	56.4	0	56.4
14	Eduard Stibbe	Eton	Netherlands Antilles	53.8	4.8	58.6
15	Paula Toernqvist	Monaghan	Sweden	60.6	2.8	63.4
16	Andrea Verdina	Donnizeti	Italy	53.8	20	73.8
17	Wyndham St John	Oliver	Canada	59.6	18.8	78.4
18	Brook Staples	Master Monarch	Australia	47.6	38.8	86.4
19	Austin O'Connor	Fabio	Ireland	52.8	39.2	92.0
20	Carlos Paro	Feline	Brazil	81.6	19.2	100.8
21	Trevor Smith	High Scope	Ireland	65,0	36.8	101.8
22	Annette Wyrwoll	Bantry Bay	Germany	45.0	72.8	117.8
23	Amanda Ross	Otto Schumaker	Australia	44.8	87.2	132.0
24	Bruce Mandeville	Larissa	Canada	62.8	132.8	195.6
25	Imtiaz Anees	Spring Invader	India	61.0	165.6	226.6
-	Marina Köhncke	Longchamps	Germany	34.8		EL
-	Jorge Fernandez	Tiberio	Uruguay	74.0		EL
-	Henry Gramajo	Potencial	Uruguay	83.0		EL
-	Bruno Goyens de Heusch	Graceland Cava	Belgium	53.2		RT
-	Sofia Andler	Amaretto	Sweden	39.8		RT
-	Kai Rueder	Butscher	Germany	53.0		RT
-	Nils Haagensen	Discovery II	Denmark	47.2		RT
-	Roberto Macedo	Fricote	Brazil	93.2		RT
-	Mary Jane Tumbridge	Bermuda's Gold	Bermuda	56.2		RT
-	Blyth Tait	Welton Envoy	New Zealand	40.8		RT
-	Nicolas Touzaint	Cobra D'Or	France	50.6		RT
-	Daisuke Kato	Akwaba	Japan	48.0		RT
-	Piia Pantsu	Uppercut	Finland	52.8		RT

=== Show jumping ===
In show jumping, pairs received 4 penalty points for each obstacle knocked down, 4 penalty points for the horse's first disobedience, and 8 penalty points for the rider's first fall. They also received 1 penalty point for each second over the optimum time.

They could be eliminated for a second disobedience, the rider's second fall, the horse's first fall, or taking more than twice the optimum time to finish the course.

Rank	Rider	Horse	Nation	Faults	Time	Penalty Points
1	Andrew Hoy	Swizzle In	Australia	0	0	0
1	Julie Black	Hyde Park Corn	United States	0	0	0
1	Trevor Smith	High Scope	Ireland	0	0	0
1	Annette Wyrwoll	Bantry Bay	Germany	0	0	0
1	Bruce Mandeville	Larissa	Canada	0	0	0
6	Mark Todd	Eyespy II	New Zealand	0	3.0	3.0
7	David O'Connor	Custom Made	United States	5.0	0	5.0
7	Rodolphe Scherer	Bambi De Brier	France	5.0	0	5.0
7	Fabio Magni	Cool N' Breezy	Italy	5.0	0	5.0
7	Mary King	Star Appeal	Great Britain	5.0	0	5.0
7	Ian Stark	Arakai	Great Britain	5.0	0	5.0
7	Austin O'Connor	Fabio	Ireland	5.0	0	5.0
13	Robert Costello	Chevalier	United States	10.0	0	10.0
13	Karen Dixon	Too Smart	Great Britain	10.0	0	10.0
13	Jean-Lou Bigot	Twist La Beige	France	10.0	0	10.0
13	Brook Staples	Master Monarch	Australia	10.0	0	10.0
13	Amanda Ross	Otto Schumaker	Australia	10.0	0	10.0
13	Imtiaz Anees	Spring Invader	India	10.0	0	10.0
19	Paula Toernqvist	Monaghan	Sweden	5.0	6.0	11.0
20	Heidi Antikatzides	Michaelmas	Greece	10.0	3.0	13.0
20	Eduard Stibbe	Eton	Netherlands Antilles	10.0	3.0	13.0
22	Andrea Verdina	Donnizeti	Italy	5.0	9.0	14.0
23	Carlos Paro	Feline	Brazil	45.0	2.0	47.0
-	Enrique Sarasola Jr.	Cool Boy	Spain			EL
-	Wyndham St John	Oliver	Canada			WD
-	Marina Köhncke	Longchamps	Germany			NS
-	Jorge Fernandez	Tiberio	Uruguay			NS
-	Henry Gramajo	Potencial	Uruguay			NS
-	Bruno Goyens de Heusch	Graceland Cava	Belgium			NS
-	Sofia Andler	Amaretto	Sweden			NS
-	Kai Rueder	Butscher	Germany			NS
-	Nils Haagensen	Discovery II	Denmark			NS
-	Roberto Macedo	Fricote	Brazil			NS
-	Mary Jane Tumbridge	Bermuda's Gold	Bermuda			NS
-	Blyth Tait	Welton Envoy	New Zealand			NS
-	Nicolas Touzaint	Cobra D'Or	France			NS
-	Daisuke Kato	Akwaba	Japan			NS
-	Piia Pantsu	Uppercut	Finland			NS

=== Final Total ===
Rank	Rider	Horse	Nation	Dressage	Cross Country	Jumping	Total Penalty Points
1st place, gold medalist(s)	David O'Connor	Custom Made	United States	29.0	0	5.0	34.0
2nd place, silver medalist(s)	Andrew Hoy	Swizzle In	Australia	39.8	0	0	39.8
3rd place, bronze medalist(s)	Mark Todd	Eyespy II	New Zealand	39.0	0	3.0	42.0
4	Rodolphe Scherer	Bambi De Brier	France	41.4	0	5.0	46.4
5	Fabio Magni	Cool N' Breezy	Italy	44.0	0	5.0	49.0
6	Heidi Antikatzides	Michaelmas	Greece	37.4	0	13.0	50.4
7	Mary King	Star Appeal	Great Britain	47.0	0	5.0	52.0
8	Robert Costello	Chevalier	United States	42.4	0	10.0	52.4
9	Julie Black	Hyde Park Corn	United States	52.8	0.8	0	53.6
10	Ian Stark	Arakai	Great Britain	51.0	0	5.0	56.0
11	Karen Dixon	Too Smart	Great Britain	50.4	0	10.0	60.4
12	Jean-Lou Bigot	Twist La Beige	France	54.6	0	10.0	64.6
13	Eduard Stibbe	Eton	Netherlands Antilles	53.8	4.80	13.0	71.6
14	Paula Toernqvist	Monaghan	Sweden	60.6	2.8	11.0	74.4
15	Andrea Verdina	Donnizeti	Italy	53.8	20.0	14.0	87.8
16	Brook Staples	Master Monarch	Australia	47.6	20.0	10.0	96.4
17	Austin O'Connor	Fabio	Ireland	52.8	20.0	5.0	97.0
18	Trevor Smith	High Scope	Ireland	65.0	36.8	0	101.8
19	Annette Wyrwoll	Bantry Bay	Germany	45.0	72.8	0	117.8
20	Amanda Ross	Otto Schumaker	Australia	44.8	87.2	10.0	142.0
21	Carlos Paro	Feline	Brazil	81.6	19.2	47.0	147.8
22	Bruce Mandeville	Larissa	Canada	62.8	132.8	0	195.6
23	Imtiaz Anees	Spring Invader	India	61.0	165.2	10.0	236.6
-	Enrique Sarasola Jr.	Cool Boy	Spain	50.0	1.6		EL
-	Wyndham St John	Oliver	Canada	59.6	18.8		WD
-	Marina Köhncke	Longchamps	Germany	34.8			EL
-	Jorge Fernandez	Tiberio	Uruguay	74.0			EL
-	Henry Gramajo	Potencial	Uruguay	83.0			EL
-	Bruno Goyens de Heusch	Graceland Cava	Belgium	53.2			RT
-	Sofia Andler	Amaretto	Sweden	39.8			RT
-	Kai Rueder	Butscher	Germany	53.0			RT
-	Nils Haagensen	Discovery II	Denmark	47.2			RT
-	Roberto Macedo	Fricote	Brazil	93.2			RT
-	Mary Jane Tumbridge	Bermuda's Gold	Bermuda	56.2			RT
-	Blyth Tait	Welton Envoy	New Zealand	40.8			RT
-	Nicolas Touzaint	Cobra D'Or	France	50.6			RT
-	Daisuke Kato	Akwaba	Japan	48.0			RT
-	Piia Pantsu	Uppercut	Finland	52.8			RT

== Sources ==
- Official Report of the 2000 Sydney Summer Olympics available at https://web.archive.org/web/20060622162855/http://www.la84foundation.org/5va/reports_frmst.htm
