= Uruguay at the 2000 Summer Olympics =

- IOC code: URU
- NOC: Uruguayan Olympic Committee
- Website: www.cou.org.uy (in Spanish)

in Sydney
- Competitors: 14 in 7 sports
- Flag bearer: Mónica Falcioni
- Medals Ranked 64th: Gold 0 Silver 1 Bronze 0 Total 1

Summer Olympics appearances (overview)
- 1924; 1928; 1932; 1936; 1948; 1952; 1956; 1960; 1964; 1968; 1972; 1976; 1980; 1984; 1988; 1992; 1996; 2000; 2004; 2008; 2012; 2016; 2020; 2024; 2028

Uruguay was represented at the 2000 Summer Olympics in Sydney, New South Wales, Australia by the Uruguayan Olympic Committee.

In total, 14 athletes including 11 men and three women represented Uruguay in seven different sports including athletics, cycling, equestrian, judo, sailing, shooting and swimming.

Uruguay won one medal at the games after Milton Wynants claimed silver in the men's points race.

== Competitors ==
In total, 14 athletes represented Uruguay at the 2000 Summer Olympics in Sydney, New South Wales, Australia across seven different sports.

Sport	Men	Women	Total
Athletics	2	2	4
Cycling	2	0	2
Equestrian	2	0	2
Judo	1	0	1
Sailing	1	0	1
Shooting	1	0	1
Swimming	3	1	4
Total	11	3	14

== Medalists ==
Uruguay won one medal at the games after Milton Wynants claimed silver in the track cycling men's points race.

Medal	Name	Sport	Event
Silver	Milton Wynants	Cycling	Men's points race

== Athletics ==
In total, four Uruguayan athletes participated in the athletics events – Monica Falcioni in the women's long jump, Nestor García in the men's marathon, Déborah Gyurcsek in the women's pole vault and Heber Viera in the men's 100 m and the men's 200 m.

Key

- Note–Ranks given for track events are within the athlete's heat only
- Q = Qualified for the next round by position in race or, in field events, by achieving the automatic qualification target
- q = Qualified for the next round as a fastest loser or, in field events, by position without achieving the qualifying target

Track and road events

Athlete	Event	Heat		Quarterfinal		Semifinal		Final	
Athlete	Event	Time	Rank	Time	Rank	Time	Rank	Time	Rank
Heber Viera	Men's 100 m	10.54	4	Did not advance					
Heber Viera	Men's 200 m	20.82	4 q	20.97	8	Did not advance			
Nestor García	Men's marathon	—N/a						2:22:30	46

Field events

Athlete	Event	Qualification		Final	
Athlete	Event	Result	Rank	Result	Rank
Monica Falcioni	Women's long jump	6.05	18	Did not advance	
Déborah Gyurcsek	Women's pole vault	4.15	21	Did not advance	

== Cycling ==
In total, two Uruguayan athletes participated in the cycling events – Gregorio Bare in the men's road race and Milton Wynants in the men's points race.

=== Road ===
Athlete	Event	Time	Rank
Gregorio Bare	Men's road race	DNF	

=== Track ===
Athlete	Event	Points	Rank
Milton Wynants	Men's points race	18	2nd place, silver medalist(s)

== Equestrian ==
In total, two Uruguayan athletes participated in the equestrian events – Jorge Fernández and Henry Gramajo in the eventing individual.

Athlete	Horse	Event	Dressage		Cross-country		Show jumping		Total	
Athlete	Horse	Event	Penalties	Rank	Penalties	Rank	Penalties	Rank	Penalties	Rank
Jorge Fernández	Tiberio	Eventing individual	74.0	35	Eliminated					
Henry Gramajo	Potencial	Eventing individual	83.0	37	Eliminated					

== Judo ==
In total, one Uruguayan athlete participated in the judo events – Alvaro Paseyro in the men's –81 kg.

Athlete	Event	First round	Round of 32	Round of 16	Quarterfinal	Semifinal	Repechage 1	Repechage 2	Repechage 3	Repechage 4	Final / BM	
Athlete	Event	Opposition Result	Opposition Result	Opposition Result	Opposition Result	Opposition Result	Opposition Result	Opposition Result	Opposition Result	Opposition Result	Opposition Result	Rank
Alvaro Paseyro	–81 kg	Bye	Turayev (UZB); W 1010–0000	Ochirbat (MGL); W 1001–0000	Takimoto (JPN); L 0001–0001	Did not advance	Bye		Seilkhanov (KAZ); W 1001–0001	Kwak (PRK); W 1000–0001	Delgado (POR); L 0000–1011	5

== Sailing ==
In total, one Uruguayan athlete participated in the sailing events – Adolfo Carrau in the laser.

Athlete	Event	Race											Net points	Rank
Athlete	Event	1	2	3	4	5	6	7	8	9	10	11	Net points	Rank
Adolfo Carrau	Laser	20	~~35~~	29	25	27	27	~~33~~	27	21	29	25	230	30

== Shooting ==
In total, one Uruguayan athlete participated in the shooting events – Luis Méndez in the men's 10 m air pistol.

Athlete	Event	Qualification		Final		Total	
Athlete	Event	Points	Rank	Points	Rank	Points	Rank
Luis Méndez	10 m air pistol	556	41	Did not advance			

== Swimming ==
In total, four Uruguayan athletes participated in the swimming events – Serrana Fernández in the women's 100 m backstroke, Diego Gallo in the men's 100 m backstroke, Paul Kutscher in the men's 50 m freestyle and the men's 100 m freestyle and Francisco Picasso in the men's 200 m individual medley.

Athlete	Event	Heat		Semifinal		Final	
Athlete	Event	Time	Rank	Time	Rank	Time	Rank
Paul Kutscher	Men's 50 m freestyle	23.90	48	Did not advance			
Paul Kutscher	Men's 100 m freestyle	52.22	46	Did not advance			
Diego Gallo	Men's 100 m backstroke	58.18	41	Did not advance			
Francisco Picasso	Men's 200 m individual medley	02:10.97	52	Did not advance			
Serrana Fernández	Women's 100 m backstroke	01:06.57	38	Did not advance			

== See also ==
- Uruguay at the 1999 Pan American Games
