= Amanda Ross =

Amanda Ross may refer to:

- Amanda Ross (television executive), British television executive
- Amanda Ross (equestrian) (born 1973), Australian three-day eventing equestrian
- Amanda McKittrick Ros, pen-name of Anna Margaret Ross (1860–1939), Irish writer
- Amanda Ross-Ho (born 1975) American artist
