= Pantsu =

Pantsu may refer to:

- Romaji for Underpants
- a Finnish surname
  - Piia Pantsu - a Finnish equestrian rider
