= Wyndham St. John =

Canadian equestrian (1959–2023)

Personal information
- Nationality: Canadian
- Born: 30 May 1959 Vancouver, British Columbia, Canada
- Died: 6 March 2023 (aged 63) Andalucia, Spain

Sport
- Sport: Equestrian

Wyndham St. John (30 May 1959 – 6 March 2023) was a Canadian equestrian. She competed in the individual eventing at the 2000 Summer Olympics.

St. John died in Andalucia, Spain on 6 March 2023, at the age of 63.
