= Brook Staples =

Australian equestrian (born 1966)

Personal information
- Nationality: Australian
- Born: 23 June 1966 (age 58); Kandos, New South Wales, Australia

Sport
- Sport: Equestrian

Brook Staples (born 23 June 1966) is an Australian equestrian. He placed 18th in individual eventing at the 2000 Summer Olympics. In England, he won the EHOA Martin Collins British Novice Championship and the 2008 Dodson & Horrell Novice Championship. In 2003, he helped steal a horse he had ridden, Master Monarch, from Andrew Hoy.
