= Tiberi =

Tiberi is a patronymic surname of Italian origin from the personal name Tiberio. Notable people with this surname include:

- Andrea Tiberi (born 1985), Italian mountain bike racer
- Antonio Tiberi (born 2001), Italian road cyclist
- Damien Tibéri (born 1985), French professional football player
- Frank Tiberi (born 1928), American bandleader
- Jean Tiberi (1935–2025), French politician, mayor of Paris
- Pat Tiberi (born 1962), American politician, former U.S. representative
- Thomas Tiberi (1919–1995), American politician
- Xavière Tiberi (born 1936), spouse of Jean Tiberi
