= Equestrian events at the 2003 Pan American Games =

- Venues: Palmarejo Equestrian Center

Equestrian competitions at the 2003 Pan American Games in Santo Domingo, Dominican Republic, were held in 2003 at the Palmarejo Equestrian Center (dressage and jumping). The venue seated 600 people and was 65 km from the athlete's village. Eventing competition were held separately as a Pan American Eventing Championship in Fair Hill, United States and were officially not included in the results.

== Medal summary ==
=== Medal table ===
* Host nation (Dominican Republic)

Rank	Nation	Gold	Silver	Bronze	Total
1	United States	4	2	1	7
2	Canada	1	2	1	4
3	Puerto Rico	1	0	0	1
4	Mexico	0	2	1	3
5	Brazil	0	0	2	2
6	Dominican Republic*	0	0	1	1
Totals (6 entries)		6	6	6	18

=== Events ===
Event	Gold	Silver	Bronze
Individual dressage	Leslie Reid; Canada	Bernadette Pujals; Mexico	Yvonne Losos de Muñiz; Dominican Republic
Team dressage	United States; Jan Ebeling; Pierre St.Jacques; Carol Lavell; Kristina Harrison-Naness	Canada; Leslie Reid; Ashley Holzer; Evi Strasser; Jacqueline Brooks	Mexico; Bernadette Pujals; Antonio Rivera; Omar Zayrik; Joaquín Orth
Individual jumping	Mark Watring; Puerto Rico	Chris Kappler; United States	Margie Goldstein-Engle; United States
Team jumping	United States; Margie Goldstein-Engle; Lauren Hough; Chris Kappler; Beezie Madden	Mexico; Gerardo Tazzer; Federico Fernández; Antonio Chedraui; Santiago Lambre	Brazil; Bernardo Alves; Karina Johannpeter; Olivier Metodo; César Almeida

=== Events in Fair Hill, USA ===
Event	Gold	Silver	Bronze
Individual eventing	Darren Chiacchia; United States	Karen O'Connor; United States	Jan Thompson; United States
Team eventing	United States; Jan Thompson; Stephen Bradley; Will Faudree; Robert Costello	Canada; Mike Winter; Bruce Mandeville; Hawley Bennett; Penny Rowland	Brazil; Raul de Senna; Guto de Faria; Lourenço Vieira da Silva; Rafael Gouveira Júnior

== See also ==
- Equestrian events at the 2004 Summer Olympics
