= Sofia Andler =

Swedish equestrian

Personal information
- Nationality: Swedish
- Born: 6 September 1974 (age 50); Trelleborg, Sweden

Sport
- Sport: Equestrian

Sofia Elisabeth Andler-Kvarnstrand (born 6 September 1974) is a Swedish former equestrian. She competed in the individual eventing at the 2000 Summer Olympics.
