= Roberto de Macedo =

Brazilian equestrian

Personal information
- Born: 15 March 1980 (age 45); Araraquara, Brazil

Sport
- Sport: Equestrian

Roberto de Macedo (born 15 March 1980) is a Brazilian equestrian. He competed in the individual eventing at the 2000 Summer Olympics.
