= Imtiaz Anees =

Indian equestrian

Personal information
- Nationality: Indian
- Born: 25 December 1970 (age 55)
- Education: Lawrence School Sanawar, Bachelors Sydenham College of Commerce and Economics, Equine Degree Marcus Oldham College

Sport
- Sport: Equestrian

Imtiaz Anees (born 25 December 1970) is an Indian equestrian. He competed in the individual eventing at the 2000 Summer Olympics in Sydney and finished 23rd overall.First Indian Civilian to represent India at the Olympics. First Indian to represent India athe Equestrian World Championships, Bronze Medallist at the Asian Games. Owner and trainer of Seahorse Equestrian Training Academy in India
