= Diego Gallo =

Uruguayan swimmer

Personal information
- Born: June 28, 1982 (age 44)

Sport
- Sport: Swimming

Diego Gallo González (born June 28, 1982) is a backstroke swimmer from Uruguay, who competed at the 2000 Summer Olympics for his native country.

At the 2000 Olympics, he set the Uruguay Record in the 100 backstroke at 58.18.
