= Jeannette Götte =

German footballer (born 1979)

Personal information
- Full name: Jeannette Götte
- Date of birth: 13 March 1979 (age 47)
- Place of birth: Hagen, West Germany
- Height: 1.68 m (5 ft 6 in)
- Position: Midfielder

Senior career*
Years	Team	Apps	(Gls)
–1996	SV Westfalia Hagen		
1996–1999	Rot-Weiß Hillen		
1999–2001	FFC Flaesheim-Hillen		
2001–2003	FCR 2001 Duisburg		
2003–2009	SG Wattenscheid 09		
2011–2014	1. FFC Recklinghausen		

International career
2000–2001	Germany	8	(0)
- * Club domestic league appearances and goals

Jeannette Götte (born 13 March 1979) is a German former football midfielder. She was part of the Germany women's national football team at the 2000 Summer Olympics.

== See also ==
- Germany at the 2000 Summer Olympics
