= Bruno Goyens de Heusch =

Belgian equestrian

Personal information
- Nationality: Belgian
- Born: 15 March 1959 (age 66); Ixelles, Belgium

Sport
- Sport: Equestrian

Bruno Goyens de Heusch (born 15 March 1959) is a Belgian equestrian. He competed in the individual eventing at the 2000 Summer Olympics.
