= Kristina Harrison-Naness =

American equestrian

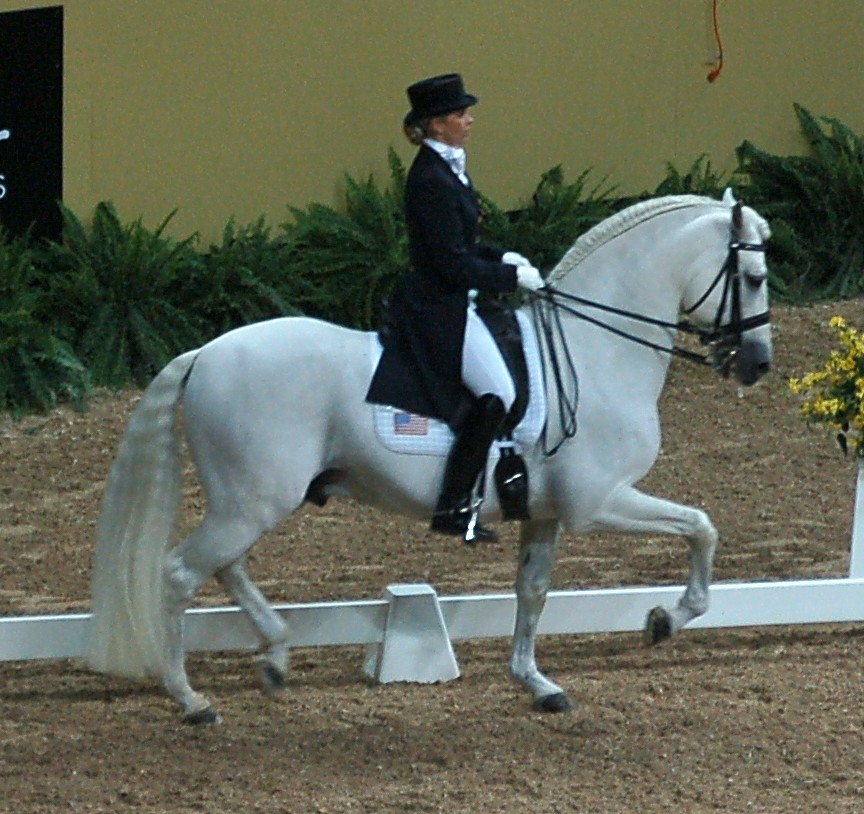

Personal information
- Full name: Kristina Harrison-Naness
Medal record
Equestrian
Representing the United States
Pan American Games
Gold medal – first place	2003 Santo Domingo	Team dressage

Kristina Harrison-Naness is an American equestrian. She won a gold medal at the 2003 Pan American Games, in team dressage.

She competed at the 2007 National Grand Prix, 2007 FEI World Cup, 2007 CDI Oldenburg, and 2008 Open Grand Prix Special, with Rociero XV.
