= Trevor Smith (equestrian) =

Irish equestrian

Personal information
- Nationality: Irish
- Born: 20 December 1959 (age 65); Tandragee, Northern Ireland

Sport
- Sport: Equestrian

Trevor Smith (born 20 December 1959) is an Irish equestrian. He competed in the individual eventing at the 2000 Summer Olympics.
