= Henry Gramajo =

Uruguayan equestrian

Personal information
- Nationality: Uruguayan
- Born: 19 September 1970 (age 54)

Sport
- Sport: Equestrian

Henry Gramajo (born 19 September 1970) is a Uruguayan equestrian. He competed in the individual eventing at the 2000 Summer Olympics.
