= Kai Rüder =

German equestrian

Personal information
- Nationality: German
- Born: 27 August 1971 (age 54) Fehmarn, West Germany

Sport
- Sport: Equestrian
Medal record
Equestrian
Representing Germany
European Championships
Gold medal – first place	2019 Luhmühlen	Team eventing

Kai Rüder (born 27 August 1971) is a German former equestrian. He competed in the individual eventing at the 2000 Summer Olympics.
