= Akwaba =

Official Theme Song For 2023 TotalEnergies African Cup of Nations

Single by Magic System featuring Yemi Alade, Mohamed Ramadan
- Language: French, English, Arabic
- Released: 13 October 2023
- Genre: African pop
- Length: 3:43
- Label: Universal Music Africa
- Songwriters: Magic System, Yemi Alade, Mohamed Ramadan
- Producer: Dany Synthé

"Akwaba" (Baoulé: "Welcome") is a song by Ivorian music quartet, Magic System which features Yemi Alade and Mohamed Ramadan. It was recorded and released as the official anthem of the 2023 TotalEnergies CAF African Cup of Nations which began 13 January 2024 and ended on 11 February 2024 in the West African country of Côte d'Ivoire.

== Production ==
The song was written by Magic System, Yemi Alade, Mohamed Ramadan and Fargyle Blax. It was produced by Dany Synthé and released by Universal Music Africa on 13 October 2023. The official video was directed by Tony Rodriguez and released on YouTube on 1 December 2023.
