= Jorge Fernández (equestrian) =

Uruguayan equestrian

Personal information
- Nationality: Uruguayan
- Born: 25 September 1968 (age 57)

Sport
- Sport: Equestrian
Medal record
Equestrian
Representing Uruguay
Pan American Games
| Bronze medal – third place | 1999 Winnipeg | Team eventing |

Jorge Fernández (born 25 September 1968) is a Uruguayan equestrian. He competed in the individual eventing at the 2000 Summer Olympics.
