= Annette Wyrwoll =

German equestrian

Personal information
- Nationality: German
- Born: 14 November 1955 (age 69); Neuwied, West Germany

Sport
- Sport: Equestrian

Annette Wyrwoll (born 14 November 1955) is a German former equestrian. She competed in the individual eventing at the 2000 Summer Olympics.
