= Amanda Ross (equestrian) =

Australian equestrian

Personal information
- Born: 23 December 1973 (age 52) Frankston, Victoria, Australia

Sport
- Country: Australia
- Sport: Equestrian
- Event: Eventing

Amanda Ross (born 23 December 1973 in Frankston, Victoria) is an Australian Olympic eventing rider. She competed at the Sydney 2000 Olympics in the individual event. Riding Otto Schumaker, she finished in 20th place with 149 points.

Ross continued to compete in three-day eventing and was shortlisted for the Summer Olympics in Tokyo with thoroughbred mare, Koko Popping Candy (a.k.a. Zarzy). Since 2021 she has changed her focus to showjumping, having sold on her eventing horses to young riders.
