= Stefan Meister =

German yacht racer

Stefan Meister (born 10 August 1970) is a German former yacht racer. He competed for his native Germany at the 2000 Summer Olympics. His partner was Frank Thieme.
