= Thomas Fichtner =

German sports shooter

Thomas Fichtner (born 30 December 1966) is a German sport shooter who competed in the 2000 Summer Olympics.
