= Frank Thieme =

German yacht racer (born 1963)

Frank Thieme (born 18 March 1963) is a German former yacht racer. He competed in the 2000 Summer Olympics with Stefan Meister.
