= Piia Pantsu =

Finnish equestrian

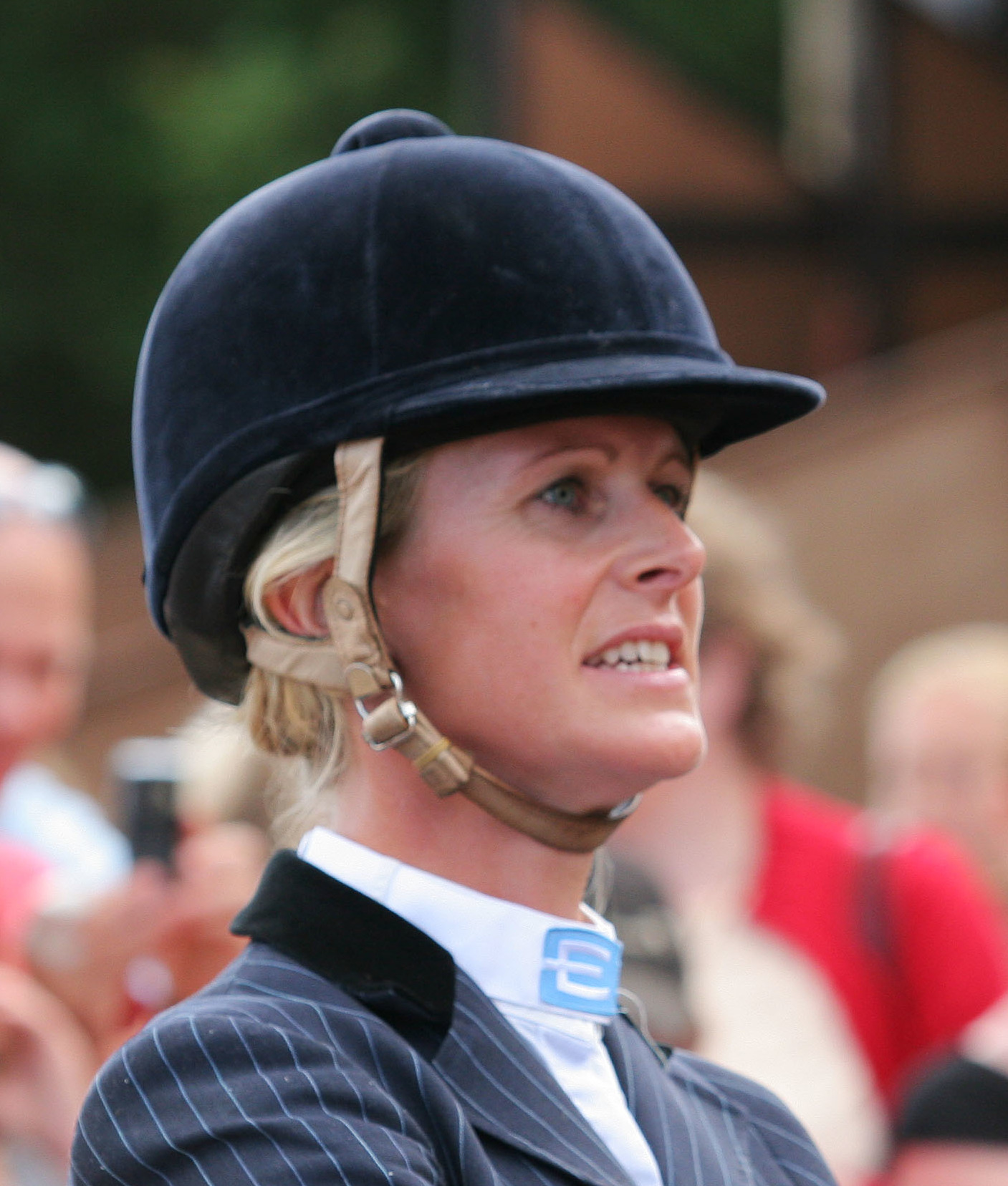

Medal record

Equestrian

Representing Finland

World Championships
Bronze medal – third place	2002 Jerez	Individual eventing

Piia Pantsu (born March 29, 1971, in Varkaus, Finland) is a Finnish equestrian rider. She competes in three-day eventing and in show jumping competitions. She is married to Fredrik Jönsson who was the son of her trainer, Jan Jönsson.

She competed in the individual eventing at the 2000 Summer Olympics. She would have also been at Athens but an injury to her horse prevented it.

== Horses ==
- Cyna (born 1983, died 2007)
- Ypäjä Karuso (born 1993)
- Ypäjä Uppercut (born 1989)
- Oazis (born 1996)
- Ypäjä Kolombia (born 1998)

== Achievements & Competitions ==
(eventing championships)

Competition	Place	Year	Horse	Rank
World Championship	The Hague	1994	Cyna	5.
European Championship	Rome	1995	Cyna	4.
European Championship	Burghley	1997	Cyna	stopped in second event
World Championship	Rooma	1998	Uppercut	9.
European Championship	Luhmühlen	1999	Uppercut	4.
Olympics	Sydney	2000	Uppercut	disqualification in second event
European Championship	Pau	2001	Ypäjä Karuso	17.
World Championship	Jerez	2002	Ypäjä Karuso	3.
Badminton Horse Trials	Gloucestershire, England	2003	Ypäjä Karuso	2.
European Championship	Blenheim	2005	Ypäjä Karuso	6.
World Cup Final	Malmö	2005	Ypäjä Karuso	3.
World Championship	Aachen	2006	Ypäjä Karuso	stopped in second event
Finland Championship	Kerava, Finland	2007	Ypäjä Karuso	1.
