= Fabio Magni =

Italian equestrian (born 1967)

Personal information
- Nationality: Italian
- Born: 12 March 1967 (age 59) Milan, Italy

Sport
- Sport: Equestrian
Medal record
Equestrian
Representing Italy
European Championships
Bronze medal – third place	2001 Pau	Team eventing
Bronze medal – third place	2007 Pratoni del Vivaro	Team eventing

Fabio Magni (born 12 March 1967) is an Italian equestrian. He competed at the 1992, 2000, 2004 and the 2008 Summer Olympics.
