= Heidi Antikatzidis =

Greek equestrian (born 1977)

Personal information
- Nationality: Greek
- Born: 4 March 1977 (age 48); Athens, Greece

Sport
- Sport: Equestrian

Heidi Antikatzidis (born 4 March 1977) is a Greek equestrian. She competed at the 2000 Summer Olympics and the 2004 Summer Olympics.
