= Tiberio =

Tiberio is an Italian given name from the Latin Tiberius, a derivative of the name of the river Tiber, as well as a surname. Notable people with the name include:

== Given name ==
- Tiberio Calcagni (1532–1565), Italian sculptor
- Tiberio Cavallo (1749–1809), Italian physicist and natural philosopher
- Tiberio Crispo (1498–1566), cardinal-nephew of Pope Paul III, bishop of Sessa Aurunca (1565–1566)
- Tiberio Cruz (born 1976), Colombian actor
- Tiberio Deciani (or Decianus) (1509–1582), Italian jurist working in the tradition of Renaissance humanism
- Tiberio Fiorilli, (1608–1694), Italian actor of commedia dell'arte known for developing the role of Scaramouche
- Tiberio Guarente (born 1985), Italian professional footballer
- César Tiberio Jiménez (born 1969), Mexican racing driver
- Tiberio Mitri (1926–2001), Italian boxer who fought from 1946 to 1957
- Tiberio Murgia (1929–2010), Italian film actor
- Tiberio d'Assisi (1470–1524), Italian painter of the Renaissance period
- Tiberio Tinelli (1586–1639), Italian painter of the early-Baroque period, active mainly in his native city of Venice
- Tiberio di Tito (1573–1627), Italian painter

== Surname ==
- Peter Tiberio (born 1989), American rugby union player
- Vincenzo Tiberio (1869–1915), researcher and medical officer in the Italian Navy, physician at the University of Naples

== See also ==
- Ponte di Tiberio (Rimini) or Bridge of Augustus, Roman bridge in Rimini, Italy
- Berio
- Tiber
- Tiberi, the patronymic form
