= Carmen Meininger =

German sport shooter

Carmen Meininger (born 11 March 1969) is a German sport shooter who competed in the 2000 Summer Olympics.
