= Adolfo Carrau =

Uruguayan sailor (born 1975)

Personal information
- Full name: Adolfo M. Carrau
- Nationality: Uruguayan
- Born: 10 June 1975 (age 49)
- Height: 185 cm (6 ft 1 in)
- Weight: 85 kg (187 lb)

Sport
- Sport: Sailing

Adolfo M. Carrau (born 10 June 1975) is a Uruguayan sailor. He competed in the Laser event at the 2000 Summer Olympics.
