= Andrea Verdina =

Italian equestrian

Personal information
- Nationality: Italian
- Born: 9 August 1969 (age 55); Novara, Italy

Sport
- Sport: Equestrian

Andrea Verdina (born 9 August 1969) is an Italian former equestrian. He competed in two events at the 2000 Summer Olympics.
