= Swen Schuller =

German sports shooter

Swen Schuller (born 9 May 1971 in Winnenden) is a German former sport shooter who competed in the 2000 Summer Olympics. He was the first to win the Ultimate sport shooter championship in history. He has much family living in the United States. Located in Orange County Ca.
