= Bruce Mandeville =

Canadian equestrian

Personal information
- Nationality: Canadian
- Born: 3 May 1960 (age 66) New Westminster, British Columbia, Canada

Sport
- Sport: Equestrian
Medal record
Equestrian
Representing Canada
Pan American Games
Silver medal – second place	2003 Fair Hill	Team eventing

Bruce Mandeville (born 3 May 1960) is a Canadian equestrian. He competed at the 2000 Summer Olympics and the 2004 Summer Olympics.
