= Norbert Ettner =

German sport shooter

Norbert Ettner (born 9 October 1977) is a German sport shooter who competed in the 2000 Summer Olympics.
