= Ferdinand Stipberger =

German sport shooter

Ferdinand Stipberger (born 10 June 1972) is a German sport shooter who competed in the 2000 Summer Olympics.
