= Nicole Brandebusemeyer =

German footballer

Personal information
- Date of birth: 9 October 1974 (age 52)
- Place of birth: Georgsmarienhütte, West Germany
- Height: 1.74 m (5 ft 8 1/2 in)
- Position: Defender

International career
| Years | Team | Apps | (Gls) |
| 1998–2000 | Germany | 8 | |
Medal record
Women's football
Representing Germany
Olympic Games
| Bronze medal – third place | 2000 Sydney | Team Competition |

Nicole Brandebusemeyer (born 9 October 1974 in Georgsmarienhütte, Lower Saxony) is a retired German football defender. She got 8 caps for the German national team between 1998 and 2000.

Brandebusemeyer played club football with FFC Brauweiler Pulheim in the Frauen-Bundesliga, and she helped the club reach the 2002–03 DFB-Pokal Frauen semi-finals.
