= Alexander Baronjan =

German yacht racer

Alexander Baronjan (born 22 March 1976) is a German former yacht racer who participated in the 2000 Summer Olympics. He competed in the Mistral One Design Class (Windsurfing) and finished in 9th place.
