= Marina Köhncke =

German equestrian

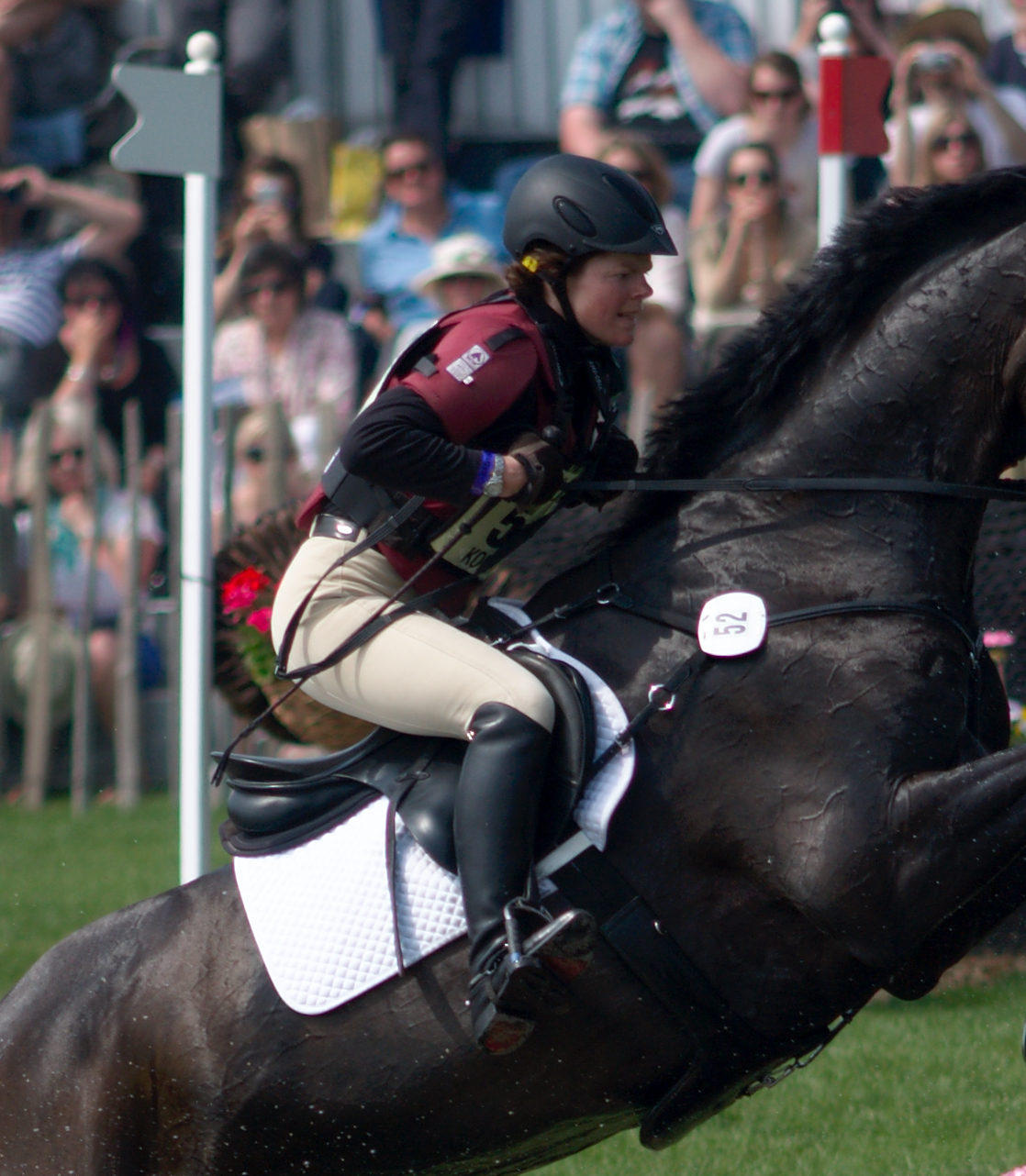
- Marina Kohncke and her horse Calma Schelly at the Lake during the cross-country phase of Badminton Horse Trials 2011.

Medal record

Equestrian

Representing Germany

World Championships
Bronze medal – third place	1990 Stockholm	Team eventing

German Championships
Bronze medal – third place	1992	Individual Eventing
Gold medal – first place	1993	Individual Eventing
Silver medal – second place	1998	Individual Eventing
Silver medal – second place	2000	Individual Eventing

Marina Köhncke (née Loheit, born March 8, 1968, in Hamburg-Wandsbek) is a German equestrian rider, who competes in Eventing competitions.

== Biography ==
Köhncke grew up in Radbruch in Northern Germany. At the age of nine she got her first pony. At the age of eleven she rode on her first horse show, three years later she starts in her first Eventing competition.

In 1985, now riding horses, she became Eventing champion of the German region Hanover/Bremen. After this victory she was nominated for her first international championship, the European Championship of Junior eventing riders. At the 1989 European eventing championship for young riders she won together with the German team the team gold medal.

In 1993 Marina Loheit was the second woman (after Simone Richter-Kals, today Simone Böckmann, in 1988) who won the German eventing championship. Also in this year she was part of the German team at European Eventing Championships in Achselschwang. After two years of living in Warendorf she moved to her husband in Badendorf. Now, after her marriage, she is called Marina Köhncke.

In the year 2000, after a second place in the German championship, she was nominated for the Olympic games in Sydney. Together with the team she finish on place four. From 2002 to 2007 she competes on eventing competitions up to CIC**- / CCI**-level. Since 2008 she competes with her horse Calma Schelly again on higher level. In 2010, she rode the Burghley Horse Trials, in April 2011 she started at the Badminton Horse Trials.

Marina Köhncke is a master horse farm manager ("Pferdewirtschaftsmeisterin"). As her trainer she called Martin Plewa and Horst Karsten.

== Successful horses ==
- current:
  - Calma Schelly (born 1999), dark brown Holsteiner mare, sire: Chambertin
- formerly:
  - Sir Toby (born 1989), gelding, sire: It's without doubt
  - TSF Böttcher's Longchamps (born 1987), brown Trakehner gelding, sire: Sir Shostakovich xx
  - Sundance Kid FRH (born 1981), brown Hanoverian gelding, sire: Smaragd
  - Arapaima (born 1980), mare

== Main results ==
- Summer Olympic Games:
  - 2000, Sydney:
    - with Sir Toby fourth in team ranking
    - with Longchamps not finished the individual competition (in 2000 team and individual ranking was two different competitions)
- World Equestrian Games:
  - 1990, Stockholm: with Sundance Kid third in team ranking and seventh in individual ranking
  - 1998, Rome: with Longchamps not finished the competition, also no team ranking for Germany
- European Eventing Championship:
  - 1985 (Juniors): with El Extranjero 13th in individual ranking
  - 1989 (Young riders): with Sundance Kid first in team ranking
  - 1993, Achselschwang: with Arapaima fourth in team ranking, 10th in individual ranking
- German Eventing Championship:
  - Individual:
    - 1992: with Sundance Kid third place
    - 1993: with Sundance Kid German champion
    - 1994: with Arapaima fourth place
    - 1995: with Sundance Kid fifth place
    - 1998: with Sir Toby second place
    - 2000: with Longchamps second place
  - Team championship:
    - 2009: with Calma Schelly German team champion with the team of Schleswig-Holstein
