= Cuba at the 2000 Summer Olympics =

- IOC code: CUB
- NOC: Cuban Olympic Committee

in Sydney, Australia 15 September – 1 October
- Competitors: 229 (147 men and 82 women) in 24 sports
- Flag bearer: Félix Savón
- Medals Ranked 9th: Gold 11 Silver 11 Bronze 7 Total 29

Summer Olympics appearances (overview)
- 1900; 1904; 1908–1920; 1924; 1928; 1932–1936; 1948; 1952; 1956; 1960; 1964; 1968; 1972; 1976; 1980; 1984–1988; 1992; 1996; 2000; 2004; 2008; 2012; 2016; 2020; 2024; 2028

Cuba competed at the 2000 Summer Olympics held in Australia's largest city, Sydney. 229 competitors, 147 men and 82 women, took part in 135 events in 24 sports.

== Medalists ==
Medal	Name	Sport	Event	Date
Gold	Anier García	Athletics	Men's 110 metres hurdles	25 September
Gold	Iván Pedroso	Athletics	Men's long jump	25 September
Gold	Guillermo Rigondeaux	Boxing	Bantamweight	30 September
Gold	Mario Kindelán	Boxing	Lightweight	30 September
Gold	Jorge Gutiérrez	Boxing	Middleweight	30 September
Gold	Félix Savón	Boxing	Heavyweight	30 September
Gold	Legna Verdecia	Judo	Women's 52 kg	17 September
Gold	Sibelis Veranes	Judo	Women's 70 kg	18 September
Gold	Ángel Matos	Taekwondo	Men's 80 kg	29 September
Gold	Cuba women's national volleyball team: Taismary Agüero; Zoila Barros; Regla Bell; Marlenis Costa; Ana Fernández; Mirka Francia; Idalmis Gato; Lilia Izquierdo; Mireya Luis; Yumilka Ruíz; Marta Sánchez; Regla Torres	Volleyball	Women's indoor competition	30 September
Gold	Filiberto Azcuy	Wrestling	Men's Greco-Roman 69 kg	27 September
Silver	Yoel García	Athletics	Men's triple jump	25 September
Silver	Javier Sotomayor	Athletics	Men's high jump	24 September
Silver	Cuba national baseball team: Omar Ajete; Yovany Aragón; Miguel Caldés Luis; Danel Castro; José Contreras; Yobal Dueñas; Yasser Gómez; José Ibar; Orestes Kindelán; Pedro Luis Lazo; Omar Linares; Oscar Macías; Juan Manrique; Javier Méndez; Rolando Meriño; Germán Mesa; Antonio Pacheco Massó; Ariel Pestano; Gabriel Pierre; Maels Rodríguez; Antonio Scull; Luis Ulacia; Lázaro Valle; Norge Luis Vera	Baseball (Men-only event)		27 September
Silver	Ledis Balceiro	Canoeing	Men's C-1 1000 m	30 September
Silver	Leobaldo Pereira, Ibrahim Rojas	Canoeing	Men's C-2 1000 m	30 September
Silver	Driulis González	Judo	Women's 57 kg	18 September
Silver	Daima Beltrán	Judo	Women's +78 kg	22 September
Silver	Urbia Meléndez	Taekwondo	Women's 49 kg	27 September
Silver	Yoel Romero	Wrestling	Men's freestyle 85 kg	1 October
Silver	Lázaro Rivas	Wrestling	Men's Greco-Roman 54 kg	26 September
Silver	Juan Marén	Wrestling	Men's Greco-Roman 63 kg	26 September
Bronze	José Ángel César, Iván García, Freddy Mayola, Luis Alberto Pérez-Rionda	Athletics	Men's 4 × 100 m relay	30 September
Bronze	Osleidys Menéndez	Athletics	Women's javelin throw	30 September
Bronze	Maikro Romero	Boxing	Light Flyweight	30 September
Bronze	Diógenes Luña	Boxing	Light Welterweight	1 October
Bronze	Nelson Loyola, Carlos Pedroso, Iván Trevejo	Fencing	Men's team épée	18 September
Bronze	Manolo Poulot	Judo	Men's 60 kg	16 September
Bronze	Alexis Rodríguez	Wrestling	Men's freestyle 130 kg	30 September

== Competitors ==
The following is the list of phone number of competitors in the Games.

Sport	Men	Women	Total
Archery	2	2	4
Athletics	19	14	33
Baseball	24	–	24
Basketball	0	12	12
Boxing	12	–	12
Canoeing	3	0	3
Cycling	2	2	4
Diving	4	2	6
Fencing	7	4	11
Gymnastics	2	0	2
Handball	14	0	14
Judo	7	7	14
Rowing	6	3	9
Sailing	1	1	2
Shooting	4	2	6
Softball	–	15	15
Swimming	5	2	7
Synchronized swimming	–	2	2
Table tennis	3	2	5
Taekwondo	2	2	4
Volleyball	12	10	22
Weightlifting	5	0	5
Wrestling	13	–	13
Total	147	82	229

== Archery ==
Cuba's first appearance in the Olympic archery competition resulted in a surprise pair of victories.

Men

Athlete	Event	Ranking round		Round of 64	Round of 32	Round of 16	Quarterfinals	Semifinals	Final / BM	
Athlete	Event	Score	Seed	Opposition Score	Opposition Score	Opposition Score	Opposition Score	Opposition Score	Opposition Score	Rank
Ismely Arias	Men's individual	616	41	Parkhomenko (UKR); W 160-164	Needham (GBR); W 165-164	Fairweather (AUS); L 163-167	Did not advance			
Juan Carlos Stevens	Men's individual	595	57	Fairweather (AUS); L 161-170	Did not advance					

Women

Athlete	Event	Ranking round		Round of 64	Round of 32	Round of 16	Quarterfinals	Semifinals	Final / BM	
Athlete	Event	Score	Seed	Opposition Score	Opposition Score	Opposition Score	Opposition Score	Opposition Score	Opposition Score	Rank
Edisbel Martinez	Women's individual	611	56	Ericsson (SWE); L 146-154	Did not advance					
Yaremis Pérez	Women's individual	612	54	Yu H (CHN); W 159-155	Scavotto (USA); L 155-158	Did not advance				

== Athletics ==
Men's track

Athlete	Event	Heat		Round 2		Semifinal		Final	
Athlete	Event	Result	Rank	Result	Rank	Result	Rank	Result	Rank
Freddy Mayola	100m	10.33	3 Q	10.35	6	Did not advance			
Anier García	110m hurdles	13.60	1 Q	13.53	1 Q	13.16	1 Q	13.00 NR	1st place, gold medalist(s)
Yoel Hernandez	110m hurdles	13.53	2 Q	13.40	4 Q	13.41	5	Did not advance	
José Ángel César; Iván García; Freddy Mayola; Luis Alberto Pérez-Rionda	4 × 100 m relay	38.74	1 Q	—N/a		38.16	1 Q	38.04 SB	3rd place, bronze medalist(s)

Men's field

Athlete	Event	Qualification		Final	
Athlete	Event	Distance	Position	Distance	Position
Ivan Pedroso	Long jump	8.32	1 Q	8.55	1st place, gold medalist(s)
Luis Meliz	Long jump	8.21	2 Q	8.08	7
Michael Calvo	Triple jump	16.30	27	Did not advance	
Yoel Garcia	Triple jump	17.08	5 Q	17.47	2nd place, silver medalist(s)
Yoelbi Quesada	Triple jump	17.03	7 Q	17.37	4
Javier Sotomayor	High jump	2.27	7 Q	2.32	2nd place, silver medalist(s)
Frank Casañas	Discus throw	60.84	24	Did not advance	
Alexis Elizalde	Discus throw	61.13	20	Did not advance	
Emeterio Gonzalez	Javelin throw	82.64	10 q	83.33	8
Isbel Luaces	Javelin throw	75.17	28	Did not advance	
Alexis Paumier	Shot put	18.31	18	Did not advance	

Women's track

Athlete	Event	Heat		Quarterfinal		Semifinal		Final	
Athlete	Event	Result	Rank	Result	Rank	Result	Rank	Result	Rank
Zulia Calatayud	800m	2:00.18	3 q	—N/a		1:59.30	3 Q	1:58.66	6
Aliuska López	100m hurdles	12.97	3 Q	12.92	3 Q	12.90	4 Q	12.83	5
Daimí Pernía	400m hurdles	55.53	1 Q	—N/a		54.92	2 Q	53.68 SB	4
Idalmis Bonne; Zulia Calatayud; Julia Duporty; Daimí Pernía	4 × 400 m relay	3:25.22	2 Q	—N/a				3:29.47	8

Women's field

Athlete	Event	Qualification		Final	
Athlete	Event	Distance	Position	Distance	Position
Lissette Cuza	Long jump	6.25	26	Did not advance	
Yamile Aldama	Triple jump	14.27	7 Q	14.30	4
Ioamnet Quintero	High jump	1.92	14	Did not advance	
Yipsi Moreno	Hammer throw	65.74	4 Q	68.33	4
Sonia Bisset	Javelin throw	60.09	11 q	63.26	5
Osleidys Menéndez	Javelin throw	67.34	1 Q	66.18	3rd place, bronze medalist(s)
Xiomara Rivero	Javelin throw	61.89	5 Q	62.92	6
Yumileidi Cumbá	Shot put	18.42	8 Q	18.70	6

Decathlon

Athlete	Event	100 m	LJ	SP	HJ	400 m	110H	DT	PV	JT	1500 m	Final	Rank
Eugenio Balanque	Result	10.87	6.19	14.90	1.94	48.23	14.36	46.56	NM	Did not advance			
Eugenio Balanque	Points	890	628	784	749	898	929	799	0	Did not advance			
Raul Duany	Result	11.09	7.33	13.34	2.06	48.73	14.44	41.17	4.60	64.31	4:29.68	8054	15
Raul Duany	Points	841	893	688	859	827	918	688	790	803	747	8054	15

Heptathlon

Athlete	Event	100H	HJ	SP	200 m	LJ	JT	800 m	Final	Rank
Magalys Garcia	Result	13.46	1.66	13.29	24.58	5.92	50.31	828	6054	11
Magalys Garcia	Points	1056	806	747	926	825	866	828	6054	11

== Baseball ==
Team	Event	Group stage								Semifinal	Final / BM	
Team	Event	Opposition Score	Opposition Score	Opposition Score	Opposition Score	Opposition Score	Opposition Score	Opposition Score	Rank	Opposition Score	Opposition Score	Rank
Cuba men's	Men's tournament	South Africa; W 16–0	Italy; W 13–5	South Korea; W 6–5	Netherlands; L 2–4	Australia; W 1–0	United States; W 6–1	Japan; W 6–2	1 Q	Japan; W 3–0	United States; L 0–4	2nd place, silver medalist(s)

== Basketball ==
=== Women's tournament ===
Team roster

- Liset Castillo
- Milayda Enríquez
- Cariola Hechavarría
- Dalia Henry
- Grisel Herrera
- María León
- Yamilé Martínez
- Yaquelín Plutín
- Tania Seino
- Yuliseny Soria
- Taimara Suero
- Lisdeivis Víctores

Summary

Team	Event	Group stage						Quarterfinal	Semifinal	Final / BM	
Team	Event	Opposition Score	Opposition Score	Opposition Score	Opposition Score	Opposition Score	Rank	Opposition Score	Opposition Score	Opposition Score	Rank
Cuba women's	Women's tournament	Russia; L 62–72	United States; L 90–61	New Zealand; W 74–55	Poland; L 72–65	South Korea; L 69–56	5	—N/a		9/10th classification Canada; W 67–58	9

== Beach volleyball ==
Athlete	Event	Preliminary round	Preliminary elimination		Round of 16	Quarterfinals	Semifinals	Final	
Athlete	Event	Opposition Score	First round	Second round	Opposition Score	Opposition Score	Opposition Score	Opposition Score	Rank
Dalixia Fernández; Tamara Larrea	Women's	Pires – Samuel (BRA); L 4-15	Tian – Zhang J (CHN); W 15-12	L Yanchulova – P Yanchulova (BUL); W 15-3	Davis – Johnson Jordan (USA); L 9-15	Did not advance			=9

== Boxing ==
Athlete	Event	Round of 32	Round of 16	Quarterfinals	Semifinals	Final	
Athlete	Event	Opposition Result	Opposition Result	Opposition Result	Opposition Result	Opposition Result	Rank
Maikro Romero	Light flyweight	Varela (VEN); W 15-11	Velicu (ROM); RSC	Sidorenko (UKR); W 12-5	Asloum (FRA); L 12-13	Did not advance	3rd place, bronze medalist(s)
Manuel Mantilla	Flyweight	Kim T-g (KOR); W 20-8	Dobrescu (ROM); RSC	Ponlid (THA); L 8-19	Did not advance		
Guillermo Rigondeaux	Bantamweight	Zemzeni (TUN); W KO	Tsujimoto (JPN); RSC	Agaguloglu (TUR); W 14-5	Vinson (USA); W 18-6	Malakhbekov (RUS); W 18-12	1st place, gold medalist(s)
Yosvani Aguilera	Featherweight	Tsukamoto (JPN); RSC	Mladenov (BUL); W 15-8	Djamaloudinov (RUS); L 12-17	Did not advance		
Mario Kindelán	Lightweight	Bye	Wiangwiset (THA); W 14-8	Ouzlian (GRE); RSC	Maletin (RUS); W 27-15	Kotelnyk (UKR); W 14-4	1st place, gold medalist(s)
Diógenes Luña	Light welterweight	Bye	Blain (FRA); W 25-14	Khoulef (EGY); RSC	Williams (USA); L 41-42	Did not advance	3rd place, bronze medalist(s)
Roberto Guerra	Welterweight	Chibuye (ZAM); W 18-4	Simion (ROM); L 7-11	Did not advance			
Juan Hernandez Sierra	Light middleweight	Nzue Mba (GAB); RSC	Marmouri (TUN); RSC	Ibraimov (KAZ); L 9-16	Did not advance		
Jorge Gutierrez	Middleweight	Cimlum (THA); W 20-11	Giannoulas (GRE); W 20-7	Diaconu (ROM); W KO	Alakparov (AZE); 19-9	Gaydarbekov (RUS); W 17-15	1st place, gold medalist(s)
Isael Alvarez	Light heavyweight	Fragomeni (ITA); RSC	Orazaliyev (KAZ); RSC	Did not advance			
Félix Savón	Heavyweight	—N/a	Ojemaye (NGR); RSC	Bennett (USA); RSC	Kober (GER); W 14-8	Ibragimov (RUS); W 21-13	1st place, gold medalist(s)
Alexis Rubalcaba	Super heavyweight	—N/a	Koç (GER); W KO	Dildabekov (KAZ); L 12-25	Did not advance		

== Canoeing ==
=== Sprint ===
Men's

Athlete	Event	Heats		Semifinals		Final	
Athlete	Event	Time	Rank	Time	Rank	Time	Rank
Ledis Frank Balceiro	Men's C-1 500m	1:51.918	3 Q	Bye		2:32.229	6
Ledis Frank Balceiro	Men's C-1 1000m	3:55.120	1 Q	Bye		3:56.071	2nd place, silver medalist(s)
Leobaldo Pereira; Ibrahin Rojas	Men's C-2 500m	1:42.180	2 Q	Bye		2:17.126	9
Leobaldo Pereira; Ibrahin Rojas	Men's C-2 1000m	3:38.978	3 Q	Bye		3:38.753	2nd place, silver medalist(s)

== Cycling ==
=== Road cycling ===
Athlete	Event	Time	Rank
Pedro Pablo Pérez	Men's road race	5:52:48	92
Dania Pérez	Women's road race	3:28:28	46
Yoanka González	Women's road race	DNF	

=== Track cycling ===
Sprint

Athlete	Event	Qualification		Round 1	Repechage 1	Round 2	Repechage 2	Quarterfinals	Semifinals	Final	
Athlete	Event	Time Speed (km/h)	Rank	Opposition Time Speed (km/h)	Opposition Time Speed (km/h)	Opposition Time Speed (km/h)	Opposition Time Speed (km/h)	Opposition Time Speed (km/h)	Opposition Time Speed (km/h)	Opposition Time Speed (km/h)	Rank
Julio César Herrera	Men's sprint	10.893s 66.097 km/h	17 Q	Gane (FRA); L	MacLean (GBR); Ota (JPN); 3	Did not advance					

Time trial

Athlete	Event	Time	Rank
Julio César Herrera	Men's track time trial	1:05.537	10

== Diving ==
Men's

Athlete	Event	Preliminaries		Semifinals				Final		
Athlete	Event	Points	Rank	Points	Rank	Total	Rank	Points	Total	Rank
Erick Fornaris	Men's 3m springboard	313.86	37	Did not advance						
Yoendris Salazar	Men's 3m springboard	377.58	18 Q	197.52	17	575.10	18	Did not advance		
José Guerra	Men's 10m platform	403.14	13 Q	181.65	13	584.79	14	Did not advance		
Jesus Iory	Men's 10m platform	368.34	22	Did not advance						

Women's

Athlete	Event	Preliminaries		Semifinals				Final		
Athlete	Event	Points	Rank	Points	Rank	Total	Rank	Points	Total	Rank
Iohana Cruz	Women's 3m springboard	239.97	24	Did not advance						
Yolanda Ortiz	Women's 10m platform	231.63	31	Did not advance						

== Fencing ==
Eleven fencers, seven men and four women, represented Cuba in 2000.

Men

Athlete	Event	Round of 64	Round of 32	Round of 16	Quarterfinal	Semifinal	Final / BM	
Athlete	Event	Opposition Score	Opposition Score	Opposition Score	Opposition Score	Opposition Score	Opposition Score	Rank
Nelson Loyola	Men's épée	Horbachuk (UKR); L 14-15	Did not advance					
Carlos Pedroso	Men's épée	Adams (AUS); L 13-15	Did not advance					
Ivan Trevejo	Men's épée	Bye	Poddubny (KGZ); W 15-10	Rota (ITA); W 15-12	Kolobkov (RUS); L 14-15	Did not advance		
Oscar García	Men's foil	Bye	Mocek (POL); L 9-15	Did not advance				
Elvis Gregory	Men's foil	Bye	Muhsen Ali (KUW); W 15-5	Shevchenko (RUS) 'L 14-15	Did not advance			
Rolando Tucker	Men's foil	Bye	Wendt (AUT); W 15-5	Ferrari (FRA); L 13-15	Did not advance			
Cándido Maya	Men's sabre	Lupeică (ROU); L 10-15	Did not advance					
Nelson Loyola; Carlos Pedroso; Ivan Trevejo	Men's team épée	—N/a			Germany; W 45-44	France; L 36-45	South Korea 'W 45-31	3rd place, bronze medalist(s)
Elvis Gregory; Oscar García; Rolando Tucker	Men's team foil	—N/a			France; L 43-45	Did not advance		

Women

Athlete	Event	Round of 64	Round of 32	Round of 16	Quarterfinal	Semifinal	Final / BM	
Athlete	Event	Opposition Score	Opposition Score	Opposition Score	Opposition Score	Opposition Score	Opposition Score	Rank
Tamara Esteri	Women's épée	Bye	Ortiz (CUB); L 7-15	Did not advance				
Mirayda García	Women's épée	Bye	Hablützel-Bürki (SUI); L 14-15	Did not advance				
Zuleydis Ortiz	Women's épée	Bye	Esteri (CUB); W 15-7	Romagnoli (SUI); W 15-11	Hablützel-Bürki (SUI); L 14-15	Did not advance		
Migsey Dussu	Women's foil	Vasylieva (UKR); W 15-6	Badea-Cârlescu (ROU); L 6-15	Did not advance				
Tamara Esteri; Mirayda García; Zuleydis Ortiz	Women's team épée	—N/a			Switzerland; L 38-45	Did not advance		

== Gymnastics ==
Men's artistic

Athlete	Event	Qualification								Final							
Athlete	Event	Apparatus						Total	Rank	Apparatus						Total	Rank
Athlete	Event	F	PH	R	V	PB	HB	Total	Rank	F	PH	R	V	PB	HB	Total	Rank
Lazaro Lamelas	Individual	9.137	9.437	9.387	9.312	8.887	9.562	55.722	35 Q	8.775	9.262	9.437	9.262	9.275	9.575	55.586	30
Erick López	Individual	8.975	9.500	9.637	9.537	9.062	9.412	56.123	28 Q	8.662	9.600	9.675	9.687	9.612	9.575	56.811	17

== Handball ==
=== Men's tournament ===
- Amauris Cardenas
- Damian Cuesta
- Diego Wong
- Félix Romero
- Freddy Suárez
- José Hernández
- Juan González
- Luis Silveira
- Miguel Montes
- Misael Iglesias
- Odael Marcos
- Raúl Hardy
- Rolando Uríos
- Yunier Noris

Team	Event	Group stage						Quarterfinal	Semifinal	Final / BM	
Team	Event	Opposition Score	Opposition Score	Opposition Score	Opposition Score	Opposition Score	Rank	Opposition Score	Opposition Score	Opposition Score	Rank
Cuba men's	Men's tournament	Germany; L 20–30	Russia; L 26–21	Egypt; L 26–29	FR Yugoslavia; L 26–33	South Korea; L 28–35	6	—N/a		11/12th classification Australia; W 26–24	11

== Judo ==
Men

Athlete	Event	Round of 32	Round of 16	Quarterfinals	Semifinals	Repechage 1	Repechage 2	Repechage 3	Final / BM	
Athlete	Event	Opposition Result	Opposition Result	Opposition Result	Opposition Result	Opposition Result	Opposition Result	Opposition Result	Opposition Result	Rank
Manolo Poulot	60kg	Stanev (RUS); W 1001–0000	Smagulov (KGZ); W 1000–0010	Kurdgelashvili (MDA); W 1000–0000	Nomura (JPN); L 0002–0010	Bye			Donbay (KAZ); W 0210–0000	3rd place, bronze medalist(s)
Yordanis Arencibia	66kg	Vazagashvili (GEO); L 0001-1000	Did not advance							
Hector Lombard	73kg	Awad (EGY); W 1010-0000	Bilodid (UKR); L 0020-1010	Did not advance						
Gabriel Arteaga	81kg	Krawczyk (POL); W 1000-0000	Aragão (BRA); W 0010-0000	Bouras (FRA); L 0001-1001	—N/a	Arens (NED); L 0000-0001	Did not advance			
Yosvany Despaigne	90kg	Huizinga (NED); L 0100-1011	—N/a			Olson (USA); L 0000-1001	Did not advance			
Yosvani Kessel	100kg	Inoue (JPN); L 0000-1000	—N/a			Gowing (NZL); W 1000-0001	Ze'evi (ISR); L 0010-0120	Did not advance		
Angel Sanchez	+100kg	Boonzaayer (USA); W 1000-0000	Qerewaqa (FIJ); W 1000-0000	Ruslyakov (UKR); W 0010-0001	Shionhara (JPN); L 0001-0010	—N/a	Sharapov (BLR); L 0100-1000	Did not advance		

Women

Athlete	Event	Round of 32	Round of 16	Quarterfinals	Semifinals	Repechage 1	Repechage 2	Repechage 3	Final / BM	
Athlete	Event	Opposition Result	Opposition Result	Opposition Result	Opposition Result	Opposition Result	Opposition Result	Opposition Result	Opposition Result	Rank
Amarilis Savón	48kg	—N/a	Moise (ROM); W	Bruletova (RUS); L	—N/a		Dunn (GBR); W	Simons (BEL); L	Did not advance	
Legna Verdecia	52kg	—N/a	Leon (ESP); W	Mariani (ARG); W	Kye (PRK); W	—N/a			Narazaki (JPN); W	1st place, gold medalist(s)
Driulis Gonzalez	57kg	—N/a	Harel (FRA); W	Lomba (BEL); W	Shen J (CHN); W	—N/a			Fernández (ESP); L	2nd place, silver medalist(s)
Kenia Rodriguez	63kg	Yusuf (NGR); W	Roberts (GBR); L	Did not advance						
Sibelis Veranes	70kg	—N/a	Wansart (GER); W	Bacher (USA); W	Cho M-S (KOR); W	—N/a			Howey (GBR); W	1st place, gold medalist(s)
Diadenis Luna	78kg	Ribble (CAN); W	Tong (USA); W	Richter (ROM); W	Lebrun (FRA); L	—N/a			Pierantozzi (ITA); L	5
Daima Beltran	+78kg	Kim S-Y (KOR); W	Curren (AUS); W	Oliver (BEL); W	Yamashita (JPN); W	—N/a			Yuan H (CHN); L	2nd place, silver medalist(s)

== Rowing ==
Men

Athlete	Event	Heats		Repechage		Semifinals		Final	
Athlete	Event	Time	Rank	Time	Rank	Time	Rank	Time	Rank
Yoennis Hernandez; Yosbel Martinez	Men's double sculls	6:40.27	4 R	6:35.76	3 SA/B	6:40.71	6 FB	6:40.71	12
Raúl León; Osmani Martin	Men's lightweight double sculls	6:42.24	3 R	6:44.08	3	Withdrew			
Eusebio Acea; Yoennis Hernandez; Yosbel Martinez; Leonides Samé	Men's quadruple sculls	6:00.67	4 R	6:04.45	1 Q	6:01.39	6 FB	6:00.63	12

Women

Athlete	Event	Heats		Repechage		Semifinals		Final	
Athlete	Event	Time	Rank	Time	Rank	Time	Rank	Time	Rank
Mayra Gonzalez	Women's single sculls	7:48.28	3 R	7:46.25	1 SA/B	7:38.97	4 FB	7:32.29	7
Marlenis Mesa; Dailin Taset	Women's lightweight double sculls	7:38.26	6 R	7:29.10	4 FC	—N/a		7:19.63	15

== Sailing ==
Athlete	Event	Race											Net points	Final rank
Athlete	Event	1	2	3	4	5	6	7	8	9	10	11	Net points	Final rank
Anayansi Perez	Women's Mistral	26	(28)	19	23	27	24	27	27	(28)	27	26	282	27
Jose Urbay	Laser	32	14	37	27	37	31	35	22	(44)	35	26	259	35

== Shooting ==
Men

Athlete	Event	Qualification		Final	
Athlete	Event	Score	Rank	Score	Rank
Norbelis Bárzaga	10 m air pistol	566	33	Did not advance	
Norbelis Bárzaga	50 m pistol	547	30	Did not advance	
Leuris Pupo	25 m rapid fire pistol	584	9	Did not advance	
Juan Miguel Rodríguez	Skeet	116	39	Did not advance	
Guillermo Torres	Skeet	115	43	Did not advance	

Women

Athlete	Event	Qualification		Final	
Athlete	Event	Score	Rank	Score	Rank
Eunice Caballero	50 m rifle three positions	567	30	Did not advance	
Eunice Caballero	10 m air rifle	388	36	Did not advance	
Margarita Tarradell	25 m pistol	575	20	Did not advance	
Margarita Tarradell	10 m air pistol	381	11	Did not advance	

== Softball ==
=== Women's tournament ===
Team roster

- Vilma Álvarez
- María Arceo
- Yuneisy Castillo
- Yamila Degrase
- Laritza Espinosa
- Yamila Flor
- Haydée Hernández
- Luisa Medina
- Estela Milañes
- Yarisleidis Peña
- Diamela Puentes
- Niolis Ramos
- Olga Ruyol
- María Santana
- María Zamora

Summary

Team	Event	Group stage								Semifinal	Final / BM	
Team	Event	Opposition Score	Opposition Score	Opposition Score	Opposition Score	Opposition Score	Opposition Score	Opposition Score	Rank	Opposition Score	Opposition Score	Rank
Cuba women's	Women's tournament	Japan; L 1–4	United States; L 0–3	Italy; L 0–1	New Zealand; L 6–2	China; L 0–7	Canada; W 2–1	Australia; L 1-8	7	Did not advance		

== Swimming ==
Men

Athlete	Event	Heat		Semifinal		Final	
Athlete	Event	Time	Rank	Time	Rank	Time	Rank
Marcos Hernández	50m freestyle	23.20	33	Did not advance			
Marcos Hernández	100m freestyle	50.96	30	Did not advance			
Rodolfo Falcon	100m backstroke	55.61	11 Q	55.59	6	Did not advance	
Neisser Bent	200m backstroke	2:02.05	24	Did not advance			
Yohan Garcia	100m butterfly	55.74	43	Did not advance			
Gunter Rodriguez	200m butterfly	2:01.06	27	Did not advance			
Rodolfo Falcon; Yohan Garcia; Marcos Hernández; Gunter Rodriguez	4 × 100 m medley relay	3:46.88	20	Did not advance			

Women

Athlete	Event	Heat		Semifinal		Final	
Athlete	Event	Time	Rank	Time	Rank	Time	Rank
Ana Maria González	100m backstroke	1:04.95	30	Did not advance			
Ana Maria González	200m backstroke	2:19.35	26	Did not advance			
Imaday Núñez	100m breaststroke	1:13.91	31	Did not advance			
Imaday Núñez	200m breaststroke	2:41.97	34	Did not advance			

== Synchronized swimming ==
Athlete	Event	Technical routine		Free routine (preliminary)			Free routine (final)		
Athlete	Event	Points	Rank	Points	Total (technical + free)	Rank	Points	Total (technical + free)	Rank
Kenia Perez; Yamisleidys Romay	Duet	29.913	18	55.596	85.509	18	Did not advance		

== Table tennis ==
Athlete	Event	Group stage			Round of 32	Round of 16	Quarterfinals	Semifinals	Final / BM	
Athlete	Event	Opposition Result	Opposition Result	Rank	Opposition Result	Opposition Result	Opposition Result	Opposition Result	Opposition Result	Rank
Francisco Arado	Men's singles	Iseki (JPN); L 0–3	Cheng (USA); L 0-3	3	Did not advance					
Renier Sosa	Men's singles	Huang (CAN); L 0-3	Toriola (NGR); L 1-3	3	Did not advance					

== Taekwondo ==
Men

Athlete	Event	Round of 16	Quarterfinals	Semifinals	Repechage 1	Repechage 2	Final / BM	
Athlete	Event	Opposition Result	Opposition Result	Opposition Result	Opposition Result	Opposition Result	Opposition Result	Rank
Ángel Matos	Men's 80kg	Soto (CHI); W 9-2	Estrada (MEX); W 2-0	Livaja (SWE); W 4-0	Bye		Ebnoutalib (GER); W 3-1	1st place, gold medalist(s)
Nelson Saenz	Men's +80kg	Bye	Gentil (FRA); L KO	Did not advance				

Women

Athlete	Event	Round of 16	Quarterfinals	Semifinals	Repechage 1	Repechage 2	Final / BM	
Athlete	Event	Opposition Result	Opposition Result	Opposition Result	Opposition Result	Opposition Result	Opposition Result	Rank
Urbia Melendez	Women's 49kg	Pérez (MEX); W 4-1	Thamae (LES); W 3-0	Güvenc (TUR); W 3-1	Bye		Burns (AUS); L 2-4	2nd place, silver medalist(s)
Sonallis Mayan	Women's +67kg	Ruiz (ESP); L 0-3	Did not advance					

== Volleyball ==
Men's roster

- Alexei Argilagos
- Ángel Dennis
- Raúl Diago
- Yosenki García
- Ramón Gato
- Ihosvany Hernández
- Osvaldo Hernández
- Leonel Marshall
- Pavel Pimienta
- Alain Roca
- Iván Ruíz
- Nicolás Vives
- Head coach: Juan Díaz Marino

Women's roster

- Taismary Agüero
- Zoila Barros
- Regla Bell
- Marlenis Costa
- Ana Fernández
- Mirka Francia
- Idalmis Gato
- Lilia Izquierdo
- Mireya Luis
- Yumilka Ruíz
- Martha Sánchez
- Regla Torres
- Head coach: Luis Felipe Calderón

Summary

Team	Event	Group stage						Quarterfinal	Semifinal	Final / BM	
Team	Event	Opposition Score	Opposition Score	Opposition Score	Opposition Score	Opposition Score	Rank	Opposition Score	Opposition Score	Opposition Score	Rank
Cuba men's	Men's tournament	Netherlands; L 0–3	Spain; W 3–1	Egypt; W 3–0	Australia; W 3–0	Brazil; L 0–3	3 Q	Russia; L 2–3	5/8th semifinals Brazil; L 2–3	7th classification match Australia; W 3–0	7
Cuba women's	Women's tournament	Germany; W 3–0	Russia; L 2–3	South Korea; W 3–0	Italy; W 3–0	Peru; W 3–1	2 Q	Croatia; W 3–0	Brazil; W 3–2	Russia; W 3–2	1st place, gold medalist(s)

== Weightlifting ==
Men

Athlete	Event	Snatch			Clean & jerk			Total	Rank
Athlete	Event	1	2	3	1	2	3	Total	Rank
Sergio Álvarez	– 56 kg	~~120.0~~	120.0	~~125.0~~	150.0	155.0	~~160.0~~	275.0	5
Idalberto Aranda	–77kg	145.0	150.0	~~155.0~~	~~200.0~~	200.0	~~208.0~~	350.0	9
Ernesto Quiroga	– 85 kg	157.5	162.5	165.0	202.5	207.5	210.0	375.0	8
Joel Mackenzie	– 85 kg	157.5	162.5	165.0	192.5	197.5	200.0	365.0	11
Michel Batista	–94kg	170.0	175.0	~~180.0~~	~~205.0~~	205.0	210.0	385.0	9

== Wrestling ==
Men's freestyle

Athlete	Event	Elimination Pool				Quarterfinal	Semifinal	Final / BM	
Athlete	Event	Opposition Result	Opposition Result	Opposition Result	Rank	Opposition Result	Opposition Result	Opposition Result	Rank
Wilfredo García	-54kg	Donbaev (KGZ); W 4–1	Kantoyeu (BLR); L 7–1	—N/a	3	Did not advance			
Carlos Ortiz	-63kg	Tushishvili (GEO); W 6–1	Miyata (JPN); W 4–1	—N/a	1 Q	Barzakov (BUL); L 1–4	Did not advance		
Yosvany Sánchez	-69kg	Kasabov (BUL); W 4–0	Dąbrowski (POL); W 7–0	—N/a	1 Q	Igali (CAN); L 1–3	Did not advance		
Yosmany Romero	-76kg	Leipold (GER); L 1–4	Gadžihanov (MKD); L 0–3	Kertanti (SVK); W 3–2	3	Did not advance			
Yoel Romero	-85kg	Samušonoks (LAT); W 3–0	Abdou (CAN); W 8–0	Kurugliyev (KAZ); W 4–0	1 Q	Bye	Khadem (IRI); W 3–0	Saitiev (RUS); L 1–7	2nd place, silver medalist(s)
Wilfredo Morales	-97kg	Magomedov (AZE); L 0–3	Bayramukov (KAZ); W 2–0	—N/a	3	Did not advance			
Alexis Rodríguez	-130kg	Kochev (BUL); W 2–0	Sumiyaabazar (MGL); W 1–1	—N/a	1 Q	Medvedev (BLR); W 4–0	Taymazov (UZB); TO	Jadidi (IRI); W 1–0	3rd place, bronze medalist(s)

Men's Greco-Roman

Athlete	Event	Elimination Pool				Quarterfinal	Semifinal	Final / BM	
Athlete	Event	Opposition Result	Opposition Result	Opposition Result	Rank	Opposition Result	Opposition Result	Opposition Result	Rank
Lázaro Rivas	-54kg	Yıldız (TUR); W 10–0	Eyvazov (AZE); W 6–1	Pellew (NZL); W 15–0	1 Q	Bye	Kalashnykov (UKR); W 11–0	Sim (KOR); L 0–8	2nd place, silver medalist(s)
Juan Marén	-63kg	Singh (IND); W 8–0	Manukyan (KAZ); W 5–3	Djakrir (ALG); W 4–1	1 Q	Bye	Motzer (SUI); W 3–0	V Samurgashev (RUS); L 0–3	2nd place, silver medalist(s)
Filiberto Azcuy	-69kg	Memet (ROU); W 4–3	Abdo (AUS); W 10–0	—N/a	1 Q	Son (KOR); W 9–2	Nikitin (EST); W 6–0	Nagata (JPN); W 11–0	1st place, gold medalist(s)
Luis Enrique Méndez	-85kg	Clark (USA); W 5–0	Abdelfatah (EGY); W 4–3	—N/a	1 Q	Yerlikaya (TUR); L 0–3	Did not advance		
Reynaldo Peña	-97kg	Matviyenko (KAZ); W 1–0	R Samurgashev (ARM); L 0–1	—N/a	3	Did not advance			
Héctor Milián	-130kg	Zhao H (CHN); W 1–0	Hallik (EST); W 3–0	—N/a	1 Q	Debelka (BLR); L 0–1	Did not advance		

== See also ==
- Cuba at the 1999 Pan American Games
- Cuba at the 2000 Summer Paralympics

== Notes ==
- Wallechinsky, David (2004). The Complete Book of the Summer Olympics (Athens 2004 Edition). Toronto, Canada. ISBN 1-894963-32-6.
- International Olympic Committee (2001). The Results. Retrieved 12 November 2005.
- Sydney Organising Committee for the Olympic Games (2001). Official Report of the XXVII Olympiad Volume 1: Preparing for the Games. Retrieved 20 November 2005.
- Sydney Organising Committee for the Olympic Games (2001). Official Report of the XXVII Olympiad Volume 2: Celebrating the Games. Retrieved 20 November 2005.
- Sydney Organising Committee for the Olympic Games (2001). The Results. Retrieved 20 November 2005.
- International Olympic Committee Web Site
