= Handball at the 2000 Summer Olympics – Men's team rosters =

List of handball players

The following squads and players competed in the men's handball tournament at the 2000 Summer Olympics.

== Australia ==
The following players represented Australia:

- Brendon Taylor
- Cristian Bajan
- Darryl McCormack
- David Gonzalez
- Dragan Sestic
- Karim Shehab
- Kristian Groenintwoud
- Lee Schofield
- Milan Slavujevic
- Peter Bach
- Rajan Pavlovic
- Russell Garnett
- Sasa Sestic
- Taip Ramadani
- Vernon Cheung

== Cuba ==
The following players represented Cuba:

- Amauris Cardenas
- Damian Cuesta
- Diego Wong
- Félix Romero
- Freddy Suárez
- José Hernández
- Juan González
- Luis Silveira
- Miguel Montes
- Misael Iglesias
- Odael Marcos
- Raúl Hardy
- Rolando Uríos
- Yunier Noris

== Egypt ==
The following players represented Egypt:

- Ahmed Belal
- Amro El-Geioushy
- Ashraf Mabrouk Awaad
- Ayman El-Alfy
- Hany El-Fakharany
- Hazem Awaad
- Saber Hussein
- Hussain Said
- Hussain Zaky
- Magdy Abou El-Magd
- Mohamed Bakir El-Nakib
- Gohar Al-Nil
- Sherif Moemen
- Marwan Ragab
- Mohamed Sharaf El-Din

== France ==
The following players represented France:

- Andrej Golic
- Bertrand Gille
- Bruno Martini
- Cédric Burdet
- Christian Gaudin
- Didier Dinart
- Grégory Anquetil
- Guéric Kervadec
- Guillaume Gille
- Jackson Richardson
- Jérôme Fernandez
- Marc Wiltberger
- Olivier Girault
- Patrick Cazal
- Stéphane Joulin

== Germany ==
The following players represented Germany:

- Bernd Roos
- Bogdan Wenta
- Christian Schwarzer
- Daniel Stephan
- Florian Kehrmann
- Frank von Behren
- Henning Fritz
- Jan Holpert
- Jörg Kunze
- Klaus-Dieter Petersen
- Markus Baur
- Mike Bezdicek
- Stefan Kretzschmar
- Sven Lakenmacher
- Volker Zerbe

== Russia ==
The following players represented Russia:

- Dmitry Filippov
- Vyacheslav Gorpishin
- Oleg Khodkov
- Eduard Koksharov
- Denis Krivoshlykov
- Vasily Kudinov
- Stanislav Kulinchenko
- Dmitry Kuzelev
- Andrey Lavrov
- Igor Lavrov
- Sergey Pogorelov
- Pavel Sukosyan
- Dmitri Torgovanov
- Aleksandr Tuchkin
- Lev Voronin

== Slovenia ==
The following players represented Slovenia:

- Aleš Pajovič
- Andrej Kastelic
- Beno Lapajne
- Branko Bedekovič
- Gregor Cvijič
- Iztok Puc
- Jani Likavec
- Renato Vugrinec
- Roman Pungartnik
- Rolando Pušnik
- Tettey-Sowah Banfro
- Tomaž Tomšič
- Uroš Šerbec
- Zoran Jovičič
- Zoran Lubej

== South Korea ==
The following players represented South Korea:

- Jo Beom-yeon
- Jo Chi-hyo
- Choi Hyeon-ho
- Hong Gi-il
- Gang Il-gu
- Lee Jae-wu
- Lee Seok-hyeong
- Mun Byeong-uk
- Baek Won-cheol
- Park Jeong-jin
- Park Min-cheol
- Park Seong-rip
- Yun Gyeong-min
- Yun Gyeong-sin

== Spain ==
The following players represented Spain:

- David Barrufet
- Talant Duyshebaev
- Mateo Garralda
- Rafael Guijosa
- Demetrio Lozano
- Enric Masip
- Jordi Núñez
- Jesús Olalla
- Juan Pérez
- Xavier O'Callaghan
- Antonio Carlos Ortega
- Antonio Ugalde
- Iñaki Urdangarín
- Alberto Urdiales
- Andrei Xepkin

== Sweden ==
The following players represented Sweden:

- Magnus Andersson
- Martin Boquist
- Martin Frändesjö
- Mathias Franzén
- Peter Gentzel
- Andreas Larsson
- Ola Lindgren
- Stefan Lövgren
- Staffan Olsson
- Johan Petersson
- Tomas Svensson
- Tomas Sivertsson
- Pierre Thorsson
- Ljubomir Vranjes
- Magnus Wislander

== Tunisia ==
The following players represented Tunisia:

- Ali Madi
- Anouar Ayed
- Dhaker Seboui
- Haikel Meguennem
- Issam Tej
- Makrem Jerou
- Mohamed Madi
- Mohamed Messaoudi
- Mohamed Riadh Sanaa
- Oualid Ben Amor
- Ouissem Bousnina
- Ouissem Hmam
- Slim Zehani
- Sobhi Sioud

== Yugoslavia ==
The following players represented Yugoslavia:

- Aleksandar Knežević
- Arpad Šterbik
- Dejan Perić
- Dragan Škrbić
- Goran Đukanović
- Igor Butulija
- Ivan Lapčević
- Nebojša Golić
- Nedeljko Jovanović
- Nenad Peruničić
- Petar Kapisoda
- Ratko Nikolić
- Ratko Đurković
- Vladan Matić
- Žikica Milosavljević
