= Hong (Korean surname) =

Korean surname 홍

- Hangul: 홍
- Hanja: 洪
- RR: Hong
- MR: Hong

Hong is the common English spelling of 홍, in hanja. It means "wide" or "big".

== Clans ==
As with all Korean family names, the holders of the Hong surname are divided into different patrilineal clans, or lineages, based on their ancestral seat. Most such clans trace their lineage back to a specific founder. This system was at its height under the yangban aristocracy of the Joseon Dynasty, but it remains in use today. There are approximately 241 such clans claimed by South Koreans. Historically, there had been 10 clans known but currently there are four clans remaining. Hong clans include Namyang, Pungsan, Bugye, and Hongju.

=== Namyang clan ===
The biggest clan is Namyang clan (Korean: 남양 홍씨; Hanja: 南陽 洪氏; RR: Namyang Hongssi) whose founder was Hong Eun-yeol in the Goryeo Dynasty. Another founder of this clan was Hong Seon-haeng. Thus, the Namyang Hong clan is unique among Korean surnames in that it includes two separate unrelated family lines.

=== Pungsan clan ===
All ancestry of Andong's Pungsan Hong (Korean: 풍산 홍씨; Hanja: 豊山 洪氏; RR: Pungsan Hongssi) may be traced to the Goryeo dynasty's Hong Ji-gyeong, later known as a great master of Korean classical verse in the Joseon Dynasty. The Pungsan Hong were known as yangban among yangbans. Hong Jin was a direct descendant of Hong Ji-gyeong.

== Notable historical examples ==
Famous Koreans from the past with this family name:

- Hong Beom-do (1868–1943), Korean independence activist
- Hong Taeyong (1731–1783), Joseon philosopher, astronomer, and mathematician
- Hong Gyeong-nae (1771–1812), Joseon rebel leader
- Hong Jin (1877–1946), Korean independence activist
- Hong Sa-ik (1889–1946), Korean-Japanese war criminal
- Hong Uwŏn (1605–1687), Joseon scholar and writer

== Current notable people ==
- Hong Ah-reum (born 1989), South Korean actress
- Hong Bi-ra (born 1996), South Korean actress
- Hong Byung-hee (born 1971), South Korean chemist
- Hong Cha-ok (born 1970), South Korean former table tennis player, Olympic bronze medalist
- Hong Chang-ki (born 1993), South Korean professional baseball player
- Hong Changsoo (born 1964), South Korean playwright
- Masamori Tokuyama (born Hong Chang-soo, born 1974), Japanese-born Korean former professional boxer
- Hong Chol, North Korean former table tennis player
- Hong Chul (born 1990), South Korean footballer
- Hong Chul-ho (born 1968), South Korean rower
- Hong Da-bin (stage name DPR Live, 1993), South Korean rapper
- Dennis Hong (born 1971), American mechanical engineer and roboticist
- Hong Deok-young (1926–2005), South Korean football player, manager, referee
- Hong Dong-hyun (born 1991), South Korean footballer
- Hong Eui-jeong (born 1982), South Korean film director, screenwriter, producer
- Hong Eun-ah (born 1980), South Korean former football referee
- Hong Eun-chae (born 2006), South Korean singer, member of girl group Le Sserafim
- Hong Eun-hee (born 1980), South Korean actress
- Hong Eun-seong (born 1983), South Korean field hockey player
- Euny Hong, Korean American journalist and author
- Francis Hong Yong-ho (1906–?), Roman Catholic prelate in North Korea
- Gene Hong, Korean American actor, producer, and screenwriter
- Hong Gi-il (born 1974), South Korean handball player
- Hong Gil-soon, North Korean former table tennis player
- Hong Gyeong-seop (born 1971), South Korean field hockey player
- Hong Hei-kyung (born 1959), Korean-American operatic soprano
- Hong Hwa-ri (born 2005), South Korean actress
- Hong Hwa-yeon (born 1998), South Korean actress and model
- Hong Hye-ji (born 1996), South Korean footballer
- Hong Hyun-bin (born 1997), South Korean baseball player
- Hong Hyun Hee (born 1982), South Korean comedian and entertainer
- Hong Hyun-hee (born 1982), South Korean former basketball player
- Hong Hyun-hui (born 1991), South Korean former tennis player
- Hong Hyun-seok (born 1999), South Korean footballer
- Hong Il-chon (born 1942), the first wife of Kim Jong Il
- Hong In-bom, North Korean politician
- Hong In-gi (born 1961), South Korean alpine skier
- Hong In-young (born 1985), South Korean actress
- Hong Jang-won (born 1964), South Korean political appointee
- Jay Hong (born 1986), South Korean singer-songwriter and producer
- Jeongdo Hong (born 1977), South Korean media mogul and journalist
- Hong Jeong-ho (handballer) (born 1974), South Korean retired handball player, Olympic gold medalist
- Hong Jeong-ho (born 1989), South Korean footballer
- Hong Jeong-nam (born 1988), South Korean footballer
- Hong Jeong-un (born 1994), South Korean footballer
- Hong Ji-hee (born 1988), South Korean actress
- Hong Ji-hoon (born 1988), South Korean badminton player
- Hong Ji-hui (born 1972), South Korean swimmer
- Hong Ji-yeon (born 1970), South Korean retired volleyball player
- Hong Ji-yoon (born 1991), South Korean actress
- Hong Jin-gi (born 1990), South Korean footballer
- Hong Jin-ho (born 1982), South Korean television personality and poker player
- Hong Jin-joo (born 1983), South Korean professional golfer
- Hong Jin-ki (1917–1986), South Korean media mogul, jurist, politician
- Hong Jin-kyung (born 1977), South Korean entrepreneur, model, actress, comedian
- Hong Jin-sub (born 1985), South Korean footballer
- Hong Jin-young (born 1985), South Korean singer
- Hong Jong-chan (born 1976), South Korean television director
- Hong Jong-hak (born 1959), South Korean government minister and emeritus professor
- Hong Jong-hyun (born 1990), South Korean model and actor
- Hong Jong-o (1925–2011), South Korean long-distance runner
- Hong Joon-pyo (born 1953), South Korean politician
- Joshua Hong (born 1995), American singer, member of boy band Seventeen
- Hong Jung-eun (born 1974), South Korean screenwriter
- Hong Jung-min (born 1978), South Korean politician, lawyer, start-up company founder
- Hong Jung-wook (born 1970), South Korean entrepreneur, businessman, politician
- Hong Kuk-hyon (born 1990), North Korean judoka
- Hong Kun-pyo (born 1965), South Korean cross-country skier
- Hong Kyung (born 1996), South Korean actor
- Kyung-hee Hong (born 1954), South Korean sculptor
- Hong Kyung-min (born 1976), South Korean singer
- Hong Kyung-pyo (born 1962), South Korean cinematographer
- Hong Kyung-suk (born 1984), South Korean football coach and former player
- Hong Mi-ran (born 1977), South Korean screenwriter
- Hong Min-gi (born 2002), South Korean actor and model
- Hong Min-pyo (born 1984), South Korean professional Go player
- Hong Moo-won (born 1981), South Korean boxer
- Hong Moon-jong (born 1955), South Korean politician
- Hong Myong-gum (born 1986), North Korean footballer
- Hong Myong-hui (footballer) (born 1991), North Korean footballer
- Hong Myung-bo (born 1969), South Korean football manager and former player
- Hong Nam-ki (born 1960), South Korean politician
- Hong Nam-sun (born 1945), South Korean volleyball player
- Hong Nan-pa (1898–1941), Korean musician
- Nansook Hong (born 1966), South Korean author
- Hong Ok-song (born 1984), North Korean judoka
- Hong Ra-hee (born 1945), South Korean billionaire businesswoman
- Hong Ri-na (born 1968), South Korean actress
- Hong Sang-sam (born 1990), South Korean baseball player
- Hong Sang-soo (born 1960), South Korean film director and screenwriter
- Hong Sehwa (1947–2024), South Korean journalist
- Hong Seo-young (born 1995), South Korean actress, singer, and model
- Hong Seok-cheon (born 1971), South Korean actor
- Hong Seok-hyun (born 1949), South Korean media mogul
- Hong Seok-jae (born 1983), South Korean film director and screenwriter
- Seokju Hong (born 2003), South Korean footballer
- Hong Seong-chan (born 1997), South Korean tennis player
- Hong Seong-hui (born 1969), South Korean rhythmic gymnast
- Hong Seong-ik (born 1940), South Korean former cyclist
- Hong Seong-yo (born 1979), South Korean footballer
- Hong Seung-han (born 2003), South Korean singer
- Hong Seung-hee (born 1997), South Korean actress
- Hong Seung-hyun (born 1996), South Korean footballer
- Hong Seung-ki (born 1984), South Korean badminton player
- Hong Seung-pyo (born 1962), South Korean sport shooter
- Hong Seung-yeon (born 1992), South Korean former tennis player
- Hong Si-hoo (born 2001), South Korean footballer
- Giriboy (born Hong Si-young, 1991), South Korean rapper
- Sin Cha Hong (born 1943), South Korean modern dancer
- Hong Sok-hyong (born 1936), North Korean politician
- Hong Sok-jung (born 1941), North Korean writer
- Hong Song-nam (1929–2009), North Korean politician
- Soo Hong, American politician and lawyer
- Hong Soo-ah (born 1986), South Korean actress
- Hong Soo-hwan (born 1950), South Korean former boxer
- Hong Soo-hyun (born 1981), South Korean actress
- Hong Sook-ja (born 1933), South Korean activist, politician, writer
- Hong Soon-hak (born 1980), South Korean footballer
- Hong Soon-hwa (born 1968), South Korean former table tennis player
- Hong Soon-young (1937–2014), South Korean diplomat
- Hong Su-jong (born 1986/1989), North Korean artistic gymnast
- Hong Su-zu (born 1994), South Korean model and actress
- Hong Suk-hwan (born 1975), South Korean cyclist
- Hong Suk-man (born 1975), South Korean athlete, Paralympic gold medalist
- Hong Sun-bo (born 1968), South Korean water polo player
- Hong Sung-chil (born 1980), South Korean archer
- Hong Sung-chon (born 1945), early proponent of Taekwondo in the Philippines
- Hong Sung-heon (born 1976), South Korean baseball player
- Hong Sung-ho (born 1954), South Korean footballer
- Dana (South Korean singer) (born Hong Sung-mi, 1986), South Korean singer
- Hong Sung-mu (born 1942), North Korean nuclear weapons scientist
- Hong Sung-sik (born 1967), South Korean retired boxer, Olympic bronze medalist
- Hong Sung-taek (born 1966), South Korean mountaineer, adventurer, explorer
- Hong Sung-won (born 1937), South Korean author
- Hong Sung-wook (born 2002), South Korean footballer
- Hong Un-jong (born 1989), North Korean artistic gymnast, Olympic gold medalist
- Waun Ki Hong (1942–2019), Korean-born American medical professor
- Jvcki Wai (born Hong Ye-eun, 1996), South Korean rapper
- Hong Ye-ji (born 2002), South Korean actress
- Hong Yeo-jin (born 1958), South Korean actress and beauty pageant titleholder
- Hong Yeong-mi (born 1968), South Korean former cyclist
- Hong Yi-sup (1914–1974), South Korean historian
- Hong Yo-seob (born 1955), South Korean actor
- Hong Yong-jo (born 1982), North Korean footballer
- Hong Yong-ok (born 1986), North Korean weightlifter
- Hong Yoo-jin (born 1989), South Korean field hockey player
- Hong Yoo-kyung (born 1994), South Korean former singer
- Hong Young-ok (born 1970), South Korean sport shooter
- Hong Young-pyo (born 1957), South Korean politician
- Hong Young-seung (born 1962), South Korean fencer
- Hong Yun-sang (born 2002), South Korean professional footballer
- Hong Yun-Sook (1925–2015), South Korean writer and poet

== See also ==
- Korean name
- List of Korean family names
- Hong (Chinese surname)
