= 2003 Tournament of the Americas squads =

This article displays the rosters for the participating teams at the 2003 Tournament of the Americas.

== Group A ==
=== Argentina ===
Argentina men's national basketball team roster
Players
Coaches

| Pos. | No. | Name | Age – Date of birth | Height | Club | Ctr. |
|---|---|---|---|---|---|---|
| G | 4 | Pepe Sánchez | 26 – 8 May 1977 | 1.92 m (6 ft 4 in) | Detroit Pistons | (United States) |
| G | 5 | Manu Ginóbili | 26 – 28 July 1977 | 1.98 m (6 ft 6 in) | San Antonio Spurs | (United States) |
| G | 6 | Alejandro Montecchia | 31 – 1 January 1972 | 1.82 m (6 ft 0 in) | Pamesa Valencia | (Spain) |
| C | 7 | Fabricio Oberto | 25 – 5 November 1977 | 2.08 m (6 ft 10 in) | San Antonio Spurs | (United States) |
| G | 8 | Lucas Victoriano | 25 – 5 November 1977 | 1.94 m (6 ft 4 in) | Real Madrid | (Spain) |
| C | 9 | Gabriel Fernández | 26 – 23 October 1976 | 2.04 m (6 ft 8 in) | Forum Valladolid | (Spain) |
| F | 10 | Leonardo Gutiérrez | 25 – 16 May 1978 | 2.00 m (6 ft 7 in) | Drac Inca Mallorca | (Spain) |
| C | 11 | Luis Scola | 23 – 30 April 1980 | 2.06 m (6 ft 9 in) | TAU Cerámica | (Spain) |
| F | 12 | Federico Kammerichs | 23 – 21 June 1980 | 2.02 m (6 ft 8 in) | Pamesa Valencia | (Spain) |
| F | 13 | Andrés Nocioni | 23 – 30 November 1979 | 2.01 m (6 ft 7 in) | TAU Cerámica | (Spain) |
| F | 14 | Leandro Palladino | 27 – 13 January 1976 | 1.95 m (6 ft 5 in) | TAU Cerámica | (Spain) |
| C | 15 | Rubén Wolkowyski | 29 – 30 September 1973 | 2.08 m (6 ft 10 in) | TAU Cerámica | (Spain) |

Head coach

- (Argentina) Rubén Magnano

Assistant coach(es)

- (Argentina) Enrique Tolcachier
- (Argentina) Fernando Duró

Legend

- Club – describes last
  club before the tournament
- Age – describes age
  on 20 August 2003

=== Canada ===
Canada men's national basketball team roster
Players
Coaches

| Pos. | No. | Name | Age – Date of birth | Height | Club | Ctr. |
|---|---|---|---|---|---|---|
| G | 4 | Novell Thomas | 27 – December 17, 1975 | 6 ft 0 in (1.83 m) | Buffalo City Thunder | (United States) |
| G | 5 | Denham Brown | 20 – January 6, 1983 | 6 ft 5 in (1.96 m) | University of Connecticut | (United States) |
| G | 6 | Prosper Karangwa | 25 – May 17, 1978 | 6 ft 7 in (2.01 m) | Adirondack Wildcats | (United States) |
| G | 7 | Steve Nash | 29 – February 7, 1974 | 6 ft 3 in (1.91 m) | Dallas Mavericks | (United States) |
| G | 8 | Shawn Swords | 29 – December 27, 1973 | 6 ft 4 in (1.93 m) | Rida Scafati | (Italy) |
| F | 9 | Rowan Barrett | 30 – November 24, 1972 | 6 ft 6 in (1.98 m) | Hapoel Haifa | (Israel) |
| G | 10 | Greg Francis | 29 – April 4, 1974 | 6 ft 3 in (1.91 m) | Chester Jets | (United Kingdom) |
| F | 11 | Andrew Kwiatkowski | 24 – January 17, 1979 | 6 ft 6 in (1.98 m) | Euro Roseto | (Italy) |
| C | 12 | Jesse Young | 23 – April 29, 1980 | 6 ft 10 in (2.08 m) | George Mason University | (United States) |
| F | 13 | Peter Guarasci | 29 – February 25, 1974 | 6 ft 9 in (2.06 m) | Crabs Rimini | (Italy) |
| F/C | 14 | Michael King | 23 – January 16, 1980 | 6 ft 8 in (2.03 m) | Wisconsin–Green Bay | (United States) |
| F | 15 | Greg Newton | 29 – July 9, 1974 | 6 ft 11 in (2.11 m) | Cherno More Port Varna | (Bulgaria) |

Head coach

- (Canada) Jay Triano

Legend

- Club – describes last
  club before the tournament
- Age – describes age
  on August 20, 2003

=== Mexico ===
Mexico men's national basketball team roster
Players
Coaches

| Pos. | No. | Name | Age – Date of birth | Height | Club | Ctr. |
|---|---|---|---|---|---|---|
| G | 4 | Óscar Castellanos | 35 – 28 April 1968 | 1.87 m (6 ft 2 in) | Soles de Jalisco | (Mexico) |
| G | 5 | Pedro Meza | 17 – 15 October 1985 | 1.86 m (6 ft 1 in) | Arizona Western College | (United States) |
| G | 6 | Anthony Pedroza | 24 – 3 July 1979 | 1.91 m (6 ft 3 in) | Marineros de Cozumel | (Mexico) |
| C | 7 | Horacio Llamas | 30 – 17 July 1973 | 2.11 m (6 ft 11 in) | Delfines de Mazatlan | (Mexico) |
| C | 8 | Omar López | 22 – 5 September 1980 | 2.03 m (6 ft 8 in) | Soles de Mexicali | (Mexico) |
| C | 9 | Jesús Benítez | 23 – 10 September 1979 | 2.10 m (6 ft 11 in) | Lobos de Saltillo | (Mexico) |
| F | 10 | Víctor Mariscal | 31 – 24 May 1972 | 2.00 m (6 ft 7 in) | Lobos de Saltillo | (Mexico) |
| G | 11 | Omar Quintero | 21 – 26 September 1981 | 1.83 m (6 ft 0 in) | Southern Nazarene University | (United States) |
| C | 12 | Víctor Ávila | 26 – 23 March 1977 | 2.09 m (6 ft 10 in) | Tijuana Tazmania Diablos | (Mexico) |
| G | 13 | Enrique Zúñiga | 27 – 7 July 1976 | 1.93 m (6 ft 4 in) | Conejos de Tuxtla | (Mexico) |
| F | 14 | Eduardo Nájera | 27 – 11 July 1976 | 2.02 m (6 ft 8 in) | Dallas Mavericks | (United States) |
| C | 15 | Adam Parada | 21 – 21 October 1981 | 2.08 m (6 ft 10 in) | UC Irvine | (United States) |

Head coach

- (Argentina) Guillermo Vecchio

Legend

- Club – describes last
  club before the tournament
- Age – describes age
  on August 20, 2003

=== Puerto Rico ===
Puerto Rico men's national basketball team roster
Players
Coaches

| Pos. | No. | Name | Age – Date of birth | Height | Club | Ctr. |
|---|---|---|---|---|---|---|
| C | 4 | José Ortiz | 39 – 25 October 1963 | 2.11 m (6 ft 11 in) | Cangrejeros de Santurce | (Puerto Rico) |
| F | 5 | Eddie Casiano | 30 – 20 September 1972 | 1.92 m (6 ft 4 in) | Leones de Ponce | (Puerto Rico) |
| G | 6 | Bobby Joe Hatton | 26 – 11 October 1976 | 1.88 m (6 ft 2 in) | Leones de Ponce | (Puerto Rico) |
| G | 7 | Carlos Arroyo | 24 – 30 July 1979 | 1.88 m (6 ft 2 in) | Utah Jazz | (United States) |
| F | 8 | Rick Apodaca | 23 – 1 July 1980 | 1.95 m (6 ft 5 in) | Capitanes de Arecibo | (Puerto Rico) |
| G | 9 | Raymond Dalmau | 29 – 23 October 1973 | 1.96 m (6 ft 5 in) | Piratas de Quebradillas | (Puerto Rico) |
| G | 10 | Elías Larry Ayuso | 26 – 27 March 1977 | 1.92 m (6 ft 4 in) | Atléticos de San Germán | (Puerto Rico) |
| F | 11 | Antonio Latimer | 24 – 26 November 1978 | 2.00 m (6 ft 7 in) | Indios de Mayagüez | (Puerto Rico) |
| F | 12 | Rolando Hourruitiner | 28 – 28 May 1975 | 2.04 m (6 ft 8 in) | Cangrejeros de Santurce | (Puerto Rico) |
| F | 13 | Sharif Fajardo | 27 – 9 June 1976 | 2.10 m (6 ft 11 in) | Atléticos de San Germán | (Puerto Rico) |
| F/C | 14 | Jorge Rivera | 29 – 9 December 1973 | 2.01 m (6 ft 7 in) | Vaqueros de Bayamón | (Puerto Rico) |
| C | 15 | Daniel Santiago | 27 – 24 June 1976 | 2.13 m (7 ft 0 in) | Milwaukee Bucks | (United States) |

Head coach

- (Puerto Rico) Julio Toro

Legend

- Club – describes last
  club before the tournament
- Age – describes age
  on August 20, 2003

=== Uruguay ===
Uruguay men's national basketball team roster
Players
Coaches

| Pos. | No. | Name | Age – Date of birth | Height | Club | Ctr. |
|---|---|---|---|---|---|---|
| F | 4 | Pablo Morales | 25 – 31 May 1978 | 2.00 m (6 ft 7 in) | Trouville | (Uruguay) |
| F | 5 | Emilio Taboada | 21 – 11 May 1982 | 1.91 m (6 ft 3 in) | Atenas | (Uruguay) |
| F | 6 | Mauricio Aguiar | 20 – 3 February 1983 | 1.99 m (6 ft 6 in) | Lauretana Biella | (Italy) |
| G | 7 | Alejandro Muro | 29 – 9 June 1974 | 1.87 m (6 ft 2 in) | Palestrina | (Italy) |
| G | 8 | Nicolás Mazzarino | 27 – 21 October 1975 | 1.84 m (6 ft 0 in) | Reggio Calabria | (Italy) |
| F | 9 | Trelonnie Owens | 31 – 25 October 1971 | 2.02 m (6 ft 8 in) | Plasencia | (Spain) |
| G | 10 | Joaquín Izuibejeres | 21 – 23 February 1982 | 1.85 m (6 ft 1 in) | Trouville | (Uruguay) |
| C | 11 | Gastón Paez | 23 – 22 September 1979 | 2.08 m (6 ft 10 in) | Welcome | (Uruguay) |
| C | 12 | Gustavo Szczygielski | 35 – 28 September 1967 | 2.04 m (6 ft 8 in) | Defensor Sporting | (Uruguay) |
| G | 13 | Luis Silveira | 32 – 16 January 1971 | 1.85 m (6 ft 1 in) | Defensor Sporting | (Uruguay) |
| C | 14 | Marcel Bouzot | 32 – 2 March 1971 | 2.06 m (6 ft 9 in) | Círculo Badajoz | (Spain) |
| C | 15 | Esteban Batista | 19 – 2 September 1983 | 2.08 m (6 ft 10 in) | Welcome | (Uruguay) |

Head coach

- (Argentina) Néstor García

Legend

- Club – describes last
  club before the tournament
- Age – describes age
  on August 20, 2003

== Group B ==
=== Brazil ===
Brazil men's national basketball team roster
Players
Coaches

| Pos. | No. | Name | Age – Date of birth | Height | Club | Ctr. |
|---|---|---|---|---|---|---|
| G | 4 | Marcelinho Machado | 28 – 12 April 1975 | 2.00 m (6 ft 7 in) | Rimini Crabs | (Italy) |
| F | 5 | Renato Pinto | 25 – 28 May 1978 | 2.03 m (6 ft 8 in) | COC-Ribeirão Preto | (Brazil) |
| C | 6 | Murilo Da Rosa | 20 – 14 July 1983 | 2.07 m (6 ft 9 in) | Bauru | (Brazil) |
| G | 7 | Válter da Silva | 26 – 31 January 1977 | 1.86 m (6 ft 1 in) | Unitri/Uberlândia | (Brazil) |
| G | 8 | Leandro Barbosa | 20 – 28 November 1982 | 1.94 m (6 ft 4 in) | Bauru | (Brazil) |
| G | 9 | Demétrius Ferraciú | 30 – 17 July 1973 | 1.93 m (6 ft 4 in) | Minas Tênis Clube | (Brazil) |
| F | 10 | Alex Garcia | 23 – 4 March 1980 | 1.92 m (6 ft 4 in) | COC-Ribeirão Preto | (Brazil) |
| C | 11 | Anderson Varejão | 20 – 28 September 1982 | 2.11 m (6 ft 11 in) | FC Barcelona | (Spain) |
| F | 12 | Guilherme Giovannoni | 23 – 2 June 1980 | 2.08 m (6 ft 10 in) | Rimini Crabs | (Italy) |
| C | 13 | Nenê | 20 – 13 September 1982 | 2.11 m (6 ft 11 in) | Denver Nuggets | (United States) |
| C | 14 | Luis Fernando De Souza | 25 – 5 January 1978 | 2.10 m (6 ft 11 in) | Minas Tênis Clube | (Brazil) |
| F | 15 | Tiago Splitter | 18 – 1 January 1985 | 2.11 m (6 ft 11 in) | Bilbao Basket | (Spain) |

Head coach

- (Brazil) Lula Ferreira

Legend

- Club – describes last
  club before the tournament
- Age – describes age
  on August 20, 2003

=== Dominican Republic ===
Dominican Republic men's national basketball team roster
Players
Coaches

| Pos. | No. | Name | Age – Date of birth | Height | Club | Ctr. |
|---|---|---|---|---|---|---|
| G | 4 | Otto Ramírez | 28 – 14 November 1974 | 1.80 m (5 ft 11 in) |
| F | 5 | Carlos Paniagua | 27 – 9 April 1976 | 2.02 m (6 ft 8 in) | Mauricio Báez | (Dominican Republic) |
| F | 6 | Henry Lalane | 25 – 3 March 1978 | 2.00 m (6 ft 7 in) | Calero de Villa Duarte | (Dominican Republic) |
| G | 7 | Carlos Morban | 21 – 5 April 1982 | 1.89 m (6 ft 2 in) | Florida International University | (United States) |
| F | 8 | Henry Paulino | 29 – 29 December 1973 | 1.98 m (6 ft 6 in) | Mauricio Báez | (Dominican Republic) |
| F | 9 | Franklin Western | 31 – 11 April 1972 | 2.00 m (6 ft 7 in) | Vaqueros de Bayamón | (Puerto Rico) |
| C | 10 | Miguel Angel Pichardo | 23 – 8 February 1980 | 2.00 m (6 ft 7 in) | CAB Madeira | (Portugal) |
| G/F | 11 | Carlos Payano | 32 – 6 February 1971 | 1.95 m (6 ft 5 in) | Vaqueros de Bayamón | (Puerto Rico) |
| C | 12 | José Vargas | 40 – 23 June 1963 | 2.07 m (6 ft 9 in) | Guaros de Lara | (Venezuela) |
| C | 13 | Amaury Filion | 22 – 1 August 1981 | 2.06 m (6 ft 9 in) | JA Vichy | (France) |
| G | 14 | Richard Ortega | 21 – 24 December 1981 | 1.78 m (5 ft 10 in) | CPN Pueblo Nuevo | (Dominican Republic) |
| C | 15 | Jaime Peterson | 31 – 29 September 1971 | 2.07 m (6 ft 9 in) | CD Universidad Complutense | (Spain) |

Head coach

- (Dominican Republic) Héctor Báez

Legend

- Club – describes last
  club before the tournament
- Age – describes age
  on August 20, 2003

=== United States ===
United States men's national basketball team roster
Players
Coaches

| Pos. | No. | Name | Age – Date of birth | Height | Club | Ctr. |
|---|---|---|---|---|---|---|
| G | 4 | Allen Iverson | 28 – 7 June 1975 | 6 ft 0 in (1.83 m) | Philadelphia 76ers | (United States) |
| G | 5 | Jason Kidd | 30 – 23 March 1973 | 6 ft 4 in (1.93 m) | New Jersey Nets | (United States) |
| G/F | 6 | Tracy McGrady | 24 – 24 May 1979 | 6 ft 7 in (2.01 m) | Orlando Magic | (United States) |
| C | 7 | Jermaine O'Neal | 24 – 13 October 1978 | 6 ft 11 in (2.11 m) | Indiana Pacers | (United States) |
| G | 8 | Vince Carter | 26 – 26 January 1977 | 6 ft 5 in (1.96 m) | Toronto Raptors | (Canada) |
| F | 9 | Nick Collison | 22 – 26 October 1980 | 6 ft 9 in (2.06 m) | Seattle SuperSonics | (United States) |
| G | 10 | Mike Bibby | 25 – 13 May 1978 | 6 ft 1 in (1.85 m) | Sacramento Kings | (United States) |
| F | 11 | Kenyon Martin | 25 – 30 December 1977 | 6 ft 9 in (2.06 m) | New Jersey Nets | (United States) |
| G | 12 | Ray Allen | 28 – 20 July 1975 | 6 ft 4 in (1.93 m) | Seattle SuperSonics | (United States) |
| F | 13 | Tim Duncan | 27 – 25 April 1976 | 6 ft 11 in (2.11 m) | San Antonio Spurs | (United States) |
| F | 14 | Elton Brand | 24 – 11 March 1979 | 6 ft 8 in (2.03 m) | Los Angeles Clippers | (United States) |
| F | 15 | Richard Jefferson | 23 – 21 June 1980 | 6 ft 8 in (2.03 m) | New Jersey Nets | (United States) |

Head coach

- (United States) Larry Brown

Assistant coach(es)

- (United States) Gregg Popovich
- (United States) Roy Williams
- (United States) Oliver Purnell

Legend

- Club – describes last
  club before the tournament
- Age – describes age
  on August 20, 2003

=== Venezuela ===
Venezuela men's national basketball team roster
Players
Coaches

| Pos. | No. | Name | Age – Date of birth | Height | Club | Ctr. |
|---|---|---|---|---|---|---|
| F | 4 | Víctor Díaz | 35 – 2 April 1968 | 1.98 m (6 ft 6 in) | Delfines de Miranda | (Venezuela) |
| F | 5 | Luis Julio | 23 – 12 June 1980 | 1.96 m (6 ft 5 in) | Gaiteros del Zulia | (Venezuela) |
| G | 6 | Ernesto Mijares | 26 – 30 September 1976 | 1.91 m (6 ft 3 in) | Marinos de Anzoátegui | (Venezuela) |
| G | 7 | Rafael Guevara | 24 – 2 May 1979 | 1.90 m (6 ft 3 in) | Gaiteros de Zulia | (Venezuela) |
| F/C | 8 | Tomás Aguilera | 25 – 25 September 1977 | 1.97 m (6 ft 6 in) | Marinos de Anzoátegui | (Venezuela) |
| G | 9 | Óscar Torres | 26 – 18 December 1976 | 1.98 m (6 ft 6 in) | Pompea Napoli | (Italy) |
| G | 10 | Diego Guevara | 26 – 10 February 1977 | 1.86 m (6 ft 1 in) | Trotamundos de Carabobo | (Venezuela) |
| C | 11 | Miguel Ángel Marriaga | 19 – 6 June 1984 | 2.06 m (6 ft 9 in) | Gaiteros de Zulia | (Venezuela) |
| C | 12 | Heberth Bayona | 25 – 26 April 1978 | 2.11 m (6 ft 11 in) | Guaros de Lara | (Venezuela) |
| C | 13 | Roque Osorio | 27 – 24 January 1976 | 2.05 m (6 ft 9 in) | Trotamundos de Carabobo | (Venezuela) |
| C | 14 | Rosmel Blanco | 26 – 11 September 1976 | 2.07 m (6 ft 9 in) | Trotamundos de Carabobo | (Venezuela) |
| G/F | 15 | Carlos Morris | 27 – 10 November 1975 | 1.95 m (6 ft 5 in) | Toros de Aragua | (Venezuela) |

Head coach

- (Venezuela) Néstor Salazar

Legend

- Club – describes last
  club before the tournament
- Age – describes age
  on August 20, 2003

=== Virgin Islands ===
Virgin Islands men's national basketball team roster
Players
Coaches

| Pos. | No. | Name | Age – Date of birth | Height | Club | Ctr. |
|---|---|---|---|---|---|---|
| G | 4 | Vernal Maynard | 22 – April 30, 1981 | 6 ft 1 in (1.85 m) | Winston-Salem State University | (United States) |
| G | 5 | Kevin Sheppard | 23 – September 17, 1979 | 6 ft 0 in (1.83 m) | Jacksonville University | (United States) |
| G | 6 | Marcus Oliver | 22 – October 20, 1980 | 6 ft 3 in (1.91 m) | University of Houston | (United States) |
| F | 7 | Cuthbert Victor | 20 – January 30, 1983 | 6 ft 6 in (1.98 m) | Murray State University | (United States) |
| C | 8 | Ja Ja Richards | 28 – November 19, 1974 | 6 ft 10 in (2.08 m) | Maratonistas de Coamo | (Puerto Rico) |
| G/F | 9 | Calvert White | 27 – December 7, 1975 | 6 ft 3 in (1.91 m) | All Eyez On We | (United States Virgin Islands) |
| F | 10 | Roal Caesar | 21 – August 20, 1982 | 6 ft 6 in (1.98 m) | Indiana University Southeast | (United States) |
| G/F | 11 | Keylen Gregory | 16 – October 30, 1986 | 6 ft 3 in (1.91 m) | Antilles School | (United States Virgin Islands) |
| F | 12 | Leon Trimmingham | 32 – February 1, 1971 | 6 ft 7 in (2.01 m) | Seoul SK Knights | (South Korea) |
| F | 13 | Jamel Heywood | 26 – March 19, 1977 | 6 ft 5 in (1.96 m) | Gallitos de Isabela | (Puerto Rico) |
| C | 14 | Omari Peterkin | 19 – December 29, 1983 | 6 ft 7 in (2.01 m) | University of Notre Dame | (United States) |
| F | 15 | Sylvester Charles | 41 – February 11, 1962 | 6 ft 8 in (2.03 m) |

Head coach

- (United States) Tevester Anderson

Legend

- nat field describes country
  of last club
  before the tournament
- Age field is age on August 20, 2003
