= 368 Haidea =

Main-belt asteroid

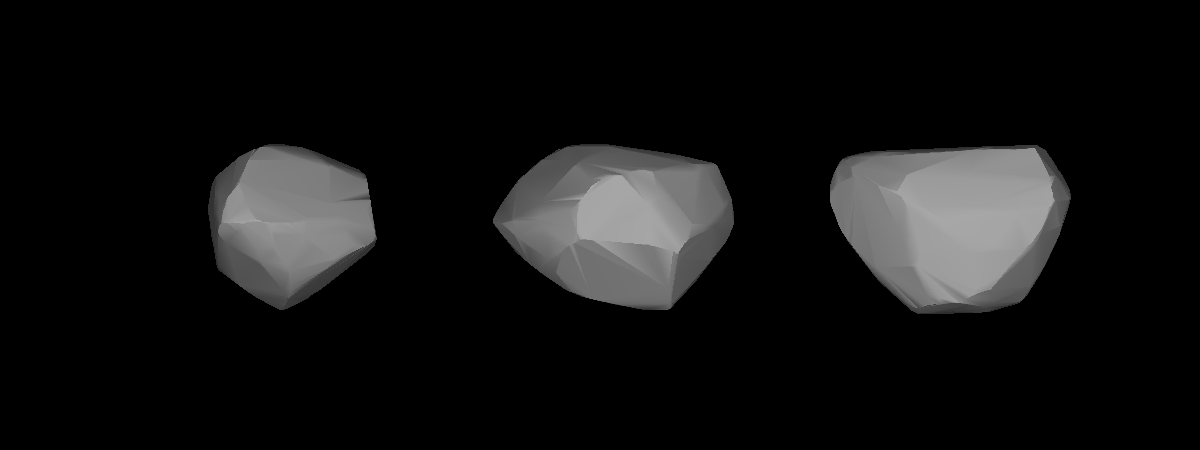
- Lightcurve-base 3D-model of 368 Haidea.

Discovery
- Discovered by: Auguste Charlois
- Discovery date: 19 May 1893

Designations
- Pronunciation
- Alternative designations: 1893 AB
- Minor planet category: Main belt

Orbital characteristics
- Epoch 31 July 2016 (JD 2457600.5)
- Uncertainty parameter 0
- Observation arc: 110.46 yr (40344 d)
- Aphelion: 3.6914 AU (552.23 Gm)
- Perihelion: 2.4594 AU (367.92 Gm)
- Semi-major axis: 3.0754 AU (460.07 Gm)
- Eccentricity: 0.20031
- Orbital period (sidereal): 5.39 yr (1969.9 d)
- Mean anomaly: 270.180°
- Mean motion: 0° 10^{m} 57.9^{s} / day
- Inclination: 7.7935°
- Longitude of ascending node: 226.340°
- Argument of perihelion: 94.934°

Physical characteristics
- Dimensions: 69.61±2.2 km
- Synodic rotation period: 9.823 h (0.4093 d)
- Geometric albedo: 0.0389±0.003
- Spectral type: PD
- Absolute magnitude (H): 9.93

368 Haidea is a large asteroid residing in the asteroid belt. It was discovered by Auguste Charlois on 19 May 1893 in Nice.

Its name meaning is not known; it may be taken from the opera Haydée or one of several fictional characters named Haidée. The Tagish Lake meteorite is believed to derive from 368 Haidea, due to its reflectance spectrum.
