= María Zamora =

María Zamora may refer to:

- María Zamora (softball)
- María Zamora (producer)
- María Zamora (Cuban sprinter)
- María Zamora (Mexican sprinter)
