= Haydée (disambiguation) =

Haydée is an opéra comique by Daniel Auber.

Haydée may also refer to:

- Haydée, an opera by Felicita Casella
- Haidee, a character associated with the legendary lover Don Juan
  - Haidée, a major figure in Byron's poem Don Juan
- Haydée, a character from The Count of Monte Cristo
- Haydée, a character in La Collectionneuse
- Haydee, a 2016 video game by Haydee Interactive LLC.

== People with the given name ==
- Haydée Tamara Bunke Bider (1937–1967), better known as Tania or Tania the Guerrilla, communist revolutionary and spy in Cuba and Bolivia
- Haydée Coloso-Espino (1937–2021), Filipino swimmer
- Haidee Granger, television producer, writer, executive, and media consultant
- Haydée Hernández (born 1966), Cuban softball player
- Haydée Padilla (1936-2022), Argentine actress
- Haydée Santamaría (1923–1980), Cuban revolutionary
- Haydée Mercedes Sosa (1935–2009), known as La Negra, Argentine singer
- Haidee Tiffen (born 1979), New Zealand former cricketer
- Haydee Yorac (1941–2005), Filipino public servant, law professor and politician
- Haydée Verane Pinto Pereira da Silva Araújo (born 1985), Angolan/Portuguese sociologist

== People with the surname ==
- Marcia Haydée (born 1937), prima ballerina and ballet director

== See also ==
- Heidi (given name)
