= Luis Silveira =

Luis Silveira may refer to:

- Luis Silveira (basketball) (born 1971), Uruguayan basketball player
- Luis Silveira (handballer) (born 1973), Cuban handball player
