= Park Seong-rip =

South Korean handball player (born 1973)

Personal information
- Nationality: South Korean
- Born: 18 September 1973 (age 51)

Sport
- Sport: Handball

Park Seong-rip (born 18 September 1973) is a South Korean handball player.

== Professional career ==
He competed in the Men's Tournament at the 2000 Summer Olympics.
