= Yamila Degrase =

Cuban softball player

Personal information
- Nationality: Cuban
- Born: 29 April 1974 (age 50)

Sport
- Sport: Softball

Yamila Degrase (born 29 April 1974) is a Cuban softball player. She competed in the women's tournament at the 2000 Summer Olympics.
