= José Hernández (handballer) =

Cuban handball player (born 1979)

Personal information
- Nationality: Cuban
- Born: 16 January 1979 (age 46)

Sport
- Sport: Handball

José Hernández (born 16 January 1979) is a Cuban handball player. He competed in the men's tournament at the 2000 Summer Olympics.
