= Uroš Šerbec =

Slovenian handball player

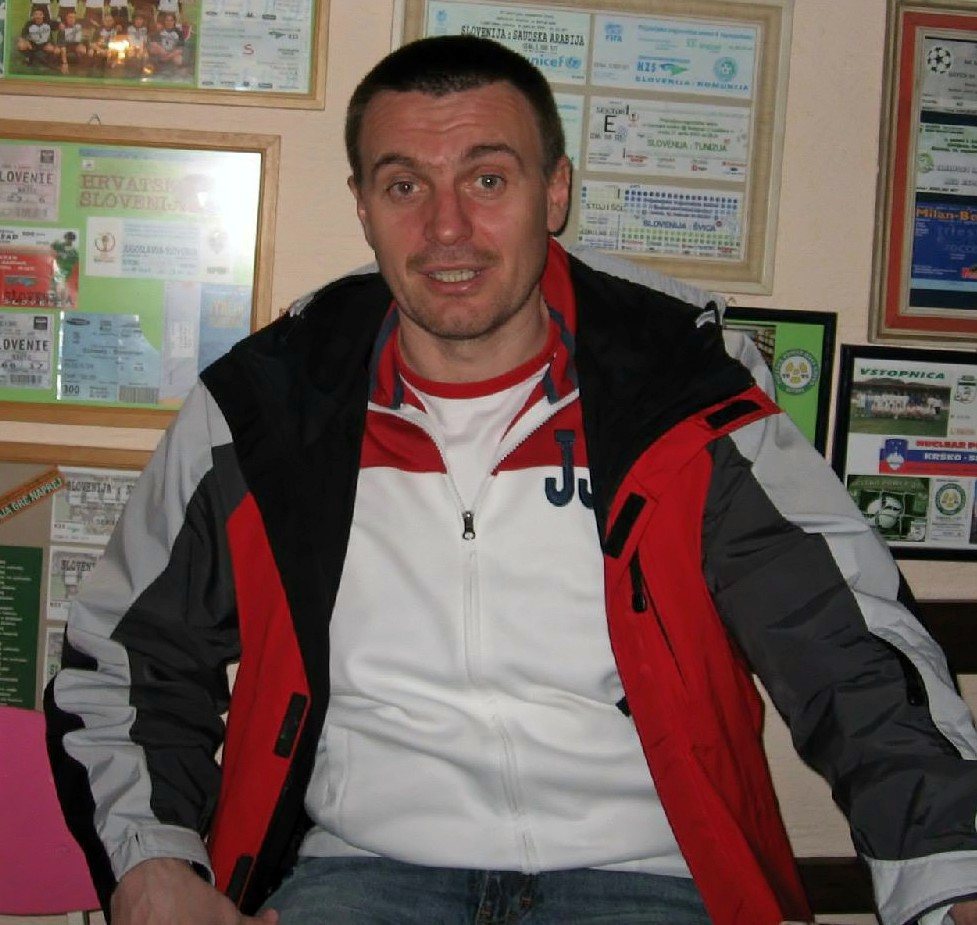
- Uroš Šerbec in 2014

Personal information
- Nationality: Slovenian
- Born: 15 February 1968 (age 57); Celje, Yugoslavia

Sport
- Sport: Handball

Uroš Šerbec (born 15 February 1968) is a Slovenian handball player. He competed in the men's tournament at the 2000 Summer Olympics.
