= Laritza Espinosa =

Cuban softball player

Personal information
- Nationality: Cuban
- Born: 27 January 1973 (age 52)

Sport
- Sport: Softball

Laritza Espinosa (born 27 January 1973) is a Cuban softball player. She competed in the women's tournament at the 2000 Summer Olympics.
