= Hong Yi-sup =

South Korean historian (1917–1974)

- Born: December 6, 1914; Keijō, Keiki-dō, Korea, Empire of Japan
- Died: March 4, 1974 (aged 59)
- Occupations: scholar, critic, writer

Academic background
- Education: Yonsei University

Academic work
- Main interests: Korean history, History of Silhak

Korean name
- Hangul: 홍이섭
- Hanja: 洪以燮
- RR: Hong Iseop
- MR: Hong Isŏp
- IPA: [hoŋ.i.sʌp̚]

Hong Yi-sup (Korean: 홍이섭; Hanja: 洪以燮; Korean pronunciation: [hoŋ.i.sʌp̚]; December 6, 1914 – March 4, 1974) was a South Korean historian. Hong contributed to studies on Korean history, the history of Silhak, and the intellectual history of Korea.

One of his notable books is The History of Science in Joseon (조선과학사, 1944), which is the first book to provide a comprehensive overview of the Joseon period's scientific advances. It was first published in the Japanese language in Tokyo, Japan, in 1944. The History of Science in Joseon was later translated into Korean and published by Jeongeumsa (정음사) in 1946. Hong is also known for his book, History of Korea (1970), which was written collaboratively with Pow-key Sohn and Chol-choon Kim and funded by the Korean National Commission for the United Nations Educational, Scientific and Cultural Organization (UNESCO). This book has been widely used as a comprehensive source for studying Korean history around the world. Hong later translated History of Korea (1970) into Korean and later published Korean Modern History (한국근대사, 1975).

Hong contributed to diverse areas of Korean history during the colonial period through his research. He established a foundation for the studies of the history of Korean science and provided a new perspective that helped overcome the misrepresented history of Korean that stemmed from the Japanese colonial period. Through his works, he wanted to depict the true Korean history to the public that resisted the colonial Japanese gaze and criticized the distorted history of Korea written by Japan, which justified Japanese colonialism in Korea.

== Life ==
Hong Yi-sup was born in Keijō (Seoul), Korea, Empire of Japan on December 6, 1914. He graduated from Seoul Geumhwa Elementary School (금화보통학교) in 1929 and from Paichai High School (배재고등보통학교) in 1933. He served as a teacher at the School of YMCA after graduating from Yonhi College (later Yonsei University) in 1938. After the National Liberation Day of Korea on August 15, 1945, he served as a professor in the Humanities department at Korea University from 1949 to 1954 and served as a Humanities Professor at Yonsei University from 1953 to 1974. During his years at Yonsei University, he assumed the position of department chair in both the History and Humanities departments. He also worked as the director of Eastern studies and the director of publishing. He received his doctoral degree in Korean Literature at Yonsei University in 1966 and continued to serve as a professor there. He died on March 4, 1974, of carbon monoxide poisoning at the age of 61.

== Career ==
- 1949, Member of the Academic Subcommittee of Seoul Metropolitan City Culture Committee (서울특별시 문화위원회 학술부위원).
- 1951, Editor of the War History Compilation in the Korea Navy Council (해군본부 전사편찬실편수관).
- 1952, President of the Korean Historical Association (역사학회회장).
- 1952, Examiner for the Examination Committee (고시위원회 보통고시위원).
- 1955, Member of the National History Compilation Committee of the Ministry of Education (문교부 국사편찬위원회위원).
- 1956, Member of the Korean National Commission for UNESCO(국제연합교육과학문화기구(UNESCO) 한국위원회위원).
- 1956, Researcher of national thought (국민사상연구원 전문위원회위원).
- 1958, Examiner for the Korean bar exam (사법고등고시위원).
- 1965, Board member of the Institute for the Translation of Korean Classics (민족문화추진위원회 이사).
- 1965, Board member of YMCA (대한기독교청년회연맹(YMCA) 이사).
- 1965, Member of the National Culture Council (민족문화협의회위원).
- 1969, Member of the Culture Heritage Conservation Committee in the Ministry of Culture and Public Information (문화공보부 문화재보존위원회위원).
- 1969, Member of the Committee for Compilation of Independence Movement History in the Ministry of Patriots and Veterans Affairs (원호처 독립운동사편찬위원회위원).
- 1970, President of the South Korea Foundation Oesolhoe (재단법인 외솔회 회장).
- 1971, Executive director of the King Sejong Commemoration Enterprise Council (세종대왕기념사업회 상임이사).

== Published Works ==
- The History of Science in Joseon (조선과학사(朝鮮科學史), 1944)
- The Comparative Chart Between Joseon History and World History (세계사와 대조한 조선사 도해표, 1946)
- Korean Maritime History (한국해양사(韓國海洋史) (Coauthored), 1955)
- Study on Yak-yong Jeong's Political and Economy Thought (정약용의 정치∙경제사상연구, 1959)
- Methodology of Korean History (한국사의 방법, 1968)
- The History of Korea (Coauthored; 1970)
- Biography of King Sejong the Great (세종대왕 전기, 1971)
- Korea's Self—Identity (1973)
- Korean Modern History (한국근대사, 1975)
- Introduction to the Intellectual History of Korea (한국정신사 서설, 1975)

== Achievements ==
=== A Study on the History of Joseon ===
Hong is best known for his work, The History of Science in Joseon (조선과학사, 1944). The book provides an extensive history of Korean traditional science. His work established the foundation for studies on Korean science history. It contributed to research and development in Korean science history. Hong wrote The History of Science in Joseon for several reasons. First, its topic could not only evade the censorship of Japan during the colonial period but also show pride in Korea's national history. Second, he believed it was crucial to focus on the development and transition process in people's lives and the social structures central to the development and transition of science in Korea. Third, he regarded learning the spirit of science, in the history of science, as significant in establishing the national spirit of Korea.

The History of Science in Joseon is considered a valuable resource for the study of the history of Korean science. Before its publication, there was no existing research by Korean scholars on the history of Korean science; instead, missionaries from the West or Japanese scholars researched the subject. Hong created the foundational system of Korean science history by dividing the timeline into six historical periods to depict the critical progress of how science developed in history: the Prehistoric period (선사시대), Three Kingdoms dynasty (삼국시대), United Silla dynasty (통일신라시대), Goryeo dynasty (고려시대), early Joseon (조선 초기), and Yeong-Jeong dynasty (영정시대). Hong highlighted that the fourth period, the Goryeo dynasty, was the most significant since Korea's relationship with Song (Imperial dynasty of China) dissolved during this period. As a result, they had to reexamine Chinese science and technology on their own terms. Hong also thought the Joseon period was also critical in science history. During the Sejong Dynasty, bureaucracy and sovereignty reorganized science in early Joseon. Moreover, during the Joseon period, the influx of Cheong dynasty (Imperial dynasty of China) culture influenced Joseon to reorganize science and technology in the palace. Furthermore, the study of positivism (실증학) that the school of empiricism (실사구시학파) pursued introduced Western science in Joseon. Thus, by analyzing the historical development of science, Hong redefined Korean science in terms of its relation with foreign knowledge.

=== A Study about Yak-yong Jeong ===
Hong focused on the economic thought of Yak-yong Jeong. His interest in this area was rooted in his concern for the uncertain reality of the colonial period of Korea in the 1930s. His book, Study on the Politics and Economic Thought of Yak-yong Jeong, deals with Yak-yong Jeong's governing thoughts (경세사상) because Hong believed understanding economic thought is necessary for establishing the new nation. In his book, Hong analyzes and examines thecomposition process and fundamental ideas of Yak-yong Jeong's works, Kyungseyupyo (경세유표) and Mongminsimseo (목민심서). Kyunseyupyo is about reform plans for the nation's politics, society, and economy. Mongminsimseo is a guideline for local officials to govern the people. On the basis of Kyungseyupyo and Mongminsimseo, he comprehensively addresses the function of politics and the economy during the late Joseon period. Moreover, he investigates the reform plan for establishing the government and stabilizing the agriculture economy. He also scrutinizes the administration method that criticizes and eliminates the swindling acts of peasants hindering the agricultural economy in the provinces. Hong's book is considered to have contributed to studies about Jeong and the thought of practical science in the late Joseon period.

=== The Establishment of a National Historical Perspective to Combat Japan's Historical Distortion on Korea ===
Hong endeavored to establish a national historical perspective that rejected the Japanese colonial interpretation of history. He emphasized the significance of reading the materials on 20th century Korean history recorded by Japan with a critical viewpoint. Hong realized that since the 20th century, Japan has distorted Chinese and Korean history to justify the invasion and colonization of Manchu and Korea. By fabricating the history of the two nations, Japan strengthened the perspective that China and Korea were dependent on Japan and regressive, which solidified their colonial historical perspective through the distortion of histories. Hong introduced alternative methods to present a national historical perspective. His methodology stressed the following two aspects. Firstly, he emphasized that analyzing and criticizing the formation, compilation, and publishing of literature according to the social context is crucial in historical criticism. Secondly, he highlighted the need for criticism regarding the mind of the writer, the historical context, the division of nation, ethnicity, and the psychological relationship and verbal issues between the dominant and the subordinate. He deemed these factors essential for establishing a national historical perspective because he thought research without criticism on such elements would be imbued with a Japanese colonial historical perspective.

=== A Study of Thought and History from the 1920s through Korean Literature ===
Hong facilitated research on the history of Korea under Japanese rule. He studied how Korean writers during the Japanese colonization period reproduced their ideas in their works by analyzing Korean literary works by analyzing Korean literary works by Yong-un Han, Seo-hye Choi, Man-sik Chae, and Hoon Shim. In those days, examining history through literary works was a new attempt. He used the new approach to identify the historical context and trace how the writer lived in that milieu. He focused on ethnic poverty in the colonial period, especially the lives of the agricultural community and farmers, represented in the works of Sang-seop Yeom, Seo-hye Choi, Man-sik Chae, and Hoon Shim. He reexamined these works within the colonial context by comparing the life of the rural people to that of the Korean intellectuals in the 1920s to 1930s. His research functioned as literary criticism and was evaluated as meaningful, in that it tried to study the colonial reality and social consciousness inherent in the lives of the people.

=== A Study on the History of Korea ===
Hong's book, Korean Modern History (한국근대사) was published in 1975 after his death. It was collaboratively written by Professor Pow-key Sohn (손보기), of Yonsei University, and Professor Chol-choon Kim (김철준), of Seoul National University. The authors wanted to provide an accurate description of Korean history that was not distorted by the viewpoint of Japan and Japanese propaganda. They aimed to make the book interpretative and approachable to overseas readers, using a functional approach to translating Korean terminology, thereby better describing the shifts and currents of historical development. The book was written to explore the authentic and comprehensive landscape of the history of Korea and to rectify the errors of some of the books on Korean history published overseas at the time. The Korean National Commission for UNESCO financially funded and published it. An English-translated version, The History of Korea, was translated by Pow-key Sohn, Myong-chol Kim, and Hui-chang Kim, and published in 1970.

== Criticism ==
Hong views Silhak, a Korean Confucian social movement, not as a scholarship that broke away from feudalism but as a scholarship that tried to maintain the Joseon feudal society. Do-hyung Kim, a professor of Korean History at Yonsei University, criticizes Hong's research on Silhak and Yak-yong Jeong's thoughts, noting that the reformative aspect of Silhak is neglected. Kim claims that Hong overlooked the reformative and modern aspects of Silhak as a medieval times system due to the lack of development in the research of social economy history back then. Moreover, Ho Yeon Kim, an HK (Humanities Korea) research professor at Kangwon University, acknowledges that Hong has contributed to comprehensive research on science history and his methodology of using Marx's historical materialism helps describe the correlation between social structure and science and technology. However, Kim argues that analyzing the history of science using Marx's historical materialism does not describe the development of science. Kim emphasizes that examining the development of science and its influence on people and society is significant in science history research.
