= Vilma Álvarez =

Cuban softball player (born 1970)

Personal information
- Born: 10 April 1970 (age 55) Bayamo, Cuba

Sport
- Sport: Softball

Vilma Álvarez Góngora (born 10 April 1970) is a Cuban softball player. She competed in the women's tournament at the 2000 Summer Olympics.
