= Juan González (handballer) =

Cuban handball player (born 1974)

Personal information
- Nationality: Cuban
- Born: 24 July 1974 (age 50)

Sport
- Sport: Handball

Juan González (born 24 July 1974) is a Cuban handball player. He competed in the men's tournament at the 2000 Summer Olympics.
