= Félix Romero =

Cuban handball player (born 1972)

Personal information
- Nationality: Cuban
- Born: 26 February 1972 (age 53)

Sport
- Sport: Handball

Félix Romero (born 26 February 1972) is a Cuban handball player. He competed in the men's tournament at the 2000 Summer Olympics.
