= Yarisleidis Peña =

Cuban softball player

Personal information
- Born: 10 February 1979 (age 46); Bartolomé Masó, Cuba

Sport
- Sport: Softball

Yarisleidis Peña (born 10 February 1979) is a Cuban softball player. She competed in the women's tournament at the 2000 Summer Olympics.
