= Miguel Montes (handballer) =

Cuban handball player (born 1972)

Personal information
- Nationality: Cuban
- Born: 25 December 1972 (age 52)

Sport
- Sport: Handball

Miguel Montes (born 25 December 1972) is a Cuban handball player. He competed in the men's tournament at the 2000 Summer Olympics.
