= Hong Gi-il =

South Korean handball player (born 1974)

Personal information
- Nationality: South Korean
- Born: 21 April 1974 (age 50)

Sport
- Sport: Handball

Hong Gi-il (born 21 April 1974) is a South Korean handball player. He competed in the men's tournament at the 2000 Summer Olympics.
