= Misael Iglesias =

Cuban handball player (born 1977)

Personal information
- Nationality: Cuban
- Born: 23 July 1977 (age 49)

Sport
- Sport: Handball

Misael Iglesias (born 23 July 1977) is a Cuban handball player. He competed in the men's tournament at the 2000 Summer Olympics.
