= Damian Cuesta =

Cuban handball player (born 1978)

Personal information
- Nationality: Cuban
- Born: 13 June 1978 (age 46)

Sport
- Sport: Handball

Damian Cuesta (born 13 June 1978) is a Cuban handball player. He competed in the men's tournament at the 2000 Summer Olympics.
