= Óscar Castellanos (basketball) =

Mexican basketball player (born 1968)

Abejas de León (women)
- Position: Assistant coach
- League: LNBPF

Personal information
- Born: 28 April 1968 (age 58) Guadalajara, Jalisco, Mexico
- Listed height: 6 ft 1 in (1.85 m)
- Listed weight: 185 lb (84 kg)

Career information
- College: University of Guadalajara

Career history

Playing
- 1988–1992: Leones Negros de la UdeG
- 1993–1996: Correbasket UAT
- 1996–1997: Report Suzano
- 1996–1997: Carrefour Santo André
- 2000–2003: Soles de Jalisco
- 2003–2005: Jaguares de Chiapas
- 2005–2011: Halcones Rojos Veracruz

Coaching
- 2012–2016: Halcones Rojos Veracruz (Assistant)
- 2017–2020: Borregos Salvajes Guadalajara
- 2020: Gigantes de Jalisco
- 2021–2023: Borregos Salvajes Guadalajara
- 2024: Abejas de León (women)
- 2025: Rojas de Veracruz
- 2026–: Abejas de León (women) (assistant)

Oscar Arturo Castellanos García (born 28 April 1968) is a Mexican former professional basketball player and current head coach of Rojas de Veracruz.

== Career ==
Castellanos made his debut in 1988 season with the Leones Negros de la UdeG to play in the CIMEBA. He also played in the Halcones Rojos Veracruz of the LNBP.

== Coaching career ==
He started his coaching career in 2012 with Halcones Rojos Veracruz as assistant. He joined the coaching staff of Borregos Salvajes Guadalajara in 2017. In 2024 he signed as head coach of Abejas de León of the Liga Nacional de Baloncesto Profesional Femenil. In 2025 he was announced as head coach of Rojas de Veracruz.
