= Hong Sung-won =

- Born: December 26, 1937; Hapcheon County, Korea, Empire of Japan
- Died: 2008 (aged 70–71)
- Citizenship: South Korean
- Writing career
- Language: Korean

- Hong Sung-won
- Hangul: 홍성원
- Hanja: 洪盛原
- RR: Hong Seongwon
- MR: Hong Sŏngwŏn

Hong Sung-won (Korean: 홍성원; born December 26, 1937) was a Korean author.

== Life ==
Hong Sung-won was born in 1937, in Hapcheon County, Keishōnan-dō, Korea, Empire of Japan. The oldest of eight siblings, Hong Sung-won studied English literature at Korea University, but was forced to drop out for financial reasons. The three years he spent at the Gwangwon-do military base from 1961 made an enormous impact on his writing; this experience was responsible for developing his “hardboiled Korean fiction.” Hong Sung-won died from stomach cancer in May 2008. He is survived by his two daughters, Hong Jina and Hong Jaram, who write for TV and are responsible for such works as Round Off and Beethoven Virus.

== Work ==
In 1961 before Hong enlisted in the military, his short story War won The Dong-a Ilbo’s spring literary contest. The year 1964 proved to be an even more fruitful year for Hong. In January, his story Freezing Point Period, which was based on his experience in the military, was the winning entry in the Hankook Ilbo’s literary contest. In August of the same year, he won a literary contest sponsored by Saedae (Generation) with his story “The Train and Calf,” and in December he won the Dong-a Ilbo Novel Contest with D-Day’s Barracks. The themes of Hong's early works tend to about the destructive relationships and violence of power within a military unit, as well as the brutality of war. From 1970, his representative novel June 25, a work that deals with the military and the Korean War, was serialized in the magazine Saedae for five years. It was later published as North and South. By his own account, this work was personally difficult to continue, with Korea still split.

Another defining feature of Hong's work is his focus on the ruthless practices that take place in the urban landscape. He is deeply concerned about those who attempt to escape from a structured society because they cannot adapt to present-day reality. Works published in the 1960s, such as A Vagabond Journey, Weekend Trip, and A Stranger’s Arena, fall into this category. In the 70s, Hong concentrated his energies on his major work North and South. In the 80s, he struggled to bring large-scale historical dramas to life. The Moon and Knife is about the 16th century Japanese invasion of Korea; Dawn is about the political upheavals (including the March 1st Movement) that took place in the beginning of the 20th century; and However is about the life of a pro-independence fighter who opposed colonialist Japanese rule but ultimately defected. Dawn, which dramatizes the tumultuous changes in recent history, is considered a masterpiece and was made into a TV drama in 1993.

== Awards ==
- Dong-a Ilbo's spring literary contest (1961)
- Hankook Ilbo's literary contest (1964)
- Dong-a Ilbo Novel Contest (1964)
- Hyeondae Literary Award for his 1985 novel The Last Idol
- Isan Literary Award for Dawn.

== Works in Translation ==
- されど (그러나)
- 恭敬的暴力 (성원 소설선)

== Works in Korean (Partial) ==
Novels

- Shaking Land (1978)
- Dawn: Vol. 1-6 (1992)
- However: Vol. 1-2 (1996)
- North and South: Vol 1-6 (1987; 2000)
- The Last Idol (1985; 2005)
- The Moon and Knife: Vol. 1-5 (1985; 2005)

Short story collections

- Weekend Trip (1976)
- The Tyrant (1987)
- Transparent Faces (1994)
- The Warrior and the Musician (1995)
