= Yuneisy Castillo =

Cuban softball player

Personal information
- Nationality: Cuban
- Born: 20 July 1979
- Died: 7 July 2007 (aged 27)

Sport
- Sport: Softball

Yuneisy Castillo (20 July 1979 – 7 July 2007) was a Cuban softball player. She competed in the women's tournament at the 2000 Summer Olympics.
