= Yamila Flor =

Cuban softball player

Personal information
- Born: 7 January 1973 (age 52); Las Tunas, Cuba

Sport
- Sport: Softball

Yamila Flor (born 7 January 1973) is a Cuban softball player. She competed in the women's tournament at the 2000 Summer Olympics.
