= Kyung-hee Hong =

South Korean sculptor

- Born: 1954 (age 70–71); Seoul, South Korea
- Occupation: Sculptor
- Employer: Hongik University

Korean name
- Hangul: 홍경희
- RR: Hong Gyeonghui
- MR: Hong Kyŏnghŭi

'Work 8403', copper and kuromido sculpture by Kyung-hee Hong, 1984, Metropolitan Museum of Art

Kyung-hee Hong (born November 18, 1954) is a South Korean sculptor. Born in Seoul, she holds an MFA degree in metal craft and teaches at the College of Fine Art and Design of Hongik University in Seoul, South Korea. Her sculpture was included in the exhibit One of a Kind: The Studio Craft Movement at the Metropolitan Museum of Art in New York City from December 22, 2006, to September 3, 2007.
