= Amauris Cardenas =

Cuban handball player (born 1973)

Personal information
- Nationality: Cuban
- Born: 1 March 1973 (age 52)

Sport
- Sport: Handball

Amauris Cardenas (born 1 March 1973) is a Cuban handball player. He competed in the men's tournament at the 2000 Summer Olympics.
