= Hong Seung-hyun =

South Korean footballer (born 1996)

Personal information
- Full name: Hong Seung-hyun
- Date of birth: 28 December 1996 (age 29)
- Place of birth: South Korea
- Height: 1.80 m (5 ft 11 in)
- Position: Defender

Team information
- Current team: Gimhae FC

Youth career
- 2013–2016: Dongbuk High School

Senior career*
Years	Team	Apps	(Gls)
2016–2017	Daegu FC	22	(0)
2018	FC Anyang	5	(0)
2019-2020	Cheonan City FC	45	(0)
2021	Seoul E-Land FC	0	(0)
2022-	Gimhae FC	28	(0)
- * Club domestic league appearances and goals as of 22 October 2022

- Hong Seung-hyun
- Hangul: 홍승현
- RR: Hong Seunghyeon
- MR: Hong Sŭnghyŏn

Hong Seung-hyun (Korean: 홍승현; born 28 December 1996) is a South Korean footballer who plays as defenderfor Gimhae FC in K3 League.

== Career ==
Hong joined K League 2 side Daegu FC before 2016 season starts.
