= Dennis Hong =

American roboticist

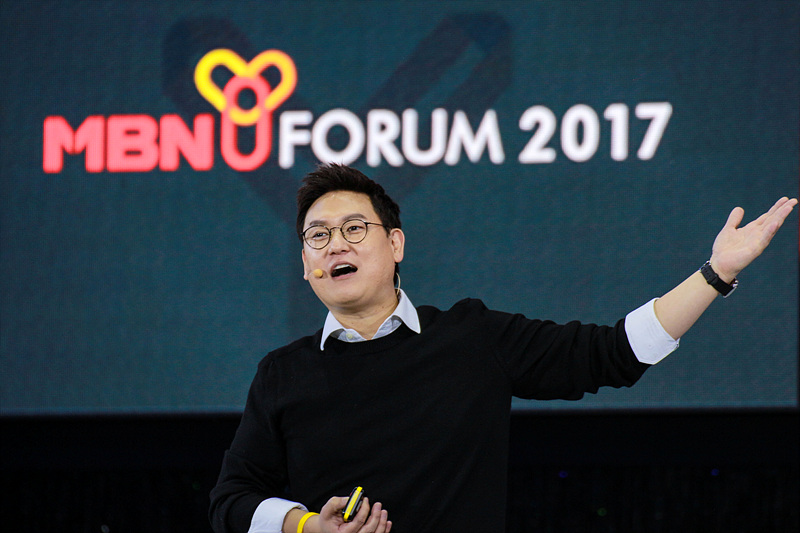
- Hong in February 2017
- Born: January 24, 1971; Los Angeles, California, US
- Education: University of Wisconsin–Madison; Purdue University
- Scientific career
- Fields: Robotics

Korean name
- Hangul: 홍원서
- Hanja: 洪元瑞
- Revised Romanization: Hong Won-seo
- McCune–Reischauer: Hong Wŏnsŏ

Dennis Won-seo Hong (born January 24, 1971) is an American mechanical engineer and roboticist.

== Career ==
After finishing high school in Seoul, Hong attended University of Wisconsin, graduating in 1994. He is a professor at the University of California, Los Angeles. Hong is also founder of RoMeLa (Robotics & Mechanisms Laboratory). He has been dubbed "the Leonardo da Vinci of robotics".

In November 2020, he was appointed as an honorary ambassador of Seoul.

== Awards and nominations ==
- 2007 NSF (National Science Foundation) CAREER Award
- 2007 DARPA Urban Challenge, 3rd Place
- 2009 Popular Science Brilliant 10
- 2009 Ralph R. Teetor Educational Award
- 2009 Forward Under 40 honoree by the University of Wisconsin–Madison Alumni Association
- 2011 “Louis Vuitton Cup” Best Humanoid Award
- 2015 Gilbreth Lectureship, NAE (National Academy of Engineering)
- 2015 Hyupsung Social Contribution Award
