= Niolis Ramos =

Cuban softball player (born 1971)

Niolis Ramos (born 26 January 1971) is a Cuban softball player. She competed in the women's tournament at the 2000 Summer Olympics.
