= Mohamed Madi =

Tunisian handball player

Personal information
- Nationality: Tunisian
- Born: 12 September 1967 (age 57)

Sport
- Sport: Handball

Mohamed Madi (born 12 September 1967) is a Tunisian handball player. He competed in the men's tournament at the 2000 Summer Olympics.
