= Hong Sun-bo =

South Korean water polo player

Personal information
- Nationality: South Korean
- Born: 26 March 1968 (age 57)

Sport
- Sport: Water polo

Hong Sun-bo (born 26 March 1968) is a South Korean water polo player. He competed in the men's tournament at the 1988 Summer Olympics.
