= Luisa Medina =

Cuban softball player

Personal information
- Nationality: Cuban
- Born: 19 August 1965 (age 59)

Sport
- Sport: Softball

Luisa Medina (born 19 August 1965) is a Cuban softball player. She competed in the women's tournament at the 2000 Summer Olympics.
