= Roman Pungartnik =

Slovenian handball player

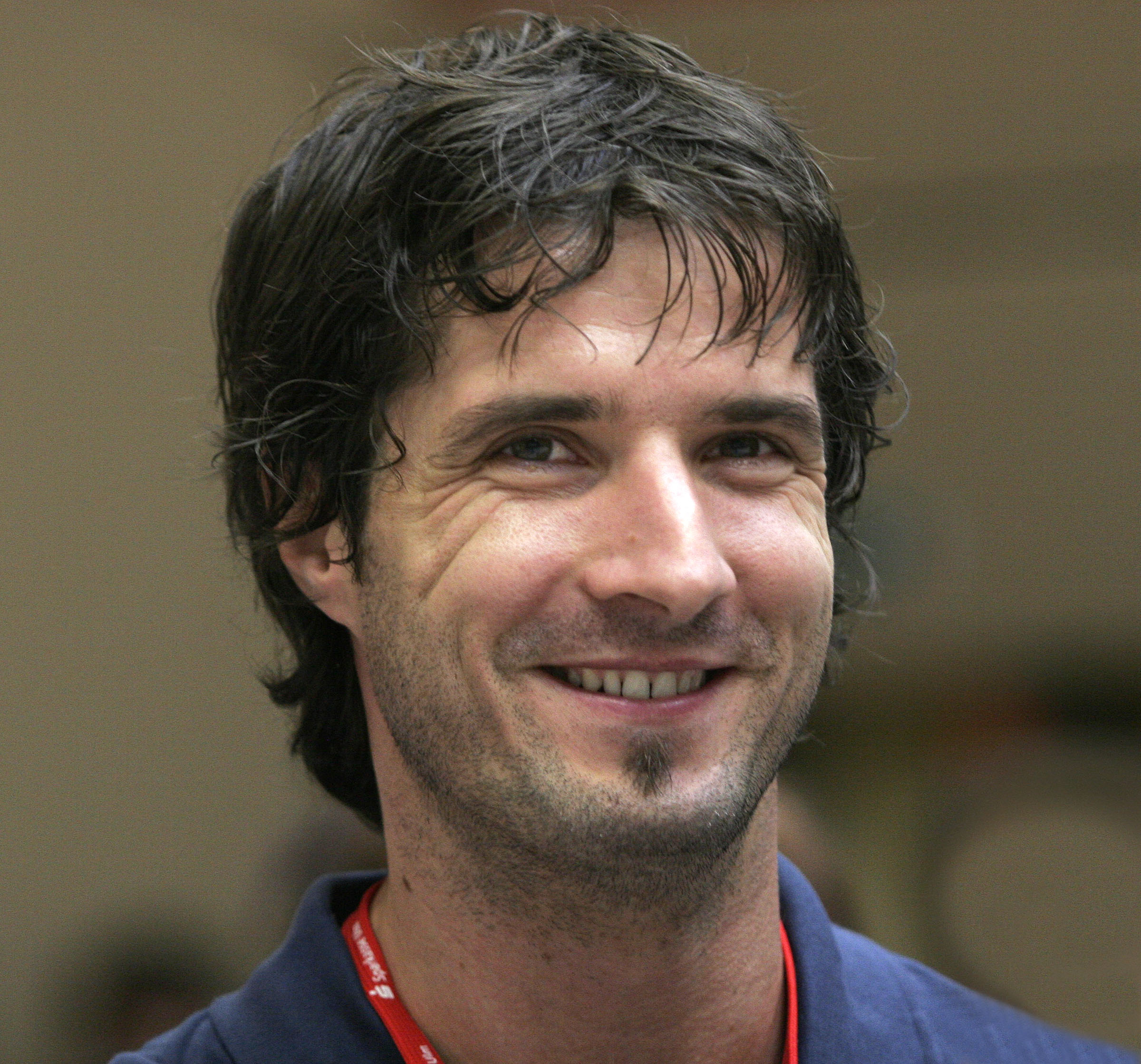
- Roman Pungartnik in 2007

Personal information
- Nationality: Slovenian
- Born: 16 May 1971 (age 53); Celje, Yugoslavia

Sport
- Sport: Handball

Roman Pungartnik (born 16 May 1971) is a Slovenian handball player. He competed in the men's tournament at the 2000 Summer Olympics.
