= María Arceo =

Cuban softball player (born 1965)

Personal information
- Nationality: Cuban
- Born: 19 December 1965 (age 59)

Sport
- Sport: Softball

María Arceo (born 19 December 1965) is a Cuban softball player. She competed in the women's tournament at the 2000 Summer Olympics.
