= Hong Changsoo =

Hong Changsoo (Korean: 홍창수, 1964 - ) is a Korean playwright. He debuted in 1999 with Obongsan Buljireuda (오봉산 불지르다 Setting Fire to the Obongsan Mountain). As playwright and director, he has staged many plays, and as scholar, he published research papers and translations related to theater. His plays have been displayed in various forms reflecting history, folk tales or traditional plays as well as science fiction and contemporary reality.

== Life ==
=== Youth ===
He spent his youth in extreme poverty. When he was in the fourth grade, his family had to be separated and some of his siblings died. In order to escape poverty, he used to dream of becoming a professional boxer as boxing was popular at that time. But as he started writing poetry in a literary club in high school, he gave up on his dream and became interested in literature. In the literary club, he met seniors such as Kim Dongsu, Chae Yunil, Yun Uyeong who became directors for theater later.

After he went to college, he joined a poetry writing club, wanting to be a poet. When he took part in a play by chance as staff, he became attracted to plays. He was in charge of the stage for Endgame by Samuel Beckett and stage lighting for Three Sisters by Anton Chekhov. While he attended a lecture, “Introduction of Modern English and American Plays” by Yeo Seokki, he could learn about plays written by English and American writers such as Harold Pinter and Edward Albee. Before he joined the military, he wrote “Daeri Jeonjaeng (대리전쟁 Proxy War)” to practice playwriting. In graduate school, he read through a wide range of English and American plays and studied Korean traditional plays such as Madangguk and Pansori.

=== Theater ===
He actively participated in theater starting from 1998 when he co-dramatized Heiner Müller's Description of a Picture. In 1999, he directed his debut work, Setting Fire to the Obongsan Mountain, which was staged in the form of Madangguk. This play was so popular that it became a long-running show, thanks to which, Park Cheolmin was chosen as one of the top five actors by the Association of Theatre. Afterwards, Hong wrote and directed several plays including Shillaui Dalbam (신라의 달밤, Moonlit Night of Silla) (2000), Sureung (수릉 Sureung) (2002), Yunisang, nabi imaju (윤이상, 나비 이마주 Yun Isang, Image of Butterfly) (2007), Oneul naneun gaereul naatta (오늘 나는 개를 낳았다 Today I Gave Birth To a Dog) (2010), Wonmuintel (원무인텔 Unmanned Motel, Won) (2017).

Other than writing plays, he also taught how to write a play as a professor at Korea University while he continuously published research papers and translations related to theater. He was in charge of editing magazines such as Hanguk yeongeuk (한국연극 Korean Theater), Gongyeongwa iron (공연과 이론 Performance and Theory), and Hanguk huigok (Korean Plays) and published several theoretical reviews on theater. He served as chairman of the Korean Playwright Association from 2014 to 2016.

== Writing ==
=== Various Formats ===
The most distinguished characteristic of his plays is an experimental format. His first play, Setting Fire to the Obongsan Mountain (1999), illustrates class conflict in a form of Korean traditional play, Madangguk. His intention of applying Korean traditional culture to modern Korean theater is clearly shown in Moonlit Night of Silla (2000), adopted from Shakespeare's A Midsummer Night's Dream. With the Silla Dynasty as a background, Moonlit Night of Silla is about love stories of Hwarang displayed through traditional plays such as swordsmanship, mask dance, and a one-legged fight.

From his early works, he has also focused on imagery of theater. Description of a Picture (1998) shows violence and suppression in the world of human beings by maximizing the symbolism of imagery, and, Today I Gave Birth To a Dog, which is the first work he directed alone, embodies his sci-fi imagination through costume of a ‘doghum’ which has a human's body and dog's face.

=== Themes ===
Along with experimental formats, Hong's themes are realized to reflect various aspects. One of his early works, Sureung (2002) describes covert fights for power and tragic consequences between King Gongmin of Goryeo and Shin Don. Sureung, the key place of this play, is a tomb King Gongmin had built before he died, symbolizing Gongmin's ambiguity of his ambition toward power and disillusionment. Yeoreumangae (여름안개 Summer Fog) (2006) illustrates problems of the aged such as generational conflict, isolation, death, taking place in a retirement home, and Today I Gave Birth To a Dog (2010) represents criticism of social ills of the modern society through a dystopian atmosphere. Unmanned Motel, Won (2017) displays discrepancy between the social justice and personal desire concerning a local development project that was stopped by the excavation of ancient remains.

== Works ==
=== Collection of Plays ===
- 《오봉산 불지르다》, 월인, 1999 / Obongsan Buljireuda (Setting Fire to the Obongsan Mountain), Wolin, 1999.
- 수릉》, 연극과인간, 2004 / Sureung (Sureung), Yeonguekkwa Ingan, 2004.
- 《오늘 나는 개를 낳았다》, 연극과인간, 2013 / Oneul naneun gaereul naatta (Today I Gave Birth To a Dog), Yeonguekkwa Ingan, 2013.

=== Research Papers 연구서 ===
- 《한국 희곡 읽기의 새로움》, 월인, 1999 / Hankuk heuigok ilkkiui saeroum (New to Reading Korean Plays), Wolin, 1999.
- 《역사와 실존》, 연극과인간, 2006 / Yeoksawa Siljon (History and Existence), Yeonguekkwa Ingan, 2006.
- 《연극과 통찰》, 연극과인간, 2010 / Yeongeukgwa tongchal (Theater and Insight), Yeonguekkwa Ingan, 2010.
- 《동시대의 연극과 현실》, 연극과인간, 2013 / Dongsidaeui yeongeukkwa hyeonsil (Contemporary Theater and Reality), Yeonguekkwa Ingan, 2013.
- 《한국 근대 희극의 역사》, 고려대학교출판문화원, 2018 / Hanguk geundae huigeuke yeoksa (History of Modern Korean Theater), Korea University Press, 2018.
- 《한국근대 희극전집 1‧2》, 연극과인간, 2019 / Hanguk geundae huigeukjeonjip (Complete Works of Modern Korean Plays) Vol 1, 2, Yeonguekkwa Ingan, 2019.

=== Translations ===
- Louis E. Catron, The Elements of Playwriting, 1993 /《희곡 쓰기의 즐거움》, 홍창수 역, 예문, 1999.
- Oscar Gross Brockett, Franklin J. Hildy, History of the Theater /《연극의 역사 1‧2》(공역), 연극과인간, 2005.
- The Enjoyment of Theatre, Kenneth M. Cameron /《연극의 즐거움》홍창수 공역, 예문, 2006.

=== Compilations ===
- 《김우진 전집 1‧2‧3》(공편), 연극과인간, 2000 / Kimujin jeonjip (Complete Works of Kim Ujin) Vol 1, 2, 3, Yeongeukkwa Ingan, 2000.

== See also ==
- The Korean Playwright Association (April 18, 2019. 10:00, UTC +9:00)
