= Anayansi Pérez =

Cuban windsurfer

Personal information
- Full name: Anayansi Pérez Aragón
- Nationality: Cuba
- Born: 14 September 1976 (age 50)
- Height: 1.65 m (5 ft 5 in)
- Weight: 65 kg (143 lb)

Sport
- Sport: Windsurfing

Anayansi Pérez Aragón (Note: In this Spanish name, the first or paternal surname is Pérez and the second or maternal family name is Aragón.) (born 14 September 1976) is a Cuban windsurfer. She competed in the 2000 Summer Olympics.
