= Raúl Hardy =

Cuban handball player (born 1976)

Personal information
- Nationality: Cuban
- Born: 25 January 1976 (age 49)

Sport
- Sport: Handball

Raúl Hardy (born 25 January 1976) is a Cuban handball player. He competed in the men's tournament at the 2000 Summer Olympics.
