= Haydée Hernández =

Cuban softball player

Personal information
- Born: 4 February 1966 (age 59); Guane, Cuba

Sport
- Sport: Softball

Haydée Hernández (born 4 February 1966) is a Cuban softball player. She competed in the women's tournament at the 2000 Summer Olympics.
