= Luis Silveira (handballer) =

Cuban handball player (born 1973)

Personal information
- Nationality: Cuban
- Born: 27 June 1973 (age 53)

Sport
- Sport: Handball

Luis Silveira (born 27 June 1973) is a Cuban handball player. He competed in the men's tournament at the 2000 Summer Olympics.
