= María Zamora (softball) =

Cuban softball player

Personal information
- Nationality: Cuban
- Born: 28 October 1964 (age 61)

Sport
- Sport: Softball

María de la Caridad Zamora Clavo (born 28 October 1964) is a Cuban softball player. She competed in the women's tournament at the 2000 Summer Olympics.
