= Handball at the 2000 Summer Olympics – Men's tournament =

2000 Men's Olympic handball tournament
Tournament details
- Host country: Australia
- Venues: 2 (in 1 host city)
- Dates: 16–30 September 2000
- Teams: 12 (from 5 confederations)

Final positions
- Champions: Russia (1st title)
- Runners-up: Sweden
- Third place: Spain
- Fourth place: Yugoslavia

Tournament statistics
- Matches played: 44
- Goals scored: 2,252 (51.18 per match)
- Top scorers: (Sweden) Stefan Lövgren (51 goals)

The men's handball competition, one of two events of handball at the 2000 Summer Olympics, in Sydney, took place at The Dome (Sydney Olympic Park) during the preliminary round, quarter-finals, semi-finals and medal matches. A total of 180 players, distributed among twelve national teams, participated in this tournament.

== Medalists ==
Gold	Silver	Bronze
Russia Dmitry Filippov; Vyacheslav Gorpishin; Oleg Khodkov; Eduard Koksharov; Denis Krivoshlykov; Vasily Kudinov; Stanislav Kulinchenko; Dmitry Kuzelev; Andrey Lavrov; Igor Lavrov; Sergey Pogorelov; Pavel Sukosyan; Dmitri Torgovanov; Aleksandr Tuchkin; Lev Voronin	Sweden Magnus Andersson; Martin Boquist; Martin Frändesjö; Mathias Franzén; Peter Gentzel; Andreas Larsson; Ola Lindgren; Stefan Lövgren; Staffan Olsson; Johan Petersson; Tomas Svensson; Tomas Sivertsson; Pierre Thorsson; Ljubomir Vranjes; Magnus Wislander	Spain David Barrufet; Talant Duyshebaev; Mateo Garralda; Rafael Guijosa; Demetrio Lozano; Enric Masip; Jordi Núñez; Jesús Olalla; Juan Pérez; Xavier O'Callaghan; Antonio Carlos Ortega; Antonio Ugalde; Iñaki Urdangarín; Alberto Urdiales; Andrei Xepkin

== Qualification ==
Mean of qualification	Date	Host	Vacancies	Qualified
Host nation	24 September 1993	(Monaco) Monte Carlo	1	Australia
1999 World Championship	1–15 June 1999	Egypt	7	Sweden; Russia; Yugoslavia; Spain; Germany; France; Egypt
1999 Pan American Games	31 July – 7 August 1999	(Canada) Winnipeg	1	Cuba
African qualification tournament	15–18 October 1999	(Benin) Cotonou	1	Tunisia
2000 European Championship	21–30 January 2000	Croatia	1	Slovenia
2000 Asian Championship	25–30 January 2000	(Japan) Kumamoto	1	South Korea
Total			12	

== Preliminary round ==
All times are local (UTC+10).

=== Group A ===
Pos	Team	Pld	W	D	L	GF	GA	GD	Pts	Qualification
1	Russia	5	4	0	1	129	121	+8	8	Quarterfinals
2	Germany	5	3	1	1	128	113	+15	7	Quarterfinals
3	Yugoslavia	5	3	0	2	130	127	+3	6 (Note: Yugoslavia 25–22 Egypt)	Quarterfinals
4	Egypt	5	3	0	2	122	115	+7	6	Quarterfinals
5	South Korea	5	1	1	3	128	131	−3	3	9th place game
6	Cuba	5	0	0	5	128	158	−30	0	11th place game

Notes:

16 September 2000; 09:30	Germany	30–22	Cuba	Pavilion 2, Sydney; Referees: Gallego, Lamas (ESP)
16 September 2000; 09:30	Kretzschmar 7	(15–11)	Suárez, Uríos 6	Pavilion 2, Sydney; Referees: Gallego, Lamas (ESP)
16 September 2000; 09:30	3× (yellow card) 5× (suspension)		3× (yellow card) 5× (suspension)	Pavilion 2, Sydney; Referees: Gallego, Lamas (ESP)

16 September 2000; 14:30	Yugoslavia	25–24	South Korea	Pavilion 2, Sydney; Referees: Hansson, Olsson (SWE)
16 September 2000; 14:30	Butulija, Jovanović 6	(12–10)	Paek, Yoon K-s. 6	Pavilion 2, Sydney; Referees: Hansson, Olsson (SWE)
16 September 2000; 14:30	2× (yellow card) 4× (suspension) 1× (red card)		3× (yellow card) 2× (suspension)	Pavilion 2, Sydney; Referees: Hansson, Olsson (SWE)

16 September 2000; 19:30	Russia	22–21	Egypt	Pavilion 2, Sydney; Referees: Kohout, Dolejš (CZE)
16 September 2000; 19:30	Koksharov 7	(15–7)	Awaad 6	Pavilion 2, Sydney; Referees: Kohout, Dolejš (CZE)
16 September 2000; 19:30	3× (yellow card) 4× (suspension)		3× (yellow card) 2× (suspension)	Pavilion 2, Sydney; Referees: Kohout, Dolejš (CZE)

18 September 2000; 09:30	South Korea	24–24	Germany	Pavilion 2, Sydney; Referees: Kalin, Korič (SLO)
18 September 2000; 09:30	Yoon K-s. 11	(13–11)	Schwarzer 6	Pavilion 2, Sydney; Referees: Kalin, Korič (SLO)
18 September 2000; 09:30	3× (yellow card) 5× (suspension)		4× (yellow card) 6× (suspension)	Pavilion 2, Sydney; Referees: Kalin, Korič (SLO)

18 September 2000; 14:30	Egypt	22–25	Yugoslavia	Pavilion 2, Sydney; Referees: Gallego, Lamas (ESP)
18 September 2000; 14:30	Moemen 9	(14–11)	Škrbić 6	Pavilion 2, Sydney; Referees: Gallego, Lamas (ESP)
18 September 2000; 14:30	2× (yellow card) 1× (suspension)		4× (yellow card) 7× (suspension)	Pavilion 2, Sydney; Referees: Gallego, Lamas (ESP)

18 September 2000; 19:30	Cuba	26–31	Russia	Pavilion 2, Sydney; Referees: Nachevski, Nachevski (MKD)
18 September 2000; 19:30	Uríos 6	(14–15)	Filippov 12	Pavilion 2, Sydney; Referees: Nachevski, Nachevski (MKD)
18 September 2000; 19:30	3× (yellow card) 7× (suspension) 1× (red card)		4× (yellow card) 6× (suspension) 1× (red card)	Pavilion 2, Sydney; Referees: Nachevski, Nachevski (MKD)

20 September 2000; 11:30	Russia	26–24	South Korea	Pavilion 2, Sydney; Referees: Garcia, Moréno (FRA)
20 September 2000; 11:30	Voronin 7	(9–11)	Paek 12	Pavilion 2, Sydney; Referees: Garcia, Moréno (FRA)
20 September 2000; 11:30	3× (yellow card) 6× (suspension) 1× (red card)		3× (yellow card) 5× (suspension)	Pavilion 2, Sydney; Referees: Garcia, Moréno (FRA)

20 September 2000; 14:30	Egypt	29–26	Cuba	Pavilion 2, Sydney; Referees: Klucsó, Lekrinszki (HUN)
20 September 2000; 14:30	Zaky 8	(12–11)	Uríos 8	Pavilion 2, Sydney; Referees: Klucsó, Lekrinszki (HUN)
20 September 2000; 14:30	3× (yellow card) 3× (suspension)		2× (yellow card) 4× (suspension)	Pavilion 2, Sydney; Referees: Klucsó, Lekrinszki (HUN)

20 September 2000; 21:30	Yugoslavia	22–28	Germany	Pavilion 2, Sydney; Referees: Øie, Hogsnes (NOR)
20 September 2000; 21:30	Knežević 5	(11–13)	Kehrmann 7	Pavilion 2, Sydney; Referees: Øie, Hogsnes (NOR)
20 September 2000; 21:30	4× (yellow card) 3× (suspension)		2× (yellow card) 5× (suspension)	Pavilion 2, Sydney; Referees: Øie, Hogsnes (NOR)

22 September 2000; 09:30	South Korea	21–28	Egypt	Pavilion 2, Sydney; Referees: Øie, Hogsnes (NOR)
22 September 2000; 09:30	Paek, Yoon K-s. 7	(8–15)	Awaad, Zaky 6	Pavilion 2, Sydney; Referees: Øie, Hogsnes (NOR)
22 September 2000; 09:30	3× (yellow card) 2× (suspension)		3× (yellow card) 2× (suspension)	Pavilion 2, Sydney; Referees: Øie, Hogsnes (NOR)

22 September 2000; 11:30	Yugoslavia	33–26	Cuba	Pavilion 2, Sydney; Referees: Boye, Jensen (DEN)
22 September 2000; 11:30	three players 6	(16–10)	Uríos 7	Pavilion 2, Sydney; Referees: Boye, Jensen (DEN)
22 September 2000; 11:30	3× (yellow card) 9× (suspension) 1× (red card)		3× (yellow card) 6× (suspension) 1× (red card)	Pavilion 2, Sydney; Referees: Boye, Jensen (DEN)

22 September 2000; 19:30	Germany	25–23	Russia	Pavilion 2, Sydney; Referees: Gallego, Lamas (ESP)
22 September 2000; 19:30	Roos 6	(11–15)	Filippov 7	Pavilion 2, Sydney; Referees: Gallego, Lamas (ESP)
22 September 2000; 19:30	3× (yellow card) 8× (suspension)		3× (yellow card) 3× (suspension)	Pavilion 2, Sydney; Referees: Gallego, Lamas (ESP)

24 September 2000; 11:30	Cuba	28–35	South Korea	Pavilion 2, Sydney; Referees: Kalin, Korič (SLO)
24 September 2000; 11:30	Uríos 9	(13–15)	Yoon K-s. 8	Pavilion 2, Sydney; Referees: Kalin, Korič (SLO)
24 September 2000; 11:30	3× (yellow card) 3× (suspension)		3× (yellow card) 3× (suspension)	Pavilion 2, Sydney; Referees: Kalin, Korič (SLO)

24 September 2000; 16:30	Germany	21–22	Egypt	Pavilion 2, Sydney; Referees: Hansson, Olsson (SWE)
24 September 2000; 16:30	Kehrmann, Von Behren 5	(11–8)	Al-Nil 5	Pavilion 2, Sydney; Referees: Hansson, Olsson (SWE)
24 September 2000; 16:30	3× (yellow card) 2× (suspension)		3× (yellow card) 6× (suspension) 1× (red card)	Pavilion 2, Sydney; Referees: Hansson, Olsson (SWE)

24 September 2000; 21:30	Russia	27–25	Yugoslavia	Pavilion 2, Sydney; Referees: Garcia, Moréno (FRA)
24 September 2000; 21:30	Koksharov, Voronin 8	(14–12)	Butulija, Škrbić 6	Pavilion 2, Sydney; Referees: Garcia, Moréno (FRA)
24 September 2000; 21:30	3× (yellow card) 3× (suspension)		3× (yellow card) 2× (suspension)	Pavilion 2, Sydney; Referees: Garcia, Moréno (FRA)

=== Group B ===
Pos	Team	Pld	W	D	L	GF	GA	GD	Pts	Qualification
1	Sweden	5	5	0	0	155	121	+34	10	Quarterfinals
2	France	5	3	1	1	120	104	+16	7	Quarterfinals
3	Spain	5	3	0	2	144	126	+18	6	Quarterfinals
4	Slovenia	5	2	1	2	137	127	+10	5	Quarterfinals
5	Tunisia	5	1	0	4	111	117	−6	2	9th place game
6	Australia (H)	5	0	0	5	106	178	−72	0	11th place game

(H) Hosts

16 September 2000; 11:30	France	24–24	Slovenia	Pavilion 2, Sydney; Referees: Øie, Hogsnes (NOR)
16 September 2000; 11:30	three players 6	(9–11)	Pungartnik 6	Pavilion 2, Sydney; Referees: Øie, Hogsnes (NOR)
16 September 2000; 11:30	2× (yellow card) 5× (suspension)		2× (yellow card) 3× (suspension)	Pavilion 2, Sydney; Referees: Øie, Hogsnes (NOR)

16 September 2000; 16:30	Spain	24–22	Tunisia	Pavilion 2, Sydney; Referees: Nachevski, Nachevski (MKD)
16 September 2000; 16:30	Dujshebaev 7	(12–10)	Ben Amor 6	Pavilion 2, Sydney; Referees: Nachevski, Nachevski (MKD)
16 September 2000; 16:30	3× (yellow card) 7× (suspension) 1× (red card)		3× (yellow card) 5× (suspension)	Pavilion 2, Sydney; Referees: Nachevski, Nachevski (MKD)

16 September 2000; 21:30	Sweden	44–23	Australia	Pavilion 2, Sydney; Referees: Klucsó, Lekrinszki (HUN)
16 September 2000; 21:30	Franzén 8	(23–12)	Sestic 5	Pavilion 2, Sydney; Referees: Klucsó, Lekrinszki (HUN)
16 September 2000; 21:30	3× (yellow card) 2× (suspension)		3× (yellow card) 1× (suspension)	Pavilion 2, Sydney; Referees: Klucsó, Lekrinszki (HUN)

18 September 2000; 11:30	Tunisia	17–20	France	Pavilion 2, Sydney; Referees: Chung, Lim (KOR)
18 September 2000; 11:30	three players 4	(11–11)	three players 4	Pavilion 2, Sydney; Referees: Chung, Lim (KOR)
18 September 2000; 11:30	3× (yellow card) 3× (suspension)		2× (yellow card) 3× (suspension)	Pavilion 2, Sydney; Referees: Chung, Lim (KOR)

18 September 2000; 16:30	Australia	23–39	Spain	Pavilion 2, Sydney; Referees: Bojsen, Anusic (USA)
18 September 2000; 16:30	Sestic 5	(7–17)	Guijosa 10	Pavilion 2, Sydney; Referees: Bojsen, Anusic (USA)
18 September 2000; 16:30	2× (yellow card) 5× (suspension)		2× (yellow card) 3× (suspension)	Pavilion 2, Sydney; Referees: Bojsen, Anusic (USA)

18 September 2000; 21:30	Slovenia	30–32	Sweden	Pavilion 2, Sydney; Referees: Kohout, Dolejš (CZE)
18 September 2000; 21:30	Puc 7	(17–12)	Lövgren 10	Pavilion 2, Sydney; Referees: Kohout, Dolejš (CZE)
18 September 2000; 21:30	3× (yellow card) 6× (suspension) 3× (red card)		3× (yellow card) 3× (suspension)	Pavilion 2, Sydney; Referees: Kohout, Dolejš (CZE)

20 September 2000; 09:30	Sweden	27–18	Tunisia	Pavilion 2, Sydney; Referees: Litvinov, Khudoerko (RUS)
20 September 2000; 09:30	Lövgren 10	(13–11)	Ben Amor 6	Pavilion 2, Sydney; Referees: Litvinov, Khudoerko (RUS)
20 September 2000; 09:30	3× (yellow card) 5× (suspension)		3× (yellow card) 3× (suspension)	Pavilion 2, Sydney; Referees: Litvinov, Khudoerko (RUS)

20 September 2000; 16:30	Australia	20–33	Slovenia	Pavilion 2, Sydney; Referees: Chung, Lim (KOR)
20 September 2000; 16:30	Groenintwoud 5	(9–14)	Jovičič 8	Pavilion 2, Sydney; Referees: Chung, Lim (KOR)
20 September 2000; 16:30	3× (yellow card) 2× (suspension)		1× (yellow card) 1× (suspension)	Pavilion 2, Sydney; Referees: Chung, Lim (KOR)

20 September 2000; 19:30	Spain	23–25	France	Pavilion 2, Sydney; Referees: Boye, Jensen (DEN)
20 September 2000; 19:30	Guijosa 7	(11–11)	Fernandez 7	Pavilion 2, Sydney; Referees: Boye, Jensen (DEN)
20 September 2000; 19:30	3× (yellow card) 4× (suspension)		3× (yellow card) 6× (suspension)	Pavilion 2, Sydney; Referees: Boye, Jensen (DEN)

22 September 2000; 14:30	Tunisia	34–24	Australia	Pavilion 2, Sydney; Referees: Marić, Gardinovački (YUG)
22 September 2000; 14:30	M. Madi 8	(15–11)	Groenintwoud 6	Pavilion 2, Sydney; Referees: Marić, Gardinovački (YUG)
22 September 2000; 14:30	3× (yellow card) 3× (suspension)		3× (yellow card) 4× (suspension)	Pavilion 2, Sydney; Referees: Marić, Gardinovački (YUG)

22 September 2000; 16:30	Spain	31–28	Slovenia	Pavilion 2, Sydney; Referees: Litvinov, Khudoerko (RUS)
22 September 2000; 16:30	three players 5	(17–13)	Lubej 9	Pavilion 2, Sydney; Referees: Litvinov, Khudoerko (RUS)
22 September 2000; 16:30	3× (yellow card) 5× (suspension)		3× (yellow card) 3× (suspension)	Pavilion 2, Sydney; Referees: Litvinov, Khudoerko (RUS)

22 September 2000; 21:30	France	23–24	Sweden	Pavilion 2, Sydney; Referees: Nachevski, Nachevski (MKD)
22 September 2000; 21:30	Fernandez, Kervadec 7	(11–9)	three players 5	Pavilion 2, Sydney; Referees: Nachevski, Nachevski (MKD)
22 September 2000; 21:30	3× (yellow card) 3× (suspension)		3× (yellow card) 4× (suspension)	Pavilion 2, Sydney; Referees: Nachevski, Nachevski (MKD)

24 September 2000; 09:30	Slovenia	22–20	Tunisia	Pavilion 2, Sydney; Referees: Boye, Jensen (DEN)
24 September 2000; 09:30	Pungartnik 7	(9–12)	M. Madi 7	Pavilion 2, Sydney; Referees: Boye, Jensen (DEN)
24 September 2000; 09:30	3× (yellow card) 4× (suspension)		3× (yellow card) 5× (suspension)	Pavilion 2, Sydney; Referees: Boye, Jensen (DEN)

24 September 2000; 14:30	France	28–16	Australia	Pavilion 2, Sydney; Referees: Salim, Hassan (EGY)
24 September 2000; 14:30	Joulin 7	(13–7)	Sestic 5	Pavilion 2, Sydney; Referees: Salim, Hassan (EGY)
24 September 2000; 14:30	3× (yellow card) 1× (suspension)		2× (yellow card) 2× (suspension)	Pavilion 2, Sydney; Referees: Salim, Hassan (EGY)

24 September 2000; 19:30	Sweden	28–27	Spain	Pavilion 2, Sydney; Referees: Kohout, Dolejš (CZE)
24 September 2000; 19:30	Lövgren 7	(13–14)	Guijosa 8	Pavilion 2, Sydney; Referees: Kohout, Dolejš (CZE)
24 September 2000; 19:30	2× (yellow card) 8× (suspension) 1× (red card)		3× (yellow card) 7× (suspension) 1× (red card)	Pavilion 2, Sydney; Referees: Kohout, Dolejš (CZE)

== Knockout stage ==
=== Bracket ===
Quarterfinals
26 September
Russia	33
Slovenia	22
26 September
France	21
Yugoslavia	26
26 September
Germany	26
Spain	27
26 September
Sweden	27
Egypt	23

Semifinals
29 September
Russia	29
Yugoslavia	26
29 September
Spain	25
Sweden	32

Gold medal
30 September
Russia	28
Sweden	26
Bronze medal
30 September
Yugoslavia	22
Spain	26

5–8th place semifinals
29 September
Slovenia	22
France	29
29 September
Germany	24
Egypt	18

5th place
30 September
France	22
Germany	25
7th place
30 September
Slovenia	28
Egypt	34

=== Eleventh place game ===
26 September 2000; 09:30	Cuba	26–24	Australia	Pavilion 2, Sydney; Referees: Chung, Lim (KOR)
26 September 2000; 09:30	Hardy 7	(12–9)	Sestic 7	Pavilion 2, Sydney; Referees: Chung, Lim (KOR)
26 September 2000; 09:30	3× (yellow card) 2× (suspension)		3× (yellow card) 4× (suspension) 1× (red card)	Pavilion 2, Sydney; Referees: Chung, Lim (KOR)

=== Ninth place game ===
26 September 2000; 11:30	South Korea	24–19	Tunisia	Pavilion 2, Sydney; Referees: Tomaszewski, Adams (AUS)
26 September 2000; 11:30	Park M. 6	(13–7)	A. Madi 6	Pavilion 2, Sydney; Referees: Tomaszewski, Adams (AUS)
26 September 2000; 11:30	3× (yellow card) 2× (suspension)		3× (yellow card) 3× (suspension)	Pavilion 2, Sydney; Referees: Tomaszewski, Adams (AUS)

=== Quarterfinals ===
26 September 2000; 14:30	Russia	33–22	Slovenia	Pavilion 2, Sydney; Referees: Gallego, Lamas (ESP)
26 September 2000; 14:30	Koksharov 7	(14–9)	Šerbec 6	Pavilion 2, Sydney; Referees: Gallego, Lamas (ESP)
26 September 2000; 14:30	3× (yellow card) 3× (suspension)		3× (yellow card) 1× (suspension)	Pavilion 2, Sydney; Referees: Gallego, Lamas (ESP)

26 September 2000; 16:30	Spain	27–26	Germany	Pavilion 2, Sydney; Referees: Garcia, Moréno (FRA)
26 September 2000; 16:30	Guijosa 9	(11–13)	Kretzschmar 6	Pavilion 2, Sydney; Referees: Garcia, Moréno (FRA)
26 September 2000; 16:30	3× (yellow card) 3× (suspension) 1× (red card)		3× (yellow card) 4× (suspension)	Pavilion 2, Sydney; Referees: Garcia, Moréno (FRA)

26 September 2000; 19:30	Yugoslavia	26–21	France	Pavilion 2, Sydney; Referees: Boye, Jensen (DEN)
26 September 2000; 19:30	Jovanović, Škrbić 7	(10–9)	Anquetil 5	Pavilion 2, Sydney; Referees: Boye, Jensen (DEN)
26 September 2000; 19:30	3× (yellow card) 6× (suspension)		3× (yellow card) 3× (suspension)	Pavilion 2, Sydney; Referees: Boye, Jensen (DEN)

26 September 2000; 21:30	Sweden	27–23	Egypt	Pavilion 2, Sydney; Referees: Litvinov, Khudoerko (RUS)
26 September 2000; 21:30	Vranjes 7	(14–12)	Zaky 10	Pavilion 2, Sydney; Referees: Litvinov, Khudoerko (RUS)
26 September 2000; 21:30	3× (yellow card) 3× (suspension)		3× (yellow card) 8× (suspension)	Pavilion 2, Sydney; Referees: Litvinov, Khudoerko (RUS)

=== 5–8th place semifinals ===
29 September 2000; 09:30	Slovenia	22–29	France	The Dome, Sydney; Referees: Hansson, Olsson (SWE)
29 September 2000; 09:30	Šerbec 6	(9–17)	G. Gille 7	The Dome, Sydney; Referees: Hansson, Olsson (SWE)
29 September 2000; 09:30	3× (yellow card) 3× (suspension)		2× (yellow card) 1× (suspension)	The Dome, Sydney; Referees: Hansson, Olsson (SWE)

29 September 2000; 11:30	Germany	24–18	Egypt	The Dome, Sydney; Referees: Øie, Hogsnes (NOR)
29 September 2000; 11:30	Baur, Kehrmann 6	(10–9)	Hussein 6	The Dome, Sydney; Referees: Øie, Hogsnes (NOR)
29 September 2000; 11:30	2× (yellow card) 4× (suspension) 1× (red card)		2× (yellow card) 5× (suspension) 1× (red card)	The Dome, Sydney; Referees: Øie, Hogsnes (NOR)

=== Semifinals ===
29 September 2000; 14:30	Russia	29–26	Yugoslavia	The Dome, Sydney; Referees: Kohout, Dolejš (CZE)
29 September 2000; 14:30	Koksharov 9	(14–15)	Đukanović 6	The Dome, Sydney; Referees: Kohout, Dolejš (CZE)
29 September 2000; 14:30	3× (yellow card) 8× (suspension)		3× (yellow card) 6× (suspension) 1× (red card)	The Dome, Sydney; Referees: Kohout, Dolejš (CZE)

29 September 2000; 16:30	Spain	25–32	Sweden	The Dome, Sydney; Referees: Nachevski, Nachevski (MKD)
29 September 2000; 16:30	Masip, Ortega 6	(10–15)	Wislander 9	The Dome, Sydney; Referees: Nachevski, Nachevski (MKD)
29 September 2000; 16:30	3× (yellow card) 4× (suspension)		3× (yellow card) 9× (suspension)	The Dome, Sydney; Referees: Nachevski, Nachevski (MKD)

=== Seventh place game ===
30 September 2000; 14:30	Slovenia	28–34	Egypt	The Dome, Sydney; Referees: Bojsen, Anusic (USA)
30 September 2000; 14:30	Pungartnik 11	(12–18)	three players 7	The Dome, Sydney; Referees: Bojsen, Anusic (USA)
30 September 2000; 14:30	2× (yellow card) 3× (suspension)		2× (yellow card) 2× (suspension)	The Dome, Sydney; Referees: Bojsen, Anusic (USA)

=== Fifth place game ===
30 September 2000; 16:30	France	22–25	Germany	The Dome, Sydney; Referees: Salim, Hassan (EGY)
30 September 2000; 16:30	Burdet, Joulin 5	(11–11)	Baur 7	The Dome, Sydney; Referees: Salim, Hassan (EGY)
30 September 2000; 16:30	3× (yellow card) 6× (suspension)		3× (yellow card) 6× (suspension) 1× (red card)	The Dome, Sydney; Referees: Salim, Hassan (EGY)

=== Bronze medal game ===
30 September 2000; 19:30	Yugoslavia	22–26	Spain	The Dome, Sydney; Referees: Boye, Jensen (DEN)
30 September 2000; 19:30	Milosavljević, Škrbić 6	(9–12)	Ortega 7	The Dome, Sydney; Referees: Boye, Jensen (DEN)
30 September 2000; 19:30	3× (yellow card) 7× (suspension)		3× (yellow card) 7× (suspension)	The Dome, Sydney; Referees: Boye, Jensen (DEN)

=== Gold medal game ===
30 September 2000; 21:30	Russia	28–26	Sweden	The Dome, Sydney; Referees: Øie, Hogsnes (NOR)
30 September 2000; 21:30	Tuchkin 7	(13–14)	Vranjes 8	The Dome, Sydney; Referees: Øie, Hogsnes (NOR)
30 September 2000; 21:30	2× (yellow card) 3× (suspension)		2× (yellow card) 2× (suspension)	The Dome, Sydney; Referees: Øie, Hogsnes (NOR)

== Rankings and statistics ==
=== Final ranking ===
Rank	Team
1st place, gold medalist(s)	Russia
2nd place, silver medalist(s)	Sweden
3rd place, bronze medalist(s)	Spain
4	Yugoslavia
5	Germany
6	France
7	Egypt
8	Slovenia
9	South Korea
10	Tunisia
11	Cuba
12	Australia

=== Top goalscorers ===
Rank	Name	Goals	Shots	%
1	(Sweden) Stefan Lövgren	51	89	57.3
2	(Spain) Rafael Guijosa	48	68	70.6
3	(Slovenia) Roman Pungartnik	45	67	67.2
4	(South Korea) Paek Won-chul	42	73	57.5
4	(Cuba) Rolando Uríos	42	60	70.0
6	(Egypt) Ashraf Awaad	40	68	58.8
6	(Russia) Eduard Koksharov	40	57	70.2
8	(Egypt) Hussein Zaky	37	71	52.1
9	(South Korea) Yoon Kyung-shin	35	57	61.4
10	(Germany) Markus Baur	34	54	63.0
10	(Federal Republic of Yugoslavia) Dragan Škrbić	34	51	66.7

=== Top goalkeepers ===
Minimum 20% of total shots received by team

Rank	Name	%	Saves	Shots
1	(Sweden) Peter Gentzel	42.3	71	168
2	(South Korea) Kang Il-koo	37.0	20	54
3	(Egypt) Mohamed Bakir El-Nakib	36.8	57	155
4	(Egypt) Mohamed Sharaf El-Din	36.0	54	150
5	(Sweden) Tomas Svensson	35.9	56	156
6	(Russia) Andrey Lavrov	35.7	91	255
7	(Federal Republic of Yugoslavia) Dejan Perić	35.1	79	225
8	(France) Bruno Martini	34.8	47	135
9	(France) Christian Gaudin	34.6	47	136
10	(Spain) David Barrufet	34.5	79	229
