= Baseball at the 2000 Summer Olympics – Team squads =

The following is the list of squads that took place in the baseball tournament at the 2000 Summer Olympics.

== Australia ==
- Craig Anderson
- Grant Balfour
- Tom Becker
- Shayne Bennett
- Mathew Buckley
- Adam Burton
- Clayton Byrne
- Mark Ettles
- Paul Gonzalez
- Mark Hutton
- Ronny Johnson
- Grant McDonald
- Adrian Meagher
- Michael Moyle
- Michael Nakamura
- Dave Nilsson
- Glenn Reeves
- Brett Roneberg
- Chris Snelling
- Brad Thomas
- Rodney Van Buizen
- David White
- Gary White
- Glenn Williams

== Cuba ==
- Omar Ajete
- Yosvany Aragón
- Miguel Caldés
- Danel Castro
- José Contreras
- Yobal Dueñas
- Yasser Gómez
- José Ibar
- Orestes Kindelán
- Pedro Luis Lazo
- Omar Linares
- Óscar Macías
- Juan Manrique
- Javier Méndez
- Rolando Meriño
- Germán Mesa
- Antonio Pacheco
- Ariel Pestano
- Gabriel Pierre
- Maels Rodríguez
- Antonio Scull
- Luis Ulacia
- Lázaro Valle
- Norge Luis Vera

== Italy ==
- Matteo Baldacci
- Fabio Betto
- Roberto Cabalisti
- Luigi Carrozza
- Francesco Casolari
- Marc Cerbone
- Alberto D'Auria
- Davide Dallospedale
- Roberto De Franceschi
- Daniele Di Pace
- Andrea Evangelisti
- Daniele Frignani
- Emiliano Ginanneschi
- Seth La Fera
- Stefano Landuzzi
- Christopher Madonna
- Claudio Liverziani
- Christian Mura
- Daniel Newman
- Battista Perri
- Diego Ricci
- David Sheldon
- Jason Simontacchi
- Michele Toriaco

== Japan ==
- Shinnosuke Abe
- Norihiro Akahoshi
- Yoshikazu Doi
- Jun Heima
- Jun Hirose
- Tomohiro Iizuka
- Masanori Ishikawa
- Yoshihiko Kajiyama
- Masato Kawano
- Tomohiro Kuroki
- Nobuhiko Matsunaka
- Daisuke Matsuzaka
- Norihiro Nakamura
- Kosuke Noda
- Osamu Nogami
- Yoshinori Okihara
- Toshiya Sugiuchi
- Masanori Sugiura
- Fumihiro Suzuki
- So Taguchi
- Yukio Tanaka
- Shunsuke Watanabe
- Akichika Yamada
- Yuji Yoshimi

== Netherlands ==
- Evert-Jan 't Hoen
- Sharnol Adriana
- Johnny Balentina
- Patrick Beljaards
- Ken Brauckmiller
- Rob Cordemans
- Jeffrey Cranston
- Mike Crouwel
- Patrick de Lange
- Radhames Dijkhoff
- Robert Eenhoorn
- Rikkert Faneyte
- Chairon Isenia
- Percy Isenia
- Eelco Jansen
- Ferenc Jongejan
- Reily Legito
- Jurriaan Lobbezoo
- Remy Maduro
- Hensley Meulens
- Ralph Milliard
- Erik Remmerswaal
- Orlando Stewart
- Dirk van 't Klooster

== South Africa ==
- Neil Adonis
- Clint Alfino
- Francisco Alfino
- Paul Bell
- Vaughn Berriman
- Jason Cook
- Errol Davis
- Simon de la Rey
- Nick Dempsey
- Ashley Dove
- Darryl Gonsalves
- Brian Harrell
- Richard Harrell
- Tim Harrell
- Ian Holness
- Kevin Johnson
- Willem Kemp
- Morne MacKay
- Liall Mauritz
- Carl Michaels
- Glen Morris
- Alan Phillips
- Darryn Smith
- Russell van Niekerk

== South Korea ==
- Jang Sung-ho
- Chong Tae-hyon
- Chung Min-tae
- Jung Soo-keun
- Hong Sung-heon
- Jin Pil-jung
- Kim Dong-joo
- Kim Han-soo
- Kim Ki-tae
- Kim Soo-kyung
- Kim Tae-gyun
- Koo Dae-sung
- Lee Byung-kyu
- Lee Seung-ho
- Lee Seung-yeop
- Lim Chang-yong
- Lim Sun-dong
- Park Jae-hong
- Park Jin-man
- Park Jong-ho
- Park Kyung-oan
- Park Seok-jin
- Son Min-han
- Song Jin-woo

== United States ==
- Brent Abernathy
- Kurt Ainsworth
- Pat Borders
- Sean Burroughs
- John Cotton
- Travis Dawkins
- Adam Everett
- Ryan Franklin
- Chris George
- Shane Heams
- Marcus Jensen
- Mike Kinkade
- Rick Krivda
- Doug Mientkiewicz
- Mike Neill
- Roy Oswalt
- Jon Rauch
- Anthony Sanders
- Bobby Seay
- Ben Sheets
- Brad Wilkerson
- Todd Williams
- Ernie Young
- Tim Young
