= South Korea at the 2000 Summer Olympics =

- IOC code: KOR
- NOC: Korean Olympic Committee
- Website: www.sports.or.kr (in Korean and English)

in Sydney
- Competitors: 281 (175 men and 106 women) in 26 sports
- Flag bearer: Jeong Eun-soon
- Medals Ranked 12th: Gold 8 Silver 10 Bronze 10 Total 28

Summer Olympics appearances (overview)
- 1948; 1952; 1956; 1960; 1964; 1968; 1972; 1976; 1980; 1984; 1988; 1992; 1996; 2000; 2004; 2008; 2012; 2016; 2020; 2024; 2028

South Korea competed as Korea at the 2000 Summer Olympics in Sydney, Australia. Athletes from North and South Korea marched together in the opening ceremony under the Korean Unification Flag. 281 competitors, 175 men and 106 women, took part in 144 events in 26 sports.

== Medalists ==
Medal	Name	Sport	Event	Date
Gold	Jang Yong-ho, Kim Chung-tae, Oh Kyo-moon	Archery	Men's team	22 September
Gold	Yun Mi-jin	Archery	Women's individual	20 September
Gold	Kim Nam-soon, Kim Soo-nyung, Yun Mi-jin	Archery	Women's team	21 September
Gold	Kim Young-ho	Fencing	Men's foil	20 September
Gold	Kim Kyong-hun	Taekwondo	Men's +80 kg	30 September
Gold	Jung Jae-eun	Taekwondo	Women's 57 kg	30 September
Gold	Lee Sun-hee	Taekwondo	Women's 67 kg	29 September
Gold	Sim Kwon-ho	Wrestling	Men's Greco-Roman 54 kg	26 September
Silver	Kim Nam-soon	Archery	Women's individual	20 September
Silver	Lee Dong-soo, Yoo Yong-sung	Badminton	Men's doubles	21 September
Silver	South Korea national field hockey team: Han Hyung-bae; Hwang Jong-hyun; Jeon Hong-kwon; Jeon Jong-ha; Ji Seung-hwan; Kang Keon-wook; Kim Chel-hwan; Kim Kyung-seok; Kim Jung-chul; Kim Yong-bae; Kim Yoon; Lim Jong-chun; Lim Jung-woo; Seo Jong-ho; Song Seung-tae; Yeo Woon-kon	Field hockey	Men's competition	30 September
Silver	Lee Joo-hyung	Gymnastics	Men's parallel bars	25 September
Silver	Jung Bu-kyung	Judo	Men's 60 kg	16 September
Silver	Cho In-chul	Judo	Men's 81 kg	19 September
Silver	Kang Cho-hyun	Shooting	Women's 10 m air rifle	16 September
Silver	Sin Joon-sik	Taekwondo	Men's 68 kg	28 September
Silver	Moon Eui-jae	Wrestling	Men's freestyle 76 kg	30 September
Silver	Kim In-sub	Wrestling	Men's Greco-Roman 58 kg	27 September
Bronze	Kim Soo-nyung	Archery	Women's individual	20 September
Bronze	Ha Tae-kwon, Kim Dong-moon	Badminton	Men's doubles	21 September
Bronze	South Korea national baseball team: Chong Tae-hyon; Chung Min-tae; Hong Sung-heon; Jang Sung-ho; Jin Pil-jung; Jung Soo-keun; Kim Dong-joo; Kim Han-soo; Kim Ki-tae; Kim Soo-kyung; Kim Tae-gyun; Koo Dae-sung; Lee Byung-kyu; Lee Seung-ho; Lee Seung-yeop; Lim Chang-yong; Lim Sun-Dong; Park Jae-hong; Park Jin-man; Park Jong-ho; Park Kyung-oan; Park Seok-jin; Son Min-han; Song Jin-woo	Baseball (Men-only event)		27 September
Bronze	Lee Sang-gi	Fencing	Men's épée	16 September
Bronze	Lee Joo-hyung	Gymnastics	Men's horizontal bar	25 September
Bronze	Jung Sung-sook	Judo	Women's 63 kg	18 September
Bronze	Cho Min-sun	Judo	Women's 70 kg	18 September
Bronze	Kim Seon-young	Judo	Women's +78 kg	22 September
Bronze	Kim Moo-kyo, Ryu Ji-hae	Table tennis	Women's doubles	22 September
Bronze	Jang Jae-sung	Wrestling	Men's freestyle 63 kg	30 September

== Archery ==
The Korean women swept the medals in the individual event and took the gold medal in the team event. The men added another gold medal with their victory in the team round, despite none of the individual archers advancing past the quarterfinal.

Men

Athlete	Event	Ranking round		Round of 64	Round of 32	Round of 16	Quarterfinals	Semifinals	Final / BM	
Athlete	Event	Score	Seed	Opposition Score	Opposition Score	Opposition Score	Opposition Score	Opposition Score	Opposition Score	Rank
Jang Yong-Ho	Men's individual	665	1	Tupua (ASA); W 172–98	Orbay (TUR); W 169–160	Tsyrempilov (RUS); L 164–167	Did not advance			
Kim Chung-Tae	Men's individual	655	3	Bundhun (MRI); W 169–141	Di Buò (ITA); W 162–159	Frangilli (ITA); W 169–108	Petersson (SWE); L 111–112	Did not advance		
Oh Kyo-Moon	Men's individual	660	2	Rebelo (KEN); W 168–132	Johnson (USA); W 166–160	Makiyama (JPN); W 166–160	Wunderle (USA); L 105–108	Did not advance		
Jang Yong-Ho; Kim Chung-Tae; Oh Kyo-Moon	Men's team	1980	1	—N/a		Bye	Ukraine; W 258–236	Russia; W 240–229	Italy; W 255–247	1st place, gold medalist(s)

Women

Athlete	Event	Ranking round		Round of 64	Round of 32	Round of 16	Quarterfinals	Semifinals	Final / BM	
Athlete	Event	Score	Seed	Opposition Score	Opposition Score	Opposition Score	Opposition Score	Opposition Score	Opposition Score	Rank
Kim Nam-Soon	Women's individual	662	3	Win (MYA); W 167–134	Wen (TPE); W 162–158	He Y (CHN); W 165–162	Kawauchi (JPN); W 114–110	Choe (PRK); W 114–107	Yun (KOR); L 106–107	2nd place, silver medalist(s)
Kim Soo-Nyung	Women's individual	671	1	Tumusiime (UGA); W 164–124	Jennison (AUS); W 164–159	Tremelling (AUS); W 168–158	Nowicka (POL); W 106–100	Yun (KOR); L 105–107	Choe (PRK); W 103–101	3rd place, bronze medalist(s)
Yun Mi-Jin	Women's individual	661	4	Reyes (MEX); W 168–157	Karaseva (BLR); W 162–152	Williamson (GBR); W 173–164	Bolotova (RUS); W 110–105	Kim S-n (KOR); W 107–105	Kim N-s (KOR); W 107–106	1st place, gold medalist(s)
Kim Nam-Soon; Kim Soo-Nyung; Yun Mi-Jin	Women's team	1994	1	—N/a		Bye	United States; W 252–240	Germany; W 240–229	Ukraine; W 251–239	1st place, gold medalist(s)

== Athletics ==
=== Men's track ===
Athlete	Event	Heat		Quarterfinal		Semifinal		Final	
Athlete	Event	Result	Rank	Result	Rank	Result	Rank	Result	Rank
Kim Soon-Hyung	800m	1:48.49	7	Did not advance					
Lee Du-yeon	400m hurdles	52.61	8	Did not advance					
Baek Seung-do	Marathon	—N/a						2:28:25	65
Jeong Nam-gyun	Marathon	—N/a						2:22:23	45
Lee Bong-Ju	Marathon	—N/a						2:17:57	24
Shin Il-Yong	20km walk	—N/a						1:26:22	30

=== Men's field ===
Athlete	Event	Qualification		Final	
Athlete	Event	Distance	Position	Distance	Position
Sung Hee-Jun	Long jump	NM		Did not advance	
Lee Jin-taek	High jump	2.20	21	Did not advance	
Song Dong-hyeon	Javelin throw	70.48	31	Did not advance	

=== Women's track ===
Athlete	Event	Heat		Quarterfinal		Semifinal		Final	
Athlete	Event	Result	Rank	Result	Rank	Result	Rank	Result	Rank
Kim Mi-Jung	20km walk	—N/a						1:36.09	25
Oh Mi-Ja	Marathon	—N/a						2:38:42	34

=== Women's field ===
Athlete	Event	Qualification		Final	
Athlete	Event	Distance	Position	Distance	Position
Lee Myung-sun	Shot put	17.44	15	Did not advance	
Lee Young-sun	Javelin throw	49.84	33	Did not advance	

== Badminton ==
Men's singles

Athlete	Event	Round of 64	Round of 32	Round of 16	Quarterfinal	Semifinal	Final / BM	
Athlete	Event	Opposition Score	Opposition Score	Opposition Score	Opposition Score	Opposition Score	Opposition Score	Rank
Hwang Sun-ho	Men's singles	Bye	Gallet (FRA); W 15–7, 15–12	Mainaky (INA); L 5–15, 3–15	Did not advance			
Shon Seung-mo	Men's singles	Jonassen (DEN); L 17–14, 8–15, 15–17	Did not advance					

Men's doubles

Athlete	Event	Round of 32	Round of 16	Quarterfinal	Semifinal	Final / BM	
Athlete	Event	Opposition Score	Opposition Score	Opposition Score	Opposition Score	Opposition Score	Rank
Ha Tae-kwon; Kim Dong-moon	Men's doubles	Bye	Cheah (MAS); Yap (MAS); W 15–5, 15–3	Mainaky (INA); Subagja (INA); W 15–5, 15–9	Gunawan (INA); Wijaya (INA); L 13–15, 10–15	Bronze medal match Choong (MAS); Lee (MAS); W 15–2–15–8	3rd place, bronze medalist(s)
Lee Dong-soo; Yoo Yong-sung	Men's doubles	Bye	Knowles (GBR); Robertson (GBR); W 15–4, 15–8	Eriksen (DEN); Larsen (DEN); W 15–12, 15–10	Choong (MAS); Lee (MAS); W 15–12, 7–15, 15–4	Gunawan (INA); Wijaya (INA); L 10–15, 15–9, 7–15	2nd place, silver medalist(s)

Women's singles

Athlete	Event	Round of 64	Round of 32	Round of 16	Quarterfinal	Semifinal	Final / BM	
Athlete	Event	Opposition Score	Opposition Score	Opposition Score	Opposition Score	Opposition Score	Opposition Score	Rank
Lee Kyung-won	Women's singles	Bye	Nozdran (UKR); W 11–1, 11–5	Huang C-c (TPE); L 9–11, 6–11	Did not advance			
Kim Ji-hyun	Women's singles	Bye	Cloutier (CAN); W 11–1, 11–3	Grether (GER); W 11–0, 11–3	Dai (CHN); L 3–11, 4–11	Did not advance		

Women's doubles

Athlete	Event	Round of 32	Round of 16	Quarterfinal	Semifinal	Final / BM	
Athlete	Event	Opposition Score	Opposition Score	Opposition Score	Opposition Score	Opposition Score	Rank
Chung Jae-hee; Ra Kyung-min	Women's doubles	Bye	Davies (GBR); Hardaker (GBR); W 15–6, 15–1	Kirkegaard (DEN); Olsen (DEN); W 12–15, 15–12, 15–5	Huang N (CHN); Yang W (CHN); L 6–15, 11–15	Bronze medal match Gao L (CHN); Qin (CHN); L 10–15, 4–15	4
Lee Hyo-jung; Yim Kyung-jin	Women's doubles	Chen L-c (TPE); Tsai (TPE); W 15–11, 8–15, 15–12	Ge F (CHN); Gu J (CHN); L 3–15, 5–15	Did not advance			

Mixed doubles

Athlete	Event	Round of 32	Round of 16	Quarterfinal	Semifinal	Final / BM	
Athlete	Event	Opposition Score	Opposition Score	Opposition Score	Opposition Score	Opposition Score	Rank
Ha Tae-kwon; Chung Jae-hee	Mixed doubles	Druzchenko (UKR); Evtushenko (UKR); W 15–9, 15–5	Haryanto (INA); Timur (INA); L 13–15, 11–15	Did not advance			
Lee Dong-soo; Lee Hyo-jung	Mixed doubles	Holst-Christensen (DEN); Jorgensen (DEN); L 15–17, 12–15	Did not advance				
Kim Dong-moon; Ra Kyung-min	Mixed doubles	Bye	Sudhisodhi (THA); Thungthongkam (THA); W 15–7, 15–2	Zhang J (CHN); Gao L (CHN); L 11–15, 1–15	Did not advance		

== Baseball ==
The South Korean baseball team, which had finished last four years earlier, improved their result drastically in their second Olympic baseball appearance. They lost their games against perennial powers Cuba (which was the Cubans' 21st straight Olympic win) and the United States as well as Australia, but defeated defending silver medallist Japan as well as the other three teams in the competition. Their third-place finish in the preliminary round pitted them against the Americans in the semifinal, which Korea lost 3–2. In the bronze medal match, the Koreans again defeated the Japanese to take home the medal.

Team roster

- Park Seok-jin
- Song Jin-woo
- Son Min-han
- Park Jin-man
- Park Jong-ho
- Park Kyung-oan
- Lim Chang-yong
- Lim Sun-dong
- Park Jae-hong
- Lee Byung-kyu
- Lee Seung-ho
- Lee Seung-yuop
- Kim Soo-kyung
- Kim Tae-gyun
- Koo Dae-sung
- Kim Dong-joo
- Kim Han-soo
- Kim Ki-tae
- Jang Sung-ho
- Jin Pil-jung
- Jung Soo-keun
- Chong Tae-hyon
- Chung Min-tae
- Hong Sung-heon

Summary

Team	Event	Group Stage								Semifinal	Final / BM	
Team	Event	Opposition Score	Opposition Score	Opposition Score	Opposition Score	Opposition Score	Opposition Score	Opposition Score	Rank	Opposition Score	Opposition Score	Rank
South Korea men's	Men's tournament	Italy; W 10–2	Australia; L 3–5	Cuba; L 5–6	United States; L 0–4	Netherlands; W 2–0	Japan; W 7–6	South Africa; W 13–3	3 Q	United States; L 2–3	Japan; W 3–1	3rd place, bronze medalist(s)

Preliminary round

Pos	Team	Pld	W	L	RF	RA	RD	PCT	GB	Qualification
1	Cuba	7	6	1	50	17	+33	.857 (Note: Cuba defeated the United States 6–1.)	—	Advance to knockout round
2	United States	7	6	1	42	14	+28	.857	—	Advance to knockout round
3	South Korea	7	4	3	40	26	+14	.571 (Note: South Korea defeated Japan 7–6.)	2	Advance to knockout round
4	Japan	7	4	3	41	23	+18	.571	2	Advance to knockout round
5	Netherlands	7	3	4	19	29	−10	.429	3	
6	Italy	7	2	5	33	43	−10	.286 (Note: Italy defeated Australia 8–7.)	4	
7	Australia (H)	7	2	5	30	41	−11	.286	4	
8	South Africa	7	1	6	11	73	−62	.143	5	

(H) Hosts
Notes:

17 September	Italy	2–10	South Korea	Blacktown Olympic Park; Attendance: 2,951
17 September		Boxscore		Blacktown Olympic Park; Attendance: 2,951

18 September	South Korea	3–5	Australia	Sydney Baseball Stadium; Attendance: 13,281
18 September		Boxscore		Sydney Baseball Stadium; Attendance: 13,281

19 September	South Korea	5–6	Cuba	Sydney Baseball Stadium; Attendance: 13,565
19 September		Boxscore		Sydney Baseball Stadium; Attendance: 13,565

20 September	United States	4–0	South Korea	Sydney Baseball Stadium; Attendance: 13,818
20 September		Boxscore		Sydney Baseball Stadium; Attendance: 13,818

22 September	South Korea	2–0	Netherlands	Blacktown Olympic Park; Attendance: 3,350
22 September		Boxscore		Blacktown Olympic Park; Attendance: 3,350

23 September	Japan	6–7 (F/10)	South Korea	Sydney Baseball Stadium; Attendance: 13,970
23 September		Boxscore		Sydney Baseball Stadium; Attendance: 13,970

24 September	South Korea	13–3 (F/8)	South Africa	Sydney Baseball Stadium; Attendance: 13,864
24 September		Boxscore		Sydney Baseball Stadium; Attendance: 13,864

Semifinal

26 September	United States	3–2	South Korea	Sydney Baseball Stadium; Attendance: 14,002

Bronze medal game

27 September	South Korea	3 – 1	Japan	Sydney Baseball Stadium; Attendance: 14,058

== Basketball ==
Summary

Team	Event	Group Stage						Quarterfinal	Semifinal	Final / BM	
Team	Event	Opposition Score	Opposition Score	Opposition Score	Opposition Score	Opposition Score	Rank	Opposition Score	Opposition Score	Opposition Score	Rank
South Korea women's	Women's tournament	United States; L 75–89	New Zealand; W 101–62	Poland; L 62–77	Russia; W 75–73 (OT)	Cuba; W 69–56	3 Q	France; W 68–59	United States; L 65–78	Bronze Medal Match; Brazil; L 73–84 (OT)	4

=== Women's tournament ===
Team roster
- Jeon Ju-won
- Jeong Eun-soon
- Jang Sun-hyoung
- Jung Sun-min
- Kang Ji-sook
- Kim Ji-yoon
- Lee Eon-ju
- Lee Jong-ae
- Lee Mi-sun
- Park Jung-eun
- Wang Su-jin
- Yang Jung-ok

Group play

Pos	Team	Pld	W	L	PF	PA	PD	Pts	Qualification
1	United States	5	5	0	436	312	+124	10	Quarterfinals
2	Russia	5	3	2	398	325	+73	8 (Note: Head-to-head record: Russia 1–1 (1.30 GAvg), South Korea 1–1 (0.91), Poland 1–1 (0.84))	Quarterfinals
3	South Korea	5	3	2	382	367	+15	8	Quarterfinals
4	Poland	5	3	2	337	339	−2	8	Quarterfinals
5	Cuba	5	1	4	318	358	−40	6	
6	New Zealand	5	0	5	265	435	−170	5	

Source: FIBA archive
Rules for classification: 1) points; 2) head-to-head points; 3) head-to-head goal average; 4) head-to-head number of points scored.
Notes:

16 September 2000
21:30

South Korea	75–89	United States
Scoring by half: 43–53, 32–36
Pts: Jung 17; Rebs: Kim 4 Asts: Park 3		Pts: Swoopes 29; Rebs: Leslie 11; Asts: Edwards, Staley 4

The Dome, Sydney
Attendance: 6,939
Referees: Dorizon (FRA), Landeira (ESP)

18 September 2000
14:30

New Zealand	62–101	South Korea
Scoring by half: 25–48, 37–53
Pts: Farmer 20; Rebs: Brunton 9 Asts: Farmer 3		Pts: Chung 16; Rebs: Jang 9 Asts: Lee M.-s., Chun 5

The Dome, Sydney
Attendance: 7,298
Referees: Degagne (CAN), Gasperin (FRA)

20 September 2000
19:30

South Korea	62–77	Poland
Scoring by half: 38–39, 24–38
Pts: Jung 19; Rebs: Chung 7 Asts: Yang, Chung 3		Pts: Dydek 26; Rebs: Dydek 18; Asts: Wlaźlak 6

The Dome, Sydney
Attendance: 8,412
Referees: Mildenhall (AUS), Santos (BRA)

22 September 2000
9:30

Russia	73–75 (OT)	South Korea
Scoring by half: 37–34, 32–35 Overtime: 4–6
Pts: Abrosimova 17; Rebs: Khudashova 7 Asts: Abrosimova 6		Pts: Chun 22; Rebs: Cbun, Chung 4 Asts: Chung 10

The Dome, Sydney
Attendance: 6,006
Referees: Figueroa (PUR), Zancanella (ITA)

24 September 2000
14:30

Cuba	56–69	South Korea
Scoring by half: 28–34, 28–35
Pts: Castillo 17; Rebs: Martínez 8 Asts: four players 2		Pts: Yang 17; Rebs: Jung 12; Asts: Chun 11

The Dome, Sydney
Attendance: 8,486
Referees: Kantner (USA), Jovčić (YUG)

Quarterfinal

27 September 2000
20:00

Report

France	59–68	South Korea
Scoring by half: 27–30, 32–38
Pts: Melain 21; Rebs: Melain 11; Asts: three players 2 each		Pts: Yang J-o 15; Rebs: Jung S-m 5 Asts: Chung E-s 5

The Dome, Sydney
Attendance: 14,605
Referees: Chaves (ARG), Gillespie (AUS)

Semifinal

29 September 2000
16:30

South Korea	65–78	United States
Scoring by half: 40–42, 25–36
Pts: Park 14; Rebs: Chun 5 Asts: Chung 5		Pts: Swoopes 19; Rebs: Leslie 12; Asts: Swoopes 5

Sydney SuperDome, Sydney
Attendance: 14,698
Referees:
Romualdas Brazauskas (Lithuania)
Rick Degagne (Canada)

Bronze medal game

30 September 2000
18:00

South Korea	73–84 (OT)	Brazil
Scoring by half: 34–30, 31–35 Overtime: 8–19
Pts: Jung 23; Rebs: Yang, Jung 5 Asts: Chun 6		Pts: Arcain 28; Rebs: Oliveira 16; Asts: A. Santos 4

Sydney Superdome, Sydney
Attendance: 14,678
Referees: Gillespie (AUS), Jones (USA)

== Boxing ==
Athlete	Event	Round of 32	Round of 16	Quarterfinals	Semifinals	Final	
Athlete	Event	Opposition Result	Opposition Result	Opposition Result	Opposition Result	Opposition Result	Rank
Kim Ki-suk	Light flyweight	SS Singh (IND); W 9–5	Masara (INA); W 8–4	Asloum (FRA); L 8–12	Did not advance		
Kim Tai-kyu	Flyweight	Mantilla (CUB); L 8–18	Did not advance				
Cho Suk-hwan	Bantamweight	Rahimov (UZB); L RSC	Did not advance				
Park Heung-min	Featherweight	Bye	Tamsamani (MAR); L 14–21	Did not advance			
Hwang Seong-beom	Light welterweight	Cendrowski (POL); W 14–4	Leonov (RUS); L 10–14	Did not advance			
Bae Jin-seok	Welterweight	Ulusoy (TUR); L 6–8	Did not advance				
Song In-joon	Light welterweight	Bye	Hikal (EGY); L 5–16	Did not advance			
Im Jung-bin	Middleweight	Yasser (EGY); W 8–7	Kuloglu (TUR); RET	Did not advance			
Choi Ki-soo	Light heavyweight	G Singh (IND); L 9–11	Did not advance				

== Canoeing ==
=== Sprint ===
Athlete	Event	Heats		Semifinals		Final	
Athlete	Event	Time	Rank	Time	Rank	Time	Rank
Nam Sung-ho	Men's K-1 500m	1:45.163	5 Q	1:46.008	8	Did not advance	
Nam Sung-ho	Men's K-1 1000m	3:46.669	7	Did not advance			

== Cycling ==
=== Track ===
Points race

Athlete	Event	Laps behind	Points	Rank
Cho Ho-sung	Men's points race	1	15	4

Keirin

Athlete	Event	First round	Repechage	Second round	Final
Athlete	Event	Rank	Rank	Rank	Rank
Eom In-yeong	Men's keirin	3 R	4	Did not advance	

=== Mountain biking ===
Athlete	Event	Time	Rank
Gang Dong-u	Men's cross-country	–2 laps	38

== Diving ==
Athlete	Event	Preliminary		Semifinal				Final		Total	
Athlete	Event	Points	Rank	Points	Rank	Total	Rank	Points	Rank	Points	Rank
Cho Dae-don	Men's 10 m platform	319.53	32	Did not advance							
Kwon Kyung-min	Men's 3 m springboard	318.45	34	Did not advance							
Yu Chang-jun	Men's 10 m platform	331.05	29	Did not advance							
Choi Hye-jin	Women's 10 m platform	187.17	39	Did not advance							

== Fencing ==
Seven fencers, five men and two women, represented South Korea in 2000.

Men

Athlete	Event	Round of 64	Round of 32	Round of 16	Quarterfinal	Semifinal	Final / BM	
Athlete	Event	Opposition Score	Opposition Score	Opposition Score	Opposition Score	Opposition Score	Opposition Score	Rank
Lee Sang-Gi	Men's épée	Bye	Steifensand (GER); W 15–8	Rivas (COL); W 15–13	Srecki (FRA); W 15–14	Kolobkov (RUS); L 9–13	Fischer (SUI); W 15–14	3rd place, bronze medalist(s)
Lee Sang-Yeop	Men's épée	Bye	Zhakarov (BLR); W 15–14	Kolobkov (RUS); L 8–15	Did not advance			
Yang Noe-Seong	Men's épée	Bye	Fischer (SUI); L 12–13	Did not advance				
Kim Yeong-Ho	Men's foil	Bye	Guyart (FRA); W 15–13	Bayer (USA); W 15–14	Holubytskiy (UKR); W 15–5	Shevchenko (RUS); W 15–14	Bißdorf (GER); W 15–14	1st place, gold medalist(s)
Lee Seung-Won	Men's sabre	Waller (SUI); W 15–13	Ferjancsik (HUN); L 4–15	Did not advance				
Lee Sang-Ki; Lee Sang-Yeop; Yang Noe-Seong	Men's team épée	—N/a			Belarus; W 45–44	Italy; L 43–44	Cuba; L 31–45	4

Women

Athlete	Event	Round of 64	Round of 32	Round of 16	Quarterfinal	Semifinal	Final / BM	
Athlete	Event	Opposition Score	Opposition Score	Opposition Score	Opposition Score	Opposition Score	Opposition Score	Rank
Go Jeong-jeon	Women's épée	Bye	Logunova (RUS); L 9–15	Did not advance				
Seo Mi-Jeong	Women's foil	Luan (CAN); W 15–8	Vezzali (ITA); L 3–15	Did not advance				

== Football ==
Summary

Team	Event	Group stage				Quarterfinal	Semifinal	Final / BM	
Team	Event	Opposition Score	Opposition Score	Opposition Score	Rank	Opposition Score	Opposition Score	Opposition Score	Rank
South Korea men's	Men's tournament	Spain; L 0–3	Morocco; W 1–0	Chile; W 1–0	3	Did not advance			

=== Men's tournament ===
Team roster

- (1.) Choi Hyun
- (2.) Park Ji-sung
- (3.) Park Jae-hong
- (4.) Park Jin-seop
- (5.) Sim Jae-won
- (6.) Kim Do-kyun
- (7.) Choi Chul-woo
- (8.) Ko Jong-soo
- (9.) Kim Do-hoon
- (10.) Lee Chun-soo
- (11.) Lee Dong-gook
- (12.) Lee Young-pyo
- (13.) Park Dong-hyuk
- (14.) Kang Chul
- (15.) Cho Se-kwon
- (16.) Kim Sang-sik
- (17.) Choi Tae-uk
- (18.) Kim Yong-dae
- (19.) Song Chong-gug
- (20.) Kim Gil-sik
- (21.) Park Kang-jo
- (22.) Lee Woon-jae

Group play

Team	Pld	W	D	L	GF	GA	GD	Pts
Chile	3	2	0	1	7	3	+4	6
Spain	3	2	0	1	6	3	+3	6
South Korea	3	2	0	1	2	3	−1	6
Morocco	3	0	0	3	1	7	−6	0

14 September 2000
18:30

South Korea	0–3	Spain
	Report	Velamazán 10'; José Mari 26'; Xavi 37'

Hindmarsh Stadium, Adelaide
Attendance: 14,060
Referee: Felipe Ramos (Mexico)

17 September 2000
18:30

South Korea	1–0	Morocco
Lee Chun-soo 53'	Report

Hindmarsh Stadium, Adelaide
Attendance: 12,753
Referee: Herbert Fandel (Germany)

20 September 2000
18:30

South Korea	1–0	Chile
Lee Dong-gook 28'	Report

Hindmarsh Stadium, Adelaide
Attendance: 16,309
Referee: Ľuboš Micheľ (Slovakia)

== Gymnastics ==
Men's team

Athlete	Event	Qualification								Final							
Athlete	Event	Apparatus						Total	Rank	Apparatus						Total	Rank
Athlete	Event	F	PH	R	V	PB	HB	Total	Rank	F	PH	R	V	PB	HB	Total	Rank
Cho Seong-min	Team	9.350	9.675	9.512	9.700	9.675	9.025	56.937	13 Q	Did not advance							
Jung Jin-soo	Team	8.850	9.500	9.512	9.650	9.775 Q	9.287	56.574	17 Q	Did not advance							
Lee Joo-hyung	Team	8.712	9.650	9.050	9.012	9.800 Q	9.762 Q	55.986	31 Q	Did not advance							
Kim Dong-hwa	Team	8.112	9.300	8.187	9.225	9.250	9.050	53.124	48	Did not advance							
Lee Jang-hyung	Team	—N/a	9.737 Q	—N/a		9.575	9.537	28.849	83	Did not advance							
Yeo Hong-chul	Team	9.575	—N/a	9.500	9.687	—N/a		28.762	85	Did not advance							
Total	Team	36.487	38.562	37.574	38.262	38.825	37.636	227.346	7	Did not advance							

Men's individual events

Athlete	Event	Apparatus						Total	Rank
Athlete	Event	F	PH	R	V	PB	HB	Total	Rank
Cho Seong-min	All-around	9.262	9.250	9.550	9.600	9.662	8.900	56.224	22
Lee Joo-hyung	All-around	9.237	9.650	9.600	9.525	9.750	9.700	57.462	10
Lee Jang-hyung	Pommel horse	—N/a	9.775	—N/a				9.775	4
Lee Joo-hyung	Parallel bars	—N/a				9.812	—N/a	9.812	2nd place, silver medalist(s)
Lee Joo-hyung	Horizontal bar	—N/a					9.775	9.775	3rd place, bronze medalist(s)

Women's artistic

Athlete	Event	Apparatus				Total	Rank	Apparatus				Total	Rank
Athlete	Event	V	UB	BB	F	Total	Rank	V	UB	BB	F	Total	Rank
Choi Mi-Sun	All-around	9.056	8.537	8.662	9.075	35.330	58	Did not advance					

== Handball ==
Team	Event	Group Stage						Quarterfinal	Semifinal	Final / BM	
Team	Event	Opposition Score	Opposition Score	Opposition Score	Opposition Score	Opposition Score	Rank	Opposition Score	Opposition Score	Opposition Score	Rank
South Korea men's	Men's tournament	FR Yugoslavia; L 24–25	Germany; D 24–24	Russia; L 24–26	Egypt; L 21–28	Cuba; W 35–28	5	—N/a		9th place game Tunisia; W 24–19	9
South Korea women's	Women's tournament	France; W 25–18	Romania; W 34–25	Hungary; W 41–33	Angola; W 31–24	—N/a	1 Q	Brazil; W 35–24	Denmark; L 29–31	Bronze medal game Norway; L 21–22	4

=== Men's tournament ===
Team roster

- Jo Beom-yeon
- Jo Chi-hyo
- Choi Hyeon-ho
- Hong Gi-il
- Gang Il-gu
- Lee Jae-wu
- Lee Seok-hyeong
- Mun Byeong-uk
- Baek Won-cheol
- Park Jeong-jin
- Park Min-cheol
- Park Seong-rip
- Yun Gyeong-min
- Yun Gyeong-sin

Group play

Pos	Team	Pld	W	D	L	GF	GA	GD	Pts	Qualification
1	Russia	5	4	0	1	129	121	+8	8	Quarterfinals
2	Germany	5	3	1	1	128	113	+15	7	Quarterfinals
3	FR Yugoslavia	5	3	0	2	130	127	+3	6 (Note: Yugoslavia 25–22 Egypt)	Quarterfinals
4	Egypt	5	3	0	2	122	115	+7	6	Quarterfinals
5	South Korea	5	1	1	3	128	131	−3	3	9th place game
6	Cuba	5	0	0	5	128	158	−30	0	11th place game

Notes:

16 September 2000; 14:30	FR Yugoslavia	25–24	South Korea	Pavilion 2, Sydney; Referees: Hansson, Olsson (SWE)
16 September 2000; 14:30	Butulija, Jovanović 6	(12–10)	Paek, Yoon K-s. 6	Pavilion 2, Sydney; Referees: Hansson, Olsson (SWE)
16 September 2000; 14:30	2× (yellow card) 4× (suspension) 1× (red card)		3× (yellow card) 2× (suspension)	Pavilion 2, Sydney; Referees: Hansson, Olsson (SWE)

18 September 2000; 09:30	South Korea	24–24	Germany	Pavilion 2, Sydney; Referees: Kalin, Korič (SLO)
18 September 2000; 09:30	Yoon K-s. 11	(13–11)	Schwarzer 6	Pavilion 2, Sydney; Referees: Kalin, Korič (SLO)
18 September 2000; 09:30	3× (yellow card) 5× (suspension)		4× (yellow card) 6× (suspension)	Pavilion 2, Sydney; Referees: Kalin, Korič (SLO)

20 September 2000; 11:30	Russia	26–24	South Korea	Pavilion 2, Sydney; Referees: Garcia, Moréno (FRA)
20 September 2000; 11:30	Voronin 7	(9–11)	Paek 12	Pavilion 2, Sydney; Referees: Garcia, Moréno (FRA)
20 September 2000; 11:30	3× (yellow card) 6× (suspension) 1× (red card)		3× (yellow card) 5× (suspension)	Pavilion 2, Sydney; Referees: Garcia, Moréno (FRA)

22 September 2000; 09:30	South Korea	21–28	Egypt	Pavilion 2, Sydney; Referees: Øie, Hogsnes (NOR)
22 September 2000; 09:30	Paek, Yoon K-s. 7	(8–15)	Awaad, Zaky 6	Pavilion 2, Sydney; Referees: Øie, Hogsnes (NOR)
22 September 2000; 09:30	3× (yellow card) 2× (suspension)		3× (yellow card) 2× (suspension)	Pavilion 2, Sydney; Referees: Øie, Hogsnes (NOR)

24 September 2000; 11:30	Cuba	28–35	South Korea	Pavilion 2, Sydney; Referees: Kalin, Korič (SLO)
24 September 2000; 11:30	Uríos 9	(13–15)	Yoon K-s. 8	Pavilion 2, Sydney; Referees: Kalin, Korič (SLO)
24 September 2000; 11:30	3× (yellow card) 3× (suspension)		3× (yellow card) 3× (suspension)	Pavilion 2, Sydney; Referees: Kalin, Korič (SLO)

Ninth place game

26 September 2000; 11:30	South Korea	24–19	Tunisia	Pavilion 2, Sydney; Referees: Tomaszewski, Adams (AUS)
26 September 2000; 11:30	Park M. 6	(13–7)	A. Madi 6	Pavilion 2, Sydney; Referees: Tomaszewski, Adams (AUS)
26 September 2000; 11:30	3× (yellow card) 2× (suspension)		3× (yellow card) 3× (suspension)	Pavilion 2, Sydney; Referees: Tomaszewski, Adams (AUS)

=== Women's tournament ===
Team roster

- Choi Hyeon-jeong
- Jeong Eun-hui
- Han Seon-hui
- Heo Sun-yeong
- Heo Yeong-suk
- Kim Hyang-gi
- Kim Hyeon-ok
- Kim Jin-sun
- Lee Jeong-yeong
- Lee Nam-su
- Lee Sang-eun
- Mun Gyeong-ha
- Oh Seong-ok
- Oh Yeong-ran
- Park Jeong-hui

Group play

Pos	Team	Pld	W	D	L	GF	GA	GD	Pts	Qualification
1	South Korea	4	4	0	0	131	100	+31	8	Quarterfinals
2	Hungary	4	2	1	1	119	106	+13	5	Quarterfinals
3	France	4	2	0	2	90	93	−3	4	Quarterfinals
4	Romania	4	1	1	2	99	101	−2	3	Quarterfinals
5	Angola	4	0	0	4	98	137	−39	0	Ninth place game

17 September 2000; 21:30	South Korea	25–18	France	Pavilion 2, Sydney; Referees: Boye, Jensen (DEN)
17 September 2000; 21:30	Lee S. 10	(15–3)	Lejeune 7	Pavilion 2, Sydney; Referees: Boye, Jensen (DEN)
17 September 2000; 21:30	3× (yellow card) 3× (suspension)		3× (yellow card) 3× (suspension)	Pavilion 2, Sydney; Referees: Boye, Jensen (DEN)

19 September 2000; 19:30	Romania	25–34	South Korea	Pavilion 2, Sydney; Referees: Litvinov, Khudoerko (RUS)
19 September 2000; 19:30	Dobrin, Luca 5	(9–16)	Lee S., Oh S. 8	Pavilion 2, Sydney; Referees: Litvinov, Khudoerko (RUS)
19 September 2000; 19:30	3× (yellow card) 2× (suspension)		2× (yellow card) 2× (suspension)	Pavilion 2, Sydney; Referees: Litvinov, Khudoerko (RUS)

21 September 2000; 21:30	Hungary	33–41	South Korea	Pavilion 2, Sydney; Referees: Nachevski, Nachevski (MKD)
21 September 2000; 21:30	Balogh 8	(19–16)	Lee S. 18	Pavilion 2, Sydney; Referees: Nachevski, Nachevski (MKD)
21 September 2000; 21:30	3× (yellow card) 6× (suspension)		4× (yellow card) 1× (suspension)	Pavilion 2, Sydney; Referees: Nachevski, Nachevski (MKD)

25 September 2000; 16:30	South Korea	31–24	Angola	Pavilion 2, Sydney; Referees: Tomaszewski, Adams (AUS)
25 September 2000; 16:30	Kim H. 6	(14–16)	Bengue 10	Pavilion 2, Sydney; Referees: Tomaszewski, Adams (AUS)
25 September 2000; 16:30	3× (yellow card) 2× (suspension)		2× (yellow card) 1× (suspension)	Pavilion 2, Sydney; Referees: Tomaszewski, Adams (AUS)

Quarterfinal

28 September 2000; 14:30	South Korea	35–24	Brazil	The Dome, Sydney; Referees: Klucsó, Lekrinszky (HUN)
28 September 2000; 14:30	Kim H. 9	(19–12)	Sales 8	The Dome, Sydney; Referees: Klucsó, Lekrinszky (HUN)
28 September 2000; 14:30	3× (yellow card) 2× (suspension)		2× (yellow card) 4× (suspension)	The Dome, Sydney; Referees: Klucsó, Lekrinszky (HUN)

Semifinal

29 September 2000; 19:30	South Korea	29–31	Denmark	The Dome, Sydney; Referees: Gallego, Lamas (ESP)
29 September 2000; 19:30	Lee S., Oh S. 7	(11–20)	Hoffmann 8	The Dome, Sydney; Referees: Gallego, Lamas (ESP)
29 September 2000; 19:30	3× (yellow card) 5× (suspension)		3× (yellow card) 4× (suspension)	The Dome, Sydney; Referees: Gallego, Lamas (ESP)

Bronze medal game

1 October 2000; 14:30	South Korea	21–22	Norway	The Dome, Sydney; Referees: Nachevski, Nachevski (MKD)
1 October 2000; 14:30	Oh S. 7	(13–12)	Grini 7	The Dome, Sydney; Referees: Nachevski, Nachevski (MKD)
1 October 2000; 14:30	4× (yellow card) 6× (suspension) 1× (red card)		3× (yellow card) 1× (suspension) 1× (red card)	The Dome, Sydney; Referees: Nachevski, Nachevski (MKD)

== Field hockey ==
Summary

Team	Event	Group Stage						Semifinal	Final / BM	
Team	Event	Opposition Score	Opposition Score	Opposition Score	Opposition Score	Opposition Score	Rank	Opposition Score	Opposition Score	Rank
South Korea men's	Men's tournament	Spain; D 1–1	Argentina; D 2–2	India; W 2–0	Poland; W 3–2	Australia; L 1–2	2 Q	Pakistan; W 1–0	Netherlands; L 3–3 (OT); Pens: 4–5	2nd place, silver medalist(s)
South Korea women's	Women's tournament	Argentina; L 2–3	Spain; D 0–0	Great Britain; D 2–2	Australia; L 0–3	—N/a	5	7th-10th place classification game Germany; L 2–3	Ninth place game South Africa; W 3–0	9

=== Men's tournament ===
Team roster

- Kim Yoon (gk)
- Ji Seong-hwan (gk)
- Seo Jong-ho
- Kim Chel-hwan
- Kim Yong-bae
- Han Hyung-bae
- Kim Kyung-seok
- Kim Jung-chul
- Song Seung-tae
- Kang Keon-wook
- Hwang Jong-hyun
- Lim Jung-woo
- Jeon Jong-ha
- Jeon Hong-kwon
- Yeo Woon-kon
- Lim Jong-chun
- Head coach: Kim Sang-ryul

Group play

Pos	Team	Pld	W	D	L	GF	GA	GD	Pts	Qualification
1	Australia (H)	5	3	2	0	12	6	+6	11	Semi-finals
2	South Korea	5	2	2	1	9	7	+2	8	Semi-finals
3	India	5	2	2	1	9	7	+2	8	
4	Argentina	5	1	2	2	13	13	0	5	
5	Poland	5	1	2	2	12	14	−2	5	
6	Spain	5	0	2	3	7	15	−8	2	

Source: FIH
(H) Hosts

16 September 2000
15:30

Spain	1–1	South Korea
Amat 2'	Report	Song 29'

Umpires:
Peter von Reth (NED)
Sumesh Putra (CAN)

19 September 2000
18:30

Argentina	2–2	South Korea
Lombi 5', 67'	Report	Yeo 7'; Ji 63'

Umpires:
Sumesh Putra (CAN)
Richard Wolter (GER)

21 September 2000
08:30

South Korea	2–0	India
Song 28'; Kang 42'	Report

Umpires:
Ray O'Connor (IRL)
Peter von Roth (NED)

24 September 2000
21:00

Poland	2–3	South Korea
Grotowski 53'; Mikuła 62'	Report	Yeo 11'; Kang 18'; Hwang 37'

Umpires:
Christian Siebrecht (GER)
Jason McCracken (NZL)

26 September 2000
13:30

Australia	2–1	South Korea
Victory 35+'; Stacy 62'	Report	Song 8'

Umpires:
Peter von Roth (NED)
Richard Wolter (GER)

Semifinal

28 September 2000
14:00

Pakistan	0–1	South Korea
	Report	Song 57'

Umpires:
Peter von Reth (NED)
Christian Siebrecht (GER)

Gold medal game

30 September 2000
20:00

South Korea	3–3 (a.e.t.)	Netherlands
Song 9'; Kim K. 66'; Kang 66'	Report	Veen 20', 36', 64'
Penalties
Jeon J. (penalty shoot-out scored); Yeo (penalty shoot-out scored); Song (penalty shoot-out missed); Kim K. (penalty shoot-out scored); Kang (penalty shoot-out scored)	4–5	(penalty shoot-out scored) Lomans; (penalty shoot-out scored) Geeris; (penalty shoot-out scored) Van Pelt; (penalty shoot-out scored) Eikelboom; (penalty shoot-out scored) Veen

Umpires:
Christian Siebrecht (GER)
Santiago Deo (ESP)

=== Women's team competition ===
Team roster

- (01.) Park Yong-sook (gk)
- (06.) Lee Sun-hwa
- (07.) Kim Eun-jin
- (08.) Kim Mi-hyun
- (09.) Shin Mi-kyung
- (10.) Bang Jin-hyuk
- (11.) Kim Seong-eun
- (12.) im Soo-jung
- (13.) Oh Seung-shin
- (14.) Kim Myung-ok
- (15.) Lee Eun-young
- (16.) Jung Hang-joo (gk)
- (17.) Park Eun-kyung
- (18.) Cho Bo-ra
- (19.) Yoo Hee-joo
- (27.) Oh Ko-woon

Group play

Pos	Team	Pld	W	D	L	GF	GA	GD	Pts	Qualification
1	Australia	4	3	1	0	9	3	+6	10	Medal round
2	Argentina	4	2	0	2	5	6	−1	6	Medal round
3	Spain	4	1	2	1	2	3	−1	5	Medal round
4	Great Britain	4	1	1	2	5	5	0	4	
5	South Korea	4	0	2	2	4	8	−4	2	

Source: FIH
Rules for classification: 1) Points; 2) Matches won; 3) Goal difference; 4) Goals for; 5) Head-to-head result.

16 September 2000
08:30

South Korea	2–3	Argentina
Shin 20'; Cho 33'	Report	Masotta 9'; Aymar 44'; Rimoldi 68'

Umpires:
Gina Spitaleri (ITA)
Miriam van Gemert (NED)

17 September 2000
18:30

South Korea	0–0	Spain
	Report

Umpires:
Lyn Farrell (NZL)
Jean Buchanan (RSA)

20 September 2000
10:30

South Korea	2–2	Great Britain
Kim Se. 14'; Kim E. 48'	Report	Clewlow 57'; Nicholson 66'

Umpires:
Ute Conen (GER)
Jean Buchanan (RSA)

22 September 2000
15:30

Australia	3–0	South Korea
Powell 8'; Peek 22'; Hudson 70+'	Report

Umpires:
Renee Cohen (NED)
Ute Conen (GER)

7th-10th place classification game

25 September 2000
15:30

South Korea	2–3 (a.e.t.)	Germany
Lee E. 56'; Kim E. 59'	Report	Becker 8', 41'; Ernsting-Krienke 80'

Umpires:
Michele Arnold (USA)
Jean Buchanan (RSA)

Ninth place game

27 September 2000
08:30

South Africa	0–3	South Korea
	Report	Kim E. 23', 26'; Yoo 35+'

Umpires:
Michele Arnold (AUS)
Renee Cohen (NED)

== Judo ==
Men

Athlete	Event	First round	Round of 32	Round of 16	Quarterfinals	Semifinals	Repechage 1	Repechage 2	Repechage 3	Final / BM	
Athlete	Event	Opposition Result	Opposition Result	Opposition Result	Opposition Result	Opposition Result	Opposition Result	Opposition Result	Opposition Result	Opposition Result	Rank
Jung Bu-Kyung	Men's 60 kg	Bye	Khegiani (GEO); W 1110–0001	Narmandakh (MGL); W 1020–0001	Donbay (KAZ); W 1001–0000	Mukhtarov (UZB); W 0010–0000	Bye			Nomura (JPN); L 0000–1000	2nd place, silver medalist(s)
Han Ji-hwan	Men's 66 kg	Benboudaoud (FRA); L 0000–1010	—N/a				Somerville (GBR); W 1001–0000	Uematsu (ESP); W 0010–0001	Vazagashvili (GEO); L 0010–1100	Did not advance	
Choi Yong-sin	Men's 73 kg	Sadykov (KGZ); W 1001–0000	Pedro (USA); W 0010–0001	Alquati (ARG); W 0110–0001	Nakamura (JPN); W 1010–0001	Camilo (BRA); L 0001–1000	—N/a			Zelonijs (LAT); L 0000–1000	5
Cho In-chul	Men's 81 kg	Bye	Figueroa (PUR); W 1110–0001	Wanner (GER); W 1001–0000	Budõlin (EST); W 0100–0020	Delgado (POR); W 0110–0100	Bye			Takimoto (JPN); L 0001–0021	2nd place, silver medalist(s)
Yoo Sung-yeon	Men's 90 kg	Bye	Muradov (UZB); W 1001–0001	Costa (ARG); L 0100–1021	Did not advance						
Jang Sung-ho	Men's 100 kg	Bye	Belgroun (ALG); L 0111–1000	Did not advance							
Ko Kyung-doo	Men's +100kg	Bye	van Barneveld (BEL); L 0001–1100	Did not advance							

Women

Athlete	Event	Round of 32	Round of 16	Quarterfinals	Semifinals	Repechage 1	Repechage 2	Repechage 3	Final / BM	
Athlete	Event	Opposition Result	Opposition Result	Opposition Result	Opposition Result	Opposition Result	Opposition Result	Opposition Result	Opposition Result	Rank
Park Sung-Ja	Women's 48 kg	Moise (ROM); L	Did not advance							
Jang Jae-Sim	Women's 52 kg	Bye	Narazaki (JPN); L	—N/a		Baillargeon (CAN); L	Did not advance			
Jung Sung-Sook	Women's 63 kg	Vandenhende (FRA); L	—N/a			Roberge (CAN); W	Schutz (USA); W	Dhahri (TUN); W	Gal (ITA); W	3rd place, bronze medalist(s)
Cho Min-Sun	Women's 70 kg	Bye	Scapin (ITA); W	Kuzina (RUS); W	Veranes (CUB); L	—N/a			Werbrouck (BEL); W	3rd place, bronze medalist(s)
Lee So-yeon	Women's 78 kg	Bye	Kühnen (GER); W	Lebrun (FRA); L	—N/a		San Miguel (ESP); W	Richter (ROM); L	Did not advance	
Kim Seon-young	Women's +78kg	Beltran (CUB); L	—N/a			Curren (AUS); W	Oliver (BEL); W	Rodina (RUS); W	Koppen (GER); W	3rd place, bronze medalist(s)

== Rowing ==
Men

Athlete	Event	Heats		Repechage		Semifinals		Final	
Athlete	Event	Time	Rank	Time	Rank	Time	Rank	Time	Rank
Lee In-su	Single sculls	7:53.84	6 R	7:45.76	5 SC/D	7:40.03	6 FD	7:37.31	21

Women

Athlete	Event	Heats		Repechage		Semifinals		Final	
Athlete	Event	Time	Rank	Time	Rank	Time	Rank	Time	Rank
Im Jin-myeong; Mun Hae-yeong	Lightweight double sculls	8:00.45	6 R	7:55.74	5 FC	—N/a		7:42.07	17

== Sailing ==
Korea competed in four sailing events at the 2000 Olympics.

Athlete	Event	Race											Net points	Final rank
Athlete	Event	1	2	3	4	5	6	7	8	9	10	M*	Net points	Final rank
Ok Duck-pil	Men's Mistral	21	~~28~~	12	4	16	18	14	24	20	23	~~25~~	152	21
Jung Sung-ahn; Kim Dae-young	Men's 470	16	16	13	10	16	17	13	~~30~~	~~20~~	12	12	125	15
Ju Sun-an	Women's Mistral	12	11	6	16	~~18~~	14	16	14	7	~~19~~	14	110	13
Kim Ho-kon	Laser	23	15	26	28	~~34~~	~~37~~	28	20	15	7	19	181	26

== Shooting ==
Eight South Korean shooters (four men and nfour women) qualified to compete in the following events:

Men

Athlete	Event	Qualification		Final	
Athlete	Event	Points	Rank	Points	Rank
Jeon Chan-sik	Skeet	119	23	Did not advance	
Lee Eun-chul	50 m rifle prone	587	41	Did not advance	
Lee Eun-chul	50 m rifle 3 positions	1160	18	Did not advance	
Lee Eun-chul	10 m air rifle	588	18	Did not advance	
Bae Sung-duk	50 m rifle prone	588	38	Did not advance	
Bae Sung-duk	50 m rifle 3 positions	1157	25	Did not advance	
Lim Young-sueb	10 m air rifle	590	11	Did not advance	

Women

Athlete	Event	Qualification		Final	
Athlete	Event	Points	Rank	Points	Rank
Song Ji-yeong	10 m air pistol	379	20	Did not advance	
Song Ji-yeong	25 m pistol	576	18	Did not advance	
Kang Cho-hyun	10 m air rifle	397 EO	1 Q	497.5	2nd place, silver medalist(s)
Choi Dae-young	10 m air rifle	395	4 Q	493.1	7
Boo Soon-hee	10 m air pistol	377	24	Did not advance	
Boo Soon-hee	25 m pistol	573	25	Did not advance	

== Swimming ==
Men

Athlete	Event	Heat		Semifinal		Final	
Athlete	Event	Time	Rank	Time	Rank	Time	Rank
Kim Min-suk	50m freestyle	22.82 NR	17	Did not advance			
Kim Min-suk	100m freestyle	50.49	24	Did not advance			
Woo Chul	200m freestyle	1:53.02	29	Did not advance			
Woo Chul	400m freestyle	3:58.31	27	Did not advance			
Cho Sung-mo	1500m freestyle	15:50.45	33	Did not advance			
Sung Min	100m backstroke	57.12	31	Did not advance			
Lee Jong-min	200m backstroke	2:07.14	39	Did not advance			
Joe Kyong-fan	100m breaststroke	1:04.71	45	Did not advance			
Joe Kyong-fan	200m breaststroke	2:19.16 NR	29	Did not advance			
Han Kyu-chul	200m butterfly	1:59.85	19	Did not advance			
Han Kyu-chul	200m individual medley	2:06.42	33	Did not advance			
Kim Bang-hyun	400m individual medley	4:28.56	33	Did not advance			

Women

Athlete	Event	Heat		Semifinal		Final	
Athlete	Event	Time	Rank	Time	Rank	Time	Rank
Chang Hee-jin	50m freestyle	26.88	41	Did not advance			
Chang Hee-jin	100m freestyle	58.77	40	Did not advance			
Roh Joo-hee	200m freestyle	2:07.21	33	Did not advance			
Roh Joo-hee	400m freestyle	4:25.66	37	Did not advance			
Shim Min-ji	100m backstroke	1:03.20 NR	19	Did not advance			
Choi Soo-min	200m backstroke	2:26.42	35	Did not advance			
Byun Hye-young	100m breaststroke	1:11.64	25	Did not advance			
Ku Hyo-jin	200m breaststroke	2:28.21 NR	11 Q	2:28.50	6	Did not advance	
Lee Bo-eun	100m butterfly	1:02.22	35	Did not advance			
Nam Yoo-sun	200m individual medley	2:22.53	27	Did not advance			
Lee Ji-hyun	400m individual medley	4:58.94	23	Did not advance			
Chang Hee-jin; Ku Hyo-jin; Lee Bo-eun; Shim Min-ji	4 × 100 m medley relay	4:16.93	17	Did not advance			

== Synchronized swimming ==
Athlete	Event	Technical routine		Free routine (preliminary)				Free routine (final)		Total	
Athlete	Event	Points	Rank	Points	Rank	Total	Rank	Points	Rank	Points	Rank
Jang Yun-gyeong; Yu Na-mi	Duet	92.000	10	92.200	10	92.130	10 Q	91.733	11	91.826	11

== Table tennis ==
Men

Athlete	Event	Group stage			Round of 32	Round of 16	Quarterfinals	Semifinals	Final / BM	
Athlete	Event	Opposition Result	Opposition Result	Rank	Opposition Result	Opposition Result	Opposition Result	Opposition Result	Opposition Result	Rank
Kim Taek-soo	Singles	Bye			Boll (GER); L 1–3	Did not advance				
Lee Chul-seung	Singles	Akinlabi (NGR); W 3–0	Grujić (YUG); W 3–2	1 Q	Éloi (FRA); L 1–3	Did not advance				
Ryu Seung-min	Singles	Leung (HKG); W 3–0	Smythe (AUS); W 3–0	1 Q	Legoût (FRA); L 2–3	Did not advance				
Kim Taek-soo; Oh Sang-eun	Doubles	Bye			—N/a	Grujić / Lupulesku (YUG); W 3–0	Kong / Liu (CHN); L 1–3	Did not advance		
Lee Chul-seung; Ryu Seung-min	Doubles	Bye			—N/a	Cheung / Leung (HKG); W 3–2	Chang / Chiang (TPE); W 3–2	Wang / Yan (CHN); L 1–3	Bronze medal match Chila / Gatien (FRA); L 1–3	4

Women

Athlete	Event	Group stage			Round of 32	Round of 16	Quarterfinals	Semifinals	Final / BM	
Athlete	Event	Opposition Result	Opposition Result	Rank	Opposition Result	Opposition Result	Opposition Result	Opposition Result	Opposition Result	Rank
Lee Eun-sil	Singles	Banh (USA); W 3–0	Wang (CAN); W 3–0	1 Q	Koyama (JPN); L 0–3	Did not advance				
Ryu Ji-hye	Singles	Bye			Jun (USA); W 3–1	Konishi (JPN); W 3–2	Li (CHN); L 1–3	Did not advance		
Seok Eun-mi	Singles	Bye			Bădescu (ROU); W 3–2	Gotsch (GER); L 2–3	Did not advance			
Kim Moo-kyo; Ryu Ji-hye	Doubles	Bye			—N/a	Konishi / Fujinuma (JPN); W 3–0	Bădescu / Steff (ROU); W 3–2	Li / Wang (CHN); L 2–3	Bronze medal game Bátorfi / Tóth (HUN); W 3–2	3rd place, bronze medalist(s)
Lee Eun-sil; Seok Eun-mi	Doubles	Bye			—N/a	Kostromina / Pavlovich (BLR); W 3–0	Bátorfi / Tóth (HUN); L 0–3	Did not advance		

== Taekwondo ==
Athlete	Event	Round of 16	Quarterfinals	Semifinals	Repechage Quarterfinals	Repechage Semifinals	Final / BM	
Athlete	Event	Opposition Result	Opposition Result	Opposition Result	Opposition Result	Opposition Result	Opposition Result	Rank
Sin Joon-sik	Men's –68 kg	Çalışkan (AUT); W 7–3	Dzitiyev (RUS); W 9–1	Saei (IRI); W 5–3	—N/a		López (USA); L 0–1	2nd place, silver medalist(s)
Kim Kyong-hun	Men's +80 kg	Al-Dosari (KSA); W 5–0	Delgado (NCA); W 5–0	Gentil (FRA); W 6–2	—N/a		Trenton (AUS); W 6–2	1st place, gold medalist(s)
Jung Jae-eun	Women's –57 kg	Bye	Corsi (ITA); W 8–1	Bıkçın (TUR); W 3–2	—N/a		Trần (VIE); W 2–0	1st place, gold medalist(s)
Lee Sun-hee	Women's –67 kg	Bye	Koskinen (FIN); W 5–1	Müskens (NED); W 4–1	—N/a		Gundersen (NOR); W 6–3	1st place, gold medalist(s)

== Tennis ==
Athlete	Event	Round of 64	Round of 32	Round of 16	Quarterfinals	Semifinals	Final / BM	
Athlete	Event	Opposition Result	Opposition Result	Opposition Result	Opposition Result	Opposition Result	Opposition Result	Rank
Lee Hyung-taik	Men's singles	Ferrero (ESP); L 7–6^{5}, 6^{6}–7, 5–7	Did not advance					
Lee Hyung-taik; Yoon Yong-il	Men's doubles	—N/a	Massú / Ríos (CHI); W 6–3, 6–4	Haas / Prinosil (GER); L 4–6, 5–7	Did not advance			
Cho Yoon-jeong; Park Sung-hee	Women's doubles	—N/a	Habšudová / Husárová (SVK); L 5–7, 7–6^{2}, 4–6	Did not advance				

== Volleyball ==
Summary

Team	Event	Group Stage						Quarterfinal	Semifinal	Final / BM	
Team	Event	Opposition Score	Opposition Score	Opposition Score	Opposition Score	Opposition Score	Rank	Opposition Score	Opposition Score	Opposition Score	Rank
South Korea women's	Men's tournament	Italy; L 0–3	Argentina; L 1–3	Russia; L 2–3	United States; W 3–2	Yugoslavia; L 2–3	5	Did not advance			
South Korea women's	Women's tournament	Italy; W 3–2	Germany; W 3–0	Cuba; L 0–3	Peru; W 3–1	Russia; L 0–3	3 Q	United States; L 2–3	Classification Round 5–8; China; L 1–3	Seventh place match Croatia; L 1–3	8

=== Men's tournament ===
Team roster
- Bang Ji-sub
- Bang Sin-bong
- Chang Byung-chul
- Choi Tae-woong
- Kim Se-jin
- Lee Byung-yong
- Lee Ho
- Lee Kyung-soo
- Park Hee-sang
- Sin Jin-sik
- Shin Sun-ho
- Who In-jung

Group play

Pos	Team	Pld	W	L	Pts	SW	SL	SR	SPW	SPL	SPR	Qualification
1	Italy	5	5	0	10	15	4	3.750	482	421	1.145	Quarterfinals
2	Russia	5	4	1	9	13	7	1.857	465	443	1.050	Quarterfinals
3	FR Yugoslavia	5	3	2	8	12	9	1.333	489	461	1.061	Quarterfinals
4	Argentina	5	2	3	7	7	11	0.636	409	446	0.917	Quarterfinals
5	South Korea	5	1	4	6	8	14	0.571	491	504	0.974	
6	United States	5	0	5	5	5	15	0.333	417	478	0.872	

17 September 2000	South Korea	0–3	Italy	Sydney Showground Pavilion 4
17 September 2000	(25–27, 23–25, 18–25)			Sydney Showground Pavilion 4

19 September 2000	Argentina	3–1	South Korea	Sydney Showground Pavilion 4
19 September 2000	(25–23, 17–25, 30–28, 25–21)			Sydney Showground Pavilion 4

21 September 2000	South Korea	2–3	Russia	Sydney Entertainment Centre
21 September 2000	(22–25, 25–22, 25–20, 27–29, 15–17)			Sydney Entertainment Centre

23 September 2000; 18:30	South Korea	3–2	United States	Sydney Entertainment Centre; Attendance: 8,095; Referees: Bela Hobor (Hungary), Themistoklis Kalpaktsoglou (Greece)
23 September 2000; 18:30	(25–20, 25–27, 26–24, 21–25, 15–13)			Sydney Entertainment Centre; Attendance: 8,095; Referees: Bela Hobor (Hungary), Themistoklis Kalpaktsoglou (Greece)

25 September 2000	South Korea	2–3	FR Yugoslavia	Sydney Entertainment Centre
25 September 2000	(26–24, 20–25, 23–25, 25–19, 8–15)			Sydney Entertainment Centre

=== Women's tournament ===
Team roster
- Chang So-yun
- Choi Kwang-hee
- Chung Sun-hye
- Eoh Yeon-soon
- Kang Hye-mi
- Kim Guy-hyun
- Koo Ki-lan
- Ku Min-jung
- Lee Meong-hee
- Lee Yun-hui
- Park Mee-kyung
- Park Soo-jeong

- Head coach: Kim Cheol-yong

Group play

Pos	Team	Pld	W	L	Pts	SW	SL	SR	SPW	SPL	SPR	Qualification
1	Russia	5	5	0	10	15	5	3.000	465	392	1.186	Quarterfinals
2	Cuba	5	4	1	9	14	4	3.500	419	332	1.262	Quarterfinals
3	South Korea	5	3	2	8	9	9	1.000	393	413	0.952	Quarterfinals
4	Germany	5	2	3	7	8	10	0.800	380	395	0.962	Quarterfinals
5	Italy	5	1	4	6	7	12	0.583	427	446	0.957	
6	Peru	5	0	5	5	2	15	0.133	316	422	0.749	

16 September 2000; 18:30	South Korea	3–2	Italy	Sydney Entertainment Centre
16 September 2000; 18:30	(23–25, 25–18, 25–22, 22–25, 27–25); Report			Sydney Entertainment Centre

18 September 2000; 12:30	Germany	0–3	South Korea	Sydney Entertainment Centre
18 September 2000; 12:30	(16–25, 21–25, 22–25); Report			Sydney Entertainment Centre

20 September 2000; 12:30	South Korea	0–3	Cuba	Sydney Entertainment Centre
20 September 2000; 12:30	(17–25, 13–25, 15–25); Report			Sydney Entertainment Centre

22 September 2000; 12:30	South Korea	3–1	Peru	Sydney Entertainment Centre
22 September 2000; 12:30	(19–25, 25–19, 30–28, 25–17); Report			Sydney Entertainment Centre

24 September 2000; 20:30	Russia	3–0	South Korea	Sydney Entertainment Centre
24 September 2000; 20:30	(25–15, 25–21, 25–16); Report			Sydney Entertainment Centre

Quarterfinal

26 September 2000; 20:30	United States	3–2	South Korea	Sydney Entertainment Centre; Attendance: 7,496; Referees: Jarmo Salonen (Finland), Paolo Porcari (Italy)
26 September 2000; 20:30	(26–24, 17–25, 25–23, 25–27, 16–14); Report			Sydney Entertainment Centre; Attendance: 7,496; Referees: Jarmo Salonen (Finland), Paolo Porcari (Italy)

Classification round 5th-8th place

27 September 2000; 12:20	South Korea	1–3	China	Sydney Showground Pavilion 4
27 September 2000; 12:20	(25–23, 19–25, 23–25, 19–25); Report			Sydney Showground Pavilion 4

Seventh place match

28 September 2000; 12:30	Croatia	3–1	South Korea	Sydney Entertainment Centre
28 September 2000; 12:30	(25–18, 24–26, 25–22, 25–21); Report			Sydney Entertainment Centre

== Weightlifting ==
Men

Athlete	Event	Snatch		Clean & Jerk		Total	
Athlete	Event	Weight	Rank	Weight	Rank	Weight	Rank
Hwang Gyu-dong	–56 kg	115.0	10	152.5	6	267.5	10
Kim Young-tae	–62 kg	120.0	16	155.0	12	275.0	14
Kim Hak-bong	–69 kg	147.5	6	182.5	7	330.0	8
Lee Bae-young	–69 kg	142.5	11	187.5	2	330.0	7
Choi Jong-kun	–105 kg	DNF					
Kim Tae-hyun	+105 kg	200.0	6	260.0 OR	1	460.0	5

Women

Athlete	Event	Snatch		Clean & Jerk		Total	
Athlete	Event	Weight	Rank	Weight	Rank	Weight	Rank
Kim Soon-hee	–75 kg	105.0	4	135.0	3	240.0	4
Moon Kyung-ae	+75 kg	110.0	7	135.0	6	245.0	7

== Wrestling ==
Key:

- TO – Victory by Fall.
- SP – Decision by technical superiority (10 points difference) – the loser with technical points
- ST – Decision by technical superiority (10 points difference) – the loser without technical points
- PP – Decision by Points – the loser with technical points.
- PO – Decision by Points – the loser without technical points.
- VA – Victory by injury.

Greco-Roman

Athlete	Event	Elimination pool				Quarterfinals	Semifinals	Final / BM	
Athlete	Event	Opposition Result	Opposition Result	Opposition Result	Rank	Opposition Result	Opposition Result	Opposition Result	Rank
Sim Kwon-ho	–54 kg	Assembekov (KAZ); W 3–1^{PP}	Jabłoński (POL); W 4–0^{ST}	—N/a	1 Q	Ter-Mkrtchyan (GER); W 3–1^{PP}	Kang (PRK); W 4–0^{ST}	Rivas (CUB); W 3–0^{PO}	1st place, gold medalist(s)
Kim In-sub	–58 kg	Melnichenko (KAZ); W 3–0^{PO}	Aripov (UZB); W 3–1^{PP}	—N/a	1 Q	Ashkani (IRI); W 3–1^{PP}	Sheng (CHN); W 3–0^{PO}	Nazaryan (BUL); L 0–4^{TO}	2nd place, silver medalist(s)
Choi Sang-sun	–63 kg	Bracken (USA); L 1–3^{PP}	Magni (ITA); W 3–1^{PP}	—N/a	2	Did not advance			
Son Sang-pil	–69 kg	Juretzko (GER); W 4–0^{ST}	Schoberg (SWE); W 3–0^{PO}	—N/a	1 Q	Azcuy (CUB); L 1–3^{PP}	Did not advance	Fifth place bout Dugushiev (AZE); W 4–0^{PA}	5
Kim Jin-soo	–76 kg	Avluca (TUR); W 3–1^{PP}	Bichinashvili (AZE); W 3–1^{PP}	—N/a	1 Q	Yli-Hannuksela (FIN); L 0–3^{PO}	Did not advance	Fifth place bout Abrahamian (SWE); W 3–0^{PO}	5
Park Woo	–97 kg	Thanos (GRE); L 0–3^{PO}	Bürgler (SUI); L 0–3^{PO}	Vincent (AUS); W 4–0^{ST}	3	Did not advance			

Freestyle

Athlete	Event	Elimination pool				Quarterfinals	Semifinals	Final / BM	
Athlete	Event	Opposition Result	Opposition Result	Opposition Result	Rank	Opposition Result	Opposition Result	Opposition Result	Rank
Moon Myung-seok	–54 kg	Henson (USA); L 0–4^{ST}	Tanabe (JPN); L 1–3^{PP}	—N/a	3	Did not advance			
Jang Jae-sung	–63 kg	Afandiyev (AZE); W 3–1^{PP}	Fernyák (SVK); W 4–1^{SP}	Ilhan (AUS); W 4–0^{ST}	1 Q	Bye	Umakhanov (RUS); L 1–3^{PP}	Bronze medal bout Talaei (IRI); W 4–1^{SP}	3rd place, bronze medalist(s)
Moon Eui-jae	–76 kg	Muzaiev (UKR); W 3–1^{PP}	Jurecki (POL); W 3–1^{PP}	Ozoline (AUS); W 4–0^{ST}	1 Q	Bye	Leipold (GER); L 1–3^{PP}	Bronze medal bout Bereket (TUR); W 4–0^{TO}	2nd place, silver medalist(s)
Yang Hyung-mo	–85 kg	Khadartsev (UZB); W 3–1^{PP}	Özen (TUR); W 3–1^{PP}	—N/a	1 Q	Saitiev (RUS); L 0–3^{PO}	Did not advance	Fifth place bout Burton (USA); L 0–4^{PA}	6

== See also ==
- South Korea at the 2000 Summer Paralympics

== Notes ==
- Wallechinsky, David (2004). The Complete Book of the Summer Olympics (Athens 2004 Edition). Toronto, Canada. ISBN 1-894963-32-6.
- International Olympic Committee (2001). The Results. Retrieved 12 November 2005.
- Sydney Organising Committee for the Olympic Games (2001). Official Report of the XXVII Olympiad Volume 1: Preparing for the Games. Retrieved 20 November 2005.
- Sydney Organising Committee for the Olympic Games (2001). Official Report of the XXVII Olympiad Volume 2: Celebrating the Games. Retrieved 20 November 2005.
- Sydney Organising Committee for the Olympic Games (2001). The Results. Retrieved 20 November 2005.
- International Olympic Committee Website
