= Kim Tae-gyun =

Kim Tae-gyun or Kim Tae-kyun may refer to:

- Kim Tae-kyun (director) (born 1960), South Korean film director
- Kim Tae-gyun (baseball, born 1971), South Korean baseball player and Olympic bronze medalist who plays for SK Wyverns
- Kim Tae-gyun (comedian) (born 1972), South Korean comedian
- Kim Tae-kyun (baseball, born 1982), South Korean baseball player who plays for Hanwha Eagles
