= Kim Soo-kyung =

Kim Soo-kyung may refer to:

- Kim Soo-kyung (baseball) (born 1979), South Korean male baseball player
- Kim Soo-kyung (weightlifter) (born 1985), South Korean female weightlifter
