= Baseball at the 1900 Summer Olympics =

A game of baseball was played on September 20, 1900, as part of the 1900 Exposition Universelle in conjunction with the 1900 Olympic Games program, though it is not regarded as an official event of the Games, with Olympic historian Bill Mallon calling it "basically only an exhibition organized by some Americans in Paris".

Little is known about the players involved, other than it was between two American teams: one from the admiral guard corps of the United States Commission, and one from the publisher's building in the Exposition. The Commission team defeated the publisher's building team by 19 runs to 9.
