= Ferenc Jongejan =

Dutch baseball player (born 1978)

- Pitcher
- Born: 20 October 1978 (age 47); Hoorn, Netherlands
- Bats: Left Throws: Left
- Stats at Baseball Reference

Ferenc Peter Jongejan (born 20 October 1978) is a Dutch former professional baseball player. He pitched for the Netherlands in the 2000 and 2004 Summer Olympics and in Minor League Baseball from 2001 to 2004. He coached the Netherlands women's national softball team and works for the Royal Netherlands Baseball and Softball Federation.

== Playing career ==
Jongejan played college baseball for the Lindenwood Lions and North Alabama Lions. Before signing professionally in the United States, he pitched for Twins Oosterhout and Pioniers in the Dutch Honkbal Hoofdklasse.

Jongejan signed with the Chicago Cubs after impressing a scout at the 2000 Summer Olympics. He played Minor League Baseball in the Cubs' farm system between 2001 and 2004 with the Lansing Lugnuts, West Tenn Diamond Jaxx, Iowa Cubs and Daytona Cubs. He suffered a back injury in 2003. He pitched for Neptunus in the Netherlands in 2004, winning the Holland Series. He then dealt with more injuries, ending his playing career.

== International career ==
Manager Pat Murphy selected Jongejan for the Netherlands national team at the 2000 Summer Olympics in Sydney. Murphy had difficulty saying Jongejan's name, so he called the pitcher "Frankie Johnson". The Dutch team finished fifth, with Jongejan striking out Dave Nilsson of Australia and earning a save. Jongejan had 2 saves over four games, allowing 2 runs in 5 1/3 innings. Four years later at the 2004 Summer Olympics in Athens, they were sixth. He threw 4 1/3 scoreless innings.

== Coaching career ==
In October 2012, Jongejan became the manager of UVV Utrecht in the Honkbal Hoofdklasse. During the 2014 season, he played in one game for his team. He left the team after the 2016 season.

In 2017, he became an assistant coach for Dutch women's softball team at Terrasvogels, then was the team's head coach in 2018. After one season at the helm, he became the pitching coach of the Netherlands women's national softball team. He became the national team's manager in November 2019. After the 2024 World Cup, he became a technical director for softball at the Royal Netherlands Baseball and Softball Federation.
