= List of KBO career saves leaders =

The following is the current leaderboard for career saves in KBO League Korean baseball.

== Players with 100 or more saves ==
**Bold**	denotes active player. (Note: A player is considered inactive if he has announced his retirement or not played for a full season.)

- Stats updated at the end of the 2026 season.

Rank	Player	Saves
1	Oh Seung-hwan	427
2	Son Seung-lak	271
3	Lim Chang-yong	258
4	**Kim Jae-yoon**	228 (↑35)
5	Kim Yong-soo	227
6	Koo Dae-sung	214
7	Jung Woo-ram	197
8	Jin Pil-jung	191
9	**Lee Yong-chan**	174 (↑1)
10	**Kim Won-jung**	169 (↑5)
11	Cho Kyu-je	153
12	**Jung Hai-young**	150 (↑2)
13	Jeong Myeong-won	142
14	**Go Woo-suk**	140 (↑1)
15	Jung Jae-hoon	139
16	Sun Dong-yeol	132
17	Lim Chang-min	123
18	Bong Jung-keun	109
19	Chong Tae-hyon	106
20	Song Jin-woo	103
21	Kwon Yeong-ho	100

== See also ==
- List of KBO career strikeout leaders
- List of KBO career win leaders
- List of KBO career home run leaders
- List of KBO career RBI leaders
- List of KBO career stolen bases leaders
- List of KBO career hits leaders
