= Shane Heams =

American baseball player

Personal information
- Full name: Shane Timothy Heams
- Born: September 29, 1975 (age 50) Toledo, Ohio, U.S.
Medal record
Men's baseball
Representing the United States
Olympic Games
Gold medal – first place	2000 Sydney	Team competition

Shane Timothy Heams (born September 29, 1975) is an American former professional baseball pitcher and Olympic gold medalist. His minor league baseball career spanned from 1996 to 2005.

== Baseball career ==
Heams played baseball at Bedford High School in Temperance, Michigan, where he was named to the first team of the All-Great Lakes League team in 1993 and 1994 as an outfielder. After graduation, he was drafted in the 41st round of the 1994 Major League Baseball draft by the Seattle Mariners.

He played 22 games in the outfield for the minor league AZL Mariners in 1995, finishing the year with a .197 batting average. In 1996, the Mariners converted Heams to a pitcher, where he appeared in 30 games in relief in the Arizona League in 1996 and 1997. On March 31, 1998, Heams announced his retirement, but came out of retirement shortly thereafter and signed with the Detroit Tigers in April. He spent the remainder of the year with the Jamestown Jammers, ending the season with a 3.86 ERA in 24 games. He pitched for the West Michigan Whitecaps in 1999, where he was named to the Midwest League's East Division all-star team.

In November 1999, he was added to the Tigers' 40-man roster, with Heams signing a one-year contract with Detroit in February 2000. He pitched for both the Double-A Jacksonville Suns of the Southern League and the Triple-A Toledo Mud Hens of the International League in 2000, recording a 2.59 ERA with Double-A Jacksonville in 39 games, but allowed 12 earned runs in 9.2 innings with Toledo.

On August 23, Heams was named to the United States national baseball team to compete in the 2000 Summer Olympics. At the games, he pitched against Japan, The Netherlands, and Cuba. Heams earned a gold medal when the United States defeated Cuba in the finals.

Heams split the 2001 season between Double-A Erie and Toledo, appearing in 50 games across the two levels. He resigned with Detroit on a one-year deal the following February, but he was designated for assignment and claimed by the Boston Red Sox on April 2. He pitched for three of the Red Sox' minor league clubs, including the Triple-A Pawtucket Red Sox, but was traded to the Colorado Rockies in July. He appeared in nine games with the Colorado Springs Sky Sox before the season ended. In November, Heams signed with the Cincinnati Reds, but asked for his release after declining to take part in extended spring training.

After sitting out the 2003 season, Heams signed with the independent Somerset Patriots of the Atlantic League of Professional Baseball in April 2004. He appeared in 95 games in 2004 and 2005 for Somerset, including 12 games as a starter, before ending his playing career.
