= Clint Alfino =

South African baseball player (born 1968)

Clint Alfino (born 7 August 1968, in Cape Town) is a South African baseball player. Alfino competed for South Africa at the 2000 Summer Olympics, where he appeared in one game as the designated hitter (DH) and five games as the left fielder, going 2–14 in his plate appearances with one run scored.
