= John Cotton (baseball) =

- Utility player
- Born: October 30, 1970 (age 55); Houston, Texas, U.S.
- Bats: Left Throws: Right
- Stats at Baseball Reference
Medals
Men's baseball
Representing United States
Men's Olympics
Gold medal – first place	2000 Sydney	Team competition

John Cotton (born October 30, 1970) is an American former professional baseball player and an Olympic gold medalist in baseball. Cotton has played 15 seasons in minor league baseball, his last coming in 2003. Over his career, he has played in the Cleveland Indians organization (1989–1993), the San Diego Padres organization (1994–1995), the Detroit Tigers organization (1996), the Chicago White Sox organization (1997), the Chicago Cubs organization (1998), the Colorado Rockies organization (1999–2000), the Montreal Expos organization (2001), the Los Angeles Dodgers organization (2001), the Pittsburgh Pirates organization (2001), and independent league baseball (2002–2003). During the 2000 Sydney Olympic Games, Cotton won a gold medal as a member of the United States national baseball team. Cotton has batted .256 with 1361 hits, 237 doubles, 59 triples and 190 home runs in 1530 minor league games. On the defensive side, Cotton has played 457 career games at second base, 570 in the outfield, 162 games at third base, 191 at first base, 35 games at shortstop and one game at catcher.

== Professional career ==
Cotton was drafted by the Cleveland Indians in the tenth round of the 1989 Major League Baseball draft out of Angelina College. He began his professional career with the rookie-level Burlington Indians. With Burlington, Cotton batted .207 with 47 hits, five doubles, one triples, and two home runs in 64 games. In the field, Cotton played all 64 games at second base and committed 29 errors in 306 total chances. The next season, 1990, Cotton played for the Class-A Short Season Watertown Indians. In 73 games that season, Cotton batted .210 with 60 hits, nine doubles, four triples, and two home runs. He played all of his 73 games at second base, committing 26 errors in 364 total chances. In 1991, Cotton played for the Class-A Columbus Indians. With Columbus, Cotton batted .227 with 88 runs, 92 hits, 11 doubles, nine triples, 13 home runs, 42 runs batted in (RBIs) and 57 stolen bases in 122 games. Cotton was promoted to the Class-A Advanced Kinston Indians in 1992. With Kinston, Cotton batted .200 with 67 runs, 72 hits, seven doubles, three triples, 11 home runs, 39 RBIs, and 23 stolen bases in 103 games. Cotton stayed with Kinston in 1993 and batted .264 with 81 runs, 120 hits, 16 doubles, three RBIs, 13 home runs, 51 RBIs, 28 stolen bases, and 24 caught stealing in 127 games. Cotton primarily played in the outfield (125 games) in 1993, compared the previous seasons where he primarily played second base.

Cotton began playing in the San Diego Padres' organization in 1995. He played at three different levels in the Padres' organization with three different teams that season. The teams included the Class-A Springfield Sultans, the Class-A Advanced Rancho Cucamonga Quakes, and the Double-A Memphis Chicks. With the Sultans, Cotton batted .232 with 14 runs, 19 hits, five doubles, three triples, one home run, eight RBIs, and seven stolen bases in 24 games. At the Class-A Advanced level, he batted .205 with 35 runs, 35 hits, three doubles, two triples, four home runs, 19 RBIs, and nine stolen bases in 48 games.

== Other activities ==
Since retiring from professional baseball, Cotton trained to be an emergency medical technician. He also enrolled into the Sugar Land Fire Academy and later became a firefighter with the Sugar Land Fire Department.
