= Yuji Yoshimi =

Japanese baseball player

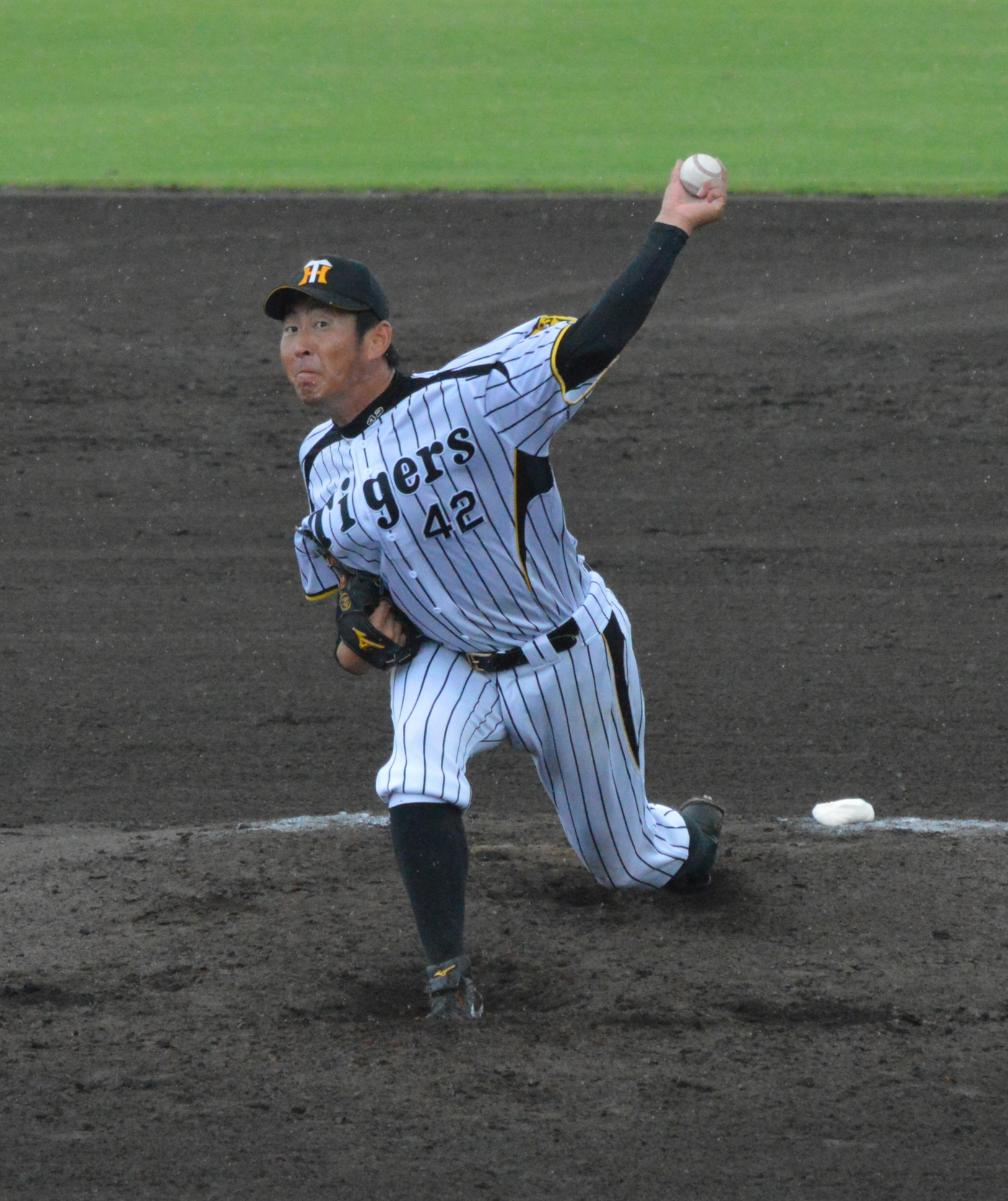
- Pitcher
- Born: May 21, 1978 (age 47)
- Bats: Left Throws: Left

NPB debut
- 2001, for the Yokohama BayStars

NPB statistics (through 2013)
- Win–loss record: 44-62
- ERA: 4.84
- Strikeouts: 717

Teams
- Yokohama BayStars (2001–2010); Chiba Lotte Marines (2010–2013)

Yuji Yoshimi (吉見 祐治, born May 21, 1978, in Wakayama, Wakayama) is a Japanese former professional baseball pitcher in Japan's Nippon Professional Baseball. He played with the Yokohama BayStars from 2001 to 2010 and for the Chiba Lotte Marines from 2010 to 2013. He also played for Team Japan at the 2000 Olympics.
