= Yobal Dueñas =

Cuban baseball player (born 1972)

Medal record

Men's baseball

Representing Cuba

Summer Olympics
| Silver medal – second place | 2000 Sydney | Team |

Baseball World Cup
| Gold medal – first place | 2001 Taipei | Team |

Intercontinental Cup
| Silver medal – second place | 1997 Barcelona | Team |
| Silver medal – second place | 1999 Sydney | Team |
| Gold medal – first place | 2002 Havana | Team |

Pan American Games
| Gold medal – first place | 1999 Winnipeg | Team |

Yobal Dueñas Martínez (born May 4, 1972, in Pinar del Río) is a Cuban baseball player. He has competed for the Cuba national baseball team in the Olympic Games, winning a silver medal. Dueñas played for the Cuba national team in the 1999 Baltimore Orioles–Cuba national baseball team exhibition series.

== Biographical Summaries ==
He was born on May 5, 1972, Player of the province of Pinar del Rio 188 cm height and 85 kg weight. Defender of the second base, but also ventured into the gardens, mainly in the central. Good right-handed hitter who participated in the 1990 Youth World Team debuted in Cuba, 2001 and 2003 World Cups, Intercontinental 1997, 1999 and 2002. Pan American 1999 and 2003 and 2000 Olympics. It was in the two games against the Baltimore Orioles in 1999.

=== National Series ===
Debuted in the 1989–1990 National Pinar del Rio, played for 14 seasons until retirement in 2003.

In 5025 he at-bats for 1615 average of 321 hits, 282 doubles, 136 homers and 133 stolen it. A defense in 6891 averaged 974 sets with 930 double plays billed.
