= Son Min-han =

South Korean baseball player

- Starting pitcher
- Born: January 2, 1975 (age 51)
- Batted: Right Threw: Right

KBO debut
- April 12, 1997, for the Lotte Giants

Last KBO appearance
- 2015, for the NC Dinos

KBO statistics
- Win–loss record: 123-88
- Earned run average: 3.55
- Strikeouts: 968
- Stats at Baseball Reference

Teams
- Lotte Giants (1997–2009); NC Dinos (2013–2015)

Career highlights and awards
- KBO MVP (2005); KBO League Golden Glove Award winner (2005)
Medals
Men's baseball
Olympic Games
Bronze medal – third place	2000 Sydney	Team
World Baseball Classic
Bronze medal – third place	2006 San Diego	Team
Silver medal – second place	2009 Los Angeles	Team

Son Min-han (Korean: 손민한; Hanja: 孫敏漢; born January 2, 1975, in Busan, South Korea) is a retired South Korean starting pitcher who played 15 seasons in the KBO League. He was a long-time member of the South Korea national baseball team, pitching in the 1994 Asian Games, the 1996 Summer Olympics, the 2000 Summer Olympics, the 2006 World Baseball Classic, and the 2009 World Baseball Classic. He batted and threw right-handed.

Son attended Busan High School and Korea University.

Son was a member of the South Korea national baseball team in the 1996 Summer Olympics, where they finished eighth in the baseball tournament. Four years later he was a member of the South Korean baseball team that won the bronze medal at the 2000 Summer Olympics.

Son led the KBO League in victories and earned run average in 2005, winning both the KBO League Most Valuable Player Award and the KBO League Golden Glove Award for a season in which he went 18-7, with a 2.46 ERA and 105 strikeouts.

He played for South Korea in both the 2006 World Baseball Classic and the 2009 World Baseball Classic.

Son didn't play in the KBO from 2010 to 2012. When he returned to the league, he signed with the NC Dinos, for whom he played until the 2015 season, when he was 40 years old.

== See also ==
- List of KBO career win leaders
