= Yovany Aragón =

Cuban baseball player

Medal record

Men's baseball

Representing Cuba

Olympic Games
Silver medal – second place	2000 Sydney	Team

Baseball World Cup
Gold medal – first place	1998 Italy	Team
Gold medal – first place	2003 Havana	Team

Pan American Games
Gold medal – first place	2003 Santo Domingo	Team

Central American and Caribbean Games
Gold medal – first place	1998 Maracaibo	Team

Yovany Aragon (born 2 May 1974) is a Cuban former baseball player, who starred for the Cuban national baseball team.

Aragon played for Cuba team in the 2000 Summer Olympic Games where his team won the silver medal.
