= Chang Hee-jin =

South Korean swimmer (born 1986)

Personal information
- National team: South Korea
- Born: 5 September 1986 (age 39) Seoul, South Korea
- Height: 1.71 m (5 ft 7 in)
- Weight: 60 kg (132 lb)

Sport
- Sport: Swimming
- Strokes: Freestyle
- College team: University of Texas (U.S.)
- Coach: Eddie Reese (U.S.)

- Chang Hee-jin
- Hangul: 장희진
- RR: Jang Huijin
- MR: Chang Hŭijin

Chang Hee-jin (Korean: 장희진; born September 5, 1986) is a South Korean former swimmer, who specialized in sprint freestyle events. She is a two-time Olympian (2000 and 2008), and a three-time All-American swimmer in the same stroke (50, 100, and 200 m). Chang is also a former varsity swimmer for the Texas Longhorns, and a graduate of political science at the University of Texas in Austin, Texas. Prior to her time with the Longhorns, she attended Phillips Academy in Andover, Massachusetts, where she was a 4-year varsity athlete and a formerly held various NEPSAC swimming records.

Chang made her Olympic debut, as South Korea's youngest swimmer (aged 14), at the 2000 Summer Olympics in Sydney. There, she failed to advance into the semifinals in any of her individual events, finishing fortieth in the 100 m freestyle (58.77), and forty-first in the 50 m freestyle (26.88). She also placed seventeenth, as a member of the South Korean team, in the 4 × 100 m medley relay (4:16.93).

After an eight-year absence, Chang competed only in two events at the 2008 Summer Olympics in Beijing. She achieved FINA B-standards of 25.78 (50 m freestyle) and 56.50 (100 m freestyle) from the Dong-A Swimming Tournament in Ulsan. In the 100 m freestyle, Chang challenged seven other swimmers in heat three, including 18-year-old Arianna Vanderpool-Wallace of the Bahamas. She posted a lifetime best of 55.96 to earn a fourth spot and thirty-second overall by 0.34 of a second behind Austria's Birgit Koschischek. In the 50 m freestyle, Chang placed thirty-first on the morning's preliminaries. Swimming in heat nine, she raced to fifth place by a hundredth of a second (0.01) behind Canada's Victoria Poon in 25.59.
