= Lee Seung-ho (baseball, born 1981) =

South Korean baseball player

Lee Seung-Ho
- Relief pitcher
- Born: September 9, 1981 (age 44)
- Batted: Left Threw: Left

KBO debut
- April 5, 2000, for the SK Wyverns

Last KBO appearance
- July 29, 2015, for the NC Dinos

KBO statistics
- Win–loss record: 75–69
- Earned run average: 3.94
- Strikeouts: 976
- Saves: 41
- Stats at Baseball Reference

Teams
- SK Wyverns (2000–2011); Lotte Giants (2012); NC Dinos (2013, 2015)

Career highlights and awards
- KBO Rookie of the Year (2000)
Medals
Men's baseball
Representing South Korea
Olympic Games
Bronze medal – third place	2000 Sydney	Team
World Baseball Classic
Silver medal – second place	2009 Los Angeles	Team

Lee Seung-Ho (Korean: 이승호; Hanja: 李承浩; born September 9, 1981 in Gunsan, North Jeolla Province, South Korea) is a South Korean former baseball relief pitcher for the SK Wyverns of the KBO League. He bats and throws left-handed.

Lee made his pro debut in 2000, and was named Rookie of the Year.

He was also a member of the South Korea national baseball team for the 2000 Olympic Games, where they won the bronze medal in the baseball tournament.

== Awards and honors ==
- 2000 Rookie of the Year
