= Gabriel Pierre =

Cuban baseball player

Medal record

Men's baseball

Representing Cuba

Olympic Games
Silver medal – second place	2000 Sydney	Team

Baseball World Cup
Gold medal – first place	1998 Rome	Team

Intercontinental Cup
Gold medal – first place	1991 Barcelona	Team
Silver medal – second place	1997 Barcelona	Team
Silver medal – second place	1999 Sydney	Team

Pan American Games
Gold medal – first place	1999 Winnipeg	Team

Central American and Caribbean Games
Gold medal – first place	1993 Ponce	Team
Gold medal – first place	1998 Maracaibo	Team

Gabriel Pierre Lazo (born May 29, 1966) is a Cuban baseball player and Olympic silver medalist.
