= Kim Ki-tai =

South Korean baseball player

Hanwha Eagles – No. 78
- Designated hitter / First baseman / Manager
- Born: May 23, 1969 (age 57); Gwangju, South Korea
- Batted: Left Threw: Left

KBO debut
- April 11, 1991, for the Ssangbangwool Raiders

Last appearance
- September 25, 2005, for the SK Wyverns

KBO statistics
- Batting average: .294
- Home runs: 249
- Runs batted in: 923
- Stats at Baseball Reference

Teams
- As player: Ssangbangwool Raiders (1991–1998); Samsung Lions (1999–2001); SK Wyverns (2002–2005); As coach: SK Wyverns (2006); Yomiuri Giants (2007–2009, 2021-present); LG Twins (2010–2011); Hanwha Eagles (2026–present); As manager: LG Twins (2012–2014); Kia Tigers (2015–2019)

Career highlights and awards
- 4× KBO League Golden Glove Award-winner (1992, 1993, 1994, 2004)
Medals
Representing South Korea
Olympic Games
Bronze medal – third place	2000 Sydney	Team

- Kim Ki-tai
- Hangul: 김기태
- Hanja: 金杞泰
- RR: Gim Gitae
- MR: Kim Kit'ae

Kim Ki-tai (Korean: 김기태; Hanja: 金杞泰; born May 23, 1969) is a former South Korean baseball player who played for the Ssangbangwool Raiders, Samsung Lions and SK Wyverns and is a former manager of Kia Tigers in the KBO League. He is generally considered as the KBO's best-ever designated hitter.

== Career ==
During his pro career, he was used primarily as a designated hitter, with occasional games at first base. As a full-time designated hitter, Kim won a home run title in 1994 and a batting title in 1997. He is a four-time KBO League Golden Glove Award-winner as well.

In 2000, Kim was a member of the 2000 South Korean Olympic baseball team which won the bronze medal in the baseball tournament.

Kim managed the LG Twins from 2012 to 2014. In late 2014, Kim became the manager of the Kia Tigers. In 2017, Kim successfully lead the team to Korean Series and was considered the best manager in the KBO League. On May 16, 2019, he resigned as manager.

== See also ==
- List of KBO career home run leaders
