= Jang Sung-ho (baseball) =

South Korean baseball player

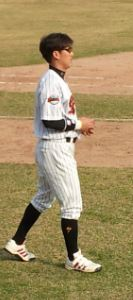
- First baseman / Outfielder
- Born: October 18, 1977 (age 47)
- Bats: Left Throws: Left

KBO debut
- 1996, for the Haitai Tigers

KBO statistics (through 2015)
- Batting average: .296
- Home runs: 221
- RBI: 1,043
- Hits: 2,100

Teams
- Haitai Tigers / Kia Tigers (1996–2010); Hanwha Eagles (2010–2012); Lotte Giants (2013–2014); KT Wiz (2015)

Career highlights and awards
- 3× Korean Series champion (1996, 1997, 2009)
Medals
Men's baseball
Representing South Korea
Bronze medal – third place	2000 Sydney	Team

- Jang Sung-ho
- Hangul: 장성호
- Hanja: 張成鎬
- RR: Jang Seongho
- MR: Chang Sŏngho

Jang Sung-ho (Korean: 장성호; Hanja: 張成鎬; born October 18, 1977, in Seoul, South Korea) is a South Korean retired first baseman/outfielder who played for the Lotte Giants of the KBO League. He won the batting title in the 2002 KBO league, and was a member of the South Korea national baseball team that won the bronze medal at the 2000 Summer Olympics. At the time of his retirement, he was second on the all-time KBO hit list, with 2,100.

== Achievements ==
- 2000 On-Base Percentage Leader
- 2002 Batting Title
- 2002 On-Base Percentage Leader
