= Kim Han-soo =

South Korean baseball player

- Third baseman / Coach
- Born: October 30, 1971 (age 54)
- Batted: Right Threw: Right

KBO debut
- 1994, for the Samsung Lions

Last appearance
- October 5, 2007, for the Samsung Lions

KBO statistics
- Batting average: .289
- Home runs: 149
- Runs batted in: 782
- Stats at Baseball Reference

Teams
- As player: Samsung Lions (1994–2007); As coach: Yomiuri Giants (2009); Samsung Lions (2008, 2010–2016); Doosan Bears (2023–2024); As manager: Samsung Lions (2017–2019)

Career highlights and awards
- 6× Golden Glove Award winner (1998, 1999, 2001, 2002, 2003, 2004); 3× Korean Series winner (2002, 2005, 2006)
Medals
Olympic Games
Bronze medal – third place	2000 Sydney	Team

- Kim Han-soo
- Hangul: 김한수
- Hanja: 金翰秀
- RR: Gim Hansu
- MR: Kim Hansu

Kim Han-soo (Korean: 김한수; Hanja: 金翰秀; born October 30, 1971, in Seoul, South Korea) was a South Korean baseball player and a manager of Samsung Lions. He was a member of the South Korean national baseball team which won the bronze medal in the baseball tournament of the 2000 Summer Olympics.
