= Park Jong-ho =

South Korean baseball player

LG Twins – No. 81
- Second baseman / Coach
- Born: 27 July 1973 (age 53); Seoul, South Korea
- Batted: Switch Threw: Right

KBO debut
- 9 May, 1992, for the LG Twins

Last appearance
- 2009, for the LG Twins

KBO statistics (through 2009)
- Batting average: .270
- Home runs: 71
- RBI: 584
- Stats at Baseball Reference

Teams
- As player: LG Twins (1992–1996; 1998); Hyundai Unicorns (1998–2003); Samsung Lions (2004–2008); LG Twins (2009–2010); As coach: LG Twins (2011–present)

Career highlights and awards
- 3x KBO League Golden Glove Award (1994, 2000, 2004)
Medals
Representing South Korea
Olympic Games
Bronze medal – third place	2000 Sydney	Team

- Park Jong-ho
- Hangul: 박종호
- Hanja: 朴鍾皓
- RR: Bak Jongho
- MR: Pak Chongho

Park Jong-ho (Korean: 박종호; Hanja: 朴鍾皓; born 27 July 1973) is a retired South Korean second baseman who played 17 seasons in the KBO League. He was a switch hitter, and threw right-handed. Park was the first switch hitter to win a batting title in KBO history.

== Professional career ==
Upon graduation from Seongnam High School, Park made his KBO debut in 1992 with the LG Twins. He finished his first KBO season batting .192 with 14 hits and 7 RBIs.

After the mediocre rookie season, Park became a fixture in second base for the Twins in 1993 when he finished with a .263 batting average, 6 home runs and 33 RBIs.

In 1994, Park batted .260, hit 6 home runs, drove in 56 runs and stole a career-high 21 bases, playing in 105 games as a starting second baseman. He helped his team to clinch Korean Series title and won his first KBO League Golden Glove Award at second base.

Prior to the 1998 season, Park was traded to the Hyundai Unicorns.

In 1999, Park hit his first .300 batting average (.301) in his pro career, amassing a career-high 10 home runs and 55 RBIs.

In 2000, Park finished with a .340 average, becoming the first player to win a batting title as a switch hitter. After the season, he won his second Golden Glove award as well. In August, Park was part of the South Korea national baseball team that won the bronze medal at the 2000 Summer Olympics.

In 2004, his first year with the Samsung Lions, Park won his third and final Golden Glove Award at second base.
