= Jin Pil-jung =

South Korean baseball player

Jin Pil-Jung
- Pitcher
- Born: October 13, 1972 (age 53)
- Batted: Right Threw: Right

debut
- 1995, for the OB Bears

Last appearance
- 2006, for the LG Twins

KBO statistics
- Win–loss record: 75–70
- Saves: 191
- Earned run average: 3.20
- Strikeouts: 751
- Stats at Baseball Reference

Teams
- As player: OB / Doosan Bears (1995–2002); Kia Tigers (2003); LG Twins (2004–2006); Woori Heroes · Heroes (2008); As coach: Lotte Giants General 2nd Pitching Coach (2015–present)

Career highlights and awards
- 2× Korean Series champion (1995, 2001); 3x KBO saves leader (2000, 2001, 2002)
Medals
Men's baseball
Representing South Korea
Bronze medal – third place	2000 Sydney	Team

- Jin Pil-jung
- Hangul: 진필중
- Hanja: 陳弼重
- RR: Jin Piljung
- MR: Chin P'ilchung

Jin Pil-jung (Korean: 진필중; Hanja: 陳弼重), (born October 13, 1972) is a former South Korean baseball pitcher. He is currently the General 2nd Pitching Coach for the Lotte Giants.

Jin began his career as a starting pitcher but after three seasons converted to a late-inning reliever.

Jin was part of the South Korean baseball team which won the bronze medal at the 2000 Olympic Games in Sydney, Australia. Pitching for the Doosan Bears, he led the KBO in saves in the years 2000 to 2002.

In December 2002 Jin was unsuccessfully posted to Major League Baseball. The Bears rejected the winning MLB team's highest bid of $25,000. Instead, Jin became a free agent and signed with the Kia Tigers.

== See also ==
- List of KBO career saves leaders
