= Lee Byeong-yong =

South Korean volleyball player (born 1971)

Personal information
- Full name: Lee Byung-Yong
- Nationality: South Korean
- Born: 11 May 1971 (age 54)
- Height: 197 cm (6 ft 6 in)
- Weight: 98 kg (216 lb; 15 st 6 lb)

Sport
- Sport: Volleyball

Lee Byeong-yong (born 11 May 1971) is a South Korean volleyball player. He competed in the men's tournament at the 2000 Summer Olympics.
