= Park Seok-jin =

South Korean baseball player

Samsung Lions – No. 89
- Pitcher / Coach
- Born: July 19, 1972 (age 54)
- Batted: Right Threw: Right

debut
- June 18, 1995, for the Samsung Lions

Last appearance
- May 3, 2008, for the LG Twins

KBO statistics
- Win–loss record: 45–38
- Saves: 28
- Earned run average: 3.83
- Strikeouts: 422
- Stats at Baseball Reference

Teams
- As player: Samsung Lions (1995–1996, 2004–2006); Lotte Giants (1997–2003, 2007); LG Twins (2007–2008); As coach: Tokyo Yakult Swallows (2010–2011); LG Twins (2012–2018); NC Dinos (2019–2024); Samsung Lions (2025–present)

Career highlights and awards
- As player: Korean Series champion (2005); Led KBO in ERA in 2001; As coach: Korean Series champion (2026)
Medals
Representing South Korea
Men's Baseball
Olympic Games
Bronze medal – third place	2000 Sydney	Team

- Park Seok-jin
- Hangul: 박석진
- Hanja: 朴石鎭
- RR: Bak Seokjin
- MR: Pak Sŏkchin

Park Seok-jin (Korean: 박석진; Hanja: 朴石鎮; born July 19, 1972) is a South Korean retired baseball player who played for the Lotte Giants, Samsung Lions and LG Twins of the KBO League. He was noted for his distinct sidearm delivery.

Park was a member of the 2000 South Korea national baseball team that won the bronze medal in the 2000 Summer Olympics.
