= Kim Chel-hwan =

Korean field hockey player (born 1971)

Olympic medal record

Men's field hockey

Representing South Korea
| Silver medal – second place | 2000 Sydney | Team competition |

Kim Chel-Hwan (born 11 May 1971) is a South Korean former field hockey player who competed in the 2000 Summer Olympics.
