= Jung Soo-keun =

South Korean baseball player

Jung Soo-Keun
- Outfielder
- Born: January 20, 1977 (age 49)
- Batted: Light Threw: Light

KBO debut
- April 2, 1995, for the OB Bears

Last KBO appearance
- August 30, 2009, for the Lotte Giants

KBO statistics
- Batting average: .280
- Home runs: 24
- RBI: 450
- Stolen bases: 474
- Stats at Baseball Reference

Teams
- OB Bears / Doosan Bears (1995–2003); Lotte Giants (2004–2009)

Career highlights and awards
- 2x KBO Golden Glove Award winner (1999, 2001); 2x KBO All-Star Game MVP (2004, 2007); 2x Korean Series champion (1995, 2001)
Medals
Men's baseball
Representing South Korea
Bronze medal – third place	2000 Sydney	Team

Jung Soo-Keun (Korean: 정수근; Hanja: 鄭守根; born January 20, 1977, in Seoul, South Korea) is a retired South Korean baseball player who played for the Doosan Bears and Lotte Giants of the Korea Baseball Organization. Jung won four consecutive stolen bases titles (1998-2001) in the KBO league. Over his career he compiled 474 stolen bases, a .280 batting average and 866 runs in 1544 games. His 474 stolen bases rank 4th behind Jeon Jun-Ho, Lee Jong-Beom, and Lee Dae-hyung.

== Professional career ==
In 2000, Jung was part of the South Korea national baseball team which won the bronze medal in the baseball tournament of the 2000 Summer Olympics in Sydney, Australia.

=== Notable international careers ===
Year	Venue	Competition	Team	Individual note
1999	South Korea	Asian Baseball Championship	Gold medal	.235 BA (4-for-17), 1 RBI, 4 R, 4 SB
2000	Australia	Olympic Games	Bronze medal	.273 BA (6-for-22), 3 RBI, 4 R, 6 SB

== Legal troubles ==
In February 2003, Jung was arrested in Honolulu, Hawaii, on charges of battery after slashing two men in a Korean restaurant when he was joining the Doosan Bears spring training camp.

On July 26, 2004, Jung was arrested on assault charges for hitting a man with a baseball bat in Haeundae-gu, Busan. He was arrested again on July 16, 2008, for allegedly punching two security guards and a policeman in Busan.

On August 31, 2009, Jung was involved in an altercation at a Karaoke club in Busan. The police was dispatched to the site after receiving a report that he was half-naked, intoxicated and swearing in a karaoke room, but Jung was not arrested. However, due to the controversy, he was released from the Lotte Giants on September 1, 2009. On September 15, 2009, Jung made an official announcement as to his retirement.

At approximately 4:40 a.m. on June 13, 2010, Jung was involved in a car crash at the intersection in front of Renaissance Seoul Hotel in Seoul where his BMW car crashed into another car. Because his breathalyzer test revealed a blood alcohol level of 0.12 percent, authorities arrested Jung at the scene for misdemeanor drunk driving.
