= Yang Jung-ok =

South Korean basketball player

- Hangul: 양정옥
- RR: Yang Jeongok
- MR: Yang Chŏngok

Yang Jung-ok (born 24 August 1974 in Gwangju) is a Korean former basketball player who competed in the 2000 Summer Olympics.
