= Lim Sun-dong =

South Korean baseball player (born 1973)

- Pitcher
- Born: August 4, 1973 (age 52)
- Batted: Right Threw: Right

debut
- 1997, for the LG Twins

Last appearance
- June 26, 2006, for the Hyundai Unicorns

KBO statistics
- Win–loss record: 52–36
- Earned run average: 4.50
- Strikeouts: 436

Teams
- LG Twins (1997–1998); Hyundai Unicorns (1999–2007)

Career highlights and awards
- KBO League Golden Glove Award (2000); Korean Series champion (2000)
Medals
Men's baseball
Representing South Korea
Bronze medal – third place	2000 Sydney	Team

- Lim Sun-dong
- Hangul: 임선동
- Hanja: 林仙東
- RR: Im Seondong
- MR: Im Sŏndong

Lim Sun-dong (Korean: 임선동; Hanja: 林仙東; born August 4, 1973) is a retired South Korean professional baseball pitcher. He competed in the 1996 Summer Olympics and in the 2000 Summer Olympics, and played 11 seasons in the KBO League. He threw right-handed.

Lim was called "The next Sun Dong-yol" while in college at Yonsei University.

He pitched for the South Korea national baseball team, which won a silver medal at the 1994 Asian Games. (South Korea lost the gold medal game to Japan.)

Upon graduation from college in 1995, Lim was drafted by two teams in two different leagues: the Fukuoka Daiei Hawks of Nippon Professional Baseball (who had been impressed by his work in the previous year's Asian Games), and the LG Twins of the KBO. A court battle prevented him from joining either team, and he eventually ended up playing for a Korean amateur team, the Hyundai Phoenix.

He was a member of the South Korean national baseball team, which finished eighth in the 1996 tournament.

Lim finally signed with the LG Twins in 1997, playing for them for two seasons.

He was traded to the Hyundai Unicorns in 1999. Lim won a league-leading 18 games for Hyundai in 2000, winning the KBO League Golden Glove Award, and playing for the South Korean national baseball team which won the Olympic bronze medal.

He 14 victories for the Unicorns in 2001, but his career went downhill afterward, and he spent the bulk of the rest of his remaining seasons going back and forth between the Unicorns' Futures League club and the KBO team. When he retired in 2007 he had not won a game in the KBO since 2002.
