= Maels Rodríguez =

Cuban baseball player

- Pitcher
- Born: 15 October 1979 (age 46); Báez, Villa Clara Province, Cuba
- Bats: Right Throws: Right
Medals
Men's baseball
Representing Cuba
Olympic Games
Silver medal – second place	2000 Sydney	Team
Baseball World Cup
Gold medal – first place	2001 Taipei	Team
Gold medal – first place	2003 Havana	Team
Intercontinental Cup
Gold medal – first place	2002 Havana	Team
Pan American Games
Gold medal – first place	1999 Winnipeg	Team

Maels Rodríguez Corrales (born 15 October 1979) is a Cuban baseball player and Olympic silver medalist. He set the Cuban National Series record for strikeouts in one season after he struck out 263 players in just 178.1 innings of play during the 2000–2001 Cuban National Series season. In that season he won 15 games while also leading in walks granted with 76. He led the Gallos de Sancti Spiritus to the playoffs that year and was eventually awarded the Cuban National Series Most Valuable Player Award, the second player from that team to ever win the award.

In six seasons of play in Cuba he went 65-45, having 1,148 strikeouts in 938 innings of work while having a 2.29 ERA. He allowed a batting average of .177. He attempted to defect from Cuba to play in Major League Baseball, but a subsequent arm injury derailed his chances. He was the second pitcher in Cuban player history to throw 100 mph or more and his mark of 100.5 mph; Aroldis Chapman is the only pitcher with a higher mark, having thrown 101.2 miles per hour.
