= José Ibar =

Cuban baseball player

Medal record

Men's baseball

Representing Cuba

Olympic Games
Silver medal – second place	2000 Sydney	Team

Baseball World Cup
Gold medal – first place	1998 Rome	Team
Gold medal – first place	2001 Taipei	Team

Intercontinental Cup
Gold medal – first place	1995 Havana	Team
Gold medal – first place	2002 Havana	Team

Pan American Games
Gold medal – first place	1995 Mar del Plata	Team
Gold medal – first place	1999 Winnipeg	Team

José Ibar Medina (born May 4, 1969) is a Cuban baseball player and Olympic silver medalist.
