= Lim Chang-yong =

Korean baseball player (born 1976)

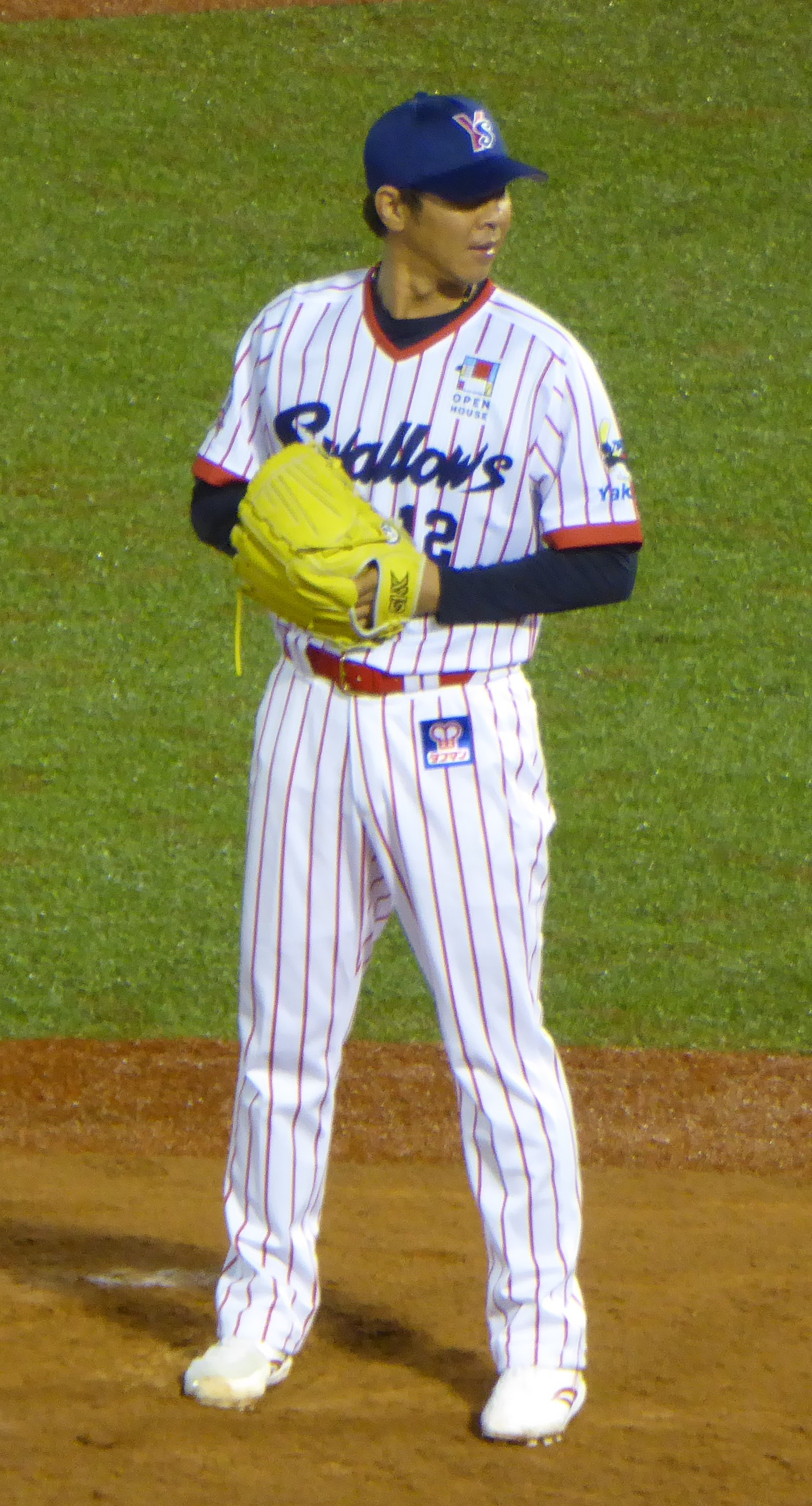
- Pitcher
- Born: June 30, 1976 (age 50); Gwangju, South Korea
- Batted: Right Threw: Right

Professional debut
- KBO: June 18, 1995, for the Haitai Tigers
- NPB: March 28, 2008, for the Tokyo Yakult Swallows
- MLB: September 7, 2013, for the Chicago Cubs

Last appearance
- KBO: October 16, 2018, for the Kia Tigers
- NPB: June 22, 2012, for the Tokyo Yakult Swallows
- MLB: September 27, 2013, for the Chicago Cubs

KBO statistics
- Win–loss record: 130–86
- Earned run average: 3.45
- Strikeouts: 1,474
- Saves: 258

NPB statistics
- Win–loss record: 11–13
- Earned run average: 2.09
- Strikeouts: 231
- Saves: 128

MLB statistics
- Win–loss record: 0–0
- Earned run average: 5.40
- Strikeouts: 5
- Saves: 0
- Stats at Baseball Reference

Teams
- Haitai Tigers (1995–1998); Samsung Lions (1999–2007); Tokyo Yakult Swallows (2008–2012); Chicago Cubs (2013); Samsung Lions (2014–2015); Kia Tigers (2016–2018)

Career highlights and awards
- 2× Korean Series champion (2014, 2017); KBO ERA leader (1999); 4× KBO saves leader (1998–1999, 2004, 2015)
Medals
Men's baseball
Representing South Korea
Olympic Games
Bronze medal – third place	2000 Sydney	Team
World Baseball Classic
Silver medal – second place	2009 Los Angeles	Team
Asian Games
Gold medal – first place	2014 Incheon	Team
Gold medal – first place	2002 Busan	Team
Gold medal – first place	1998 Bangkok	Team

- Lim Chang-yong
- Hangul: 임창용
- Hanja: 林昌勇
- RR: Im Changyong
- MR: Im Ch'angyong

Lim Chang-yong (Korean: 임창용; Korean pronunciation: [im.tɕʰaŋ.joŋ]; born June 30, 1976) is a former South Korean professional baseball right-handed pitcher. He pitched in Major League Baseball, Nippon Professional Baseball, and KBO League baseball. In the KBO, Lim ranks among the top ten pitchers in terms of career wins, strikeouts, and saves.

== Career ==
Lim is a 5 ft 11 in, 175 lb right-handed sidearm pitcher. He could throw a 160 kilometres per hour (99 mph) four-seam fastball, though the pitch usually sat at 93–95 mph (150–153 km/h). His signature pitch was his two-seam fastball which, due to its unique tailing movement earned the nickname "Serpent fastball" (뱀직구). His other pitches included a high 70s slider with a sharp horizontal break, a mid 80s forkball, and a rarely used 60 mph (97 km/h) slow-curveball. He was one of the few pitchers who could pitch in multiple pitching forms. Lim pitched primarily sidearm and underhand, but could pitch from the three-quarters motion at will.

=== KBO (1995–2007) ===
==== Haitai Tigers ====
Lim made his pro debut in 1995 with the Haitai Tigers in Korea Baseball Organization, and was regularly picked for the South Korean baseball team as a relief pitcher since the 1998 Asian Games, and won the bronze medal at the 2000 Summer Olympics and two Asian Game gold medals in 1998 and 2002.

==== Samsung Lions ====
Though predominantly known as a closer, Lim was converted to a starting pitcher in 2001, and spent three years as the Samsung Lions' starter before returning to the bullpen in 2004. There was interest from Major League squads, but Lim decided to stay in South Korea.

=== NPB (2008–2012) ===
==== Tokyo Yakult Swallows ====
In late 2007, Lim was signed by Japan's Tokyo Yakult Swallows in the hopes of bolstering their weak bullpen. In the 2008 NPB season, he recorded 33 saves (5th in the NPB league) with a 3.00 ERA in 51 innings pitched.

In the 2009 NPB season, he recorded a 0.00 ERA for a few months, earning his nickname "Mr.Zero", and was also featured in the 2009 NPB All-star Game as a closer for the Central League team. He was sent down to the reserve squad after his ERA rose to 1.84 in a short stint, but he was brought back to strengthen Yakult's weak bullpen, which was responsible for its recent losses.

Lim had his second Tommy John surgery in July 2012.

=== MLB (2013) ===
==== Chicago Cubs ====
After the 2012 season, Lim agreed to a contract with the Chicago Cubs of Major League Baseball. The Cubs promoted Lim to the major leagues on September 4, 2013. After the season, Lim was non-tendered by Chicago, becoming a free agent. The Cubs re-signed him to a minor league contract. He was released on March 24, 2014.

=== KBO (2014–2018) ===
==== Second stint with Lions ====
After being released by the Cubs, Lim signed up with Samsung Lions of KBO League (South Korea). In 2014 season, he recorded 31 saves with 5.84 ERA. However, in 2015 season he showed better performance of 33 saves, 2.83 ERA.

Lim was released after 2015 season for illegal gambling.

==== Second stint with Tigers ====
Lim played with the Tigers for the second time in 2016–2018. On March 11, 2019, he announced his retirement.

== See also ==
- List of KBO career win leaders
- List of KBO career strikeout leaders
- List of KBO career saves leaders
