= Song Jin-woo (baseball) =

South Korean baseball player (born 1966)

Hanwha Eagles – No. 21
- Pitcher / Coach
- Born: February 16, 1966 (age 60); Jeungpyeong, North Chungcheong, South Korea
- Batted: Left Threw: Left

KBO debut
- April 12, 1989, for the Binggrae Eagles

Last KBO appearance
- September 23, 2009, for the Hanwha Eagles

KBO statistics
- Win–loss: 210–153
- Earned run average: 3.51
- Saves: 103
- Strikeouts: 2,048
- Stats at Baseball Reference

Teams
- As player: Binggrae Eagles / Hanwha Eagles (1989–2009); As coach: Hanwha Eagles (2011–2014); Hanwha Eagles (2018–present)

Career highlights and awards
- Golden Glove Award winner (2000); Korean Series champion (1999); Pitched no-hitter on May 18, 2000; Hanwha Eagles #21 retired; KBO Records: 210 career wins; 3003 career innings pitched
Medals
Representing South Korea
Olympic Games
| Bronze medal – third place | 2000 Sydney | Team |
Asian Games
| Gold medal – first place | 2002 Busan | Team |

- Song Jin-woo
- Hangul: 송진우
- Hanja: 宋津宇
- RR: Song Jinu
- MR: Song Chinu

Song Jin-woo (Korean: 송진우; Hanja: 宋津宇; born February 16, 1966) is a South Korean retired left-handed pitcher. Song played in the KBO League for 21 seasons between 1989 and 2009 with the Hanwha Eagles. He currently holds several pitching records for the KBO, including his 210 wins and 3,003 innings pitched. He is one of two pitchers in KBO League history to win 200 games, and strike out 2,000 or more batters. Because of his central role in establishing the Korean baseball players' association (essentially a players' union), he has the nickname of "Mr. President."

== Playing career ==
Song attended Dongguk University. He competed for South Korea in the 1988 Summer Olympics, and at the 2000 Summer Olympics, on the team that won the bronze medal.

On May 18, 2000, Song no-hit the Haitai Tigers (winning the game 6–0), becoming only the tenth KBO pitcher to accomplish that feat.

Song won the 2002 KBO League Golden Glove Award with a record of 18–7, a 2.99 ERA, 165 strikeouts, and 8 complete games.

Song was the first pitcher in the KBO to strike out over 2,000 batters. He accomplished this feat on June 6, 2008, at his home field of Daejeon Baseball Stadium against the Woori Heroes. He recorded the strikeout in the bottom of the 8th inning with two outs, ringing up Song Ji-man.

Song's number 21 jersey was retired by the Eagles on September 23, 2009.

Song's record of 2,048 strikeouts lasted 15 years until it was broken by Yang Hyeon-jong of the Kia Tigers on August 21, 2024.

== Coaching career ==
Song became the Eagles' pitching coach in 2018, vowing to change the team's approach. Song said, "Changing the entry is the most sensitive issue between coaches and players." Song's "personalized' prescription" played a big role. Foreign pitcher Keyvius Sampson had difficulty in the early stages of the season, but he improved his position as well as his arrest while correcting his position. [Song] told Jason Wheeler to fix the changeup. Song coach also emphasized "communication."

== Filmography ==
=== Television show ===
| Year | Title | Network | Role | Ref. |
|---|---|---|---|---|
| 2022 | Back to the Ground | MBN | Coach | |

== See also ==
- List of KBO career win leaders
- List of KBO career saves leaders
- List of KBO career strikeout leaders
