= Kim Soo-kyung (baseball) =

South Korean baseball player

Kim Soo-Kyung

Nexen Heroes – No. 83
- Starting pitcher / Coach
- Born: August 20, 1979 (age 46)
- Batted: Right Threw: Right

KBO debut
- April 17, 1998, for the Hyundai Unicorns

Last KBO appearance
- 2012, for the Nexen Heroes

KBO statistics
- Win–loss record: 112–98
- Earned run average: 4.29
- Strikeouts: 1,370
- Stats at Baseball Reference

Teams
- As player: Hyundai Unicorns (1998–2007); Woori / Nexen Heroes (2008–2012); As coach: Nexen Heroes (2013–present)

Career highlights and awards
- 4× Korean Series champion (1998, 2000, 2003, 2004); 1998 KBO Rookie of the Year
Medals
Representing South Korea
Men's baseball
Olympics
Bronze medal – third place	2000 Sydney	Team

- Kim Soo-kyung
- Hangul: 김수경
- RR: Gim Sugyeong
- MR: Kim Sugyŏng

Kim Soo-Kyung (Korean: 김수경; born August 20, 1979) is a South Korean pitcher who played for the Nexen Heroes in the KBO League.

He is a right-handed pitcher and was part of the South Korean baseball team which won the bronze medal and was strike-out championship in 1999. He was present at the Hyundai Unicorns's win at 2000, achieving 18 wins.
