= Kim Tae-gyun (baseball, born 1971) =

South Korean baseball player

Lotte Giants – No. 70
- Infielder / Coach
- Born: August 19, 1971 (age 54); Busan
- Batted: Right Threw: Right

KBO debut
- 1994, for the Samsung Lions

Last appearance
- 2007, for the SK Wyverns

KBO statistics
- Batting average: .227
- Hits: 673
- Home runs: 63
- Runs batted in: 335

Teams
- As player: Samsung Lions (1994–2002); Lotte Giants (2002–2004); SK Wyverns (2005–2007); As coach: SK Wyverns (2007–2011); Samsung Lions (2012–2015); Lotte Giants (2016–present)
Medals
Men's baseball
Representing South Korea
Olympic Games
Bronze medal – third place	2000 Sydney	Team

- Kim Tae-gyun
- Hangul: 김태균
- Hanja: 金泰均
- RR: Gim Taegyun
- MR: Kim T'aegyun

Kim Tae-gyun (Korean: 김태균; born August 19, 1971) is a former South Korean baseball player.

Not known for his batting, Kim was an excellent utility infielder and was a key component to the defensive formula of the Samsung Lions in the late-1990s. He was part of the South Korean national baseball team which won the bronze medal at the 2000 Summer Olympics. In the middle of the 2002 season, Kim was traded to the Lotte Giants. After a career year in 2004 Kim was signed as a free agent by the SK Wyverns and played there until 2007 when he announced retirement.

Kim served as the infield instructor of the SK Wyverns reserve team.
