= Baseball at the 2000 Summer Olympics =

Baseball at the Games of the XXVII Olympiad
- Venues: Sydney Baseball Stadium; Blacktown Olympic Park
- Dates: 17–27 September 2000
- Teams: 8

Medalists
1st place, gold medalist(s)		United States
2nd place, silver medalist(s)		Cuba
3rd place, bronze medalist(s)		South Korea

Baseball at the 2000 Summer Olympics was the third time an Olympic baseball tournament had been held as a full medal sport, and the ninth time it had been part of the Summer Olympic Games in any capacity. It was held in Sydney, Australia from 17 September through to the bronze and gold medal games on 27 September. Two venues were used for the Games: the Sydney Baseball Stadium and Blacktown Olympic Park. For the first time in Olympic competition, professional baseball players were eligible to participate, though no active players from Major League Baseball were available.

In the gold medal game known as the "Miracle on Grass", the United States became Olympic Champions for the first time in its baseball history by defeating Cuba 4–0. Since becoming a medal sport, it was the first time Cuba had not won the gold medal. The gold medal game was also only the second game Cuba had lost in Olympic baseball, having lost to the Netherlands earlier in the tournament. South Korea won their first Olympic baseball medal, beating Japan in the bronze medal match 3–1.

== Format ==
The main tournament featured eight teams. These teams were selected from a series of continental qualifying tournaments, with the exception of Australia who qualified automatically as hosts. As had been the case at the 1996 Games in Atlanta, two teams each qualified from the Americas via the 1999 Pan American Games, Asia via the 1999 Asian Baseball Championship, and Europe via the 1999 European Baseball Championship. The final spot went to the winner of a deciding series between the African and Oceania champions, as determined by the 1999 All-Africa Games and the 1999 Oceania Baseball Championship respectively. This playoff was won by South Africa, who swept Guam in a best-of-five series in Johannesburg in December 1999.

The eight teams met in a round-robin series, facing each other once. The top four teams from this then met in the finals, with the first and fourth placed teams playing against each other in one semi final, and the second and third placed teams in the other. The losers of these semi finals competed in the bronze medal game, while the winners met in the gold medal game.

== Teams ==
Team	Qualification method
Australia	Host nation
Cuba	1999 Pan American Games
Italy	1999 European Baseball Championship
Japan	1999 Asian Baseball Championship
Netherlands	1999 European Baseball Championship
South Africa	1999 All-Africa Games, then defeated Guam in Africa Champion v Oceania Champion playoff
South Korea	1999 Asian Baseball Championship
United States	1999 Pan American Games

== Results ==
=== Preliminary round ===
Pos	Team	Pld	W	L	RF	RA	RD	PCT	GB	Qualification
1	Cuba	7	6	1	50	17	+33	.857 (Note: Cuba defeated the United States 6–1.)	—	Advance to knockout round
2	United States	7	6	1	42	14	+28	.857	—	Advance to knockout round
3	South Korea	7	4	3	40	26	+14	.571 (Note: South Korea defeated Japan 7–6.)	2	Advance to knockout round
4	Japan	7	4	3	41	23	+18	.571	2	Advance to knockout round
5	Netherlands	7	3	4	19	29	−10	.429	3	
6	Italy	7	2	5	33	43	−10	.286 (Note: Italy defeated Australia 8–7.)	4	
7	Australia (H)	7	2	5	30	41	−11	.286	4	
8	South Africa	7	1	6	11	73	−62	.143	5	

(H) Hosts
Notes:

17 September	Cuba	16–0 (F/7)	South Africa	Blacktown Olympic Park; Attendance: 3,082
17 September		Boxscore		Blacktown Olympic Park; Attendance: 3,082

17 September	United States	4–2 (F/13)	Japan	Sydney Baseball Stadium; Attendance: 13,404
17 September		Boxscore		Sydney Baseball Stadium; Attendance: 13,404

17 September	Italy	2–10	South Korea	Blacktown Olympic Park; Attendance: 2,951
17 September		Boxscore		Blacktown Olympic Park; Attendance: 2,951

17 September	Australia	4–6	Netherlands	Sydney Baseball Stadium; Attendance: 13,762
17 September		Boxscore		Sydney Baseball Stadium; Attendance: 13,762

18 September	Cuba	13–5	Italy	Blacktown Olympic Park; Attendance: 2,424
18 September		Boxscore		Blacktown Olympic Park; Attendance: 2,424

18 September	South Korea	3–5	Australia	Sydney Baseball Stadium; Attendance: 13,281
18 September		Boxscore		Sydney Baseball Stadium; Attendance: 13,281

18 September	United States	11–1 (F/7)	South Africa	Blacktown Olympic Park; Attendance: 3,474
18 September		Boxscore		Blacktown Olympic Park; Attendance: 3,474

18 September	Japan	10–2	Netherlands	Sydney Baseball Stadium; Attendance: 11,360
18 September		Boxscore		Sydney Baseball Stadium; Attendance: 11,360

19 September	South Africa	0–13 (F/7)	Italy	Blacktown Olympic Park; Attendance: 2,511
19 September		Boxscore		Blacktown Olympic Park; Attendance: 2,511

19 September	Australia	3–7	Japan	Sydney Baseball Stadium; Attendance: 13,093
19 September		Boxscore		Sydney Baseball Stadium; Attendance: 13,093

19 September	Netherlands	2–6	United States	Blacktown Olympic Park; Attendance: 3,352
19 September		Boxscore		Blacktown Olympic Park; Attendance: 3,352

19 September	South Korea	5–6	Cuba	Sydney Baseball Stadium; Attendance: 13,565
19 September		Boxscore		Sydney Baseball Stadium; Attendance: 13,565

20 September	Italy	1–6	Japan	Blacktown Olympic Park; Attendance: 3,245
20 September		Boxscore		Blacktown Olympic Park; Attendance: 3,245

20 September	Netherlands	4–2	Cuba	Sydney Baseball Stadium; Attendance: 12,450
20 September		Boxscore		Sydney Baseball Stadium; Attendance: 12,450

20 September	South Africa	4–10	Australia	Blacktown Olympic Park; Attendance: 3,459
20 September		Boxscore		Blacktown Olympic Park; Attendance: 3,459

20 September	United States	4–0	South Korea	Sydney Baseball Stadium; Attendance: 13,818
20 September		Boxscore		Sydney Baseball Stadium; Attendance: 13,818

22 September	South Korea	2–0	Netherlands	Blacktown Olympic Park; Attendance: 3,350
22 September		Boxscore		Blacktown Olympic Park; Attendance: 3,350

22 September	Cuba	1–0	Australia	Sydney Baseball Stadium; Attendance: 14,036
22 September		Boxscore		Sydney Baseball Stadium; Attendance: 14,036

22 September	South Africa	0–8	Japan	Blacktown Olympic Park; Attendance: 3,512
22 September		Boxscore		Blacktown Olympic Park; Attendance: 3,512

22 September	United States	4–2	Italy	Sydney Baseball Stadium; Attendance: 13,912
22 September		Boxscore		Sydney Baseball Stadium; Attendance: 13,912

23 September	Netherlands	2–3 (F/10)	South Africa	Blacktown Olympic Park; Attendance: 3,484
23 September		Boxscore		Blacktown Olympic Park; Attendance: 3,484

23 September	Japan	6–7 (F/10)	South Korea	Sydney Baseball Stadium; Attendance: 13,970
23 September		Boxscore		Sydney Baseball Stadium; Attendance: 13,970

23 September	Australia	7–8 (F/12)	Italy	Blacktown Olympic Park; Attendance: 3,562
23 September		Boxscore		Blacktown Olympic Park; Attendance: 3,562

23 September	Cuba	6–1	United States	Sydney Baseball Stadium; Attendance: 14,010
23 September		Boxscore		Sydney Baseball Stadium; Attendance: 14,010

24 September	Italy	2–3	Netherlands	Blacktown Olympic Park; Attendance: 3,439
24 September		Boxscore		Blacktown Olympic Park; Attendance: 3,439

24 September	South Korea	13–3 (F/8)	South Africa	Sydney Baseball Stadium; Attendance: 13,864
24 September		Boxscore		Sydney Baseball Stadium; Attendance: 13,864

24 September	Japan	2–6	Cuba	Blacktown Olympic Park; Attendance: 3,479
24 September		Boxscore		Blacktown Olympic Park; Attendance: 3,479

24 September	Australia	1–12 (F/7)	United States	Sydney Baseball Stadium; Attendance: 14,018
24 September		Boxscore		Sydney Baseball Stadium; Attendance: 14,018

=== Final round ===
Semi-finals

Gold medal match

1
Cuba
3

4
Japan
0

W1
Cuba
0

W2
United States
4

3
United States
3

2
South Korea
2

Bronze medal match

L2
South Korea
3

L1
Japan
1

==== Semi-finals ====
26 September	Cuba	3–0	Japan	Sydney Baseball Stadium; Attendance: 13,727

26 September	United States	3–2	South Korea	Sydney Baseball Stadium; Attendance: 14,002

==== Bronze medal game ====
27 September	South Korea	3 – 1	Japan	Sydney Baseball Stadium; Attendance: 14,058

==== Gold medal game ====
27 September	Cuba	0 – 4	United States	Sydney Baseball Stadium; Attendance: 14,107

== Final standings ==
Rk	Team	W	L
1	United States	8	1
Lost in the gold medal game
2	Cuba	7	2
Failed to qualify for gold medal game
3	South Korea	6	3
4	Japan	5	4
Failed to qualify for semi-finals
5	Netherlands	3	4
6	Italy	2	5
7	Australia	2	5
8	South Africa	1	6

Gold	Silver	Bronze
United States Brent Abernathy; Kurt Ainsworth; Pat Borders; Sean Burroughs; John Cotton; Travis Dawkins; Adam Everett; Ryan Franklin; Chris George; Shane Heams; Marcus Jensen; Mike Kinkade; Rick Krivda; Doug Mientkiewicz; Mike Neill; Roy Oswalt; Jon Rauch; Anthony Sanders; Bobby Seay; Ben Sheets; Brad Wilkerson; Todd Williams; Ernie Young; Tim Young	Cuba Omar Ajete; Yovany Aragon; Miguel Caldés; Danel Castro; José Contreras; Yobal Dueñas; Yasser Gómez; José Ibar; Orestes Kindelán; Pedro Luis Lazo; Omar Linares; Oscar Macías; Juan Manrique; Javier Méndez; Rolando Meriño; Germán Mesa; Antonio Pacheco Massó; Ariel Pestano; Gabriel Pierre; Maels Rodríguez; Antonio Scull; Luis Ulacia; Lázaro Valle; Norge Luis Vera	South Korea Jang Sung-Ho; Chong Tae-Hyon; Chung Min-Tae; Jung Soo-Keun; Hong Sung-Heon; Jin Pil-jung; Kim Dong-Joo; Kim Han-Soo; Kim Ki-Tae; Kim Soo-Kyung; Kim Tae-gyun; Koo Dae-Sung; Lee Byung-Kyu; Lee Seung-Ho; Lee Seung-Yeop; Lim Chang-Yong; Lim Sun-Dong; Park Jae-Hong; Park Jin-Man; Park Jong-Ho; Park Kyung-Oan; Park Seok-Jin; Son Min-Han; Song Jin-Woo

2000 Olympic champions

United States
1st title
