= Baseball at the Summer Olympics =

- IOC Code: BSB (baseball/softball); BBL (baseball only)
- Governing body: WBSC
- Events: 1 (men)

Summer Olympics
- 1896; 1900; 1904; 1908; 1912; 1920; 1924; 1928; 1932; 1936; 1948; 1952; 1956; 1960; 1964; 1968; 1972; 1976; 1980; 1984; 1988; 1992; 1996; 2000; 2004; 2008; 2012; 2016; 2020; 2024; 2028; 2032; Note: demonstration or exhibition sport years indicated in italics
- Medalists

Baseball at the Summer Olympics unofficially debuted at the 1900 Summer Olympics in Paris, and was first contested as a demonstration sport at the 1912 Summer Olympics in Stockholm. It became an official Olympic sport at the 1992 Summer Olympics in Barcelona, then was played at each Olympiad through the 2008 Summer Olympics in Beijing. The sport was then dropped from the Summer Olympic program, until being revived for the 2020 Summer Olympics in Tokyo for a single appearance. It is next expected to be part of the 2028 Summer Olympics in Los Angeles.

Olympic baseball is governed by the World Baseball Softball Confederation (WBSC).

== History ==
Although little was recorded, Olympic baseball first appeared at the 1900 Paris Games. Twelve years later, in 1912, in Stockholm, a United States team played against host Sweden, winning 13–3. An exhibition baseball game was also played at the 1924 Summer Olympics in Paris. In 1936, in Berlin, two United States teams played each other before approximately 90,000–100,000 spectators at the Reichsportsfeld. The 1952 Helsinki event was a modified form of the sport, Finnish baseball, played by two Finnish teams. Australia played a one-game exhibition against the United States in 1956 Melbourne and Japan did the same in 1964 in Tokyo. With a crowd of nearly 114,000 spectators, this game at the Melbourne Cricket Ground held the record for the highest attended exhibition baseball game ever until a 2008 American game in Los Angeles.

Leslie Mann, a former MLB player and coach of the United States national team, was an early advocate of bringing baseball to the Olympics. However, baseball's inclusion in the Olympics was opposed by powerful figures like Avery Brundage, longtime head of the United States Olympic Committee who was elevated to president of the International Olympic Committee (IOC) in 1952. Brundage was opposed to the "commercialization" of the Olympics, and believed that baseball, as a professional sport, was incompatible with the amateur ethos of the Olympics. Brundage was quoted as saying, "I suspect that if a professional baseball player discovered one day that he could make more money by going back home and laying bricks for a living, he'd go back home and lay bricks."

After a twenty-year hiatus, Olympic baseball (labelled an exhibition sport/event by the IOC) returned but with tournament formatting (1984 Los Angeles). At the 1988 Seoul games, it was termed a demonstration sport. Japan defeated the United States in the inaugural tournament finale in 1984. In 1988, the United States won over Japan.

Baseball was open only to male amateurs in 1992 and 1996. As a result, the Americans and other nations where professional baseball is developed relied on collegiate players, while Cubans used their most experienced veterans, who technically were considered amateurs as they nominally held other jobs, but in fact trained full-time. In 2000, pros were admitted, but Major League Baseball refused to release its players in 2000, 2004, and 2008, and the situation changed only a little: the Cubans still used their best players, while the Americans started using minor leaguers. The IOC cited the absence of the best players as the main reason for baseball being dropped from the Olympic program.

In contrast, Nippon Professional Baseball has allowed its players to compete in the Olympics, and paused its 2021 season for the duration of the 2020 Tokyo Olympics (held in 2021).

At the IOC meeting on July 7, 2005, baseball and softball were voted out of the 2012 Summer Olympics in London, United Kingdom, becoming the first sports voted out of the Olympics since polo was eliminated from the 1936 Olympics. The elimination excised 16 teams and more than 300 athletes from the 2012 Olympics. The two slots left available by the IOC's elimination were subsequently filled by golf and rugby sevens in 2016. This decision was reaffirmed on February 9, 2006.

In the stands during the 2008 bronze medal game between the U.S. and Japan, IOC head Jacques Rogge was interviewed by MLB.com's Mark Newman and cited various criteria for baseball to earn its way back in:

To be on the Olympic program is an issue where you need universality as much as possible. You need to have a sport with a following, you need to have the best players and you need to be in strict compliance with WADA (World Anti-Doping Agency). And these are the qualifications that have to be met. When you have all that, you have to win hearts. You can win the mind, but you still must win hearts.

It was officially decided in August 2009 at the IOC Board meeting in Berlin that baseball would also not be included in the 2016 Summer Olympics.

On April 1, 2011, the IBAF and the International Softball Federation announced they were preparing a joint proposal to revive play of both sports at the 2020 Summer Olympics.

On September 8, 2013, the International Olympic Committee voted to reinstate wrestling, defeating the combined baseball-softball bid for the 2020 Summer Olympics.

Under new IOC policies that shift the Games to an "event-based" program rather than sport-based, the host organizing committee can now also propose the addition of sports to the program alongside the permanent "core" events. A second bid for baseball-softball to be included as an event in 2020 was shortlisted by the Tokyo Organizing Committee on June 22, 2015. On August 3, 2016, during the 129th IOC Session in Rio de Janeiro, Brazil, the IOC approved the Tokyo Organizing Committee's final shortlist of five sports, which included baseball, to be included in the program during the 2020 Summer Olympics. Baseball was not included in the 2024 Paris Olympics, but it is expected that it will be included along with softball, in the 2028 Los Angeles Olympics due to baseball's popularity in the United States.

Softball Australia, Baseball Australia and the World Baseball Softball Confederation announced their intent to pursue baseball/softball for the Brisbane 2032 programs.

== Results ==
#	Year	Official host	Final			Bronze medal match			Teams
#	Year	Official host	Gold medal	Score and venue	Runners-up	Third place	Score and venue	Fourth place	Teams
1	1992	Spain	Cuba	11–1; Estadi Municipal de Futbol de L'Hospitalet, Catalonia	Chinese Taipei	Japan	8–3; Estadi Municipal de Futbol de L'Hospitalet, Catalonia	United States	8
2	1996	United States	Cuba	13–9; Atlanta–Fulton County Stadium, Atlanta	Japan	United States	10–3; Atlanta–Fulton County Stadium, Atlanta	Nicaragua	8
3	2000	Australia	United States	4–0; Sydney Showground Stadium, Sydney	Cuba	South Korea	3–1; Sydney Showground Stadium, Sydney	Japan	8
4	2004	Greece	Cuba	6–2; Hellinikon Olympic Complex, Athens	Australia	Japan	11–2; Hellinikon Olympic Complex, Athens	Canada	8
5	2008	China	South Korea	3–2; Wukesong Arena, Beijing	Cuba	United States	8–4; Wukesong Arena, Beijing	Japan	8
6	2020	Japan	Japan	2–0; Yokohama Stadium, Yokohama	United States	Dominican Republic	10–6; Yokohama Stadium, Yokohama	South Korea	6
7	2028	United States							6

== Medal table ==
Rank	Nation	Gold	Silver	Bronze	Total
1	Cuba	3	2	0	5
2	Japan	1	1	2	4
2	United States	1	1	2	4
4	South Korea	1	0	1	2
5	Australia	0	1	0	1
5	Chinese Taipei	0	1	0	1
7	Dominican Republic	0	0	1	1
Totals (7 entries)		6	6	6	18

== Qualification ==
The host nation was always guaranteed a place in the Olympic baseball tournament. The other seven places were generally determined by continental qualifying tournaments. For the 2008 Games, the Americas received two places, Europe received one place, and Asia received one place.

The final three places were given to the top three nations at an eight-team tournament held after the continental tournaments. Qualification for this tournament was determined by those continental tournaments. The third and fourth place American teams, second and third place European teams, second and third place Asian teams, first place African team, and first place Oceania team competed in that tournament.

This qualification tournament was new for 2008. It was created after heavy criticism of the previous qualification standard. In previous Olympics, only two teams from the Americas were able to qualify for the Olympics, despite the fact that the vast majority of the top baseball-playing nations in the world came from this region. Europe, whose baseball nations were substantially weaker, also entered two teams.

== Competition ==
Olympic baseball was nearly identical to most professional baseball. Aluminum bats were disallowed after 1996 Atlanta. There was also a mercy rule that was invoked if a team was winning by 10 or more runs after 7 innings (or 6.5 innings if the home team was leading). For Sydney 2000, rosters were expanded to 24 players.

The tournament consisted of a round-robin preliminary round in which each team played all 7 of the other teams. Only the top four teams advanced to the medals round. In that round, semifinals were played between the 1st/4th place teams and the 2nd/3rd place teams. The semifinal losers then played a bronze medal game, with the winner earning the medal and the loser receiving 4th place. The semifinal winners played in the final, which awarded the winner a gold medal and the loser a silver medal.

During the 2008 games, a unique rule went into effect during games which went into extra innings. If the game was still tied after the completion of the tenth inning base runners were automatically placed on first and second base with no outs. IBAF created this rule to encourage scoring late in the game in order to determine a winner and to address criticisms from the IOC that a baseball game's length was unpredictable.

== Participating nations ==
The following 19 nations have taken part in the baseball competition. The numbers in the table refer to the final rank of each team in each tournament.

Nation	92	96	00	04	08	20	28	Years
Australia		7	6	2				3
Canada				4	6			2
China					8			1
Chinese Taipei	2			5	5			3
Cuba	1	1	2	1	2			5
Dominican Republic	6					3	Q	3
Greece				7				1
Israel						5		1
Italy	7	6	7	8				4
Japan	3	2	4	3	4	1		6
Mexico						6		1
Netherlands		5	5	6	7			4
Nicaragua		4						1
Puerto Rico	5							1
South Africa			8					1
South Korea		8	3		1	4		4
Spain	8							1
United States	4	3	1		3	2	Q	6
Venezuela							Q	1
Total (19)	8	8	8	8	8	6	6	_

== See also ==
- Olympic Baseball
- List of Olympic medalists in baseball
- List of Olympic venues in discontinued events
- Softball at the Summer Olympics

== Sources ==
- Official Olympic Reports (digitized copies online)
- International Olympic Committee results database
