= Pat Borders =

American baseball player & coach (born 1963)

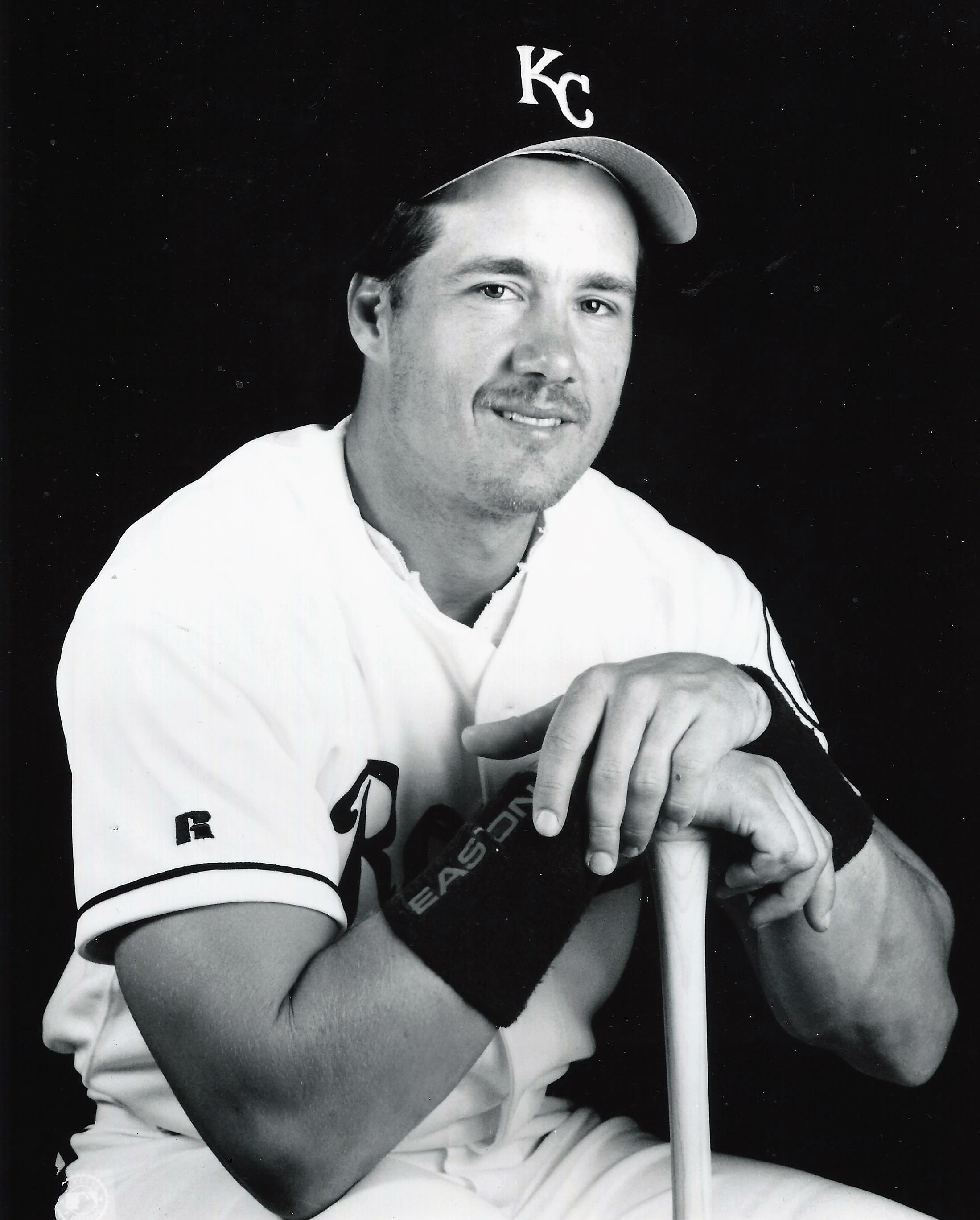
- Borders with the Kansas City Royals in 1995
- Catcher
- Born: May 14, 1963 (age 63); Columbus, Ohio, U.S.
- Batted: Right Threw: Right

MLB debut
- April 6, 1988, for the Toronto Blue Jays

Last MLB appearance
- July 27, 2005, for the Seattle Mariners

MLB statistics
- Batting average: .253
- Home runs: 69
- Runs batted in: 346
- Stats at Baseball Reference

Teams
- Toronto Blue Jays (1988–1994); Kansas City Royals (1995); Houston Astros (1995); St. Louis Cardinals (1996); California Angels (1996); Chicago White Sox (1996); Cleveland Indians (1997–1999); Toronto Blue Jays (1999); Seattle Mariners (2001–2004); Minnesota Twins (2004); Seattle Mariners (2005)

Career highlights and awards
- 2× World Series champion (1992, 1993); World Series MVP (1992)
Medals
Men's baseball
Representing United States
Olympic Games
Gold medal – first place	2000 Sydney	Team

Patrick Lance Borders (born May 14, 1963) is an American former professional baseball player and current coach. He played as a catcher in Major League Baseball from 1988 to 2005. He was the Most Valuable Player of the 1992 World Series as a member of the Toronto Blue Jays. Borders also won an Olympic gold medal with the United States baseball team at the 2000 Summer Olympics in Sydney.

Borders was the manager of the Williamsport Crosscutters of the New York–Penn League from 2015 to 2021. He is currently an assistant coach at Webber International University.

== Early years ==
Borders was born in Columbus, Ohio but spent the majority of his childhood in Lake Wales, Florida, where he currently resides. He attended Lake Wales High School and was a standout in both football and baseball. He batted .440 as a junior, and as a senior he batted .510 with a school single season record 10 home runs and 36 RBI. Although he was offered a football/baseball scholarship to Mississippi State University, he turned it down to sign with the Blue Jays, who had drafted him in the sixth round of the 1982 Major League Baseball draft.

== Professional career ==
Borders was brought up in the Toronto Blue Jays system. Initially a third baseman, he was moved to first base and played some in the outfield before converting to a catcher in the 1986 season, as his defense was deemed not strong enough to get him to the majors. He made his major league debut in 1988, playing in 56 games. He became the primary catcher after the team traded Ernie Whitt following the 1989 season. On September 2, 1990, Borders caught Dave Stieb's no-hitter, the only one in Blue Jays history, as of the end of the 2025 season.

Borders was a key piece of the 1992 and 1993 World Series champion teams. In the 1992 Series, he hit .450 with one home run and three runs batted in (RBI); his batting average led the team among regular hitters and second overall to Deion Sanders (who batted in only four games). When the Jays won the series, Borders was named the World Series MVP, the sixth catcher, and the first since 1983, to win the award and the last catcher to win it until 2015.

Borders left the Jays as a free agent after the 1994 season, but never found a permanent home like Toronto had been for him in his seven years there. Over the following decade he played for the Kansas City Royals (1995), Houston Astros (1995), St. Louis Cardinals (1996), California Angels (1996), Chicago White Sox (1996), Cleveland Indians (1997-1999), returned to Toronto in 1999, Seattle Mariners (2001-2004), Minnesota Twins (2004), and again with the Mariners (2005), never playing in more than 55 games for any one team during a season.

Borders was signed by the Milwaukee Brewers to a minor league contract after the 2004 season. On May 19, 2005, he was acquired by Seattle from the Brewers for cash considerations and was assigned to Triple-A Tacoma of the Pacific Coast League. With Seattle's primary catcher Miguel Olivo struggling and backup catchers Dan Wilson and Wiki González injured, Borders became Seattle's primary catcher for most of the first half of the 2005 season. Seattle designated him for assignment shortly after the All-Star Break, bringing González back up. During his time in Triple-A Tacoma for the Mariners, Borders stated that he would rather remain in Triple-A, because he was closer to his family, enjoyed the lifestyle, and had enough money. He became a free agent after the season.

On January 25, 2006, the Los Angeles Dodgers signed Borders to a minor league contract and invited him to spring training. On May 27, he announced his retirement. Borders finished his major league career with a .253 batting average, 69 home runs, and 346 RBI in 1,099 games.

Borders is one of only six players to have won both a World Series championship and an Olympic gold medal, along with Sydney teammate Doug Mientkiewicz, Cuban players Orlando Hernández, José Contreras, and Yuli Gurriel, and Japanese player Yoshinobu Yamamoto.

== Post-retirement ==
On August 7, 2009, the Blue Jays held a pre-game ceremony at the Rogers Centre recognizing members of the 1992 and 1993 World Series teams, including Borders. As part of the event, Borders caught the ceremonial first pitch from Cito Gaston, then in his second stint as Blue Jays manager after leading the team to both Series titles.

Borders became the coach of the Winter Haven High School baseball team, where two of his sons played, following the 2012 season. He had been an assistant coach for the team.

In June 2015, Borders began his first season as manager of the Williamsport Crosscutters, the Philadelphia Phillies’ short-season single A affiliate. He led the team through 2021.

In 2024, Borders became an assistant coach for the Webber International Warriors.

== See also ==
- List of baseball players who are Olympic gold medalists and World Series champions
