= 2006 World Baseball Classic Pool B =

Pool B of the First Round of the 2006 World Baseball Classic was held at Chase Field, Phoenix and Scottsdale Stadium, Scottsdale, Arizona, United States from March 7 to 10, 2006.

Pool B was a round-robin tournament. Each team played the other three teams once, with the top two teams advancing to Pool 1.

== Standings ==
Pos	Team	Pld	W	L	RF	RA	RD	PCT	GB	Qualification
1	Mexico	3	2	1	19	7	+12	.667 (Note: Mexico 1.59 RA/9, United States 4.00 RA/9, Canada 7.50 RA/9.)	—	Advance to second round
2	United States (H)	3	2	1	25	8	+17	.667	—	Advance to second round
3	Canada	3	2	1	20	23	−3	.667	—	
4	South Africa	3	0	3	12	38	−26	.000	2	

(H) Hosts

== Results ==
- All times are Mountain Standard Time (UTC−07:00).

=== United States 2, Mexico 0 ===
March 7 14:00 at Chase Field
Team	1	2	3	4	5	6	7	8	9	R	H	E
Mexico	0	0	0	0	0	0	0	0	0	0	4	0
United States	0	0	0	1	0	0	1	0	X	2	6	1
WP: Mike Timlin (1–0) LP: Rodrigo López (0–1) Sv: Brad Lidge (1); Home runs: MEX: None; USA: Derrek Lee (1), Chipper Jones (1); Attendance: 32,727 (66.7%); Umpires: HP − Chris Guccione, 1B − Angel Campos, 2B − Mike Muchlinski, 3B − Neil Poulton; Boxscore

=== Canada 11, South Africa 8 ===
March 7 19:00 at Scottsdale Stadium
Team	1	2	3	4	5	6	7	8	9	R	H	E
Canada	0	0	0	0	3	0	4	0	4	11	12	2
South Africa	0	0	0	0	4	0	1	3	0	8	9	3
WP: Chris Reitsma (1–0) LP: Jared Elario (0–1) Sv: Jesse Crain (1); Home runs: CAN: Corey Koskie (1); RSA: None; Attendance: 5,829 (68.6%); Umpires: HP − Chris Griffith, 1B − Bob Davidson, 2B − Travis Reininger, 3B − Nelson Díaz; Boxscore

=== Canada 8, United States 6 ===
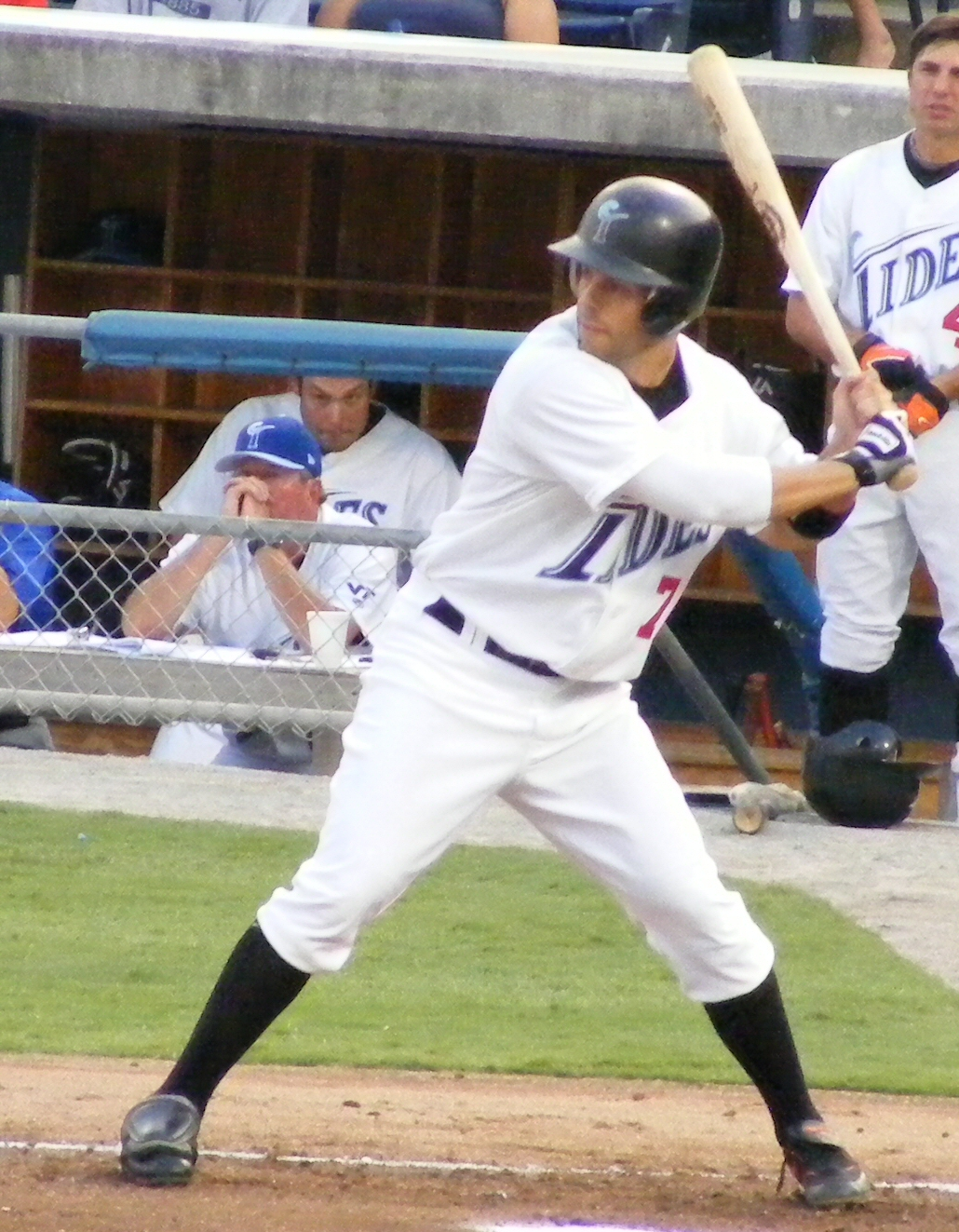
Adam Stern

March 8 14:00 at Chase Field
Team	1	2	3	4	5	6	7	8	9	R	H	E
Canada	1	1	3	2	1	0	0	0	0	8	13	1
United States	0	0	0	0	6	0	0	0	0	6	9	0
WP: Adam Loewen (1–0) LP: Dontrelle Willis (0–1) Sv: Steve Green (1); Home runs: CAN: Adam Stern (1); USA: Jason Varitek (1); Attendance: 16,993 (34.7%); Umpires: HP − Bob Davidson, 1B − Travis Reininger, 2B − Chris Griffith, 3B − Nelson Díaz; Boxscore

=== Mexico 10, South Africa 4 ===
March 8 19:00 at Scottsdale Stadium
Team	1	2	3	4	5	6	7	8	9	R	H	E
South Africa	0	0	0	3	0	0	1	0	0	4	11	3
Mexico	2	1	2	0	3	1	1	0	X	10	12	2
WP: Francisco Campos (1–0) LP: Darryn Smith (0–1); Home runs: RSA: None; MEX: Jorge Cantú (1); Attendance: 7,937 (93.4%); Umpires: HP − Mike Muchlinski, 1B − Chris Guccione, 2B − Angel Campos, 3B − Neil Poulton; Boxscore

=== Mexico 9, Canada 1 ===
March 9 18:00 at Chase Field
Team	1	2	3	4	5	6	7	8	9	R	H	E
Mexico	4	2	0	2	0	1	0	0	0	9	14	0
Canada	0	0	0	0	0	1	0	0	0	1	4	2
WP: Esteban Loaiza (1–0) LP: Jeff Francis (0–1); Home runs: MEX: Jorge Cantú (2), Mario Valenzuela (1); CAN: None; Attendance: 15,744 (32.1%); Umpires: HP − Travis Reininger, 1B − Chris Griffith, 2B − Bob Davidson, 3B − Nelson Díaz; Boxscore

=== United States 17, South Africa 0 ===
March 10 13:00 at Scottsdale Stadium
Team	1	2	3	4	5	6	7	8	9	R	H	E
United States	4	6	6	1	0	X	X	X	X	17	18	0
South Africa	0	0	0	0	0	X	X	X	X	0	2	1
WP: Roger Clemens (1–0) LP: Carl Michaels (0–1); Home runs: USA: Derrek Lee (2), Ken Griffey Jr. 2 (2); RSA: None; Attendance: 11,975 (140.9%); Umpires: HP − Angel Campos, 1B − Mike Muchlinski, 2B − Chris Guccione, 3B − Neil Poulton; Notes: Completed early due to 15–run mercy rule after 5 innings. Boxscore
