= 1999 Baltimore Orioles–Cuba national baseball team exhibition series =

Baseball games in Havana and Baltimore

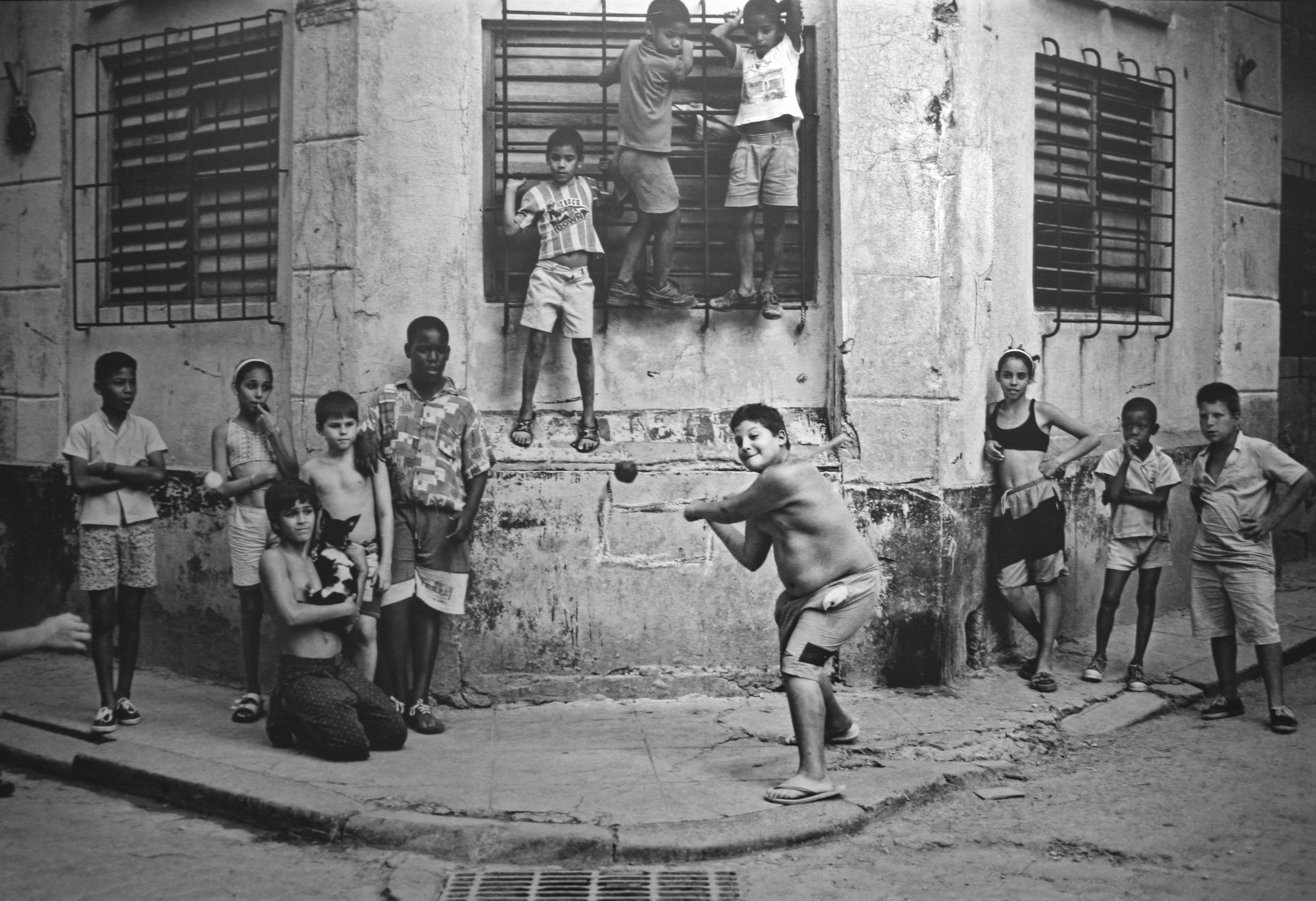
- Boys playing stickball in Havana, 1999
Team (Wins)	Manager(s)
Cuba (1)
Baltimore Orioles (1)	Ray Miller
- Dates: March 28, 1999; May 3, 1999
- Venue: Havana: Estadio Latinoamericano; Baltimore: Oriole Park at Camden Yards

Broadcast
- Television: ESPN (United States)
- TV announcers: Jon Miller, Joe Morgan

The 1999 Baltimore Orioles – Cuba national baseball team exhibition series consisted of two exhibition games played between the Baltimore Orioles of Major League Baseball (MLB) and the Cuba national baseball team on March 28 and May 3, 1999. The first game took place in Havana, while the second was held in Baltimore. This series marked the first time that the Cuba national team had faced a squad composed solely of major league players and the close of the hiatus since 1959 that an MLB team played in Cuba.

In the 1990s, Orioles' owner Peter Angelos lobbied the United States federal government to gain permission to hold this series for three years. Various politicians, including members of the United States House of Representatives, opposed the idea and attempted to block the series. Eventually, Angelos secured the approval in 1999, after a change in United States foreign policy to Cuba under President Bill Clinton, which eased travel restrictions and increased cultural exchange.

The Orioles won the first game, which was held in Havana, by a score of 3–2 in extra innings. The Cuba national team defeated the Orioles 12–6 in the second game, which was held in Baltimore. The series introduced José Contreras to the American baseball audience; Contreras defected from Cuba in 2002 to pitch in MLB. The United States and Cuba now compete with each other and other nations in the World Baseball Classic.

== Background ==
The Cuban Revolution led to the overthrow of Fulgencio Batista, an ally of the United States, in 1959. Fidel Castro severed Cuba's formerly strong ties with the United States. The United States soon instituted an embargo against Cuba, which has made it illegal for United States corporations to enter into business with Cuba. The Baltimore Orioles, who were slated to hold a 1960 exhibition series against the Cincinnati Reds in Havana, moved the games to Miami, Florida.

No Major League Baseball (MLB) team had played in Cuba since March 21, 1959. Castro made attempts to lure American baseball teams back to Cuba to no avail. In the 1970s, George McGovern, a United States senator, pushed the idea of an exchange of MLB and college basketball teams as a way to bridge the impasse between the two governments, similar to the ping-pong diplomacy that aided US-China relations; however, this was blocked by the United States Department of State.

In the 1980s, Scott Armstrong approached Edward Bennett Williams, then the owner of the Baltimore Orioles, to play a game between the Orioles and Cuba's All-Stars. Williams declined, as he had a position on an advisory board in the Reagan Administration, which opposed having any business with Cuba. Armstrong discussed the idea with MLB Commissioner Bart Giamatti and MLB Players Association (MLBPA) chair Donald Fehr. Giamatti was interested, but he died before he could pursue the idea. Fehr visited Cuba during the 1994-95 MLB strike, but could not secure an antitrust exemption.

In 1996, Peter Angelos, the new owner of the Orioles, met with Armstrong and Saul Landau, who convinced him to pursue an exhibition series between his Orioles and the Cuba national baseball team. Angelos petitioned the United States Government to permit a series. United States Representative Ileana Ros-Lehtinen wrote to the State Department, asking that the series be prevented. The United States Department of the Treasury denied Angelos' request on the grounds that American money may not be spent in Cuba under the Trading with the Enemy Act of 1917.

In January 1999, President Bill Clinton eased travel restrictions and increased cultural exchange between the United States and Cuba, leading Angelos to again seek permission to play an exhibition game in Cuba. Angelos met with Sandy Berger, Clinton's National Security Advisor, to discuss a potential exhibition. Bud Selig, the MLB Commissioner, allowed for the exploration of the series, though it still required the approval of MLB owners and the MLBPA. The MLBPA insisted on a second game to be held in the United States. A contingent of United States Representatives, including Ros-Lehtinen, Robert Menendez, Dan Burton, Lincoln Díaz-Balart, and Rick Lazio, lobbied Fehr to try to block the series.

Ongoing negotiations through March yielded an agreement on March 7, 1999, over the objections of the State Department. The proceeds of the series were a major sticking point in negotiations, as it violated the United States embargo against Cuba. Instead of going to the Cuban Government, it was agreed that proceeds would fund baseball programs in Cuba.

The series created a good deal of criticism, especially among the Cuban American community. MLB umpire Rich Garcia, who is of Cuban descent, opposed the series. MLB umpires filed a grievance against MLB attempting to block them from being sent to umpire the game in Cuba, and refused to officiate the game in Baltimore. The Cuban American National Foundation protested the series. Former US diplomat Otto Reich likened the baseball game in Havana to the notion of playing soccer at Auschwitz and also the 1936 Summer Olympics in Berlin, dismissing it as a propaganda ploy by the Cuban government.

== Games ==
=== Game one ===
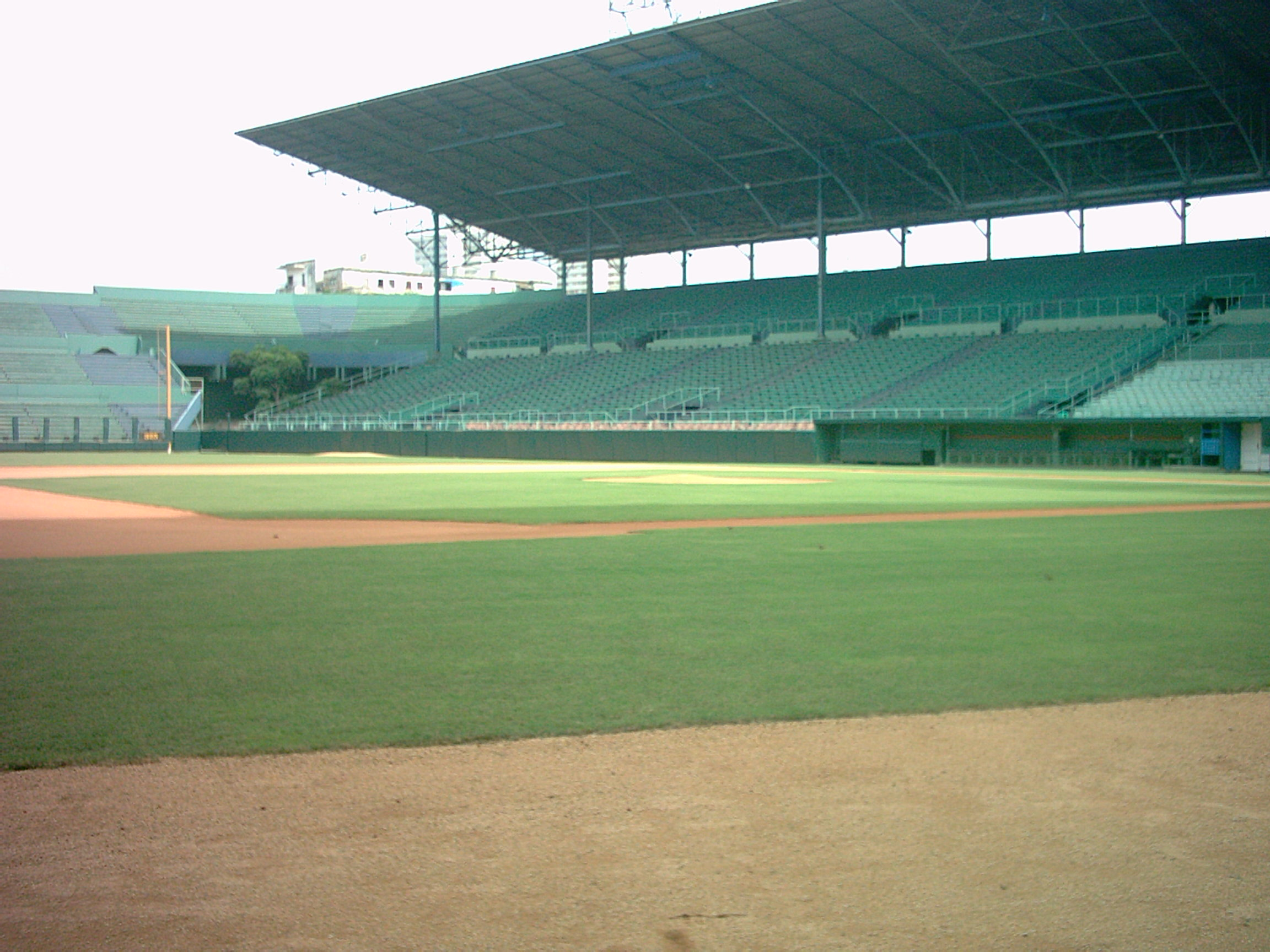
Estadio Latinoamericano in Havana hosted the first game of the series on March 28, 1999.

Game one took place at Estadio Latinoamericano in Havana, Cuba, on March 28, 1999. Tickets were distributed by invitation only. Angelos, Selig, and Castro sat together in box seats. One hundred schoolchildren from the Baltimore and Washington, D.C. area also traveled to Cuba on a plane chartered by Angelos. Before the game, players and coaches on both teams engaged in a flag ceremony. Castro greeted the Orioles on the field, and gave the Cuba team a pep talk. Cuba baseball legend Conrado Marrero threw out the first pitch. The game was televised in the U.S. by ESPN with Jon Miller and Joe Morgan announcing.

Orioles' starting pitcher Scott Erickson allowed one run on five hits in seven innings pitched. Cuba starter José Ibar allowed a home run to Charles Johnson and was relieved in the third inning by José Contreras. Contreras pitched eight innings without allowing a run. Orioles' manager Ray Miller brought in his closer, Mike Timlin, in the eighth inning. This backfired, as Omar Linares tied the game for Cuba with a run batted in single.

Tied after nine innings, the game went into extra innings. Cuba had two runners on base in the 10th inning, but Mike Fetters retired Cuba without allowing a run. The Orioles won the game when Harold Baines hit a single off of Pedro Luis Lazo that scored Will Clark with the go-ahead run in the top of the 11th inning. Jesse Orosco recorded the final three outs in the bottom of the 11th, as the Orioles won by a score of 3–2.

Line score

Team	1	2	3	4	5	6	7	8	9	10	11	R	H	E
Baltimore Orioles	0	2	0	0	0	0	0	0	0	0	1	3	6	0
Cuba National Baseball Team	0	0	0	0	0	0	1	1	0	0	0	2	10	0
WP: Mike Fetters LP: Pedro Luis Lazo Sv: Jesse Orosco; Home runs: BAL: Charles Johnson; CUB: None

Box score

Baltimore	AB	R	H	RBI
Brady Anderson, CF	4	0	1	0
Mike Bordick, SS	5	0	1	0
Will Clark, 1B	3	1	1	0
Albert Belle, RF	5	0	0	0
B. J. Surhoff, LF	3	1	1	0
Harold Baines, DH	5	0	1	1
Willis Otáñez, 3B	3	0	0	0
Jesse Garcia, 2B	1	0	0	0
Jeff Reboulet, 2B	3	0	0	0
Charles Johnson, C	3	0	0	0

Cuba	AB	R	H	RBI
José Estrada, CF	4	1	1	0
Luis Ulacia, LF	4	0	3	0
Yobal Dueñas, 2B	5	0	0	0
Omar Linares, 3B	5	0	1	1
Andy Morales, DH	5	1	2	0
Loidel Chapellí, 1B	4	0	1	0
Enrique Esteban Díaz, PR	0	0	0	0
Robelquis Videaux, RF	5	0	1	1
Juan Manrique, C	2	0	0	0
Eduardo Cardenas, PH	1	0	0	0
Ariel Pestano, C	2	0	0	0
Juan Carlos Moreno, SS	2	0	0	0
Roger Machado, PH	1	0	0	0
Danel Castro, SS	1	0	1	0

Baltimore	IP	H	R	ER	BB	SO	HR
Scott Erickson	7	5	1	1	2	2	0
Arthur Rhodes	0 2/3	1	1	1	0	0	0
Mike Timlin	1 1/3	1	0	0	0	2	0
Mike Fetters, W	1	2	0	0	0	2	0
Jesse Orosco, Sv	1	1	0	0	0	0	0

Cuba	IP	H	R	ER	BB	SO	HR
José Ibar	2	2	2	2	1	1	1
José Contreras	8	2	0	0	4	10	0
Pedro Luis Lazo, L	0 2/3	2	1	1	1	1	0
Ernesto Guevara Ramos	0 1/3	0	0	0	1	0	0

=== Game two ===
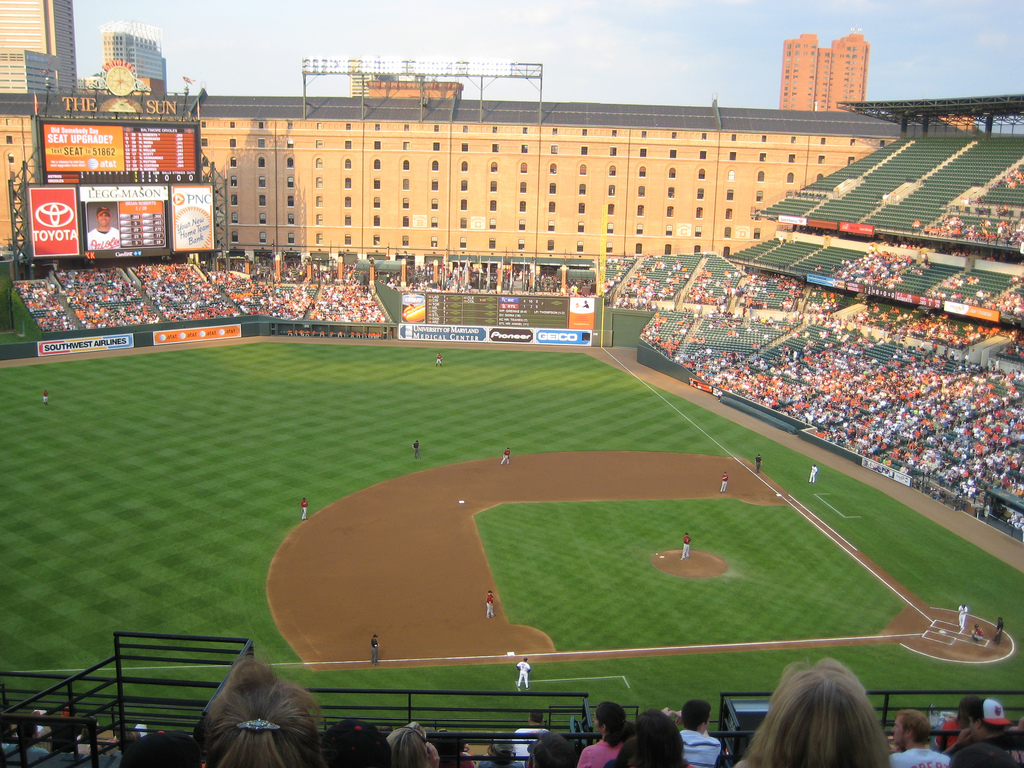
The second game of the series took place at Oriole Park at Camden Yards in Baltimore on May 3, 1999. This photo depicts the stadium in 2008.

The second game was held at Oriole Park at Camden Yards in Baltimore on May 3, 1999, in front of 47,940 fans. By May 3, the Orioles had a 7–17 win–loss record in the 1999 MLB season. The Cuba national team, meanwhile, was stronger than during the first game; the 1998–99 Cuban National Series was finished so players not available for the first game joined the team for the second exhibition game. A 300-person delegation accompanied the Cuba team, including members of the Cuban media, students, and retired players. MLB requested the Federal Aviation Administration clear the airspace above Camden Yards for the game, in response to an attempt by a Miami-based pilot and veteran of the Bay of Pigs Invasion, to drop anti-Castro leaflets over Estadio Latinoamericano during the first game.

The start of the game was delayed by rain for 56 minutes. The game was further interrupted by protesters, one of whom ran onto the field during the fifth inning and was thrown to the ground by César Valdez, a Cuban umpire. Contreras started the game for Cuba, and he allowed a two-run double by Baines in the first inning. Orioles' starting pitcher Scott Kamieniecki, who was on the MLB disabled list at the time, allowed four runs in the second inning to give Cuba the lead.

Norge Luis Vera entered the game for Cuba in the third inning and pitched 6 2/3 innings in relief without allowing a hit, retiring 20 of the first 22 batters he faced. His hitless streak ended when he allowed a home run to Delino DeShields in the ninth inning. Gabe Molina, who had made his MLB debut on May 1, allowed Cuba to score five runs in the ninth inning, including a three-run home run hit by Andy Morales. The Cuba national team defeated the Orioles 12–6.

Danel Castro batted 4-for-5 for Cuba, including a two run batted in (RBI) triple, and scored four runs. Calvin Pickering, a rookie first baseman for the Orioles who had been promoted from the minor leagues the day prior, committed three errors.

Linescore

Team	1	2	3	4	5	6	7	8	9	R	H	E
Cuba National Baseball Team	0	4	2	0	0	0	1	0	5	12	18	1
Baltimore Orioles	2	1	0	0	0	0	0	0	3	6	6	3
WP: Norge Luis Vera LP: Scott Kamieniecki; Home runs: CUB: Andy Morales; Home: Delino DeShields

Box score

Cuba	AB	R	H	RBI
Luis Ulacia, RF	6	2	2	2
Robelquis Videaux, CF	4	0	1	1
Omar Linares, 3B	4	1	4	1
Orestes Kindelán, 1B	4	1	1	1
Andy Morales, DH	5	1	3	3
Antonio Pacheco, 2B	6	0	0	0
Ariel Pestano, C	5	1	3	0
Oscar Machado, LF	4	2	0	0
Danel Castro, SS	5	4	4	2

Baltimore	AB	R	H	RBI
Brady Anderson, CF	5	0	1	1
Mike Bordick, SS	3	1	0	0
Rich Amaral, LF	0	0	0	0
B. J. Surhoff, LF	3	0	0	0
Jesse Garcia, SS	0	0	0	0
Albert Belle, RF	3	1	0	0
Gene Kingsale, RF	0	0	0	0
Harold Baines, DH	3	0	1	2
Calvin Pickering, 1B	4	1	1	0
Willis Otáñez, 3B	4	2	1	0
Delino DeShields, 2B	4	1	1	3
Charles Johnson, C	4	0	1	0

Cuba	IP	H	R	ER	BB	SO
José Contreras	1 1/3	3	3	2	2	1
Norge Luis Vera, W	7	3	3	3	2	4
Ormari Romero	0 2/3	0	0	0	0	1

Baltimore	IP	H	R	ER	BB	SO
Scott Kamieniecki, L	1 1/3	5	4	3	3	0
Doug Linton	1 2/3	4	2	2	1	3
Ricky Bones	3	4	0	0	0	3
Mike Fetters	2	1	1	0	2	1
Gabe Molina	1	4	5	5	1	1

== Aftermath ==
Rigoberto Herrera, a retired Cuba national team member who accompanied the Cuba delegation, defected to the United States during the visit. Six retired players overslept the day after the game in Baltimore and missed their flight back to Cuba, but no other members of the delegation defected.

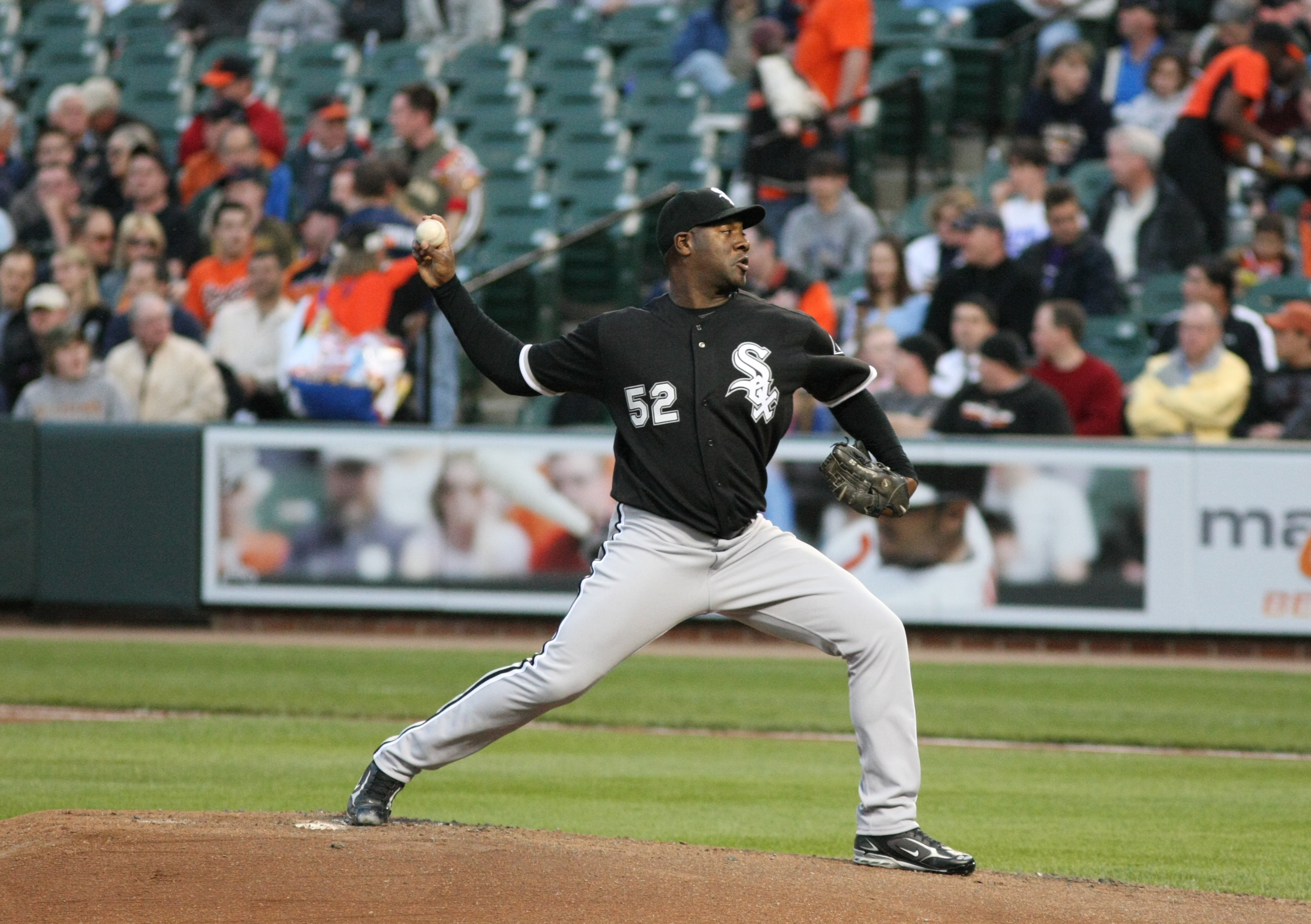
José Contreras pitching for the Chicago White Sox in 2008

To discourage defections during the exhibition in Baltimore, Cuba maintained strict security around their young players, not allowing sports agents to speak with them. Though no active Cuba players defected during the trip to Baltimore, members of the Cuba national team did defect in the years following the series. Andy Morales defected in 2000. Contreras, who was considered Cuba's best pitcher, gained international fame after the series and defected from Cuba in 2002. Nelson Díaz, a Cuban umpire who officiated the game in Baltimore, defected from Cuba to the United States in 2009.

MLB and the Major League Umpires Association engaged in a dispute regarding the amount of pay owed to umpires for officiating the game that took place in Baltimore. This was one factor that led to the mass resignation of MLB umpires that took place on September 2, 1999.

In 2000, Syd Thrift, the Orioles' general manager, told The Washington Times that the team had a practice of not signing players who had defected from Cuba, which he attributed to Angelos' desire to avoid doing "anything that could be interpreted as being disrespectful or ... encouraging players to defect". Investigations by Major League Baseball and the United States Department of Justice did not find evidence that the absence of Cuban players on the Orioles' roster or in its minor league system was due to discrimination.

The Cuba national team next played in the United States during the 2006 World Baseball Classic (WBC). President George W. Bush attempted to prevent the Cuba team from participating in the tournament, but other nations promised to withdraw if Cuba was barred. The next American team to travel to Cuba was the Tampa Bay Rays, which played an exhibition against the Cuba national team in March 2016.

== See also ==
- 1999 in baseball
- American Series
- Cuba–United States relations
- Ping-pong diplomacy
- Cuban thaw
