= Danel (name) =

Danel is both a surname and a given name. Notable people with the name include:

- Alejandro Danel (1791–1865), French soldier
- Jean-Pierre Danel (born 1968), French guitarist
- Pascal Danel (born 1944), French singer
- Danel Castro (born 1976), Cuban baseball player
- Danel Sinani (born 1997), Luxembourgish footballer
