= Yohandy Morales =

American baseball player (born 2001)

- Morales with the Washington Nationals in 2026

Washington Nationals – No. 28
- Third baseman / First baseman
- Born: October 9, 2001 (age 25); Miami, Florida, U.S.
- Bats: Right Throws: Right

MLB debut
- September 1, 2026, for the Washington Nationals

MLB statistics (through 2026 season)
- Batting average: .255
- Home runs: 4
- Runs batted in: 10
- Stats at Baseball Reference

Teams
- Washington Nationals (2026–present)
Medals
Men's baseball
Representing United States
U-12 Baseball World Cup
| Gold medal – first place | 2013 Taipei | Team |
Haarlem Baseball Week
| Bronze medal – third place | 2022 | Team |

Yohandy Morales (born October 9, 2001) is an American professional baseball third baseman and first baseman for the Washington Nationals of Major League Baseball (MLB).

== Amateur career ==
Morales attended G. Holmes Braddock Senior High School in Miami, Florida. He was selected for the 2019 Under Armour All-America Baseball Game at Wrigley Field. He was considered a prospect for the shortened 2020 Major League Baseball draft, but went unselected and enrolled at the University of Miami to play college baseball.

As a freshman at Miami in 2021, Morales became a part of the starting lineup and appeared in 53 games, mainly at third base. For the season, he batted .284 with 11 home runs, 45 RBI, and 13 doubles. That summer, he played in the Cape Cod Baseball League with the Wareham Gatemen, and had a .182/.308/.236 slash line while primarily playing first base and third base.

As a sophomore for Miami in 2022, Morales played in sixty games at third base and slashed .329/.411/.650 with 18 home runs, 59 RBI, and 17 doubles. In Miami's opening game of the 2022 NCAA Division I baseball tournament, Morales hit three home runs in a win over Canisius College, making him the fourth player in Miami history to hit three home runs in one game. After the season, he was selected to the USA Baseball National Collegiate Team. For the 2023 season with Miami, Morales hit .408 with twenty home runs and seventy RBI.

== Professional career ==
The Washington Nationals selected Morales in the second round, with the 40th overall pick, in the 2023 Major League Baseball draft. He signed for $2,600,000 on July 18, 2023.

Morales made his professional debut after signing and played the 2023 season with the Florida Complex League Nationals, Fredericksburg Nationals, Wilmington Blue Rocks and Harrisburg Senators and hit .349 with 32 RBI over 42 games. Morales missed time in 2024 due to injury but still appeared in 75 games between Fredericksburg and Harrisburg, batting .283 with seven home runs and 41 RBI. He opened the 2025 season with Harrisburg and was promoted to the Rochester Red Wings in May. Over 128 games between the two teams, Morales hit .265 with 15 home runs, 71 RBI, and 31 doubles. Morales was assigned back to Rochester to start the 2026 season. Across 104 games, he hit .286 with 25 home runs and 76 RBI.

The Nationals selected Morales' contract and promoted him to the major leagues September 1, 2026. He made his MLB debut that night as the team's starting designated hitter against the Atlanta Braves, and recorded his first MLB hit, a solo home run off Braves starter AJ Smith-Shawver, in his second at-bat. He finished his debut 3-for-5 with his solo home run, a double, and a single. Morales played in a total of 17 games for the Nationals and ended the season with a .255 batting average, four home runs, and 10 RBI across 47 at bats.

== Personal life ==
Morales was born to Andy Morales and Daiyana Castillo. Andy Morales played for the Cuban national baseball team and, for part of two seasons, in the minor leagues for the New York Yankees and Boston Red Sox organizations.
