= José Ramos (baseball) =

Panamanian baseball player (born 2001)

Free agent
- Outfielder
- Born: January 1, 2001 (age 25); Chepo, Panama
- Bats: Right Throws: Right

José Antonio Ramos (born January 1, 2001) is a Panamanian professional baseball outfielder who is a free agent.

== Career ==
=== Los Angeles Dodgers ===
Ramos signed with the Los Angeles Dodgers as an international free agent in July 2018. He made his professional debut in 2019 with the Dominican Summer League Dodgers.

Ramos did not play in a game in 2020 due to the cancellation of the minor league season because of the COVID-19 pandemic. He returned in 2021 to play for the rookie-level Arizona Complex League Dodgers and Rancho Cucamonga Quakes, batting .329 in 62 games. In 2022, Ramos played for Rancho Cucamonga and the Great Lakes Loons and after the season, played for the Panama national baseball team in the 2023 World Baseball Classic qualification.

Ramos hit .240 in 113 games with 19 home runs and 68 RBI in 2023 for the Double-A Tulsa Drillers and was selected to participate in the inaugural "Spring Breakout" minor league showcase during spring training 2024. He returned to Tulsa for the regular season, playing in 123 games and batting .221 with 17 home runs and 64 RBI. Ramos returned to Tulsa for the 2025 season and was then promoted to the Triple–A Oklahoma City Comets. Combined, he played in 102 games with a .251 batting average, 18 home runs and 59 RBI. Ramos elected free agency following the season on November 6, 2025.

=== New York Mets ===
On November 25, 2025, Ramos signed a minor league contract with the New York Mets. In 123 games between Double-A and Triple-A he batted .237/.345/.412 with 19 home runs, 71 RBIs and 11 stolen bases. He elected free agency on November 2.
