= List of baseball players who are Olympic gold medalists and World Series champions =

This is a partial list of baseball players who Olympic gold medalists and World Series champion, listing people who have won at least one Olympic gold medal and World Series.

Player	Nation	Position	Summer Olympics	World Series	Team	Ref.
Orlando Hernández	Cuba	Starting pitcher	1992 Barcelona	1998	New York Yankees	
Orlando Hernández	Cuba	Starting pitcher	1992 Barcelona	1999	New York Yankees	
Orlando Hernández	Cuba	Starting pitcher	1992 Barcelona	2000	New York Yankees	
Orlando Hernández	Cuba	Starting pitcher	1992 Barcelona	2005	Chicago White Sox	
José Contreras	Cuba	Starting pitcher	1996 Atlanta	2005	Chicago White Sox	
Pat Borders	United States	Catcher	2000 Sydney	1992	Toronto Blue Jays	
Pat Borders	United States	Catcher	2000 Sydney	1993	Toronto Blue Jays	
Doug Mientkiewicz	United States	First baseman	2000 Sydney	2004	Boston Red Sox	
Yuli Gurriel	Cuba	First baseman	2004 Athens	2017	Houston Astros	
Yuli Gurriel	Cuba	First baseman	2004 Athens	2022	Houston Astros	
Yoshinobu Yamamoto	Japan	Starting pitcher	2020 Tokyo	2024	Los Angeles Dodgers	
Yoshinobu Yamamoto	Japan	Starting pitcher	2020 Tokyo	2025	Los Angeles Dodgers	

== See also ==
- List of World Series champions
- List of Olympic medalists in baseball
