= Andy Morales =

Cuban baseball player

- Infielder
- Born: December 3, 1974 (age 51); Ciego de Ávila, Cuba
- Bats: Right Throws: Right
- Stats at Baseball Reference

Andy Morales (born December 3, 1974, Ciego de Ávila, Cuba) is a Cuban former professional baseball player. He played third base domestically for La Habana in the Cuban National Series and for the Cuban national baseball team in international play before he defected from Cuba in 2000. Coming to the United States, Morales played in minor league baseball for the New York Yankees and Boston Red Sox organizations in 2001 and 2002.

== Career ==
=== Cuba ===
Morales played for La Habana in the Cuban National Series. He also played the Cuban national baseball team in an exhibition series against the Baltimore Orioles of Major League Baseball, hitting a three-run home run in the game held in Baltimore.

Morales attempted to defect from Cuba in June 2000 with the help of agent Gus Dominguez. Caught at sea by the United States Coast Guard along with 30 other Cubans seeking asylum in the United States, he was returned to Cuba under the "wet feet, dry feet policy". He was allowed to return home, but was not considered for the 2000 Summer Olympics. Morales successfully defected from Cuba later in 2000 and established his residency in Peru.

=== United States minor leagues ===
Declared a free agent, Morales signed with the New York Yankees in February 2001 to a four-year contract worth US$4.5 million. After he batted .231/.287/.281 with one home run in 48 games for the Norwich Navigators of the Class AA Eastern League, the Yankees placed him on waivers. He cleared waivers and was sent outright to Norwich. The Yankees attempted to void his contract when it discovered that he had underreported his age by three years.

The Yankees released Morales on July 31, and he played in 10 games for the Sonoma County Crushers of the Western Baseball League for the remainder of the 2001 season. Morales signed with the Boston Red Sox for the 2002 season, and he played for the Trenton Thunder of the Eastern League, batting .231/.348/.282.

== Personal ==
When Morales defected, he left behind his wife Daiyana and their seven-month-old son. They obtained visas in order to join Andy in the United States. His other son, Yohandy Morales, was drafted by the Washington Nationals in the second round of the 2023 MLB draft.

== See also ==
- List of baseball players who defected from Cuba
