= Doug Mientkiewicz =

American baseball player and manager (born 1974)

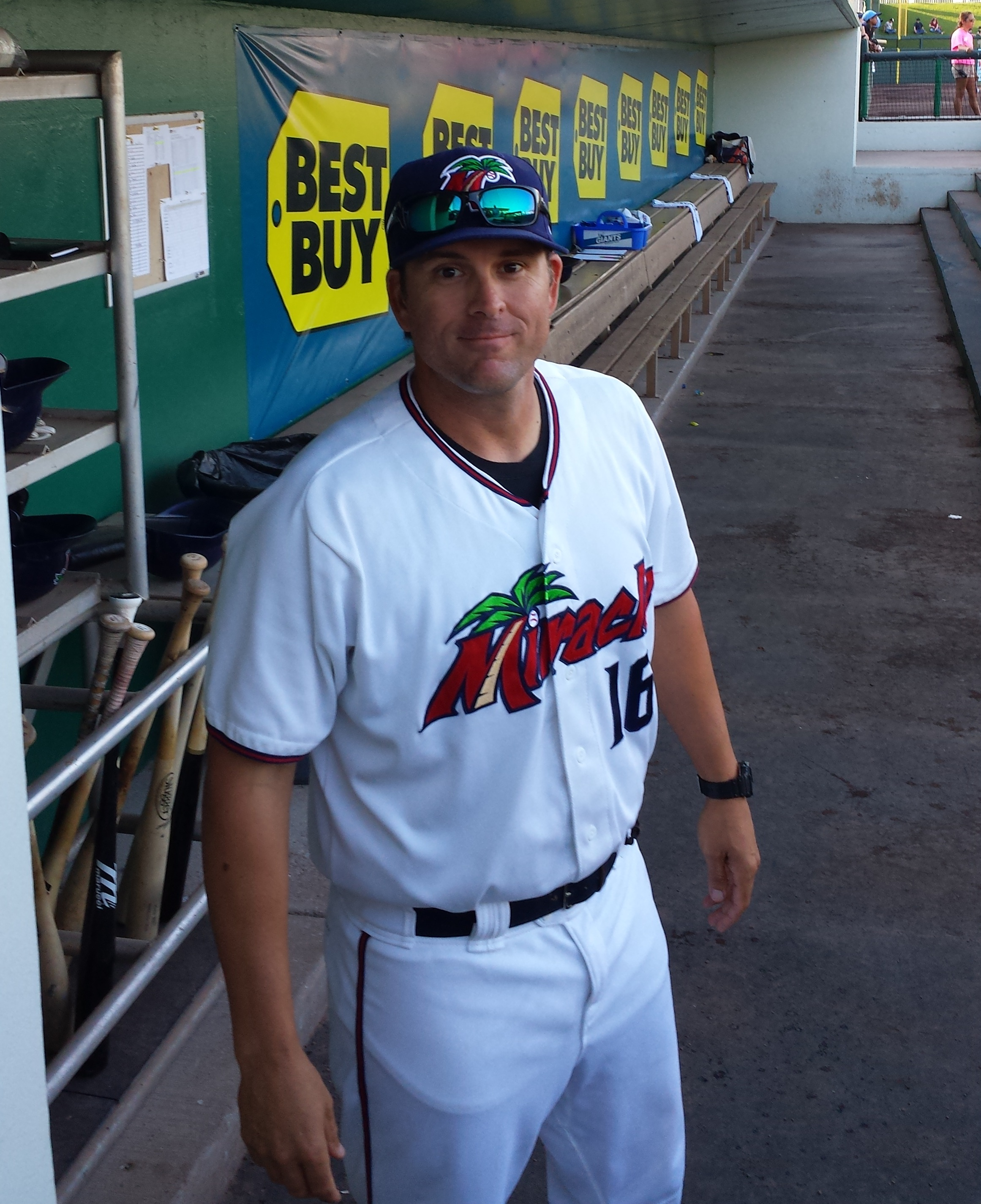
- Mientkiewicz as the Fort Myers Miracle manager in 2014
- First baseman
- Born: June 19, 1974 (age 52); Toledo, Ohio, U.S.
- Batted: Left Threw: Right

MLB debut
- September 18, 1998, for the Minnesota Twins

Last MLB appearance
- October 4, 2009, for the Los Angeles Dodgers

MLB statistics
- Batting average: .271
- Home runs: 66
- Runs batted in: 405
- Stats at Baseball Reference

Teams
- Minnesota Twins (1998–2004); Boston Red Sox (2004); New York Mets (2005); Kansas City Royals (2006); New York Yankees (2007); Pittsburgh Pirates (2008); Los Angeles Dodgers (2009)

Career highlights and awards
- World Series champion (2004); Gold Glove Award (2001)
Medals
Men's baseball
Representing United States
Olympic Games
Gold medal – first place	2000 Sydney	Team

Douglas Andrew Mientkiewicz (/mɪntˈkeɪvɪtʃ/ mint-KAY-vitch; born June 19, 1974) is an American former professional baseball player and manager. He played in Major League Baseball as a first baseman from 1998 to 2009, most prominently as a member of the Minnesota Twins where he was a Gold Glove Award winner. He was also a member of the 2004 World Series winning Boston Red Sox team. He is one of six players to win both an Olympic gold medal and a World Series championship.

After his playing career, Mientkiewicz briefly worked as a television sports analyst before serving as a minor league manager in the Los Angeles Dodgers and Detroit Tigers organizations.

== Amateur career ==
Mientkiewicz attended Westminster Christian School in Palmetto Bay, Florida, where he was a teammate of Alex Rodriguez and Dan Perkins. Mientkiewicz had a batting cage in his backyard which his high school teammates would use as they pleased. He and Rodriguez were on the WCS basketball team. Mientkiewicz also was a tight end on the football team while Rodriguez was a quarterback.

After Mientkiewicz graduated from high school, the Toronto Blue Jay selected him in the 12th round of the 1992 Major League Baseball draft, but he chose instead to attend Florida State University in Tallahassee to play college baseball for the Florida State Seminoles. In his third season with the Seminoles, he led the team with a .371 batting average, 19 home runs, and 80 runs batted in (RBIs). Florida State won their first Atlantic Coast Conference Championship, and Mientkiewicz was named Atlantic Coast Conference Atlantic I Regional Most Valuable Player. After the season, he was drafted by the Minnesota Twins in the fifth round of the 1995 Major League Baseball draft. He was elected to the Florida State University Athletics Hall of Fame in 2005.

== Minor league career ==
In 1998, he batted .323, with a .432 on-base percentage and .508 slugging percentage in 509 at-bats for the New Britain Rock Cats to earn Eastern League (Double-A) All-Star honors, and a September call-up to the Twins. He batted .200 with two runs batted in in 25 at-bats for the Twins.

Mientkiewicz earned a roster spot with the Twins the following spring without having playing in Triple-A, and batted .229 with two home runs and 32 runs batted in sharing playing time with Ron Coomer at first base in 1999. After a full season in the majors, Mientkiewicz spent the 2000 season with the Twins' Triple-A affiliate, the Salt Lake Buzz. He was the Triple-A All-Star first baseman, and Pacific Coast League All-Star designated hitter. He batted .334, with a .446 on-base percentage and a .524 slugging percentage in 485 at-bats for Salt Lake, while both scoring and driving in 96 runs.

After the Triple-A season, Mientkiewicz joined the U.S. Olympic team at the 2000 games in Sydney. Mientkiewicz hit the go-ahead grand slam against South Korea in the semi-finals to help the U.S. capture its first-ever gold medal in baseball. After having doubts about his future as a ball player, he credits this experience for saving his career. After the Olympics, he played three games with the Twins, collecting six hits in fourteen at-bats.

In LVBP he played one season with Navegantes del Magallanes in the 1999–2000 season batting for .268 with 2 homers and 10 RBI.

== Major league career ==
=== Minnesota Twins ===
In 2001, Mientkiewicz was awarded the starting first base job for the Twins, and responded by batting .306 with fifteen home runs and 74 runs batted in (all career highs) while earning the American League Gold Glove award for top defensive first baseman. His numbers dipped in 2002; however, he reached the post-season for the first time in his career, and hit two home runs in the 2002 American League Division Series against the Oakland Athletics. The Twins battled the Chicago White Sox and Kansas City Royals for the division crown all season long in 2003.

Mientkiewicz drew the ire of the Chicago White Sox and their fans by suggesting that the All-Star Game, scheduled to be played at U.S. Cellular Field on July 15, should be moved to a different venue after a fan attacked umpire Laz Diaz during an April 15 game between the White Sox and Royals. Chicago White Sox General Manager Kenny Williams shot back that Mientkiewicz should not worry about the game's location because he would not be there.

After a mid-September three-game sweep over the White Sox at the Hubert H. Humphrey Metrodome that gave the Twins a 3 1/2 game lead in the American League Central, Mientkiewicz again got himself in the crosshairs by commenting in a postgame television interview, "They're done," about his Central Division rivals. The Twins won the division by four games over the Chicago White Sox, but were eliminated by the New York Yankees in the 2003 American League Division Series.

=== Boston Red Sox ===
As the trade deadline approached, the 2004 Boston Red Sox found themselves 8 1/2 games in back of the New York Yankees in the American League East, and one game in back of the Texas Rangers in the wild card race. With infield defense proving to be their Achilles' heel, they made a four-team trade deadline deal on July 31 that landed Mientkiewicz and Montreal Expos shortstop Orlando Cabrera with the Boston Red Sox, and sent Justin Jones to the Twins. The Red Sox also sent Nomar Garciaparra and Matt Murton to the Chicago Cubs, and the Cubs sent Francis Beltrán, Alex Gonzalez and Brendan Harris to the Expos as part of this trade. Coincidentally, the Twins were playing a home series against the Red Sox at the time. On July 30, 2004, Mientkiewicz went 2–4, scoring one run as a member of the Minnesota Twins. The next day, July 31, 2004, Mientkiewicz was in the visiting dugout as a member of the Boston Red Sox, and started at first base and hit sixth in the lineup.

Mientkiewicz and Cabrera proved valuable additions to their new franchise as the Red Sox surged to within three games of the Yankees by the end of the season, and took the A.L. wild card by seven games over the Oakland A's. On August 16, Mientkiewicz made an emergency start at second base, a position he had only ever played four times in the minor leagues, and never in the majors.

Mientkiewicz went 4-for-10 in the post-season. He did not appear in any of the first three games of the 2004 American League Championship Series that the Red Sox lost to the New York Yankees; however, he appeared in all of the final four that they won in their come-from-behind series win. In the final game of the 2004 World Series, Mientkiewicz was playing first when St. Louis Cardinals shortstop Édgar Rentería grounded back to pitcher Keith Foulke. When he threw the ball to first to complete Boston's four-game sweep of the World Series, Mientkiewicz kept the ball, as dictated by baseball tradition. As Boston had not won a World Series in 86 years, the ball symbolized the end of the so-called "Curse of the Bambino", and was of considerable interest to memorabilia collectors.

Controversy resulted when Mientkiewicz joked to a reporter that he would sell the ball. The Red Sox then asked for the ball's return so it could be displayed in a museum, and Mientkiewicz refused to give it back. He talked directly with team president Larry Lucchino and principal owner John Henry about the ball. Years later, Mientkiewicz said he suggested that a portion of the admissions should go to charity, but Lucchino refused. Shortly after his January 27 trade to the New York Mets, Mientkiewicz and the Red Sox reached an agreement that the Red Sox would hold the ball temporarily and could display it across New England, along with the World Series trophy. The agreement called for Mientkiewicz to get the ball back at the end of 2005 unless the ultimate issue of ownership has been otherwise resolved. In the controversy that followed, Mientkiewicz received death threats against himself and his wife.

On November 30, 2005, lawyers for the Red Sox filed suit in Suffolk Superior Court asking the court to place the ball in a secure location until ownership was decided. The club's legal team said that Mientkiewicz had gained possession of the ball only because he was a Red Sox employee and that the ball remained the team's property. The organization soon after dropped the case in order to grieve the issue in arbitration. On April 23, 2006, it was announced that he had reached an agreement with the Red Sox, and the ball would go to the Baseball Hall of Fame.

=== New York Mets ===
In January 2005, Mientkiewicz was traded to the Mets for minor league first baseman Ian Bladergroen and cash. He began the 2005 season as the Mets' everyday first baseman, but lost his starting job to prospect Mike Jacobs by the end of the season after missing time due to multiple injuries.

=== Kansas City Royals ===
Mientkiewicz signed a one-year deal with the Kansas City Royals. During the following season with the Kansas City Royals, he compiled a .283 batting average and 43 runs batted in, his most since playing with Minnesota. He was not offered a contract by the Royals, and on January 5, 2007, he signed a one-year deal with the New York Yankees.

=== New York Yankees ===
On June 2, 2007, Mientkiewicz collided with Mike Lowell of the Boston Red Sox while trying to field a throw from shortstop Derek Jeter. He suffered a mild concussion and a fractured scaphoid bone in his right wrist and was placed on the disabled list. Mientkiewicz missed three months of the season, and did not return until September 4. He made his first start since the injury on September 16, and went two-for-three in the Yankees' 4–3 victory over the Red Sox. Mientkiewicz was injured in an on-field incident when a cameraman collided with him before Game 1 of the ALDS.

For the season, he batted .277 with five home runs and 24 runs batted in. He made the post-season for the fourth time in his career, and was hitless in six at-bats.

=== Pittsburgh Pirates ===
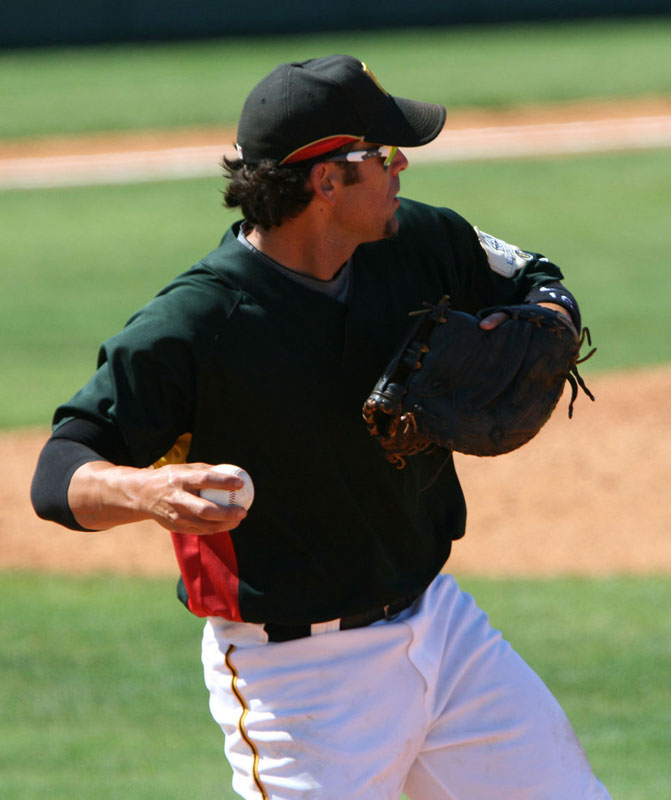
Mientkiewicz with the Pirates in Spring Training 2008

On February 11, 2008, Mientkiewicz signed a minor league contract with an invitation to spring training with the Pittsburgh Pirates. In his only season in Pittsburgh, he batted .277 with two home runs and 30 runs batted in, mostly backing up Adam LaRoche at first base. He also made 33 appearances at third base and ten in right field. He briefly left the team during the season while his wife, Jodi, had heart surgery.

=== Los Angeles Dodgers ===
On February 26, 2009, Mientkiewicz signed a minor league contract with an invitation to spring training with the Los Angeles Dodgers. He made the Major League roster as a pinch hitter and appeared in seven games for the Dodgers in April before dislocating his shoulder sliding into second base and being placed on the 60-day disabled list. After a brief rehab stint with the Triple-A Albuquerque Isotopes from July 28 to August 17, Mientkiewicz rejoined the Dodgers in September, seeing sporadic action as a pinch hitter down the stretch. He had six hits in eighteen at-bats, only one of which was for extra bases, and had three runs batted in.

Mientkiewicz signed a minor league contract with the Dodgers for the 2010 season, and came to camp to compete for the left-handed pinch hitter role. He was offered a coaching position with the team when he did not make the club out of spring training, but opted instead to keep playing and become a free agent.

=== Florida Marlins ===
On May 5, 2010, he signed a minor league contract with the Florida Marlins, but was released just nine days later after playing four games for the Marlins' Triple A affiliate, the New Orleans Zephyrs. Mientkiewicz's deal included a one-day out clause for May 16, and the Marlins chose to cut him loose before he could exercise it.

Following his release, Mientkiewicz chose to retire from baseball.

== Broadcasting ==
After retirement, Mientkiewicz worked as an analyst for the 2010 MLB post-season for CBSSports.com. He was hired in 2020 as an on-air personality for ESPN's ACC Network alongside Gaby Sanchez, Javier Lopez, and Adam Greenberg.

Mientkiewicz has been a frequent and outspoken guest on former teammate A.J. Pierzynski's podcast Foul Territory. During his appearances, he has spoken out against the Red Sox organization's handling of the final out ball from the 2004 World Series. Mientkiewicz also voiced his displeasure with his former high school teammate Alex Rodriguez, saying he will "die a lonely man." Soon afterwards, he also criticized the Twins organization for the way it handled its top prospect Byron Buxton during his time as a manager in the minors.

== Coaching/managing ==
Mientkiewicz made his coaching debut in 2012 in the Los Angeles Dodgers organization as the hitting coach of the rookie league Ogden Raptors in the Pioneer League. After 2012, he was hired by the Minnesota Twins organization as the manager of the high-Class A Fort Myers Miracle, the team he played for in 1995–96 to start his baseball career. He got the Miracle off to a fast start in 2013 as the team tied a franchise record by winning their first 14 games of the season (equaling the mark set in 1995 and tied in 2007) and ended April with a Minor League best 21 wins (21–4).

In October 2014, Mientkiewicz was a finalist to become the manager of the Minnesota Twins. Paul Molitor was selected as Twins manager, and Mientkiewicz managed the Double-A Chattanooga Lookouts in 2015–16 before returning to Fort Myers for a second term as the Miracle's skipper. In 2017, Mientkiewicz won Coach of the Year honors and made the Florida State League All-Star roster. He was fired after the 2017 season.

On November 16, 2017, Mientkiewicz was named the manager of the Toledo Mud Hens, the Detroit Tigers' Triple-A affiliate. On October 31, 2019, he was fired by the Mud Hens.

Mientkiewicz has served as a team manager for MLB's and USA Baseball's Prospect Development Pipeline League since 2022.

== See also ==
- List of baseball players who are Olympic gold medalists and World Series champions
- List of Olympic medalists in baseball
