= José Contreras =

Cuban baseball player (born 1971)

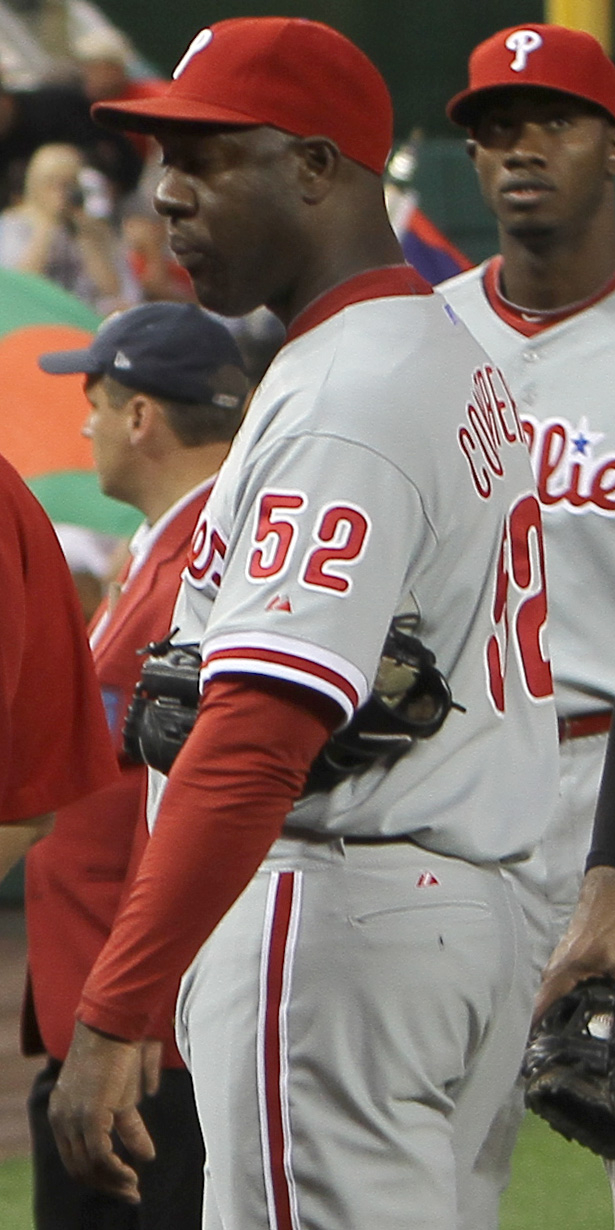
- Contreras with the Philadelphia Phillies in 2010
- Pitcher
- Born: December 6, 1971 (age 54); Las Martinas, Pinar del Río, Cuba
- Batted: Right Threw: Right

MLB debut
- March 31, 2003, for the New York Yankees

Last MLB appearance
- May 27, 2013, for the Pittsburgh Pirates

MLB statistics
- Win–loss record: 78–67
- Earned run average: 4.57
- Strikeouts: 889
- Stats at Baseball Reference

Teams
- New York Yankees (2003–2004); Chicago White Sox (2004–2009); Colorado Rockies (2009); Philadelphia Phillies (2010–2012); Pittsburgh Pirates (2013)

Career highlights and awards
- All-Star (2006); World Series champion (2005)
Medals
Men's baseball
Representing Cuba
Summer Olympics
Gold medal – first place	1996 Atlanta	Team
Silver medal – second place	2000 Sydney	Team
Pan American Games
Gold medal – first place	1999 Winnipeg	Team
Baseball World Cup
Gold medal – first place	1998 Italy	Team
Gold medal – first place	2001 Taipei	Team
Intercontinental Cup
Gold medal – first place	1995 Havana	Team
Silver medal – second place	1997 Barcelona	Team
Central American and Caribbean Games
Gold medal – first place	1998 Maracaibo	Team

José Ariel Contreras Camejo (born December 6, 1971) is a Cuban former professional baseball pitcher, who played in the Cuban National Series (CNS), Major League Baseball (MLB), and internationally for the Cuban national baseball team. He also played in the Chinese Professional Baseball League (CPBL) for the Chinatrust Brothers.

Contreras played for Pinar del Río Vegueros of the CNS, and competed for the Cuban national team in the Summer Olympics, the Pan American Games, the Baseball World Cup, and the 1999 exhibition series against the Baltimore Orioles. Recognized as the best Cuban baseball player, Contreras defected from Cuba in 2002.

Contreras signed with the New York Yankees of MLB after defecting, and played for them in 2003 and 2004. He also played in MLB for the Chicago White Sox (2004–2009), Colorado Rockies (2009), Philadelphia Phillies (2010–2012), and Pittsburgh Pirates (2013).

== Cuban career ==
In addition to his time with the Cuban national team, Contreras pitched for the Pinar del Río Vegueros of Cuba's Cuban National Series. In his last season in Cuba (2001–2002), he went 13–4 with a 1.76 ERA and 149 strikeouts. Contreras was named Cuban Athlete of the Year on three separate occasions.

In March 1999, Contreras pitched for the Cuban national baseball team against the Baltimore Orioles in an exhibition series at Estadio Latinoamericano in Havana. Contreras pitched eight shutout innings and struck out ten. It was then that Major League scouts took notice of the Cuban pitcher.

"After the Orioles game, [Contreras] was the man in Cuba," said Joe Kehoskie, at the time an agent for Cuban defectors.

== Defection ==
Contreras defected from Cuba in October 2002 while pitching for the Cuban national team during the Americas Series in Saltillo, Coahuila, Mexico.

Contreras's defection set off a media frenzy, as he had been considered a loyalist and had shown no prior interest in leaving for MLB. "He had been the poster boy for Castro's sports for some time," said Kehoskie.

Days after his defection, Larry Lucchino, then the president of the Boston Red Sox, said Contreras would be "a number two or number three starter in the big leagues."

== Major League Baseball career ==
=== New York Yankees ===
The Yankees signed Contreras to a four-year, $32 million deal on December 26, 2002.

Contreras went 7–2 and posted a 3.30 ERA in 18 games (nine starts), but he spent two months on the disabled list with a subscapularis strain, had four stops in the minor leagues, and was in and out of the bullpen. As a starter, Contreras was 6–1 with a 2.34 ERA. Out of the bullpen, he was 1–1 with a 7.43 ERA. His best game occurred on September 23 at U.S. Cellular Field, in which he shut out the White Sox for eight innings while striking out nine. Contreras appeared in eight postseason games, pitching 11 innings total, with a 5.73 ERA striking out 17.

The Yankees inserted Contreras into the starting rotation from the start of the 2004 camp, but he was inconsistent. Contreras was optioned to the minor leagues for approximately a month (May 5 through May 21). His best start occurred on June 27, against the New York Mets. He struck out ten batters, but what was more important to him is that for the first time since being in Cuba, Contreras got to pitch in front of his ex-wife, Miriam and daughters, Naylan and Naylenis.

=== Chicago White Sox ===
On July 31, 2004, Contreras was traded to the White Sox for pitcher Esteban Loaiza. Contreras pitched inconsistently for the White Sox, up until the end of the season. On the last day of the season, he threw eight innings of two-hit baseball against the Kansas City Royals, earning his 13th win of the season. He finished with a 13–9 record, a 5.50 ERA, and 150 strikeouts in 170 1/3 innings between New York and Chicago.

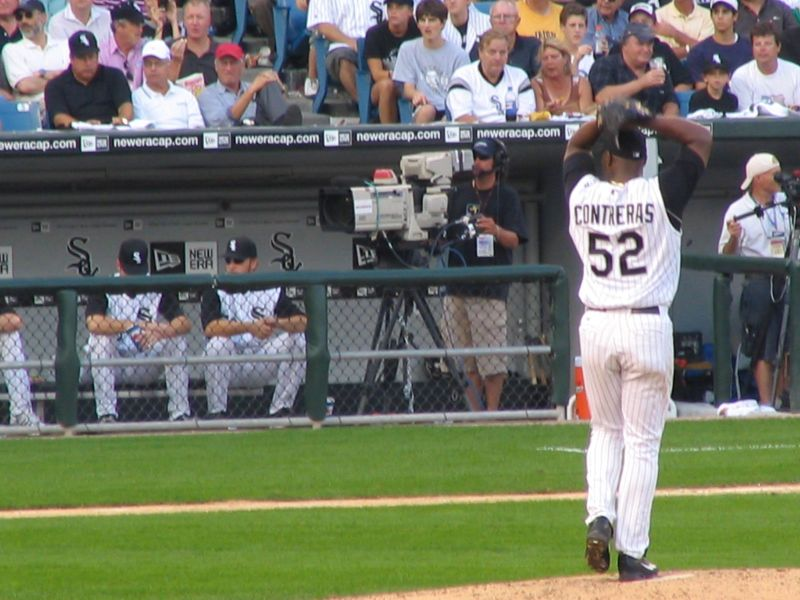
Contreras pitching in the playoffs in 2005

The 2005 season began with mixed results for Contreras. Contreras started the season with five consecutive no-decisions and an ERA of 3.04, but pitched poorly after that until the All-Star break, with a 4–3 record. The first game after the break (July 14), Contreras pitched extremely well, beating the Indians 1–0. Contreras won his last eight starts. With the help of fellow Cuban Orlando Hernández, Contreras began dropping his arm angle during his delivery. Contreras also contributed the three postseason victories that tied Andy Pettitte for the most second half victories in the Major Leagues with 11, and he threw his first Major League complete game against the Minnesota Twins, on September 23. Contreras finished the season 15–7 with a 3.61 ERA in 32 starts, along with 154 strikeouts in 204 2/3 innings.

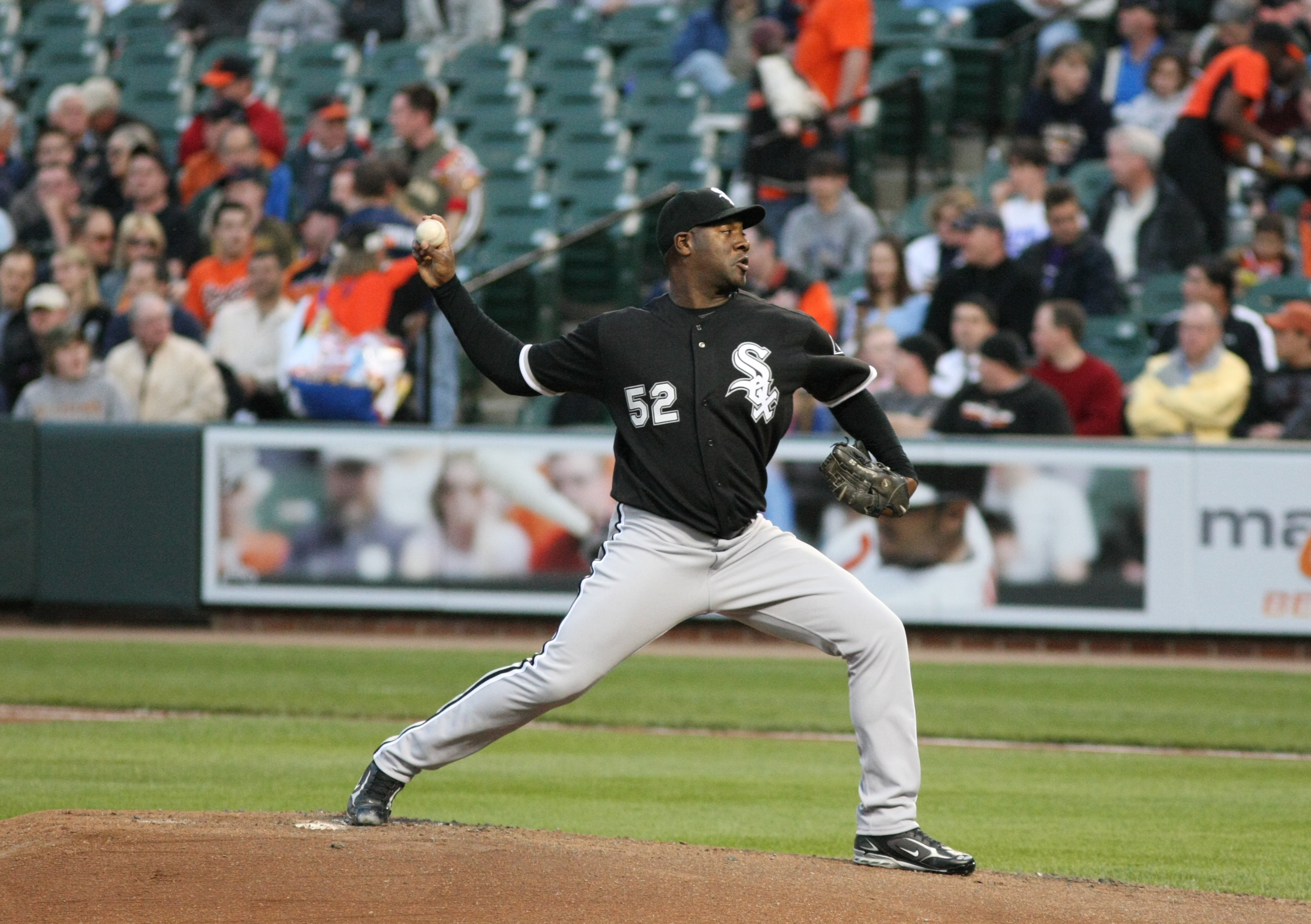
Contreras pitching for the White Sox in 2008

Contreras started Game 1 of every series during the playoffs, winning two out of his three Game 1 starts. The one he lost was to the Los Angeles Angels, which allowed Contreras to earn the win in the pennant clinching Game 5, the fourth consecutive complete game for White Sox starting pitching. Contreras went 3–1 with a 3.09 ERA, 14 strikeouts, and only two walks in four starts during the postseason. During Game 1 of the 2005 World Series, television commentators said that Contreras, who started the game for the White Sox, had his name banned from being mentioned in Cuba by order of President Fidel Castro. White Sox games were also banned from Cuban television and could be seen only with illegal television satellites. The White Sox won the World Series in four games, sweeping the Houston Astros.

The 2006 season began with Contreras inking a three-year, $29 million contract extension with the White Sox. Through July 6, 2006, he was 9–0, with a 3.31 ERA and 71 strikeouts. On June 23, in a 7–4 win over the Astros, Contreras pitched 6 1/3 innings and allowed four earned runs to earn the win, breaking the White Sox team record with his 16th consecutive regular-season win, previously held by LaMarr Hoyt (1983–84) and Wilson Álvarez (1993–94). Dating back to the 2005 season, Contreras won 17 consecutive games before finally taking the loss against his former team, the New York Yankees on July 14, 2006. Contreras was named by his White Sox manager Ozzie Guillén to the 2006 American League All-Star team, but was unable to play because he had thrown six innings and 117 pitches in a start just two days before the All-Star game. Guillen, the AL manager, replaced him with Minnesota Twins rookie Francisco Liriano. This enabled Contreras to become the first pitcher in 30 years to start two consecutive regularly scheduled games.

Contreras suffered setback as a case of sciatica put him on the 15-day DL in May. Along with seeing his personal winning streak come to an end, Contreras finished the season with 13–7 with a 4.27 ERA in 30 starts, including a 5.40 ERA after the All-Star break.

Contreras struggled mightily in the 2007 campaign along with the disappointing White Sox team who finished fourth place in the American League Central Division. He posted a 10–17 record with a 5.57 ERA in 32 games (30 starts). One positive note for Contreras were the career-high two shutouts recorded on May 10 against the Minnesota Twins and on September 19 against the Kansas City Royals.

Contreras ruptured his Achilles tendon on August 9, 2008, while attempting to field a ground ball against the Boston Red Sox. The White Sox placed him on the 15-day disabled list, and Contreras ended up missing the rest of the season.

After an 0–5 start to the season, Contreras was sent to bullpen status on May 9, 2009. On May 10, 2009, he was sent to the minors. On May 12, 2009, Contreras cleared waivers and was optioned to Triple-A Charlotte Knights. On June 8, 2009, Contreras was called up after the first game of a doubleheader against the Detroit Tigers to start the second game. Coincidentally, Jeremy Bonderman was also called up after the first game to face Contreras. Contreras threw an outstanding eight innings and only gave up one hit and one walk, with three strikeouts, resulting in his first win. In his second start after a brief stint in the minors Contreras was equally, if not more, dominant than his last appearance. Notching his second consecutive victory, he threw eight innings of shutout baseball once again, giving up two hits and two walks while striking out eight.

=== Colorado Rockies ===
On August 31, 2009, Contreras was traded to the Colorado Rockies with cash for minor league pitcher Brandon Hynick. He became a free agent following the season.

=== Philadelphia Phillies ===
On January 28, 2010, Contreras signed a one-year, $1.5 million deal with the Philadelphia Phillies. He pitched out of the bullpen rather than being a starter as he had for much of his career. He recorded his first career save on May 15 against the Milwaukee Brewers after taking over the closer's role from the injured Brad Lidge. After the 2010 season, Contreras signed a two-year, $5.5 million contract with an option for 2013 to remain with the Phillies. On October 29, 2012, the Phillies declined his 2013 option and he became a free agent. He went 1–0 with a 5.27 ERA with 13.2 innings pitched in 17 games after spending most of the season on the disabled list.

=== Pittsburgh Pirates ===
On February 23, 2013, Contreras signed a minor league deal with an invite to spring training. His contract was selected to the major league roster on May 3. He was released on June 13, 2013. Contreras was re-signed on June 17, 2013, but was later released again on July 18, 2013.

=== Boston Red Sox ===
On July 19, 2013, the Boston Red Sox signed Contreras to a minor league contract. He was released on August 19.

=== Texas Rangers ===
On December 5, 2013, Contreras signed a minor league contract with the Texas Rangers. The team granted the pitcher his release on March 22, 2014, when the club informed Contreras that he would not make the Opening Day roster.

=== Toros de Tijuana ===
On April 1, 2014, Contreras signed with the Toros de Tijuana of the Mexican League. In 2014, he made 23 starts across 134 innings going 10–3 with a 3.49 ERA and 140 strikeouts. He was released on April 2, 2015. In nine starts and 53 2/3 innings, he went 2–3 with a 3.35 ERA and 52 strikeouts.

=== Chinatrust Brothers ===
On July 5, 2015, Contreras signed with the Chinatrust Brothers of the Chinese Professional Baseball League. and won the MVP of July 2015. He only made seven starts with the Brothers and was 4–1 with a 3.45 ERA. He last pitched on August 30, 2015, and was assigned to be a visiting pitching coach the next day in order to make room for Víctor Gárate to meet the limit for foreign pitchers on the team. Having the desire to pitch, he declined the offer to be a pitching coach for the next year.

=== Tigres de Quintana Roo ===
On March 28, 2016, Contreras signed with the Tigres de Quintana Roo of the Mexican Baseball League. He was released on May 25. In 10 starts and 57 innings, he went 3–4 with a 3.79 ERA and 55 strikeouts.

== Personal life ==
José is the father of Joseph, a pitcher who played in the 2026 World Baseball Classic for Brazil.

== See also ==
- List of baseball players who defected from Cuba
- List of baseball players who are Olympic gold medalists and World Series champions
- List of Major League Baseball players from Cuba
- List of Olympic medalists in baseball
- List of World Series starting pitchers

Awards and achievements
Preceded by Bartolo Colón	American League Pitcher of the Month; September 2005—April 2006	Succeeded by CC Sabathia
