= Nelson Díaz (umpire) =

Cuban baseball umpire

Nelson Díaz Blanco is a Cuban baseball umpire. He officiated in high level international tournaments, including the Summer Olympics, Pan American Games, and Baseball World Cup. Díaz defected from Cuba in 2009.

== Early life ==
Díaz was named for Rocky Nelson. Díaz's father, Placido, was arrested by the Government of Cuba in 1962 for conspiring against Fidel Castro. The family then moved from Havana to Güira de Melena.

== Career ==
A baseball player in his teens, Díaz was not skilled enough to play in the Cuban National Series. During his 20s, he took a 45-day course at Escuela Rafael De La Paz on umpiring.

Díaz served as an umpire in the Cuban National Series for 26 years, becoming its director of umpires. He officiated in several high-profile baseball competitions. His first major tournament was the 1991 Pan American Games. After calling a balk against the United States in a semifinal game against Puerto Rico, Díaz initiated a shoving match with United States manager Ron Polk, which led to increased stature within Cuban baseball. He also officiated in the 1999 and 2007 Pan American Games, the 1999 Baltimore Orioles–Cuba national baseball team exhibition series, the 2001 Baseball World Cup, the 2006 World Baseball Classic (WBC), and the 2008 Summer Olympics.

The Cuban government refused to allow him a visa to visit his mother, who lived in Miami, when she was dying of cancer in 2007. He informed his father, now free and living in the United States, of his intention to defect during the 2008 Olympics; when the Cuban Government found out, they barred him from participating in the 2009 WBC and forced him into retirement. As his father sponsored him in the United States, Diaz defected with his wife and two daughters, with permission from the Cuban Government. He has since umpired youth games in South Florida.

Díaz was honored as the "International Umpire of the World" by the International Baseball Federation in 1994.
