= Yoshinobu Yamamoto =

Japanese baseball player (born 1998)

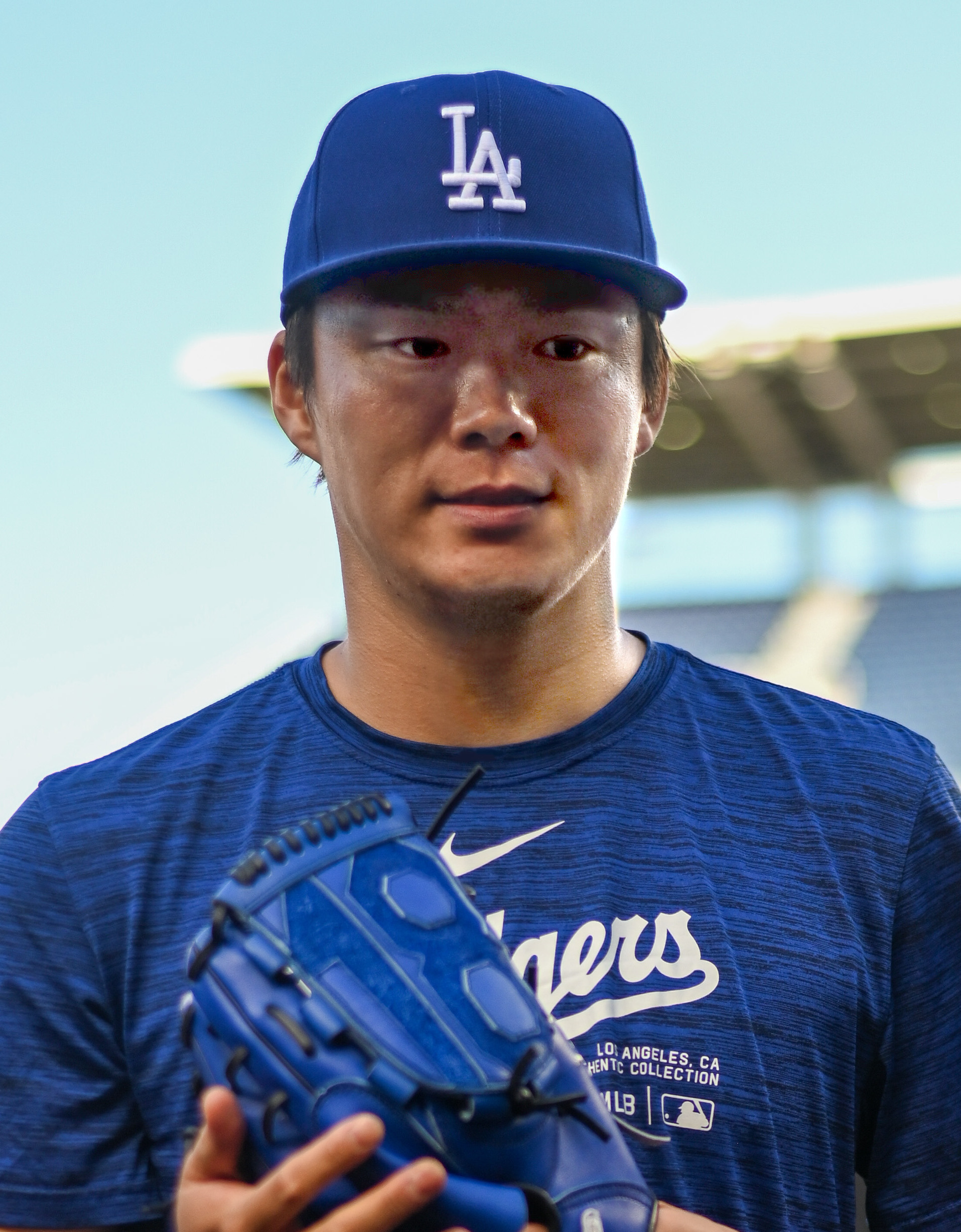
- Yamamoto with the Los Angeles Dodgers in 2024

Los Angeles Dodgers – No. 18
- Pitcher
- Born: August 17, 1998 (age 28); Bizen, Okayama, Japan
- Bats: Right Throws: Right

Professional debut
- NPB: August 20, 2017, for the Orix Buffaloes
- MLB: March 21, 2024, for the Los Angeles Dodgers

NPB statistics (through 2023 season)
- Win–loss record: 70–29
- Earned run average: 1.82
- Strikeouts: 922

MLB statistics (through 2026 season)
- Win–loss record: 33–19
- Earned run average: 2.61
- Strikeouts: 488
- Stats at Baseball Reference

Teams
- Orix Buffaloes (2017–2023); Los Angeles Dodgers (2024–present)

Career highlights and awards
- NPB: 5× NPB All-Star (2018, 2019, 2021–2023); Japan Series champion (2022); 3× Triple Crown (2021–2023); 3× Pacific League MVP (2021–2023); 3× Eiji Sawamura Award (2021–2023); 3× Best Nine Award (2021–2023); 3× Pacific League Golden Glove Award (2021–2023); 3× Best Battery Award with Catcher Kenya Wakatsuki (2021–2023); 4× Pacific League ERA champion (2019, 2021–2023); 3x Pacific League strikeout champion (2021–2023); 3× Pacific League wins champion (2021–2023); Interleague play MVP (2021); Two no-hitters (June 18, 2022, September 9, 2023); MLB: 2× All-Star (2025, 2026); 2× World Series champion (2024, 2025); World Series MVP (2025); All-MLB First Team (2025); International: Tokyo 2020 All-Olympic Baseball Team (2021)
Medals
Men's baseball
Representing Japan
Summer Olympics
| Gold medal – first place | 2020 Tokyo | Team |
World Baseball Classic
| Gold medal – first place | 2023 Miami | Team |
WBSC Premier12
| Gold medal – first place | 2019 Tokyo | Team |

Yoshinobu Yamamoto (山本 由伸, Yamamoto Yoshinobu; born August 17, 1998) is a Japanese professional baseball pitcher for the Los Angeles Dodgers of Major League Baseball (MLB). He has previously played in Nippon Professional Baseball (NPB) for the Orix Buffaloes, where he became one of the most decorated pitchers in league history.

Between 2021 and 2023, Yamamoto won three consecutive Pacific League Most Valuable Player Awards, three Eiji Sawamura Awards, and three Triple Crowns, leading the league in wins, strikeouts, and earned run average in each of those seasons. He also threw two no-hitters and was a key figure in Orix's 2022 Japan Series championship.

Following the 2023 season, Yamamoto was posted to MLB and signed a 12-year, $325 million contract with the Dodgers, the largest ever for a pitcher at the time. In his rookie MLB season, he contributed to Los Angeles’ 2024 World Series title over the New York Yankees, becoming the first player in baseball history to win a World Series, an Olympic gold medal, and a World Baseball Classic title. In 2025, Yamamoto was named to his first All-Star team. He then helped the Dodgers win a second consecutive World Series title over the Toronto Blue Jays and claimed the World Series MVP award in the process, becoming only its second Asian recipient (after Hideki Matsui in 2009). Yamamoto again was named an All-Star in 2026. Internationally, he has represented Japan in multiple tournaments, earning gold medals at the 2019 WBSC Premier12, the 2020 Summer Olympics, and the 2023 World Baseball Classic.

== Personal life ==
Yamamoto was born in Bizen, Okayama, Japan. His given name, Yoshinobu, combines "Yoshi" from his mother's name and "Nobu" from his father's name. He has one sister, who is an English teacher.

== Professional career ==
=== Orix Buffaloes ===
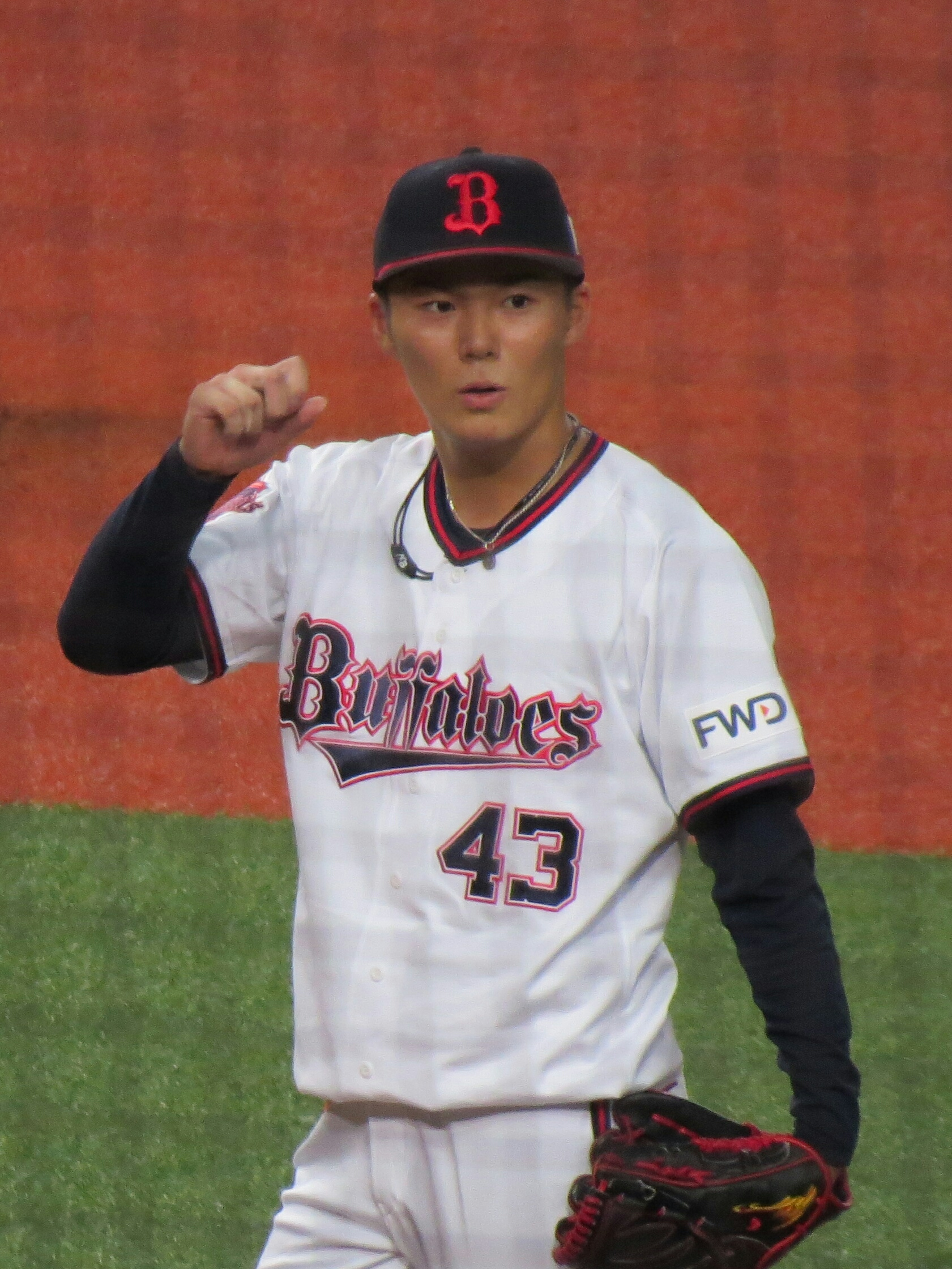
Yamamoto with the Orix Buffaloes in 2019

Yamamoto made his Nippon Professional Baseball (NPB) debut on August 20, 2017, three days after his 19th birthday, for the Orix Buffaloes of the Pacific League. He pitched in eight games for the Buffaloes farm team in the Western League and made five starts for the main club, with a 2.35 ERA.

In 2018, he pitched primarily in relief, appearing in 60 games, with a 2.10 ERA. He also was selected to appear in the Nippon Professional Baseball All-Star Series and finished second in rookie of the year voting. The following season, he returned to the starting rotation, with a 8–7 record, 1.99 ERA and 133 strikeouts in 21 games. In the pandemic shortened 2020 season, he was 8–4 in 18 appearances with a 2.20 ERA.

Yamamoto finished the 2021 season with an 18–5 record and 206 strikeouts across 193 2/3 innings pitched. His 1.39 earned run average (ERA) led the league for the season. Yamamoto won the Pacific League Most Valuable Player Award following the season.

On June 18, 2022, Yamamoto threw the fourth no-hitter in NPB that year, in a 2–0 win over the Saitama Seibu Lions. In 26 starts for Orix in 2022, Yamamoto registered a 15–5 record and 1.68 ERA with 205 strikeouts in 193 innings pitched. Following the season, he was named the Eiji Sawamura Award winner for the second consecutive season. He also won his second consecutive pitching Triple Crown.

On September 9, 2023, Yamamoto threw his second NPB career no-hitter, blanking the Chiba Lotte Marines. He became the first pitcher in NPB history to throw no-hitters in consecutive seasons.

Yamamoto pitched in Game 1 of the 2023 Japan Series when he surrendered seven runs in an 8–0 loss. He followed that up with a Game 6 performance in which he threw 138 pitches for a Japan Series-record 14 strikeouts as the Buffaloes tied the series at three games apiece with a 5–1 win. On November 5, the same day as the Buffaloes' Game 7 and series-deciding defeat at the hands of the Hanshin Tigers, the Buffaloes announced that Yamamoto would be posted to MLB. He was officially posted fifteen days later on November 20.

=== Los Angeles Dodgers ===
The Los Angeles Dodgers signed Yamamoto to a 12-year, $325 million contract on December 27, 2023. The Dodgers also had to pay a $50.625 million posting fee to the Orix Buffaloes.

==== 2024: World Series champion ====
Yamamoto made his major league debut on March 21, 2024, against the San Diego Padres at Gocheok Sky Dome in Seoul, South Korea as part of the MLB World Tour. He allowed five runs on four hits and a walk in only one inning of work with two strikeouts, the first of which was Jurickson Profar. The five runs allowed were the most ever by a Dodgers starter in their major league debut pitching an inning or less. On April 6, against the Chicago Cubs, Yamamoto picked up his first MLB win. He struck out eight while allowing just three hits in five scoreless innings, retiring the last ten batters he faced.

On June 15, Yamamoto started against the Kansas City Royals, but left only two innings into the game with a strained rotator cuff in his right shoulder. He was placed on the 15-day injured list the next day. He was transferred to the 60–day injured list in July 13. Yamamoto was activated off the injured list on September 10. In 18 starts for the Dodgers in 2024, he was 7–2 with a 3.00 ERA and 105 strikeouts. He made his playoff debut on October 5, in Game 1 of the National League Division Series, giving up five runs to the Padres in three innings. In his second start of the series, on October 12, he picked up his first postseason win, striking out two and allowed just two hits in five scoreless innings, retiring the last seven batters he faced, as the Dodgers won the series. He then made one start, in Game 4, in the National League Championship Series, allowing two runs on four hits in 4 1/3 innings, while striking out eight batters. In Game 2 of the 2024 World Series against the New York Yankees, Yamamoto pitched 6 1/3 innings, allowing just one run, a solo home run by Juan Soto, on one hit. The Dodgers won the World Series after 5 games.

==== 2025: Back-to-back titles, World Series MVP ====
Yamamoto started for the Dodgers on opening day in 2025 against the Chicago Cubs in the MLB Tokyo Series. In the game, he pitched five innings, allowing one run on three hits (an RBI double by Miguel Amaya), and struck out four batters to pick up the win. On April 18, in a win against the Texas Rangers, Yamamoto matched his career high of 10 strikeouts in 7 innings. Yamamoto was named the National League Pitcher of the Month for April, after posting a 1.06 ERA through six starts and struck out 43 batters in 34 innings.

Yamamoto was selected to the 2025 Major League Baseball All-Star Game, his first all-star appearance in MLB. On September 6, in a game against the Baltimore Orioles, Yamamoto was one out away from throwing a no-hitter when, with two outs in the bottom of the ninth inning, Jackson Holliday hit a home run for the Orioles and he was removed from the game. He had 10 strikeouts in the game and made it past the seventh inning for the first time in his MLB career. Yamamoto finished the regular season with a 12–8 record in a career high 30 starts, with a 2.49 ERA and struck out 201 batters, his highest total since 2022 in Japan.

Yamamoto made his first post-season start of 2025 in Game 2 of the Wild Card Series, allowing only two unearned runs in 6 2/3 innings against the Cincinnati Reds, while striking out nine. His next start was in the third game of the NLDS against the Philadelphia Phillies. He struggled in that game, only striking out two while giving up three runs on six hits in four innings. On October 14, in the 2nd game of the NLCS against the Milwaukee Brewers, Yamamoto gave up a first pitch homer to Jackson Chourio before throwing a 111-pitch complete game, his first in the MLB. He was the first pitcher to throw his first complete game in the playoffs since Josh Beckett in 2003. He was also the first Dodgers pitcher to throw a complete game in the playoffs since José Lima in the 2004 NLDS and first since Justin Verlander in the 2017 ALCS for any team. He allowed only one run on three hits while striking out seven in the game.

In Game 2 of the 2025 World Series against the Toronto Blue Jays, Yamamoto again threw a complete game, striking out eight while allowing only one run on four hits. He became the first pitcher to throw multiple complete games in the same postseason since Madison Bumgarner in 2014, the first to do it in back-to-back games since Curt Schilling in 2001 and the first Dodger to do so since Orel Hershiser in 1988. He started again in Game 6, pitching six innings, striking out six, and allowing one run on five hits for his second win of the series. One day later, he came out of the bullpen to pitch 2 2/3 scoreless innings to close out the Dodgers' World Series victory in 11 innings. He was named the World Series MVP for his performance, which included three wins, a 1.02 ERA, and 15 strikeouts. Yamamoto was the first pitcher to get three road wins in a World Series, the first to be credited with three wins in a World Series since Randy Johnson in 2001, and the fourth pitcher ever to win Games 6 and 7 (the only one along with Johnson to do so on zero rest.)

Yamamoto was named a finalist for the 2025 NL Cy Young Award, finishing third in the voting. In addition, Yamamoto was named to the All-MLB First Team as one of the starting pitchers.

==== 2026 ====
Yamamoto was again assigned as the Dodgers' starting pitcher for opening day, earning a win against the Arizona Diamondbacks in six innings by allowing only two runs and striking out six. On June 13, Yamamoto took a perfect game through 7 2/3 innings against the Chicago White Sox until an error by Mookie Betts demoted the bid to a no-hitter. The no-hitter went through eight innings until a leadoff home run by Tristan Peters in the ninth inning ended the bid.

On July 4, Yamamoto was selected for his second consecutive All-Star Game appearance. That same day, he would match his career–high of 10 strikeouts against the San Diego Padres, leaving them scoreless through seven innings. On July 19 in Game 1 of a doubleheader against the New York Yankees, he pitched his first MLB regular season complete game, allowing four hits and two earned runs while striking out seven batters. Yamamoto made 28 starts for the Dodgers in 2026, with a 14–9 record, 2.53 ERA and 182 strikeouts.

In the Division Series against the Atlanta Braves, he struck out 10 in seven innings while allowing only one run on four hits. However, in his next start, on October 12, against the Milwaukee Brewers in the NLCS, he only pitched 2 2/3 innings. The Brewers scored three runs on four hits and two walks and Yamamoto only struck out one batter, in the shortest postseason start of his career.

== International career ==
Yamamoto has represented Japan in international tournaments, including the 2019 WBSC Premier12, the 2020 Summer Olympics, and the 2023 World Baseball Classic (WBC). He pitched five times out of the bullpen in the 2019 Premier12, which Japan won. In the Olympics, Yamamoto pitched in two games, allowing two runs and striking out 18 batters in 11 2/3 innings as Japan won gold in Tokyo. Yamamoto was named to the All-Olympic Baseball Team.

Yamamoto pitched in two games, starting one, in the 2023 WBC. He allowed two runs in 7 1/3 innings. Japan again won gold.

== Pitching style ==
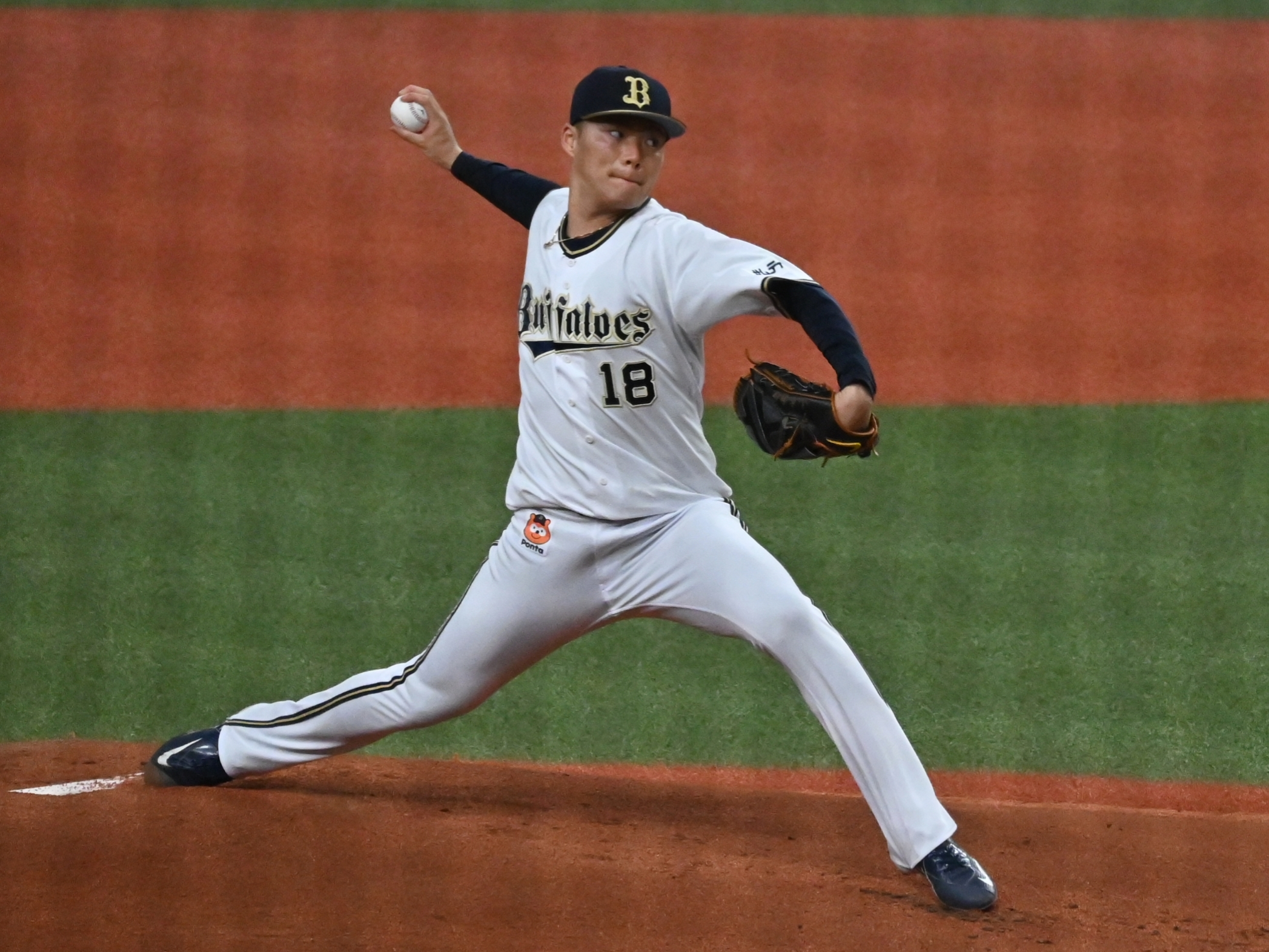
Yamamoto delivers a pitch for the Orix Buffaloes in 2022

Yamamoto is a 5-foot-10-inch (1.78 m), 176-pound (80 kg) right-handed pitcher. With a three-quarters delivery, he throws a fastball averaging 95 mph (153 km/h), which tops out at 99 mph (159 km/h), a deceptive splitter, a cutter, and a curveball. Prior to playing in MLB, scouts said that his splitter would be a legitimate out-pitch. He also has great command, allowing 2.1 walks per 9 innings in his NPB career and 2.2 walks per 9 innings in his first MLB season.

== See also ==
- List of baseball players who are Olympic gold medalists and World Series champions
- List of Major League Baseball players from Japan
- List of Nippon Professional Baseball earned run average champions
- List of Nippon Professional Baseball no-hitters
- List of World Series starting pitchers
- Los Angeles Dodgers award winners and league leaders

Awards and achievements
| Preceded by Tyler Glasnow | Los Angeles Dodgers Opening Day; Starting pitcher 2025, 2026 | Most recent |
| Preceded by Nick Martinez; Freddy Peralta | National League Pitcher of the Month; April 2025; September 2025 | Succeeded by Robbie Ray; Shohei Ohtani |
