= Darryn Smith =

South African baseball player

- Pitcher
- Born: 2 August 1975 (age 50); Durban, South Africa
- Bats: Right Throws: Right

Darryn Smith (born 2 August 1975) is a South African baseball pitcher. Smith competed for South Africa at the 2000 Summer Olympics, where he appeared in one game as the pitcher, giving up three runs in three innings against South Korea. Smith also pitched for South Africa at the 2006 and 2009 World Baseball Classic.

He competed at the Africa/Europe 2020 Olympic Qualification tournament in Italy in September 2019.
