= Jesse Garcia (baseball) =

American baseball player (born 1973)

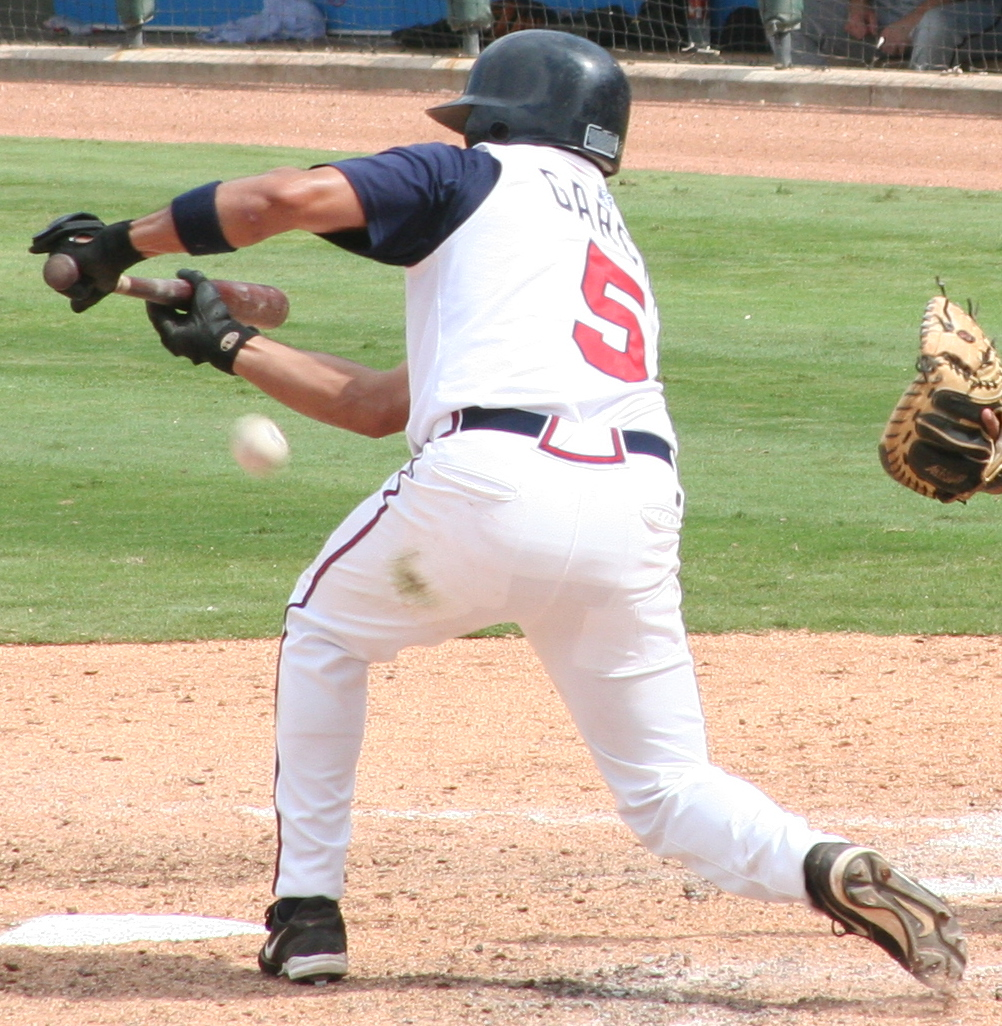
- Garcia with the Round Rock Express in 2006
- Shortstop / Second baseman
- Born: September 24, 1973 (age 53); Corpus Christi, Texas, U.S.
- Batted: Right Threw: Right

MLB debut
- April 5, 1999, for the Baltimore Orioles

Last MLB appearance
- May 8, 2005, for the San Diego Padres

MLB statistics
- Batting average: .216
- Home runs: 5
- Runs batted in: 23
- Stats at Baseball Reference

Teams
- Baltimore Orioles (1999–2000); Atlanta Braves (2001–2004); San Diego Padres (2005)

Jesus Jesse Garcia (born September 24, 1973) is an American former professional baseball infielder, who played primarily at shortstop and second baseman. He played in Major League Baseball (MLB) for the Baltimore Orioles, Atlanta Braves, and San Diego Padres. He bats and throws right-handed.

== Career ==
After attending Lee Junior College, Garcia was drafted in the 26th round of the 1993 draft by the Baltimore Orioles. It would be 1999 before Garcia made his major league debut with the Orioles. On December 18, 2000, Garcia was traded to the Atlanta Braves for Steve Sisco. After playing the next four years for the Braves, mostly for their Triple-A affiliate, the Richmond Braves, though he did appear in a single-season career high 50 games for the Braves in 2004. On August 24, 2004, Garcia was released by the Braves and on November 11 he signed with the San Diego Padres. A free agent after the 2005 season, Garcia signed a minor league contract with the Houston Astros.

Garcia did not appear in a major league game during the 2006 and 2007 seasons, playing both seasons for the Astros Triple-A affiliate, the Round Rock Express. The Astros released Garcia during spring training 2008 and he signed a minor league contract with the Chicago Cubs. Garcia was released in early May.
