= Danel Castro =

Cuban baseball player

Medal record

Men's baseball

Representing Cuba

Summer Olympics
Silver medal – second place	2000 Sydney	Team

Baseball World Cup
Gold medal – first place	1998 Rome	Team
Gold medal – first place	2003 Havana	Team

Intercontinental Cup
Silver medal – second place	1997 Barcelona	Team
Silver medal – second place	1999 Sydney	Team

Pan American Games
Gold medal – first place	1999 Winnipeg	Team

Central American and Caribbean Games
Gold medal – first place	1998 Maracaibo	Team

Danel Castro Muñagorri (born July 2, 1976) is a Cuban baseball player. He won a silver medal in the 2000 Summer Olympics playing for Cuba. He also won a gold medal in the 1999 Pan American Games, the 1998 Baseball World Cup, and 2003 Baseball World Cup. In 2022, he surpassed the record for the most hits in Cuban baseball, exceeding 2,400 hits.

He was born on July 2, 1976 in Las Tunas, Cuba.
