= Major League Baseball Australia Academy Program =

The Major League Baseball Australian Academy Program (MLBAAP) is a seven-week baseball development program held on the Gold Coast, Queensland, Australia for prospective Australian baseball players and officials.

The Academy began in 2001 with the backing of the Australian Baseball Federation, Major League Baseball and the Australian Sports Commission, with the aim of improving the quantity and quality of young Australian baseball players. The Academy has included notable MLB coaches such as Rod Carew, Pat Kelly, Graeme Lloyd, David Nilsson, Mark Hutton and Luke Prokopec. MLBAAP has been the catalyst for over 140 professional player signings, boasts 2 Major league players among its alumni (Rich Thompson and Brad Harman) and has seen many more progress through the ranks of the Australia national baseball team.

== Structure ==
The location of the Academy is the Palm Meadows Radisson Hotel resort, which includes a world-class baseball facility. Players are split into four teams (Roos, Wombats, Koalas and Dingos) and the program is set up very much like professional rookie leagues in North America. Academic staff from several Gold Coast state schools and the Gold Coast Institute of TAFE assist with tutoring and supporting the athletes, to ensure their educational requirements are achieved. Teaching staff are chosen on their experience and empathy regarding the difficult combination of balancing elite sport with academic excellence. Education sessions are conducted Monday to Friday, with an expectation that year 11 and 12 athletes set aside at least 2 hours additional time per Saturday and Sunday for private study.

The seven-week program consists of at least one match a day against each other and other touring teams, with a break on Sunday, giving players and officials plenty of match practice. Between 60 and 80 players are given a scholarship from all states and territories of mainland Australia as well as other invitees from countries including Taiwan, Japan, New Zealand, South Africa, Northern Mariana Islands, New Caledonia and Czech Republic.

The current head coach is national team manager Jon Deeble, who is supported by national team coaching staff Phil Dale, Tony Harris, Pat Kelly, Graeme Lloyd and Dave Nilsson. As of 2010, there are 84 Australians playing professionally in North America.

== See also ==
- List of Major League Baseball players from Australia
