= List of Major League Baseball players from Australia =

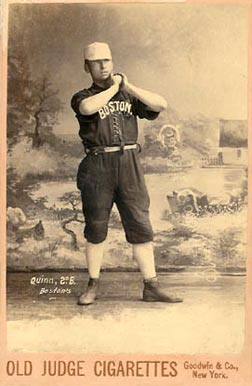
Joe Quinn, the first Australian to play in MLB

Graph showing the number of Australians to have played at least one MLB game in a season since 1986

As of the 2025 Major League Baseball (MLB) season, 38 Australians have played in at least one MLB game. Of those players, 33 were born in Australia, the remainder having been born elsewhere but raised in Australia and have played for the Australia national baseball team at International Baseball Federation or sanctioned tournaments such as the Olympic Games and World Baseball Classic. 25 of the players have been pitchers and the other 13 have been position players.

Australia became the sixth country (not counting the United States) to have a player represented in the major leagues, when Joe Quinn made his debut on 26 April 1884 for the St. Louis Maroons. Quinn also became the first Australian-born manager, as a player-manager for the St. Louis Browns in 1895. After Quinn played his last MLB game, it was almost 85 years before another Australian would appear in an MLB game: Craig Shipley on 22 June 1986 for the Los Angeles Dodgers. The most recent Australian-born player to make his debut in the major leagues is Josh Hendrickson, who played for the Houston Astros on September 23, 2026.

As of 2026, Grant Balfour, David Nilsson, Liam Hendriks and Travis Bazzana are the only Australians to have played in an MLB All-Star Game. In 2013, Balfour was added to the squad by AL manager Jim Leyland as a 'Sunday replacement' pitcher. In 1999, Nilsson was one of two players from the Milwaukee Brewers to be selected. At this time the starting lineup was selected by the fans through voting at stadiums and online. The remaining players were selected by the managers of the respective teams, themselves having been the managers of the league champions from the previous season: in Nilsson's case, he was selected by Bruce Bochy, who had managed the San Diego Padres to the 1998 World Series against the New York Yankees. Liam Hendriks became the third Australian to make the MLB All-Star Game in 2019, as a replacement for Charlie Morton.

Trent Durrington became the only Australian position player to pitch in an MLB game when he appeared for the Milwaukee Brewers on 17 April 2004 against the Houston Astros. Durrington had already entered the game initially as a pinch hitter and remained in the game playing at third base. With two outs in the bottom of the eighth inning, Durrington faced one hitter and induced a fly ball out.

== Players ==
Key
1B	First baseman
2B	Second baseman
3B	Third baseman
C	Catcher
DH	Designated hitter
IF	Infielder
M	Manager
OF	Outfielder
P	Pitcher
SS	Shortstop
U	Utility
*	Member of Baseball Australia Hall of Fame

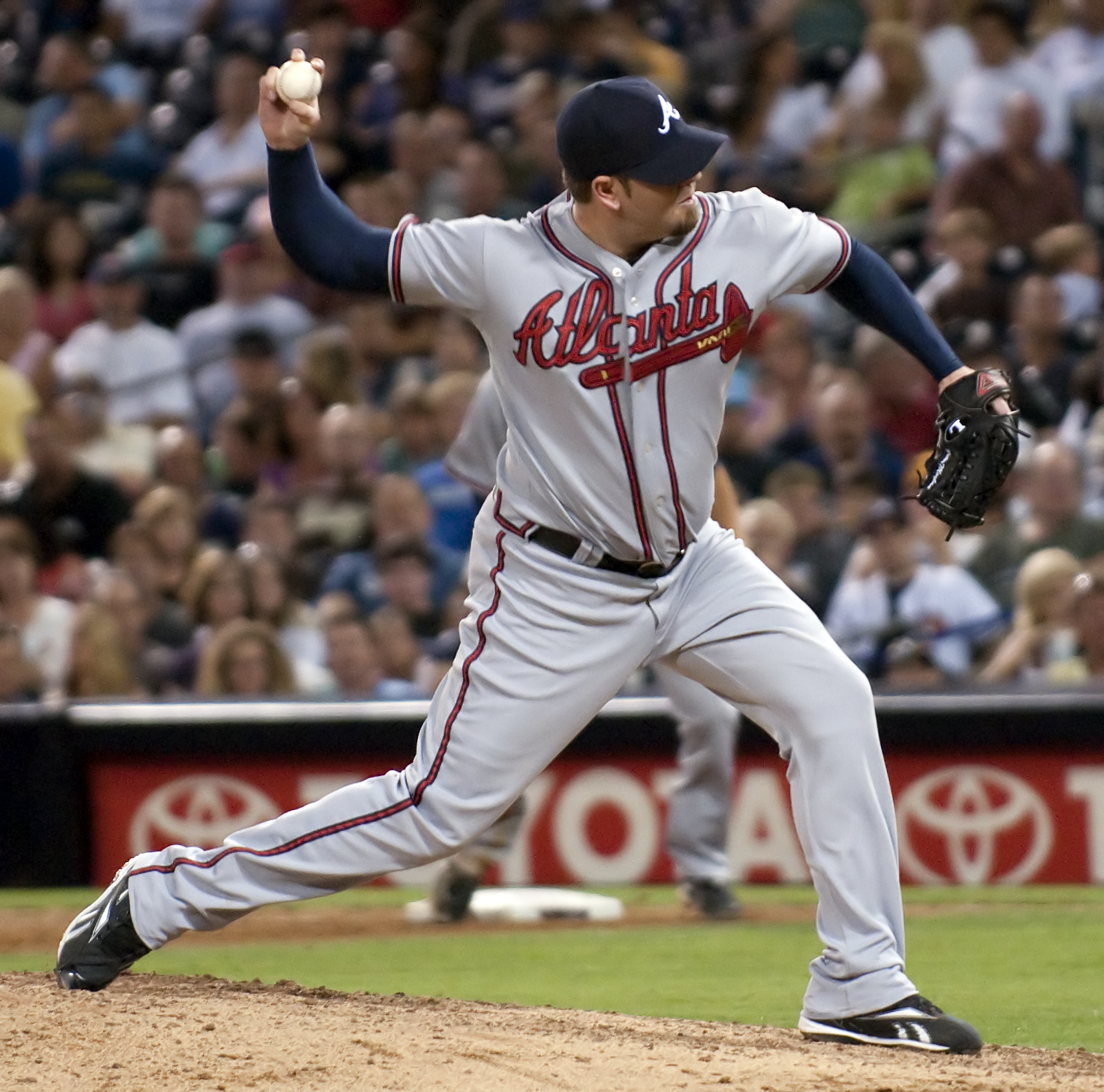
Peter Moylan playing for the Atlanta Braves in San Diego, August 2009

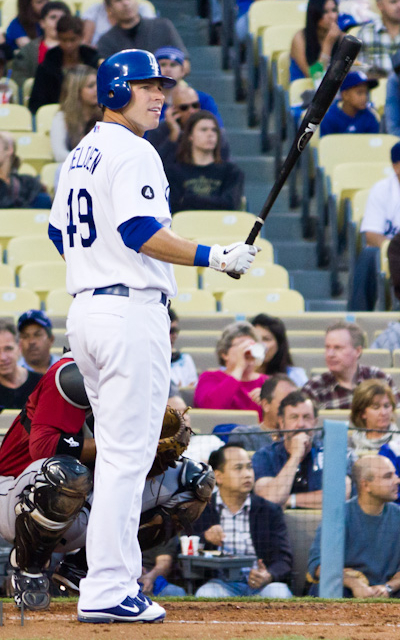
Trent Oeltjen playing for the Los Angeles Dodgers in Los Angeles, June 2011

Australian MLB players
Player	Position	Years	Debut team	Games played	BA	HR	Ref(s)
Grant Balfour*	P	2001-2015	Minnesota Twins	534	-	-	
**Travis Bazzana**	2B	2026-Active	Cleveland Guardians	26	.245	15	
Shayne Bennett*	P	1997-1999	Montreal Expos	83	-	-	
**Brandan Bidois**	P	2026-Active	Pittsburgh Pirates	10	-	-	
Travis Blackley	P	2004-2013	Seattle Mariners	82	-	-	
Cam Cairncross	P	2000	Cleveland Indians	15	-	-	
Trent Durrington	2B / 3B / DH	1999-2005	Anaheim Angels	140	.196	2	
James Beresford	3B	2016	Minnesota Twins	10	.227	0	
Mark Ettles	P	1993	San Diego Padres	14	-	-	
Brad Harman	IF	2008	Philadelphia Phillies	6	.100	0	
**Josh Hendrickson**	P	2026- Active	Houston Astros	1	-	-	
Liam Hendriks	P	2011-2023	Minnesota Twins	490	-	-	
Justin Huber	1B / DH / OF	2005-2009	Kansas City Royals	72	.224	2	
Luke Hughes	IF	2010-2012	Minnesota Twins	106	.218	8	
Mark Hutton	P	1993-1998	New York Yankees	84	-	-	
Shane Lindsay	P	2011	Chicago White Sox	4	-	-	
Graeme Lloyd*	P	1993-2003	Milwaukee Brewers	568	-	-	
**Curtis Mead**	3B	2023-Active	Tampa Bay Rays	240	.244	22	
Damian Moss	P	2001-2004	Atlanta Braves	74	-	-	
Peter Moylan	P	2006-2018	Atlanta Braves	499	-	-	
Micheal Nakamura (Note: Nakamura was born in Japan, but raised in Australia from the age of 3. He competed for Australia at the 1996 Atlanta and 2000 Sydney Olympic Games.)	P	2003-2004	Minnesota Twins	31	-	-	
David Nilsson*	C / 1B / DH / OF	1992-1999	Milwaukee Brewers	837	.284	105	
Trent Oeltjen	OF	2009-2011	Arizona Diamondbacks	99	.220	5	
Jack O'Loughlin	P	2024	Oakland Athletics	4	-	-	
Chris Oxspring	P	2005	San Diego Padres	5	-	-	
Luke Prokopec	P	2000-2002	Los Angeles Dodgers	56	-	-	
Joe Quinn*	U / M (Note: Quinn acted as player-manager for the 1895 St. Louis Browns and the 1899 Cleveland Spiders.)	1884-1901	St. Louis Maroons	1772	.262	30	
Warwick Saupold	P	2016-2018	Detroit Tigers	82	-	-	
Ryan Rowland-Smith	P	2007-2014	Seattle Mariners	121	-	-	
Craig Shipley*	U	1986-1998	Los Angeles Dodgers	582	.271	20	
Chris Snelling (Note: Snelling was born in the United States, but was raised in Australia. He competed for Australia at the 2000 Sydney Olympic Games, 2009 World Baseball Classic and 2009 Baseball World Cup.)	OF	2002-2008	Seattle Mariners	93	.244	7	
Josh Spence	P	2011-2012	San Diego Padres	51	-	-	
John Stephens	P	2002	Baltimore Orioles	12	-	-	
Phil Stockman (Note: Stockman was born in England, but was raised in Australia. He competed for Australia at the 2004 Athens Olympic Games and 2006 World Baseball Classic.)	P	2006-2008	Atlanta Braves	10	-	-	
Brad Thomas	P	2001-2011	Minnesota Twins	72	-	-	
Rich Thompson	P	2007-2012	Los Angeles Angels of Anaheim	82	-	-	
Lewis Thorpe	P	2019-2021	Minnesota Twins	24	-	-	
Alexander Wells	P	2021-2022	Baltimore Orioles	13	-	-	
Aaron Whitefield	OF	2020-2022	Minnesota Twins	8	.000	0	
Glenn Williams	3B	2005	Minnesota Twins	13	.425	0	
Jeff Williams	P	1999-2002	Los Angeles Dodgers	37	-	-	

Bold indicates an active player in the 2026 Major League Baseball season. BA = Batting Average, HR = Home Runs

== Postseason appearances ==
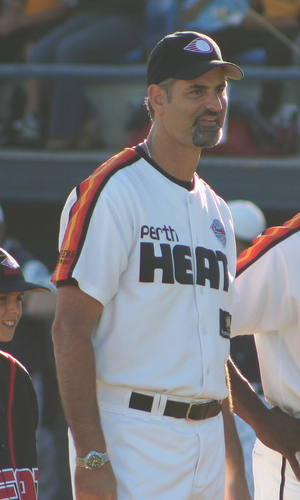
Graeme Lloyd, the first Australian to appear in a World Series

Joe Quinn became the first Australian to make an appearance in a postseason game for a major-league team, when the Boston Beaneaters met the Cleveland Spiders in October 1892 in a best-of-nine series between the season's first-half and second-half leaders (the series has retroactively been referred to as the 1892 World Series). At the time, the National League (NL) was the only active major league, and Boston were already considered to be the NL pennant winners as they had the best record at the end of the season, and the series—won by the Beaneaters 5–0 (with one tie)—was considered an exhibition series.

In the modern era (considered to be from 1901 to today by MLB, as it was the first season with both of the current major leagues in operation), six Australians have played in postseason games, all but one of them pitchers. Graeme Lloyd became the first, playing with the New York Yankees in 1996. He made appearances against the Texas Rangers in the League Division Series, the Baltimore Orioles in the League Championship Series, and the Atlanta Braves in the World Series. Lloyd was credited with the win in Game 4 of the 1996 World Series, becoming the first Australian player to do so, as well as becoming the first Australian to be a World Series champion when the Yankees won in 1996 and again in 1998.

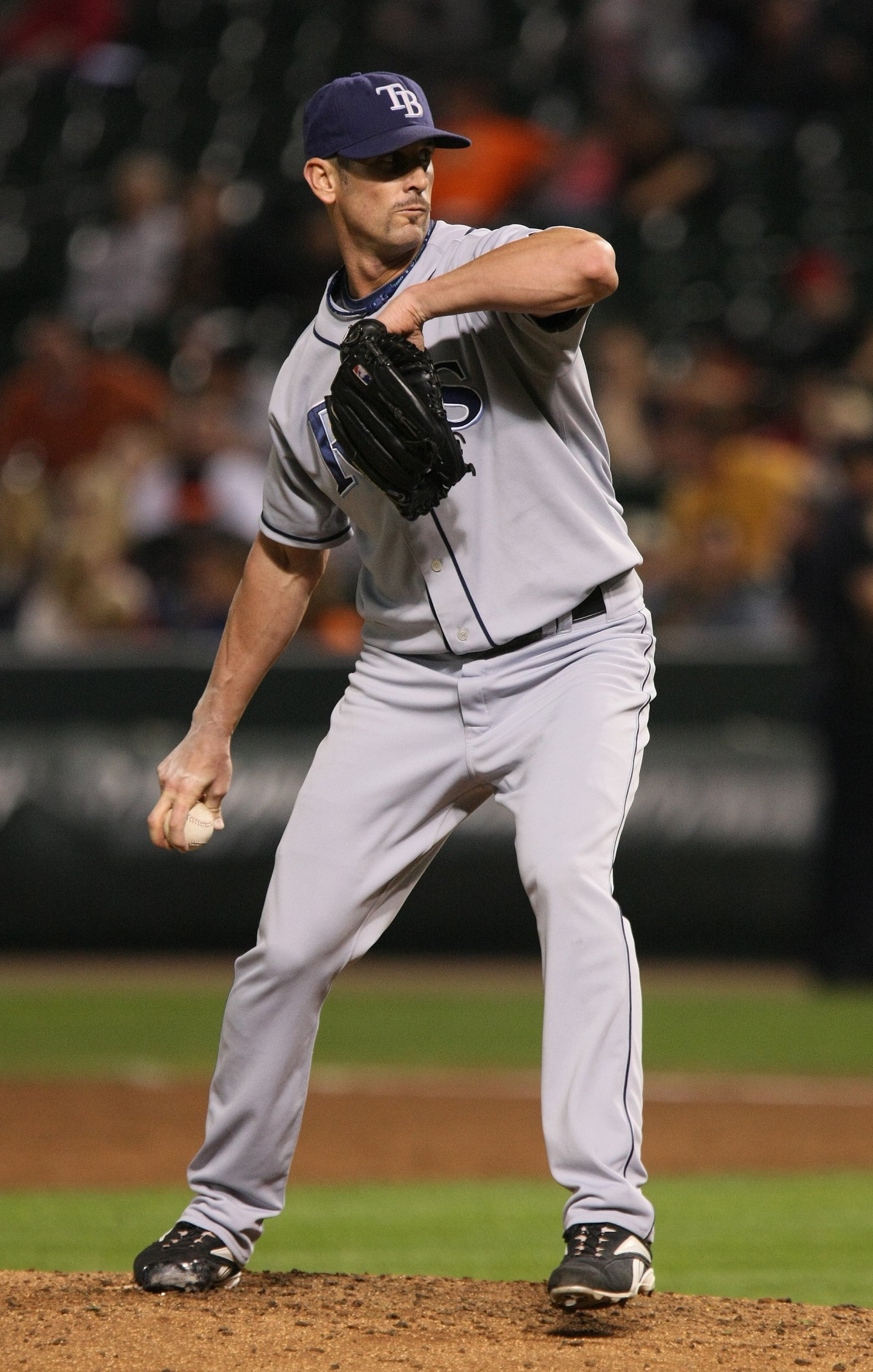
Grant Balfour has the most postseason appearances of any Australian.

Grant Balfour holds the record for most appearances in postseason games for an Australian, having played in a total of seventeen games, thirteen with the Tampa Bay Rays, two with the Minnesota Twins and two with the Oakland Athletics. Damian Moss and Peter Moylan also made postseason appearances, both having played for the Atlanta Braves against the San Francisco Giants: Moss in the 2002 National League Division Series, and Moylan in the 2010 National League Division Series. Liam Hendriks is the most recent Australian to play in the postseason, and the only such player to start a postseason game, pitching in the 2018 American League Wild Card Game for the Oakland Athletics.

Australian players in MLB postseason games
Player	Seasons	World Series			LCS			LDS			WC			Ref(s)
Player	Seasons	Series won	Series played	Games played	Series won	Series played	Games played	Series won	Series played	Games played	Series won	Series played	Games played	Ref(s)
Grant Balfour	2004 Minnesota Twins; 2008 Tampa Bay Rays; 2010 Tampa Bay Rays; 2012 Oakland Athletics; 2013 Oakland Athletics	0	1	3	1	1	4	1	5	13	—			
Liam Hendriks	2018 Oakland Athletics; 2019 Oakland Athletics; 2020 Oakland Athletics	—			—			0	1	4	1	3	5	
Graeme Lloyd	1996 New York Yankees; 1997 New York Yankees; 1998 New York Yankees	2	2	5	2	2	3	2	3	5	—			
Damian Moss	2002 Atlanta Braves	—			—			0	1	2	—			
Peter Moylan	2010 Atlanta Braves	—			—			0	1	4	—			
Joe Quinn	1892 Boston Beaneaters	—			1	1	6	—			—			

== See also ==
- List of countries with their first Major League Baseball player
- Major League Baseball Australia Academy Program
