= Joe Quinn (second baseman) =

American baseball player (1864–1940)

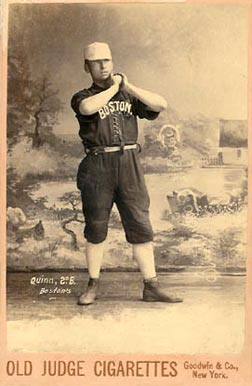
- Quinn in 1888
- Second baseman / Manager
- Born: 24 December 1862; Ipswich, Colony of Queensland
- Died: 12 November 1940 (aged 77); St. Louis, Missouri, U.S.
- Batted: Right Threw: Right

Major league debut
- 26 April, 1884, for the St. Louis Maroons

Last major league appearance
- 23 July, 1901, for the Washington Senators

Major league statistics
- Batting average: .261
- Home runs: 29
- Runs batted in: 794
- Managerial record: 23–132
- Winning %: .148
- Stats at Baseball Reference

Teams
- As player: St. Louis Maroons (1884–1886); Boston Beaneaters (1888–1889); Boston Reds (1890); Boston Beaneaters (1891–1892); St. Louis Browns (1893–1896); Baltimore Orioles (1896–1898); St. Louis Browns (1898); Cleveland Spiders (1899); St. Louis Cardinals (1900); Cincinnati Reds (1900); Washington Senators (1901); As manager: St. Louis Browns (1895); Cleveland Spiders (1899)

Member of the Australian

Baseball Hall of Fame
- Induction: 2013

Joseph James Quinn (25 December 1864 – 12 November 1940) was an Australian-American professional baseball second baseman who played 17 major league seasons. He was the only Australian-born player to reach the major leagues until Craig Shipley in 1986.

== Early life ==
Quinn was born in a squatters' camp outside Ipswich, Queensland, to poor immigrants from Ireland, Patrick Quinn and Catherine, née McAfee. Quinn's father was a swagman and the family traveled Australia so that his father could find work. As a teenager, he moved with his family to rural Iowa. Despite not playing baseball before coming to the United States, he landed his first professional contract after playing only three years of amateur baseball in Dubuque, Iowa.

== Career ==
Quinn started his career in 1884 with the Union Association's St. Louis Maroons, which won the pennant. He was one of few players from that league to later find success in the National League. Throughout his career, Quinn was known for his defensive skills, and he led NL second basemen in fielding percentage twice.

Quinn also had two stints as a big league manager, with the St. Louis Browns in 1895 and the Cleveland Spiders in 1899. His Browns club went 11–28 under his guidance, and the Spiders were even worse, going 12–104. His career .148 winning percentage is one of the lowest in baseball history.

He was, as a player, arguably the best hitter on the Spiders team that he managed, which is considered to have been the worst team in major league history.

He umpired two games; one each in 1894 and 1896.

In the offseason, Quinn was a mortician, and he owned a funeral home after his playing days ended. He died at age 77 in St. Louis, Missouri.

Quinn was inducted into the Baseball Australia Hall of Fame on 4 May 2013.

In 2014, the Australian sports writer Rochelle Llewelyn Nicholls published a biography of Joe "Undertaker" Quinn as Joe Quinn – Among the Rowdies.

== See also ==
- List of Major League Baseball player–managers
- List of St. Louis Cardinals team records
- List of Major League Baseball players from Australia
