= Grant Balfour =

Australian baseball player (born 1977)

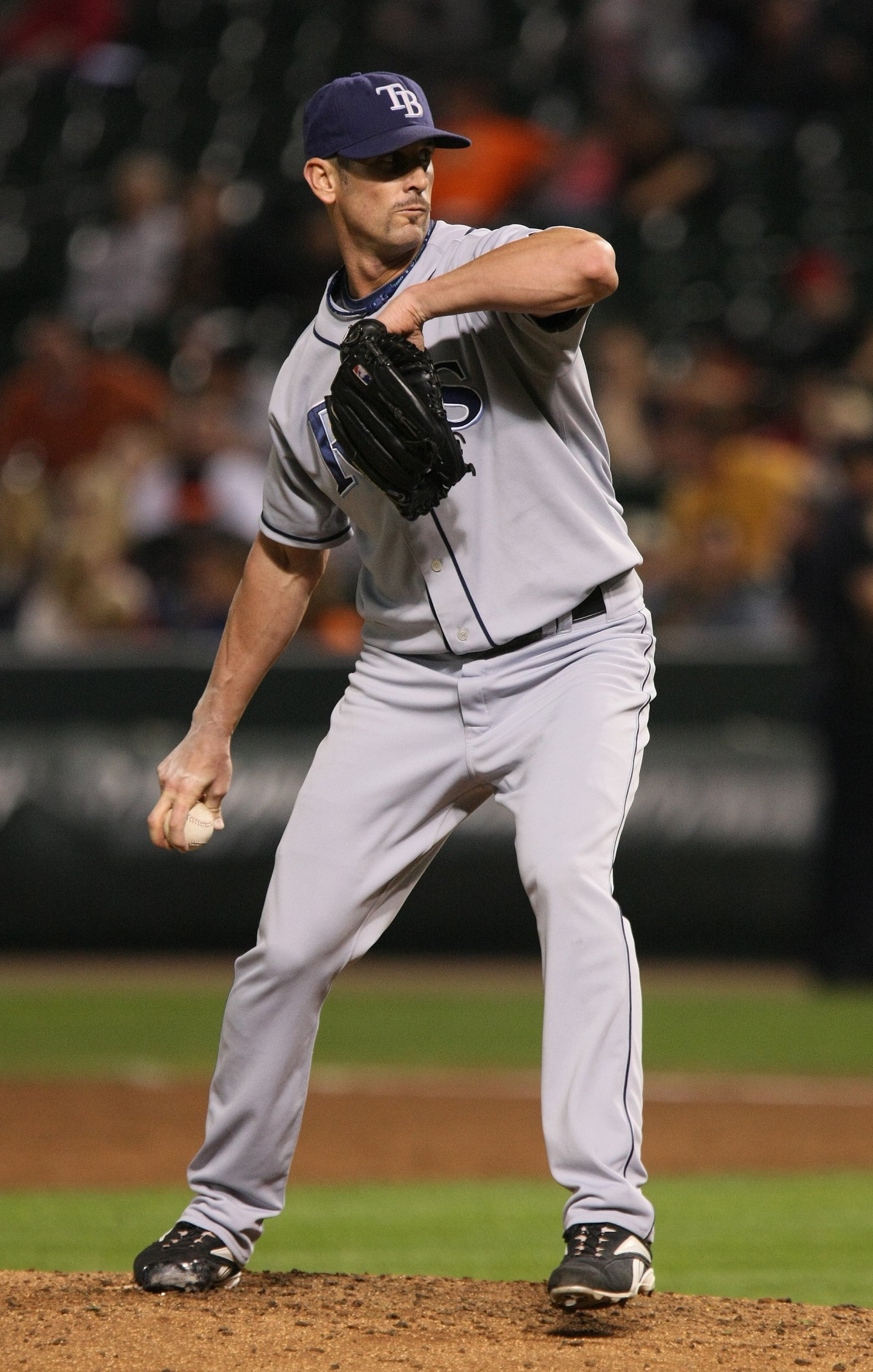
- Balfour with the Tampa Bay Rays in 2008
- Pitcher
- Born: 30 December 1977 (age 48); Sydney, New South Wales, Australia
- Batted: Right Threw: Right

MLB debut
- 22 July, 2001, for the Minnesota Twins

Last MLB appearance
- 18 April, 2015, for the Tampa Bay Rays

MLB statistics
- Win–loss record: 30–23
- Earned run average: 3.49
- Strikeouts: 571
- Saves: 84
- Stats at Baseball Reference

Teams
- Minnesota Twins (2001, 2003–2004); Milwaukee Brewers (2007); Tampa Bay Devil Rays / Rays (2007–2010); Oakland Athletics (2011–2013); Tampa Bay Rays (2014–2015)

Career highlights and awards
- All-Star (2013)

Member of the Australian

Baseball Hall of Fame
- Induction: 2015

Grant Robert Balfour (born 30 December 1977) is an Australian former professional baseball relief pitcher. He played in Major League Baseball (MLB) for the Minnesota Twins, Milwaukee Brewers, Tampa Bay Devil Rays / Rays, and Oakland Athletics. He is second all-time in saves and strikeouts among Australian MLB pitchers behind Liam Hendriks, and holds the Oakland Athletics consecutive save record at 44.

== Background ==
Notable as one of only a handful of Australian-born Major League Baseball players, Balfour spent his first years at school attending Kings Langley Public School and high school years at William Clarke College in Kellyville, New South Wales.

== Baseball career ==
=== Minnesota Twins ===
Balfour made his major league debut with the Minnesota Twins in 2001 and played with them until 2004.

=== Cincinnati Reds ===
After missing 2005 with an injury, he played in the Cincinnati Reds organization in 2006.

=== Milwaukee Brewers ===
After a three-year absence, Balfour made his return to the major leagues on 18 July, 2007, in the 8th inning with the Milwaukee Brewers. He relieved Chris Capuano in a 2–2 tie with the Arizona Diamondbacks, striking out outfielder Chris Young, the first hitter he faced. With two outs in the 8th, he hit a batter and walked another before giving up a three-run home run to Mark Reynolds, giving the Diamondbacks a 5–2 lead. Balfour would finish the 8th and 9th inning and take the loss in relief, having given up three earned runs in the 5–2 defeat.

=== Tampa Bay Rays ===
The Brewers designated Balfour for assignment on 27 July 2007, and traded him to the Tampa Bay Rays that day for Seth McClung. He finished the season in the Rays' bullpen and was re-signed to a one-year deal.

He came into 2008 spring training as a long shot to make the Rays' bullpen. Despite a solid spring training, he eventually lost for on the final spot and was designated for assignment. He cleared waivers and accepted an outright assignment to Triple-A Durham on 3 April 2008.

He was recalled from Durham on 29 May 2008. He earned a save on 31 May against the Chicago White Sox, retiring Brian Anderson to end the game in a Rays 2–0 win. In a series sweep against the Chicago Cubs at Tropicana Field, he was credited with two of the three wins – the first on 16 June, relieving Scott Kazmir with the score 1–1 and bases loaded, pitching 1 1/3 perfect innings in a 3–2 win; the second on 18 June, entering the game trailing 1–2, and pitching 1 2/3 innings, recording three strikeouts, in a game the Rays won 8–3.

He finished 2008 with a 1.54 ERA, a 6–2 record, 4 saves out of 5 opportunities, 14 holds, and 82 strikeouts over 58 1/3 IP in 51 appearances. He helped the Rays win their first divisional title and American League pennant (against the Boston Red Sox), losing to the Phillies in the World Series,

In 2009, he chose to skip the 2009 World Baseball Classic because the Rays asked him not to play for Australia while he was still under contract. That season was much less successful for the Rays, who finished 84–78, 19 games behind the New York Yankees. Although he pitched considerably more innings and games pitched, he finished a disappointing 5–4, with 4 saves and a 4.81 ERA for the season with 69 strikeouts compared to the previous season's 82.

Balfour is known to shout at himself while on the mound and use profanity to fire himself up. On 2 October 2008, during Game 1 of the ALDS, he was involved in an exchange of words with Chicago White Sox shortstop Orlando Cabrera. With the bases loaded and two outs, his first pitch to Cabrera was outside for ball one. Cabrera then kicked the dirt in front of the batter's box in the direction of the pitcher's mound and according to Balfour, Cabrera told him to "throw it over the plate." Unaware of Balfour's behaviour while pitching, Cabrera was under the impression that he was the one being yelled at. The at-bat continued and ended with Cabrera striking out. Balfour stormed off the mound, yelling at Cabrera as he walked to the dugout. Balfour stated after the game that he told Cabrera to "go sit down" and that he "might have mixed one or two words in with it." Deemed a misunderstanding between the two, there were no further incidents in the series, with Balfour getting the final out as the Rays won three games to one.

In December 2009, he signed a new contract with Tampa Bay, worth $2.05 million over one year.

=== Oakland Athletics ===
On 18 January 2011, Balfour signed a 2-year, $8 million contract with the Oakland Athletics. On 20 March 2012, he was named the Athletics' closer over Brian Fuentes. Balfour held the closer role for the early part of the 2012 season but was demoted after a few blown saves to the role of setup man. In early August, Balfour regained the closer role from Ryan Cook. Balfour went 3–2 in 75 appearances with 24 saves in 74 2/3 innings pitched in 2012. On 29 October, the Athletics decided to exercise their option for Balfour worth $4.5M.

On 8 July 2013, Balfour set the record for most consecutive saves for the Athletics, earning his 41st in a 2–1 win over the Pittsburgh Pirates. He was selected later in the month as a replacement All-Star pitcher for teammate Bartolo Colón.

In 65 appearances, Balfour finished the year 38–41 in save opportunities, going 1–3 with a 2.59 ERA as the team's closer, striking out 72 in 62.2 innings with a .206 OBA. He pitched three scoreless innings in the ALDS against the Tigers, getting one win and one save.

In Game 3 of the 2013 ALDS against the Detroit Tigers, Balfour began cursing at Victor Martinez, who then answered back, leading to both benches clearing. Balfour claimed that Martinez gave him a "viral death stare" prior to exchanging words as he composed it on Twitter. The A's would go on to win the game 6-3 but lost the series in 5 games.

=== Second stint with the Tampa Bay Rays ===
On 17 December 2013, it was reported that Balfour had come to an agreement with the Baltimore Orioles on a two-year, $15 million deal. However, on 19 December 2013, it was revealed that the deal was in serious jeopardy as a result of issues that came up during his physical. On 20 December, the Orioles announced that they would not be signing him and that they would look elsewhere for relief help. Balfour responded that he was perfectly healthy and other doctors who examined him disputed the Orioles interpretation of his physical results. He said he would consider filing a grievance with the players association.

Balfour subsequently agreed to a two-year contract with the Rays, worth $12 million. After starting the 2014 season with a 6.46 ERA in 24 games, Balfour was removed from the closer role on 9 June 2014.

He was designated for assignment by the Rays on 18 April 2015, and released on 29 April. Several days after the team released him, Balfour signed a minor league deal back with the Rays. While pitching with Triple-A Durham, Balfour held a 2.79 ERA in eight games, owning an 11:4 K:BB ratio over 9 2/3 innings. He opted out of his contract on 28 May.

On 29 April 2016, Balfour announced his retirement.

== Personal life ==
Balfour's father, David, was a rugby player and general manager and owner of the Sydney Blue Sox. David was diagnosed with pancreatic cancer in 2010 and died on 10 March 2015.

Balfour was inducted into the Baseball Australia Hall of Fame in February 2015.

== See also ==
- Baseball Australia Diamond Awards
- List of Major League Baseball players from Australia
