= Jarryd Dale =

Australian baseball player (born 2000)

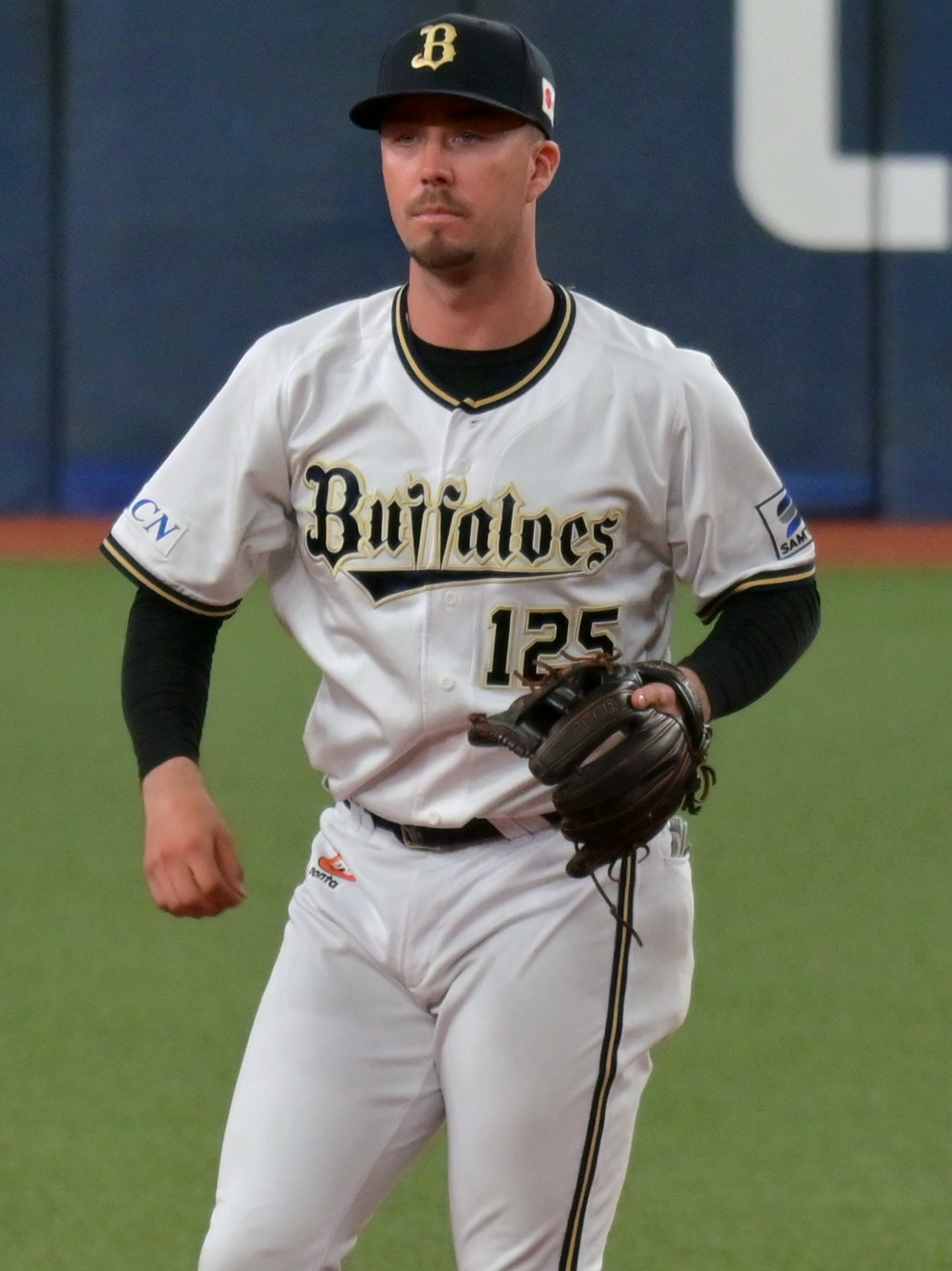
- Dale with the Orix Buffaloes in 2025

Free agent
- Shortstop / Second baseman
- Born: 11 September 2000 (age 26); Melbourne, Australia
- Bats: Right Throws: Right

KBO debut
- March 29, 2026, for the Kia Tigers

KBO statistics (through May 16, 2026)
- Batting average: .256
- Home runs: 1
- Runs batted in: 6
- Stats at Baseball Reference

Teams
- Kia Tigers (2026)

Jarryd James Dale (born 11 September 2000) is an Australian professional baseball shortstop and second baseman who is a free agent. He has previously played in the KBO League for the Kia Tigers.

== Career ==
=== San Diego Padres ===
On 2 July 2017, Dale signed with the San Diego Padres organization as an international free agent. He made his professional debut in 2018 with the rookie-level Arizona League Padres. Dale made 31 appearances for the AZL Padres in 2019, slashing .301/.358/.345 with 16 RBI and six stolen bases. He did not play in a game in 2020 due to the cancellation of the minor league season because of the COVID-19 pandemic.

Dale returned to action in 2021 with the Single-A Lake Elsinore Storm, playing in 102 games and batting .269/.330/.381 with six home runs, 60 RBI, and 31 stolen bases. He split the 2022 campaign between the High-A Fort Wayne TinCaps and Triple-A El Paso Chihuahuas, batting a combined .199/.318/.279 with four home runs, 39 RBI, and 27 stolen bases across 134 total appearances.

In 2023, Dale played in only 24 games split between the rookie-level Arizona Complex League Padres, Fort Wayne, and El Paso, hitting .244/.366/.396 with one home run, seven RBI, and seven stolen bases. He split the 2024 season between Fort Wayne and the Double-A San Antonio Missions, batting a cumulative .171/.225/.288 with three home runs, nine RBI, and two stolen bases. Dale was released by the Padres organization on 4 August 2024.

=== Orix Buffaloes ===
On 16 February 2025, Dale signed a development contract with the Orix Buffaloes of Nippon Professional Baseball. Dale played in 41 games for Orix's farm team, batting .297/.357/.398 with two home runs, 14 RBI, and one stolen base.

=== Kia Tigers ===
On 24 December 2025, Dale signed with the Kia Tigers of the KBO League. Dale recorded a hit in all of his first 15 games, the second longest hitting streak for a foreign hitter in KBO history. Dale was demoted to the minors on 11 May and released on 26 May. In 34 games for the Tigers, Dale slashed .256/.328/.316 with one home run and six RBI. However, he struggled on defense, making nine errors.

== International career ==
Dale played for Team Australia in the 2023 World Baseball Classic. He also represented Australia at the 2024 WBSC Premier12.

== Personal life ==
Dale's father, Philip, played professionally in the Cincinnati Reds organization, later setting several records in the Australian Baseball League (ABL) and winning a silver medal at the Athens 2004 Olympics as a coach for the Australian Olympic baseball team. Dale's brother, Ryan, played professionally in the Kansas City Royals organization. His cousin, Jon Kennedy, played professionally for the Atlanta Braves organization.
