= Geoff Hendriks =

Australian rules footballer

Personal information
- Full name: Geoffrey Francis Hendriks
- Born: 6 February 1959 (age 67)
- Original team: Trinity College
- Height: 185 cm (6 ft 1 in)
- Weight: 84 kg (185 lb)
- Position: Utility

Playing career
Years	Club	Games (Goals)
1975–1985	West Perth	169 (112)

Career highlights
- West Perth premiership team 1975; West Perth life member

Geoffrey Francis "Geoff" Hendriks (born 6 February 1959) is a former Australian rules footballer who played for the West Perth Football Club in the West Australian Football League (WAFL) between 1975 and 1985. He is the youngest premiership player in the competition's history, having won a premiership with the Falcons at the age of 16 in his debut season.

== Biography ==
Hendriks is the son of Dutch immigrants. He attended Trinity College, Perth.

Hendriks made his senior debut for West Perth at the age of 16 years 195 days, at the time making the ninth-youngest player to play a senior WA(N)FL game. He became (and remains) the second-youngest ever West Perth player ever (after Pat Rodriguez), and one of only four to play for the team at the age of 16 (alongside Rodriguez, Les Fong, and Frank Golding). After breaking into the team in the final round of the 1975 season, Hendriks held his place in West Perth's line-up for the second semi-final against Swan Districts. He did enough to win selection for the grand final team, and helped his side to a record-breaking 104-point win against South Fremantle in front of a crowd of 52,322 fans. Hendriks became the first 16-year-old to win a WA(N)FL premiership, and remains the youngest ever. Stephen Coniglio, who won a medal with Swan Districts in 2010, is the only player to come close to this record.

In the early rounds of the 1977 season, Hendriks was pushed into the forward line for the first time by coach Graham Campbell, and responded by kicking 22 goals in five games including nine against Claremont in round six. In the 18 games before that he had never kicked a goal. His form eventually tapered off and he was moved back to other positions, although he did return to the forward line briefly at other times. His next-best haul was six goals against East Fremantle in round five 1978, but other than that he never again kicked more than three goals in a game. According to the WA Football Budget of June 12, 1982, "over the years Hendriks has been used in a variety of positions, including ruck rover or half-forward, but it is clear he is best suited to defence".

By the time of his retirement after the 1985 season, Hendriks had played 169 senior games for West Perth and kicked 112 goals. This included two games in the NFL Night Series in 1977–78 and five in the AFC Night Series in 1979–81, against interstate teams like North Adelaide, Glenelg, South Melbourne, Hawthorn, and North Melbourne. Hendriks and West Perth never played in another grand final after his debut year, but he did play in losing preliminary finals in 1977 and 1982. Several of his seasons were affected by injuries of various types. He was unlucky to miss out on selection for Western Australia – if state of origin rules had not been adopted he probably would've played at least a couple games for the state.

After retiring from football Hendriks became the principal of St Patrick's Catholic School Katanning and later Sacred Heart Thornlie. He is currently Director of Business at Bindoon Agricultural College Bindoon. He has also worked as a WA talent scout for Sydney Swans.

== Family ==
Hendriks is the father of professional baseball player Liam Hendriks of the Chicago White Sox. Liam was a talented footballer and eligible for the West Coast Eagles AFL team under the father–son rule in place at the time, but chose not to pursue football.
