= Jon Kennedy (baseball) =

Australian baseball player (born 1994)

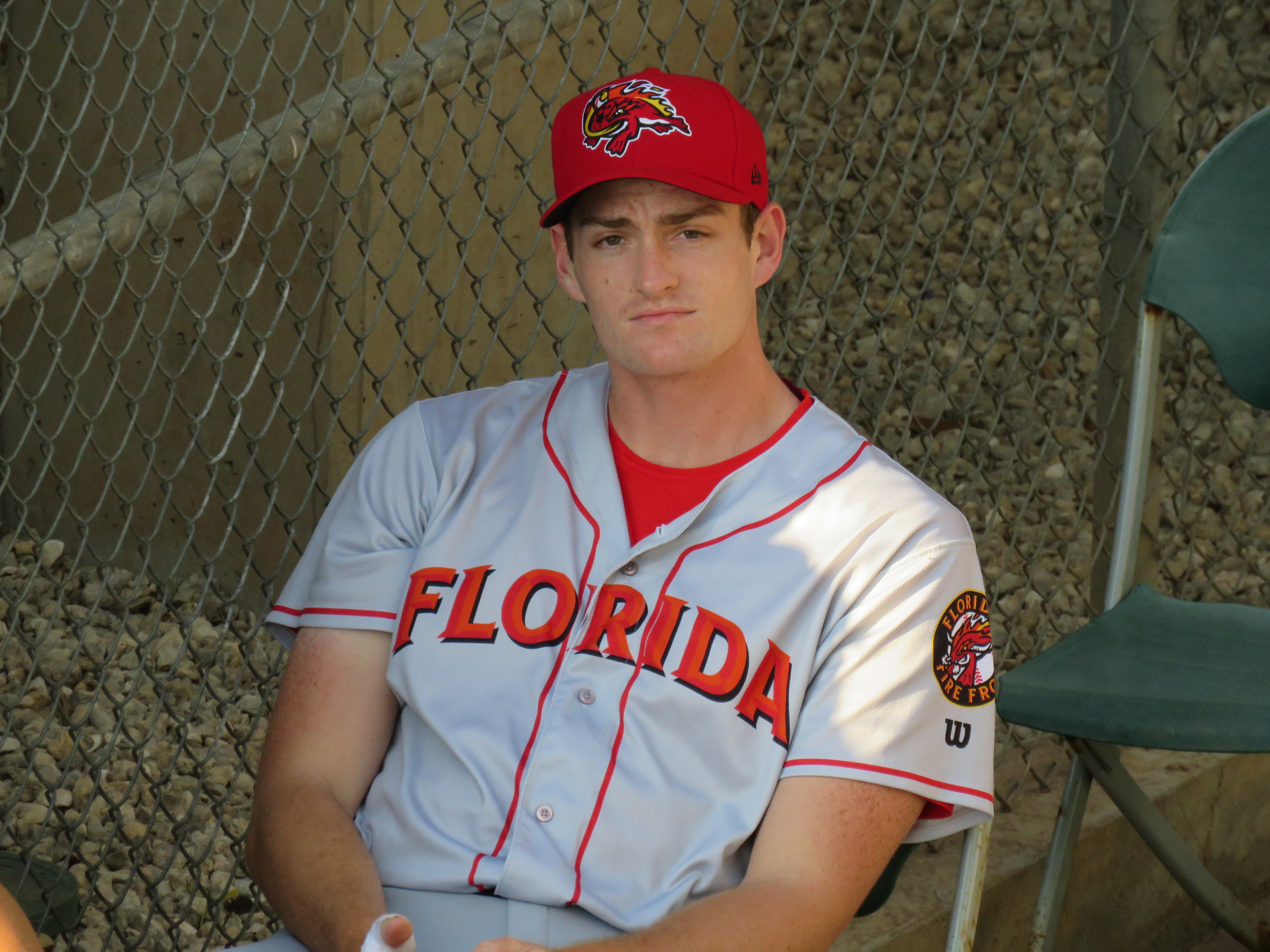
- Kennedy with the Florida Fire Frogs in 2018

LG Twins – No. 68
- Pitcher
- Born: 20 September 1994 (age 31); Melbourne, Victoria, Australia
- Bats: Left Throws: Left
- Stats at Baseball Reference

Teams
- LG Twins (2026-)

Jon Robert Dale Kennedy (born 20 September 1994) is an Australian professional baseball pitcher for the LG Twins of the KBO League.

== Career ==
=== Atlanta Braves ===
Kennedy began his professional career with the Melbourne Aces of the Australian Baseball League and signed with the Atlanta Braves on 4 October 2015. He made his debut with Atlanta's organization in 2016 and split time between the Single–A Rome Braves, rookie–level Danville Braves, and High–A Carolina Mudcats where he posted a combined 2.92 ERA and 1.27 WHIP in 19 total relief appearances between the three teams. He spent 2017 with Rome where he was 5–2 with a 2.87 ERA in 39 games.

In 2018, Kennedy split the season between the High–A Florida Fire Frogs and Triple–A Gwinnett Stripers. In 29 total contests, he accumulated a 5–7 record and 3.26 ERA with 59 strikeouts and 1 save in 66 1/3 innings pitched. He returned to Florida in 2019, and made 7 appearances, where he logged a 4.09 ERA with 12 strikeouts in 11 innings of work. On 24 April 2019, Kennedy was released by the Braves organization.

=== Tochigi Golden Braves ===
On 1 June 2019 he signed with Tochigi Golden Braves of the Baseball Challenge League.

=== Hroši Brno ===
Kennedy played for Hroši Brno of the Extraliga in 2022.

=== LG Twins ===
On August 15, 2026, Kennedy signed with the LG Twins of the Korea Baseball Organization.

== International career ==
He was selected for the Australian national baseball team at the 2017 World Baseball Classic and 2019 WBSC Premier12.

== Personal life ==
Kennedy's uncle is Philip Dale. His cousin, Jarryd Dale, plays for the Kia Tigers of the KBO League.
