= Baseball Australia Hall of Fame =

The Baseball Australia Hall of Fame logo.

The Baseball Australia Hall of Fame or Australian Baseball Federation Hall of Fame is a group of baseball players, managers and coaches who have been recognised by the Australian Baseball Federation (ABF) as having influenced baseball in Australia over a prolonged period of time "at the highest level available at the time."

The concept of an Australian baseball hall of fame was first formally raised in 2002 when the ABF board created a Heritage Committee, who were tasked with creating a hall of fame including the selection criteria and induction process. The first group of inductees was announced in December 2004, and were formally inducted at a presentation ceremony on 27 January 2005. Since 2006, new groups have since been inducted as part of the Baseball Australia Diamond Awards each year.

== Inductees ==
Through 2021, 90 people have been inducted into the hall of fame. Notable inductees include;

Year	No. inductees
2005	41
2006	7
2007	2
2008	4
2009	2
2010	5
2011	2
2012	3
2013	5
2014	3
2015	3
2016	4
2017	3
2018	4
2021	2
Total	90

- Norman Claxton (2005)
- Philip Dale (2005)
- Ronny Johnson (2005)
- Frank Laver (2005)
- Graeme Lloyd (2005)
- Eric McElhone (2005)
- Bob Nilsson (2005)
- Dave Nilsson (2005)
- Neil Page (2005)
- Charlie Puckett (2005)
- James Searle (2005)
- Ron Sharpe (2005)
- Craig Shipley (2005)
- Ross Straw (2005)
- John Swanson (2005)
- Jon Deeble (2006)
- Shayne Bennett (2008)
- Monty Noble (2010)
- Simone Wearne (2012)
- Glenn Williams (2012)
- Joe Quinn (2013)
- Brendan Kingman (2014)
- Trent Durrington (2015)
- Grant Balfour (2015)
- Peter Vogler (2016)
- Micheal Nakamura (2016)
- John Stephens (2017)
- Mark Ettles (2018)
- Justin Huber (2021)

== See also ==
- Australian baseball awards
- Sport Australia Hall of Fame Awards
