= Ronny Johnson =

American-Australian baseball player

- Pitcher / First baseman
- Born: November 8, 1962 (age 63); San Jose, California, U.S.
- Bats: Right Throws: Right

Member of the Australian

Baseball Hall of Fame
- Induction: 2005

Ronny George Johnson (born November 8, 1962) is an American-Australian former professional baseball player and Olympic competitor. Listed at 6 feet 5 inches (1.96 m) and 190 pounds (86 kg) during his professional career, he threw and batted right-handed. He is an inductee of the Baseball Australia Hall of Fame.

== Biography ==
Johnson played high school baseball in Canyon Country, California, as a pitcher and right fielder. In 1981, Johnson played college baseball for Pierce Junior College in Woodland Hills, Los Angeles, where he pitched in 11 games (six starts), recording a 2–5 win–loss record with a 4.05 earned run average (ERA) and one save. He also appeared in 24 games as a designated hitter, accruing a .265 batting average with five home runs and 20 runs batted in (RBIs). He was selected in the second round of the January 1982 winter MLB draft by the Toronto Blue Jays. He signed with the Blue Jays organization in May 1982.

Johnson played in Minor League Baseball from 1982 to 1985, for farm teams of the Blue Jays and Texas Rangers. He pitched in 65 games (27 starts) compiling a 13–15 record with 4.52 ERA while striking out 159 batters in 229 innings pitched. He did not play above the Single-A level.

Johnson subsequently played professional baseball in Australia from 1989 to 1999. He competed for the Australia national baseball team in the 1998 Baseball World Cup, held in Italy. At age 37, Johnson competed at the 2000 Summer Olympics for Australia, appearing in six games as a first baseman, designated hitter, and pinch hitter. During the Olympic baseball tournament, the Australian team compiled a 2–5 record, finishing seventh in the field of eight teams. Johnson was inducted to the Baseball Australia Hall of Fame in 2005.
