= Mark Ettles =

Australian baseball player (born 1966)

- Pitcher
- Born: 30 October 1966 (age 59); Perth, Western Australia
- Batted: Right Threw: Right

MLB debut
- 5 June, 1993, for the San Diego Padres

Last MLB appearance
- 9 July, 1993, for the San Diego Padres

MLB statistics
- Win–loss record: 1–0
- Earned run average: 6.50
- Strikeouts: 9

CPBL statistics
- Win–loss record: 2–0
- Earned run average: 1.57
- Strikeouts: 10
- Stats at Baseball Reference

Teams
- San Diego Padres (1993); Chinatrust Whales (1998)

Member of the Australian

Baseball Hall of Fame
- Induction: 2018

Mark Edward Ettles (born 30 October 1966) is an Australian former baseball pitcher who played for the San Diego Padres in 1993. He was a member of the Australia national baseball team, that ended up in sixth place at the 2000 Summer Olympics in Sydney, Australia.

He attended high school at Wesley College in South Perth.

== See also ==
- List of players from Australia in Major League Baseball

== Sources ==
- Career statistics from Baseball Reference · Baseball Reference (Minors) · Retrosheet · Baseball Almanac
