= Liam Hendriks =

Australian baseball player (born 1989)

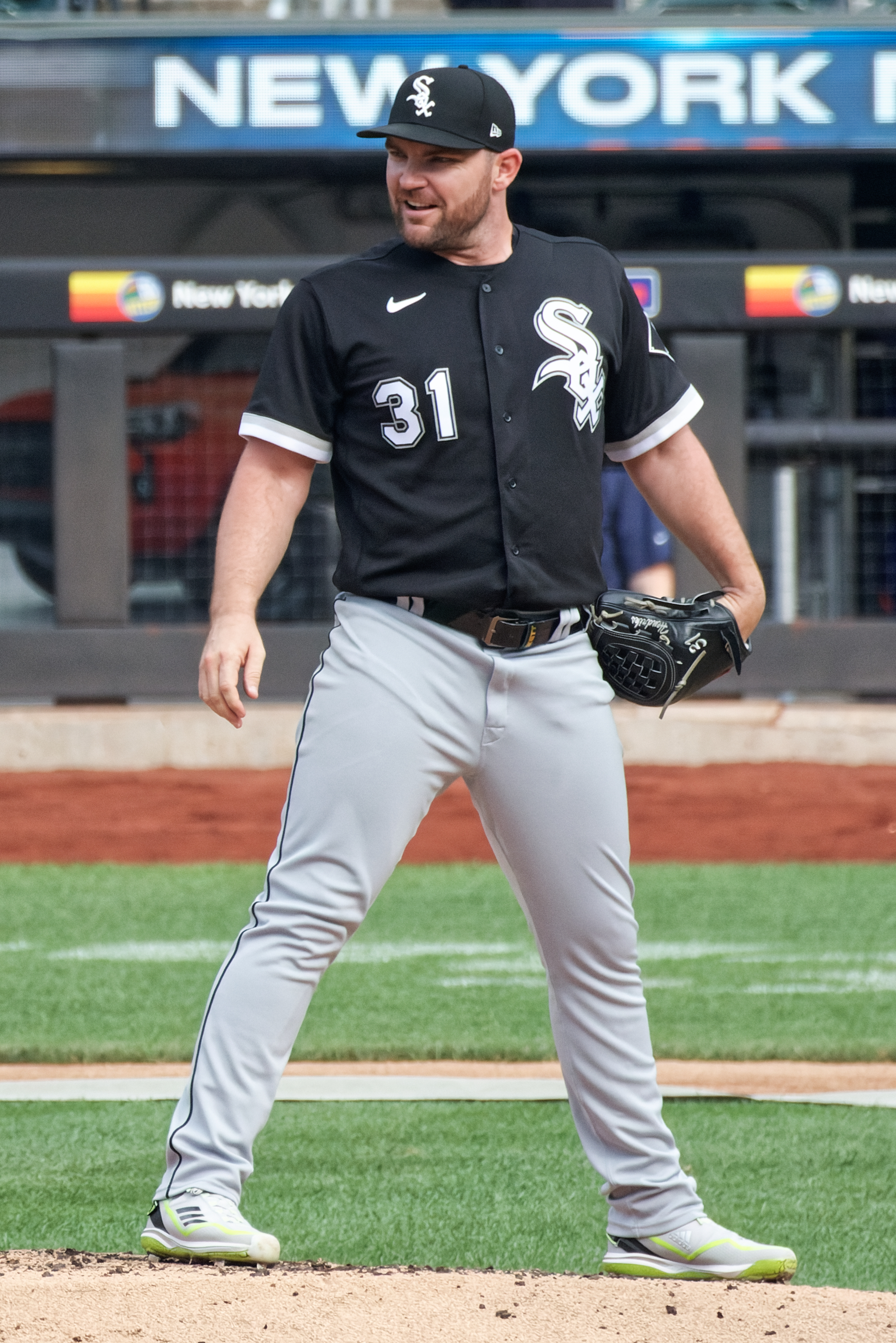
- Hendriks with the White Sox in 2023
- Pitcher
- Born: 10 February 1989 (age 37); Perth, Western Australia, Australia
- Batted: Right Threw: Right

MLB debut
- September 6, 2011, for the Minnesota Twins

Last MLB appearance
- May 27, 2025, for the Boston Red Sox

MLB statistics
- Win–loss record: 33–36
- Earned run average: 3.88
- Strikeouts: 739
- Saves: 116
- Stats at Baseball Reference

Teams
- Minnesota Twins (2011–2013); Toronto Blue Jays (2014); Kansas City Royals (2014); Toronto Blue Jays (2015); Oakland Athletics (2016–2020); Chicago White Sox (2021–2023); Boston Red Sox (2025)

Career highlights and awards
- 3× All-Star (2019, 2021, 2022); 2× All-MLB First Team (2020, 2021); 2× AL Reliever of the Year (2020, 2021); AL Comeback Player of the Year (2023); AL saves leader (2021)

Liam Johnson Hendriks (born 10 February 1989) is an Australian former professional baseball pitcher. He played in Major League Baseball (MLB) for the Minnesota Twins, Kansas City Royals, Toronto Blue Jays, Oakland Athletics, Chicago White Sox, and Boston Red Sox. He was named a All-Star three times (2019, 2021 and 2022) and was the American League's Reliever of the Year in 2020 and 2021. He won the AL MLB Comeback Player of the Year Award for the 2023 season.

== Background ==
Born and raised in Perth, Western Australia, Hendriks began playing tee-ball when he was five (rather than the traditional Australian summer game of cricket), before transitioning to baseball at the age of ten. He also played Australian rules football. Hendriks continued playing both baseball and football through high school at Sacred Heart College, Sorrento.

Hendriks's paternal grandparents emigrated to Australia from the Netherlands. His father, Geoff Hendriks, played over 150 games of senior football for the West Perth Football Club in the West Australian Football League (WAFL). Under the father–son rule used by the Australian Football League (AFL) at the time, Liam was eligible to be drafted by the West Coast Eagles had he decided to pursue a career in football. However, he decided to pursue baseball and was signed by the Minnesota Twins on his eighteenth birthday.

In 2017 and 2019, Hendriks was the Oakland Athletics' nominee for the Roberto Clemente Award after his work with Big League Impact and Striking Out Poverty in their efforts to end poverty in the Dominican Republic.

Hendriks was the Chicago White Sox Roberto Clemente nominee in 2021, 2022, and 2023, making him a five-time nominee. He was nominated again in 2024 and 2025 by the Boston Red Sox, making Hendriks a 7-time nominee. He was honored for his active engagement with cancer survivors, veteran support groups, and patient care initiatives following his own recovery from non-Hodgkin lymphoma.

== Professional career ==
=== Australian Baseball League ===
In 2008, Hendriks pitched for the Perth Heat in their successful Claxton Shield series, going 3–0 with a 1.90 ERA and 25 strikeouts, a competition high. He was named Rookie of the Year for that season. Liam returned for the Heat in the inaugural season of the Australian Baseball League. After starting the season posting seven scoreless innings over three outings, Hendriks endured a rough second half, finishing the season with a 1-4 record and a 6.49 ERA in eight total games.

=== Minnesota Twins ===
Hendriks debuted in the Twins organization in 2007, pitching for the Gulf Coast League Twins. He led the team in strikeouts with 52. He was also named as one of the Twins' top 50 prospects.

Hendriks was added to the Australian national team for the 2008 Final Olympic Qualification Tournament, held in March. He pitched five innings while only allowing one unearned run alongside two hits and a walk while striking out six. Hendriks subsequently underwent back surgery that prevented him from playing in the minors in the 2008 season, but was added to the 2009 World Baseball Classic roster, the youngest Australian player in the Classic.

In 2009, Hendriks spent the season with the Single-A Beloit Snappers of the Midwest League and the Rookie-level Elizabethton Twins of the Appalachian League. He went a combined 5–5 with a 3.55 ERA in 14 games, all starts. Hendriks was selected for the 2010 All-Star Futures Game, but developed appendicitis and was forced to miss the game. On 5 September 2011, Hendriks was called up to the Minnesota Twins from Triple-A Rochester. He went on to finish the season with an 0–2 record. At the end of the 2011 season he was named the Minnesota Twins' Minor League Pitcher of the Year. He was an All-Star for the Double-A New Britain Rock Cats in 2011, and named an organizational All-Star for Minnesota at the end of the season. He also earned his second invitation to the Futures Game.

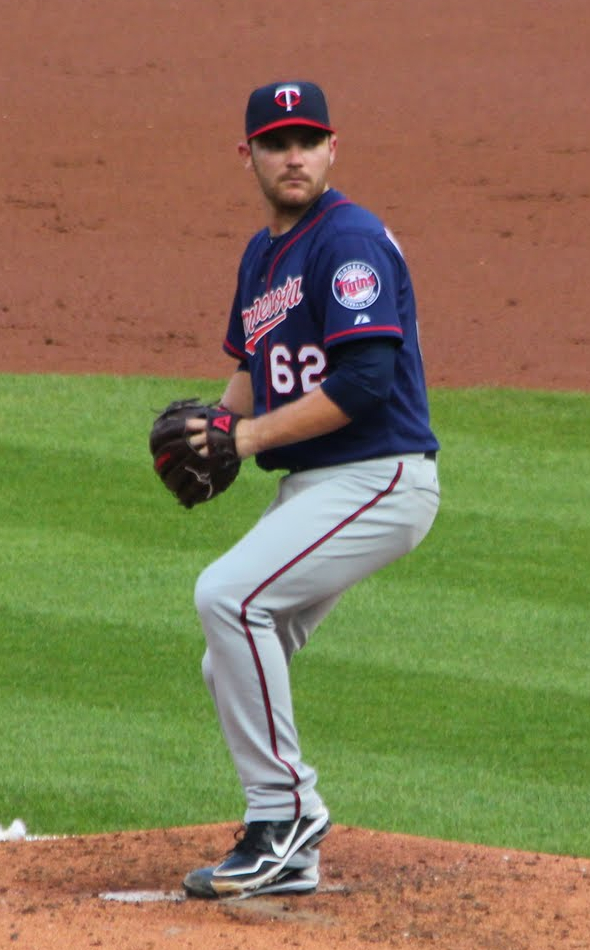
Hendriks with the Twins in 2012.

After a successful spring training (3–1, 2.84 ERA, 8 games/4 starts), Hendriks was named as one of the Twins' starting pitchers for 2012. On 19 September 2012, Hendriks earned his first Major League victory in a 6–4 win against the Cleveland Indians. On 5 December 2013, the Twins designated Hendriks for assignment, after the signing of pitcher Phil Hughes.

=== Toronto Blue Jays ===
On 13 December 2013, Hendriks was claimed off waivers by the Chicago Cubs. Ten days later, he was claimed off waivers again, this time by the Baltimore Orioles. The Orioles designated him for assignment on 19 February 2014 to make room for Ubaldo Jiménez on the active roster. The Toronto Blue Jays claimed Hendriks off waivers on 21 February 2014. On 10 March 2014, he was optioned to the Triple-A Buffalo Bisons. Hendriks compiled a 5–0 record with an ERA of 1.46 through nine games (seven starts) with the Bisons, before being called up to the Majors on 23 May 2014. He made his Blue Jays debut that day, picking up a 3–2 win over the Oakland Athletics. Hendriks started the game and allowed 3 hits, 1 earned run, 3 walks, striking out 3 over 5 2/3 innings. After 2 starts for the Blue Jays, in which he posted a 1–0 record with a 2.31 ERA and 8 strikeouts, he was optioned back to Buffalo on 1 June 2014. Hendriks was called up on 20 June to start against the Cincinnati Reds, and was sent back down to Buffalo the following day after he pitched only 1 2/3 innings and surrendered 6 earned runs. Hendriks was named as the starter for the International League in the Triple-A All-Star Game after posting a 7–1 record with a 2.19 ERA in 16 starts. He became only the fourth pitcher from the Bisons to start the All-Star Game. Hendriks was named the Top Star of the game.

=== Kansas City Royals ===
On 28 July 2014, Hendriks, along with Erik Kratz, was traded to the Kansas City Royals in exchange for Danny Valencia. He was recalled from the Omaha Storm Chasers on 27 August to make a start for the Royals against his former team, the Twins. He was designated for assignment on 24 October when Moises Sierra was claimed on waivers.

=== Toronto Blue Jays (second stint) ===
On 30 October 2014, Hendriks was traded back to the Toronto Blue Jays in exchange for Santiago Nessy. Hendriks pitched exclusively out of the bullpen in 2015, and appeared in a career-high 58 games. He would pitch to a 5–0 record, 2.92 ERA, and 71 strikeouts in 64 2/3 innings. In the playoffs, Hendriks broke an 85-year-old record in Game Four of the 2015 American League Championship Series on 20 October 2015. After starter R. A. Dickey gave up five runs, Hendriks entered the game as the long reliever and pitched 4 1/3 scoreless innings from the second to the sixth, finishing with thirteen outs from twelve batters faced, breaking the playoff record for more-outs-than-batters-faced performances; Jim Lindsey of the St. Louis Cardinals previously held the mark with eight outs from seven batters faced in 1930. In what was a criticized move, Hendriks was pulled in the seventh inning and relievers LaTroy Hawkins and Ryan Tepera subsequently surrendered seven runs; with the bullpen depleted, position player Cliff Pennington pitched the final outs as the Blue Jays lost 14-2. For his record-breaking performance in the ALCS, Hendriks was named the Male Player of the Year by Baseball Australia, and a finalist for the Western Australian Sports Star of the Year.

=== Oakland Athletics ===
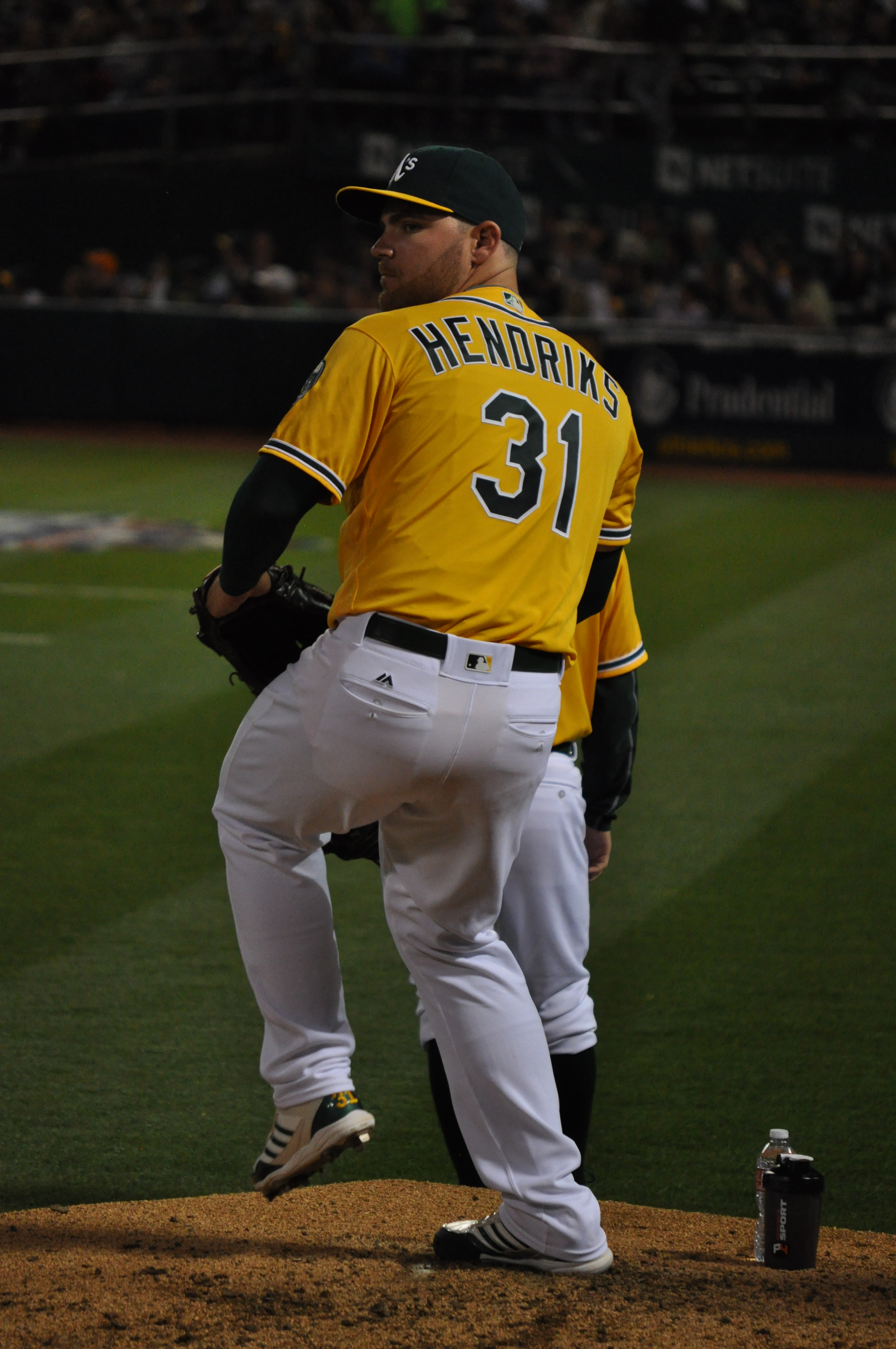
Hendriks in 2016

On 20 November 2015, the Blue Jays traded Hendriks to the Oakland Athletics for Jesse Chavez. Hendriks finished the 2016 season with a 3.76 ERA and 0–4 record, pitching 64 2/3 innings in 53 appearances. In 2017, he pitched 64 innings in 70 appearances with a 4–2 record and 4.22 ERA.

Hendriks was designated for assignment on 25 June 2018, and sent outright to Triple-A Nashville. He was called up to the major league club on 1 September 2018. During the regular season, Hendriks appeared in 25 games with Oakland, pitching 24 innings with a 0–1 record and 4.13 ERA. The Athletics used Hendriks as their opener in the 2018 American League Wild Card Game, becoming the first Australian born player ever to start an MLB postseason game.

In 2019, Hendriks took over as the Athletics' closer after an injury to Blake Treinen and made his first career All-Star Game, as a replacement for Charlie Morton. He also earned the inaugural All-MLB Second team honors. Hendriks enjoyed the best season of his career, finishing with a record of 4-4 with an ERA of 1.80 in 75 games, including 2 starts. He also recorded 25 saves while striking out 124 batters in 85 innings. In 2020, Hendriks continued his dominance from 2019, finishing with a 3-1 record with an ERA of 1.78 in 24 games. He recorded 14 saves and 37 strikeouts in 25 1/3 innings. In the postseason, Hendriks was 1-0 with a 3.18 ERA against the Chicago White Sox in the 2020 ALWCS & Houston Astros in the 2020 ALDS.

=== Chicago White Sox ===
On 11 January 2021, Hendriks signed a three year, $54 million deal with the Chicago White Sox, with a club option for a fourth year. Hendriks was named the AL Reliever of the Month for May and September; he previously received the award twice while with Oakland.

Hendriks earned the save in the 2021 All-Star Game at Coors Field in Denver, won 5-2 by the American League. Entering the game in the bottom of the ninth inning, Hendriks gave up two hits and struck out one, allowing no runs, all while he was being mic'd up by Fox, who were broadcasting the game.

On 12 August 2021, Hendriks was the first winning pitcher in Iowa during the Field of Dreams game despite blowing a save opportunity when the White Sox were up 7-4 in the top of the ninth. With two outs, Hendriks allowed four runs by giving up a pair of two-run home runs to New York Yankees batters Aaron Judge and Giancarlo Stanton to give the Yankees an 8-7 lead. Fortunately for Hendriks, he was still able to get the win due to Tim Anderson hitting a two-run, walk-off home run to give the White Sox a 9-8 win. Overall in 2021, Hendriks appeared in 69 games while recording an American League-leading 38 saves and having a record of 8-3. He also had an ERA of 2.54 in 71 innings and led all MLB relievers in strikeouts with 113. Hendriks won the Mariano Rivera AL Reliever of the Year Award for the second year in a row, becoming the second White Sox pitcher in history to win Reliever of the Year, joining Bobby Thigpen.

In 2022, Hendriks struggled to start the season. In the first game of the season against the Tigers with the White Sox up 4–3, Hendriks allowed a game-tying homerun to Eric Haase with one out in the bottom of the ninth, giving him a blown save. Hendriks then gave up a walk-off RBI single with two outs to Javier Baez, thus incurring the loss. Hendriks had an ERA of 5.40 in the month of April, but was able to turn it around as the season went on. But on 14 June, Hendriks would be placed on the IL with a right forearm strain. Hendriks came back on the Fourth of July and pitched his first game since 10 June on the same day against the Minnesota Twins, where he pitched in the eighth inning and struck out the side in 14 pitches. Hendriks made his third All-Star game appearance that season. He pitched a third of the eighth inning, inducing Atlanta Braves catcher Travis d'Arnaud to pop out to Seattle Mariners rookie center fielder Julio Rodríguez. Hendriks was also mic'd up by Fox, who were broadcasting the game, and was yelling at Rodríguez to throw the ball back to him, even with Rodríguez pretending to throw the ball to a fan in the stands before throwing the ball back to Hendriks. Overall, Hendriks had a 4–4 record in 58 games with an ERA of 2.81 in 57.2 innings while striking out 85 batters and made 37 saves.

Hendriks started the 2023 season on the Injured List while recovering from cancer treatment. He made his 2023 debut on 29 May 2023, in the eighth inning against the Angels and proceeded to give up two runs. Hendriks managed to make five game appearances before being added to the Injured List for elbow inflammation on 11 June. During that five game stint he compiled a 5.40 ERA, two wins, and one save. On 2 August, it was announced that Hendriks had undergone Tommy John surgery and would miss the remainder of the season. He became a free agent after the season, when the White Sox declined their club option.

In July 2023 Hendriks was honored with the Jimmy V Award for Perseverance at ESPYS. His speech closed with the iconic words from the late Jimmy Valvano, "Don’t give up. Don’t ever give up," Hendriks said. "And I won’t."

=== Boston Red Sox ===
Prior to the 2024 season, Hendriks set a deadline of 15 February to sign with a team, otherwise he would remain a free agent and wait to sign until he was closer to recovering from surgery. This deadline ultimately came and went without Hendriks signing with a team. On 20 February 2024, the Boston Red Sox, announced that they had signed Hendriks to a two-year, $10 million contract. He began the season on the 60-day injured list with the Red Sox. Hendriks began appearing in minor league games as part of his rehab in August. In September, Hendriks was named as the Red Sox' nominee for MLB's annual Roberto Clemente Award.

On 19 April 2025, the Red Sox activated Hendriks from the injured list, allowing him to make his return from injury. In 14 appearances for Boston upon returning, he struggled to an 0–2 record and 6.59 ERA with 12 strikeouts across 13 2/3 innings pitched. On 30 May, Hendriks was placed on the injured list due to right hip inflammation; he was transferred to the 60-day injured list on 8 July. On 29 September, Hendriks underwent ulnar nerve transposition surgery on his right elbow.

On 4 November 2025, the Red Sox declined Hendriks' 2026 option, making him a free agent.

=== Chicago Cubs ===
On 11 February 2026, Hendriks returned to the Minnesota Twins on a minor league contract. The Twins released Hendriks on 20 March, after he failed to make the team's opening day roster.

On 13 May 2026, Hendriks signed a minor league contract with the Chicago Cubs organization. He made five scoreless appearances split between the rookie–level Arizona Complex League Cubs and Triple–A Iowa Cubs, recording seven strikeouts over five innings of work. Hendriks was released by Chicago on 16 July.

Following the end of the 2026 season, Hendriks announced his retirement from baseball.

== International career ==
=== World Baseball Classic ===
Hendriks underwent back surgery that prevented him from playing in the minors in the 2008 season, but made the 2009 World Baseball Classic roster, the youngest Australian player in the Classic.

On 9 February 2017, he was selected for the 2017 World Baseball Classic, but opted not to participate in the first round, where Australia were eventually knocked out.

== Personal life ==
Hendriks married his wife Kristi in 2013. Through his wife, Hendriks became a Montreal Canadiens fan, saying in an interview with NHL Network in 2020 that he's "watched every game" and has "embraced the Habs lifestyle". He also supports North Melbourne Football Club.

On 8 January 2023, Hendriks announced that he had been diagnosed with stage 4 non-Hodgkin lymphoma and was beginning treatment. On 5 April 2023, Hendriks announced on Instagram that he had finished chemotherapy. On 20 April, he announced that he was cancer-free.

== See also ==
- List of Major League Baseball players from Australia
