= Craig Shipley =

Australian baseball player (born 1963)

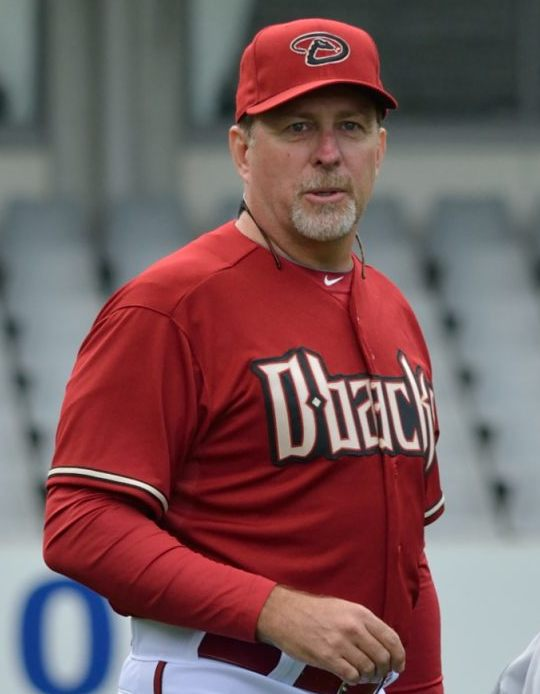
- Shipley with the Diamondbacks in 2013

Arizona Diamondbacks
- Third Baseman / Assistant General Manager
- Born: 7 January 1963 (age 63); Parramatta, New South Wales, Australia
- Batted: Right Threw: Right

MLB debut
- 22 June, 1986, for the Los Angeles Dodgers

Last MLB appearance
- 25 September, 1998, for the Anaheim Angels

MLB statistics
- Batting average: .271
- Home runs: 20
- Runs batted in: 138
- Stats at Baseball Reference

Teams
- Los Angeles Dodgers (1986–1987); New York Mets (1989); San Diego Padres (1991–1994); Houston Astros (1995); San Diego Padres (1996–1997); Anaheim Angels (1998)

Member of the Australian

Baseball Hall of Fame
- Induction: 2005

Craig Barry Shipley (born 7 January 1963) is an Australian executive and former player in Major League Baseball. On 16 November 2012, he was appointed special assistant to Arizona Diamondbacks general manager Kevin Towers.

As a player, he was an infielder for the Los Angeles Dodgers (1986–87), New York Mets (1989), San Diego Padres (1991–94 and 1996–97), Houston Astros (1995) and Anaheim Angels (1998). He played collegiately at the University of Alabama. Shipley batted and threw right-handed; he stood 6 feet 1 inch (1.85 m) tall, and weighed 175 pounds (79 kg) (12 stone 7).

Shipley is the first Australian-born player to play Major League Baseball in the modern era.

== Playing career ==
Shipley was born and raised in Australia, attended Epping Boys High School in New South Wales and learned to play baseball from his father, Barry. He played college baseball at Alabama as a shortstop. Shipley homered in his first collegiate at-bat and, as of 2026, held Alabama's single-game record for runs scored, with six in a 1984 game against Georgia Southern.

Shipley began switch-hitting in college at the suggestion of his coaches. Before the start of the 1986 season, after struggling offensively for two seasons in the minors, he reverted to batting exclusively from the right side of the plate.

He helped the Padres win the 1996 National League Western Division championship, appearing in 33 games played – 21 after 31 July – and batting .315 with 29 hits, five doubles, one home run, seven runs batted in and seven stolen bases. In the field, he started at four different defensive positions: second base, third base, shortstop and right field. However, he did not appear in the postseason.

In 11 seasons, Shipley played in 582 games and had 1,345 at bats, 155 runs scored, 364 hits, 63 doubles, six triples, 20 home runs, 138 RBI, 33 stolen bases, 47 bases on balls, a .271 batting average, .302 on-base percentage, .371 slugging percentage, 499 total bases, 15 sacrifice hits, nine sacrifice flies and 7 intentional walks.

== Post-playing career ==
Shipley's post-playing career began in 2000, when he was a roving minor league baserunning and infield instructor for the Montreal Expos. He then returned to the Padres as a professional scout, working for Towers, in 2001–2002.

In 2003, Shipley followed former Padres executives Larry Lucchino and Theo Epstein to the Boston Red Sox, where he began as special assistant to the general manager, player development and international scouting. He was named a vice president in 2006, and was appointed senior vice president, international scouting, in 2009. In February 2011, Shipley was promoted again, when he was named senior vice president, player personnel and international scouting. However, weeks after Epstein departed the Red Sox for the Chicago Cubs in October 2011, Shipley was dismissed in an overhaul of the Boston front office under the team's new general manager, Ben Cherington.

In 2012, Shipley was hired by the Arizona Diamondbacks as an assistant to general manager Kevin Towers. As of 2022, he is still part of the Diamondbacks front office, assisting "the Baseball Operations Department in international and special assignment scouting, evaluating the D-backs' farm system and serving as an advisor to the GM."

== See also ==
- List of players from Australia in Major League Baseball
