= Graeme Lloyd =

Australian baseball player (born 1967)

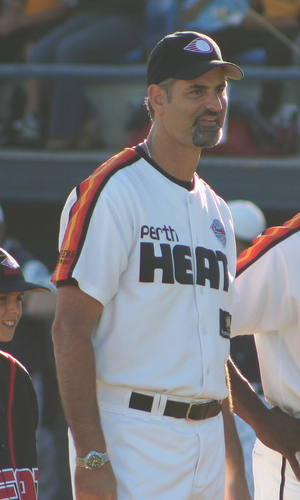
- Lloyd with the Perth Heat in 2009
- Pitcher
- Born: 9 April 1967 (age 59); Geelong, Victoria, Australia
- Batted: Left Threw: Left

MLB debut
- 11 April, 1993, for the Milwaukee Brewers

Last MLB appearance
- 27 September, 2003, for the Kansas City Royals

MLB statistics
- Win–loss record: 30–36
- Earned run average: 4.04
- Strikeouts: 304
- Stats at Baseball Reference

Teams
- Milwaukee Brewers (1993–1996); New York Yankees (1996–1998); Toronto Blue Jays (1999); Montreal Expos (2001–2002); Florida Marlins (2002); New York Mets (2003); Kansas City Royals (2003)

Career highlights and awards
- 2× World Series champion (1996, 1998)

Member of the Australian

Baseball Hall of Fame
- Induction: 2005
Medals
Men's baseball
Representing Australia
Olympic Games
Silver medal – second place	2004 Athens	Team

Graeme John Lloyd (born 9 April 1967) is an Australian former professional baseball pitcher. He played in Major League Baseball (MLB) for the Milwaukee Brewers, New York Yankees, Toronto Blue Jays, Montreal Expos, Florida Marlins, New York Mets, and Kansas City Royals.

== Playing career ==
Lloyd played with the Milwaukee Brewers, New York Yankees, Toronto Blue Jays, and Kansas City Royals of the American League and the Montreal Expos, Florida Marlins, and New York Mets of the National League. He was the third native Australian to have pitched in Major League Baseball. Lloyd was used exclusively as a relief pitcher during his ten years in the major leagues, ending his career with 30 wins against 36 losses, 17 saves, and 97 holds.

At his peak, Lloyd threw a sinking fastball that reached 90 miles (140 km) per hour and a slider. Later in his career, he added a palmball to his repertoire which he only threw on two occasions, striking out Mike Piazza and Sammy Sosa. For much of his career, he was used as a left-handed specialist. This type of pitcher is used against an opposing team's star left-handed hitter(s) late in a game.

In August 1996, the Brewers traded Lloyd and Pat Listach to the New York Yankees for Gerald Williams and Bob Wickman. Lloyd became the first Australian-born baseball player to win a World Series in 1996. Lloyd was awarded the win for Game 4 of the series, replacing Mariano Rivera in the ninth inning and inducing the left-handed batsman Fred McGriff to hit into an inning-ending double play. After the Yankees took the lead in the tenth, Lloyd returned to the mound and struck out Ryan Klesko before being replaced by closer John Wetteland.

Lloyd became a two-time World Series champion for the Yankees in 1998, defeating the San Diego Padres. He also recorded a 0.00 ERA in 13 career postseason appearances, and is still the only Australian-born baseball player to have won a World Series.

The Toronto Blue Jays demanded Lloyd be included in a package anchored by starting pitcher David Wells when the Yankees traded for Toronto starting pitcher Roger Clemens in February 1999.

Lloyd missed the entire 2000 season while recovering from arthroscopic surgery. In 2001, he received the Tony Conigliaro Award, a national recognition instituted in 1990 by the Boston Red Sox to honour the memory of the late Tony Conigliaro, given annually to a Major League Baseball (MLB) player who best "overcomes an obstacle and adversity through the attributes of spirit, determination, and courage that were trademarks of Conigliaro."

== International and coaching career ==
Lloyd represented his native Australia at the 2004 Summer Olympics in Athens. Lloyd has coached the Australia national baseball team at the senior, U23 and U18 levels as well as the Australia women's national baseball team.

Lloyd has served as a pitching coach in the Australian Baseball League with the Perth Heat and Melbourne Aces. He served as a manager in the same league for Geelong-Korea.

== Personal ==
Lloyd's wife Cindy suffered from Crohn's disease. She died in 2000 at the age of 26. In 2000 and 2001, Graeme acted as the spokesman for the Graeme Lloyd and Jon Mechanic Field of Dreams, a charity which was dedicated in the name of Cindy Lloyd.

== See also ==
- List of Olympic medalists in baseball
- List of players from Australia in Major League Baseball
