= Ross Straw =

Ross Straw was an Australian Olympic coach and former Olympic baseball competitor. He captained the Australian team at the 1956 Summer Olympics in Melbourne, where it was a demonstration sport. Australia lost the single match there against a selection from the USA. He was one of the first Australians to be offered a contract with a Major League Baseball team, the Boston Red Sox.

Straw was instrumental in getting Australia involved in Baseball Federation of Asia competitions.

He was a member of the Victorian Wartime team in 1942 and 1943, and played for and coached the Victorian state team from 1942 to 1969. Straw was first appointed national coaching director (appointed by what was then the Australian Baseball Council, now the Australian Baseball Federation) in 1975 and formed Australia's first national elite coaching committee.
