= Trent Durrington =

Australian baseball player (born 1975)

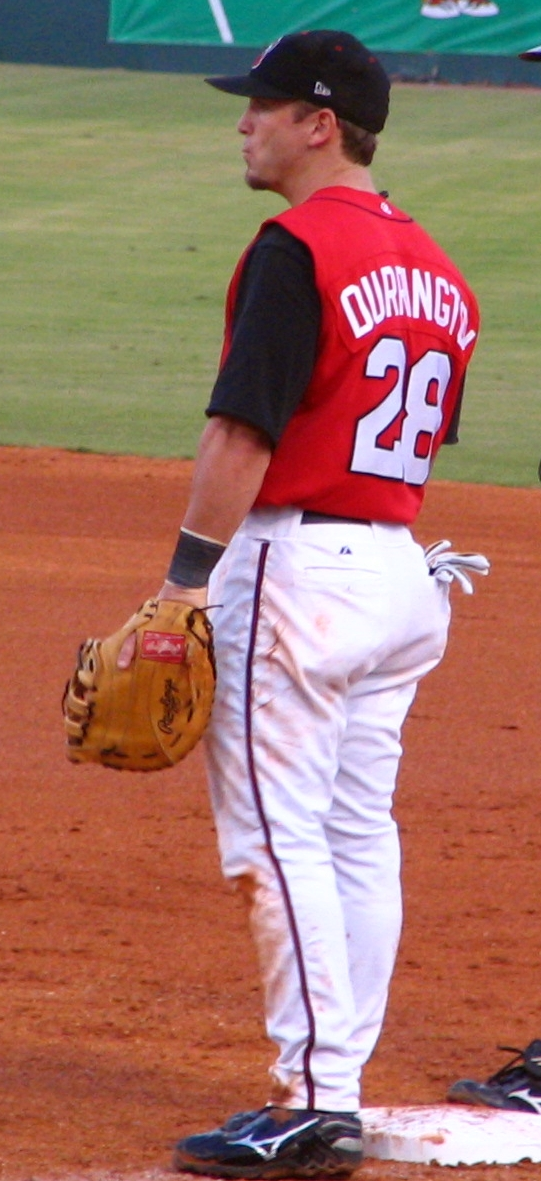
- Durrington with the Nashville Sounds in 2005
- Second baseman
- Born: 27 August 1975 (age 50); Sydney, Australia
- Batted: Right Threw: Right

MLB debut
- 6 August, 1999, for the Anaheim Angels

Last MLB appearance
- 28 September, 2005, for the Milwaukee Brewers

MLB statistics
- Batting average: .196
- Home runs: 2
- Runs batted in: 9
- Stats at Baseball Reference

Teams
- Anaheim Angels (1999–2000, 2003); Milwaukee Brewers (2004–2005)

Member of the Australian

Baseball Hall of Fame
- Induction: 2015

Trent John Durrington (born 27 August 1975) is an Australian former professional baseball player. He is primarily a second baseman. In his years as a student, he attended The Southport School located in Gold Coast.

== Career ==
After making his major league debut on 6 August 1999, with the Anaheim Angels, Durrington would also see action with Anaheim in the 2000 and 2003 seasons. Durrington signed with the Milwaukee Brewers as a free agent after the 2003 season expired, where he saw action in the 2004 and 2005 seasons. In what would turn out to be his penultimate game in the major leagues on 26 September 2005, Durrington achieved a very unusual feat: he entered the game as a pinch-runner and later struck out to end the same inning. He made his big league pitching debut in a 14–5 loss 17 April 2004 at Houston, retiring the only man he faced, Jose Vizcaino, on a first-pitch fly ball to right field. Durrington is the only Australian position player to have pitched in the Majors. As of August 2022, he is the only player to throw just one pitch in the Major Leagues since STATS, LLC began tracking pitch count data in 1988.

In March 2006, Durrington played with the Australian national team in the World Baseball Classic. He then spent the regular season playing with Boston's Triple-A affiliate, the Pawtucket Red Sox. Durrington played for the Buffalo Bisons, the Triple-A affiliate of the Cleveland Indians, in 2007. He made four career pitching appearances in the minors as well, and holds a career record of 1–1. He was released and retired at the end of the 2007 season.

Durrington's only minor league pitching win came on 5 May 2007 at Dunn Tire Park against the Pawtucket Red Sox. The win came in a game that was suspended on 23 April, but resumed nearly two weeks later. Durrington entered in the top of the 9th with the bases loaded and the Bisons losing 12–6. He walked the first two batters before retiring Luis Antonio Jimenez. The Bisons then managed to send thirteen men to the plate in the bottom of the ninth and got Durrington his only professional win with a bases-loaded walk.

In 2015, he was inducted into the Australian Baseball Hall of Fame, in the category "Special induction for players who have had outstanding careers in the game of baseball Internationally, (e.g. MLB, Asia and other areas), and made outstanding contributions to the game of Baseball who may not meet the standard criteria."

== Personal life ==
His son, Max Durrington, is also a professional baseball player.
