= Mark Hutton =

Australian baseball player (born 1970)

- Pitcher
- Born: 6 February 1970 (age 56); Belair, South Australia
- Batted: Right Threw: Right

MLB debut
- 23 July 1993, for the New York Yankees

Last MLB appearance
- 21 May 1998, for the Cincinnati Reds

MLB statistics
- Win–loss record: 9–7
- Earned run average: 4.75
- Strikeouts: 111
- Stats at Baseball Reference

Teams
- New York Yankees (1993–1994, 1996); Florida Marlins (1996–1997); Colorado Rockies (1997); Cincinnati Reds (1998)

Mark Steven Hutton (born 6 February 1970) is an Australian former professional baseball right-handed pitcher. He played for the New York Yankees, Florida Marlins, Colorado Rockies, and Cincinnati Reds of Major League Baseball (MLB) from 1993 to 1998. He also represented the Australia national baseball team at the 2000 Summer Olympics. Hutton was the first Australian starting pitcher in MLB.

== Early life ==
Hutton is from Belair, South Australia. His father, David, played baseball as a pitcher. Hutton began to play youth baseball for the Sturt Baseball Club in the South Australian Baseball League when he was nine years old. He also played cricket as a bowler. Hutton graduated from Scotch College in Adelaide.

== Professional career ==
Hutton signed a professional contract with the New York Yankees of Major League Baseball (MLB) in December 1988 for a signing bonus of $15,000. He reported to spring training with the Yankees in 1989. After struggling in his first seasons in Minor League Baseball, Hutton emerged as one of the Yankees' best prospects in 1991 when he pitched for the Fort Lauderdale Yankees of the High-A Florida State League and had a 2.45 earned run average (ERA) with 117 strikeouts in 147 innings pitched. He continued to pitch well for the Albany-Colonie Yankees of the Double-A Eastern League in 1992.

Hutton made his major league debut as a starting pitcher on 23 July 1993 for the New York Yankees, becoming the first Australian to be a starting pitcher in an MLB game. At his peak, he could throw his fastball at 95–96 miles per hour (153–154 km/h). Hutton continued to be optioned between the Yankees and the Columbus Clippers of the Triple A International League over the 1993 through 1996 seasons. Hutton had a 0–2 win–loss record and a 5.04 ERA for the Yankees in the beginning of the 1996 season.

On 31 July 1996, right before the MLB trade deadline, the Yankees traded Hutton to the Florida Marlins for David Weathers. He had a is 1–3 with a 5.08 ERA in 21 games, including 11 games started, with the Yankees. He received a World Series ring after the Yankees won the 1996 World Series. During spring training in 1997, Hutton competed with Tony Saunders and Rick Helling for a spot in the Marlins rotation, which went to Saunders. On 27 July 1997, the Marlins traded him to Colorado Rockies for Craig Counsell. Hutton struggled due to a sore arm and decreased velocity on his fastball and was used infrequently by manager Don Baylor. The Rockies traded Hutton to the Cincinnati Reds for Curtis Goodwin on 10 December 1997.

Hutton competed for a spot in the Reds starting rotation for the 1998 season. He pitched for the Reds until he suffered a groin injury. He rehabilitated with the Indianapolis Indians of the International League and the Reds outrighted Hutton to Indianapolis when he completed the rehab assignment. After the season, Hutton was granted free agency. He signed a minor league contract with the Tampa Bay Devil Rays for the 1999 season, but was released by the Devil Rays before the start of the season. He signed with the Newark Bears of the Atlantic League of Professional Baseball, an independent baseball league, but was released in May, before the season started. In 2000, he signed with the Houston Astros organization on a minor league contract. He played for the Round Rock Express of the Double A Texas League and New Orleans Zephyrs of the Triple-A Pacific Coast League.

Hutton was a member of the Australian national baseball team at the 2000 Summer Olympics. The Australian team finished in seventh place out of eight nations. Hutton started the final game of the tournament, taking the loss against the United States.

== Later life ==
Hutton retired to Lower Mitcham. He and his wife, Tracey, have two sons, Jack and Harry Hutton.

Hutton dabbled in coaching youth baseball players and supported a funding campaign to save the Sturt Baseball Club. He became a coach for the Sturt Baseball Club in 2009. He became a fill-in pitching coach for the Adelaide Bite of the Australian Baseball League in 2013.

== See also ==
- List of Major League Baseball players from Australia
