= Philip Dale =

Australian baseball player (born 1962)

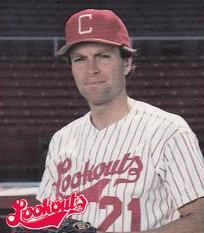
- Dale in 1988

Melbourne Aces
- Pitcher / Coach
- Born: 8 August 1962 (age 64); Melbourne, Australia
- Bats: Right Throws: Right
- Stats at Baseball Reference

Member of the Australian

Baseball Hall of Fame
- Induction: 2005

Philip Dale (born 8 August 1962), is an Australian former professional baseball pitcher who currently serves as a coach with the Australia national baseball team.

Dale had a baseball career and was the first Australian to receive a 4-year baseball scholarship to an American university, being Georgia Southern University. He also was a pitcher for the Australian national team, spending four seasons in the minor leagues. Dale later played in the Australian Baseball League, setting several records. After his playing career, he went into scouting and coaching, including being the pitching coach for a silver medal Athens 2004 Olympics Australian Olympic baseball team.

== Background ==
Dale pitched for Australia in the 1982 Amateur World Series (Baseball World Cup). After which, he traveled to the US and pitched for Georgia Southern University, the first Australian baseball player to win a 4-year scholarship to a USA college. He was undrafted but signed a contract with the Cincinnati Reds and debuted in 1985 for the GCL Reds, going a very impressive 2–2 with 7 saves and a 0.89 ERA in 15 games for the team. He tied John Tanner for the Gulf Coast League lead in saves and made the GCL All-Star team that year. He was then promoted to the Tampa Tarpons and was 2–1 with a 2.20 ERA.

Phil was with Tampa for all of 1986, going a reasonable 5–4 with 3 saves and a 2.80 ERA. In '87, Dale was 4–4 with 12 saves for the Cedar Rapids Reds, posting a 2.95 ERA. He was released at the end of the 1988 season, when he had a 4–10 and a 4.30 ERA. Dale then moved on to work as a minor league coach in the Reds and Atlanta Braves chain following the end of his playing career in the USA.

== Australian Baseball League ==
When the Australian Baseball League was founded in 1989–1990, Dale was manager of the Waverley Reds. He not only managed them to the pennant, but he also pitched, recording 9–2 with a 1.44 ERA, leading the league in ERA, wins and was third in strikeouts, just missing a pitching Triple Crown. He picked up an even rarer Triple Crown, though, winning honours as Pitcher of the Year, Most Valuable Player on top of Manager of the Year.

Dale fell to 7–3, 3.18 in the 1990–1991 Australian Baseball League. Phil went an identical 7–3 with a 2.12 ERA in 1991–1992, being was second to Adrian Meagher in ERA and tied him for wins. In 1992–1993, Dale posted a 3–5, 7 Sv, 2.47 after being moved to the bullpen. He won Manager of the Year honours and was the All-Star relief pitcher.

Dale went 4–5 with five saves and a 2.72 ERA in 1993–1994, and in the 1994–1995 ABL, he returned to rotation, but giving up managing to concentrate on playing, which worked, going 12–2 with 2 saves and ended up winning Pitcher of the Year honours for the second time, then picked up the championship round MVP award as the Reds won their second pennant. He tossed a 4-hitter against the Perth Heat to win the championship.

The Melbourne native fell to 4–5 with 3 saves, a 4.46 ERA in 1995–1996, but then moved to the Melbourne Monarchs for the next season. In the 1996–1997 ABL, Dale posted a 9–7, 3.70 record, tying for the most wins in the league. He went 1–0 with a 2.13 ERA in the 1997 Intercontinental Cup for the Australia national baseball team, leading the side in ERA.

In the 1997–1998 Australian Baseball League, the now ageing Dale was 8–3 with a 4.03 ERA; in 109 1/3 innings, he struck out 95 and walked 19. He led the ABL in complete games (9), wins, innings pitched and strikeouts. Back on the international scene, Dale pitched for Australia in the 1998 Baseball World Cup, going 1–1 with a 4.76 ERA. During the 1998–1999 ABL campaign he was less impressive, going 2–4 and a 4.56 ERA for the Monarchs to conclude his professional playing career.

Dale was 65–39 with 18 saves and a 3.19 ERA in a decade in the Australian Baseball League. He completed 58 of 102 starts. Dale was 5th all-time in the ABL in ERA, .10 ahead of big leaguer Pat Ahearne and .28 ahead of another big leaguer, Shayne Bennett. He was also first in wins (but also losses), innings pitched.

== Post-ABL ==
For the next ten years Dale found himself as a coach for the Australian national team. He held that position in the 2000 Olympics, 2001 Baseball World Cup, 2004 Olympics (silver medalists), 2005 Baseball World Cup, 2006 World Baseball Classic, 2006 Intercontinental Cup, 2007 Baseball World Cup, 2008 Final Olympic Qualification Tournament and 2009 World Baseball Classic. Dale is also a scout for the Atlanta Braves, covering South Korea and Taiwan in addition to Australia.

Dale was announced as the Melbourne Aces head coach in the new Australian Baseball League

I am honoured to lead Melbourne into the inaugural season of the new ABL, I look forward to helping develop the baseball stars of tomorrow, today, on our home soil, and provide our fans with a highly competitive baseball team.

== Personal life ==
Dale's nephew, Jon Kennedy, is also a professional baseball player. His son, Jarryd, plays for the Kia Tigers of the KBO League.
